= List of Detroit Red Wings award winners =

Detroit Red Wings awards
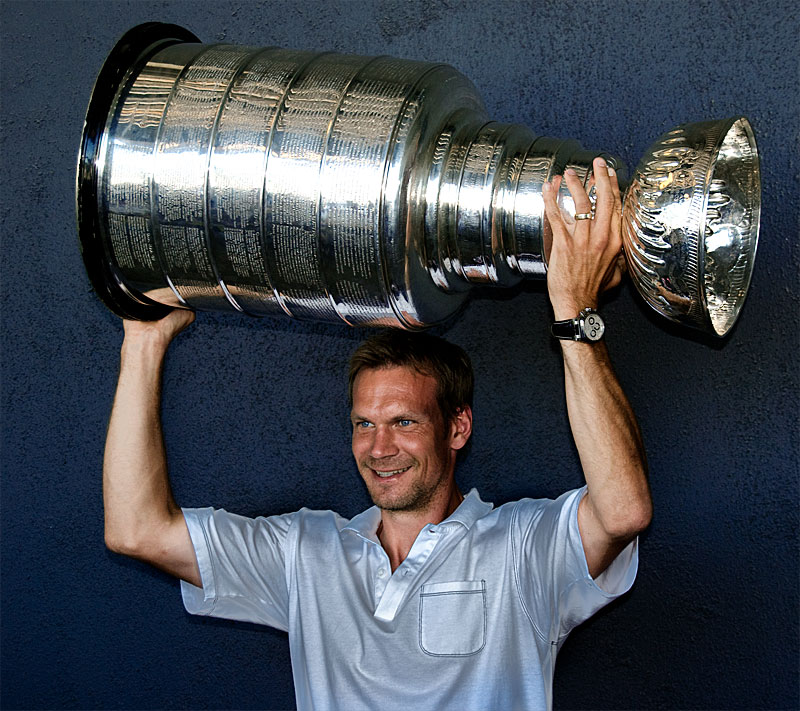
- The Red Wings have won the Stanley Cup 11 times. Nicklas Lidstrom is seen here with the trophy after winning it in 2008.

Team trophies
- Award*: Wins
- Stanley Cup: 11
- Clarence S. Campbell Bowl: 6
- Prince of Wales Trophy: 13
- Presidents' Trophy: 6
- O'Brien Trophy: 5

Individual awards
- Award*: Wins
- Art Ross Trophy: 7
- Bill Masterton Memorial Trophy: 2
- Calder Memorial Trophy: 6
- Charlie Conacher Memorial Trophy: 2
- Conn Smythe Trophy: 5
- Frank J. Selke Trophy: 7
- Hart Memorial Trophy: 9
- Jack Adams Award: 4
- James Norris Memorial Trophy: 9
- King Clancy Memorial Trophy: 2
- Lady Byng Memorial Trophy: 14
- Lester Patrick Trophy: 25
- Mark Messier Leadership Award: 1
- NHL Foundation Player Award: 2
- NHL Lifetime Achievement Award: 1
- NHL Plus-Minus Award: 4
- Ted Lindsay Award: 2
- Vezina Trophy: 5
- William M. Jennings Trophy: 2
- Foster Hewitt Memorial Award: 3
- Golden Hockey Stick: 1
- Kharlamov Trophy: 3
- Viking Award: 5

Total
- Awards won: 162

The Detroit Red Wings are a professional ice hockey team based in Detroit, Michigan. They are members of the Atlantic Division in the Eastern Conference of the National Hockey League (NHL) and are one of the "Original Six" teams of the league. The franchise and its members have won numerous team and individual awards and honors. The first team trophy acquired by the club was the Prince of Wales Trophy in 1934, at the time awarded to the champion of the American Division. Their most recent team trophy was the Clarence S. Campbell Bowl in 2009, taken in honor of being the champions of the Western Conference.^{[a]} The team has captured the Stanley Cup as league champion eleven times, most recently in 2008.

Gordie Howe is the team's most decorated player, with six wins each of the Art Ross Trophy as regular season scoring leader and the Hart Memorial Trophy as regular season most valuable player (MVP), twenty-one selections to the First and Second Team All-Stars (the most in league history), twenty-two appearances in the All-Star Game, the Lester Patrick Trophy for outstanding contributions to the sport in the United States, and the NHL Lifetime Achievement Award for long term contributions to hockey. Nicklas Lidstrom has the most awards of any defenseman, having once won the Conn Smythe Trophy as post season MVP to go along with having won the James Norris Memorial Trophy (Norris Trophy) seven times as the best defenseman in the league as well as twelve selections to the First and Second Team All-Stars and twelve selections to the All-Star Game. Terry Sawchuk leads goaltenders with three wins of the Vezina Trophy as the league's best goaltender, seven selections to the First and Second Team All-Stars, seven selections to the All-Star Game, the Lester Patrick Trophy, and the Calder Memorial Trophy as the league's best rookie. Howe, Lidstrom, and Sawchuk have all had their uniform number retired by the team and have all been inducted into the Hockey Hall of Fame.

Three Red Wings have been the inaugural recipient of an award and three awards are named in honor of former Red Wings. In 1932 Carl Voss was named the first winner of the Calder Memorial Trophy. The first time the Norris Trophy was awarded was in 1954, when Red Kelly won. In 2007 Chris Chelios was named the first annual winner of the Mark Messier Leadership Award, the award previously having been given on a monthly basis. The Jack Adams Award, given to the best coach, is named for Jack Adams, long-time head coach and general manager of the club. The Norris Trophy takes its name from James E. Norris, who owned the club from 1932 to 1952. In 2010, the Lester B. Pearson Award was renamed the Ted Lindsay Award to recognize Ted Lindsay "for his skill, tenacity, leadership, and for his role in establishing the original Players' Association."

== League awards ==
=== Team trophies ===
The Detroit Red Wings have won the O'Brien Trophy five times, the Clarence S. Campbell Bowl and the Presidents' Trophy six times each, the Stanley Cup eleven times, and the Prince of Wales Trophy thirteen times.

Team trophies awarded to the Detroit Red Wings
Award	Description	Times won	Seasons	References
Stanley Cup	NHL championship	11	1935–36, 1936–37, 1942–43, 1949–50, 1951–52, 1953–54, 1954–55, 1996–97, 1997–98, 2001–02, 2007–08	
O'Brien Trophy	NHL championship runner-up	5	1940–41, 1941–42, 1944–45, 1947–48, 1948–49	
Clarence S. Campbell Bowl	Western Conference playoff championship	6	1994–95, 1996–97, 1997–98, 2001–02, 2007–08, 2008–09	
Prince of Wales Trophy	American Division championship, most regular season points^{[b]}	13	1933–34, 1935–36, 1936–37, 1942–43, 1948–49, 1949–50, 1950–51, 1951–52, 1952–53, 1953–54, 1954–55, 1956–57, 1964–65	
Presidents' Trophy	Most regular season points	6	1994–95, 1995–96, 2001–02, 2003–04, 2005–06, 2007–08	

=== Individual awards ===
Many members of the Red Wings organization have received individual awards from the league. The Lady Byng Memorial Trophy has been won fourteen times by seven different players in recognition of their gentlemanly play; Pavel Datsyuk has won four times while Red Kelly and Alex Delvecchio have each won three times. The Hart Memorial Trophy, for most valuable player, and the James Norris Memorial Trophy, awarded to the league's best defenseman, have each been won nine times. Gordie Howe won the Hart six times and Nicklas Lidstrom won the Norris seven times. Three coaches have been honored with the Jack Adams Award a total of four times; Jacques Demers is the only person to have won the award in consecutive years as well as being the only coach to win twice with the same team.

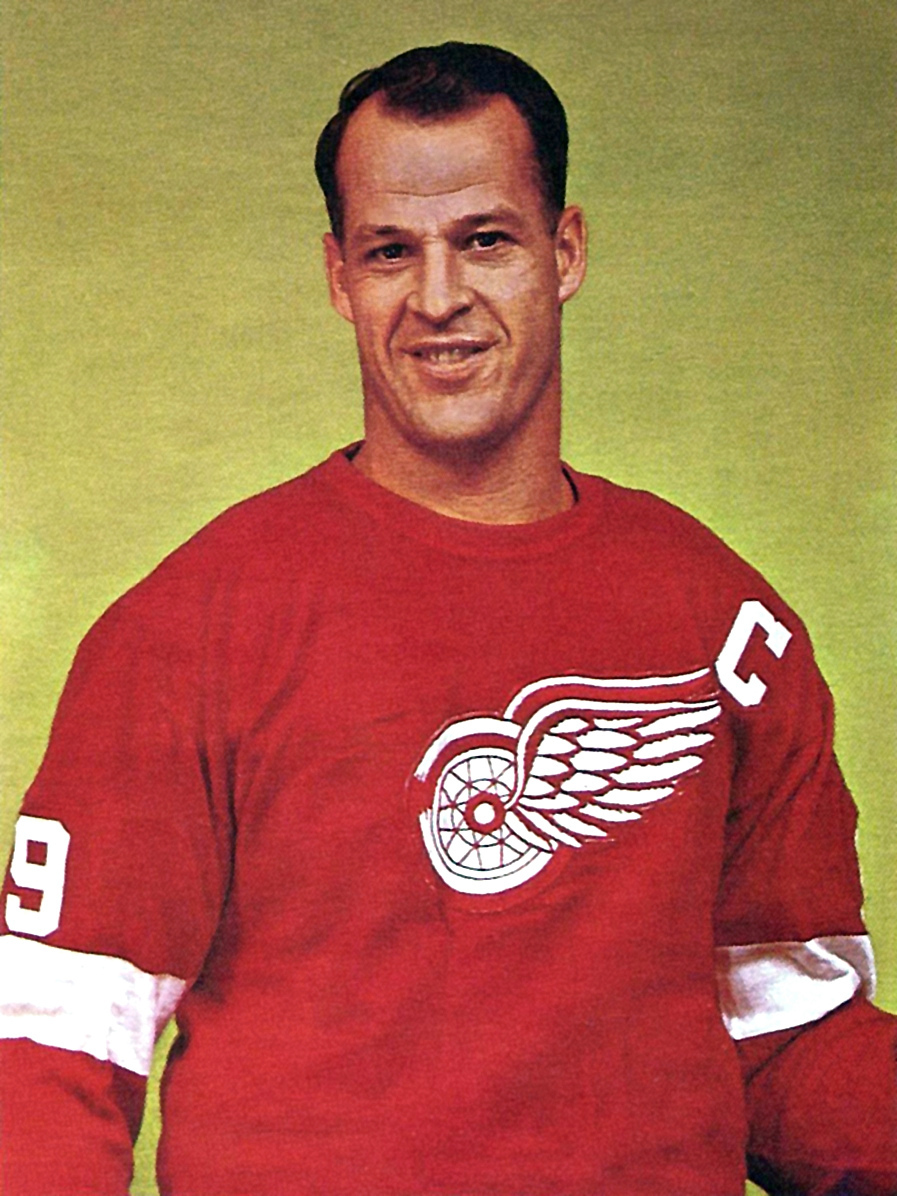
Gordie Howe won more awards than any other player in team history

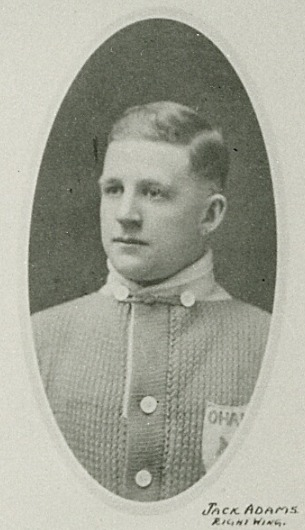
The Jack Adams Award is named in honor of Jack Adams

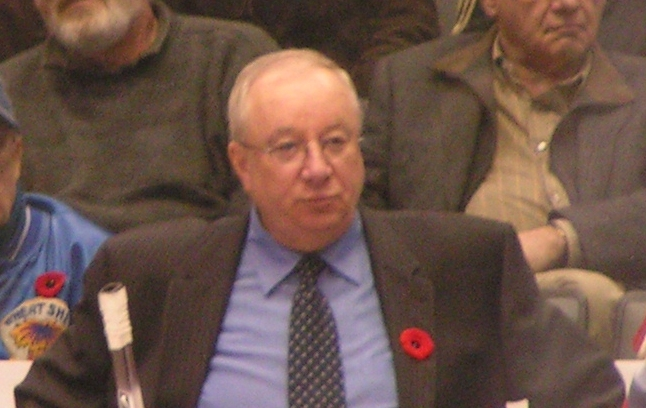
Jacques Demers won the Jack Adams Award in consecutive years

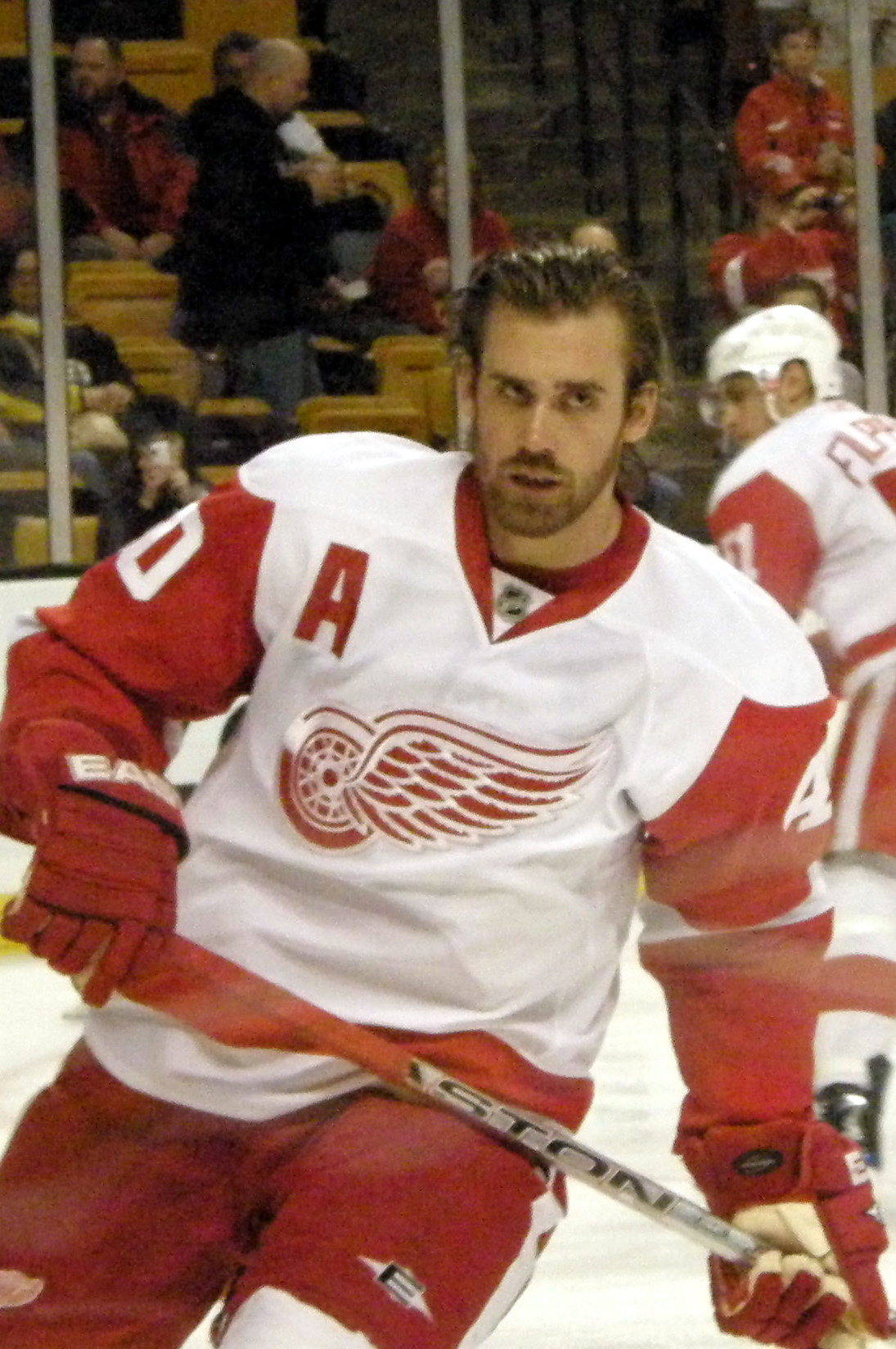
Henrik Zetterberg won the Conn Smythe Trophy in 2008 and the NHL Foundation Player Award in 2013

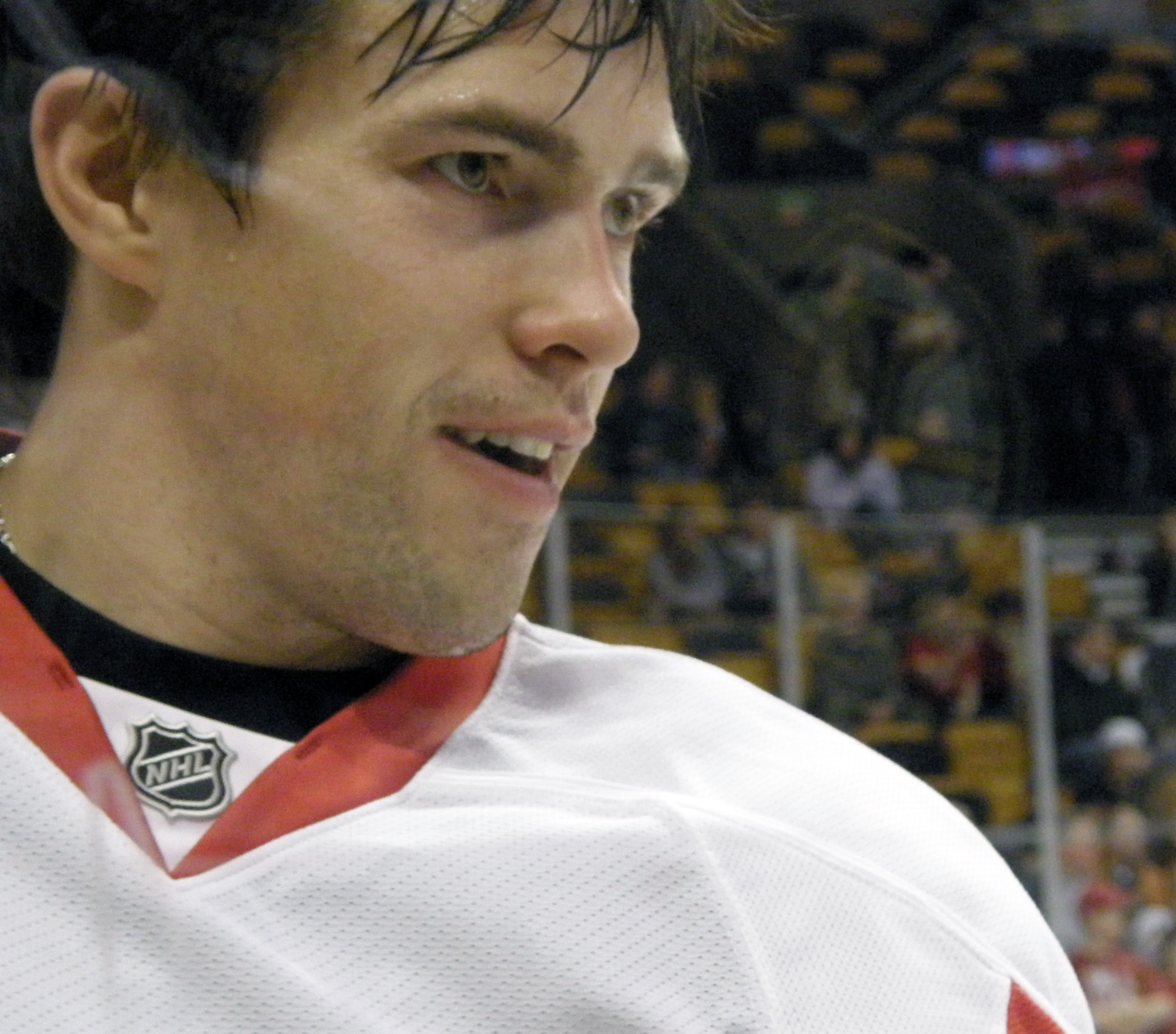
Pavel Datsyuk has won both the Frank J. Selke Trophy and the Lady Byng Memorial Trophy multiple times

Individual awards won by Detroit Red Wings players and staff
Award	Description	Winner	Season	References
Art Ross Trophy	Regular season scoring champion	Ted Lindsay	1949–50	
Art Ross Trophy	Regular season scoring champion	Gordie Howe	1950–51	
Art Ross Trophy	Regular season scoring champion	Gordie Howe	1951–52	
Art Ross Trophy	Regular season scoring champion	Gordie Howe	1952–53	
Art Ross Trophy	Regular season scoring champion	Gordie Howe	1953–54	
Art Ross Trophy	Regular season scoring champion	Gordie Howe	1956–57	
Art Ross Trophy	Regular season scoring champion	Gordie Howe	1962–63	
Bill Masterton Memorial Trophy	Perseverance, sportsmanship, and dedication to hockey	Brad Park	1983–84	
Bill Masterton Memorial Trophy	Perseverance, sportsmanship, and dedication to hockey	Steve Yzerman	2003–04	
Calder Memorial Trophy	Rookie of the year	Carl Voss	1932–33	
Calder Memorial Trophy	Rookie of the year	Jim McFadden	1947–48	
Calder Memorial Trophy	Rookie of the year	Terry Sawchuk	1950–51	
Calder Memorial Trophy	Rookie of the year	Glenn Hall	1955–56	
Calder Memorial Trophy	Rookie of the year	Roger Crozier	1964–65	
Calder Memorial Trophy	Rookie of the year	Moritz Seider	2021–22	
Conn Smythe Trophy	Most valuable player of the playoffs	Roger Crozier	1965–66	
Conn Smythe Trophy	Most valuable player of the playoffs	Mike Vernon	1996–97	
Conn Smythe Trophy	Most valuable player of the playoffs	Steve Yzerman	1997–98	
Conn Smythe Trophy	Most valuable player of the playoffs	Nicklas Lidstrom	2001–02	
Conn Smythe Trophy	Most valuable player of the playoffs	Henrik Zetterberg	2007–08	
Frank J. Selke Trophy	Forward who demonstrates the most defensive skill	Sergei Fedorov	1993–94	
Frank J. Selke Trophy	Forward who demonstrates the most defensive skill	Sergei Fedorov	1995–96	
Frank J. Selke Trophy	Forward who demonstrates the most defensive skill	Steve Yzerman	1999–2000	
Frank J. Selke Trophy	Forward who demonstrates the most defensive skill	Kris Draper	2003–04	
Frank J. Selke Trophy	Forward who demonstrates the most defensive skill	Pavel Datsyuk	2007–08	
Frank J. Selke Trophy	Forward who demonstrates the most defensive skill	Pavel Datsyuk	2008–09	
Frank J. Selke Trophy	Forward who demonstrates the most defensive skill	Pavel Datsyuk	2009–10	
Hart Memorial Trophy	Most Valuable Player	Ebbie Goodfellow	1939–40	
Hart Memorial Trophy	Most Valuable Player	Sid Abel	1948–49	
Hart Memorial Trophy	Most Valuable Player	Gordie Howe	1951–52	
Hart Memorial Trophy	Most Valuable Player	Gordie Howe	1952–53	
Hart Memorial Trophy	Most Valuable Player	Gordie Howe	1956–57	
Hart Memorial Trophy	Most Valuable Player	Gordie Howe	1957–58	
Hart Memorial Trophy	Most Valuable Player	Gordie Howe	1959–60	
Hart Memorial Trophy	Most Valuable Player	Gordie Howe	1962–63	
Hart Memorial Trophy	Most Valuable Player	Sergei Fedorov	1993–94	
Jack Adams Award	Coach of the year	Bobby Kromm	1977–78	
Jack Adams Award	Coach of the year	Jacques Demers	1986–87	
Jack Adams Award	Coach of the year	Jacques Demers	1987–88	
Jack Adams Award	Coach of the year	Scotty Bowman	1995–96	
James Norris Memorial Trophy	Defense player of the year	Red Kelly	1953–54	
James Norris Memorial Trophy	Defense player of the year	Paul Coffey	1994–95	
James Norris Memorial Trophy	Defense player of the year	Nicklas Lidstrom	2000–01	
James Norris Memorial Trophy	Defense player of the year	Nicklas Lidstrom	2001–02	
James Norris Memorial Trophy	Defense player of the year	Nicklas Lidstrom	2002–03	
James Norris Memorial Trophy	Defense player of the year	Nicklas Lidstrom	2005–06	
James Norris Memorial Trophy	Defense player of the year	Nicklas Lidstrom	2006–07	
James Norris Memorial Trophy	Defense player of the year	Nicklas Lidstrom	2007–08	
James Norris Memorial Trophy	Defense player of the year	Nicklas Lidstrom	2010–11	
King Clancy Memorial Trophy	Leadership qualities on and off the ice, and humanitarian contributions within their community	Brendan Shanahan	2002–03	
King Clancy Memorial Trophy	Leadership qualities on and off the ice, and humanitarian contributions within their community	Henrik Zetterberg	2014–15	
Lady Byng Memorial Trophy	Gentlemanly conduct	Marty Barry	1936–37	
Lady Byng Memorial Trophy	Gentlemanly conduct	Bill Quackenbush	1948–49	
Lady Byng Memorial Trophy	Gentlemanly conduct	Red Kelly	1950–51	
Lady Byng Memorial Trophy	Gentlemanly conduct	Red Kelly	1952–53	
Lady Byng Memorial Trophy	Gentlemanly conduct	Red Kelly	1953–54	
Lady Byng Memorial Trophy	Gentlemanly conduct	Earl Reibel	1955–56	
Lady Byng Memorial Trophy	Gentlemanly conduct	Alex Delvecchio	1958–59	
Lady Byng Memorial Trophy	Gentlemanly conduct	Alex Delvecchio	1965–66	
Lady Byng Memorial Trophy	Gentlemanly conduct	Alex Delvecchio	1968–69	
Lady Byng Memorial Trophy	Gentlemanly conduct	Marcel Dionne	1974–75	
Lady Byng Memorial Trophy	Gentlemanly conduct	Pavel Datsyuk	2005–06	
Lady Byng Memorial Trophy	Gentlemanly conduct	Pavel Datsyuk	2006–07	
Lady Byng Memorial Trophy	Gentlemanly conduct	Pavel Datsyuk	2007–08	
Lady Byng Memorial Trophy	Gentlemanly conduct	Pavel Datsyuk	2008–09	
Mark Messier Leadership Award	Leadership and contributions to society	Chris Chelios	2006–07	
NHL Foundation Player Award	Community service	Darren McCarty	2002–03	
NHL Foundation Player Award	Community service	Henrik Zetterberg	2012–13	
NHL Lifetime Achievement Award	Long term contributions to hockey	Gordie Howe	2007–08	
NHL Plus-Minus Award	Highest P Plus–minus	Paul Ysebaert	1991–92	
NHL Plus-Minus Award	Highest P Plus–minus	Vladimir Konstantinov	1995–96	
NHL Plus-Minus Award	Highest P Plus–minus	Chris Chelios	2001–02	
NHL Plus-Minus Award	Highest P Plus–minus	Pavel Datsyuk	2007–08	
Ted Lindsay Award	Most outstanding player in the regular season	Steve Yzerman	1988–89	
Ted Lindsay Award	Most outstanding player in the regular season	Sergei Fedorov	1993–94	
Vezina Trophy	Top goaltender	Normie Smith	1936–37	
Vezina Trophy	Top goaltender	Johnny Mowers	1942–43	
Vezina Trophy	Top goaltender	Terry Sawchuk	1951–52	
Vezina Trophy	Top goaltender	Terry Sawchuk	1952–53	
Vezina Trophy	Top goaltender	Terry Sawchuk	1954–55	
William M. Jennings Trophy	Fewest goals given up in the regular season	Chris Osgood	1995–96	
William M. Jennings Trophy	Fewest goals given up in the regular season	Mike Vernon	1995–96	
William M. Jennings Trophy	Fewest goals given up in the regular season	Chris Osgood	2007–08	
William M. Jennings Trophy	Fewest goals given up in the regular season	Dominik Hasek	2007–08	

== All-Stars ==
=== NHL first and second team All-Stars ===
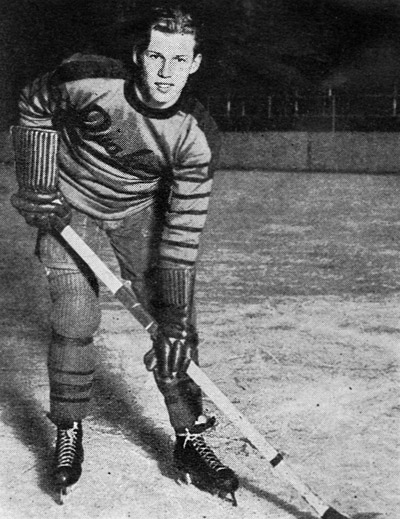
Syd Howe was a one-time second team All-Star

The NHL first and second team All-Stars are the top players at each position as voted on by the Professional Hockey Writers' Association. Gordie Howe has been selected twenty-one times, more than any other player in league history.

Detroit Red Wings selected to the NHL First and Second Team All-Stars
Player	Position	Selections	Season	Team
Sid Abel	Center	4	1941–42	2nd
Sid Abel	Center	4	1948–49	1st
Sid Abel	Center	4	1949–50	1st
Sid Abel	Center	4	1950–51	2nd
Jack Adams	Coach	3	1936–37	1st
Jack Adams	Coach	3	1942–43	1st
Jack Adams	Coach	3	1944–45	2nd
Larry Aurie	Right wing	1	1936–37	1st
Marty Barry	Center	1	1936–37	1st
Carl Brewer	Defenseman	1	1969–70	2nd
Chris Chelios	Defenseman	1	2001–02	1st
Paul Coffey	Defenseman	1	1994–95	1st
Roger Crozier	Goaltender	1	1964–65	1st
Pavel Datsyuk	Center	1	2008–09	2nd
Alex Delvecchio	Center	2	1952–53	2nd
Alex Delvecchio	Center	2	1958–59	2nd
Sergei Fedorov	Center	1	1993–94	1st
Bill Gadsby	Defenseman	1	1964–65	2nd
Gerard Gallant	Left wing	1	1988–89	2nd
Bob Goldham	Defenseman	1	1954–55	2nd
Ebbie Goodfellow	Defenseman	3	1935–36	2nd
Ebbie Goodfellow	Defenseman	3	1936–37	1st
Ebbie Goodfellow	Defenseman	3	1939–40	1st
Glenn Hall	Goaltender	2	1955–56	2nd
Glenn Hall	Goaltender	2	1956–57	1st
Flash Hollett	Defenseman	1	1944–45	1st
Marian Hossa	Right wing	1	2008–09	2nd
Gordie Howe	Right wing	21	1948–49	2nd
Gordie Howe	Right wing	21	1949–50	2nd
Gordie Howe	Right wing	21	1950–51	1st
Gordie Howe	Right wing	21	1951–52	1st
Gordie Howe	Right wing	21	1952–53	1st
Gordie Howe	Right wing	21	1953–54	1st
Gordie Howe	Right wing	21	1955–56	2nd
Gordie Howe	Right wing	21	1956–57	1st
Gordie Howe	Right wing	21	1957–58	1st
Gordie Howe	Right wing	21	1958–59	2nd
Gordie Howe	Right wing	21	1959–60	1st
Gordie Howe	Right wing	21	1960–61	2nd
Gordie Howe	Right wing	21	1961–62	2nd
Gordie Howe	Right wing	21	1962–63	1st
Gordie Howe	Right wing	21	1963–64	2nd
Gordie Howe	Right wing	21	1964–65	2nd
Gordie Howe	Right wing	21	1965–66	1st
Gordie Howe	Right wing	21	1966–67	2nd
Gordie Howe	Right wing	21	1967–68	1st
Gordie Howe	Right wing	21	1968–69	1st
Gordie Howe	Right wing	21	1969–70	1st
Syd Howe	Left wing	1	1944–45	2nd
Red Kelly	Defenseman	8	1949–50	2nd
Red Kelly	Defenseman	8	1950–51	1st
Red Kelly	Defenseman	8	1951–52	1st
Red Kelly	Defenseman	8	1952–53	1st
Red Kelly	Defenseman	8	1953–54	1st
Red Kelly	Defenseman	8	1954–55	1st
Red Kelly	Defenseman	8	1955–56	2nd
Red Kelly	Defenseman	8	1956–57	1st
Vladimir Konstantinov	Defenseman	1	1995–96	2nd
Nicklas Lidstrom	Defenseman	12	1997–98	1st
Nicklas Lidstrom	Defenseman	12	1998–99	1st
Nicklas Lidstrom	Defenseman	12	1999–2000	1st
Nicklas Lidstrom	Defenseman	12	2000–01	1st
Nicklas Lidstrom	Defenseman	12	2001–02	1st
Nicklas Lidstrom	Defenseman	12	2002–03	1st
Nicklas Lidstrom	Defenseman	12	2005–06	1st
Nicklas Lidstrom	Defenseman	12	2006–07	1st
Nicklas Lidstrom	Defenseman	12	2007–08	1st
Nicklas Lidstrom	Defenseman	12	2008–09	2nd
Nicklas Lidstrom	Defenseman	12	2009–10	2nd
Nicklas Lidstrom	Defenseman	12	2010–11	1st
Ted Lindsay	Left wing	9	1947–48	1st
Ted Lindsay	Left wing	9	1948–49	2nd
Ted Lindsay	Left wing	9	1949–50	1st
Ted Lindsay	Left wing	9	1950–51	1st
Ted Lindsay	Left wing	9	1951–52	1st
Ted Lindsay	Left wing	9	1952–53	1st
Ted Lindsay	Left wing	9	1953–54	1st
Ted Lindsay	Left wing	9	1955–56	1st
Ted Lindsay	Left wing	9	1956–57	1st
Frank Mahovlich	Left wing	2	1968–69	2nd
Frank Mahovlich	Left wing	2	1969–70	2nd
Johnny Mowers	Goaltender	1	1942–43	1st
John Ogrodnick	Left wing	1	1984–85	1st
Chris Osgood	Goaltender	1	1995–96	2nd
Marcel Pronovost	Defenseman	4	1957–58	2nd
Marcel Pronovost	Defenseman	4	1958–59	2nd
Marcel Pronovost	Defenseman	4	1959–60	1st
Marcel Pronovost	Defenseman	4	1960–61	1st
Bill Quackenbush	Defenseman	3	1946–47	2nd
Bill Quackenbush	Defenseman	3	1947–48	1st
Bill Quackenbush	Defenseman	3	1948–49	1st
Mickey Redmond	Right wing	2	1972–73	1st
Mickey Redmond	Right wing	2	1973–74	2nd
Leo Reise	Defenseman	2	1949–50	2nd
Leo Reise	Defenseman	2	1950–51	2nd
John Ross Roach	Goaltender	1	1932–33	1st
Terry Sawchuk	Goaltender	7	1950–51	1st
Terry Sawchuk	Goaltender	7	1951–52	1st
Terry Sawchuk	Goaltender	7	1952–53	1st
Terry Sawchuk	Goaltender	7	1953–54	2nd
Terry Sawchuk	Goaltender	7	1954–55	2nd
Terry Sawchuk	Goaltender	7	1958–59	2nd
Terry Sawchuk	Goaltender	7	1962–63	2nd
Brendan Shanahan	Left wing	2	1999–2000	1st
Brendan Shanahan	Left wing	2	2001–02	2nd
Normie Smith	Goaltender	1	1936–37	1st
Jack Stewart	Defenseman	5	1942–43	1st
Jack Stewart	Defenseman	5	1945–46	2nd
Jack Stewart	Defenseman	5	1946–47	2nd
Jack Stewart	Defenseman	5	1947–48	1st
Jack Stewart	Defenseman	5	1948–49	1st
Norm Ullman	Center	2	1964–65	1st
Norm Ullman	Center	2	1966–67	2nd
Cooney Weiland	Center	1	1934–35	2nd
Steve Yzerman	Center	1	1999–2000	1st
Henrik Zetterberg	Left wing	1	2007–08	2nd

=== NHL All-Rookie Team ===
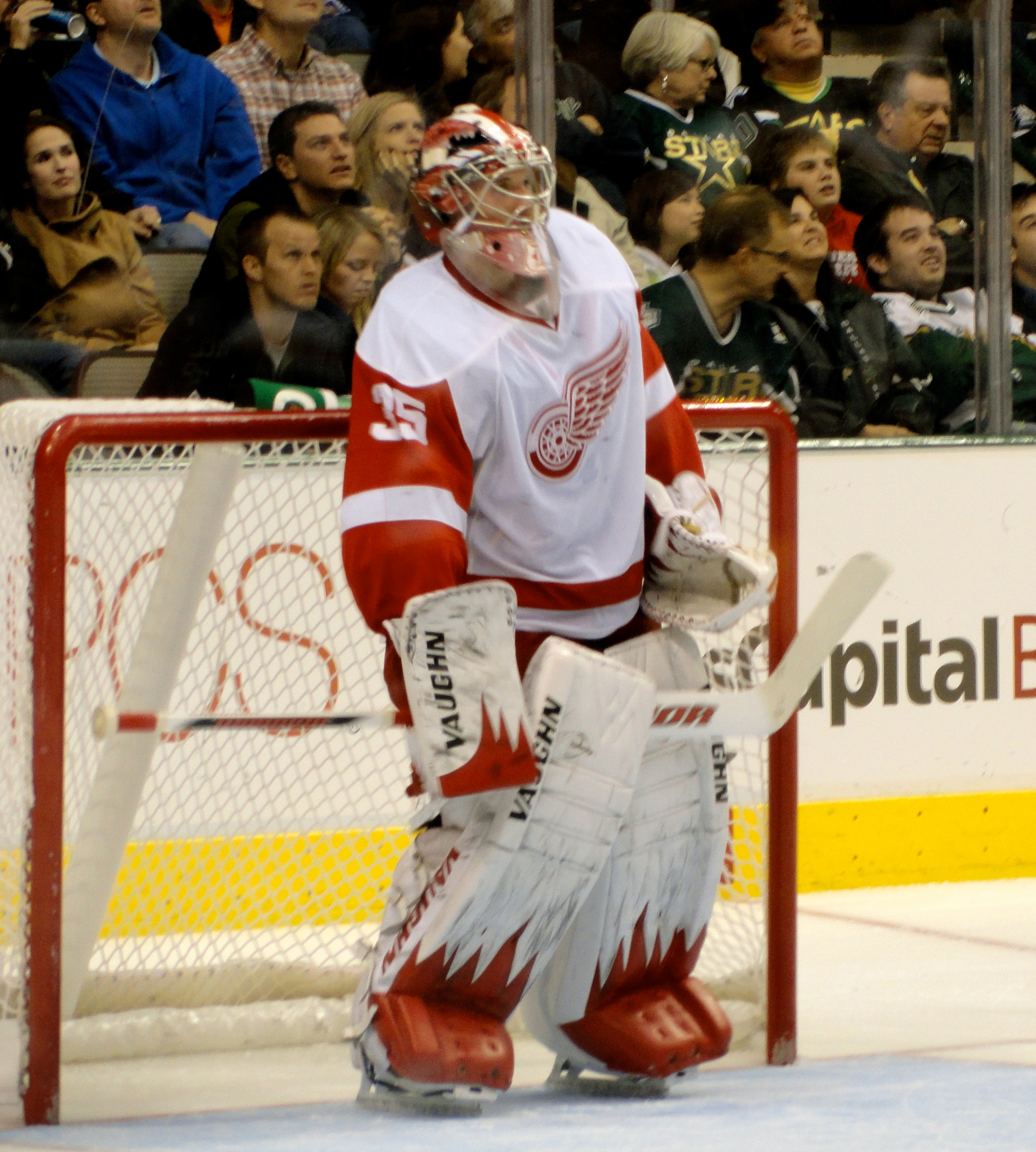
Jimmy Howard was named to the All-Rookie Team for the 2009–10 season

The NHL All-Rookie Team consists of the top rookies at each position as voted on by the Professional Hockey Writers' Association. Steve Yzerman was the first Red Wing selected, in the 1983–84 season. Goaltender Jimmy Howard is the most recently selected player, having been named to the team in 2009–10.

Detroit Red Wings selected to the NHL All-Rookie Team
Player	Position	Season
Sergei Fedorov	Forward	1990–91
Jimmy Howard	Goaltender	2009–10
Vladimir Konstantinov	Defenseman	1991–92
Nicklas Lidstrom	Defenseman	1991–92
Lucas Raymond	Forward	2021–22
Moritz Seider	Defenseman	2021–22
Steve Yzerman	Forward	1983–84
Henrik Zetterberg	Forward	2002–03

=== All-Star Game selections ===
The National Hockey League All-Star Game is a mid-season exhibition game held annually between many of the top players of each season. Sixty-four All-Star Games have been held since 1947, with at least one player chosen to represent the Red Wings in each year. The All-Star game has not been held in various years: 1979 and 1987 due to the 1979 Challenge Cup and Rendez-vous '87 series between the NHL and the Soviet national team, respectively, 1995, 2005, and 2013 as a result of labor stoppages, 2006, 2010, 2014 and 2026 because of the Winter Olympic Games, 2021 as a result of the COVID-19 pandemic, and 2025 when it was replaced by the 2025 4 Nations Face-Off.

Detroit has hosted five of the games. The 4th, 6th, 8th, and 9th games all took place at the Detroit Olympia. On October 8, 1950, the Red Wings, winner of the 1950 Stanley Cup Final, played a team of All-Stars in the 4th All-Star Game. Only 9,166 people attended the game, making it is the smallest attendance figure in All-Star Game history. Ted Lindsay scored the first hat trick in an All-Star Game, as the Red Wings won 7–1. The 6th All-Star Game was held on October 5, 1952. For the second year in a row, the format had the First and Second Team All-Stars, with additional players on each team, play each other. After the game ended in a tie for the second year in a row, the NHL decided that they would continue with the previous format of the Stanley Cup winner playing an all-star team. The Red Wings won both the 1954 Stanley Cup Final and the 1955 Stanley Cup Final and so hosted the 8th and 9th All-Star Games, each on October 2. The 1954 match ended in a 2–2 tie while the Red Wings won the 1955 game by a score of 3–1. The 32nd National Hockey League All-Star Game was held at Joe Louis Arena in Detroit on February 5, 1980. The Wales Conference all-star team won for the fifth consecutive time. Gordie Howe, then of the Hartford Whalers, appeared in his twenty-third and final All-Star game, his first twenty-two coming during his career in Detroit.

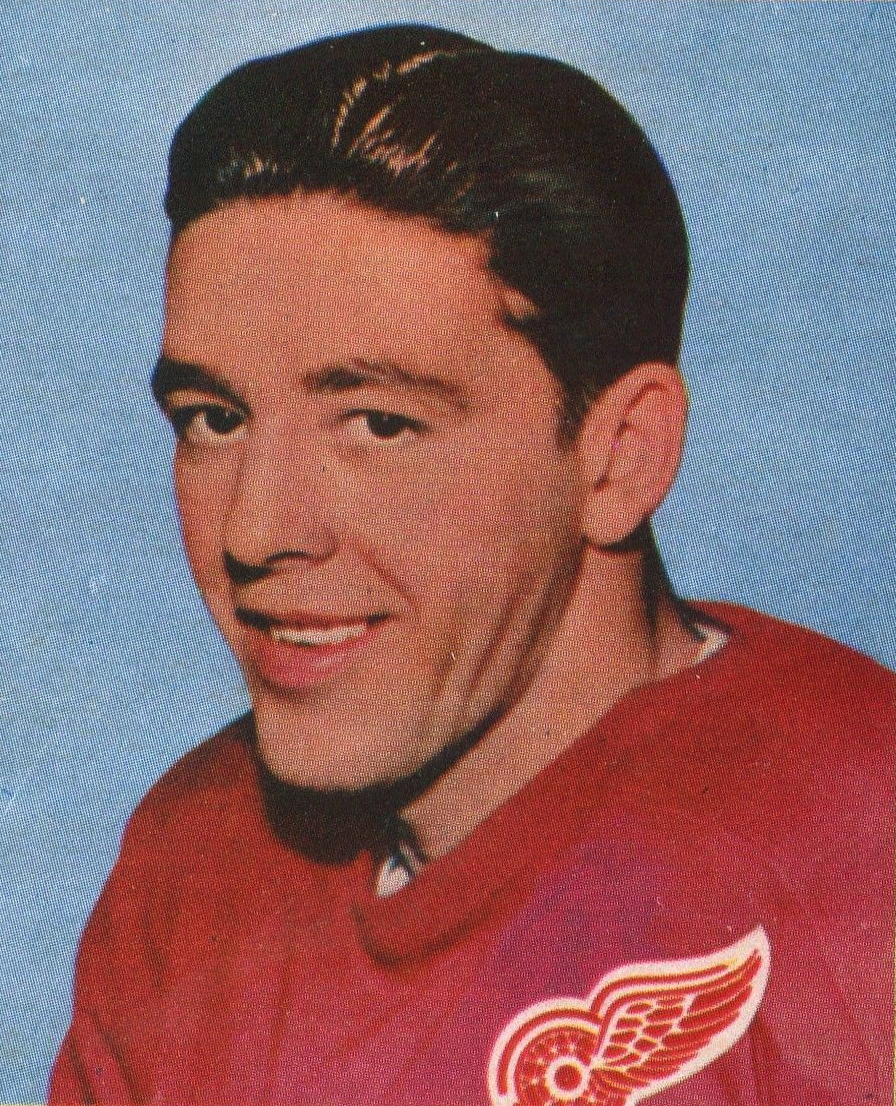
Marcel Pronovost played in 10 All-Star Games as a Red Wing

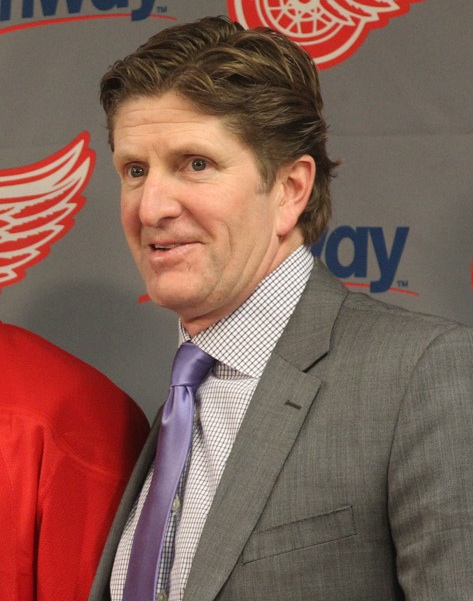
Mike Babcock has coached two All-Star Games

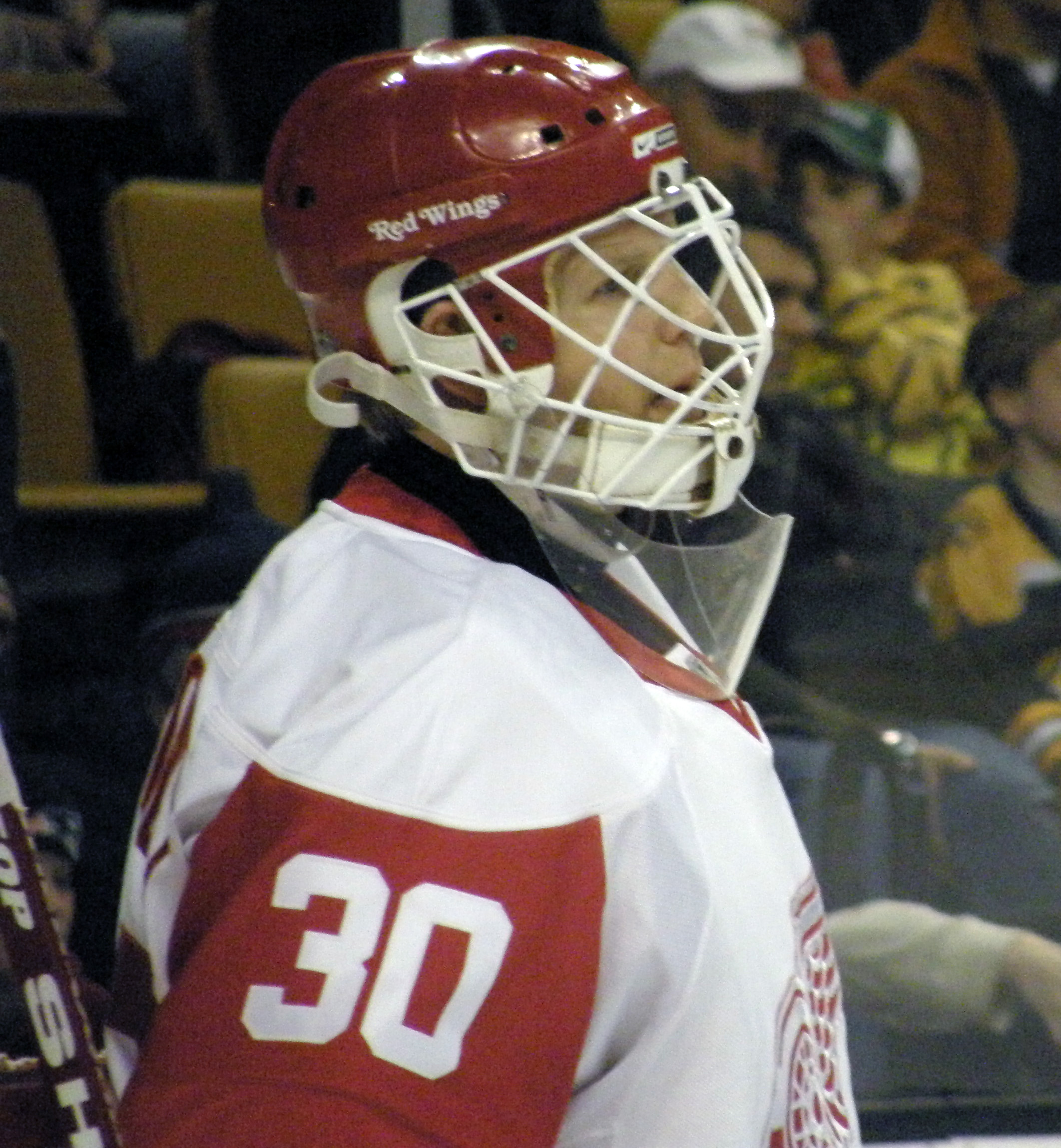
Chris Osgood was selected to play in two All-Star Games

Detroit Red Wings players and coaches selected to the All-Star Game
Game	Year	Name	Position	References
1st	1947	Ted Lindsay	Left wing	
1st	1947	Bill Quackenbush	Defenseman	
1st	1947	Jack Stewart	Defenseman	
2nd	1948	Gordie Howe	Right wing	
2nd	1948	Tommy Ivan	Coach	
2nd	1948	Ted Lindsay	Left wing	
2nd	1948	Bill Quackenbush	Defenseman	
2nd	1948	Jack Stewart	Defenseman	
3rd	1949	Sid Abel	Center	
3rd	1949	Gordie Howe	Right wing	
3rd	1949	Tommy Ivan	Coach	
3rd	1949	Ted Lindsay	Left wing	
3rd	1949	Jack Stewart	Defenseman	
4th	1950	Sid Abel	Center	
4th	1950	Steve Black	Left wing	
4th	1950	Joe Carveth	Right wing	
4th	1950	Gerry Couture	Center	
4th	1950	Lee Fogolin	Defenseman	
4th	1950	George Gee	Center	
4th	1950	Bob Goldham	Defenseman	
4th	1950	Gordie Howe	Right wing	
4th	1950	Tommy Ivan	Coach	
4th	1950	Red Kelly	Defenseman	
4th	1950	Ted Lindsay	Left wing	
4th	1950	Jim McFadden	Center	
4th	1950	Marty Pavelich	Left wing	
4th	1950	Jimmy Peters, Sr.	Right wing	
4th	1950	Marcel Pronovost	Defenseman	
4th	1950	Metro Prystai	Center	
4th	1950	Leo Reise	Defenseman	
4th	1950	Terry Sawchuk	Goaltender	
4th	1950	Gaye Stewart	Left wing	
5th	1951	Gordie Howe	Right wing	
5th	1951	Red Kelly	Defenseman	
5th	1951	Ted Lindsay	Left wing	
5th	1951	Leo Reise	Defenseman	
5th	1951	Terry Sawchuk	Goaltender	
6th	1952	Bob Goldham	Defenseman	
6th	1952	Gordie Howe	Right wing	
6th	1952	Tommy Ivan	Coach	
6th	1952	Red Kelly	Defenseman	
6th	1952	Tony Leswick	Left wing	
6th	1952	Ted Lindsay	Left wing	
6th	1952	Marty Pavelich	Left wing	
6th	1952	Terry Sawchuk	Goaltender	
6th	1952	Reg Sinclair	Right wing	
7th	1953	Alex Delvecchio	Center	
7th	1953	Gordie Howe	Right wing	
7th	1953	Red Kelly	Defenseman	
7th	1953	Ted Lindsay	Left wing	
7th	1953	Metro Prystai	Center	
7th	1953	Terry Sawchuk	Goaltender	
8th	1954	Keith Allen	Defenseman	
8th	1954	Marcel Bonin	Left wing	
8th	1954	Alex Delvecchio	Center	
8th	1954	Bill Dineen	Right wing	
8th	1954	Bob Goldham	Defenseman	
8th	1954	Gordie Howe	Right wing	
8th	1954	Red Kelly	Defenseman	
8th	1954	Tony Leswick	Left wing	
8th	1954	Ted Lindsay	Left wing	
8th	1954	Marty Pavelich	Left wing	
8th	1954	Don Poile	Center	
8th	1954	Marcel Pronovost	Defenseman	
8th	1954	Metro Prystai	Center	
8th	1954	Earl Reibel	Center	
8th	1954	Terry Sawchuk	Goaltender	
8th	1954	Jimmy Skinner	Coach	
8th	1954	Glen Skov	Center	
8th	1954	Johnny Wilson	Left wing	
8th	1954	Benny Woit	Defenseman	
9th	1955	Johnny Bucyk	Left wing	
9th	1955	Real Chevrefils	Left wing	
9th	1955	Norm Corcoran	Center	
9th	1955	Alex Delvecchio	Center	
9th	1955	Bill Dineen	Right wing	
9th	1955	Warren Godfrey	Defenseman	
9th	1955	Bob Goldham	Defenseman	
9th	1955	Glenn Hall	Goaltender	
9th	1955	Larry Hillman	Defenseman	
9th	1955	Gord Hollingworth	Defenseman	
9th	1955	Gordie Howe	Right wing	
9th	1955	Red Kelly	Defenseman	
9th	1955	Ted Lindsay	Left wing	
9th	1955	Marty Pavelich	Left wing	
9th	1955	Marcel Pronovost	Defenseman	
9th	1955	Earl Reibel	Center	
9th	1955	Ed Sandford	Left wing	
9th	1955	Jimmy Skinner	Coach	
9th	1955	Jerry Toppazzini	Right wing	
9th	1955	Norm Ullman	Center	
10th	1956	Alex Delvecchio	Center	
10th	1956	Glenn Hall	Goaltender	
10th	1956	Red Kelly	Defenseman	
10th	1956	Ted Lindsay	Left wing	
10th	1956	Jimmy Skinner	Coach	
11th	1957	Alex Delvecchio	Center	
11th	1957	Glenn Hall	Goaltender	
11th	1957	Gordie Howe	Right wing	
11th	1957	Red Kelly	Defenseman	
11th	1957	Ted Lindsay	Left wing	
11th	1957	Marcel Pronovost	Defenseman	
12th	1958	Alex Delvecchio	Center	
12th	1958	Gordie Howe	Right wing	
12th	1958	Marcel Pronovost	Defenseman	
13th	1959	Alex Delvecchio	Center	
13th	1959	Gordie Howe	Right wing	
13th	1959	Marcel Pronovost	Defenseman	
13th	1959	Terry Sawchuk	Goaltender	
14th	1960	Gordie Howe	Right wing	
14th	1960	Marcel Pronovost	Defenseman	
14th	1960	Norm Ullman	Center	
15th	1961	Sid Abel	Coach	
15th	1961	Alex Delvecchio	Center	
15th	1961	Gordie Howe	Right wing	
15th	1961	Marcel Pronovost	Defenseman	
15th	1961	Norm Ullman	Center	
16th	1962	Alex Delvecchio	Center	
16th	1962	Gordie Howe	Right wing	
16th	1962	Norm Ullman	Center	
17th	1963	Sid Abel	Coach	
17th	1963	Alex Delvecchio	Center	
17th	1963	Gordie Howe	Right wing	
17th	1963	Marcel Pronovost	Defenseman	
17th	1963	Terry Sawchuk	Goaltender	
17th	1963	Norm Ullman	Center	
18th	1964	Sid Abel	Coach	
18th	1964	Alex Delvecchio	Center	
18th	1964	Gordie Howe	Right wing	
19th	1965	Sid Abel	Coach	
19th	1965	Alex Delvecchio	Center	
19th	1965	Bill Gadsby	Defenseman	
19th	1965	Gordie Howe	Right wing	
19th	1965	Marcel Pronovost	Defenseman	
19th	1965	Norm Ullman	Center	
20th	1967	Sid Abel	Coach	
20th	1967	Alex Delvecchio	Center	
20th	1967	Gordie Howe	Right wing	
20th	1967	Norm Ullman	Center	
21st	1968	Gordie Howe	Right wing	
21st	1968	Norm Ullman	Center	
22nd	1969	Gordie Howe	Right wing	
22nd	1969	Frank Mahovlich	Left wing	
23rd	1970	Carl Brewer	Defenseman	
23rd	1970	Gordie Howe	Right wing	
24th	1971	Gordie Howe	Right wing	
25th	1972	Red Berenson	Center	
26th	1973	Gary Bergman	Defenseman	
27th	1974	Red Berenson	Center	
27th	1974	Mickey Redmond	Right wing	
28th	1975	Marcel Dionne	Center	
29th	1976	Dan Maloney	Left wing	
30th	1977	Nick Libett	Left wing	
31st	1978	Reed Larson	Defenseman	
32nd	1980	Reed Larson	Defenseman	
33rd	1981	Reed Larson	Defenseman	
33rd	1981	John Ogrodnick	Left wing	
34th	1982	John Ogrodnick	Left wing	
35th	1983	Willie Huber	Defenseman	
36th	1984	John Ogrodnick	Left wing	
36th	1984	Steve Yzerman	Center	
37th	1985	John Ogrodnick	Left wing	
38th	1986	John Ogrodnick	Left wing	
39th	1988	Bob Probert	Left wing	
39th	1988	Steve Yzerman	Center	
40th	1989	Steve Yzerman	Center	
41st	1990	Steve Yzerman	Center	
42nd	1991	Steve Yzerman	Center	
43rd	1992	Tim Cheveldae	Goaltender	
43rd	1992	Sergei Fedorov	Center	
43rd	1992	Steve Yzerman	Center	
44th	1993	Steve Chiasson	Defenseman	
44th	1993	Paul Coffey	Defenseman	
44th	1993	Steve Yzerman	Center	
45th	1994	Paul Coffey	Defenseman	
45th	1994	Sergei Fedorov	Center	
46th	1996	Scotty Bowman	Coach	
46th	1996	Paul Coffey	Defenseman	
46th	1996	Sergei Fedorov	Center	
46th	1996	Nicklas Lidstrom	Defenseman	
46th	1996	Chris Osgood	Goaltender	
47th	1997	Viacheslav Fetisov	Defenseman	
47th	1997	Brendan Shanahan	Left wing	
47th	1997	Steve Yzerman	Center	
48th	1998	Viacheslav Fetisov	Defenseman	
48th	1998	Igor Larionov	Center	
48th	1998	Nicklas Lidstrom	Defenseman	
48th	1998	Brendan Shanahan	Left wing	
49th	1999	Nicklas Lidstrom	Defenseman	
49th	1999	Larry Murphy	Defenseman	
49th	1999	Brendan Shanahan	Left wing	
50th	2000	Scotty Bowman	Coach	
50th	2000	Chris Chelios	Defenseman	
50th	2000	Nicklas Lidstrom	Defenseman	
50th	2000	Brendan Shanahan	Left wing	
50th	2000	Steve Yzerman	Center	
51st	2001	Sergei Fedorov	Center	
51st	2001	Nicklas Lidstrom	Defenseman	
52nd	2002	Scotty Bowman	Coach	
52nd	2002	Chris Chelios	Defenseman	
52nd	2002	Sergei Fedorov	Center	
52nd	2002	Dominik Hasek	Goaltender	
52nd	2002	Nicklas Lidstrom	Defenseman	
52nd	2002	Brendan Shanahan	Left wing	
53rd	2003	Sergei Fedorov	Center	
53rd	2003	Dave Lewis	Coach	
53rd	2003	Nicklas Lidstrom	Defenseman	
54th	2004	Pavel Datsyuk	Center	
54th	2004	Dave Lewis	Coach	
54th	2004	Nicklas Lidstrom	Defenseman	
55th	2007	Nicklas Lidstrom	Defenseman	
56th	2008	Mike Babcock	Coach	
56th	2008	Pavel Datsyuk	Center	
56th	2008	Nicklas Lidstrom	Defenseman	
56th	2008	Chris Osgood	Goaltender	
57th	2009	Mike Babcock	Coach	
57th	2009	Pavel Datsyuk	Center	
57th	2009	Nicklas Lidstrom	Defenseman	
58th	2011	Nicklas Lidstrom	Defenseman	
59th	2012	Pavel Datsyuk	Center	
59th	2012	Jimmy Howard	Goaltender	
60th	2015	Jimmy Howard	Goaltender	
61st	2016	Dylan Larkin	Center	
62nd	2017	Frans Nielsen	Center	
63rd	2018	Mike Green	Defense	
64th	2019	Jimmy Howard	Goaltender	
65th	2020	Tyler Bertuzzi	Left wing	
66th	2022	Dylan Larkin	Center	
67th	2023	Dylan Larkin	Center	
68th	2024	Alex DeBrincat	Right wing	

=== All-Star benefit games ===
Prior to the institution of the National Hockey League All-Star Game the league held three different benefit games featuring teams of all-stars. The first was the Ace Bailey Benefit Game, held in 1934, after a violent collision with Eddie Shore of the Boston Bruins left Ace Bailey of the Toronto Maple Leafs hospitalized and unable to continue his playing career. In 1937 the Howie Morenz Memorial Game was held to raise money for the family of Howie Morenz of the Montreal Canadiens who died from complications after being admitted to the hospital for a broken leg. The Babe Siebert Memorial Game was held in 1939 to raise funds for the family of the Canadiens' Babe Siebert who drowned shortly after he retired from playing.

Detroit Red Wings players and coaches selected to All-Star benefit games
Game	Year	Name	Position	References
Ace Bailey Benefit Game	1934	Larry Aurie	Right wing	
Ace Bailey Benefit Game	1934	Herbie Lewis	Left wing	
Howie Morenz Memorial Game	1937	Jack Adams	Coach	
Howie Morenz Memorial Game	1937	Marty Barry	Center	
Howie Morenz Memorial Game	1937	Ebbie Goodfellow	Defense	
Howie Morenz Memorial Game	1937	Normie Smith	Goaltender	
Babe Siebert Memorial Game	1939	Ebbie Goodfellow	Defense	
Babe Siebert Memorial Game	1939	Syd Howe	Right wing	

=== All-Star Game replacement events ===
Detroit Red Wings players and coaches selected to All-Star Game replacement events
Event	Year	Name	Position	References
4 Nations Face-Off	2025	Dylan Larkin (United States)	Center	
4 Nations Face-Off	2025	Lucas Raymond (Sweden)	Left Wing	

== Career achievements ==
=== Hockey Hall of Fame ===
Many members of the Red Wings organization have been inducted into the Hockey Hall of Fame. This list includes all personnel who have ever been employed by the Detroit Red Wings in any capacity and have also been inducted into the Hockey Hall of Fame.

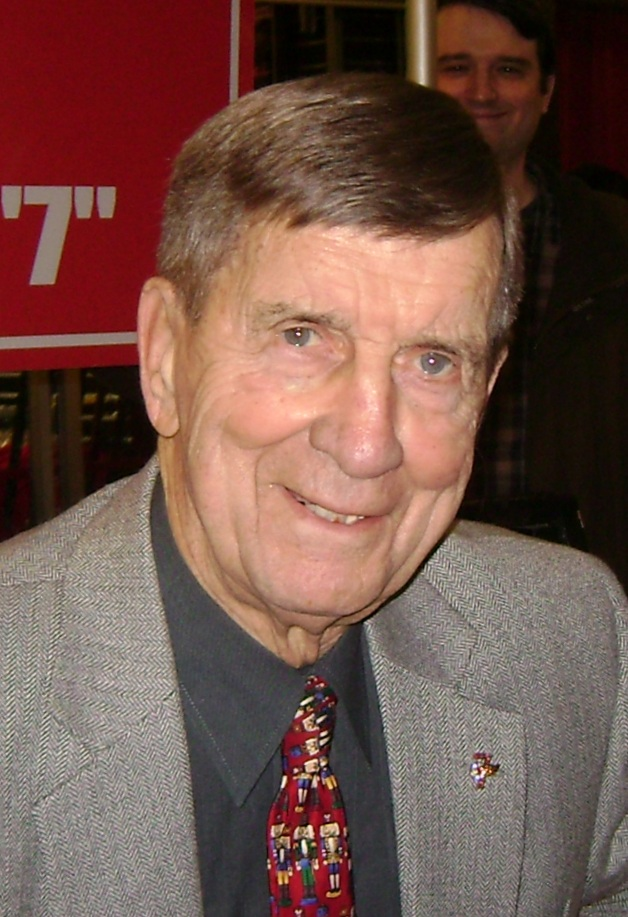
Ted Lindsay was inducted in 1966

Detroit Red Wings inducted into the Hockey Hall of Fame
Individual	Category	Year inducted	Years with Red Wings in category	References
Sid Abel	Player	1969	1938–52	
Jack Adams	Player	1959	none^{[c]}	
Daniel Alfredsson	Player	2022	2013–14	
Keith Allen	Builder	1992	none^{[d]}	
Al Arbour	Builder	1996	none^{[e]}	
Marty Barry	Player	1965	1935–39	
Andy Bathgate	Player	1978	1965–67	
Leo Boivin	Player	1986	1965–67	
Scotty Bowman	Builder	1991	1993–2002	
Johnny Bucyk	Player	1981	1955–57	
Colin Campbell	Builder	2024	1985–90	
Chris Chelios	Player	2013	1999–2009	
Dino Ciccarelli	Player	2010	1992–96	
Paul Coffey	Player	2004	1993–96	
Charlie Conacher	Player	1961	1938–39	
Roy Conacher	Player	1998	1946–47	
Alec Connell	Player	1958	1931–32	
Murray Costello	Builder	2005	none^{[f]}	
Pavel Datsyuk	Player	2024	2001–16	
Alex Delvecchio	Player	1977	1951–73	
Jim Devellano	Builder	2010	1982–present	
Marcel Dionne	Player	1992	1971–75	
Bernie Federko	Player	2002	1989–90	
Sergei Fedorov	Player	2015	1990–2003	
Viacheslav Fetisov	Player	2001	1995–98	
Frank Foyston	Player	1958	1926–28	
Frank Fredrickson	Player	1958	1926–27. 1930–31	
Bill Gadsby	Player	1970	1961–66	
Eddie Giacomin	Player	1987	1975–78	
Ebbie Goodfellow	Player	1963	1929–43	
Glenn Hall	Player	1975	1952–53, 1954–57	
Doug Harvey	Player	1973	1967	
Dominik Hasek	Player	2014	2001–02, 2003, 2006–08	
George Hay	Player	1958	1927–31, 1932–33	
Ken Holland	Builder	2020	1985–2019	
Hap Holmes	Player	1972	1926–28	
Marian Hossa	Player	2020	2008–09	
Gordie Howe	Player	1972	1946–71	
Mark Howe	Player	2011	1992–95	
Syd Howe	Player	1965	1934–46	
Brett Hull	Player	2009	2001–04	
Mike Ilitch	Builder	2003	1982–2017	
Tommy Ivan	Builder	1974	1947–54	
Duke Keats	Player	1958	1927	
Red Kelly	Player	1969	1947–60	
Brian Kilrea	Builder	2003	none^{[g]}	
Igor Larionov	Player	2008	1995–2000, 2000–03	
Herbie Lewis	Player	1989	1928–39	
Nicklas Lidstrom	Player	2015	1991–2012	
Ted Lindsay	Player	1966	1944–57, 1964–65	
Harry Lumley	Player	1980	1944–50	
Frank Mahovlich	Player	1981	1968–71	
Mike Modano	Player	2014	2010–11	
Larry Murphy	Player	2004	1997–2001	
Vaclav Nedomansky	Player	2019	1977–82	
Reg Noble	Player	1962	1927–32	
Bruce Norris	Builder	1969	1955–82	
James D. Norris	Builder	1962	1932–66	
James E. Norris	Builder	1958	1932–52	
Adam Oates	Player	2012	1985–89	
Brad Park	Player	1988	1983–85	
Bud Poile	Builder	1990	none^{[h]}	
Marcel Pronovost	Player	1978	1950–65	
Bill Quackenbush	Player	1976	1942–49	
Luc Robitaille	Player	2009	2001–03	
Jim Rutherford	Builder	2019	none^{[i]}	
Borje Salming	Player	1996	1989–90	
Terry Sawchuk	Player	1971	1949–55, 1957–64, 1968–69	
Earl Seibert	Player	1963	1943–46	
Brendan Shanahan	Player	2013	1996–2006	
Darryl Sittler	Player	1989	1984–85	
Jack Stewart	Player	1964	1938–50	
Tiny Thompson	Player	1959	1938–40	
Norm Ullman	Player	1982	1955–68	
Rogie Vachon	Player	2016	1978–80	
Mike Vernon	Player	2023	1995–97	
Carl Voss	Builder	1974	none^{[i]}	
Jack Walker	Player	1960	1926–28	
Harry Watson	Player	1994	1942–43, 1945–46	
Cooney Weiland	Player	1971	1933–35	
Arthur Wirtz	Builder	1971	1932–51	
Steve Yzerman	Player	2009	1983–2006	
John Ziegler	Builder	1987	1959–77	

=== Lester Patrick Trophy ===
Twenty-five members of the Red Wings organization have been honored with the Lester Patrick Trophy. The trophy has been presented by the National Hockey League and USA Hockey since 1966 to honor a recipient's contribution to ice hockey in the United States. This list includes all personnel who have ever been employed by the Detroit Red Wings in any capacity and have also received the Lester Patrick Trophy.

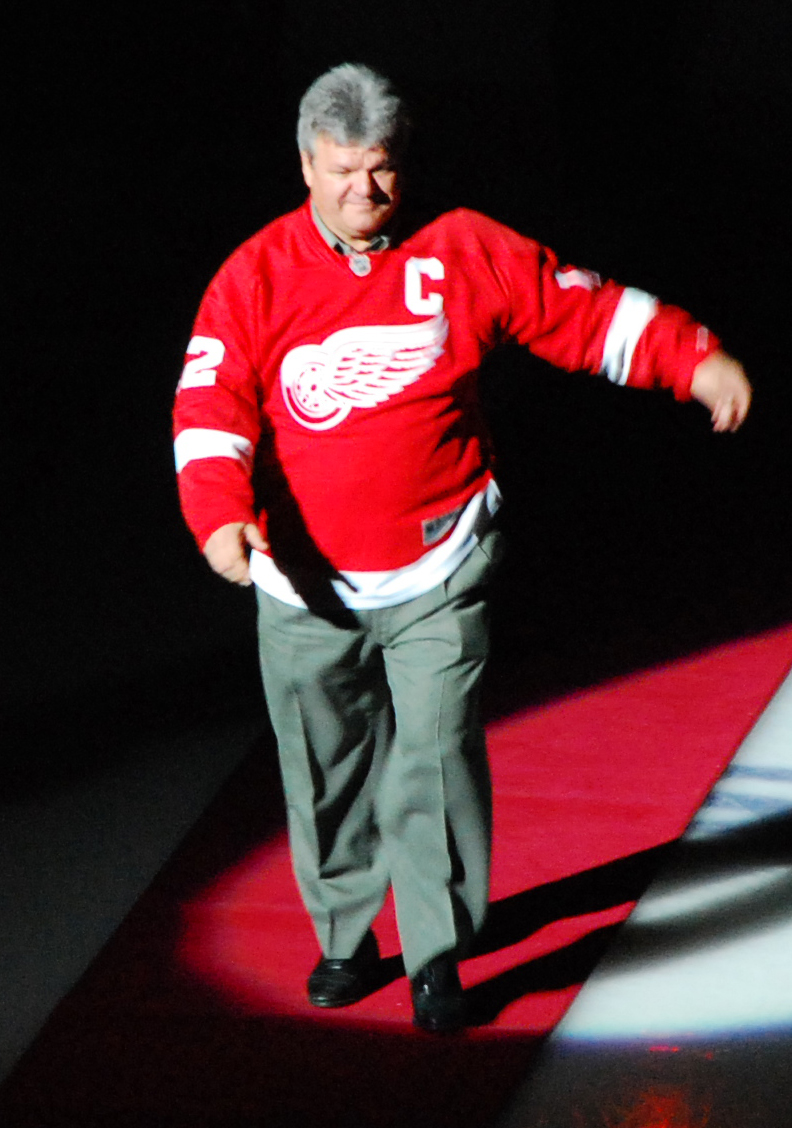
Marcel Dionne received the award in 2007

Members of the Detroit Red Wings honored with the Lester Patrick Trophy
Individual	Year honored	Years with Red Wings	References
Jack Adams	1965–66	1927–63	
Keith Allen	1987–88	1953–55	
Al Arbour	1991–92	1953–54, 1956–58	
Murray Armstrong	1976–77	1943–46	
Red Berenson	2006–07	1970–75	
Scotty Bowman	2000–01	1993–2008	
Johnny Bucyk	1976–77	1955–57	
Alex Delvecchio	1973–74	1951–77	
Jim Devellano	2008–09	1982–present	
Marcel Dionne	2006–07	1971–75	
Gordie Howe	1966–67	1946–71	
Mark Howe	2016–17	1992–95	
Mike Ilitch	1990–91	1982–2017	
Tommy Ivan	1974–75	1947–54	
Reed Larson	2006–07	1976–86	
Ted Lindsay	2007–08	1944–57, 1964–65	
Max McNab	1997–98	1947–51	
Bruce Norris	1975–76	1955–82	
James D. Norris	1971–72	1932–66	
James E. Norris	1966–67	1932–52	
Bud Poile	1988–89	1948–49	
Terry Sawchuk	1970–71	1949–55, 1957–64, 1968–69	
Cooney Weiland	1971–72	1933–35	
Steve Yzerman	2006–07	1983–2006	
John Ziegler	1983–84	1959–77	

=== Foster Hewitt Memorial Award ===
Four members of the Red Wings organization have been honored with the Foster Hewitt Memorial Award. The award is presented by the Hockey Hall of Fame to members of the radio and television industry who make outstanding contributions to their profession and the game of ice hockey during their broadcasting career.

Members of the Detroit Red Wings honored with the Foster Hewitt Memorial Award
Individual	Year honored	Years with Red Wings as broadcaster	References
Budd Lynch	1985	1949–2012	
Bruce Martyn	1991	1964–95, 1997	
Mickey Redmond	2011	1979–81, 1986–present	
Dave Strader	2017	1985–96	

=== Retired numbers ===
The Detroit Red Wings have retired nine numbers, which means that no player can use those uniform numbers again while part of the team. All of those players have been inducted into the Hockey Hall of Fame. The most recently retired number is that of Sergei Fedorov, whose number was retired on January 12, 2026.

The Red Wings have also made the number 6 of Larry Aurie and the number 16 of Vladimir Konstantinov no longer available for issue. However, the numbers are not considered to be officially retired. Although Aurie's uniform was retired in 1938 by James E. Norris, current team owner Mike Ilitch does not consider the number to be retired. Konstantinov's number has not been issued to any player since he was permanently disabled in a vehicle accident after the 1997 Stanley Cup Final. Number 99 is also unavailable due to having been retired by the league in honor of Wayne Gretzky.

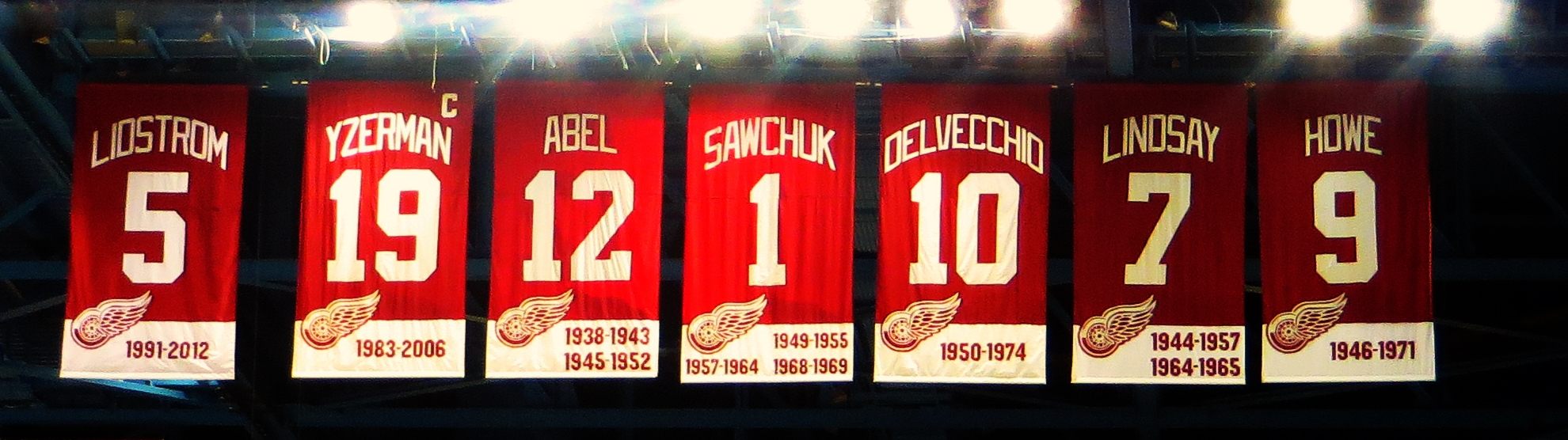
The banners with the retired numbers hanging at Joe Louis Arena.

Detroit Red Wings retired numbers
Number	Player	Position	Years with Red Wings as a player	Date of retirement ceremony	References
1	Terry Sawchuk	Goaltender	1949–55, 1957–64, 1968–69	March 6, 1994	
4	Red Kelly	Defense	1947–60	February 1, 2019	
5	Nicklas Lidstrom	Defense	1991–2012	March 6, 2014	
7	Ted Lindsay	Left wing	1944–57, 1964–65	November 10, 1991	
9	Gordie Howe	Right wing	1946–71	March 12, 1972	
10	Alex Delvecchio	Center	1950–73	November 10, 1991	
12	Sid Abel	Center	1938–52	April 29, 1995	
19	Steve Yzerman	Center	1983–2006	January 2, 2007	
91	Sergei Fedorov	Center	1990–2003	January 12, 2026	

== Other awards ==
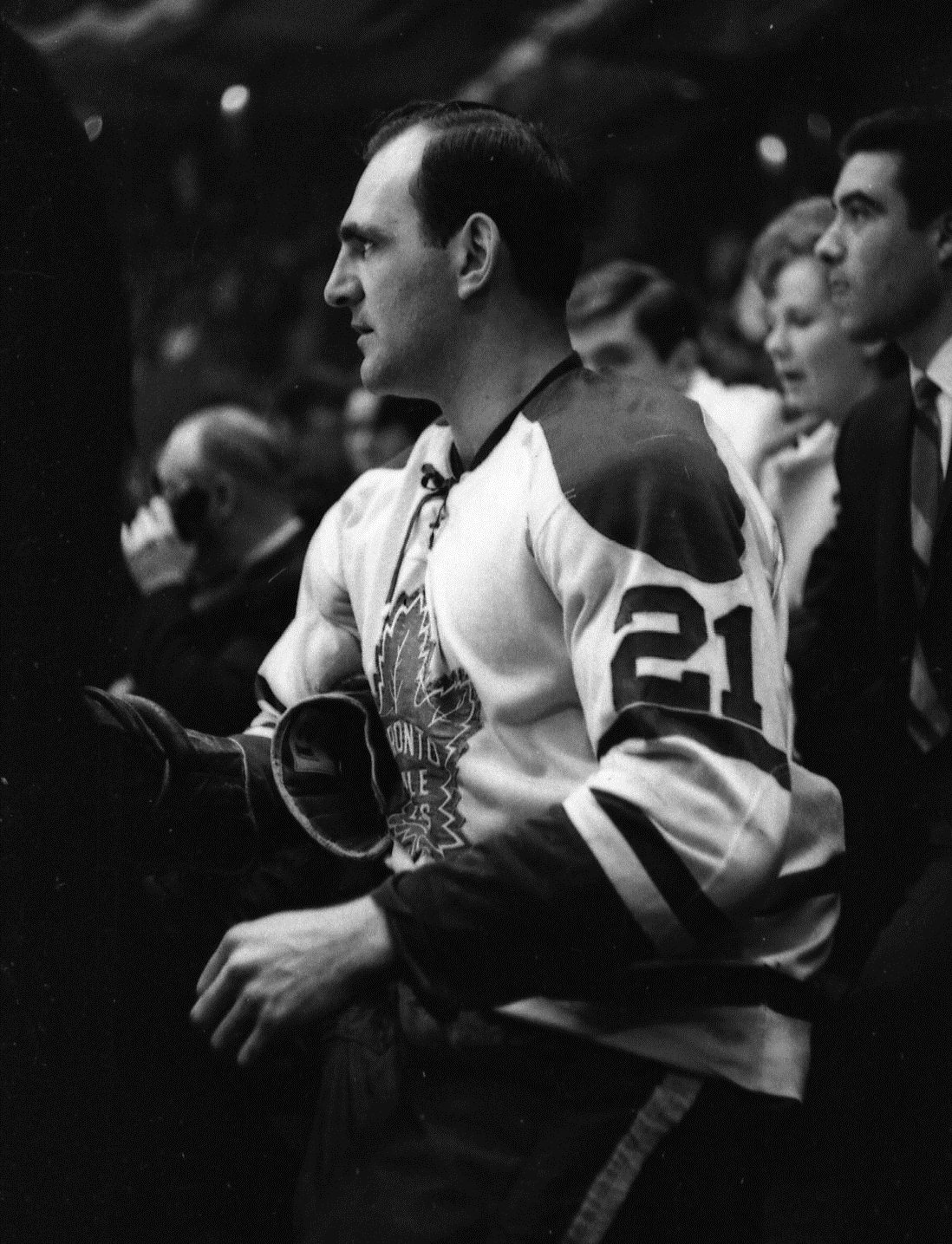
Bobby Baun won the Charlie Conacher Humanitarian Award in 1970

Members of the club have also won various non-league awards that are designated for or typically given to NHL players. Bobby Baun was awarded the Charlie Conacher Humanitarian Award in 1970 for his work in the community. Pavel Datsyuk has won the Kharlamov Trophy as the best Russian in the league while Nicklas Lidstrom and Henrik Zetterberg have been recognized as the best Swede in the league with the Viking Award.

Detroit Red Wings who have received non-NHL awards
Award	Description	Winner	Season	References
Charlie Conacher Humanitarian Award	For humanitarian or community service projects	Bobby Baun	1969–70	
Charlie Conacher Humanitarian Award	For humanitarian or community service projects	Gary Bergman	1972–73	
Golden Hockey Stick	Best Czech ice hockey player	Robert Lang	2003–04	
Kharlamov Trophy	Most valuable Russian player in NHL	Sergei Fedorov	2002–03	
Kharlamov Trophy	Most valuable Russian player in NHL	Pavel Datsyuk	2010–11	
Kharlamov Trophy	Most valuable Russian player in NHL	Pavel Datsyuk	2012–13	
Viking Award	Most valuable Swedish player in NHL	Nicklas Lidstrom	1999–2000	
Viking Award	Most valuable Swedish player in NHL	Nicklas Lidstrom	2005–06	
Viking Award	Most valuable Swedish player in NHL	Henrik Zetterberg	2006–07	
Viking Award	Most valuable Swedish player in NHL	Henrik Zetterberg	2007–08	
Viking Award	Most valuable Swedish player in NHL	Henrik Zetterberg	2012–13	

== See also ==
- List of National Hockey League awards
- List of NHL retired numbers
- List of members of the Hockey Hall of Fame
- List of Stanley Cup champions

== Footnotes ==
- ^{a} From 1993–94 through 2012–13, the Red Wings were members of the Western Conference. The NHL realigned prior to the 2013–14 season and the Red Wings were placed in the Atlantic Division of the Eastern Conference.
- ^{b} From 1927–28 through 1937–38, the Prince of Wales Trophy was awarded to the regular season champion of the American Division. From 1938-39 until 1966–67, the NHL had no divisions, and the trophy was given to the regular season champion of the league. The trophy is currently presented to the post season champion of the Eastern Conference.
- ^{c} Jack Adams was head coach of the Red Wings from 1927–28 to 1946–47 and was also general manager of the team from 1927–28 to 1961–62.
- ^{d} Keith Allen played for the Red Wings during the 1953–54 and 1954–55 seasons.
- ^{e} Al Arbour played for the Red Wings during the 1953–54, 1955–56, 1956–57, and 1957–58 seasons.
- ^{f} Murray Costello played for the Red Wings during the 1955–56 and 1956–57 seasons.
- ^{g} Brian Kilrea played for the Red Wings during the 1957–58 season.
- ^{h} Bud Poile played for the Red Wings during the 1948–49 season.
- ^{i} Carl Voss played for the Red Wings during the 1932–33 and 1933–34 seasons.
