= Artemi Panarin =

Russian ice hockey player (born 1991)

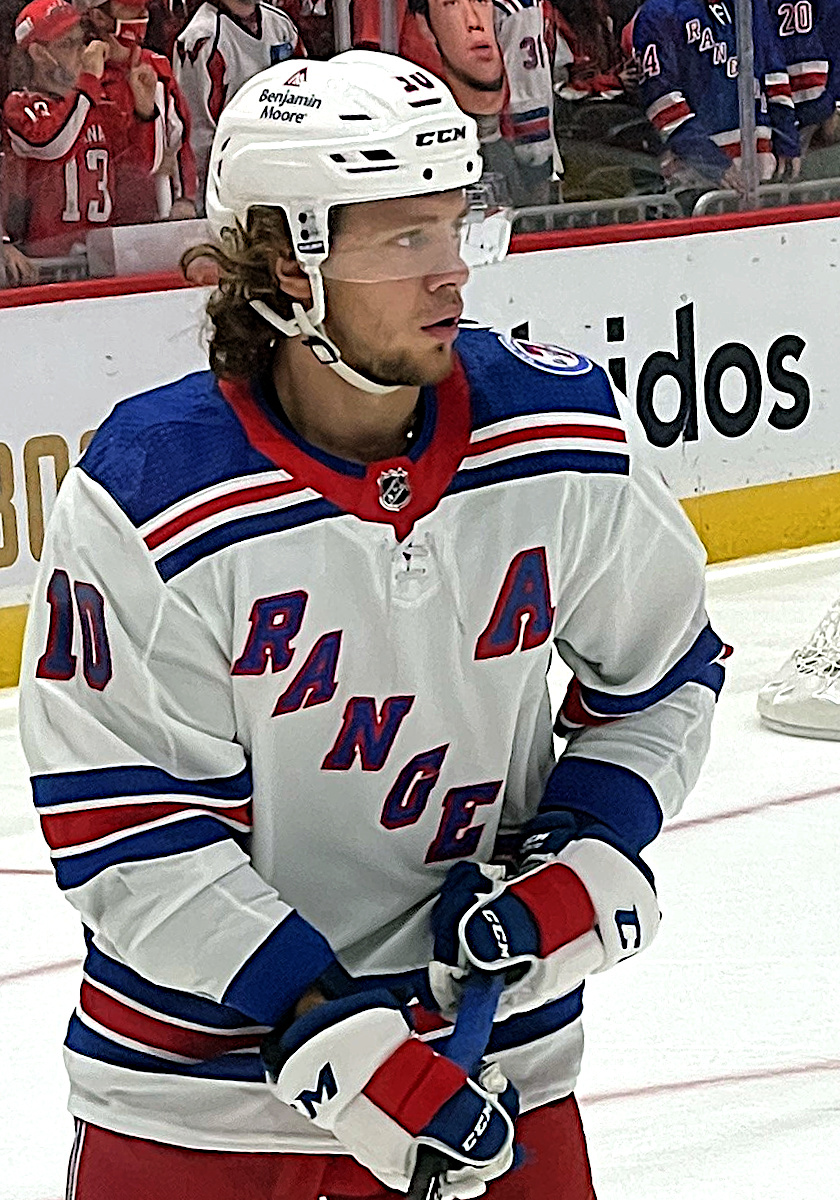
- Panarin with the New York Rangers in 2021
- Born: 30 October 1991 (age 35) Korkino, Russian SFSR, Soviet Union
- Height: 6 ft 0 in (183 cm)
- Weight: 173 lb (78 kg; 12 st 5 lb)
- Position: Left wing
- Shoots: Right
- NHL team Former teams: Los Angeles Kings; Vityaz Chekhov; Ak Bars Kazan; SKA Saint Petersburg; Chicago Blackhawks; Columbus Blue Jackets; New York Rangers
- National team: Russia
- NHL draft: Undrafted
- Playing career: 2008–present

Artemi Sergeyevich Panarin (Russian: Арте́мий Серге́евич Пана́рин; born 30 October 1991), nicknamed the "Breadman", or simply "Bread", is a Russian professional ice hockey player who is a left winger and alternate captain for the Los Angeles Kings of the National Hockey League (NHL). He has previously played for Vityaz Chekhov, Ak Bars Kazan, SKA Saint Petersburg, the Chicago Blackhawks, the Columbus Blue Jackets and the New York Rangers.

Originally an undrafted player, Panarin began his professional career playing in the Kontinental Hockey League in his native Russia. He made his NHL debut in 2015 after signing an entry-level contract with the Blackhawks. Panarin won the Calder Memorial Trophy in the 2015–16 season as the league's top rookie.

== Early life ==
Panarin was born into a Russian family and raised in Korkino; he is a Russian Orthodox Christian. He developed an early interest in ice skating. His maternal grandfather, a former amateur hockey player, encouraged Panarin to play hockey when he was five years old. He helped train Panarin and often drove him to hockey tournaments in Tyumen. Panarin attended the Traktor Ice Hockey school in Chelyabinsk, where he trained six days a week for six months a year.

== Playing career ==
=== KHL ===
Panarin was not selected in the 2010 NHL entry draft and began his professional hockey career in the Kontinental Hockey League (KHL) with HC Vityaz. On 31 January 2013, having produced 18 points in 40 games, Panarin was traded to SKA Saint Petersburg in exchange for a draft pick. In the 2014–15 season, Panarin recorded 26 goals and 62 points in 54 appearances for SKA. He played a significant role in the team's championship run, scoring 20 points in 20 playoff games. He was named to the KHL first all-star team for the 2014–15 season.

=== NHL ===
==== Chicago Blackhawks (2015–2017) ====
On 29 April 2015, Panarin signed a two-year, entry-level contract with the NHL's Chicago Blackhawks. He scored his first career NHL goal on 7 October 2015 against Henrik Lundqvist of the New York Rangers, the first goal scored by the newly defending Stanley Cup champion Blackhawks in their first game of the 2015–2016 season. On 17 February 2016, in another game against the Rangers, Panarin scored his first career NHL hat-trick. He appeared in 80 games for the Blackhawks during the 2015–16 season and recorded 30 goals and 47 assists for 77 points, which led all NHL rookies and ranked within the top-ten amongst all NHL skaters. Panarin found instant chemistry with Patrick Kane and fellow Russian Artem Anisimov on the Blackhawks' second line. Kane, who was the NHL's MVP and leading scorer in 2015–16, cited Panarin as a major contributor to his successful season. Panarin made his Stanley Cup playoff debut on 13 April in Game 1 of the first round series against the St. Louis Blues and scored his first playoff goal on 15 April in Game 2 against Blues' goaltender Brian Elliott. During the seven game first round exit in the playoffs, he registered seven points in all seven games played. Panarin was awarded the Calder Memorial Trophy, awarded to the NHL's top rookie, at the 2016 NHL Awards on 22 June. Panarin was also awarded the 2015–16 Kharlamov Trophy, given to the best professional Russian hockey player by the Russian Hall of Fame. He also earned a $2.55 million bonus pursuant to his contract for finishing the season in the top-ten among forwards in scoring. Panarin expressed his gratitude to Kane for helping him reach his contract incentives by gifting him a luxury watch.

In the 2016–17 season, his sophomore season at the NHL level, Panarin built upon his rookie season, continuing his offensive role playing alongside Kane and Anisimov on the Blackhawks second line. On 9 November 2016 in a game against the St. Louis Blues, Panarin recorded his first career Gordie Howe hat-trick by scoring the OT winning goal on Blues goaltender Jake Allen, an assist on another goal earlier in the game by Marián Hossa and participated in his first career fight with Blues' forward Scottie Upshall earlier in the game as well. On 26 December, Panarin signed a new two-year, $12 million contract with Chicago effective for the 2017–18 and 2018–19 seasons. He completed his second North American season scoring a career-best 31 goals in collecting 43 assists and 74 points in all 82 games played and was named to the NHL's Second All-Star Team.

==== Columbus Blue Jackets (2017–2019) ====
On 23 June 2017, Panarin was traded to the Columbus Blue Jackets (along with Tyler Motte and a sixth-round pick in the 2017 NHL entry draft) in exchange for Brandon Saad, Anton Forsberg, and a fifth-round pick in the 2018 NHL entry draft. On 8 December, Panarin had a record-tying achievement of picking up five primary assists in one game on goals by Pierre-Luc Dubois, Scott Harrington, Lukáš Sedlák, Zack Werenski and Alexander Wennberg to help Columbus defeat the New Jersey Devils 5–3. On 20 March 2018, Panarin scored his second career hat-trick (and added an assist on a goal by Markus Nutivaara) to clinch a 5–3 Columbus win over the New York Rangers. On 3 April, Panarin surpassed the Blue Jackets' franchise points record after scoring 80 points in 80 games, finishing the season with 82 points (27 goals, 55 assists) in 81 games. Panarin would also record two goals and five assists for seven points in all six games in the 2018 playoffs during the Blue Jackets first round loss to the eventual Stanley Cup champion Washington Capitals.

The following season, Panarin would break his own record, setting a new Blue Jackets-franchise point-scoring record with 87 points (28 goals, 59 assists) in 79 games to help the Blue Jackets clinch the eighth and final seed in the Eastern Conference for the playoffs. In the first round of the 2019 playoffs, Panarin and the Blue Jackets would stunningly sweep the Presidents' Trophy-winning Tampa Bay Lightning in four games marking the first playoff series win in Blue Jackets history and for Panarin's career. After sweeping the Lightning in the opening round, Panarin and the Blue Jackets would fall to the Boston Bruins in six games in the second round and Panarin would finish the playoffs with five goals and six assists for 11 points in all 10 games played.

==== New York Rangers (2019–2026) ====
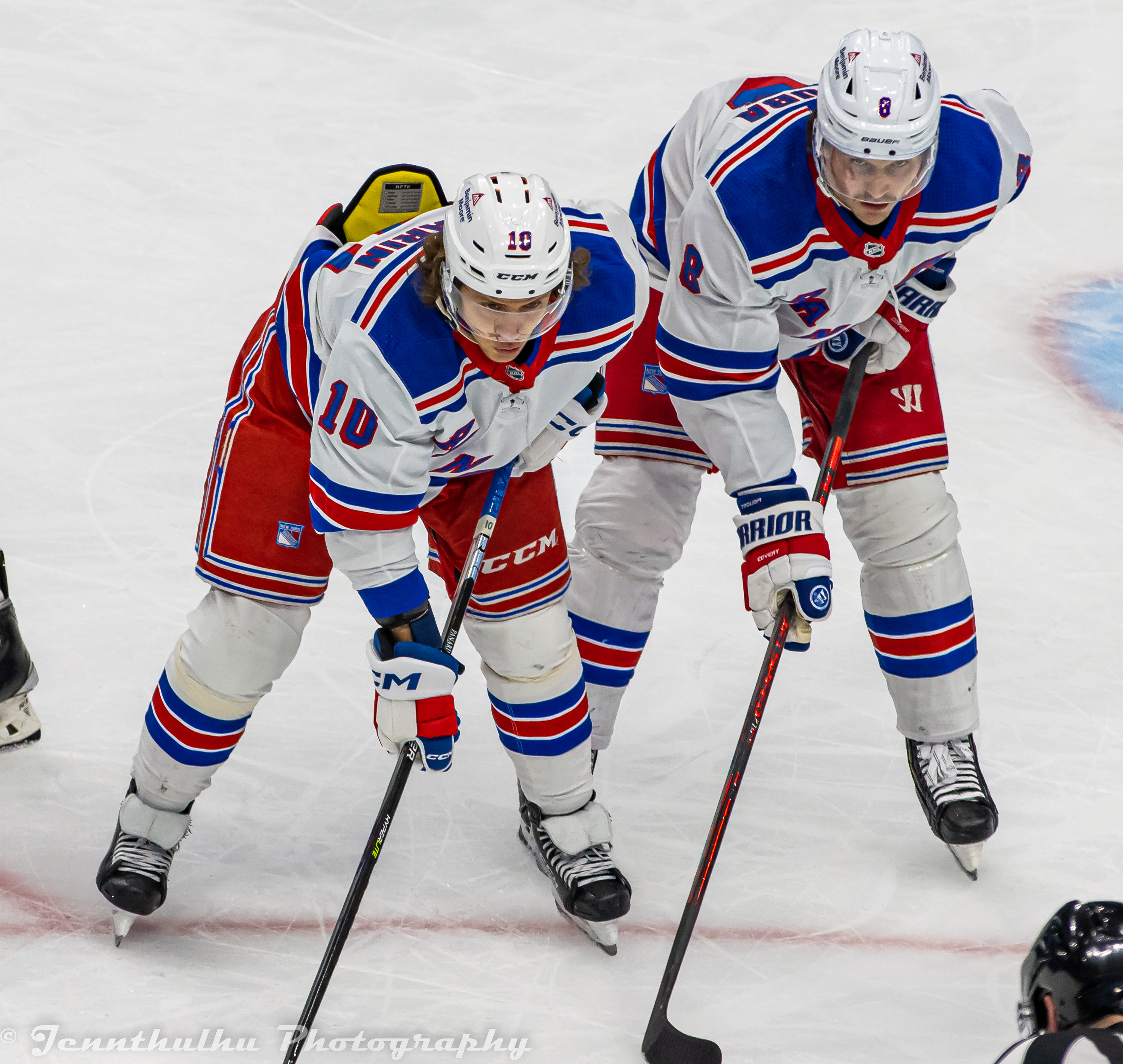
Panarin (left) beside teammate Jacob Trouba during a game in November 2022.

On 1 July 2019, Panarin signed a seven-year, $81.5 million contract with the New York Rangers, worth an annual average of $11.642 million. Panarin scored his first goal as a Ranger on a power play during the 2019–20 season opener against the Winnipeg Jets on 3 October, and also notched an assist on Jacob Trouba's first goal with the team. By 5 October, Panarin had the third-most assists and was tied for second in the NHL in points on the road since starting the start of his NHL career. On 9 January 2020, Panarin became the first player in Rangers history to have 60 points in the first 43 career games as a Ranger, edging out Wayne Gretzky who had 59. On 13 January, Panarin made Rangers history three times during a game against the New York Islanders. He became the first Ranger to record six three-point games in a nine-game span (six goals, 16 assists). He also became the second Ranger to record nine plus points in four consecutive games, and the second Ranger in last 40 seasons with 67 points through the team's first 45 games. Panarin concluded the shortened 2019–20 regular season by recording a career-high 95 points from 32 goals and 63 assists. He finished tied with David Pastrňák of the Boston Bruins for third overall in scoring among all NHL skaters. He was also a finalist for the Hart Memorial Trophy and Ted Lindsay Award, which both were eventually awarded to Leon Draisaitl of the Edmonton Oilers.

On 22 February 2021, Panarin announced he would take a personal leave of absence. He returned to practice with the Rangers on 10 March. Panarin was ruled out for the final three games of the season with a lower-body injury following an on-ice brawl with Washington Capitals forward Tom Wilson on 3 May. He finished the pandemic-shortened 2020–21 season with 17 goals and 41 assists in 42 games.

On 7 December 2022, during a game against the Vegas Golden Knights, Panarin recorded his 600th career point. Among active players at that time, he became the fifth fastest player to do so in 536 games, behind Evgeni Malkin (490), Alexander Ovechkin (464), Sidney Crosby (430), and Connor McDavid (421).

Panarin opened the 2023–24 season with a franchise-record 15-game point streak, eclipsing the 14-game point streak to open a season set by Rod Gilbert during the 1972–73 season. On 12 December 2023, during a game against the Toronto Maple Leafs, Panarin recorded his 700th NHL career point. On 13 January 2024, he became the fastest player in Rangers history to record 400 points in the fewest games with 310, surpassing Mark Messier (322), Brian Leetch (380), Phil Esposito (405), and Andy Bathgate (423). On 30 December 2024, he became the fastest player in Rangers history to record 500 points (384 games played), and later on 12 January 2026, became the fastest player to record 600 points (476 games played, surpassing Mark Messier (531).

==== Los Angeles Kings (2026–present) ====
On 16 January 2026, the Rangers announced that it would be retooling in the midst of a disappointing 2025–26 season. As part of this process, Panarin, who was in the final year of his contract, and his agent were informed privately that the team would not be offering him a contact extension. A few weeks later, on 4 February, Panarin was traded to the Los Angeles Kings in exchange for Liam Greentree, a conditional 2026 third-round pick, and a conditional 2028 fourth-round pick. The Rangers retained 50% of Panarin's contract in the trade. Panarin, who had a full no movement clause in his contract with New York, had only wanted to be traded to Los Angeles. On the same day, Panarin and the Kings agreed to a two-year, $22 million contract extension.

== International play ==
Artemi Panarin
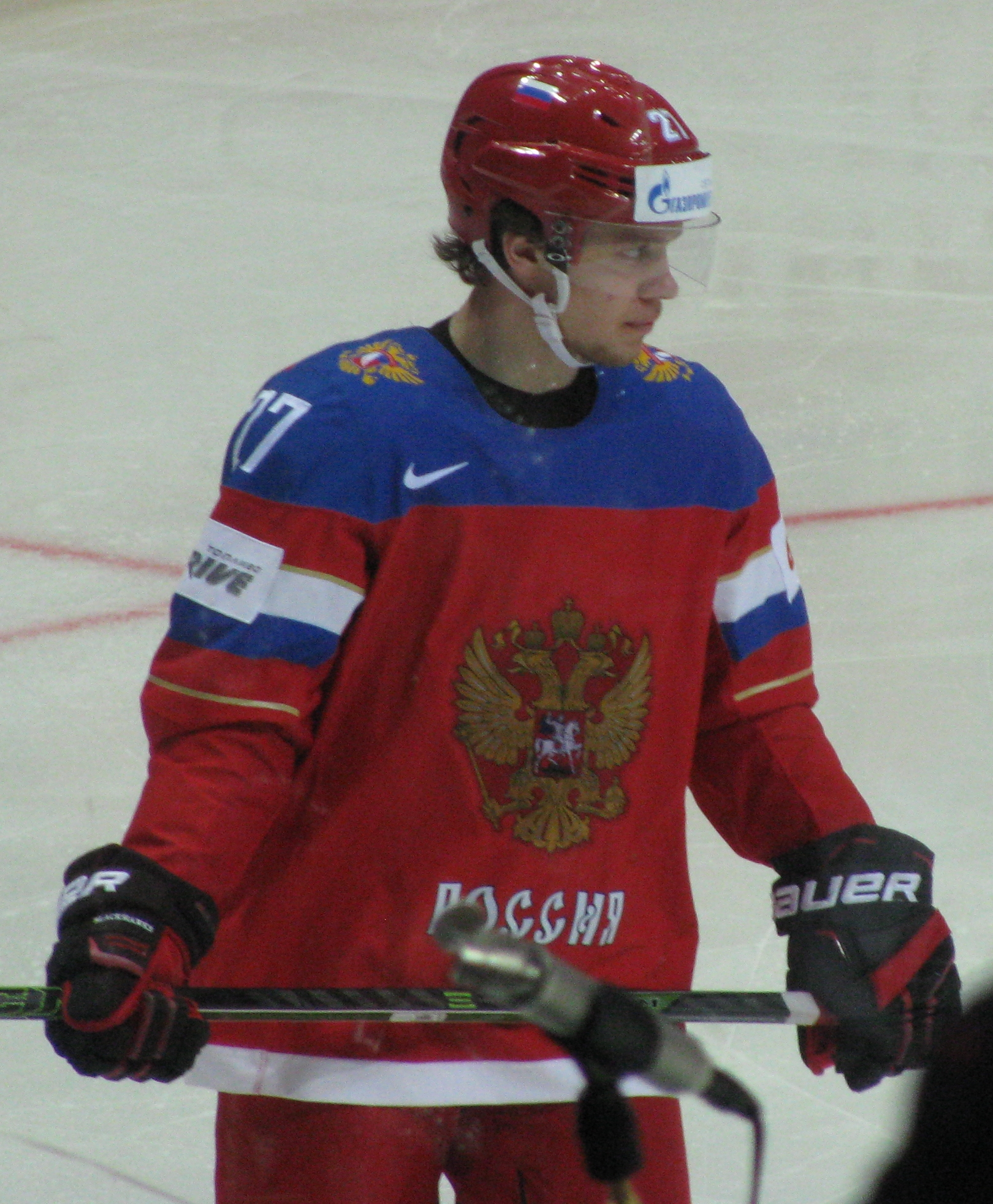
- Panarin playing for the Russia national team in 2016

Medal record

Men's ice hockey

Representing Russia

World Championships
Silver medal – second place	2015 Czech Republic	
Bronze medal – third place	2016 Russia	
Bronze medal – third place	2017 Germany/France	

World Junior Championships
Gold medal – first place	2011 United States	

=== Junior ===
Panarin was part of the Russia junior team that won a gold medal at the 2011 World Junior Championships. Russia was trailing Canada 3–0 in the third period of the championship game; Panarin made the score 3–1 with 17:27 remaining in the third period to prompt a Russia comeback. He would go on to score the game-winner with 4:38 left to play en route to a 5–3 Russia win.

=== Senior ===
Panarin made his Russia senior team debut, when he was included on the roster, in one of the rounds of Euro Hockey Tour in the 2013–14 season.

He was selected to the Russia's squad for the 2015 World Championship, earning a silver medal. He recorded 10 points in 10 games.

Panarin also played in the 2016 World Championship, where Russia earned a bronze medal. Early in the tournament, head coach Oleg Znarok formed a highly-productive line of Panarin (six goals and nine assists) and his former SKA Saint Petersburg teammates Vadim Shipachyov (six goals and 12 assists) and Evgenii Dadonov (six goals and seven assists). Panarin, Shipachyov and Dadonov finished as the top three scorers of the tournament.

Panarin represented Russia at the 2016 World Cup of Hockey.

== Personal life ==
Panarin moved to the United States in August 2015 after joining the Chicago Blackhawks. He did not speak English at the time and moved in with a Russian-born family who were Chicago residents. The family helped Panarin transition to his new surroundings and culture. Panarin also has a personal translator who helps him conduct interviews before and after games. His fellow Russian teammates, Viktor Tikhonov, who briefly played with the Blackhawks in 2015, and Artem Anisimov, also helped Panarin understand English while playing in North America. Panarin was affectionately nicknamed the "Breadman", a reference to the Panera Bread restaurant chain, by his teammates and coaches on the Blackhawks.

In a July 2019 interview with Vsemu Golovin, Panarin strongly criticised president of Russia Vladimir Putin, saying, "The mistake in our society is treating him like a superhuman. He is a regular person, like us, and he is serving us... Yes, to be a president you have to be smart and enlightened, but our biggest mistake, among many, is thinking that we have nobody better than Vladimir Vladimirovich. This is nonsense. How many million people live here? No question there is someone better." Sportsnet claimed that Panarin is by far the biggest Russian athlete to speak out against Putin, and Russian-American ice hockey reporter Slava Malamud, who translated the interview, claimed that it was unprecedented in Russian sports for someone of Panarin's caliber to be so critical of Putin.

On 22 February 2021, Panarin announced he would take a personal leave of absence after the Russian tabloid newspaper Komsomolskaya Pravda published allegations that he physically assaulted an 18-year-old woman in 2011, and bribed law enforcement to drop the charges. Panarin and the Rangers denied the story's veracity, stating: "This is clearly an intimidation tactic being used against [Panarin] for being outspoken on recent political events." The allegations were made by his former KHL coach Andrei Nazarov, who coached him during his time with Vityaz Chekhov. The story was released after Panarin voiced his support for Russian opposition leader Alexei Navalny, openly criticizing Putin. Nazarov said that he was motivated to make the allegations after Panarin voiced his support for anti-government protests in Russia. Nazarov claimed that Panarin's then teammate, Mikhail Anisin, was there at the incident. While Anisin confirmed there was an encounter with young women, he denied that there was any violence or bribery, and called the allegations "disgusting". Panarin returned to practice on 10 March.

On 17 April 2025, The Athletic reported that in 2024, the Rangers retained a law firm to investigate a former team employee's allegation that Panarin sexually assaulted her. Panarin and Madison Square Garden Sports, which owns the Rangers, paid settlements to the former employee without an admission of wrongdoing. The terms of the settlement included a non-disclosure agreement.

== Career statistics ==
=== Regular season and playoffs ===
			Regular season					Playoffs
Season	Team	League	GP	G	A	Pts	PIM	GP	G	A	Pts	PIM
2008–09	Vityaz Chekhov	KHL	5	0	1	1	2	—	—	—	—	—
2008–09	Vityaz Chekhov–2	RUS.3	62	29	39	68	70	13	4	5	9	28
2009–10	Russkie Vityazi	MHL	38	20	24	44	55	3	1	2	3	0
2009–10	Vityaz Chekhov	KHL	20	1	8	9	16	—	—	—	—	—
2010–11	Russkie Vityazi	MHL	13	5	12	17	22	—	—	—	—	—
2010–11	Vityaz Chekhov	KHL	40	5	16	21	8	—	—	—	—	—
2011–12	Vityaz Chekhov	KHL	38	12	14	26	49	—	—	—	—	—
2011–12	Ak Bars Kazan	KHL	12	1	4	5	4	4	0	0	0	0
2012–13	Vityaz Chekhov	KHL	40	11	7	18	22	—	—	—	—	—
2012–13	SKA Saint Petersburg	KHL	3	0	1	1	2	14	2	7	9	0
2013–14	SKA Saint Petersburg	KHL	51	20	20	40	30	4	0	0	0	2
2014–15	SKA Saint Petersburg	KHL	54	26	36	62	37	20	5	15	20	4
2015–16	Chicago Blackhawks	NHL	80	30	47	77	32	7	2	5	7	14
2016–17	Chicago Blackhawks	NHL	82	31	43	74	21	4	0	1	1	0
2017–18	Columbus Blue Jackets	NHL	81	27	55	82	26	6	2	5	7	6
2018–19	Columbus Blue Jackets	NHL	79	28	59	87	23	10	5	6	11	0
2019–20	New York Rangers	NHL	69	32	63	95	20	3	1	1	2	0
2020–21	New York Rangers	NHL	42	17	41	58	6	—	—	—	—	—
2021–22	New York Rangers	NHL	75	22	74	96	18	20	6	10	16	8
2022–23	New York Rangers	NHL	82	29	63	92	36	7	0	2	2	2
2023–24	New York Rangers	NHL	82	49	71	120	24	16	5	10	15	4
2024–25	New York Rangers	NHL	80	37	52	89	16	—	—	—	—	—
2025–26	New York Rangers	NHL	52	19	38	57	14	—	—	—	—	—
2025–26	Los Angeles Kings	NHL	26	9	18	27	6	4	2	1	3	0
KHL totals			263	76	107	183	170	42	7	22	29	6
NHL totals			830	330	624	954	242	77	23	41	64	34

=== International ===
Year	Team	Event	Result	GP	G	A	Pts	PIM
2011	Russia	WJC	1st place, gold medalist(s)	7	3	2	5	4
2015	Russia	WC	2nd place, silver medalist(s)	10	5	5	10	4
2016	Russia	WC	3rd place, bronze medalist(s)	10	6	9	15	4
2016	Russia	WCH	4th	4	1	1	2	4
2017	Russia	WC	3rd place, bronze medalist(s)	9	4	13	17	4
Junior totals				7	3	2	5	4
Senior totals				33	16	28	44	16

== Awards and honours ==
Award	Year	Ref
KHL
KHL All-Star Game	2015	
KHL First All-Star Team	2015	
Gagarin Cup champion	2015	
NHL
NHL All-Rookie team	2016	
Calder Memorial Trophy	2016	
NHL Second All-Star team	2017, 2023	
NHL All-Star Game	2020, 2023	
NHL First All-Star team	2020, 2024	
International
WC Top 3 player on Team	2015, 2017	
Kharlamov Trophy	2016	
WC All-Star Team	2017	
WC Best Forward	2017	

Awards and achievements
Preceded by Aaron Ekblad	Winner of the Calder Trophy; 2016	Succeeded by Auston Matthews
