= Kharlamov Trophy =

Russian ice hockey award

The Kharlamov Trophy is an ice hockey award given to the best Russian player of the previous season.

The current winner, for the 2024–25 season is Alexander Ovechkin.

== History ==
The Trophy was established by Sovetsky Sport in 2002, and is named after the legendary Soviet ice hockey player Valeri Kharlamov. Presentation of the award and the ceremony are held by Sovetsky Sport every summer in Moscow.

=== 2002–2015: Best Russian Player in the NHL ===
Between 2002 and 2015 only players from the NHL were eligible for the award. Voting took place at the conclusion of each season. Every Russian player, who'd played at least one game in the NHL during that season, would be allowed to name his top 3 candidates in a 1st-2nd-3rd format. Players could not vote for themselves.

The award was a de facto, Best Russian NHL player award.

=== 2016–present: Best Russian Player in the World ===
Starting with the 2016 award, the voting participation as well as eligibility rules were greatly modified.

Eligibility was expanded, to any Russian player from the National Hockey League or the Kontinental Hockey League. As the KHL is a predominantly Russian league, the number of potential contenders for the award is now in the hundreds.

With the number of candidates heavily increased, the voting process was revamped as well. With the 2016 award onward, a shortlist of the 20 best players from the NHL and KHL is compiled. It is then voted on by a selection committee composed of five groups of experts, each consisting of 13 individuals, plus the past award winners.

The trophy was not awarded between 2019 and 2024. In 2025, the first winner after the hiatus was Alexander Ovechkin, who had beaten the NHL's regular season goals record previously that year.

== Voting membership ==
1. Committee of the Russian Hall of Fame
2. Russian hockey veterans/legends
3. Group of KHL general managers
4. Russian hockey press/writers
5. Television commentators
6. Past winners of the award

== List of winners ==
Player is still active in the NHL or KHL

Kharlamov Trophy winners
| Season | Winner | Team | League | Win # |
|---|---|---|---|---|
| 2003 | Sergei Fedorov | Detroit Red Wings | NHL | 1 |
| 2004 | Ilya Kovalchuk | Atlanta Thrashers | NHL | 1 |
| 2005 (Note: No winner because of the 2004–05 NHL lockout) | — | — | — | — |
| 2006 | Alexander Ovechkin | Washington Capitals | NHL | 1 |
| 2007 | Alexander Ovechkin | Washington Capitals | NHL | 2 |
| 2008 | Alexander Ovechkin | Washington Capitals | NHL | 3 |
| 2009 | Alexander Ovechkin | Washington Capitals | NHL | 4 |
| 2010 | Alexander Ovechkin | Washington Capitals | NHL | 5 |
| 2011 | Pavel Datsyuk | Detroit Red Wings | NHL | 1 |
| 2012 | Evgeni Malkin | Pittsburgh Penguins | NHL | 1 |
| 2013 | Pavel Datsyuk | Detroit Red Wings | NHL | 2 |
| 2014 | Alexander Ovechkin | Washington Capitals | NHL | 6 |
| 2015 | Alexander Ovechkin | Washington Capitals | NHL | 7 |
| 2016 | Artemi Panarin | Chicago Blackhawks | NHL | 1 |
| 2017 | Evgeni Malkin | Pittsburgh Penguins | NHL | 2 |
| 2018 | Alexander Ovechkin | Washington Capitals | NHL | 8 |
| 2019 | Nikita Kucherov | Tampa Bay Lightning | NHL | 1 |
| 2025 | Alexander Ovechkin | Washington Capitals | NHL | 9 |

== See also ==
- Viking Award
