= Viking Award =

Award for Swedish ice hockey players

- Date: 1976–2019
- Country: Sweden

The Viking Award was awarded annually to the best Swedish ice hockey player in North America. Arranged by travel agency Björk & Boström, the winner was decided by a vote among all Swedish-born players participating in the NHL or the NHL farm-team leagues. Mats Sundin received the award four times, the most for any player. Five players received the award three times (shown in order of third award date): Börje Salming, Peter Forsberg, Markus Näslund, Henrik Zetterberg and Erik Karlsson. The Viking Award has not been awarded since the 2018–19 NHL season.

== Winners ==
Season	Winner	Team	Position	Win #
1975–76	Börje Salming	Toronto Maple Leafs	D	1
1976–77	Börje Salming	Toronto Maple Leafs	D	2
1977–78	Ulf Nilsson	Winnipeg Jets	C	1
1978–79	Börje Salming	Toronto Maple Leafs	D	3
1979–80	Anders Hedberg	New York Rangers	RW	1
1980–81	Kent Nilsson	Calgary Flames	C	1
1981–82	Thomas Gradin	Vancouver Canucks	C	1
1982–83	Pelle Lindbergh	Philadelphia Flyers	G	1
1983–84	Patrik Sundström	Vancouver Canucks	F	1
1984–85	Mats Näslund	Montreal Canadiens	LW	1
1985–86	Mats Näslund	Montreal Canadiens	LW	2
1986–87	Tomas Sandström	New York Rangers	RW	1
1987–88	Håkan Loob	Calgary Flames	RW	1
1988–89	Patrik Sundström	New Jersey Devils	F	2
1989–90	Thomas Steen	Winnipeg Jets	F	1
1990–91	Tomas Sandström	Los Angeles Kings	RW	2
1991–92	Calle Johansson	Washington Capitals	D	1
1992–93	Mats Sundin	Quebec Nordiques	C	1
1993–94	Mats Sundin	Quebec Nordiques	C	2
1994–95	Mikael Renberg	Philadelphia Flyers	RW	1
1995–96	Peter Forsberg	Colorado Avalanche	C	1
1996–97	Mats Sundin	Toronto Maple Leafs	C	3
1997–98	Peter Forsberg	Colorado Avalanche	C	2
1998–99	Peter Forsberg	Colorado Avalanche	C	3
1999–2000	Nicklas Lidström	Detroit Red Wings	D	1
2000–01	Markus Näslund	Vancouver Canucks	LW	1
2001–02	Mats Sundin	Toronto Maple Leafs	C	4
2002–03	Markus Näslund	Vancouver Canucks	LW	2
2003–04	Markus Näslund	Vancouver Canucks	LW	3
2004–05	No prize was awarded due to 2004–05 NHL lockout			
2005–06	Nicklas Lidström	Detroit Red Wings	D	2
2006-07	Henrik Zetterberg	Detroit Red Wings	LW	1
2007–08	Henrik Zetterberg	Detroit Red Wings	LW	2
2008–09	Nicklas Bäckström	Washington Capitals	C	1
2009–10	Henrik Sedin	Vancouver Canucks	C	1
2010–11	Daniel Sedin	Vancouver Canucks	LW	1
2011–12	Erik Karlsson	Ottawa Senators	D	1
2012–13	Henrik Zetterberg	Detroit Red Wings	LW	3
2013–14	Alexander Steen	St. Louis Blues	LW	1
2014–15	Nicklas Bäckström	Washington Capitals	C	2
2015–16	Erik Karlsson	Ottawa Senators	D	2
2016–17	Erik Karlsson	Ottawa Senators	D	3
2017–18	William Karlsson	Vegas Golden Knights	C	1
2018–19	Elias Lindholm	Calgary Flames	C	1
2019–20	No prize was awarded due to impact on NHL of the COVID-19 pandemic			
2020–21	No prize was awarded due to impact on NHL of the COVID-19 pandemic			

- This article is translated from the corresponding article of the Swedish Wikipedia, retrieved 20 February 2022.

== See also ==
- Kharlamov Trophy
