= Henrik Zetterberg =

Swedish ice hockey player (born 1980)

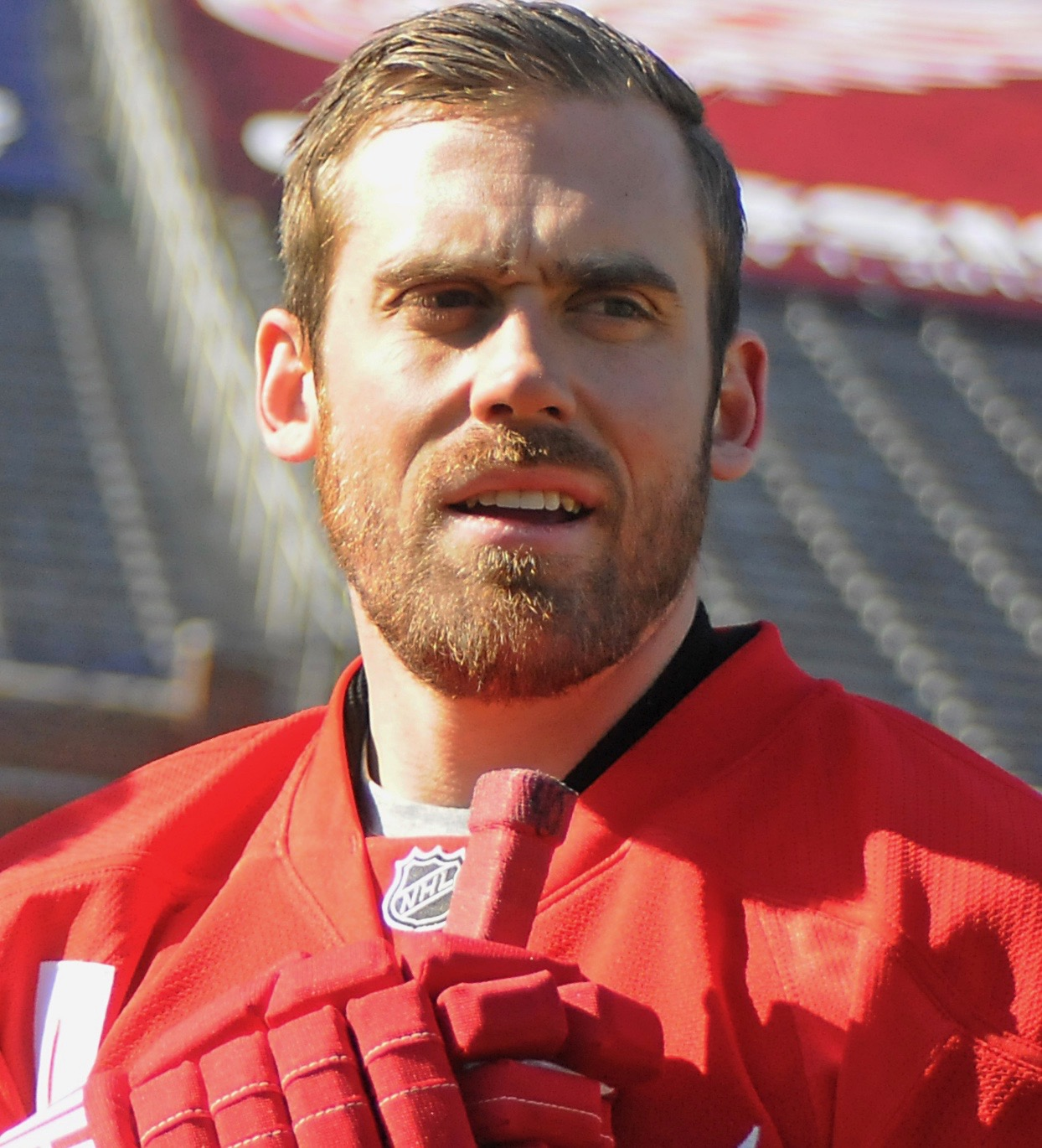
- Zetterberg with the Detroit Red Wings in 2012
- Born: 9 October 1980 (age 46) Njurunda, Sweden
- Height: 180 cm (5 ft 11 in)
- Weight: 88 kg (194 lb; 13 st 12 lb)
- Position: Centre
- Shot: Left
- Played for: Timrå IK; Detroit Red Wings; EV Zug
- National team: Sweden
- NHL draft: 210th overall, 1999; Detroit Red Wings
- Playing career: 1997–2018
- Website: Henrikzetterberg.com

Henrik Zetterberg (pronounced [ˈhɛ̌nːrɪk ˈsɛ̂tːɛrˌbærj]; born 9 October 1980) is a Swedish former professional ice hockey forward. He played his entire National Hockey League career, from 2002 to 2018, with the Detroit Red Wings of the National Hockey League.

Bursting onto the scene as a rookie in the 2002–03 NHL season, Zetterberg would finish second overall in votes for the Calder Memorial Trophy as the League's top rookie. Along with winning the Stanley Cup in 2008, Zetterberg won the Conn Smythe Trophy as the Most Valuable Player of the 2008 Stanley Cup playoffs. He won gold medals in the 2006 Ice Hockey World Championships and 2006 Winter Olympics, as part of the first team to ever win both tournaments in the same year, also making him a member of the Triple Gold Club.

== Playing career ==
=== Timrå IK ===
Zetterberg was born in Njurunda, Sundsvall Municipality. Zetterberg started his youth league career playing games for Njurunda SK, as did Fredrik Modin. In 2008, the club renamed their arena—until then known as Njurunda Ishall—to Modin & Zetterberg Hall in their honor. When Zetterberg was 15 years old he left Njurunda for Timrå IK. Zetterberg caught the attention of the Red Wings' Assistant General Manager Jim Nill and Director of European Scouting Håkan Andersson during a tournament in Finland. While Andersson was trying to point out Mattias Weinhandl, Nill could not help noticing "this little Zetterberg guy who always seemed to have the puck."

Zetterberg was selected by the Detroit Red Wings 210th overall in the seventh round of the 1999 NHL entry draft. Detroit was under criticism at the time for "mortgaging its future", trading away many of its earlier picks in the 1999 Draft. After playing for Timrå IK of the Swedish Elitserien for the 2000–01 and 2001–02 seasons, Zetterberg signed his entry-level contract on 16 May 2002. Zetterberg came to Detroit to play his rookie season in the NHL in the 2002–03 season.

=== Detroit Red Wings ===
==== Early career (2002–2006) ====
Zetterberg made his NHL debut against the San Jose Sharks on 10 October 2002, at the Joe Louis Arena. He played in 79 games his rookie season, scoring 22 goals and 22 assists for 44 points, leading all first-year players. Zetterberg finished the season as runner-up for the Calder Memorial Trophy as rookie of the year behind St. Louis Blues defenceman Barret Jackman.

In his second season, Zetterberg nearly matched his rookie stats despite missing 21 games due to a broken leg suffered against the Vancouver Canucks early in the season on 5 November 2003.

Due to the owners' lockout the next season, Zetterberg returned to Sweden to play for Timrå IK in 2004–05, leading the Elitserien in scoring with 50 points in 50 games.

As the NHL resumed in 2005–06, Zetterberg emerged as an NHL star and was also named an alternate captain in the absence of team captain Steve Yzerman. He enjoyed his second best statistical season in 2005–06, playing in 77 contests and tallying 39 goals and 46 assists for 85 points, second in team-scoring to Pavel Datsyuk in a lineup which included Zetterberg and teammates Tomas Holmström, Mikael Samuelsson, Nicklas Lidström, and Niklas Kronwall. The combination was dubbed the "Swedish Five", a concept similar to the famed Russian Five of the Red Wings during the 1990s. All five players would also skate together at the 2006 Winter Olympics, helping Sweden to a gold medal.

==== Back-to-back Stanley Cup Finals, Stanley Cup win, playoff MVP (2006–2012) ====
With the announced retirement of Steve Yzerman during the season, Swedish newspaper Aftonbladet speculated that Zetterberg might take over the captaincy for the Red Wings, but Lidström was instead named Yzerman's successor while Zetterberg was named an alternate on the day of the Red Wings' 2006–07 season opener. That season, Zetterberg was selected for the 2007 NHL All-Star Game, but withdrew to rest an injured wrist. Later in the year, Zetterberg scored his 100th career goal against the Phoenix Coyotes on 8 February 2007, prompting Coyotes head coach Wayne Gretzky to comment that Zetterberg is "probably the most underrated player in the league." Nine days later, on 17 February, in another game against the Coyotes, Zetterberg picked up his first career hat-trick, all power play goals, and added an assist on an empty-net goal by Jason Williams for a four-point game. He finished the season with 68 points in his injury-shortened 63-game season.

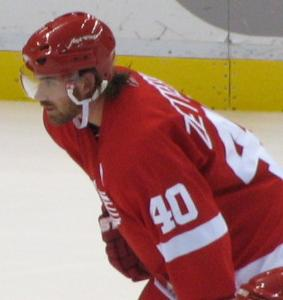
Zetterberg during a break in the action in October 2006

Zetterberg began the 2007–08 season with a 16-game point-scoring streak, breaking the record of 14 games set by former Red Wing Norm Ullman in 1960. He was voted to start for the Western Conference in the 2008 NHL All-Star Game alongside teammates Chris Osgood, Lidström, and Pavel Datsyuk, but again did not play in the game due to back problems. Despite missing time due to injury, Zetterberg recorded a career-year with personal bests of 43 goals, 49 assists and 92 points in 75 games. He went on to add another 27 points in 22 playoff games, leading the Red Wings to the 2008 Stanley Cup championship, their 11th in team history. In game six of the Stanley Cup Final against the Pittsburgh Penguins, Zetterberg scored the Stanley Cup-winning goal and was awarded the Conn Smythe Trophy as playoffs MVP by league commissioner Gary Bettman. His 13 playoff goals tied with teammate Johan Franzén for the Red Wings record for most in a single postseason. At the end of the season, Zetterberg was also up for the Frank J. Selke Trophy as the best defensive forward, but finished as a runner-up to Datsyuk.

In the final year of his contract in 2008–09, Zetterberg agreed to a 12-year, $73 million contract extension with the Red Wings on 28 January 2009. The deal is the longest and most lucrative in franchise history. Zetterberg recorded 11 goals and 13 assists for the Red Wings during the 2009 Stanley Cup playoffs that saw them reach game seven of the Stanley Cup Final, only to lose to their 2008 opponent the Pittsburgh Penguins.

Despite a slow start to the 2009–10 season, Zetterberg's play quickly improved, and he recorded the fourth hat trick of his career on 14 November against the Anaheim Ducks, scoring three goals in the third period of Detroit's 7–4 victory. On 17 December, in a 3–0 victory over the Tampa Bay Lightning, Zetterberg sustained a separated shoulder as a result from a hit from Lightning' defenceman Mattias Öhlund, causing him to miss the next eight games. He ended the season playing in 74 games with 23 goals and 47 assists for 70 points. He also scored seven goals during the 2010 Stanley Cup playoffs, which saw Detroit defeat the Phoenix Coyotes in the first round in seven games before bowing out in the conference semifinals against the San Jose Sharks in five games.

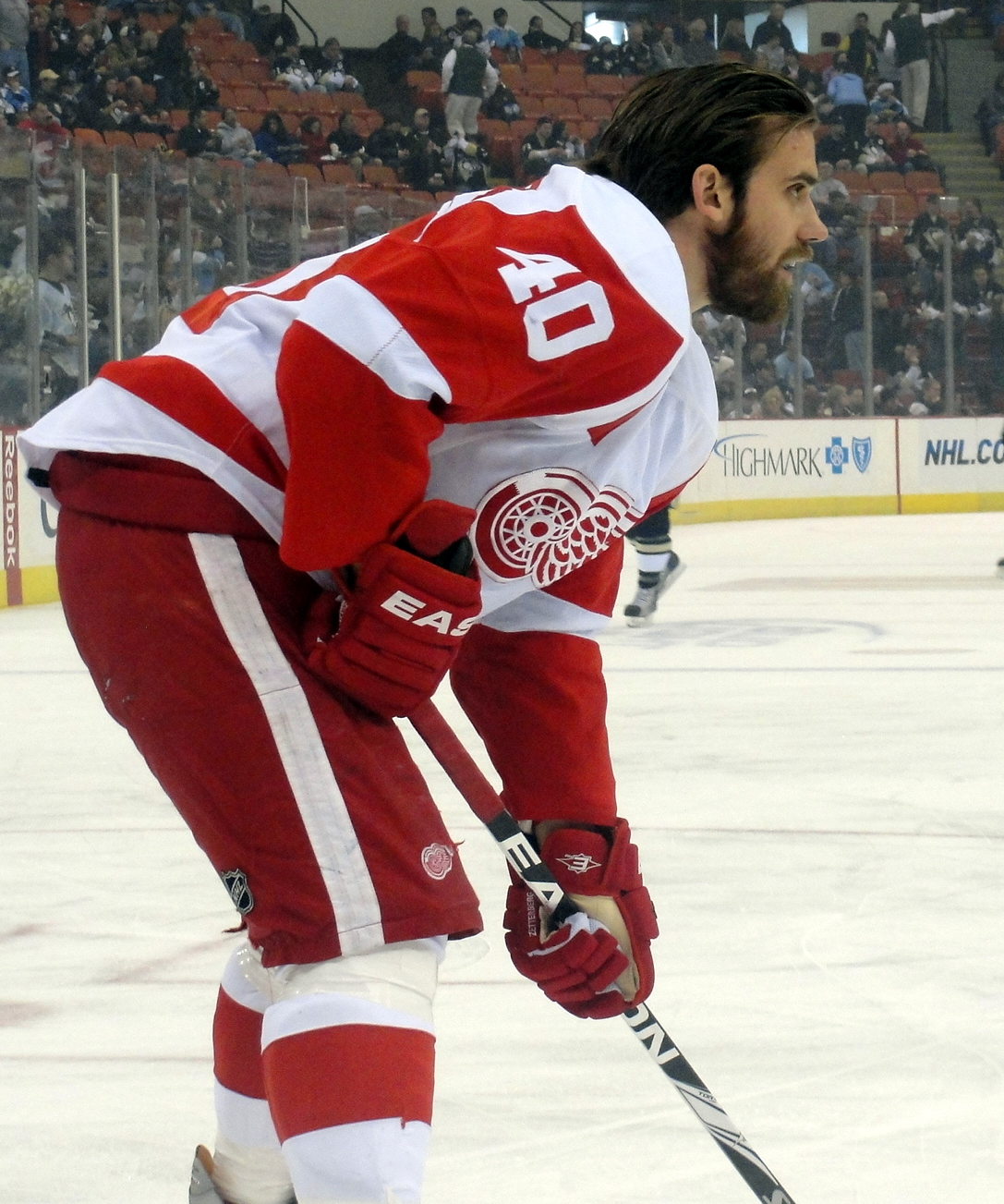
Zetterberg with the Red Wings in Pittsburgh, January 2010.

Zetterberg posted 80 points in 80 games in the 2010–11 season. However, the Red Wings again defeated the Coyotes in the opening round in a four game sweep then were eliminated by San Jose in the conference semifinals in seven games.

In the 2011–12 season, Zetterberg played on the second line alongside Valtteri Filppula and Jiří Hudler. Both teammates had career seasons playing on the line centered by Zetterberg. Filppula scored a career high 66 points while Hudler had a 50-point season (25 goals, 25 assists). The Red Wings fell 4–1 to the Nashville Predators in the conference quarterfinals, their earliest playoff exit since 2006.

==== Final years and captaincy (2012–2018) ====
Zetterberg signed with EV Zug in Switzerland during the 2012–13 NHL lockout.

On 15 January 2013, Zetterberg was named captain of the Red Wings, succeeding Lidström who had retired. Despite missing 13 games due to chronic back problems, he scored over 40 points through the first part of the 2013–14 season. However, he sustained another back injury during the 2014 Winter Olympics and underwent surgery, causing him to miss an estimated two months of the season while the Red Wings pursued a berth in the NHL playoffs for the 23rd straight year. Zetterberg returned for the final two games of the 2014 Stanley Cup playoffs as the Red Wings were eliminated in the Eastern Conference Quarterfinals by the Boston Bruins. He elected not to play for Sweden in the 2014 IIHF World Championship to further recuperate from his back injury.

On 6 November 2015, Zetterberg recorded his 300th career goal, which was against James Reimer of the Toronto Maple Leafs. He became the seventh Swedish player to reach the 300 goal plateau, and the fifth player in Red Wings franchise history to have 300 goals and 800 points, following Gordie Howe, Alex Delvecchio, Steve Yzerman, and Sergei Fedorov.

On 9 April 2017, he played his 1,000th game for the Red Wings organization, as well as became the seventh in franchise history in total points, the game was also the last at Joe Louis Arena.

During the 2017–18 season, Zetterberg reached several milestones. On 24 February 2018, he recorded his 335th career goal, tying him with Ted Lindsay for fifth all time in goals scored in franchise history. On 29 March 2018, he recorded his 954th career point, tying him with Sergei Fedorov for fifth all time in total points in franchise history.

On 14 September 2018, Red Wings general manager Ken Holland announced that due to a degenerative back condition, Zetterberg would be unable to continue with his NHL career. However, due to Zetterberg having had 3 years left on his contract at the time of the announcement, he did not officially retire until his contract expired following the 2020–21 season.

== International play ==
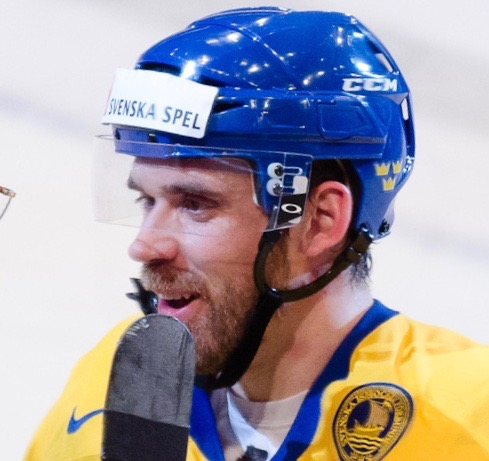
Zetterberg with Sweden at the 2012 IIHF World Championship.

Zetterberg has been a consistent part of the Swedish national team, "Tre Kronor", since 2001. He has enjoyed a fair amount of success in the IIHF World Championships, winning a medal in four of the five years he appeared in the tournament. He was one of just three non-NHLers named to the Swedish squad for the 2002 Winter Olympics in Salt Lake City, Utah.

Zetterberg won a gold medal at the 2006 Winter Olympics in Turin and then again at the 2006 IIHF World Championship in Riga, playing a part in the international sweep. Sweden became the first team in hockey history to win the Olympic gold and the World Championship in the same year.

With the 2008 Stanley Cup championship, Zetterberg became a member of the Triple Gold Club. The term is used for an exclusive group of ice hockey players who have won Olympic gold, World Championship gold, and the Stanley Cup. Zetterberg is one of 30 members of this exclusive club, a club that also includes several teammates and his long-time head coach. Zetterberg along with teammates and fellow Swedes Niklas Kronwall and Mikael Samuelsson are the fastest to accomplish this feat, requiring only two years, three months and ten days.

Zetterberg was named captain of Team Sweden for the 2014 Winter Olympics in Sochi. On-going troubles with a herniated disc in his back, which caused Zetterberg to miss 13 games with the Red Wings earlier in the season, forced Zetterberg out of the 2014 Winter Olympics after one game. Teammate Niklas Kronwall was named captain for the remainder of the tournament.

Zetterberg was named to Team Sweden for the 2016 World Cup of Hockey. On 11 August 2016, Zetterberg was named captain of the team. However, on 1 September, Zetterberg withdrew from the tournament due to a knee injury. He was replaced by Calgary Flames forward Mikael Backlund and Henrik Sedin was named the captain in his place.

== Personal life ==
Zetterberg goes by the nicknames of "Zäta" (pronounced "Zaeta," which means "Z" in Swedish) and "Hank," an anglicized shortening of Henrik that is used by his Red Wings teammates.

In the summer of 2008 he became engaged to Emma Andersson, a Swedish model and TV host. On 23 July 2010, Zetterberg married his fiancée near the bride's hometown in Mölle, Sweden.

On 20 August 2015, Andersson gave birth to their first child, a son named Love (pronounced Loo-VEY).

Zetterberg served several months in the Swedish Army when he was 17 years old—a rare thing among NHL players—as Sweden at that time had a conscription policy.

== In popular culture ==
In 2009, film-makers Greg DeLiso and Jakob Hawkins released a video series called "Fun With Henrik Zetterberg." The videos centre around a bumbling Henrik Zetterberg look-alike (played by Hawkins) and were positioned as spec commercial spots for the NHL and their affiliates. Although the spots were never picked up, the videos themselves went viral, garnering over 50,000 views in two days. The success of the videos spawned "Fake Henrik Zettererg," a twelve-episode web series authored by DeLiso and Hawkins. The series was launched on 26 October 2011 and has been featured on Yahoo Sports and The Huffington Post. The series featured Kevin Brown and Austin Pendleton.

== Career statistics ==
=== Regular season ===
Bold indicates led league

| | | | Regular season | | | | | Playoffs |
| Season | Team | League | GP | G | A | Pts | PIM | GP | G | A | Pts | PIM |
|---|---|---|---|---|---|---|---|---|---|---|---|---|
| 1997–98 | Timrå IK | SWE-2 | 16 | 1 | 2 | 3 | 4 | 4 | 0 | 1 | 1 | 0 |
| 1998–99 | Timrå IK | SWE-2 | 37 | 15 | 13 | 28 | 2 | 4 | 2 | 1 | 3 | 2 |
| 1999–00 | Timrå IK | SWE-2 | 42 | 20 | 14 | 34 | 20 | 10 | 10 | 4 | 14 | 4 |
| 2000–01 | Timrå IK | SEL | 47 | 15 | 31 | 46 | 24 | — | — | — | — | — |
| 2001–02 | Timrå IK | SEL | 48 | 10 | 22 | 32 | 20 | — | — | — | — | — |
| 2002–03 | Detroit Red Wings | NHL | 79 | 22 | 22 | 44 | 8 | 4 | 1 | 0 | 1 | 0 |
| 2003–04 | Detroit Red Wings | NHL | 61 | 15 | 28 | 43 | 14 | 12 | 2 | 2 | 4 | 4 |
| 2004–05 | Timrå IK | SEL | 50 | 19 | 31 | 50 | 24 | 7 | 6 | 2 | 8 | 2 |
| 2005–06 | Detroit Red Wings | NHL | 77 | 39 | 46 | 85 | 30 | 6 | 6 | 0 | 6 | 2 |
| 2006–07 | Detroit Red Wings | NHL | 63 | 33 | 35 | 68 | 36 | 18 | 6 | 8 | 14 | 12 |
| 2007–08 | Detroit Red Wings | NHL | 75 | 43 | 49 | 92 | 34 | 22 | **13** | 14 | **27** | 16 |
| 2008–09 | Detroit Red Wings | NHL | 77 | 31 | 42 | 73 | 36 | 23 | 11 | 13 | 24 | 13 |
| 2009–10 | Detroit Red Wings | NHL | 74 | 23 | 47 | 70 | 26 | 12 | 7 | 8 | 15 | 6 |
| 2010–11 | Detroit Red Wings | NHL | 80 | 24 | 56 | 80 | 40 | 7 | 3 | 5 | 8 | 2 |
| 2011–12 | Detroit Red Wings | NHL | 82 | 22 | 47 | 69 | 47 | 5 | 2 | 1 | 3 | 4 |
| 2012–13 | EV Zug | NLA | 23 | 16 | 16 | 32 | 20 | — | — | — | — | — |
| 2012–13 | Detroit Red Wings | NHL | 46 | 11 | 37 | 48 | 18 | 14 | 4 | 8 | 12 | 8 |
| 2013–14 | Detroit Red Wings | NHL | 45 | 16 | 32 | 48 | 20 | 2 | 1 | 1 | 2 | 0 |
| 2014–15 | Detroit Red Wings | NHL | 77 | 17 | 49 | 66 | 32 | 7 | 0 | 3 | 3 | 8 |
| 2015–16 | Detroit Red Wings | NHL | 82 | 13 | 37 | 50 | 24 | 5 | 1 | 0 | 1 | 4 |
| 2016–17 | Detroit Red Wings | NHL | 82 | 17 | 51 | 68 | 22 | — | — | — | — | — |
| 2017–18 | Detroit Red Wings | NHL | 82 | 11 | 45 | 56 | 14 | — | — | — | — | — |
| SEL totals | | | 145 | 44 | 84 | 128 | 68 | 7 | 6 | 2 | 8 | 2 |
| NHL totals | | | 1,082 | 337 | 623 | 960 | 401 | 137 | 57 | 63 | 120 | 79 |

=== International ===
Medal record

Representing Sweden

Ice hockey

Olympic Games
| Gold medal – first place | 2006 Turin | |
| Silver medal – second place | 2014 Sochi | |

World Championships
| Gold medal – first place | 2006 Latvia | |
| Silver medal – second place | 2003 Finland | |
| Bronze medal – third place | 2001 Germany | |
| Bronze medal – third place | 2002 Sweden | |

| Year | Team | Event | GP | G | A | Pts | PIM |
|---|---|---|---|---|---|---|---|
| 1998 | Sweden | EJC | 6 | 2 | 1 | 3 | 4 |
| 2000 | Sweden | WJC | 7 | 3 | 2 | 5 | 8 |
| 2001 | Sweden | WC | 9 | 1 | 3 | 4 | 2 |
| 2002 | Sweden | OLY | 4 | 0 | 1 | 1 | 0 |
| 2002 | Sweden | WC | 9 | 0 | 7 | 7 | 4 |
| 2003 | Sweden | WC | 9 | 3 | 4 | 7 | 2 |
| 2004 | Sweden | WCH | 4 | 1 | 1 | 2 | 4 |
| 2005 | Sweden | WC | 9 | 2 | 4 | 6 | 4 |
| 2006 | Sweden | OLY | 8 | 3 | 3 | 6 | 0 |
| 2006 | Sweden | WC | 8 | 2 | 3 | 5 | 6 |
| 2010 | Sweden | OLY | 4 | 1 | 0 | 1 | 2 |
| 2012 | Sweden | WC | 8 | 3 | 12 | 15 | 4 |
| 2014 | Sweden | OLY | 1 | 1 | 0 | 1 | 0 |
| Junior totals | | | 13 | 5 | 3 | 8 | 12 |
| Senior totals | | | 73 | 17 | 38 | 55 | 28 |

== Awards and achievements ==
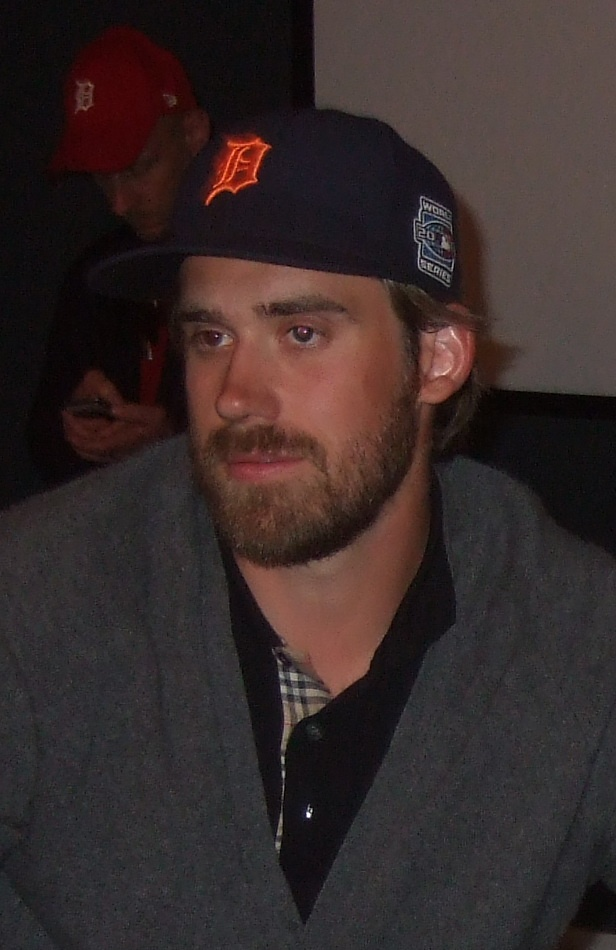
Zetterberg in 2008

=== Sweden ===
| Award | Year(s) awarded |
|---|---|
| Rookie of the Year | 2001 |
| All-Star team | 2002, 2005 |
| Guldpucken | 2002 |
| IIHF Hall of Fame | 2023 |

=== NHL ===
| Award | Year(s) awarded |
|---|---|
| All-Rookie Team | 2003 |
| All-Star Game | 2007, 2008* |
| Second All-Star team | 2008 |
| Conn Smythe Trophy | 2008 |
| Stanley Cup champion | 2008 |
| NHL Foundation Player Award | 2013 |
| King Clancy Memorial Trophy | 2015 |

* Could not play because of injury.

- Named "Detroit Red Wings Rookie of the Year" in 2003 by the Detroit Sports Broadcasters' Association for his play during the 2002–03 season
- Awarded the Sporting News Rookie of the Year (voted on by NHL players) in 2003
- Named "The Hockey News Player of the Month" for October 2007
- Viking Award in 2007 and 2008, awarded to the "Best Swede" playing in North America
- Named the first recipient of the 'TSN NHL Player of the Year' in 2008 by a panel of 30 people around the NHL
- Became a member of the Triple Gold Club with a Stanley Cup victory in 2008
- Named to the Class of 2023 of the Michigan Sports Hall of Fame

=== Records ===
- Holds a Red Wings record for having at least one point in 17 consecutive games to start a season.
- Holds the Red Wings franchise record for goals (13 – tied w/ Johan Franzén) and points (27) in a single playoff season.
- Holds NHL record for most shots on goal in single post season with 116 in 2007–08.

Awards and achievements
| Preceded by Mikael Renberg | Guldpucken award 2002 | Succeeded by Niklas Andersson |
| Preceded by Nicklas Lidström; Erik Karlsson | Winner of the Viking Award; 2007, 2008; 2013 | Succeeded by Nicklas Bäckström; Alexander Steen |
| Preceded by Scott Niedermayer | Winner of the Conn Smythe Trophy; 2008 | Succeeded by Evgeni Malkin |
Sporting positions
| Preceded by Nicklas Lidström | Detroit Red Wings captain 2013–2018 | Succeeded by Dylan Larkin |
