= Nick Polano =

Canadian ice hockey player, coach, and scout (1941–2019)

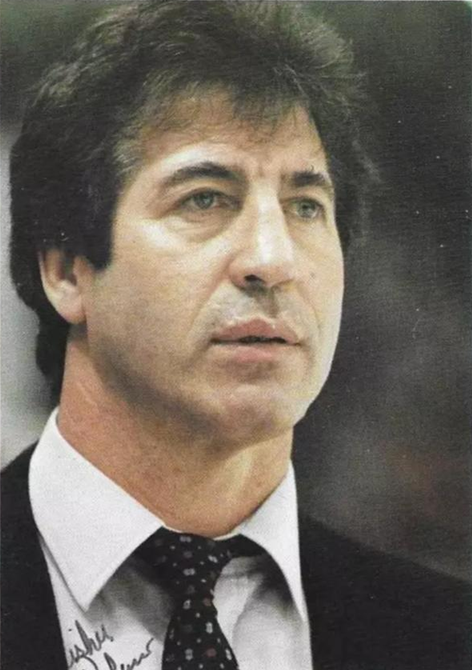
- Polano in 1984
- Born: March 25, 1941 Sudbury, Ontario, Canada
- Died: September 26, 2019 (aged 78) Northville, Michigan, U.S.
- Height: 6 ft 0 in (183 cm)
- Weight: 187 lb (85 kg; 13 st 5 lb)
- Position: Defence
- Shot: Left
- Played for: Philadelphia Blazers
- Playing career: 1959–1974

Nick Polano (March 25, 1941 – September 26, 2019) was a Canadian ice hockey player, coach, and scout. Polano was the Detroit Red Wings' head coach when owner Mike Ilitch first bought the team in 1982, and later served as the team's assistant general manager. As head coach, his overall record in the NHL was 79–127–34.

== Playing career ==
Polano was born in Sudbury, Ontario and grew up in Copper Cliff. He never played in the National Hockey League, but he did play 15 seasons in the American Hockey League (AHL), plus 17 games in the World Hockey Association (WHA) as a defenceman.

== Coaching career ==
Polano began his coaching career in 1975–76 with the Erie Blades of the North American Hockey League (NAHL) and led that team to three consecutive regular season and playoff championships. Staying with the Blades as they changed leagues, Polano was twice named Eastern Hockey League coach of the year and in 1981 was named minor league executive of the year by The Sporting News.

=== Detroit Red Wings ===
Polano served as an assistant coach with the Buffalo Sabres for one season under Scotty Bowman in the 1981–82 season.

Polano spent ten seasons in the Detroit Red Wings organization, first as head coach and then as assistant general manager. Polano guided the Red Wings from 1982 to 1985 and amassed a 79–127–34 regular season record as their head coach. Polano and team vice president Jim Lites, along with several European scouts, were instrumental in aiding the defection of several future NHL players from behind the Iron Curtain including Petr Klima, Slava Kozlov, and Sergei Fedorov.

Polano had scouted Klima during the 1983 World Championships where he was competing as a member of Czechoslovakia men's national ice hockey team. Based on Polano's recommendation, the Red Wings drafted Klima in the fifth round (88th overall) of the 1983 NHL entry draft. In the summer of 1985, Klima left his team during a team meal in Nußdorf am Inn, West Germany, to meet Lites and Polano at an undisclosed location. Several days were then spent in the effort to bring Klíma to North America as Lites and Polano kept Klíma under wraps in Nußdorf and other locations to avoid pursuit by Czech police. Polano stayed with Klíma as Lites and other Wings officials arranged for him to gain refugee status to enter the United States. While they were waiting, Polano trained Klima in the woods outside of town. The Red Wings were assisted by U.S. attorney general Edwin Meese and deputy attorney general Lowell Jensen in expediting the political-asylum process. Polano accompanied Klima to the United States, where they arrived at Detroit Metro Airport on September 22, 1985.

In the summer of 1985, Polano was replaced as head coach by Harry Neale, but remained in the organization as the assistant general manager for player development. The move had been planned by Red Wings general manager Jim Devellano several years prior.

=== Calgary Flames ===
From 1992 to 2000 Polano worked for the Calgary Flames, first as their director of pro scouting and later as their director of player personnel and general manager and alternate governor for the Saint John Flames.

=== Ottawa Senators ===
In August 2002, Polano joined the Ottawa Senators as part-time professional scout.

== Personal life ==
Polano had two children with his wife Elva, whom he was married to for 56 years. In 2015, he was diagnosed with Alzheimer's disease and was later put into memory care in Northville, Michigan. On September 26, 2019, Polano died at the age of 78.

== Career statistics ==
=== Regular season and playoffs ===
			Regular season					Playoffs
Season	Team	League	GP	G	A	Pts	PIM	GP	G	A	Pts	PIM
1958–59	Hamilton Tiger Cubs	OHA	54	1	8	9	0	—	—	—	—	—
1959–60	Louisville Rebels	IHL	35	0	14	14	102	6	0	1	1	10
1959–60	Hamilton Tiger Cubs	OHA	23	3	5	8	0	—	—	—	—	—
1960–61	Sudbury Wolves	EPHL	13	1	2	3	22	—	—	—	—	—
1960–61	Edmonton Flyers	WHL	28	0	7	7	70	—	—	—	—	—
1960–61	Omaha Knights	IHL	18	0	2	2	135	—	—	—	—	—
1961–62	Sudbury Wolves	EPHL	28	3	7	10	80	—	—	—	—	—
1961–62	Hershey Bears	AHL	37	2	2	4	76	—	—	—	—	—
1962–63	Syracuse/St. Louis Braves	EPHL	71	7	26	33	152	—	—	—	—	—
1962–63	Hershey Bears	AHL	––	––	––	––	––	1	0	0	0	4
1963–64	Hershey Bears	AHL	61	2	8	10	97	6	0	1	1	18
1964–65	Omaha Knights	CPHL	57	4	27	31	146	6	0	1	1	6
1965–66	Hershey Bears	AHL	66	5	23	28	117	3	0	2	2	6
1966–67	Baltimore Clippers	AHL	67	1	25	26	116	9	0	6	6	24
1967–68	Baltimore Clippers	AHL	70	2	23	25	123	—	—	—	—	—
1968–69	Baltimore Clippers	AHL	52	2	8	10	87	4	0	0	0	4
1968–69	Amarillo Wranglers	CHL	7	0	5	5	27	—	—	—	—	—
1969–70	Providence Reds	AHL	72	4	20	24	124	—	—	—	—	—
1970–71	Providence Reds	AHL	72	6	29	35	169	10	2	2	4	20
1971–72	Providence Reds	AHL	59	4	9	13	92	5	0	0	0	4
1972–73	Providence Reds	AHL	38	3	9	12	60	4	0	1	1	6
1972–73	Philadelphia Blazers	WHA	17	0	3	3	24	—	—	—	—	—
1973–74	Providence Reds	AHL	20	1	8	9	16	—	—	—	—	—
1973–74	Albuquerque Six–Guns	CHL	25	1	9	10	52	—	—	—	—	—
1973–74	Cape Cod Cubs	NAHL	19	1	5	6	16	8	0	1	1	2
WHA totals			17	0	3	3	24	—	—	—	—	—

== NHL coaching record ==
Team	Year	Regular season						Postseason			
Team	Year	G	W	L	T	Pts	Finish	W	L	Win %	Result
DET	1982–83	80	21	44	15	57	5th in Norris	–	–	–	Missed playoffs
DET	1983–84	80	31	42	7	69	3rd in Norris	1	3	.250	Lost in Division Semifinals (STL)
DET	1984–85	80	27	41	12	66	3rd in Norris	0	3	.000	Lost in Division Semifinals (CHI)
Total		240	79	127	34			1	6	.143	2 playoff appearances

Preceded by Billy Dea	Head coach of the Detroit Red Wings; 1982–85	Succeeded by Harry Neale
