= Frances Kai-Hwa Wang =

American journalist, artist, scholar

- Born: Frances Kai-Hwa Wang
- Writing career
- Genre: Poetry

Frances Kai-Hwa Wang is an American writer and educator based in Michigan and Hawai‘i.

She was a 2019 Knight Arts Challenge winner receiving $25,000 for her project "Beyond Vincent Chin: Legacies in Action and Art" addressing a key case in Asian American history and its impacts since his murder in 1982. The John S. and James L. Knight Foundation created the award as part of its efforts to foster "informed and engaged communities" which the foundation believes are "essential for a healthy democracy."

She is the author of the books "Imaginary Affairs-Postcards from an Imagined Life," "Where the Lava Meets the Sea," and "Dreams of Diaspora." Her poetry is featured extensively in international publications including Cha: An Asian Literary Journal, Kartika Review, Ricepaper, and Drunken Boat, in addition to part of the Smithsonian Asian Pacific American Center Indian American Heritage Project exhibition. She has written for NBC News Asian America, PRI Global Nation, IMDiversity.com, Asian American Village, the Ann Arbor Chronicle and Michigan History Magazine and her reporting has covered Asian American poets such as Bao Phi, Đỗ Nguyên Mai, Jenna Lê, Monica Sok, Janice Lobo Sapigao, and Khaty Xiong. Her writing has received over 24 awards and fellowships since 2006.

Her professional experience includes serving as the Executive Director of American Citizens for Justice and Asian Pacific American Chamber of Commerce. As a teacher she has focused on topics of Asian/ Pacific Islander American civil rights, history, film, and media at the University of Michigan. Wang also teaches creative writing at University of Hawaii Hilo and Washtenaw Community College.

== Awards and distinctions ==
- Knight Arts Challenge for "Beyond Vincent Chin: Legacies in Action and Art," 2019
- Asian American Journalists Association AAJA AARP Caregiving Essay Award, 2019
- Damon J. Keith Center for Civil Rights Detroit Equity Action Lab Race and Justice Reporting Initiative Fellow on Arts, 2019
- Marguerite Casey Foundation Equal Voice Journalism on Poverty Fellow, 2019
- 2nd Place Dwarf Star Award, Science Fiction and Fantasy Poetry Association, 2019
- Michigan Historical Society State History Award for Best Article in Michigan History Magazine, "Vincent Chin: A Catalyst for the Asian-American Civil Rights Movement," 2017
- Education Writers Assn. National Seminar fellowship, "A New Era for Education and the Press," Washington DC, 2017
- Education Writers Association and Poynter fellowship, “Separate -- And Still Unequal,” Poynter, 2017
- Columbia Univ Grad School of Journalism Dart Center for Journalism and Trauma Midwest Reporting Institute fellowship on Gun Violence, 2017
- Education Writers Association fellowship, "Doing More with Higher Ed Data," Univ of Penn School of Education, 2017
- Association of Opinion Journalists (AOJ) and Poynter Institute Minority Writers Seminar Fellowship, 2015
- Council for the Advancement of Science Writing Diversity Travel Fellowship, 2015
- National Association of Science Writers Diversity Fellowship, 2015
- University of Michigan Literature, Science and the Arts (LSA) Diversity Institute Fellow, 2015
- Kellogg Foundation sponsorship to attend and report on America Healing conference, 2015
- Rotary International reporting sponsorship to embed Rotaplast medical mission to Philippines, 2014
- Angry Asian Man Blog Angry Reader of the Week, 2010
- Community Media Workshop Making Media Connections Conf. Scholarship, Chicago, 2010, 2011
- Online News Association Training Fellowship, Ann Arbor, 2010
- New America Media Ethnic Media Expo & Awards Fellowship, Atlanta, 2009
- Michigan Chinese Women's Association Who's Who Awards, 2008
- Ann Arbor YMCA Best Original Essay, 2008
- Council of Asian Pacific Americans Best Original Essay, 2006
- University of Michigan Minority Merit Fellowship and Rackham Merit Fellowship, 1988-1991
