= Keith Gave =

American author and journalist

Keith Gave is an author and sportswriter.

In 1989, while working as a sports reporter for the Detroit Free Press, Gave secretly passed a message from the Detroit Red Wings to two Russian players, Sergei Fedorov and Vladimir Konstantinov, that the Wings had recently drafted. The two would eventually defect in order to play for the Wings, and were part of the Russian Five that led the Red Wings to two consecutive Stanley Cup wins in the 1990s. Gave later wrote a book about the Russian Five, and the book was also made into a documentary film in 2019.

== Early career ==
Before his sports journalism career, Gave worked as a Russian linguist for the National Security Agency for six years. He then spent 15 years covering hockey for the Detroit Free Press. His two careers put him in a unique position when Detroit Red Wings executive vice-president Jim Lites contacted him in July 1989, asking for his help in passing a secret message to two Soviet hockey players recently drafted by the Wings: Sergei Fedorov and Vladimir Konstantinov. Soviet players at the time were not allowed to leave their country to play in the NHL, and Gave was to be a go-between for the Wings at an exhibition game in Helsinki, letting the players know that the Wings wanted them to defect. This began a process that would eventually culminate in the Red Wings forming the Russian Five line.

While in Detroit, Gave also co-hosted a morning show called The Morning Battery with Butch Stearns on all-sports radio station WDFN-AM in Detroit from February 1995 until January 1996. Gave succeeded former Major League pitcher Lary Sorensen, who was the original co-host of the show which began in July 1994.

== Post-Detroit ==
Gave left Detroit for a time, working in Chicago for the Associated Press and then in Dallas for The Dallas Morning News. He also covered ice hockey at the 1998 Winter Olympics in Nagano, Japan.

== Return to Michigan ==
In 2001, Gave left sports writing to teach journalism and English at Kirtland Community College in Michigan. In 2008, he took a job at Washtenaw Community College, where he taught until 2014. In February 2016, he was named the new Sports Director of the Blarney Stone Broadcasting radio network, where he also wrote columns for the network's website.

== The Russian Five book and film ==
In 2018, Gave's first book, The Russian Five: A Story of Espionage, Defection, Bribery and Courage, was published. The book included an account of his role in first contacting Fedorov and Konstantinov in 1989, and described in detail the overall story of how the Red Wings eventually brought the five Russians together, culminating in Detroit's first Stanley Cup since 1955. A documentary film based on the book, also called The Russian Five, was released in 2019. Gave served as a producer and writer on the film.
