= Russian Five =

Group of Russian players on the Detroit Red Wings

The Russian Five was the nickname given to the unit of five Russian ice hockey players from the Soviet Union that played for the Detroit Red Wings of the National Hockey League in the 1990s. The five players were Sergei Fedorov, Vladimir Konstantinov, Slava Kozlov, Slava Fetisov, and Igor Larionov. Three of the players were drafted by the Red Wings in 1989 and 1990, and their defections from the Soviet Union were aided by the Wings. The last two were acquired via trades from the New Jersey Devils and San Jose Sharks. Red Wings coach Scotty Bowman played the five together as a unit at times from October 1995 to June 1997, but also mixed and matched them with other teammates.

The Russian Five were major contributors in the Red Wings' Stanley Cup-winning run of the 1996–97 NHL season. Six days after the Cup victory, Vladimir Konstantinov was critically injured in a car crash that ended his ice hockey career. His Red Wings teammates dedicated the following season to him, and achieved the goal of "winning it for Vladdie" with their second consecutive Stanley Cup win.

By 2003, the remaining four players had all either signed with new teams, been traded, or retired. The Russian Five left a lasting impact on the way ice hockey was played and taught in North America, and had contributed to a major change in how European players were viewed in the NHL.

== Background ==
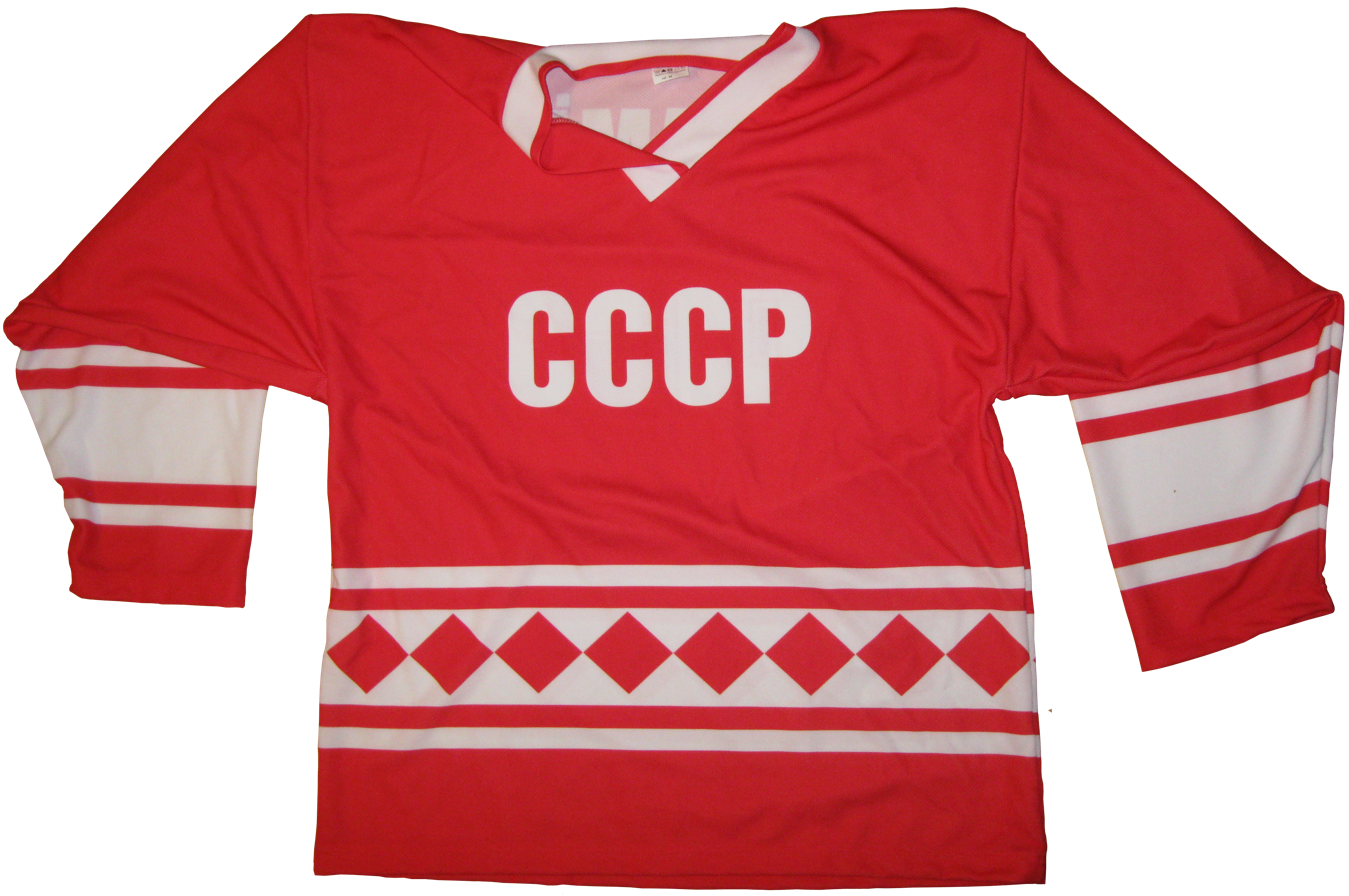
Soviet Union hockey jersey

During the Cold War, the best hockey players in the Soviet Union were not allowed to leave to play in the National Hockey League (NHL), despite their talents being on par with North American and Western European players. Before 1989, Victor Nechayev, who played three games for the Los Angeles Kings, was the only player from the USSR to play in the NHL. Sergei Pryakhin was given permission to play in the NHL in 1989 and played in 46 games through 1991. Neither player was considered a star in their native Russia.

In the fifth round of the 1988 NHL entry draft, the Buffalo Sabres selected Alexander Mogilny with the 89th overall pick. Mogilny had been called "the best 19-year-old player in the world" at the time. In May 1989, Mogilny became the first Russian player to defect from the Soviet Union in order to play in the NHL.

== Acquiring the Five ==
=== Fedorov and Konstantinov ===
In June 1989, Red Wings general manager Jim Devellano arrived at the NHL entry draft determined to "start drafting some Russians." Devellano had discussed the possibility of drafting Sergei Fedorov with Red Wings owner Mike Ilitch; while Fedorov was considered one of the top young players in the world, the risk factor was high, as there was no guarantee that he would ever be able to come to Detroit to play, even if he wanted to. Ilitch instructed Devellano to draft the best players available, no matter where they came from, and management would worry about delivering them.

Devellano consulted future Hall-of-Famer Steve Yzerman about Fedorov while the Red Wings captain was on an exercise bike in the Joe Louis Arena weight room. When he asked Yzerman for a scouting report, knowing that the two had played against each other in the World Championships, Yzerman simply replied, "He's better than me."

Devellano drafted Fedorov in the fourth round, higher than any Soviet player had ever been drafted before. Referring to NHL draft conventional wisdom that most elite players were gone after the first three rounds, he later said, "I used the theory, who are we gonna get here now in the fourth round from North America, really?" The Red Wings followed up that pick with the 11th-round selection of Fedorov's Soviet teammate Vladimir Konstantinov, an imposing two-way defenseman who was already known as one of the best blue-liners in the world.

Wings executive vice-president Jim Lites then contacted Detroit sportswriter Keith Gave about passing a secret message to Fedorov and Konstantinov from the Wings. Not only did Gave speak Russian, but his media credentials would enable him to get into an exhibition game in Helsinki where the Soviet national team was scheduled to play a Finnish elite-level club. Gave agreed to the mission, and in August 1989, he managed to meet with the players after their game and slip them each a Red Wings media guide with a letter hidden inside. The letters made it clear that the Red Wings wanted both of them in Detroit and were willing to help them get there.

By July 1990, Fedorov had decided to defect. The Soviet national team came to North America to play in the 1990 Goodwill Games, and had scheduled an exhibition match against USA Hockey in Portland's Memorial Coliseum on July 22, 1990. Jim Lites came to Portland, picked up Fedorov outside his hotel after the game, and brought him to Detroit in Ilitch's private jet.

Getting Konstantinov out of Russia would be more difficult, for two reasons. Unlike Fedorov, he had previously signed a 25-year contract committing himself to the army, and if he deserted, he would be considered a felon in Russia, which would make him ineligible for a work visa in the United States. He also had a wife and daughter, and would not consider leaving without them. Fedorov introduced Lites to his friend, a Russian journalist named Valery Matveev, who had moved to Detroit just after Fedorov's defection. Lites and Matveev worked together to secure an army discharge for Konstantinov. With cash provided by the Red Wings, Matveev bribed six Russian doctors to diagnose and confirm that Konstantinov was suffering from inoperable cancer, and thus secured his medical discharge from the military in the summer of 1991. The Red Wings were planning to fly Konstantinov and his family out from Russia and get him to Detroit in time for the start of training camp in September, but the 1991 Soviet coup d'état attempt forced a change in plans. With the airports closed, Matveev took the family by train to Budapest. Lites met them there, again in Ilitch's private jet, and went back to Detroit with Konstantinov aboard. His wife and daughter followed two days later on a commercial flight.

=== Vyacheslav "Slava" Kozlov ===
Jim Devellano had been impressed by Slava Kozlov when he saw him play at a youth tournament in Lake Placid, New York, in 1987, when Kozlov was just 15. He called the Ilitches and told them, "I've just seen the best 15-year-old hockey player I've ever seen in my lifetime – and I saw Wayne Gretzky play at that age." Devellano used his third round pick (45th overall) to draft Kozlov in the 1990 NHL entry draft, breaking his own record, set the previous year, for the highest draft pick of a Soviet player. He admitted later that this was a bigger risk, since in the third round, "You can get some North American players. It's not the fourth round, it's the third round."

In December 1990, a Red Wings contingent, including Lites and assistant GM Nick Polano, traveled to Regina, Saskatchewan, for the World Junior Championships, ready to bring Kozlov back to Detroit with them. However, Kozlov, just 19 at the time, was not ready to commit to defecting, and returned to the Soviet Union with the rest of his team. Polano met with Kozlov three more times over the next year. Then, in November 1991, Kozlov was seriously injured in a car crash that killed his passenger, teammate Kirill Tarasov. Polano traveled to Russia again and offered to take Kozlov to get medical care in Detroit. Valery Matveev bribed Russian doctors, much as he had in Konstantinov's case, but this time secured Kozlov's release from his Red Army enlistment with a diagnosis of permanent brain damage and loss of peripheral vision stemming from head injuries sustained in the crash. Kozlov traveled to Detroit in February 1992 and made his debut with the Wings on March 12.

=== Fetisov and Larionov ===
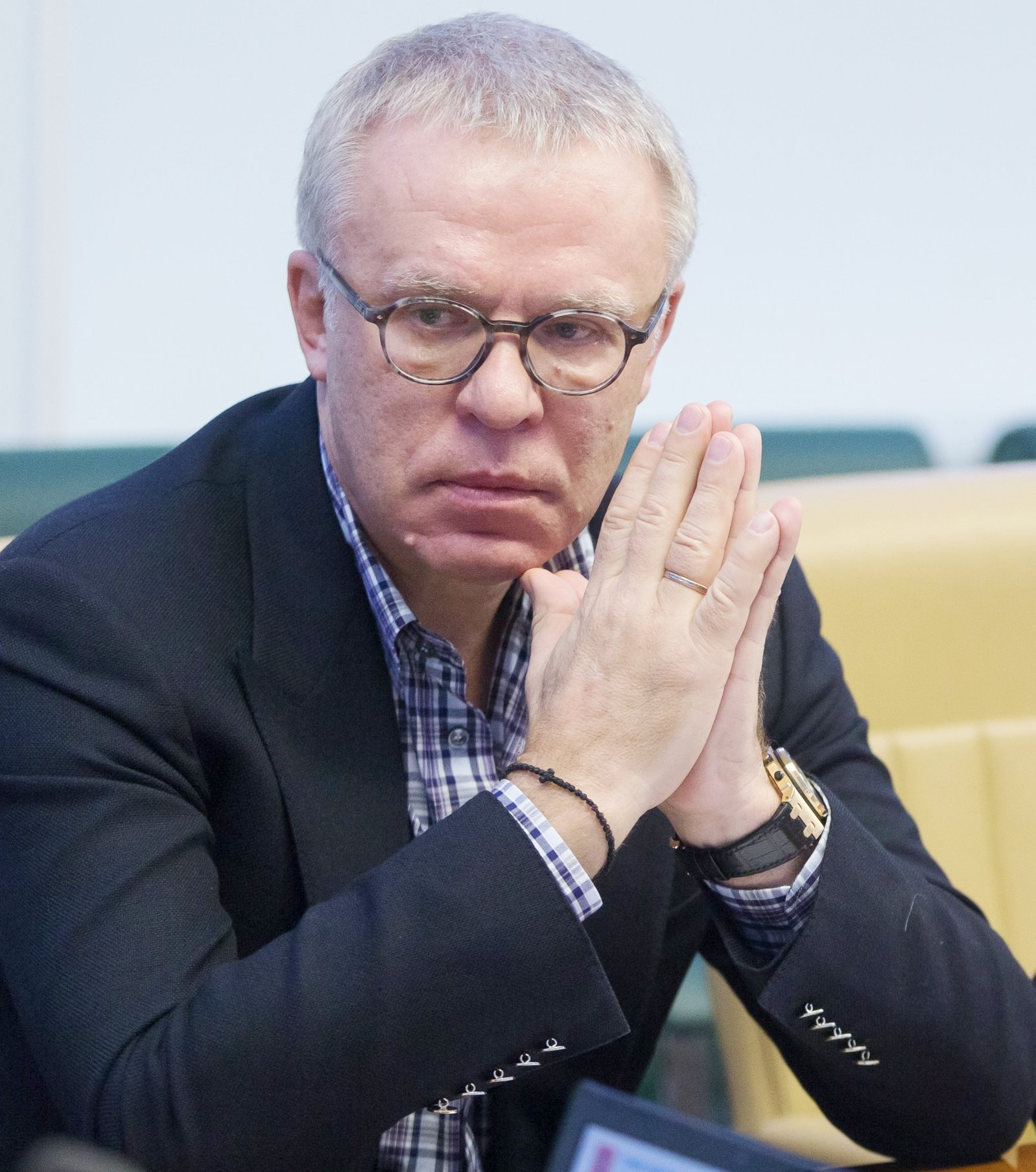
Fetisov in 2015

After Scotty Bowman was hired as the Red Wings coach in 1993, the Wings finished first in the Western Conference but lost to the San Jose Sharks in the first round of the 1994 playoffs. Bowman felt the team needed more help on defense, and he and assistant GM Ken Holland talked to Sergei Fedorov about Slava Fetisov, a CSKA Moscow veteran who was then playing with the New Jersey Devils. When Holland asked Fedorov his opinion on making a trade to acquire Fetisov, Fedorov replied, "Absolutely. It would be great for our team." On April 3, 1995, the Wings traded a future third-round draft pick to the Devils for Fetisov. He was 17 days short of turning 37. The Wings finished the lockout-shortened season with the best record in the NHL, but were swept in the Stanley Cup Final by Fetisov's former team, the Devils.

After that series, Fetisov began pushing Bowman to acquire Igor Larionov, another former Red Army teammate (and notable for being part of the KLM Line) then playing for the San Jose Sharks. Fetisov told Bowman if he could make a trade happen, "We would have five (Russians) then, and if you ever want to, you could play them together." Bowman convinced management to trade 50-goal scorer Ray Sheppard for the 34-year-old Larionov. Three days later, on October 27, 1995, Larionov joined his new team in Calgary to play against the Flames. A few minutes into the game, Bowman sent all five Russians over the boards together, and the Russian Five was born.

== The Five on the Red Wings ==
For much of the 1995–96 season, Bowman played the five Russians together as a unit. By that time, there were 55 Russians playing in the NHL. Only the Red Wings, however, had put together such a combination in starring roles on their team. At the end of the regular season, the five Russians had scored 117 of the Red Wings' 325 goals. The team won an NHL-record 62 games, but fell to the Colorado Avalanche in six games in the Western Conference Finals. Towards the end of the regular season, Bowman had begun mixing and matching the five Russians with other teammates at times.

In the 1997 playoffs, the Russian Five were a critical part of each series. In the first round against the St. Louis Blues, Larionov led the team with five assists. In a second-round sweep of the Anaheim Mighty Ducks, the top three Wings scorers were Fedorov, with five points, along with Konstantinov and Kozlov, with four points each. In a Western Conference finals rematch against the Avalanche, Fedorov led all scorers with three goals and four assists, while Larionov and Kozlov each had two goals and three assists. All three players contributed a game-winning goal during the series.

=== 1997 Stanley Cup Final ===
Detroit faced the Philadelphia Flyers in the 1997 Stanley Cup Final. Before the series, most hockey commentators believed that the Flyers' size and strength, led by MVP Eric Lindros, would be too much for the smaller Wings to handle, and the Flyers were favored to win the Stanley Cup. However, the Red Wings surprised most observers by being the more physical team, and one standout in that regard was Vladimir Konstantinov. Early in Game 1, he leveled Flyers winger Trent Klatt as he attempted to carry the puck into the Wings' end; Klatt lay on the ice for several seconds afterwards. In Game 3, Konstantinov delivered a hit on Dale Hawerchuk that led to a Red Wings goal 24 seconds later; Hawerchuk did not play in Game 4 and retired after the season. The Red Wings swept the Flyers and won their first Stanley Cup in 42 years.

Speaking about Konstantinov's effect in that series, Jimmy Devellano said "Vladdie certainly let the Flyers know that the Red Wings weren’t going to be pushed around... he just hit everything in sight." Bowman called him "a game-changer." Assistant coach Dave Lewis said, "When Vladimir Konstantinov hit Hawerchuk, it changed the game. It changed the series. It was over at that point." Teammate Kris Draper said it was "one of the hardest hits I’d ever seen."

At the conclusion of Game 4, the Stanley Cup was presented to the winning team's captain, Steve Yzerman, who hoisted it above his head and skated the traditional victory lap around Joe Louis Arena. He then handed the Cup to Slava Fetisov, the now-39-year-old former captain of the Red Army club. Fetisov immediately skated over to Igor Larionov and the two skated around the rink holding the cup aloft between them.

=== Limousine crash ===
Six days after the Stanley Cup win, most of the team gathered for a golf outing and dinner at The Orchards Golf Club in nearby Washington Township. Limousines were ordered so that no one partying would have to drive. Fetisov, Konstantinov, and team massage therapist Sergei Mnatsakanov left the party in a limousine driven by Richard Gnida, who had a suspended license after two convictions for drunk driving. The limo veered across three lanes of traffic, skipped the curb, and crashed into a tree. All four occupants were taken to nearby Beaumont Hospital; Fetisov suffered broken ribs and a punctured lung but made a full recovery. Mnatsakanov spent several weeks in a coma, and was permanently paralyzed from the waist down.

Konstantinov suffered severe head injuries and was in a coma even longer than Mnatsakanov. When he finally awoke, he was unable to speak, and needed months of rehabilitation before he could leave the hospital. His brain had been torn in several places, which disrupted his ability to communicate, destroyed his short-term memory, and made him unable to move with balance. His hockey career was over.

=== 1997–1998 season ===
Believe/Верим patch worn by the Red Wings in the 1997–98 season

The Red Wings players and coaches dedicated their efforts the following season to Konstantinov and Mnatsakanov. Kris Draper later said, "The motivation for us going into the Stanley Cup Finals in back-to-back years was definitely Vladdy. He was certainly in our hearts and in our minds and every time we played, he was that extra motivation that we need." Assistant coach Dave Lewis later said, "I don't think anybody could have beaten us that year, because we were so focused on winning it for Vladdie and Sergei Mnatsakanov."

In October 1997, Konstantinov's physical therapist decided that it was time to take him to Joe Louis Arena to see his teammates, and Konstantinov agreed with a thumbs-up. He was wheeled into the locker room a few minutes before practice ended, and the Red Wings arrived to see Konstantinov sitting in his stall with his jersey still hanging behind him. The players greeted him with hugs and handshakes. While Konstantinov spent most of the season in Florida undergoing physical therapy, he returned, along with his wife and daughter, to visit his teammates during the 1998 playoffs.

The Red Wings managed the rare feat of repeating as Stanley Cup Champions, sweeping the Washington Capitals in the Final. Konstantinov was brought onto the ice in his wheelchair for the team's victory celebration, and Yzerman, rather than taking the traditional lap around the rink that the captain would normally skate, immediately brought the Cup to Konstantinov and put it in his lap. As he held the Cup steady, Fetisov and Larionov pushed Konstantinov's wheelchair as the entire team skated their victory lap to a standing ovation.

=== After the Russian Five ===
Slava Fetisov retired after the 1998 Stanley Cup win. Slava Kozlov was traded to the Buffalo Sabres in the summer of 2001; he later played several seasons for the Atlanta Thrashers before finishing his career in the KHL. In 2000, Larionov, as a free agent, left to join the Florida Panthers, but was traded back to the Red Wings in December of that year. Fedorov and Larionov were with the Wings when they won their third Stanley Cup in 6 years in 2002.

Three of the five – Fetisov, Larionov, and Fedorov – were elected to the Hockey Hall of Fame after they retired.

== Legacy ==
The five players forever changed how North Americans viewed hockey players from Russia. Until the 1990s, there had been a perception that Europeans in general, and Russians in particular, were "soft", and that a team with too many of them would never be able to win a Stanley Cup. The Russian Five dispelled those myths forever, not only with two Cup wins but also because Konstantinov was one of the most feared hitters in the NHL. Steve Yzerman said of his former teammates, "The way they conducted themselves, the way they played for our team – that has changed the tone for European players in general."

Beyond how Russians were perceived, the five also changed how hockey was taught in North America, in no small part because of the value they placed on puck possession. In the words of Jim Lites, "Everybody used to dump the puck in and chase it down behind the net. The Russians changed that. They changed our game." Commenting on their puck control abilities, Red Wings goalie Mike Vernon once said, "There were times when I could have left the net and gone out for a pizza, and the other team still wouldn't have the puck from those guys when I got back."

In a 2020 interview, coach Scotty Bowman pointed out that the Russian Five brought a different style of breakout to the NHL, in which both forwards would leave the defensive zone while their defensemen still had the puck, and crisscross in the neutral zone. In his words, "that was a no in our game", but he stated that the Russian Five had an advantage because North American players had not seen that style before, and it eventually became integrated into the NHL.

Jim Devellano believed the Russian Five had an impact that went beyond hockey. "I grew up with all this propaganda about how the Russians were our enemy. Now here we were, bringing the enemy over here. Then they were so good – the last missing piece for us to win. And they became our friends. I think I learned something about propaganda and how it gets our minds working against different people." Sergei Fedorov agreed, saying, "We need to build more bridges than weapons. That’s my deep feeling about what should happen between our countries. Like we did in Detroit, you know?"
