= Washtenaw (disambiguation) =

The word Washtenaw is a variant of the Ojibwe word: "Wash-ten-ong," the Anishinaabemowin (Ojibwe) name for the Grand River in Michigan.

The name "Washtenaw" was originally applied to the first county west of Detroit, and has since been applied to:

- Washtenaw County, Michigan
- Washtenaw Avenue, a road in Ann Arbor, Michigan, Ypsilanti, Michigan, Harper Woods, Michigan, and Chicago, Illinois
- Washtenaw Community College, a community college in Ann Arbor, Michigan
