= Faith Towards Hockey Award =

- Sport: Ice hockey
- Awarded for: Kontinental Hockey League player who best exemplifies the qualities of perseverance, sportsmanship, and dedication to ice hockey.

History
- First award: 2000
- Most recent: Alexander Yeryomenko

The Faith Towards Hockey Award is awarded annually to the Kontinental Hockey League player who best exemplifies the qualities of perseverance, sportsmanship, and dedication to ice hockey. The award held by «Sozvezdie» fund and Russian Sportsmans' Union in 2000.

== Winners ==
Season	Winner	Team	Country
2000–01	Vladimir Tyurikov	Spartak Moscow	Russia
2001–02	Alexei Amelin	Lokomotiv Yaroslavl	Russia
2002–03	Alexander Semak	Dynamo Moscow	Russia
2003–04	Sergei Osipov	Metallurg Magnitogorsk	Russia
2004–05	Valeri Kamensky	Khimik Voskresensk	Russia
2005–06	Andrei Potaichuk	Khimik Moscow Oblast	Russia
2006–07	Albert Leshchyov	Khimik Moscow Oblast	Russia
2007–08	Albert Leshchyov	Khimik Moscow Oblast	Russia
2008–09	Oleg Petrov	Ak Bars Kazan	Russia
2009–10	Alexander Koreshkov	Barys Astana	Kazakhstan
2010–11	Sergei Fedorov	Metallurg Magnitogorsk	Russia
2011–12	Andrei Subbotin	Avtomobilist Yekaterinburg	Russia
2012–13	Maxim Sokolov	Neftekhimik Nizhnekamsk	Russia
2013–14	Alexei Kalyuzhny	Dinamo Minsk	Belarus
2014–15	Vyacheslav Kozlov	Atlant Moscow Oblast	Russia
2015–16	Konstantin Gorovikov	Dynamo Moscow	Russia
2016–17	Maxim Afinogenov	Vityaz Podolsk	Russia
2017–18	Pavel Datsyuk	SKA Saint Petersburg	Russia
2018–19	Alexander Popov	CSKA Moscow	Russia
2019–20	Alexander Semin	HC Vityaz	Russia
2020–21	Pavel Datsyuk	Avtomobilist Yekaterinburg	Russia
2021–22	Alexander Yeryomenko	Dynamo Moscow	Russia
