= Jim Devellano =

Canadian sports executive

- Born: January 18, 1943 (age 83); Toronto, Ontario, Canada
- Occupations: Senior Vice President of the Detroit Red Wings and Detroit Tigers, part-owner Saginaw Spirit
- Awards: Michigan Sports Hall of Fame (2006); Hockey Hall of Fame (2010)

James Devellano (born January 18, 1943) is a Canadian sports executive. He currently serves as the senior vice-president & alternate governor of the Detroit Red Wings National Hockey League (NHL) team and vice-president of the Detroit Tigers Major League Baseball (MLB) team. He is also part owner and alternate governor of the Saginaw Spirit.

During Devellano's time with the Red Wings, he played a large role in building the teams that eventually won multiple Stanley Cup Championships, including the drafting of Steve Yzerman and Nicklas Lidstrom as well as bringing the Russian Five together, three of whom he persuaded to defect from Russia in order to play for the Wings.

== Early career ==
Devellano is originally from the Toronto area, growing up in the Cabbagetown and Scarborough areas. In 1959, he dropped out of high school after failing grade 9 algebra, and found work in the Toronto garment district for 80 cents an hour. He also spent time coaching and playing hockey, and closely followed the Toronto Maple Leafs and Toronto Marlboros.

In the 1960s, Devellano was employed by the Canadian government as a claims adjuster. During his frequent business trips, Devellano watched as many major junior hockey games as he could, and eventually found a job with the St. Louis Blues, working on spec (essentially no guaranteed compensation) as an amateur scout for general manager Lynn Patrick and head scout Frank Mario. Devellano and Patrick had met in person during the 1967 NHL Expansion Draft in Montreal. One of the first players Devellano recommended, Gary Edwards, was drafted in the first round by the Blues in the 1968 NHL Draft. Also a part of the Blues organization at the time was Scotty Bowman, who was first an assistant coach and assistant general manager, and later head coach of the Blues.

== New York Islanders ==
In 1972 Devellano was hired by general manager Bill Torrey and head scout Ed Chadwick as an Eastern Canada scout for the expansion New York Islanders. In his first season, he scouted "no-brainer" number 1 overall pick Denis Potvin, whom the Islanders selected in the 1973 NHL Draft. Devellano also played a role in nominating Al Arbour, a former player in St. Louis, to be Islanders head coach. In 1974, Devellano was promoted to director of scouting, where he would be overseeing the Islanders drafts. He also served as general manager for the Islanders minor league affiliate, the Indianapolis Checkers of the Central Hockey League. In 1981, Devellano was named assistant general manager of the Islanders after Stanley Cup championships in 1980 and 1981. After winning the Stanley Cup again in 1982, Devellano invested his playoff bonus of $25,000 into Maple Leaf Gardens Limited.

Devellano received three Stanley Cup rings with the Islanders; two as scout (1980, 1981) and one as assistant general manager and director of scouting (1982). Some of the Islanders drafted during his tenure include Denis Potvin, Bryan Trottier, Mike Bossy, Clark Gillies, John Tonelli, Ken Morrow, and Brent Sutter.

== Detroit Red Wings ==
Devellano was hired as general manager for the Detroit Red Wings by new owner Mike Ilitch in the summer of 1982.

Devellano served as the general manager of the Detroit Red Wings from 1982–1990, and again from 1994-1997. He remained in the Red Wings front office as a vice president during Bryan Murray's tenure as GM from 1990-1994. During his second stint as GM, Devellano served alongside Red Wings head coach Scotty Bowman, who also held the title of director of player personnel.

Devellano was instrumental in bringing the Russian Five to the Red Wings. He drafted Sergei Fedorov, Vladimir Konstantinov, and Vyacheslav Kozlov while all three were still playing in Russia, and later played a role in helping them defect to the United States so that they could play in the NHL. He added Slava Fetisov in a trade with the New Jersey Devils in 1995, and then acquired Igor Larionov just after the start of the 1995-1996 season by trading Ray Sheppard to the San Jose Sharks. Detroit went on to win two consecutive Stanley Cups in 1997 and 1998, and won two more in 2002 and 2008.

After the Stanley Cup Championship 1997 season, Devellano was named senior vice president and alternate governor, Bowman remained as head coach, and assistant general manager Ken Holland was named general manager.

On September 22, 2012, the Red Wings were fined $250,000 by the NHL after Devellano made public comments about the 2012 NHL lockout during negotiations between the owners and the players' union. Owners and team officials had been warned that they would be fined if they made any such comments after the lockout began.

== Detroit Tigers ==
On June 7, 2001, Detroit Tigers owner Mike Ilitch reorganized the team's front office. He named Devellano Senior Vice President, and tasked him with providing advice and expertise to the Tigers' business and marketing operations. During Devellano's tenure, the Tigers won the American League Championship in 2006 and 2012.

== Later career ==
As of 2017, Devellano continues to serve as senior vice president and alternate governor for the Red Wings. He divides his time between Detroit, Toronto, and Sarasota, Florida.

In 2006, Devellano was named to the Michigan Sports Hall of Fame.

In 2008, Devellano co-authored his autobiography with sportswriter and radio personality Roger Lajoie titled The Road to Hockeytown: Jimmy Devellano's Forty Years in the NHL.

In 2009, Devellano earned the Lester Patrick Award for his outstanding service to the sport of hockey in the United States. Also in 2009, Devellano was named to the Board of the Directors of the Indianapolis Indians, the Triple A affiliate of the Pittsburgh Pirates in the International League. Devellano is a minority owner of the franchise.

Devellano was elected to the Hockey Hall of Fame on June 22, 2010. He was inducted November 8, 2010.

In August 2016, Devellano became a part-owner of the Ontario Hockey League's Saginaw Spirit. A few days later, former Red Wing goaltender Chris Osgood also joined the ownership group of the Saginaw, Michigan-based team.

== Legacy ==
In interviews and in his autobiography, Devellano recalled that the one player he tried to acquire on several occasions was Ray Bourque; and that he recommended Scotty Bowman and Al Arbour over Mike Keenan as candidates to be the Wings coach in 1993. He said his best trade was probably in 1996, acquiring Brendan Shanahan and Brian Glynn from the Hartford Whalers in exchange for Keith Primeau, Paul Coffey, and a 1997 first-round draft pick (Nikos Tselios). Another of his favorite trades was sending Kelly Kisio to the New York Rangers for goaltender Glen Hanlon.

Devellano admitted that his worst trade was sending Adam Oates and Paul MacLean to the St. Louis Blues after the 1988-89 season for Bernie Federko and Tony McKegney. Oates went on to play 19 seasons in the NHL and ranks sixth in all-time assists. Federko played one season in Detroit before retiring, and McKegney lasted only 14 games before he was traded.

Recollecting, Devellano called Islanders forward Mike Bossy "the best pure goal scorer" he had ever seen.

Devellano has been a part of 15 championship teams: seven Stanley Cup wins with the Islanders (1980, 1981, 1982), and Red Wings (1997, 1998, 2002, 2008); three American Hockey League Calder Cup wins with the Adirondack Red Wings (1986, 1989, 1992); two Central Hockey League Adams Cup wins with the Fort Worth Texans (1978) and Indianapolis Checkers (1982); one East Coast Hockey League Riley Cup win with the Toledo Storm (1994); and two American League Championship wins with the Detroit Tigers (2006, 2012).

Preceded by Jimmy Skinner	General Manager of the Detroit Red Wings; 1982–90	Succeeded by Bryan Murray
Preceded by Bryan Murray	General Manager of the Detroit Red Wings; 1994–97 with Scotty Bowman	Succeeded by Ken Holland
