= Washtenaw Technical Middle College =

High school in Washtenaw County, Michigan

Coordinates: 42°15′47.9″N 83°39′49.7″W

Location
- 4800 East Huron River Drive; Ann Arbor, Washtenaw, MI 48105-4800; United States

Information
- School type: State Public Charter
- Motto: Transforming Education, Transforming Lives
- Opened: August 1997
- School district: Washtenaw Technical Middle College
- Dean: Karl Covert
- Grades: 9-12
- Years offered: 5
- Gender: Co-ed
- Age: 13 to 19
- Enrolment: 754
- Average class size: 22
- Schedule type: Standard Periods schedule
- Campus: Washtenaw Community College
- Sports: Ultimate Frisbee
- Team name: Ouroboros
- Website: https://www.wccnet.edu/wtmc/

Student assessments
- 2021–22 school year Change vs. prior year

M-STEP 11th grade proficiency rates (Science / Social Studies)
- Advanced %: 32.1 / 14.6
- Proficient %: 25.8 / 42.0
- PR. Proficient %: 10.7 / 35.7
- Not Proficient %: 31.4 / 7.6

Average test scores
- SAT Total: 1112.7 (▼ −49.5)

Washtenaw Technical Middle College (WTMC) is a Michigan Public School Academy chartered by and located on the campus of Washtenaw Community College (WCC) near Ann Arbor, Michigan, United States. The school allows students to obtain an associate's degree or Technical Certificate from Washtenaw Community College while earning their high school diploma.

The mission of WTMC is "to transform high school students into successful college students by providing meaningful educational choices, individualized advising, and skill-based instruction."
