= Sergei Fedorov =

Russian ice hockey player (born 1969)

- Hockey Hall of Fame, 2015
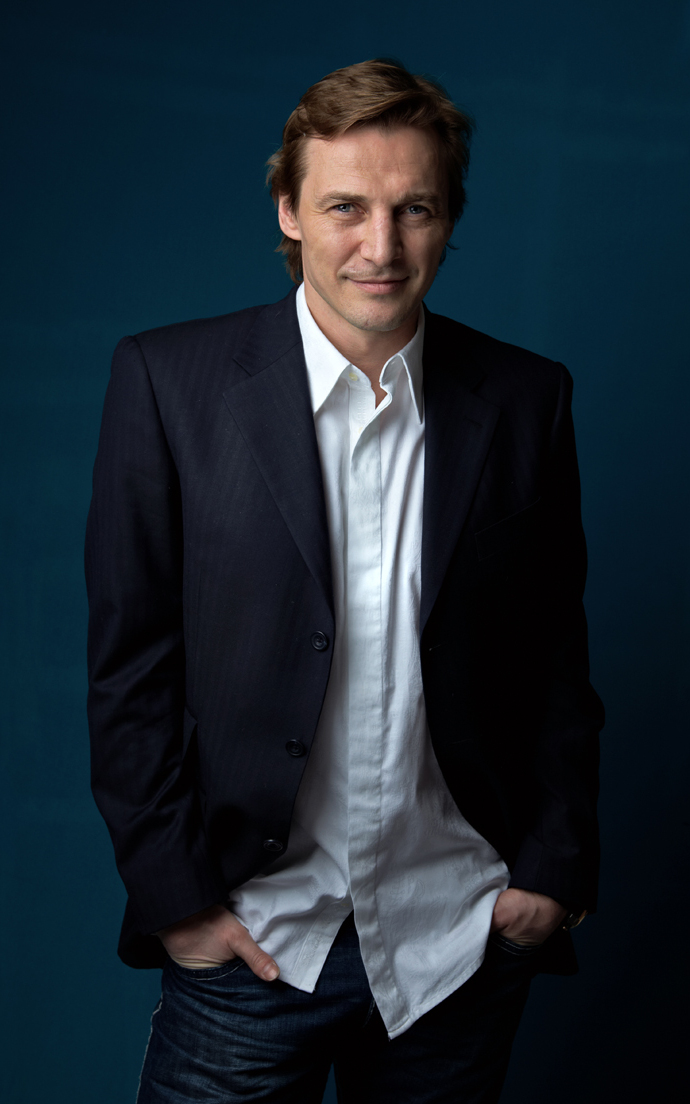
- Fedorov in 2010
- Born: December 13, 1969 (age 56) Pskov, Russian SFSR, Soviet Union
- Height: 6 ft 2 in (188 cm)
- Weight: 207 lb (94 kg; 14 st 11 lb)
- Position: Centre / Defence
- Shot: Left
- Played for: CSKA Moscow; Detroit Red Wings; Mighty Ducks of Anaheim; Columbus Blue Jackets; Washington Capitals; Metallurg Magnitogorsk
- Coached for: CSKA Moscow
- National team: Soviet Union and Russia
- NHL draft: 74th overall, 1989; Detroit Red Wings
- Playing career: 1986–2012
- Coaching career: 2021–2024
Medal record
Men's ice hockey
Representing Soviet Union
World Championships
Gold medal – first place	1989 Sweden
Gold medal – first place	1990 Switzerland
World Junior Championship
Gold medal – first place	1989 USA
Silver medal – second place	1988 Soviet Union
Goodwill Games
Gold medal – first place	1990 USA
Representing Russia
Olympic Games
Silver medal – second place	1998 Nagano
Bronze medal – third place	2002 Salt Lake City
World Championships
Gold medal – first place	2008 Canada
Silver medal – second place	2010 Germany

Sergei Viktorovich Fyodorov (Серге́й Викторович Фёдоров; born December 13, 1969) is a Russian former professional ice hockey player and the former head coach of CSKA Moscow of the Kontinental Hockey League (KHL) from 2021 to 2024. During his playing career, for which he is best known for his 13 seasons with the Detroit Red Wings, Fedorov was primarily a centre, but occasionally played as a winger or defenceman.

Fedorov was one of the first hockey players to defect from his native Soviet Union in order to play in the National Hockey League (NHL). While playing with Detroit, he won the Stanley Cup three times, as well as the Hart Memorial Trophy as the NHL's most valuable player in 1994. After leaving the Red Wings in the summer of 2003, Fedorov played stints with the Mighty Ducks of Anaheim, Columbus Blue Jackets, and Washington Capitals before retiring from the NHL in 2009. He played in over 1,200 NHL games and scored 483 goals in the NHL. He is a three-time Olympian, the first European-trained player to win the Hart Trophy and is considered to be one of the best playoff performers in NHL history. In 2017, Fedorov was named one of the "100 Greatest NHL Players" in history.

Fedorov was considered one of the best players in the world from the 1990s to the early 2000s. He last played for Metallurg Magnitogorsk of the KHL, where he was made captain in early September 2011. He was also an ambassador for Russia at the 2014 Winter Olympics in Sochi. Fedorov was inducted into the Hockey Hall of Fame on November 9, 2015, and to the International Ice Hockey Federation Hall of Fame in 2016.

On August 19, 2025, the Red Wings announced that they would retire Fedorov's no. 91 jersey on January 12, 2026. Fedorov is the 9th Red Wing to have their jersey retired by the team.

== Playing career ==
=== Defection and career with the Red Wings ===
When he was just 16, Fedorov was already playing for CSKA Moscow in the Soviet Union with future Hockey Hall-of-Famers Pavel Bure and Alexander Mogilny, among others. In 1989, Mogilny became the first Soviet superstar to defect in order to play in the NHL. Less than two months later, Fedorov was drafted by the Detroit Red Wings in the fourth round, 74th overall, of the 1989 NHL entry draft. Red Wings general manager Jim Devellano had consulted team captain and future Hall-of-Famer Steve Yzerman about Fedorov, knowing that the two had played against each other in the World Championships. Yzerman told Devellano, "He's better than me."

Detroit sportswriter Keith Gave was asked by Wings executive vice-president Jim Lites to pass a secret message to Fedorov at an exhibition game in Helsinki where the Soviet national team was scheduled to play a Finnish club. Gave agreed to the mission, and in August 1989, managed to meet with Fedorov and teammate Vladimir Konstantinov, whom the Wings had also drafted, and slip them each a Red Wings media guide with a letter hidden inside. The letters made it clear that the Red Wings wanted both of them in Detroit and were willing to help them get there.

By July 1990, Fedorov had decided to defect. The Soviet national team came to North America to play in the 1990 Goodwill Games, and had scheduled an exhibition match in Portland's Memorial Coliseum on July 22, 1990. Jim Lites came to Portland, picked up Fedorov outside his hotel after the game, and brought him to Detroit in Red Wings owner Mike Ilitch's private jet.

Fedorov was described as "three great players in one". In his career, he "once held claim to the title of top player on the planet". Former Red Wings captain Steve Yzerman said Fedorov was the "best skater I've ever seen". During the 1993–94 season, Fedorov's outstanding play earned him the "oldest and most prestigious individual award in hockey", the Hart Memorial Trophy (awarded to the NHL's most valuable player), the Frank J. Selke Trophy (top defensive forward) and the Lester B. Pearson Award (awarded to the most outstanding player as selected by NHL players). He finished second in scoring behind the Los Angeles Kings' Wayne Gretzky with 56 goals and 120 points.

During the 1993–94 season, being interviewed before his game, Gretzky was talking about a December 17 game between the Red Wings and New York Rangers, saying, "[H]e had never seen a player dominate the game the way Sergei did." Later in the season, Gretzky also commented that he thought Fedorov was "the best player in the game at this point." Fedorov was introduced to Gretzky by Paul Coffey during the 1994 NHL All-Star Game, which led to him staying over at his Los Angeles home with his family for two weeks that year.

Playing in his second game after coming back from an injury, Steve Yzerman was asked about Fedorov's play during the season: "I've only seen two other players that can dominate a game like Sergei, and that's Wayne and Mario ... In my opinion, he's the best player in the League. He is different than Wayne and Mario because he dominates with his speed, and unbelievable one-on-one moves." Red Wings head coach Scotty Bowman was also asked in an interview during the season where he thought Fedorov ranked among the players and teams he has coached in his career: "He's right at the top. He's got the greatest leg strength I've seen in a player. His legs are phenomenal."

In the lockout-shortened 1994–95 season, Fedorov finished second on the Red Wings in points with 50 (20 goals and 30 assists) in 42 games. That season, in a game against Los Angeles on February 12, Fedorov scored all four of Detroit's goals in a 4–4 tie. Although the Red Wings lost the Stanley Cup Final that year to the New Jersey Devils, Fedorov led the playoffs in all scoring with 24 points (seven goals and 17 assists). He also led the Stanley Cup Finals in goals and led the Red Wings in points.

Fedorov won another Selke Trophy in 1996 after scoring 39 goals and 107 points in 78 games, while playing stellar defensively. He finished in the top five for Hart Trophy voting and led Detroit in scoring, and helped them win the Presidents' Trophy. That season, Detroit set an NHL record for wins in a season with 62. He also signed a four-year deal that season to become the first non-North American spokesman for Nike, in which he made the "white skates" famous. The skates were different due to their unique colours and design, and he promoted it through a series of commercials for Nike. Yzerman, speaking to a reporter on Fedorov a few weeks after turning the tide on a January 30 game that season that ended in a 4–2 victory for the Red Wings over the Toronto Maple Leafs, said, "Sergei is a game-breaker for us anytime he's on the ice ... He's the most talented player I've ever seen." The Red Wings' season ended in disappointment when they were defeated by the Colorado Avalanche in the Western Conference Finals, four games to two. Fedorov finished tied for the team lead with 20 points in 19 playoff games.

In the 1996–97 season, Fedorov played before the preseason started in August and September for Russia at the 1996 World Cup of Hockey. Later in the NHL season, he was a member of the Red Wings' first Stanley Cup championship team since 1955, leading the team playoff scoring with 20 points in 20 games, including 8 goals. He led the 1997 Stanley Cup Final in points and in goals for a second time. Goaltender Mike Vernon won the Conn Smythe Trophy, "but many hockey insiders believe that Sergei deserved that honor". During the regular season, Fedorov had achieved the rare feat of scoring five goals in a single game, as he registered all of Detroit's goals in a 5–4 overtime win against the Washington Capitals on December 26, 1996. It was also the first time in NHL history that a player completed a quintet of goals in overtime, a feat since equaled only by the Rangers' Mika Zibanejad on March 5, 2020, also against the Capitals.

In the mid-1990s, Fedorov became part of the Red Wings' Russian Five, together with Igor Larionov at center, Slava Kozlov at left, and Slava Fetisov and Vladimir Konstantinov on defense. The Wings won the Stanley Cup in 1997 and 1998.

After a lengthy holdout to start the 1997–98 season, Fedorov, a restricted free agent, signed an offer sheet with the Carolina Hurricanes worth up to $38 million, including bonuses. The Red Wings matched the offer on February 26, 1998, ending Fedorov's holdout. The offer included $14 million for signing and $2 million for 21 regular-season games. However, the most controversial part of the contract was a $12 million bonus payable immediately if Fedorov's team reached the 1998 conference finals—at the time, Detroit was already a Stanley Cup contender while Carolina was almost certain to miss the playoffs, so the clause was criticized for creating an unfair disadvantage for Detroit. Nevertheless, the Red Wings matched the offer and paid the bonus. The $28 million Detroit paid Fedorov for 43 total games in 1997–98 remains the largest single-season amount paid to an NHL player. Fedorov led the playoffs in goals and helped the Red Wings win their second consecutive Stanley Cup.

On February 14, 1999, Fedorov announced his entire base salary for the 1998–99 season—$2 million—would be used to create the Sergei Fedorov Foundation, a charity to assist Detroit-area children. During the 1990s, Fedorov was third in playoff scoring with 126 points, behind only Mark Messier (126) and Mario Lemieux (136). Fedorov is only the third player in NHL history to have four consecutive 20+ point playoffs, along with Mike Bossy and Bryan Trottier. He also led the NHL in plus-minus in the 1990s with a +221.

In 2001–02 season, Fedorov played with a star-studded roster that included newcomers Dominik Hašek, Luc Robitaille and Brett Hull, culminating with Fedorov winning his third Stanley Cup, where he led the Stanley Cup Finals again in points for a second time. During an interview with Hull days after the Red Wings' 2002 Stanley Cup championship win, he commented on Fedorov as a player and person: "[Fedorov's] maturity—not only on the ice, but off the ice—has grown immensely, and, like Stevie said, there's not too many guys in this league, if any, that have the skill that he does. And he's learned to use it over the years. I think everyone can see that." In the 2002–03 season, Yzerman was injured for most of the season, and Fedorov led the team in scoring with 36 goals and 83 points in 80 games, also winning the inaugural Kharlamov Trophy, at the time awarded yearly to the top Russian player in the NHL.

At the 2002 NHL All-Star Game SuperSkills Competition, Fedorov slapped the puck 101.5 mph (163.3 km/h) in the net to win "Hardest Shot". Hašek later remarked of Fedorov's shot, "I know his shot, and I'm not surprised that he won it ... He can shoot from the blue line and he can score from the blue line." After an October 25, 2002, game between the Pittsburgh Penguins and Detroit, talking to reporters about Fedorov, Mario Lemieux said, "He was awesome. The way he skates, he's just dominating out there. Especially in the neutral zone, he picks up a lot of speed. You can't defend against that."

Fedorov signed a free-agent contract with the Mighty Ducks of Anaheim for less than the Red Wings offered him after Detroit lost to Anaheim in the first round of the playoffs in 2003.

=== Mighty Ducks of Anaheim ===
In the 2003 off-season, Fedorov signed with the Mighty Ducks of Anaheim after a long contract dispute with the Red Wings in which he rejected five-year, $50 million and four-year, $40 million contract offers. On December 3, 2003, Fedorov returned to Detroit for the first time since signing with the Ducks; he was booed heavily by Detroit fans every time he touched the puck in an eventual 7–2 Red Wings victory, during which he scored one of Anaheim's goals. He remained with Anaheim from 2003 to 2005. It was with the Ducks that Fedorov registered his 1,000th point in the NHL, becoming the first Russian-born and sixth European-born player to do so.

Some hockey legends in interviews throughout the years have commented on Fedorov's abilities, such as former Red Wings teammate Nicklas Lidström: "I think he's the best player in the League. He's real tough to defend against. He's got quickness to best you if you step up to him. It's tough to stop him." Former Boston Bruins legend Ray Bourque once said, "Sergei is a dominating player, a franchise player. When he makes a move on you, he has the ability to maintain his speed or even go faster. There aren't many defensemen who can keep up with him." Steve Yzerman and Wayne Gretzky speaking to Fox Sports columnist and Detroit radio host Art Regner in past interviews said they thought "Fedorov is the most talented player they've ever seen."

Brian Burke, who had just joined the Mighty Ducks as general manager, found that Fedorov was less interested in contributing to the team, as he had with the Red Wings, than he was enjoying the nightlife in Los Angeles where he would be riding back in limos at 3 to 4am even on game days. Burke was so concerned that Fedorov 'was a bad influence in the dressing room,' and that 'other players were starting to follow his lead,' that he sent rookies Ryan Getzlaf and Corey Perry to the Ducks' AHL minor league team solely to get them away from Fedorov.

After leaving the Red Wings (his first season with Anaheim, in which he scored 31 times), Fedorov had multiple injuries and his tally of 18 goals in 2006–07 was the most he scored until his retirement from the NHL in 2008–09.

=== Columbus Blue Jackets ===
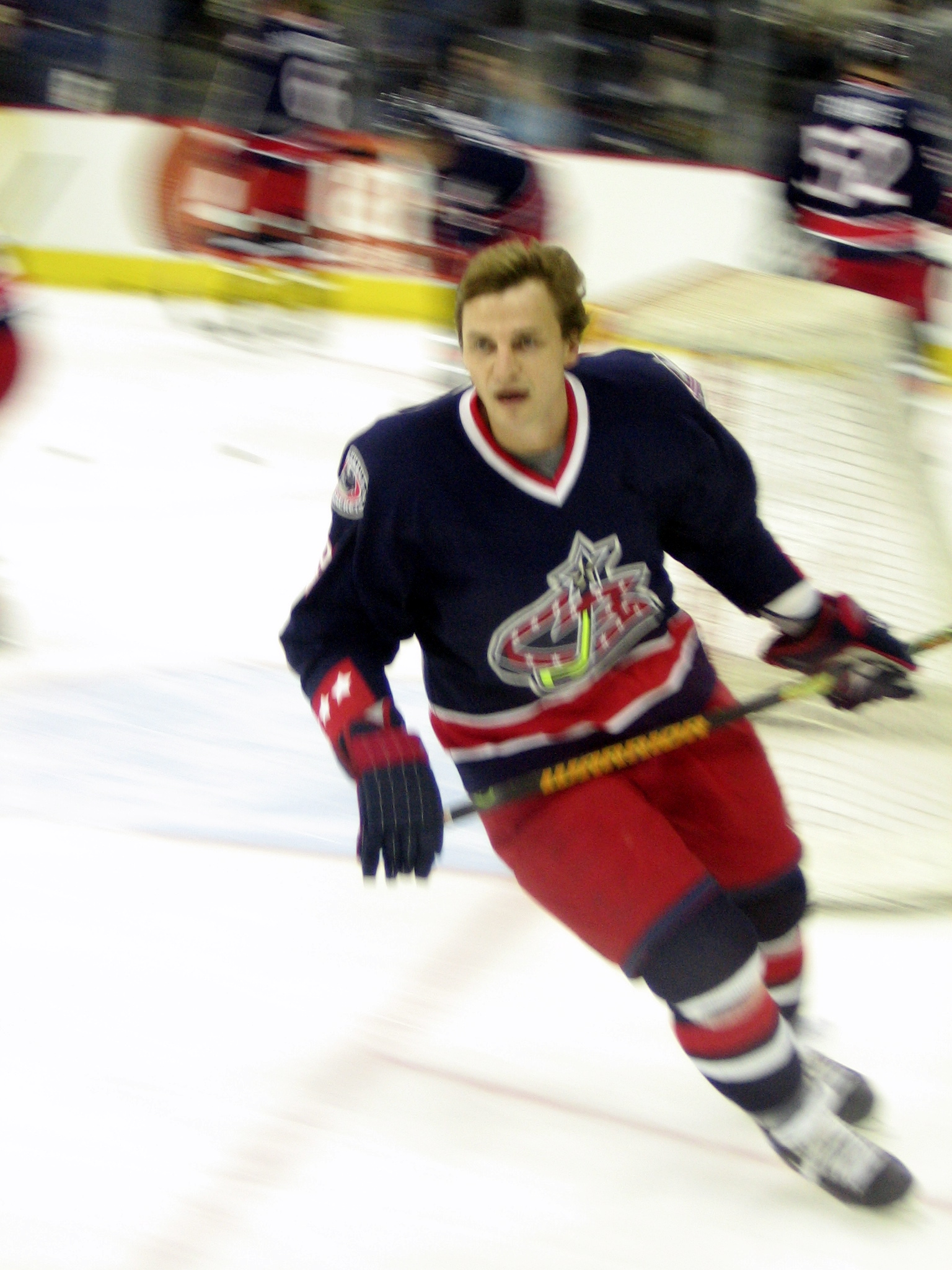
Fedorov with the Blue Jackets in 2006.

In an unanticipated move, on November 15, 2005, Fedorov (along with a fifth-round draft pick) was traded to the Columbus Blue Jackets in exchange for forward Tyler Wright and rookie defenceman François Beauchemin. As a Blue Jacket, Fedorov played his 1,000th NHL game on November 30, 2005, becoming the 13th European-born player to reach 1,000 NHL games and the 205th player overall to do so.

In a 2006 interview, former Detroit Red Wings head coach Scotty Bowman said, "[Fedorov was] one of my favorite players as a coach because he can do anything [asked of him on ice]." Bowman coached nine of Fedorov's 13 seasons with Detroit. During the late 1990s, Bowman experimented by using Fedorov on defense and pairing him with Larry Murphy. Red Wings Senior Vice-president Jim Devellano said, "I'm convinced if we left him there, he'd have won a Norris Trophy." Although he was effective playing defense, Fedorov stated he would rather play as a forward, though this did not prevent then-Blue Jackets head coach Ken Hitchcock from moving Fedorov to defense on occasion.

=== Washington Capitals ===
Approaching the NHL trade deadline in 2008, Fedorov was traded to the Washington Capitals in exchange for prospect Theo Ruth.

The following summer, Fedorov signed a one-year, $4 million contract with Washington. In 2008–09, what would become his final season in the NHL, Fedorov passed Alexander Mogilny for most goals scored by a Russian-born hockey player, a record that stood at 473 goals.

In a 2009 interview, Scotty Bowman recalled a conversation between Wayne Gretzky and himself: "I talked to Wayne Gretzky about that six or seven years ago and he said to me: 'I couldn't play forward and defence. Mario couldn't do it. Jagr couldn't play defence. But Sergei could. He was a hell of a player.'" A few years later, in a 2015 interview, Bowman stated he thought Fedorov "could have been an all-star defenceman, but he developed his offensive skills".

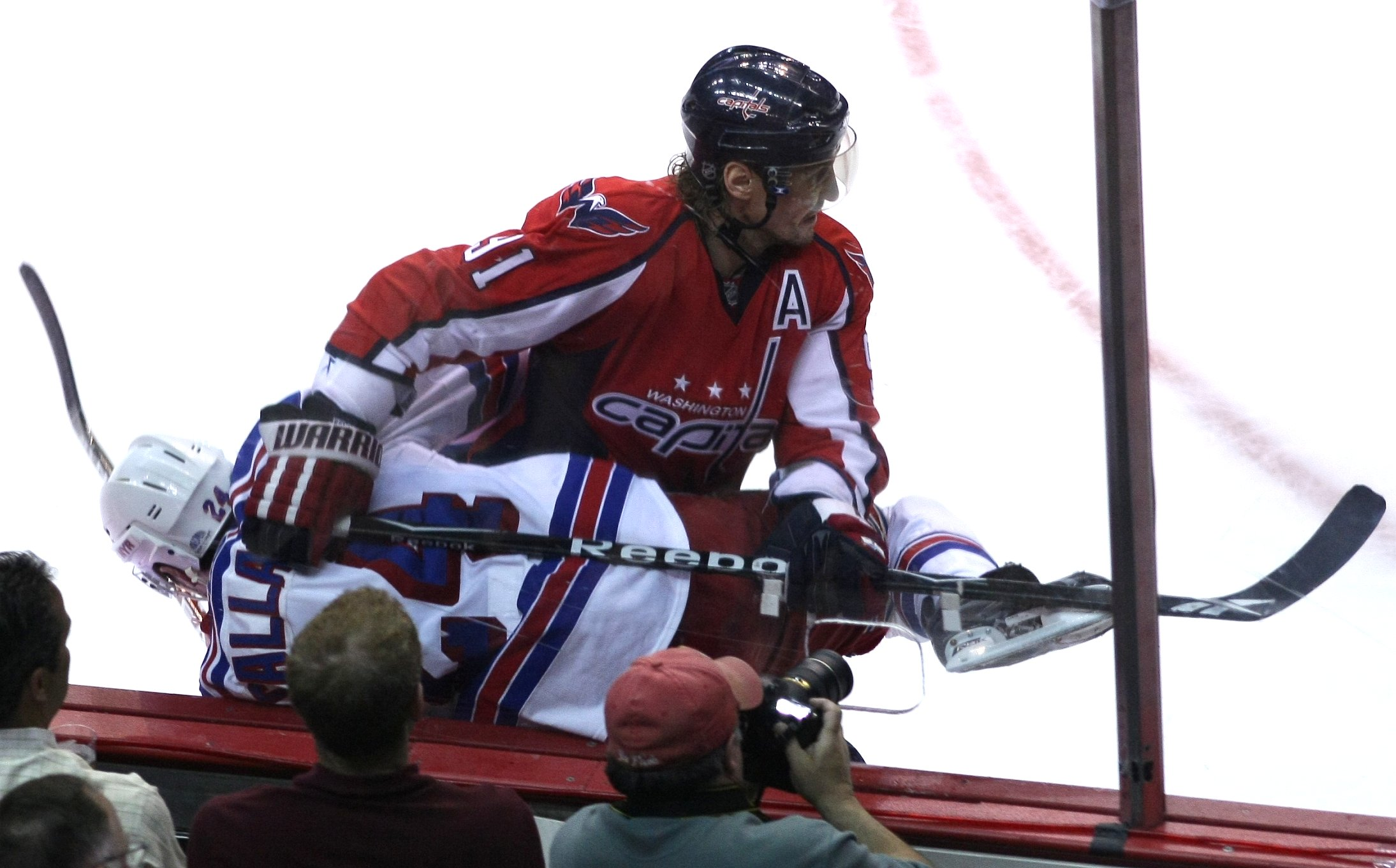
Fedorov giving a check while playing for the Washington Capitals, 2009

On April 28, 2009, in one of his final games in the NHL, after scoring the game-winning goal in the 2009 playoffs against the New York Rangers in a 2–1 game seven contest, then-Capitals head coach Bruce Boudreau stated in a press conference, "Let's face it, sometimes experience pays off. He knew what he had to do, when to do it, and that's what makes him one of the greatest players, ever." Teammate Alexander Ovechkin added, "He's our leader ... He's our best guy in the locker room. He showed it. He's our best guy. He has more experience than anybody in this locker room. He knows how to play like that. He just shows his leadership."

In his book, Jeremy Roenick spoke about Fedorov being one of his top ten favourite players to play against: "He was a horse, bigger than you'd think he was. He could skate, handle the puck like a magician, and check you until you hated him. You didn't get a break when you played centre against Detroit in those days." He added, "Today we talk about Evgeni Malkin and Alex Ovechkin, but neither of those guys could skate with [Alexander] Mogilny or Fedorov or [Pavel] Bure."

=== Kontinental Hockey League ===
For the 2009–10 season, Fedorov returned to Russia, signing a two-year deal with Metallurg Magnitogorsk. He said that he wanted to fulfill his father's lifelong dream of having his two sons play on the same team. Early in the season, Fedorov scored his 1,500th point in official games.

Fedorov announced he would be returning to CSKA Moscow as a player on October 9, 2013. "The legs are still good," and, "I still train twice a week," Fedorov said in response to questions of him continuing his playing career. He would appear in his last two games of his career for CSKA at the 2013 Spengler Cup, registering three shots and one goal. However, he never appeared in a KHL game for the team.

== International play ==
In the (U-20) 1987 World Junior Championships, Fedorov made his national team debut for the Soviet Union. The Soviet team was ejected (as well as Canada) for their part in the infamous "punch-up in Piestany" bench-clearing brawl during the final game. The fight is famous for officials having turned off the arena lights in a desperate attempt at ending the 20-minute melee. He played again with CSKA Moscow teammate Alexander Mogilny in the 1988 World Junior Championships; both made the tournament All-Star Team, finishing with a silver medal.

The Bure–Fedorov–Mogilny line made its international debut at the 1989 World Junior Championships in Anchorage, Alaska. The top line of CSKA Moscow teammates combined for a total 38 points and led the Soviet Union over Canada for the gold medal. The combination of the three formed was promising for head coach Viktor Tikhonov, with expectations to replace the previous top Soviet line, the K–L–M combination of Vladimir Krutov, Larionov and Makarov.

Later that year, Fedorov made his senior debut with the Soviet national team as a 19-year-old at the 1989 World Championships in Sweden. He played with the full roster Soviet Union team that won the gold medal over Canada in their final game, and played along aside club teammates Mogilny and Vladimir Konstantinov. He also led the team in goals (6) and was second in points (9). The Soviet Union would repeat gold at the 1990 World Championships in Switzerland against Czechoslovakia, with Pavel Bure playing on Fedorov's wing.

In the 1991 Canada Cup, the team representing the Soviet Union was missing most of its top stars due to severe political turmoil at home. Many players were declining to play for the team, and some were purposely left off the roster (such as Pavel Bure and Vladimir Konstantinov) for fears of defection. It was not known until weeks before the start of the tournament that they would even send a team. This was the final major senior event in which a team representing the Soviet Union would play. Fedorov was asked to join the team (one year after defection), which he accepted to represent his country. Though the team finished in fifth place, he did help hold an undefeated Canada to a 3–3 tie in Quebec City in their last game, where Fedorov was paired against tournament scoring leader Wayne Gretzky.

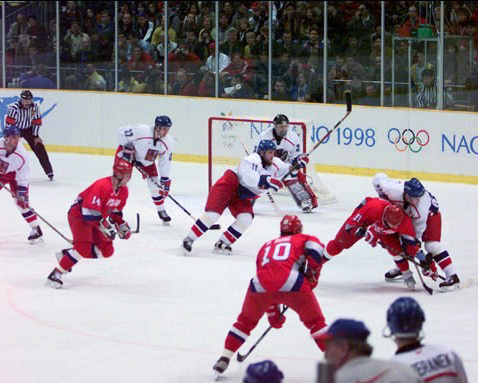
Fedorov (91) with Pavel Bure (10) at the 1998 Winter Olympics in Nagano, Japan

In the 1996 World Cup of Hockey, Russia had played five preliminary games in order to set the groupings for the main tournament stage. Russia was the only team that went undefeated (winning against Finland (Moscow), Germany (Landshut), Sweden (Stockholm), USA (Detroit) and tied against Canada (Calgary). The United States, Sweden and Finland games saw the Bure–Fedorov–Mogilny line for the first (and only) time internationally at senior level, which was considered "perhaps the best forward line on earth" at the time. With Pavel Bure injured at the end of the game against the Americans, he was not able to play in the main tournament. One of Fedorov's goals came in the round robin of the tournament in the second period against Canada in Vancouver on a breakaway pass off the boards from defencemen Darius Kasparaitis, where he sprinted to the puck and shot it over the blocker of goaltender Curtis Joseph to tie the game. Fedorov and Mogilny played on the same line and co-led the team in scoring, although Russia would lose in the semi-finals against the United States after defeating Finland 5–0 in the quarter-finals.

On a team that was missing many of their top stars due to players declining and injuries, Fedorov with Pavel Bure and Mikhail Shtalenkov carried the team to a silver medal with Russia in the 1998 Winter Olympics in Nagano. In the 2002 Winter Olympics in Salt Lake City, Fedorov and the Russians eliminated the Czech Republic in the quarter-finals 1–0, and ended the tournament winning a bronze medal in their final game, against Belarus.

In response on his decision to play hockey at the 2006 Winter Olympics in Turin, Fedorov said, "I don't think it is appropriate to delay my decision about the Olympics any further. As much as I would enjoy representing my country in Italy, I'm afraid that at this point in the season my focus has to remain with the Columbus Blue Jackets... I feel that the most important thing is for me to continue to work towards being 100 percent healthy. My main priority and responsibility is to the Columbus Blue Jackets and I don't believe participating in the Olympics, which is a short, intense tournament, would be the best thing to do."

The Washington Capitals' trio of Alexander Ovechkin, Alexander Semin and Fedorov competed on the same line for Russia and won the gold medal at the 2008 World Championships, 5–4 in overtime against Canada; Fedorov passed to Ilya Kovalchuk to set up the game-winning goal. The tournament was held for the first time in Canada (in Quebec City) for the 100th anniversary celebrations. At the 2009 World Championships, Russia would repeat as champions after again defeating Canada in the final.

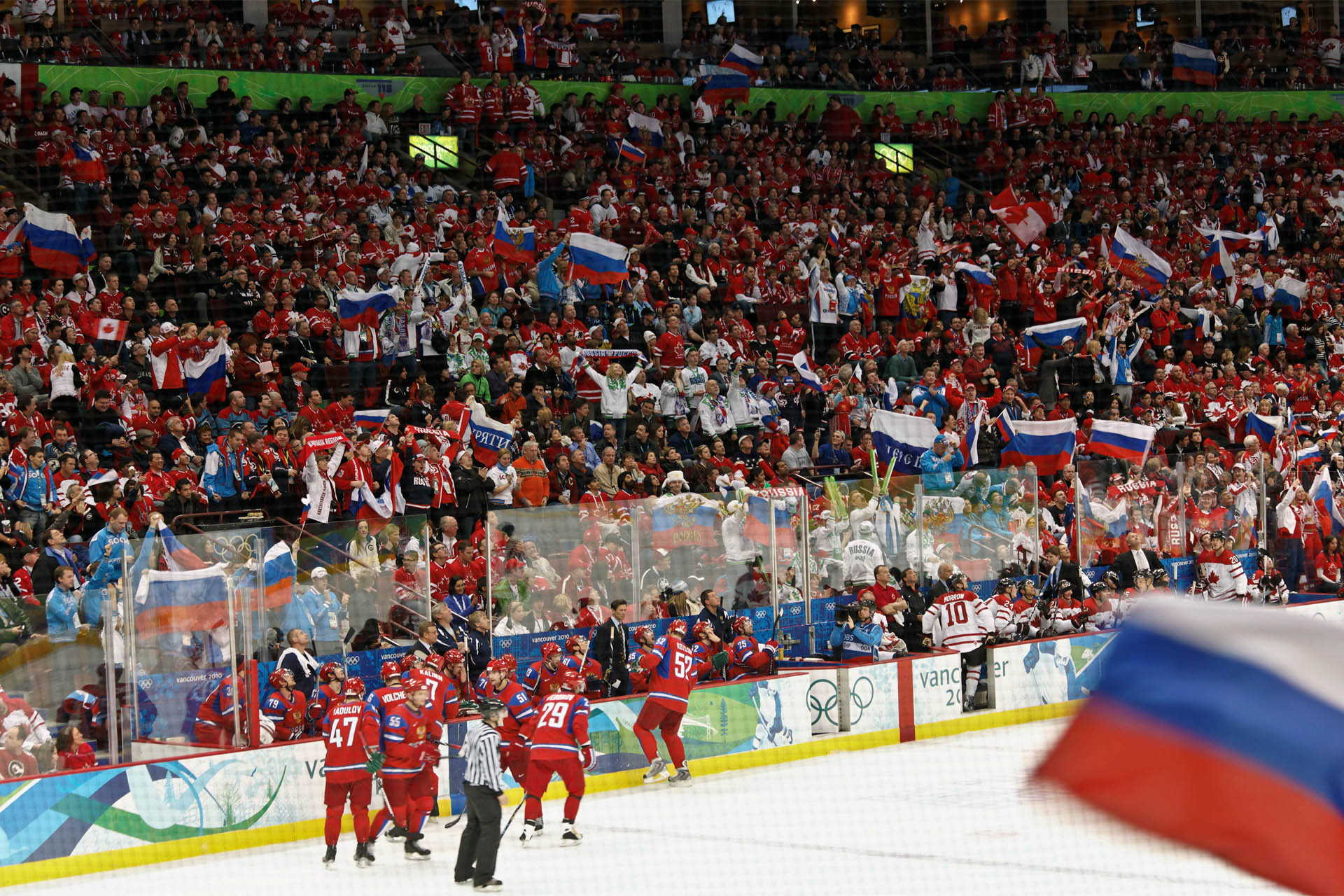
Fedorov (29) with Team Russia at the 2010 Winter Olympics in Vancouver, British Columbia, Canada

Fedorov also played for Russia at the 2010 Winter Olympics in Vancouver, the oldest player in the tournament at age 40. Although Russia entered the competition ranked number one in the world, Russia was eliminated in the quarter-finals. Fedorov nonetheless finished the Olympics at a point-per-game pace and tied Alexander Ovechkin for second overall in team scoring.

On December 27, 2013, Fedorov played for CSKA Moscow in the 2013 Spengler Cup—in two games, he scored one goal.

== Post-playing career ==
On November 9, 2015, Fedorov was inducted into the Hockey Hall of Fame. During the weekend festivities, many of his past coaches and teammates commented on Fedorov's career. Scotty Bowman was speaking about having to put Sergei on defence when injuries were piling up: "He was the best defenseman in the league for a six-week period." Former teammate Brendan Shanahan said, "I'm convinced if Sergei played defense, he could have won a Norris Trophy ... He was so talented, so strong." Wayne Gretzky spoke on their friendship: "He was one of my closer friends that played on another team. Actually, the year he won the Hart Memorial Trophy I think it was, he lived with us for six weeks in the offseason and we trained together and spent a lot of time together." Alexander Ovechkin said he was "the best player I've ever played with. He was unbelievable. You put him in every position and he was going to be the best. His hockey sense was unbelievable. His shot and vision, unbelievable".

=== CSKA Moscow ===
Fedorov was general manager of CSKA Moscow from the 2012-13 KHL season to the 2016-17 KHL season.

On July 14, 2021, Fedorov was named head coach of CSKA. In his first two seasons, he brought CSKA to win back-to-back Gagarin Cup in 7 games. His contract was not renewed following a sub-par 2023–24 season, where CSKA was eliminated from the Gagarin Cup Playoffs in the first round by eventual finalists Lokomotiv Yaroslavl.

== Personal life ==
Fedorov was born to Viktor and Natalia Fedorov in Pskov. Fedorov claimed he and tennis star Anna Kournikova were married in 2001. Kournikova's representatives deny any marriage to Fedorov, however Fedorov's agent, Pat Brisson, claims that although he doesn't know when they got married, he knew "he [Fedorov] was married". Although she claims to have never married the hockey superstar, she did turn over her South Beach condo as part of the divorce. Fedorov was also romantically linked to actress Tara Reid in 2004.

Fedorov is presently married to Corrina Fedorov. Together they have a daughter named Aleksandra and a son named Viktor (named after Fedorov's father).

Fedorov also had a cereal named after him called Fedorov Crunch.

In 2006, Fedorov appeared in Soccer Aid, a football game that takes place in England pitting celebrities against each other to benefit UNICEF UK. He competed for the "rest of the world" squad.

On July 24, 2009, Fedorov filed a lawsuit against Joseph Zada for defrauding on an agreement to pay him $60 million to compensate him for the $43 million Fedorov invested with Zada over the past 11 years. The lawsuit was filed by Fedorov in Michigan. Fedorov won the suit but has been unable to collect on the judgment from Zada.

Fedorov continues his philanthropic endeavours via the Sergei Fedorov Foundation, a 501(c)(3) charitable foundation, which has donated over $800,000 to charities that mostly benefit children in need.

He resides in Moscow during hockey season and splits his summers between Detroit and Miami.

Sergei is the brother of former professional hockey player Fedor Fedorov.

== Awards and honours ==
Award	Year
NHL
NHL All-Rookie team	1991
NHL All-Star Game	1992, 1994, 1996, 2001, 2002, 2003
NHL All-Star Game SuperSkills Competition Fastest Skater	1992, 1994
NHL first All-Star team	1994
Hart Memorial Trophy	1994
Lester B. Pearson Award	1994
Frank J. Selke Trophy	1994, 1996
The Sporting News NHL Player of the Year	1994
Stanley Cup champion	1997, 1998, 2002
NHL All-Star Game SuperSkills Competition Hardest Shot	2002
Hockey Hall of Fame	2015
One of 100 Greatest NHL Players	2017
KHL
KHL All-Star Game	2010, 2011, 2012
Faith Towards Hockey Award	2011
International
World Junior Championship All-Star team	1988
World Junior Championship gold medal (Soviet Union)	1989
World Championship gold medal (Soviet Union)	1989, 1990
World Championship gold medal (Russia)	2008
IIHF Hall of Fame	2016
Soviet
IIHF European Champions Cup (CSKA Moscow)	1988, 1989, 1990
Soviet champion (CSKA Moscow)	1988, 1989
Russia
Master of Sport Award (Ice Hockey)	1998
Kharlamov Trophy	2003
Michigan Sports Hall of Fame	2015

== NHL records and accomplishments ==
- List of NHL records (individual)
- Previously tied the record for Regular season overtime goals (15)
- First European-trained player to win the Hart Memorial Trophy
- First Russian player to reach 1,000 NHL points
- Largest single season amount paid to an NHL athlete ($28 million, 43 total games) (1997–98)
- Previously tied the record for "Fastest Skater" in the 1996 NHL All-Star Game SuperSkills Competition (13.510s '93 Gartner).
- Won the Hardest Shot Contest in the 2002 All-Star game with a recorded speed of 101.5 MPH
- The only player in NHL history with Frank J. Selke Trophy and Hart Memorial Trophy in the same year - 1994.
- Oldest player in NHL history to score a game seven game-winning goal (39 years, 136 days, Washington–New York on April 28, 2009).

== Career statistics ==
=== Regular season and playoffs ===
_{Bold indicates led league}

			Regular season					Playoffs
Season	Team	League	GP	G	A	Pts	PIM	GP	G	A	Pts	PIM
1986–87	CSKA Moscow	USSR	29	6	6	12	12	—	—	—	—	—
1987–88	CSKA Moscow	USSR	48	7	9	16	20	—	—	—	—	—
1988–89	CSKA Moscow	USSR	44	9	8	17	35	—	—	—	—	—
1989–90	CSKA Moscow	USSR	48	19	10	29	20	—	—	—	—	—
1990–91	Detroit Red Wings	NHL	77	31	48	79	66	7	1	5	6	4
1991–92	Detroit Red Wings	NHL	80	32	54	86	72	11	5	5	10	8
1992–93	Detroit Red Wings	NHL	73	34	53	87	72	7	3	6	9	23
1993–94	Detroit Red Wings	NHL	82	56	64	120	34	7	1	7	8	6
1994–95	Detroit Red Wings	NHL	42	20	30	50	24	17	7	**17**	**24**	6
1995–96	Detroit Red Wings	NHL	78	39	68	107	48	19	2	**18**	20	10
1996–97	Detroit Red Wings	NHL	74	30	33	63	30	20	8	12	20	12
1997–98	Detroit Red Wings	NHL	21	6	11	17	25	22	**10**	10	20	12
1998–99	Detroit Red Wings	NHL	77	26	37	63	66	10	1	8	9	8
1999–00	Detroit Red Wings	NHL	68	27	35	62	22	9	4	4	8	4
2000–01	Detroit Red Wings	NHL	75	32	37	69	40	6	2	5	7	0
2001–02	Detroit Red Wings	NHL	81	31	37	68	36	23	5	14	19	20
2002–03	Detroit Red Wings	NHL	80	36	47	83	52	4	1	2	3	0
2003–04	Mighty Ducks of Anaheim	NHL	80	31	34	65	42	—	—	—	—	—
2005–06	Mighty Ducks of Anaheim	NHL	5	0	1	1	2	—	—	—	—	—
2005–06	Columbus Blue Jackets	NHL	62	12	31	43	64	—	—	—	—	—
2006–07	Columbus Blue Jackets	NHL	73	18	24	42	56	—	—	—	—	—
2007–08	Columbus Blue Jackets	NHL	50	9	19	28	30	—	—	—	—	—
2007–08	Washington Capitals	NHL	18	2	11	13	8	7	1	4	5	8
2008–09	Washington Capitals	NHL	52	11	22	33	50	14	1	7	8	12
2009–10	Metallurg Magnitogorsk	KHL	50	9	20	29	47	8	1	1	2	4
2010–11	Metallurg Magnitogorsk	KHL	48	7	16	23	40	20	5	7	12	16
2011–12	Metallurg Magnitogorsk	KHL	43	6	16	22	36	10	1	3	4	6
USSR totals			169	41	33	74	87	—	—	—	—	—
NHL totals			1,248	483	696	1,179	839	183	52	124	176	133
KHL totals			141	22	52	74	123	38	7	11	18	26

=== International ===
Year	Team	Event	Results	GP	G	A	Pts	PIM
1987	Soviet Union	WJC	DQ	6	0	0	0	8
1988	Soviet Union	WJC	2nd place, silver medalist(s)	7	5	7	12	0
1989	Soviet Union	WJC	1st place, gold medalist(s)	7	4	8	12	4
1989	Soviet Union	WC	1st place, gold medalist(s)	10	6	3	9	10
1990	Soviet Union	WC	1st place, gold medalist(s)	10	4	2	6	10
1991	Soviet Union	CC	5th	5	2	2	4	6
1996	Russia	WCH	4th	5	3	3	6	2
1998	Russia	OLY	2nd place, silver medalist(s)	6	1	5	6	8
2002	Russia	OLY	3rd place, bronze medalist(s)	6	2	2	4	4
2008	Russia	WC	1st place, gold medalist(s)	9	5	7	12	8
2010	Russia	OLY	6th	4	0	4	4	6
2010	Russia	WC	2nd place, silver medalist(s)	9	2	4	6	12
Junior totals				20	10	14	24	12
Senior totals				64	25	32	57	66

=== NHL All-Star Games ===
Year	Location	G	A	Pts
1992	Philadelphia	0	2	2
1994	New York City	1	1	2
1996	Boston	0	1	1
2001	Denver	2	0	2
2002	Los Angeles	1	0	1
2003	Sunrise	0	2	2
All-Star totals		4	6	10

== See also ==
- List of NHL statistical leaders
- Notable families in the NHL
- List of NHL players with 1,000 points
- List of NHL players with 1,000 games played
- List of NHL players with 100-point seasons
- List of NHL players with 50-goal seasons
- List of Eastern Bloc defectors

== Notes and references ==
Preceded by Doug Gilmour; Ron Francis	Frank J. Selke Trophy winner 1994; 1996	Succeeded by Ron Francis; Michael Peca
Preceded by Mario Lemieux	Hart Memorial Trophy winner 1994	Succeeded by Eric Lindros
Preceded by Mario Lemieux	Lester B. Pearson Award winner 1994	Succeeded by Eric Lindros
