= Valeri Kamensky =

Russian ice hockey player (born 1966)

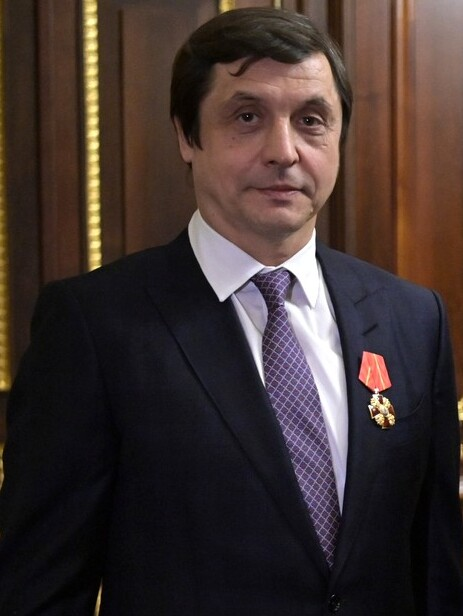
- Kamensky in 2021
- Born: 18 April 1966 (age 59) Voskresensk, Russian SFSR, Soviet Union
- Height: 6 ft 1 in (185 cm)
- Weight: 196 lb (89 kg; 14 st 0 lb)
- Position: Left wing
- Shot: Right
- Played for: Khimik Voskresensk; CSKA Moscow; Quebec Nordiques; HC Ambrì-Piotta; Colorado Avalanche; New York Rangers; Dallas Stars; New Jersey Devils
- National team: Soviet Union and Russia
- NHL draft: 129th overall, 1988; Quebec Nordiques
- Playing career: 1982–2005

Medal record

ice hockey

Representing Soviet Union

Olympic Games
Gold medal – first place	1988 Calgary	

World Championships
Gold medal – first place	1986 Soviet Union	
Gold medal – first place	1989 Sweden	
Gold medal – first place	1990 Switzerland	
Silver medal – second place	1987 Austria	
Bronze medal – third place	1991 Finland	

Canada Cup
Silver medal – second place	1987 Canada	

World Junior Championship
Gold medal – first place	1986 Canada	
Bronze medal – third place	1985 Finland	

European Junior Championships
Gold medal – first place	1984 West Germany	

Representing Russia

Olympic Games
Silver medal – second place	1998 Nagano	

Valeri Viktorovich Kamensky (Russian: Валерий Викторович Каменский) (born 18 April 1966) is a Russian former professional ice hockey player. He played in the Soviet Championship League before moving to the National Hockey League. Internationally, he represented the Soviet Union men's national ice hockey team and later the Russia men's national ice hockey team. Kamensky was inducted into the IIHF Hall of Fame in 2016.

== Playing career ==
Before the National Hockey League (NHL), he started his career with Khimik Voskresensk in the Soviet Championship League (1982–1985) and then played for the powerhouse club CSKA Moscow (1985–1991). In 1991 he moved to the NHL, where he played for the Quebec Nordiques (1991–1995, spending the 1994 lockout break in HC Ambri-Piotta, Switzerland), Colorado Avalanche (1995–1999), New York Rangers (1999–2001), Dallas Stars and New Jersey Devils (2001–2002). He won a Stanley Cup in 1996 with the Avalanche.

He is also known for scoring one of the most memorable goals of the 1997–98 season. He received a pass and scored while spinning in mid-air. The goal was used in the opening intro for the NHL 98 video game. He also scored the first goal in the Avalanche's history in Denver since the relocation from Quebec City.

== Career statistics ==
=== Regular season and playoffs ===
			Regular season					Playoffs
Season	Team	League	GP	G	A	Pts	PIM	GP	G	A	Pts	PIM
1982–83	Khimik Voskresensk	USSR	5	0	0	0	0	—	—	—	—	—
1983–84	Khimik Voskresensk	USSR	20	2	2	4	6	—	—	—	—	—
1984–85	Khimik Voskresensk	USSR	45	9	3	12	24	—	—	—	—	—
1985–86	CSKA Moscow	USSR	40	15	9	24	8	—	—	—	—	—
1986–87	CSKA Moscow	USSR	37	13	8	21	16	—	—	—	—	—
1987–88	CSKA Moscow	USSR	51	26	20	46	40	—	—	—	—	—
1988–89	CSKA Moscow	USSR	40	18	10	28	30	—	—	—	—	—
1989–90	CSKA Moscow	USSR	45	19	18	37	38	—	—	—	—	—
1990–91	CSKA Moscow	USSR	46	20	26	46	66	—	—	—	—	—
1991–92	Quebec Nordiques	NHL	23	7	14	21	14	—	—	—	—	—
1992–93	Quebec Nordiques	NHL	32	15	22	37	14	6	0	1	1	6
1993–94	Quebec Nordiques	NHL	76	28	37	65	42	—	—	—	—	—
1994–95	HC Ambrì–Piotta	NDA	12	13	6	19	2	—	—	—	—	—
1994–95	Quebec Nordiques	NHL	40	10	20	30	22	2	1	0	1	0
1995–96	Colorado Avalanche	NHL	81	38	47	85	85	22	10	12	22	28
1996–97	Colorado Avalanche	NHL	68	28	38	66	38	17	8	14	22	16
1997–98	Colorado Avalanche	NHL	75	26	40	66	60	7	2	3	5	18
1998–99	Colorado Avalanche	NHL	65	14	30	44	28	10	4	5	9	4
1999–2000	New York Rangers	NHL	58	13	19	32	24	—	—	—	—	—
2000–01	New York Rangers	NHL	65	14	20	34	36	—	—	—	—	—
2001–02	Dallas Stars	NHL	24	3	6	9	2	—	—	—	—	—
2001–02	New Jersey Devils	NHL	30	4	8	12	18	2	0	0	0	0
2003–04	Khimik Voskresensk	RSL	23	5	9	14	53	—	—	—	—	—
2004–05	Khimik Voskresensk	RSL	57	17	19	36	59	—	—	—	—	—
USSR/Russia totals			329	122	96	218	230	—	—	—	—	—
NHL totals			637	200	301	501	383	66	25	35	60	72

=== International ===
Year	Team	Event	Result	GP	G	A	Pts	PIM
1984	Soviet Union	EJC	1st place, gold medalist(s)	5	1	3	4	0
1985	Soviet Union	WJC	3rd place, bronze medalist(s)	7	2	2	4	8
1986	Soviet Union	WJC	1st place, gold medalist(s)	7	7	6	13	6
1986	Soviet Union	WC	1st place, gold medalist(s)	9	2	0	2	8
1987	Soviet Union	WC	2nd place, silver medalist(s)	10	5	3	8	6
1987	Soviet Union	CC	2nd place, silver medalist(s)	9	6	1	7	6
1988	Soviet Union	OG	1st place, gold medalist(s)	8	4	2	6	4
1989	Soviet Union	WC	1st place, gold medalist(s)	10	4	4	8	8
1990	Soviet Union	WC	1st place, gold medalist(s)	10	7	2	9	20
1991	Soviet Union	WC	3rd place, bronze medalist(s)	10	6	5	11	10
1994	Russia	WC	5th	6	5	5	10	12
1998	Russia	OG	2nd place, silver medalist(s)	6	1	2	3	0
2000	Russia	WC	11th	6	0	0	0	10
Junior totals				19	10	11	21	14
Senior totals				84	40	24	64	84

== Awards ==
- 1985–86: Gold medal, CSKA Moscow (Soviet Championship League).
- 1986: Gold medal (Ice Hockey World Championships).
- 1986–87: Gold medal, CSKA Moscow (Soviet Championship League).
- 1988: Gold medal (XV Olympic Winter Games).
- 1987–88: Gold medal, CSKA Moscow (Soviet Championship League).
- 1987–88: Gold medal, CSKA Moscow (USSR Cup).
- 1989: Gold medal (Ice Hockey World Championships).
- 1988–89: Gold medal, CSKA Moscow (Soviet Championship League).
- 1990: Gold medal (Ice Hockey World Championships).
- 1995–96: Stanley Cup, Colorado Avalanche (NHL)
- 1998: Silver medal (XVIII Olympic Winter Games).
- 2004–05: Faith Towards Hockey Award.
- 2016: Inducted into the IIHF Hall of Fame.

Preceded by Andrei Khomutov	Soviet MVP; 1991	Succeeded by Nikolai Borschevsky (CIS National League)
