= Jan BenDor =

American activist

- Born: 1946 (age 79–80)
- Education: University of Michigan
- Occupation: Social worker
- Years active: 1971-present

Jan BenDor (born 1946) is a women's rights activist based in the Ann Arbor area of Michigan in the United States. Known as the "Founding Mother of the Rape Crisis Center movement in Michigan," she was named to the Michigan Women's Hall of Fame in 1991.

== Early life ==
BenDor was born in 1946. She received a Master of Social Work from the University of Michigan and is currently ABD in the University of Michigan's psychology doctoral program.

== Women's Crisis Center ==
BenDor was active at the Women's Crisis Center of Ann Arbor. The Center was a non-profit phone counseling service run for and by women of the community. In addition to telephone support for any problems women had, the Center had information about community resource, events, and support groups. BenDor contributed to two known publications related to the Crisis Center. Freedom from Rape is an underground newspaper with information about area rape statistics, rape myths, and how community and law enforcement impact rape culture. How to Organize a Women's Crisis-Service Center is both a description of the genesis of the Women's Crisis Center of Ann Arbor and a guide for developing a center.

== Michigan Women's Task Force on Rape ==
In the early 1970s, BenDor worked as part of the anti-rape movement to change Michigan State law related to sexual assault. The Michigan Women's Task Force on Rape, established in 1973, had as its main goals to "de-sexualize" the crime of rape and to move burden of proof from the victim to the accused. Michigan's Criminal Sexual Conduct Statute (Public Act No. 266) was approved on August 12, 1974, and went into effect on April 1, 1975.

== Domino's Pizza boycott ==
In 1989, the National Organization for Women declared a boycott of Domino's Pizza owner Tom Monaghan's support of anti-abortion legislation in the state of Michigan and his cancellation of events to be held at Domino's Farms in Ann Arbor. The group also cited Monaghan's right wing activities in Central America, discriminatory hiring practices, and anti-union stance as reasons for the boycott. The Coalition to Boycott Domino's Pizza, or as it later became known, included members of NOW, Ann Arbor Coalition to Defend Abortion Right, Industrial Workers of the World, Latin American Solidarity Committee, among others. BenDor, as president of the Ann Arbor chapter of NOW, led the boycott. The Detroit chapter of the NAACP followed in 1990 with a call for a similar boycott of the chain because of Monaghan's lack of response to the Operation Fair Share Program, which promoted the hiring of blacks.

== United Auto Workers ==
As the Operations Manager for the Eastern Michigan University Career Services Center, BenDor was involved in the United Auto Workers-Technical Office Professionals Local 1976 in the 1980s and early 1990s, serving as vice president of the local.

== Michigan Election Reform Alliance ==
BenDor is a founding member of the Michigan Election Reform Alliance (MERA). Its mission is to ensure "the realization of election processes that consistently uphold the principles of democracy to ensure the confidence of voters and maximize representation of all citizens of the United States of America." She is currently the statewide coordinator and grants chair.

== Local government service ==
BenDor served for over a decade as Trustee, Planning Commissioner, and Deputy Township Clerk for Pittsfield Charter Township, where she worked in support of green space preservation, establishment of long term plans for the maintenance of public services, restrictions on predatory lending, election reform, and promotion of voter registration.

== Local political activism ==
Between 2007 and 2010, BenDor took action to preserve a 77-acre parcel of agricultural land in Superior Township, Michigan, where she lives. The land had attracted interest from developers, who hoped to rezone it and open a privately operated sewage-treatment system on it with the intention of serving a planned 236-home subdivision. BenDor helped to organize opposition to a proposed settlement between the developers and the township, although in 2010 the township agreed to a settlement. She expressed opposition to the decision, which she felt invited future litigation and constituted "bailing out" the developers.

BenDor is the election specialist for the Dearborn-based political advocacy group Michigan Rising, and which in April 2012 targeted Michigan Governor Rick Snyder for recall. In a press release she referred to Snyder as "bad for Michigan" and accused him of harming the state's children by removing thousands of them from food aid, diminishing the School Aid Fund by $400 million, and reducing school payments.

== Personal life ==
BenDor currently lives in Ypsilanti, Michigan with her husband, with whom she has two sons. In 2011, she completed a certificate in Digital Video Production at Washtenaw Community College. She currently works as a producer at QED Video. BenDor has worked as an adjunct instructor at the Eastern Michigan University School of Social Work. She continues to be an active supporter of women's rights and local government.
