= David S. Brown =

American historian (born 1966)

David Scott Brown (born 29 September 1966) is a Horace E. Raffensperger professor of history at Elizabethtown College, Pennsylvania, United States. He is the author of several books, including biographies of Richard Hofstadter and F. Scott Fitzgerald.

== Education and career ==
Brown was born on 29 September 1966 in Troy, Ohio. He graduated from Wright State University in 1990 and earned a master's degree from the University of Akron in 1992. He completed his Ph.D. in 1995 at the University of Toledo.

Brown joined Elizabethtown College in 1997, after previously teaching at the University of Toledo, Washtenaw Community College, and Saginaw Valley State University. He was named Raffensperger Professor in 2012.

== Books ==
In 2006, he published Richard Hofstadter: An Intellectual Biography. The book explores the life and times of Columbia University historian Richard Hofstadter.

His 2009 book Beyond the Frontier: The Midwestern Voice in American Historical Writing (also from the University of Chicago Press) is a study of Midwestern historians and their influence on the American historical profession.

He is also the author of Thomas Jefferson: A Biographical Companion (ABC-Clio, 1998); Moderates: The Vital Center of American Politics, from the Founding to Today (University of North Carolina Press, 2016); Paradise Lost: A Life of F. Scott Fitzgerald (Harvard University Press, 2017); The Last American Aristocrat: The Brilliant Life and Improbable Education of Henry Adams (Scribner, 2020); The First Populist: The Defiant Life of Andrew Jackson (Scribner, 2022) and In the Arena: Theodore Roosevelt in War, Peace, and Revolution (Scribner, 2025).
