= Washtenaw Community College =

Public college in Ann Arbor Charter Township, Michigan, US

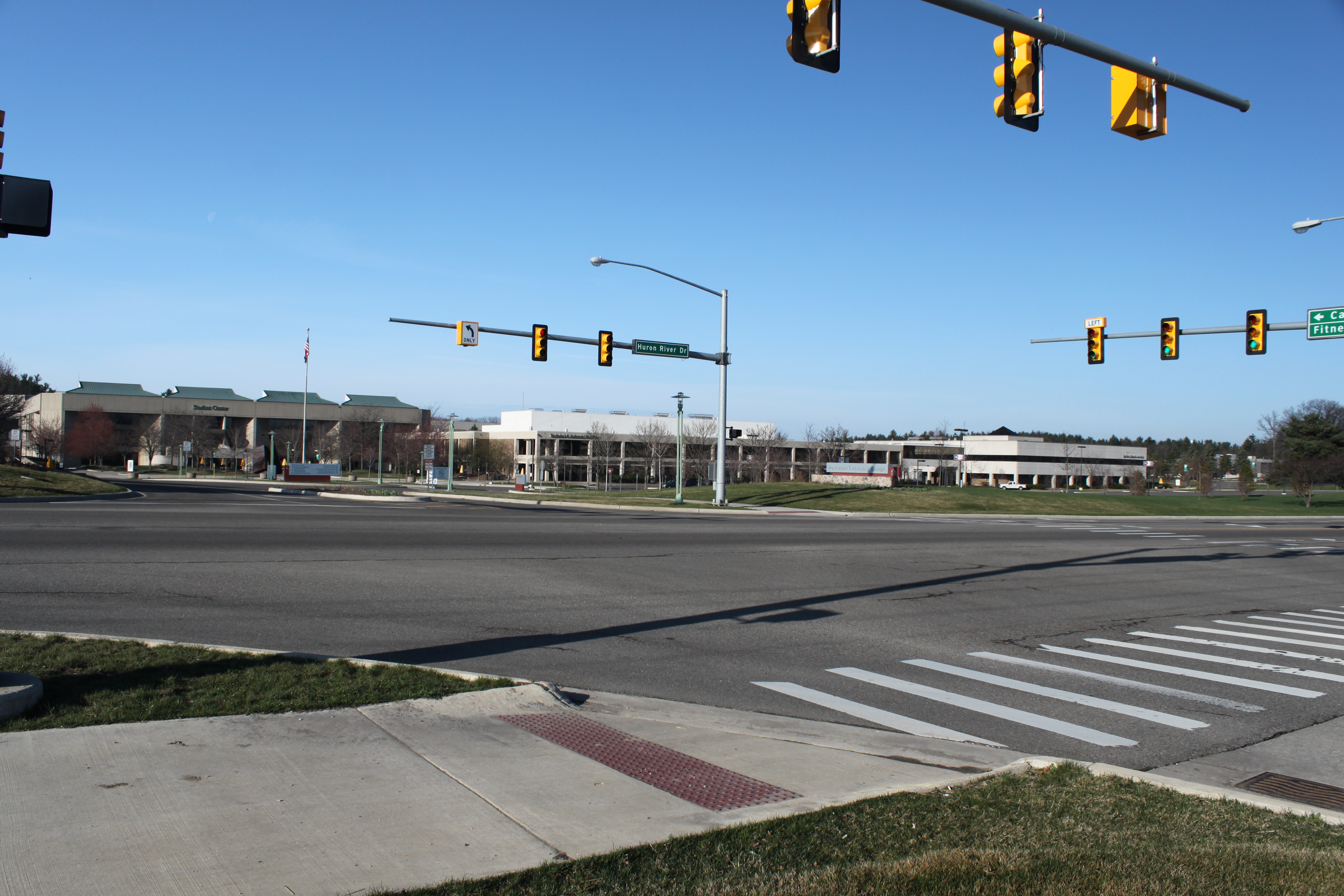
- Type: Public community college
- Established: 1965
- Endowment: $39.4 million (2025)
- President: Rose B. Bellanca
- Students: 20,000
- Location: Ann Arbor Charter Township, Michigan, United States; 42.2641°N 83.6650°W
- Campus: Suburban, 291 acres
- Colours: Green and yellow
- Mascot: Alpha
- Website: www.wccnet.edu

Washtenaw Community College (WCC) is a public community college in Ann Arbor Charter Township, Michigan. Founded in 1965, WCC enrolls more than 20,000 students from over 100 countries to study each year and grants certificates and degrees to over 2,600 students annually.

== History ==
Washtenaw Community College welcomed students for its first semester in September 1966. Since there was no central campus at the time, the 1,200 students who enrolled in more than 30 occupational areas took classes at various sites throughout the county, including an elementary school, dairy farm, in a church basement as well as at a former fire station and the abandoned Willow Run bomber plant.

The college purchased an apple orchard in December 1965 and began construction in the summer of 1967. WCC operations moved to the new campus (and former apple orchard) on Huron River Drive in September 1970.

=== Presidents ===
- David H. Ponitz – 1965–1974
- Gunder A. Myran – 1975–1998
- Larry L. Whitworth – 1998–2011
- Rose B. Bellanca – 2011–present

== Academics ==
The college offers approximately 137 credit programs in business, health, advanced manufacturing and skilled trades, public service, humanities, social science, math, natural sciences, art, and technology. WCC has comprehensive training partnerships with local and national businesses and organizations, and has transfer agreements with many higher education institutions, including the University of Michigan and Eastern Michigan University. The college has extension centers in Brighton and Hartland. WCC offers programming through the Harriet Street Center and Parkridge Community Center, which are both in Ypsilanti, Michigan.

Washtenaw Community College is accredited by the Higher Learning Commission (HLC).

== Campus life ==
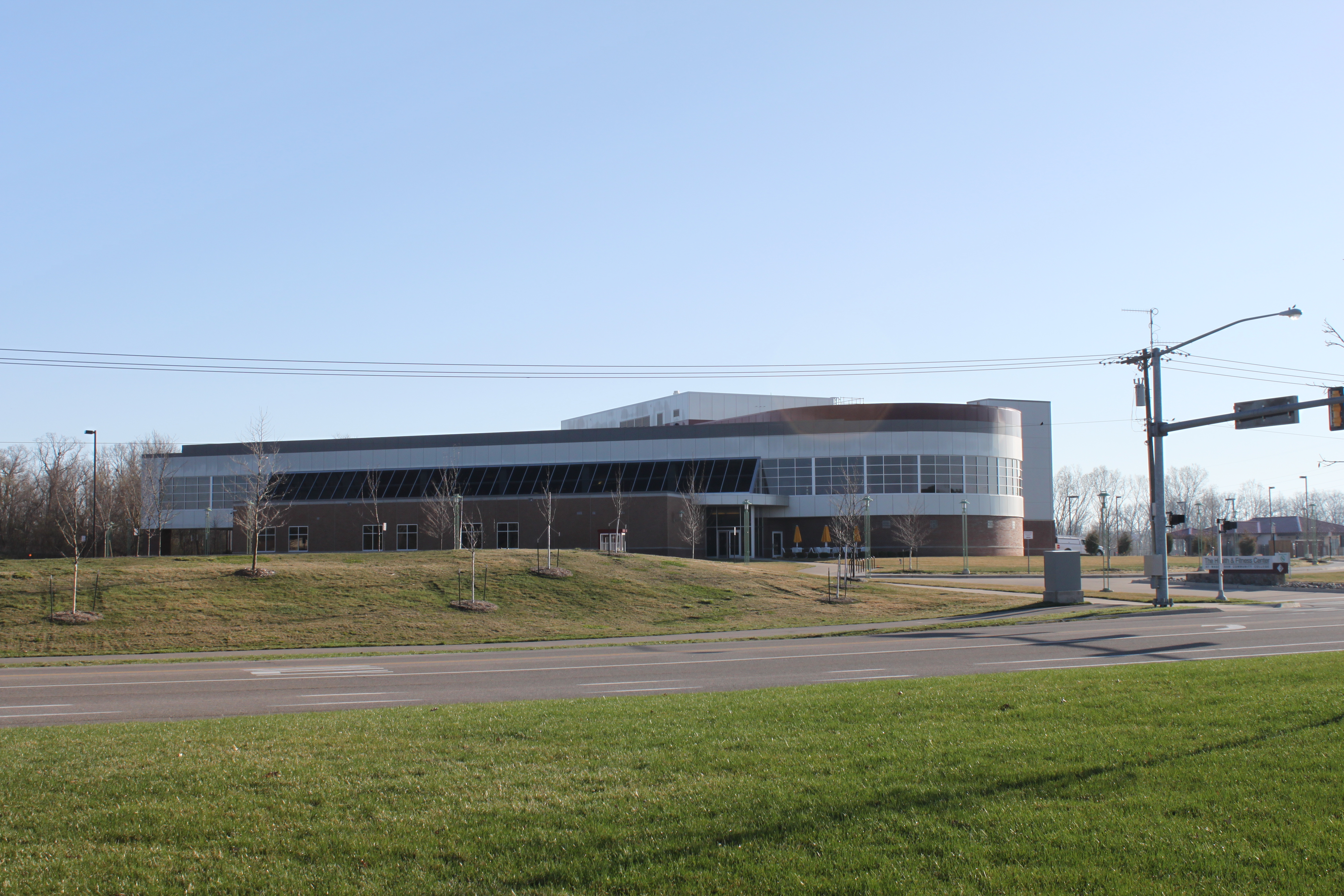
The Health & Fitness Center

The Washtenaw Community College core campus includes 14 instructional and auxiliary buildings and is surrounded by 291 acres of woods and naturalized spaces in the heart of Washtenaw County and southeast Michigan.

The student headcount for the 2016–2017 academic year was 20,718. Of that, 2,170 were first generation students; 1,013 were single parents; and 643 were veterans. The 2,667 students who graduated during the academic year were awarded 2,568 academic certificates and 1,287 academic degrees.

Adults age 18–24 years represent almost 48 percent of the WCC student body. According to data for the Fall 2017 semester, 812 international students attended Washtenaw Community College. These students receive additional support through the on-campus International Student Center.

Many students receive financial aid in part because of the WCC Foundation. According to 2016–2017 school year data, the Foundation awarded approximately 1,000 scholarships, totaling more than $700,000. The Foundation oversees the Student Emergency Fund, a project that assists students with unexpected financial strains, including shutoff notices, car repairs, medical expenses and food. The Student Resource Center runs a food pantry that is free to WCC students.

The college's Advanced Transportation Center was established to help build the talent pipeline for the mobility industry as well as meet the needs of incumbent workers to stay up-to-date on rapidly developing advanced manufacturing, intelligent transportation, and automotive technology. Since 2015, WCC has spent more than $8 million in equipment and facility upgrades for the center to outfit the college with state-of-the-art equipment to train the next generation of welders, technicians and engineers. This includes $4.4 million in funding awarded through the Michigan Community College Skilled Trades Equipment Program.

Washtenaw Community College is publicly funded, with an annual operating budget in excess of $100 million; the college employs nearly 1,500 people in full- and part-time positions. WCC is one of the largest employers in Washtenaw County.

The Washtenaw Voice is the student-run newspaper. Started in December 1966, they publish in the fall and winter semesters.

Orchard Radio broadcasts live on the web and is one of the first internet-based radio formats produced by a college.

The campus is home to the Washtenaw Technical Middle College, a charter high school whose graduates earn college degrees and certificates by taking classes alongside WCC students.

Washtenaw Community College provides a nationally accredited and licensed child care facility in the Family Education Building for children age 18 months to 5 years. The service center was established in 1968 for WCC students, staff and faculty. The center offers a comprehensive child development program which emphasizes the child's self-identity and feeling of worth. Children are supported in strengthening learning in key areas through active learning, discovery, and problem solving. Due to the COVID-19 pandemic, the Family Education Building was temporarily closed in March 2020, which was announced to be permanent in April 2021.

The college claims ownership of the largest fossiliferous limestone rock (55 tons and roughly 400 million years old) ever unearthed in the region.

== Veteran Assistance ==
WCC opened a veterans' center in 2012 to centralize the work done to help veterans and active duty members transition to college. The center unveiled its new name – Wadhams Veterans Center – in November 2015, honoring Tim and Laurie Wadhams for their ongoing financial support of WCC, particularly student veterans.

The Wadhams Veterans Center serves veterans and current military personnel, spouses and dependents of veterans, and students in the National Guard or reserves. The center seeks to integrate veterans into the college community by helping with their transition and offering any assistance veterans may need.

== Notable alumni ==
- Jan BenDor – American video producer and activist
- Aisha Bowe – American aerospace engineer and entrepreneur
- Stephen Bray – American songwriter and drummer
- Lorna Courtney – American stage actress
- David Curson – American politician
- Richard Davis – American electronic music composer
- Eric Jackson – American journalist and politician
- Willem Koops – Dutch politician and lawyer
- Mike Manley – American comic book artist
- Benjamin Okolski – American pair skater
- Jason Stollsteimer – American indie rock musician
- Oluyemi Thomas – American jazz saxophonist

== Notable faculty ==
- F. DuBois Bowman – American statistician
- David S. Brown – American historian
- Keith Gave – American journalist
- Jason Morgan – American politician
- Lynn Rivers – American politician and lawyer
- Frances Kai-Hwa Wang – American writer and artist
