= Jenna Lê =

American poet and medical doctor

- Born: Jenna Lê; Minneapolis, Minnesota
- Writing career
- Genre: Poetry

Jenna Lê is an American poet and medical doctor. A Minnesota-born daughter of Vietnam War refugees, Lê grew up outside Minneapolis and earned her B.A. in Mathematics from Harvard University and her M.D. from Columbia University.

== Career ==
She is the author of two full-length collections of poems, Six Rivers (NYQ Books, 2011), which was a Small Press Distribution Poetry Bestseller, and A History of the Cetacean American Diaspora (Indolent Books, 2018; first edition: Anchor & Plume Press, 2016), which won Second Place in the 2017 Elgin Awards. Her poetry, fiction, essays, book criticism, and poetry translations have been published widely. Her book Six Rivers reflects on four actual rivers the Perfume, Mississippi, Charles and Hudson, and two conceptual ones, the Aorta and the Styx. Other poems draw parallels between the experience of migratory animals and human migrants. A reviewer in the Minneapolis Star Tribune wrote that, "her work reminds us why poetry can be so exciting -- not because it shows us the world as we already know it, but because it takes the world we already know and makes it strange and new."
