= Janice Lobo Sapigao =

Filipina American poet

Sapigao at FilBookFest 2026

Janice Lobo Sapigao is an American Filipina poet and educator. In 2020, Sapigao became the 6th Poet Laureate for Santa Clara County, California. Sapigao also founded the Santa Clara County's Youth Poet Laureate program.

== Personal life ==
Sapigao grew up on the Northside San Jose, California. Her parents were first-generation Filipino immigrants. Sapigao and her mother moved in with her cousin after her father died when she was six years old.

== Career ==
In 2016, Sapigao published her poetry book microchips for millions. In 2017, she published another poetry book, Like a Solid to a Shadow. That same year Sapigao was named as one of KQED Arts’ Women to Watch. On April 23, 2018, Sapigao performed alongside Raquel Salas Rivera and Adeeba Talukder "Translation/Migration Mixtape" for the Asian American Writers' Workshop.

In 2020, Sapigao was named as one of 23 recipients for the Academy of American Poets' Poets Laureate Fellowships. She was appointed Poet Laureate for Santa Clara County, California. Sapigao founded the Santa Clara County's Youth Poet Laureate program.

Sapigao also works as an Assistant Professor of English at Skyline College in San Bruno, California.
