= Vladimir Konstantinov =

Russian ice hockey player (born 1967)

- Born: 19 March 1967 (age 59) Murmansk, Russian SFSR, Soviet Union
- Height: 5 ft 11 in (180 cm)
- Weight: 176 lb (80 kg; 12 st 8 lb)
- Position: Defense
- Shot: Right
- Played for: CSKA Moscow; Detroit Red Wings
- National team: Soviet Union
- NHL draft: 221st overall, 1989; Detroit Red Wings
- Playing career: 1984–1997
Medal record
Representing Soviet Union
Men's ice hockey
World Championships
Gold medal – first place	1986 Soviet Union
Gold medal – first place	1989 Sweden
Gold medal – first place	1990 Switzerland
Bronze medal – third place	1991 Finland
World Junior Championships
Gold medal – first place	1986 Canada

Vladimir Nikolaevich Konstantinov (Russian: Владимир Николаевич Константинов; born 19 March 1967) is a Russian former professional ice hockey player who played his entire National Hockey League (NHL) career, from 1991 to 1997 with the Detroit Red Wings. Previously, he had played for Soviet club CSKA Moscow. His career ended due to a limousine crash six days after the Red Wings' 1997 Stanley Cup victory.

== Playing career ==
=== Defection from the Soviet Union ===
Konstantinov was drafted 221st overall in the 1989 NHL entry draft by the Detroit Red Wings, after impressing a Wings scout at the 1987 World Junior Championships, where a brawl broke out in the Soviet Union–Canada game.

Although the end of the Cold War was approaching, the Soviet Union was still not allowing their young ice hockey players to leave the country to play in the NHL. The Red Wings worked for over two years to get Konstantinov to Detroit. Konstantinov had previously signed a 25-year contract committing himself to CSKA Moscow which was a department of the Russian army. If he deserted, he would be considered a felon in Russia, which would make him ineligible for a work visa in the United States. He also had a wife and daughter, and would not consider leaving without them.

A Russian journalist named Valery Matveev worked with Wings executive vice-president Jim Lites to secure an army discharge for Konstantinov. With cash provided by the Red Wings, Matveev bribed six Russian doctors to diagnose and confirm that Konstantinov had inoperable cancer, and thus secured his medical discharge from the military in the summer of 1991. The Red Wings were planning to fly Konstantinov and his family out from Russia and get him to Detroit in time for the start of training camp in September, but the 1991 Soviet coup d'état attempt forced a change in plans. With the airports closed, Matveev took the family by train to Budapest. Lites met them there, in Red Wings' owner Mike Ilitch's private jet, and went back to Detroit with Konstantinov aboard. His wife and daughter followed two days later on a commercial flight.

=== Detroit Red Wings ===
Konstantinov played more aggressively than most of his Russian contemporaries, specializing in getting opponents off their game. "For my game," he explained, "I don't need to score the goal. I need someone to start thinking about me and forgetting about scoring goals." While he was known as "Vladdie" to his teammates, his aggressive style of play earned him the nicknames "Vladiator" and "Vlad the Impaler" among the media and fans, as well as "the Red Shark".

Konstantinov was part of the unit known as "The Russian Five", which consisted of him and fellow defenseman Slava Fetisov, and forwards Igor Larionov, Sergei Fedorov and Slava Kozlov.

Konstantinov earned the NHL Plus/Minus Award in 1995–96, with a plus/minus difference of +60. The +60 was the highest rating a player achieved since Wayne Gretzky finished with a +70 in the 1986–87 season; it wouldn't be matched or surpassed until Johnny Gaudreau registered a +64 in the 2021-22 season.

In 1996–97, Konstantinov helped his team to win the Stanley Cup against the Philadelphia Flyers. Flyers head coach Terry Murray expected his top line of centre Eric Lindros, left winger John LeClair and right winger Mikael Renberg—known as the "Legion of Doom" for its scoring and toughness—to face Konstantinov. However, Red Wings head coach Scotty Bowman surprised the Flyers by instead opting for the finesse-oriented defense pairing of Nicklas Lidström and Larry Murphy to neutralize the Legion of Doom's forechecking. In that same year, Konstantinov was runner-up to the New York Rangers' Brian Leetch for the James Norris Memorial Trophy, given to the NHL's best defenseman. However, 1996–97 would prove to be Konstantinov's final season.

== Limousine crash ==
On 13 June 1997, following a golf outing with the Stanley Cup celebrating the Red Wings' championship triumph, Konstantinov, along with teammate Viacheslav Fetisov and team masseur Sergei Mnatsakanov, hired a limousine to drive them home. The driver, Richard Gnida, whose license was suspended at the time for drunk driving, lost control of the limousine and hit a tree in the median of Woodward Avenue in Birmingham, Michigan. As a result of the limousine crash, Konstantinov suffered from serious head injuries and paralysis, spending several weeks in a coma. Mnatsakanov also sustained significant head injuries and was paralyzed from the waist down; he died in August 2024. Fetisov escaped with relatively minor injuries and was able to play the following season.

"Believe/Верим" patch worn by the Red Wings during the 1997–98 season, commemorating both Konstantinov and team massage therapist Sergei Mnatsakanov.

After the Red Wings successfully defended the Stanley Cup in 1998, Konstantinov was brought onto the ice in a wheelchair, surrounded by his teammates, to celebrate the win. Team captain Steve Yzerman also defied tradition and handed Konstantinov the Cup first; it is customary in the NHL that the winning team's captain be the first to hoist the Stanley Cup. Throughout the playoffs the Red Wings' catchphrase was the single word, "Believe", and throughout the 1997–98 season the Red Wings wore a patch, with the initials of Konstantinov and Mnatsakanov featured prominently, with the word "Believe" written in both English and Russian.

Although Konstantinov was never able to play hockey again, the Detroit Red Wings still recognized him as part of their team. The Red Wings sought and received special dispensation from the NHL Commissioner Gary Bettman to have his name engraved on the Stanley Cup after they won the 1998 title.

== Retirement ==
Konstantinov's jersey #16 has not been reissued by the Red Wings since his last game, out of respect for him. While it has not been formally retired, it has long been understood that no Red Wing will ever wear it again. In 1999, newly acquired Pat Verbeek, who had worn #16 for much of his career, switched to #15. A similar situation occurred in 2001 when the Red Wings signed Brett Hull, who had worn #16 for the bulk of his career with the St. Louis Blues and Dallas Stars; Hull switched to #17. Drafted prospect Xavier Ouellet, who had worn #16 as a member of the Grand Rapids Griffins, switched to #61 for the Red Wings.

The Red Wings kept his locker set up for him through the 1997–1998 season, although he would never be capable of playing hockey again. A rock engraved with "Believe" sat in his place.

Konstantinov's condition has improved considerably since the crash. While he still has trouble speaking and walking, he has been seen several times a season watching Red Wings games from a private box in Detroit. In a profile with the NHL, Vladimir's wife Irina noted that injuries to his brain were in part to the left frontal lobe; she said that Vladimir "can't process idealistic feelings about life, like love of country or happiness that his child is graduating. Everything for him is matter of fact."

Konstantinov returned to the ice at Joe Louis Arena, helped by a walker, for the pre-game number retirement ceremony for Steve Yzerman on 2 January 2007.

At the 2014 NHL Winter Classic, Konstantinov was helped onto the ice for a rare Russian Five reunion with his former teammates Sergei Fedorov, Viacheslav Fetisov, Vyacheslav Kozlov and Igor Larionov.

On 6 March 2014, he was in attendance at the retirement of former teammate Nicklas Lidström's number.

On 27 December 2016, he was in attendance along with 29 other members of the 1997 Stanley Cup winning Red Wings team and former coach Scotty Bowman to celebrate the 20th anniversary of the 1997 Stanley Cup championship team.

Konstantinov was present for the final game at Joe Louis Arena, participating with multiple other Red Wings legends in the post-game ceremony.

On 12 January 2026, Konstantinov was present for the jersey retirement ceremony of his fellow Russian 5 teammate Sergei Fedorov at Little Caesars Arena in Detroit.

== International play ==
Konstantinov has participated in six international tournaments for the Soviet Union:

- 1986 World Junior Ice Hockey Championships
- 1986 World Ice Hockey Championships
- 1987 World Junior Ice Hockey Championships
- 1989 World Ice Hockey Championships
- 1990 Men's World Ice Hockey Championships
- 1991 Men's World Ice Hockey Championships

During the final game of the 1987 World Junior Ice Hockey Championships between Canada and the Soviet Union, a bench-clearing brawl known as the Punch-up in Piestany took place. The fight is infamous for officials having turned off the arena lights in a desperate attempt at ending the 20 minute melee. During the fight Konstantinov leveled a head-butt that broke Greg Hawgood's nose. As a result of the brawl, both teams were disqualified from the tournament.

== Personal life ==
Konstantinov lives in West Bloomfield, Michigan. His wife, Irina, now lives in Florida with their daughter, Anastasia Konstantinova.

Following the passing of the "auto no-fault law" by the Michigan legislature in 2019, which was then instated in 2022, Konstantinov, and thousands of other Michiganders who had been victims of car accidents, lost coverage that had previously been guaranteed to all car accident victims. Konstantinov's family advocated for those previously entitled to care under the law to have their care reinstated, with Vladimir the face of the campaign. Prior to the law, Konstantinov had been receiving around the clock care, including assistance eating, brushing his teeth, and a monitor for when he slept.

== Career statistics ==
=== Regular season and playoffs ===
			Regular season					Playoffs
Season	Team	League	GP	G	A	Pts	PIM	GP	G	A	Pts	PIM
1984–85	CSKA Moscow	USSR	40	1	4	5	10	—	—	—	—	—
1985–86	CSKA Moscow	USSR	26	4	3	7	12	—	—	—	—	—
1986–87	CSKA Moscow	USSR	35	2	2	4	19	—	—	—	—	—
1987–88	CSKA Moscow	USSR	50	3	6	9	32	—	—	—	—	—
1988–89	CSKA Moscow	USSR	37	7	8	15	20	—	—	—	—	—
1989–90	CSKA Moscow	USSR	47	14	13	27	44	—	—	—	—	—
1990–91	CSKA Moscow	USSR	45	5	12	17	42	—	—	—	—	—
1991–92	Detroit Red Wings	NHL	79	8	25	33	172	11	0	1	1	16
1992–93	Detroit Red Wings	NHL	82	5	17	22	137	7	0	1	1	8
1993–94	Detroit Red Wings	NHL	80	12	21	33	138	7	0	2	2	4
1994–95	ESC Wedemark	GER-2	15	17	13	30	51	—	—	—	—	—
1994–95	Detroit Red Wings	NHL	47	3	11	14	101	18	1	1	2	22
1995–96	Detroit Red Wings	NHL	81	14	20	34	139	19	4	5	9	28
1996–97	Detroit Red Wings	NHL	77	5	33	38	151	20	0	4	4	29
USSR totals			280	36	48	84	179	—	—	—	—	—
NHL totals			446	47	127	174	838	82	5	14	19	107

=== International ===
Year	Team	Event	GP	G	A	Pts	PIM
1985	Soviet Union	EJC	5	1	0	1	8
1986	Soviet Union	WJC	7	2	4	6	4
1986	Soviet Union	WC	10	1	1	2	8
1987	Soviet Union	WJC	6	1	4	5	8
1989	Soviet Union	WC	8	2	1	3	2
1990	Soviet Union	WC	10	2	2	4	12
1991	Soviet Union	WC	10	0	2	2	37
Junior totals			18	4	8	12	20
Senior totals			38	5	6	11	59

== Awards and achievements ==
- NHL All-Rookie Team – 1992
- NHL Second All-Star Team – 1996
- NHL Plus/Minus Award – 1996 (+60)
- Two-time Stanley Cup champion: 1997, 1998 Detroit Red Wings

Preceded by Ron Francis	Winner of the NHL Plus/Minus Award; 1996	Succeeded by John LeClair
