= Vyacheslav Kozlov =

Russian ice hockey player (born 1972)

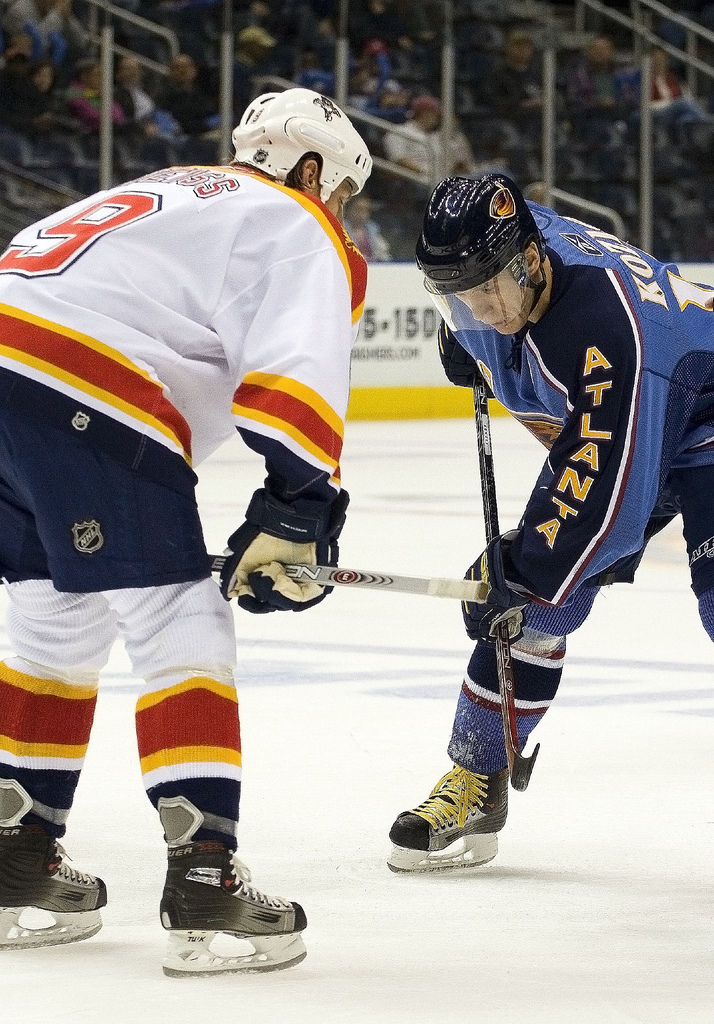
- Kozlov (right) with the Atlanta Thrashers in 2005
- Born: May 3, 1972 (age 54) Voskresensk, Russian SFSR, Soviet Union
- Height: 5 ft 10 in (178 cm)
- Weight: 190 lb (86 kg; 13 st 8 lb)
- Position: Left wing
- Shot: Left
- Played for: Khimik Voskresensk; CSKA Moscow; Detroit Red Wings; Buffalo Sabres; Atlanta Thrashers; Ak Bars Kazan; Salavat Yulaev Ufa; Dynamo Moscow; Spartak Moscow
- National team: Soviet Union and Russia
- NHL draft: 45th overall, 1990; Detroit Red Wings
- Playing career: 1987–2015

Vyacheslav Anatolevich "Slava" Kozlov (Russian: Вячеслав Анатольевич Козлов; born May 3, 1972) is a Russian former professional ice hockey left winger and current head coach of Dynamo Moscow.

Kozlov was a member of the Stanley Cup winning Detroit Red Wings teams of 1997 and 1998, and was also a member of the famed Russian Five. He also later played for the Buffalo Sabres and Atlanta Thrashers.

== Playing career ==
=== Detroit Red Wings ===
Kozlov was drafted 45th overall by the Detroit Red Wings in the 1990 NHL entry draft. Kozlov made his NHL debut on March 12, 1992, recording two assists in Detroit's 5–4 win over the St. Louis Blues. He became a regular player with Detroit in the 1993–94 NHL season. After the Red Wings acquired Igor Larionov in 1995, coach Scotty Bowman created a 5–man Russian unit (the "Russian Five") consisting of forwards Kozlov, Sergei Fedorov and Igor Larionov, and defensemen Vladimir Konstantinov and Slava Fetisov. This group helped Detroit to a Stanley Cup win in 1997. Kozlov was also a contributing member of the team during their second consecutive Stanley Cup run in 1998.

=== Buffalo Sabres ===
Kozlov played for Detroit until the summer of 2001, when he was traded to the Buffalo Sabres as part of a package for Dominik Hašek. After one injury-shortened season in Buffalo, Kozlov was traded to the Atlanta Thrashers.

=== Atlanta Thrashers ===
Kozlov served as team captain for Atlanta as part of a rotating captaincy during his first season in Atlanta until Shawn McEachern was announced as the sole captain for the rest of the 2002–03 season in February.

Since the inception of the shootout into NHL play in 2005, Kozlov has been known as the league's best scorer in the shootouts as of the end of the 2008–09 season.

Kozlov re-signed with the Thrashers on July 4, 2007, signing a three-year, $11–million contract with a no-trade clause. Kozlov played his 1,000th NHL game on December 26, 2007, against the Columbus Blue Jackets and his former Russian Five teammate, Sergei Fedorov. After scoring only 41 points during the 2007–08 season, he bounced back in 2008–09 with one of the best seasons of his career, scoring 26 goals and 76 points.

Rick Dudley announced that Atlanta would not re-sign Kozlov for the 2010-11 NHL season.

=== KHL ===
In 2010, Kozlov signed a 1-year deal with HC CSKA Moscow. In February 2011 Kozlov left CSKA to join playoff-bound Salavat Yulaev Ufa. He participated in the team's final four regular season games and all of its playoff contests. Ufa's star-studded team advanced to the KHL finals and captured the Gagarin Cup, beating Atlant Moscow Oblast 4 games to 1.

On May 19, 2011, he signed a one-year contract with HC Dynamo Moscow, with whom he won his second Gagarin Cup.

Kozlov joined HC Spartak Moscow late in the 2012–13 season, playing in just 13 games. On March 19, 2013, he signed a one-year extension with the team. He finished the 2013–14 season recording eight goals and 18 assists in 54 games.

On July 15, 2014, he signed a one-year contract with Atlant Moscow Oblast.

After the 2014–15 season, Kozlov announced his retirement after playing 28 years of ice hockey.

== Personal life ==
In October 1991, Kozlov was driving his car when a bus hit it. His passenger, fellow prospect Kirill Tarasov, was killed, and Kozlov suffered massive injuries, including a brain injury that put his playing future in doubt. After facial reconstruction surgery and lengthy rehabilitation, he was able to return to ice hockey. Kozlov and his wife, Tatyana, have three children: Nikita, Ksenia, and Alexandr. Nikita plays tennis professionally. Kozlov is the brother-in-law of former NHL player Evgeny Namestnikov and uncle of current NHL player Vladislav Namestnikov. On 11 October 2020, Vladislav signed a two-year, $4 million contract with the Detroit Red Wings, Kozlov's former team.

== International play ==
Medal record

Representing Soviet Union

Men's ice hockey

World Championships
Bronze medal – third place	1991 Finland	

World Junior Championships
Silver medal – second place	1990 Finland	
Silver medal – second place	1991 Canada	

Kozlov has participated in nine international tournaments for the Soviet Union/Russia:

- 1988 IIHF European Junior Championships
- 1989 IIHF European Junior Championships
- 1990 IIHF European Junior Championships
- 1990 World Junior Ice Hockey Championships
- 1991 World Junior Ice Hockey Championships
- 1991 Men's World Ice Hockey Championships
- 1991 Canada Cup
- 1994 Men's World Ice Hockey Championships
- 1996 World Cup of Hockey

== Career statistics ==
=== Regular season and playoffs ===
			Regular season					Playoffs
Season	Team	League	GP	G	A	Pts	PIM	GP	G	A	Pts	PIM
1987–88	Khimik Voskresensk	USSR	2	0	0	0	0	—	—	—	—	—
1988–89	Khimik Voskresensk	USSR	14	0	1	1	2	—	—	—	—	—
1989–90	Khimik Voskresensk	USSR	45	14	12	26	38	—	—	—	—	—
1990–91	Khimik Voskresensk	USSR	45	11	13	24	46	—	—	—	—	—
1991–92	CSKA Moscow	CIS	11	6	5	11	12	—	—	—	—	—
1991–92	Detroit Red Wings	NHL	7	0	2	2	2	—	—	—	—	—
1992–93	Adirondack Red Wings	AHL	45	23	36	59	54	4	1	1	2	4
1992–93	Detroit Red Wings	NHL	17	4	1	5	14	4	0	2	2	2
1993–94	Adirondack Red Wings	AHL	3	0	1	1	15	—	—	—	—	—
1993–94	Detroit Red Wings	NHL	77	34	39	73	50	7	2	5	7	12
1994–95	CSKA Moscow	IHL	10	3	4	7	14	—	—	—	—	—
1994–95	Detroit Red Wings	NHL	46	13	20	33	45	18	9	7	16	10
1995–96	Detroit Red Wings	NHL	82	36	37	73	70	19	5	7	12	10
1996–97	Detroit Red Wings	NHL	75	23	22	45	46	20	8	5	13	14
1997–98	Detroit Red Wings	NHL	80	25	27	52	46	22	6	8	14	10
1998–99	Detroit Red Wings	NHL	79	29	29	58	45	10	6	1	7	4
1999–2000	Detroit Red Wings	NHL	72	18	18	36	28	8	2	1	3	12
2000–01	Detroit Red Wings	NHL	72	20	18	38	30	6	4	1	5	2
2001–02	Buffalo Sabres	NHL	38	9	13	22	16	—	—	—	—	—
2002–03	Atlanta Thrashers	NHL	79	21	49	70	66	—	—	—	—	—
2003–04	Atlanta Thrashers	NHL	76	20	32	52	74	—	—	—	—	—
2004–05	Khimik Voskresensk	RSL	38	12	18	30	69	—	—	—	—	—
2004–05	Ak Bars Kazan	RSL	8	2	4	6	0	4	1	0	1	8
2005–06	Atlanta Thrashers	NHL	82	25	46	71	33	—	—	—	—	—
2006–07	Atlanta Thrashers	NHL	81	28	52	80	36	4	0	0	0	6
2007–08	Atlanta Thrashers	NHL	82	17	24	41	26	—	—	—	—	—
2008–09	Atlanta Thrashers	NHL	82	26	50	76	44	—	—	—	—	—
2009–10	Atlanta Thrashers	NHL	55	8	18	26	33	—	—	—	—	—
2010–11	CSKA Moscow	KHL	40	11	14	25	20	—	—	—	—	—
2010–11	Salavat Yulaev Ufa	KHL	4	1	1	2	0	21	2	7	9	14
2011–12	Dynamo Moscow	KHL	44	8	15	23	22	6	0	0	0	2
2012–13	Spartak Moscow	KHL	13	4	4	8	10	—	—	—	—	—
2013–14	Spartak Moscow	KHL	54	8	19	27	51	—	—	—	—	—
2014–15	Atlant Mytishchi	KHL	46	5	8	13	18	—	—	—	—	—
USSR totals			117	31	31	62	98	—	—	—	—	—
NHL totals			1,182	356	497	853	704	139	44	44	88	96
KHL totals			201	37	61	98	121	27	2	7	9	16

=== International ===
Year	Team	Event	Place	GP	G	A	Pts	PIM
1988	Soviet Union	EJC	3rd place, bronze medalist(s)	5	2	1	3	4
1989	Soviet Union	EJC	1st place, gold medalist(s)	6	5	7	12	8
1990	Soviet Union	EJC	2nd place, silver medalist(s)	6	9	10	19	11
1990	Soviet Union	WJC	2nd place, silver medalist(s)	7	4	7	11	0
1991	Soviet Union	WJC	2nd place, silver medalist(s)	7	3	9	12	12
1991	Soviet Union	WC	3rd place, bronze medalist(s)	10	3	4	7	10
1991	Soviet Union	CC	5th	5	1	2	3	6
1994	Russia	WC	5th	1	0	0	0	4
1996	Russia	WCH	SF	5	1	2	3	8
Junior totals				31	23	34	57	35
Senior totals				21	5	8	13	28

== Awards ==
- 2-time Stanley Cup champion (1997, 1998)
- 2-time Gagarin Cup champion (2011, 2012)
- Dan Snyder Memorial Award (2007)

== See also ==
- List of NHL players with 1,000 games played

Preceded by Niclas Hävelid	Winner of the Dan Snyder Memorial Award; 2007	Succeeded by Éric Perrin
