= Jim Lites =

American sports executive (born 1953)

- Born: James R. Lites; 1953 (age 72–73); Pentwater, Michigan, U.S.
- Education: University of Michigan (BA); Wayne State University
- Occupation: Sports executive

James R. Lites (born 1953) is an American sports executive who is CEO and alternate governor of the Dallas Stars of the NHL. He was formerly the president of Hicks Sports Marketing Group, and as such was president of the Stars and Texas Rangers of Major League Baseball, both of which were holdings of Tom Hicks, from 1993 to 2002 and from 2003 to 2007. Lites was briefly president and COO of the Phoenix Coyotes from March through December 2002. He was brought back as president and CEO of the Stars on November 18, 2011 when the club was sold to Tom Gaglardi. He has since yielded the presidency to Brad Alberts, but is still operating head of the franchise. Lites had previously been an executive in the front office of the Detroit Red Wings during the 1980s.

== Biography ==
Lites graduated from the University of Michigan with a Bachelor of Arts degree in 1975 and graduated cum laude from Wayne State University Law School in 1978. When he practiced law, he specialized in litigation and labor contract negotiations.

== Hicks Sports Marketing Group ==
The Dallas Stars had a mediocre start to the 2007–2008 NHL season, initially going 7–7–3. On November 10, 2007, after a meltdown by the team in Los Angeles (losing 6–5 in OT after leading 4–0 with 7 minutes remaining in the game), Lites dismissed general manager Doug Armstrong, and replaced him with the tandem of Brett Hull and Les Jackson.

The next day, team owner and chairman Tom Hicks reassigned Lites to head Hicks Sports Marketing Group. Lites oversees the sponsorship and marketing of the Dallas Stars and did so for Texas Rangers, Liverpool Football Club and Mesquite Championship Rodeo until they were sold.

== Controversial comments ==
On December 28, 2018, while CEO of the Dallas Stars, Lites made detrimental and controversial comments to The Athletic regarding two of the team's star players, Tyler Seguin and captain Jamie Benn. In reference to the duo, Lites was quoted as saying "They are fucking horse-shit, I don’t know how else to put it," singling out the pair after a 2–0 Dallas win over the Nashville Predators a day earlier.

Benn responded by telling the media "When there is a situation within the organization, I try to keep it within the organization and deal with it face to face", adding "I don't play for (Lites). I play for every player in this room, the coaching staff." Seguin responded by saying "Jamie and I hear the message. I think the whole team hears it. We know we have to play better and we understand that. I think our organization needs to be better. We need to lead this team to be better."

On December 30, the NHLPA commented on the issue in a press release, referring to Lites' comments as "reckless and insulting" and "unprofessional" while adding that "In professional sports, all individual players and teams go through highs and lows, but this is not how professionals handle adversity." Despite this, Lites was never disciplined by the league.

Up to that point in the 2018–19 campaign, the Stars sat fourth in the NHL's Central Division and eighth in the Western Conference with a 19-16-3 record and Seguin had 11 goals and 21 assists for 32 points while Benn had a team-leading 15 goals along with 15 assists for 30 points, respectively. The Stars would eventually finish the season as the seventh seed in the Western Conference and fourth in the Central Division with Seguin leading the team in goals (33), assists (47) and points (80) while Benn would finish with 27 goals and 26 assists for 53 points. These results led to them qualifying for the playoffs for the first time since 2016 where the team would defeat the Predators in six games in the opening round before losing in the second round in seven games by the St. Louis Blues.

Sporting positions
Preceded by Tom Schieffer	Texas Rangers President; 2001–2005	Succeeded by Michael Cramer
