= List of Detroit Red Wings records =

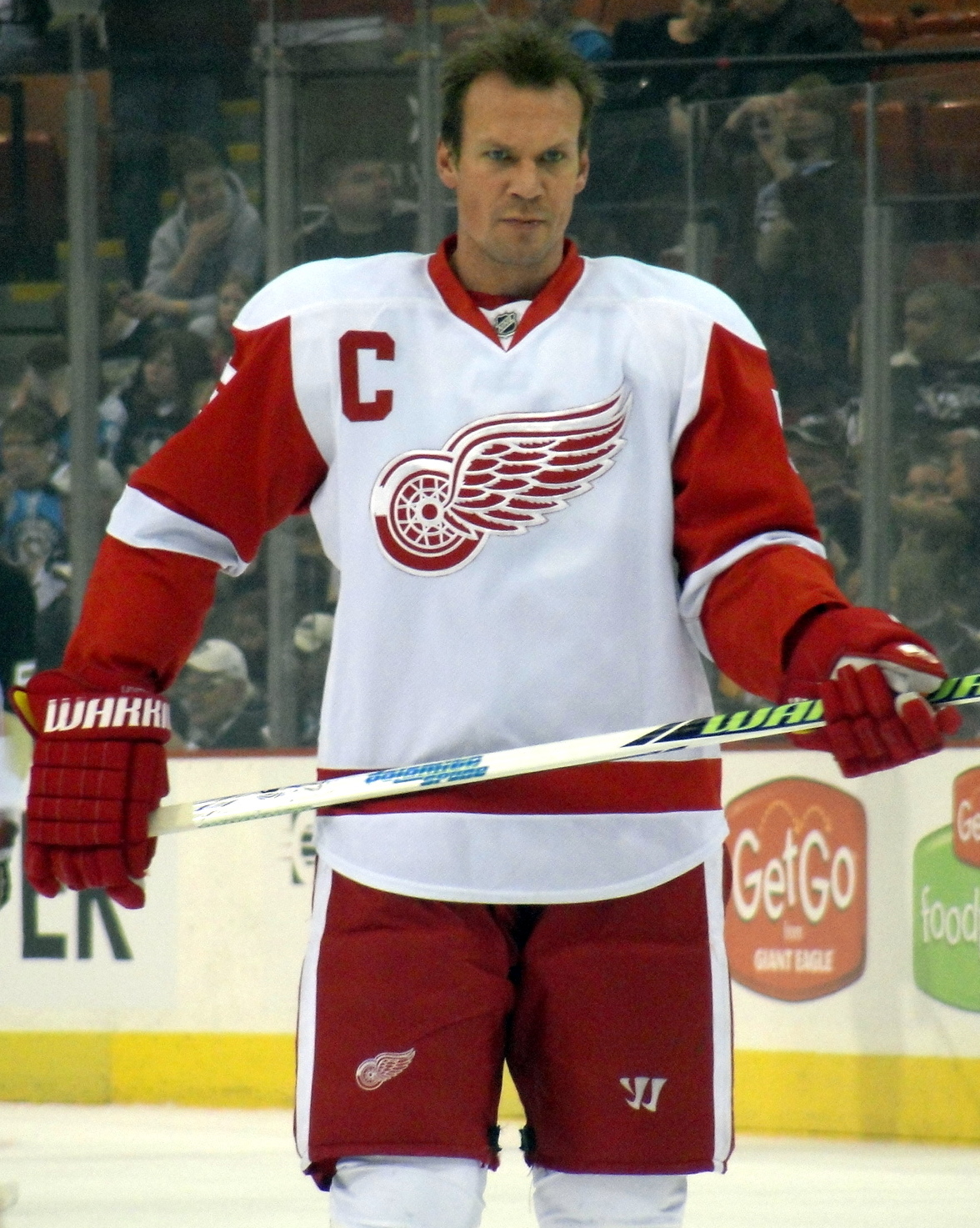
Nicklas Lidstrom holds numerous franchise records including most postseason games played, most postseason assists, and most postseason power play goals.

The Detroit Red Wings are a professional ice hockey team based in Detroit, Michigan. They are members of the Atlantic Division in the Eastern Conference of the National Hockey League (NHL) and are one of the Original Six teams of the League.

== Key ==
Key of colors, symbols, and abbreviations
Color/symbol/abbreviation	Explanation
#	NHL record, career for franchise
†	Tied for NHL record
‡	NHL record
Ref	References

== Career and single season records ==
=== Individual ===
Individual records
Record	Regular season		Postseason	
Record	Career	Season	Career	Season
Games played	1,687# Gordie Howe	84 Nicklas Lidstrom (1992–93); Steve Yzerman (1992–93); Nicklas Lidstrom (1993–94)	263# Nicklas Lidstrom	23 27 times^{[a]}
Games played, goaltender	734 Terry Sawchuk	72 Tim Cheveldae (1991–92)	110 Chris Osgood	23 Dominik Hasek (2002); Chris Osgood (2009)
Goals scored	786# Gordie Howe	65 Steve Yzerman (1988–89)	70 Steve Yzerman	13 Johan Franzen (2008); Henrik Zetterberg (2008)
Goals scored, defenseman	264 Nicklas Lidstrom	27 Reed Larson (1980–81)	54 Nicklas Lidstrom	6 Paul Coffey (1995); Nicklas Lidstrom (1998)
Goals scored, goaltender	1 Chris Osgood	1† Chris Osgood (1995–96)	—^{[b]} —	— —
Assists	1,063 Steve Yzerman	90 Steve Yzerman (1988–89)	129 Nicklas Lidstrom	18 Sergei Fedorov (1996); Steve Yzerman (1998)
Assists, defenseman	878 Nicklas Lidstrom	64 Nicklas Lidstrom (2005–06)	129# Nicklas Lidstrom	15 Niklas Kronwall (2008)
Assists, goaltender	15 Tim Cheveldae; Chris Osgood; Greg Stefan	5 Tim Cheveldae (1990–91)	4 Chris Osgood	2 Tim Cheveldae (1993); Chris Osgood (2009)
Points	1,809# Gordie Howe	155 Steve Yzerman (1988–89)	185 Steve Yzerman	27 Henrik Zetterberg (2008)
Points, defenseman	1,142 Nicklas Lidstrom	80 Nicklas Lidstrom (2005–06)	183# Nicklas Lidstrom	19 Nicklas Lidstrom (1998)
Points, goaltender	16 Chris Osgood	5 Tim Cheveldae (1990–91)	4 Chris Osgood	2 Tim Cheveldae (1993); Chris Osgood (2009)
Penalties in minutes	2,090 Bob Probert	398 Bob Probert (1987–88)	218 Gordie Howe	71 Joe Kocur (1987)
Highest plus-minus	+450 Nicklas Lidstrom	+60 Vladimir Konstantinov (1995–96)	+61‡ Nicklas Lidstrom	+17 Daniel Cleary (2009)
Lowest plus-minus	-150 Lynn Libett	-54 Randy Ladouceur (1985–86)	-15 Dino Ciccarelli	-7 Steve Yzerman (1989)
Powerplay goals	202 Steve Yzerman	21 Mickey Redmond (1973–74); Dino Ciccarelli (1992–93)	30 Nicklas Lidstrom	6 Andy Bathgate (1966); Dino Ciccarelli (1995); Dino Ciccarelli (1996); Johan Franzen (2008)
Powerplay goals, defenseman	132 Nicklas Lidstrom	11 Reed Larson (1985–86); Mathieu Schneider (2005–06)	30‡ Nicklas Lidstrom	4 Nicklas Lidstrom (2007)
Powerplay points	590 Nicklas Lidstrom	50 Nicklas Lidstrom (2005–06)	111# Nicklas Lidstrom	12 Paul Coffey (1995); Nicklas Lidstrom (2007)
Powerplay points, defenseman	590‡ Nicklas Lidstrom	50 Nicklas Lidstrom (2005–06)	111‡ Nicklas Lidstrom	12 Paul Coffey (1995); Nicklas Lidstrom (2007)
Short-handed goals	50 Steve Yzerman	10 Marcel Dionne (1974–75)	5 Sergei Fedorov; Kirk Maltby	2 Sergei Fedorov (1992); Paul Coffey (1996); Larry Murphy (1998); Brett Hull (2002); Kirk Maltby (2002); Daniel Cleary (2007); Johan Franzen (2008); Henrik Zetterberg (2008)
Short-handed points	81 Steve Yzerman	11 Steve Yzerman (1989–90); Sergei Fedorov(1993–94)	11 Sergei Fedorov; Steve Yzerman	5 Henrik Zetterberg (2008)
Game-winning goals	121 Gordie Howe	11 Sergei Fedorov (1995–96); Sergei Fedorov (2002–03)	12 Steve Yzerman; Vyacheslav Kozlov; Johan Franzen	5 Johan Franzen (2008)
Shots on goal	4,602 Steve Yzerman	388 Steve Yzerman (1988–89)	656# Nicklas Lidstrom	116‡ Henrik Zetterberg (2008)
Wins	351 Terry Sawchuk	44 Terry Sawchuk (1950–51); Terry Sawchuk (1951–52)	67 Chris Osgood	16† Mike Vernon (1997); Chris Osgood (1998); Dominik Hasek (2002)
Losses	243 Terry Sawchuk	36 Terry Sawchuk (1958–59)	37 Terry Sawchuk; Chris Osgood	8 Dominik Hasek (2007); Chris Osgood (2009)
Shutouts	85 Terry Sawchuk	12 Terry Sawchuk (1951–52); Terry Sawchuk (1953–54); Terry Sawchuk (1954–55); Glenn Hall (1955–56)	14 Chris Osgood	6 Dominik Hasek (2002)
Minutes played	43,636:00 Terry Sawchuk	4,235:44 Tim Cheveldae (1991–92)	6,554:38 Chris Osgood	1,454:42 Dominik Hasek (2002)
Goals against average	1.52^{[c]} Wilf Cude	1.37^{[c]} Dolly Dolson (1928–29)	1.32^{[d]} Normie Smith	0.63^{[d]} Terry Sawchuk (1952)
Save percentage	.920^{[c]} Petr Mrazek	.925^{[c]} Manny Legace (2002–03)	.931^{[d]} Curtis Joseph	.943^{[d]} Glen Hanlon (1987)
Shots against	14,145 Chris Osgood	1,978 Tim Cheveldae (1991–92)	2,700 Chris Osgood	637 Chris Osgood (2009)
Goals against	1,774 Terry Sawchuk	226 Tim Cheveldae (1991–92)	221 Chris Osgood	48 Chris Osgood (1998)
Saves	12,801 Chris Osgood	1,752 Tim Cheveldae (1991–92)	2,479 Chris Osgood	590 Chris Osgood (2009)
Games coached	964 Jack Adams	84† Bryan Murray (1992–93); Scotty Bowman (1993–94)	134 Scotty Bowman	23 Scotty Bowman (2002); Mike Babcock (2009)
Wins, coach	458 Mike Babcock	62‡ Scotty Bowman (1995–96)	86 Scotty Bowman	16† Scotty Bowman (1997); Scotty Bowman (1998); Scotty Bowman (2002); Mike Babcock (2008)

=== Team ===
Team records
Record	Regular season		Postseason	
Record	Most	Least	Most	Least
Games played	84 1992–93; 1993–94	44 1926–27; 1927–28; 1928–29; 1929–30; 1930–31	23 2002; 2009	2 1929; 1932
Wins	62‡ 1995–96	12 1926–27; 1937–38	16 1997; 1998; 2002; 2008	0 1929; 1932; 1958; 1970; 1985; 2003
Losses	57 1985–86	11 1994–95	9 1996	0 1952
Ties	18 1952–53; 1980–81; 1996–97	4 1926–27; 1941–42; 1966–67; 1994–95	1 1932	0 1929; 1933
Points	131 1995–96	28 1926–27	—	—
Goals for	369 1992–93	72 1928–29	76 2009	1 1932
Goals against	415 1985–86	63 1928–29	57 1988	3 1932
Penalties in minutes	2,393 1985–86	240 1938–39	- -	- -
Powerplay goals	113 1992–93	- -	23 2009	- -
Powerplay goals allowed	111 1985–86	- -	20 1988	- -
Shorthanded goals	22 1993–94	- -	7 2002	- -
Shorthanded goals allowed	15 1984–85	- -	4 1989	- -
Shutouts	13 1953–54	0 1980–81; 1981–82; 1984–85	6 2002	- -
Home wins	36 1995–96	5 1926–27	11 2009	0 1929; 1932; 1958; 1970; 1985; 2003
Road wins	31 2005–06	3 1980–81); 1931–32	8 1998; 2002	0 1929; 1932; 1958; 1970; 1985; 2003

== Single game records ==
=== Individual ===
Individual regular season single game records
Record	Player	Total	Date and opponent	Ref
Goals	Syd Howe	6	February 3, 1944 vs. New York Rangers	
Assists	Billy Taylor†	7†	March 16, 1947 at Chicago Black Hawks	
Assists, one period	Joe Carveth	4	January 23, 1944 vs. New York Rangers	
Points	Carl Liscombe; Don Grosso; Billy Taylor	7	November 5, 1942 vs. New York Rangers; February 3, 1944 vs. New York Rangers; March 16, 1947 at Chicago Black Hawks	
Points, one period	Joe Carveth; Mickey Redmond; John Ogrodnick; Steve Yzerman; Sergei Fedorov; Doug Brown; Henrik Zetterberg	4	January 23, 1944 vs. New York Rangers; October 21, 1973 vs. California Golden Seals; December 4, 1984 vs. Toronto Maple Leafs; November 17, 1990 at Toronto Maple Leafs; January 21, 1992 vs. Philadelphia; December 19, 1997 vs. New Jersey Devils; November 14, 2009 vs. Anaheim Ducks	
Power play goals	Ted Lindsay; Jimmy Carson; Tomas Holmstrom; Henrik Zetterberg	3	March 20, 1955 vs. Montreal Canadiens; December 27, 1989 vs. Toronto Maple Leafs; February 24, 2007 at Nashville Predators; February 17, 2007 at Phoenix Coyotes	
Power play goals, one period	Jimmy Carson	3	December 27, 1989 at Toronto Maple Leafs	
Shorthanded goals	Shawn Burr; Steve Yzerman; Steve Yzerman; Kirk Maltby; Darren Helm	2	January 9, 1990 vs. Minnesota North Stars; April 14, 1992 at Minnesota North Stars; April 8, 1993 at Tampa Bay Lightning; October 10, 2002 at San Jose Sharks; December 31, 2009 vs. Colorado Avalanche	
Shorthanded goals, one period	Shawn Burr	2	January 9, 1990 vs. Minnesota North Stars	
Penalty minutes	Joe Kocur	42	November 2, 1985 vs. St. Louis Blues	
Penalty minutes, one period	Joe Kocur	37	November 2, 1985 vs. St. Louis Blues	

Individual postseason single game records
Record	Player	Total	Date and opponent	Ref
Goals	Carl Liscombe; Ted Lindsay; Johan Franzen	4	April 3, 1945 vs. Boston Bruins; April 5, 1955 vs. Montreal Canadiens; May 6, 2010 vs. San Jose Sharks	
Goals, one period	Ted Lindsay; Johan Franzen	3	April 5, 1955 vs. Montreal Canadiens; May 6, 2010 vs. San Jose Sharks	
Assists	Dutch Reibel; Sergei Fedorov; Sergei Fedorov; Chris Chelios; Nicklas Lidstrom; Todd Bertuzzi	4	April 5, 1955 vs. Montreal Canadiens; April 23, 1996 vs. Winnipeg Jets; May 23, 1996 vs. Colorado Avalanche; April 27, 2002 at Vancouver Canucks; April 21, 2007 vs. Calgary; May 6, 2010 vs. San Jose Sharks	
Assists, one period	Alex Delvecchio; Vyacheslav Kozlov; Chris Chelios; Mikael Samuelsson	3	April 14, 1966 vs. Chicago Black Hawks; May 21, 1995 vs. San Jose Sharks; April 27, 2002 at Vancouver Canucks; May 22, 2007 at Anaheim Ducks	
Points	Johan Franzen	6	May 6, 2010 vs. San Jose Sharks	
Points, one period	Johan Franzen	4	May 6, 2010 vs. San Jose Sharks	
Power play goals	Syd Howe; Dino Ciccarelli; Dino Ciccarelli	3	March 23, 1939 vs. Montreal Canadiens; April 29, 1993 at Toronto Maple Leafs; May 11, 1995 at Dallas Stars	
Power play goals, one period	Syd Howe	2	March 23, 1939 vs. Montreal Canadiens	

=== Team ===
Team regular season single game records
Record	Total	Date and opponent	Ref
Goals for	15	January 23, 1944 vs. New York Rangers	
Goals against	13	January 2, 1971 at Toronto Maple Leafs	
Points	37	January 23, 1944 vs. New York Rangers	
Goals, one period	8	January 23, 1944 vs. New York Rangers	
Points, one period	22	January 23, 1944 vs. New York Rangers	
Consecutive goals scored	15‡	January 23, 1944 vs. New York Rangers	
Largest margin of victory	15‡	January 23, 1944 vs. New York Rangers	
Fastest two goals	0:05	November 24, 2007 at Columbus Blue Jackets (Pavel Datsyuk, Tomas Holmstrom); March 20, 2010 at Vancouver Canucks (Todd Bertuzzi, Pavel Datsyuk)	
Fastest three goals	0:28	Nov. 15, 1944 vs. Toronto (Hal Jackson, Steve Wochy, Don Grosso)	
Fastest four goals	1:55	Dec. 28, 1999 at Buffalo (Igor Larionov, Nicklas Lidstrom, Aaron Ward, Pat Verbeek)	
Fastest five goals	4:54	Nov. 25, 1987 vs. Winnipeg (Gerard Gallant, Adam Oates, Mel Bridgman, Jeff Sharples, Brent Ashton)	
Power play goals	6	Nov. 5, 1942; Detroit 12, N.Y. Rangers 5	
Power play goals, one period	4	Nov. 5, 1942; Detroit 12, N.Y. Rangers 5	
Power play goals against	6	January 4, 2007, at San Jose Sharks	
Shorthanded goals	3	Jan. 9, 1990 (Shawn Burr 2, Steve Yzerman), Detroit 9, Minnesota 0 Apr. 14, 1992 (Steve Yzerman 2, Sergei Fedorov), Detroit 7, Minnesota 4 Feb.11, 1994 (Sergei Fedorov, Vyacheslav Kozlov, Steve Yzerman), Detroit 6, Philadelphia 3 Mar. 22, 1996 (Steve Yzerman, Keith Primeau, Viacheslav Fetisov), Detroit 7, Colorado 0	

Team postseason single game records
Record	Total	Date and opponent	Ref
Goals for	9	April 7, 1936 vs. Toronto Maple Leafs; March 29, 1947 vs. Toronto Maple Leafs	
Goals against	9	April 14, 1942 vs. Toronto Maple Leafs; April 10, 1985 vs. Chicago Black Hawks	
Goals for, one period	6	March 29, 1947 vs. Toronto Maple Leafs, 3rd period	
Fastest two goals	0:05‡	April 11, 1965 vs. Chicago Black Hawks (Norm Ullman, Norm Ullman)	
Fastest three goals	1:30	March 29, 1947 vs. Toronto Maple Leafs (Jim Conacher, Roy Conacher, Ed Bruneteau)	
Fastest four goals	4:46	March 23, 1939 vs. Montreal Canadiens (Syd Howe, Syd Howe, Sid Abel, Eddie Wares)	
Power play goals	4	six times	
Power play goals, one period	3	five times	
Power play goals against	4	March 28, 1963 vs. Chicago Black Hawks	
Shorthanded goals	2	five times	
Penalties	33†	April 12, 1991, vs. St. Louis Blues	
Penalty minutes	152‡	April 12, 1991, vs. St. Louis Blues	

== Streaks ==
Team streaks records
Record	Total	Date(s)	Ref
Longest postseason appearance streak	25 seasons	1990-91 to 2015-16	
Longest postseason appearance drought	7 seasons	1970-71 through 1976-77	
Longest winning streak	9 games	Seven times^{[e]}	
Longest home winning streak	23 games‡	November 5, 2011 to February 19, 2012	
Longest road winning streak	12 games‡	March 1, 2006 to April 15, 2006	
Longest losing streak	14 games	February 24, 1982 to March 25, 1982	
Longest home losing streak	8 games	October 21, 2013 to November 19, 2013	
Longest road losing streak	14 games	October 19, 1966 to December 21, 1966	
Longest undefeated streak	15 games (8 wins, 7 ties)	November 27, 1952 to December 28, 1952	
Longest home undefeated streak	23 games (23 wins)	November 5, 2011 to February 19, 2012	
Longest road undefeated streak	15 games (10 wins, 5 ties)	October 18, 1951 to December 20, 1951	
Longest winless streak	19 games (18 losses, 1 tie)	February 26, 1977 to April 3, 1977	
Longest home winless streak	10 games (9 losses, 1 tie)	December 11, 1985 to January 18, 1986	
Longest road winless streak	26 games (23 losses, 3 ties)	December 15, 1976 to April 3, 1977	

== See also ==
- Ice hockey statistics
- List of NHL records (individual)
- List of NHL records (team)
- List of NHL statistical leaders

== Notes ==
- a. ^{1} Chris Chelios, Mathieu Dandenault, Kris Draper, Steve Duchesne, Sergei Fedorov, Dominik Hasek, Tomas Holmstrom, Brett Hull, Nicklas Lidstrom, Kirk Maltby, Darren McCarty, Luc Robitaille, Brendan Shanahan, and Steve Yzerman in 2002, and Daniel Cleary, Valtteri Filppula, Johan Franzen, Darren Helm, Tomas Holmstrom, Marian Hossa, Jiri Hudler, Niklas Kronwall, Brett Lebda, Chris Osgood, Mikael Samuelsson, Brad Stuart and Henrik Zetterberg in 2009.
- b. ^{1} No Red Wings goaltender has ever been credited with a goal scored in the postseason
- c. ^{1} ^{2} ^{3} ^{4} Minimum 25 games played
- d. ^{1} ^{2} ^{3} ^{4} Minimum 7 games played
- e. ^{1} Active streak
- f. ^{1} March 3–21, 1951; February 27-March 20, 1955; December 12–31, 1995; March 3–22, 1996; October 13-November 1, 2005; October 25-November 14, 2006; October 18-November 9, 2007
