= Filip Gustavsson =

Swedish ice hockey player (born 1998)

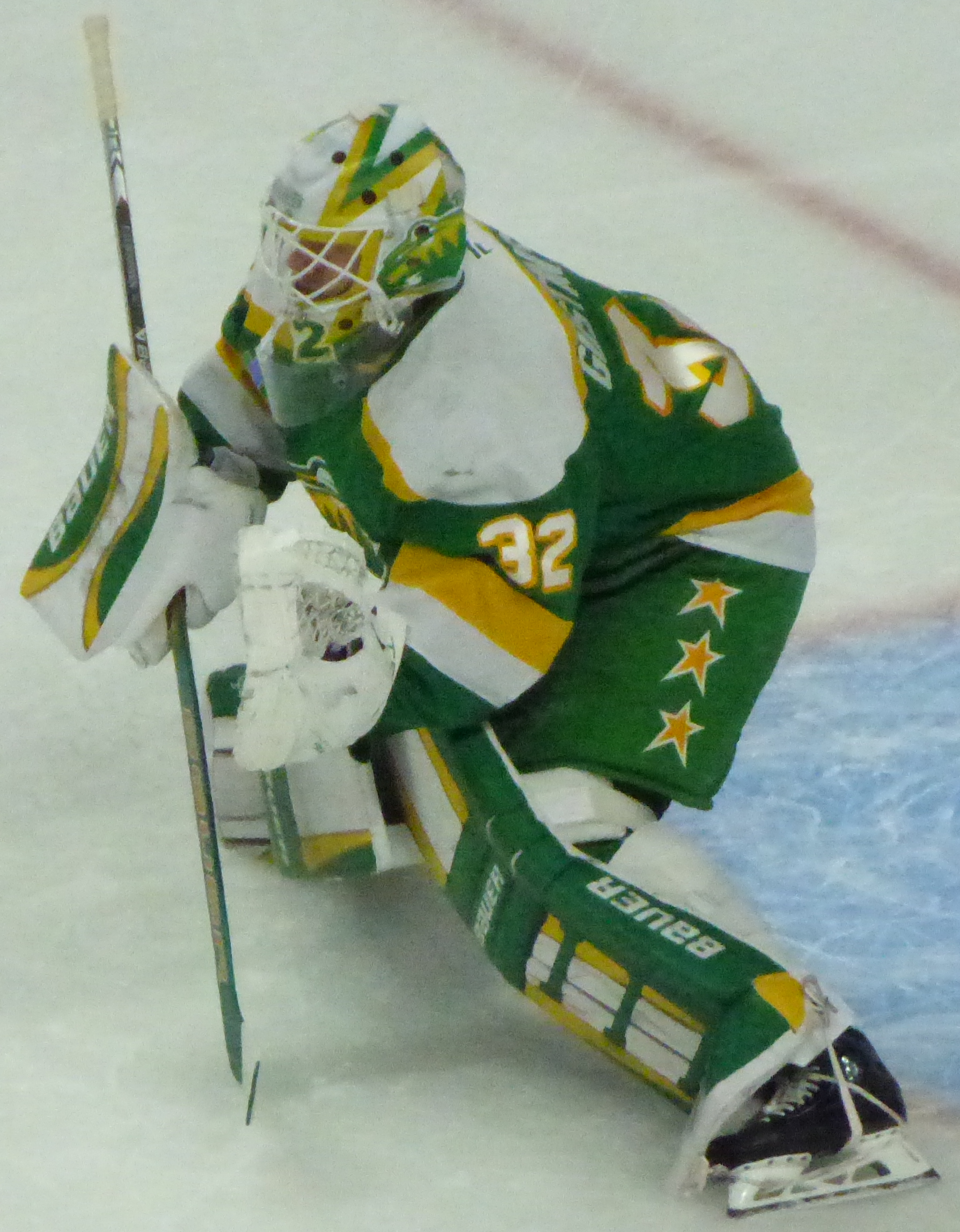
- Gustavsson playing for the Minnesota Wild in 2025.
- Born: 7 June 1998 (age 28) Skellefteå, Sweden
- Height: 6 ft 2 in (188 cm)
- Weight: 184 lb (83 kg; 13 st 2 lb)
- Position: Goaltender
- Catches: Left
- NHL team Former teams: Minnesota Wild; Luleå HF; Ottawa Senators
- National team: Sweden
- NHL draft: 55th overall, 2016; Pittsburgh Penguins
- Playing career: 2015–present

Lars Filip Dellmer Gustavsson (born 7 June 1998) is a Swedish professional ice hockey player who is a goaltender for the Minnesota Wild of the National Hockey League (NHL). He has previously played for the Ottawa Senators and Luleå HF of the Swedish Hockey League (SHL). Gustavsson was drafted 55th overall by the Pittsburgh Penguins in the 2016 NHL entry draft. He became the 15th goaltender in NHL history to score a goaltender goal on 15 October 2024, in the Wild's 4–1 victory over the St. Louis Blues.

== Playing career ==
Gustavsson made his Swedish Hockey League (SHL) debut playing with Luleå HF during the 2015–16 SHL season, on 14 November 2015.

Gustavsson was selected in the second round, 55th overall by the Pittsburgh Penguins during the 2016 NHL entry draft. On 16 June 2017, Gustavsson signed a three-year, entry-level contract with the Penguins. He continued his development on loan in Sweden with Luleå HF through the 2017–18 season.

On 23 February 2018, the Penguins traded Gustavsson to the Ottawa Senators, alongside defenceman Ian Cole, a 2018 first-round pick and a 2019 third-round pick, in exchange for forward Derick Brassard. On 23 March, Gustavsson was assigned to Ottawa's American Hockey League (AHL) affiliate, the Belleville Senators, after the conclusion of the SHL season. With the 2020–21 season delayed due to the COVID-19 pandemic in North America, Gustavsson was loaned to Södertälje SK of HockeyAllsvenskan. He went 11–7–0 in 19 appearances before returning to the Senators. On 17 March 2021, Gustavsson made his NHL debut. He entered in relief of Joey Daccord, who departed the game with an injury. Gustavsson stopped all eight shots faced in the 3–2 shootout loss to the Vancouver Canucks. He made his first career start on 22 March, stopping 35 shots in a 2–1 win over the Calgary Flames. The victory was the first of his NHL career. In the 2021–22 season Gustavsson played in 18 games with Ottawa, starting 16 of them and compiling a record of 5–12–1. He also played in 20 games with Belleville.

On 12 July 2022, Gustavsson was traded by the Senators to the Minnesota Wild in exchange for goaltender Cam Talbot. He started the season as the backup to Marc-André Fleury and got his first NHL shutout on 10 December, in a 3–0 win over the Vancouver Canucks. The Wild made the playoffs and Gustavsson made his NHL playoff debut versus Dallas Stars on 18 April 2023, in the first round of the 2023 Stanley Cup playoffs. He made 51 saves, setting the Wild franchise playoff record, in a double-overtime 3–2 win. The Wild were eliminated by the Stars in the first round. In the off-season, Gustavsson signed a three-year contract with the Wild. He again split the net with Fleury during the 2023–24 season, starting 43 games for the Wild, but the team failed to make the 2024 Stanley Cup playoffs.

The Wild entered the 2024–25 season with Fleury and Gustavsson in net, but Fleury declared this to be his last year. On 15 October 2024, Gustavsson became the 15th goaltender in NHL history to score a goaltender goal, the 10th to directly score a goal, and third to do so on a power play, in a 4–1 win over the St. Louis Blues.

On 4 October 2025, Gustavsson agreed to a five-year, $34 million contract extension to remain with the Wild through the 2030–31 season.

== International play ==
Medal record

Men's ice hockey

Representing Sweden

World Championships
Bronze medal – third place	2024 Czechia	

World Junior Championships
Silver medal – second place	2018 United States	

World U18 Championships
Silver medal – second place	2016 United States	

Gustavsson was selected to play for Sweden's junior team at the 2018 World Junior Championships. He stopped 29 of 31 shots in a 4–2 victory over the United States to get Sweden into the gold medal game in the tournament. In the gold medal game, he let in two goals as the team lost 3–1 to Canada. For his play, he was named the tournament's best goaltender. He represented Sweden at the 2024 World Championship and won a bronze medal. He saved 20 of 22 shots in the 4–2 win over Canada in the bronze medal game.

== Career statistics ==
=== Regular season and playoffs ===
			Regular season									Playoffs
Season	Team	League	GP	W	L	T/OT	MIN	GA	SO	GAA	SV%	GP	W	L	MIN	GA	SO	GAA	SV%
2014–15	Luleå HF	J20	7	0	5	0	305	20	0	3.94	.884	—	—	—	—	—	—	—	—
2015–16	Luleå HF	J20	20	8	11	0	1,155	62	0	3.22	.893	1	0	1	60	3	0	3.00	.870
2015–16	Luleå HF	SHL	6	4	2	0	359	13	0	2.17	.910	1	0	0	1	0	0	0.00	1.000
2016–17	Luleå HF	J20	6	3	3	0	373	13	0	2.09	.928	3	1	2	189	3	1	0.95	.967
2016–17	Luleå HF	SHL	15	4	10	0	845	38	0	2.70	.912	2	0	1	51	3	0	3.53	.885
2017–18	Luleå HF	J20	7	5	2	0	422	12	2	1.71	.925	—	—	—	—	—	—	—	—
2017–18	Luleå HF	SHL	22	9	11	0	1,190	41	3	2.07	.918	3	1	1	124	6	0	2.91	.895
2017–18	Belleville Senators	AHL	7	2	4	0	379	19	0	3.01	.912	—	—	—	—	—	—	—	—
2018–19	Belleville Senators	AHL	31	12	16	2	1,740	98	0	3.38	.887	—	—	—	—	—	—	—	—
2018–19	Brampton Beast	ECHL	2	0	2	0	100	9	0	5.38	.827	—	—	—	—	—	—	—	—
2019–20	Belleville Senators	AHL	24	15	6	3	1,395	75	1	3.23	.889	—	—	—	—	—	—	—	—
2020–21	Södertälje SK	Allsv	19	11	7	0	1,123	43	1	2.30	.919	—	—	—	—	—	—	—	—
2020–21	Belleville Senators	AHL	13	5	7	1	776	37	1	2.86	.910	—	—	—	—	—	—	—	—
2020–21	Ottawa Senators	NHL	9	5	1	2	472	17	0	2.16	.933	—	—	—	—	—	—	—	—
2021–22	Ottawa Senators	NHL	18	5	12	1	1,048	62	0	3.55	.892	—	—	—	—	—	—	—	—
2021–22	Belleville Senators	AHL	20	11	6	1	1,082	45	2	2.50	.915	2	0	2	155	8	0	3.11	.871
2022–23	Minnesota Wild	NHL	39	22	9	7	2,311	81	3	2.10	.931	5	2	3	309	12	0	2.33	.921
2023–24	Minnesota Wild	NHL	45	20	17	5	2,527	129	3	3.06	.899	—	—	—	—	—	—	—	—
2024–25	Minnesota Wild	NHL	58	31	19	6	3,424	146	5	2.56	.914	6	2	3	354	16	0	2.71	.914
2025–26	Minnesota Wild	NHL	50	28	15	6	2,968	133	4	2.69	.904	1	0	1	57	4	0	4.20	.818
SHL totals			43	17	23	0	2,394	92	3	2.31	.915	6	1	2	176	9	0	3.07	.893
NHL totals			219	111	74	26	12,748	568	15	2.67	.911	12	4	7	720	32	0	2.67	.911

=== International ===
Year	Team	Event	Result	GP	W	L	T	MIN	GA	SO	GAA	SV%
2016	Sweden	U18	2nd place, silver medalist(s)	5	3	1	0	289	13	0	2.70	.906
2017	Sweden	WJC	4th	1	1	0	0	60	2	0	2.00	.947
2018	Sweden	WJC	2nd place, silver medalist(s)	6	4	1	0	365	11	0	1.81	.924
2024	Sweden	WC	3rd place, bronze medalist(s)	7	6	1	0	395	14	0	2.13	.903
2025	Sweden	4NF	3rd	2	0	0	1	86	6	0	4.19	.813
2026	Sweden	OG	7th	2	1	1	0	118	5	0	2.55	.889
Junior totals				12	8	2	0	714	26	0	2.18	.926
Senior totals				11	7	2	1	599	25	0	2.50	.975
