= Nicklas Lidström =

Swedish ice hockey player (born 1970)

- Hockey Hall of Fame, 2015
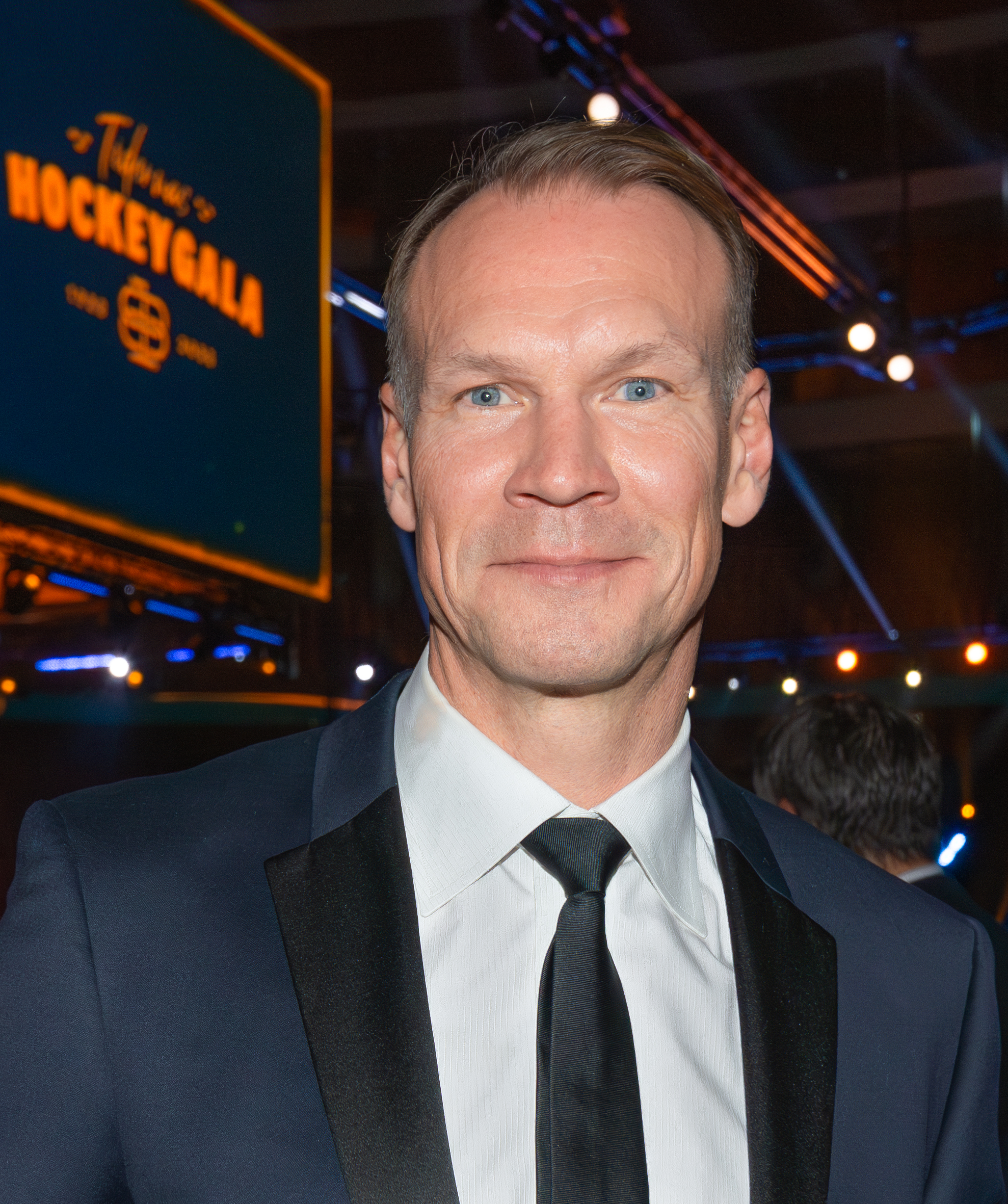
- Lidström in November 2022
- Born: 28 April 1970 (age 56) Krylbo, Sweden
- Height: 6 ft 1 in (185 cm)
- Weight: 192 lb (87 kg; 13 st 10 lb)
- Position: Defence
- Shot: Left
- Played for: Västerås IK; Detroit Red Wings
- National team: Sweden
- NHL draft: 53rd overall, 1989; Detroit Red Wings
- Playing career: 1987–2012
Medal record
Representing Sweden
Men's ice hockey
Olympic Games
Gold medal – first place	2006 Turin
World Championships
Gold medal – first place	1991 Finland
Silver medal – second place	2004 Czech Republic
Bronze medal – third place	1994 Italy

Erik Nicklas Lidström (pronounced [ˈnɪ̌kːlas ˈlîːdstrœm]; born 28 April 1970) is a Swedish former professional ice hockey defenceman and current vice president of hockey operations for the Detroit Red Wings. He played 20 seasons in the National Hockey League (NHL) for the Detroit Red Wings from 1991 to 2012, where he played in six Stanley Cup Finals, winning four championships, and captained the team for the final six seasons of his career. He is widely regarded as one of the greatest defencemen in NHL history and nicknamed "the Perfect Human".

Over his 20 NHL seasons, Lidström won four Stanley Cup championships, seven James Norris Memorial Trophies (awarded to the NHL's top defenceman), named to twelve NHL All-Star teams (ten First Team and two Second Team selections), was voted into 12 NHL All-Star Games, and received one Conn Smythe Trophy (the first European to win the trophy) as the playoffs most valuable player. The Red Wings never missed the playoffs during his career, tied with Larry Robinson for the longest streak of playoff appearances for a player in league history. Lidström was the first European-born-and-trained captain of a Stanley Cup-winning team. Lidström is also the all-time leader in games played with a single NHL team by a European-born player.

Lidström was inducted into the IIHF Hall of Fame in 2014. He was inducted into the Hockey Hall of Fame on 9 November 2015. In 2017, Lidström was named one of the "100 Greatest NHL Players" in history.

== Playing career ==
Widely considered one of the greatest defencemen of all time, Lidström was awarded the James Norris Memorial Trophy seven times, a feat matched by only one other player (Doug Harvey) and exceeded only by Bobby Orr (who won the trophy eight times). Lidström was nominated for the Norris a total of 12 times in his last 14 seasons in the NHL, the first three times finishing as the runner-up (1998 to 2000), and won the award in seven of his last ten (2004–05 had no winner due to the NHL lockout), including three consecutive awards from 2001 to 2003 to become the first defenceman since Orr to win three straight. In his final 16 seasons (beginning in 1995–96), he finished no lower than sixth place in Norris Trophy voting. Lidström was also named to twelve NHL All-Star Teams, including ten First Team and two Second Team selections.

Lidström played his entire 20-year NHL career with the Detroit Red Wings, finishing his career with the second-most Stanley Cup playoff games played in NHL history, with 263 appearances (Chris Chelios ranks first with 266). He was a member of four Stanley Cup-winning teams, in 1996–97, 1997–98, 2001–02 and 2007–08. Save for the cancelled 2004–05 season lockout year, Lidström played in the playoffs for an NHL record 20 consecutive seasons (an honour he shares with Larry Robinson).

Known for his durability, Lidström consistently ranked amongst the top in the NHL in ice time per game. He averaged 28:07 minutes in the 2005–06 season, a career-high. In the 2003–04 season, he played in the 1,000th game of his career, having missed only 17 games in 12 1/2 seasons (1994–95 was shortened to 48 games instead of the usual 82 by a labour dispute).

At the conclusion of the 2002 Stanley Cup playoffs, Lidström was named the winner of the Conn Smythe Trophy as most valuable player in the postseason, becoming the first European to ever be awarded the honor.

=== Early career ===
Lidström began his career in Avesta, Sweden, playing with Skogsbo SK, before moving on to play with VIK Västerås HK of the Swedish Elitserien. In three seasons with the team, he played 103 games, scoring 12 goals and 30 assists.

=== NHL career (1991–2012) ===
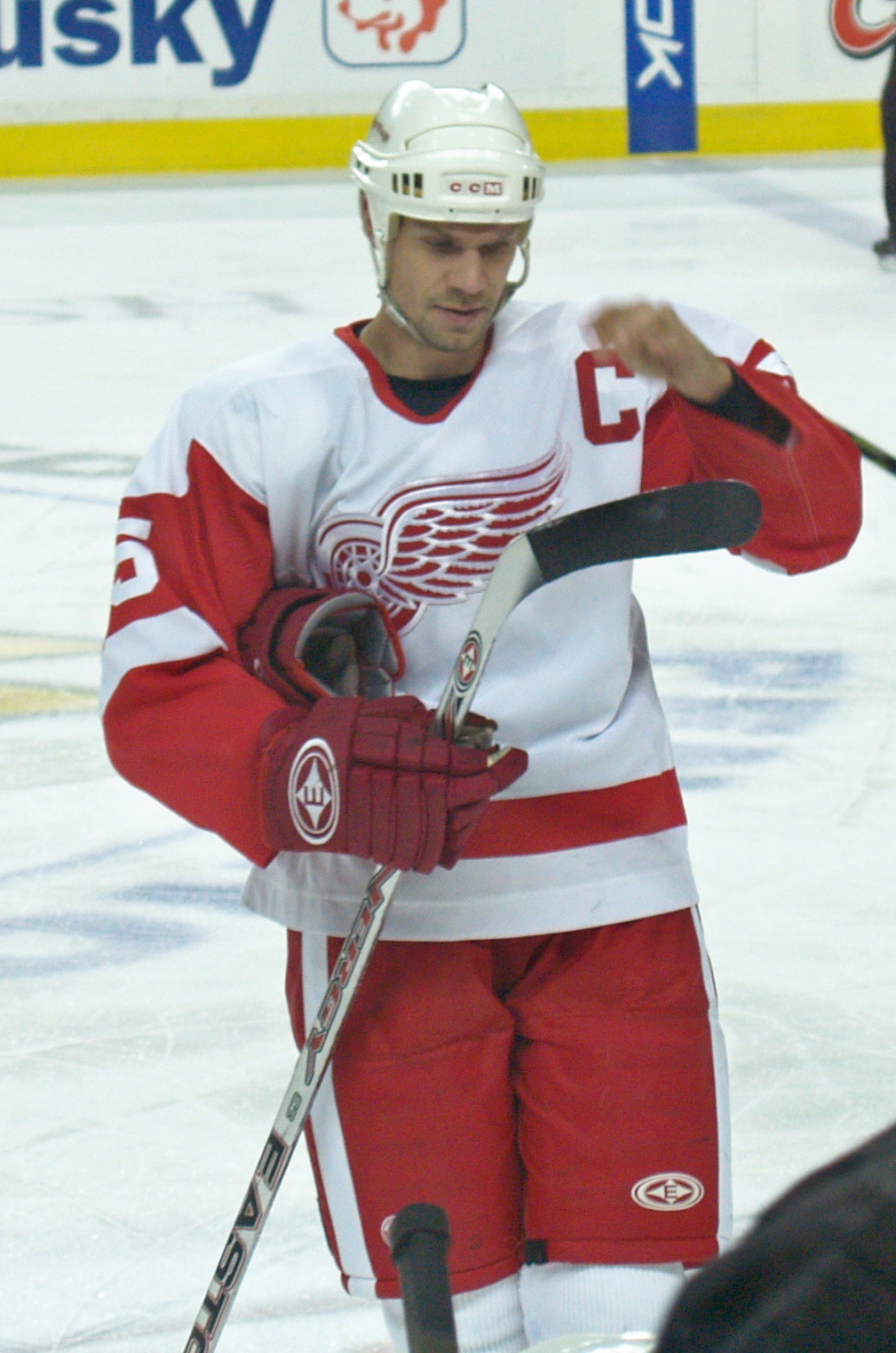
Lidström in November 2006, the 2006–07 season was his first season as captain of the Red Wings

Drafted by the Detroit Red Wings 53rd overall in the 1989 NHL entry draft, Lidström joined the team in the 1991–92 season, though he returned to play for Västerås IK for a brief period during the 1994–95 NHL lockout. Lidström scored 60 points in his rookie season, finishing second to Pavel Bure in voting for that year's Calder Trophy. He was selected to the 1992 NHL All-Rookie Team, along with fellow Red Wings defenceman Vladimir Konstantinov.

Lidström was set to make $10 million during the 2005–06 season. However, due to the new terms of the NHL Collective Bargaining Agreement that was implemented during the 2004–05 season, salaries on pre-existing contracts were reduced by 24%, which lowered his compensation to $7.6 million. That season, he posted a career-high 64 assists and 16 goals to for 80 points.

On 30 June 2006, it was announced that Lidström had signed a two-year, $15.2 million contract extension with the Red Wings. Instead of seeking more money elsewhere for a defenceman of his caliber, Lidström decided to remain with Detroit for the same annual salary as he earned during the 2005–06 season.

Lidström had been an alternate captain of the Red Wings since the 1997–98 season. Long-time Red Wings captain Steve Yzerman retired after Detroit was eliminated in the first round, despite winning the President's Trophy for the season, by the eventual Western Conference champion Edmonton Oilers in six games. To replace Yzerman, Lidström was named captain, an honor made more special by the fact that he became the first European captain in franchise history. In his first year of captaincy, Lidström led the Red Wings to the Western Conference Finals, but lost to eventual Stanley Cup champions, the Anaheim Ducks, in six games. In the off-season, Lidström joined an elite group by capturing the Norris Trophy as the NHL's outstanding defenceman for the fifth time. Lidström became the fourth defenceman in NHL history with as many as five Norris Trophy wins, joining Hockey Hall of Famers Bobby Orr (eight), Doug Harvey (seven) and Ray Bourque (five).

Near the beginning of the 2007–08 season, in an 8 October win against the Edmonton Oilers, Lidström registered two assists to surpass Peter Forsberg as the second-highest scoring Swedish-born NHL player of all time. Accordingly, he trails only Mats Sundin (as of the end of the 2011–12 season, Lidström has 1,142 points to Sundin's 1,349). Later in the season, on 26 December, Lidström signed a contract extension through the 2009–10 season. Several months later, on 3 April 2008, he assisted on a goal by Johan Franzén to tie Luc Robitaille at 42nd in the all-time NHL assists, with 726.

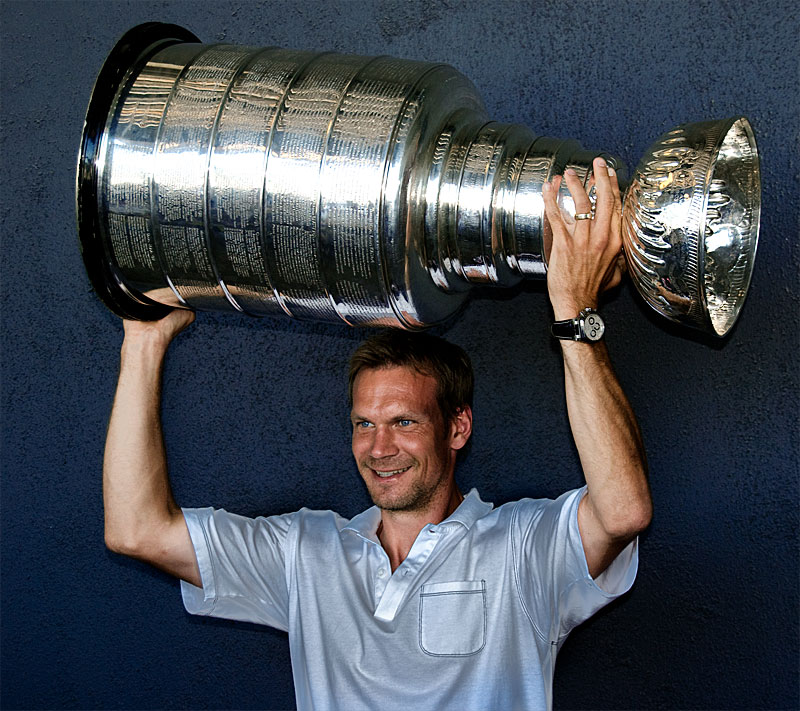
Lidström with the Stanley Cup in July 2008. He won the Stanley Cup four times in his career.

Entering the playoffs as the Presidents' Trophy winners for the highest team point total again during the regular season, the Red Wings met the Pittsburgh Penguins in the 2008 Stanley Cup Final. Despite a game five, triple-overtime victory by the Penguins to stave off elimination and prevent a Stanley Cup win on home ice by tying the game with less than a minute left, Lidström and the Red Wings defeated Pittsburgh in game six to capture the Stanley Cup. Lidström and teammates Tomas Holmstrom, Kris Draper, Kirk Maltby, and Darren McCarty, were the only players to be part of all four Stanley Cup-winning Red Wings teams between 1997 to 2008. In doing so, also Lidström became the first European-born-and-trained captain to win the Stanley Cup. In 1934, Charlie Gardiner, a goaltender born in Scotland, had captained the Chicago Black Hawks to win the Stanley Cup and in 1938, Johnny Gottselig, a left-winger born in Russia, also captained Chicago to a championship, but both players were trained in Canada. Just over one week after winning his fourth Stanley Cup in 11 seasons, on 12 June, Lidström won the Norris Trophy for the third-straight season and the sixth time in seven seasons.

As the Red Wings opened the 2008–09 pre-season against the Montreal Canadiens, Lidström suffered a broken nose as a shot from Canadiens forward Chris Higgins ricocheted and hit him in the face. From then on, he began wearing a visor. He returned in time for the regular season and was selected to the 2009 NHL All-Star Game in Montreal. However, in the midst of dealing with tendinitis that had been bothering him all season, Lidström chose to sit out All-Star weekend, along with teammate Pavel Datsyuk. Consequently, Lidström and Datsyuk were both suspended one game by the NHL due to League policy for missing the All-Star Game without significant injury. On 22 May, in game three of the third round of the 2009 playoffs against the Chicago Blackhawks, Lidström suffered a testicle injury as a result of getting speared in the groin area by Blackhawks' winger Patrick Sharp, requiring surgery to remove the damaged testicle. He would miss the last two games of the series, which the Red Wings would win in five games for a second consecutive appearance, as the defending champions, in the Stanley Cup Final, which was a rematch of the previous year's final against the Penguins. Lidström was able to return in time for the series which was his second consecutive and second consecutive overall, and sixth appearance altogether, in a Cup Final. However, unlike the previous year, the Red Wings would lose the series in seven games, despite having a 3–2 series lead, which meant two chances to win, the first in Pittsburgh again like in the previous year's game six, and game seven in Detroit, which prevented him from a second consecutive Stanley Cup for the second time in his career and fifth Stanley Cup altogether. Lidström was unable to tie game seven and sent it into overtime despite having the puck with an open net with seconds left after Penguins goaltender Marc-Andre Fleury leapt just in time to block the shot.

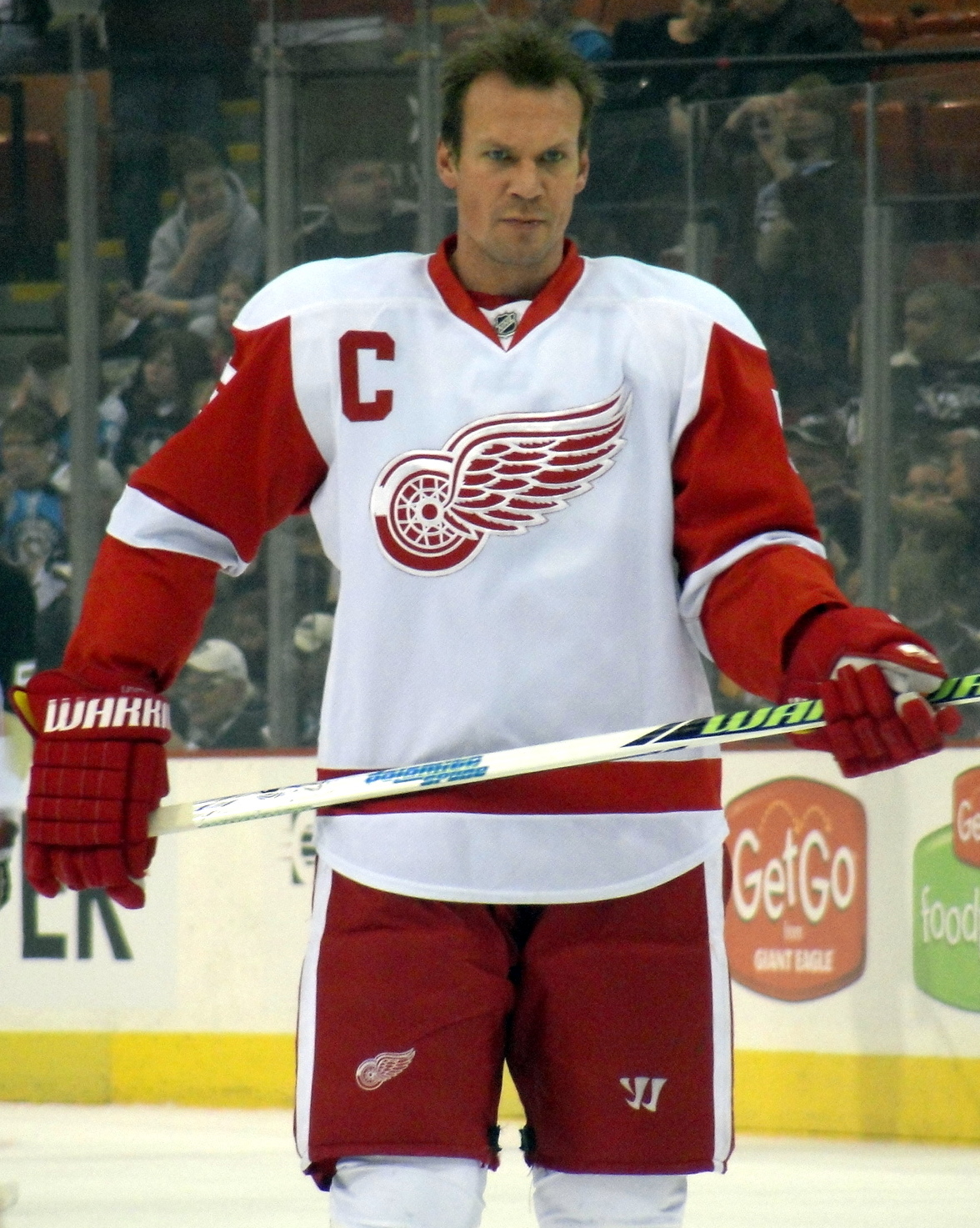
Lidström with the Red Wings in January 2010

The Red Wings opened the 2009–10 season in Stockholm, Sweden. During the team's trip in Sweden, Lidström was honored by his home county, Dalarna, as an Ambassador of Honor. On 15 October 2009, in a game against the Los Angeles Kings, Lidström became the first European-born defenceman to reach 1,000 points after recording two assists in the game. He is the fourth player to score 1,000 points as a Red Wing (after Gordie Howe, Alex Delvecchio and Steve Yzerman), and the eighth defenceman to do so in the history of the NHL. On 5 March 2010, Lidström earned his 800th career assist. Also during the 2009–10 season, Lidström played in his 1,395th game (finishing the season with 1,412), setting an all-time record for NHL games played by a player born in Europe; earlier in the season, Lidström had passed Teppo Numminen for games played by a player trained in Europe. Lidström is also second all-time in games played in a Red Wing uniform, behind only Howe. Despite the team under performing due to key injuries to key players, especially at the beginning of the season, the team was still able to make the Stanley Cup playoffs. On 23 April, Lidström played in his 237th career playoff game, moving past Mark Messier into sole possession of third place on the NHL's all-time list, behind goaltender; Patrick Roy with 247, and former teammate Chris Chelios in first with 266. In the same game, he had an assist to tie Al MacInnis (121) for the third-most assists in the post-season by a defenceman (Ray Bourque 139; Paul Coffey 137). On 27 April, a day before his 40th birthday, Lidström had three points in a game seven win over the Phoenix Coyotes in the first round of the 2010 playoffs, pushing his active playoff points lead to 171 points, and tying him for 17th on the all-time playoff points list with fellow countryman Peter Forsberg. After defeating the Coyotes in game seven to take the series in seven games, the Red Wings would go on to lose in the second round in five games against the San Jose Sharks.

As of the end of the 2009–10 season, Lidström has missed only 28 of a possible 1,440 regular-season team games (one due to suspension).

After contemplating retirement, Lidström agreed on a one-year contract with the Red Wings on 1 June 2010; the contract paid him slightly over $6 million. On 15 December 2010, Lidström recorded his first career hat-trick, at 40 years of age, against the St. Louis Blues, sealing a 5–2 Detroit victory. After the game, he was asked how it feels to score his first hat-trick, responding, "It feels great, I've never in my life been able to notch three goals in a game." The hat-trick made him the oldest player in NHL history to record his first hat-trick (previously held by Scott Mellanby at 36 years of age), and the oldest defenceman in NHL history to record a hat-trick (previously held by Mathieu Schneider at 37 years of age). On 18 January 2011, Lidström was named a team captain in the 2011 NHL All-Star Game in Raleigh, North Carolina. His team won by a final score of 11–10 over Team Staal, captained by Eric Staal of the Carolina Hurricanes. Lidström finished +7 with one assist.

On 20 June 2011, after briefly contemplating retirement yet again, Lidström signed a one-year contract after being happy with his proformance during the previous season (he finished however with a minus -2 plus/minus rating, the first and only time he finished a season with a minus rating) given his age at the time, worth $6.2 million with Detroit, the same amount he had been paid the previous season. On 23 June 2011, he won his seventh Norris Trophy, tying with Doug Harvey and remaining one behind Bobby Orr for most Norris Trophies. This was only the third time in history that a player with a negative plus/minus rating managed to win a Norris Trophy.

On 22 October 2011, in a game against the Washington Capitals, Lidström became the 14th player in the history of the NHL to play 1,500 games. He is the first player not being born in North America, and therefore the first Swedish and European player, as well as the first player to accomplish this in his 20th NHL season. Lidström played in his 1,550th game on 12 February 2012, against the Philadelphia Flyers, surpassing Alex Delvecchio's previous Red Wing record of 1,549 games. This also makes him the NHL player who has played the most games while always playing for the same NHL team (Gordie Howe played more games, 1,687, with the Red Wings, but also played for the Hartford Whalers for one season). In this regard, Lidström joins former Red Wings Alex Delvecchio and former teammate and captain Steve Yzerman as the only three players with over 1,500 games having played exclusively for just one team throughout their careers.

=== Retirement ===
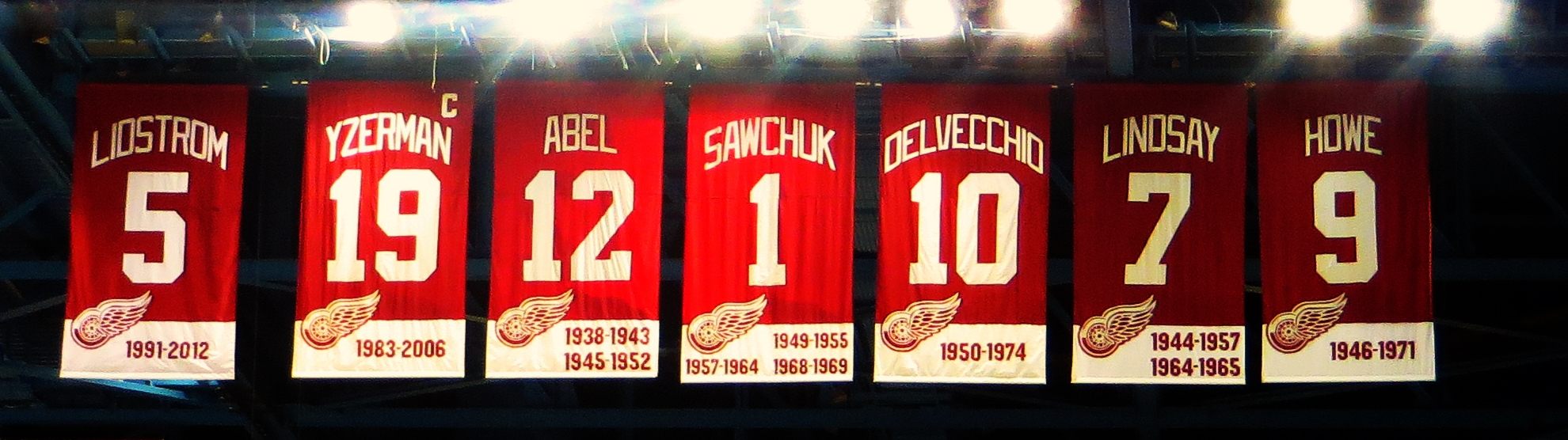
Lidström's #5 banner hanging at Joe Louis Arena.

On 31 May 2012, Lidström announced his retirement from the NHL via a press conference with Red Wings Owner Mike Ilitch and General Manager Ken Holland present, after finishing the season with his lowest point total in a full season in his career. The night before, he told the Swedish tabloid Expressen, "I came to the decision last week and I informed our general manager, Ken Holland." Discussing Lidström's retirement, former teammate Steve Yzerman described Lidström as "one of the all-time best defencemen to ever play." Former teammate and fellow Norris Trophy winning defenseman Paul Coffey said, "He was an incredible player" while Chris Chelios said, "There's been guys who are great players, but no one's better than Nick. As good? Yes. But this is as big as it gets. He's one of the best athletes ever and...if you're going to talk about someone who's perfect, Nick's pretty darn close to being perfect." Washington Capitals defenceman John Carlson described Lidström as "one of the game's all-time greats on and off the ice." Ken Holland stated his belief that Lidström was "the most valuable player of his era."

The following weekend, on 3 June 2012, Lidström and his wife took out a full-page ad giving thanks to the city of Detroit for making his family feel at home for the past 21 years. On 8 July 2012, Lidström was named a scout for the Red Wings.

On 28 February 2014, Lidström was inducted into the Michigan Sports Hall of Fame.

During the 2013–14 season, Lidström had his number 5 jersey retired by the Red Wings. Initially, ceremonies were planned for the previous season, on 5 February 2013 — however, the lockout had made it hard to determine when Lidström would be able to attend the ceremony. The Red Wings officially retired his number on 6 March 2014, in a pre-game ceremony at Joe Louis Arena.

== International play ==
Representing Sweden, Lidström won the World Championship in 1991. At the 2006 Winter Olympics, Lidström was a major factor in Sweden's win over Finland in the finals, scoring the gold medal-clinching goal, thus earning him a spot on the Olympic All-Star team. He also became the 17th member of the Triple Gold Club. The Hockey News selected Lidström as the "Best European-trained player ever in the NHL." The Sporting News and Sports Illustrated selected Lidström as the "NHL Player of the Decade."

Prior to his NHL career, Lidström competed in one European Junior Championships in 1988, one World Junior Championship in 1990 and one Canada Cup in 1991 for Sweden.

Prior to his rookie season with the Red Wings, he earned his first gold medal with Sweden at the 1991 World Championships. Three years later, he competed in the 1994 World Championships in Italy and won a bronze medal. Two years later, he participated in the inaugural 1996 World Cup of Hockey (successor of the Canada Cup) and contributed three points in four games. He made his Olympic debut with Sweden at the 1998 Winter Olympics in Nagano, Japan.

Four years later was his next international appearance, playing in his second Olympics at the 2002 Winter Olympics in Salt Lake City, where Sweden was upset by Belarus in the quarter-final after being heavy favourites in the round-robin. Lidström made his third World Championships appearance in 2004, but only appeared in two games. That summer, he also competed in the 2004 World Cup of Hockey, where he scored one goal.

In the 2006 Winter Olympics in Turin, Italy, Lidström helped Sweden avenge their quarter-final upset to Belarus in Salt Lake City, scoring the game winning goal in the gold medal game against Finland. In doing so, Lidström became a member of the Triple Gold Club, adding an Olympic gold medal to go with his previous Stanley Cups with Detroit and his World Championship gold medal in 1991. Lidström was also selected to the 2010 Olympic All-Star team.

Lidström also played for Sweden in the 2010 Winter Olympics in Vancouver, serving as team captain in what would be his final Olympic appearance. Lidström announced his retirement from Olympic competition following Sweden's loss to Slovakia.

== Personal life ==
Growing up, Lidström idolized trailblazing defenceman Börje Salming, whom he considers to be his hero. In November 2023, Lidström was the recipient of the inaugural Börje Salming Courage Award, which is given to the European NHL alumnus who has been a positive influence in their community and best embodies Salming's legacy.

Lidström is married to Annika, with whom he has four children. All four sons play high-level hockey: Kevin (born 1994), is currently a defenceman for Swedish Division 1 team SK Lejon; Adam (born 1996) also plays in Division 1 with Enköpings SK; Samuel (born in 2000) plays on Elitettan team Köping HC and Lucas (born in 2003) also plays for VIK Västerås HK on its U16 team.

Lidström was featured on an episode of NHL 36.

In October 2019, Lidström released his authorized biography in North America titled Nicklas Lidstrom: The Pursuit of Perfection.

== Career statistics ==
=== Regular season and playoffs ===
			Regular season					Playoffs
Season	Team	League	GP	G	A	Pts	PIM	GP	G	A	Pts	PIM
1987–88	Västerås IK	SWE U20	—	—	—	—	—	—	—	—	—	—
1987–88	Västerås IK	SWE.2	3	0	0	0	0	5	0	0	0	6
1988–89	Västerås IK	SEL	20	0	2	2	4	—	—	—	—	—
1988–89	Västerås IK	Allsv	15	1	4	5	0	—	—	—	—	—
1989–90	Västerås IK	SEL	39	8	8	16	14	2	0	1	1	2
1990–91	Västerås IK	SEL	38	4	19	23	2	4	0	0	0	4
1991–92	Detroit Red Wings	NHL	80	11	49	60	22	11	1	2	3	0
1992–93	Detroit Red Wings	NHL	84	7	34	41	28	7	1	0	1	0
1993–94	Detroit Red Wings	NHL	84	10	46	56	26	7	3	2	5	0
1994–95	Västerås IK	SEL	13	2	10	12	4	—	—	—	—	—
1994–95	Detroit Red Wings	NHL	43	10	16	26	6	18	4	12	16	8
1995–96	Detroit Red Wings	NHL	81	17	50	67	20	19	5	9	14	10
1996–97	Detroit Red Wings	NHL	79	15	42	57	30	20	2	6	8	2
1997–98	Detroit Red Wings	NHL	80	17	42	59	18	22	6	13	19	8
1998–99	Detroit Red Wings	NHL	81	14	43	57	14	10	2	9	11	4
1999–00	Detroit Red Wings	NHL	81	20	53	73	18	9	2	4	6	4
2000–01	Detroit Red Wings	NHL	82	15	56	71	18	6	1	7	8	0
2001–02	Detroit Red Wings	NHL	78	9	50	59	20	23	5	11	16	2
2002–03	Detroit Red Wings	NHL	82	18	44	62	38	4	0	2	2	0
2003–04	Detroit Red Wings	NHL	81	10	28	38	18	12	2	5	7	4
2005–06	Detroit Red Wings	NHL	80	16	64	80	50	6	1	1	2	2
2006–07	Detroit Red Wings	NHL	80	13	49	62	46	18	4	14	18	6
2007–08	Detroit Red Wings	NHL	76	10	60	70	40	22	3	10	13	14
2008–09	Detroit Red Wings	NHL	78	16	43	59	30	21	4	12	16	6
2009–10	Detroit Red Wings	NHL	82	9	40	49	24	12	4	6	10	4
2010–11	Detroit Red Wings	NHL	82	16	46	62	20	11	4	4	8	4
2011–12	Detroit Red Wings	NHL	70	11	23	34	28	5	0	0	0	0
SEL totals			110	14	39	53	32	6	0	1	1	6
NHL totals			1,564	264	878	1,142	514	263	54	129	183	76

=== International ===
Year	Team	Event	GP	G	A	Pts	PIM
1988	Sweden	EJC	6	1	0	1	0
1990	Sweden	WJC	7	3	3	6	2
1991	Sweden	WC	10	3	3	6	4
1991	Sweden	CC	6	1	1	2	4
1994	Sweden	WC	4	1	0	1	2
1996	Sweden	WCH	4	2	1	3	0
1998	Sweden	OLY	4	1	1	2	2
2002	Sweden	OLY	4	1	5	6	0
2004	Sweden	WC	2	0	1	1	0
2004	Sweden	WCH	4	1	0	1	2
2006	Sweden	OLY	8	2	4	6	2
2010	Sweden	OLY	4	0	0	0	0
Junior totals			13	4	3	7	2
Senior totals			50	12	16	28	18

== Awards ==
- NHL All-Rookie Team (1992).
- 4x Stanley Cup winner (1997, 1998, 2002, and 2008).
- 12x NHL All-Star Game (1996, 1998, 1999, 2000, 2001, 2002, 2003, 2004, 2007, 2008, 2009*, 2011).
- 10x NHL first All-Star team member (1998, 1999, 2000, 2001, 2002, 2003, 2006, 2007, 2008, 2011).
- 2x NHL Second All-Star Team member (2009, 2010).
- 7x Norris Trophy winner (2001, 2002, 2003, 2006, 2007, 2008, 2011).
- Conn Smythe Trophy winner (2002).
- NHL 2000s All-Decade First Team (2009)
- Olympic All-Star team (2006).
- Member of the Triple Gold Club.
- 2x Viking Award winner (2000 and 2006).
- Inducted into the Michigan Sports Hall of Fame – 2014
- Detroit Red Wings #5 retired on 6 March 2014
- Inducted into the IIHF Hall of Fame – 2014
- Inducted into the Hockey Hall of Fame – 2015
- Introduced into the IIHF All-Time Sweden Team - 2020

*did not attend

== Records ==
All records are as of the end of the 2011–12 regular season unless otherwise noted.

=== NHL ===
- First European-born and trained Norris Trophy winner (2000–01).
- First European-born and trained Conn Smythe Trophy winner (2001–02).
- Fourth defenceman (and first European-born and trained defenceman) in NHL to win James Norris Memorial Trophy three years running (2001–2003, 2006–2008), and third seven-time Norris Trophy winner.
- First European-born and trained captain of a Stanley Cup-winning team (2008).
- First European-born and trained defenceman to reach 1,000 points.
- Most regular-season games played by a player born in Europe, any position (1,564).
- Most regular-season games played by a player in a career spent with only one team (1,564).
- Most regular-season wins played in (900).
- Most postseason games played with single franchise, career (263)
- Most postseason assists by defenceman with single franchise, career (129)
- Most postseason points by defenceman with single franchise, career (183)
- Highest postseason plus/minus, career (+61)
- Most postseason power-play goals by defenceman, career (30)
- Most postseason shots on goal with single franchise, career (656)
- Oldest player to record his first hat-trick (40 years, 210 days)
- Oldest defenceman to record a hat-trick (40 years, 210 days)
- Oldest Norris Trophy winner (41 years, 57 days) (2010–2011)
- Oldest defenceman to score in a game seven (39 years, 364 days)

=== Detroit Red Wings ===
- Points by a defenceman, season (2005–06, 80).
- Assists by a defenceman, season (2005–06, 64).
- Postseason goals by a defenceman, career (54).
- Post-season power-play goals, career (30).
- Power play goals by a defenceman, career (132).
- Postseason points by a defenceman, career (183).
- Postseason assists, career (129).
- Postseason games played, career (263).
- Games played by a defenceman, career (1,564).
- Goals, assists, and points by a defenceman, career (264, 878, and 1142).
- Goals in a single postseason by a defenceman (1998, 6).
- Best postseason plus/minus, career (+61).
- Best regular season plus/minus, career (+450).

== See also ==
- List of NHL players with 1,000 points
- List of NHL players with 1,000 games played
- List of Detroit Red Wings award winners
- List of Detroit Red Wings draft picks
- List of Detroit Red Wings records

Awards and achievements
Preceded by Patrick Roy	Conn Smythe Trophy winner 2002	Succeeded by Jean-Sébastien Giguère
Preceded by Chris Pronger; Scott Niedermayer; Duncan Keith	James Norris Memorial Trophy winner 2001, 2002, 2003; 2006, 2007, 2008; 2011	Succeeded by Scott Niedermayer; Zdeno Chára; Erik Karlsson
Preceded by Peter Forsberg; Markus Näslund	Viking Award winner 2000; 2006	Succeeded by Markus Näslund; Henrik Zetterberg
Sporting positions
Preceded by Steve Yzerman	Detroit Red Wings captain 2006–12	Succeeded by Henrik Zetterberg
