= Chris Osgood =

Canadian ice hockey player (born 1972)

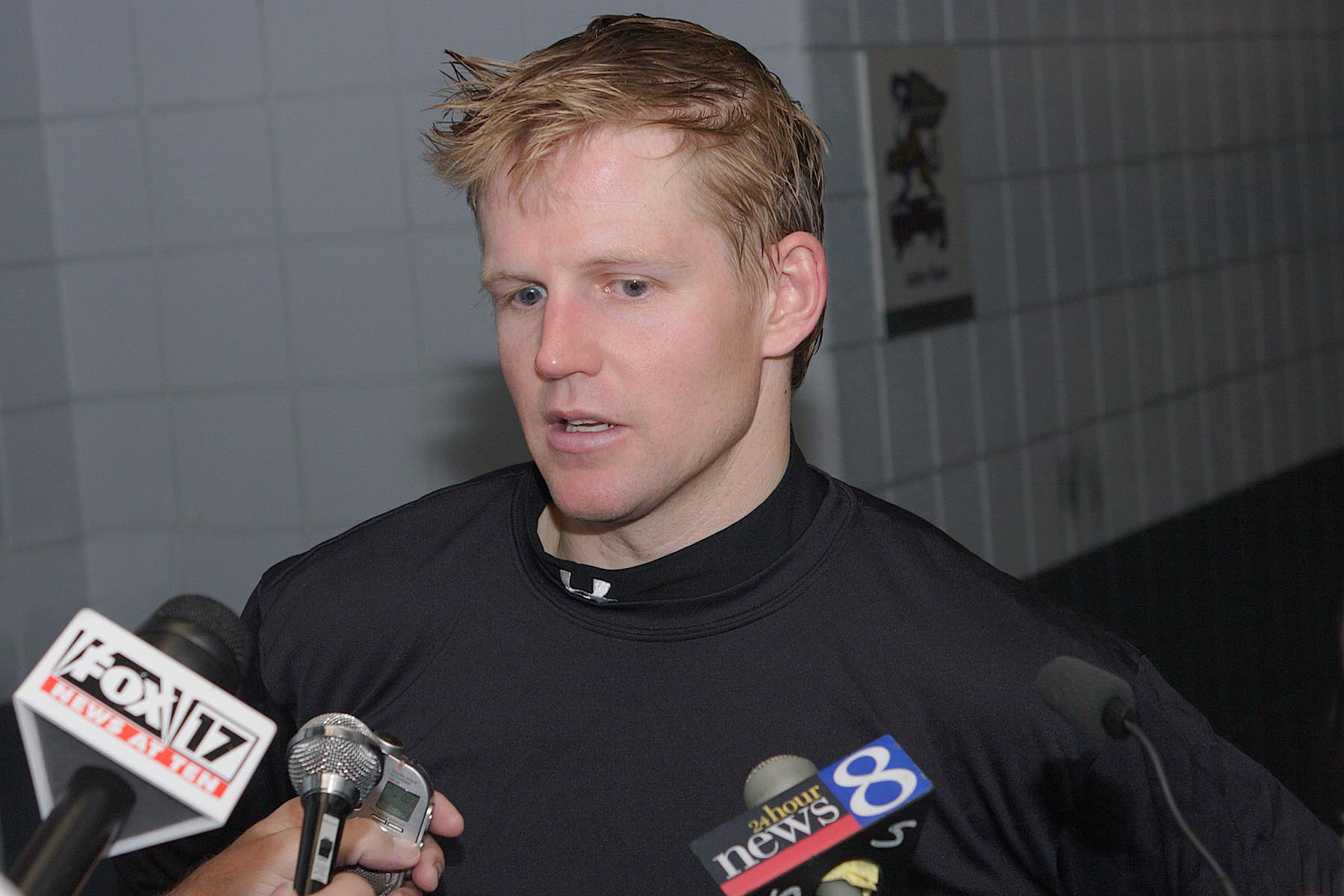
- Osgood in 2005
- Born: November 26, 1972 (age 53) Peace River, Alberta, Canada
- Height: 5 ft 10 in (178 cm)
- Weight: 178 lb (81 kg; 12 st 10 lb)
- Position: Goaltender
- Caught: Left
- Played for: Detroit Red Wings; New York Islanders; St. Louis Blues
- NHL draft: 54th overall, 1991; Detroit Red Wings
- Playing career: 1992–2011

Christopher John Osgood (born November 26, 1972) is a Canadian former professional ice hockey goaltender who is currently a Detroit Red Wings studio analyst and part-time color commentator for FanDuel Sports Network Detroit. He won three Stanley Cup championships in his career, all with the Red Wings, with his first as the backup goaltender in 1997, and his other two as the starting goaltender in 1998 and 2008. All together, he appeared in five Stanley Cup Finals during his career, again all with the Red Wings. Between the four Stanley Cups the Red Wings won between 1997 and 2008, Osgood only missed the 2002 Stanley Cup championship. He is currently ranked 13th in wins in NHL regular season history with 401.

Osgood spent the first part of his 17-year NHL career with the Red Wings, then the Islanders, and afterwards the St. Louis Blues before returning to Detroit in 2005 after the NHL lockout. Osgood was known in Detroit by his nicknames "Ozzy," chanted by the crowd after a big save, and "The Wizard of Oz."

He was the last NHL goalie to wear a traditional player's helmet/cage combo instead of the newer one piece goalie mask until Rick DiPietro briefly wore one of Osgood's in 2011, after he was injured in a fight with Brent Johnson. He is also one of only 18 goaltenders in NHL history to have scored a goal, and one of only 12 to have scored by shooting the puck directly into the opponent's net (not an "own goal"), on March 6, 1996 versus the Hartford Whalers.

== Playing career ==
Chris Osgood was drafted 54th overall by the Red Wings in the third round of the 1991 NHL entry draft and made his debut during the 1993–94 season.

=== Rookie year ===
Osgood became the fourth goaltender to man the crease for Detroit that season alongside Tim Cheveldae, Vincent Riendeau, and Peter Ing. Cheveldae, the team's primary starter, and a former All-Star, along with Dallas Drake, was traded to the Winnipeg Jets in exchange for veteran goaltender Bob Essensa and defenceman Sergei Bautin. Essensa did not have a strong showing in a 13-game stint at the end of the regular season, and Osgood was named the primary goaltender for the playoffs. The San Jose Sharks defeated the heavily favored Red Wings in seven games. The most memorable scene of the series occurred in the deciding game. With the game tied 2–2 late in the third period, Osgood went to clear a puck around the boards, but it landed on Sharks forward Jamie Baker's stick, who then scored the winning goal. Overtaken by remorse at his mistake, the young goaltender wept at his stall following the game.

Following the season, Detroit management felt the team needed a strong veteran goaltender with Stanley Cup playoff experience. In the summer of 1994, the Red Wings traded defenceman Steve Chiasson to the Calgary Flames for goaltender Mike Vernon, who had previously helped the Flames to the Stanley Cup title in 1989.

=== Initial Detroit success ===
While the 1994–95 season started late due to a lockout, Osgood served as a backup goaltender for Mike Vernon for the season. The Wings reached the 1995 Stanley Cup Final that season, where they were swept in four games by the underdog New Jersey Devils. Osgood received significantly more playing time for the 1995–96 season, and he led the NHL with a 2.17 GAA and 39 wins. He also finished third in shutouts (5) and was a Vezina Trophy runner-up to Jim Carey. He was the Red Wings starting goaltender for the 1996 Stanley Cup playoffs, losing in game six of the Western Conference Final to the Colorado Avalanche. Osgood and Vernon shared the William M. Jennings Trophy as the goaltenders, allowing the fewest goals in the league. For his efforts, Osgood was selected for the NHL All-Star Game and was also named for the post-season NHL All-Star second team.

That season, he scored against the Hartford Whalers, becoming the second goaltender in NHL history to score a goal after Ron Hextall. Former Islanders goaltender Billy Smith was also credited with a goal as the player last touching the puck, but only Osgood and Hextall directly shot the puck in.

The next season, Osgood and Vernon shared starting goaltender duties in the regular season. Still, when the playoffs began, Head Coach Scotty Bowman decided to go with Vernon as the starting goaltender for the playoffs, who lead the team all the way to the Cup Final against the Philadelphia Flyers and swept them, winning the Conn Smythe Trophy in the process. This was the franchise's first Stanley Cup in 42 years. In the end, Osgood had his name engraved on the Stanley Cup as the backup goaltender for the team.

After the 1997 Cup win, Vernon was traded to the San Jose Sharks, making Osgood Detroit's number-one goaltender. Again, the Red Wings advanced to the Stanley Cup Final and defeated the Washington Capitals in another four-game sweep to win back-to-back Stanley Cup championships, his second championship, and his first as the starting goaltender.

On April 1, 1998, he was in a goalie fight with Avalanche goalie Patrick Roy, who also fought with Vernon the previous year on March 26, 1997.

Osgood remained Detroit's primary goaltender until the summer of 2001, working alongside Ken Wregget and the young Manny Legacé.

=== Islanders years ===
In the summer of 2001, the Red Wings traded for Buffalo Sabres goaltender Dominik Hašek to upgrade their goaltending, after losing three years in a row to their arch rival Colorado in the second round twice, and afterwards losing to the Los Angeles Kings in the first round in 2001, with Hašek being a six-time Vezina Trophy winner with the Sabres. After numerous attempts to trade Osgood, the Red Wings left him unprotected in the waiver draft, and the Islanders were able to claim a Stanley Cup winning goaltender for nothing in return. Initially, Osgood wore the red pads he'd worn the previous year with the Red Wings before eventually changing his equipment to the blue of the Islanders.

Osgood split playing time with Garth Snow for the 2001–2002 season and helped the Islanders to a playoff berth, where they lost a seven-game series to the Toronto Maple Leafs. Osgood split time with both Snow and Rick DiPietro for the 2002–2003 season before being traded to the St. Louis Blues on March 11, 2003, along with a third-round pick in the 2003 NHL draft (which would be Konstantin Barulin) for Justin Papineau and a second-round pick in the 2003 draft (Jeremy Colliton).

=== Stint in St. Louis ===
For the remainder of the 2002–2003 season and the entire 2003–2004 season, Osgood remained the primary goaltender for the St. Louis Blues. Although Osgood posted winning records for both seasons, the Blues did not advance past the playoff quarterfinals, losing to the Vancouver Canucks and San Jose Sharks, respectively. St. Louis did not renew Osgood's contract before the expiration of the collective bargaining agreement, and he became a free agent.

=== Return to Detroit ===
On August 8, 2005, Detroit returned Osgood with a one-year, $800,000 contract. He was initially set to compete for the starting job with Manny Legace but suffered a groin tear and did not play when the season started. Osgood was assigned to play for the Grand Rapids Griffins of the American Hockey League (AHL) on a conditioning assignment. After posting a 2–1 record in three games, Osgood returned to Detroit to work in a goaltending tandem with Legace again.

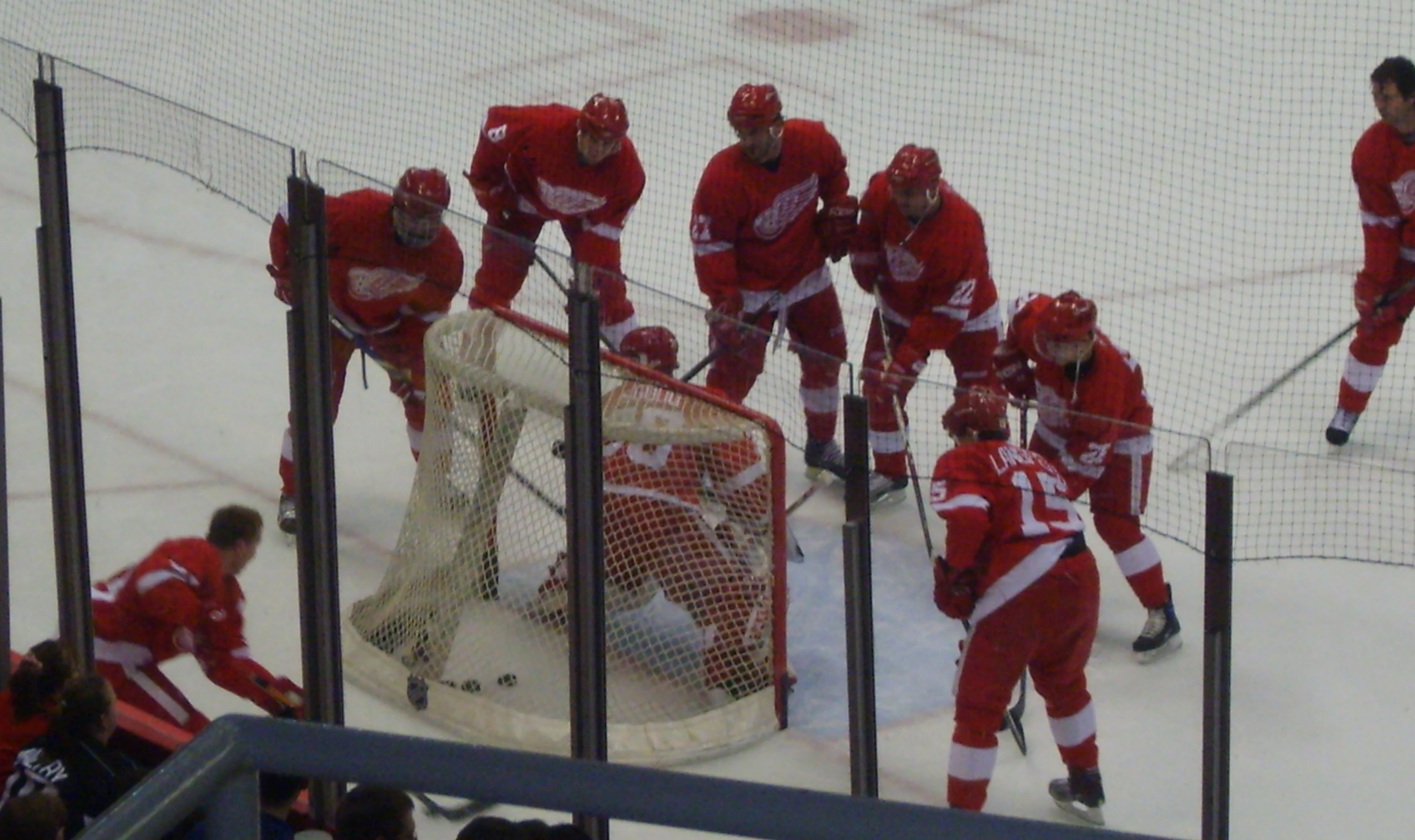
Osgood and the Red Wings perform a drill in practice before a game against the Los Angeles Kings on March 9, 2007.

Osgood also worked with rookie goaltenders Jimmy Howard and Joey MacDonald while Legacé recovered from knee injuries in late 2005. During the 2006 Stanley Cup playoffs, Osgood injured his groin preparing for game four of the first round against the Edmonton Oilers. Osgood missed the remainder of the series, and the Red Wings post-season was over after 6 games against the Oilers.

On July 1, 2006, Osgood re-signed to a two-year, $1.8 million contract with the Red Wings. He then shared goaltending duties with Hašek, who also returned for another stint with the Red Wings. Though Hašek was expected to get slightly more playing time than Osgood throughout the regular season, it was expected that the goaltending tandem would have shared most of the playing time, with MacDonald expected to be their backup. However, Osgood suffered a fractured hand in practice, placing him on the injured reserve while MacDonald stepped up as the number 2 goaltender in Osgood's leave.

Osgood returned to playing by the end of December. Due to Osgood's injuries and the aging Hašek's ability to remain healthy throughout the season, Osgood ended up assuming the backup role for Hašek instead of sharing playing time.

The 2007–08 season served as a return to form for Osgood. Osgood and Hašek remained Detroit's goaltending tandem for the 2007–08 season. While Osgood was still expected to be the backup goaltender for the team, Hašek struggled at the beginning of the season and subsequently became injured. Osgood assumed the starting role while Hašek was injured and put up superior numbers. As of April 30, 2008, Osgood ranked 1st in the NHL in GAA with 2.09 during the regular season, 16th in Save Percentage with 0.914, and had an impressive 27–9–4 record. That performance earned him a 3 year/$4.5M contract extension with the Red Wings and an appearance at the 2008 NHL All-Star Game. With Hašek healthy and getting back into his stride, Detroit chose to alternate goaltenders instead of designating either goaltender as the backup.

=== 2008 Stanley Cup playoffs ===
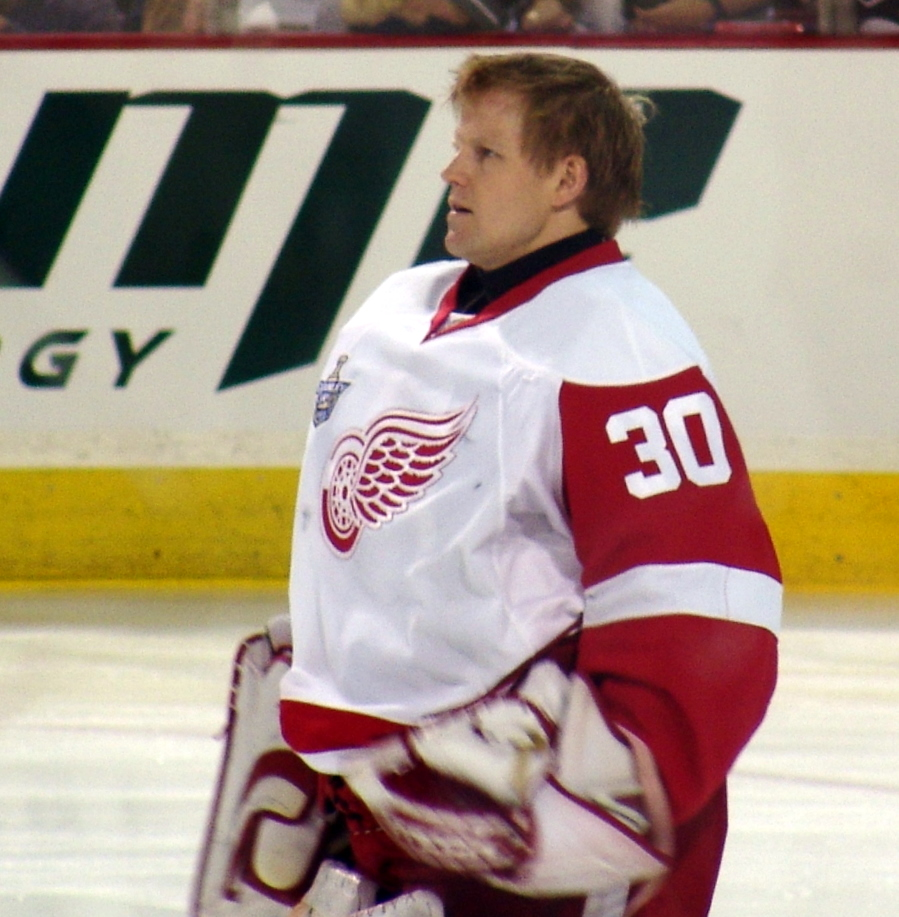
Osgood before game four of the 2008 Stanley Cup Final

Hašek was selected to be the starting goaltender for team in the 2008 Stanley Cup playoffs, and the Red Wings met the Nashville Predators in the opening round. Hasek won Games 1 and 2 in Detroit before performing poorly in Nashville in Games 3 and 4. Head Coach Mike Babcock decided to pull him in favor of Osgood midway through game four, and he never left the net after that. He started game five, which was a Red Wings overtime win, and won game six in Nashville to eliminate the Predators, moving on to the second round against the Avalanche. The team swept the Avalanche in four straight games to move onto the Western Conference Final, with their opponent in the series being the Dallas Stars. The Red Wings won Games 1, 2, and 3 to hand them a three-game deficit. With a trip possible to the Cup Final with a game four win, they lost, which was Osgood's first loss in the playoffs after 9 straight playoff wins since he replaced Hašek in game four of the first round against the Predators. Losing game five in Detroit as well, Osgood shone in game six, stopping all but one shot in a game riddled with Red Wings penalties and sealing the win, sending them to the Stanley Cup Finals, his first Finals appearance in ten seasons, to meet the young Pittsburgh Penguins. In Games One and Two of the Stanley Cup Final in Detroit, Osgood posted back-to-back shutouts against the offensively powerful Pens, making him the fourth goalie in NHL history to start the Finals with back-to-back shutouts. Between the two games, he made a total of 41 saves. The Red Wings were up 3-1 after winning game four in Pittsburgh in the series, with a chance to win the Cup on home ice in game five, and were leading 3-2 in the game after letting in two quick goals in the beginning of the game before tying it and taking the lead with less than 40 seconds to go, before Penguins forward Max Talbot managed to bang in the puck and tie it, which went all the way to triple overtime before Penguins forward Petr Sykora scored after saying he would to send the series back to Pittsburgh for a sixth game. His save as time expired in game six against Penguin Marian Hossa, after leading 3-1 in the game with less than 2 minutes to go in regulation before letting in another late goal to make it 3-2, prevented the Pens from tying the game up again late like they did in the previous game five and sealed the game six win and hence the Stanley Cup win for the Red Wings and for Osgood, who won his second championship as a starting goaltender. His final 2008 playoff record was 14–4 with a 1.55 GAA; he was considered a contender for the Conn Smythe Trophy which eventually went to teammate Henrik Zetterberg.

=== Aftermath of the Stanley Cup ===
The following 2008–09 season was a sharp contrast to the 2008 playoffs for Osgood, who struggled heavily for virtually the entire season, and ended it with the worst statistical numbers of his entire career. "It was the worst I've played in that long of a stretch in my career," he said. "Let's be honest.". A combination of injuries and self-inflicted mental pressure adversely affected his game, to the point where late in the season he was essentially "sent home" for ten days by the Red Wings, in order for him to work with goaltending coach Jim Bedard and re-focus. Although his 26 wins put him 10th all-time in the NHL by season's end, he finished with a GAA a full goal above what he had posted in 2007–08, and a save percentage in the bottom ten percent of all 45 goalies who played enough to qualify.

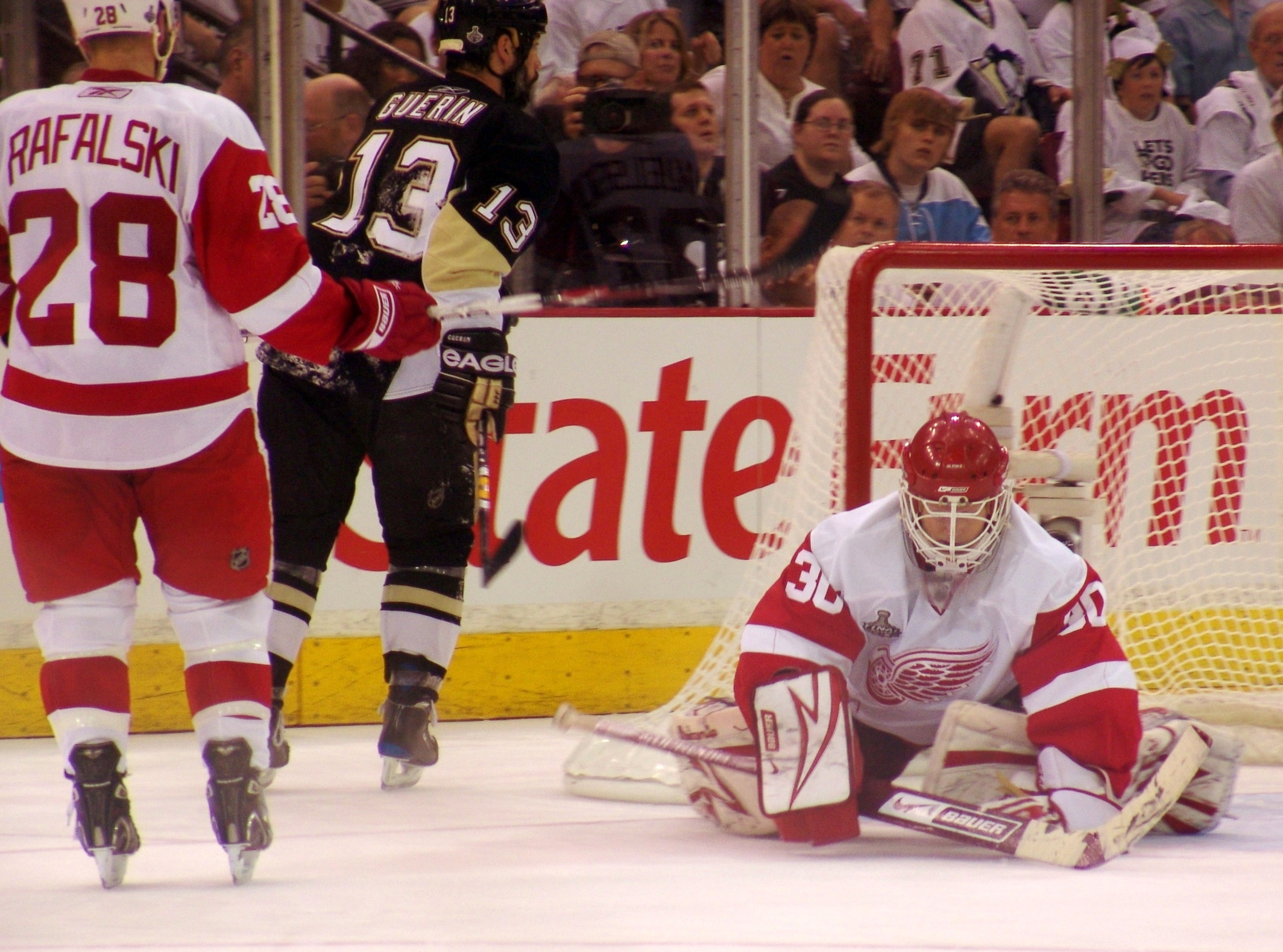
Osgood during game six of the 2009 Stanley Cup Final

Despite being visibly outplayed statistically in nearly every aspect by newly signed Ty Conklin during the regular season, whom he credited for managing to stabilize the net for the team and for not allowing the goaltending situation to become much worse than it was, Osgood's immense playoff experience was referred to throughout the season, and he was the starting goaltender for the team in the 2009 playoffs. The team managed to sweep the Columbus Blue Jackets in the first round, moving on to meet the Anaheim Ducks in the second round, which was a hard thought and very physical seven game series which the Red Wings won in game seven in Detroit. Moving onto the Western Conference Final against the young Chicago Blackhawks, the Red Wings managed to beat them in five games, and was benched and replaced by Conklin for the first time in the playoffs in the third period of game four, due to dehydration. The game five overtime win advanced the Red Wings to the Stanley Cup Final for the second straight year, which was also a rematch from the previous year as they met the Pittsburgh Penguins again. His drastically improved performance led to speculation that he was Detroit's leading candidate for the Conn Smythe Trophy. However, this time, Detroit was defeated in seven games, after leading 3-2 in the series again like in the previous year with two chances to win it after Osgood posted a 5-0 shutout in game five, losing game six in Pittsburgh 2-1, and game seven at home in Detroit, again 2-1, with the Pens Max Talbot scoring both Penguins goals.

The following season, Osgood continued to struggle in regular season play, and eventually lost his position as Detroit's starting goaltender to his newly promoted backup for the season from Grand Rapids and rookie goaltender Jimmy Howard. However, the Red Wings in general under performed, mainly at the beginning of the season due to injuries to key players. Osgood finished the 2009–10 season having played only 23 games, with most of these at the beginning of the season when he was still the starter before being replaced by Howard, and posting a 3.02 GAA and .888 save percentage.

Osgood, and the team in general, had better statistics during the next season, which would be his last. Continuing to be the backup and a mentor for Howard, on December 27, 2010, in a game against the Avalanche at Pepsi Center, Osgood earned his 400th career victory. He became just the 10th goaltender in NHL history to reach this milestone. The Red Wings won the game 4–3 in overtime on a goal by teammate Niklas Kronwall. He played the last NHL game of his career on January 4, 2011 in Edmonton against the Edmonton Oilers, which also would be the last win of his career, before being injured and MacDonald replacing him as the backup to Howard while he was on IR for the remainder of the season and playoffs. On July 19, 2011, Osgood announced his retirement from ice hockey, but remained with the Wings organization in a role developing young goaltenders with the assistance of his former goaltending coach Tom Danko.

=== Post-playing career ===
On September 9, 2013, it was announced that Chris Osgood was hired as a Red Wings game and studio analyst for Fox Sports Detroit, replacing fired-former teammate Larry Murphy. In this role, he primarily provides analysis in the studio, but he also replaced Mickey Redmond on select road games throughout the season. On February 14, 2019, the network announced that he and Murphy will rotate in the same capacity for the rest of the 2018–19 season and beyond.

On August 30, 2016, Osgood, joined Red Wings' vice president Jim Devellano as part-owner of the Ontario Hockey League's Saginaw Spirit. Osgood serves as a goaltending and general consultant to the team.

== Career statistics ==
=== Regular season and playoffs ===
			Regular season										Playoffs
Season	Team	League	GP	W	L	T	OTL	MIN	GA	SO	GAA	SV%	GP	W	L	MIN	GA	SO	GAA	SV%
1989–90	Medicine Hat Tigers	WHL	57	24	28	2	—	3,094	228	0	4.42	.883	3	0	3	173	17	0	5.89	—
1990–91	Medicine Hat Tigers	WHL	46	23	18	3	—	2,630	173	2	3.95	.901	12	7	5	712	42	0	3.53	—
1991–92	Medicine Hat Tigers	WHL	15	10	3	0	—	819	44	0	3.22	.909	—	—	—	—	—	—	—	—
1991–92	Brandon Wheat Kings	WHL	16	3	10	1	—	890	60	1	4.04	.899	—	—	—	—	—	—	—	—
1991–92	Seattle Thunderbirds	WHL	21	12	7	1	—	1,217	65	1	3.20	.901	15	9	6	904	51	0	3.38	.896
1992–93	Adirondack Red Wings	AHL	45	19	19	4	—	2,438	159	0	3.91	.880	1	0	1	59	2	0	2.03	—
1993–94	Adirondack Red Wings	AHL	4	3	1	0	—	239	13	0	3.26	.893	—	—	—	—	—	—	—	—
1993–94	Detroit Red Wings	NHL	41	23	8	5	—	2,206	105	2	2.86	.895	6	3	2	307	12	1	2.35	.891
1994–95	Adirondack Red Wings	AHL	2	1	1	0	—	120	6	0	3.00	.908	—	—	—	—	—	—	—	—
1994–95	Detroit Red Wings	NHL	19	14	5	0	—	1,087	41	1	2.26	.917	2	0	0	68	2	0	1.76	.920
1995–96	Detroit Red Wings	NHL	50	39	6	5	—	2,933	106	5	2.17	.911	15	8	7	936	33	2	2.12	.898
1996–97	Detroit Red Wings	NHL	47	23	13	9	—	2,769	106	6	2.30	.910	2	0	0	47	2	0	2.55	.905
1997–98	Detroit Red Wings	NHL	64	33	20	11	—	3,807	140	6	2.21	.913	22	16	6	1,381	48	2	2.12	.918
1998–99	Detroit Red Wings	NHL	63	34	25	4	—	3,691	149	3	2.42	.910	6	4	2	358	14	1	2.35	.919
1999–00	Detroit Red Wings	NHL	53	30	14	8	—	3,148	126	6	2.40	.907	9	5	4	547	18	2	1.97	.924
2000–01	Detroit Red Wings	NHL	52	25	19	4	—	2,834	127	1	2.69	.903	6	2	4	365	15	1	2.47	.905
2001–02	New York Islanders	NHL	66	32	25	6	—	3,743	156	4	2.50	.910	7	3	4	392	17	0	2.60	.912
2002–03	New York Islanders	NHL	37	17	14	4	—	1,993	97	2	2.92	.894	—	—	—	—	—	—	—	—
2002–03	St. Louis Blues	NHL	9	4	3	2	—	532	27	2	3.05	.888	7	3	4	417	17	1	2.45	.907
2003–04	St. Louis Blues	NHL	67	31	25	8	—	3,861	144	3	2.24	.910	5	1	4	287	12	0	2.51	.890
2005–06	Grand Rapids Griffins	AHL	3	2	1	—	0	180	10	0	3.33	.882	—	—	—	—	—	—	—	—
2005–06	Detroit Red Wings	NHL	32	20	6	—	5	1,846	85	2	2.76	.897	—	—	—	—	—	—	—	—
2006–07	Detroit Red Wings	NHL	21	11	3	—	6	1,161	46	0	2.38	.907	—	—	—	—	—	—	—	—
2007–08	Detroit Red Wings	NHL	43	27	9	—	4	2,409	84	4	2.09	.914	19	14	4	1,159	30	3	1.55	.930
2008–09	Detroit Red Wings	NHL	46	26	9	—	8	2,663	137	2	3.09	.887	23	15	8	1,406	47	2	2.01	.926
2009–10	Detroit Red Wings	NHL	23	7	9	—	4	1,252	63	1	3.02	.888	—	—	—	—	—	—	—	—
2010–11	Detroit Red Wings	NHL	11	5	3	—	2	629	29	0	2.77	.903	—	—	—	—	—	—	—	—
NHL totals			744	401	216	66	29	42,564	1,768	50	2.49	.905	129	74	49	7,651	267	15	2.09	.916

== Awards and achievements ==
- WHL East second All-Star team – 1991
- Member of the Stanley Cup Champion Detroit Red Wings – 1997, 1998, 2008 (starting goaltender in 1998 and 2008)
- 2-time winner of the William M. Jennings Trophy (shared with Mike Vernon – 1996), (shared with Dominik Hašek – 2008)
- Is currently 13th all-time in wins by an NHL goaltender
- Is currently 9th in all-time playoff wins
- Is currently tied with Clint Benedict for 5th in all-time playoff shut-outs
- Played in
  - 1996 NHL All-Star Game
  - 2008 NHL All-Star Game (named starter by Red Wings and Western Conference head coach Mike Babcock)
- Named to the 1997 NHL All-Star Game, but was unable to attend because of an injury.
- Named to NHL second All-Star team after 1995–96 season
- Named to WHL East second All-Star team after 1990–91 season
- Led NHL in GAA in 2008 (regular season 2.09 & playoffs 1.55)
- Led NHL in wins in 1996
- Scored a goal versus Hartford Whalers on March 6, 1996.
- First goaltender since Terry Sawchuk to win Stanley Cups ten years or more apart as a starter (Sawchuk in 1955 and 1967)
- Became only the 10th goaltender in NHL history to achieve 400 wins on Dec 27th 2010 in a 4–3 overtime win against the Colorado Avalanche
- 4th all-time NHL leader in win percentage (60%)

== See also ==
- List of goaltenders who have scored a goal in an NHL game
- List of NHL goaltenders with 300 wins
- List of Detroit Red Wings draft picks
- List of Detroit Red Wings records

Awards and achievements
Preceded by Ed Belfour; Niklas Bäckström, Manny Fernandez	Winner of the William M. Jennings Trophy; 1996 (with Mike Vernon); 2008 (with Dominik Hašek)	Succeeded by Martin Brodeur, Mike Dunham; Tim Thomas, Manny Fernandez
