= List of goalscoring NHL goaltenders =

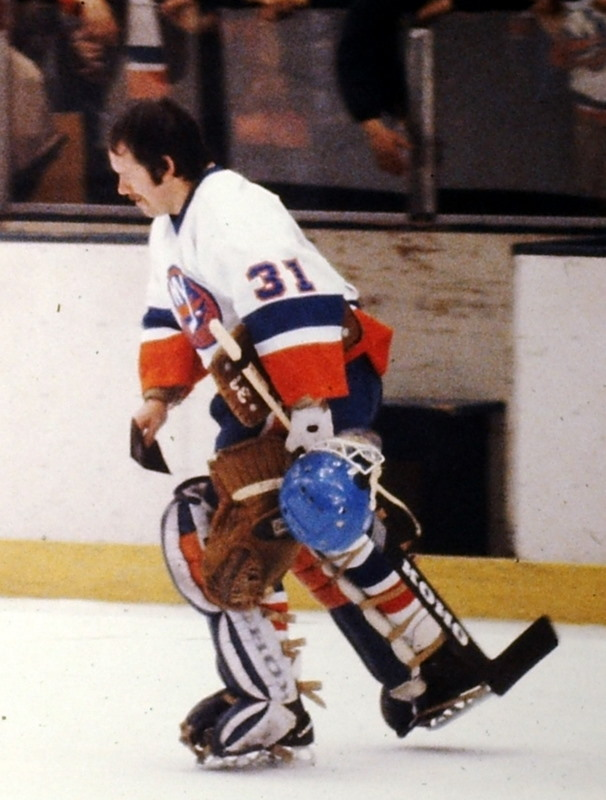
In 1979, Billy Smith became the first NHL goaltender in history to be credited with a goal.

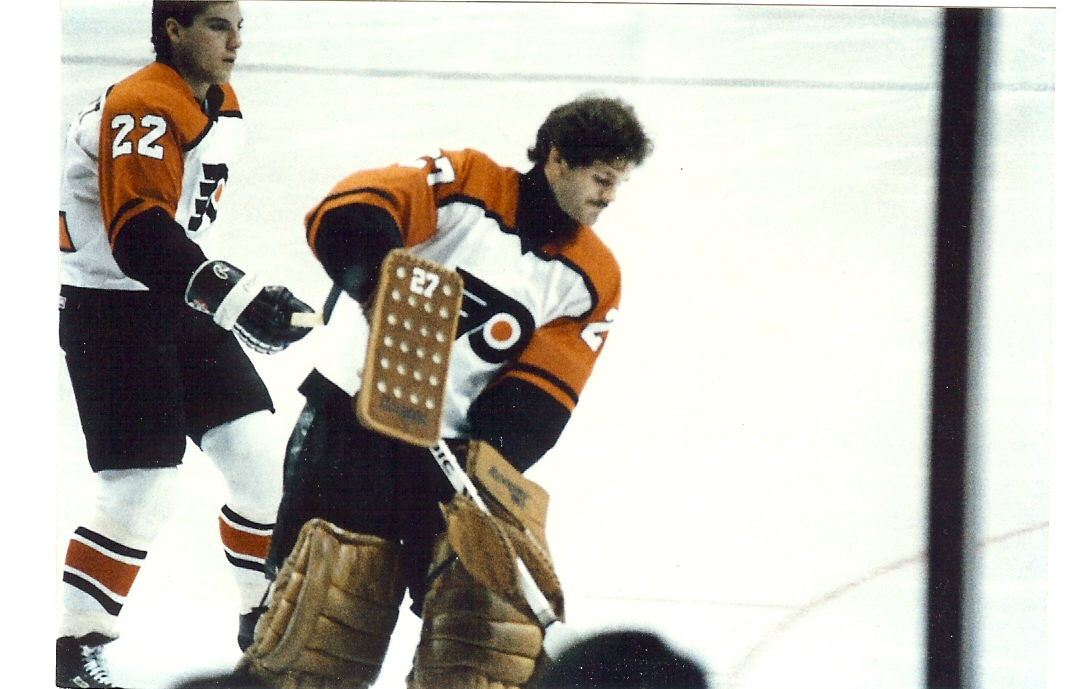
In 1987, Ron Hextall became the first goaltender to score via a direct shot on goal, and later became the first with a short-handed goal. Hextall is the only goaltender to have scored more than once with a direct shot on goal.

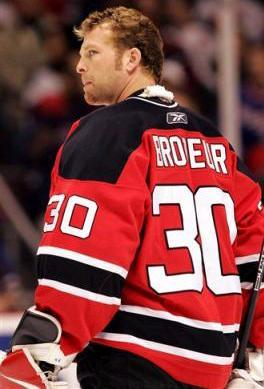
Martin Brodeur is the only goaltender to be credited with three goals, two in the regular season and one in the playoffs. He is also the only goaltender credited with a game-winning goal.

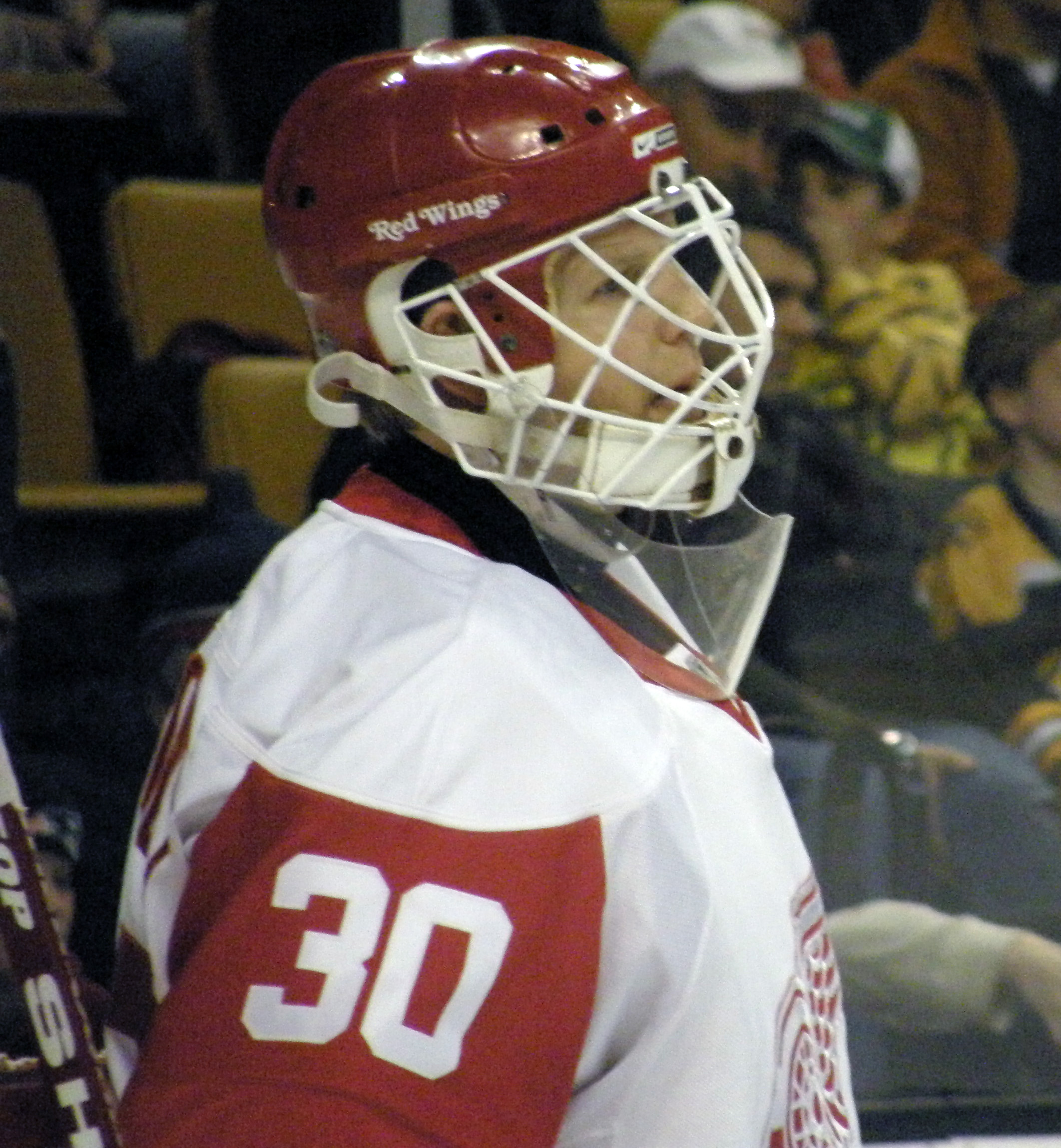
After a seven-year lull, Chris Osgood was the first goaltender to directly shoot a goal since Ron Hextall did so in the 1989 playoffs.

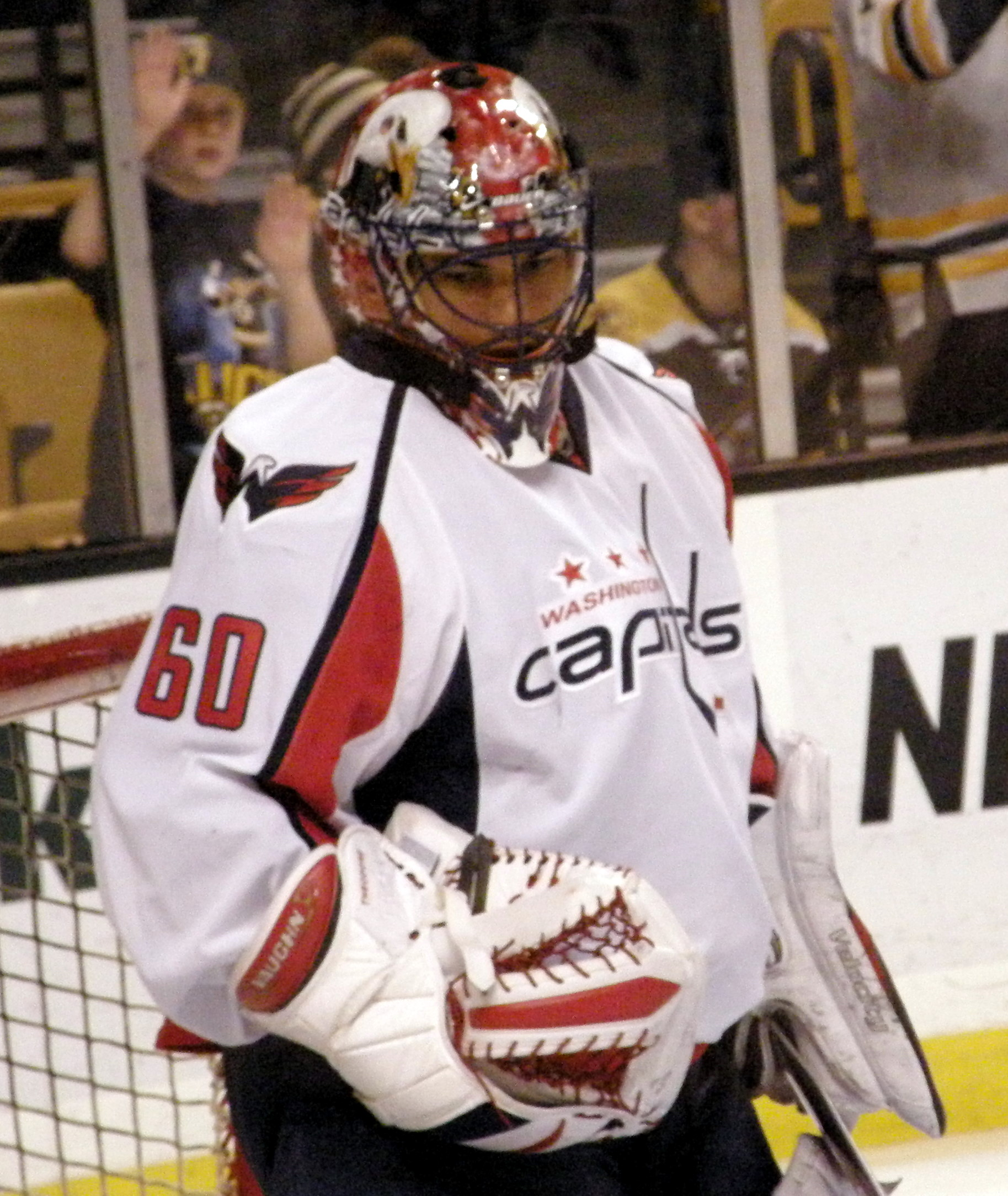
Jose Theodore, then playing for the Montreal Canadiens, scored a goal and shutout in a 3–0 game against the New York Islanders.

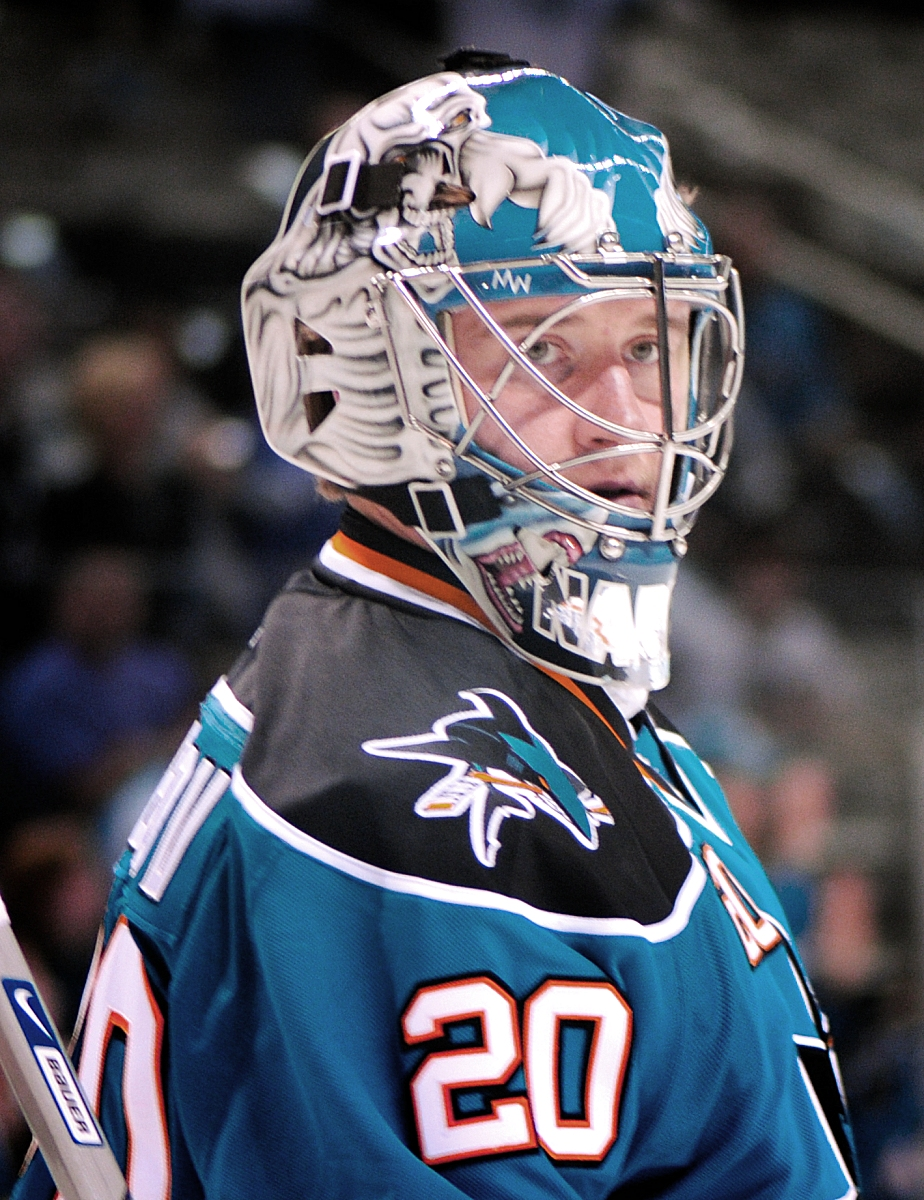
Evgeni Nabokov was the first non-North American goaltender to directly shoot a goal.

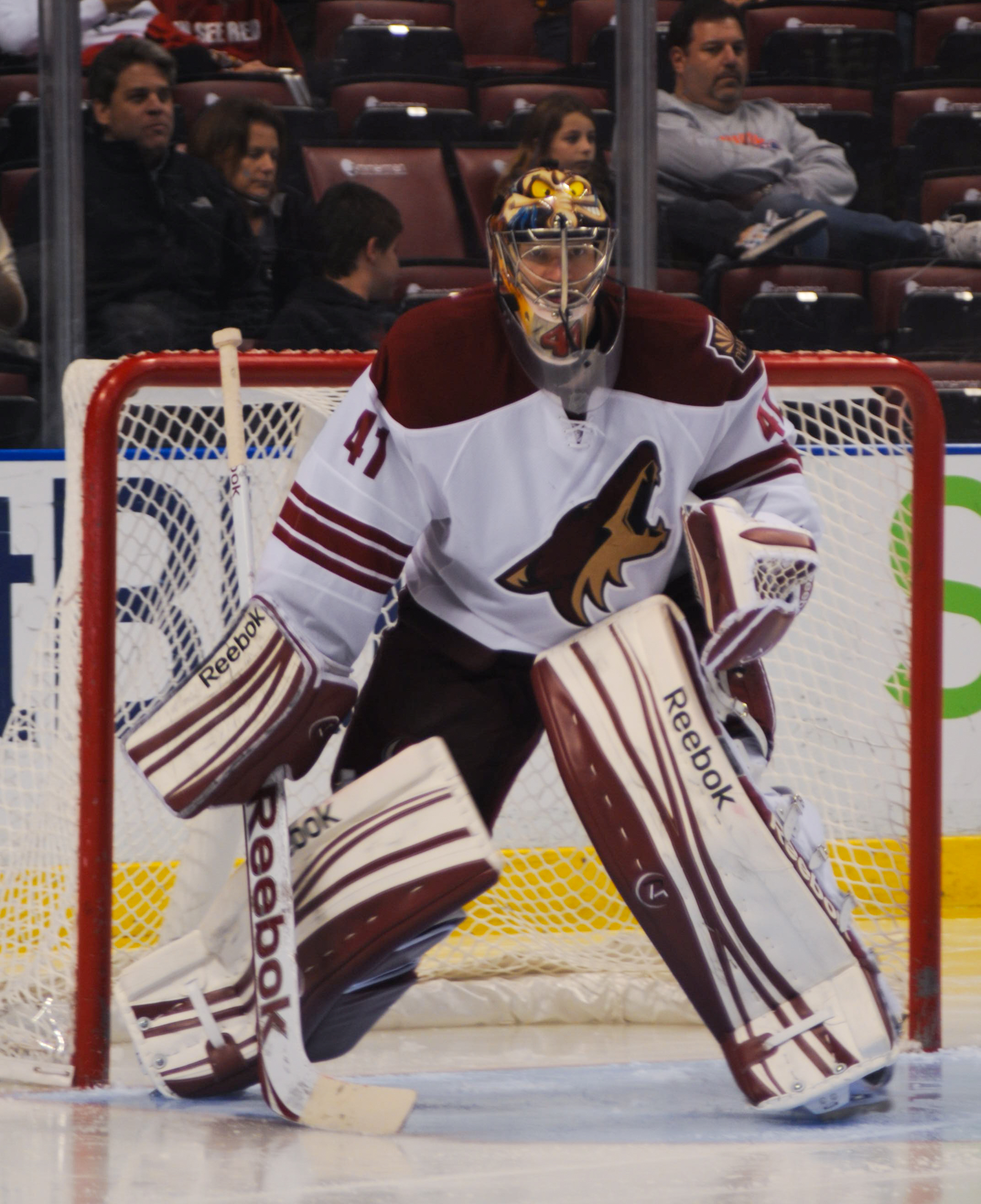
Mike Smith was the first goaltender in over 11 years, since Nabokov, to directly shoot a goal.

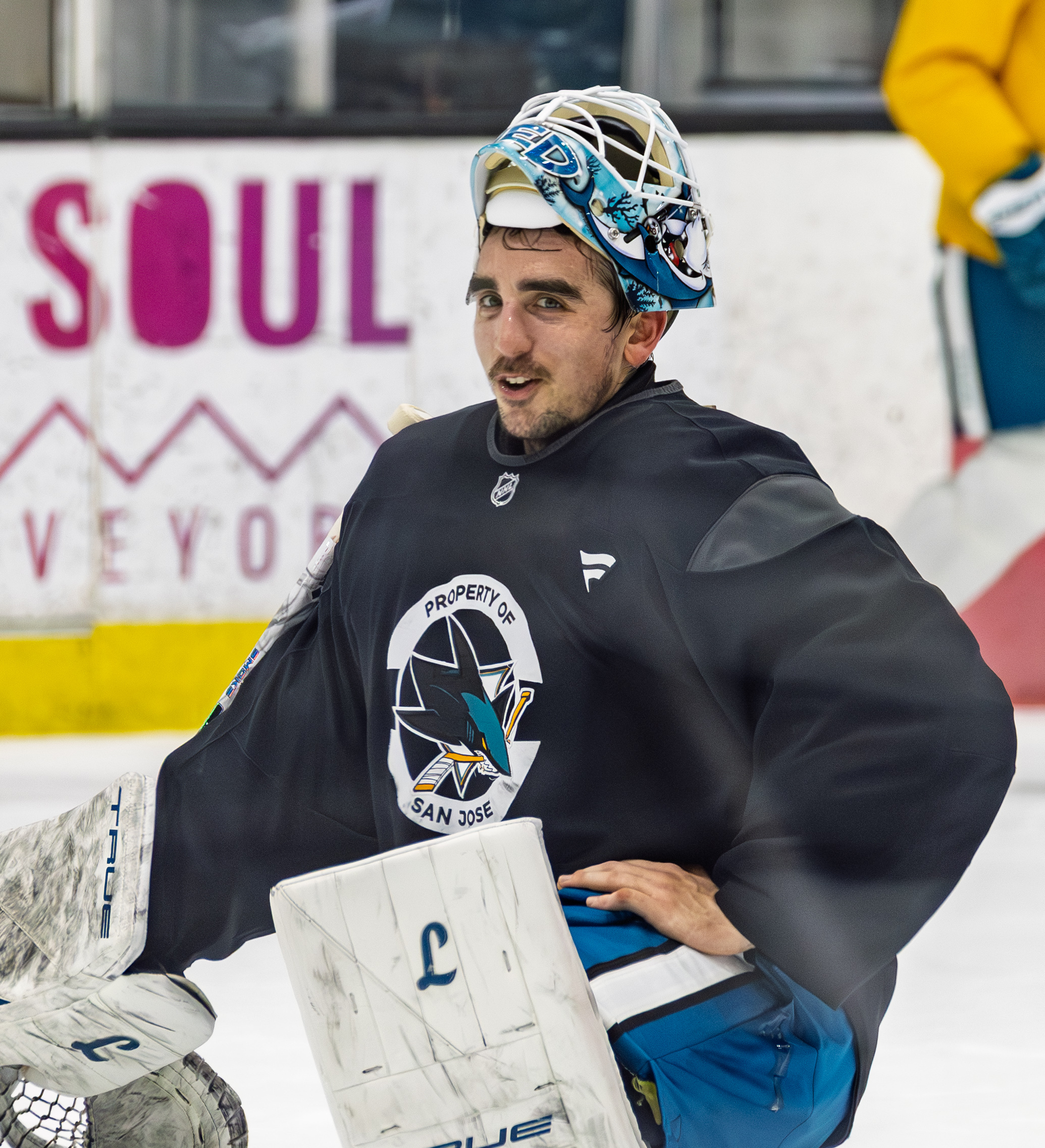
Alex Nedeljkovic was the first goaltender to record a goal and assist in the same game, as well as score goals in the NHL, American Hockey League, and ECHL.

Eighteen goaltenders have scored a total of twenty-one goals in National Hockey League (NHL) games. Such goals are often called a "goalie goal." A goalkeeper can score by either shooting the puck into the net or being awarded the goal as the last player on his team to touch the puck when an opponent scored an own goal. A goal scored by shooting the puck is particularly challenging as the goaltender has to aim for a 6-foot-wide (1.8-metre) net that is close to 180 feet (55 metres) away while avoiding opposing defensemen; in the case of own goals, the combined circumstance of the own goal itself in addition to the goaltender being the last player to touch the puck makes it an infrequent occurrence. Of the twenty-one goals, thirteen were scored by shooting the puck and eight were the result of own goals.

Goaltenders have participated in the offense, albeit in a limited way, since the sport's earliest days. Before the creation of the NHL in 1917, there were some instances recorded of goaltenders rushing down the ice to participate in the play, occasionally scoring a goal. This practice fell out of favour with goaltenders and coaches as goaltending training and equipment became more specialized, greatly reducing the goaltender's ability to participate in offensive play effectively, and was eventually outlawed (goaltenders are not allowed to cross the centre red line to play the puck) after the Toronto Maple Leafs' Gary Smith was injured on such a rush in the 1966–67 NHL season. During the history of the league, there had been some near-misses by goaltenders, including attempts by Chuck Rayner by aiming at the empty net, or joining the attack. In 1977, Rogatien Vachon briefly became the first goaltender to score a goal after being credited following an own goal by the opponent, before it was given instead to a teammate by later video review.

Billy Smith of the New York Islanders became the first goaltender to score an NHL goal on November 28, 1979, when he was given credit following an own goal by the Colorado Rockies. Ron Hextall of the Philadelphia Flyers became the second goalkeeper to score, and the first to score by taking a shot. Martin Brodeur has scored the most NHL goals by a goaltender, with two in the regular season and one in the playoffs.

The most recent goal was scored by Igor Shesterkin of the New York Rangers on October 1, 2026, against the Tampa Bay Lightning.

== Technique ==
Under modern rules, the only realistic chance for the goaltender to score exists when the opposing goaltender is pulled for an extra attacker, leaving the 6-foot-wide (1.8-metre) net at the other end of the rink empty. It is presumed that the opposing goaltender, if in the net, would not commit a blunder and allow such a long shot to be successful. Furthermore, a goaltender is not allowed to cross the centre red line to participate in a play, where the position of the puck is prescribed as the "determining factor" by Rule 27 of the Official NHL Rule Book.

The result of the above is that a goaltender cannot participate in play in the opponent's zone, and must take a shot from his side of the rink. Coaches generally discourage any player from shooting at an empty net from their side of the red line because if the shot goes wide, it results in an icing infraction (unless the team is short-handed). An icing infraction brings the face-off back to the defensive zone and prohibits the offending team from making any substitutions. In practice, a shot attempted by a goaltender is taken from the side of his own net, because further travel (towards the opponent's net) would come with a risk of losing control of the puck. Due to the distance between the two nets, the puck has to be shot with a trajectory and speed that prevents the opposing team from stopping it while it travels. All NHL goaltenders who have scored a goal by shooting the puck have done so into an empty net, while the goals credited to goaltenders who did not shoot the puck were all the result of own goals by the opposing team who had their crease vacated.

A goaltender attempting to score on an empty net is not without risk, as doing so will often put the goaltender out of position and make it easier for the opposition to score should the goaltender's shot be intercepted. As such, goalies typically will only attempt to score if their team is leading by two or more goals. Of the eleven NHL goals scored by goaltenders directly, only three were scored by goaltenders with only a one-goal lead: Chris Osgood, Linus Ullmark and Tristan Jarry. Both Osgood's 1995–96 Detroit Red Wings and Ullmark's 2022–23 Boston Bruins were in the latter stages of dominant Presidents' Trophy-winning seasons when their goals were scored.

Rule 27.7, which prohibits goaltenders from advancing past the centre red line, was instituted in the 1966–67 NHL season. This was done after goaltender Gary Smith of the Toronto Maple Leafs was hit hard by Montreal Canadiens defenceman J. C. Tremblay's bodycheck as Smith was entering Montreal's zone carrying the puck. Before the institution of the rule, the only recorded instances of goaltenders scoring goals involved them rushing to their opponent's end of the rink, which generally occurred in the early days of ice hockey, around 1900. Furthermore, before 1931, empty-net situations did not arise as it was not yet customary to pull the goaltender late in the game for an extra attacker in an attempt to tie the score. This technique is credited to Art Ross, coach of the Boston Bruins, who pulled goaltender Tiny Thompson in game two of the semifinal playoff series against the Montreal Canadiens. An instance of an attempted empty-net shot by a goaltender was reported in January 1947, when New York Rangers goaltender Chuck Rayner "flashed 30 feet (9.1 m) from his goal and grabbed an untended puck" then missed the net "by a whisper"—the opposing goal had been vacated by the Toronto Maple Leafs pulling goaltender Turk Broda.

== History ==
Billy Smith of the New York Islanders, in the 1979–80 season, was the first goaltender to be credited with a goal in the NHL when Rob Ramage of the Colorado Rockies put the puck into his empty net. Smith was the last Islander to have touched the puck, and by NHL rule 78.4, an unassisted goal is awarded to the last player on the scoring team who had contacted the puck, in the event of an own goal. In addition to being the first goaltender to be credited with a goal, Billy Smith is the only goaltender to have scored in a game that he lost.

However, goaltenders' participation in offence began long before Billy Smith's goal. The first recorded goal scored by a goaltender in competitive play was in 1905. According to a Montreal Star report, poor officiating resulted in only the goaltenders left on the ice in a February 18 game between Montreal Westmount and the Quebec Bulldogs of Canadian Amateur Hockey League (CAHL). Fred Brophy (Montreal) and Hall of Famer Paddy Moran (Quebec) exchanged scoring attempts, before Brophy beat Moran, while the latter and most of the spectators "convulsed in laughter". Brophy repeated the feat a year later on March 7, 1906, by skating the length of the ice to score on goaltender Nathan Frye of the Montreal Victorias of the Eastern Canada Amateur Hockey Association (ECAHA).

The first goaltender credited with an assist in the NHL was Georges Vezina in the 1917–18 season after a puck rebounded off his leg pad to a teammate who skated the length of the ice to score. In the 1935–36 season, Tiny Thompson became the first goaltender to gain an assist after making an intentional pass. During the Second World War, while playing for the All-Star Canadian Army team, goaltender Chuck Rayner carried the puck down the ice and beat the opposing goaltender, Art Jones. In the NHL, he made numerous unsuccessful attempts to duplicate this feat; As a member of the New York Rangers, Rayner attempted to score both by aiming at an empty net and by rushing down the rink. There are at least two recorded instances of him skating to the other side of the ice after making a save, and he was experimentally used on the point during power-plays in the late 1940s.

In the 1976–77 season, Los Angeles Kings goaltender Rogie Vachon briefly became the first goaltender to be credited with a goal when the opposing New York Islanders scored on themselves during a delayed penalty; however, after video review, the goal was given to Vic Venasky as it was determined that he was the last Kings player to touch the puck before it went in the net. A similar case occurred in 1987 when the Islanders' Brent Sutter scored on his own net during a delayed penalty; the cross-town rival Rangers' Bob Froese was credited with the goal, briefly becoming the second goaltender to have been credited with an NHL goal. Later video review concluded that Froese had not touched the puck at all, and the goal was awarded to David Shaw.

The first goaltender to score a goal by intentionally shooting the puck into the opponent's net was the Philadelphia Flyers' Ron Hextall, who on December 8, 1987, scored on an empty net after Boston pulled their goaltender, Rejean Lemelin, for a sixth attacker late in the third period. The most recent goaltender to have scored a goal by deliberately shooting the puck into his opponents' net was Igor Shesterkin on October 1, 2026.

Of the twenty-one goals scored by NHL goaltenders, twelve were shot into the opposing team's net by the goaltender. Two goaltenders have scored a goal and earned a shutout in the same game. Damian Rhodes, playing for the Ottawa Senators, was credited with a goal in a 6–0 win over the New Jersey Devils on January 2, 1999, and Jose Theodore, playing for the Montreal Canadiens, shot the puck into the New York Islanders' empty net in a 3–0 victory on January 2, 2001, exactly two years later. Theodore's shot was the only backhand of the twelve. He is also the most recent goaltender to have scored a goal by deliberately shooting the puck without kneeling on the ice.

Chris Mason, Damian Rhodes, Tristan Jarry, and Alex Nedeljkovic are the only goaltenders to be credited with a goal in both the AHL and the NHL. Nedeljkovic is the only goaltender to score a goal in the NHL, AHL, and ECHL, and has the most professional goals for a goaltender, having scored two in the AHL. Mike Smith was also credited with a goal in both the NHL and the ECHL, having scored a goal as a member of the Lexington Men O' War on October 26, 2002, against the Dayton Bombers.

While both Ron Hextall and Martin Brodeur have scored more than one goal, Hextall is the only goaltender to score twice by directly shooting the puck into the opponent's net. Brodeur's second and third goals were own goals by the other team, where Brodeur received credit for touching the puck last. Brodeur's second goal is the only game-winning goal scored by a goaltender. Hextall and Brodeur both scored in a playoff game as well as a regular season game. Hextall's second goal is the only goal scored by a goaltender while his team was short handed, while Evgeni Nabokov, Martin Brodeur and Filip Gustavsson are the only goaltenders who scored on a power play. Martin Brodeur is the only goaltender to score against another goaltender, when he scored against Dan Ellis on his third career goal, although Ellis was on his way to the bench for an extra attacker on a delayed penalty call and failed to make it back to the net in time to prevent the puck from entering the goal. Brodeur is also the only goaltender who has scored an empty net goal while the opposing goaltender was on the bench and being the goaltender on the bench when another goaltender was credited with a goal. Of the goals scored by NHL goaltenders, the New Jersey Devils franchise has been involved in six of them, three goals for (highest total) and three goals against (highest total), including the first-ever goaltender goal when scored on in their previous incarnation as the Colorado Rockies.

Mike Smith was the first goaltender to score a goal in the NHL with the Turco grip, placing the catching glove overhand on the shaft of the stick.

Filip Gustavsson, Alex Nedeljkovic, and Ilya Sorokin's goals in the 2024–25 season were the first time in NHL history that more than one goaltender scored a goal in a single season. Nedeljkovic is also the only goaltender to score a goal and get an assist in the same game.

Igor Shesterkin's goal in the 2026–27 season was the earliest goal that was scored by a goaltender during a team's regular season; the goal came in the second game of the season, and home opener, for the New York Rangers, marking the first occurrence during the season's opening week.

== Scorers ==
Key
Symbol	Meaning
	Goaltender scored the goal directly with an intentional shot on goal (SOG)
SOG	Shot on goal: The puck was shot by the goaltender into the opponent's net
PPG	Power-play goal
SHG	Short-handed goal
GWG	Game-winning goal
DP	Goal scored on a delayed penalty
Bold name	Goaltender currently (2026–27) active in the NHL
Bold score	The goal was scored at home
(#)	Number of goals scored in a career, when more than one

List
Name	Team	Season	Date	Opposing team	Pulled goaltender	Method of scoring goal	Final score	Notes
Billy Smith	New York Islanders	1979–80	November 28, 1979	Colorado Rockies	Bill McKenzie	Own goal (Rob Ramage)	4–7	44:50, DP
Ron Hextall	Philadelphia Flyers	1987–88	December 8, 1987	Boston Bruins	Reggie Lemelin	SOG	5–2	58:48
Ron Hextall (2)	Philadelphia Flyers	1989 playoffs	April 11, 1989	Washington Capitals	Pete Peeters	SOG	8–5	58:58, SHG
Chris Osgood	Detroit Red Wings	1995–96	March 6, 1996	Hartford Whalers	Sean Burke	SOG	4–2	59:49
Martin Brodeur	New Jersey Devils	1997 playoffs	April 17, 1997	Montreal Canadiens	Jocelyn Thibault	SOG	5–2	59:15
Damian Rhodes	Ottawa Senators	1998–99	January 2, 1999	New Jersey Devils	Martin Brodeur	Own goal (Lyle Odelein)	6–0	08:14, DP
Martin Brodeur (2)	New Jersey Devils	1999–2000	February 15, 2000	Philadelphia Flyers	Brian Boucher	Own goal (Daymond Langkow)	4–2	49:43, GWG, DP
Jose Theodore	Montreal Canadiens	2000–01	January 2, 2001	New York Islanders	John Vanbiesbrouck	SOG	3–0	59:51
Evgeni Nabokov	San Jose Sharks	2001–02	March 10, 2002	Vancouver Canucks	Peter Skudra	SOG	7–4	59:12, PPG
Mika Noronen	Buffalo Sabres	2003–04	February 14, 2004	Toronto Maple Leafs	Trevor Kidd	Own goal (Robert Reichel)	6–4	59:17
Chris Mason	Nashville Predators	2005–06	April 15, 2006	Phoenix Coyotes	David LeNeveu	Own goal (Geoff Sanderson)	5–1	50:47, DP
Cam Ward	Carolina Hurricanes	2011–12	December 26, 2011	New Jersey Devils	Johan Hedberg	Own goal (Ilya Kovalchuk)	4–2	59:30
Martin Brodeur (3)	New Jersey Devils	2012–13	March 21, 2013	Carolina Hurricanes	Dan Ellis (Note: Ellis had not yet reached the bench to be replaced by an extra attacker during an attempt to return to stop the puck. The goal was therefore credited as an official goal against Ellis instead of an empty-net goal.)	Own goal (Jordan Staal)	4–1	03:54, PPG, DP
Mike Smith	Phoenix Coyotes	2013–14	October 19, 2013	Detroit Red Wings	Jimmy Howard	SOG	5–2	59:59 (Note: Replay footage confirmed that the goal was scored with 0.1 seconds remaining in the third period.)
Pekka Rinne	Nashville Predators	2019–20	January 9, 2020	Chicago Blackhawks	Corey Crawford	SOG	5–2	59:38
Linus Ullmark	Boston Bruins	2022–23	February 25, 2023	Vancouver Canucks	Arturs Silovs	SOG	3–1	59:12
Tristan Jarry	Pittsburgh Penguins	2023–24	November 30, 2023	Tampa Bay Lightning	Andrei Vasilevskiy	SOG	4–2	58:52
Filip Gustavsson	Minnesota Wild	2024–25	October 15, 2024	St. Louis Blues	Jordan Binnington	SOG	4–1	59:51, PPG
Alex Nedeljkovic	Pittsburgh Penguins	2024–25	January 17, 2025	Buffalo Sabres	Ukko-Pekka Luukkonen	SOG	5–2	57:18
Ilya Sorokin	New York Islanders	2024–25	March 1, 2025	Nashville Predators	Juuse Saros	Own goal (Steven Stamkos)	7–4	59:48
Igor Shesterkin	New York Rangers	2026–27	October 1, 2026	Tampa Bay Lightning	Andrei Vasilevskiy	SOG	5–1	57:26

== See also ==
- List of goalkeepers who have scored in association football

== Bibliography ==
- Allen, Kevin; Bower, Johnny (2002). Without Fear: Hockey's 50 greatest goaltenders. Chicago: Triumph Books. ISBN 978-1-57243-484-4. OCLC 49936232.
- Duplacey, James; Diamond, Dan (2000). The Official Rules of Hockey. Globe Pequot. ISBN 978-1-58574-052-9 – via Internet Archive.
- "NHL firsts and lasts—goaltenders to score". nhl.com. Archived from the original on January 7, 2010 – via Wayback Machine.
- Weir, Glenn (1999). Ultimate Hockey. Stoddart. ISBN 978-0-7737-6057-8 – via Internet Archive.
