= 2007–08 Detroit Red Wings season =

Sports season

2007–08 Detroit Red Wings
- Stanley Cup champions
- Presidents' Trophy winners
- Western Conference champions
- Central Division champions
- Division: 1st Central
- Conference: 1st Western
- 2007–08 record: 54–21–7
- Home record: 29–9–3
- Road record: 25–12–4
- Goals for: 257
- Goals against: 184

Team information
- General manager: Ken Holland
- Coach: Mike Babcock
- Captain: Nicklas Lidstrom
- Alternate captains: Pavel Datsyuk; Kris Draper; Henrik Zetterberg
- Arena: Joe Louis Arena
- Average attendance: 18,871 (94%)

Team leaders
- Goals: Henrik Zetterberg (43)
- Assists: Pavel Datsyuk (66)
- Points: Pavel Datsyuk (97)
- Penalty minutes: Aaron Downey (116)
- Plus/minus: Pavel Datsyuk (+41)
- Wins: Chris Osgood and Dominik Hasek (both 27)
- Goals against average: Chris Osgood (2.09)

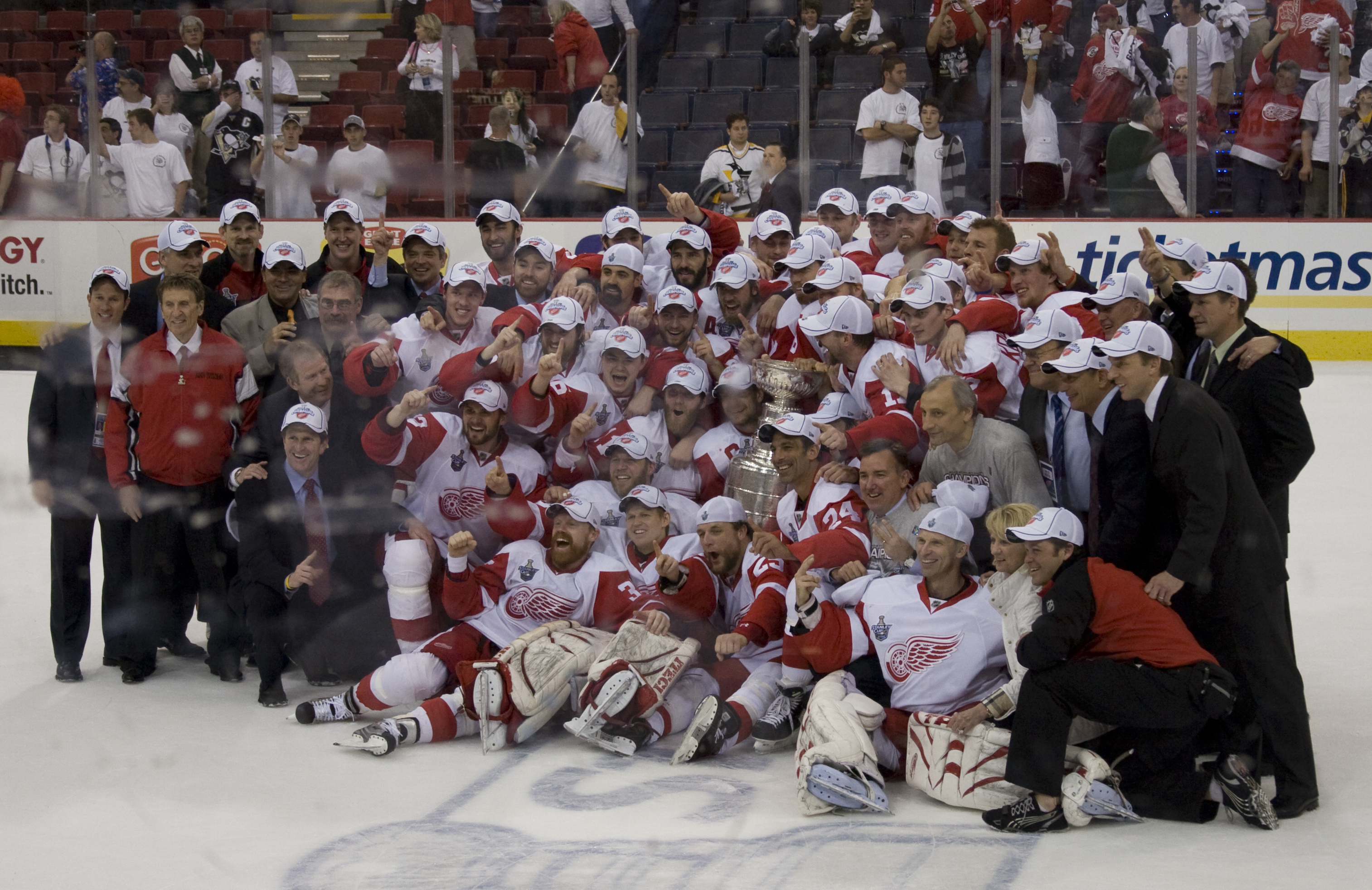
Detroit Red Wings celebrating their 2008 Stanley Cup victory.

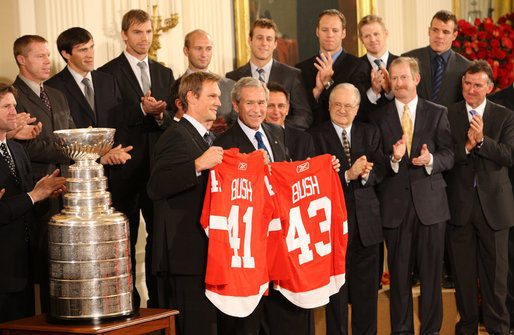
The 2008 Stanley Cup champion Red Wings present two jerseys to U.S. President George W. Bush.

The 2007–08 Detroit Red Wings season was the franchise's 76th season as the Red Wings and 82nd in the National Hockey League (NHL). The team won their eleventh Central Division title, sixth Presidents' Trophy, fifth Clarence S. Campbell Bowl, and won the Stanley Cup as league champion for the fourth time in eleven years. The team finished first in the Central Division and first in the Western Conference for their 17th consecutive playoff appearance and began the playoffs versus the Nashville Predators. The team won the first two games of the series at home but lost the next two at Nashville. In response to these losses, head coach Mike Babcock replaced starting goaltender Dominik Hasek with Chris Osgood. Osgood led the team to nine straight victories en route to a 14–4 record (and 16–6 overall team record) and a four games to two victory over the Pittsburgh Penguins in the 2008 Stanley Cup Finals.

Three Red Wings players represented the West at the 56th National Hockey League All-Star Game in Atlanta, Georgia. Goaltender Chris Osgood along with defenceman Nicklas Lidstrom and center Pavel Datsyuk were starters in the game. The Western Conference team was coached by Detroit Red Wings head coach Mike Babcock.

As of 2026, this is the most recent season that a Presidents' Trophy winner went on to also win the Stanley Cup in a full 82-game season, and the only time it has happened since the implementation of a salary cap as a result of the 2004–05 NHL lockout.

== Regular season ==
The Red Wings had the best goaltending in the League, allowing only 179 goals (excluding five shootout goals).

=== Divisional standings ===
Central Division
| | | GP | W | L | OTL | GF | GA | Pts |
|---|---|---|---|---|---|---|---|---|
| **1** | **p – Detroit Red Wings** | **82** | **54** | **21** | **7** | **257** | **184** | **115** |
| **2** | **Nashville Predators** | **82** | **41** | **32** | **9** | **230** | **229** | **91** |
| 3 | Chicago Blackhawks | 82 | 40 | 34 | 8 | 239 | 235 | 88 |
| 4 | Columbus Blue Jackets | 82 | 34 | 36 | 12 | 193 | 218 | 80 |
| 5 | St. Louis Blues | 82 | 33 | 36 | 13 | 205 | 237 | 79 |

=== Conference standings ===
Western Conference
| R | | Div | GP | W | L | OTL | GF | GA | Pts |
|---|---|---|---|---|---|---|---|---|---|
| **1** | **p – Detroit Red Wings** | **CE** | **82** | **54** | **21** | **7** | **257** | **184** | 115 |
| **2** | **y – San Jose Sharks** | **PA** | **82** | **49** | **23** | **10** | **222** | **193** | 108 |
| **3** | **y – Minnesota Wild** | **NW** | **82** | **44** | **28** | **10** | **223** | **218** | 98 |
| **4** | **Anaheim Ducks** | **PA** | **82** | **47** | **27** | **8** | **205** | **191** | 102 |
| **5** | **Dallas Stars** | **PA** | **82** | **45** | **30** | **7** | **242** | **207** | 97 |
| **6** | **Colorado Avalanche** | **NW** | **82** | **44** | **31** | **7** | **231** | **219** | 95 |
| **7** | **Calgary Flames** | **NW** | **82** | **42** | **30** | **10** | **229** | **227** | 94 |
| **8** | **Nashville Predators** | **CE** | **82** | **41** | **32** | **9** | **230** | **229** | 91 |
8.5
| 9 | Edmonton Oilers | NW | 82 | 41 | 35 | 6 | 235 | 251 | 88 |
| 10 | Chicago Blackhawks | CE | 82 | 40 | 34 | 8 | 239 | 235 | 88 |
| 11 | Vancouver Canucks | NW | 82 | 39 | 33 | 10 | 213 | 215 | 88 |
| 12 | Phoenix Coyotes | PA | 82 | 38 | 37 | 7 | 214 | 231 | 83 |
| 13 | Columbus Blue Jackets | CE | 82 | 34 | 36 | 12 | 193 | 218 | 80 |
| 14 | St. Louis Blues | CE | 82 | 33 | 36 | 13 | 205 | 237 | 79 |
| 15 | Los Angeles Kings | PA | 82 | 32 | 43 | 7 | 231 | 266 | 71 |

Divisions: PA – Pacific, CE – Central, NW – Northwest
bold – qualified for playoffs, y – division winner, p – Presidents' Trophy winner

== Playoffs ==
The 2007–08 season was Detroit's 17th consecutive playoff season. They ended the 2007–08 season as the first seed in the Western Conference.

Detroit wins the Stanley Cup for the 11th time, and first since 2002.

== Schedule and results ==
=== Regular season ===
2007–08 regular season
October: 10–2–1 (home: 5–1–0; road: 5–1–1)

| Game | Date | Visitor | Score | Home | OT | Decision | Attendance | Record | Points | Recap |
|---|---|---|---|---|---|---|---|---|---|---|
| 1 | October 3 | Anaheim | 2 – 3 | Detroit | SO | Hasek | 17,610 | 1–0–0 | 2 | W |
| 2 | October 6 | Detroit | 3 – 4 | Chicago | SO | Hasek | 18,768 | 1–0–1 | 3 | OTL |
| 3 | October 8 | Edmonton | 2 – 4 | Detroit | | Hasek | 16,913 | 2–0–1 | 5 | W |
| 4 | October 10 | Calgary | 2 – 4 | Detroit | | Osgood | 16,629 | 3–0–1 | 7 | W |
| 5 | October 12 | Chicago | 3 – 2 | Detroit | | Hasek | 17,696 | 3–1–1 | 7 | L |
| 6 | October 14 | Detroit | 4 – 1 | Los Angeles | | Osgood | 17,215 | 4–1–1 | 9 | W |
| 7 | October 15 | Detroit | 3 – 6 | Anaheim | | Hasek | 17,174 | 4–2–1 | 9 | L |
| 8 | October 18 | Detroit | 4 – 2 | San Jose | | Osgood | 17,496 | 5–2–1 | 11 | W |
| 9 | October 20 | Detroit | 5 – 2 | Phoenix | | Hasek | 14,154 | 6–2–1 | 13 | W |
| 10 | October 24 | Vancouver | 2 – 3 | Detroit | | Hasek | 17,015 | 7–2–1 | 15 | W |
| 11 | October 26 | San Jose | 1 – 5 | Detroit | | Osgood | 18,289 | 8–2–1 | 17 | W |
| 12 | October 28 | Detroit | 3 – 2 | Vancouver | | Osgood | 18,630 | 9–2–1 | 19 | W |
| 13 | October 30 | Detroit | 2 – 1 | Edmonton | | Osgood | 16,839 | 10–2–1 | 21 | W |

November: 7–4–1 (home: 5–1–0; road: 2–3–1)

| Game | Date | Visitor | Score | Home | OT | Decision | Attendance | Record | Points | Recap |
|---|---|---|---|---|---|---|---|---|---|---|
| 14 | November 1 | Detroit | 4 – 1 | Calgary | | Osgood | 19,289 | 11–2–1 | 23 | W |
| 15 | November 7 | Nashville | 2 – 3 | Detroit | SO | Osgood | 16,885 | 12–2–1 | 25 | W |
| 16 | November 9 | Columbus | 1 – 4 | Detroit | | Hasek | 18,654 | 13–2–1 | 27 | W |
| 17 | November 11 | Detroit | 2 – 3 | Chicago | | Osgood | 19,045 | 13–3–1 | 27 | L |
| 18 | November 13 | Detroit | 3 – 4 | St. Louis | | Hasek | 18,440 | 13–4–1 | 27 | L |
| 19 | November 17 | Chicago | 5 – 3 | Detroit | | Hasek | 20,066 | 13–5–1 | 27 | L |
| 20 | November 18 | Detroit | 5 – 4 | Columbus | SO | Osgood | 15,503 | 14–5–1 | 29 | W |
| 21 | November 21 | St. Louis | 0 – 3 | Detroit | | Osgood | 19,124 | 15–5–1 | 31 | W |
| 22 | November 22 | Detroit | 2 – 3 | Nashville | | Hasek | 14,346 | 15–6–1 | 31 | L |
| 23 | November 24 | Detroit | 2 – 3 | Columbus | SO | Osgood | 17,513 | 15–6–2 | 32 | OTL |
| 24 | November 27 | Calgary | 3 – 5 | Detroit | | Osgood | 17,108 | 16–6–2 | 34 | W |
| 25 | November 29 | Tampa Bay | 2 – 4 | Detroit | | Osgood | 17,001 | 17–6–2 | 36 | W |

December: 12–2–1 (home: 6–1–1; road: 6–1–0)

| Game | Date | Visitor | Score | Home | OT | Decision | Attendance | Record | Points | Recap |
|---|---|---|---|---|---|---|---|---|---|---|
| 26 | December 1 | Phoenix | 2 – 3 | Detroit | | Osgood | 18,557 | 18–6–2 | 38 | W |
| 27 | December 4 | Detroit | 4 – 1 | Montreal | | Hasek | 21,273 | 19–6–2 | 40 | W |
| 28 | December 7 | Minnesota | 0 – 5 | Detroit | | Hasek | 19,508 | 20–6–2 | 42 | W |
| 29 | December 9 | Carolina | 2 – 5 | Detroit | | Hasek | 19,609 | 21–6–2 | 44 | W |
| 30 | December 10 | Detroit | 2 – 1 | Nashville | | Osgood | 15,056 | 22–6–2 | 46 | W |
| 31 | December 13 | Edmonton | 4 – 3 | Detroit | SO | Hasek | 18,859 | 22–6–3 | 47 | OTL |
| 32 | December 15 | Florida | 2 – 5 | Detroit | | Osgood | 20,066 | 23–6–3 | 49 | W |
| 33 | December 17 | Washington | 3 – 4 | Detroit | SO | Hasek | 19,483 | 24–6–3 | 51 | W |
| 34 | December 19 | Los Angeles | 2 – 6 | Detroit | | Hasek | 19,516 | 25–6–3 | 53 | W |
| 35 | December 20 | Detroit | 2 – 3 | St. Louis | | Osgood | 19,150 | 25–7–3 | 53 | L |
| 36 | December 22 | Detroit | 4 – 1 | Minnesota | | Hasek | 18,568 | 26–7–3 | 55 | W |
| 37 | December 26 | Detroit | 5 – 0 | St. Louis | | Osgood | 19,250 | 27–7–3 | 57 | W |
| 38 | December 27 | Detroit | 4 – 2 | Colorado | | Hasek | 18,007 | 28–7–3 | 59 | W |
| 39 | December 29 | Detroit | 4 – 2 | Phoenix | | Osgood | 17,866 | 29–7–3 | 61 | W |
| 40 | December 31 | St. Louis | 2 – 0 | Detroit | | Hasek | 20,066 | 29–8–3 | 61 | L |

January: 9–2–1 (home: 4–1–1; road: 5–1–0)

| Game | Date | Visitor | Score | Home | OT | Decision | Attendance | Record | Points | Recap |
|---|---|---|---|---|---|---|---|---|---|---|
| 41 | January 2 | Dallas | 1 – 4 | Detroit | | Osgood | 20,066 | 30–8–3 | 63 | W |
| 42 | January 5 | Detroit | 3 – 0 | Dallas | | Hasek | 18,584 | 31–8–3 | 65 | W |
| 43 | January 6 | Detroit | 3 – 1 | Chicago | | Osgood | 21,869 | 32–8–3 | 67 | W |
| 44 | January 8 | Colorado | 0 – 1 | Detroit | | Hasek | 19,160 | 33–8–3 | 69 | W |
| 45 | January 10 | Minnesota | 6 – 5 | Detroit | SO | Osgood | 17,848 | 33–8–4 | 70 | OTL |
| 46 | January 12 | Detroit | 2 – 3 | Ottawa | | Hasek | 20,208 | 33–9–4 | 70 | L |
| 47 | January 15 | Atlanta | 5 – 1 | Detroit | | Osgood | 17,408 | 33–10–4 | 70 | L |
| 48 | January 17 | Vancouver | 2 – 3 | Detroit | SO | Hasek | 18,878 | 34–10–4 | 72 | W |
| 49 | January 19 | Detroit | 6 – 3 | San Jose | | Hasek | 17,496 | 35–10–4 | 74 | W |
| 50 | January 22 | Detroit | 3 – 0 | Los Angeles | | Osgood | 18,118 | 36–10–4 | 76 | W |
| 51 | January 23 | Detroit | 2 – 1 | Anaheim | | Hasek | 17,174 | 37–10–4 | 78 | W |
| 52 | January 30 | Phoenix | 2 – 3 | Detroit | | Osgood | 19,289 | 38–10–4 | 80 | W |

February: 4–8–2 (home: 1–4–0; road: 3–4–2)

| Game | Date | Visitor | Score | Home | OT | Decision | Attendance | Record | Points | Recap |
|---|---|---|---|---|---|---|---|---|---|---|
| 53 | February 1 | Colorado | 0 – 2 | Detroit | | Hasek | 20,066 | 39–10–4 | 82 | W |
| 54 | February 2 | Detroit | 3 – 1 | Boston | | Osgood | 17,565 | 40–10–4 | 84 | W |
| 55 | February 5 | Detroit | 3 – 2 | Minnesota | OT | Hasek | 18,568 | 41–10–4 | 86 | W |
| 56 | February 7 | Los Angeles | 5 – 3 | Detroit | | Osgood | 18,852 | 41–11–4 | 86 | L |
| 57 | February 9 | Detroit | 2 – 3 | Toronto | OT | Hasek | 19,510 | 41–11–5 | 87 | OTL |
| 58 | February 10 | Anaheim | 3 – 2 | Detroit | | Osgood | 20,066 | 41–12–5 | 87 | L |
| 59 | February 12 | Detroit | 2 – 4 | Nashville | | Osgood | 15,692 | 41–13–5 | 87 | L |
| 60 | February 15 | Columbus | 5 – 1 | Detroit | | Osgood | 20,066 | 41–14–5 | 87 | L |
| 61 | February 17 | Detroit | 0 – 1 | Dallas | | Howard | 18,584 | 41–15–5 | 87 | L |
| 62 | February 18 | Detroit | 4 – 0 | Colorado | | Osgood | 18,007 | 42–15–5 | 89 | W |
| 63 | February 22 | Detroit | 0 – 1 | Calgary | | Osgood | 19,289 | 42–16–5 | 89 | L |
| 64 | February 23 | Detroit | 1 – 4 | Vancouver | | Howard | 18,630 | 42–17–5 | 89 | L |
| 65 | February 26 | Detroit | 3 – 4 | Edmonton | SO | Osgood | 16,839 | 42–17–6 | 90 | OTL |
| 66 | February 29 | San Jose | 3 – 2 | Detroit | | Hasek | 20,066 | 42–18–6 | 90 | L |

March: 10–2–1 (home: 7–1–1; road: 3–1–0)

| Game | Date | Visitor | Score | Home | OT | Decision | Attendance | Record | Points | Recap |
|---|---|---|---|---|---|---|---|---|---|---|
| 67 | March 2 | Detroit | 4 – 2 | Buffalo | | Hasek | 18,690 | 43–18–6 | 92 | W |
| 68 | March 5 | St. Louis | 1 – 2 | Detroit | | Hasek | 18,064 | 44–18–6 | 94 | W |
| 69 | March 9 | Nashville | 3 – 4 | Detroit | | Hasek | 20,066 | 45–18–6 | 96 | W |
| 70 | March 11 | Chicago | 1 – 3 | Detroit | | Osgood | 18,632 | 46–18–6 | 98 | W |
| 71 | March 13 | Dallas | 3 – 5 | Detroit | | Osgood | 19,453 | 47–18–6 | 100 | W |
| 72 | March 15 | Nashville | 3 – 1 | Detroit | | Osgood | 20,066 | 47–19–6 | 100 | L |
| 73 | March 16 | Detroit | 3 – 4 | Columbus | | Hasek | 18,188 | 47–20–6 | 100 | L |
| 74 | March 19 | Columbus | 1 – 3 | Detroit | | Osgood | 19,061 | 48–20–6 | 102 | W |
| 75 | March 20 | Detroit | 6 – 3 | Nashville | | Hasek | 17,113 | 49–20–6 | 104 | W |
| 76 | March 22 | Detroit | 4 – 1 | Columbus | | Hasek | 17,681 | 50–20–6 | 106 | W |
| 77 | March 25 | Detroit | 2 – 1 | St. Louis | | Osgood | 19,150 | 51–20–6 | 108 | W |
| 78 | March 28 | St. Louis | 4 – 3 | Detroit | OT | Osgood | 20,066 | 51–20–7 | 109 | OTL |
| 79 | March 30 | Nashville | 0 – 1 | Detroit | OT | Hasek | 20,066 | 52–20–7 | 111 | W |

April: 2–1–0 (home: 2–0–0; road: 0–1–0)

| Game | Date | Visitor | Score | Home | OT | Decision | Attendance | Record | Points | Recap |
|---|---|---|---|---|---|---|---|---|---|---|
| 80 | April 2 | Detroit | 2 – 6 | Chicago | | Hasek | 21,365 | 52–21–7 | 111 | L |
| 81 | April 3 | Columbus | 2 – 3 | Detroit | | Hasek | 19,435 | 53–21–7 | 113 | W |
| 82 | April 6 | Chicago | 1 – 4 | Detroit | | Hasek | 20,066 | 54–21–7 | 115 | W |

Legend: W Win (2 points) L Loss (0 points) OTL Overtime/shootout loss (1 point)

=== Playoffs ===
2008 Stanley Cup playoffs
Western Conference Quarterfinals: vs. (8) Nashville Predators — Detroit wins 4–2

| Game | Date | Visitor | Score | Home | OT | Decision | Attendance | Series | Recap |
|---|---|---|---|---|---|---|---|---|---|
| 1 | April 10 | Nashville | 1 – 3 | Detroit | | Hasek | 20,066 | 1 – 0 | W |
| 2 | April 12 | Nashville | 2 – 4 | Detroit | | Hasek | 20,066 | 2 – 0 | W |
| 3 | April 14 | Detroit | 3 – 5 | Nashville | | Hasek | 17,113 | 2 – 1 | L |
| 4 | April 16 | Detroit | 2 – 3 | Nashville | | Hasek | 17,113 | 2 – 2 | L |
| 5 | April 18 | Nashville | 1 – 2 | Detroit | 1OT | Osgood | 20,066 | 3 – 2 | W |
| 6 | April 20 | Detroit | 3 – 0 | Nashville | | Osgood | 17,113 | 4 – 2 | W |

Western Conference Semifinals: vs. (6) Colorado Avalanche — Detroit wins 4–0

| Game | Date | Visitor | Score | Home | OT | Decision | Attendance | Series | Recap |
|---|---|---|---|---|---|---|---|---|---|
| 1 | April 24 | Colorado | 3 – 4 | Detroit | | Osgood | 20,066 | 1 – 0 | W |
| 2 | April 26 | Colorado | 1 – 5 | Detroit | | Osgood | 20,066 | 2 – 0 | W |
| 3 | April 29 | Detroit | 4 – 3 | Colorado | | Osgood | 18,007 | 3 – 0 | W |
| 4 | May 1 | Detroit | 8 – 2 | Colorado | | Osgood | 18,007 | 4 – 0 | W |

Western Conference Finals: vs. (5) Dallas Stars — Detroit wins 4–2

| Game | Date | Visitor | Score | Home | OT | Decision | Attendance | Series | Recap |
|---|---|---|---|---|---|---|---|---|---|
| 1 | May 8 | Dallas | 1 – 4 | Detroit | | Osgood | 20,066 | 1 – 0 | W |
| 2 | May 10 | Dallas | 1 – 2 | Detroit | | Osgood | 20,066 | 2 – 0 | W |
| 3 | May 12 | Detroit | 5 – 2 | Dallas | | Osgood | 18,532 | 3 – 0 | W |
| 4 | May 14 | Detroit | 1 – 3 | Dallas | | Osgood | 18,532 | 3 – 1 | L |
| 5 | May 17 | Dallas | 2 – 1 | Detroit | | Osgood | 20,066 | 3 – 2 | L |
| 6 | May 19 | Detroit | 4 – 1 | Dallas | | Osgood | 18,532 | 4 – 2 | W |

Stanley Cup Finals: vs. (E2) Pittsburgh Penguins — Detroit wins 4–2

| Game | Date | Visitor | Score | Home | OT | Decision | Attendance | Series | Recap |
|---|---|---|---|---|---|---|---|---|---|
| 1 | May 24 | Pittsburgh | 0 – 4 | Detroit | | Osgood | 20,066 | 1 – 0 | W |
| 2 | May 26 | Pittsburgh | 0 – 3 | Detroit | | Osgood | 20,066 | 2 – 0 | W |
| 3 | May 28 | Detroit | 2 – 3 | Pittsburgh | | Osgood | 17,132 | 2 – 1 | L |
| 4 | May 31 | Detroit | 2 – 1 | Pittsburgh | | Osgood | 17,132 | 3 – 1 | W |
| 5 | June 2 | Pittsburgh | 4 – 3 | Detroit | 3OT | Osgood | 20,066 | 3 – 2 | L |
| 6 | June 4 | Detroit | 3 – 2 | Pittsburgh | | Osgood | 17,132 | 4 – 2 | W |

Legend: W Win L Loss

== 2008 National Hockey League All-Star Game ==
The 2008 National Hockey League All-Star Game took place on January 27, 2008, at Philips Arena in Atlanta, Georgia. The Eastern Conference defeated the Western Conference 8–7. The following are Red Wings players who participated in the all-star game.

- Mike Babcock (Head Coach, Western Conference)
- Chris Osgood (Starting Goaltender, Western Conference)
- Niklas Lidstrom (Defense Starter, Western Conference)
- Pavel Datsyuk (Forward Starter, Western Conference)

== Player statistics ==
=== Skaters ===
Note: GP = Games played; G = Goals; A = Assists; Pts = Points; +/- = Plus/Minus; PIM = Penalties in Minutes

Regular Season

| Player | GP | G | A | Pts | +/- | PIM |
|---|---|---|---|---|---|---|
| Pavel Datsyuk | 82 | 31 | 66 | 97 | 41 | 20 |
| Henrik Zetterberg | 75 | 43 | 49 | 92 | 30 | 34 |
| Nicklas Lidstrom | 76 | 10 | 60 | 70 | 40 | 40 |
| Brian Rafalski | 73 | 13 | 42 | 55 | 27 | 34 |
| Daniel Cleary | 63 | 20 | 22 | 42 | 21 | 33 |
| Jiri Hudler | 81 | 13 | 29 | 42 | 11 | 26 |
| Tomas Holmstrom | 59 | 20 | 20 | 40 | 9 | 58 |
| Mikael Samuelsson | 73 | 11 | 29 | 40 | 21 | 26 |
| Johan Franzen | 72 | 27 | 11 | 38 | 12 | 51 |
| Valtteri Filppula | 78 | 19 | 17 | 36 | 16 | 28 |

Playoffs

| Player | GP | G | A | Pts | +/- | PIM |
|---|---|---|---|---|---|---|
| Henrik Zetterberg | 22 | 13 | 14 | 27 | 16 | 16 |
| Pavel Datsyuk | 22 | 10 | 13 | 23 | 13 | 6 |
| Johan Franzen | 16 | 13 | 5 | 18 | 13 | 14 |
| Niklas Kronwall | 22 | 0 | 15 | 15 | 16 | 18 |
| Jiri Hudler | 22 | 5 | 9 | 14 | -1 | 14 |
| Brian Rafalski | 22 | 4 | 10 | 14 | 6 | 12 |
| Nicklas Lidstrom | 22 | 3 | 10 | 13 | 8 | 14 |
| Mikael Samuelsson | 22 | 5 | 8 | 13 | 8 | 8 |
| Tomas Holmstrom | 22 | 4 | 8 | 12 | 4 | 26 |
| Valtteri Filppula | 22 | 5 | 6 | 11 | 7 | 2 |

=== Goaltenders ===
Note: GP = Games played; TOI = Time on ice (minutes); W = Wins; L = Losses; OT = Overtime/shootout losses; GA = Goals against; SO = Shutouts; Sv% = Save percentage; GAA = Goals against average

Regular season

| Player | GP | TOI | W | L | OT | GA | SO | Sv% | GAA |
|---|---|---|---|---|---|---|---|---|---|
| Chris Osgood | 43 | 2409 | 27 | 9 | 4 | 84 | 4 | .914 | 2.09 |
| Dominik Hasek | 41 | 2350 | 27 | 10 | 3 | 84 | 5 | .902 | 2.14 |
| Jimmy Howard | 4 | 197 | 0 | 2 | 0 | 7 | 0 | .926 | 2.13 |

Playoffs

| Player | GP | TOI | W | L | GA | SO | Sv% | GAA |
|---|---|---|---|---|---|---|---|---|
| Chris Osgood | 19 | 1160 | 14 | 4 | 30 | 3 | .930 | 1.55 |
| Dominik Hasek | 4 | 206 | 2 | 2 | 10 | 0 | .888 | 2.91 |

== Awards and records ==
=== Milestones ===
Regular Season
| Team member | Milestone | Date |
| Tomas Holmstrom | 700th NHL Game | October 3, 2007 |
| Kris Draper | 300th NHL Point | October 12, 2007 |
| Tomas Kopecky | 1st NHL Assist | October 12, 2007 |
| Niklas Kronwall | 100th NHL PIM | October 12, 2007 |
| Matt Ellis | 1st NHL Assist; 1st NHL Point | October 15, 2007 |
| Matt Ellis | 1st NHL Goal | October 18, 2007 |
| Jiri Hudler | 100th NHL Game | October 18, 2007 |
| Pavel Datsyuk | 100th NHL PIM | October 20, 2007 |
| Dominik Hasek | 700th NHL Game | October 20, 2007 |
| Mike Babcock | 200th NHL Career Win | December 15, 2007 |
| Nicklas Lidstrom | 700th NHL Assist | January 2, 2008 |
| Chris Chelios | 1600th NHL Game | February 10, 2008 |
| Pavel Datsyuk | 400th NHL Point | February 18, 2008 |
| Dallas Drake | 1000th NHL Game; 300th NHL Assist | March 11, 2008 |

Playoffs
| Player | Milestone/Record | Date |
| Chris Chelios | 248th NHL Playoff Game (Most NHL playoff games by any player in history. Broke the record held by Hall of Fame goaltender Patrick Roy).; Became oldest player to have his name engraved on the Stanley Cup (47 years, 4 months and 11 days), after Lester Patrick | April 12, 2008; June 4, 2008 |
| Nicklas Lidstrom | 197th NHL Playoff Game for the Red Wings, breaking Steve Yzerman's franchise record. | April 18, 2008 |
| Nicklas Lidstrom | 100th NHL Playoff Assist. | April 29, 2008 |
| Johan Franzen | His 11 goals are one more than the previous club playoff record shared by Petr Klima (1988), Sergei Fedorov (1998) and Brett Hull (2002). Franzen did it in fewer games (10) than anybody else.; Nine goals in one series broke the club mark held by Gordie Howe (eight vs. Montreal Canadiens in 1949) and established an NHL record for a four-game series.; First player to record two hat tricks in one playoff series since Edmonton Oilers Jari Kurri notched three vs. Chicago Blackhawks in 1985.; First Red Wing to record two hat tricks in one series since Norm Ullman in 1964 vs. Chicago Blackhawks. | May 1, 2008 |
| Chris Osgood | 48th NHL Playoff Win, breaking franchise record held by Hall of Fame goaltender Terry Sawchuk. | May 19, 2008 |
| Niklas Lidstrom | First player born and trained in Europe to captain a Stanley Cup winning team. | June 4, 2008 |
| Henrik Zetterberg | 27 Playoff Points in a year, breaking franchise record held by Steve Yzerman and Sergei Fedorov (24 Points).; 13 Playoff Goals. Tied with Johan Franzen for the franchise record by scoring the Cup winning goal. | June 4, 2008 |
| Niklas Kronwall | 15 Playoff Assists in a year, breaking franchise record held by Niklas Lidstrom and Chris Chelios (13 Assists). | June 4, 2008 |
| Niklas Kronwall, Mikael Samuelsson, Henrik Zetterberg | Joined the Triple Gold Club. | June 4, 2008 |
| Pavel Datsyuk | Got the first hat trick of his career against Dallas in game three of the Western Conference Finals in the 2007–2008 season. | May 12, 2008 |

== Transactions ==
The Red Wings have been involved in the following transactions during the 2007–08 season.

=== Trades ===
| February 8, 2008 | To Montreal Canadiens | To Detroit Red Wings |
| February 8, 2008 | Brett Engelhardt | Francis Lemieux |
| February 8, 2008 | To Los Angeles Kings | To Detroit Red Wings |
| February 26, 2008 | Brad Stuart | 2nd-round pick in 2008 4th-round pick in 2009 |

=== Free agents ===
| Date | Player | Former team | Contract terms |
| July 1, 2007 | Brian Rafalski | New Jersey Devils | 5 years, $30 million |
| July 3, 2007 | Adam Berkhoel | Atlanta Thrashers | 1 year, $500,000 |
| July 3, 2007 | Brad Ference | Calgary Flames | 1 year, $500,000 |
| July 5, 2007 | Mark Cullen | Philadelphia Flyers | 1 year, $500,000 |
| July 9, 2007 | Dallas Drake | St. Louis Blues | 1 year, $550,000 |
| July 16, 2007 | Carl Corazzini | Chicago Blackhawks | 1 year, $475,000 |
| July 16, 2007 | Randall Gelech | Phoenix Coyotes | 2 years, $975,000 |
| July 16, 2007 | Mark Hartigan | Anaheim Ducks | 1 year, $550,000 |
| July 16, 2007 | Garrett Stafford | San Jose Sharks | 1 year, $500,000 |
| October 3, 2007 | Aaron Downey | Montreal Canadiens | 1 year, $525,000 |

| Player | New team |
| Mathieu Schneider | Anaheim Ducks |
| Robert Lang | Chicago Blackhawks |
| Kyle Calder | Los Angeles Kings |
| Todd Bertuzzi | Anaheim Ducks |
| Darryl Bootland | New York Islanders |
| Matt Hussey | Colorado Avalanche |
| Brad Norton | San Jose Sharks |

== Draft picks ==
Detroit's picks at the 2007 NHL entry draft in Columbus, Ohio.

| Round | # | Player | Position | Nationality | College/Junior/Club team (League) |
|---|---|---|---|---|---|
| 1 | 27 | Brendan Smith | Defenseman | Canada | St. Michael's Buzzers (OPHL) |
| 3 | 88 | Joakim Andersson | Center | Sweden | Frölunda HC (Swe Jr.) |
| 5 | 148 | Randy Cameron | Center | Canada | Moncton Wildcats (QMJHL) |
| 6 | 178 | Zack Torquato | Center | Canada | Erie Otters (OHL) |
| 7 | 208 | Bryan Rufenach | Defenseman | Canada | Lindsay Muskies (OPJHL) |

== Farm teams ==
=== Grand Rapids Griffins ===
The Grand Rapids Griffins remain Detroit's American Hockey League affiliate in 2007–08.

== See also ==
- 2007–08 NHL season
