= Dallas Drake =

Canadian ice hockey player (born 1969)

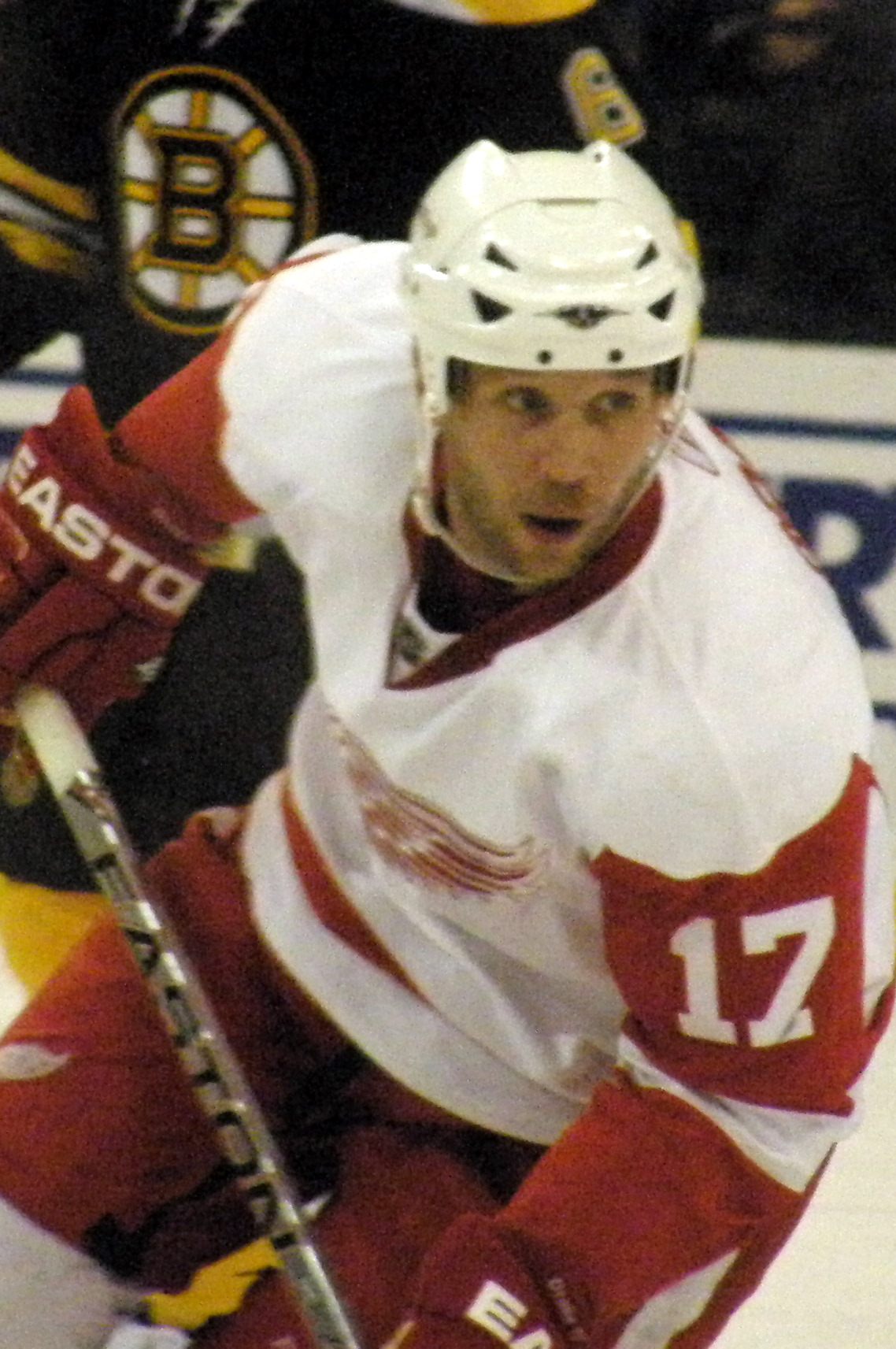
- Drake with the Detroit Red Wings in 2008
- Born: February 4, 1969 (age 57) Trail, British Columbia, Canada
- Height: 6 ft 0 in (183 cm)
- Weight: 185 lb (84 kg; 13 st 3 lb)
- Position: Center/Right Wing
- Shot: Left
- Played for: Detroit Red Wings; St. Louis Blues; Winnipeg Jets/Phoenix Coyotes
- NHL draft: 116th overall, 1989; Detroit Red Wings
- Playing career: 1992–2008

Dallas James Drake (born February 4, 1969) is a Canadian former professional ice hockey winger in the National Hockey League (NHL) who began and ended his career playing for the Detroit Red Wings, the team that drafted him. In his last season, the Red Wings made it to and beat the Pittsburgh Penguins in six games in the 2008 Stanley Cup Final, enabling him to end his career with his first and only Stanley Cup championship. Team captain Nicklas Lidström handed the Cup to Drake first to skate with above his head as recognition of how long he waited to win the Cup.

Previously, Drake played for the Winnipeg Jets/Phoenix Coyotes, and St. Louis Blues. Drake played his college hockey at Northern Michigan University.

== Playing career ==
Dallas Drake was drafted by the Detroit Red Wings in the 1989 NHL entry draft in the 6th round, 116th overall. During his junior year at Northern Michigan, he was a key factor in the team winning the 1991 NCAA Men's Ice Hockey Championship. In the final game, NMU captain Darryl Plandowski scored the winning goal as the Wildcats defeated Boston University 8–7 in triple overtime.

Following a stellar four-year college career, Drake made the Red Wings roster out of training camp without playing in the minor leagues. He enjoyed a fine rookie season in 1992–93, posting 44 points on 18 goals and 26 assists. The following year, he was part of a trade that saw him shipped to the Winnipeg Jets along with goaltender Tim Cheveldae. The Red Wings received goaltender Bob Essensa and defenceman Sergei Bautin in return. The trade was regrettable for the Wings, as Essensa appeared in only 13 games and was not a factor in the playoffs. Bautin would only appear in one game for the Red Wings. Drake went on to have a successful role on the checking lines and penalty kill units of the Winnipeg/Phoenix Coyotes organization.

During Drake's time with the Coyotes, Phoenix-area band, Stone Bogart, wrote and recorded the song "Dallas Drake," depicting many great moments by the player and clipping various radio broadcasts. The song was used on ESPN and ABC broadcasts of NHL games for the few years following the song's release.

Drake was known as a tenacious skater and a tough customer in the corners throughout his 16-year career. Although he wasn't a prolific goal scorer as a pro like he was in college, his knowledge of the game, leadership and fierce competitiveness allowed him to skate in 1009 NHL games. Since 1992, he was sent to the minor leagues only once. In the 1993–1994 season, Drake skated one game in Adirondack on a rehab assignment, scoring two goals before returning to Detroit the following day and finishing with 10 goals and 22 assists.

Drake signed with the St. Louis Blues for the 2000–01 season, and remained with the organization for six seasons. He achieved his career high in goals with 20 during the 2002–03 season, and was named captain for the 2005–06 and 2006–07 seasons.

Drake was placed on waivers by the Blues on June 26, 2007 with the purpose of buying out his contract.

On July 9, 2007, he was signed as an unrestricted free agent by the Red Wings to a one-year, $550,000 contract. He had considered ending his professional career with other NHL teams, but chose to return to Detroit in hopes of winning the Stanley Cup with the club that had drafted him over 16 years prior. On June 4, 2008 those dreams were realized when Detroit defeated the Pittsburgh Penguins to win their 11th franchise Stanley Cup championship. During the on ice post-game celebrations Detroit captain Nicklas Lidström passed the Stanley Cup to Drake first.

On July 15, 2008, Drake announced his retirement from the NHL.

== Personal ==
Drake was born in Trail, British Columbia, but grew up in Rossland.

Drake and his wife Amy reside in Traverse City, Michigan with their four children.

His daughter Delaney previously played for the Wisconsin Badgers women's ice hockey team from 2014 to 2018. She was a member of the US squad that captured the gold medal at the 2017 IIHF World Women's U18 Championship. In addition, she scored a goal for the US in the gold medal game. His other daughter Darby is on the University of Nebraska Omaha swimming & diving team.

Drake was inducted into the Northern Michigan University Hall of Fame in 2002.

== Career statistics ==
			Regular season					Playoffs
Season	Team	League	GP	G	A	Pts	PIM	GP	G	A	Pts	PIM
1987–88	Vernon Lakers	BCHL	47	39	85	124	50	11	9	17	26	30
1988–89	Northern Michigan University	WCHA	45	18	24	42	26	—	—	—	—	—
1989–90	Northern Michigan University	WCHA	36	13	24	37	42	—	—	—	—	—
1990–91	Northern Michigan University	WCHA	44	22	36	58	89	—	—	—	—	—
1991–92	Northern Michigan University	WCHA	40	39	44	83	58	—	—	—	—	—
1992–93	Detroit Red Wings	NHL	72	18	26	44	93	7	3	3	6	6
1993–94	Detroit Red Wings	NHL	47	10	22	32	37	—	—	—	—	—
1993–94	Adirondack Red Wings	AHL	1	2	0	2	0	—	—	—	—	—
1993–94	Winnipeg Jets	NHL	15	3	5	8	12	—	—	—	—	—
1994–95	Winnipeg Jets	NHL	43	8	18	26	30	—	—	—	—	—
1995–96	Winnipeg Jets	NHL	69	19	20	39	36	3	0	0	0	0
1996–97	Phoenix Coyotes	NHL	63	17	19	36	52	7	0	1	1	2
1997–98	Phoenix Coyotes	NHL	60	11	29	40	71	4	0	1	1	2
1998–99	Phoenix Coyotes	NHL	53	9	22	31	65	7	4	3	7	4
1999–2000	Phoenix Coyotes	NHL	79	15	30	45	62	5	0	1	1	4
2000–01	St. Louis Blues	NHL	82	12	29	41	71	15	4	2	6	16
2001–02	St. Louis Blues	NHL	80	11	15	26	87	8	0	0	0	8
2002–03	St. Louis Blues	NHL	80	20	10	30	66	7	1	4	5	23
2003–04	St. Louis Blues	NHL	79	13	22	35	65	5	1	1	2	2
2005–06	St. Louis Blues	NHL	62	2	24	26	59	—	—	—	—	—
2006–07	St. Louis Blues	NHL	60	6	6	12	38	—	—	—	—	—
2007–08	Detroit Red Wings	NHL	65	3	3	6	41	22	1	3	4	12
NHL totals			1,009	177	300	477	885	90	14	19	33	79

== Awards and honors ==
- Stanley Cup champion (2008)

== See also ==
- Captain (ice hockey)
- List of NHL players with 1,000 games played

Awards and achievements
Preceded by Award Created	WCHA Defensive Player of the Year; 1991–92	Succeeded by Chris Hynnes
Sporting positions
Preceded by Al MacInnis	St. Louis Blues captain 2005–07	Succeeded by Eric Brewer
