= 2008 Stanley Cup Final =

2008 ice hockey championship series

	1	2	3	4	5	6	Total
Detroit Red Wings	4	3	2	2	3***	3	4
Pittsburgh Penguins	0	0	3	1	4***	2	2
- * – Denotes overtime period(s)
- Location(s): Detroit: Joe Louis Arena (1, 2, 5); Pittsburgh: Mellon Arena (3, 4, 6)
- Coaches: Detroit: Mike Babcock; Pittsburgh: Michel Therrien
- Captains: Detroit: Nicklas Lidstrom; Pittsburgh: Sidney Crosby
- National anthems: Detroit: Karen Newman; Pittsburgh: Jeff Jimerson
- Referees: Paul Devorski (1, 3, 5); Dan O'Halloran (1, 3, 5); Marc Joannette (2, 4, 6); Brad Watson (2, 4 ,6)
- Dates: May 24 – June 4, 2008
- MVP: Henrik Zetterberg (Red Wings)
- Series-winning goal: Henrik Zetterberg (7:36, third)
- Hall of Famers: Red Wings: Chris Chelios (2013; did not play); Pavel Datsyuk (2024); Dominik Hasek (2014; did not play); Nicklas Lidstrom (2015); Penguins: Marian Hossa (2020)
- Networks: Canada: (English): CBC (French): RDS; United States: (English): Versus (1–2), NBC (3–6)
- Announcers: (CBC) Bob Cole and Greg Millen (RDS) Pierre Houde and Yvon Pedneault (Versus/NBC) Mike Emrick and Eddie Olczyk (NHL International) Dave Strader and Joe Micheletti

The 2008 Stanley Cup Final was the championship series of the National Hockey League's (NHL) 2007–08 season, and the culmination of the 2008 Stanley Cup playoffs. It was contested between the Western Conference champion Detroit Red Wings and the Eastern Conference champion Pittsburgh Penguins. This was Detroit's 23rd appearance in the Finals, and its first since winning the Cup in 2002. This was Pittsburgh's third appearance in the Finals, and its first since winning consecutive Cup championships in 1991 and 1992. The Red Wings defeated the Penguins in six games to win their eleventh Stanley Cup title. Detroit's Henrik Zetterberg was awarded the Conn Smythe Trophy as the Most Valuable Player of the playoffs. As of 2026, this is the most recent major professional sports championship won by a Detroit-based team.

This was also the first Cup Finals between two United States–based NHL teams since 2003, and the last one until 2026 in which neither team played a Game 7 in an earlier round of that season’s playoffs.

In the United States, Versus televised games one and two, and NBC broadcast the rest of the series. It was broadcast in Canada on CBC in English and on RDS in French. In the United Kingdom, all games were aired live on Five, and on the cable sports channel NASN. The series was also broadcast by NHL Radio via Westwood One.

== Paths to the Finals ==
=== Detroit Red Wings ===
The Detroit Red Wings entered the Finals after winning the Presidents' Trophy as the team that had the best record during the regular season. Led by forwards Henrik Zetterberg, Pavel Datsyuk, and Johan Franzen, Detroit scored 55 goals in the first three rounds of the playoffs. With struggling goaltender Dominik Hasek being replaced mid-series by Chris Osgood, the Red Wings defeated their division rival Nashville Predators in the Western Conference quarterfinals, in six games. The team swept the Colorado Avalanche in the Western Conference semifinals, in which Franzen scored nine goals – tying with the entire Avalanche squad, who also scored nine goals in the series. The Red Wings then defeated the Dallas Stars in six games to win their fifth Clarence S. Campbell Bowl in franchise history.

=== Pittsburgh Penguins ===
The Pittsburgh Penguins entered the championship series after winning the Atlantic Division and earning the second-best regular season record in the Eastern Conference. The team was led by Sidney Crosby; missing 29 games throughout the regular season because of an ankle injury, the captain returned to lead the first three rounds of the playoffs in assists, and to tie for the lead in points heading into the Stanley Cup Final. Goaltender Marc-Andre Fleury recorded three shutouts throughout the playoffs, to lead the league in that category. Evgeni Malkin and Marian Hossa each recorded nine goals and ten assists throughout the playoffs. The Penguins swept the Ottawa Senators in the Eastern Conference quarterfinals, a reversal of the series of the previous season when Ottawa beat Pittsburgh 4–1. In the Eastern Conference semifinals, the Penguins defeated division rival the New York Rangers, in five games. The team won the Prince of Wales Trophy by defeating another division rival, their in-state rivals, and another fierce rival of the Rangers, the Philadelphia Flyers, also in five games.

== Game summaries ==
The 2008 Stanley Cup Final marked the first time that the Detroit Red Wings and the Pittsburgh Penguins met in postseason play, and the first time since the 1909 World Series that professional sports teams from Detroit and Pittsburgh met in a postseason series or game. The Red Wings and Penguins did not play each other during the 2007–08 regular season.

=== Game one ===
May 24	Pittsburgh Penguins	0–4	Detroit Red Wings	Joe Louis Arena	Recap

Pittsburgh's Gary Roberts and Detroit's Chris Chelios were both healthy scratches for game one. Prior to the game, a ceremonial faceoff featuring former Pittsburgh captain and current team chairman Mario Lemieux and former Detroit captain and team vice president at the time Steve Yzerman. Each dropped a puck to their current captains Sidney Crosby and Nicklas Lidstrom, respectively.

At 15:20 into the first period, a goal scored by Lidstrom was waved off after Tomas Holmstrom was called for goaltender interference. The remainder of the first period went scoreless, as Pittsburgh failed to capitalize on four consecutive power plays. At 13:01 into the second period, Mikael Samuelsson gave the Red Wings the unassisted game-winning goal, on a wrap-around. Just over two minutes into the third period, Samuelsson added his second unassisted goal of the game. At 17:18 into the third period, Dan Cleary scored shorthanded to give the Red Wings a 3–0 lead. Henrik Zetterberg scored on the power-play with 13 seconds remaining. Chris Osgood recorded his second shutout of the playoffs, to give the Red Wings a 4–0 victory in game one. The Red Wings outshot the Penguins 36–19.

Scoring summary
Period	Team	Goal	Assist(s)	Time	Score
1st	None				
2nd	DET	Mikael Samuelsson (3)	Unassisted	13:01	1–0 DET
3rd	DET	Mikael Samuelsson (4)	Unassisted	02:16	2–0 DET
3rd	DET	Daniel Cleary (2) – sh	Brad Stuart (3)	17:18	3–0 DET
3rd	DET	Henrik Zetterberg (12) – pp	Tomas Holmstrom (8), Nicklas Lidstrom (9)	19:47	4–0 DET
Penalty summary
Period	Team	Player	Penalty	Time	PIM
1st	PIT	Kris Letang	Interference	03:51	2:00
1st	DET	Tomas Holmstrom	High-sticking	04:02	2:00
1st	DET	Nicklas Lidstrom	Hooking	10:15	2:00
1st	DET	Darren Helm	Tripping	12:38	2:00
1st	DET	Tomas Holmstrom	Goaltender interference	15:20	2:00
1st	PIT	Hal Gill	High-sticking	19:00	2:00
2nd	PIT	Sidney Crosby	Slashing	01:55	2:00
2nd	PIT	Ryan Whitney	Holding	15:20	2:00
2nd	PIT	Evgeni Malkin	Tripping	19:28	2:00
3rd	DET	Nicklas Lidstrom	Interference	15:27	2:00
3rd	PIT	Jarkko Ruutu	Slashing	18:08	2:00

Shots by period
Team	1	2	3	Total
PIT	12	4	3	19
DET	11	16	9	36

=== Game two ===
May 26	Pittsburgh Penguins	0–3	Detroit Red Wings	Joe Louis Arena	Recap

In preparation for game two, head coach Michel Therrien revised Pittsburgh's lines; the revision included Gary Roberts who did not play in game one. Johan Franzen, the leading goal-scorer in the playoffs, returned to the line-up for Detroit.

Detroit's Brad Stuart scored the first goal of the game 6:55 into the first period, on a slap shot, with an assist from Valtteri Filppula. Tomas Holmstrom added a goal at 11:18 into the first period, to put Detroit up 2–0. Pittsburgh struggled throughout the period, failing to get a shot on goal for the game's first twelve minutes. Detroit outshot the Penguins 11–6 in the second period, but both teams failed to score. At 8:48 into the third period, Valtteri Filppula scored his first goal of the series, beating goaltender Marc-Andre Fleury with a wrist-shot. Chris Osgood recorded his second consecutive shutout, stopping all 22 shots faced.

Scoring summary
Period	Team	Goal	Assist(s)	Time	Score
1st	DET	Brad Stuart (1)	Valtteri Filppula (5)	06:55	1–0 DET
1st	DET	Tomas Holmstrom (4)	Henrik Zetterberg (11)	11:18	2–0 DET
2nd	None				
3rd	DET	Valtteri Filppula (4)	Johan Franzen (4), Brad Stuart (4)	08:48	3–0 DET
Penalty summary
Period	Team	Player	Penalty	Time	PIM
1st	DET	Brad Stuart	Tripping	11:33	2:00
1st	PIT	Ryan Malone	Interference	15:14	2:00
1st	DET	Daniel Cleary	Hooking	17:49	2:00
1st	PIT	Gary Roberts	Roughing	19:46	2:00
2nd	DET	Tomas Holmstrom	Slashing	11:17	2:00
2nd	PIT	Brooks Orpik	Roughing	11:17	2:00
2nd	PIT	Ryan Malone	Slashing	17:30	2:00
3rd	PIT	Marian Hossa	Holding	00:22	2:00
3rd	DET	Pavel Datsyuk	Roughing	03:42	2:00
3rd	PIT	Ryan Malone	Roughing	03:42	2:00
3rd	DET	Dallas Drake	Tripping	07:49	2:00
3rd	PIT	Ryan Malone	Goaltender interference	08:04	2:00
3rd	DET	Johan Franzen	Roughing	11:51	2:00
3rd	PIT	Maxime Talbot	Roughing – double minor	11:51	4:00
3rd	PIT	Ryan Whitney	Roughing	16:08	2:00
3rd	DET	Andreas Lilja	Roughing	18:52	2:00
3rd	DET	Johan Franzen	Roughing	18:52	2:00
3rd	PIT	Gary Roberts	Roughing	18:52	2:00
3rd	PIT	Gary Roberts	Misconduct	18:52	10:00
3rd	PIT	Petr Sykora	Goaltender interference	18:52	2:00
3rd	PIT	Evgeni Malkin	Roughing	18:52	2:00
3rd	PIT	Maxime Talbot	Misconduct	20:00	10:00

Shots by period
Team	1	2	3	Total
PIT	6	6	10	22
DET	12	11	11	34

=== Game three ===
May 28	Detroit Red Wings	2–3	Pittsburgh Penguins	Mellon Arena	Recap

Game three was held in Pittsburgh, where going into the matchup the Penguins had won sixteen consecutive home games. Pittsburgh continued to shuffle their lineup by replacing defenceman Kris Letang with veteran Darryl Sydor, but going back to the top line combinations from game one. Penguins captain Sidney Crosby scored the team's first goal of the series late in the first period, with an assist from Marian Hossa. The Penguins went up 2-0 after Crosby scored a second time, his second coming on the power-play, just 2:34 into the second period. Johan Franzen pulled the Red Wings within one, when he scored on the power-play at 14:48 of the second period. Adam Hall scored his second goal of the post season, when the Penguins winger scored at 7:18 of the third period, putting his team up 3–1. Mikael Samuelsson scored a second goal for the Red Wings, with assists from Brad Stuart and Valtteri Filppula. However, Pittsburgh's 3–2 lead held, giving the team their first victory of the series. Despite winning the game, Pittsburgh was outshot by the Red Wings for the third consecutive game by at least 10 shots.

Scoring summary
Period	Team	Goal	Assist(s)	Time	Score
1st	PIT	Sidney Crosby (5)	Marian Hossa (11)	17:25	1–0 PIT
2nd	PIT	Sidney Crosby (6) – pp	Marian Hossa (12), Ryan Malone (10)	02:34	2 0 PIT
2nd	DET	Johan Franzen (13) – pp	Nicklas Lidstrom (10), Niklas Kronwall (13)	14:48	2–1 PIT
3rd	PIT	Adam Hall (2)	Maxime Talbot (6), Gary Roberts (2)	07:18	3–1 PIT
3rd	DET	Mikael Samuelsson (5)	Brad Stuart (5), Valtteri Filppula (6)	13:37	3–2 PIT
Penalty summary
Period	Team	Player	Penalty	Time	PIM
1st	DET	Johan Franzen	Holding	01:04	2:00
1st	PIT	Jordan Staal	Holding	03:05	2:00
1st	PIT	Sergei Gonchar	Hooking	12:07	2:00
1st	DET	Brian Rafalski	Tripping	19:19	2:00
2nd	DET	Niklas Kronwall	Hooking	02:02	2:00
2nd	PIT	Hal Gill	Cross-checking	08:54	2:00
2nd	PIT	Hall Gill	Cross-checking	12:57	2:00
3rd	PIT	Evgeni Malkin	Hooking	15:42	2:00

Shots by period
Team	1	2	3	Total
PIT	6	13	5	24
DET	9	9	16	34

=== Game four ===
May 31	Detroit Red Wings	2–1	Pittsburgh Penguins	Mellon Arena	Recap

Entering Game 4, Petr Sykora said the game was a must-win for the Penguins, "For us, basically, [game four] is a do-or-die game". Jiri Hudler's game-winning goal at 2:26 of the third period broke a 1–1 tie, and the Red Wings killed off a Penguins 1:26 5-on-3 advantage midway through the final period to help preserve the victory, thanks in large part to a terrific defensive play by Henrik Zetterberg on Sidney Crosby, preventing what would have been a tap-in goal when he tied up Crosby's stick at the front of the net. Pittsburgh scored first on Marian Hossa's power play goal 2:51 into the game before Nicklas Lidstrom tied the game at 7:06 of the first period.

Scoring summary
Period	Team	Goal	Assist(s)	Time	Score
1st	PIT	Marian Hossa (10) – pp	Sergei Gonchar (11), Sidney Crosby (18)	02:51	1–0 PIT
1st	DET	Nicklas Lidstrom	Brian Rafalski (9), Pavel Datsyuk (11)	07:06	1–1
2nd	None				
3rd	DET	Jiri Hudler (5)	Darren Helm (2), Brad Stuart (6)	02:26	2–1 DET
Penalty summary
Period	Team	Player	Penalty	Time	PIM
1st	DET	Dallas Drake	Roughing	02:11	2:00
1st	PIT	Pascal Dupuis	Cross-checking	05:04	2:00
1st	DET	Brian Rafalski	Roughing	09:03	2:00
1st	DET	Kris Draper	Holding	14:28	2:00
1st	DET	Brett Lebda	Cross-checking	16:59	2:00
1st	PIT	Maxime Talbot	Embellishment	16:59	2:00
1st	DET	Johan Franzen	Elbowing	17:55	2:00
1st	PIT	Brooks Orpik	Roughing	17:55	2:00
2nd	PIT	Jordan Staal	Interference	03:44	2:00
2nd	DET	Brian Rafalski	Holding	16:04	2:00
3rd	PIT	Marc-Andre Fleury	Delay of game	04:08	2:00
3rd	DET	Kirk Maltby	Hooking	09:36	2:00
3rd	DET	Andreas Lilja	Interference	10:10	2:00

Shots by period
Team	1	2	3	Total
PIT	9	8	6	23
DET	14	7	9	30

=== Game five ===
June 2	Pittsburgh Penguins	4–3	3OT	Detroit Red Wings	Joe Louis Arena	Recap

Pittsburgh's Marian Hossa scored the first goal of the game at 8:37 into the first period. Teammate Adam Hall added his second goal of the series at 14:41 of the first period, giving the Penguins a 2–0 lead. Detroit then scored three consecutive goals—by Darren Helm, Pavel Datsyuk, and Brian Rafalski—to gain the lead. After Pittsburgh pulled its goalie with less than one minute remaining in regulation, Maxime Talbot scored with 34.3 seconds remaining to tie the game and force overtime. The goal marked only the second time in NHL history that a team avoided elimination in the Finals by scoring in the last minute of the third period. The first two overtime periods were scoreless, and the game went into the third overtime with Detroit killing two consecutive penalties, and Pittsburgh killing one. At the 9:21 mark, Pittsburgh's Petr Sykora scored the game-winning goal on another power-play, forcing the series back to Pittsburgh for game six. The goal was assisted by defenceman Sergei Gonchar, who was playing his first shift in forty minutes as a result of an injury, and Evgeni Malkin, who got his first point of the Finals. Pittsburgh became the first team in modern NHL history to have three overtime power-plays in the Finals. Goaltenders Marc-Andre Fleury and Chris Osgood stopped 55 and 28 shots, respectively. The triple overtime game was the fifth-longest in Stanley Cup Final history.

Scoring summary
Period	Team	Goal	Assist(s)	Time	Score
1st	PIT	Marian Hossa (11)	Sidney Crosby (19), Pascal Dupuis (5)	08:37	1–0 PIT
1st	PIT	Adam Hall (3)	Unassisted	14:41	2–0 PIT
2nd	DET	Darren Helm (2)	Kirk Maltby (1)	02:54	2–1 PIT
3rd	DET	Pavel Datsyuk (10) – pp	Henrik Zetterberg (12), Brian Rafalski (10)	06:43	2–2
3rd	DET	Brian Rafalski (3)	Johan Franzen (5), Henrik Zetterberg (13)	09:23	3–2 DET
3rd	PIT	Maxime Talbot (3)	Marian Hossa (13), Sidney Crosby (20)	19:25	3–3
OT	None				
2OT	None				
3OT	PIT	Petr Sykora (6) – pp	Evgeni Malkin (11), Sergei Gonchar (12)	09:57	4–3 PIT
Penalty summary
Period	Team	Player	Penalty	Time	PIM
1st	PIT	Brooks Orpik	Hooking	02:06	2:00
1st	PIT	Bench (served by Tyler Kennedy)	Too many men on the ice	04:16	2:00
1st	DET	Pavel Datsyuk	Tripping	05:24	2:00
1st	DET	Kirk Maltby	Roughing	10:50	2:00
1st	PIT	Maxime Talbot	Roughing	10:50	2:00
2nd	DET	Kirk Maltby	Interference	05:48	2:00
2nd	PIT	Sidney Crosby	High-sticking	10:18	2:00
3rd	PIT	Tyler Kennedy	Hooking	06:21	2:00
OT	DET	Henrik Zetterberg	Goaltender interference	17:25	2:00
2OT	DET	Daniel Cleary	Goaltender interference	03:41	2:00
2OT	PIT	Petr Sykora	Hooking	17:44	2:00
3OT	DET	Jiri Hudler	High-sticking – double minor	09:21	4:00

Shots by period
Team	1	2	3	OT	2OT	3OT	Total
PIT	7	7	4	2	8	4	32
DET	8	12	14	13	7	4	58

=== Game six ===
June 4	Detroit Red Wings	3–2	Pittsburgh Penguins	Mellon Arena	Recap

Pittsburgh's Ryan Malone was scheduled to have X-rays on June 3, after being hit in the face with the puck in game five, but was expected to play.

The Red Wings took a 2–0 lead in the second period in game six en route to a 3–2 victory to clinch the Stanley Cup. Brian Rafalski scored a power play goal at 5:03 in the first period before Valtteri Filppula extended the lead with a goal at 8:07 in the second. The Penguins had an opportunity to get their first goal later in the first period, with a 5-on-3 advantage for 1:33, but could not convert. Pittsburgh finally cut the lead at 15:26 of the second period with Evgeni Malkin's power play goal. However, a third period shot by Detroit's Henrik Zetterberg squeezed through the legs of Pittsburgh goaltender Marc-Andre Fleury, who, after noticing he was not covering the puck, fell backwards and accidentally knocked the puck across the goal line for the Red Wings' third goal. Marian Hossa scored a power play goal (in addition to the Penguins pulling Fleury for an extra attacker and the Red Wings' Andreas Lilja having lost his stick as a result of Malone knocking it out of his hands) at 18:33 of the third period to cut the lead to 3–2, but the Penguins, despite a shot by Sidney Crosby and shot off rebound by Hossa in the final seconds, could not tie the game before time ran out. Lidstrom became the first European-born Stanley Cup captain.

The Wings' victory also saw the Triple Gold Club, made up of individuals who have won the Stanley Cup plus gold medals at the Olympics and World Championships, gain three new members. Niklas Kronwall, Mikael Samuelsson, and Zetterberg had previously won the other two components with the Sweden national team in 2006 at that year's Olympics and World Championships. Lidstrom, already a member of the club, got a fourth Stanley Cup in his resumé.

Scoring summary
Period	Team	Goal	Assist(s)	Time	Score
1st	DET	Brian Rafalski (4) – pp	Henrik Zetterberg (14), Pavel Datsyuk (12)	05:03	1–0 DET
2nd	DET	Valtteri Filppula (5)	Mikael Samuelsson (8), Niklas Kronwall (14)	08:07	2–0 DET
2nd	PIT	Evgeni Malkin (10) – pp	Sidney Crosby (21), Marian Hossa (14)	15:26	2–1 DET
3rd	DET	Henrik Zetterberg (13)	Pavel Datsyuk (13), Niklas Kronwall (15)	07:36	3–1 DET
3rd	PIT	Marian Hossa (12) – pp	Sergei Gonchar (13), Evgeni Malkin (12)	18:33	3–2 DET
Penalty summary
Period	Team	Player	Penalty	Time	PIM
1st	PIT	Darryl Sydor	Interference	04:17	2:00
1st	DET	Dallas Drake	Charging	08:28	2:00
1st	DET	Kris Draper	Roughing	08:55	2:00
1st	PIT	Adam Hall	High-sticking	11:15	2:00
2nd	DET	Andreas Lilja	Slashing	02:06	2:00
2nd	DET	Pavel Datsyuk	Interference	14:22	2:00
2nd	PIT	Gary Roberts	High-sticking	16:13	2:00
2nd	DET	Johan Franzen	Roughing	17:58	2:00
2nd	PIT	Brooks Orpik	Roughing	17:58	2:00
3rd	DET	Jiri Hudler	Hooking	18:13	2:00

Shots by period
Team	1	2	3	Total
DET	9	9	12	30
PIT	8	8	6	22

== Television ==
In the United States, Versus aired games one and two while NBC televised the remainder of the series. Game one of the 2008 Stanley Cup Final had a 1.8 rating, drawing 2.3 million viewers. The rating was a 157% increase over the previous Playoff Finals opener, and a 100% rise from two years previous. Game two had a 1.9 rating, drawing 2.5 million viewers. It was the highest-rated and most-watched cable telecast of the Finals in six years in the United States. The rating was the highest for an NHL game on Versus and the second highest rating for a Versus broadcast ever only to Lance Armstrong's seventh straight Tour de France victory in 2005 (2.1). Game three drew a 2.8 rating, representing an 87% increase over the previous year's game three. In Detroit, game three drew higher ratings (18.2) than game five of the 2008 NBA Eastern Conference Finals between the Detroit Pistons and the Boston Celtics (15.9). Game four earned a 2.3 rating, up 21% over the previous year's game four. Game five drew a 4.3 rating, representing a 79% increase from the previous year's game five. It drew the highest ratings for a game five since 2002. Game six had a 4.4 rating, the best performance in a game six since 2000. It was a 100% increase over game six of 2006 and was the highest rated game for NBC since they reacquired the NHL broadcasting rights in 2004.

On the CBC in Canada, this was the last Stanley Cup Final that Bob Cole served as the play-by-play announcer for, as Jim Hughson took over the following year. Game 6 was also the final game broadcast on CBC using the iconic “The Hockey Theme” song after 40 years.

== Team rosters ==
Years indicated in boldface under the "Finals appearance" column signify that the player won the Stanley Cup in the given year.

=== Pittsburgh Penguins ===
Goaltenders
#	Player	Catches	Acquired	Place of birth		Finals appearance
**29**	Marc-Andre Fleury	L	2003	(Canada)	Sorel-Tracy, Quebec	first
**35**	Ty Conklin	L	2007	(United States)	Phoenix, Arizona	second (2006)

Defencemen
#	Player	Shoots	Acquired	Place of birth		Finals appearance
2	Hal Gill	L	2008	(United States)	Concord, Massachusetts	first
4	Rob Scuderi	L	1998	(United States)	Syosset, New York	first
5	Darryl Sydor	L	2007	(Canada)	Edmonton, Alberta	fifth (1993, **1999**, 2000, **2004**)
19	Ryan Whitney	L	2002	(United States)	Scituate, Massachusetts	first
44	Brooks Orpik	L	2001	(United States)	San Francisco, California	first
55	Sergei Gonchar – **A**	L	2005	(Russia)	Chelyabinsk, Soviet Union	second (1998)
58	Kris Letang	R	2005	(Canada)	Montreal, Quebec	first

Forwards
#	Player	Position	Shoots	Acquired	Place of birth		Finals appearance
9	Pascal Dupuis	LW/RW	L	2008	(Canada)	Laval, Quebec	first
10	Gary Roberts – **A**	LW	L	2007	(Canada)	North York, Ontario	second (**1989**)
11	Jordan Staal	C	L	2006	(Canada)	Thunder Bay, Ontario	first
12	Ryan Malone	LW	L	1999	(United States)	Pittsburgh, Pennsylvania	first
17	Petr Sykora	RW	L	2007	(Czech Republic)	Plzeň, Czechoslovakia	fourth (**2000**, 2001, 2003)
18	Marian Hossa	RW	L	2008	(Slovakia)	Stará Ľubovňa, Czechoslovakia	first
25	Maxime Talbot	C/LW	L	2002	(Canada)	LeMoyne, Quebec	first
27	Georges Laraque	RW	R	2007	(Canada)	Montreal, Quebec	second (2006)
28	Adam Hall	RW/C	R	2007	(United States)	Kalamazoo, Michigan	first
37	Jarkko Ruutu	LW	L	2006	(Finland)	Helsinki, Finland	first
38	Jeff Taffe	C/LW	L	2007	(United States)	Hastings, Minnesota	first (did not play)
48	Tyler Kennedy	C/RW	R	2004	(Canada)	Sault Ste. Marie, Ontario	first
71	Evgeni Malkin	C	L	2004	(Russia)	Magnitogorsk, Soviet Union	first
87	Sidney Crosby – **C**	C	L	2005	(Canada)	Cole Harbour, Nova Scotia	first

=== Detroit Red Wings ===
Goaltenders
#	Player	Catches	Acquired	Place of birth		Finals appearance
**30**	Chris Osgood	L	2005	(Canada)	Peace River, Alberta	fourth (1995, **1997**, **1998**)
**39**	Dominik Hasek	L	2006	(Czech Republic)	Pardubice, Czechoslovakia	fourth (did not play; 1992, 1999, **2002**)

Defencemen
#	Player	Shoots	Acquired	Place of birth		Finals appearance
3	Andreas Lilja	L	2005	(Sweden)	Helsingborg, Sweden	first
5	Nicklas Lidstrom – **C**	L	1989	(Sweden)	Krylbo, Sweden	fifth (1995, **1997**, **1998**, **2002**)
14	Derek Meech	L	2002	(Canada)	Winnipeg, Manitoba	first (did not play)
22	Brett Lebda	L	2004	(United States)	Buffalo Grove, Illinois	first
23	Brad Stuart	L	2008	(Canada)	Rocky Mountain House, Alberta	first
24	Chris Chelios	R	1999	(United States)	Chicago, Illinois	fifth (did not play; **1986**, 1989, 1992, **2002**)
28	Brian Rafalski	R	2007	(United States)	Dearborn, Michigan	fourth (**2000**, 2001, **2003**)
55	Niklas Kronwall	L	2000	(Sweden)	Stockholm, Sweden	first

Forwards
#	Player	Position	Shoots	Acquired	Place of birth		Finals appearance
11	Daniel Cleary	LW/RW	L	2005	(Canada)	Carbonear, Newfoundland	first
13	Pavel Datsyuk – **A**	C/LW	L	1998	(Russia)	Sverdlovsk, Soviet Union	second (**2002**)
17	Dallas Drake	RW/LW	L	2007	(Canada)	Trail, British Columbia	first
18	Kirk Maltby	RW/LW	R	1996	(Canada)	Guelph, Ontario	fourth (**1997**, **1998**, **2002**)
20	Aaron Downey	RW	R	2007	(Canada)	Shelburne, Ontario	first (did not play)
25	Darren McCarty	RW	R	2008	(Canada)	Burnaby, British Columbia	fifth (1995, **1997**, **1998**, **2002**)
26	Jiri Hudler	RW/LW/C	L	2002	(Czech Republic)	Olomouc, Czechoslovakia	first
33	Kris Draper – **A**	C	L	1993	(Canada)	Toronto, Ontario	fifth (1995, **1997**, **1998**, **2002**)
37	Mikael Samuelsson	RW	R	2005	(Sweden)	Mariefred, Sweden	first
40	Henrik Zetterberg – **A**	C/RW	L	1999	(Sweden)	Njurunda, Sweden	first
43	Darren Helm	LW/C	L	2005	(Canada)	St. Andrews, Manitoba	first
51	Valtteri Filppula	C	L	2002	(Finland)	Vantaa, Finland	first
82	Tomas Kopecky	LW	L	2000	(Slovakia)	Dubnica nad Váhom, Czechoslovakia	first (did not play)
93	Johan Franzen	LW	L	2004	(Sweden)	Vetlanda, Sweden	first
96	Tomas Holmstrom	RW	L	1994	(Sweden)	Piteå, Sweden	fourth (**1997**, **1998**, **2002**)

== Stanley Cup engraving ==
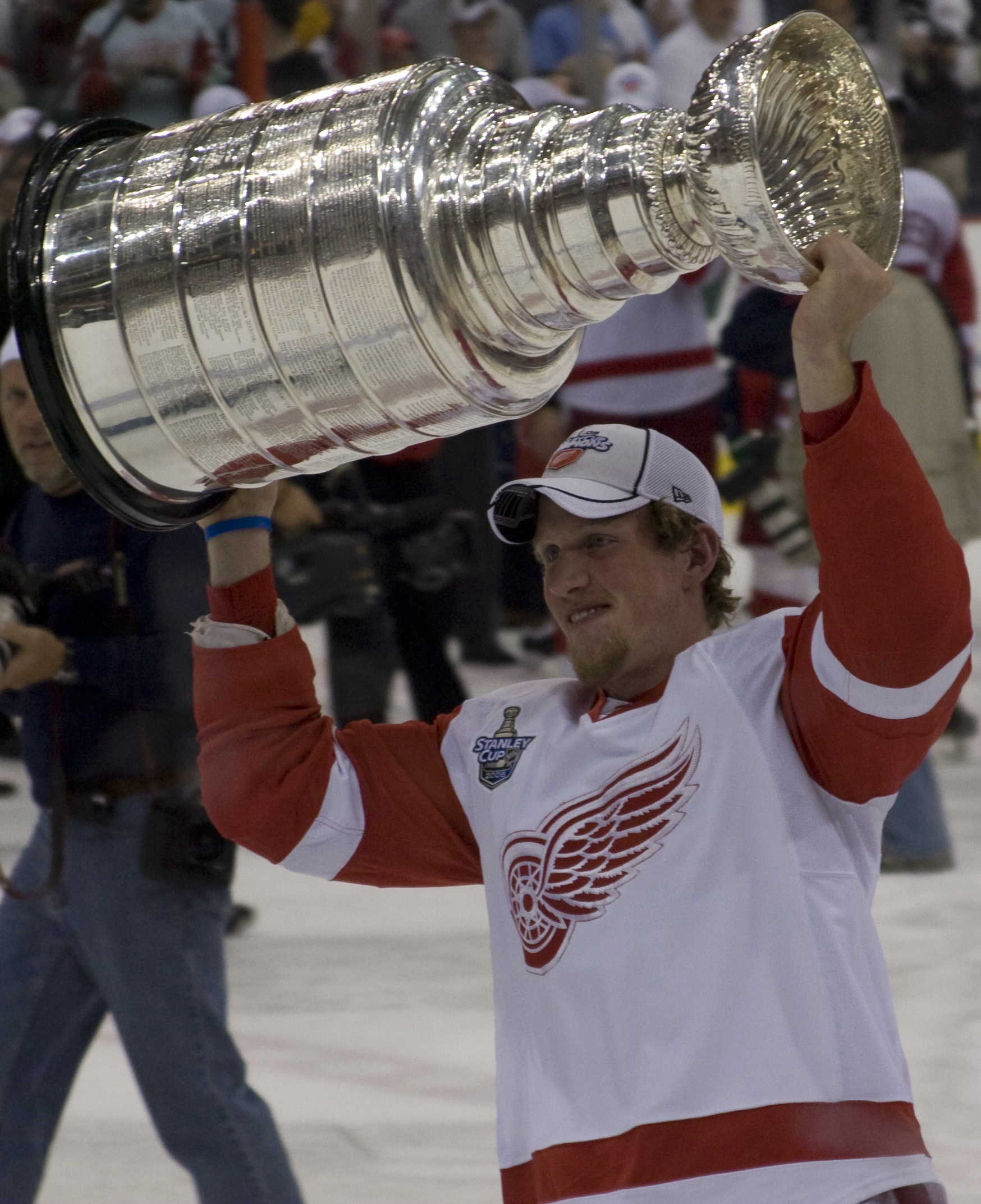
Justin Abdelkader hoists the Stanley Cup after Game six

The 2008 Stanley Cup was presented to Red Wings captain Nicklas Lidstrom by NHL Commissioner Gary Bettman following the Red Wings 4–2 win over the Penguins in game six.

The following Red Wings players and staff had their names engraved on the Stanley Cup

2007–08 Detroit Red Wings

=== Players ===
Centres

- 13 Pavel Datsyuk* (A)
- 26 Jiri Hudler*
- 33 Kris Draper (A)
- 40 Henrik Zetterberg* (A)
- 43 Darren Helm
- 51 Valtteri Filppula

Wingers

- 11 Daniel Cleary
- 17 Dallas Drake
- 18 Kirk Maltby
- 20 Aaron Downey
- 25 Darren McCarty
- 37 Mikael Samuelsson
- 82 Tomas Kopecky †
- 93 Johan Franzen
- 96 Tomas Holmstrom

Defencemen

- 3 Andreas Lilja
- 5 Nicklas Lidstrom (Captain)
- 14 Derek Meech ‡
- 22 Brett Lebda
- 23 Brad Stuart
- 24 Chris Chelios †
- 28 Brian Rafalski
- 55 Niklas Kronwall

Goaltenders

- 30 Chris Osgood
- 39 Dominik Hasek
- * Played both centre and wing.
- † Did not play in the Final.
- ‡ Exemption granted to engrave the name of a player who did not automatically qualify. (Note: Automatic qualification for a player's name to be engraved on the Stanley Cup: Playing in (for a goaltender, dressing for) at least one Stanley Cup Final game or at least half of regular season games for the Stanley Cup winning team.)

=== Coaching and administrative staff ===
- Mike Ilitch Sr. (Owner/President/Governor), Marian Ilitch (Owner/Secretary-Treasurer), Christopher Ilitch (Vice President Red Wings/President-Chief Executive Officer Ilitch Holdings/Alt. Governor)
- Denise Ilitch, Ronald Ilitch, Michael Ilitch Jr. (Minority Owners)
- Lisa Ilitch Murray, Atanas Ilitch, Carole Ilitch (Minority Owners), Jim Devellano (Sr. Vice President/Alt. Governor)
- Ken Holland (Executive Vice President/General Manager/Alt. Governor), Steve Yzerman (Vice President/Alt. Governor), Jim Nill (Vice President/Asst. General Manager), Ryan Martin (Director-Hockey Administration)
- Scotty Bowman (Consultant), Mike Babcock (Head Coach), Todd McLellan (Associate Coach), Paul MacLean (Asst. Coach)
- Jim Bedard (Goaltending Coach), Jay Woodcroft (Video Coach), Mark Howe (Director of Pro Scouting), Joe McDonnell (Director of Amateur Scouting)
- Hakan Andersson (Director of European Scouting), Piet Van Zant (Athletic Therapist), Paul Boyer (Equipment Manager)
- Russ Baumann (Ass't Athletic Therapist), Christopher Scoppetto (Assistant Equipment Manager)

=== Engraving notes ===
- #14 Derek Meech (D) played in 32 regular season games, but was a healthy scratch for the entire playoffs. Meech spent the entire season with Detroit. As he did not automatically qualify, Detroit successfully requested an exemption to engrave his name.
- Chris Chelios became the oldest player to win the Stanley Cup at age 46 (See 1928 Lester Patrick for oldest player who played in the Stanley Cup Final).
- Five players won 4 Stanley Cup with Detroit in 1997, 1998, 2002, and 2008 – Kris Draper, Tomas Holmstrom, Nicklas Lidstrom, Kirk Maltby, and Darren McCarty. Chris Osgood only missed the 2002 title.
- Steve Yzerman also won 4 Stanley Cup with Detroit 1997-98-2002 (Captain), 2008 (Vice President).
- 19 non-players won 4 Stanley Cups with Detroit - Mike Ilitch Sr., Marian Ilitch, Christopher Ilitch, Denise Ilitch, Ronald Ilitch, Michael Ilitch Jr, Lisa Ilitch Murray, Atanas Ilitch, Carole Ilitch, Jim Devellano, Ken Holland, Scotty Bowman, Jim Nill, Mark Howe, Hakan Anderson, Paul Boyer, Joe McDonnell, Mark Leach (left off cup 2008), Paul McDonald (Left off cup 1997-98-2008).
- A record number of 12 European born players won the Stanley Cup – Dominik Hasek and Jiri Hudler of the Czech Republic; Tomas Kopecky of Slovakia; Valtteri Filppula of Finland; Pavel Datsyuk of Russia; and Johan Franzen, Tomas Holmstrom, Niklas Kronwall, Andreas Lilja, Nicklas Lidstrom, Mikael Samuelsson and Henrik Zetterberg of Sweden.
- Sergie Tchekmarev (Team Masseur), Lynn Newman (Massage Therapist) – Rick Szuber (Equipment Assistant). All 10 members were left off the Stanley Cup, but received Stanley Cup rings.

=== Player notes ===
- Seven players on the roster during the Final were left off the Stanley Cup engraving due to not qualifying. Only Mark Hartigan played in (and dressed for) the playoffs.
  - #44 Mark Hartigan (C) – 23 regular season games and 4 playoff games. He was left off for the second year in row for not playing in the last two rounds of the playoffs.
  - #52 Jonathan Ericsson (D) – 8 regular season games
  - #4 Kyle Quincey (D) – 6 regular season games
  - #35 Jimmy Howard (G) – 4 regular games
  - #8 Justin Abdelkader (LW) – 2 regular season games
  - #42 Mattias Ritola (LW) – 2 regular season games
  - #46 Jakub Kindl (D) – 0 regular season games, 76 in minors

== See also ==
- 2007–08 Detroit Red Wings season
- 2007–08 Pittsburgh Penguins season

== Notes ==
Preceded by Anaheim Ducks; 2007	Detroit Red Wings; Stanley Cup champions 2008	Succeeded by Pittsburgh Penguins; 2009
