= Brad Stuart =

Canadian ice hockey player (born 1979)

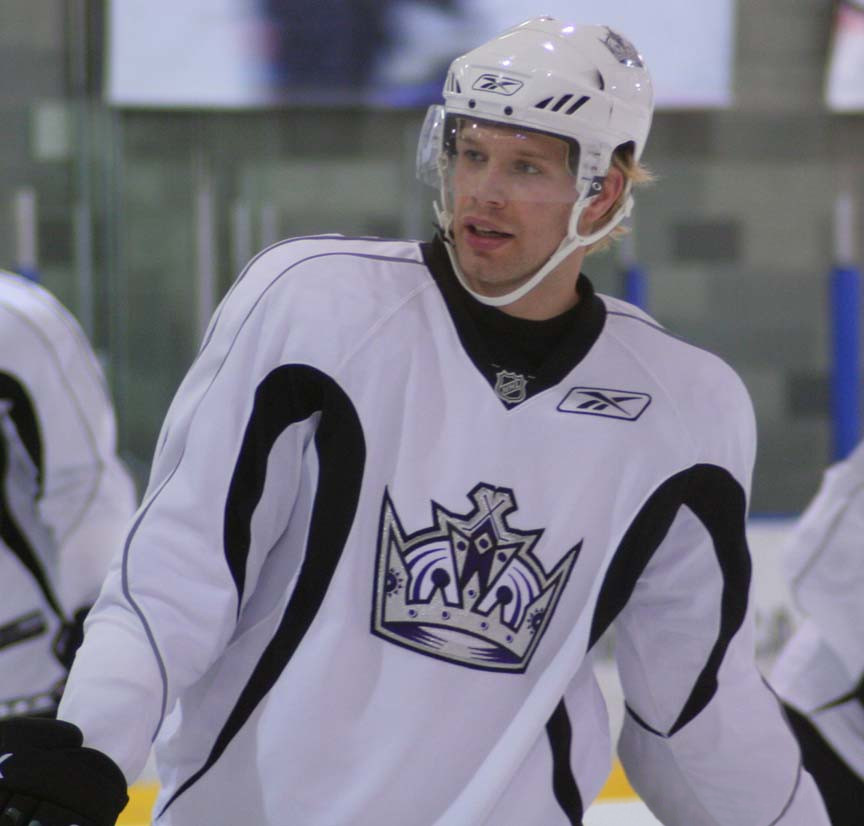
- Stuart with the Los Angeles Kings in 2007
- Born: November 6, 1979 (age 47) Rocky Mountain House, Alberta, Canada
- Height: 6 ft 2 in (188 cm)
- Weight: 215 lb (98 kg; 15 st 5 lb)
- Position: Defence
- Shot: Left
- Played for: San Jose Sharks; Boston Bruins; Calgary Flames; Los Angeles Kings; Detroit Red Wings; Colorado Avalanche
- National team: Canada
- NHL draft: 3rd overall, 1998; San Jose Sharks
- Playing career: 1999–2016

Bradley Stuart (born November 6, 1979) is a Canadian former professional ice hockey defenceman who played in over 1,000 career games in the National Hockey League (NHL) with the San Jose Sharks, Boston Bruins, Calgary Flames, Los Angeles Kings, Detroit Red Wings, and Colorado Avalanche.

Stuart was a member of the Stanley Cup-winning 2007–08 Detroit Red Wings, his first and only Stanley Cup win.

== Playing career ==
=== San Jose Sharks ===
Stuart was drafted in the first round, third overall, in the 1998 NHL entry draft by the San Jose Sharks. In a game against the Los Angeles Kings on April 4, 2004, Stuart scored twice in a 17-second span, forcing the game into overtime at a 3–3 tie; Stuart's feat is the fastest that a Sharks player has scored two goals. The Sharks went on to win 4–3.

In November 2005, after playing with the Sharks for more than five seasons, Stuart was traded (along with Marco Sturm and Wayne Primeau) to the Boston Bruins in exchange for Joe Thornton.

=== Calgary Flames ===
On February 10, 2007, Stuart was traded to the Calgary Flames (again alongside Wayne Primeau) in exchange for Andrew Ference and Chuck Kobasew. Boston general manager Peter Chiarelli cited his inability to agree on a new contract with Stuart, who was scheduled to become an unrestricted free agent at the end of the 2006–07 season, as a reason for the trade.

=== Los Angeles Kings ===
After the end of the season, Stuart signed a one-year, $3.5 million contract with the Los Angeles Kings.

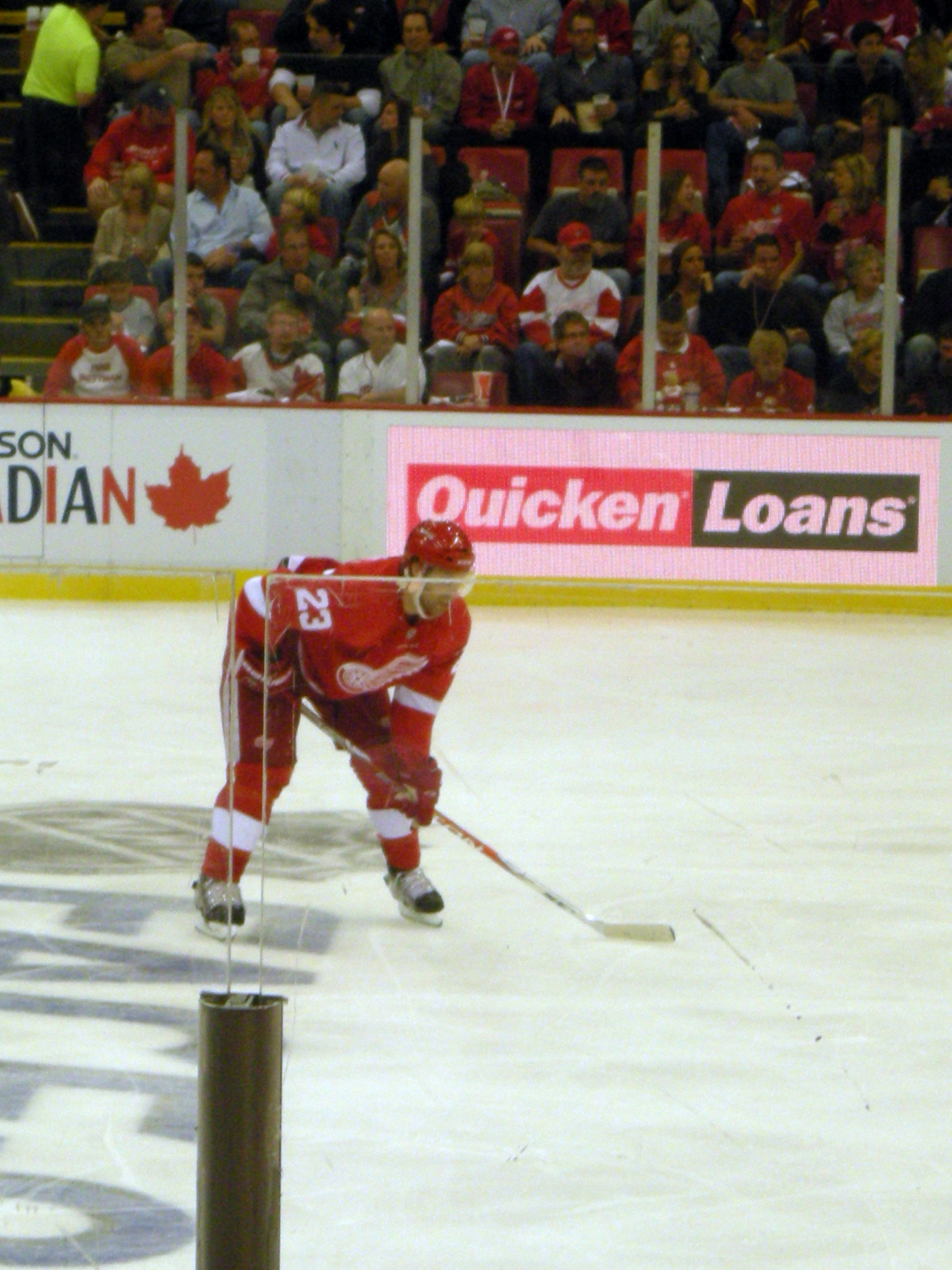
Stuart with the Red Wings in October 2010.

=== Detroit Red Wings ===
On February 26, 2008, the Kings traded Stuart to the Detroit Red Wings in exchange for second- and fourth-round picks in the 2008 and 2009 NHL entry drafts, respectively. On June 4, 2008, Stuart won the Stanley Cup as a member of the Red Wings, where he saw time as a top-four defenceman paired with Niklas Kronwall. On July 1, 2008, as an unrestricted free agent, Stuart re-signed with the Red Wings on a four-year, $15 million contract. Stuart returned to his hometown of Rocky Mountain House on August 17, 2008, with the Stanley Cup to share his celebration with those that supported him.

Stuart played in 67 games during the 2008–09 season, recording 2 goals and 13 assists as the Red Wings came within one game of repeating as Stanley Cup champions, losing in the 2009 Stanley Cup Final to the Pittsburgh Penguins.

He would record 61 points in the next three seasons with the Red Wings.

=== Return to San Jose ===
On June 10, 2012, Stuart's negotiating rights were traded to the San Jose Sharks in exchange for the negotiating rights to forward Andrew Murray and a conditional seventh-round pick in the 2014 NHL entry draft. Eight days later, it was reported Stuart signed a three-year, $10.8 million deal with the Sharks. On October 8, 2013, in a game against the New York Rangers, Stuart landed a hit on Rick Nash which led to Stuart being suspended for three games. Stuart finished the season with 11 points in 61 games before surrendering a three-games-to-none series lead in the Conference Quarterfinals to the Los Angeles Kings.

=== Colorado Avalanche and retirement ===
On July 1, 2014, with the Sharks intent on getting younger, Stuart accepted a trade to provide a veteran presence to the Colorado Avalanche in exchange for second- and sixth-round picks in the 2016 and 2017 NHL entry drafts, respectively. On September 29, 2014, before playing a game with the Avalanche, Stuart signed a two-year contract extension with the organization. Stuart played in his 1,000th career game on December 18, 2014. Stuart finished the regular season with 3 goals and 10 assists for 13 points in 65 games as the Avalanche failed to qualify for the 2015 playoffs.

In the 2015–16 season, his second season with the Avalanche, Stuart appeared in only six games before he was ruled out with a back injury on November 10, 2015. With little sign of improvement, on February 1, 2016, it was announced Stuart's season was over after he underwent back surgery. During the subsequent off-season on June 27, 2016, with the Avalanche aiming to go younger on defence, Stuart was bought out from the remaining year of his contract, ending his tenure with Colorado.

== Career statistics ==
=== Regular season and playoffs ===
			Regular season					Playoffs
Season	Team	League	GP	G	A	Pts	PIM	GP	G	A	Pts	PIM
1995–96	Red Deer Chiefs AAA	AMHL	35	12	25	37	83	—	—	—	—	—
1995–96	Regina Pats	WHL	3	0	0	0	0	—	—	—	—	—
1996–97	Regina Pats	WHL	57	7	36	43	58	5	0	4	4	4
1997–98	Regina Pats	WHL	72	20	45	65	82	9	3	4	7	10
1998–99	Regina Pats	WHL	29	10	19	29	43	—	—	—	—	—
1998–99	Calgary Hitmen	WHL	30	11	22	33	26	21	8	15	23	59
1999–00	San Jose Sharks	NHL	82	10	26	36	32	12	1	0	1	6
2000–01	San Jose Sharks	NHL	77	5	18	23	56	5	1	0	1	0
2001–02	San Jose Sharks	NHL	82	6	23	29	39	12	0	3	3	8
2002–03	San Jose Sharks	NHL	36	4	10	14	46	—	—	—	—	—
2003–04	San Jose Sharks	NHL	77	9	30	39	34	17	1	5	6	13
2005–06	San Jose Sharks	NHL	23	2	10	12	14	—	—	—	—	—
2005–06	Boston Bruins	NHL	55	10	21	31	38	—	—	—	—	—
2006–07	Boston Bruins	NHL	48	7	10	17	26	—	—	—	—	—
2006–07	Calgary Flames	NHL	27	0	5	5	18	6	0	1	1	6
2007–08	Los Angeles Kings	NHL	63	5	16	21	67	—	—	—	—	—
2007–08	Detroit Red Wings	NHL	9	1	1	2	2	21	1	6	7	14
2008–09	Detroit Red Wings	NHL	67	2	13	15	26	23	3	6	9	12
2009–10	Detroit Red Wings	NHL	82	4	16	20	22	12	2	4	6	8
2010–11	Detroit Red Wings	NHL	67	3	17	20	40	11	0	2	2	8
2011–12	Detroit Red Wings	NHL	81	6	15	21	29	5	0	1	1	0
2012–13	San Jose Sharks	NHL	48	0	6	6	25	11	1	2	3	2
2013–14	San Jose Sharks	NHL	61	3	8	11	35	7	0	0	0	0
2014–15	Colorado Avalanche	NHL	65	3	10	13	16	—	—	—	—	—
2015–16	Colorado Avalanche	NHL	6	0	0	0	0	—	—	—	—	—
NHL totals			1,056	80	255	335	565	142	10	30	40	77

=== International ===
Year	Team	Event	Result	GP	G	A	Pts	PIM
1999	Canada	WJC	2nd place, silver medalist(s)	7	0	1	1	2
2001	Canada	WC	5th	7	1	1	2	6
2006	Canada	WC	7th	9	0	3	3	14
Junior totals				7	0	1	1	2
Senior totals				16	1	4	5	20

== Awards and honours ==
Award	Year
WHL
CHL/NHL Top Prospects Game	1998
East Second All-Star Team	1998
East First All-Star Team	1999
Bill Hunter Memorial Trophy	1999
Ed Chynoweth Cup	1999
CHL First All-Star Team	1999
CHL Defenseman of the Year	1999
NHL
NHL All-Rookie Team	2000
Stanley Cup (Detroit Red Wings)	2008

Awards and achievements
Preceded by Scott Hannan	San Jose Sharks first-round draft pick 1998	Succeeded by Jeff Jillson
