= Andreas Lilja =

Swedish ice hockey player (born 1975)

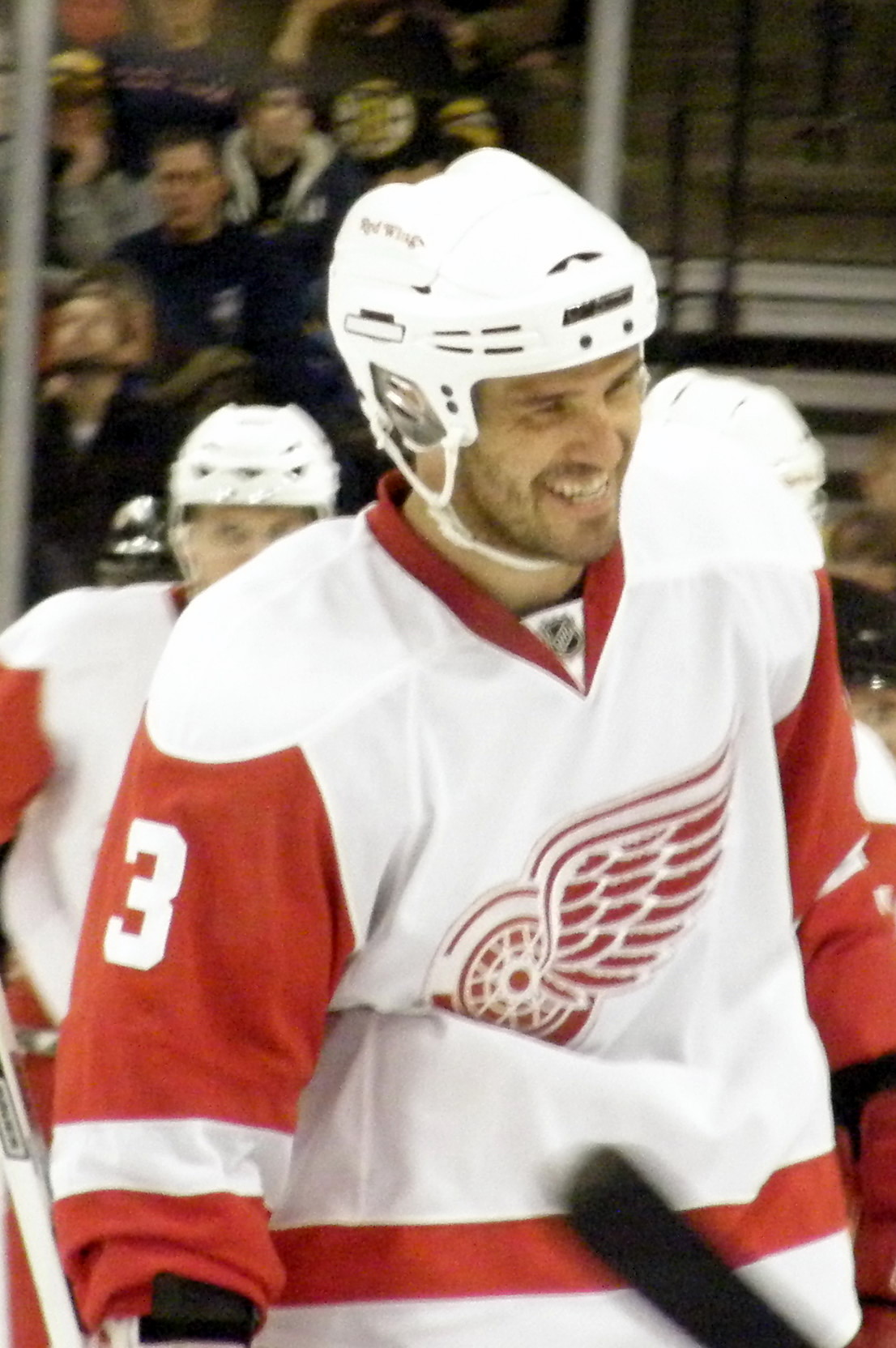
- Lilja with the Detroit Red Wings in 2008
- Born: July 13, 1975 (age 51) Helsingborg, Sweden
- Height: 6 ft 3 in (191 cm)
- Weight: 220 lb (100 kg; 15 st 10 lb)
- Position: Defence
- Shot: Left
- Played for: Malmö IF; Los Angeles Kings; Florida Panthers; Mora IK; HC Ambrì-Piotta; Detroit Red Wings; Anaheim Ducks; Philadelphia Flyers; Rögle BK
- NHL draft: 54th overall, 2000; Los Angeles Kings
- Playing career: 1995–2015

Andreas Johnny Lilja (born July 13, 1975) is a Swedish former professional ice hockey defenceman who played twelve seasons in the National Hockey League (NHL) for the Los Angeles Kings, Florida Panthers, Detroit Red Wings, Anaheim Ducks, and Philadelphia Flyers.

Lilja was a member of the 2008 Stanley Cup winning Red Wings, and was one of several Swedish players Detroit boasted on their roster.

== Playing career ==
Lilja was drafted in the 2nd round, 54th overall by the Los Angeles Kings in the 2000 NHL entry draft. During the 2002–03 NHL season, Lilja was traded to the Florida Panthers where he played for the remainder of the season. In the summer of 2004, he was signed by the Nashville Predators, but never played for them because of the NHL lockout, during which he played for Mora IK and the Malmö IF Redhawks of Elitserien, as well as HC Ambri-Piotta of the Swiss National League A. Once the lockout ended, he was signed to a one-year deal by the Detroit Red Wings. After playing in all 82 regular season games for the Red Wings in the 2005–06 NHL season, he was re-signed by the team to a two-year deal in the summer of 2006. Lilja was re-signed again to another two-year deal in the summer of 2008.

Lilja won the 2008 Stanley Cup as a member of the Red Wings. He is also one of nine native Swedes who played for the team at that time. On October 10, 2010, after being released from a tryout with the San Jose Sharks, Lilja signed a one-year contract with the Anaheim Ducks.

Lilja signed a two-year, $1.475 million contract with the Philadelphia Flyers on July 1, 2011.

On April 6, 2013, Lilja signed a two-year contract with Rögle BK which began with the 2013–14 season. He retired following the 2014–15 season.

== Personal life ==
Lilja and his wife Lotta have two daughters. The family resides in Royal Oak, Michigan.

== Career statistics ==
			Regular season					Playoffs
Season	Team	League	GP	G	A	Pts	PIM	GP	G	A	Pts	PIM
1993–94	Malmö IF	SWE U20	14	3	7	10	38	—	—	—	—	—
1994–95	Malmö IF	J20	30	7	13	20	82	—	—	—	—	—
1994–95	Malmö IF	SEL	3	0	0	0	2	—	—	—	—	—
1995–96	Malmö IF	J20	3	0	1	1	6	—	—	—	—	—
1995–96	Malmö IF	SEL	40	1	5	6	63	5	0	1	1	2
1996–97	MIF Redhawks	SEL	47	1	0	1	22	4	0	0	0	10
1997–98	MIF Redhawks	SEL	10	0	0	0	0	—	—	—	—	—
1997–98	Mora IK	Div.1	13	1	4	5	30	4	1	0	1	14
1998–99	MIF Redhawks	SEL	41	0	3	3	44	1	0	0	0	4
1999–2000	MIF Redhawks	SEL	49	8	11	19	88	6	0	0	0	8
2000–01	Lowell Lock Monsters	AHL	61	7	29	36	149	4	0	6	6	6
2000–01	Los Angeles Kings	NHL	2	0	0	0	4	1	0	0	0	0
2001–02	Manchester Monarchs	AHL	4	0	1	1	4	—	—	—	—	—
2001–02	Los Angeles Kings	NHL	26	1	4	5	22	5	0	0	0	6
2002–03	Los Angeles Kings	NHL	17	0	3	3	14	—	—	—	—	—
2002–03	Florida Panthers	NHL	56	4	8	12	56	—	—	—	—	—
2003–04	Florida Panthers	NHL	79	3	4	7	90	—	—	—	—	—
2004–05	Mora IK	SEL	44	3	8	11	67	—	—	—	—	—
2004–05	HC Ambrì–Piotta	NLA	—	—	—	—	—	5	0	2	2	6
2005–06	Detroit Red Wings	NHL	82	2	13	15	98	6	0	1	1	6
2006–07	Detroit Red Wings	NHL	57	0	5	5	54	18	1	0	1	10
2007–08	Detroit Red Wings	NHL	79	2	10	12	93	12	0	1	1	16
2008–09	Detroit Red Wings	NHL	60	2	11	13	66	—	—	—	—	—
2009–10	Detroit Red Wings	NHL	20	1	1	2	4	11	0	0	0	14
2009–10	Grand Rapids Griffins	AHL	4	0	0	0	6	—	—	—	—	—
2010–11	Anaheim Ducks	NHL	52	1	6	7	28	3	0	0	0	0
2011–12	Philadelphia Flyers	NHL	46	0	6	6	34	10	0	0	0	6
2011–12	Adirondack Phantoms	AHL	1	0	0	0	0	—	—	—	—	—
2012–13	Adirondack Phantoms	AHL	33	1	7	8	44	—	—	—	—	—
2012–13	Philadelphia Flyers	NHL	4	0	0	0	0	—	—	—	—	—
2013–14	Rögle BK	Allsv	52	1	7	8	90	16	0	2	2	10
2014–15	Rögle BK	Allsv	49	0	11	11	54	9	0	1	1	8
SEL totals			234	13	27	40	286	16	0	1	1	24
NHL totals			580	16	71	87	563	66	1	2	3	58
