= Jiří Hudler =

Czech ice hockey player (born 1984)

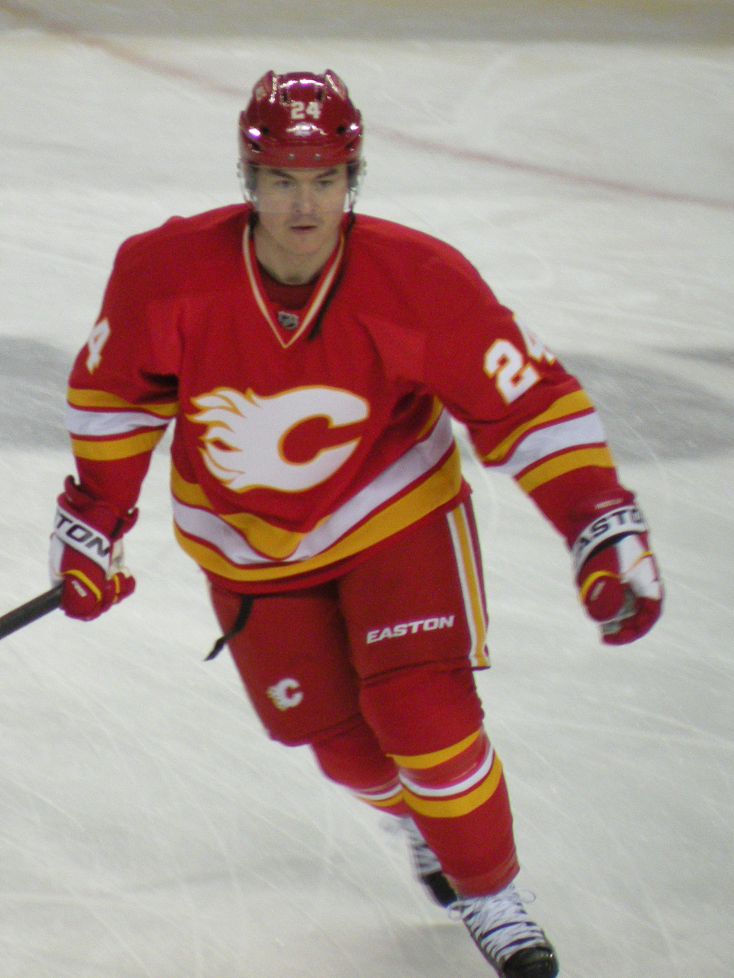
- Hudler with the Calgary Flames in 2013
- Born: 4 January 1984 (age 42) Olomouc, Czechoslovakia
- Height: 5 ft 10 in (178 cm)
- Weight: 190 lb (86 kg; 13 st 8 lb)
- Position: Right wing
- Shot: Left
- Played for: HC Vsetín; Havířov Panthers; Ak Bars Kazan; Detroit Red Wings; Dynamo Moscow; Lev Praha; HC Oceláři Třinec; Calgary Flames; Florida Panthers; Dallas Stars
- National team: Czech Republic
- NHL draft: 58th overall, 2002; Detroit Red Wings
- Playing career: 1999–2017

Jiří Hudler (/ˈjɪriː ˈhʊdlər/; Czech: [ˈjɪr̝iː ˈɦudlɛr]; born 4 January 1984) is a Czech former professional ice hockey forward. He played with the Detroit Red Wings, Calgary Flames, Florida Panthers and the Dallas Stars of the National Hockey League (NHL). After beginning his career in the Czech Extraliga with HC Vsetín, Hudler was drafted by the Detroit Red Wings in the 2002 NHL entry draft and won the Stanley Cup with the club in 2008. Hudler also played for Dynamo Moscow in the Kontinental Hockey League (KHL) for one season before the team was merged to form UHC Dynamo.

== Playing career ==
=== Early years ===
Hudler spent his youth in the elite Czech Extraliga with HC Vsetín, beginning in the 1999–2000 season. After recording a point-per-game season with the club in 2001–02, he was drafted by the Detroit Red Wings with their first pick in the second round, 58th overall, of the 2002 NHL entry draft. He remained in the Extraliga the following season, including a brief stint with Ak Bars Kazan of the Russian Superleague (RSL), before moving to North America for the 2003–04 season. Although he competed in 12 games for the Red Wings that season, he played the majority of the campaign with Detroit's American Hockey League (AHL) affiliate, the Grand Rapids Griffins, scoring 49 points in 57 games in his rookie AHL season. Due to the 2004–05 NHL lockout, Hudler remained in the AHL the following season while also returning to play with Vsetín for seven games. Although NHL play resumed in 2005–06, he played his third season with the Griffins, breaking-out with 36 goals and 96 points in 76 games to be named to the AHL Second All-Star Team. His 60 assists established a single-season Griffins team-record.

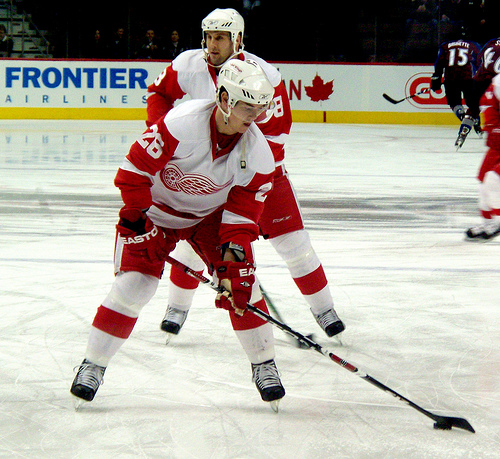
Hudler played six seasons in Detroit

Hudler finally broke through onto the Red Wings roster in 2006–07 and scored 25 points in 76 games to be chosen team rookie of the year by the Detroit Sports Broadcasters Association. No one in the NHL scored more goals in fewer average minutes per game (10:02) than Hudler. Hudler played sporadically in the 2007 playoffs, however, often splitting time with Kyle Calder. He contributed two assists in six games. Former Wings teammate and fellow Czech Robert Lang took Hudler under his wing when Hudler joined the team. Hudler spent time living in Lang's home when he first arrived in the United States, and Lang even went so far as to call Hudler "a third son". Following his rookie NHL season, Hudler spent time during the off-season training with fellow NHLers Chris Chelios, Mathieu Schneider and Rob Blake in Southern California. As a result, he said that he felt faster and stronger.

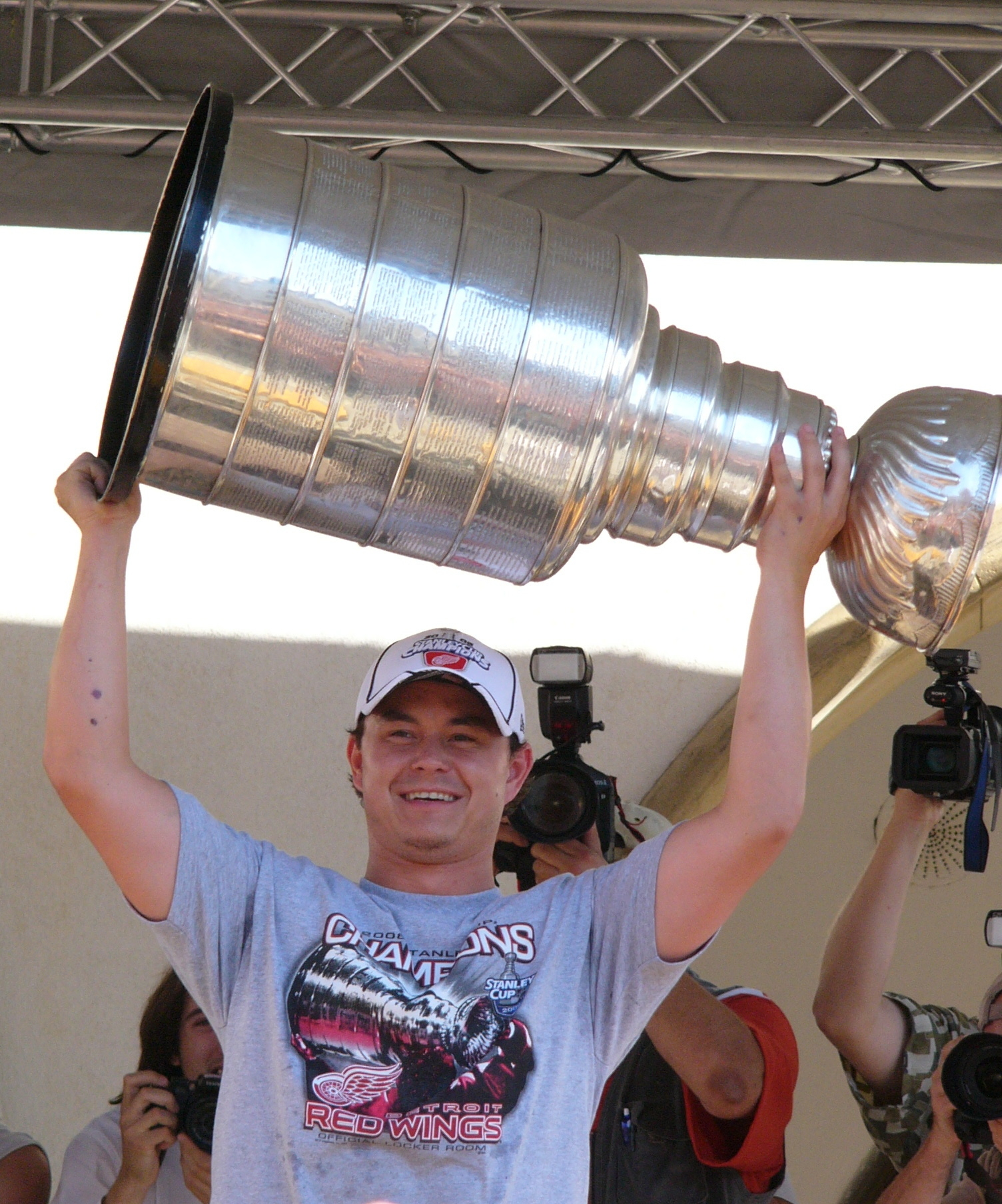
Jiří Hudler holding the Stanley Cup

Playing in his second full season with the Red Wings, Hudler improved to 42 points. On 4 June 2008, he won the Stanley Cup as a member of the Red Wings, scoring five goals and adding nine assists during Detroit's successful playoff run, including the game-winning goal in game four of the Final against the Pittsburgh Penguins. He continued to improve in 2008–09, notching 23 goals and 57 points. However, facing the Penguins once again in the 2009 Final, Hudler and the Red Wings failed to defend their championship, losing in seven games.

=== Dynamo Moscow ===
Becoming a restricted free agent in the off-season, Hudler filed for arbitration with the Red Wings. However, soon thereafter, he signed a contract with Dynamo Moscow of the Kontinental Hockey League (KHL) for $10 million over two years on 8 July 2009, while his arbitration case with the Red Wings was later settled at $5.75 million over the same term. In response to Hudler's signing with Dynamo Moscow, USA Hockey filed an appeal to the International Ice Hockey Federation (IIHF) alleging that Hudler was still under contract with the Red Wings. Pending the IIHF's investigation, Hudler was not granted a transfer card, which would have either prevented him from playing in the KHL or caused the league sanctions. The IIHF later approved Hudler's KHL contract on 9 September 2009, revealing that although Hudler's agent had filed for the arbitration case on his client's behalf, Hudler had not actually signed for the case himself, rendering the arbitration case invalid. Further, the IIHF ruled that USA Hockey had failed to submit their appeal within the required timeline.

=== Return to Detroit ===
After one season with Dynamo Moscow, Hudler was released by the team on 18 April 2010, just four days before Dynamo was merged into "UHC Dynamo" (later to return to "Dynamo Moscow"). Eight days later, Hudler returned to the same Red Wings team he had left following his 2009 arbitration case, for two years at $2.875 million per season, the same contract he would have received in arbitration in 2009. Despite reaching a settlement with the team, he was ineligible to return for the 2010 playoffs, as he was not an active roster player before the NHL trade deadline. Hudler would return for the 2010–11 season.

=== Calgary Flames ===
On 2 July 2012, Hudler signed a four-year, $16 million contract with the Calgary Flames worth $4 million per year. In the 2014–15 season, Hudler set career-highs in NHL points, scoring 76 points in 78 games and helping the Flames reach the Stanley Cup playoffs for the first time in six years. He was also nominated for the Lady Byng Trophy, awarded to the NHL's most sportsmanlike player, which he was named the winner of on 24 June.

=== Florida Panthers and Dallas Stars ===
During the 2015–16 season, on 27 February 2016, Hudler, in the final year of his contract with the Flames, was traded to the Florida Panthers in exchange for second- and fourth-round picks in the 2016 and 2018 NHL entry drafts, respectively.

Becoming a free agent in the subsequent off-season, on 23 August 2016, Hudler signed a one-year, $2 million contract with the Dallas Stars.

== Airplane incident ==
On October 4, 2017, it was reported that Hudler has been accused of a belligerent outburst on a flight from New York to Prague. Reportedly, he asked a flight attendant for cocaine and when he did not get it, he threatened to have her murdered and attempted to urinate on a food cart.

== Career statistics ==
=== Regular season and playoffs ===
			Regular season					Playoffs
Season	Team	League	GP	G	A	Pts	PIM	GP	G	A	Pts	PIM
1999–2000	HC Slovnaft Vsetín	CZE U20	47	25	28	53	73	6	4	3	7	2
1999–2000	HC Slovnaft Vsetín	ELH	2	0	1	1	0	—	—	—	—	—
2000–01	HC Slovnaft Vsetín	CZE U20	16	8	14	22	16	—	—	—	—	—
2000–01	HC Slovnaft Vsetín	ELH	22	1	4	5	10	—	—	—	—	—
2000–01	HC Femax Havířov	ELH	15	5	1	6	12	—	—	—	—	—
2001–02	HC Vsetín	ELH	46	15	31	46	54	—	—	—	—	—
2001–02	Bílí Tygři Liberec	CZE.2	1	1	2	3	0	12	8	5	13	10
2001–02	HC Olomouc	CZE.3	1	0	2	2	4	—	—	—	—	—
2002–03	HC Vsetín	ELH	30	19	27	46	23	—	—	—	—	—
2002–03	Ak Bars Kazan	RSL	11	1	5	6	12	1	0	0	0	0
2003–04	Detroit Red Wings	NHL	12	1	2	3	10	—	—	—	—	—
2003–04	Grand Rapids Griffins	AHL	57	17	32	49	46	4	1	5	6	2
2004–05	Vsetínská hokejová	ELH	7	5	2	7	10	—	—	—	—	—
2004–05	Grand Rapids Griffins	AHL	52	12	22	34	10	—	—	—	—	—
2005–06	Grand Rapids Griffins	AHL	76	36	60	96	56	16	6	16	22	20
2005–06	Detroit Red Wings	NHL	4	0	0	0	2	—	—	—	—	—
2006–07	Detroit Red Wings	NHL	76	15	10	25	36	6	0	2	2	4
2007–08	Detroit Red Wings	NHL	81	13	29	42	26	22	5	9	14	14
2008–09	Detroit Red Wings	NHL	82	23	34	57	16	23	4	8	12	6
2009–10	Dynamo Moscow	KHL	54	19	35	54	18	4	0	1	1	4
2010–11	Detroit Red Wings	NHL	73	10	27	37	28	4	1	2	3	0
2011–12	Detroit Red Wings	NHL	81	25	25	50	42	5	2	0	2	4
2012–13	Lev Praha	KHL	4	0	1	1	2	—	—	—	—	—
2012–13	HC Oceláři Třinec	ELH	4	3	2	5	4	—	—	—	—	—
2012–13	Calgary Flames	NHL	42	10	17	27	22	—	—	—	—	—
2013–14	Calgary Flames	NHL	75	17	37	54	16	—	—	—	—	—
2014–15	Calgary Flames	NHL	78	31	45	76	14	11	4	4	8	2
2015–16	Calgary Flames	NHL	53	10	25	35	17	—	—	—	—	—
2015–16	Florida Panthers	NHL	19	6	5	11	10	6	0	1	1	4
2016–17	Dallas Stars	NHL	32	3	8	11	4	—	—	—	—	—
ELH totals			126	48	68	116	116	—	—	—	—	—
NHL totals			708	164	264	428	243	83	16	26	42	40
KHL totals			69	20	41	61	68	5	0	1	1	4

Medal record

Representing Czech Republic

Men's ice hockey

World U18 Championships
Bronze medal – third place	2002 Slovakia	

=== International ===
Year	Team	Event	Result	GP	G	A	Pts	PIM
2000	Czech Republic	U17	5th	5	2	4	6	0
2000	Czech Republic	WJC18	6th	6	0	2	2	8
2002	Czech Republic	WJC18	3rd place, bronze medalist(s)	8	7	7	14	8
2002	Czech Republic	WJC	7th	7	1	2	3	0
2003	Czech Republic	WJC	6th	6	3	4	7	2
2003	Czech Republic	WC	4th	9	2	4	6	2
2004	Czech Republic	WJC	4th	7	2	3	5	6
2013	Czech Republic	WC	7th	8	4	1	5	6
2014	Czech Republic	WC	4th	10	1	3	4	8
Junior totals				39	15	22	37	24
Senior totals				27	7	8	15	16

== Awards and records ==
- 2005–06 — AHL Second All-Star Team
- 2005–06 — AHL Grand Rapids Griffins team record with 60 assists.
- 2006–07 — Hudler was named "Detroit Red Wings Rookie of the Year" by the Detroit Sports Broadcasters Association.
- 2007–08 — NHL Stanley Cup (Detroit Red Wings)
- 2014–15 — Lady Byng Memorial Trophy

Awards and achievements
Preceded by Ryan O'Reilly	Winner of the Lady Byng Memorial Trophy; 2015	Succeeded by Anže Kopitar
