= Johan Franzén =

Swedish ice hockey player (born 1979)

Johan Franzen
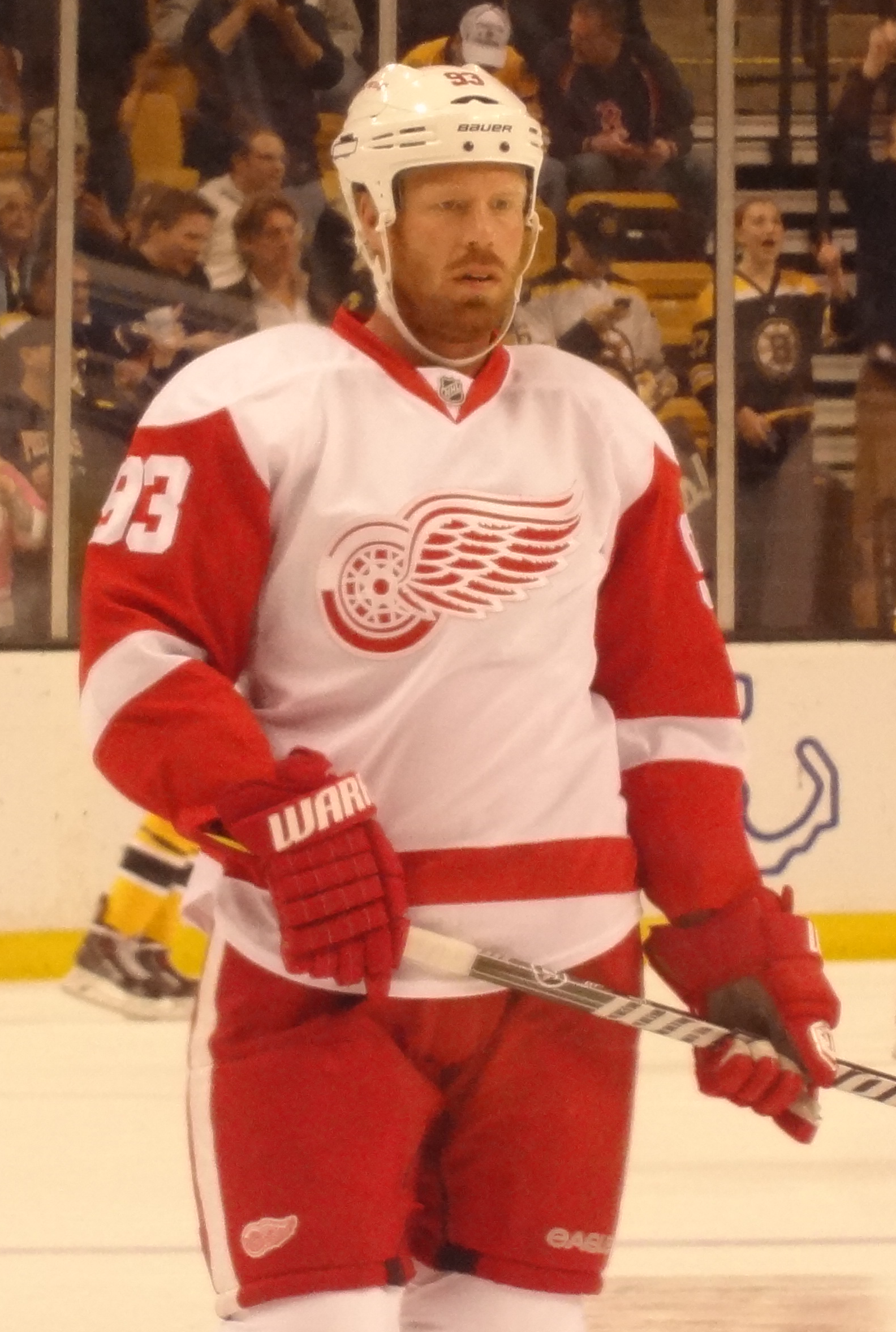
- Franzen with the Detroit Red Wings in 2013
- Born: 23 December 1979 (age 46) Vetlanda, Sweden
- Height: 6 ft 3 in (191 cm)
- Weight: 220 lb (100 kg; 15 st 10 lb)
- Position: Left wing
- Shot: Left
- Played for: Linköpings HC; Detroit Red Wings
- National team: Sweden
- NHL draft: 97th overall, 2004; Detroit Red Wings
- Playing career: 1999–2016

Johan Marcus Gunnar Franzén (pronounced [ˈjûːan franˈseːn]; born 23 December 1979) is a Swedish former professional ice hockey winger who played 11 seasons for the Detroit Red Wings of the National Hockey League (NHL). His career ended early in the 2015–16 season due to post-concussion syndrome. He also played for Linköpings HC in the Elitserien (later Swedish Hockey League).

Franzén was drafted by the Red Wings in the third round, 97th overall, of the 2004 NHL entry draft and won the Stanley Cup with the team in 2008.

== Playing career ==
=== Linköpings HC ===
Franzén began playing ice hockey in Boro/Vetlanda HC, Landsbro near Vetlanda in Sweden. He was suspended for a full year after knocking down a referee, but was then moved to play with the Tranås AIF in the Swedish Allsvenskan in 1999. After one season with the club, he moved to Linköpings HC, where he stayed for five seasons, helping the club win the promotion for play in the Swedish top-level Elitserien in 2001. Recommended by European scout Håkan Andersson, Franzén was drafted by the Red Wings in 2004 in the third round, 97th overall.

=== Detroit Red Wings (2005–2016) ===
For the 2005–06 season, Franzén played in the NHL with Detroit, totaling 80 games for 16 points (12 goals and four assists) in his rookie season. His workmanlike service was lauded by former teammate and captain Steve Yzerman, who gave him the nickname "The Mule" because "he carries the load." (Franzen's rookie season was also Yzerman's final NHL season) Franzén was named "Detroit Red Wings Rookie of the Year" by the Detroit Sports Broadcasters' Association for his play during the season.

In August 2006, Franzén re-signed with Detroit on a three-year, $2.825 million contract. On 21 April 2007, during a Stanley Cup playoff game against the Calgary Flames, Flames goaltender Jamie McLennan slashed Franzén twice in the leg. McLennan was due to be assessed a minor penalty. However, after play was stopped, McLennan again violently slashed Franzén in the stomach, resulting in a game misconduct for McLennan. In the following game, game six, Franzén scored the winning goal in double-overtime to advance the Red Wings past the Flames.

On 30 March 2008, Franzén scored his sixth game-winning goal for the month of March, against the Nashville Predators. This goal broke the Red Wings team record for most game-winning goals in one month (5) set by Gordie Howe in February 1952, and duplicated in January 1956. (Howe's feat was matched by Franzén's teammate Henrik Zetterberg in January 2007.) Coincidentally, Franzén broke Howe's record while Howe was attending the game and celebrating his 80th birthday. Franzén scored his first career NHL hat-trick against the Colorado Avalanche in game two of the Western Conference Semifinals of the 2008 playoffs. It was the Red Wings' first playoff hat-trick since Darren McCarty scored three goals on 18 May 2002, also against the Avalanche. During game four, on 1 May 2008, Franzén had another hat-trick, scoring his ninth goal of the series, breaking the Detroit Red Wings franchise record for most goals in a playoff series: Gordie Howe had scored eight goals in a seven-game series in 1949.

Franzén currently holds the franchise record (tied with Henrik Zetterberg) for most goals in a playoff year with 13, a record previously held at ten by Petr Klíma, Sergei Fedorov, and Brett Hull. Zetterberg tied his mark of 13 goals after scoring the Cup winning goal in game six of the 2008 Stanley Cup Final against the Pittsburgh Penguins.

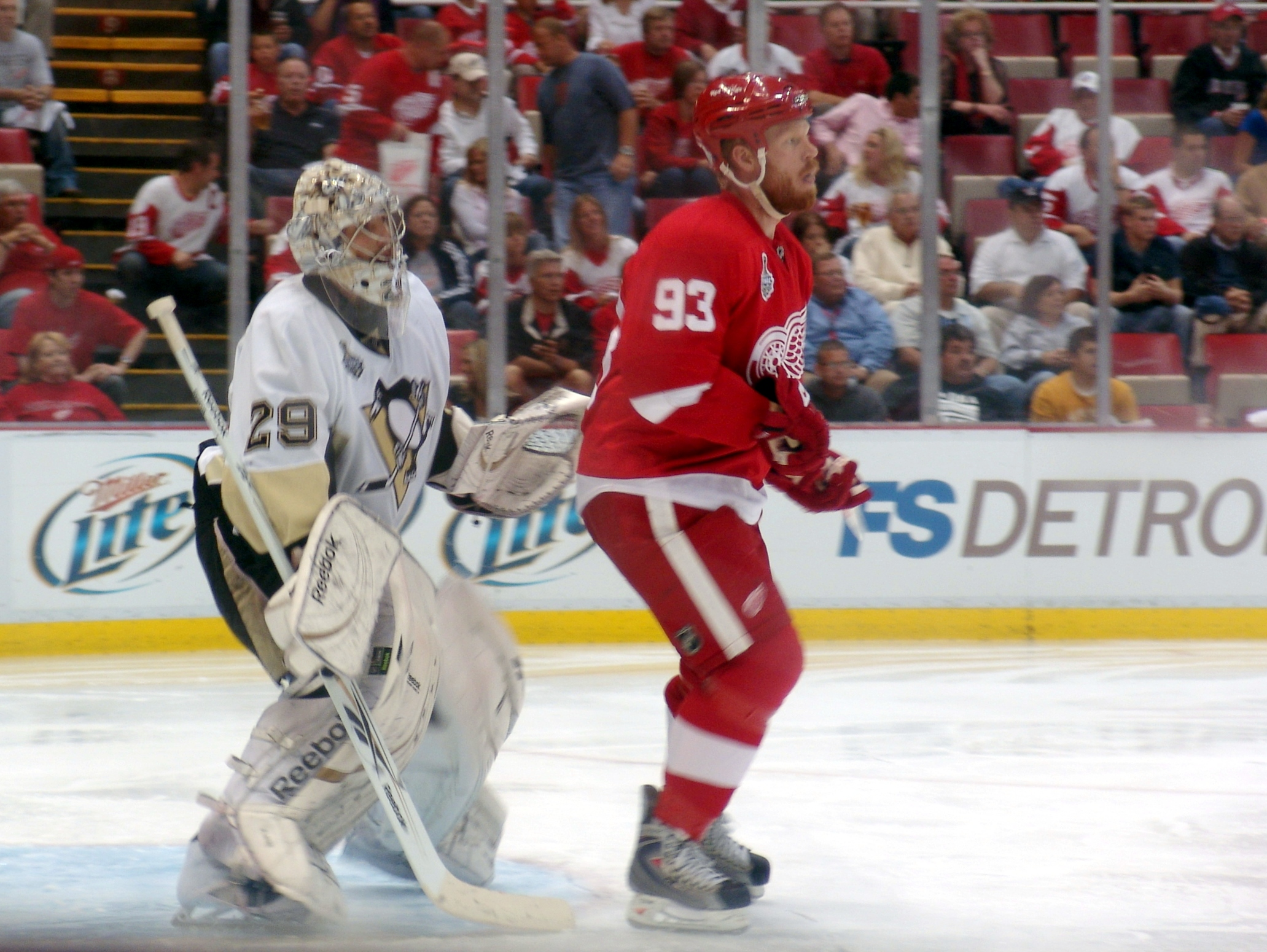
Franzén sets up in front of Marc-André Fleury in game five of the 2009 Finals.

On 11 April 2009, Franzén signed a contract extension with the Red Wings for 11 years. On 24 May, in game four of the Western Conference Finals in an 6–1 victory against the Chicago Blackhawks for a 3–1 series lead, Franzén was involved in a minor scrum behind the net after the whistle. Franzén was exchanging words with Blackhawks’ forward Patrick Kane when Kane began chewing on his mouth guard. Franzén reached down and ripped the mouth guard out of Kane's mouth and threw it down to the ice.

On 8 October 2009, Franzén suffered a torn anterior cruciate ligament (ACL) in a 3–2 win over the Chicago Blackhawks, forcing him to miss 55 games before he was able to return to Detroit's lineup in a game against the St. Louis Blues on 9 February 2010, where he recorded an assist on a Pavel Datsyuk goal as the Red Wings lost 4–3. Following Detroit's next game, he recorded his first goal since returning from injury. On 6 May, Franzén scored three goals in a span of 3:26 (two seconds shy of the NHL record for fastest playoff hat-trick) in the first period of Detroit's Western Conference Semifinal game four against the top-seeded San Jose Sharks, with the team facing elimination. He had been initially credited with another goal, scored two minutes before his first credited goal of the night, but this was later corrected to an assist on a Todd Bertuzzi redirect. While this goal would not have grabbed him the NHL record fastest hat-trick, he did eventually reclaim his tally by scoring a fourth goal later on in the game as the Red Wings won 7–1 to extend the series to a fifth game where they would go onto lose 2–1 to lose the series in five.

On 2 February 2011, Franzén became only the second player in 14 years, joining Marián Gáborík, to score five goals in one game. He tallied two even strength goals, two power play goals and added an empty net goal in a 7–5 victory over the Ottawa Senators. He joins Sergei Fedorov and Syd Howe as the only Red Wings to do so.

On 3 March 2014, Franzén was named NHL's First Star of the Week. He recorded three goals and two assists in two games to help lead the Red Wings to consecutive road victories.

Franzén missed the remainder of the season due to concussion symptoms after he was blindsided by a check late in a game at Edmonton by the Oilers' Rob Klinkhammer on 6 January 2015.

After being deemed medically fit to return in the 2015–2016 season, Franzén would play only two games before the return of concussion symptoms and was put on the team's long-term injury reserve list. Franzén's contract expired in 2020, when the NHL season was cut short by the COVID-19 pandemic.

== International play ==
Medal record

Ice hockey

Representing Sweden

World Championships
Gold medal – first place	2006 Latvia	

Franzén replaced Tomas Holmström at the 2010 Winter Olympics in Vancouver.

Franzén was replaced by teammate Gustav Nyquist at the 2014 Winter Olympics in Sochi due to a concussion.

== Personal life ==
Franzén and his girlfriend Cecilia married in 2009. The couple had their first child in March 2011 On 13 May 2013, Cecilia gave birth to their second son the day after the Red Wings won game seven of the Stanley Cup Quarterfinals against the Anaheim Ducks. The couple quietly divorced in 2020 after their move back to Sweden. Fans and the teammates alike often refer to Franzén as "The Mule," a nickname given to him by Steve Yzerman. "He's big and strong and he reminded me of a mule that day," Yzerman stated.

== Records ==
- NHL record for most goals in a 4-game playoff series (9).
- Detroit Red Wings record for most game-winning goals in one month, March 2008 (6).
- Detroit Red Wings record for most goals in a single playoff series (9).
- Detroit Red Wings record for consecutive playoff games with a point (12, tied with Gordie Howe)
- Detroit Red Wings record for consecutive playoff games with a goal (5, tied with Gordie Howe and Ted Lindsay).
- Detroit Red Wings record for most goals in a single playoff year (13, tied with Henrik Zetterberg).
- Detroit Red Wings record for most game-winning goals in one playoff year (5, 2008)
- Detroit Red Wings record for most points in a playoff game (6), 6 May 2010, vs. San Jose Sharks
- Detroit Red Wings record for most consecutive occasions where a Red Wings player scored 4 goals in a game (final game on that 5-game streak: 2 February 2011 at Ottawa Senators), the next one was by Anthony Mantha vs. Dallas Stars on 6 October 2019.

== Career statistics ==
=== Regular season and playoffs ===
Bold indicates led league

			Regular season					Playoffs
Season	Team	League	GP	G	A	Pts	PIM	GP	G	A	Pts	PIM
1994–95	Team Boro	SWE.3	5	1	0	1	2	—	—	—	—	—
1995–96	Team Boro	SWE.3	32	4	4	8	10	—	—	—	—	—
1996–97	Boro/Vetlanda	SWE.4	28	14	4	18	22	—	—	—	—	—
1996–97	HV71	J20	2	0	1	1		—	—	—	—	—
1997–98	Boro/Vetlanda	SWE.4	26	30	12	42	18	—	—	—	—	—
1998–99	Boro/Vetlanda	SWE.4	10	23	2	25	37	—	—	—	—	—
1999–2000	Tranås AIF	SWE.2	37	11	15	26	22	—	—	—	—	—
2000–01	Linköpings HC	SWE.2	41	12	20	32	26	10	3	3	6	0
2001–02	Linköpings HC	SEL	36	2	6	8	64	—	—	—	—	—
2002–03	Linköpings HC	SEL	37	2	4	6	14	—	—	—	—	—
2003–04	Linköpings HC	SEL	49	12	18	30	26	5	0	1	1	8
2004–05	Linköpings HC	SEL	43	7	7	14	45	6	2	0	2	16
2005–06	Detroit Red Wings	NHL	80	12	4	16	36	6	1	2	3	4
2006–07	Detroit Red Wings	NHL	69	10	20	30	37	18	3	4	7	10
2007–08	Detroit Red Wings	NHL	72	27	11	38	51	16	**13**	5	18	14
2008–09	Detroit Red Wings	NHL	71	34	25	59	44	23	12	11	23	12
2009–10	Detroit Red Wings	NHL	27	10	11	21	22	12	6	12	18	16
2010–11	Detroit Red Wings	NHL	76	28	27	55	58	8	2	1	3	6
2011–12	Detroit Red Wings	NHL	77	29	27	56	40	5	1	0	1	8
2012–13	Detroit Red Wings	NHL	41	14	17	31	41	14	4	2	6	8
2013–14	Detroit Red Wings	NHL	54	16	25	41	40	5	0	2	2	2
2014–15	Detroit Red Wings	NHL	33	7	15	22	30	—	—	—	—	—
2015–16	Detroit Red Wings	NHL	2	0	1	1	2	—	—	—	—	—
SHL totals			165	23	35	58	149	11	2	1	3	24
NHL totals			602	187	183	370	401	107	42	39	81	80

=== International ===
Year	Team	Event	Result	GP	G	A	Pts	PIM
2005	Sweden	WC	4th	5	1	0	1	0
2006	Sweden	WC	1st place, gold medalist(s)	8	0	3	3	12
2010	Sweden	OG	5th	4	1	1	2	2
2012	Sweden	WC	6th	7	4	5	9	8
Senior totals				24	6	9	15	22

== Awards and honours ==
Award	Year	Ref
NHL
Stanley Cup champion	2008	
