= List of Minnesota Wild records =

This is a list of franchise records for the Minnesota Wild of the National Hockey League. The franchise began play in the 2000–01 season and these records are updated through the 2023–24 season.

== Career regular season records ==
=== Skaters ===
Games played
#	Player	GP	Seasons
1	Mikko Koivu	1,028	2005–2020
2	Jared Spurgeon	933	2010–present
3	Jonas Brodin	853	2013–present
4	Nick Schultz	743	2001–2012
5	Ryan Suter	656	2012–2021
Active leader
2	Jared Spurgeon	933	2010–present

Goals
#	Player	G	Seasons
1	Kirill Kaprizov	220	2021–present
2	Marian Gaborik	219	2000–2009
3	Mikko Koivu	205	2005–2020
4	Zach Parise	199	2012–2021
5	Jason Zucker	132	2012–2020
Active leader
1	Kirill Kaprizov	220	2021–present

Assists
#	Player	A	Seasons
1	Mikko Koivu	504	2005–2020
2	Ryan Suter	314	2012–2021
3	Jared Spurgeon	274	2010–present
4	Pierre-Marc Bouchard	241	2002–2013
5	Mikael Granlund	224	2013–2019
Active leader
3	Jared Spurgeon	274	2010–present

Points
#	Player	Pts	Seasons
1	Mikko Koivu	709	2005–2020
2	Marian Gaborik	437	2000–2009
3	Zach Parise	400	2012–2021
4	Jared Spurgeon	384	2010–present
5	Ryan Suter	369	2012–2021
Active leader
4	Jared Spurgeon	384	2010–present

Penalty in minutes
#	Player	PIM	Seasons
1	Matt Johnson	698	2000–2004
2	Mikko Koivu	592	2005–2020
3	Derek Boogaard	544	2005–2010
4	Marcus Foligno	474	2017–present
5	Matt Dumba	399	2013–present
Active leader
4	Marcus Foligno	474	2017–present

Highest +/-
#	Player	+/-	Seasons
1	Jared Spurgeon	117	2010–present
2	Jonas Brodin	94	2013–present
3	Mikko Koivu	70	2005–2020
4	Ryan Suter	61	2012–2021
5	Joel Eriksson Ek	57	2016–present
Active leader
1	Jared Spurgeon	117	2010–present

Power-play goals
#	Player	PPG	Seasons
1	Zach Parise	69	2012–2021
2	Mikko Koivu	60	2005–2020
3	Marian Gaborik	59	2000–2009
4	Kirill Kaprizov	58	2021–present
5	Andrew Brunette	55	2001–2004, 2008–2011
Active leader
4	Kirill Kaprizov	58	2021–present

Short-handed goals
#	Player	SHG	Seasons
1	Wes Walz	14	2000–2008
2	Mikko Koivu	10	2005–2020
3	Brian Rolston	7	2005–2008
3	Mikael Granlund	7	2013–2019
5	2 players tied	6	––
Active leader
T-8	Frederick Gaudreau	4	2021–present

Game winning goals
#	Player	GWG	Seasons
1	Marian Gaborik	43	2000–2009
2	Zach Parise	39	2000–2004
3	Mikko Koivu	33	2005–2020
4	Eric Staal	23	2016–2020
5	Jason Zucker	22	2012–2020
Active leader
T–5	Kirill Kaprizov	22	2021–present

Points per game
#	Player	P/G	Seasons
1	Kirill Kaprizov	1.19	2020–present
2	Marian Gaborik	.87	2000–2009
2	Mats Zuccarello	.87	2019–present
4	Kevin Fiala	.86	2019–2022
5	Pavol Demitra	.85	2006–2008
Active leader
1	Kirill Kaprizov	1.19	2020–present

=== Goaltenders ===
Games played
#	Player	GP	Seasons
1	Niklas Backstrom	409	2006–2016
2	Devan Dubnyk	328	2015–2020
3	Manny Fernandez	260	2000–2007
4	Dwayne Roloson	167	2001–2006
5	Josh Harding	151	2006–2014
Active leader
7	Marc-Andre Fleury	97	2022–present

Wins
1	Niklas Backstrom	194	2006–2016
2	Devan Dubnyk	177	2015–2020
3	Manny Fernandez	113	2000–2007
4	Dwayne Roloson	62	2001–2006
5	Josh Harding	60	2006–2014
Active leader
7	Marc-Andre Fleury	50	2022–present

Losses
#	Player	L	Seasons
1	Niklas Backstrom	142	2006–2016
2	Devan Dubnyk	113	2015–2020
3	Manny Fernandez	102	2000–2007
4	Dwayne Roloson	71	2001–2006
5	Josh Harding	59	2006–2014
Active leader
7	Marc-Andre Fleury	33	2022–present

Goals against average
#	Player	GAA	Seasons
1	Dwayne Roloson	2.28	2001–2006
2	Devan Dubnyk	2.41	2015–2020
3	Josh Harding	2.45	2006–2014
4	Manny Fernandez	2.47	2000–2007
5	Niklas Backstrom	2.48	2006–2016
Active leader
T–6	Filip Gustavsson	2.60	2022–present

Save percentage
#	Player	SV%	Seasons
1	Dwayne Roloson	.919	2001–2006
2	Josh Harding	.918	2006–2014
2	Devan Dubnyk	.918	2015–2020
4	Niklas Backstrom	.915	2006–2016
4	Filip Gustavsson	.915	2022–present
Active leader
T–4	Filip Gustavsson	.931	2022–present

Shutouts
#	Player	SO	Seasons
1	Niklas Backstrom	28	2006–2016
2	Devan Dubnyk	23	2015–2020
3	Dwayne Roloson	15	2001–2006
4	Manny Fernandez	12	2000–2007
5	Josh Harding	10	2006–2014
Active leader
7	Filip Gustavsson	6	2022–present

== Single season records ==
=== Skaters ===
Goals
#	Player	G	Season
1	Kirill Kaprizov	47	2021–22
2	Kirill Kaprizov	46	2023–24
3	Marian Gaborik	42	2007–08
3	Eric Staal	42	2017–18
5	Kirill Kaprizov	40	2022–23

Assists
#	Player	A	Season
1	Kirill Kaprizov	61	2021-22
2	Mats Zuccarello	55	2021-22
3	Kevin Fiala	52	2021-22
4	Mats Zuccarello	51	2023-24
5	Pierre-Marc Bouchard	50	2007–08

Points
#	Player	P	Season
1	Kirill Kaprizov	108	2021–22
2	Kirill Kaprizov	96	2023–24
3	Kevin Fiala	85	2021–22
4	Marian Gaborik	83	2007–08
5	Brian Rolston	79	2005–06

Points (Defenseman)
#	Player	Pts	Season
1	Ryan Suter	51	2015–16
1	Ryan Suter	51	2017–18
3	Matt Dumba	50	2017–18
4	Ryan Suter	48	2019–20
5	Brock Faber	47	2023–24

Points (rookie)
#	Player	Pts	Season
1	Kirill Kaprizov	51	2020–21
2	Brock Faber	47	2023–24
3	Marco Rossi	40	2023–24
4	Matt Boldy	39	2021–22
5	Marian Gaborik	36	2000–01

Penalty in minutes
#	Player	PIM	Season
1	Matt Johnson	201	2002–03
2	Matt Johnson	183	2001–02
3	Matt Johnson	177	2003–04
4	Brad Staubitz	158	2010–11
5	Derek Boogaard	148	2005–06

Highest +/-
#	Player	+/-	Season
1	Alex Goligoski	41	2021–22
2	Jason Zucker	34	2016–17
3	Ryan Suter	33	2016–17
3	Jared Spurgeon	33	2016–17
5	Jared Spurgeon	32	2021–22

=== Goaltenders ===
Games played
#	Player	GP	Season
1	Niklas Backstrom	71	2008–09
2	Devan Dubnyk	67	2015–16
2	Devan Dubnyk	67	2018–19
4	Devan Dubnyk	65	2016–17
5	Niklas Backstrom	60	2009–10

Wins
#	Player	W	Season
1	Devan Dubnyk	40	2016–17
2	Niklas Backstrom	37	2008–09
3	Devan Dubnyk	35	2017–18
4	Niklas Backstrom	33	2007–08
5	Cam Talbot	32	2021–22
5	Devan Dubnyk	32	2015–16

Losses
#	Player	L	Season
1	Devan Dubnyk	28	2018–19
2	Devan Dubnyk	26	2015–16
3	Manny Fernandez	24	2001–02
3	Niklas Backstrom	24	2008–09
5	Jamie McLennan	23	2000–01

Goals against average
#	Player	GAA	Season
1	Josh Harding	1.66	2013–14
2	Devan Dubnyk	1.78	2014–15
3	Dwayne Roloson	1.88	2003–04
4	Niklas Backstrom	1.97	2006–07
5	Dwayne Roloson	2.00	2002–03

Save percentage
#	Player	SV%	Season
1	Devan Dubnyk	.936	2014–15
2	Josh Harding	.933	2013–14
2	Dwayne Roloson	.933	2003–04
4	Filip Gustavsson	.931	2022–23
5	Niklas Backstrom	.929	2006–07

Shutouts
#	Player	SO	Season
1	Niklas Backstrom	8	2008–09
2	Devan Dubnyk	5	2014–15
2	Niklas Backstrom	5	2006–07
2	Dwayne Roloson	5	2001–02
2	Dwayne Roloson	5	2003–04
2	Devan Dubnyk	5	2017–18
2	Devan Dubnyk	5	2016–17
2	Devan Dubnyk	5	2015–16

== Career playoff records ==
=== Skaters ===
Games played
#	Player	GP	Seasons
1	Jared Spurgeon	78	2010–present
1	Jonas Brodin	78	2013–present
3	Mikko Koivu	59	2005–2020
4	Ryan Suter	49	2012–2021
4	Matt Dumba	49	2013–present
Active leader
T-1	Jared Spurgeon	78	2010–present

Goals
#	Player	G	Seasons
1	Kirill Kaprizov	17	2021–present
2	Zach Parise	16	2012–2021
3	Marian Gaborik	12	2000–2009
4	Mikko Koivu	11	2005–2020
5	Jason Pominville	9	2013–2017
Active leader
1	Kirill Kaprizov	17	2021–present

Assists
#	Player	A	Seasons
1	Zach Parise	21	2012–2021
1	Jared Spurgeon	21	2010–present
3	Mikko Koivu	17	2005–2020
4	Ryan Suter	16	2012–2021
5	2 players tied	14	– –
Active leader
T–1	Jared Spurgeon	21	2010–present

Points
#	Player	Pts	Seasons
1	Zach Parise	37	2012–2021
2	Jared Spurgeon	31	2010–present
3	Kirill Kaprizov	30	2021–present
4	Mikko Koivu	28	2005–2020
5	Jason Pominville	23	2013–2017
Active leader
2	Jared Spurgeon	31	2010–present

Penalty in minutes
#	Player	PIM	Seasons
1	Marcus Foligno	70	2017–present
2	Derek Boogaard	44	2005–2010
3	Matt Dumba	39	2013–present
4	Mikko Koivu	38	2005–2020
5	Stephane Veilleux	35	2002–2009
Active leader
1	Marcus Foligno	70	2013–present

== Single game ==
=== Regular ===
==== Skaters ====
- Goals: Marian Gaborik, 5 (December 20, 2007)
- Assists: Kevin Fiala, 5 (April 22, 2022)
- Points: Marian Gaborik, 6 (twice - October 26, 2002, and December 20, 2007)
- Penalty minutes: Stu Bickel, 39 (January 3, 2015)
- Plus/minus: Jared Spurgeon, +5 (three times) - four other Wild skaters also have a +5 in a single game

== Team records ==
=== Regular season ===
- NHL playoff appearances: 11
- Most games won, season: 53 (2021-22)
- Most points in a single season: 113 (2021-22)
- Longest winning streak: 12 games (2016-17)
- Most games lost, season: 39 (2000-01)
- Longest losing streak: 6 games (2013-14)
- Most goals scored, season: 283 and counting (2021-22)
- Most goals scored, game: 10 February 19th, 2024
- Most goals scored, period: 6 (February 22, 2015)
- Most assists, season: 465 and counting (2021-22)
- Most player points, season: 743 and counting (2021-22)
- Most player points, game: 24 (8 goals, 16 assists - February 27, 2018)
- Most player points, period: 15 (6 goals, 9 assists - February 22, 2015)
- Most penalties in minutes, season: 1189 (2005-06)
- Most penalties in minutes, game: 57 (twice - March 2, 2002, and January 3, 2015)
- Most penalties in minutes, period: 51 (January 3, 2015)
- Hat tricks, franchise: 30
- Hat tricks, season: 4 (2017-18)

== See also ==
- List of Minnesota Wild players
- List of Minnesota Wild seasons
