= List of Minnesota Wild award winners =

Minnesota Wild awards

Team trophies
- Award*: Wins
- Stanley Cup: 0

Individual awards
- Award*: Wins
- Bill Masterton Memorial Trophy: 2
- Calder Memorial Trophy: 1
- General Manager of the Year Award: 1
- Jack Adams Award: 1
- King Clancy Memorial Trophy: 3
- Lester Patrick Trophy: 1
- Roger Crozier Saving Grace Award: 2
- William M. Jennings Trophy: 1

Total
- Awards won: 12

This is a list of Minnesota Wild award winners.

== League awards ==
=== Team trophies ===
The Minnesota Wild have not won any of the team trophies the National Hockey League (NHL) awards annually — the Stanley Cup as league champions, the Clarence S. Campbell Bowl as Western Conference playoff champions and the Presidents' Trophy as the team with the most regular season points.

=== Individual awards ===
Individual awards won by Minnesota Wild players and staff
Award	Description	Winner	Season	References
Bill Masterton Memorial Trophy	Perseverance, sportsmanship and dedication to hockey	Josh Harding	2012–13	
Bill Masterton Memorial Trophy	Perseverance, sportsmanship and dedication to hockey	Devan Dubnyk	2014–15	
Calder Memorial Trophy	Rookie of the year	Kirill Kaprizov	2020–21	
Jack Adams Award	Top coach during the regular season	Jacques Lemaire	2002–03	
General Manager of the Year Award	Top General Manager	Bill Guerin	2025–26	
King Clancy Memorial Trophy	Leadership qualities on and off the ice and humanitarian contributions within their community	Jason Zucker	2018–19	
King Clancy Memorial Trophy	Leadership qualities on and off the ice and humanitarian contributions within their community	Mathew Dumba	2019–20	
King Clancy Memorial Trophy	Leadership qualities on and off the ice and humanitarian contributions within their community	Marcus Foligno	2025–26	
Roger Crozier Saving Grace Award	Goaltender with the best save percentage	Dwayne Roloson	2003–04	
Roger Crozier Saving Grace Award	Goaltender with the best save percentage	Niklas Backstrom	2006–07	
William M. Jennings Trophy	Fewest goals given up in the regular season	Niklas Backstrom	2006–07	
William M. Jennings Trophy	Fewest goals given up in the regular season	Manny Fernandez	2006–07	

== All-Stars ==
=== NHL first and second team All-Stars ===
The NHL first and second team All-Stars are the top players at each position as voted on by the Professional Hockey Writers' Association.

Minnesota Wild selected to the NHL First and Second Team All-Stars
Player	Position	Selections	Season	Team
Devan Dubnyk	Goaltender	1	2014–15	2nd
Ryan Suter	Defense	1	2012–13	1st

=== NHL All-Rookie Team ===
The NHL All-Rookie Team consists of the top rookies at each position as voted on by the Professional Hockey Writers' Association.

Minnesota Wild selected to the NHL All-Rookie Team
Player	Position	Season
Jonas Brodin	Defense	2012–13
Brock Faber	Defense	2023–24
Kirill Kaprizov	Forward	2020–21
Marco Rossi	Forward	2023–24

=== All-Star Game selections ===
The National Hockey League All-Star Game is a mid-season exhibition game held annually between many of the top players of each season. Fourteen All-Star Games have been held since the Wild entered the league in 2000, with at least one player chosen to represent the Wild in each year except 2001 and 2002. The All-Star game has not been held in various years: 1979 and 1987 due to the 1979 Challenge Cup and Rendez-vous '87 series between the NHL and the Soviet national team, respectively, 1995, 2005 and 2013 as a result of labor stoppages, 2006, 2010, 2014 and 2026 because of the Winter Olympic Games, 2021 as a result of the COVID-19 pandemic, and 2025 when it was replaced by the 2025 4 Nations Face-Off. Minnesota has hosted one of the games. The 54th took place at Xcel Energy Center.

Minnesota Wild players and coaches selected to the All-Star Game
Game	Year	Name	Position	References
51st	2001	No Wild selected	—	
52nd	2002	No Wild selected	—	
53rd	2003	Marian Gaborik	Right wing	
54th	2004	Filip Kuba	Defense	
54th	2004	Dwayne Roloson	Goaltender	
55th	2007	Brian Rolston	Center	
56th	2008	Marian Gaborik	Right wing	
57th	2009	Niklas Backstrom	Goaltender	
58th	2011	Brent Burns	Defense	
58th	2011	Martin Havlat	Left wing	
59th	2012	Mikko Koivu (Did not play)	Center	
60th	2015	Ryan Suter	Defense	
61st	2016	Devan Dubnyk	Goaltender	
62nd	2017	Bruce Boudreau	Coach	
62nd	2017	Devan Dubnyk	Goaltender	
62nd	2017	Ryan Suter	Defense	
63rd	2018	Eric Staal	Center	
64th	2019	Devan Dubnyk	Goaltender	
65th	2020	Eric Staal	Center	
66th	2022	Kirill Kaprizov	Left wing	
66th	2022	Cam Talbot	Goaltender	
67th	2023	Kirill Kaprizov	Left wing	
68th	2024	Kirill Kaprizov	Left wing	

=== All-Star Game replacement events ===
Minnesota Wild players and coaches selected to All-Star Game replacement events
Event	Year	Name	Position	References
4 Nations Face-Off	2025	Matt Boldy (United States)	Left wing	
4 Nations Face-Off	2025	Jonas Brodin (Sweden)	Defense	
4 Nations Face-Off	2025	Joel Eriksson Ek (Sweden)	Center	
4 Nations Face-Off	2025	Brock Faber (United States)	Defense	
4 Nations Face-Off	2025	Filip Gustavsson (Sweden)	Goaltender	
4 Nations Face-Off	2025	John Hynes (United States)	Coach	

== Career achievements ==
=== Hockey Hall of Fame ===
The Minnesota Wild have not had any players or personnel who have been enshrined in the Hockey Hall of Fame. Jacques Lemaire, the team's head coach from 2000 to 2009, was inducted in the Players category in 1985.

=== Lester Patrick Trophy ===
The Lester Patrick Trophy has been presented by the National Hockey League and USA Hockey since 1966 to honor a recipient's contribution to ice hockey in the United States. This list includes all personnel who have ever been employed by the Minnesota Wild in any capacity and have also received the Lester Patrick Trophy.

Members of the Minnesota Wild honored with the Lester Patrick Trophy
Individual	Year honored	Years with Wild	References
Bob Naegele Jr.	2008	2000–2008	

=== Retired numbers ===
The Minnesota Wild have retired two of their jersey numbers. Prior to the Wild's first home opener on October 11, 2000, the team retired number 1 "in honor of the fans who helped bring back the NHL." On March 13, 2022, the Wild retired number 9 in honor of Mikko Koivu. Also out of circulation is the number 99 which was retired league-wide for Wayne Gretzky on February 6, 2000.

Minnesota Wild retired numbers
Number	Player	Position	Years with Wild as a player	Date of retirement ceremony	References
1	Wild Fans	—	—	October 11, 2000	
9	Mikko Koivu	Center	2005–2020	March 13, 2022	

== See also ==
- List of National Hockey League awards
