= List of Minnesota Wild players =

This is a complete list of ice hockey players who have played for the Minnesota Wild in the National Hockey League (NHL). It includes players that have played at least one regular season or playoff game for the Minnesota Wild since the franchise was established in 2000 as one of two expansion teams, along with the Columbus Blue Jackets.

As of May 5, 2023, 21 goaltenders and 280 skaters (forwards and defensemen) have appeared in at least one regular-season or playoff game with the Minnesota Wild since the team joined the League in the 2000–01 season.

The "Seasons" column lists the first year of the season of the player's first game and the last year of the season of the player's last game. For example, a player who played one game in the 2006–07 season would be listed as playing with the team from 2006 to 2007, regardless of what calendar year the game occurred within.

== Key ==
* Appeared in a Wild game during the 2024–2025 season.

Abbreviations
Nat	Nationality
GP	Games Played

Goaltenders
W	Wins	SO	Shutouts
L	Losses	GAA	Goals against average
T	Ties	SV%	Save percentage
OTL	Overtime loss		

Skaters
Pos	Position	RW	Right Wing	A	Assists
D	Defenseman	C	Centre	P	Points
LW	Left Wing	G	Goals	PIM	Penalty minutes

Note: Stats are updated through to the end of the 2024-2025 season

== Goaltenders ==
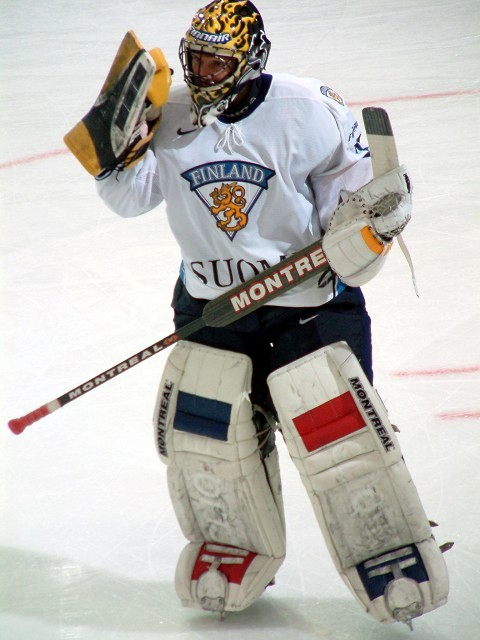
Niklas Backstrom playing for team Finland

Name	Nationality	Seasons	GP	W	L	T	OTL	SO	GAA	SV%	GP	W	L	SO	GAA	SV%	Notes
Name	Nationality	Seasons	Regular-season								Playoffs						Notes
Niklas Backstrom	Finland	2006–2016	398	194	142	—	50	28	2.75	.902	11	3	8	0	2.22	.924	William M. Jennings Trophy — 2006–2007
Zac Bierk	Canada	2000–2001	1	0	1	0	—	0	6.00	.788	—	—	—	—	—	—	
Ilya Bryzgalov	Russia	2013–2014	12	7	1	—	3	3	2.12	.911	9	3	6	1	2.78	.905	
John Curry	United States	2013–2016	4	1	0	—	1	0	3.59	.865	—	—	—	—	—	—	
Wade Dubielewicz	Canada	2009–2010	3	1	1	—	0	0	2.97	.853	—	—	—	—	—	—	
Devan Dubnyk	Canada	2014–2020	328	177	113	—	28	23	2.41	.918	26	8	18	2	2.72	.904	Bill Masterton Trophy — 2014—2015
Marc-Andre Fleury	Canada	2021–2025	123	64	42	—	10	5	2.90	.902	8	2	5	0	3.67	.858	
Manny Fernandez	Canada	2000–2007	260	113	102	20	1	12	2.47	.914	9	3	4	0	1.96	.929	William M. Jennings Trophy — 2006–2007
Derek Gustafson	United States	2000–2002	5	1	3	0	—	0	2.27	.904	—	—	—	—	—	—	
Filip Gustavsson*	Sweden	2022–2026	192	101	61	—	23	15	2.61	.911	12	4	7	0	2.67	.911	
Matt Hackett	Canada	2011–2013	13	3	7	—	0	0	2.64	.914	—	—	—	—	—	—	
Josh Harding	Canada	2005–2015	151	60	59	—	11	10	2.45	.918	6	1	4	0	2.72	.918	Bill Masterton Trophy — 2012—2013
Kaapo Kahkonen	Finland	2019–2022	54	31	17	—	4	2	2.88	.907	—	—	—	—	—	—	
Anton Khudobin	Russia	2009–2011	6	4	1	—	0	1	1.39	.955	—	—	—	—	—	—	
Dieter Kochan	Canada	2002–2003	1	0	1	0	—	0	5.00	.821	—	—	—	—	—	—	
Darcy Kuemper	Canada	2012–2017	102	41	34	—	14	7	2.60	.910	9	3	1	1	2.13	.911	
Jamie McLennan	Canada	2000–2001	38	5	23	9	—	2	2.64	.905	—	—	—	—	—	—	
Dwayne Roloson	Canada	2001–2006	167	62	71	26	—	15	2.28	.919	11	5	6	0	2.59	.903	
Alex Stalock	United States	2016–2020	89	37	30	—	11	5	2.77	.908	5	1	3	1	2.05	.929	
Cam Talbot	Canada	2020–2022	82	51	20	—	9	5	2.71	.913	8	3	5	1	2.66	.915	
Jose Theodore	Canada	2010–2011	32	15	11	—	3	1	2.71	.916	—	—	—	—	—	—	
Jesper Wallstedt*	Sweden	2023–2026	40	20	12	—	6	5	2.72	.910	10	5	5	0	2.77	.909	

== Skaters ==
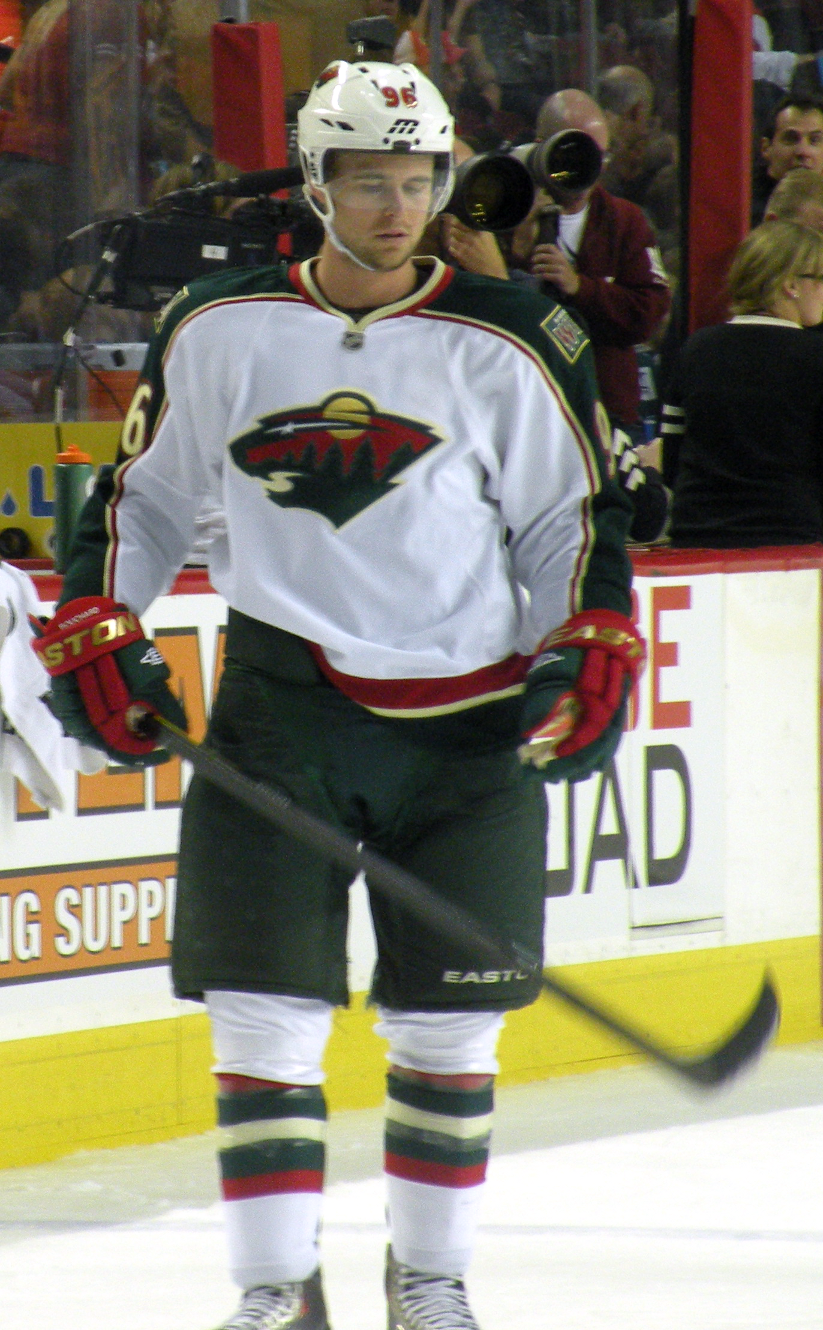
Pierre-Marc Bouchard spent his first 11 years in his NHL career with the Wild, joining the team in 2002.

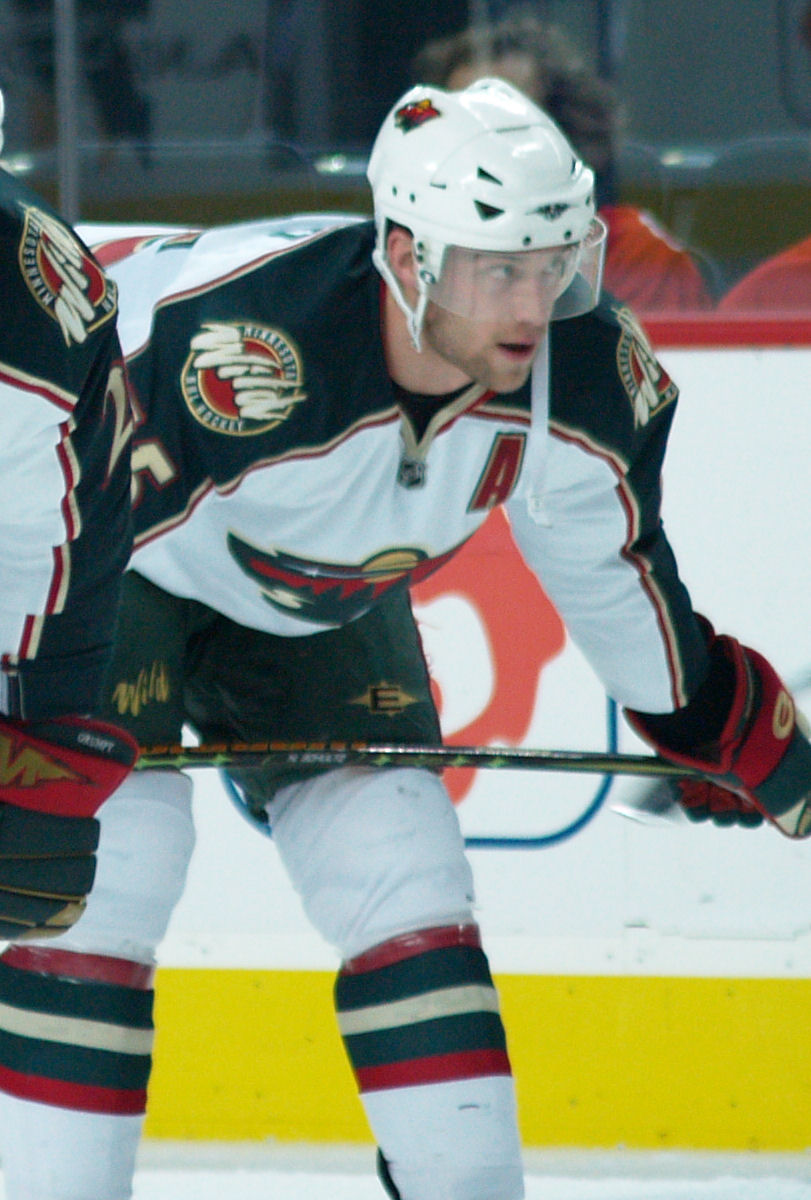
In seven seasons in Minnesota, Nick Schultz has scored 108 points.

Name	Nationality	Pos	Seasons	GP	G	A	P	PIM	GP	G	A	P	PIM	Notes
Name	Nationality	Pos	Seasons	Regular-season					Playoffs					Notes
Pontus Aberg	Sweden	LW	2018–2019	22	1	5	6	6	—	—	—	—	—	
Calen Addison	Canada	D	2020–2024	92	5	33	38	30	3	0	1	1	0	
Cody Almond	Canada	C	2009–2015	25	2	0	2	26	—	—	—	—	—	
Chris Armstrong	Canada	D	2000–2001	3	0	0	0	0	—	—	—	—	—	
Nicolas Aube-Kubel*	Canada	RW	2025–2026	6	0	2	2	6	—	—	—	—	—	
Drew Bagnall	Canada	D	2010–2011	2	0	0	0	4	—	—	—	—	—	
Keith Ballard	United States	D	2013–2015	59	2	8	10	63	3	0	0	0	0	
Cam Barker	Canada	D	2009–2011	71	2	10	12	44	—	—	—	—	—	
Matt Bartkowski	United States	D	2018–2021	3	1	0	1	0	1	0	0	0	0	
Peter Bartos	Slovakia	LW	2000–2001	13	4	2	6	6	—	—	—	—	—	
Adam Beckman	Canada	LW	2021–2024	23	0	3	3	14	—	—	—	—	—	
Eric Belanger	Canada	C	2007–2010	214	39	69	108	84	6	0	0	0	4	
Shawn Belle	Canada	D	2006–2007	9	0	1	1	0	—	—	—	—	—	
Louis Belpedio	United States	D	2017–2021	4	0	2	2	0	—	—	—	—	—	
Jordie Benn	Canada	D	2021–2022	39	1	7	8	10	—	—	—	—	—	
Christoph Bertschy	Switzerland	C	2015–2018	9	0	1	1	8	—	—	—	—	—	
Ladislav Benysek	Czech Republic	D	2000–2003	159	3	12	15	74	—	—	—	—	—	
Sean Bergenheim	Finland	LW	2014–2015	17	1	0	1	6	3	0	0	0	0	
Marc-Andre Bergeron	Canada	D	2008–2009	71	14	18	32	30	—	—	—	—	—	
Stu Bickel	United States	D	2014–2015	9	0	1	1	46	—	—	—	—	—	
Anthony Bitetto	United States	D	2018–2019	18	0	0	0	4	—	—	—	—	—	
Nick Bjugstad	United States	C	2020–2022	101	13	17	30	37	6	1	0	1	2	
Sylvain Blouin	Canada	LW	2000–2003	86	3	4	7	251	—	—	—	—	—	
Jonathon Blum	United States	D	2013–2015	19	0	2	2	22	—	—	—	—	—	
Zach Bogosian*	United States	D	2023–2026	183	9	27	36	124	15	0	1	1	4	
Matt Boldy*	United States	LW	2021–2026	361	144	185	329	178	29	13	11	24	14	
Brad Bombardir	Canada	D	2000–2004	212	3	33	36	93	4	0	0	0	0	Captain, 2000—2001
Brian Bonin	United States	C	2000–2001	7	0	0	0	0	—	—	—	—	—	
Nick Bonino	United States	C	2020–2021	55	10	16	26	26	7	0	0	0	0	
Derek Boogaard	Canada	LW	2005–2010	255	2	12	14	544	10	0	1	1	44	
Sebastien Bordeleau	Canada	C	2001–2002	14	1	4	5	8	—	—	—	—	—	
Pierre-Marc Bouchard	Canada	C	2002–2014	565	106	241	347	178	21	4	5	9	8	
Travis Boyd	United States	C	2024–2025	3	0	0	0	0	—	—	—	—	—	
Christoph Brandner	Austria	LW	2003–2004	35	4	5	9	8	—	—	—	—	—	
Justin Brazeau	Canada	F	2024–2025	19	1	1	2	2	6	0	2	2	0	
Bobby Brink*	United States	RW	2025–2026	13	2	2	4	4	4	0	1	1	4	
Jonas Brodin*	Sweden	D	2012–2026	915	62	216	278	278	78	2	16	18	22	
Kyle Brodziak	Canada	C	2009–2015	446	72	97	169	272	27	3	5	8	8	
Brad Brown	Canada	D	2001–2004	138	0	6	6	267	—	—	—	—	—	Captain, 2001–2002, 2003—2004
J. T. Brown	United States	RW	2018–2019	56	3	5	8	29	—	—	—	—	—	
Andrew Brunette	Canada	LW	2001–2004; 2008–2011	489	119	202	321	106	18	7	6	13	4	Captain, 2001–2002, 2003–2004, 2008—2009
Zeev Buium*	United States	D	2024–2026	31	3	11	14	8	4	0	1	1	4	
Brett Bulmer	Canada	RW	2011–2012; 2013–2014; 2015–2016	17	0	3	3	15	—	—	—	—	—	
Brent Burns	Canada	D	2003–2011	453	55	128	183	325	11	0	3	3	20	
Patrick Cannone	United States	C	2016–2017	3	0	0	0	0	—	—	—	—	—	
Ryan Carter	United States	C	2014–2016	113	10	15	25	103	3	0	0	0	10	
Keith Carney	United States	D	2006–2008	141	5	23	28	64	11	1	1	2	4	Captain, 2006—2007
Mitchell Chaffee	United States	F	2021–2022	2	0	0	0	0	—	—	—	—	—	
Declan Chisholm	Canada	D	2023–2025	95	5	15	20	28	—	—	—	—	—	
Eric Chouinard	Canada	C	2003–2004	31	3	4	7	6	—	—	—	—	—	
Marc Chouinard	Canada	C	2003–2006	119	25	26	51	51	—	—	—	—	—	
Erik Christensen	Canada	C	2011–2012	29	6	1	7	2	—	—	—	—	—	
Brett Clark	Canada	D	2012–2014	8	0	1	1	0	—	—	—	—	—	
Cal Clutterbuck	Canada	RW	2007–2013	346	62	48	110	337	5	1	1	2	4	
Ian Cole	United States	D	2020–2021	54	1	7	8	32	7	0	0	0	6	
Matt Cooke	Canada	LW	2013–2015	111	14	24	38	67	13	0	5	5	12	
Charlie Coyle	United States	C	2012–2019	479	91	151	242	186	44	7	8	15	18	
Joseph Cramarossa	Canada	C	2020–2023	9	1	2	3	21	—	—	—	—	—	
Cameron Crotty	Canada	D	2024–2025	1	0	0	0	0	—	—	—	—	—	
David Cullen	Canada	D	2001–2002	3	0	0	0	0	—	—	—	—	—	
Matt Cullen	United States	C	2010–2013; 2017–2018	272	44	79	123	88	10	1	4	5	4	
Tyler Cuma	Canada	D	2011–2012	1	0	0	0	2	—	—	—	—	—	
Alexandre Daigle	Canada	RW	2003–2006	124	25	54	79	26	—	—	—	—	—	
J. J. Daigneault	Canada	D	2000–2001	1	0	0	0	2	—	—	—	—	—	
Zac Dalpe	Canada	RW	2015–2017	11	2	2	4	9	3	0	0	0	0	
Pavol Demitra	Slovakia	RW	2006–2008	139	40	78	118	52	11	2	5	7	2	Captain, 2007—2008
Travis Dermott	Canada	D	2024–2025	9	0	0	0	0	—	—	—	—	—	
Nicolas Deslauriers	Canada	LW	2021–2022	20	3	0	3	23	5	0	0	0	0	
Connor Dewar	Canada	C	2021–2024	173	18	20	38	95	7	0	0	0	0	
Jon Disalvatore	United States	RW	2011–2012	1	0	0	0	2	—	—	—	—	—	
Hnat Domenichelli	Canada	RW	2001–2003	28	1	5	6	10	—	—	—	—	—	
Ryan Donato	United States	C	2018–2020	84	18	21	39	16	2	0	0	0	2	
Jim Dowd	United States	C	2000–2004	283	32	89	121	203	15	0	2	2	0	Captain, 2001–2002, 2003—2004
Jake Dowell	United States	C	2012–2014	3	0	0	0	0	—	—	—	—	—	
Brandon Duhaime	United States	RW	2021–2024	193	19	16	35	230	12	0	0	0	12	
Matt Dumba	Canada	D	2013–2023	598	79	157	236	399	49	5	10	15	39	
Gabriel Dumont	Canada	C	2019–2020	3	0	0	0	0	—	—	—	—	—	
Pascal Dupuis	Canada	RW	2000–2007	334	67	74	141	162	16	4	4	8	8	
Robbie Earl	United States	LW	2009–2011	38	6	0	6	6	—	—	—	—	—	
Andrew Ebbett	Canada	C	2009–2010	49	8	6	14	6	—	—	—	—	—	
Tyler Ennis	Canada	C	2017–2018	73	8	14	22	12	1	0	0	0	0	
Joel Eriksson Ek*	Sweden	C	2016–2026	614	155	195	350	274	38	9	9	18	22	
Robby Fabbri*	Canada	C	2025–2026	6	1	0	1	4	—	—	—	—	—	
Brock Faber*	United States	D	2022–2026	242	33	94	127	88	23	4	6	10	12	
Justin Falk	Canada	D	2009–2013; 2014–2015	121	1	14	15	107	4	0	0	0	2	
Todd Fedoruk	Canada	LW	2007–2008	58	6	5	11	106	6	1	1	2	16	
Eric Fehr	Canada	RW	2018–2019	72	7	8	15	30	—	—	—	—	—	
Scott Ferguson	Canada	D	2005–2006	15	0	0	0	22	—	—	—	—	—	
Landon Ferraro	Canada	C	2017–2018	2	1	0	1	0	—	—	—	—	—	
Kevin Fiala	Switzerland	LW	2018–2022	215	79	107	186	147	18	4	5	9	28	
Steven Fogarty	United States	C	2022–2023	2	0	0	0	0	—	—	—	—	—	
Marcus Foligno*	Canada	LW	2017–2026	584	99	121	220	616	45	7	7	14	84	
Nick Foligno*	United States	LW	2025–2026	17	1	3	4	17	11	2	1	3	6	
Christian Folin	Sweden	D	2013–2017	118	4	19	23	50	2	0	0	0	2	
Justin Fontaine	Canada	RW	2013–2016	197	27	41	68	58	19	2	2	4	4	
Kurtis Foster	Canada	D	2005–2009; 2011-2012	195	21	55	76	159	3	0	2	2	0	
Kris Foucault	United States	LW	2011–2012	1	0	0	0	0	—	—	—	—	—	
Matt Foy	Canada	RW	2005–2008	56	6	7	13	48	1	0	0	0	0	
Kris Fredheim	Canada	D	2011–2012	3	0	0	0	2	—	—	—	—	—	
Dan Fritsche	United States	C	2008–2009	34	4	5	9	10	—	—	—	—	—	
Marian Gaborik	Slovakia	RW	2000–2009	502	219	218	437	301	29	12	10	22	18	Captain, 2007—2008
Kurtis Gabriel	Canada	RW	2015–2017	16	0	1	1	39	4	0	0	0	0	
Alex Galchenyuk	United States	C	2019–2020	14	3	4	7	6	4	0	0	0	4	
Frederick Gaudreau	Canada	C	2021–2025	307	56	78	134	38	18	4	0	4	4	
Brendan Gaunce	Canada	C	2024–2025	12	0	1	1	4	—	—	—	—	—	
Aaron Gavey	Canada	C	2000–2002	146	16	25	41	90	—	—	—	—	—	
Chay Genoway	Canada	D	2011–2012	1	0	1	1	0	—	—	—	—	—	
Tom Gilbert	United States	D	2011–2013	63	3	15	18	26	5	0	0	0	2	
Colton Gillies	Canada	C	2008–2009; 2010-2012	89	3	7	10	30	—	—	—	—	—	
Damien Giroux	Canada	C	2022–2023	1	0	1	1	2	—	—	—	—	—	
Alex Goligoski	United States	D	2021–2024	154	4	42	46	68	4	0	0	0	2	
Mikael Granlund	Finland	C/RW	2012–2019	461	93	224	317	118	39	8	13	21	4	
Tyler Graovac	Canada	C	2014–2017	57	7	2	9	10	—	—	—	—	—	
Jordan Greenway	United States	LW	2017–2023	317	38	81	119	227	22	3	4	7	16	
Viking Gustafsson Nyberg*	Sweden	D	2025–2026	2	0	0	0	0	—	—	—	—	—	
Hunter Haight*	Canada	C	2025–2026	9	1	1	2	4	—	—	—	—	—	
Adam Hall	United States	RW	2006–2007	23	2	3	5	8	3	0	0	0	7	
Martin Hanzal	Czech Republic	C	2016–2017	20	4	9	13	10	5	1	0	1	0	
Ryan Hartman*	United States	RW	2019–2026	480	120	138	258	482	39	9	16	25	49	
Erik Haula	Finland	C	2013–2017	266	42	47	89	113	24	6	7	13	2	
Martin Havlat	Czech Republic	RW	2009–2011	151	40	76	116	86	—	—	—	—	—	
Dany Heatley	Canada	LW	2011–2014	118	47	55	102	54	11	1	5	6	4	
Matt Hendricks	United States	C	2018–2019	22	0	2	2	19	—	—	—	—	—	
Darby Hendrickson	United States	C	2000–2004	182	29	31	60	100	17	2	3	5	4	Captain, 2000—2001
Alex Henry	Canada	LW	2003–2006	134	2	9	11	179	—	—	—	—	—	Captain, 2005–2006
Andy Hilbert	United States	C	2009–2010	4	0	0	0	2	—	—	—	—	—	
Sean Hill	United States	D	2007–2008	35	2	7	9	32	5	0	0	0	4	
Vinnie Hinostroza*	United States	C	2024–2026	73	8	10	18	19	1	0	0	0	2	
Shane Hnidy	Canada	D	2009–2010	70	2	12	14	66	—	—	—	—	—	
Quinn Hughes*	United States	D	2025–2026	48	5	48	53	20	11	4	11	15	4	
Brad Hunt	Canada	D	2018–2021	100	12	13	25	16	4	0	0	0	2	
Daemon Hunt*	Canada	D	2023–2026	45	0	7	7	6	5	0	1	1	0	
Danny Irmen	United States	RW	2009–2010	2	0	0	0	0	—	—	—	—	—	
David Jiricek*	Czech Republic	D	2024–2026	31	1	1	2	16	—	—	—	—	—	
Marcus Johansson*	Sweden	F	2020–2021; 2022–2026	281	49	96	145	50	25	6	2	8	2	
Luke Johnson	United States	C	2019–2021	17	1	0	1	5	—	—	—	—	—	
Matt Johnson	Canada	LW	2000–2004	227	15	7	22	698	12	0	0	0	25	Captain, 2002—2003
Nick Johnson	Canada	RW	2011–2012	77	8	18	26	45	—	—	—	—	—	
Reese Johnson	Canada	F	2024–2025	3	0	0	0	0	—	—	—	—	—	
Kim Johnsson	Sweden	D	2006–2010	289	15	72	87	176	10	0	1	1	20	
Ben Jones*	Canada	F	2024–2026	54	1	2	3	10	—	—	—	—	—	
David Jones	Canada	RW	2015–2016	16	2	1	3	0	6	0	1	1	0	
Tyson Jost	Canada	C	2021–2023	33	2	7	9	15	6	0	0	0	4	
Petr Kalus	Czech Republic	RW	2009–2010	2	0	0	0	0	—	—	—	—	—	
Kirill Kaprizov*	Russia	LW	2020–2026	397	230	245	475	175	36	19	17	36	24	
Steven Kampfer	United States	D	2011–2012	13	2	1	3	2	—	—	—	—	—	
Matt Kassian	Canada	LW	2010–2012	28	2	0	2	67	—	—	—	—	—	
Steve Kelly	Canada	LW	2007–2008	2	0	0	0	0	—	—	—	—	—	
Michael Keranen	Finland	C	2015–2016	1	0	0	0	0	—	—	—	—	—	
Jujhar Khaira	Canada	LW	2023–2024	1	0	0	0	0	—	—	—	—	—	
Marat Khusnutdinov	Russia	C	2023–2025	73	3	8	11	20	—	—	—	—	—	
Matt Kiersted*	United States	D	2025–2026	6	0	1	1	0	—	—	—	—	—	
John Klingberg	Sweden	D	2022–2023	17	2	7	9	4	4	1	3	4	0	
Justin Kloos	United States	C	2017–2018	1	0	0	0	2	—	—	—	—	—	
Chuck Kobasew	Canada	RW	2009–2011	105	18	12	30	35	—	—	—	—	—	
Mikko Koivu	Finland	C	2005–2020	1028	205	504	709	592	59	11	17	28	38	Captain, 2008–2020 (first permanent captain in Wild history, 2009–2020)
Krys Kolanos	Canada	C	2008–2009	21	3	3	6	16	—	—	—	—	—	
Zenon Konopka	Canada	C	2012–2014	73	1	1	2	172	2	0	0	0	0	
Sergei Krivokrasov	Russia	RW	2000–2002	63	8	16	24	37	—	—	—	—	—	
Filip Kuba	Czech Republic	D	2000–2006	357	33	99	132	161	18	3	5	8	24	Captain, 2001–2002, 2005—2006
Dmitry Kulikov	Russia	D	2021–2022	80	7	17	24	39	2	0	1	1	2	
Luke Kunin	United States	C	2017–2020	131	23	29	52	95	4	2	0	2	2	
Antti Laaksonen	Finland	LW	2000–2004	323	55	63	118	92	16	1	3	4	4	
Carson Lambos*	Canada	D	2025–2026	1	0	0	0	0	—	—	—	—	—	
Johan Larsson	Sweden	RW	2012–2013	1	0	0	0	0	—	—	—	—	—	
Guillaume Latendresse	Canada	RW	2009–2012	82	33	19	52	40	—	—	—	—	—	
Jakub Lauko	Czech Republic	C	2024–2025	38	3	3	6	27	—	—	—	—	—	
Jordan Leopold	United States	D	2014–2015	18	0	1	1	8	9	0	0	0	0	
Curtis Leschyshyn	Canada	D	2000–2001	54	2	3	5	19	—	—	—	—	—	
Vinni Lettieri	Canada	C	2023–2024	46	5	4	9	24	—	—	—	—	—	
Jon Lizotte	United States	D	2021–2022	1	0	0	0	2	—	—	—	—	—	
Jake Lucchini	Canada	F	2023–2024	40	2	3	5	23	—	—	—	—	—	
Mike Lundin	United States	D	2011–2012	17	0	2	2	4	—	—	—	—	—	
John Madden	Canada	C	2010–2011	76	12	13	25	10	—	—	—	—	—	
Patrick Maroon	United States	LW	2023–2024	49	4	12	16	60	—	—	—	—	—	
Jason Marshall	Canada	D	2001–2004	137	7	15	22	235	15	1	1	2	16	
Christian Matte	Canada	RW	2000–2001	3	0	0	0	2	—	—	—	—	—	
Mike Matteucci	Canada	D	2000–2002	6	0	0	0	4	—	—	—	—	—	
Gerald Mayhew	United States	F	2019–2021	17	2	1	3	2	—	—	—	—	—	
Michael McCarron*	United States	RW	2025–2026	20	3	2	5	20	11	2	2	4	0	
Cody McCormick	Canada	C/RW	2013–2014	14	1	1	2	7	13	1	0	1	16	
David McIntyre	Canada	C	2011–2012	7	1	1	2	2	—	—	—	—	—	
Steve McKenna	Canada	LW	2000–2001	20	1	1	2	19	—	—	—	—	—	
Carson McMillan	Canada	RW	2011–2015	16	2	3	5	11	—	—	—	—	—	
Brennan Menell	United States	D	2019–2020	5	0	0	0	2	—	—	—	—	—	
Dakota Mermis	United States	D	2020–2024	54	3	5	8	33	—	—	—	—	—	
Jon Merrill	United States	D	2021–2025	277	12	37	49	110	10	0	1	1	2	
Zbynek Michalek	Czech Republic	D	2003–2004	22	1	1	2	4	—	—	—	—	—	
Jacob Middleton*	Canada	D	2021–2026	322	21	61	82	278	29	0	6	6	14	
Antti Miettinen	Finland	RW	2008–2011	234	51	70	121	114	—	—	—	—	—	
Michael Milne	Canada	LW	2024–2025	1	0	0	0	0	—	—	—	—	—	
Torrey Mitchell	Canada	C	2012–2014	103	5	12	17	42	5	1	0	1	0	
Willie Mitchell	Canada	D	2000–2006	288	9	48	57	233	18	1	3	4	14	Captain, 2006—2006
Zack Mitchell	Canada	RW	2016–2018	34	3	2	5	4	—	—	—	—	—	
Tomas Mojzis	Czech Republic	D	2008–2009	4	0	1	1	2	—	—	—	—	—	
Dominic Moore	Canada	C	2006–2008	40	3	2	5	20	—	—	—	—	—	
Jason Morgan	Canada	C	2006–2007	4	0	0	0	4	—	—	—	—	—	
Matt Moulson	Canada	LW	2013–2014	20	6	7	13	8	10	1	2	3	4	
Bill Muckalt	Canada	RW	2002–2003	8	5	3	8	6	5	0	0	0	0	
Curtis Murphy	Canada	D	2002–2003	1	0	0	0	0	—	—	—	—	—	
Ryan Murphy	Canada	D	2017–2019	23	2	3	5	16	1	0	0	0	0	
Andrei Nazarov	Russia	LW	2005–2006	2	0	0	0	6	—	—	—	—	—	
Nino Niederreiter	Switzerland	RW	2013–2019	434	110	118	228	207	39	8	10	18	24	
Jeff Nielsen	United States	RW	2000–2001	59	3	8	11	4	—	—	—	—	—	
Owen Nolan	Canada	LW	2008–2010	132	41	37	78	66	—	—	—	—	—	
Maxim Noreau	Canada	D	2009–2011	6	0	0	0	0	—	—	—	—	—	
Petteri Nummelin	Finland	D	2006–2008	78	5	24	29	24	7	1	2	3	0	
Kai Nurminen	Finland	LW	2000–2001	2	1	0	1	2	—	—	—	—	—	
Gustav Nyquist	Sweden	RW	2022–2023; 2024–2025	25	3	9	12	4	12	0	5	5	2	
Eric Nystrom	United States	LW	2010–2011	82	4	8	12	30	—	—	—	—	—	
Sean O'Donnell	Canada	D	2000–2001	63	4	12	16	128	—	—	—	—	—	Captain, 2000—2001
Cal O'Reilly	Canada	C	2017–2018	1	0	0	0	0	—	—	—	—	—	
Patrick O'Sullivan	Canada	C	2010–2011	21	1	6	7	2	—	—	—	—	—	
Liam Öhgren*	Sweden	LW	2023–2026	46	3	4	7	2	—	—	—	—	—	
Gustav Olofsson	Sweden	D	2015–2018	56	0	11	11	16	—	—	—	—	—	
Peter Olvecky	Slovakia	C	2008–2009	31	2	5	7	12	—	—	—	—	—	
Jed Ortmeyer	United States	RW	2011–2012	39	1	1	2	16	—	—	—	—	—	
Jarod Palmer	United States	C	2011–2012	6	1	0	1	4	—	—	—	—	—	
Nick Palmieri	United States	RW	2011–2012	9	0	0	0	2	—	—	—	—	—	
Zach Parise	United States	LW	2012–2021	558	199	201	400	207	44	16	21	37	24	
Richard Park	South Korea	RW	2001–2004	217	37	37	74	54	18	3	3	6	4	Captain, 2003—2004
Mark Parrish	United States	RW	2006–2008	142	35	34	69	34	6	1	0	1	0	Captain, 2006—2008
Pavel Patera	Czech Republic	LW	2000–2001	20	1	3	4	4	—	—	—	—	—	
Greg Pateryn	United States	D	2018–2021	103	1	11	12	47	—	—	—	—	—	
Scott Pellerin	Canada	LW	2000–2001	58	11	28	39	45	—	—	—	—	—	Captain, 2000—2001
Nic Petan	United States	C	2022–2024	16	1	4	5	4	—	—	—	—	—	
Warren Peters	Canada	C	2010–2012	69	2	4	6	58	—	—	—	—	—	
Jeff Petry*	United States	D	2025–2026	9	0	1	1	2	3	0	0	0	0	
Rem Pitlick	Canada	C	2021–2022	20	6	5	11	12	—	—	—	—	—	
Tyler Pitlick*	United States	C	2025–2026	32	2	0	2	24	—	—	—	—	—	
Jason Pominville	United States	RW	2012–2017	327	76	130	206	40	36	9	14	23	6	
Chris Porter	Canada	C	2015–2016	61	4	3	7	6	6	1	0	1	0	
Benoit Pouliot	Canada	LW	2006–2010	65	9	9	18	30	1	0	0	0	0	
Darroll Powe	Canada	C	2011–2013	90	6	7	13	66	—	—	—	—	—	
Nate Prosser	United States	D	2009–2019	353	10	37	47	231	25	0	3	3	30	
Teemu Pulkkinen	Finland	RW	2016–2017	9	1	0	1	2	—	—	—	—	—	
Kyle Quincey	Canada	D	2017–2018	18	0	3	3	28	—	—	—	—	—	
Branko Radivojevic	Slovakia	RW	2006–2008	155	18	23	41	69	7	0	0	0	2	
Victor Rask	Sweden	C	2018–2022	149	22	30	52	14	7	0	0	0	0	
Adam Raška	Czech Republic	RW	2023–2024	5	0	0	0	0	—	—	—	—	—	
Chad Rau	United States	C	2011–2012	9	2	0	2	0	—	—	—	—	—	
Kyle Rau	United States	C	2017–2022	28	0	4	4	9	2	0	0	0	0	
Matt Read	Canada	RW	2018–2019	12	1	0	1	2	—	—	—	—	—	
Ryan Reaves	Canada	RW	2022–2023	61	5	10	15	31	6	0	0	0	14	
Mike Reilly	United States	D	2015–2018	84	4	14	18	28	—	—	—	—	—	
Eric Reitz	United States	D	2005–2007; 2008–2009	37	1	1	2	45	2	0	0	0	2	
Randy Robitaille	Canada	C	2005–2006	67	12	28	40	54	—	—	—	—	—	
Travis Roche	Canada	D	2000–2002; 2003–2004	10	0	1	1	2	—	—	—	—	—	
Stacy Roest	Canada	C	2000–2002	134	17	31	48	28	—	—	—	—	—	
Brian Rolston	United States	RW	2005–2008	241	96	106	202	149	11	3	5	8	12	Captain, 2005—2008
Cliff Ronning	Canada	C	2002–2003	80	17	31	48	24	17	2	7	9	4	
Marco Rossi*	Austria	C	2021–2026	202	49	65	114	87	6	2	1	3	6	
Mike Rupp	United States	LW	2012–2014	45	1	4	5	80	4	0	0	0	12	
Marco Scandella	Canada	D	2010–2017	373	27	62	89	148	39	6	3	9	6	
Jordan Schroeder	United States	C	2014–2017	88	11	14	25	4	5	1	0	1	0	
Nick Schultz	Canada	D	2001–2012	743	26	102	128	332	24	0	2	2	10	Captain, 2007—2008
John Scott	Canada	RW	2008–2010	71	1	2	3	111	—	—	—	—	—	
Nick Seeler	United States	D	2017–2020	99	2	9	11	93	5	0	2	2	7	
Lubomir Sekeras	Slovakia	D	2000–2003	209	17	52	69	120	15	1	1	2	6	
Devin Setoguchi	Canada	RW	2011–2013	117	32	31	63	48	5	1	0	1	0	
Mason Shaw	Canada	C	2021–2024	82	8	12	20	118	—	—	—	—	—	
James Sheppard	Canada	C	2007–2010	224	11	38	49	108	6	0	1	1	4	
Devin Shore	Canada	C	2024–2025	55	1	4	5	6	—	—	—	—	—	
Jaime Sifers	United States	D	2009–2010	14	0	0	0	6	—	—	—	—	—	
Roman Simicek	Czech Republic	C	2000–2002	34	4	4	8	29	—	—	—	—	—	
Chris Simon	Canada	LW	2009–2010	10	0	0	0	16	2	0	0	0	0	
Martin Skoula	Czech Republic	D	2005–2009	259	8	40	48	82	11	0	0	0	4	
Nathan Smith	Canada	C	2006–2007	9	0	0	0	12	—	—	—	—	—	
Wyatt Smith	United States	C	2006–2007	61	3	3	6	16	4	0	0	0	0	
Carson Soucy	Canada	D	2017–2021	108	8	23	31	71	12	0	0	0	2	
David Spacek*	Czech Republic	D	2025–2026	2	0	0	0	0	—	—	—	—	—	
Jared Spurgeon*	Canada	D	2010–2026	1012	123	315	438	174	84	9	22	31	28	
Eric Staal	Canada	C	2016–2020	311	111	129	240	138	14	2	6	8	4	
Brad Staubitz	Canada	RW	2010–2012	114	4	5	9	246	—	—	—	—	—	
Sam Steel	Canada	C	2022–2023	65	10	18	28	18	5	1	1	2	2	
Jeremy Stevenson	United States	LW	2002–2004	35	5	6	11	71	14	0	5	5	12	
Cam Stewart	Canada	LW	2000–2001	54	4	9	13	18	—	—	—	—	—	
Chris Stewart	Canada	RW	2014–2015; 2016–2018	146	25	20	45	146	13	0	2	2	2	
Jarret Stoll	Canada	C	2015–2016	51	3	3	6	16	4	0	0	0	4	
Clayton Stoner	Canada	D	2009–2014	227	4	27	31	296	14	1	3	4	26	
Tyson Strachan	Canada	D	2015–2016	2	0	0	0	0	—	—	—	—	—	
Nico Sturm*	Germany	C	2018–2022; 2025–2026	160	25	22	47	41	17	3	5	8	0	
Oskar Sundqvist	Sweden	C	2022–2023	15	3	4	7	8	1	1	0	1	2	
Maxim Sushinski	Russia	RW	2000–2001	30	7	4	11	29	—	—	—	—	—	
Ryan Suter	United States	D	2012–2021	656	55	314	369	271	49	2	16	18	22	
Brett Sutter	Canada	C	2014–2015	6	0	3	3	4	—	—	—	—	—	
Andy Sutton	Canada	D	2000–2002	88	5	8	13	166	—	—	—	—	—	
Nick Swaney	United States	RW	2022–2023	1	0	0	0	0	—	—	—	—	—	
Petr Sykora	Czech Republic	C	2009–2010	14	2	1	3	8	—	—	—	—	—	
Jeff Taffe	United States	LW	2011–2012	5	0	2	2	0	—	—	—	—	—	
Vladimir Tarasenko*	Russia	RW	2025–2026	75	23	24	47	10	11	2	3	5	2	
Daniel Tjarnqvist	Sweden	D	2005–2006	60	3	15	18	32	—	—	—	—	—	
Yakov Trenin*	Russia	C	2024–2026	158	13	25	38	92	15	0	4	4	6	
Jean-Guy Trudel	Canada	LW	2002–2003	1	0	0	0	2	—	—	—	—	—	
Alex Tuch	United States	RW	2016–2017	6	0	0	0	0	—	—	—	—	—	
Thomas Vanek	Austria	LW	2014–2016	154	39	54	93	59	10	0	4	4	2	
Stephane Veilleux	Canada	LW	2002–2009; 2011–2016	428	47	50	97	300	17	0	0	0	35	
Tony Virta	Finland	RW	2001–2002	8	2	3	5	0	—	—	—	—	—	
Aaron Voros	Canada	LW	2007–2008	55	7	7	14	141	5	1	0	1	16	
Sammy Walker	United States	C	2022–2024	13	1	1	2	0	—	—	—	—	—	
Rickard Wallin	Sweden	C	2002–2004	19	6	4	10	14	—	—	—	—	—	
Wes Walz	Canada	C	2000–2008	447	81	87	168	266	23	7	7	14	18	Captan, 2000–2001, 2005—2006
Kyle Wanvig	Canada	RW	2002–2006	64	5	9	14	87	—	—	—	—	—	
Joel Ward	Canada	RW	2006–2007	11	0	1	1	0	—	—	—	—	—	
Mattias Weinhandl	Sweden	RW	2005–2007	27	3	4	7	20	—	—	—	—	—	
Craig Weller	Canada	RW	2008–2009	36	1	2	3	47	—	—	—	—	—	
Casey Wellman	Canada	C	2009–2012	41	4	9	13	4	—	—	—	—	—	
Erik Westrum	United States	C	2005–2006	10	0	1	1	2	—	—	—	—	—	
Ryan White	Canada	C	2016–2017	19	2	1	3	14	3	0	0	0	4	
Todd White	Canada	C	2005–2007	138	32	52	84	42	4	0	0	0	0	
Jason Wiemer	Canada	C	2003–2004	62	7	11	18	106	—	—	—	—	—	
Daniel Winnik	Canada	C	2017–2018	81	6	17	23	27	5	0	1	1	5	
Danila Yurov*	Russia	RW	2025–2026	73	12	15	27	28	9	1	2	3	8	
Greg Zanon	Canada	D	2009–2012	202	4	24	28	98	—	—	—	—	—	
Sergei Zholtok	Latvia	C	2001–2004	210	48	62	110	65	18	2	11	13	0	Captain, 2002–2003
Marek Zidlicky	Czech Republic	D	2008–2012	241	25	98	123	197	—	—	—	—	—	
Mats Zuccarello*	Norway	LW	2019–2026	452	118	271	389	148	37	6	19	25	10	
Jason Zucker	United States	LW	2011–2020	456	132	111	243	171	31	4	4	8	6	
Andrei Zyuzin	Russia	D	2002–2006	188	19	36	55	132	18	0	1	1	14	
