= Ryan Suter =

American ice hockey player (born 1985)

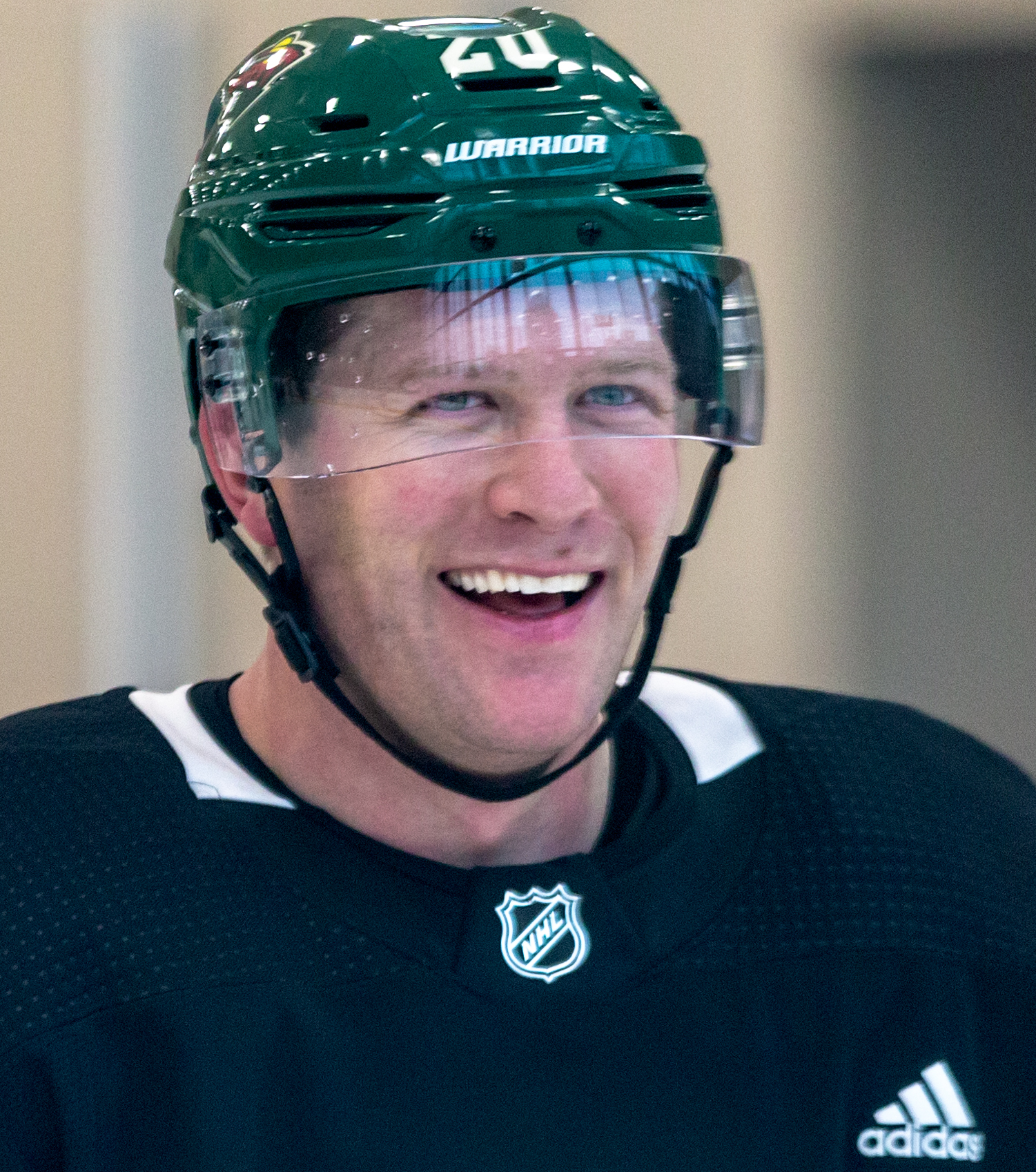
- Suter with the Minnesota Wild in 2019
- Born: January 21, 1985 (age 41) Madison, Wisconsin, U.S.
- Height: 6 ft 1 in (185 cm)
- Weight: 206 lb (93 kg; 14 st 10 lb)
- Position: Defense
- Shoots: Left
- NHL team Former teams: Free agent Nashville Predators; Minnesota Wild; Dallas Stars; St. Louis Blues
- National team: United States
- NHL draft: 7th overall, 2003; Nashville Predators
- Playing career: 2004–present

Ryan Suter (born January 21, 1985) is an American professional ice hockey player who is a defenseman. He most recently played for the St. Louis Blues of the National Hockey League (NHL). He has previously played for the Nashville Predators, Minnesota Wild, and Dallas Stars. Internationally, Suter has represented the United States national team at the 2010 Winter Olympics. He is also the owner of the Madison Capitols of the United States Hockey League (USHL).

Suter was born into an athletic family as his father, Bob Suter, was a member of the United States team that won gold medals in the 1980 Winter Olympics after defeating the Soviet Union in the famous "Miracle on Ice" game. Suter's uncle, Gary Suter, was a longtime player in the NHL.

== Early life ==
Suter was born on January 21, 1985, in Madison, Wisconsin, U.S. to parents Bob and Diane. He grew up in Wisconsin alongside his younger brother Garrett while their father coached at the University of Wisconsin and their mother worked as an ice hockey administrator. Suter was born into an athletic family as his father was a member of the United States men's national ice hockey team at the 1980 Winter Olympic Games and his uncle Gary Suter was a professional ice hockey player in the National Hockey League (NHL).

== Playing career ==
=== Amateur ===
Growing up, Suter played for the Madison Capitols and Culver Military Academy before joining the USA Hockey's National Development Team in Ann Arbor, Michigan. Following a change to the NCAA legislature, Suter was able to enroll and play at the University of Wisconsin–Madison (UW) while remaining eligible for the 2003 NHL entry draft. He was eventually drafted seventh overall by the Nashville Predators in the NHL entry draft. Prior to returning to the Badgers, Suter participated in the Predators conditioning camp ahead of the 2003–04 season. As he signed a contract with the Badgers, Suter was required to pay for his own room and board while attending the camp. Upon rejoining the Badgers, Suter was selected as the Western Collegiate Hockey Association (WCHA) preseason Rookie of the Year. Although Suter began the season with one goal through six games, he was given an increase in defensive responsibilities on the Badger's rookie-dominated, power-play unit. Suter finished his rookie season with a selection for the All-WCHA Rookie Team and All-WCHA Third Team. While Suter re-enrolled at UW for his sophomore season, he signed a professional contract with the Predators on September 7. Due to the suddenness and inconvenience of the signing, as the season had already started, Predators general manager David Poile called the Badgers head coach to apologize.

=== Nashville Predators (2005–2012) ===
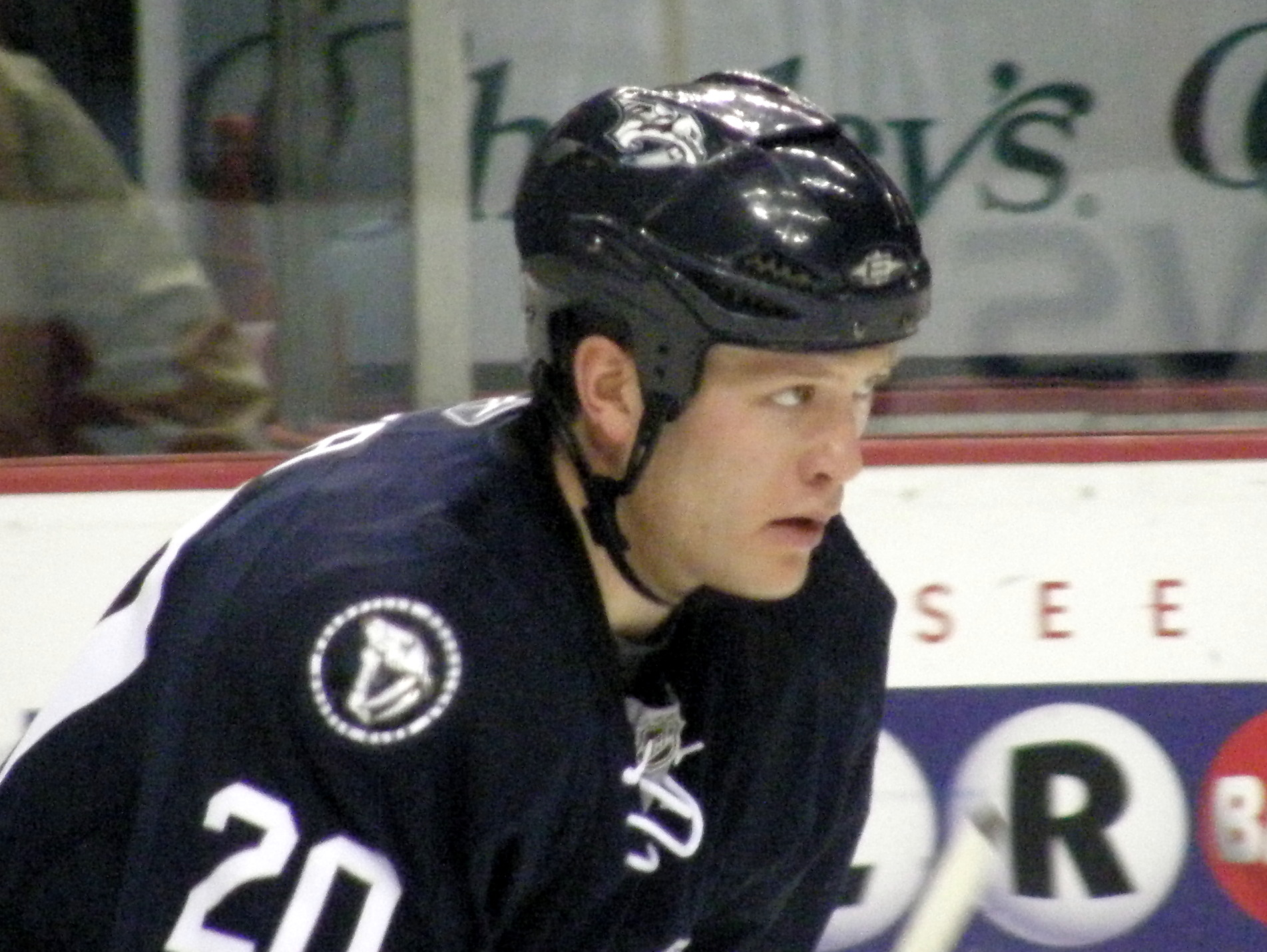
Suter with the Nashville Predators in February 2010.

After playing one season with the Wisconsin Badgers, Suter joined the Milwaukee Admirals of the American Hockey League (AHL) for the 2004–05 season due to the NHL lockout. In his only season with the Admirals, Suter tallied seven goals and 23 points to help the Admirals to 49 wins. Following his rookie season, Suter spent three days at the U.S. Olympic orientation camp before joining the Predators for their training camp. He subsequently made his NHL debut, and tallied his first NHL assist, on October 6, 2005, against the San Jose Sharks. Suter later scored his first career NHL goal on December 21, against the Chicago Blackhawks, becoming one of the youngest defenceman to score his first goal in NHL history. As the Predators made a push for the 2006 Stanley Cup playoffs, the team traded a first-round draft pick for veteran defenseman Brendan Witt. As such, Suter was limited to 71 games and 16 points during the regular season and saw no ice time during the playoffs.

Suter returned to the Predators for the 2006–07 season, where he improved significantly from his rookie season. He tallied eight goals and improved to 24 points while skating an average of 20:09 minutes per game. As the Predators qualified for the 2007 Stanley Cup playoffs, Suter appeared in all five playoff contests against the Sharks. He tallied his first career playoff goal in the Predators Game 3 loss on April 16, 2007. This would prove to be his only point as the Predators fell to the Sharks in five games.

On June 16, 2008, Suter signed a four-year, $14 million contract extension with the Predators which commenced for the 2008–09 NHL season.

=== Minnesota Wild (2012–2021) ===
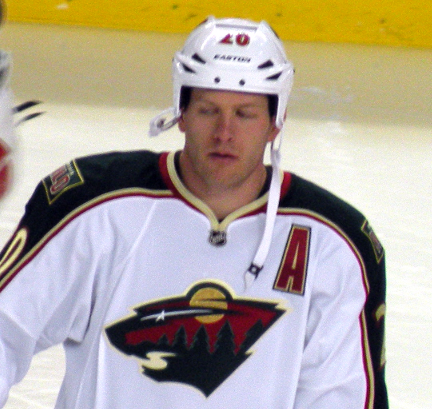
Suter with the Wild in February 2013.

On July 4, 2012, Suter signed a 13-year, $98 million contract with the Minnesota Wild. He and fellow free agent signee Zach Parise were introduced to the media on July 10 and were announced as alternate captains under captain Mikko Koivu. Suter got off to a rough start with a –7 plus-minus rating in his first nine games. However, once he began pairing with rookie defenseman Jonas Brodin, Suter began playing to expectations and was among three finalists for the James Norris Memorial Trophy, awarded yearly to the NHL's top defenseman. For the season, Suter averaged an NHL-leading 27:17 minutes of ice time as Minnesota reached the playoffs, where the team fell to the Chicago Blackhawks in the first round.

Suter scored his first NHL hat-trick on January 4, 2014, against the Washington Capitals; his first two goals came on the power play 38 seconds apart in the second period, and in the third period, right after his penalty expired, Suter scored his third goal on a two-on-one with defenseman Clayton Stoner. This goal sealed what would eventually be a 5–3 victory for the Wild.

During the 2015–16 season, Suter set a franchise record for the Minnesota Wild with the most points by a defenseman in a single season. With 43 assists and 51 points, he also set a personal best in both categories. Throughout his tenure with the Wild, he has continuously been relied upon to play a large number of minutes including on the power play and on the penalty kill.

On October 19, 2018, in a 3–1 win against the Dallas Stars, Suter recorded his 500th NHL point, becoming the 11th American-born defensemen to reach the milestone. Later that month, on October 25, Suter played in his 1,000th NHL game, becoming the 109th defenseman to reach the milestone.

On July 13, 2021, the Wild bought out the remaining four years of Suter's contract.

=== Dallas Stars (2021–2024) ===
On July 28, 2021, the opening day of free agency, Suter agreed to sign a four-year, $14.6 million contract to join the Dallas Stars.

Following the conclusion of the 2023–24 season, Suter was bought out of the final year of his contract for the second time in his career, becoming the second player in NHL history to be bought out twice (the other player being Tony DeAngelo).

=== St. Louis Blues (2024–2025) ===
On July 10, 2024, Suter signed a one-year, $3 million contract with the St. Louis Blues for the 2024–25 season. As a fixture on the Blues defense, Suter primarily played in a third-pairing role. He played his 1,500th NHL game on February 8, 2025, becoming only the 22nd player to reach the milestone, and the third American-born player to do so. He appeared in every regular season game with the Blues, posting 2 goals and 15 points in 82 appearances.

== International play ==
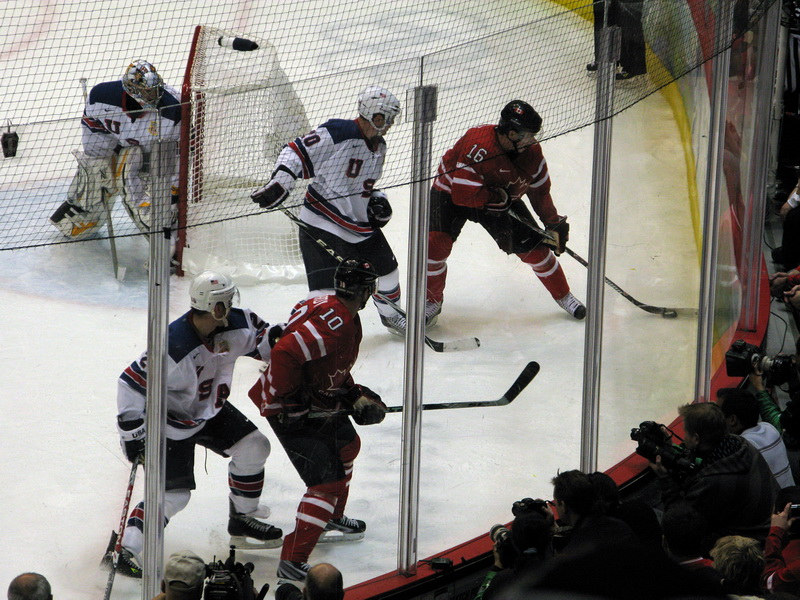
- Canada's Jonathan Toews guards the puck from Suter during the 2010 Winter Olympics

Medal record

Men's ice hockey

Representing the United States

Winter Olympics
Silver medal – second place	2010 Vancouver	

World Junior Championships
Gold medal – first place	2004 Helsinki	

World U18 Championships
Gold medal – first place	2002 Trnava	

World U-17 Hockey Challenge
Gold medal – first place	2002 Manitoba	

Suter has represented the United States in 11 tournaments, and has won three gold medals.

I feel it's an honor to wear the Team USA Jersey and every time I'm on the ice I play my hardest and give everything I have. Playing for Team USA is one of those things you look forward to. When I got the call and was asked to play on this team, it was an easy answer. It didn't matter who was on the team or who the coach was. It's just an honor to wear the jersey and compete for your country."

On January 1, 2010, Suter was named to the United States' roster for the 2010 Winter Olympics. He was one of the team's alternate captains.

In 2016, he was also selected to represent the United States at the 2016 World Cup of Hockey alongside Wild's teammate, Zach Parise.

On April 19, 2019, Suter returned to the international stage for the first time in three years as he accepted an invitation to represent the United States at the 2019 World Championship.

In 2020, Suter was named to the IIHF All-Time USA Team.

== Personal life ==
Suter resides in Madison, Wisconsin, during the NHL off-season. He is married to Becky Suter (née Palmer), who is from Bloomington, Minnesota. The couple have four children together.

== Career statistics ==
=== Regular season and playoffs ===
			Regular season					Playoffs
Season	Team	League	GP	G	A	Pts	PIM	GP	G	A	Pts	PIM
2000–01	Culver Military Academy	HS-Prep	26	13	32	45	38	—	—	—	—	—
2001–02	U.S. NTDP U17	USDP	8	2	11	13	21	—	—	—	—	—
2001–02	U.S. NTDP U18	USDP	27	4	10	14	6	—	—	—	—	—
2001–02	U.S. NTDP U18	NAHL	35	2	10	12	75	—	—	—	—	—
2002–03	U.S. NTDP U18	USDP	42	7	17	24	124	—	—	—	—	—
2002–03	U.S. NTDP U18	NAHL	9	2	5	7	12	—	—	—	—	—
2003–04	Wisconsin Badgers	WCHA	39	3	16	19	93	—	—	—	—	—
2004–05	Milwaukee Admirals	AHL	63	7	16	23	70	7	1	5	6	16
2005–06	Nashville Predators	NHL	71	1	15	16	66	—	—	—	—	—
2006–07	Nashville Predators	NHL	82	8	16	24	54	5	1	0	1	8
2007–08	Nashville Predators	NHL	76	7	24	31	71	6	1	1	2	4
2008–09	Nashville Predators	NHL	82	7	38	45	73	—	—	—	—	—
2009–10	Nashville Predators	NHL	82	4	33	37	48	6	0	0	0	0
2010–11	Nashville Predators	NHL	70	4	35	39	54	12	1	5	6	6
2011–12	Nashville Predators	NHL	79	7	39	46	30	10	1	3	4	4
2012–13	Minnesota Wild	NHL	48	4	28	32	28	5	0	0	0	4
2013–14	Minnesota Wild	NHL	82	8	35	43	34	13	1	6	7	4
2014–15	Minnesota Wild	NHL	77	2	36	38	48	10	0	3	3	0
2015–16	Minnesota Wild	NHL	82	8	43	51	30	6	0	3	3	4
2016–17	Minnesota Wild	NHL	82	9	31	40	36	5	1	2	3	10
2017–18	Minnesota Wild	NHL	78	6	45	51	34	—	—	—	—	—
2018–19	Minnesota Wild	NHL	82	7	40	47	41	—	—	—	—	—
2019–20	Minnesota Wild	NHL	69	8	40	48	12	3	0	1	1	0
2020–21	Minnesota Wild	NHL	56	3	16	19	12	7	0	1	1	0
2021–22	Dallas Stars	NHL	82	7	25	32	40	7	0	3	3	2
2022–23	Dallas Stars	NHL	82	3	22	25	26	19	0	6	6	18
2023–24	Dallas Stars	NHL	82	2	15	17	28	19	1	3	4	16
2024–25	St. Louis Blues	NHL	82	2	13	15	24	5	0	1	1	0
NHL totals			1,526	107	589	696	785	138	7	38	45	80

=== International ===
Year	Team	Event	Result	GP	G	A	Pts	PIM
2002	United States	U17	1st place, gold medalist(s)	7	2	3	5	4
2002	United States	WJC18	1st place, gold medalist(s)	8	1	6	7	12
2003	United States	WJC	4th	7	2	1	3	2
2003	United States	WJC18	4th	6	1	3	4	22
2004	United States	WJC	1st place, gold medalist(s)	6	0	2	2	8
2005	United States	WJC	4th	7	1	7	8	20
2005	United States	WC	6th	1	0	0	0	0
2006	United States	WC	7th	7	1	1	2	10
2007	United States	WC	5th	7	1	2	3	12
2009	United States	WC	4th	9	1	2	3	8
2010	United States	OG	2nd place, silver medalist(s)	6	0	4	4	2
2014	United States	OG	4th	6	0	3	3	4
2016	United States	WCH	7th	3	0	1	1	0
2019	United States	WC	7th	8	0	5	5	4
Junior totals				41	7	22	29	68
Senior totals				47	3	18	21	40

== Awards and honors ==
Award	Year
College
All-WCHA Rookie Team	2004
All-WCHA Third Team	2004
NHL
All-Star Game	2012, 2015, 2017
First All-Star team	2013
International
IIHF All-Time USA Team	2020

== See also ==
- Notable families in the NHL

Awards and achievements
Preceded by Scottie Upshall	Nashville Predators first-round draft pick 2003	Succeeded by Alexander Radulov
