= Jared Spurgeon =

Canadian ice hockey player (born 1989)

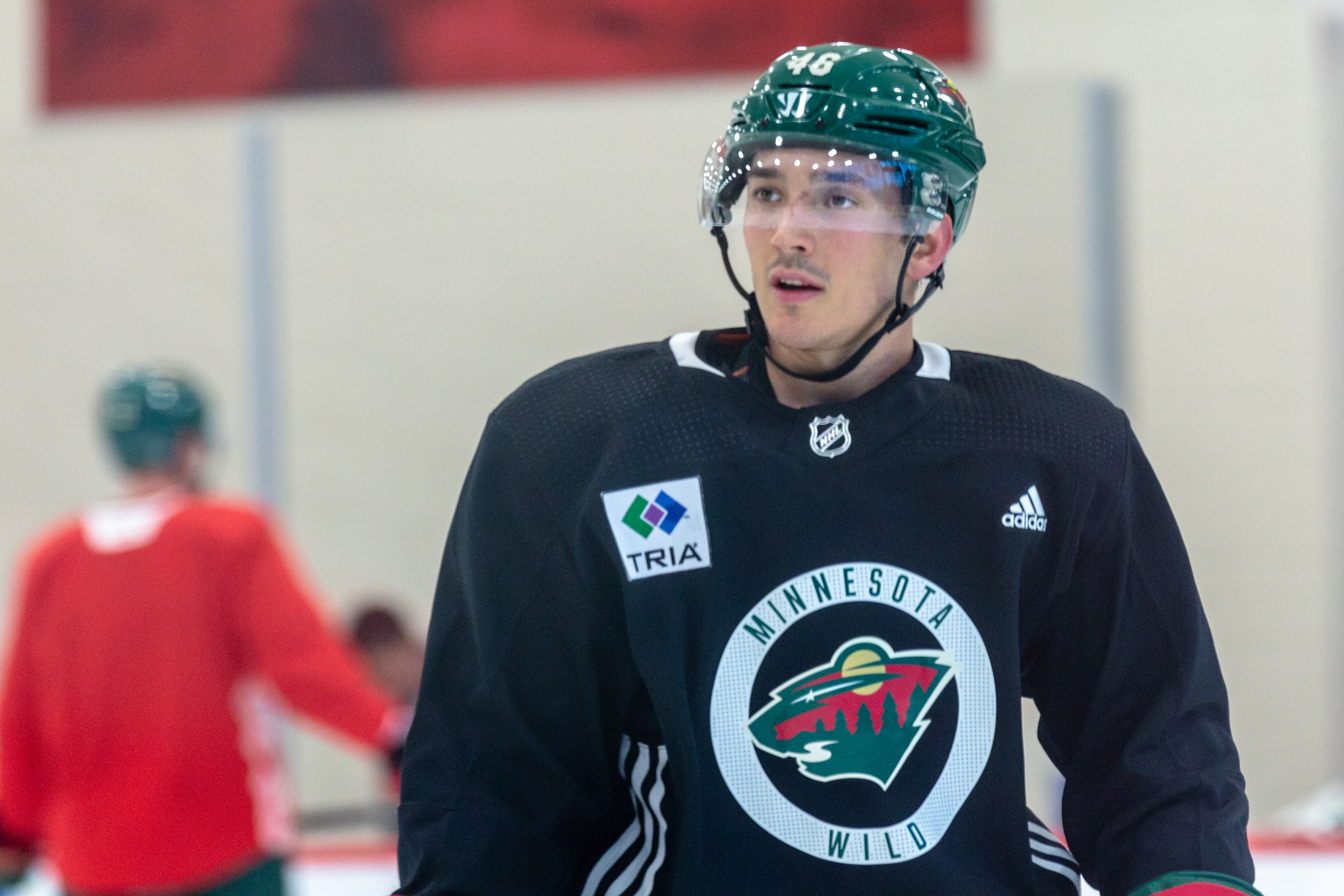
- Spurgeon with the Minnesota Wild in 2019
- Born: November 29, 1989 (age 36) Edmonton, Alberta, Canada
- Height: 5 ft 9 in (175 cm)
- Weight: 166 lb (75 kg; 11 st 12 lb)
- Position: Defence
- Shoots: Right
- NHL team Former teams: Minnesota Wild; SCL Tigers
- National team: Canada
- NHL draft: 156th overall, 2008; New York Islanders
- Playing career: 2010–present

Jared Spurgeon (born November 29, 1989) is a Canadian professional ice hockey player who is a defenceman and captain for the Minnesota Wild of the National Hockey League (NHL). Spurgeon was selected 156th overall by the New York Islanders in the 2008 NHL entry draft but joined the Wild after going unsigned by the Islanders.

Prior to the 2008 NHL Entry Draft, Spurgeon played three seasons of major junior hockey with the Spokane Chiefs of the Western Hockey League (WHL). He won both a WHL Championship and the 2008 CHL Memorial Cup with the Chiefs. Following the 2009–10 WHL season, Spurgeon joined the Minnesota Wild's American Hockey League affiliate, the Houston Aeros. He impressed the coaching staff through his first 23 games and earned his first NHL recall the day before his 21st birthday. Spurgeon made his NHL debut the following day and remained with the Wild for the remainder of the season.

== Early life ==
Spurgeon was born on November 29, 1989, in Edmonton, Alberta to Barry and Debbie Spurgeon. He grew up alongside his older brother Tyler, who also played ice hockey, and older sister Breanne. Growing up, Spurgeon was a fan of the Edmonton Oilers, specifically Doug Weight, because his grandfather had a pair of season tickets that he alternated between various Spurgeon family members.

== Playing career ==
Growing up in Alberta, Spurgeon played minor hockey alongside Tyler Ennis, and their fathers served as coaches on their teams. Although he was originally a forward, Spurgeon was changed to defence at the age of 13 while in peewee. Due to their short stature, Ennis and Spurgeon were both cut from their Bantam AAA team, so they then played together on the Knights of Columbus Squires U15 AAA team in the Alberta Elite Hockey League. In the 2004–05 season, Spurgeon recorded 35 points in 37 games and played in the 2005 Alberta Cup.

=== Western Hockey League (2005–2010) ===
As a result of his strong 2004–05 season, Spurgeon was drafted in the tenth round of the Western Hockey League draft by the Spokane Chiefs. He was also drafted by the Cedar Rapids RoughRiders in the United States Hockey League 2005 Futures Draft. Spurgeon made the jump to the WHL during the 2005-06 season, where he recorded three goals and nine assists for 12 points in his rookie season. He suffered a back injury in the 2006 off-season and missed the first month of the 2006–07 season to recover.

During the 2007–08 season, Spurgeon earned a larger role on the team as a member of their top power-play unit. His play earned him praise from head coach Bill Peters, who said: "He has real good on-ice vision and a superior hockey sense in my opinion...He competes very hard, he’s a pit bull out there and he’s an undersized guy but it doesn’t hold him back one bit." Spurgeon finished the regular season with a career-high 43 points and was named the Chiefs' Defenseman of the Year and Most Sportsmanlike Player of the Year. After Spurgeon and the Chiefs won the 2008 Memorial Cup, he was drafted 156th overall by the New York Islanders in the 2008 NHL entry draft. As he had not been contacted by any hockey scouts prior to the draft, Spurgeon had been prepared to enroll in college as a backup plan.

As one of the Chiefs' top defensemen in the 2008–09 season, Spurgeon set and matched two franchise records en route to a career-high 35 assists and 45 points. Spurgeon and the Chiefs started the season with a 16–9–0–3 record as the defenceman accumulated one goal and nine assists. As a result of his performance, Spurgeon was one of three Chiefs players selected to participate in the 2008 ADT Canada–Russia Challenge. In December 2008, Spurgeon attended Team Canada’s camp to qualify for their 2009 World Junior Ice Hockey Championships roster. Spurgeon finished the regular season with 10 goals and a career-high 35 assists for 45 points. His 10 goals ranked 25th amongst most goals scored in a single season by a Chiefs defenceman. He also allowed a franchise-low 145 goals against as a defenceman during the season, down from his previous record of 160. Spurgeon finished his fourth season with the Chiefs as their second consecutive Defenseman of the Year and earned the Player’s Player award for the first time.

As Spurgeon underwent shoulder surgery during the 2009 offseason, he did not participate in any games at the Chiefs camp or in the preseason. Despite missing the first 18 games of the season, Spurgeon finished the regular season with a career-high 43 assists and 51 points. When he made his season debut in November, Spurgeon recorded three assists. Spurgeon maintained a seven game point streak through February, during which he recorded three goals and nine assists. During this point streak, Spurgeon was recognized by Chiefs’ as one of their Top 25 Chiefs in 25 Years. Over his final 10 games of the season, Spurgeon had one goal and seven assists for a total of 170 points over his five seasons with the Chiefs, the fourth most for a Spokane defenseman. His 51 points were the 23rd most points by a Spokane defenseman in a single season and his 43 assists were the 21st by a team defensemen in a single season. Spurgeon was also named a finalist for the WHL's Brad Hornung Trophy as the league's Most Sportsmanlike Player.

=== Professional (2010–present) ===
After playing five seasons with the Spokane Chiefs, the Minnesota Wild invited the unsigned defenceman to attend their 2010–11 training camp. He scored a goal and an assist while representing the Wild at the 2010 Traverse City Rookie Tournament before signing a three-year, entry-level contract on September 23, 2010. He was subsequently assigned to their American Hockey League (AHL) affiliate, the Houston Aeros, to start the 2010–11 season. Spurgeon immediately impressed the Aeros coaching staff upon joining the team. Prior to his first NHL callup, he had maintained an eight-game point streak. Due to his small stature, sportswriter Michael Russo later confessed that he had refrained from reporting on Spurgeon's call-up because he initially dismissed it as a joke. As the callup was unexpected, the Wild's assistant equipment manager only had the jersey number 46 available in his size. Wearing number 46 for the Wild, Spurgeon played 14:42 minutes and registered one shot on goal in a 3–0 shutout loss to the Calgary Flames on November 29. Spurgeon then spent the majority of the regular season at the NHL level. On January 25, 2011, Spurgeon recorded his first career NHL point, an assist, in a game against the Chicago Blackhawks. He later scored his first career NHL goal on February 22, 2011, in his 31st career NHL game, against Nikolai Khabibulin of the Edmonton Oilers. Spurgeon finished the season as one of only three defencemen in NHL history who recorded only one penalty in at least 50 games. He also finished with eight assists. As the Wild failed to qualify for the 2011 Stanley Cup playoffs, Spurgeon was re-assigned to the Aeros for the Calder Cup playoffs. He helped the Aeros advance to the Calder Cup Finals before suffering an injury in Game 5. At the time of the injury, he had accumulated 11 points and a +5 rating in 23 games.

As a second-year player, Spurgeon was given more on-ice responsibility by the Wild through the 2011–12 season. Spurgeon participated in the Wild's 2011 training camp where he was paired with Marek Zidlicky on the second power-play unit. Although he missed one exhibition games due to bruised ribs, Spurgeon recovered by the Wild's opening night game. His defensive efforts helped the Wild start the 2011–12 season with a 7–3–3 record through the first 13 games. Spurgeon remained healthy through the first half of the Wild's season, playing in all 36 games and leading the team in ice time and average ice time per game. On December 26, 2011, Spurgeon suffered a lower-body injury as a result of a check by Colorado Avalanche forward Cody McLeod. He missed two games to recover before returning to the Wild's lineup on December 31 for their game against the Phoenix Coyotes. Spurgeon scored an accidental own goal during the game as the Wild fell 4–2. Spurgeon's sophomore season concluded on March 22 after suffering a concussion during a game against the Calgary Flames.

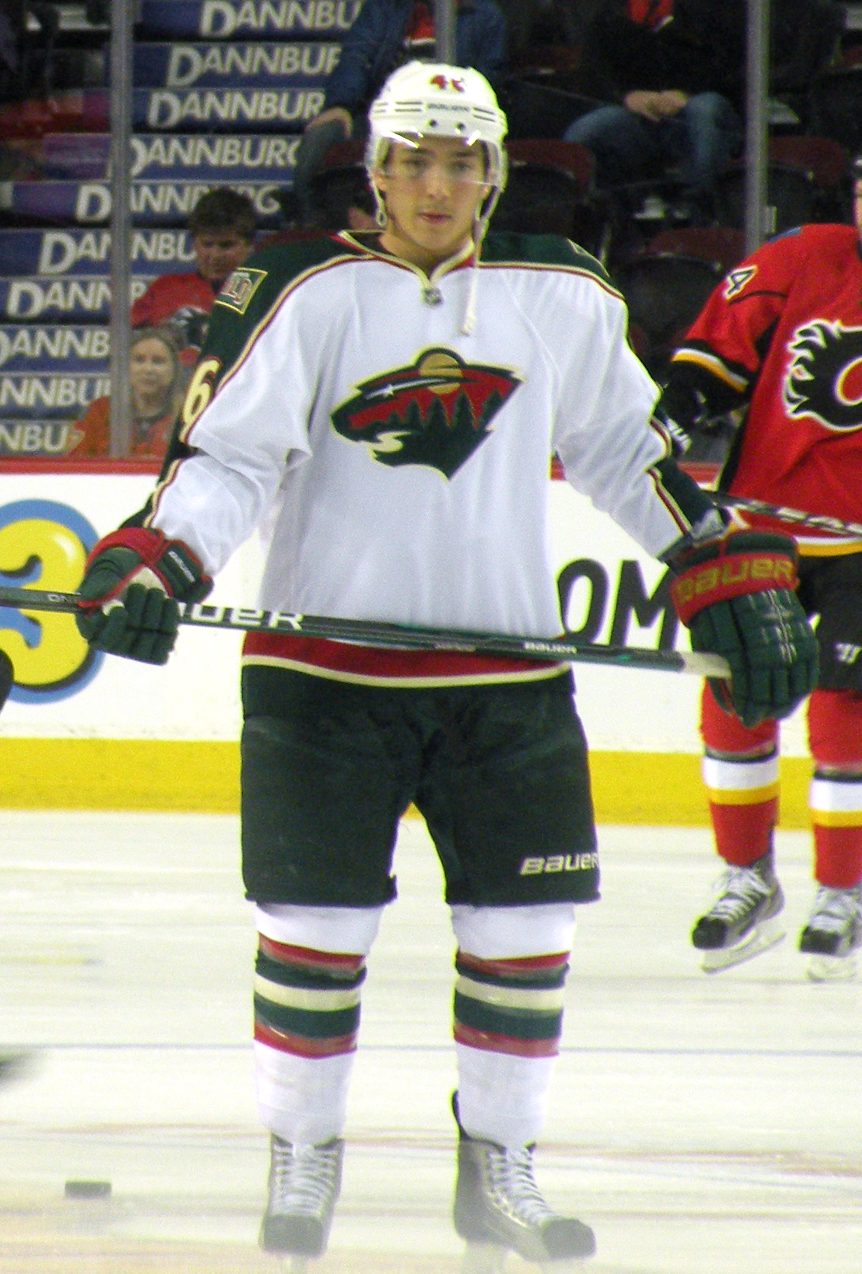
Spurgeon warming up with the Wild in 2011.

Due to the 2012–13 NHL lockout, Spurgeon and Ennis joined the SCL Tigers of the National League A (NLA) in Switzerland. He played 12 games with the SCL Tigers but suffered a groin injury when the lockout was near its end. He recorded five goals and 15 points through 39 games with the Wild in the 2012–13 season and signed a three-year contract extension on July 5, 2013.

Spurgeon began the 2013–14 season on the Wild's second defensive pairing with Marco Scandella. He spent a month on the Wild's injured reserve after injuring his left foot against the Buffalo Sabres on January 4. During his absence, the Wild maintained an 8-4-2 record. Spurgeon returned to the Wild's lineup on February 4 and recorded two assists in a 2–1 win over the Tampa Bay Lightning. During the 2014 Stanley Cup playoffs, Spurgeon set the franchise record for most goals by a Wild defenseman in the postseason with three goals over 13 games. In the Wild's first round series against the Avalanche, Spurgeon scored a late game-tying goal at the end of Game 6's third period to require a Game 7 elimination game.

On December 21, 2015, the Wild announced they re-signed Spurgeon to a four-year, $20.75 million contract extension. At the time of the extension, Spurgeon ranked third amongst defensemen in franchise history in goals, game-winning goals, power-play goals, and blocked shots.

On September 14, 2019, with one year remaining on his contract, Spurgeon signed a seven-year, $53.025 million contract extension with the Wild. At the time of the signing, Spurgeon led all franchise defensemen in goals and blocked shots and was tied for first in game winning goals with 13. On February 22, 2020, Spurgeon became the 12th defenseman in NHL history, and the second in Wild history, to have recorded a natural hat-trick.

==== Captaincy and injuries ====
Spurgeon was named the franchise's second full-time captain on January 3, 2021, before the start of the COVID-19 pandemic-delayed 2020–21 season. On January 31, during a game against the Colorado Avalanche, Spurgeon became the second defenceman in team history to record 200 career assists with the team. A few days later in another game against the Avalanche, Spurgeon suffered a lower-body injury and missed the remainder of the third period. While recovering from his lower-body injury, Spurgeon and various other teammates contracted a mild case of COVID-19. Due to the severity of the virus and the Wild's depleted members, the league cancelled the Wild's next four games. Spurgeon was removed from the Wild's COVID-19 protocol list on February 13, and rejoined the Wild's lineup on February 19 for their game against the Anaheim Ducks. The injury, illness, and delayed games resulted in a slow start for Spurgeon through the first 28 games of the season. After tallying only one goal and five assists, Spurgeon broke out offensively in the final 26 games of the season. Spurgeon broke his 26-game goalless drought, dating back to the Wild's final game of the regular season in 2020, by scoring twice on March 24, 2021, against the Ducks. On April 29, Spurgeon recorded his 300th career NHL point to become the third player and second defenseman in team history to reach the milestone. Over the final 26 games of the regular season, Spurgeon added six goals and 19 points for a total of seven goals and 18 assists. Beyond leading all Wild defensemen in scoring and assists, Spurgeon also led the team in blocked shots with 102, ranked third in power-play points with nine, and fourth in shots on goal with 94. Spurgeon and the Wild met with the Vegas Golden Knights in the first round of the 2021 Stanley Cup playoffs, but fell to them in seven games. On June 5, Spurgeon was named a finalist for the Lady Byng Memorial Trophy as the league's most gentlemanly player. During the 2021 offseason, Spurgeon was one of three defensemen the Wild protected from the 2021 NHL expansion draft.

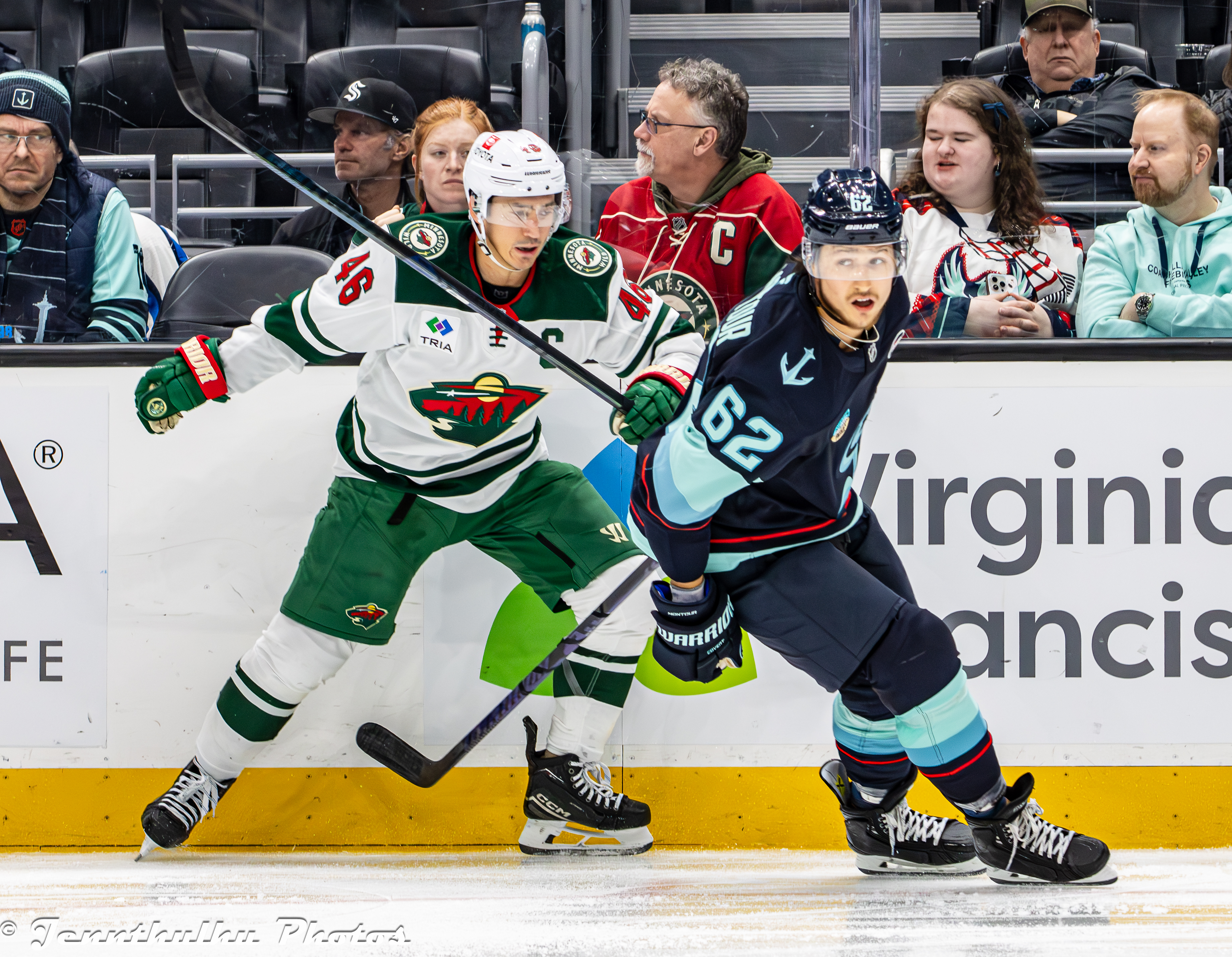
Spurgeon (left) in 2025.

As Spurgeon's former defensive partner Ryan Suter left the Wild for Dallas during the offseason, Alex Goligoski was signed to replace him on the Wild's top defensive pair for 2021–22. After delivering a cross-check to Pavel Buchnevich's right ankle during a game against the St. Louis Blues on May 2, Spurgeon was fined $5,000 by the NHL Department of Player Safety but avoided a suspension. He finished the regular season with 10 goals and a career-high 30 assists for 40 points over 65 games.

On October 22, 2022, Spurgeon scored his 100th NHL goal and 348th point to pass centre Pierre-Marc Bouchard for fifth on the Wild's all-time points list. On February 19, 2023, during a game against the Nashville Predators, Spurgeon became the Wild's franchise scoring leader among defenceman with 370 career points. On January 18, 2024, Spurgeon was ruled out for the rest of the 2023–24 season due to multiple injuries that required surgeries. After spending the remainder of the season recovering, Spurgeon returned to the Minnesota Wild lineup for the 2024–25 season. He accumulated four goals and nine assists for 13 points before suffering another in-season injury against the Predators. On February 2, Spurgeon became the first defenseman in franchise history and fourth overall to reach the 400 point milestone. His 400th and 401st career points were scored in his 900th career NHL game and helped him pass Zach Parise for third-most points in franchise history.

On March 14, 2026, he played in his 1,000th NHL game when the Wild played against the New York Rangers.

== Personal life ==
Spurgeon and his wife Danielle have four children together, two boys and two girls.

== Career statistics ==
=== Regular season and playoffs ===
			Regular season					Playoffs
Season	Team	League	GP	G	A	Pts	PIM	GP	G	A	Pts	PIM
2005–06	Spokane Chiefs	WHL	46	3	9	12	28	—	—	—	—	—
2006–07	Spokane Chiefs	WHL	38	4	15	19	16	—	—	—	—	—
2007–08	Spokane Chiefs	WHL	69	12	31	43	19	21	0	5	5	16
2008–09	Spokane Chiefs	WHL	59	10	35	45	37	12	2	3	5	10
2009–10	Spokane Chiefs	WHL	54	8	43	51	18	7	0	4	4	2
2010–11	Houston Aeros	AHL	23	2	7	9	10	23	1	10	11	10
2010–11	Minnesota Wild	NHL	53	4	8	12	2	—	—	—	—	—
2011–12	Minnesota Wild	NHL	70	3	20	23	6	—	—	—	—	—
2012–13	SCL Tigers	NLA	12	3	4	7	6	—	—	—	—	—
2012–13	Minnesota Wild	NHL	39	5	10	15	4	5	0	0	0	2
2013–14	Minnesota Wild	NHL	67	5	21	26	16	13	3	3	6	2
2014–15	Minnesota Wild	NHL	66	9	16	25	6	10	1	3	4	4
2015–16	Minnesota Wild	NHL	77	11	18	29	14	6	2	3	5	4
2016–17	Minnesota Wild	NHL	76	10	28	38	20	5	0	1	1	0
2017–18	Minnesota Wild	NHL	61	9	28	37	8	5	0	1	1	0
2018–19	Minnesota Wild	NHL	82	14	29	43	20	—	—	—	—	—
2019–20	Minnesota Wild	NHL	62	12	20	32	18	4	2	2	4	4
2020–21	Minnesota Wild	NHL	54	7	18	25	6	7	0	3	3	0
2021–22	Minnesota Wild	NHL	65	10	30	40	10	6	0	3	3	4
2022–23	Minnesota Wild	NHL	79	11	23	34	14	6	0	2	2	4
2023–24	Minnesota Wild	NHL	16	0	5	5	2	—	—	—	—	—
2024–25	Minnesota Wild	NHL	66	7	25	32	14	6	1	0	1	0
2025–26	Minnesota Wild	NHL	79	6	16	22	14	11	0	1	1	4
NHL totals			1,012	123	315	438	174	84	9	22	31	28

=== International ===
Year	Team	Event	Result	GP	G	A	Pts	PIM
2025	Canada	WC	5th	8	0	2	2	0
Senior totals				8	0	2	2	0

Sporting positions
Preceded by Mikko Koivu	Minnesota Wild captain 2021–present	Incumbent
