= Marcus Foligno =

Canadian ice hockey player (born 1991)

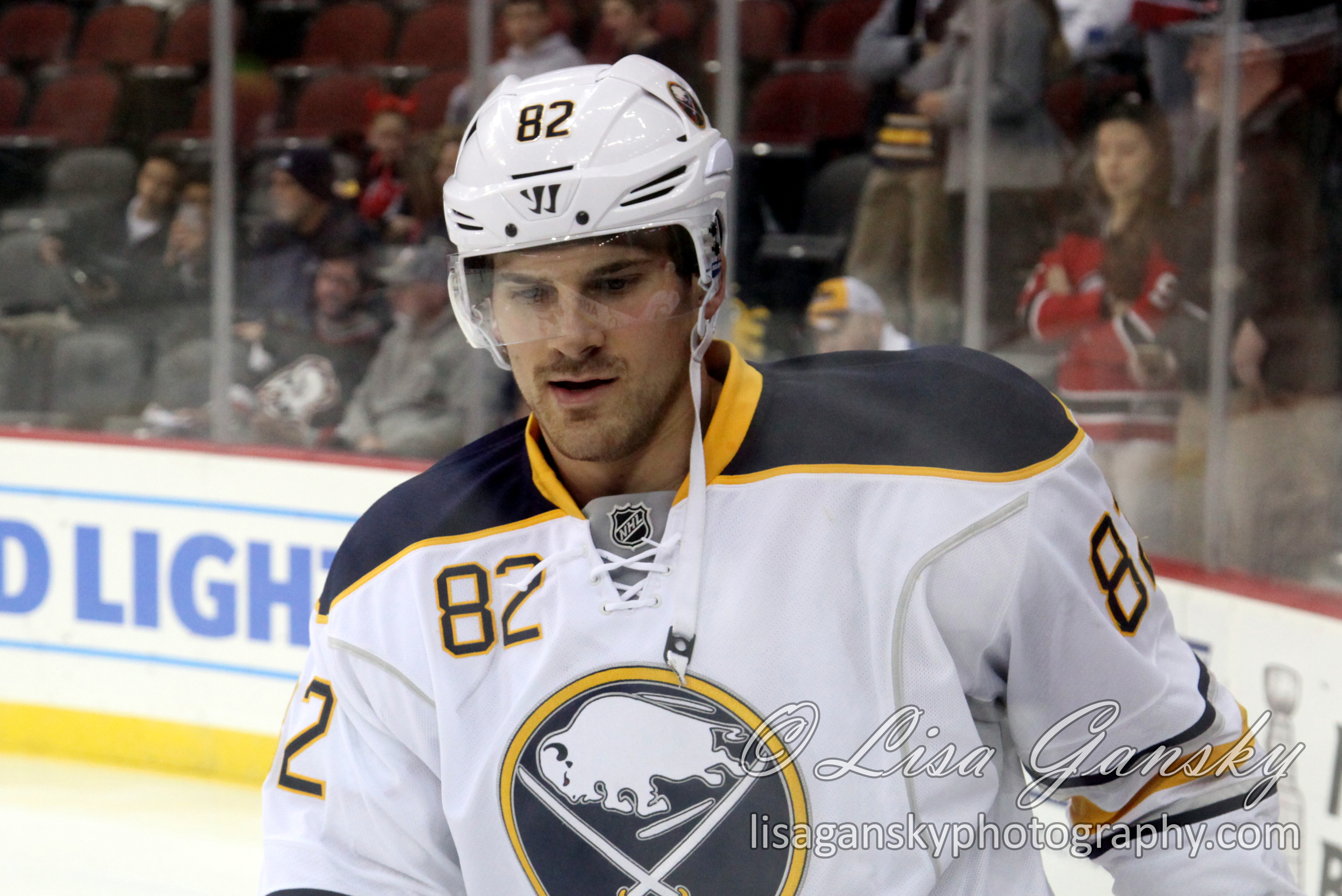
- Foligno with the Buffalo Sabres in 2016
- Born: August 10, 1991 (age 35) Buffalo, New York, U.S.
- Height: 6 ft 3 in (191 cm)
- Weight: 226 lb (103 kg; 16 st 2 lb)
- Position: Winger
- Shoots: Left
- NHL team Former teams: Minnesota Wild; Buffalo Sabres
- NHL draft: 104th overall, 2009; Buffalo Sabres
- Playing career: 2011–present

Marcus Foligno (/fəˈliːnoʊ/; born August 10, 1991) is an American-Canadian professional hockey player who is a winger and alternate captain for the Minnesota Wild of the National Hockey League (NHL). Nicknamed "Moose", he was selected 104th overall by the Buffalo Sabres in the 2009 NHL entry draft.

== Playing career ==
As a youth, Foligno played in the 2003 Quebec International Pee-Wee Hockey Tournament with a minor ice hockey team from Hershey, Pennsylvania.

=== Junior ===
Foligno was selected by the Ontario Hockey League (OHL)'s Sudbury Wolves in the second round, 39th overall, in the 2007 OHL Priority Selection, the same team that drafted his older brother, Nick. After two seasons with the club, Foligno was selected in the fourth round, 104th overall, by the Buffalo Sabres in the 2009 NHL entry draft. Foligno spent an additional two seasons with the Wolves, with his best coming during the 2010–11 season, in which he recorded 23 goals and 59 points in 47 games.

=== Buffalo Sabres ===
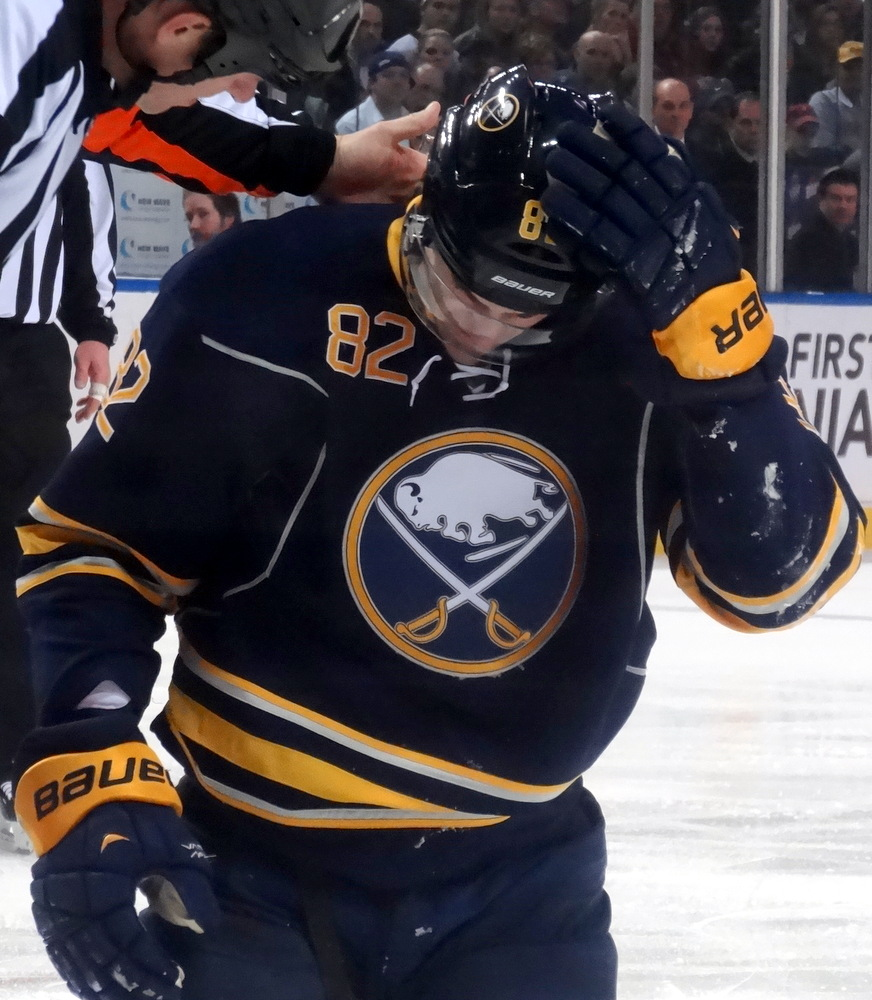
Foligno in February 2013.

Foligno agreed to terms on an entry-level professional contract with the Buffalo Sabres on May 25, 2011. He began play with the Sabres' American Hockey League (AHL) affiliate, the Rochester Americans, in the 2011–12 season. Foligno was called up to the Sabres on December 19, 2011, and made his NHL debut on December 20, playing against the Ottawa Senators, the team his brother Nick Foligno was playing with at the time. Marcus Foligno's second career start came March 10, 2012, again against his brother and the Ottawa Senators. Foligno scored his first career goal at 14:06 in the third period, which tied the game; Buffalo eventually won the game in a shootout.

Like his brother Nick, Marcus Foligno used their father's "Foligno Leap" as his first career goal celebration. However, on Marcus' first goal, he was unsure he actually scored. As a result, Marcus used the "Leap" on his next goal in Buffalo on March 14, 2012.

Foligno broke the family tradition and did not choose the numbers 17 (worn by his father) or 71 (worn by his brother). Upon being drafted by the Sabres, he elected to wear number 82 (assigned to him at camp), due to both 17 and 71 already being in use. Foligno was reassigned to the Americans immediately before the 2012–13 NHL lockout. However, this changed once he was traded to the Minnesota Wild, where he chose to wear the number 17.

On June 27, 2016, the Sabres issued a qualifying offer to Foligno. He was signed to a one-year contract on July 14, 2016. In the 2016–17 season, Foligno scored a career-best 13 goals in a checking-line role to match his 23 points from the previous season.

=== Minnesota Wild ===
As a restricted free agent, on June 30, 2017, Foligno was traded along with Tyler Ennis and a 2018 third-round pick to the Minnesota Wild in exchange for Marco Scandella, Jason Pominville and a 2018 fourth-round pick. On September 14, the Wild signed Foligno to a four-year, $11.5 million contract extension worth $2.875 million annually. Foligno was hospitalized on October 12, 2017, after taking a punch to the face from Chicago Blackhawks forward John Hayden during a fight in Minnesota's 5–2 win. According to The Athletic's Michael Russo, he may have suffered a "broken facial bone" as a result of the hit.

On January 12, 2021, Foligno signed a three-year, $9.3 million extension with the Wild.

On September 29, 2023, Foligno signed a four-year, $16 million extension with the Wild.

Foligno scored his first NHL hat-trick during a 6–3 win against the Toronto Maple Leafs on January 19, 2026. At the end of the 2025–26 season, he received the King Clancy Memorial Trophy in recognition of his charitable and humanitarian work. He was presented the trophy by his brother Nick, who earned it during the 2016–17 season.

== International play ==
Medal record

Men's ice hockey

Representing Canada

World Junior Championships
Silver medal – second place	2011 Canada	

Approaching his final junior season in the OHL with the Sudbury Wolves, Foligno was Invited to take part in Canada's 2011 national junior team selection camp for the 2011 World Junior Ice Hockey Championships. Making a positive impression, he was later selected to Canada's roster for the tournament, held in his birthplace of Buffalo, New York. He completed the tournament with two goals and four points in seven games as Canada claimed the silver medal.

== Personal life ==
Foligno was born in Buffalo, New York, the son of former NHL player and Buffalo Sabre Mike Foligno and Janis Foligno. Janis died of breast cancer in July 2009. Although Marcus was born in the United States, both of his parents are Canadian, making him a dual citizen; Foligno played for Canada in the 2011 World Junior Championship. Marcus is the younger brother of Wild teammate Nick Foligno. He also has two sisters, Lisa Foligno-Carey (married to Dan Carey) and Cara Foligno. Cara works in Buffalo, and Lisa works in Peterborough, Ontario. Foligno married Natascia Marcantognini on July 15, 2016 in Sudbury, ON. He is a passionate Christian.

== Career statistics ==
=== Regular season and playoffs ===
			Regular season					Playoffs
Season	Team	League	GP	G	A	Pts	PIM	GP	G	A	Pts	PIM
2005–06	Sudbury Wolves AAA	NOHA U15	31	16	15	31	133	—	—	—	—	—
2006–07	Sudbury Nickel Capitals AAA	GNML	35	23	17	40	74	8	2	5	7	40
2007–08	Sudbury Wolves	OHL	66	5	6	11	38	—	—	—	—	—
2008–09	Sudbury Wolves	OHL	65	12	18	30	96	6	1	2	3	9
2009–10	Sudbury Wolves	OHL	67	14	25	39	156	4	1	2	3	6
2010–11	Sudbury Wolves	OHL	47	22	36	59	92	8	2	1	3	24
2011–12	Rochester Americans	AHL	60	16	23	39	78	3	2	1	3	4
2011–12	Buffalo Sabres	NHL	14	6	7	13	9	—	—	—	—	—
2012–13	Rochester Americans	AHL	33	10	17	27	38	—	—	—	—	—
2012–13	Buffalo Sabres	NHL	47	5	13	18	41	—	—	—	—	—
2013–14	Buffalo Sabres	NHL	74	7	12	19	82	—	—	—	—	—
2014–15	Buffalo Sabres	NHL	57	8	12	20	50	—	—	—	—	—
2015–16	Buffalo Sabres	NHL	75	10	13	23	79	—	—	—	—	—
2016–17	Buffalo Sabres	NHL	80	13	10	23	73	—	—	—	—	—
2017–18	Minnesota Wild	NHL	77	8	15	23	72	5	1	0	1	16
2018–19	Minnesota Wild	NHL	82	7	12	19	55	—	—	—	—	—
2019–20	Minnesota Wild	NHL	59	11	14	25	30	4	0	1	1	5
2020–21	Minnesota Wild	NHL	39	11	15	26	49	7	0	2	2	0
2021–22	Minnesota Wild	NHL	74	23	19	42	112	6	0	2	2	14
2022–23	Minnesota Wild	NHL	65	7	14	21	97	6	1	0	1	35
2023–24	Minnesota Wild	NHL	55	10	12	22	59	—	—	—	—	—
2024–25	Minnesota Wild	NHL	77	14	15	29	75	6	3	1	4	6
2025–26	Minnesota Wild	NHL	56	8	5	13	67	11	2	1	3	8
NHL totals			931	148	188	336	950	45	7	7	14	84

=== International ===
Year	Team	Event	Result	GP	G	A	Pts	PIM
2011	Canada	WJC	2nd place, silver medalist(s)	7	2	2	4	2
Junior totals				7	2	2	4	2

== Awards and honours ==
Award	Year	Ref
OHL
CHL Top Prospects Game	2009	
Second All-Star Team	2011	
NHL
Rookie of the Month	March 2012	
King Clancy Memorial Trophy	2026	

Awards and achievements
Preceded by Aleksander Barkov	King Clancy Memorial Trophy winner 2026	Succeeded by Incumbent
