= Mikko Koivu =

Finnish ice hockey player (born 1983)

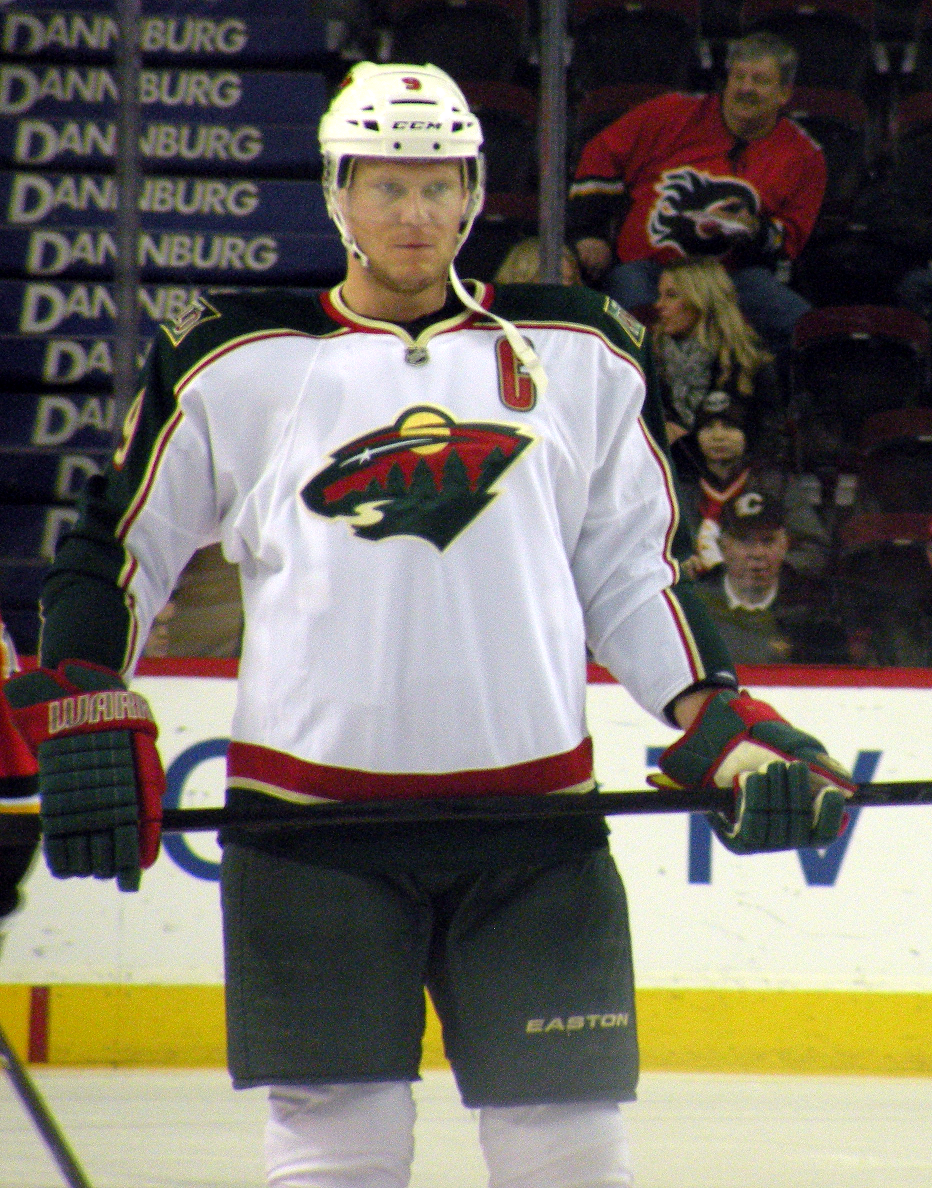
- Koivu with the Minnesota Wild in November 2011
- Born: 12 March 1983 (age 43) Turku, Finland
- Height: 6 ft 3 in (191 cm)
- Weight: 213 lb (97 kg; 15 st 3 lb)
- Position: Centre
- Shot: Left
- Played for: TPS; Minnesota Wild; Columbus Blue Jackets
- National team: Finland
- NHL draft: 6th overall, 2001; Minnesota Wild
- Playing career: 2000–2021
Medal record
Ice hockey
Representing Finland
Olympic Games
Silver medal – second place	2006 Turin
Bronze medal – third place	2010 Vancouver
World Championships
Gold medal – first place	2011 Slovakia
Silver medal – second place	2016 Russia
Silver medal – second place	2007 Russia
Bronze medal – third place	2008 Canada
Bronze medal – third place	2006 Latvia
World Cup
Silver medal – second place	2004 Toronto
World Junior Championships
Silver medal – second place	2001 Russia
Bronze medal – third place	2002 Czech Republic
World Junior U18 Championships
Gold medal – first place	2000 Switzerland
Bronze medal – third place	2001 Finland

Mikko-Sakari Koivu (born 12 March 1983) is a Finnish former professional ice hockey player. Koivu was drafted sixth overall in the 2001 NHL entry draft by the Minnesota Wild. After four seasons with TPS in the SM-liiga, Koivu joined the Wild in 2005. He spent fifteen seasons in Minnesota, including eleven as captain, accumulating several franchise records, including games played, assists and points scored. Koivu retired in 2021, after a short stint with the Columbus Blue Jackets.

Internationally, Koivu served as captain of the gold medal-winning Finnish national team at the 2011 World Championship.

== Playing career ==
After playing in the Finnish junior leagues, Koivu began playing for TPS of the SM-liiga as a 17-year-old in the 2000–01 season, the same team for which older brother Saku also once played. He was selected sixth overall in the 2001 NHL entry draft by the Minnesota Wild and continued to play with TPS for three more seasons.

=== Minnesota Wild (2005–20) ===
Koivu moved to North America for the 2004–05 season to play for Minnesota's American Hockey League (AHL) affiliate, the Houston Aeros, while that NHL season was canceled. He made his NHL debut with the Wild in early November 2005 after suffering an injury in the 2005–06 preseason. After scoring 21 points in his rookie season, Koivu signed a one-year contract with the Wild on 18 July 2006.

In 2006–07, Koivu improved to a career-high 20 goals, 34 assists and 54 points. Injuries slowed him down in his third season, however; in a game against the Vancouver Canucks, defenceman Mattias Öhlund retaliated to an unpenalized elbow from Koivu and slashed him, breaking a bone in Koivu's leg. Öhlund was given a four-game suspension and Koivu missed 24 games as a result of the injury.

On 30 June 2007, the Wild re-signed Koivu to a four-year, $13 million contract worth $3.25 million annually.

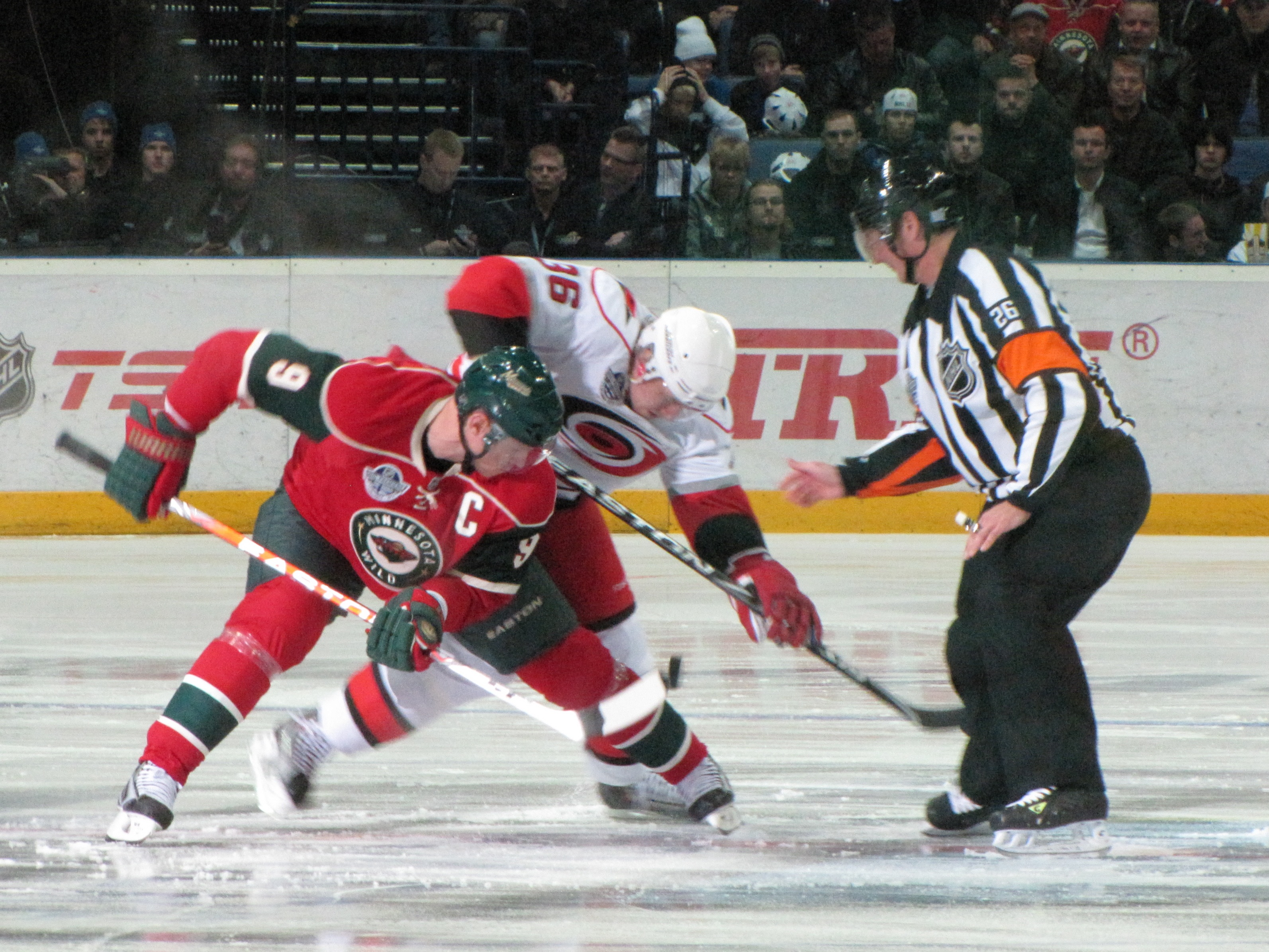
Koivu faces off against Carolina's Jussi Jokinen in October 2010

Before the 2008–09 season commenced, Koivu was announced as a permanent alternate captain for the entire season, along with teammate Andrew Brunette, assuming they were not captain for the month (the Wild captaincy was rotated among the players on a monthly basis, each season). But Koivu started the 2008–09 season as team captain for the months of October and November. Though rumors swirled that then-Wild Head Coach Jacques Lemaire was close to ending the captain rotation and naming Koivu the permanent captain, he was replaced by Kim Johnsson in December, reverting to his role as alternate captain. In January 2009, Koivu was once again honoured with the Wild captaincy after only a month's hiatus.

On 16 October 2008, Koivu tied a Wild franchise record for most assists in a game with four against the Florida Panthers. He also added a goal for a career-high five-point game as the Wild defeated Florida 6–2. In July 2009, it was announced that Koivu would be on the cover of Finland's version of EA Sports' video game NHL 10. He was also voted the best Finn in the League by NHL.com.

Koivu was named the first permanent captain in Wild franchise history on 20 October 2009. During the ensuing off-season, he signed a then-franchise-record seven-year, $47 million contract extension on 16 July 2010, which went into effect during the 2011–12 season.

On 12 January 2012, Koivu was selected to his first NHL All-Star Game. However, he was unable to participate due to injury and was replaced by Oilers forward Jordan Eberle.

On 18 March 2014, Koivu recorded three points in a 6–0 win over the New York Islanders, in the process becoming the Wild's all-time leading scorer with 438 points in 588 games.

On 28 February 2016, Koivu surpassed Nick Schultz's 743 games played with the Minnesota Wild to own this franchise record as well.

Koivu was named a finalist for the Frank J. Selke Trophy as the best defensive forward for the 2016–17 season, which was ultimately given to Boston Bruins centre Patrice Bergeron and Koivu finishing third in the voting behind Bergeron and Anaheim Ducks centre Ryan Kesler.

On 18 September 2017, the Wild signed Koivu to a two-year, $11 million contract extension worth $5.5 million annually.

On 6 February 2019, Koivu was ruled out for the remainder of the 2018–19 season after suffering a tear in his Anterior cruciate ligament (ACL) and meniscus in his right knee. The incident occurred the night before in a game against the Buffalo Sabres. He ended his season with eight goals and 29 points in 48 games.

The Wild retired Koivu's number 9 on March 13, 2022, becoming the first player in franchise history to receive that honor.

=== Columbus Blue Jackets (2020–21) and retirement ===
On 10 October 2020, Koivu ended his 15-year tenure with the Wild and signed as a free agent to a one-year, $1.5 million contract with the Columbus Blue Jackets. On 9 February 2021, after only posting a goal and an assist for 2 points in 7 games, Koivu announced his retirement from the NHL.

== International play ==
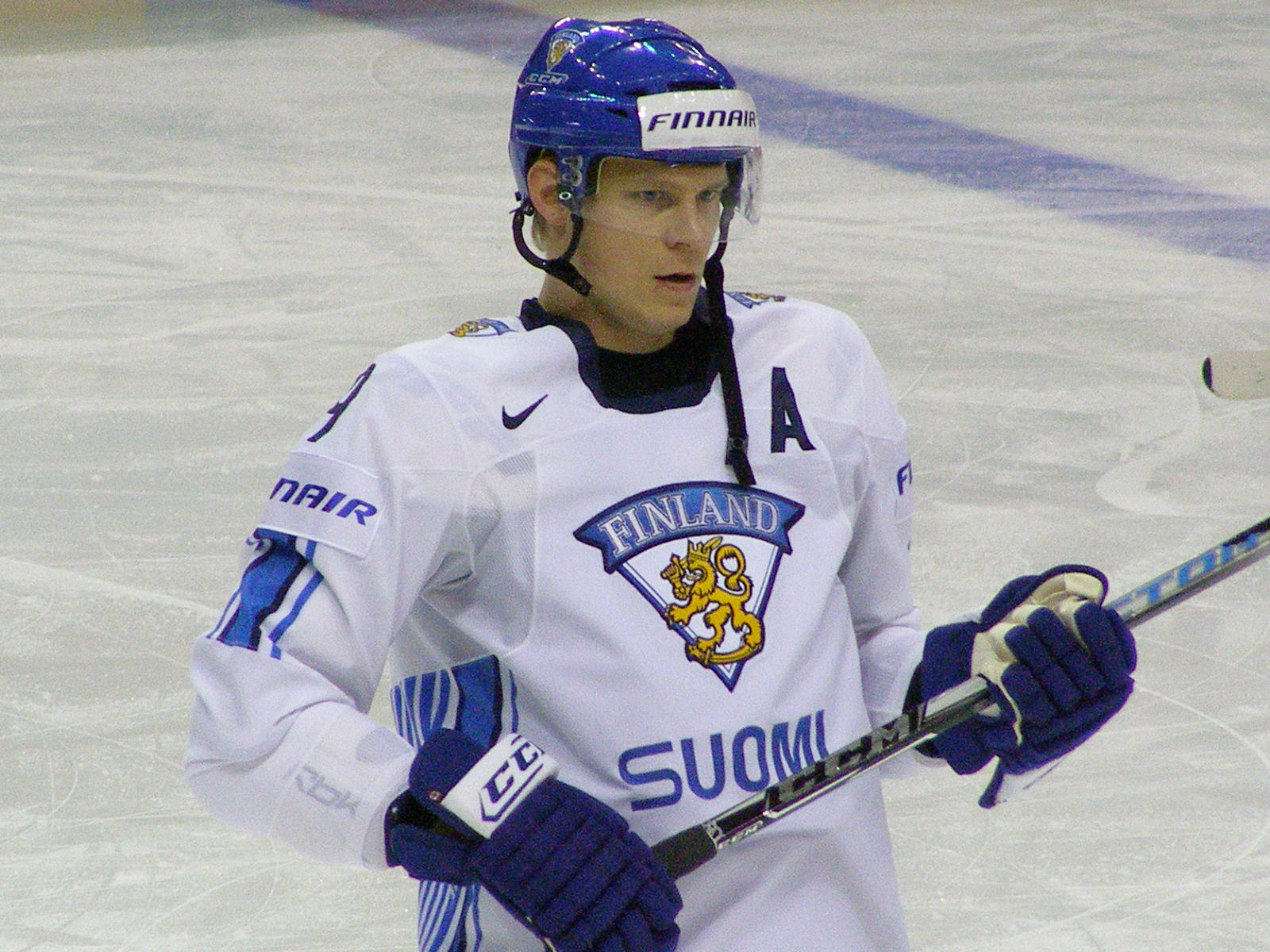
Koivu at the 2008 World Championships

As a junior, Koivu competed in two World Junior U18 Championships, capturing gold in 2000 and bronze in 2001. Koivu did double duty in 2001, also participating in the World Junior Championships, earning a silver medal while contributing three assists.

He played in his second World Junior Championship the following year in 2002, tallying five points in six games as Finland captured another silver medal. It also marked Koivu's fourth and final medal in junior international play. These junior years also marked the start for Koivu's long-time collaboration in the national team with Tuomo Ruutu, with whom he has been often paired as an effective playmaker-scorer duo ever since, in similar manner as his older brother Saku usually found himself with Teemu Selänne.

Before making his North American debut in the AHL, Koivu competed in the 2004 World Cup as Finland finished runner-up to Canada. Two years later, he appeared in the 2006 Winter Olympics in Turin. Koivu failed to register a point as Finland finished with a silver medal.

Beginning in 2006, Koivu appeared in three consecutive World Championships. He helped Finland to a bronze medal in 2006 with four points, then matched his output the following year with another four points in 2007 as Finland improved to a silver medal. In the 2008 World Championships, Koivu became a key contributor, tallying an international career-high nine points in nine games as Finland won the bronze medal. He was asked to join the team in 2009, and again in 2010, but he had to decline both times due to injuries.

Koivu was part of the team that won the bronze medal at the 2010 Winter Olympics in Vancouver, British Columbia, Canada. In 2011, Koivu was able to accept the invitation and led Finland, as the captain of the team, to its second gold medal at World Championships.

Koivu was also selected to represent Finland at the 2014 Winter Olympics in Sochi, but was forced to withdraw from the squad due to an injury sustained in the NHL.

Koivu was again named team captain of Finland for the 2016 World Cup of Hockey competition in Toronto. He was the only Finnish player to return to the tournament after playing in the 2004 edition.

== Personal life ==
Koivu's older brother is Saku Koivu, the longtime captain of the Montreal Canadiens and alternate captain for the Anaheim Ducks before his retirement in 2014. Their father is Jukka Koivu, the former head coach of TPS, for which both Saku and Mikko have played. Koivu's nephew Aatos Koivu was drafted 70th overall by the Montreal Candadiens in 2024. A number of Koivu's friends include Tuomo Ruutu of the New Jersey Devils and Koivu's former Minnesota teammate, Kurtis Foster. Mikko, his brother Saku and Miikka Kiprusoff along with former Supercell owners Ilkka Paananen and Mikko Kodisoja are all minority owners of HC TPS Turku Oy, the company which operates TPS Turku hockey team.

Koivu spends summers with his family and friends in his hometown of Turku, Finland. He owns a suite in the Xcel Energy Center, which he shares with former teammates Niklas Bäckström and Nick Schultz, called M&N's Suite 4 Kids, and the group donates it to children with serious medical conditions. Koivu served in the Finnish Army during the summer of 2011 as a conscript. On 14 October 2011, Koivu donated two rooms to the Minnesota Children's Hospital epilepsy and neurological unit.

Koivu married Estonian-born Helena Koivu (née Kipper) in the summer of 2014. They have one daughter and two sons together. The pair divorced in 2020. In October 2024, Koivu married American social media influencer Natalie Dillon.

== Records and awards ==
- Won the Finnish Championship (Kanada-malja) in 2000–01 SM-liiga season
- Won silver in 2003–04 SM-liiga season
- SM-Liiga regular season victory (Harry Lindblad Memorial Trophy): 2003–04
- Minnesota Wild franchise record for most assists in a game (tied): 4 (16 October 2008, against the Florida Panthers and again on 2 January 2011, against the Phoenix Coyotes).
- First ever permanent captain for the Minnesota Wild (20 October 2009).
- Selected to play in 2012 NHL All-Star Game, but unable to play due to injury.
- Gold Medal at IIHF World Championship 2011 (as captain of Team Finland).
- Minnesota Wild all-time franchise power-play points leader (as of 5 October 2015)
- Minnesota Wild all-time franchise points leader (709 as of 10 October 2020)
- Minnesota Wild all-time franchise games played leader (1,028 as of 10 October 2020)
- Named Selke Trophy Finalist (2016–17 season)
- First player in Minnesota Wild franchise history to play 1,000 NHL games and with the same team (as of 1 December 2019).
- First player to have number retired in Wild history

== Career statistics ==
=== Regular season and playoffs ===
			Regular season					Playoffs
Season	Team	League	GP	G	A	Pts	PIM	GP	G	A	Pts	PIM
1999–2000	TPS	FIN U18	11	4	9	13	8	—	—	—	—	—
1999–2000	TPS	FIN U20	30	4	8	12	22	13	1	4	5	8
2000–01	TPS	FIN U20	26	9	36	45	26	3	1	1	2	6
2000–01	TPS	SM-l	21	0	1	1	2	—	—	—	—	—
2000–01	TPS	FIN U18	—	—	—	—	—	7	2	10	12	2
2001–02	TPS	FIN U20	2	0	1	1	12	—	—	—	—	—
2001–02	TPS	SM-l	48	4	3	7	34	8	0	3	3	4
2002–03	TPS	SM-l	37	7	13	20	20	7	2	2	4	6
2003–04	TPS	SM-l	45	6	24	30	36	13	1	7	8	8
2004–05	Houston Aeros	AHL	67	20	28	48	47	5	1	0	1	2
2005–06	Minnesota Wild	NHL	64	6	15	21	40	—	—	—	—	—
2006–07	Minnesota Wild	NHL	82	20	34	54	58	5	1	0	1	4
2007–08	Minnesota Wild	NHL	57	11	31	42	42	6	4	1	5	4
2008–09	Minnesota Wild	NHL	79	20	47	67	66	—	—	—	—	—
2009–10	Minnesota Wild	NHL	80	22	49	71	50	—	—	—	—	—
2010–11	Minnesota Wild	NHL	71	17	45	62	50	—	—	—	—	—
2011–12	Minnesota Wild	NHL	55	12	32	44	28	—	—	—	—	—
2012–13	TPS	SM-l	10	5	5	10	16	—	—	—	—	—
2012–13	Minnesota Wild	NHL	48	11	26	37	26	5	0	0	0	8
2013–14	Minnesota Wild	NHL	65	11	43	54	24	13	1	6	7	10
2014–15	Minnesota Wild	NHL	80	14	34	48	38	10	1	4	5	2
2015–16	Minnesota Wild	NHL	82	17	39	56	40	6	3	2	5	2
2016–17	Minnesota Wild	NHL	80	18	40	58	34	5	1	1	2	0
2017–18	Minnesota Wild	NHL	82	14	31	45	46	5	0	4	4	2
2018–19	Minnesota Wild	NHL	48	8	21	29	22	—	—	—	—	—
2019–20	Minnesota Wild	NHL	55	4	17	21	28	4	0	0	0	6
2020–21	Columbus Blue Jackets	NHL	7	1	1	2	2	—	—	—	—	—
SM-l totals			161	22	46	68	108	28	3	12	15	18
NHL totals			1,035	206	505	711	594	59	11	17	28	38

=== International ===
Year	Team	Event	Result	GP	G	A	Pts	PIM
2000	Finland	WJC18	1st place, gold medalist(s)	7	0	4	4	8
2001	Finland	WJC	2nd place, silver medalist(s)	7	0	3	3	8
2001	Finland	WJC18	3rd place, bronze medalist(s)	6	2	3	5	6
2002	Finland	WJC	3rd place, bronze medalist(s)	7	1	5	6	4
2004	Finland	WCH	2nd place, silver medalist(s)	4	0	1	1	2
2006	Finland	OG	2nd place, silver medalist(s)	8	0	0	0	6
2006	Finland	WC	3rd place, bronze medalist(s)	9	2	2	4	8
2007	Finland	WC	2nd place, silver medalist(s)	9	2	2	4	26
2008	Finland	WC	3rd place, bronze medalist(s)	9	4	5	9	6
2010	Finland	OG	3rd place, bronze medalist(s)	6	0	4	4	2
2011	Finland	WC	1st place, gold medalist(s)	9	2	6	8	4
2012	Finland	WC	4th	10	3	8	11	4
2016	Finland	WC	2nd place, silver medalist(s)	10	4	6	10	12
2016	Finland	WCH	8th	3	0	0	0	0
Junior totals				27	3	15	18	26
Senior totals				77	17	34	51	70

== See also ==
- Notable families in the NHL
- List of Olympic medalist families
- List of NHL players with 1,000 games played

Awards and achievements
Preceded by Marián Gáborík	Minnesota Wild first-round draft pick 2001	Succeeded by Pierre-Marc Bouchard
Sporting positions
Preceded by Nick Schultz; Marián Gáborík; Kim Johnsson; Andrew Brunette	Minnesota Wild captain February 2008; October and November 2008; January 2009; March 2009–2020	Succeeded by Marián Gáborík; Kim Johnsson; Andrew Brunette; Jared Spurgeon
