= Battle of Ontario =

National Hockey League rivalry

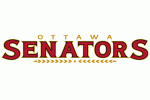
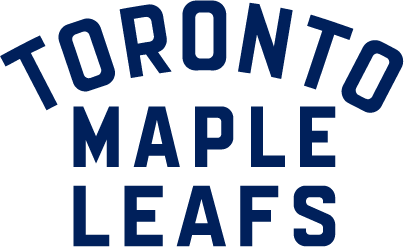
- Ottawa Senators Toronto Maple Leafs
- First meeting: October 20, 1992
- Latest meeting: October 3, 2026
- Next meeting: January 20, 2027

Statistics
- Total meetings: 182
- All-time series: 90–76–3–13 (OTT)
- Regular season series: 80–56–3–13 (OTT)
- Postseason results: 20–10 (TOR)
- Largest victory: OTT 8–0 TOR; October 29, 2005
- Longest win streak: OTT W7
- Current win streak: OTT W4

Postseason history
- 2000 conference quarterfinals: Maple Leafs won, 4–2; 2001 conference quarterfinals: Maple Leafs won, 4–0; 2002 conference semifinals: Maple Leafs won, 4–3; 2004 conference quarterfinals: Maple Leafs won, 4–3; 2025 first round: Maple Leafs won, 4–2

The Battle of Ontario (French: Bataille de l'Ontario) is a National Hockey League (NHL) rivalry between the Ottawa Senators and the Toronto Maple Leafs. Both teams compete in the Atlantic Division and with current NHL scheduling, they meet four times per season. Games between the teams were often televised nationally on Hockey Night in Canada, replaced by Sportsnet's Saturday Night Hockey starting with the 2026–27 season. The rivalry has been described as one of the NHL's top rivalries due to the two teams meeting each other in the postseason throughout the early 2000s.

== Background ==
Games between Toronto and Ottawa ice hockey teams date back before the founding of the NHL. In 1891, the original Senators defeated the Toronto St. George's to win the Ontario ice hockey title. In February 1904, the original Ottawa Senators, aka the 'Silver Seven', defeated the Toronto Marlboros in a Stanley Cup challenge. The Senators were founding members of the National Hockey Association (NHA) in 1910 and Toronto teams joined the NHA two years later. In 1917, the Toronto NHA franchise was turned over to the NHL and joined the Senators as one of the founding teams of the NHL. After the original Ottawa NHL franchise relocated to St. Louis, as the Eagles in 1934, and with the coming of television broadcasting of NHL games in the 1950s, Ottawa-area NHL fans became fans of other NHL teams. A Toronto–Ottawa sports rivalry continued between the Argonauts and the Rough Riders of the Canadian Football League (CFL).

== History ==
The current Senators entered the NHL in 1992, but the rivalry with the Maple Leafs did not begin to emerge until the late 1990s. From 1992 to 1998, Toronto was in the Western Conference and Ottawa was in the Eastern Conference, which meant that the two teams rarely played each other. However, before the 1998–99 season, the conferences and divisions were re-aligned, and Toronto was moved into the Eastern Conference's Northeast Division with the Senators, Montreal Canadiens, Boston Bruins, and Buffalo Sabres.

The Maple Leafs and Senators met for the first time in the playoffs in 2000, with the Maple Leafs dispatching the Senators in six games. Some Maple Leafs fans saw this as revenge, since the Senators' Marian Hossa accidentally clipped the Maple Leafs' Bryan Berard in the eye on March 11, ending the young defenceman's season and almost his career.

=== 21st century ===
The next season, Toronto and Ottawa met again in the first round, as the Senators entered the playoffs ranked second in the conference and the Maple Leafs seventh. While the Senators were expected to defeat the Maple Leafs, especially since they had swept the regular season series against them, the Maple Leafs instead swept the series in a major upset; Ottawa did not score its first goal of the series until 16:51 of the third period in the third game.

In 2001–02, the teams met in the playoffs for the third straight year. The two teams were evenly matched, and the Maple Leafs managed to win the second-round series in the full seven games and advance to the conference finals. One notable incident occurred late in game five, when Senators captain Daniel Alfredsson hit Maple Leafs' forward Darcy Tucker in a questionable hit-from-behind, which did not draw a penalty. Seconds after hitting Tucker, Alfredsson scored the game-winning goal.

In 2002–03, the rivalry hit an all-time high during a regular season game on March 4, when Darcy Tucker attacked the Senators' Chris Neil, who was sitting on the bench. This resulted in numerous players exchanging punches before order was restored. Tucker, Neil, and Ottawa's Shane Hnidy all received fighting majors and game misconducts for the same incident. After the game, Tucker claimed Neil spit on him, an allegation which Neil denied. The NHL board looked into this claim and concluded that Tucker's allegation was false. Tempers remained frayed, especially with 1:23 to play, when Toronto's Tie Domi went after the Senators' Magnus Arvedson, throwing several punches at him. Video evidence showed Arvedson spearing Domi just prior, awaiting the faceoff. Domi received a roughing minor, instigator minor, fighting major, misconduct and game misconduct. Arvedson did not get a penalty on the play. Suspensions were announced a few hours after Tucker and Domi appeared at NHL head offices in Toronto for a hearing. Tucker was suspended for five games, without pay, after it was determined that Neil did not spit at Toronto's bench. Domi was suspended for three games, also without pay. A total of 163 minutes in penalties were called in the game.

On January 6, 2004, during a game against the Nashville Predators, Toronto captain Mats Sundin's stick broke on an attempted shot at the blue line and he threw it away in disgust. Instead of hitting the glass, the stick accidentally went over the boards and into the crowd, and the NHL reacted by giving Sundin a one-game suspension. The game he was suspended for was a game against the Senators in Toronto; during the game, Daniel Alfredsson's stick broke, and he immediately faked a toss of his stick into the stands. This caused an uproar with the Maple Leafs, in part because they also lost the game 7–1. Alfredsson dismissed the Maple Leafs' reaction, calling it an overreaction. This incident added to the rivalry, and Maple Leafs fans booed Alfredsson at every opportunity for the remainder of his career.

Ottawa and Toronto matched up in the playoffs for the fourth time in five years in 2003–04. After the Maple Leafs took game five to lead the series 3–2, Alfredsson guaranteed a Senators victory in game six. He delivered on his promise, but Ottawa goaltender Patrick Lalime turned in a lacklustre performance in the series-deciding game seven, allowing two soft goals to Joe Nieuwendyk, and the Maple Leafs won the series.

=== Post-lockout era ===
In 2005–06, the two teams nearly met again in the playoffs, but the Maple Leafs missed qualifying by two points. As the Senators clinched the top spot in the Eastern Conference, the Maple Leafs claiming eighth position would have ensured a first-round match-up. The Senators largely dominated the season series by winning seven of the eight games (including three routs of 8–0, 8–2 and 7–0).

In 2006–07, the Maple Leafs failed to qualify for the playoffs, finishing in ninth position and missing for a second consecutive year. Meanwhile, the Senators made it to the Stanley Cup Final and became the first Ontario-based team to reach the NHL's championship series since the Maple Leafs' most recent title four decades prior. The Senators won the season series 5–1–2.

The 2007–08 season was characterized by a share of lopsided victories by the two teams against each other, for example, wins of 5–0 and 8–2. The Maple Leafs failed to make the playoffs for the third-straight season, this time by 11 points. Ottawa finished in seventh place in the conference after a 15–2 start and leading the league at one point, barely making it into the playoffs. The Senators were swept 4–0 in the first round by the Pittsburgh Penguins in a rematch of the previous year's series.

The 2008–09 season was a poor one for both teams, with the Senators finishing eleventh and the Maple Leafs twelfth in the Eastern Conference. This marked the first time that both Ontario teams failed to qualify for the Stanley Cup playoffs since the Senators joined the NHL in 1992.

The 2009–10 season saw the Senators finish fifth in the conference and face the Pittsburgh Penguins in the first round of the playoffs, while the Maple Leafs finished last in the conference and failed to make the playoffs for the fifth consecutive year. The Maple Leafs won the season series, however, 4–2.

The 2010–11 season was a poor one for both the Ontario teams. Despite the Maple Leafs posting its best regular season record since the 2006–07 season, the team missed the playoffs for the sixth consecutive season. Meanwhile, the Senators finished with a record of 32–40–10 and missed the playoffs for the second time in three seasons. The 74 points put up by the Senators was the lowest total put up since the 1995–96 season. The season series was tied 3–3.

The 2011–12 season saw Ottawa hosting the 59th NHL All-Star Game. A franchise-high five Senators were elected to the team – Daniel Alfredsson, Milan Michálek, Erik Karlsson, Jason Spezza and Colin Greening represented the Senators. Meanwhile, Phil Kessel, Joffrey Lupul and Dion Phaneuf represented the Maple Leafs. Senators defenceman Erik Karlsson ended the season with 78 points and won the Norris Trophy. The Senators finished eighth in the Eastern Conference and qualified for the playoffs, while the Maple Leafs once again failed to qualify for the seventh consecutive season. The season series was again tied 3–3.

The 2012–13 season was cut short by the lockout, which delayed opening day until January 19, 2013. The Maple Leafs and Senators met five times in the 48-game season, with the Maple Leafs taking the season series 4–1. Toronto finished the shortened season in fifth place in the conference and clinched their first playoff spot since 2004, while Ottawa finished seventh. The Senators matched up against the Montreal Canadiens in the first round. They took the series in five games before falling to the Pittsburgh Penguins in the second round. The Maple Leafs lost in game seven against the Boston Bruins and failed to pass the first round.

The 2013–14 season saw both Ontario teams miss the playoffs for the first time since the 2010–11 season. The Maple Leafs and Senators met four times in the 82-game season, two of which were decided in shootouts. The Maple Leafs took the season series 3–1. The Senators would finish 11th with 88 points, and the Maple Leafs finished in 12th place with 84 points.

The 2014–15 season saw the Senators finish seventh in the Eastern Conference with 99 points, securing the first wildcard playoff position. The Maple Leafs failed to make the playoffs finishing last in with 68 points. On October 22, 2014, the game between the Maple Leafs and Senators was postponed due to the 2014 Ottawa shootings. It was rescheduled for November 9, in which the Maple Leafs won 5–3. The Maple Leafs took the season series 3–2, two games were settled in overtime or shootout.

The 2015–16 season ended with the Senators sweeping the season series 4–0 over the Maple Leafs. The Senators finished fifth in the Atlantic Division and eight points out of playoff contention. The Maple Leafs had a season finishing last in the league. On February 9, 2016, there was a rare trade between the two division rivals. The trade saw Maple Leaf's captain Dion Phaneuf, Matt Frattin, Casey Bailey, Ryan Rupert, and Cody Donaghey traded to Ottawa for Jared Cowen, Milan Michálek, Colin Greening, Tobias Lindberg, and a 2017 second-round pick.

The 2016–17 season proved to be a successful season for both teams. The Maple Leafs came into the season loaded with rookies, while the Senators were a mix of young and veteran players. In the season opener, Ottawa and Toronto faced each other. The Maple Leafs' rookie centre Auston Matthews scored four goals in his NHL debut, but the Senators prevailed 5–4 in overtime. Ottawa won 3–1 in the season series. The Senators and Maple Leafs surprised many, as Ottawa finished second in the Atlantic, while Toronto grabbed the second wild card spot in the playoffs. Toronto fell short to the Washington Capitals in game six of the first round. Ottawa continued their postseason run to the second overtime of game seven of the Eastern Conference finals against the Pittsburgh Penguins (beating the Boston Bruins and New York Rangers).

After the 2018–19 season, the Maple Leafs and Senators made another major trade. The Maple Leafs traded Nikita Zaitsev, Connor Brown, and prospect Michael Carcone to the Ottawa Senators for Cody Ceci, Ben Harpur, prospect Aaron Luchuck, and a 2020 third-round pick.

For the shortened 2020–21 season, the two teams played each other nine times in the North Division as the NHL temporarily realigned the divisions due to the COVID-19 pandemic. On February 15, 2021, Toronto blow a 5–1 lead against Ottawa, losing 6–5 in overtime. Nick Paul of the Senators started the comeback with a shorthanded goal. In the third period, Artyom Zub scored his first NHL goal on a breakaway after exiting the penalty box. Connor Brown later scored just after a power play, and Evgenii Dadonov tied the game with two minutes to play with Ottawa goaltender Marcus Högberg on the bench for an extra attacker. In the overtime, the Maple Leafs nearly scored, however, Dadonov made a save while in the crease, and then was set up on a breakaway. Dadonov scored to win the game 6–5. This comeback marked the first win by Ottawa after trailing by four goals at any point in a game.

On February 10, 2024, during the 2023–24 season, at the end of a 5–3 Senators win over the Maple Leafs, Senators forward Ridly Greig took a slap shot to score an empty net breakaway goal. Maple Leafs defenceman Morgan Rielly responded by cross-checking Greig in the head, leading to a brawl between both teams. In the aftermath, Morgan Rielly received a five-minute major and a game misconduct, and would later be suspended for five games.

The Maple Leafs and Senators met once again in the first round of the 2025 Stanley Cup playoffs, the first playoff meeting for both teams since 2004. Toronto won the series in six games.

On July 7, 2026, former Senators' captain and then coach, Daniel Alfredsson, left Ottawa's organization after working with them for three years, and joined Jim Hiller's coaching staff on the Maple Leafs. In Toronto, Alfredsson was reunited with Swedish teammate and rival, Mats Sundin, who was hired as senior advisor to hockey operations for Toronto.
