= Scott Hartnell =

Canadian ice hockey player (born 1982)

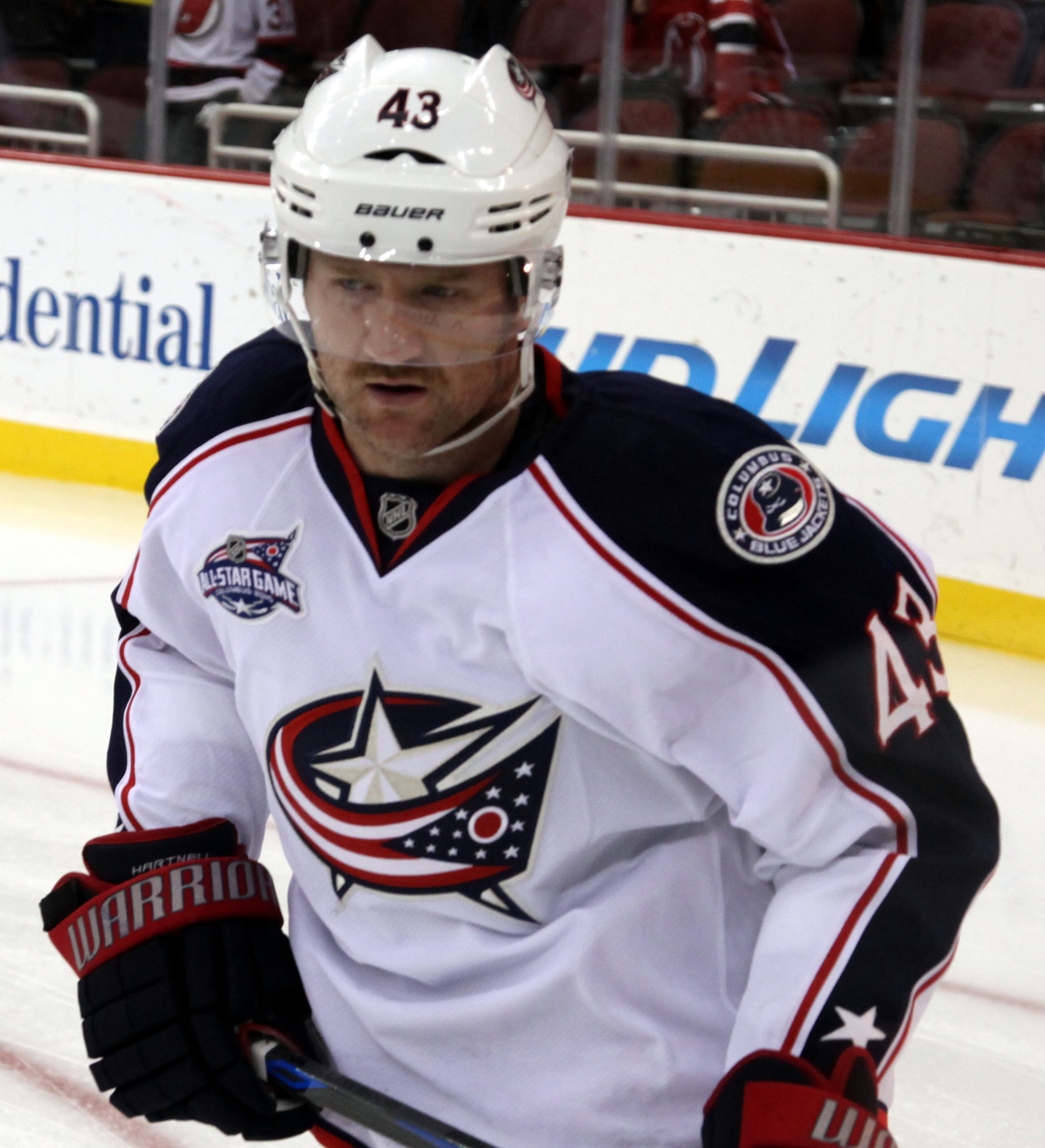
- Hartnell with the Columbus Blue Jackets in 2014
- Born: April 18, 1982 (age 44) Regina, Saskatchewan, Canada
- Height: 6 ft 2 in (188 cm)
- Weight: 215 lb (98 kg; 15 st 5 lb)
- Position: Left wing
- Shot: Left
- Played for: Nashville Predators; Philadelphia Flyers; Columbus Blue Jackets
- National team: Canada
- NHL draft: 6th overall, 2000; Nashville Predators
- Playing career: 2000–2018
- Website: hartnelldown.com

Scott Wesley Hartnell (born April 18, 1982) is a Canadian former professional ice hockey left winger who played 17 seasons in the National Hockey League (NHL) with the Nashville Predators, Philadelphia Flyers and Columbus Blue Jackets. Hartnell was born in Regina, Saskatchewan, but grew up in Lloydminster, Alberta. Throughout his career, Hartnell was known as a “gritty power forward” and an enforcer, with a total of 1,809 penalty minutes.

== Playing career ==
=== Junior ===
Prior to entering the NHL, Hartnell played two seasons of Canadian Junior-A hockey for the Lloydminster Blazers of the Alberta Junior Hockey League (AJHL). He then spent two seasons playing for the Prince Albert Raiders of the Western Hockey League (WHL). In the 1999–2000 season, Hartnell, as captain, led the team with 82 points and was named team MVP. He was also chosen to play for Bobby Orr in the Canadian Hockey League (CHL) Top Prospects Game.

=== Professional ===
==== Nashville Predators ====
Hartnell was the sixth overall pick in the 2000 NHL entry draft by the Nashville Predators. Considered a gritty power forward at 6 ft 2 in (1.88 m) tall, the left winger was the youngest player in franchise history to play for the Predators, as well as the youngest player in the NHL in the 2000–01 season. Hartnell's first NHL game was played in Japan against the Pittsburgh Penguins as part of a two-game set planned by the NHL to raise international interest in the League. Hartnell has stated that this game marks his favourite NHL moment.

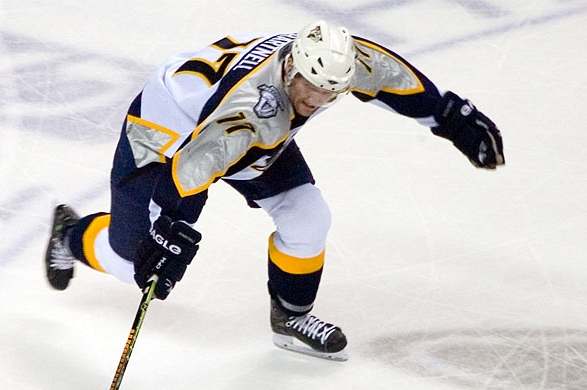
Hartnell as a Predator

Through six seasons with the Predators, Hartnell played in 453 games, accumulating 93 goals and 118 assists. During the 2003–04 season, Hartnell had three game-winning goals, two of which came in overtime. In his first career playoff series against the Detroit Red Wings in 2004, he tied the team high with three points (one goal and two assists).

During the 2004–05 NHL lock-out, Hartnell helped Vålerenga win the Norwegian Championship, scoring 12 goals in 11 playoff games.

In the 2005–06 season, Hartnell accumulated a career-high 25 goals and 23 assists for a total of 48 points. Additionally, Hartnell scored his first career hat-trick on February 4, 2006, in a game against the Chicago Blackhawks. The first two goals of the trifecta were scored against Adam Munro, with the final goal coming against Craig Anderson. The following season, Hartnell continued to produce similar offensive numbers, also setting franchise records for career penalty minutes (461) and for the fastest two goals by an individual (23 seconds). All of this was despite a broken foot, which resulted in Hartnell missing all of March.

==== Philadelphia Flyers ====
On June 18, 2007, Hartnell, along with Kimmo Timonen, were traded to the Philadelphia Flyers in exchange for a first-round pick previously acquired from Nashville for Peter Forsberg. Hartnell almost immediately signed a six-year contract worth $25.2 million.

In his first season with the Flyers, Hartnell was one of a series of five Flyers suspended for questionable on-ice hits. Specifically, Hartnell was suspended for two games as a result of a hit on Andrew Alberts of the Boston Bruins. Additionally, Hartnell's offensive production slowed initially. While he registered his first point as a Flyer in the home opener, his first goal (an empty netter) did not come until the 16th game of the season. However, his scoring began to increase around mid-season. On January 8, 2007, in a game against the Atlanta Thrashers, Hartnell scored his 100th career goal. Two days later, Hartnell was credited with his first career natural hat-trick. He scored three goals in a row in a 6–2 victory over the New York Rangers, all against Henrik Lundqvist; The first and third were scored at even strength, while the second came on the power play. He managed yet another hat-trick on January 19, 2008, including the game's winner, and an assist against Rick DiPietro of the New York Islanders.

The 2008–09 season was successful for Hartnell. Playing mostly on the left wing of centre Jeff Carter, he posted a career-high in all offensive categories, scoring 30 goals and 30 assists for 60 points in 82 games. However, Hartnell also led the NHL in minor penalties that season, with 54. The season also saw him score two hat-tricks within nine days of each other; the first came against the Carolina Hurricanes on December 11, 2008, with the second coming against the Washington Capitals on December 20.

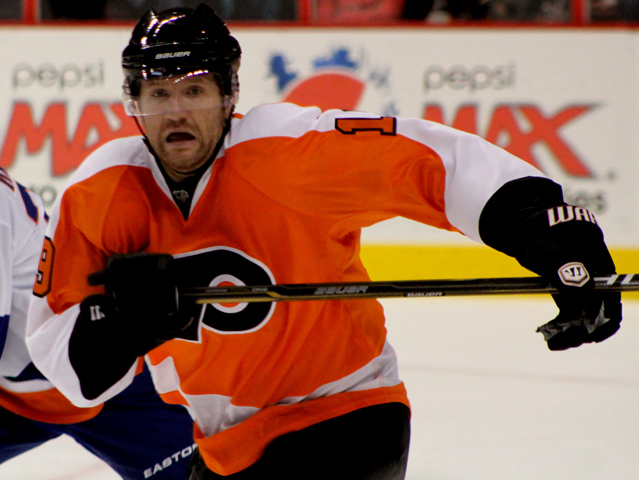
Hartnell with the Philadelphia Flyers.

After a disappointing 2009–10 regular season that saw Hartnell's numbers dip to 44 points (14 goals and 30 assists), Hartnell came alive in the playoffs when placed on a line with Daniel Brière and Ville Leino. This line helped lead the Flyers to their first Stanley Cup Final since 1997. Hartnell played in all 23 games for the Flyers and scored eight goals (including two in game six of the finals) and nine assists, good enough for sixth on the Eastern Conference-winning Flyers with 17 points.

Hartnell continued to produce on a line with Brière and Leino through the 2010–11 season with 24 goals and 25 assists in 82 games. However, the Flyers struggled in the second half of the season and found an early playoff exit. Hartnell himself struggled at the beginning of the following season, with only two points in his first seven games, but would heat up after being placed on a line with Jaromír Jágr and Claude Giroux. On December 13, 2011, Hartnell scored his 200th career goal against Washington Capitals goaltender Tomáš Vokoun, which also was Hartnell's sixth goal in six games.

Hartnell finished the 2011–12 season with a career-high 37 goals. In a late regular season game against Pittsburgh, Hartnell mocked a Penguins fan dressed as Hulk Hogan sitting directly behind the Flyers bench. This caused the Flyers organization to create a special T-shirt with Hartnell's "Hogan" gesture on it, which was given to every fan in attendance for Game 3 of the Eastern Conference Quarterfinals against the same Penguins.

The 2012–13 season proved to be one of the worst seasons Hartnell had experienced in his professional career. After a year in which he scored career highs in goals (37), points (67) and plus-minus rating (+19) and tied a then-career high in assists (30), Hartnell produced just eight goals and three assists for 11 points on the season. He was held scoreless in 25 out of the 32 games he played during the season, while also missing 16 games due to an injury. In addition to his poor scoring, his play caused him to be taken off of his normal line at times, which was centred by Flyers captain Claude Giroux. Moreover, to cap off a disappointing individual season, the Flyers missed out on the year's playoffs.

==== Columbus Blue Jackets ====
On June 23, 2014, Hartnell was traded to the Columbus Blue Jackets in exchange for R. J. Umberger and a fourth-round draft pick. In the 2014–15 season, on November 14, 2014, Hartnell made his return with Columbus to Philadelphia. He enjoyed a productive season with 28 goals and 32 assists in his first year with the Blue Jackets.

After his third season with the Blue Jackets in 2016–17, and having collected 146 points in 234 games with the club, the Blue Jackets in need of additional cap space and aimed towards improving their depth opted to buy out Hartnell from the remaining two years of his contract on June 29, 2017.

==== Return to Nashville ====
On July 1, 2017, Hartnell returned to the Predators, signing a one-year, $1 million contract, reuniting him with former Flyers coach Peter Laviolette. In his return, Hartnell recorded 13 goals and 24 points in 62 games.

On October 1, 2018, Hartnell announced his retirement from professional hockey after seventeen seasons.

== Player profile ==
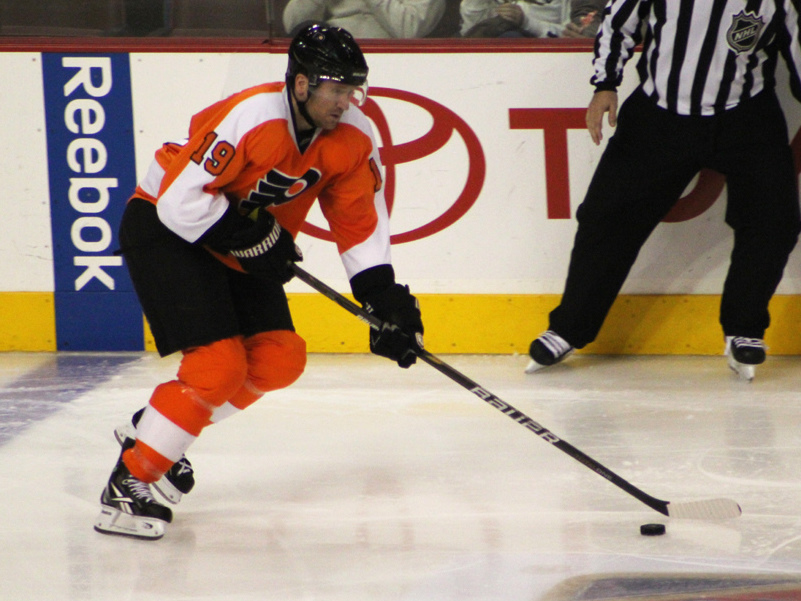
Hartnell during the 2010–11 season.

Hartnell has displayed bizarre on-ice and off-ice behaviour from time to time. He stole the glove off New York Rangers forward Chris Drury during a game on January 31, 2008. Another glove-related incident occurred on December 2, 2008, when Hartnell threw his glove at Tampa Bay Lightning forward Ryan Malone in an attempt to stop a breakaway, resulting in a penalty shot for Malone. Hartnell is also known for his long, bushy hair. On March 26, 2009, the Flyers held "Hartnell Wig Night," where fans attending the game were given wigs resembling his hair. On October 23, 2010, Hartnell revealed he had cut his bushy hair off and donated it to Locks of Love.

In the closing seconds of a game against the Pittsburgh Penguins on October 9, 2009, Hartnell and Penguins defenceman Kris Letang engaged in a scrum, resulting in a two-minute minor penalty for roughing for Hartnell. After the fight, Letang left the ice holding his hand and told the referee that Hartnell had bit him on his hand. The NHL reviewed the broadcast footage of the incident, finding "no clear video evidence" of the biting and opted not to suspend Hartnell for the incident.

A previous Penguins-related incident showcased Hartnell's good nature in an interaction with a Penguins fan taunting him with an orange wig and Flyers number 19 jersey bearing the name "Fartsmell" in a game played in Pittsburgh on March 22, 2009. Hartnell autographed that jersey (signing it "To my biggest fan!! Your bud Scott Fartsmell 19") as well as giving his game-used stick to that fan. Similar to a Gordie Howe hat trick, a Harttrick occurs when a player has a goal, a fight and a fall in a game. During the 2012 Stanley Cup Playoffs, Hartnell was seen mocking a Penguins fan dressed as Hulk Hogan behind the Flyers bench, which drew laughter from the television broadcast team working the game.

== Personal life ==
Hartnell's parents, Bill and Joy Hartnell, are both teachers in Lloydminster, Alberta. His nickname is Bird Dogg. Hartnell is, together with his former Flyers teammates Kimmo Timonen and Sami Kapanen, one of the owners of the Finnish Liiga hockey team KalPa. In 2009, Hartnell was crowned as the NHL Poker Champion, defeating Roberto Luongo in the final of the tournament.

In 2012, Hartnell appeared in the movie This is 40 alongside James van Riemsdyk, Ian Laperrière and Matt Carle.

Hartnell now works as a studio analyst for Flyers games NBC Sports Philadelphia. He occasionally fills in as a color commentator during Flyers broadcasts.

=== Philanthropy ===
In early 2012, Hartnell founded the #HartnellDown Foundation as a way to provide support to charities that support hockey, children and communities around the United States and Canada. It started as a Twitter following to keep track of the number of times Hartnell would fall down during the NHL season. When Hartnell himself joined Twitter, rather than taking offence, he embraced the catchphrase and began to sell merchandise that had it printed on it with the proceeds going to Hartnell's favourite hockey-related charities. At the 2012 NHL All-Star Game, Hartnell donated $1,000 to charity for every "#hartnelldown" mention that was tweeted during the competition.

== Records ==
- Nashville Predators' franchise record for fastest two goals scored by an individual (23 seconds).

== Career statistics ==
=== Regular season and playoffs ===
			Regular season					Playoffs
Season	Team	League	GP	G	A	Pts	PIM	GP	G	A	Pts	PIM
1997–98	Lloydminster Blazers	AJHL	56	9	25	34	82	4	2	1	3	8
1997–98	Prince Albert Raiders	WHL	1	0	1	1	2	—	—	—	—	—
1998–99	Prince Albert Raiders	WHL	65	10	34	44	104	14	0	5	5	22
1999–00	Prince Albert Raiders	WHL	62	27	55	82	124	6	3	2	5	6
2000–01	Nashville Predators	NHL	75	2	14	16	48	—	—	—	—	—
2001–02	Nashville Predators	NHL	75	14	27	41	111	—	—	—	—	—
2002–03	Nashville Predators	NHL	82	12	22	34	101	—	—	—	—	—
2003–04	Nashville Predators	NHL	59	18	15	33	87	6	1	2	3	2
2004–05	Vålerenga	GET	28	17	12	29	103	11	12	7	19	24
2005–06	Nashville Predators	NHL	81	25	23	48	101	5	1	0	1	4
2006–07	Nashville Predators	NHL	64	22	17	39	96	5	1	1	2	28
2007–08	Philadelphia Flyers	NHL	80	24	19	43	159	17	3	4	7	20
2008–09	Philadelphia Flyers	NHL	82	30	30	60	143	6	1	1	2	23
2009–10	Philadelphia Flyers	NHL	81	14	30	44	155	23	8	9	17	25
2010–11	Philadelphia Flyers	NHL	82	24	25	49	142	11	1	3	4	23
2011–12	Philadelphia Flyers	NHL	82	37	30	67	136	11	3	5	8	15
2012–13	Philadelphia Flyers	NHL	32	8	3	11	70	—	—	—	—	—
2013–14	Philadelphia Flyers	NHL	78	20	32	52	103	7	0	3	3	6
2014–15	Columbus Blue Jackets	NHL	77	28	32	60	100	—	—	—	—	—
2015–16	Columbus Blue Jackets	NHL	79	23	26	49	112	—	—	—	—	—
2016–17	Columbus Blue Jackets	NHL	78	13	24	37	63	4	0	0	0	0
2017–18	Nashville Predators	NHL	62	13	11	24	82	4	0	0	0	0
NHL totals			1,249	327	380	707	1,809	99	19	28	47	146

=== International ===
Year	Team	Event	Result	GP	G	A	Pts	PIM
2006	Canada	WC	4th	9	1	0	1	4
Senior totals				9	1	0	1	4

== Awards and honours ==
Award	Year
WHL
CHL Top Prospects Game	2000
NHL
NHL YoungStars Game	2002
All-Star Game	2012
GET
Champion	2005
Playoff MVP	2005

Awards and achievements
Preceded by Brian Finley	Nashville Predators first-round draft pick 2000	Succeeded by Dan Hamhuis
