= Dion Phaneuf =

Canadian ice hockey player (born 1985)

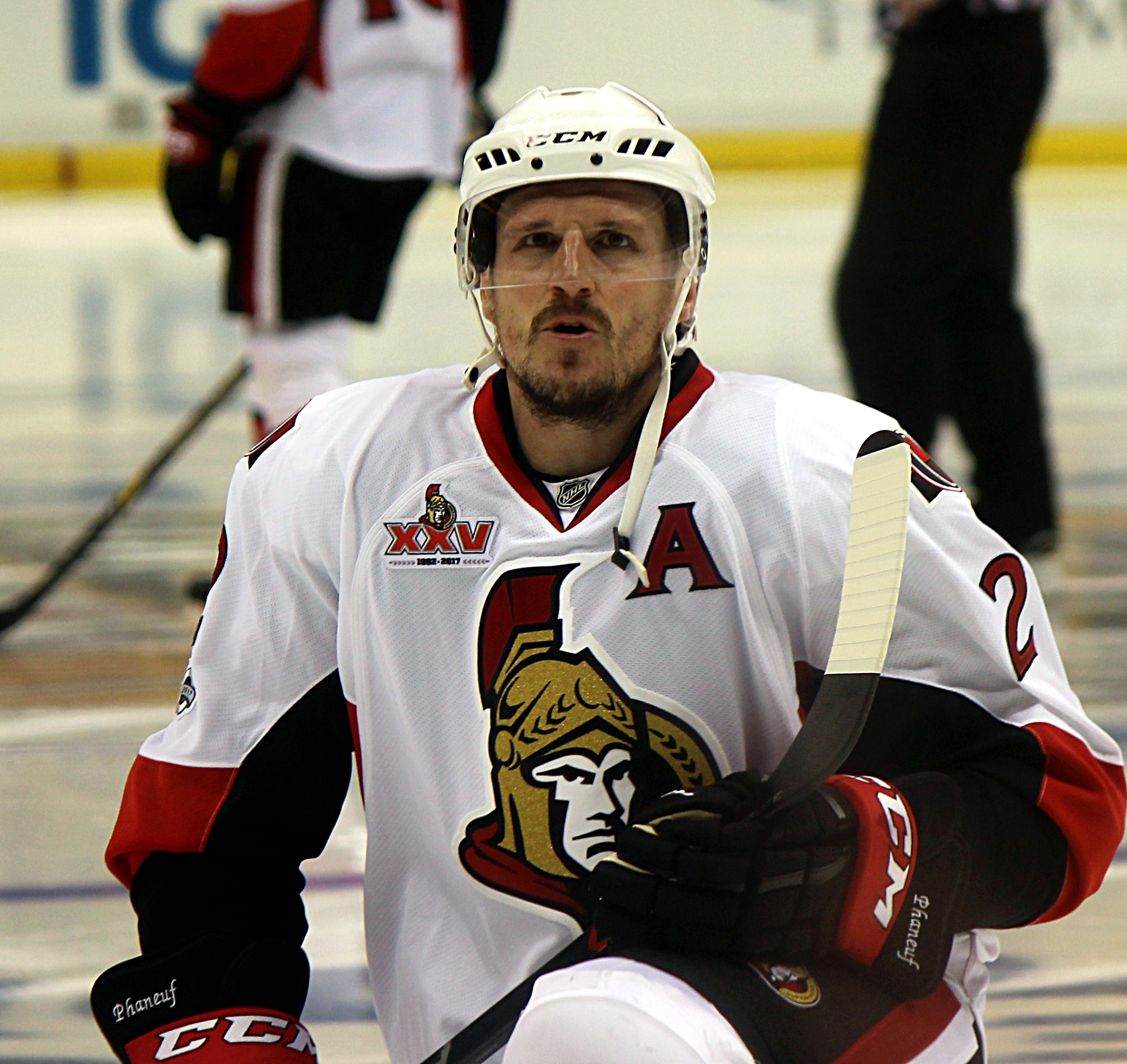
- Phaneuf with the Ottawa Senators in May 2017
- Born: 10 April 1985 (age 41) Edmonton, Alberta, Canada
- Height: 6 ft 4 in (193 cm)
- Weight: 222 lb (101 kg; 15 st 12 lb)
- Position: Defence
- Shot: Left
- Played for: Calgary Flames; Toronto Maple Leafs; Ottawa Senators; Los Angeles Kings
- National team: Canada
- NHL draft: 9th overall, 2003; Calgary Flames
- Playing career: 2005–2019
Medal record
Representing Canada
Ice hockey
World Junior Championships
| Silver medal – second place | 2004 Helsinki |
| Gold medal – first place | 2005 Grand Forks |
World Championships
| Gold medal – first place | 2007 Moscow |

Dion Phaneuf (born 10 April 1985) is a Canadian former professional ice hockey player who was a defenseman for the Calgary Flames, Toronto Maple Leafs, Ottawa Senators and Los Angeles Kings of the National Hockey League (NHL). He was drafted ninth overall in the 2003 NHL entry draft by Calgary and made his NHL debut in 2005 after a four-year junior career with the Red Deer Rebels of the Western Hockey League (WHL), in which he was twice named the Defenceman of the Year.

Phaneuf set a Flames record for most goals by a first-year defenceman and was named a finalist for the Calder Memorial Trophy as top rookie in 2005–06. Two years later, he was a finalist for the James Norris Memorial Trophy as top defenceman. During his career, Phaneuf was involved in two blockbuster trades. The first came in late 2009, when he was involved in a seven-player trade that saw him move from Calgary to Toronto. Six years later, Phaneuf was the centrepiece of a nine-player trade that saw him sent to Ottawa. He was traded to Los Angeles nearing the trade deadline in February 2018.

Phaneuf was a three-time NHL All-Star. He represented Canada internationally five times in his career, winning a silver medal and a gold medal at the World Junior Hockey Championship in 2004 and 2005, respectively, as well as a gold medal at the 2007 Men's World Ice Hockey Championships.

Phaneuf is active in the community; the Flames honoured Phaneuf for his role as an ambassador to the Alberta Children's Hospital, where he participated in events that help sick and injured children during his time in Calgary. Phaneuf was a common sight at Toronto events, often appearing at fundraisers, promotional activities or visiting patients at Sick Kids Hospital.

== Early life ==
Dion Phaneuf was born 10 April 1985, in Edmonton, Alberta, to Paul, a construction worker, and Amber, a nurse, both originally from the province of Prince Edward Island. Dion attended Harry Ainlay Composite High School before Hunting Hills High School while with the Red Deer Rebels. Dion has a younger brother, Dane, who played for the P.E.I. Rocket of the Quebec Major Junior Hockey League (QMJHL). Paul and Amber Phaneuf describe their family as close-knit.

Paul Phaneuf maintained a backyard rink each winter on which the young Phaneuf practiced. His mother, a former figure skater who competed for Prince Edward Island at the 1975 Canada Winter Games, taught him to skate. Phaneuf also practised his shot relentlessly in the basement of his family's home, frequently breaking the nets his father bought. As a youth, he played in the 1998 Quebec International Pee-Wee Hockey Tournament with a minor ice hockey team from Edmonton.

== Playing career ==
=== Junior ===
The Red Deer Rebels selected Phaneuf in the third round of the 2000 WHL Bantam Draft. One year later, he joined the Rebels for the 2001–02 season and recorded 17 points in 67 games. He added two assists in 21 games as the Rebels lost in the WHL Final against the Kootenay Ice. He improved to 30 points in 2002–03 as the Rebels again reached the WHL Finals, again losing, this time to the Kelowna Rockets. Phaneuf's development earned him comparisons to Hall of Famer Scott Stevens, as he was lauded by scouts for his physical style and ability to excel both defensively and offensively. Then-Calgary Flames general manager Darryl Sutter valued Phaneuf so highly in the 2003 NHL entry draft that he attempted to trade up from his ninth overall selection in the draft, though to no avail. Nonetheless, he was able to select Phaneuf with Calgary's first selection in the draft.

Phaneuf established himself as the junior hockey team's top player following the draft, earning the Bill Hunter Memorial Trophy as the top defenceman in the WHL. He was also named an Eastern Conference All-Star by the WHL, and a First Team All-Star by the Canadian Hockey League (CHL). He was considered a candidate to join the Flames in 2004. However, the 2004–05 NHL lockout forced Phaneuf to play one final year of junior hockey. He scored 56 points in 55 games to finish his junior career with 146 total points. He repeated as the WHL's Defenceman of the Year, and was again named to both WHL and CHL All-Star teams. Prospects Hockey rated Phaneuf as the top player in the CHL in both 2004 and 2005, ahead of Sidney Crosby, naming him one of the best junior defencemen of the previous decade.

=== Professional (2005–2019) ===
==== Calgary Flames (2005–2010) ====
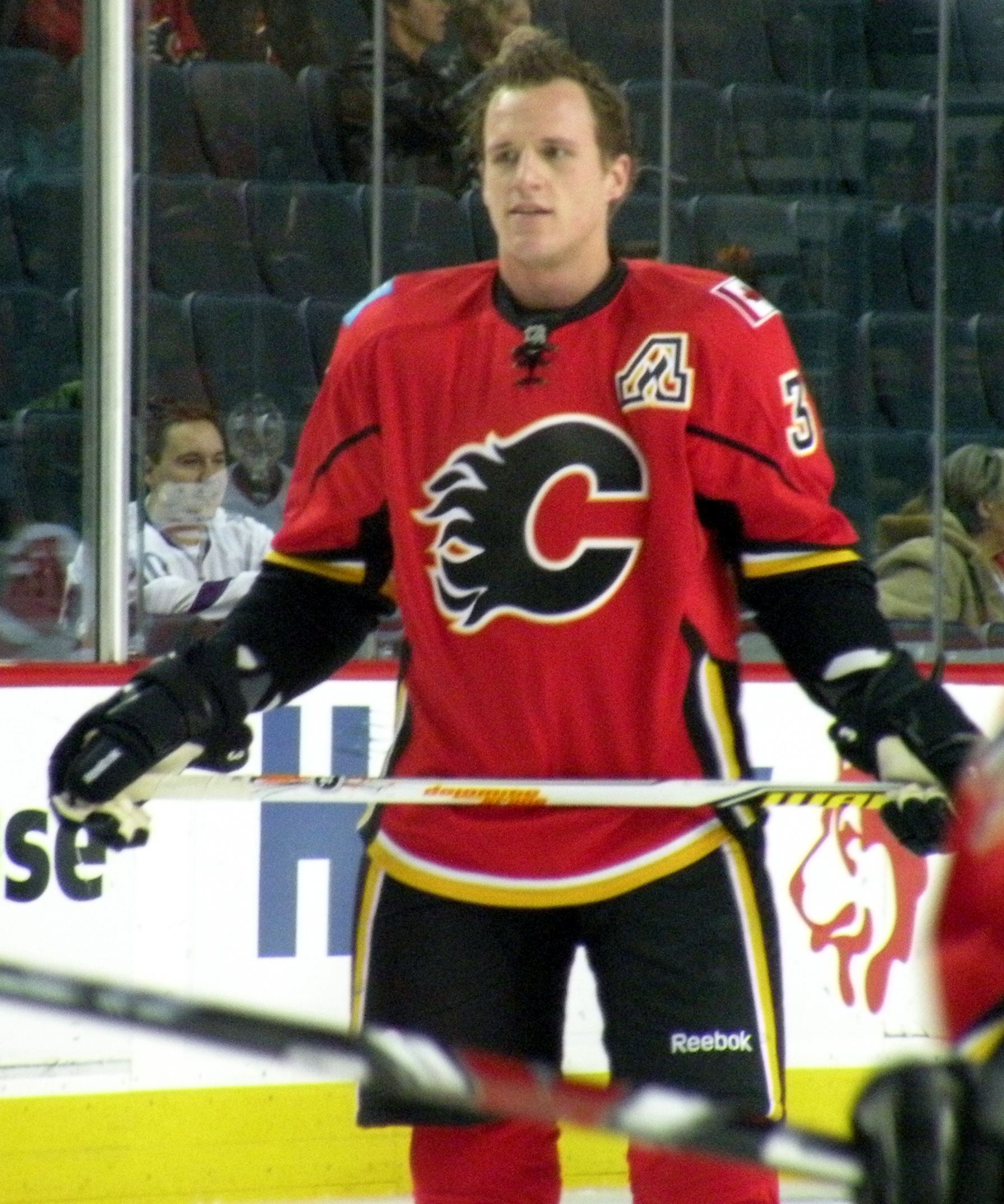
Phaneuf while playing with the Flames in November 2008

Phaneuf joined the Flames for the 2005–06 NHL season after signing his first professional contract in September 2005. He made his NHL debut on 5 October 2005, against the Minnesota Wild. Five nights later, he scored his first career goal and assist against the Colorado Avalanche. He was named the NHL's Rookie of the Month for November after leading all rookie defencemen with nine points and two game-winning goals. By January, Phaneuf was being named alongside Sidney Crosby and Alexander Ovechkin as a candidate for the NHL's top rookie. He finished the season with 20 goals, only the third player in NHL history after Brian Leetch and Barry Beck to score 20 as a rookie defenceman. His 20 goals also broke the Flames franchise record for goals by a rookie defenceman, surpassing Gary Suter's total of 18. Phaneuf was named a finalist for the Calder Memorial Trophy as top rookie, but lost to Ovechkin.

A 50-point sophomore season earned Phaneuf his first NHL All-Star Game appearance in 2006–07. He participated in the hardest shot competition at the SuperSkills competition, losing to Zdeno Chára, and scored a goal and an assist in the game itself to help the Western Conference defeat the East 12–9. The Flames signed Phaneuf to a six-year, US$39 million contract extension midway through the 2007–08 season. He responded by posting a career-high 60 points, and was voted into the starting line-up by the fans for the 2008 All-Star Game. Phaneuf was named to the NHL first All-Star team following the season, and was a finalist for the James Norris Memorial Trophy as defenceman of the year, losing to the Detroit Red Wings' Nicklas Lidström.

The 2008–09 season was a frustrating one for Phaneuf, as he recorded a career-low 11 goals and 47 points, and his poor plus-minus rating of –11 led fans to question his defensive commitment. His poor season and high salary also led to speculation that Phaneuf might be traded. Despite his struggles, Phaneuf averaged 26 minutes and 31 seconds of ice time per game, the fourth highest in the NHL. He missed the final game of the Flames' 2009 Stanley Cup playoff Western Quarter-final series against the Chicago Blackhawks with broken ribs, after battling a hip injury during the regular season. Flames management defended Phaneuf, claiming the injuries he battled affected his play.

==== Toronto Maple Leafs (2010–2016) ====
On 31 January 2010, the Flames dealt Phaneuf, along with Fredrik Sjöström and Keith Aulie, to the Toronto Maple Leafs in exchange for Matt Stajan, Niklas Hagman, Ian White and Jamal Mayers.

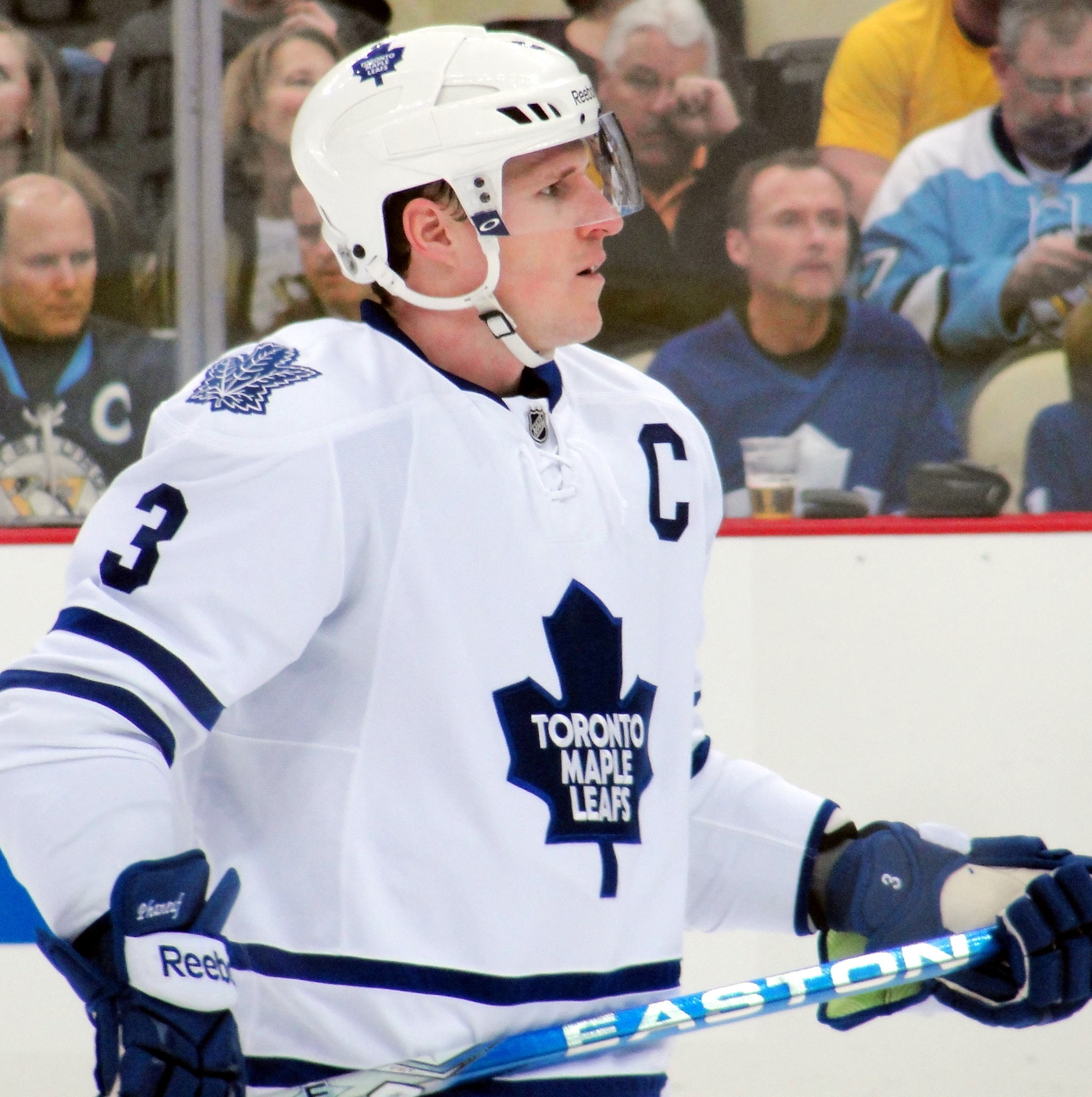
Phaneuf in March 2012. He was the Maple Leafs' team captain from 2010 to 2016.

On 2 February 2010, Phaneuf made his Toronto Maple Leaf debut, leading all Maple Leafs players in time on ice and ended the night with a fight and given second star of the game honours. He would record his first point, an assist, four nights later in a game against the Ottawa Senators and scored his first goal as a Leaf on 7 April 2010, on Henrik Lundqvist of the New York Rangers. Phaneuf was named an alternate captain in Toronto nine games after being acquired after Mike Komisarek suffered a season-ending injury. While Phaneuf struggled offensively to begin his tenure in Toronto – he played 25 games in Toronto before scoring his first goal – then-Leafs head coach Ron Wilson credited him with creating a positive change in the mood in the Toronto dressing room.

Phaneuf was named the 18th captain of the Toronto Maple Leafs on 14 June 2010, at a press conference held by general manager Brian Burke, succeeding Mats Sundin, who left after the 2007–08 season.

On 2 November 2010, in a game against the Ottawa Senators, Phaneuf sustained an injury in the leg by having it cut open with a skate from Peter Regin while crashing into the boards. He was carried off the ice immediately and had surgery done the same night. Phaneuf was said to be off the ice for four-to-six weeks, and made a return to the Leafs' line-up on 9 December 2010, a home ice game against the Philadelphia Flyers, which Philadelphia won 4–1, though he had one assist on the lone Toronto goal.

On 5 January 2012, it was announced that Phaneuf would compete in his third All-Star Game, having finished second amongst all defencemen on the fan ballot, gaining 614,933 votes, behind the Ottawa Senators' Erik Karlsson. On 21 April 2013, Phaneuf and the Leafs clinched a Stanley Cup playoff spot, the first time for Phaneuf since the 2008–09 season with the Calgary Flames. On 10 December 2013, Phaneuf received a two-game suspension on a boarding hit on Boston Bruins defenceman Kevan Miller, which occurred on 8 December 2013, in Toronto. Phaneuf forfeited the amount of US$66,666.66 for his action.

The Maple Leafs, struggling once again, decided to start a rebuild in early 2015. Thus Phaneuf, a veteran defenceman with a lengthy contract, began being shopped around. On 2 March 2015, Phaneuf was almost traded to the Detroit Red Wings, however the deal fell through at the last minute when Toronto refused to retain a large portion of Phaneuf's salary. He would play the rest of the year in Toronto. When Toronto hired head coach Mike Babcock the following season, Phaneuf excelled, experiencing fewer penalty minutes and better defensive play under his reduced minutes.

==== Ottawa Senators (2016–2018) ====
After parts of seven seasons with Toronto, Phaneuf was traded to the Ottawa Senators on 9 February 2016, in a blockbuster nine-player trade. Both fans and media alike viewed the trade with shock, as a significant deal between the arch-rivals was viewed as very unlikely to happen. Phaneuf, Matt Frattin, prospects Casey Bailey, Ryan Rupert and Cody Donaghey were sent to the Senators in exchange for Jared Cowen, Colin Greening, Milan Michalek, prospect Tobias Lindberg and Ottawa's 2017 second-round draft pick. Due to the Battle of Ontario rivalry, this was the first time the Maple Leafs and Senators had made a trade since 17 March 1998, when Per Gustafsson was sent to Ottawa in exchange for an eighth-round pick. As his usual jersey number 3 was already in use on the team by Marc Methot, Phaneuf took up jersey number 2. Phaneuf played a shortened 2015–16 season due to an "oblique injury and soreness in his right foot" after blocking a shot during a game against the Maple Leafs on March 12, ending the season with 20 games played with the Senators, amassing one goal and eight points.

Phaneuf was named an alternate captain of the Senators at the beginning of the 2016–17 season. Phaneuf scored the overtime winner in game two of the Senators' first-round playoff series against the Boston Bruins in the 2017 Stanley Cup Playoffs. The team would be eliminated in the seventh game, double-overtime of the Eastern Conference final by the Pittsburgh Penguins.

In the following off-season, Phaneuf was asked by the Senators to waive his no-move clause in his contract for the 2017 NHL expansion draft. He declined and the Senators had to place Phaneuf on its protected list for the draft.

In the following season, the Senators stumbled out of the gate. This was later attributed to dissension in the dressing room. After a trade to bring Matt Duchene to Ottawa was followed by poor performances, the team's management started dismantling the team to rebuild. On 13 February 2018, Phaneuf and Nate Thompson were traded to the Los Angeles Kings in exchange for forwards Marian Gaborik and Nick Shore. To complete the deal, Phaneuf had to allow a trade to the Kings under the no-move clause in his contract. As part of the deal, the Senators retained 25% of the remainder of Phaneuf's contract.

==== Los Angeles Kings and retirement (2018–2019) ====
During the 2018–19 season, Phaneuf played in his 1,000th career game on 17 November 2018 in a 5-3 loss to the Nashville Predators. He finished his second season with the Kings recording a career-low one goal and six points and a plus-minus of -21 through 67 games. On 15 June 2019, the Kings bought out the final two years of Phaneuf's contract, making him an unrestricted free agent.

On 16 November 2021, Phaneuf announced his retirement from professional ice hockey, over two years after his final game in the NHL. He had spent parts of the previous two seasons job-shadowing with Maple Leafs president Brendan Shanahan. The Maple Leafs honoured Phaneuf later that day in a ceremony ahead of their game against the Nashville Predators.

== International play ==
Phaneuf made his international debut for the Canadian junior team at the 2004 World Junior Ice Hockey Championships in Helsinki, earning a leadership role under Head Coach Mario Durocher. A devastating bodycheck to the Czech Republic's Rostislav Olesz led the referee to eject Phaneuf from the semi-final game; he was not suspended, however, and played in the gold medal game. The Canadians lost the final to the United States, while Phaneuf was named a tournament All-Star at defence.

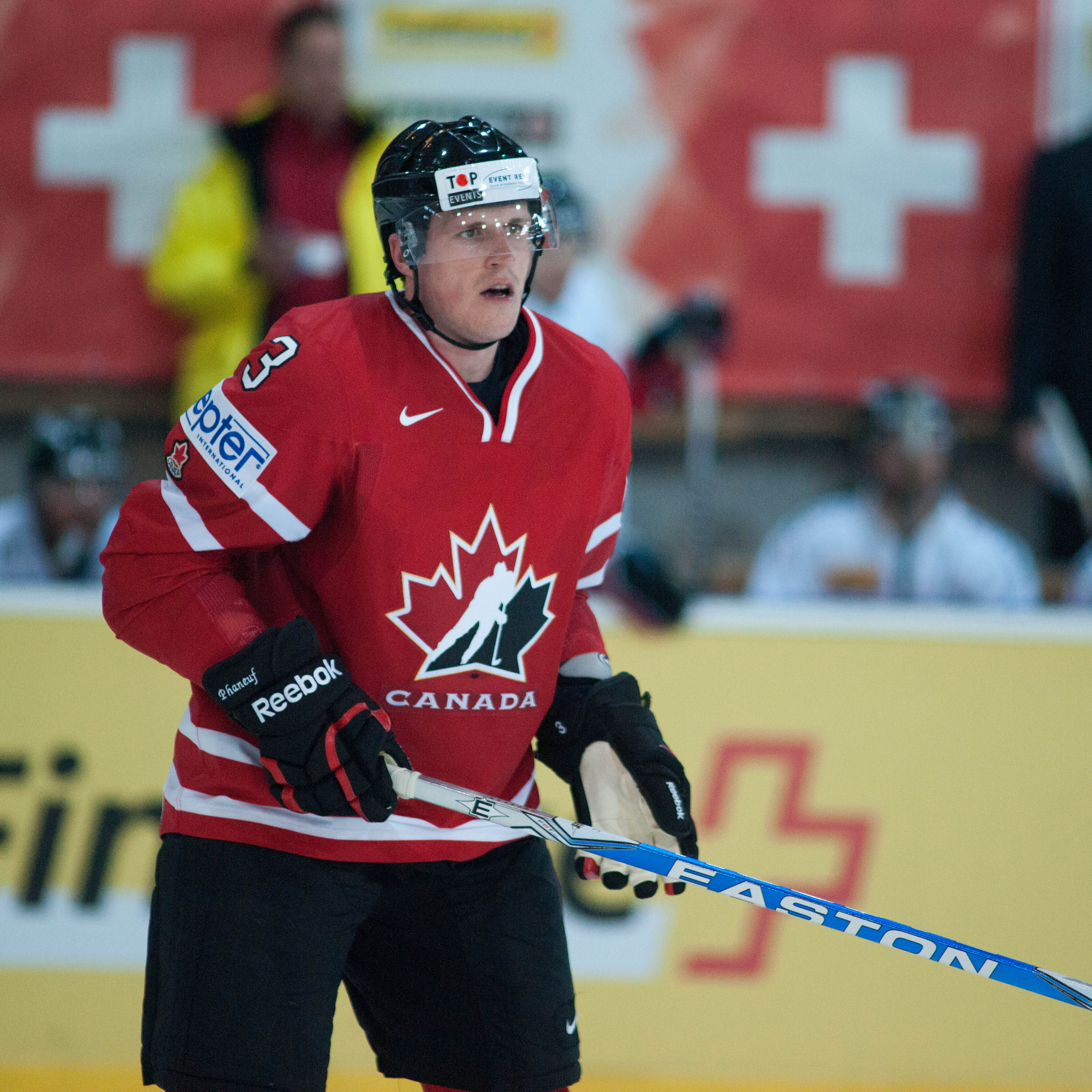
Phaneuf representing Canada at the 2012 IIHF World Championship

The Canadian team at the 2005 World Junior Ice Hockey Championships dominated the tournament, outscoring their opposition 35–6 in the games leading up to the gold medal game with Russia. Phaneuf scored a goal and threw a memorable bodycheck that knocked down two Russian players in the game as Canada routed the Russians 6–1 to win their first gold medal in eight years. He was again named a tournament All-Star, as well as being named the outstanding defenceman of the tournament.

Following the Flames' elimination in the 2007 Stanley Cup playoffs, Phaneuf joined the Canadian senior team at the 2007 Men's World Ice Hockey Championships in Moscow. He recorded eight assists in seven games to help Canada win the gold medal over Finland. Once considered a virtual lock to join Canada at the 2010 Winter Olympics, his struggles in the 2008–09 season placed his candidacy in doubt. Team Canada general manager Steve Yzerman continued to express confidence in Phaneuf during a summer camp held in Calgary, but Phaneuf was not among the seven defencemen ultimately selected for the team.

After the Maple Leafs missed the 2011 playoffs, Phaneuf served as alternate captain of Canada at the 2011 IIHF World Championship in Bratislava, Slovakia, where Canada finished fifth. Phaneuf was once again alternate captain of the Canadian team at the 2012 World Championship in Helsinki and Stockholm. Canada repeated its fifth-place finish of the prior year.

In August 2013, Phaneuf attended the summer orientation camp for Canada in preparation for the 2014 Winter Olympics. However, Phaneuf was not named to the final roster.

== Playing style ==
In junior hockey, Phaneuf was known not only for his physical presence, but also his calm demeanour and offensive ability. He was compared to Hockey Hall of Famer Scott Stevens by his former coach, Brent Sutter. Scouts praised his defensive ability, and the poise he showed at both ends of the ice. Praised for his leadership abilities, Phaneuf was named the captain of Team WHL at the 2004 ATD Canada-Russia Challenge, and was counted upon to take a leadership role with the Canadian junior team at the 2004 and 2005 World Junior Championships.

Entering his sophomore season, Phaneuf's potential impact on a game was compared to that of Russian star Alexander Ovechkin, and a poll released by ESPN in 2008 revealed that 43% of players asked argued Phaneuf was the hardest hitter in hockey, at the age of 22. He was named an alternate captain by the Flames at the start of the 2008–09 season, though Brent Sutter chose to alternate amongst a group of veterans, including Phaneuf, in 2009–10.

While Phaneuf earned a James Norris Memorial Trophy nomination for his defensive play in 2008, he struggled enough during the 2008–09 season that some observers began to question his defensive commitment. Phaneuf's teammates were quick to defend his play and noted that he was among the League leaders in average time on ice per game. His hitting game has also earned criticism at times. The New York Islanders were especially upset at an open-ice charge Phaneuf delivered to Kyle Okposo during a 2009 exhibition game that resulted in the latter suffering a concussion. Phaneuf has also been criticized for occasionally refusing to fight opponents who challenge him after throwing a big hit. For his part, Phaneuf said he does not believe he should be forced to fight after every big hit, though he would do so when necessary. His coaches have praised Phaneuf's mentality. He has also been accused of playing "dirty" and "stupid" by opponents who feel that he occasionally takes unnecessary liberties with opposing players. A 2010 Sports Illustrated poll of 229 NHL players saw 21% of respondents name Phaneuf as the most over-rated player in the NHL, three times as many votes as any other player. Phaneuf dismissed the poll while several of his current and former teammates expressed their disagreement with the result.

== Post-hockey career ==
On February 23, 2022 it was announced that Phaneuf had taken a role with the CBD and vitamin supplements company, CaniBrands, as the company's Strategic Advisor.

== Personal life ==
Phaneuf began dating Canadian actress Elisha Cuthbert in May 2008. Their relationship became the centre of controversy in December 2008 when then-Dallas Stars forward Sean Avery, who had dated Cuthbert in the past, commented on how other NHL players, such as Phaneuf—as well as Los Angeles Kings' centre Jarret Stoll, who was dating model Rachel Hunter, another ex-girlfriend—fell in love with his "sloppy seconds". NHL Commissioner Gary Bettman referred to the remarks as "disgusting" and subsequently suspended Avery six games. The Stars later cut ties with Avery permanently.

Phaneuf and Cuthbert announced their engagement in September 2012, and they married on 6 July 2013 at St. James Catholic Church in Summerfield, Prince Edward Island. As of 2013, he was living in Toronto during the hockey season, Phaneuf and Cuthbert spend their summers at Phaneuf's waterfront estate outside of New London, Prince Edward Island, in his parents' home province. Cuthbert gave birth to a daughter in 2017 and a son in 2022. As of November 2021, Phaneuf and his family had moved to Los Angeles.

While with the Flames, he was the official ambassador to the Alberta Children's Hospital in Calgary and donated tickets to Flames games to help families at the facility. The Flames named him the recipient of the Ralph T. Scurfield Humanitarian Award in 2008 in recognition of his participation with the Children's Hospital. Phaneuf has appeared on the cover of the NHL 09 video game, and played a role in NHL promotions and commercials.

Phaneuf is a fourth cousin of Canadian figure skater Cynthia Phaneuf.

== Career statistics ==
=== Regular season and playoffs ===
| | | | Regular season | | | | | Playoffs |
| Season | Team | League | GP | G | A | Pts | PIM | GP | G | A | Pts | PIM |
|---|---|---|---|---|---|---|---|---|---|---|---|---|
| 2001–02 | Red Deer Rebels | WHL | 67 | 5 | 12 | 17 | 170 | 21 | 0 | 2 | 2 | 14 |
| 2002–03 | Red Deer Rebels | WHL | 71 | 16 | 14 | 30 | 185 | 23 | 7 | 7 | 14 | 34 |
| 2003–04 | Red Deer Rebels | WHL | 62 | 19 | 24 | 43 | 126 | 19 | 2 | 9 | 11 | 30 |
| 2004–05 | Red Deer Rebels | WHL | 55 | 24 | 32 | 56 | 73 | 7 | 1 | 4 | 5 | 12 |
| 2005–06 | Calgary Flames | NHL | 82 | 20 | 29 | 49 | 93 | 7 | 1 | 0 | 1 | 7 |
| 2006–07 | Calgary Flames | NHL | 79 | 17 | 33 | 50 | 98 | 6 | 1 | 0 | 1 | 7 |
| 2007–08 | Calgary Flames | NHL | 82 | 17 | 43 | 60 | 182 | 7 | 3 | 4 | 7 | 4 |
| 2008–09 | Calgary Flames | NHL | 80 | 11 | 36 | 47 | 100 | 5 | 0 | 3 | 3 | 4 |
| 2009–10 | Calgary Flames | NHL | 55 | 10 | 12 | 22 | 49 | — | — | — | — | — |
| 2009–10 | Toronto Maple Leafs | NHL | 26 | 2 | 8 | 10 | 34 | — | — | — | — | — |
| 2010–11 | Toronto Maple Leafs | NHL | 66 | 8 | 22 | 30 | 88 | — | — | — | — | — |
| 2011–12 | Toronto Maple Leafs | NHL | 82 | 12 | 32 | 44 | 92 | — | — | — | — | — |
| 2012–13 | Toronto Maple Leafs | NHL | 48 | 9 | 19 | 28 | 65 | 7 | 1 | 2 | 3 | 6 |
| 2013–14 | Toronto Maple Leafs | NHL | 80 | 8 | 23 | 31 | 144 | — | — | — | — | — |
| 2014–15 | Toronto Maple Leafs | NHL | 70 | 3 | 26 | 29 | 108 | — | — | — | — | — |
| 2015–16 | Toronto Maple Leafs | NHL | 51 | 3 | 21 | 24 | 67 | — | — | — | — | — |
| 2015–16 | Ottawa Senators | NHL | 20 | 1 | 7 | 8 | 23 | — | — | — | — | — |
| 2016–17 | Ottawa Senators | NHL | 81 | 9 | 21 | 30 | 100 | 19 | 1 | 4 | 5 | 17 |
| 2017–18 | Ottawa Senators | NHL | 53 | 3 | 13 | 16 | 34 | — | — | — | — | — |
| 2017–18 | Los Angeles Kings | NHL | 26 | 3 | 7 | 10 | 15 | 4 | 0 | 1 | 1 | 4 |
| 2018–19 | Los Angeles Kings | NHL | 67 | 1 | 5 | 6 | 53 | — | — | — | — | — |
| NHL totals | | | 1,048 | 137 | 357 | 494 | 1,345 | 55 | 7 | 14 | 21 | 49 |

=== International ===
| Year | Team | Event | Result | GP | G | A | Pts | PIM |
|---|---|---|---|---|---|---|---|---|
| 2002 | Canada Pacific | WHC17 | 2nd place, silver medalist(s) | 6 | 3 | 5 | 8 | 8 |
| 2004 | Canada | WJC | 2nd place, silver medalist(s) | 6 | 2 | 2 | 4 | 29 |
| 2005 | Canada | WJC | 1st place, gold medalist(s) | 6 | 1 | 5 | 6 | 14 |
| 2007 | Canada | WC | 1st place, gold medalist(s) | 7 | 0 | 8 | 8 | 2 |
| 2011 | Canada | WC | 5th | 7 | 0 | 3 | 3 | 8 |
| 2012 | Canada | WC | 5th | 8 | 2 | 0 | 2 | 4 |
| Junior totals | | | | 18 | 6 | 12 | 18 | 51 |
| Senior totals | | | | 22 | 2 | 11 | 13 | 14 |

=== All-Star Games ===
| Year | Location | G | A | P |
|---|---|---|---|---|
| 2007 | Dallas | 1 | 1 | 2 |
| 2008 | Atlanta | 1 | 0 | 1 |
| 2012 | Ottawa | 0 | 0 | 0 |
| All-Star totals | | 2 | 1 | 3 |

== Awards and honours ==
| Award | Year | Ref |
NHL
| NHL All-Rookie Team | 2005–06 | |
| NHL All-Star Game | 2007, 2008, 2012 | |
| NHL First All-Star Team | 2008 | |
| Elimination Shootout winner | 2008 | |
| EA Sports NHL cover athlete | 2009 | |
Calgary Flames
| Ralph T. Scurfield Humanitarian Award | 2007–08 | |
Junior
| WHL Eastern Conference first All-Star team | 2003–04; 2004–05 | |
| CHL first All-Star team | 2003–04 | |
| Bill Hunter Memorial Trophy | 2003–04; 2004–05 | |
International
| World Junior All-Star team | 2004; 2005 | |
| World Junior Directorate Award for Best Defenceman | 2005 | |

Awards and achievements
| Preceded by Eric Nystrom | Calgary Flames' first-round draft pick 2003 | Succeeded by Kris Chucko |
| Preceded by Jeff Woywitka | Winner of the Bill Hunter Memorial Trophy; 2004, 2005 | Succeeded by Kris Russell |
Sporting positions
| Preceded by Mats Sundin | Toronto Maple Leafs captain 2010–2016 | Succeeded by John Tavares |
