= Marián Gáborík =

Slovak ice hockey player (born 1982)

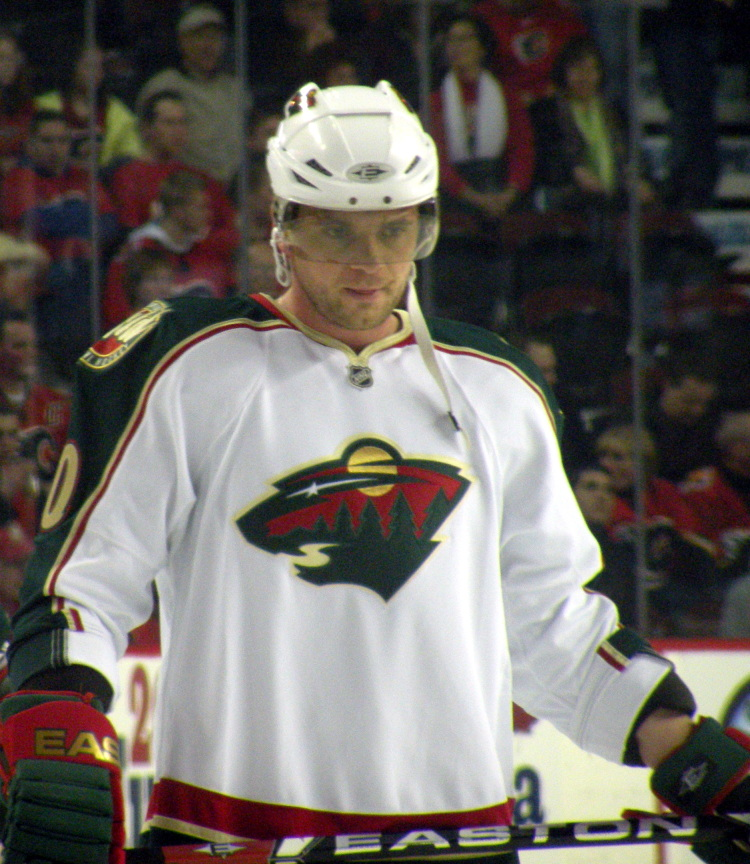
- Gáborík with the Minnesota Wild in March 2009
- Born: 14 February 1982 (age 44) Trenčín, Czechoslovakia
- Height: 6 ft 1 in (185 cm)
- Weight: 201 lb (91 kg; 14 st 5 lb)
- Position: Left wing
- Shot: Left
- Played for: Dukla Trenčín; Minnesota Wild; Färjestad BK; New York Rangers; Columbus Blue Jackets; Los Angeles Kings; Ottawa Senators
- National team: Slovakia
- NHL draft: 3rd overall, 2000; Minnesota Wild
- Playing career: 1998–2018

Marián Gáborík (Slovak pronunciation: [ˈmarijaːŋ ˈɡaːbɔriːk]; born 14 February 1982) is a Slovak former professional ice hockey right winger. He began his playing career in the Slovak Extraliga with Dukla Trenčín for two seasons before being drafted third overall in the 2000 NHL entry draft by the Minnesota Wild, becoming the highest-drafted Slovak player in National Hockey League (NHL) history until Juraj Slafkovský, who was drafted 1st overall by the Montreal Canadiens in 2022. Gáborík was the Wild's first-ever draft pick and would score the team's first-ever regular season goal.

Gáborík spent eight seasons with the Wild from 2000 to 2009, becoming the team's all-time leading goal scorer, before signing with the New York Rangers in 2009. He has also played for the Columbus Blue Jackets, Los Angeles Kings, and Ottawa Senators in the NHL until retiring in 2018. Gáborík won the Stanley Cup with the Kings, defeating his former team, the Rangers, in the 2014 Stanley Cup Final.

Internationally, Gáborík was a two-time Olympian with Slovakia and won a bronze medal at the 1999 World Junior Championships.

== Playing career ==
=== Dukla Trenčín (1998–2000) ===
Gáborík played with Dukla Trenčín's junior team and scored 59 points over 36 games in 1997–98. That same season, he appeared in one Slovak Extraliga game with Dukla Trenčín's men's team, scoring a goal in his professional debut. The following season, in 1998–99, he joined Dukla Trenčín in the Slovak Extraliga full-time and registered 20 points over 33 games as a rookie. Gáborík then improved to 46 points in 50 games the following season in his draft year.

=== Professional ===
==== Minnesota Wild (2000–2009) ====
Gáborík was the first-ever draft pick for the expansion Minnesota Wild, drafted with the third overall pick in the first round of the 2000 NHL entry draft after Rick DiPietro and Dany Heatley. Gáborík immediately showed promise during his rookie season with the Wild, scoring the team's first ever regular season goal en route to collecting 18 goals and 36 points for the expansion Wild. He elevated his game the following season, in 2001–02, notching his first 30-goal season and nearly doubling his rookie output to 67 points. He also recorded his first career NHL hat-trick near the beginning of the season on 13 November 2001. In 2002–03, Gáborík was named to his first NHL All-Star Game and won the fastest skater competition, lapping the rink in 13.713 seconds. He notched 30 goals for the second consecutive season, but more importantly helped lead the Wild to their first Stanley Cup playoffs appearance. He capped off his third NHL season with 17 points in 18 games as part of a run to the Western Conference Finals.

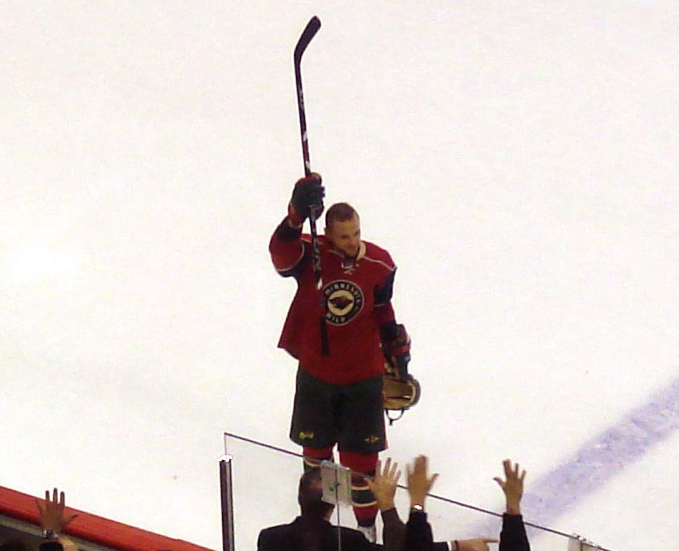
Gáborík saluting the crowd following his five-goal game against the Rangers in December 2007.

Contractual issues kept Gáborík from starting the 2003–04 season with the Wild, as his initial entry-level contract came to an end in the off-season. Holding out with Dukla Trenčín, his agent, Allan Walsh, asserted that Gáborík would not take less than $6.5 million a year. After switching agents three times, Gáborík eventually agreed to a three-year, $10 million contract with the Wild on 31 October 2003. Limited to 65 games that season, he recorded 18 goals and 40 points. Due to the 2004–05 NHL lockout, Gáborík again returned to Dukla Trenčín, where he dominated with 52 points in 29 games. He also saw time with Färjestad BK of the Swedish Elitserien.

As NHL play resumed in 2005–06, Gáborík took another step forward, becoming a point-per-game player with 38 goals and 66 points in a 65-game season limited by a groin injury. His season was shortened once more the following season in 2006–07, re-injuring his groin on 20 October 2006, against the Anaheim Ducks. Despite a 10- to 14-day estimated recovery time, he did not return to the lineup until 6 January 2007, against the Colorado Avalanche 2 1/2 months later. Although Gáborík missed 34 games, he still managed a second consecutive 30-goal season to go with 57 points overall.

On 20 December 2007, Gáborík recorded a six-point game against the New York Rangers with five goals and an assist. This made him the first player in Wild history to score five goals in a game, as well as the first NHLer since Sergei Fedorov of the Detroit Red Wings did so, 11 years earlier (on 26 December 1996, against the Washington Capitals). At mid-season, he was chosen to his second NHL All-Star Game and would go on to record personal bests of 42 goals, 41 assists and 83 points. Gáborík finished his career year as team captain for the Wild in March 2008. It was the first time in his career he was chosen as part of the team's monthly rotating captaincy. Entering the final year of his contract with the Wild in 2008–09, the Wild began negotiations early to re-sign Gáborík. A ten-year, $80 million deal was turned down by Gáborík, and the Wild consequently began entertaining trade offers from NHL teams. His playing time with the Wild was limited in his final year after being sidelined early in the season with a lower-body injury before undergoing hip surgery in January 2009. He returned to the lineup on 21 March 2009, against the Edmonton Oilers and finished the season with 23 points in 17 games.

Gáborík was unable to sign a new contract with the Wild in the 2009 off-season. He left the Wild after eight seasons as its last original player and as the club's all-time leader in goals, assists and points, all of which have since been surpassed by Mikko Koivu.

==== New York Rangers (2009–2013) ====
Leading up to the free agency period, Gáborík was speculated to have interest in signing with the Vancouver Canucks after The Province reported he had recently bought a home in West Vancouver in the 2009 off-season. Nevertheless, Gáborík signed as an unrestricted free agent with the New York Rangers on the first day of free agency on 1 July 2009. The Rangers signed him to a reported $37.5 million contract over five years.

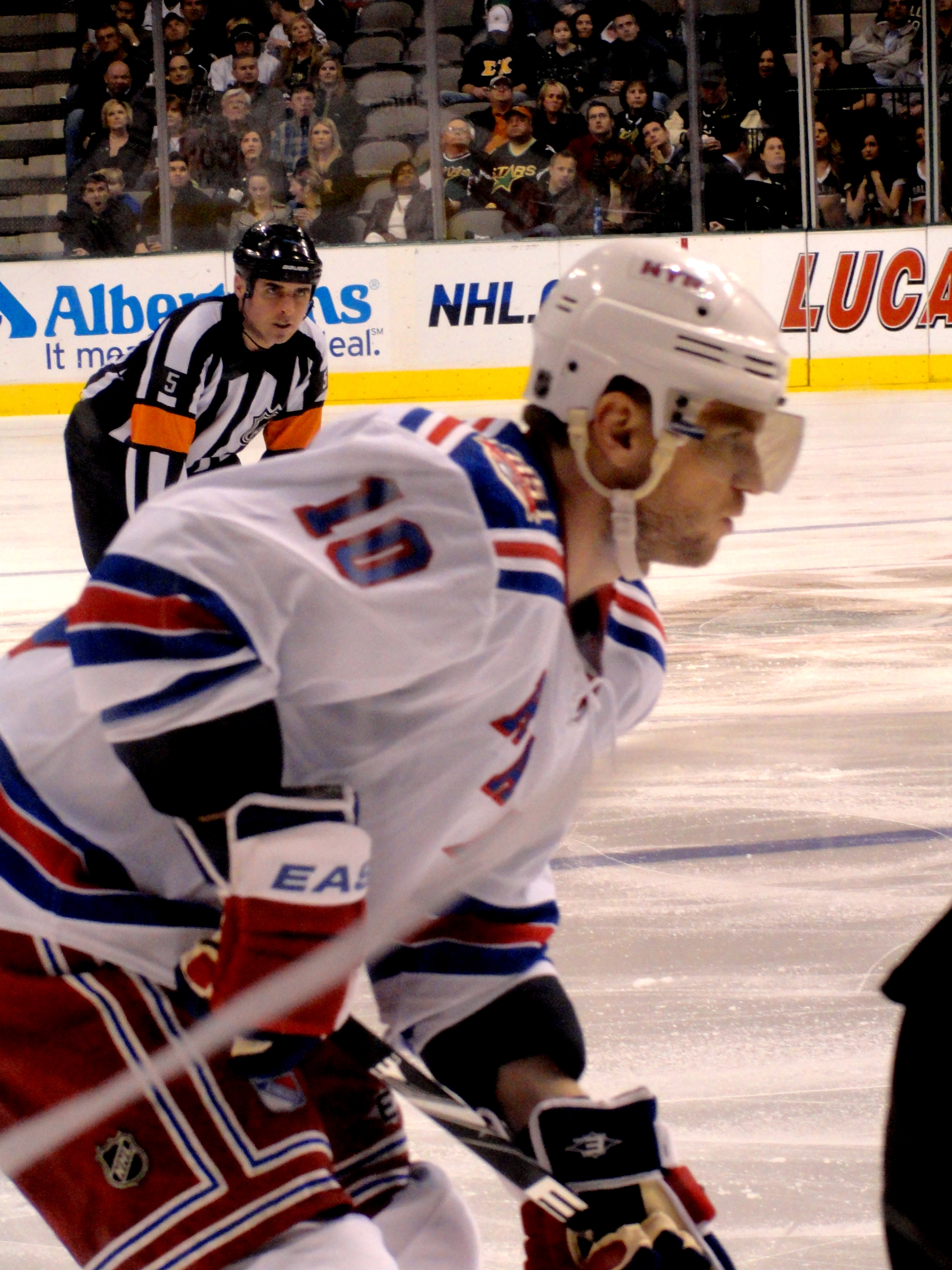
Gáborík with the Rangers in January 2011

Gáborík got off to a quick start with his new club, scoring 10 goals in his first 12 games. Nearly a month into the season, he suffered a knee injury after colliding with former Ranger Petr Průcha in a game against the Phoenix Coyotes on 26 October 2009. He missed two games, including what would have been his first game back in Minnesota against the Wild. Gáborík was injured for a second time in the season when his right leg was cut by team goaltender Henrik Lundqvist during a team practice on 9 February 2010. Though the Rangers finished ninth in the East and missed the 2010 playoffs by one point, Gáborík did not disappoint in his first season with the team; he played in 76 games, matching his career high with 42 goals, and 44 assists for a new career high in points with 86. He led the Rangers in all three categories and his 42 goals ranked fifth in the NHL overall (only behind Patrick Marleau, Alexander Ovechkin and the league leader(s) Sidney Crosby and Steven Stamkos, respectively. His 86 points ranked 10th overall in the league.

Gáborík's second season with the Rangers, in 2010–11, was hampered by injury. Just three games into the season, he suffered a shoulder injury after receiving an illegal boarding hit in a game against the Toronto Maple Leafs. The injury caused him to miss nearly a month, and, upon his return, limited his playing style, which relies on his tremendous wrist shot. Perhaps due to lingering effects from his various ailments, Gáborík proved a streaky scorer throughout the season and finished with 22 goals and 26 assists in 62 games, though 12 of those goals came in four games. His best game of the season was on 19 January 2011, when Gáborík scored four goals and an assist in a 7–0 win over the Toronto Maple Leafs. For the first time since Gáborík had joined the team, the Rangers narrowly returned to the Stanley Cup playoffs as the eighth seed with a 5–2 win over the rival New Jersey Devils in the final game of the season. Gáborík contributed an assist on the game-winning goal, and a plus-minus rating of +2 during the game. In the first round of the 2011 playoffs against the top-seeded Washington Capitals, the Rangers were defeated in five games. Gáborík ended the series with a goal and an assist for two points in all five contests played.

On 29 January 2012, Gáborík was named the MVP of the 59th NHL All-Star Game in Ottawa. He ended the 2011–12 campaign playing in all 82 contests recorded with 41 goals and 35 assists for 76 points, leading the team in goals and points finishing second on the team in assists. The Rangers as a team finished as the top seed in the Eastern Conference and the Presidents’ Trophy runner-up only behind the Vancouver Canucks. His 41 goals also ranked third in the NHL overall behind Evgeni Malkin’s 50 goals and the league-leading 60 goals by Steven Stamkos, respectively. On 3 May, shortly after midnight, Gáborík scored a triple-overtime game winner against the Washington Capitals in game 3 of the Eastern Conference Semifinals, giving the Rangers a 2-1 lead in the series, whilst ending one of the longest playoff games in Rangers history. Gáborík and the top-seeded Rangers defeated the seventh-seeded Capitals in seven games before falling in six games in the Eastern Conference Final to the New Jersey Devils. He ended the 2012 playoffs with five goals and six assists for 11 points in all 20 games.

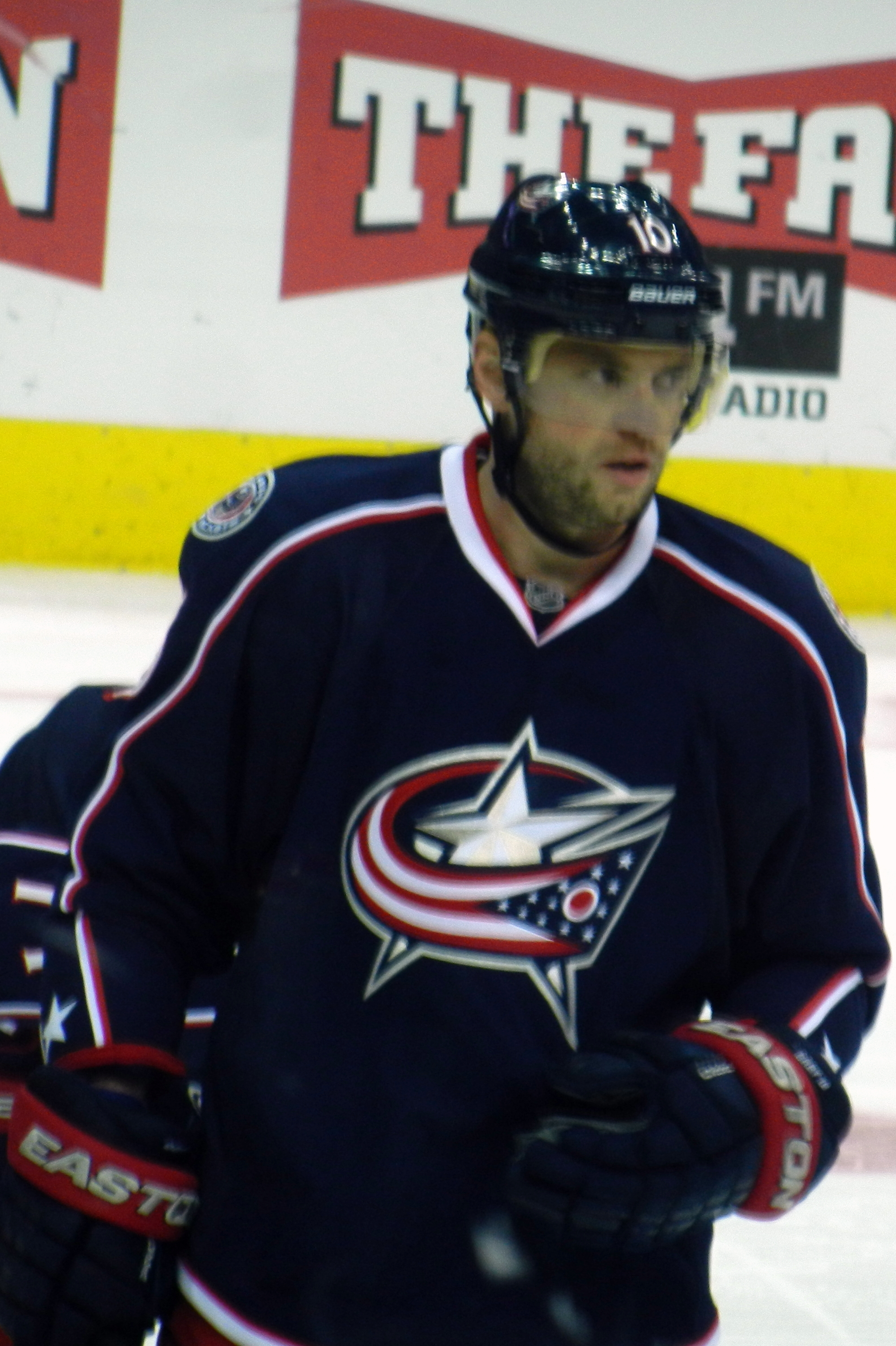
Gáborík with the Blue Jackets in October 2013

On the commencement of the lockout-shortened 2012–13 season, Gáborík, who remained idle during the labour dispute, struggled to recapture his previous scoring pace with New York, often overshadowed by the addition of Rick Nash to the Rangers.

==== Columbus Blue Jackets (2013–2014) ====
After scoring nine goals in 35 games, Gáborík was dealt at the trade deadline on 3 April 2013, along with minor league players Blake Parlett and Steven Delisle, to the Columbus Blue Jackets in exchange for Derick Brassard, Derek Dorsett, John Moore and a sixth-round draft pick. The following night, Gáborík made his debut with the Blue Jackets and immediately made an impact, scoring the game-winning goal and earning an assist in a victory over the Nashville Predators. Gáborík then scored for Columbus in their opening game of the 2013–14 season, a 4–3 loss to the Calgary Flames. However, he shortly thereafter suffered an injury and missed 17 games to recover from a sprained left knee. In his first game back on 21 December 2013, he immediately broke his collarbone in the first period of a game against the Philadelphia Flyers.

=== Los Angeles Kings and Ottawa Senators (2014–2018) ===
Gáborík was traded to the Los Angeles Kings on 5 March 2014, in exchange for forward Matt Frattin, a second-round draft pick and a conditional third-round pick in the 2014 NHL entry draft. The Kings' acquisition of Gáborík paid dividends in the 2014 playoffs, as he went on to lead the playoffs with 14 goals and contributed to the Kings' effort in capturing their second Stanley Cup in three years, prevailing over his former club, the New York Rangers.

On 25 June 2014, Gáborík, as a pending free agent, opted to remain with the Kings in signing a seven-year, $34.125 million contract. In the 2014–15 season, Gaborik would put up 27 goals for 47 points point in 69 games with the Kings, including scoring the game winning goal at the 2015 NHL Stadium Series. Over the next three seasons, his goal scoring would drop and injuries would take their toll on him.

On 15 December 2017, Gáborík played his 1,000th career NHL game. Gáborík recorded two points in a 4–2 win to the Rangers.

However, two months later, on 13 February 2018, Gáborík and Nick Shore were traded to the Ottawa Senators in exchange for Dion Phaneuf and Nate Thompson. Gáborík underwent surgery to repair a herniated disk in his back on 5 April 2018. The 2017–18 season would prove to be his last, as he did not play the following three seasons after being placed on the injured reserve list.

On 27 December 2020, Gáborík's rights were traded along with goaltender Anders Nilsson from Ottawa to the Tampa Bay Lightning in exchange for defenseman Braydon Coburn, forward Cédric Paquette, and a 2022 second-round draft pick. This was viewed as a move to allow Tampa Bay to be salary cap compliant for the 2020–21 NHL season. On 4 November 2021, Gáborík officially announced his retirement from the NHL.

== Charity ==
Gáborík has used his success to benefit Slovak ice hockey and player development. In 2005, he opened his ice rink Arena Mariána Gáboríka in his native city of Trenčín at a personal cost of approximately 50 million Slovak koruna. The ice rink provides the opportunity to both learn how to skate as well as play ice hockey for local youth, and also contains both a full fitness center for off-ice conditioning and accommodations so that participants in programs may stay overnight. The rink earned the distinction of 2005 Construction of the Year in Trenčín. Beginning in 2009, Gáborík's ice rink has also begun offering a hockey school program.

Of the rink, Gáborík says:

"ARENA MG represents the fulfilment of one of my dreams. It was in Trenčín where I took my first ice-hockey steps, where I learned the first zigzags and shot my first goals. I am thankful for this opportunity and in order to give thanks for what ice hockey gave me, I also wanted to help other boys and girls and create conditions to help fulfil their sports dreams."

Gáborík spends a lot of personal time pursuing this endeavor during the off-season, as he personally attends each of his hockey school's summer camp sessions to meet the campers and pose for photographs.

Gáborík has also founded the Marian Gaborik Foundation, which also supports his mission of expanding access to youth hockey in Slovakia.

== Career statistics ==
=== Regular season and playoffs ===
Bold indicates led league

| | | | Regular season | | | | | Playoffs |
| Season | Team | League | GP | G | A | Pts | PIM | GP | G | A | Pts | PIM |
|---|---|---|---|---|---|---|---|---|---|---|---|---|
| 1997–98 | Dukla Trenčín | SVK U20 | 36 | 37 | 22 | 59 | 28 | — | — | — | — | — |
| 1997–98 | Dukla Trenčín | SVK | 1 | 1 | 0 | 1 | 0 | — | — | — | — | — |
| 1998–99 | Dukla Trenčín | SVK | 33 | 11 | 9 | 20 | 6 | 3 | 1 | 0 | 1 | 2 |
| 1999–00 | Dukla Trenčín | SVK | 50 | 25 | 21 | 46 | 34 | 5 | 1 | 2 | 3 | 2 |
| 2000–01 | Minnesota Wild | NHL | 71 | 18 | 18 | 36 | 32 | — | — | — | — | — |
| 2001–02 | Minnesota Wild | NHL | 78 | 30 | 37 | 67 | 34 | — | — | — | — | — |
| 2002–03 | Minnesota Wild | NHL | 81 | 30 | 35 | 65 | 46 | 18 | 9 | 8 | 17 | 6 |
| 2003–04 | Dukla Trenčín | SVK | 9 | 10 | 3 | 13 | 10 | — | — | — | — | — |
| 2003–04 | Minnesota Wild | NHL | 65 | 18 | 22 | 40 | 16 | — | — | — | — | — |
| 2004–05 | Färjestad BK | SEL | 12 | 6 | 4 | 10 | 45 | — | — | — | — | — |
| 2004–05 | Dukla Trenčín | SVK | 29 | 25 | 27 | 52 | 46 | 12 | 8 | 9 | 17 | 26 |
| 2005–06 | Minnesota Wild | NHL | 65 | 38 | 28 | 66 | 64 | — | — | — | — | — |
| 2006–07 | Minnesota Wild | NHL | 48 | 30 | 27 | 57 | 40 | 5 | 3 | 1 | 4 | 8 |
| 2007–08 | Minnesota Wild | NHL | 77 | 42 | 41 | 83 | 63 | 6 | 0 | 1 | 1 | 4 |
| 2008–09 | Minnesota Wild | NHL | 17 | 13 | 10 | 23 | 2 | — | — | — | — | — |
| 2009–10 | New York Rangers | NHL | 76 | 42 | 44 | 86 | 37 | — | — | — | — | — |
| 2010–11 | New York Rangers | NHL | 62 | 22 | 26 | 48 | 18 | 5 | 1 | 1 | 2 | 2 |
| 2011–12 | New York Rangers | NHL | 82 | 41 | 35 | 76 | 34 | 20 | 5 | 6 | 11 | 2 |
| 2012–13 | New York Rangers | NHL | 35 | 9 | 10 | 19 | 8 | — | — | — | — | — |
| 2012–13 | Columbus Blue Jackets | NHL | 12 | 3 | 5 | 8 | 6 | — | — | — | — | — |
| 2013–14 | Columbus Blue Jackets | NHL | 22 | 6 | 8 | 14 | 6 | — | — | — | — | — |
| 2013–14 | Los Angeles Kings | NHL | 19 | 5 | 11 | 16 | 4 | 26 | **14** | 8 | 22 | 6 |
| 2014–15 | Los Angeles Kings | NHL | 69 | 27 | 20 | 47 | 16 | — | — | — | — | — |
| 2015–16 | Los Angeles Kings | NHL | 54 | 12 | 10 | 22 | 20 | 4 | 0 | 1 | 1 | 2 |
| 2016–17 | Los Angeles Kings | NHL | 56 | 10 | 11 | 21 | 18 | — | — | — | — | — |
| 2017–18 | Los Angeles Kings | NHL | 30 | 7 | 7 | 14 | 18 | — | — | — | — | — |
| 2017–18 | Ottawa Senators | NHL | 16 | 4 | 3 | 7 | 6 | — | — | — | — | — |
| NHL totals | | | 1,035 | 407 | 408 | 815 | 492 | 84 | 32 | 26 | 58 | 30 |

=== International ===
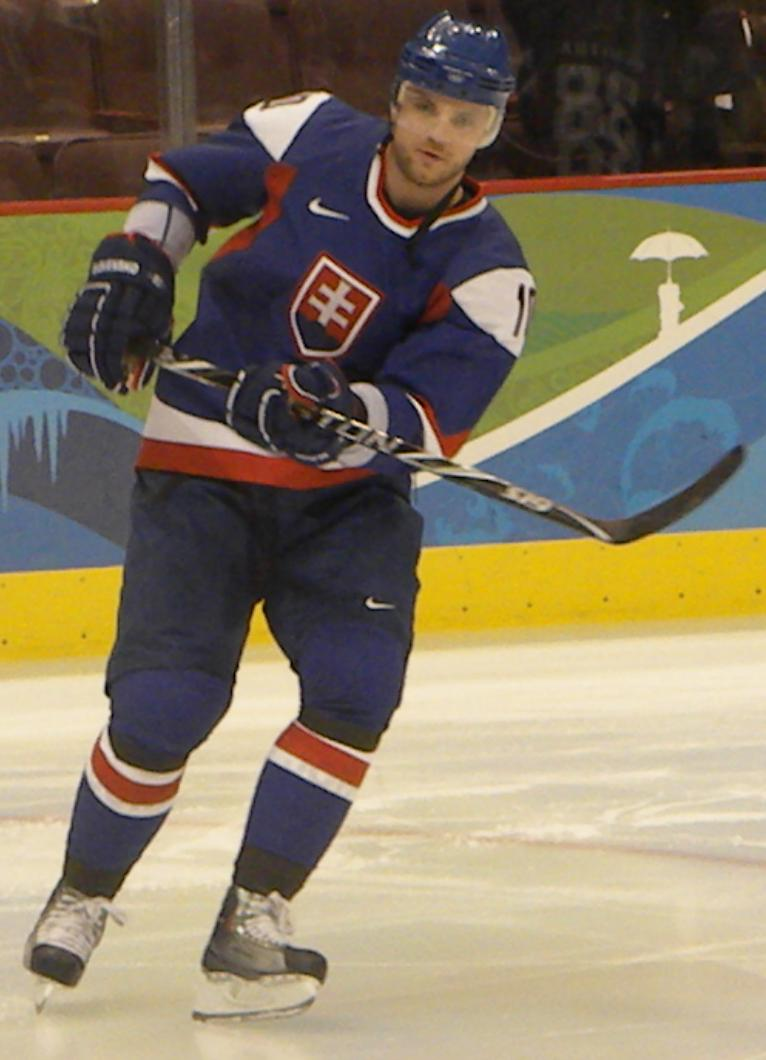
- Gáborík during the 2010 Winter Olympics

Medal record

Representing Slovakia

Men's ice hockey

World Junior Championships
| Bronze medal – third place | 1999 Canada | |

World U18 Championships
| Bronze medal – third place | 1999 Germany | |

| Year | Team | Event | Results | GP | G | A | Pts | PIM |
|---|---|---|---|---|---|---|---|---|
| 1998 | Slovakia | EJC18 | 6th | 6 | 2 | 1 | 3 | 0 |
| 1999 | Slovakia | WJC | 3rd place, bronze medalist(s) | 6 | 3 | 0 | 3 | 2 |
| 1999 | Slovakia | WJC18 | 3rd place, bronze medalist(s) | 7 | 3 | 8 | 11 | 2 |
| 2000 | Slovakia | WJC | 9th | 7 | 3 | 1 | 4 | 0 |
| 2000 | Slovakia | WJC18 | 5th | 6 | 6 | 2 | 8 | 12 |
| 2001 | Slovakia | WC | 7th | 7 | 2 | 1 | 3 | 0 |
| 2004 | Slovakia | WC | 4th | 9 | 4 | 2 | 6 | 4 |
| 2004 | Slovakia | WCH | 7th | 4 | 1 | 0 | 1 | 2 |
| 2005 | Slovakia | WC | 5th | 7 | 3 | 1 | 4 | 6 |
| 2006 | Slovakia | OLY | 5th | 6 | 3 | 4 | 7 | 4 |
| 2007 | Slovakia | WC | 6th | 6 | 5 | 6 | 11 | 14 |
| 2010 | Slovakia | OLY | 4th | 7 | 4 | 1 | 5 | 6 |
| 2011 | Slovakia | WC | 10th | 6 | 2 | 1 | 3 | 0 |
| 2015 | Slovakia | WC | 9th | 7 | 4 | 2 | 6 | 8 |
| 2016 | Team Europe | WCH | 2nd | 4 | 2 | 0 | 2 | 2 |
| Junior totals | | | | 32 | 17 | 12 | 29 | 16 |
| Senior totals | | | | 63 | 30 | 18 | 48 | 46 |

== Awards and honors ==
| Award | Year |
NHL
| NHL All-Star Game | 2003, 2008, 2012 |
| NHL All-Star Game MVP | 2012 |
| NHL Second All-Star Team | 2012 |
| Stanley Cup champion | 2014 |

| Preceded by Team founded | Minnesota Wild first-round draft pick 2000 | Succeeded by Mikko Koivu |
| Preceded by Mikko Koivu | Minnesota Wild captain March–April 2008 | Succeeded by Mikko Koivu |
