= Nick Shore =

American ice hockey player (born 1992)

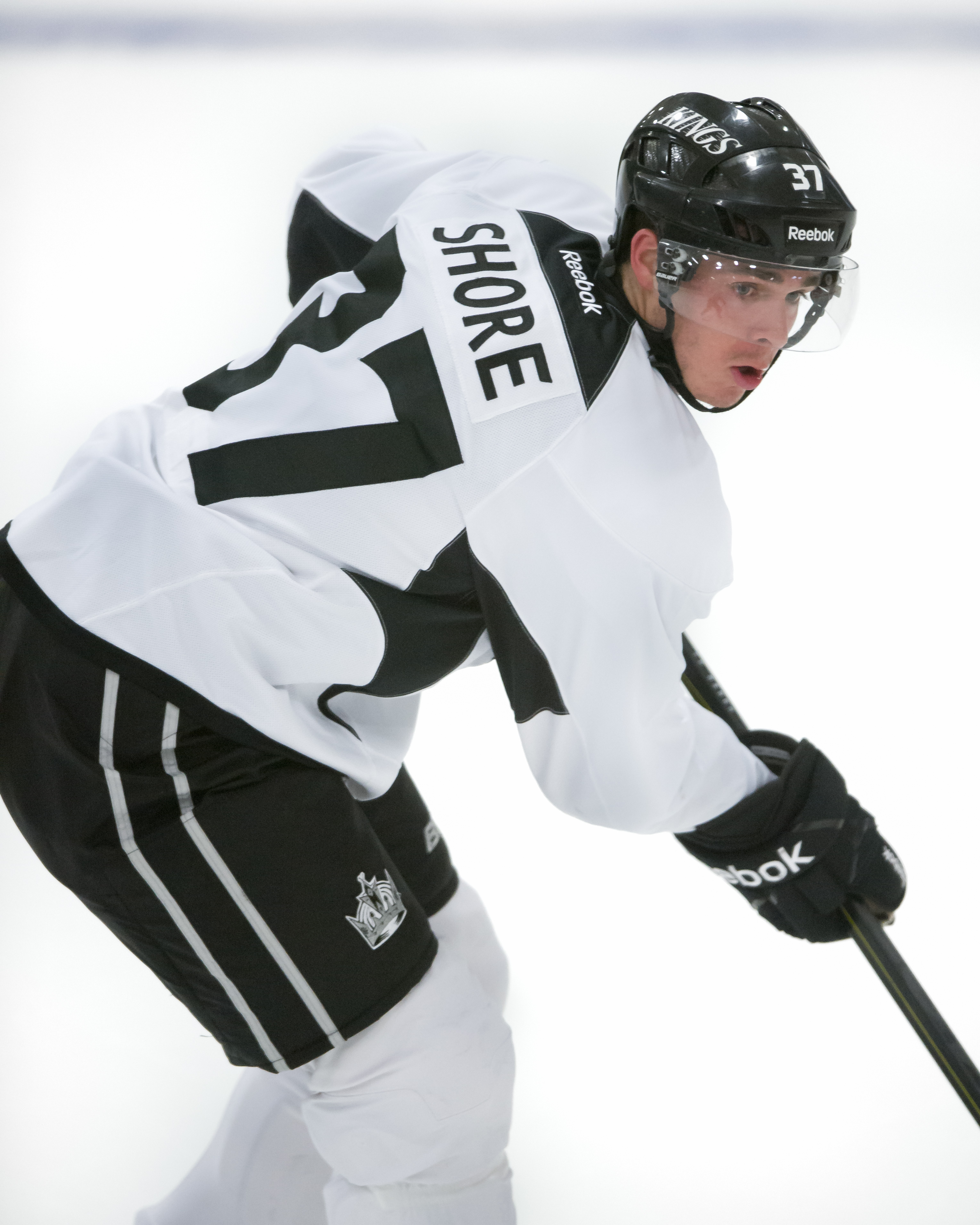
- Shore with the Los Angeles Kings in 2013
- Born: September 26, 1992 (age 34) Denver, Colorado, U.S.
- Height: 6 ft 1 in (185 cm)
- Weight: 195 lb (88 kg; 13 st 13 lb)
- Position: Center
- Shoots: Right
- SHL team Former teams: Linköping HC; Los Angeles Kings; Ottawa Senators; Calgary Flames; Metallurg Magnitogorsk; Toronto Maple Leafs; Winnipeg Jets; HK Dukla Trenčín; EV Zug; Sibir Novosibirsk; HC Ambrì-Piotta; HV71
- National team: United States
- NHL draft: 82nd overall, 2011; Los Angeles Kings
- Playing career: 2013–present

Nicholas Shore (born September 26, 1992) is an American professional ice hockey center who is currently playing for Linköping HC in the Swedish Hockey League (SHL). He was selected in the third round (82nd overall) by the Kings in the 2011 NHL entry draft, and has played in the NHL for the Los Angeles Kings, Ottawa Senators, Calgary Flames, Toronto Maple Leafs and Winnipeg Jets. Shore has played for multiple other teams in Europe, including HC Sibir Novosibirsk of the Kontinental Hockey League (KHL); however, after the 2022 Russian invasion of Ukraine, Shore elected to leave the team.

== Playing career ==
As a youth, Shore played in the 2005 Quebec International Pee-Wee Hockey Tournament with a minor ice hockey team from Littleton, Colorado.

Following the 2010–11 season with the University of Denver, Shore was selected in the third round, 82nd overall by the Los Angeles Kings during the 2011 NHL entry draft. Shore remained at Denver for two more seasons.

On April 13, 2013, the Kings signed Shore to a three-year, entry-level contract. He spent the 2013–14 season with the Kings' American Hockey League (AHL) affiliate, the Manchester Monarchs. In his first professional season, Shore recorded 14 goals and 24 assists in 68 games.

Shore made his NHL debut on January 17, 2015, against the Anaheim Ducks. He scored his first NHL goal on March 26, 2015, in a 3–2 win over the New York Islanders.

On July 16, 2015, the Kings signed Shore to a two-year, $1.2 million contract extension. Shore's first full season with the Kings came in 2015–16, where he scored three goals in 68 games.

On July 6, 2017, the Kings signed Shore to a one-year, $925,000 contract extension.

On February 13, 2018, Shore was traded to the Ottawa Senators along with Marián Gáborík in exchange for Dion Phaneuf and Nate Thompson. Shore appeared in six games with the Senators, registering one assist, before he was traded at the trade deadline to the Calgary Flames in exchange for a seventh-round pick in the 2019 NHL entry draft on February 26, 2018. At the conclusion of the season, Shore was not tendered a qualifying offer and was released to free agency.

On October 12, 2018, Shore signed a one-year contract with Metallurg Magnitogorsk of the Kontinental Hockey League (KHL). In the 2018–19 season, Shore collected 13 assists and 16 points in 37 games with Metallurg in a third-line center role.

On July 24, 2019, Shore returned to the NHL as a free agent, signing a one-year $750,000 contract with the Toronto Maple Leafs. Making the Maple Leafs opening roster for the 2019–20 season, Shore made 21 appearances in a fourth-line role, registering 3 points, before he was claimed by the Winnipeg Jets after being placed on waivers by the Maple Leafs on December 4, 2019. Shore played out the remainder of the season with the Jets, continuing a fourth-line duty, and registering 3 points in 42 regular season games.

As a free agent from the Jets, and with the indefinitely delayed North American season, Shore, alongside brother Drew, opted to sign a short-term contract abroad with Slovak club, HK Dukla Trenčín of the Tipsport Liga on November 19, 2020. In just five games with Dukla Shore collected 10 points before he returned to North America on December 3, 2020.

On January 11, 2021, Shore joined EV Zug of the National League (NL) for the remainder of the 2020–21 season.

Shore continued his career abroad, signing to play the 2021–22 season for the Russian club Sibir Novosibirsk of the Kontinental Hockey League, where he became the team's scoring leader in the regular season. Shore posted 26 points through 49 regular season games before leaving Sibir on 1 March 2022 due to the Russian invasion of Ukraine.

As a free agent in the off-season, Shore returned to Switzerland after signing a one-year contract with HC Ambrì-Piotta of the NL on July 31, 2022. Shore opened the 2022–23 season with Ambrì-Piotta, registering 2 goals and 7 points through 18 appearances before opting to leave the club and join Swedish outfit, HV71 of the SHL, for the remainder of the season on December 13, 2022.

Following the completion of his tenure with HV71, Shore returned to North America as a free agent and was later signed to a professional tryout contract to attend the Carolina Hurricanes training camp in preparation for the 2023–24 season on August 30, 2023.

== Personal life ==
All three of Shore's brothers play hockey, two of them professionally. Drew is a forward for the Carolina Hurricanes of the NHL, Quentin played briefly in the American Hockey League, and Baker is a member of Harvard University. Nick, Drew and Quentin all attended the University of Denver.

== Career statistics ==
=== Regular season and playoffs ===
			Regular season					Playoffs
Season	Team	League	GP	G	A	Pts	PIM	GP	G	A	Pts	PIM
2008–09	U.S. NTDP U17	USDP	16	7	6	13	18	—	—	—	—	—
2008–09	U.S. NTDP U18	NAHL	42	10	11	21	30	9	2	2	4	6
2009–10	U.S. NTDP Juniors	USHL	26	6	14	20	10	—	—	—	—	—
2009–10	U.S. NTDP U18	USDP	39	13	24	37	30	—	—	—	—	—
2010–11	University of Denver	WCHA	33	7	11	18	37	—	—	—	—	—
2011–12	University of Denver	WCHA	43	13	28	41	16	—	—	—	—	—
2012–13	University of Denver	WCHA	39	14	20	34	47	—	—	—	—	—
2013–14	Manchester Monarchs	AHL	68	14	24	38	36	4	0	1	1	0
2014–15	Manchester Monarchs	AHL	38	20	22	42	16	19	4	14	18	2
2014–15	Los Angeles Kings	NHL	34	1	6	7	10	—	—	—	—	—
2015–16	Los Angeles Kings	NHL	68	3	7	10	32	1	0	0	0	0
2016–17	Los Angeles Kings	NHL	70	6	11	17	20	—	—	—	—	—
2017–18	Los Angeles Kings	NHL	48	4	11	15	12	—	—	—	—	—
2017–18	Ottawa Senators	NHL	6	0	1	1	0	—	—	—	—	—
2017–18	Calgary Flames	NHL	9	1	2	3	4	—	—	—	—	—
2018–19	Metallurg Magnitogorsk	KHL	37	3	13	16	22	6	2	3	5	6
2019–20	Toronto Maple Leafs	NHL	21	2	1	3	12	—	—	—	—	—
2019–20	Winnipeg Jets	NHL	42	1	2	3	8	4	0	0	0	2
2020–21	HK Dukla Trenčín	Slovak	5	4	6	10	0	—	—	—	—	—
2020–21	EV Zug	NL	22	8	19	27	22	13	1	7	8	4
2021–22	Sibir Novosibirsk	KHL	49	10	16	26	26	—	—	—	—	—
2022–23	HC Ambrì-Piotta	NL	18	2	5	7	4	—	—	—	—	—
2022–23	HV71	SHL	25	5	13	18	18	—	—	—	—	—
2023–24	HV71	SHL	39	13	18	31	8	—	—	—	—	—
2024–25	Linköping HC	SHL	43	8	14	22	22	—	—	—	—	—
NHL totals			299	18	41	59	98	5	0	0	0	2
KHL totals			86	13	29	42	48	6	2	3	5	6

=== International ===
Year	Team	Event	Result	GP	G	A	Pts	PIM
2009	United States	U17	3rd place, bronze medalist(s)	6	5	4	9	8
2010	United States	U18	1st place, gold medalist(s)	7	3	7	10	0
2022	United States	OG	5th	3	0	1	1	0
Junior totals				13	8	11	19	8
Senior totals				3	0	1	1	0

== Awards and honors ==
Award	Year
College
WCHA All-Academic Team	2012, 2013
AHL
Calder Cup	2015
