= Milan Michálek =

Czech ice hockey player (born 1984)

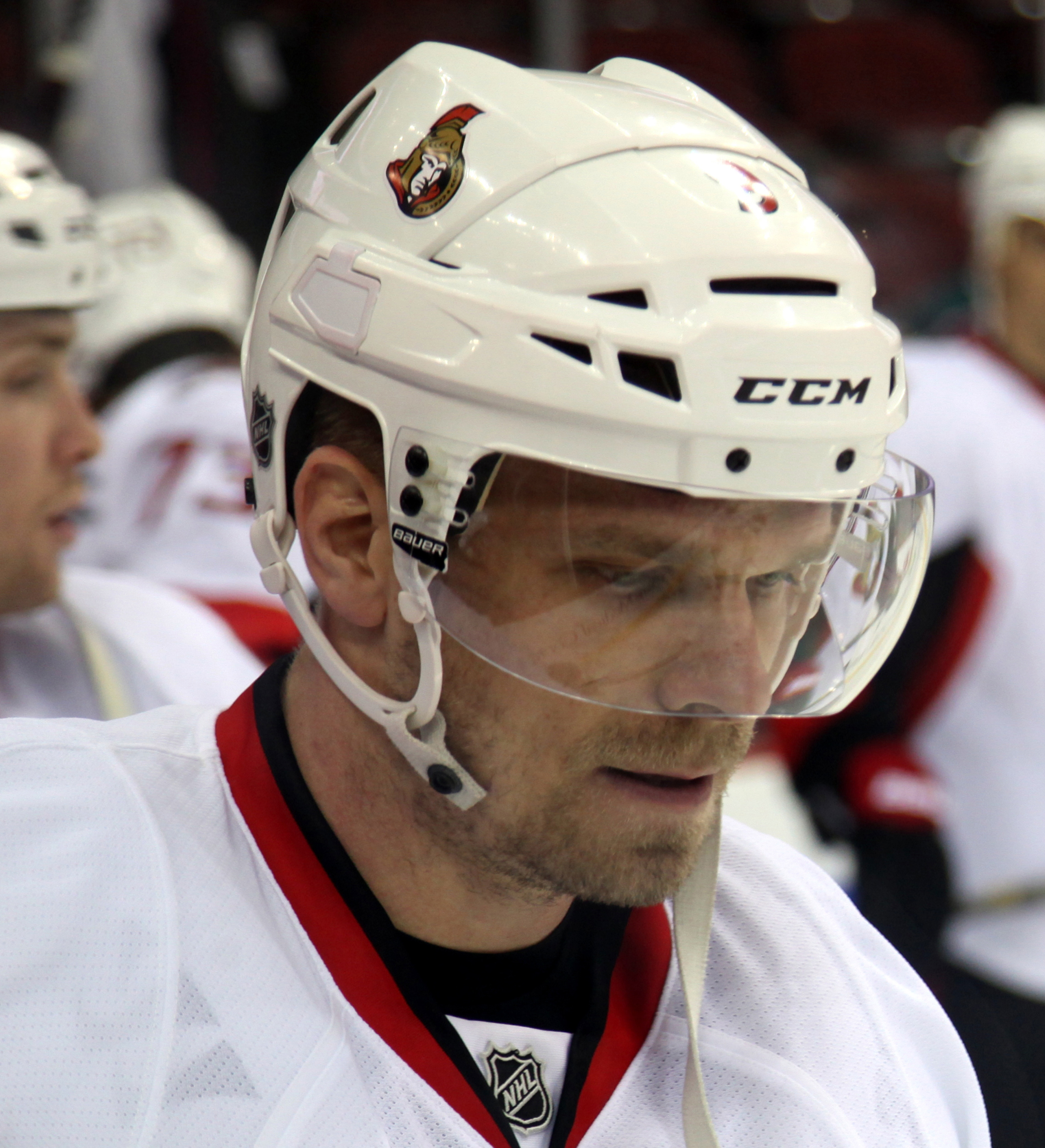
- Michálek with the Ottawa Senators in 2013
- Born: 7 December 1984 (age 41) Jindřichův Hradec, Czechoslovakia
- Height: 6 ft 2 in (188 cm)
- Weight: 225 lb (102 kg; 16 st 1 lb)
- Position: Left wing
- Shot: Left
- Played for: San Jose Sharks; Ottawa Senators; Toronto Maple Leafs
- National team: Czech Republic
- NHL draft: 6th overall, 2003; San Jose Sharks
- Playing career: 2000–2016
Medal record
Representing Czech Republic
World Championships
Bronze medal – third place	2011 Bratislava
Bronze medal – third place	2012 Helsinki
World U18 Championships
Bronze medal – third place	2002 Slovakia

Milan Michálek (/mɪˈkælɛk/; Czech pronunciation: [ˈmɪlan ˈmɪxaːlɛk]; born 7 December 1984) is a Czech former professional ice hockey left winger who most recently played under contract to the Toronto Maple Leafs of the National Hockey League (NHL). He was drafted sixth overall by the San Jose Sharks in the 2003 NHL entry draft.

His older brother is Zbyněk Michálek, a defenceman who last played in the NHL within the Arizona Coyotes organization.

== Playing career ==
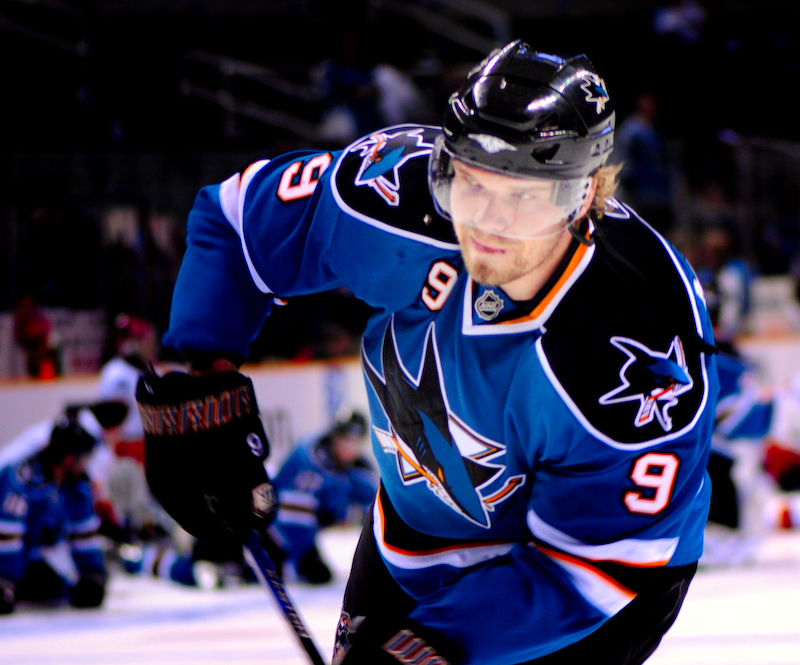
Michálek during his time with the Sharks.

Michálek scored a goal in his first NHL game before suffering a serious knee injury the next game, on 11 October 2003, tearing his right ACL. After knee surgery, Michálek played in the American Hockey League (AHL) before injuring his knee again on 22 January. During the 2004–05 NHL lockout, Michálek did not play anywhere, spending the time rehabilitating his knee.

Michálek played his first full season with the Sharks in 2005–06, scoring 17 goals and 35 points and earning the San Jose Sharks' PlayStation Rookie of the Year award. In the 2006–07 season, Michálek emerged as a speedy, multidimensional player and an offensive threat, scoring 26 goals and 66 points. During the following offseason, Michálek signed a six-year, $26 million contract extension through 2014 while still having one year left on his original rookie contract. It was the longest and most lucrative contract ever signed by a Sharks player. In 2007–08, Michálek played primarily on the Sharks' top line with Joe Thornton. Michálek's production dipped to 24 goals and 55 points, but due to the Sharks' overall offensive struggles, he was still second on the team to Thornton in goals and points.

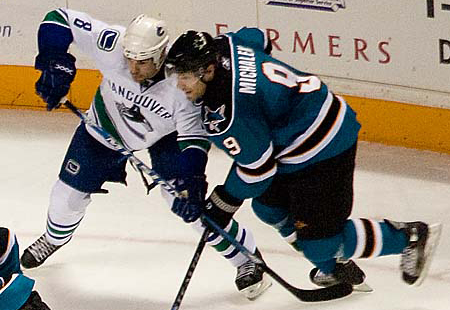
Michálek battles for position with Willie Mitchell.

On 12 September 2009, Michálek was traded by the Sharks along with Jonathan Cheechoo and a second-round pick in 2010 to the Ottawa Senators in exchange for forward Dany Heatley and a fifth-round draft pick in 2010.

With the Senators, Michálek scored his first career NHL hat-trick against the Tampa Bay Lightning on 15 October 2009; two shorthanded and one on the powerplay. On 1 December, he scored two goals against his former team in a 5–2 loss in San Jose.

Michálek suffered a concussion after colliding with teammate Erik Karlsson on 13 December 2011, causing him to miss five games. At the time of the injury, he was leading the NHL in goals with 19. He was later selected in fan balloting as a starter in the 2012 NHL All-Star Game and finished the season with a career high 35 goals.

Whilst injured during the 2015–16 season, Michálek was dealt to the Toronto Maple Leafs on 9 February 2016, in a blockbuster nine-player trade focusing around Dion Phaneuf heading to Ottawa.

== International play ==
Michálek played on the 2010 Czech Republic Olympic hockey team along with his brother. He played in five games and scored two goals in those Olympics. The two brothers also played for the Czech team which finished sixth in the 2014 Olympics.

== Career statistics ==
=== Regular season and playoffs ===
			Regular season					Playoffs
Season	Team	League	GP	G	A	Pts	PIM	GP	G	A	Pts	PIM
2000–01	HC České Budějovice	CZE U20	30	10	13	23	30	4	1	3	4	2
2000–01	HC České Budějovice	ELH	5	0	0	0	0	—	—	—	—	—
2001–02	HC České Budějovice	CZE U20	5	3	2	5	4	7	5	4	9	14
2001–02	HC České Budějovice	ELH	47	6	11	17	12	—	—	—	—	—
2001–02	SHC Vajgar Jindřichův Hradec	CZE.3	—	—	—	—	—	3	2	0	2	2
2002–03	HC České Budějovice	ELH	46	3	5	8	14	4	1	0	1	2
2002–03	HC Vagnerplast Kladno	CZE.2	—	—	—	—	—	6	2	2	4	16
2003–04	San Jose Sharks	NHL	2	1	0	1	4	—	—	—	—	—
2003–04	Cleveland Barons	AHL	7	2	2	4	4	—	—	—	—	—
2005–06	San Jose Sharks	NHL	81	17	18	35	45	9	1	4	5	8
2006–07	San Jose Sharks	NHL	78	26	40	66	36	11	4	2	6	4
2007–08	San Jose Sharks	NHL	79	24	31	55	47	13	4	0	4	4
2008–09	San Jose Sharks	NHL	77	23	34	57	52	6	1	0	1	2
2009–10	Ottawa Senators	NHL	66	22	12	34	18	1	0	0	0	0
2010–11	Ottawa Senators	NHL	66	18	15	33	49	—	—	—	—	—
2011–12	Ottawa Senators	NHL	77	35	25	60	32	7	1	1	2	4
2012–13	HC Mountfield	ELH	21	13	11	24	26	—	—	—	—	—
2012–13	Ottawa Senators	NHL	23	4	10	14	17	10	3	2	5	2
2013–14	Ottawa Senators	NHL	82	17	22	39	41	—	—	—	—	—
2014–15	Ottawa Senators	NHL	66	13	21	34	33	6	1	0	1	4
2015–16	Ottawa Senators	NHL	32	6	4	10	12	—	—	—	—	—
2015–16	Toronto Maple Leafs	NHL	13	1	5	6	6	—	—	—	—	—
2016–17	Toronto Maple Leafs	NHL	5	1	1	2	2	—	—	—	—	—
2016–17	Toronto Marlies	AHL	16	2	3	5	20	—	—	—	—	—
NHL totals			747	208	238	446	394	63	15	9	24	28

=== International ===
Year	Team	Event	Result	GP	G	A	Pts	PIM
2000	Czech Republic	U17	5th	5	3	3	6	0
2001	Czech Republic	WJC18	4th	7	1	1	2	6
2002	Czech Republic	WJC18	3rd place, bronze medalist(s)	8	7	1	8	30
2003	Czech Republic	WJC	6th	6	2	2	4	2
2003	Czech Republic	WC	4th	1	0	0	0	0
2009	Czech Republic	WC	6th	3	1	0	1	4
2010	Czech Republic	OG	7th	5	2	0	2	0
2011	Czech Republic	WC	3rd place, bronze medalist(s)	8	4	2	6	6
2012	Czech Republic	WC	3rd place, bronze medalist(s)	9	2	2	4	4
2014	Czech Republic	OG	6th	5	0	0	0	0
2016	Czech Republic	WCH	6th	3	2	1	3	2
Junior totals				26	13	7	20	38
Senior totals				34	11	5	16	16

== See also ==
- Notable families in the NHL

Awards and achievements
Preceded by Mike Morris	San Jose Sharks first round draft pick 2003	Succeeded by Steve Bernier
