= 2012 National Hockey League All-Star Game =

Professional ice hockey exhibition game

2012 NHL All-Star Game
	1	2	3	Total
Team Chara	3	3	6	12
Team Alfredsson	3	3	3	9
- Date: January 29, 2012
- Arena: Scotiabank Place
- City: Ottawa
- MVP: Marian Gaborik (NY Rangers)
- Attendance: 20,510

The 2012 National Hockey League All-Star Game, (also known as the 2012 Tim Hortons NHL All-Star Game) took place on January 29, 2012, at Scotiabank Place in Ottawa. This edition of the All-Star Game featured the "fantasy draft" format first seen in the previous 2011 NHL All-Star Game. The participating players voted for team captains, selecting Daniel Alfredsson of the All-Star host Ottawa Senators and Zdeno Chara of the defending Stanley Cup champion Boston Bruins, himself also a former Senator.

The event marked the first time the city of Ottawa hosted an NHL All-Star Game. Ottawa has hosted two NHL entry drafts, a Stanley Cup Final and the World Junior Championships all in the past five years. It marked the 20th anniversary of the Ottawa Senators joining the NHL. It was the second All-Star Game that Canada has hosted in the past three years, as the Montreal Canadiens hosted it in 2009. Winning goaltender Tim Thomas became the only goaltender in NHL history to win four consecutive All-Star games.

== Rosters ==
=== Fan balloting ===
Voting for NHL all-star players started on November 14, 2011. Online voting required fans to register with the NHL.com web site, with votes limited to 30 votes per "platform", i.e. desktop computer, web-enabled mobile devices and SMS text. Fans were presented a list of 127 players, sub-divided into Forwards, Defence and Goaltending. Three forwards, two defence and one goaltender could be selected from the League-wide list of players. The selection of League-wide list of players was done in 2011, which used the "fantasy team" format.

After voting closed, Erik Karlsson was the leading vote-getter with 939,951. Senators fans voted in force, electing not only Karlsson but all three forwards as well (Daniel Alfredsson, Jason Spezza and Milan Michalek) to the starting lineup. The only skater not coming from the hometown Senators was Toronto Maple Leafs defenceman Dion Phaneuf. Phaneuf beat out Senators defenceman Sergei Gonchar by only 11,305 votes. Reigning Vezina and Conn Smythe Trophy winner Tim Thomas was elected as the fan-voted goaltender.

Number
#	Name	Pos.	Team	Votes
11	Daniel Alfredsson	RW	Ottawa Senators	897,055
19	Jason Spezza	C	Ottawa Senators	817,483
9	Milan Michalek	LW	Ottawa Senators	743,977
65	Erik Karlsson	D	Ottawa Senators	939,951
3	Dion Phaneuf	D	Toronto Maple Leafs	614,933
30	Tim Thomas	G	Boston Bruins	626,540

=== Draft ===
After naming the remaining All-Stars, the participating players voted for team captains, selecting Daniel Alfredsson of the hosting Ottawa Senators and Zdeno Chara of the defending Stanley Cup champion Boston Bruins. Alfredsson's team would wear white, while Team Chara would wear blue. The NHL named the coaches: head coach Claude Julien, and assistants Doug Houda, Doug Jarvis and Geoff Ward of the Boston Bruins for Team Chara; and John Tortorella of the New York Rangers and Todd McLellan of the San Jose Sharks as co-coaches for Team Alfredsson.

The draft of the players took place on January 26, 2012, from 8:00 pm to 9:30 pm, Eastern time. It was held at the Théâtre du Casino du Lac-Leamy, in Gatineau, Quebec. Team Chara won the puck flip and selected first.

Team Alfredsson (Home)
Round	Nat.	Player	Team	Pos.	Num.
C	(Sweden)	Daniel Alfredsson	Ottawa Senators	RW	11
A	(Sweden)	Henrik Lundqvist	New York Rangers	G	30
1	(Sweden)	Erik Karlsson	Ottawa Senators	D	65
2	(Canada)	Jason Spezza	Ottawa Senators	C	19
3	(United States)	Jonathan Quick	Los Angeles Kings	G	32
4	(Canada)	Claude Giroux	Philadelphia Flyers	C	28
5	(Canada)	Kris Letang	Pittsburgh Penguins	D	58
6	(Canada)	Steven Stamkos	Tampa Bay Lightning	C	91
7	(Canada)	Brian Elliott	St. Louis Blues	G	1
8	(Canada)	Shea Weber	Nashville Predators	D	6
9	(Sweden)	Daniel Sedin	Vancouver Canucks	LW	22
10	(Canada)	Dan Girardi	New York Rangers	D	5
11	(United States)	Keith Yandle	Phoenix Coyotes	D	3
12	(Czech Republic)	Milan Michalek	Ottawa Senators	LW	9
13	(Sweden)	Henrik Sedin	Vancouver Canucks	C	33
14	(Canada)	James Neal	Pittsburgh Penguins	LW	18
15	(Sweden)	Alexander Edler	Vancouver Canucks	D	23
16	(Canada)	John Tavares	New York Islanders	C	91
17	(Canada)	Scott Hartnell	Philadelphia Flyers	LW	19
18	(United States)	Jason Pominville	Buffalo Sabres	RW	29
19	(Canada)	Logan Couture	San Jose Sharks	C	39
–	Co-head coach: John Tortorella			–	–
–	Co-head coach: Todd McLellan			–	–

Team Chara (Away)
Round	Nat.	Player	Team	Pos.	Num.
C	(Slovakia)	Zdeno Chara	Boston Bruins	D	33
A	(Canada)	Joffrey Lupul	Toronto Maple Leafs	RW	19
1	(Russia)	Pavel Datsyuk	Detroit Red Wings	C	13
2	(United States)	Tim Thomas	Boston Bruins	G	30
3	(Russia)	Evgeni Malkin	Pittsburgh Penguins	C	71
4	(Slovakia)	Marian Hossa	Chicago Blackhawks	RW	81
5	(Finland)	Kimmo Timonen	Philadelphia Flyers	D	44
6	(Canada)	Corey Perry	Anaheim Ducks	RW	10
7	(Canada)	Carey Price	Montreal Canadiens	G	31
8	(United States)	Phil Kessel	Toronto Maple Leafs	RW	81
9	(United States)	Ryan Suter	Nashville Predators	D	20
10	(United States)	Jimmy Howard	Detroit Red Wings	G	35
11	(Canada)	Brian Campbell	Florida Panthers	D	51
12	(United States)	Patrick Kane	Chicago Blackhawks	RW	88
13	(Canada)	Dion Phaneuf	Toronto Maple Leafs	D	3
14	(Canada)	Jarome Iginla	Calgary Flames	RW	12
15	(Canada)	Dennis Wideman	Washington Capitals	D	6
16	(Slovakia)	Marian Gaborik	New York Rangers	RW	10
17	(Canada)	Jordan Eberle	Edmonton Oilers	RW	14
18	(Canada)	Tyler Seguin	Boston Bruins	C	19
19	(Canada)	Jamie Benn	Dallas Stars	LW	14
–	Head coach: Claude Julien			–	–
–	Assistant coaches: Doug Houda, Doug Jarvis and Geoff Ward			–	–

=== Rookies ===
Team Alfredsson Rookies
Nat.	Player	Team	Pos.	Num.
(Canada)	Sean Couturier	Philadelphia Flyers	C	14
(United States)	Justin Faulk	Carolina Hurricanes	D	28
(Sweden)	Carl Hagelin	New York Rangers	LW	62
(Canada)	Nick Johnson	Minnesota Wild	RW/LW	25
(Canada)	Matt Read	Philadelphia Flyers	RW	24
(United States)	Craig Smith	Nashville Predators	C	15

Team Chara Rookies
Nat.	Player	Team	Pos.	Num.
(Canada)	Luke Adam	Buffalo Sabres	C	72
(Switzerland)	Raphael Diaz	Montreal Canadiens	D	61
(Canada)	Colin Greening	Ottawa Senators	LW	14
(Canada)	Cody Hodgson	Vancouver Canucks	C	9
(Canada)	Ryan Johansen	Columbus Blue Jackets	C	19
(Sweden)	Gabriel Landeskog	Colorado Avalanche	LW	92

Source: NHL.

Withdrawn

Prior to the draft several players withdrew due to injury or personal reasons:

Number
Nat.	Name	Team	Pos.	Reason and replacement
(Finland)	Mikko Koivu	Minnesota Wild	C	Left shoulder injury, replaced by Jordan Eberle
(Russia)	Alexander Ovechkin	Washington Capitals	LW	Voluntary withdrawal because of suspension (although the All- Star Game does not count as a game with respect to suspensions), replaced by James Neal
(Canada)	Jonathan Toews	Chicago Blackhawks	C	Hand injury, replaced by Scott Hartnell
(United States)	Dustin Byfuglien	Winnipeg Jets	D	Knee injury, replaced by Kris Letang
(Canada)	Adam Henrique (rookie)	New Jersey Devils	C	Groin injury, replaced by Carl Hagelin on rookie roster
(Canada)	Ryan Nugent-Hopkins (rookie)	Edmonton Oilers	C	Left shoulder injury, replaced by Nick Johnson on rookie roster
(Sweden)	Adam Larsson (rookie)	New Jersey Devils	D	Wrist injury, replaced by Raphael Diaz on rookie roster

== Game summary ==
The game was played from 4pm until 7pm local time. It was broadcast nationally in Canada on CBC, and in the United States on the NBC Sports Network. Singer-songwriter Outasight performed "Tonight Is the Night" during the player introductions. Canadian rapper Drake performed during the second intermission. The Voice season 1 winner Javier Colon sang the American national anthem while retired Ontario Provincial Police officer and Ottawa Senators anthem singer Lyndon Slewidge accompanied by the Governor General's Foot Guards Band sang the Canadian national anthem in English and French.

Team Alfredsson	9 – 12 (3-3, 3-3, 3-6)	Team Chara	Scotiabank Place (20,510); Ottawa, Ontario
First period
4:34 Gaborik (Datsyuk)	Referees:
5:38 Malkin (Iginla)	Eric Furlatt
10:09 Gaborik (2) (Hossa, Suter)	Brad Kovachik
Spezza (Girardi, Michalek) 10:36	Linesmen:
H. Sedin (Hartnell, Letang) 12:51	Tim Peel
Tavares (Pominville, Yandle) 13:49	Derek Amell
Second period	MVP: Marian Gaborik
1:23 Gaborik (3) (Hossa, Datsyuk)
3:33 Lupul (Kessel)
Pominville (Neal, Stamkos) 7:17
Alfredsson 14:33
Alfredsson (2) (D. Sedin, H. Sedin) 16:04
18:24 Kane (Eberle)
Third period
4:12 Kessel (Campbell)
Michalek (Tavares, Spezza) 5:21
7:45 Iginla (Malkin, Perry)
Giroux (Hartnell, Couture) 9:40
12:04 Hossa (Datsyuk)
12:20 Chara (GWG) (Gaborik)
13:26 Perry (Iginla, Wideman)
D. Sedin (H. Sedin, Alfredsson) 14:20
15:33 Lupul (2) (Seguin, Kessel)

W – Tim Thomas L – Brian Elliott

- Missed penalty shot: Stamkos, TAS, 16:33 first.
- Shots on goal:
  - Team Alfredsson: 14-15-21-50.
  - Team Chara: 12-13-19-44.

Source: NHL.

== SuperSkills Competition ==
The competition was held at Scotiabank Place on January 28, 2012 between 7pm and 10pm local time. It was broadcast nationally in Canada on CBC, and in the United States on the NBC Sports Network.

=== Fastest Skater ===
In this event, pairs of skaters raced each other simultaneously on parallel courses on the rink. Each race was worth one point for their winning racer's team, and the fastest two skaters then had a final race for another point.

Heat	Team Alfredsson	Time (sec)	Time (sec)	Team Chara
1	Kris Letang	14.501	14.826	Brian Campbell
2	Jonathan Quick	16.939	17.514	Jimmy Howard
3	Carl Hagelin	12.993	12.963	Colin Greening
4	Keith Yandle	13.731	13.203	Phil Kessel
5	Erik Karlsson	13.021	13.343	Marian Hossa
Final	**Hagelin**	13.218	13.303	Greening
Event score: 4–2 Team Alfredsson; Overall score: 4–2 Team Alfredsson

=== Breakaway Challenge ===
In this competition, competitors skated with the puck and attempted to score on the opposing team's goalie. The winner was also judged on their presentation. The winner was determined by SMS messages sent to the NHL. The winner, Patrick Kane, donned a Superman cape and Clark Kent-style glasses, skated in and dove to the ice, passed the puck from his left hand to his stick held in his right hand and scored. Runner-up Corey Perry threw away his stick and gloves and removed a hidden mini-stick from his equipment. He then skated in and deked out the goaltender with his stick. Kane, in his second attempt as Superman, shot a puck designed to explode into pieces.

Team Alfredsson	Vote %	Vote %	Team Chara
Sean Couturier	9%	1%	Ryan Johansen
John Tavares	8%	47%	**Patrick Kane**
Logan Couture	5%	29%	Corey Perry
Event score: 1–0 Team Chara; Overall score: 4–3 Team Alfredsson

=== Accuracy Shooting ===
In this event, competitors were positioned in front of the net, and were passed the puck from two players situated behind the goal line. The players had to hit targets at the four corners of the net in the fastest time.

Heat	Team Alfredsson	Time (sec)	Time (sec)	Team Chara
1	Matt Read	14.011	20.929	Cody Hodgson
2	Jason Spezza	18.639	30.092	Tyler Seguin
3	Steven Stamkos	44.684	13.583	Jamie Benn
4	Daniel Sedin	21.459	15.846	Marian Hossa
Final	Read	16.361	10.204	**Benn**
Event score: 3–2 Team Chara; Overall score: 6–6

=== Challenge Relay ===
In this competition, teams were selected from each side. Each player on the team had one skill to complete before the next player could start. The goal was to complete the relay in the fastest time.

Heat	Team Alfredsson	Time (min)	Time (min)	Team Chara
1	Group 1 Nick Johnson (One-timer passer); Shea Weber (One-timer RH); Kris Letang (One-timer RH); Steven Stamkos (One-timer RH); Henrik Sedin (Passing accuracy); Milan Michalek (Puck control); Logan Couture (Stick handling); James Neal (Target shooter)	2:28	2:45	Group 1 Ryan Suter (One-timer passer); Dennis Wideman (One-timer RH); Jarome Iginla (One-timer RH); Joffrey Lupul (One-timer RH); Patrick Kane (Passing accuracy); Pavel Datsyuk (Puck control); Gabriel Landeskog (Stick handling); Marian Gaborik (Target shooter)
2	**Group 2** Alexander Edler (One-timer passer); Keith Yandle (One-timer LH); Scott Hartnell (One-timer LH); John Tavares (One-timer LH); Daniel Sedin (Passing accuracy); Craig Smith (Puck control); Claude Giroux (Stick handling); Jason Pominville (Target shooter)	2:08	2:14	Group 2 Jordan Eberle (One-timer passer); Dion Phaneuf (One-timer LH); Zdeno Chara (One-timer LH); Jamie Benn (One-timer LH); Kimmo Timonen (Passing accuracy); Raphael Diaz (Puck control); Evgeni Malkin (Stick handling); Phil Kessel (Target shooter)
Event score: 3–0 Team Alfredsson; Overall score: 9–6 Team Alfredsson

=== Hardest Shot ===
In this competition, players skated in from the blue line, and slapped a puck as fast as possible on the net.

Heat	Team Alfredsson	Speed (mph)	Speed (mph)	Team Chara
1	Justin Faulk	95.9	98.3	Luke Adam
2	Daniel Alfredsson	101.3	95.3	Dennis Wideman
3	Jason Spezza	100.5	97.9	Dion Phaneuf
4	Shea Weber	104.9	108.8*	Zdeno Chara
Final	Weber	106.0	107.0	**Chara**
Event score: 3–2 Team Chara; Overall score: 11–9 Team Alfredsson
* denotes record

=== Elimination Shootout ===
In this competition, players attempted to score on the opposing team's goalie. Players who scored earned a point for their team for each goal they scored. Players were eliminated from the competition if they failed to score.

Team Alfredsson	Result	Result	Team Chara
Round 1
Carl Hagelin	Save	Save	Colin Greening
Steven Stamkos	Goal	Save	Pavel Datsyuk
John Tavares	Goal	Goal	Evgeni Malkin
Jason Spezza	Goal	Save	Corey Perry
Claude Giroux	Save	Save	Tyler Seguin
Daniel Alfredsson	Goal	Save	Marian Gaborik
James Neal	Save	Save	Patrick Kane
Milan Michalek	Save	Goal	Jarome Iginla
Jason Pominville	Goal	Save	Jamie Benn
Kris Letang	Goal	Save	Joffrey Lupul
Erik Karlsson	Save	Goal	Kimmo Timonen
Daniel Sedin	Save	Save	Ryan Suter
Round 2
Steven Stamkos	Goal	Save	Evgeni Malkin
John Tavares	Goal	Save	Jarome Iginla
Jason Spezza	Save	Save	Kimmo Timonen
Daniel Alfredsson	Save		
Jason Pominville	Goal		
Kris Letang	Save		
Round 3
**Steven Stamkos**	Goal		
John Tavares	Save		
Jason Pominville	Save		
Event score: 10–3 Team Alfredsson; **Final overall score: 21–12 Team Alfredsson**

- italics = Heat winner
- **bold** = Event winner
- each heat and event winner earns a point for their team

Source: NHL

== All-Star Weekend ==
In conjunction with the Game and the Skills Competition, events were held from January 26 through January 29. The NHL held a "Fan Fair" at the Ottawa Convention Centre. The Fan Fair had displays of the NHL's trophies, autograph signings, interactive displays and presentations and broadcasts by the NHL's SiriusXM and NHL Network partners. Team and All-Star Game merchandise and memorabilia was also for sale. Events were held on the Rideau Canal, at Confederation Park and at the Byward Market. Ottawa's annual Winterlude winter carnival opened its site at Confederation Park one week early for the game weekend. Activities include:

- NHL Trophy Procession on the Rideau Canal Skateway
- Ice Sculptures at Confederation Park
- Nightly DJs at Confederation Park
- Energizer Night Skate at NHL All-Star on the Rideau Canal Skateway
- All-Star Concert in The Cabin at The Great Canadian Cabin nightclub in the Byward Market
- Canadian Tire NHL Junior Skills National Championship on the Rideau Canal Skateway

Weather conditions forced the closure of the Rideau Canal to public skating during the weekend. The trophy procession and junior skills competition were able to be held on the canal according to schedule. The Energizer Night Skate was moved to the Rink of Dreams ice rink nearby.

Interest in the four-day festivities broke records across the board in terms of North American television ratings and digital consumption, according to figures released by the NHL. Across North America, 17.7 million viewers tuned into all or part of NHL All-Star Weekend events, including the Molson Canadian NHL All-Star Fantasy Player Draft held at the Hilton Lac Leamy. Those events were televised on CBC, TSN and RDS in Canada, and by the NBC Sports Network in the United States.

In Canada, CBC recorded its highest viewership for the NHL All-Star Game and skills competition since the current system of audience measurement was instituted in 1989–90. In all, 10.2 million viewers tuned into at least some part of CBC's coverage, representing 30% of the Canadian population. Meanwhile, the player draft attracted 1.34 million viewers on TSN and another 254,000 on RDS. A total of 3.7 million unique viewers saw at least part of the telecast.
