= Minnesota Wild =

National Hockey League team in Saint Paul, Minnesota

- 2026–27 Minnesota Wild season
- Conference: Western
- Division: Central
- Founded: 2000
- History: Minnesota Wild; 2000–present
- Home arena: Grand Casino Arena
- City: Saint Paul, Minnesota
- Team colors: Forest green, iron range red, harvest gold, Minnesota wheat
- Media: Wild+ (via some pay-TV providers, Amazon Prime Video and Fubo); KFAN (100.3 FM)
- Owner: Craig Leipold
- General manager: Bill Guerin
- Head coach: John Hynes
- Captain: Jared Spurgeon
- Minor league affiliates: Iowa Wild (AHL); Jacksonville Icemen (ECHL)
- Stanley Cups: 0
- Conference championships: 0
- Presidents' Trophies: 0
- Division championships: 1 (2007–08)
- Official website: nhl.com/wild

The Minnesota Wild are a professional ice hockey team based in Saint Paul, Minnesota. The Wild compete in the National Hockey League (NHL) as a member of the Central Division in the Western Conference. The team plays its home games at the Grand Casino Arena, and is owned by Craig Leipold. The Wild are affiliated with the Iowa Wild of the American Hockey League (AHL) and the Jacksonville Icemen of the ECHL.

The Wild were founded on June 25, 1997, and began play in the 2000–01 season. The team was founded following the departure of the Minnesota North Stars, who were based in Minnesota from 1967 to 1993, when they relocated to Dallas, Texas, and became the Dallas Stars. The Wild made their first Stanley Cup playoffs appearance in 2003, making a surprise run to the Western Conference finals, but ultimately losing to the Mighty Ducks of Anaheim. The team have appeared in the playoffs a total of 14 times, and have won one division championship, in 2008.

== History ==
=== Preparations of a new franchise ===
Following the departure of the Minnesota North Stars after the 1992–93 season, the state of Minnesota was without an NHL team for seven seasons. Saint Paul mayor (and future U.S. Senator) Norm Coleman began a campaign to either recruit an existing franchise to the city or an expansion franchise to a Minnesota-based ownership group. These efforts came close to success in the mid-1990s when Minnesota interests purchased the original Winnipeg Jets intending to relocate the franchise to Minnesota; however, arena negotiations at the Target Center fell through, and the Jets instead relocated to Phoenix, Arizona.

Following the failed attempt to relocate the Jets, the NHL announced its intention to expand from 26 to 30 teams. Businessman and Minnetonka native Bob Naegele, Jr. became the lead investor for an application to the NHL for an expansion franchise and, ultimately, the first majority owner. On June 25, 1997, the National Hockey League (NHL) announced that Minnesota had been awarded an expansion franchise, to begin play in the 2000–01 season. The six finalist team names for the new NHL franchise (Blue Ox, Freeze, Northern Lights, Voyageurs, White Bears, and Wild), were announced on November 20, 1997. Jac Sperling was named chief executive officer of the Minnesota team, Doug Risebrough was named general manager, Tod Leiweke was named president, and Martha Fuller was named chief financial officer.

The team was officially named the Wild at an unveiling at the Aldrich Arena in suburban Maplewood on January 22, 1998, with the song "Born to Be Wild" by Steppenwolf playing over the arena's speaker system. The State of Minnesota adopted legislation in April 1998 to loan $65 million to the City of Saint Paul to fund 50% of the estimated $130 million project costs for the Xcel Energy Center in Saint Paul. The legislation also provided that only $48 million of the loan needed to be repaid if the team met the requirements to have an agreement in place during the lease term with the Minnesota Amateur Sports Commission. The City of Saint Paul issued an additional $65 million in bonds, with roughly 90% of the debt service on the bonds and the repayment of the state loan coming from scheduled rent and payment instead of taxes from the Minnesota Wild. Deconstruction of the Saint Paul Civic Center began soon after. Designs were announced for the Xcel Energy Center and a groundbreaking ceremony for the Xcel Energy Center was hosted in Saint Paul.

The Minnesota Wild announced a 26-year partnership agreement with the Minnesota Amateur Sports Commission (MASC). The Minnesota Wild-MASC partnership is the first partnership of its kind between a private professional sports team and a public amateur sports organization. Doug Risebrough was named executive vice president/general manager of Minnesota Wild and the Xcel Energy Center, later Grand Casino Arena, was completed and ready for use.

=== Early years (2000–2009) ===
==== Marián Gáborík era ====
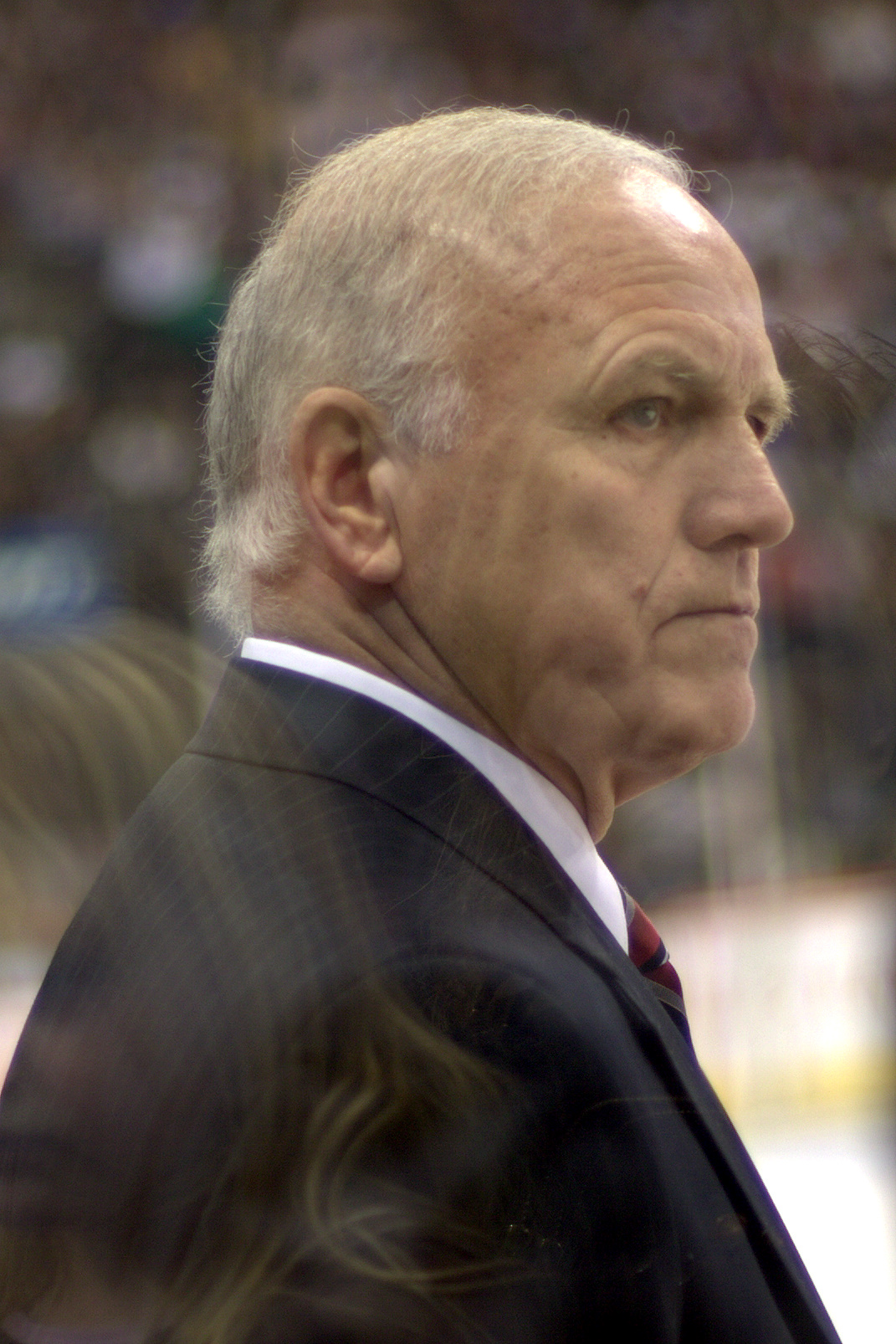
On June 19, 2000, the Minnesota Wild named Jacques Lemaire as their first head coach.

The Wild named Jacques Lemaire their first head coach and the team picked Marián Gáborík third overall in the first round of the 2000 NHL entry draft. Gáborík scored the first-ever goal for the Wild in their franchise debut on October 6 at Anaheim. The Wild played their first-ever home game on October 11 against the Philadelphia Flyers and skated to a 3–3 tie. Minnesota native Darby Hendrickson scored the first-ever home goal for the Wild. Before the game, it was announced the team would retire the number 1 jersey, their first number retirement, with no Wild player ever wearing it, to honor all Minnesota fans, who the team claimed were the true "number one" to them. The most notable game of the year was the first visit of the Dallas Stars, who had formerly played in Minnesota as the Minnesota North Stars. The Wild rode an emotional sellout crowd of over 18,000 to a 6–0 shutout in Dallas' first regular season game in Minnesota since a neutral-site game in 1993. The season ended with Scott Pellerin as the leading scorer with 39 points while Wes Walz, Darby Hendrickson and Gáborík paced the team with 18 goals each.

The Wild got off to a strong start in the 2001–02 season by earning at least one point in their first seven games. However, the Wild finished in last place again with a record of 26–35–12–6. En route, there were signs the Wild were improving, as second-year speedster Gáborík had a solid sophomore season with 30 goals, including an invite to the NHL YoungStars Game, and Andrew Brunette led the team in scoring with 69 points.

Gáborík spent much of the 2002–03 season vying for the league scoring crown before slumping in the second half, and the Wild, in their first-ever playoff appearance, made it to the conference finals before being swept 4–0 by the Mighty Ducks of Anaheim, scoring only one goal against a red hot Jean-Sébastien Giguère. Previously, the Wild had beaten the favored and third-seeded Colorado Avalanche in the first round in seven games, coming back from a 3–1 series deficit and winning both game 6 and 7 in overtime. Brunette scored the series-clinching goal, the last on Patrick Roy. In the conference semifinals, the Wild beat the fourth-seeded Vancouver Canucks, again in seven games, and again after being down 3–1 in a series. In the process, the Wild became the first team in playoff history to capture a seven-game series twice after facing elimination during game 5.

When the 2003–04 season started, the Wild were short-handed with both Pascal Dupuis and Gáborík holding out. After struggling in the first month, the Wild finally got their two young star left-wingers signed, but both struggled to get back into game shape as the Wild struggled through much of November. In a deep hole, the Wild did not make it to the playoffs, despite finishing the season strong, with wins in five of their last six games as they finished last in the competitive Northwest Division with a record of 30–29–20–3. Along the way, the Wild began to gear up for the future, trading away several of their older players who were a part of the franchise from the beginning, including Brad Bombardir and Jim Dowd.

The 2004–05 season was canceled due to an NHL lockout. Former Wild player Sergejs Žoltoks died from a heart condition during a game in Europe. Žoltoks died in the arms of Minnesotan and former Wild player Darby Hendrickson.

==== After the lockout ====
In the 2005–06 season, the first season after the lockout, Minnesota finished in fifth and last place in the Northwest Division, eight points behind fourth-placed Vancouver Canucks. En route, Marián Gáborík set a new franchise record for goals in a season at 38, and Brian Rolston set a new highest point total by a Wild player in a season at 79. The goaltender controversy between Manny Fernandez and Dwayne Roloson ended when Roloson was traded to the Edmonton Oilers for a first-round pick in the 2006 NHL entry draft.

The Wild signed veteran free agents Kim Johnsson, Mark Parrish, Branko Radivojevič and Keith Carney. On the day of the NHL entry draft, it traded the 17th overall pick and prospect Patrick O'Sullivan to the Los Angeles Kings for veteran Slovak Pavol Demitra. Niklas Bäckström was the starting goalie for the Wild after previous starter Manny Fernandez sprained his knee on January 20. Fernandez played for the first time since the sprain on March 6 and was removed after allowing three goals in two periods in the Wild's 3–0 loss to the San Jose Sharks. Josh Harding was brought up from the Wild's AHL affiliate, the Houston Aeros, when Fernandez was hurt and remained on Minnesota's roster for the rest of the season as the backup goalie. All-Star winger Marián Gáborík returned from a groin injury in January 2007 and made an immediate impact, bringing a new spark to a lacking offense. The Wild made the playoffs in 2007 for the second time in team history, but were eliminated by the eventual Stanley Cup champions Anaheim Ducks in the conference quarterfinals.

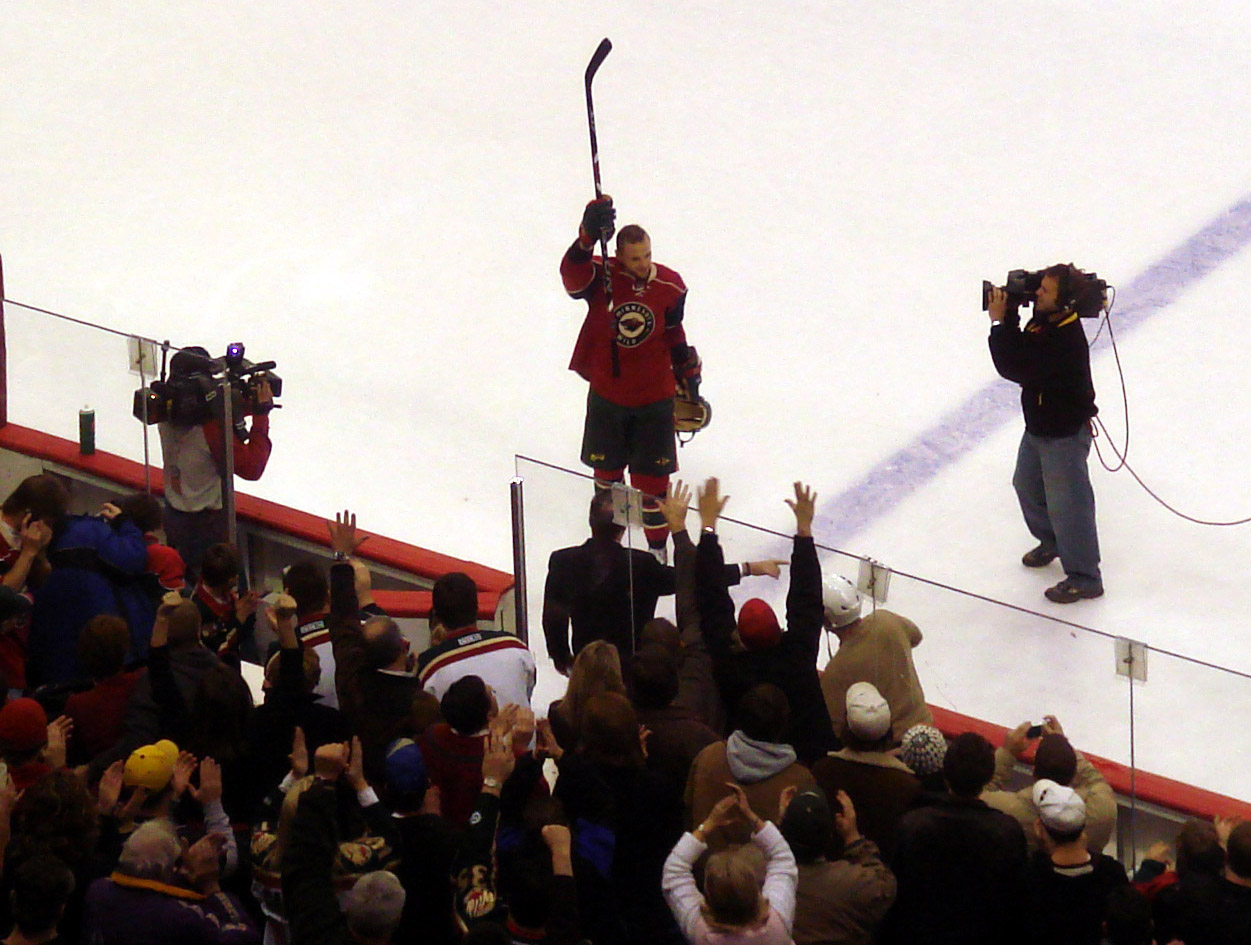
Marián Gáborík waves to the crowd after a five-goal performance against the New York Rangers in the 2007–08 season.

The Wild broke numerous franchise records during the 2007–08 season, including most goals and points (Marián Gáborík – 42 goals and 83 points). Also, Jacques Lemaire recorded his 500th career coaching win as the Wild clinched their first-ever Northwest Division title in a 3–1 victory over the Calgary Flames on April 3, 2008. They again faced the Colorado Avalanche in the conference quarterfinals, and the Wild held home-ice advantage. However, Minnesota came up short, being eliminated in six games by the Avalanche.

During the 2008 off-season, the Wild re-acquired Andrew Brunette from Colorado and traded for defenseman Marek Židlický. The Wild also signed free agents Antti Miettinen and Owen Nolan to multi-year deals. There seemed to be a stigma about Jacques Lemaire's defensive system that caused a number of top free agents to avoid the Wild.

Despite winning the Northwest Division the previous season, the Wild fell to ninth place in the Western Conference in 2008–09, missing the playoffs. Much of this was in part due to a lack of scoring and overall team offense, and the injuries to star forward Marián Gáborík, who only played 17 games. Jacques Lemaire, head coach of the Wild since the team's inception in the 2000–01 season, resigned at season's end. General manager Doug Risebrough was later fired, leading to a nearly complete turnover in the Wild's coaching and hockey management staff.

=== Chuck Fletcher era (2009–2018) ===
==== Mikko Koivu years ====
In the 2009 off-season, Marian Gáborík signed with the New York Rangers during the summer as a free agent. Team owner Craig Leipold hired former Pittsburgh Penguins assistant general manager Chuck Fletcher as general manager. Later that summer, Fletcher selected Todd Richards as head coach. Martin Havlát was signed via free agency after playing the previous three seasons for the Chicago Blackhawks in order to lessen the blow of Gáborík's departure. During the first month of the 2009–10 season, the team announced their first-ever full-time captain, Mikko Koivu. In 2009, Leipold named Matt Majka as chief operating officer of the team.

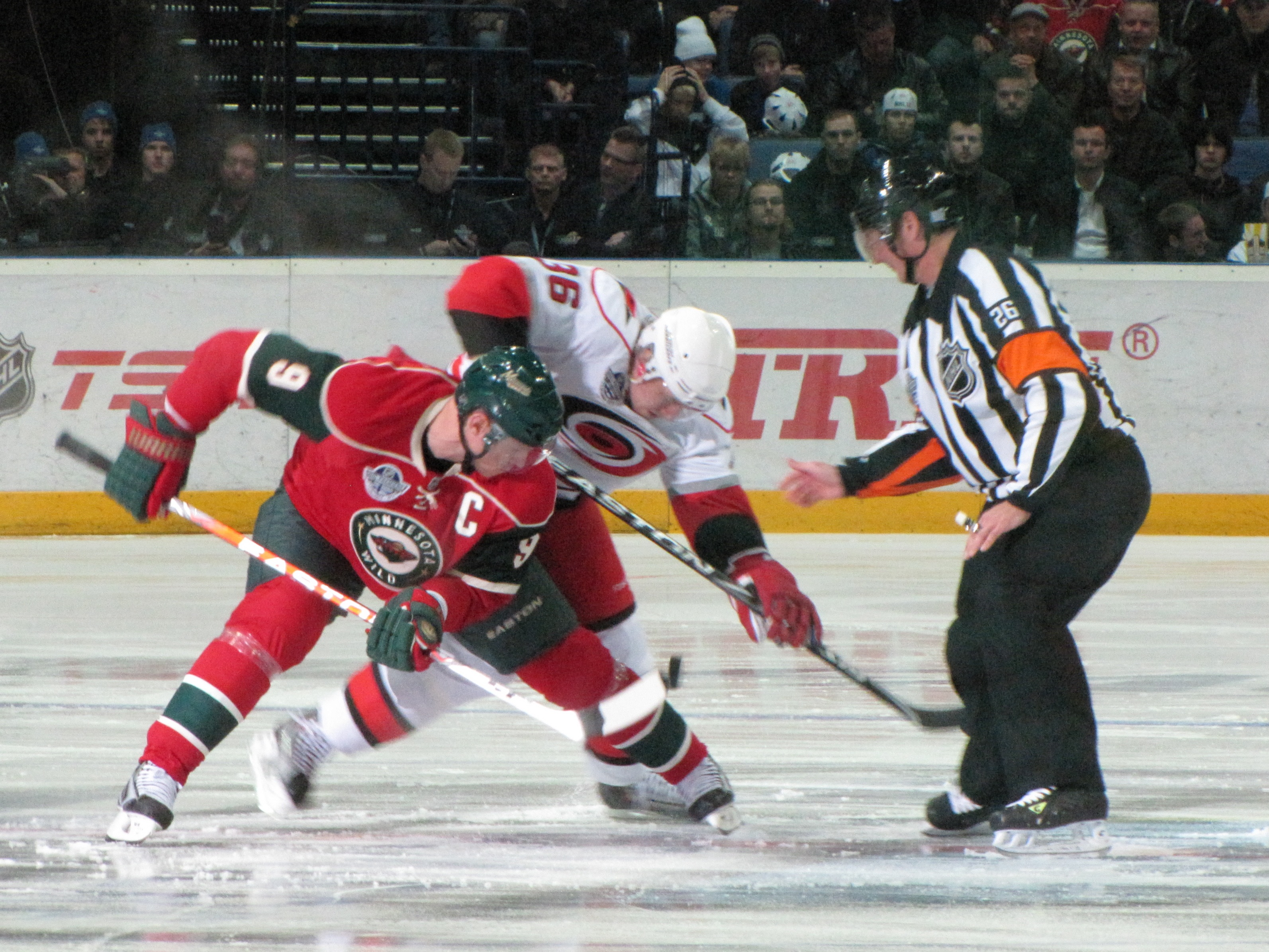
The Wild faced the Carolina Hurricanes at Hartwall Areena in Helsinki to open the 2010–11 season.

The 2009–10 and the 2010–11 seasons ended in disappointment for the Wild as they missed the playoffs in both seasons. In the 2010 NHL entry draft, the Wild held the ninth overall pick and used it to select Finnish forward Mikael Granlund. The Wild opened the 2010–11 season with two games at the Hartwall Areena in Helsinki against the Carolina Hurricanes. Following the 2010–11 season, the team fired head coach Todd Richards due to the team failing to reach the playoffs in his two seasons as head coach with a 77–71–16 record. Mike Yeo, who coached the Wild's AHL affiliate Houston Aeros to a Western Conference title in 2011, was named the new head coach.

During the 2011 NHL entry draft (which the team hosted), the Wild used their tenth overall pick to select Jonas Brodin. The club also created a stir when they traded star defenseman Brent Burns and a second-round pick in 2012 to the San Jose Sharks in exchange for Devin Setoguchi, Charlie Coyle and the 28th overall pick in the 2011 draft, which they used to select Zack Phillips. Later in the off-season, the Wild traded Martin Havlát for Dany Heatley in another blockbuster trade with the Sharks. In November, the team set a franchise record for most wins in one month with 11. Despite a hot start to the season that saw them sitting atop the NHL standings in early December, multiple injuries to key players for extended periods effectively eliminated the team from playoff contention for the fourth consecutive year.

==== Parise–Suter era ====
During the 2012 off-season, the team was able to sign top prospect Mikael Granlund to a three-year, entry-level contract. During the 2012 NHL entry draft, the team selected Matt Dumba with the seventh overall pick. In the same off-season, the Wild also signed unrestricted free agent winger Zach Parise, a Twin Cities native, and defenseman Ryan Suter to identical 13-year, US$98 million contracts. However, the team's busy off-season was overshadowed by the 2012–13 NHL lockout, which ended in January 2013.

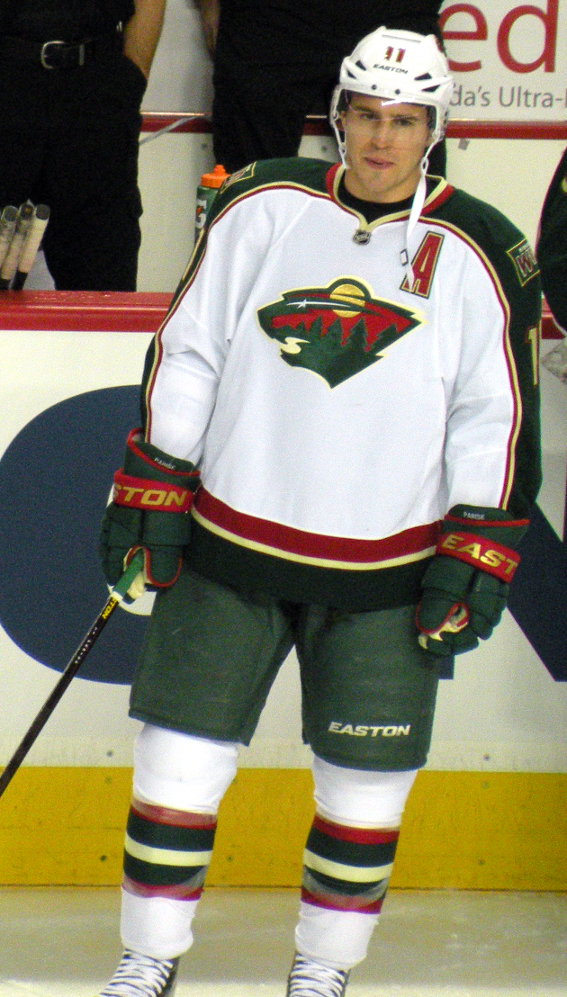
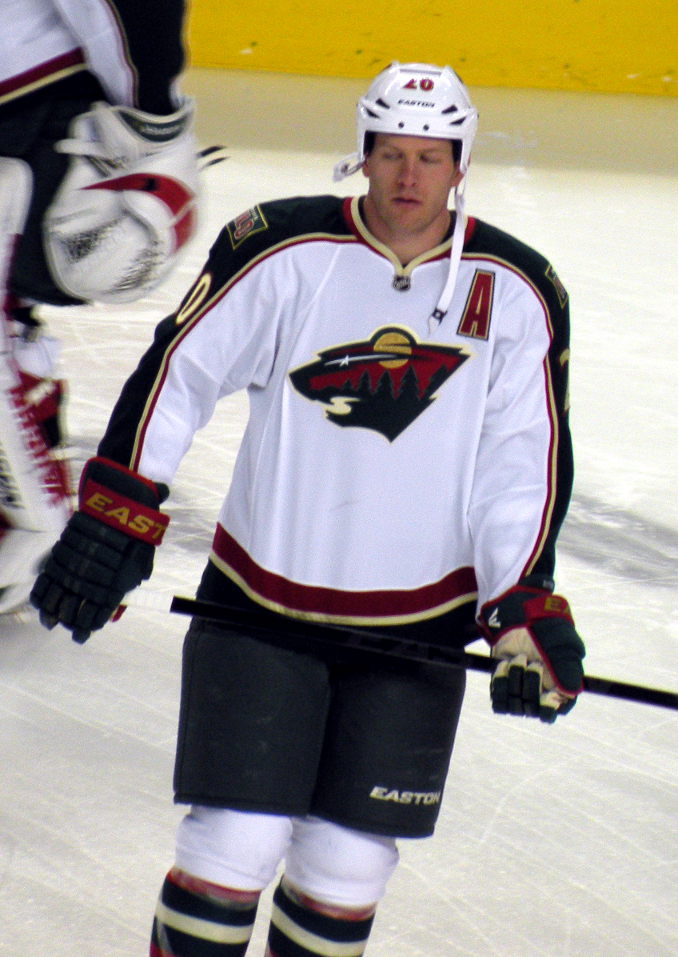
Zach Parise (left) and Ryan Suter (right) during the 2012–13 season. Both players signed identical 13-year contracts as free agents during the 2012 off-season.

Prior to the 2013 trade deadline, the Wild acquired Jason Pominville from the Buffalo Sabres in exchange for prospects Johan Larsson and Matt Hackett, as well as draft picks. The team reached the postseason for the fourth time in franchise history after a 3–1 win over the Colorado Avalanche on April 27, 2013. After finishing in eighth place in the Western Conference, the Wild lost in five games to the eventual Stanley Cup champion Chicago Blackhawks in the first round of the 2013 playoffs.

The relocation and rebranding of the Atlanta Thrashers as the "new" Winnipeg Jets in 2011 meant Winnipeg was once again Minnesota's second-closest geographical rival after Chicago, and led the NHL to reconsider its divisional alignment. Even before the NHL's return to Winnipeg, Wild management had lobbied repeatedly for a move out of the Northwest Division, where they were the only Central Time Zone team. Among the alignments considered was having the Jets replace the Avalanche in the Northwest, but Wild management strongly objected to this alignment as it would have left them as the only American team in their division. Following protracted negotiations both amongst the owners and with the National Hockey League Players' Association, in 2013, the NHL collapsed its six divisions into four and dissolved the Northwest Division. Consequently, the Wild moved into the Central Division along with the Jets and Avalanche; the Canadian teams from the Northwest moved back to the Pacific Division. The Wild now share their division with not only the Blackhawks but also the Dallas Stars, the Wild's predecessors in Minnesota, and the St. Louis Blues, another major rival of the North Stars during the Norris Division era. Thus, the 2013 Blackhawks–Wild playoff series was seen as the rebirth of the old Chicago–Minnesota rivalry in the NHL.

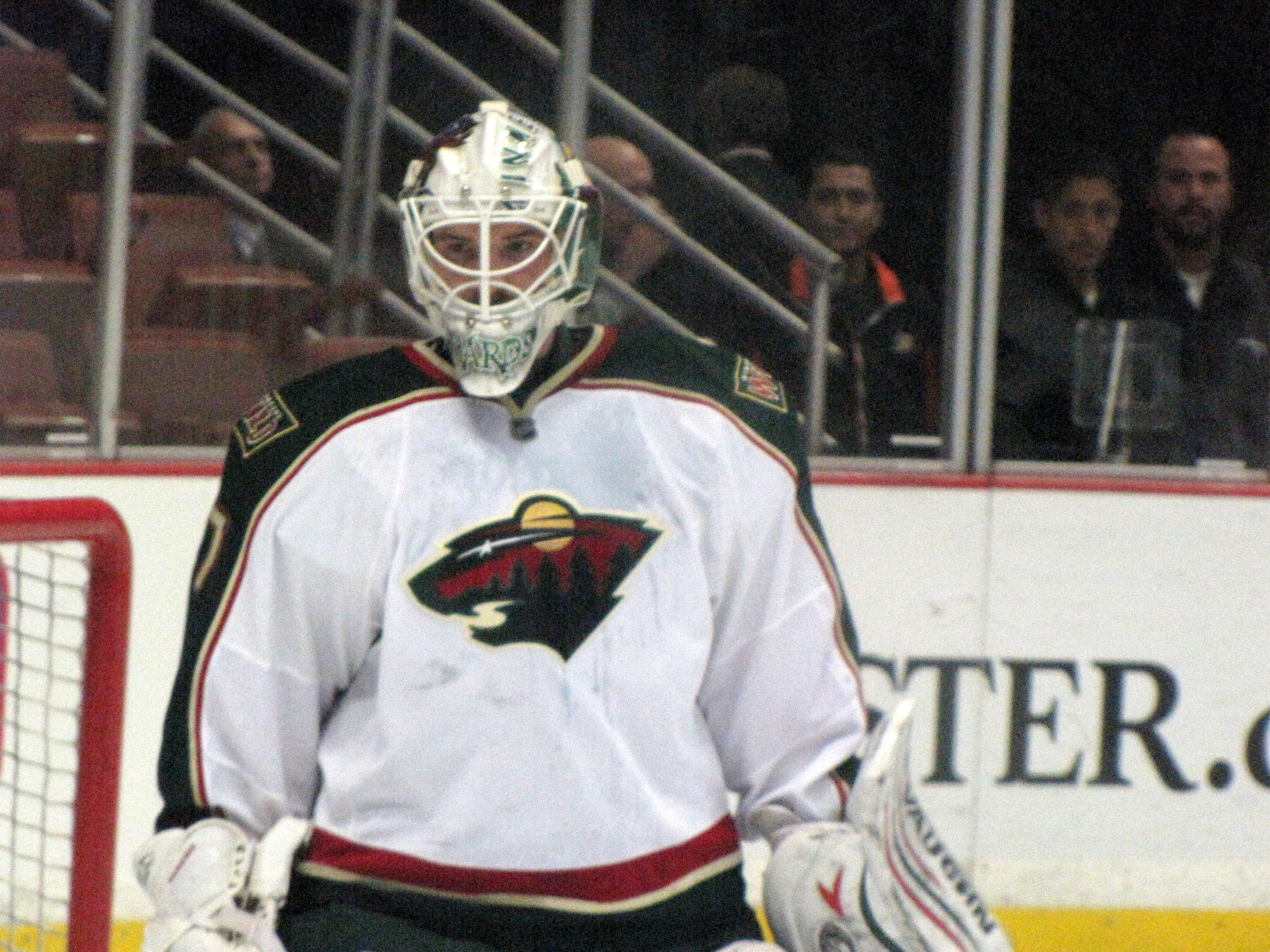
Josh Harding led the NHL in save percentage and goals-against average before succumbing to injuries during the 2013–14 regular season.

The 2013–14 regular season for the Wild was the best the team had since the 2007–08 season, good enough to claim the first Wild Card position. Jason Pominville became the Wild's third player in franchise history to reach the 30-goal mark, with Mikko Koivu surpassing Marian Gaborik in all-time points for the club. The Wild battled goaltender problems throughout the entire season. It began with Josh Harding leading the NHL in save percentage, and goals-against average, before being placed on injured reserve for complications with his multiple sclerosis (MS). Backstrom also suffered a season-ending injury with abdominal issues. The Wild started five different goalies during the year and dressed seven. At the trade deadline, general manager Chuck Fletcher acquired Ilya Bryzgalov from the Edmonton Oilers in exchange for a fourth-round pick, as well as Matt Moulson and Cody McCormick from Buffalo in exchange for Torrey Mitchell and two second-round picks in 2014 and 2016. In the playoffs, the team would face Colorado, who won the Central Division. The Wild won the series four games to three with an overtime goal in game 7 by Nino Niederreiter. The team would then face the defending Stanley Cup champions Chicago, where they were eliminated in six games.

During the 2014 off-season, the Wild signed forward Thomas Vanek as a free agent. Halfway through the 2014–15 season, the Wild were last in their division with an 18–19–5 record. However, a January trade where they acquire goaltender Devan Dubnyk saw them go 27–9–2, resulting in them clinch the first wild card spot in the Western Conference with a 46–28–8 record and 100 points. They then defeated the Central Division champions, the St. Louis Blues, in the first round of the playoffs in six games. Up until 2026, this was the last time Minnesota had won a playoff series. In the second round, the Wild were eliminated in a four-game series sweep by Chicago. Following the loss, forward Matt Cooke said, "Our expectations inside this room were a lot higher than [a] second-round series."

In 2016, the Wild set a franchise record with the best win record in the first 41 games of the season. Immediately afterward, they went into a skid, losing the next 13 of 14 games, culminating in the firing of head coach Mike Yeo. Under new interim head coach John Torchetti, the team snapped the losing streak but remained streaky throughout the rest of the season, managing to barely make the playoffs with a total of 87 points, the worst record of any playoff team in the shootout era (since 2005–06). In the first round, the Wild fell to the Central Division champion Dallas Stars in six games. During the 2016 off-season, the Wild signed free agent Eric Staal to a three-year contract. The Wild also hired Bruce Boudreau as their new head coach, replacing interim head coach John Torchetti.

In 2017, the Wild set their new franchise record for points (106), wins (49) and goals for (266). The Wild set a franchise-record 12-game win streak that was snapped on New Year's Eve 2016 by the Columbus Blue Jackets, a team also on a franchise-record win streak at the time. Despite this success, Minnesota suffered a devastating first round elimination against St. Louis, scoring only eight goals against a red hot Jake Allen as they were eliminated in five games. Mikael Granlund led the team in points with 69, while new addition Eric Staal led the team in goals with 28. Mikko Koivu was a finalist for the Frank J. Selke Trophy for best defensive forward, while Granlund was a finalist for the Lady Byng Trophy.

In the 2017 off-season, the Wild experienced significant roster turnover. Erik Haula was lost to the Vegas Golden Knights in the expansion draft (along with prospect Alex Tuch). Winger Jason Pominville and defenseman Marco Scandella were traded to the Buffalo Sabres in exchange for forwards Tyler Ennis and Marcus Foligno. Minnesota native Matt Cullen was signed as a free agent and returned to the Wild to shore up the fourth line (Cullen had previously played in Minnesota from 2010 to 2013). Captain Mikko Koivu signed a two-year extension, ensuring he would remain with the Wild through the 2019–20 season.

Following another 100-point regular season, the Wild matched up with Central Division rival, the Winnipeg Jets, in the first round of the 2018 playoffs. The Jets defeated the Wild in five games, making it three straight seasons in which the Wild failed to advance past the first round. On April 23, 2018, shortly following the Wild's exit from the playoffs, owner Leipold announced he had fired general manager Fletcher after nine seasons with the team. Under Fletcher's leadership, the Wild qualified for the playoffs six consecutive years, but failed to advance beyond the second round.

=== Rebuilding and the Kirill Kaprizov era (2018–present) ===
On May 21, 2018, Paul Fenton was hired as the third general manager in franchise history. During the 2018–19 season, the Wild struggled to keep up in the ultra-competitive Central Division as they had in previous seasons. Despite a renaissance year from Parise, many key players like Eric Staal and Jason Zucker regressed offensively from the season prior. Many reported that there was dysfunction in the organization, caused by a rift between Fenton, Boudreau and various players, ultimately leading the trading of several core players, such as Mikael Granlund, Charlie Coyle and Nino Niederreiter. The Wild finished the season with 83-points, finishing last in the division and missing the playoffs for the first time since 2012.

In the 2019 off-season, the Wild signed free agent Mats Zuccarello to a five-year contract. On July 30, 2019, Fenton was fired as general manager, just 14 months after being hired to that position. On August 21, 2019, the Wild hired Bill Guerin as the fourth general manager in franchise history. On February 14, 2020, head coach Bruce Boudreau was fired, with Dean Evason named as the interim head coach. Amid the COVID-19 pandemic, the Wild participated in the best-of-five qualifying round of the 2020 Stanley Cup playoffs, but were eliminated in four games at the hands of the Vancouver Canucks. This would be the last time they would have Mikko Koivu on their team.

Kirill Kaprizov played his first NHL game with the Wild in January 2021, scoring the overtime winner against the Los Angeles Kings during his debut. It was a strong rookie season for Kaprizov, as he tallied 51 points in the 56-game season, and eventually won the Calder Memorial Trophy for rookie of the year in the league. The Wild would face off against the Vegas Golden Knights in the first round. Despite coming back from a 3–1 series deficit, Minnesota would lose game seven to Vegas by a score of 6–2. This would be their first ever game seven loss in franchise history.

On September 21, 2021, Kaprizov signed a five-year, $45 million contract with the Wild. As a result of the contract, he became the highest-paid sophomore player in NHL history. During the 2022–22, the team set franchise season highs in points (113) and wins (53). Kaprizov set franchise records in points (108), goals (47), and assists (61), becoming the first Wild player to also set 100 points or higher. They faced the division rival St. Louis Blues in the first round, but despite having home ice advantage and the services of recently acquired goaltender Marc-André Fleury, blew a 2–1 series lead and were eliminated in six games, losing their seventh consecutive playoff series. In the following off-season, forward Kevin Fiala was traded to the Los Angeles Kings in exchange for the draft rights to defenseman Brock Faber, while other notable players such as Nick Bjugstad and Nicolas Deslauriers were lost in free agency.

On July 7, 2022, the Wild traded goaltender Cam Talbot to the Ottawa Senators in exchange for Filip Gustavsson, five days after signing Fleury to a new two-year contract. Despite a second consecutive 40-goal season from Kaprizov, the Wild struggled defensively in the early parts of the season before shifting entirely to lackluster offense and low-scoring games at the end. However, thanks to a stellar season from Gustavsson, the team finished with 103 points, earning third place in the Central Division and setting them up for a playoff matchup against the division rival Dallas Stars. The Wild signed Brock Faber to his entry-level contract shortly before the playoffs began and immediately following the loss of the Minnesota Golden Gophers to the Quinnipiac Bobcats in the 2023 Frozen Four championship game. The Wild were eliminated in six games after, marking their eighth consecutive playoff series loss and their second straight loss after having a 2–1 series lead.

The Wild re-signed Gustavsson in the 2023 off-season but did not make any notable trades or acquisitions, opting instead to "run it back" with the previous year's squad. However, despite breakout performances from Faber and the 2020 ninth overall pick Marco Rossi, as well as Kaprizov's third consecutive 40-goal season, injuries to nearly every player in the starting lineup hindered the team, with key players such as Kaprizov, Joel Eriksson Ek, captain Jared Spurgeon, Marcus Foligno, Mats Zuccarello, and Jonas Brodin all missing substantial time. The Wild finished the season with 87 points, their lowest total since the 2018–19 season, and missed the playoffs for the first time since that year.

During the off-season prior to the start of the 2024–25 campaign, Fleury resigned with the Wild with his intention on it being his last season before retirement. Minnesota started off as one of the best teams in the league for the first half of the season. However, injuries to Kaprizov saw them slip down from a top three spot in the conference to the first wild card spot. Kaprizov would however be back in time for the playoffs, where the Wild suffered their ninth consecutive first round exit, losing to Vegas in six games after blowing their third consecutive 2–1 series lead.

On September 30, 2025, with one week before the start of the 2025–26 season, Kaprizov would sign an eight-year, $136 million contract to stay with the Wild, becoming the highest paid player in NHL history.

==== Arrival of Quinn Hughes ====
On December 12, 2025, the Wild acquired defenseman Quinn Hughes in exchange for forwards Marco Rossi and Liam Öhgren, defenseman Zeev Buium and a 2026 first-round pick. It was widely described as the most significant trade in franchise history, adding the 2023-24 Norris Trophy winner to a team sitting top three in the Western Conference.

During the playoffs that season, the Wild would face their divisional rivals in the Dallas Stars in the first round, defeating Dallas in six games to win their first playoff series since 2015 thanks to players like Hughes and their star rookie netminder Jesper Wallstedt. They would go on to the Presidents' Trophy-winning Colorado Avalanche in the second round, where injuries sustained during the Dallas series to key players Joel Eriksson Ek and Jonas Brodin saw Minnesota go down 3–1 in the series. However, during Game 5 of that series, the Wild, facing elimination, jumped to a 3–0 lead over the Avalanche in the first period, chasing their goaltender Mackenzie Blackwood. Unfortunately for Minnesota, with a 3–1 lead and only minutes remaining in regulation, they surrendered two late goals to send the game to overtime. The Wild had managed to outshoot the Avalanche 13-12 in the first period, but since Scott Wedgewood replaced Blackwood for Colorado to start the second period, Minnesota only managed seven shots on net for the remainder of the game. All of this culminated in Colorado defenseman Brett Kulak eliminating the Wild with a 4–3 overtime win for the Avalanche.

== Team information ==
=== Jerseys ===
==== 2000–2007 ====
For its first seven years in the NHL, the Wild wore a uniform of either a green or white jersey with red and gold stripes and the primary logo on the front of the jersey. The shoulder patch was a circle with "Minnesota Wild" read in distinctive lettering from both words. The name and numbering on the green jersey would be gold with red outlining while on the white jersey it was red with gold outlining. In 2003–04, with the NHL reversing the convention regarding the home and road jersey colors, the green jersey became the home jersey while the white one became the road jersey.

==== 2007–2017 ====
In the 2007–08 season, when all jerseys were converted to the new Reebok Edge uniform system, the white jersey was retained and the home jersey replaced with a new one that has a small imprint of the team's primary logo inside a white circle, which is surrounded by the words "Minnesota Wild" in a larger ring against a green background. The rest of the jersey is predominantly red, with additional swatches of green on the sleeves outlined with wheat. The away jersey uses a larger version of the primary logo without the concentric circles on a predominantly white jersey; in 2013, the lettering was updated to match the home and alternate sweaters, at the same time updating the sweater's look to a more traditional design. On August 30, 2009, the team unveiled another third/alternate jersey, which is predominantly green with wheat accents. It says "Minnesota Wild" in script writing across the chest.

On April 4, 2017, the Wild honored the Minnesota North Stars by wearing North Stars jerseys for warm-ups, despite the North Stars history belonging to the Dallas Stars. Martin Hanzal warmed up with number 91, as the North Stars retired number 19 in honor of Bill Masterton.

==== 2017–present ====
On June 20, 2017, the Wild introduced a new home uniform, as the NHL switched from Reebok to Adidas – a green jersey with their main logo, and a wheat-colored stripe through the center of the jersey. On the arms is a wheat-colored stripe with a smaller red stripe near the top of it. The Wild kept its away jersey design the same. The Wild, along with the rest of the NHL, did not have an alternate jersey for the 2017–18 season.

On September 23, 2023, the Wild unveiled an alternate green jersey based on the "Reverse Retro" look they wore the previous season (see below). This set added a right shoulder patch featuring a recolored "State of Hockey" alternate logo and captaincy patches shaped after the Minnesota state outline. This was the first time that Wild had an official alternate jersey since 2017.

==== Reverse Retro jersey ====
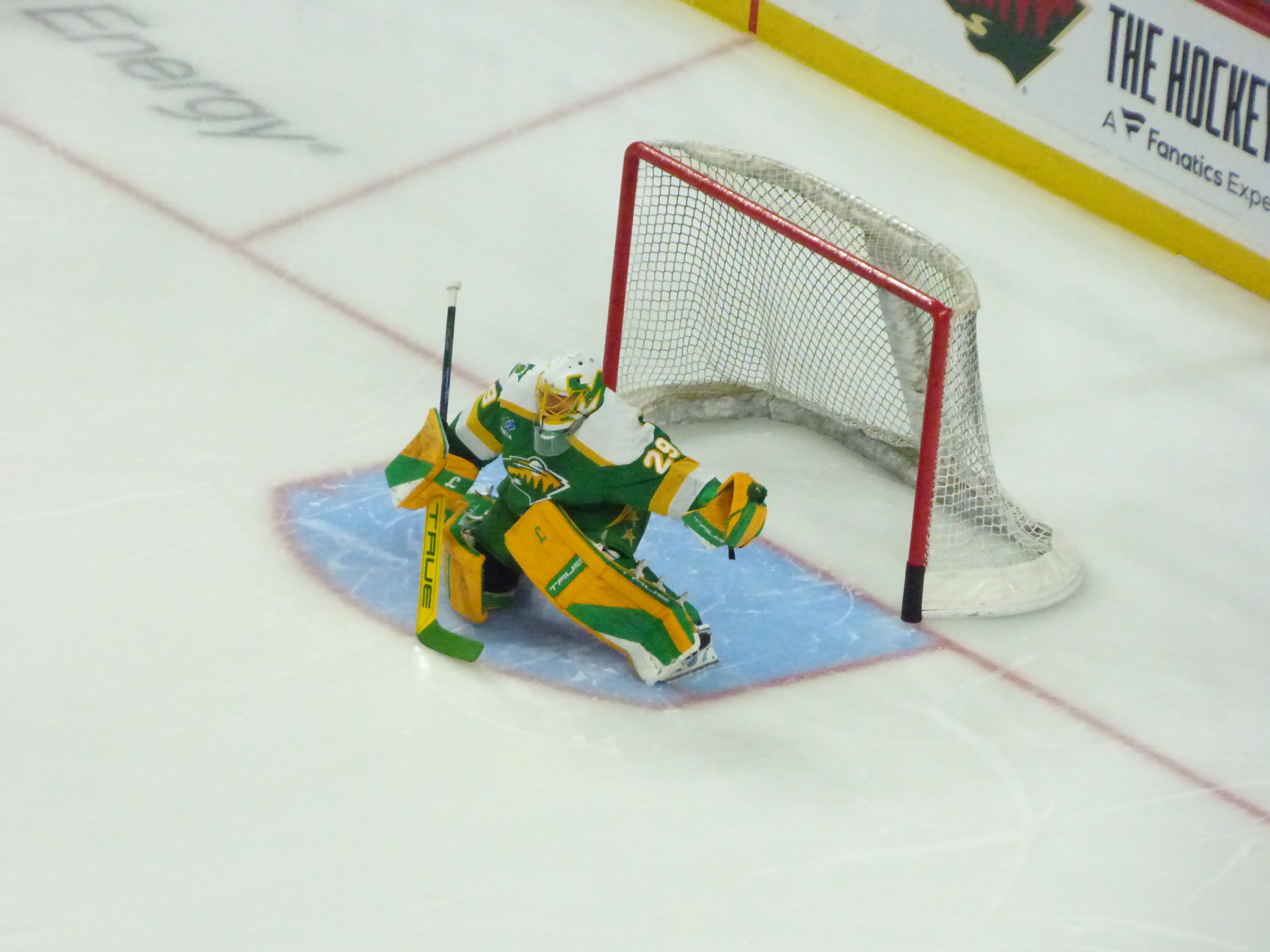
Marc-André Fleury wearing the green "Reverse Retro" uniform in 2022, which would become their alternate the following season.

In the 2020–21 season, the Wild unveiled a "Reverse Retro" jersey in collaboration with Adidas. The uniform was a callback to the late 1970s Minnesota North Stars white uniform, with the Wild logo recolored to match the team's green and gold scheme. This design was reused again in the 2022–23 season, but with green now the base color.

==== Winter Classic jersey ====
For the 2022 Winter Classic, the Wild unveiled a special edition jersey inspired by various early Minnesota hockey teams. The jersey is primarily green with red shoulder yoke and red and wheat stripes. The front of the uniforms featured the Minneapolis–Saint Paul (MPLS.–ST. PAUL) identifier around three symbols: a red Minnesota state silhouette with "MN" inside, and two wheat stars referencing Gemini, the twin constellation. Brown gloves and pants were used to reflect early 20th century hockey gear.

==== 25th Anniversary jersey ====
During the 2025–26 season, the Wild brought back their original 2000–2013 white jersey for four games to commemorate the franchise's 25th anniversary in the NHL.

==== Hometown Remix jersey ====
In the 2026–27 season, the Wild wore an alternate "Hometown Remix" uniform, featuring a black base and green and white stripes. The Wild logo crest was recolored to feature only black, green and white details.

=== Goal horn and songs ===
The team has had a goal horn each season since its inception. The Wild are one of the few teams to not blast their goal horn whenever they score in a shootout.

The team's first goal songs were "Born to Be Wild" and "Rock and Roll Part 2", which were used in the inaugural 2000–01 season. The following season, the team removed "Born to Be Wild" but kept "Rock and Roll Part 2" through 2004, before the lockout. After the lockout in 2005, the Wild used a cover of "Rock and Roll Part 1" for the 2005–06 season. For the 2006–07 season, the team changed its goal song to "Crowd Chant" by Joe Satriani shortly after its release. After pop legend and Minneapolis native Prince died in April 2016, the team held a tribute to him at game 6 of the 2016 Stanley Cup playoffs game against the Dallas Stars, and adopted "Let's Go Crazy" as their goal song. After a fan poll, the team permanently used "Let's Go Crazy" with the goal horn starting in the 2016–17 season. The Wild kept "Crowd Chant" as their win song. For the 2018–19 season, the team brought back "Crowd Chant" as its goal song and "Let's Go Crazy" became the win song, followed by the singing of the team fight song "The State of Hockey". For the pandemic-shortened season, the team used "Jump Around" by House of Pain as their goal song. In the 2021-22 season, the Wild used "Shout" by The Isley Brothers as their goal song. "Let's Go Crazy" remains the win song.

=== Logo ===
An alternate logo since 2003.

The logo depicts both a forest landscape and the silhouette of a wild animal. The "eye" of the "wild animal" is the north star, in tribute to the departed Minnesota North Stars as well as the state's motto L'Étoile du Nord, meaning "The Star of the North". The mouth of the animal represents the Mississippi River, which starts in Minnesota. According to The Good Point, questions surrounding the identity of the animal depicted have sparked debate amongst logo enthusiasts, earning accolades for its unique complexity in North American professional sports.

=== Mascot ===
In 2008, "Nordy" was introduced as the official mascot of the team. Nordy is depicted as a wild animal with a mullet and stylized letter M on his forehead.

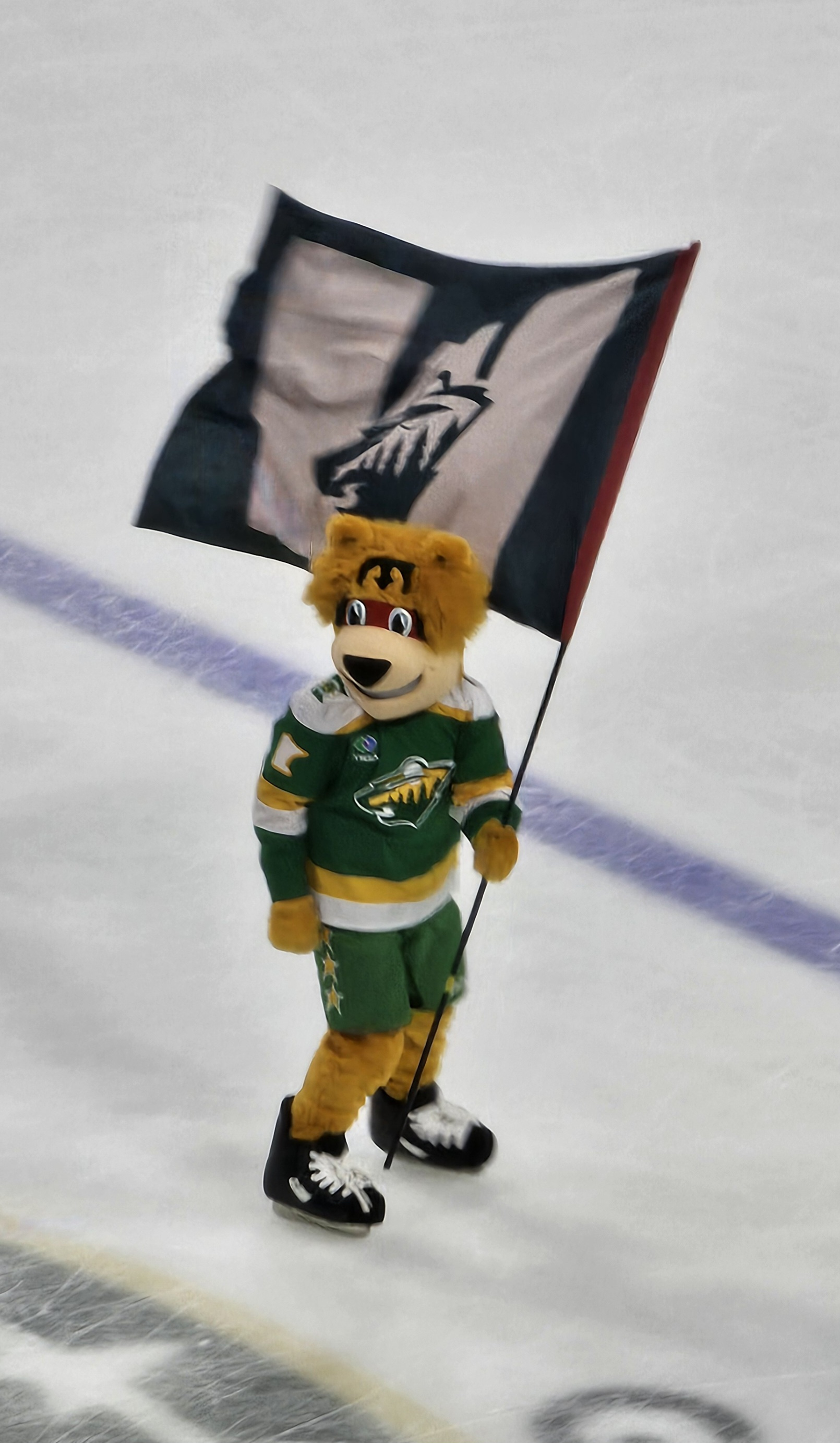
Nordy

=== Ownership ===
The franchise was originally owned by a limited partnership formed by former majority owner Bob Naegele, Jr. of Naegele Sports, LLC in 1997. On January 10, 2008, it was announced the franchise was being sold to former Nashville Predators owner Craig Leipold. The NHL's Board of Governors officially approved Leipold's purchase of Minnesota Sports & Entertainment (MSE) on April 10, 2008. Leipold, a resident of Racine, Wisconsin, completed the sale of the Nashville Predators to a local ownership group on December 7, 2007, a team he owned since the expansion franchise was awarded to Nashville in 1997.

Leipold is the majority owner and principal investor in MSE, a regional sports and entertainment leader that includes the NHL's Minnesota Wild, its AHL affiliate the Iowa Wild of the American Hockey League, Wildside Caterers and 317 on Rice Park. He also serves as the team's Governor at NHL Board of Governors' meetings. After his purchase of MSE, Mr. Leipold sold the Georgia Swarm to John Arlotta. Along with the Wild, the group has year-round management rights of the Grand Casino Arena, and currently has a contract to manage the adjoining Saint Paul RiverCentre and Roy Wilkins Auditorium; in addition, the partnership also owns and operates 317 on Rice Park, a historic former Minnesota club.

=== Community involvement ===
The Minnesota Wild stay involved in the community through the philanthropic activities of the Minnesota Wild Foundation and its operations to support the game of hockey with events such as Hockey Day Minnesota. It has been celebrated every year since 2007. The Wild are 13-2-1 on Hockey Day Minnesota. Started in 2017, the Wild unveiled a new tradition called This Is Our Ice which encourages Wild fans to bring water from local ponds, lakes and rinks and add it to the Grand Casino Arena ice. Fans can bring water to any regular season home game and add it to the collection station which will then be added to the ice for the season.

== Minor league affiliates ==
Minnesota currently has two minor league affiliates: the Iowa Wild of the American Hockey League (AHL) and the Jacksonville Icemen of the ECHL. The Iowa Wild is owned by the parent club, who relocated the franchise from Houston in 2013.

=== Former minor league affiliates ===
- Alaska Aces
- Allen Americans
- Austin Ice Bats
- Bakersfield Condors
- Cleveland Lumberjacks
- Houston Aeros
- Iowa Heartlanders
- Johnstown Chiefs
- Louisiana IceGators
- Mississippi Sea Wolves
- Orlando Solar Bears
- Quad City Mallards
- Rapid City Rush
- Texas Wildcatters

== Season-by-season record ==
This is a partial list of the last five seasons completed by the Wild. For the full season-by-season history, see List of Minnesota Wild seasons

Note: GP = Games played, W = Wins, L = Losses, T = Ties, OTL = Overtime Losses, Pts = Points, GF = Goals for, GA = Goals against

Season	GP	W	L	OTL	Pts	GF	GA	Finish	Playoffs
2021–22	82	53	22	7	113	310	253	2nd, Central	Lost in first round, 2–4 (Blues)
2022–23	82	46	25	11	103	246	225	3rd, Central	Lost in first round, 2–4 (Stars)
2023–24	82	39	34	9	87	251	263	6th, Central	Did not qualify
2024–25	82	45	30	7	97	228	239	4th, Central	Lost in first round, 2–4 (Golden Knights)
2025–26	82	46	24	12	104	272	240	3rd, Central	Lost in second round, 1–4 (Avalanche)

== Players and personnel ==
=== Current roster ===
Updated October 29, 2026

No.	Nat	Player	Pos	S/G	Age	Acquired	Birthplace
24	(United States)	Zach Bogosian	D	R	36	2023	Massena, New York
12	(United States)	Matt Boldy	RW	L	25	2019	Millis, Massachusetts
10	(United States)	Bobby Brink	RW	R	25	2026	Minnetonka, Minnesota
25	(Sweden)	Jonas Brodin	D	L	33	2011	Karlstad, Sweden
20	(United States)	Blake Coleman	LW	L	34	2026	Plano, Texas
34	(Canada)	Cameron Crotty	D	R	27	2026	Ottawa, Ontario
14	(Sweden)	Joel Eriksson Ek	C	L	29	2015	Karlstad, Sweden
7	(United States)	Brock Faber	D	R	24	2022	Maple Grove, Minnesota
17	(United States)	Marcus Foligno (A)	RW	L	35	2017	Buffalo, New York
71	(United States)	Nick Foligno	LW	L	39	2026	Buffalo, New York
32	(Sweden)	Filip Gustavsson	G	L	28	2022	Skellefteå, Sweden
38	(United States)	Ryan Hartman	C	R	32	2019	Hilton Head Island, South Carolina
43	(United States)	Quinn Hughes	D	L	27	2025	Orlando, Florida
97	(Russia)	Kirill Kaprizov (A)	LW	L	29	2015	Novokuznetsk, Russia
26	(United States)	Matt Kiersted	D	L	28	2025	Elk River, Minnesota
55	(Canada)	Carson Lambos	D	L	23	2021	Winnipeg, Manitoba
3	(Finland)	Olli Määttä	D	L	32	2026	Jyväskylä, Finland
47	(United States)	Michael McCarron	C	R	31	2026	Grosse Pointe, Michigan
31	(Canada)	Calvin Pickard	G	L	34	2026	Moncton, New Brunswick
19	(United States)	Tyler Pitlick	C	R	35	2025	Minneapolis, Minnesota
49	(Russia)	Maxim Shabanov	RW	L	26	2026	Chelyabinsk, Russia
18	(Canada)	Mason Shaw	C	L	28	2026	Lloydminster, Alberta
82	(Czech Republic)	David Spacek	D	R	23	2022	Columbus, Ohio
46	(Canada)	Jared Spurgeon (C)	D	R	36	2010	Edmonton, Alberta
78	(Germany)	Nico Sturm	C	L	31	2025	Augsburg, Germany
13	(Russia)	Yakov Trenin	C	R	29	2024	Chelyabinsk, Russia
30	(Sweden)	Jesper Wallstedt	G	L	23	2021	Västerås, Sweden
22	(Russia)	Danila Yurov	RW	L	22	2022	Chelyabinsk, Russia

=== Team captains ===
Note: The Wild rotated the captaincy for their first nine seasons on a monthly basis among several of its players each season, with some players serving multiple times under Jacques Lemaire. After Todd Richards became head coach for the start of the 2009–10 season, Mikko Koivu, who was the last rotating captain and has had the captaincy three different times in the 2008–09 season, became the franchise's first permanent captain on October 20, 2009.

Rotating, 2000–2009

- 2000–01
  - Sean O'Donnell – October 2000
  - Scott Pellerin – November 2000
  - Wes Walz – December 2000
  - Brad Bombardir – January and February 2001
  - Darby Hendrickson – March and April 2001
- 2001–02
  - Jim Dowd – October 2001
  - Filip Kuba – November 2001
  - Brad Brown – December 2001 and January 2002
  - Andrew Brunette – February, March and April 2002
- 2002–03
  - Brad Bombardir – October and November 2002, February, March, April and playoffs 2003
  - Matt Johnson – December 2002
  - Sergei Zholtok – January 2003
- 2003–04
  - Brad Brown – October 2003
  - Andrew Brunette – November 2003, March and April 2004
  - Richard Park – December 2003
  - Brad Bombardir – January 2004
  - Jim Dowd – February 2004
- 2005–06
  - Alex Henry – September 2005
  - Filip Kuba – November 2005
  - Willie Mitchell – December 2005 and January 2006
  - Brian Rolston – February 2006
  - Wes Walz – March and April 2006
- 2006–07
  - Brian Rolston – October, November 2006 and January 2007
  - Keith Carney – December 2006
  - Mark Parrish – February, March, April and playoffs 2007
- 2007–08
  - Pavol Demitra – October 2007
  - Brian Rolston – November 2007
  - Mark Parrish – December 2007
  - Nick Schultz – January 2008
  - Mikko Koivu – February 2008
  - Marián Gáborík – March and April 2008
- 2008–09
  - Mikko Koivu – October, November 2008, January 2009, March and April 2009
  - Kim Johnsson – December 2008
  - Andrew Brunette – February 2009

Permanent, 2009–present

- Mikko Koivu, 2009–2020
- Jared Spurgeon, 2021–present

=== Retired numbers ===
The NHL retired Wayne Gretzky's No. 99 for all its member teams at the 2000 NHL All-Star Game.

Minnesota Wild retired numbers
No.	Player	Position	Career	Date of honor
1	Wild Fans			October 11, 2000
9	Mikko Koivu	C	2005–2020	March 13, 2022

=== Hall of Famers ===
As of 2024, no member of the Minnesota Wild has been inducted into the Hockey Hall of Fame, although the team has been coached by a member of the Hall with Jacques Lemaire (inducted as a player in 1985).

=== First-round draft picks ===
- 2000: Marián Gáborík (3rd overall)
- 2001: Mikko Koivu (6th overall)
- 2002: Pierre-Marc Bouchard (8th overall)
- 2003: Brent Burns (20th overall)
- 2004: A. J. Thelen (12th overall)
- 2005: Benoît Pouliot (4th overall)
- 2006: James Sheppard (9th overall)
- 2007: Colton Gillies (16th overall)
- 2008: Tyler Cuma (23rd overall)
- 2009: Nick Leddy (16th overall)
- 2010: Mikael Granlund (9th overall)
- 2011: Jonas Brodin (10th overall), Zack Phillips (28th overall)
- 2012: Matt Dumba (7th overall)
- 2014: Alex Tuch (18th overall)
- 2015: Joel Eriksson Ek (20th overall)
- 2016: Luke Kunin (15th overall)
- 2018: Filip Johansson (24th overall)
- 2019: Matt Boldy (12th overall)
- 2020: Marco Rossi (9th overall)
- 2021: Jesper Wallstedt (20th overall), Carson Lambos (26th overall)
- 2022: Liam Ohgren (19th overall), Danila Yurov (24th overall)
- 2023: Charlie Stramel (21st overall)
- 2024: Zeev Buium (12th overall)

== Awards and trophies ==
Bill Masterton Memorial Trophy

- Josh Harding: 2012–13
- Devan Dubnyk: 2014–15

Calder Memorial Trophy

- Kirill Kaprizov: 2020–21

Jack Adams Award

- Jacques Lemaire: 2002–03

Roger Crozier Saving Grace Award

- Niklas Bäckström: 2006–07
- Dwayne Roloson: 2003–04

King Clancy Memorial Trophy

- Matt Dumba: 2019–20
- Jason Zucker: 2018–19

William M. Jennings Trophy

- Manny Fernandez and Niklas Bäckström: 2006–07

NHL first All-Star team

- Ryan Suter: 2012–13

NHL second All-Star team

- Devan Dubnyk: 2014–15

NHL All-Rookie Team

- Jonas Brodin: 2012–13
- Kirill Kaprizov: 2020–21
- Brock Faber: 2023–24

== Franchise records ==
=== Scoring leaders ===
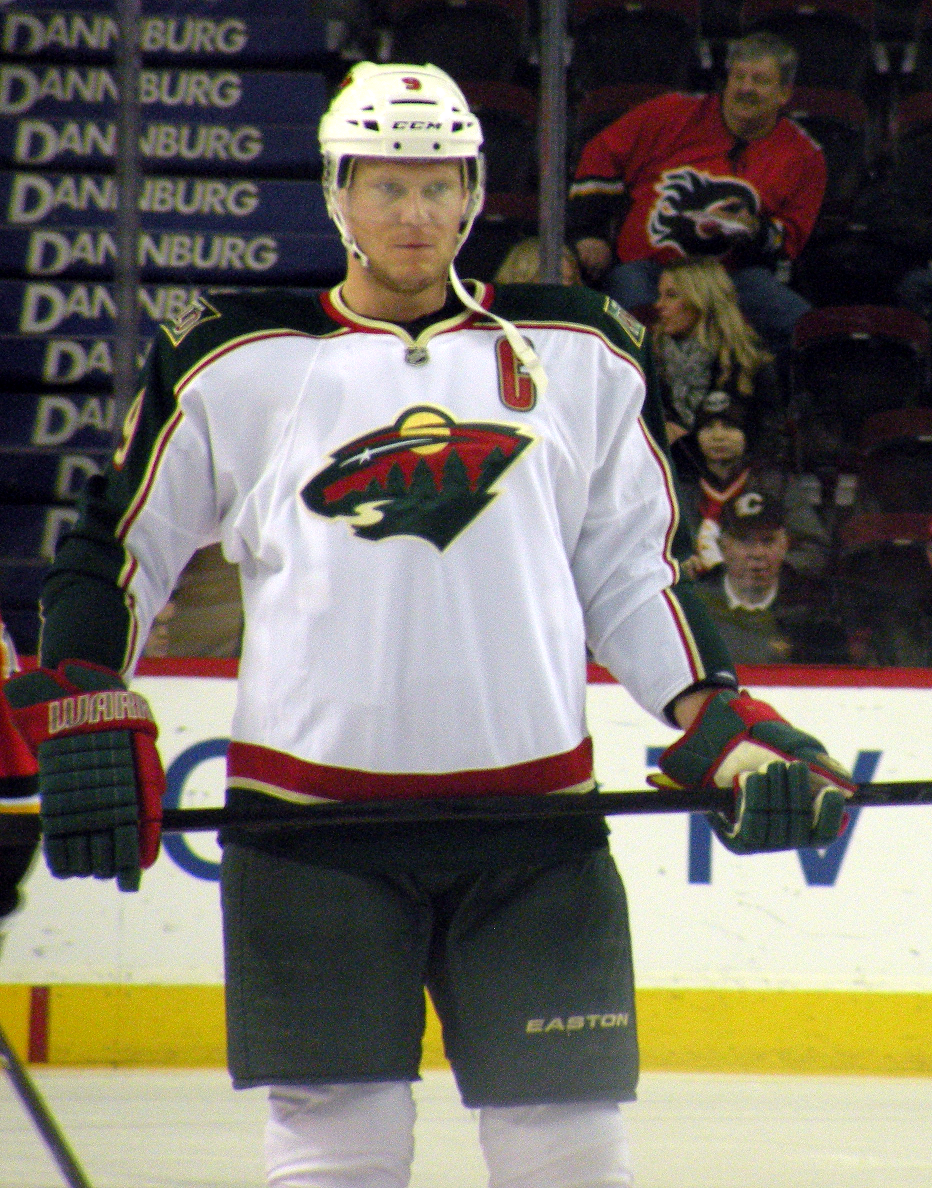
Recording 709 points as a member of the Wild, Mikko Koivu is the franchise's all-time point leaders.

These are the top-ten point-scorers in franchise history. Figures are updated after each completed NHL regular season.

- * – current Wild player

Note: Pos = Position; GP = Games Played; G = Goals; A = Assists; Pts = Points; P/G = Points per game

Points
Player	Pos	GP	G	A	Pts	P/G
Mikko Koivu	C	1,028	205	504	709	.69
Kirill Kaprizov*	LW	397	230	245	475	1.20
Jared Spurgeon*	D	1,012	123	315	438	.43
Marián Gáborík	RW	502	219	218	437	.87
Zach Parise	LW	558	199	201	400	.72
Mats Zuccarello	RW	452	118	271	389	.86
Ryan Suter	D	656	55	314	369	.56
Joel Eriksson Ek*	C	614	155	195	350	.57
Pierre-Marc Bouchard	C	565	106	241	347	.61
Matt Boldy*	LW	361	144	185	329	.91

Goals
Player	Pos	G
Kirill Kaprizov*	LW	230
Marián Gáborík	RW	219
Mikko Koivu	C	205
Zach Parise	LW	199
Joel Eriksson Ek*	C	155
Matt Boldy*	LW	144
Jason Zucker	LW	132
Jared Spurgeon*	D	123
Ryan Hartman*	RW	120
Andrew Brunette	LW	119

Assists
Player	Pos	A
Mikko Koivu	C	504
Jared Spurgeon*	D	315
Ryan Suter	D	314
Mats Zuccarello	RW	271
Kirill Kaprizov*	LW	245
Pierre-Marc Bouchard	C	241
Mikael Granlund	C	224
Marián Gáborík	RW	218
Jonas Brodin*	D	216
Andrew Brunette	LW	202

=== Goaltending leaders ===
These are the top-ten goaltenders in franchise history by wins. Figures are updated after each completed NHL regular season.

- * – current Wild player

Note: GP = Games played; W = Wins; L = Losses; T/O = Ties/Overtime losses; GA = Goal against; GAA = Goals against average; SA = Shots against; SV% = Save percentage; SO = Shutouts

Goaltenders
Player	GP	W	L	T/O	GA	GAA	SA	SV%	SO
Niklas Bäckström	409	194	142	50	962	2.48	11,283	.915	28
Devan Dubnyk	328	177	113	28	760	2.41	9,230	.918	23
Manny Fernandez	260	113	102	28	614	2.47	7,102	.914	12
Filip Gustavsson*	192	101	61	23	489	2.61	5,526	.912	15
Marc-André Fleury	123	64	42	10	335	2.90	3,427	.902	5
Dwayne Roloson	167	62	71	27	367	2.28	4,548	.919	15
Josh Harding	151	60	59	11	327	2.45	3,984	.918	10
Cam Talbot	82	51	20	9	218	2.71	2,496	.913	5
Darcy Kuemper	102	41	34	14	236	2.60	2,608	.910	7
Alex Stalock	89	37	30	11	224	2.77	2,448	.908	5

=== Individual records ===
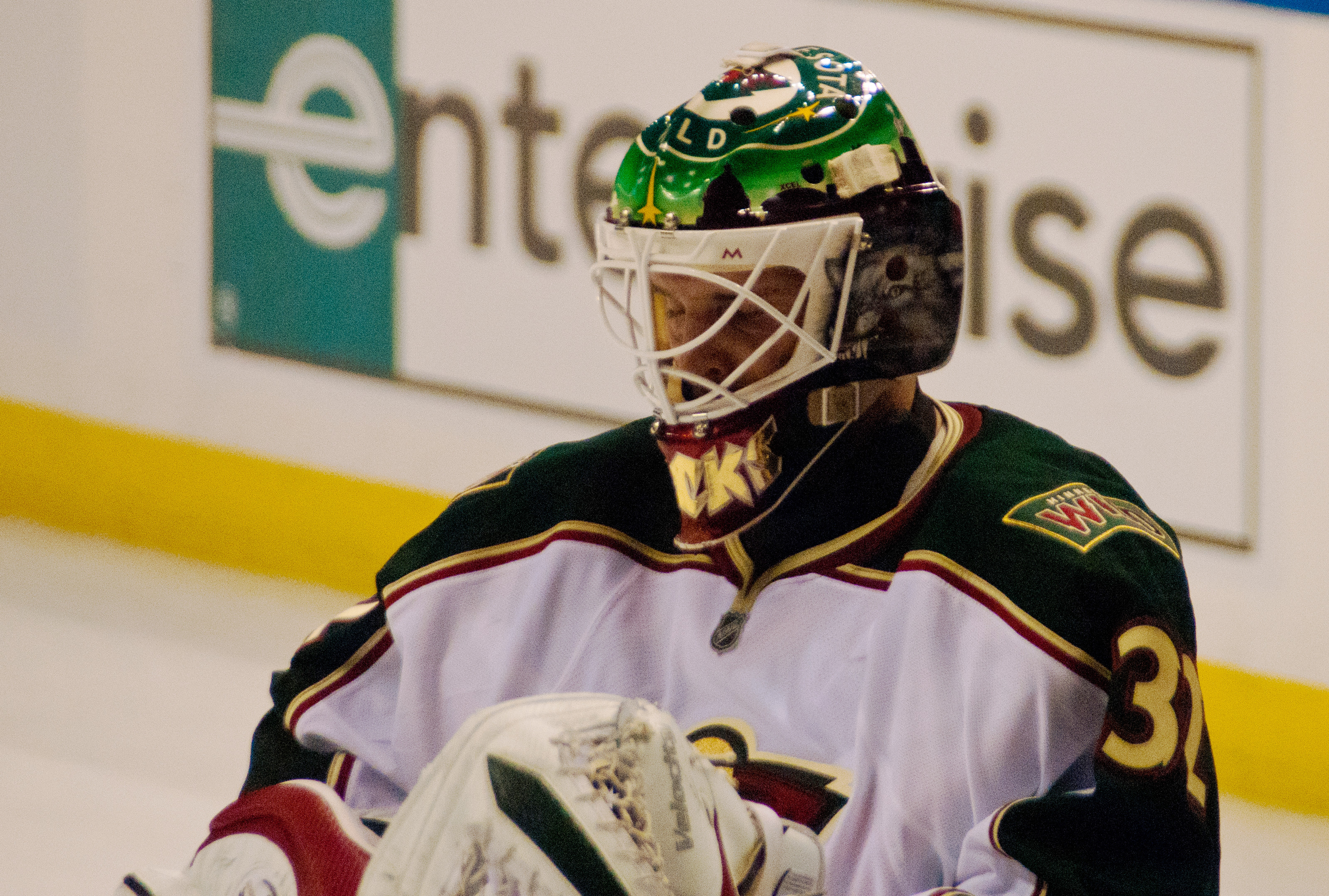
Niklas Bäckström holds the franchise record for most wins, winning 194 games as the Wild's goaltender.

- Most games played with franchise: 1,028, Mikko Koivu (2005–20)
- Most goals in a season: 47, Kirill Kaprizov (2021–22)
- Most assists in a season: 61, Kirill Kaprizov (2021–22)
- Most points in a season: 108, Kirill Kaprizov (2021–22)
- Most penalty minutes in a season: 201, Matt Johnson (2002–03)
- Most points in a season, defenseman: 51, Ryan Suter (2015–16, 2017–18)
- Most points in a season, rookie: 51, Kirill Kaprizov (2020–21)
- Most goals in a game: 5, Marián Gáborík (December 20, 2007, vs. New York Rangers)
- Fastest 3 goals: 11:12, Zach Parise (2015–16)
- Most wins: 194, Niklas Bäckström
- Most wins in a season: 40, Devan Dubnyk (2016–17)
- Most shutouts in a season: 8, Niklas Bäckström (2008–09),
- Best +/- in a season: +41, Alex Goligoski (2021–22)
- Most time on ice per game in a season: 29:25, Ryan Suter, (2013–14)
- Most consecutive starts for goaltender: 38, Devan Dubnyk, (January 15, 2015 – April 7, 2015)
- Most consecutive shutouts: 3, Devan Dubnyk

== See also ==
- List of Minnesota Wild general managers
- List of Minnesota Wild head coaches
- List of Minnesota Wild players
- List of Minnesota Wild broadcasters
