= Bill Guerin =

American ice hockey player and executive (born 1970)

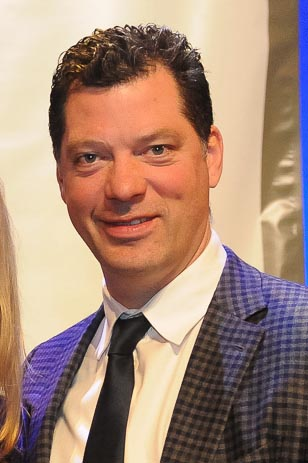
- Guerin in 2015
- Born: November 9, 1970 (age 55) Worcester, Massachusetts, U.S.
- Height: 6 ft 2 in (188 cm)
- Weight: 220 lb (100 kg; 15 st 10 lb)
- Position: Right wing
- Shot: Right
- Played for: New Jersey Devils; Edmonton Oilers; Boston Bruins; Dallas Stars; St. Louis Blues; San Jose Sharks; New York Islanders; Pittsburgh Penguins
- National team: United States
- NHL draft: 5th overall, 1989; New Jersey Devils
- Playing career: 1991–2010

William Robert Guerin (born November 9, 1970) is an American former professional ice hockey player, and the current general manager of the Minnesota Wild. He previously was the assistant general manager of the Pittsburgh Penguins and general manager of the Wilkes-Barre/Scranton Penguins.

Guerin played 18 seasons in the National Hockey League (NHL), winning two Stanley Cup championships with the New Jersey Devils and Pittsburgh Penguins.

Internationally, Guerin represented the United States at the Olympics in 1998, 2002 and 2006, and participated in two World Cup of Hockey tournaments. He was named general manager of Team USA for the 2025 Four Nations Face-Off and 2026 Winter Olympics. Guerin was the first player of Hispanic descent to play in the NHL.

== Playing career ==
=== Professional ===
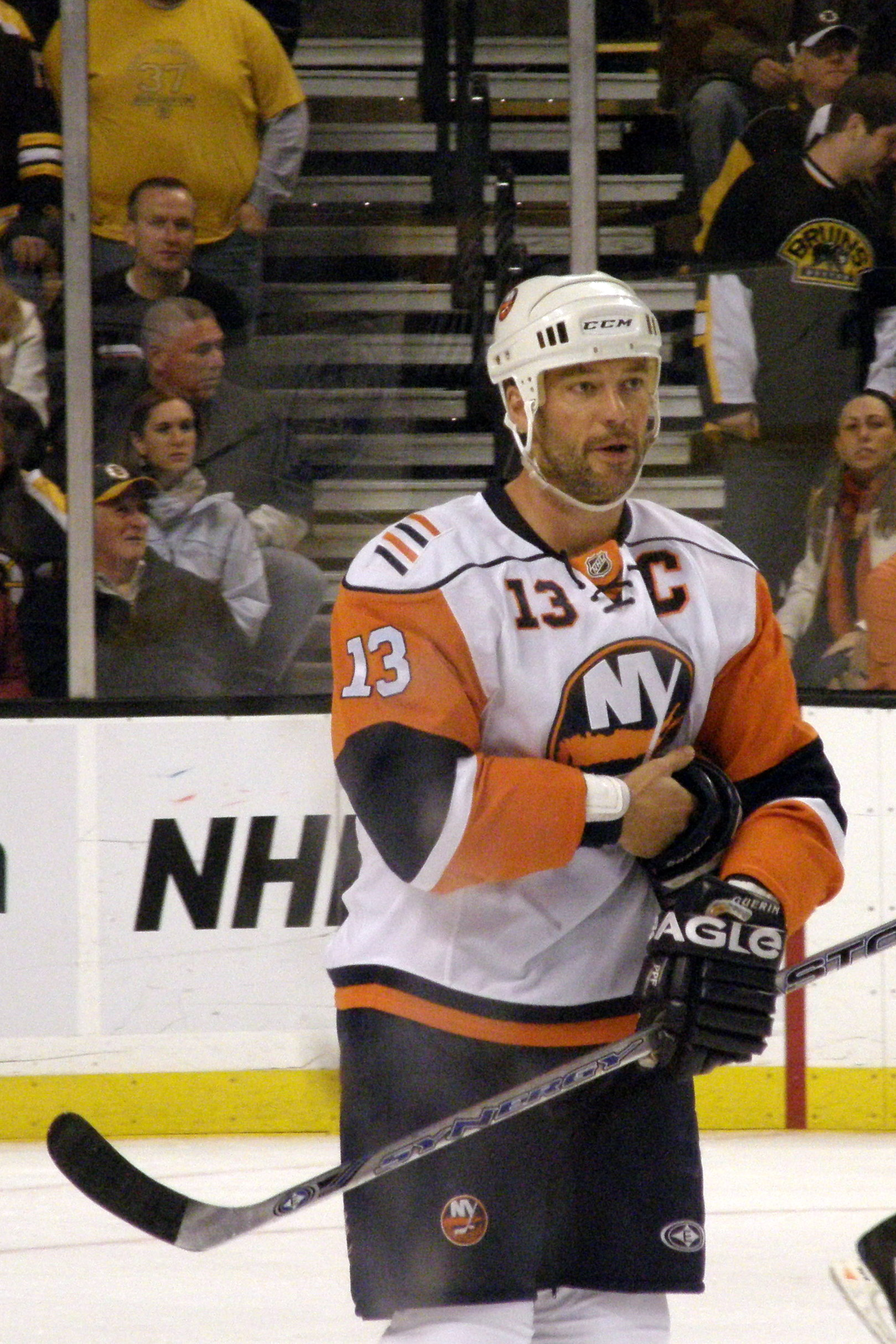
Guerin during his time as Islanders captain

Guerin was drafted in the 1989 NHL entry draft fifth overall by the New Jersey Devils and played with the team from 1991 to 1998, winning the Stanley Cup in 1995. Midway through the 1997–98 season, Guerin was traded (with Valeri Zelepukin) to the Edmonton Oilers for Jason Arnott and Bryan Muir.

In November 2001, Guerin was traded to his hometown team, the Boston Bruins.

After a 41-goal season in 2001–02, Guerin signed a five-year contract with the Dallas Stars. He performed below expectations with the Stars. Dallas bought out the remainder of his contract after a disappointing season in 2005–06 in which he recorded just 40 points. The Stars had to pay two-thirds of the remaining salary on his contract spread over twice as many years; this meant $6.7 million over one year became $4.4 million over two years.

On July 3, 2006, Guerin signed a one-year, $2 million contract with the St. Louis Blues. Playing on a line with former Oiler teammate Doug Weight, Guerin revived his career, easily eclipsing his disappointing goal-scoring mark from the 2005–06 season. He was named to the 2007 All-Star Game (hosted by the Stars) to represent the Blues. Despite numerous criticisms of his play during his time as a Star, Guerin received a standing ovation from the Dallas fans in recognition of his status as a longtime fan favorite.

On February 2, 2007, Guerin became the 214th NHL player to play in 1,000 games. Later that month, he was traded to the San Jose Sharks for Ville Nieminen, prospect Jay Barriball, and a conditional first-round pick (either New Jersey's in 2007 or San Jose's in 2008). During the subsequent offseason, Guerin signed a two-year contract with the New York Islanders. On July 9, 2007, he was named captain of the Islanders, making him the 11th captain in team history.

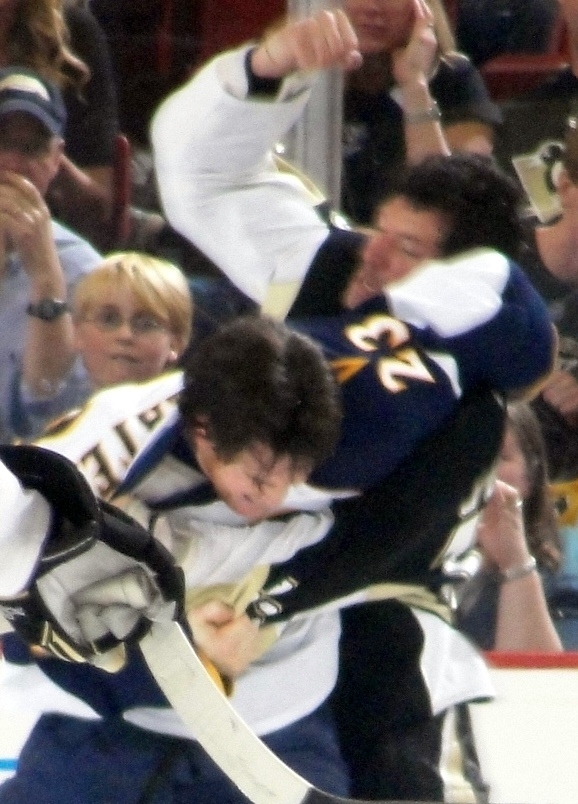
Guerin fights Jim Slater, April 2010

On March 4, 2009, Guerin was traded to the Pittsburgh Penguins for a conditional draft pick. The pick, a 2009 fourth-round pick if the Penguins made the playoffs, was later turned into a 2009 third-round pick once the Penguins advanced to the second round of the 2009 Stanley Cup playoffs. Guerin won the Stanley Cup on June 12, 2009, with the Penguins, defeating the Detroit Red Wings by a final score of 2–1 for game seven at Joe Louis Arena. His 14 years between Stanley Cups as a player was the third-longest wait in NHL history, behind Chris Chelios (16) and Mark Recchi (15).

After vocal encouragement for his return from the crowd and teammates at Pittsburgh's Stanley Cup parade on June 15, as well as expressing his affection for the city and team, Guerin signed a one-year contract extension with the Penguins on June 29 at a greatly reduced salary to play through the 2009–10 season. He became the first player to have a 20-goal season with seven different teams and one of only three to have a 20-goal season with five or more different teams (the two others being Eddie Shack and Ray Sheppard). Ray Shero, the general manager for the Penguins opted not to offer Guerin a contract for the 2010–11 season. On September 7, 2010, the Philadelphia Flyers invited Guerin to try out at training camp, but on October 4, the Flyers released him before the start of the regular season.

On December 6, 2010, Guerin announced his retirement as a player from the NHL as a Pittsburgh Penguin. At the time of his retirement, Guerin ranked seventh all-time among Americans in the NHL with 429 goals.

== Management career ==
On June 6, 2011, the Penguins hired Guerin as their player development coach. On June 6, 2014, Penguins general manager Jim Rutherford announced that Guerin would be promoted to assistant general manager of the team. Rutherford said that Guerin would be focusing on developing the analytical side of the game. Following consecutive Stanley Cup triumphs in 2016 and 2017, the Penguins announced that Guerin's duties would expand to include the role of general manager of their American Hockey League (AHL) affiliate, the Wilkes-Barre/Scranton Penguins, made vacant via the departure of Jason Botterill to the NHL's Buffalo Sabres.

On August 21, 2019, Guerin was named the fourth general manager of the Minnesota Wild. On March 21, 2022, Guerin was named the TSN TradeCentre GM of the Day, for his transactions at the 2022 NHL Trade Deadline.

== Controversies ==
=== Sexual assault coverup allegation ===
In a lawsuit filed on November 3, 2020, in Pennsylvania, it was alleged that Guerin played a role in covering up an alleged sexual assault on the wife of Wilkes-Barre/Scranton Penguins assistant coach Jarrod Skalde by the team's head coach Clark Donatelli. The lawsuit, Skalde et al. v. Lemieux Group, L.P. et al., alleges that Guerin, then the general manager of the Wilkes-Barre/Scranton Penguins, "told Skalde to keep quiet about the alleged assault." Guerin denied any wrongdoing on his part, claiming that he had "promptly brought (the allegation) to Pittsburgh Penguins senior management". The lawsuit was settled in November 2021. An internal investigation by the NHL confirmed that he had reported the incident promptly and cleared him of wrongdoing.

The United States Center for SafeSport opened an investigation on Guerin over his alleged role in the whistleblower lawsuit. As of April 2022, the organization had not yet released its findings, nor confirmed whether the investigation remained ongoing.

=== Verbal abuse investigation ===
In December 2023, the Wild investigated after an employee filed a verbal abuse complaint against Guerin to human resources. Guerin retained his position, no sanctions were announced, and the Wild refused to comment.

== Personal life ==
Guerin was born in Worcester, Massachusetts, and raised in Wilbraham, Massachusetts. He attended Wilbraham & Monson Academy, and played junior hockey for the Springfield Olympics instead of high school hockey. Guerin is of Nicaraguan descent through his mother and French Canadian, Irish, and Lithuanian descent through his father.

Guerin and his wife Kara have four children and reside in Eden Prairie, Minnesota. They previously lived in Moorestown, New Jersey during his tenure with the Devils.

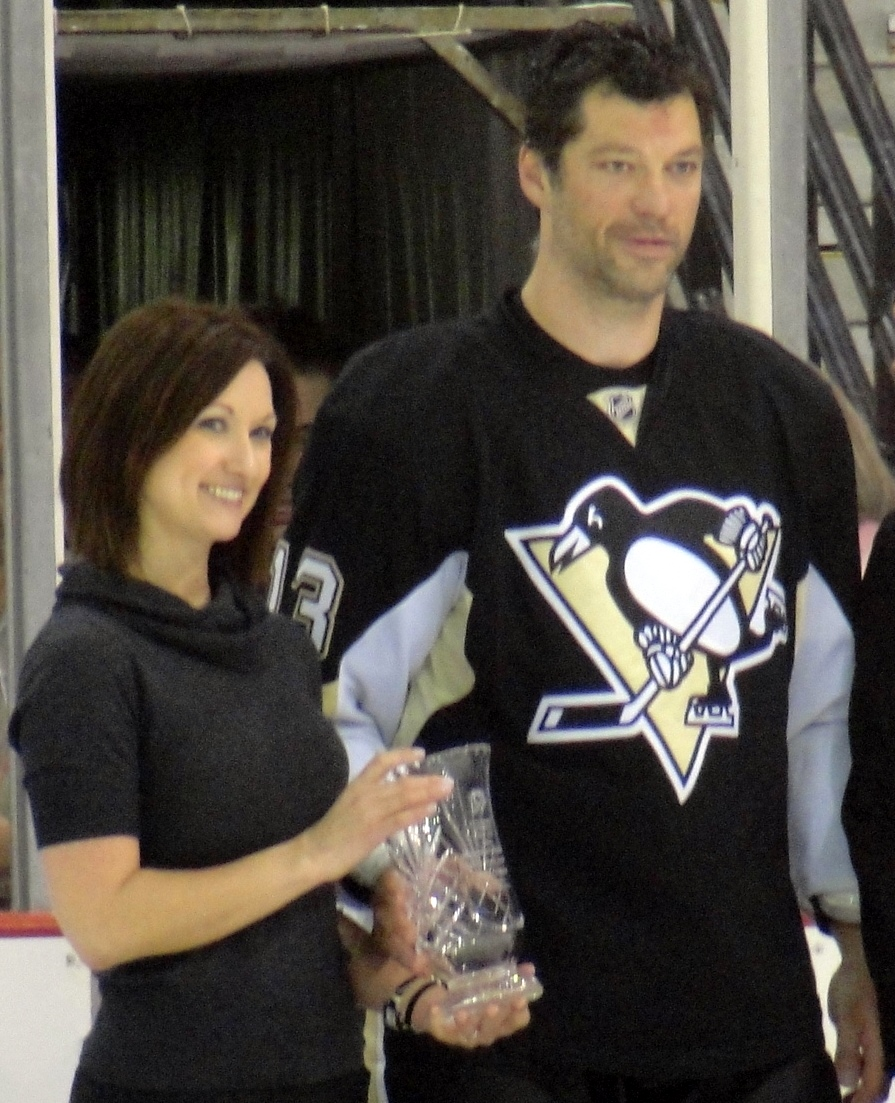
Guerin is honored as the Penguins nominee for the Masterton Trophy during a pregame ceremony in April 2010

Guerin is friends with Kash Patel.

== Awards and achievements ==
- NCAA (Hockey East) Champion 1990
- Member of four Stanley Cup-winning teams: New Jersey Devils (1995); Pittsburgh Penguins (2009 as a player, 2016 and 2017 as Assistant GM)
- Selected to four NHL All-Star Games: 2001, 2003, 2004, 2007
  - Named the MVP of the 2001 NHL All-Star Game
- NHL second team All-Star: 2002
- NHL Most Game Winning Goals (10): 2004
- United States Hockey Hall of Fame 2013

== Career statistics ==
=== Regular season and playoffs ===
			Regular season					Playoffs
Season	Team	League	GP	G	A	Pts	PIM	GP	G	A	Pts	PIM
1985–86	Springfield Olympics	NEJHL	48	26	19	45	71	—	—	—	—	—
1986–87	Springfield Olympics	NEJHL	32	34	20	54	40	—	—	—	—	—
1987–88	Springfield Olympics	NEJHL	38	31	44	75	146	—	—	—	—	—
1988–89	Springfield Olympics	NEJHL	31	32	35	67	90	—	—	—	—	—
1989–90	Boston College Eagles	HE	39	14	11	25	64	—	—	—	—	—
1990–91	Boston College Eagles	HE	38	26	19	45	102	—	—	—	—	—
1991–92	United States	Intl	46	12	15	27	67	—	—	—	—	—
1991–92	Utica Devils	AHL	22	13	10	23	6	4	1	3	4	14
1991–92	New Jersey Devils	NHL	5	0	1	1	9	6	3	0	3	4
1992–93	Utica Devils	AHL	18	10	7	17	47	—	—	—	—	—
1992–93	New Jersey Devils	NHL	65	14	20	34	63	5	1	1	2	4
1993–94	New Jersey Devils	NHL	81	25	19	44	101	17	2	1	3	35
1994–95	New Jersey Devils	NHL	48	12	13	25	72	20	3	8	11	30
1995–96	New Jersey Devils	NHL	80	23	30	53	116	—	—	—	—	—
1996–97	New Jersey Devils	NHL	82	29	18	47	95	8	2	1	3	18
1997–98	New Jersey Devils	NHL	19	5	5	10	13	—	—	—	—	—
1997–98	Edmonton Oilers	NHL	40	13	16	29	80	12	7	1	8	17
1998–99	Edmonton Oilers	NHL	80	30	34	64	133	3	0	2	2	2
1999–2000	Edmonton Oilers	NHL	70	24	22	46	123	5	3	2	5	9
2000–01	Edmonton Oilers	NHL	21	12	10	22	18	—	—	—	—	—
2000–01	Boston Bruins	NHL	64	28	35	63	122	—	—	—	—	—
2001–02	Boston Bruins	NHL	78	41	25	66	91	6	4	2	6	6
2002–03	Dallas Stars	NHL	64	25	25	50	113	4	0	0	0	4
2003–04	Dallas Stars	NHL	82	34	35	69	109	5	0	1	1	4
2005–06	Dallas Stars	NHL	70	13	27	40	115	5	3	1	4	0
2006–07	St. Louis Blues	NHL	61	28	19	47	52	—	—	—	—	—
2006–07	San Jose Sharks	NHL	16	8	1	9	14	9	0	2	2	12
2007–08	New York Islanders	NHL	81	23	21	44	65	—	—	—	—	—
2008–09	New York Islanders	NHL	61	16	20	36	63	—	—	—	—	—
2008–09	Pittsburgh Penguins	NHL	17	5	7	12	18	24	7	8	15	15
2009–10	Pittsburgh Penguins	NHL	78	21	24	45	75	11	4	5	9	2
NHL totals			1,263	429	427	856	1,660	133	39	34	73	152

=== International ===
Year	Team	Event	GP	G	A	Pts	PIM
1989	United States	WJC	7	0	3	3	16
1990	United States	WJC	7	0	0	0	18
1996	United States	WCH	7	0	2	2	17
1998	United States	OG	4	0	3	3	2
2002	United States	OG	6	4	0	4	4
2004	United States	WCH	5	2	2	4	8
2006	United States	OG	6	1	0	1	0
Junior totals			14	0	3	3	34
Senior totals			28	7	7	14	31

== Transactions ==
- June 17, 1989 – New Jersey Devils' first-round draft choice, fifth overall, in the 1989 NHL entry draft;
- January 4, 1998 – Traded by the New Jersey Devils, along with Valeri Zelepukin, to the Edmonton Oilers in exchange for Jason Arnott and Bryan Muir;
- November 15, 2000 – Traded by the Edmonton Oilers to the Boston Bruins in exchange for Anson Carter, Boston's 2001 first-round draft choice (Aleš Hemský) and Boston's 2001 second-round draft choice (Doug Lynch);
- July 3, 2002 – Signed as a free agent by the Dallas Stars;
- July 3, 2006 – Signed as a free agent by the St. Louis Blues;
- February 27, 2007 – Traded by the St. Louis Blues to the San Jose Sharks in exchange for Ville Nieminen, Jay Barriball and New Jersey's 2007 first-round draft choice (David Perron);
- July 5, 2007 – Signed as a free agent by the New York Islanders;
- March 4, 2009 – Traded by the New York Islanders to the Pittsburgh Penguins in exchange for Pittsburgh's 2009 third-round draft choice (pick traded to Phoenix).

== See also ==
- List of NHL players with 1,000 games played

Preceded by Corey Foster	New Jersey Devils first-round draft pick 1989	Succeeded by Jason Miller
Preceded by Alexei Yashin	New York Islanders captain 2007–09	Succeeded by Doug Weight
Preceded by Paul Fenton	General manager of the Minnesota Wild; 2019–present	Incumbent
