= Jonas Brodin =

Swedish ice hockey player (born 1993)

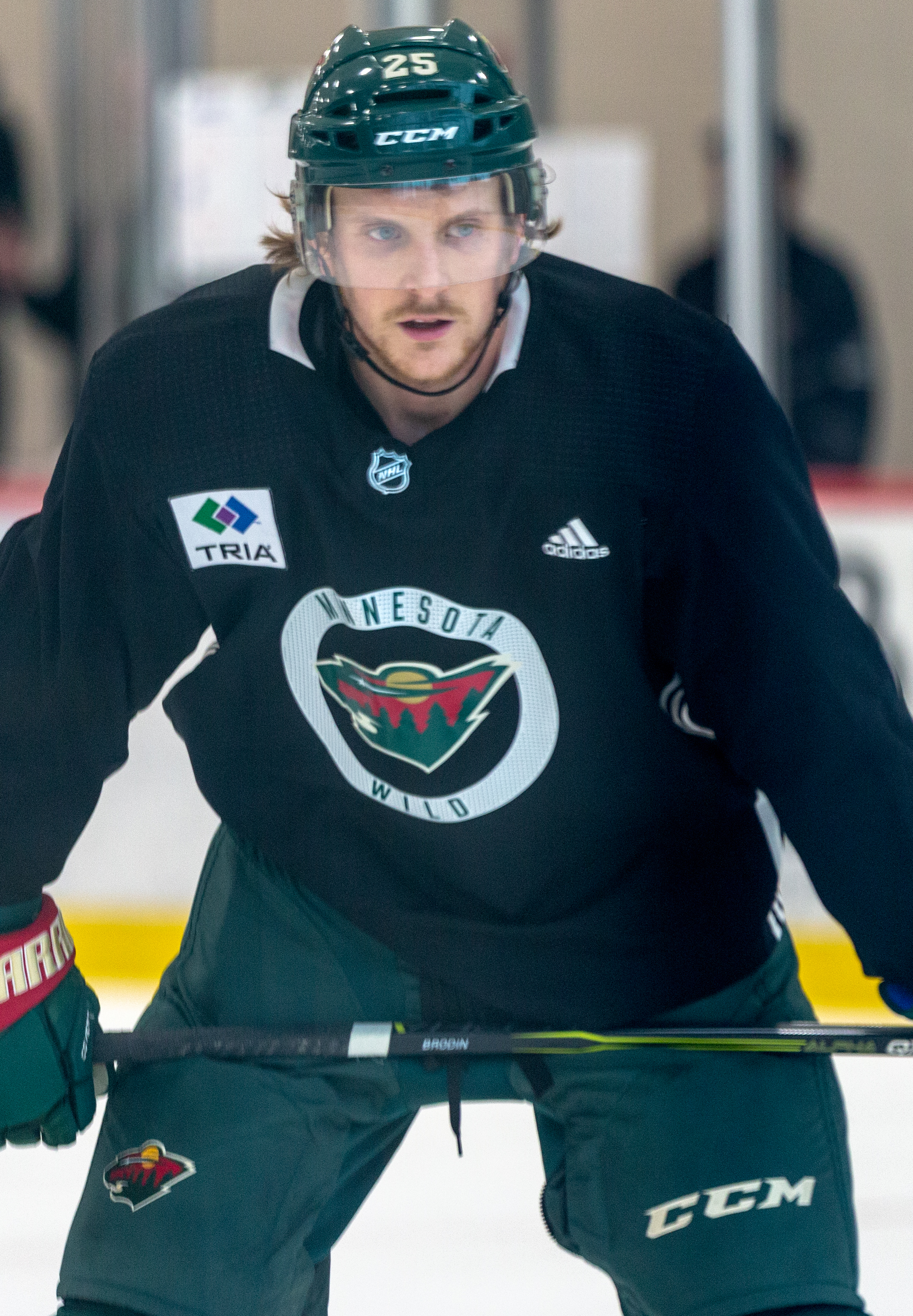
- Brodin with the Minnesota Wild in 2019
- Born: 12 July 1993 (age 33) Karlstad, Sweden
- Height: 6 ft 2 in (188 cm)
- Weight: 196 lb (89 kg; 14 st 0 lb)
- Position: Defence
- Shoots: Left
- NHL team Former teams: Minnesota Wild; Färjestad BK
- National team: Sweden
- NHL draft: 10th overall, 2011; Minnesota Wild
- Playing career: 2009–present

Jonas Brodin (born 12 July 1993) is a Swedish professional ice hockey player who is a defenceman for the Minnesota Wild of the National Hockey League (NHL). After recording four assists through 42 games as a 17-year-old in the Swedish Hockey League, Brodin was drafted in the first round, 10th overall, by the Wild in the 2011 NHL entry draft.

== Early life ==
Brodin was born on 12 July 1993, in Karlstad, Sweden, to Stefan and Kristina and grew up alongside siblings Alexandra and Christoffer. Growing up, he preferred soccer over hockey and quit the sport when he was around nine years old. He picked ice hockey back up again at the age of 14 after being forced to choose between them. His brother Christoffer played ice hockey for Nor IK before retiring in 2012 while his cousins Hannes and Jesper Ewen continue to play the sport professionally.

== Playing career ==
=== Färjestad BK ===
Due to his birthday, Brodin played the entirety of the 2010–11 Swedish Hockey League (SHL) season as a 17-year-old. As a teenager, he accumulated four assists and 12 penalty minutes through 42 games. Prior to the 2011 NHL entry draft, Brodin was ranked third amongst eligible European skaters by the NHL Central Scouting Bureau. Scout Grant Sonier praised Brodin, saying: "He's an exceptional puck retrieval and transitional defenceman...He has the ability to process pressure and make an excellent first pass. This player was considered to be a top pick in my mind the last few years." After finishing his second season with the Färjestad BK, Brodin was selected 10th overall by the Minnesota Wild in the 2011 NHL entry draft. On 12 July 2011, the Wild signed him to a three-year, entry-level contract but was returned to Sweden for another season to further his development before making the jump to the NHL.

In his third season with Färjestad BK, Brodin improved with eight assists over 49 regular season games and two goals over 11 playoff games.

=== Minnesota Wild ===
Due to the NHL lockout, Brodin and fellow prospects Charlie Coyle, and Mikael Granlund joined the Wild's American Hockey League (AHL) affiliate, the Houston Aeros for the 2012–13 season. He recorded four points over his first eight AHL games before suffering a broken clavicle as a result of a hit by Taylor Hall during a game on 2 November. Although Hall was originally given a match penalty and automatically suspended, it was rescinded the following day after it was determined the hit was legal. Brodin underwent surgery to repair the clavicle that month and missed over a month and a half to recover. He played one game with the Aeros upon recovering before being recalled to the NHL level on 24 January 2013. He subsequently made his NHL debut the following night and recorded his first career NHL point, an assist, in a 5–3 loss to the Detroit Red Wings. Throughout his rookie season, Brodin was often paired alongside veteran Ryan Suter and played more minutes per game than any other rookie in the league. On 14 March, Brodin scored his first NHL goal in a 5–3 win over the Colorado Avalanche. Brodin finished his rookie season with two goals and nine assists for 11 points through 45 regular-season games while leading all rookies in average time on ice. As the youngest defenceman to play in the NHL during the 2012–13 season, he also became the eighth first-year skater in League history to average more than 23 minutes per game. Brodin remained with Suter during the Wild's 2013 Stanley Cup playoffs first round series against the Chicago Blackhawks, playing 34 minutes in his Game 1 debut. Although Brodin was named to the NHL All-Rookie Team, he was not considered a top-three finalist for the Calder Memorial Trophy as the NHL's Rookie of the Year. Wild General Manager Chuck Fletcher publicly criticized the Professional Hockey Writers Association for not nominating Brodin as a Calder Trophy finalist.

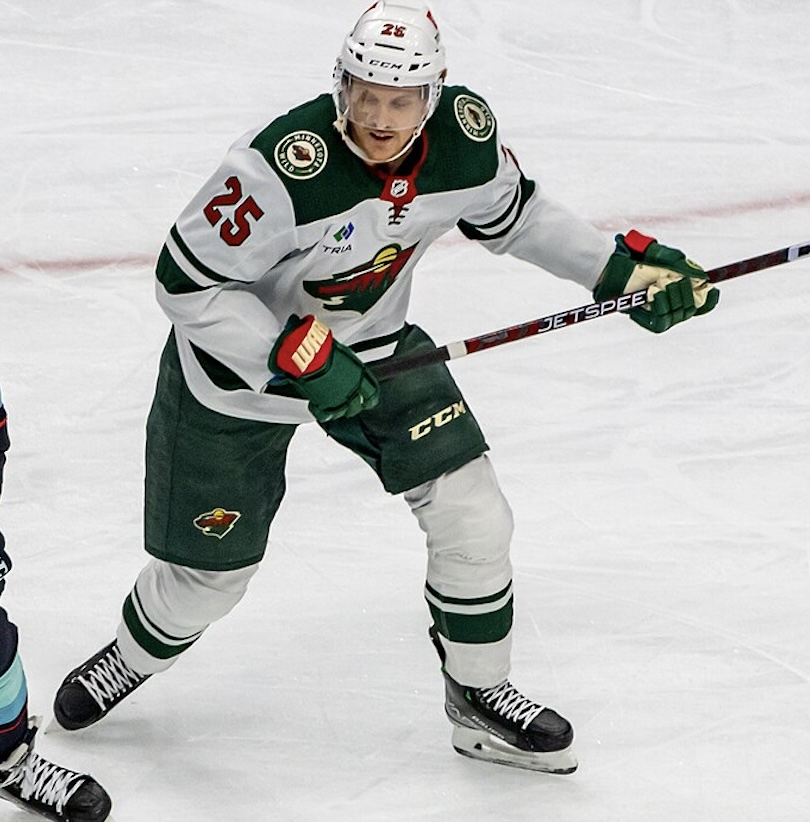
Brodin during a game against the Seattle Kraken in November 2022.

In his sophomore season, Brodin's defensive play earned him praise from assistant coach Scott Stevens, who said: "He doesn't have a gap. He doesn't back up at all, and that's the way the good ones are." Brodin made an immediate impact with the Wild at the start of the 2013–14 season by scoring two goals and three assists in his first seven games. Over those seven games, he ranked second amongst all Wild defencemen with an average of 25:16 minutes of ice time per game in all situations. He added one goal over the next three games before suffering a broken cheekbone near the end of October. Brodin missed 10 days to recover before returning to the Wild's lineup on 1 November. He finished the 2013–14 season with eight goals and 11 assists.

Brodin tallied one assist in his first two games with the Wild to start the 2014–15 season before signing a six-year, $25 million contract extension on 12 October 2014. During the month of November, Brodin and over a dozen of other players were affected by a League-wide mumps outbreak. As a result, Brodin missed seven games between 13 November and 26 November to recover. In March 2015, Brodin was described by journalist Michael Russo as one of the NHL's "most mobile, best puck-handling defenceman." At the conclusion of the season, Brodin placed 13th out of 20 in Lady Byng Trophy voting as the NHL's most gentlemanly player and was tied for 18th in Norris Trophy voting.

Brodin started the 2015–16 season with Matt Dumba but the pair only lasted three games together. During a game against the New York Rangers on 4 February 2016, Brodin suffered a lower body injury after blocking a shot with his foot. He subsequently missed 12 games to recover from the broken foot before returning to the Wild's lineup on 29 February. He finished the 2015–16 season with two goals and seven points through 68 games.

During the 2016–17 season, Brodin was paired with Christian Folin for the first half of the season. He began the season strong, improving on his previous season's total by tallying 10 points in 21 games, before losing Folin as a partner due to injury. Once Folin recovered, the two reconnected as defensive partners before Brodin suffered a finger injury in January 2017. At the time of the injury, Brodin had already surpassed his point total from the previous season, ranked second on the team in blocked shots, and third on the team in average ice time.

Brodin had a career-high 28 points during the 2019–20 season. On 15 September 2020, the Wild signed Brodin to a seven-year, $42 million contract extension.

Following a hit by Edmonton Oilers forward Evander Kane during a game on 8 December 2023, Brodin missed 17 games to recover from a broken thumb. He rejoined the team on 15 January where he played 20 minutes of ice time and assisted on Marcus Foligno's third period goal against the New York Islanders to help secure a 5–0 win.

== International play ==
Brodin represented Sweden at the 2024 World Championship and won a bronze medal.

== Career statistics ==
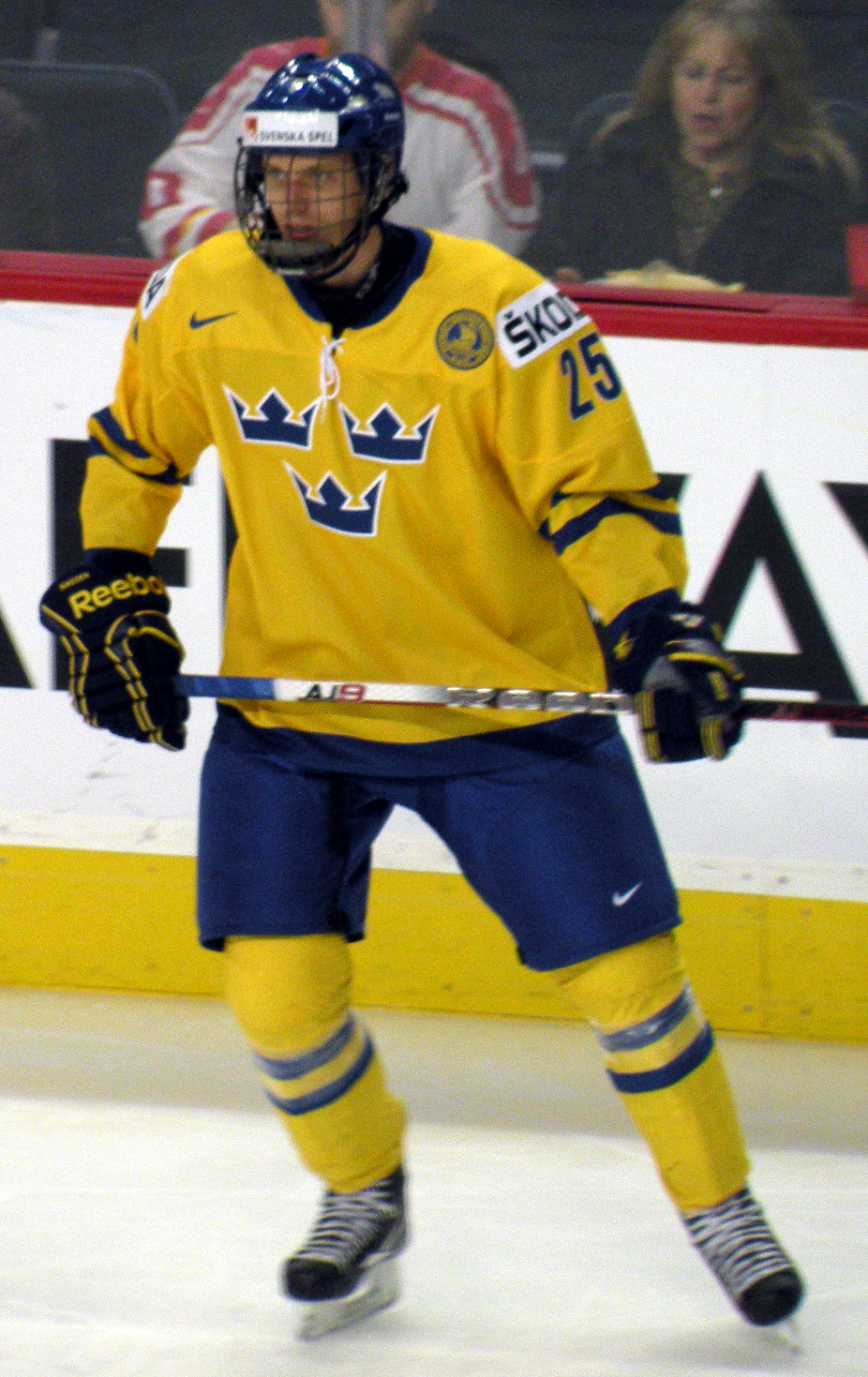
- Brodin during the 2012 World Junior Championships

Medal record

Men's ice hockey

Representing Sweden

World Championships
Gold medal – first place	2017 Germany/France	
Bronze medal – third place	2024 Czech Republic	
Bronze medal – third place	2025 Sweden/Denmark	

World Junior Championships
Gold medal – first place	2012 Calgary	

IIHF World U18 Championship
Silver medal – second place	2011 Dresden	
Silver medal – second place	2010 Minsk	

=== Regular season and playoffs ===
			Regular season					Playoffs
Season	Team	League	GP	G	A	Pts	PIM	GP	G	A	Pts	PIM
2008–09	Färjestad BK	J18	9	2	1	3	8	—	—	—	—	—
2008–09	Färjestad BK	J18 Allsv	13	1	7	8	2	—	—	—	—	—
2009–10	Färjestad BK	J18	13	5	7	12	4	—	—	—	—	—
2009–10	Färjestad BK	J18 Allsv	6	1	4	5	2	7	3	8	11	8
2009–10	Färjestad BK	SEL	3	0	0	0	2	—	—	—	—	—
2009–10	Skåre BK	J20 Elit	2	0	1	1	2	—	—	—	—	—
2009–10	Skåre BK	SWE.3	21	1	6	7	10	—	—	—	—	—
2010–11	Färjestad BK	J18	2	0	1	1	2	—	—	—	—	—
2010–11	Färjestad BK	SEL	42	0	4	4	12	14	2	0	2	2
2011–12	Färjestad BK	J20	1	0	0	0	0	—	—	—	—	—
2011–12	Färjestad BK	SEL	49	0	8	8	14	11	2	0	2	6
2012–13	Houston Aeros	AHL	9	2	2	4	4	—	—	—	—	—
2012–13	Minnesota Wild	NHL	45	2	9	11	10	5	0	0	0	0
2013–14	Minnesota Wild	NHL	79	8	11	19	22	13	0	2	2	12
2014–15	Minnesota Wild	NHL	71	3	14	17	8	10	0	0	0	0
2015–16	Minnesota Wild	NHL	68	2	5	7	20	6	1	2	3	0
2016–17	Minnesota Wild	NHL	68	3	22	25	20	5	0	1	1	0
2017–18	Minnesota Wild	NHL	73	6	15	21	30	5	0	2	2	2
2018–19	Minnesota Wild	NHL	82	4	14	18	30	—	—	—	—	—
2019–20	Minnesota Wild	NHL	69	2	26	28	24	4	0	2	2	0
2020–21	Minnesota Wild	NHL	53	9	14	23	18	7	0	3	3	2
2021–22	Minnesota Wild	NHL	73	5	25	30	18	6	1	2	3	2
2022–23	Minnesota Wild	NHL	60	3	11	14	30	6	0	0	0	0
2023–24	Minnesota Wild	NHL	62	7	20	27	16	—	—	—	—	—
2024–25	Minnesota Wild	NHL	50	4	16	20	18	6	0	1	1	0
2025–26	Minnesota Wild	NHL	62	4	14	18	16	5	0	1	1	4
SEL totals			94	0	12	12	28	25	4	0	4	8
NHL totals			915	62	216	278	280	78	2	16	18	22

=== International ===
Year	Team	Event	Result	GP	G	A	Pts	PIM
2010	Sweden	U17	3rd place, bronze medalist(s)	6	1	1	2	12
2010	Sweden	U18	2nd place, silver medalist(s)	6	0	2	2	0
2011	Sweden	U18	2nd place, silver medalist(s)	4	0	1	1	2
2012	Sweden	WJC	1st place, gold medalist(s)	6	0	4	4	14
2012	Sweden	WC	6th	7	1	0	1	0
2017	Sweden	WC	1st place, gold medalist(s)	10	1	2	3	6
2024	Sweden	WC	3rd place, bronze medalist(s)	10	1	3	4	0
2025	Sweden	4NF	3rd	3	1	0	1	0
2025	Sweden	WC	3rd place, bronze medalist(s)	10	3	4	7	2
Junior totals				22	1	8	9	28
Senior totals				40	7	9	16	8

== Awards and honours ==
Award	Year	Ref
NHL
NHL All-Rookie Team	2013	

Awards and achievements
Preceded by Mikael Granlund	Minnesota Wild first-round draft pick 2011	Succeeded by Zack Phillips
