= Doug Risebrough =

Canadian ice hockey player (born 1954)

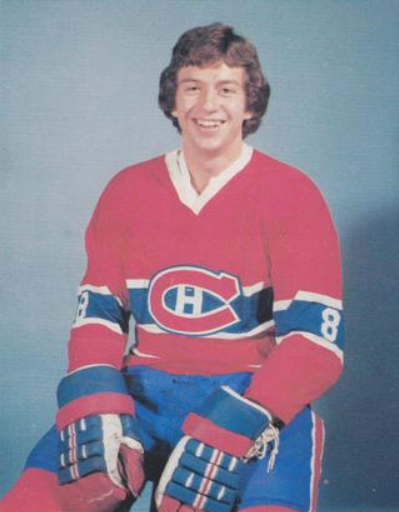
- Risebrough in 1976 card
- Born: January 29, 1954 (age 72) Guelph, Ontario, Canada
- Height: 5 ft 11 in (180 cm)
- Weight: 183 lb (83 kg; 13 st 1 lb)
- Position: Centre
- Shot: Left
- Played for: Montreal Canadiens; Calgary Flames
- NHL draft: 7th overall, 1974; Montreal Canadiens
- WHA draft: 10th overall, 1974; Cleveland Crusaders
- Playing career: 1974–1987

Douglas John Risebrough (born January 29, 1954) is a Canadian former player, coach, and general manager in the National Hockey League (NHL). In his 31 years in the NHL, he has been involved with the Stanley Cup Playoffs 25 times. He is currently a pro scout for the New York Rangers.

== Playing history ==
Risebrough was born in Guelph, Ontario, and was the Montreal Canadiens’ first pick (7th overall) in the 1974 NHL amateur draft. In eight seasons with the Canadiens, Risebrough helped Montreal capture four consecutive Stanley Cup titles (1976 through 1979). He was traded to the Calgary Flames on September 11, 1982, and spent the next five years with the Flames. During his tenure with Calgary, Risebrough skated as the Flames co-captain then tri-captain for four seasons, with both Lanny McDonald and Jim Peplinski. In 1986, as a Tri-Captain, Doug Risebrough led the Flames to his fifth Stanley Cup Final as a player. They eventually lost to his former team, the Canadiens, in five games. Throughout his career, Risebrough was an agitator, often assigned to pester the opponents' top players. In one famous chapter of the Battle of Alberta, Risebrough, while playing with the Flames fought with Marty McSorley. Risebrough lost the fight, but ended up with McSorley's jersey, which he shredded with his skates.

In 740 career NHL games, Risebrough totaled 185 goals and 471 points. He added 21 goals and 37 assists in 124 Stanley Cup playoff contests. He also held a total of 1542 penalty minutes during the regular season, and an additional 238 in the playoffs. During his 13-year career, teams on which Risebrough played recorded a .660 regular season winning percentage (607–274–159).

== Coaching and management history ==
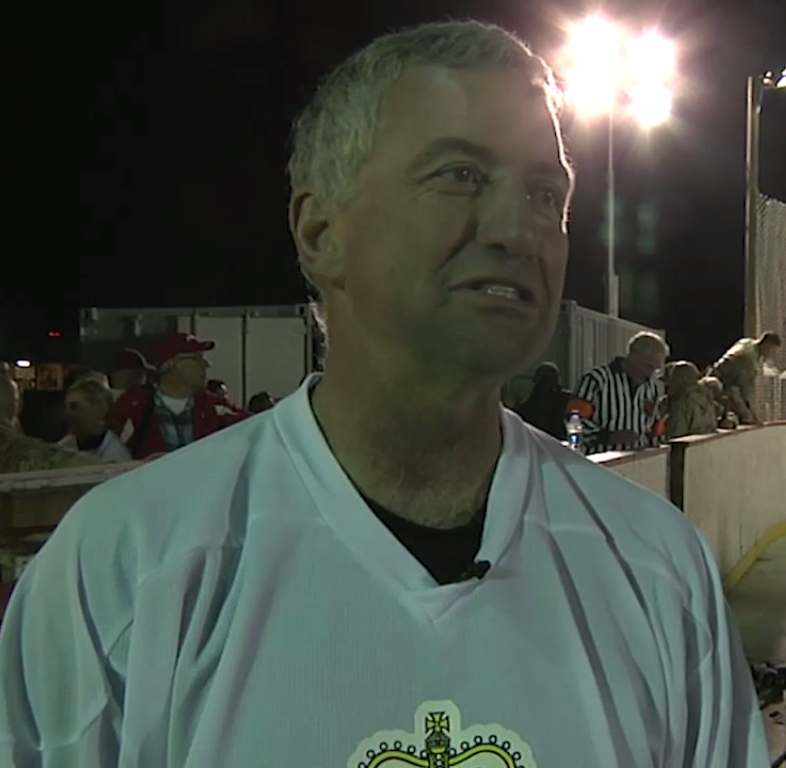
Risebrough in 2011

After announcing his retirement as a player following the 1986–87 season, Risebrough served two seasons as an assistant coach with the Flames. He helped guide Calgary to two consecutive Presidents' Trophies and the 1989 Stanley Cup championship, his fifth Stanley Cup championship as a player or coach. He was promoted to assistant general manager for the Flames before the 1989–90 season, and served as Calgary’s head coach for the 1990–91 campaign. On May 16, 1991, Risebrough became only the second general manager in Flames’ history, and served as both general manager and coach for the first 64 games of the 1991–92 season. On March 1, 1992, Risebrough's Flames were beaten by the Vancouver Canucks 11–0 and immediately after the game, Risebrough relinquished his coaching duties to assistant Guy Charron. He did, however, continue his role as Calgary's general manager until his firing on November 2, 1995.

Prior to joining the Minnesota Wild, Risebrough served as the Edmonton Oilers vice president of hockey operations from 1996 to 1999. With the Oilers he was involved in all aspects of the club's hockey operations department. Edmonton advanced to the Stanley Cup playoffs in each of the three seasons Risebrough was with the organization. The turnaround followed four consecutive years in which the Oilers did not make the playoffs.

Risebrough was named executive vice president and general manager of the Minnesota Wild on September 2, 1999. After the Wild's first playoff appearance in 2002–03, he was promoted to president of Minnesota Sports and Entertainment, the corporate parent of the Wild, on July 23, 2003. On April 16, 2009, Risebrough was relieved of his duties with the Minnesota Wild.

== Career statistics ==
			Regular season					Playoffs
Season	Team	League	GP	G	A	Pts	PIM	GP	G	A	Pts	PIM
1971–72	Guelph CMCs	SOJHL	56	19	33	52	127	—	—	—	—	—
1972–73	Guelph Biltmore Mad Hatters	SOJHL	60	47	60	107	229	—	—	—	—	—
1973–74	Kitchener Rangers	OHA-Jr.	46	25	27	52	114	—	—	—	—	—
1974–75	Montreal Canadiens	NHL	64	15	32	47	198	11	3	5	8	37
1974–75	Nova Scotia Voyageurs	AHL	7	5	4	9	55	—	—	—	—	—
1975–76	Montreal Canadiens	NHL	80	16	28	44	180	13	0	3	3	30
1976–77	Montreal Canadiens	NHL	78	22	38	60	132	12	2	3	5	16
1977–78	Montreal Canadiens	NHL	72	18	23	41	97	15	2	2	4	17
1978–79	Montreal Canadiens	NHL	48	10	15	25	62	15	1	6	7	32
1979–80	Montreal Canadiens	NHL	44	8	10	18	81	—	—	—	—	—
1980–81	Montreal Canadiens	NHL	48	13	21	34	93	3	1	0	1	0
1981–82	Montreal Canadiens	NHL	59	15	18	33	116	5	2	1	3	11
1982–83	Calgary Flames	NHL	71	21	37	58	138	9	1	3	4	18
1983–84	Calgary Flames	NHL	77	23	28	51	161	11	2	1	3	25
1984–85	Calgary Flames	NHL	15	7	5	12	49	4	0	3	3	12
1985–86	Calgary Flames	NHL	62	15	28	43	169	22	7	9	16	38
1986–87	Calgary Flames	NHL	22	2	3	5	66	4	0	1	1	2
NHL totals			740	185	286	471	1,542	124	21	37	58	238

== Coaching record ==
Team	Year	Regular season						Postseason
Team	Year	G	W	L	T	Pts	Division rank	Result
CGY	1990–91	80	46	26	8	100	2nd in Smythe	Lost in first round
CGY	1991–92	64	25	30	9	(74)	5th in Smythe	(resigned)
Total		144	71	56	17			

== Personal life ==
Risebrough and his wife Marilyn have two daughters, Allison and Lindsay, who was a star tennis player at Edina High School and the University of Minnesota.

Preceded by Cam Connor	Montreal Canadiens first-round draft pick 1974	Succeeded by Rick Chartraw
Preceded by Phil Russell	Calgary Flames captain 1983–87 with Lanny McDonald (1983–87) and Jim Peplinski (1984–87)	Succeeded by Lanny McDonald; Jim Peplinski
Preceded by Terry Crisp	Head coach of the Calgary Flames; 1990–92	Succeeded by Guy Charron
Preceded by Cliff Fletcher	General Manager of the Calgary Flames; 1991–95	Succeeded by Al Coates
Preceded by Position created	General Manager of the Minnesota Wild; 1999–2009	Succeeded by Chuck Fletcher
