= List of Minnesota Wild general managers =

The Minnesota Wild is an American professional ice hockey team based in Saint Paul, Minnesota. It plays in the Central Division of the Western Conference in the National Hockey League (NHL). The Wild joined the NHL in 2000 as an expansion team with the Columbus Blue Jackets. The Wild have played their home games at the Grand Casino Arena since its first season. The team has had four general managers since their inception.

== Key ==
Key of terms and definitions
Term	Definition
No.	Number of general managers^{[a]}
Ref(s)	References
–	Does not apply

== General managers ==
General managers of the Minnesota Wild
No.	Name	Tenure	Accomplishments during this term	Ref(s)
1	Doug Risebrough	September 2, 1999 – April 16, 2009	1 division title and 3 playoff appearances	
2	Chuck Fletcher	May 22, 2009 – April 23, 2018	6 playoff appearances	
3	Paul Fenton	May 21, 2018 – July 30, 2019	No playoff appearances	
4	Bill Guerin	August 21, 2019 – present	5 playoff appearances	

== See also ==
- List of NHL general managers

== Notes ==
- ^{a} A running total of the number of general managers of the franchise. Thus any general manager who has two or more separate terms as general manager is only counted once.
