= Paul Fenton (ice hockey) =

American ice hockey player (born 1959)

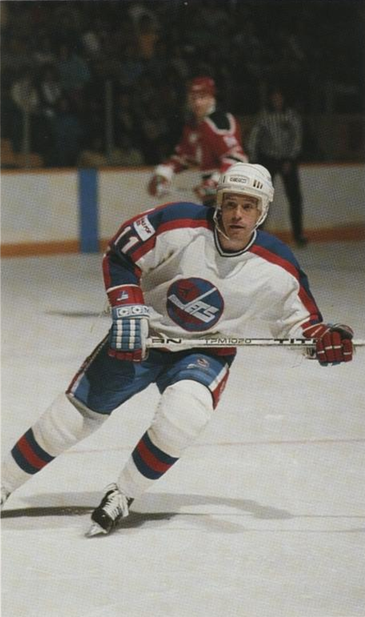
- Fenton in 1988 photo
- Born: December 22, 1959 (age 66) Springfield, Massachusetts, U.S.
- Height: 5 ft 11 in (180 cm)
- Weight: 180 lb (82 kg; 12 st 12 lb)
- Position: Left wing
- Shot: Left
- Played for: Hartford Whalers; New York Rangers; Los Angeles Kings; Winnipeg Jets; Toronto Maple Leafs; Calgary Flames; San Jose Sharks
- National team: United States
- NHL draft: Undrafted
- Playing career: 1984–1992

Paul John Fenton Jr. (born December 22, 1959) is an American former ice hockey forward and current executive for the Florida Panthers. He has previously served as the general manager for the Minnesota Wild. Before joining the Wild, he had worked as assistant general manager with the Nashville Predators.

== Playing career ==
Fenton played amateur hockey with Vermont Academy, but started his National Hockey League career with the Hartford Whalers in 1985. He also played for the New York Rangers, Los Angeles Kings, Winnipeg Jets, Toronto Maple Leafs, Calgary Flames, and San Jose Sharks. He retired from the NHL after the 1992 season.

In 1983, while playing for the Peoria Prancers, Fenton won the Ken McKenzie Trophy, awarded to the most outstanding American-born rookie playing in the International Hockey League.

== Executive career ==
Before being named general manager and chief of the Minnesota Wild on May 21, 2018, Fenton was an assistant general manager with the NHL's Nashville Predators, while simultaneously serving as the general manager of the AHL's Milwaukee Admirals.

After just one season, Fenton was relieved of his duties as General Manager of the Minnesota Wild on July 30, 2019. The following year, he was hired by the Florida Panthers as a Senior Adviser to the General Manager. Fenton won a Stanley Cup with the Panthers in 2024.

== Personal life ==
Fenton is the son of Paul Fenton Sr. and Joann Mullin, his father was the Police Chief of the city of Springfield, Massachusetts for 14 years and worked for the police for over 40 years. Fenton has two sons, one of whom, P. J. Fenton, played hockey for the AHL's Rochester Americans and is currently a part of the Minnesota Wild's amateur scouting team. His other son Owen is an assistant professor in the Department of Chemical and Biomolecular Engineering at National University of Singapore (NUS).

== Career statistics ==
=== Regular season and playoffs ===
			Regular season					Playoffs
Season	Team	League	GP	G	A	Pts	PIM	GP	G	A	Pts	PIM
1979–80	Boston University	ECAC	24	8	17	25	14	—	—	—	—	—
1980–81	Boston University	ECAC	5	3	2	5	0	—	—	—	—	—
1981–82	Boston University	ECAC	28	20	13	33	20	—	—	—	—	—
1982–83	Peoria Prancers	IHL	82	60	51	111	53	—	—	—	—	—
1982–83	Colorado Flames	CHL	1	0	1	1	0	3	2	0	2	2
1983–84	Binghamton Whalers	AHL	78	41	24	65	67	—	—	—	—	—
1984–85	Hartford Whalers	NHL	33	7	5	12	10	—	—	—	—	—
1984–85	Binghamton Whalers	AHL	45	26	21	47	18	—	—	—	—	—
1985–86	Hartford Whalers	NHL	1	0	0	0	0	—	—	—	—	—
1985–86	Binghamton Whalers	AHL	75	53	35	88	87	6	2	0	2	2
1986–87	New York Rangers	NHL	8	0	0	0	2	—	—	—	—	—
1986–87	New Haven Nighthawks	AHL	70	37	38	75	45	7	6	4	10	6
1987–88	Los Angeles Kings	NHL	71	20	23	43	46	5	2	1	3	2
1987–88	New Haven Nighthawks	AHL	5	11	5	16	9	—	—	—	—	—
1988–89	Los Angeles Kings	NHL	21	2	3	5	6	—	—	—	—	—
1988–89	Winnipeg Jets	NHL	59	14	9	23	33	—	—	—	—	—
1989–90	Winnipeg Jets	NHL	80	32	18	50	40	7	2	0	2	23
1990–91	Winnipeg Jets	NHL	17	4	4	8	18	—	—	—	—	—
1990–91	Toronto Maple Leafs	NHL	30	5	10	15	0	—	—	—	—	—
1990–91	Calgary Flames	NHL	31	5	7	12	10	5	0	0	0	2
1991–92	San Jose Sharks	NHL	60	11	4	15	33	—	—	—	—	—
AHL totals			273	168	123	291	226	13	8	4	12	8
NHL totals			411	100	83	183	198	17	4	1	5	27

=== International ===
Year	Team	Event	GP	G	A	Pts	PIM
1985	United States	WC	9	2	1	3	8
1989	United States	WC	10	1	3	4	14
Senior totals			19	3	4	7	22

== See also ==
- American ice hockey players

Sporting positions
Preceded by Chuck Fletcher	General Manager of the Minnesota Wild; 2018–2019	Succeeded by Bill Guerin
