= Chuck Fletcher =

Canadian ice hockey manager

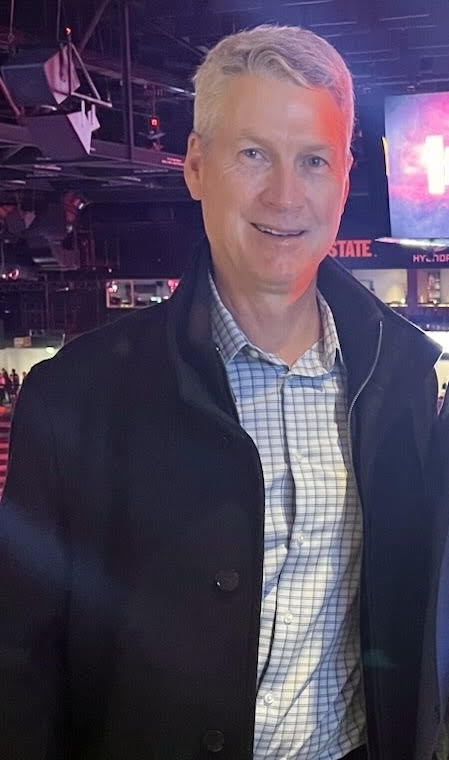
- Born: April 29, 1967 (age 59); Montreal, Quebec, Canada
- Occupation: NHL Executive

George Charles Fletcher (born April 29, 1967), professionally known as Chuck Fletcher, is a Canadian professional ice hockey executive with over three decades of experience in NHL front offices. He is currently serving as the Senior Advisor to the Seattle Kraken.

Fletcher is one of 30 NHL General Managers to lead their team(s) for 1,000 regular season games since the 1967 expansion. He is one of 38 NHL General Managers to record over 500 wins.

He is part of the only father-son combo to rank in the top 40 for most career wins as NHL General Managers (Cliff Fletcher ranked sixth, Chuck Fletcher ranked 37th). His teams have appeared in four Stanley Cup Finals, (Florida Panthers 1996, Anaheim Ducks 2003, Pittsburgh Penguins 2008 and 2009), winning the Stanley Cup in 2009.

== Career ==
=== Early career ===
Fletcher graduated from Harvard College in 1990. Prior to his executive roles he spent a year working as the sales and merchandising coordinator for Hockey Canada (1987-1988) and two years as a player representative for Newport Sports Management (1991-1993).

=== Florida Panthers ===
Fletcher joined the Florida Panthers for their expansion year in 1993, serving the club through 2002. In addition, Fletcher served as the General Manager for the Panthers' AHL farm teams in Cincinnati, Louisville, and Greensboro.

Inaugural General Manager and Hall of Fame member Bobby Clarke hired 25 year-old Fletcher. Clarke left the franchise after one season and his predecessor, Bryan Murray, retained Fletcher. Fletcher retained his position on Murray's staff and the Panthers went on to play in the 1996 Stanley Cup Final in just their third season, a record for the fastest of any expansion franchise in the NHL, NFL, NBA, or MLB until the Vegas Golden Knights reached the Final in their first season (2018). The Panthers also set a record for most wins by an expansion team in their first postseason appearance with 12 victories (also later to be broken by the Vegas Golden Knights during their inaugural season).

Fletcher remained in his role throughout Murray's tenure, as well as when Murray was replaced by Club President Bill Torrey. Upon Torrey's retirement, Fletcher served as Interim General Manager from December 3rd, 2001 through May 10th, 2002. At the time he was named interim General Manager, the 34 year-old Fletcher was one of the ten youngest men to hold the role of General Manager for an NHL team since 1967.

==== GM record ====
Fletcher served the Panthers' General Manager for 56 games, compiling a record of 16-29-8-3 (0.384 point percentage).

=== Anaheim Ducks ===
Fletcher served as the Director of Hockey Operations, Assistant General Manager, and Vice President of Amateur Scouting/Player Development for the Anaheim Ducks from 2002-2006 helping build a talent pool notable future NHL-players, including Ryan Getzlaf, Corey Perry, Chris Kunitz, Joffrey Lupul, and Dustin Penner. Fletcher also served as the General Manager for the Ducks AHL team in Cincinnati. The Anaheim Ducks reached the Stanley Cup Finals in 2003

=== Pittsburgh Penguins ===
Fletcher served three years as the Assistant General Manager for the Pittsburgh Penguins (2006-2009) serving General Manager Ray Shero, reaching the Stanley Cups Final in 2008 and winning the Stanley Cup in 2009. As AGM Fletcher also ran the AHL Wilkes-Barre/Scranton Penguins team with a roster that included future NHL players Alex Goligoski, Tyler Kennedy, and Deryk Engelland. In each of the three seasons Fletcher ran the WBS Penguins, they recorded at least 100 points in the regular season. In 2008, Fletcher's AHL Penguins reached the Calder Cup Final.

=== Minnesota Wild ===
Fletcher was hired as General Manager and Executive Vice President of the Minnesota Wild, on May 21, 2009, a position he held until April 23, 2018. In addition to EVP and General Manager, he also served as the club's Alternate Governor. Fletcher led the team to six consecutive playoff appearances from 2013 to 2018.

Fletcher's tenure with the Wild was notable for his draft record, selecting a total of twenty-eight future NHL players across nine drafts including Nick Leddy, Darcy Kuemper, Erik Haula, Mikael Granlund, Jason Zucker, Jonas Brodin, Nick Seeler, Matt Dumba, Carson Soucy, Alex Tuch, Kaapo Kahkonen, Joel Eriksson Ek, Jordan Greenway, Kirill Kaprizov, Luke Kunin, and Brandon Duhaime.

Fletcher also made significant additions via both trades and free agent signings. Most notably, Fletcher signed the two most prominent players in the 2012 Unrestricted Free Agent class: Zach Parise and Ryan Suter, changing the Wild's roster and outlook overnight. He also identified and signed multiple Free Agent prospects who would go on to make their NHL debuts for the Wild, including Jared Spurgeon, Christian Folin, and Mike Reilly. On the trade front, Fletcher made moves to acquire long-term parts of the Wild franchise without giving up regulars from his roster when he acquired players like Charlie Coyle, Mike Rupp, Jason Pominville, Nino Niederreiter, Devan Dubnyk, and Marcus Foligno.

==== GM record ====
During his Minnesota tenure, Fletcher was the General Manager for 704 regular season games, compiling a record of 359-265-80 (0.567 point percentage), both ranking first in franchise history at the time of his departure.

=== New Jersey Devils (first stint) ===
Following his time with the Wild, Fletcher reunited with Shero, who was serving as the General Manager of the New Jersey Devils. Fletcher served as Senior Advisor to Shero starting on June 28th, 2018, until he was hired as General Manager of the Philadelphia Flyers.

=== Philadelphia Flyers ===
On December 3, 2018, Fletcher was hired mid-season by the Philadelphia Flyers to serve as their General Manager and Alternate Governor. He was the ninth general manager in Flyers' franchise history (eighth person to be General Manager) and the first since 1990 who was not previously a player on the team. When Paul Holmgren resigned as President, Fletcher succeeded him, holding the positions of both President and General Manager until March, 2023.

Fletcher led the team to the second round of the playoffs in the 2019-20 season during the COVID-19 bubble.

During his tenure, Fletcher drafted ten future NHL players across four drafts, including Cam York, Bobby Brink, Tyson Foerster, Emil Andrae, Aleksei Kolosov, Ty Murchison, Cutter Gauthier, and Alex Bump.

Fletcher also added to his roster with notable trades, particularly in two off-seasons. In 2019, on June 14th, Fletcher acquired Matt Niskanen from the Washington Capitals in exchange for Radko Gudas. Then, on June 18th, Fletcher traded for Justin Braun from the San Jose Sharks in exchange for a 2019 second round pick and a 2020 third round pick. In the 2021 off-season, on July 23, Fletcher acquired Rasmus Ristolainen from the Buffalo Sabres in exchange for Robert Hägg, a 2021 first round pick and a 2023 second round pick. The next day, he acquired Cam Atkinson from the Columbus Blue Jackets in exchange for Jakub Voracek. On March 19, 2022, Fletcher traded longtime captain Claude Giroux to the Florida Panthers in exchange for Owen Tippett, a 2024 first round pick and a 2023 third round pick.

==== GM record ====
While running Philadelphia, Fletcher was the General Manager for 329 games, compiling a record of 141-145-43 (0.494 point percentage). At the time of his departure, he ranked fifth in franchise history.

=== New Jersey Devils (Second Stint) ===
On August 1, 2024, Fletcher began serving as Senior Advisor to the New Jersey Devils General Manager Tom Fitzgerald, reuniting Fletcher with another colleague from the Stanley Cup winning front office in Pittsburgh.

On May 1, 2026, after firing Fitzgerald, the Devils announced that Fletcher's contract would not be renewed.

=== Seattle Kraken ===
On September 16, 2026, Fletcher began serving as Senior Advisor to Seattle Kraken General Manager Jason Botterill, reuniting Fletcher with another colleague from the Stanley Cup winning front office in Pittsburgh.

=== Media personality ===
Following his time with the Flyers, Fletcher joined Sportsnet, sharing his first-hand experience during on-air coverage for key NHL-newsworthy broadcasts including the 2023 and 2024 NHL Entry Draft and the 2024 NHL Trade Deadline.

== Personal life ==
A Montreal native, Fletcher is the son of Hockey Hall of Fame executive Cliff Fletcher (Calgary Flames, Toronto Maple Leafs, Phoenix Coyotes, and Tampa Bay Lightning.) He and his wife Rhonda have two children.

Preceded by Bill Torrey	Interim General Manager of the Florida Panthers; 2001–2002	Succeeded by Rick Dudley
Preceded by Doug Risebrough	General Manager of the Minnesota Wild; 2009–2018	Succeeded by Paul Fenton
Preceded by Ron Hextall	General Manager of the Philadelphia Flyers; 2018–2023	Succeeded by Daniel Briere
