= Dirty (disambiguation) =

Dirty, not clean.

Dirty may also refer to:

== Places ==
- Dirty Mountain, a mountain in Wyoming
- Dirty Point, a summit in Cibola County, New Mexico

== People ==
- "Dirty" Dan Denton, a professional wrestler from All Star Wrestling
- "Dirty" Dick Slater, a former American professional wrestler
- "Dirty John" Meehan, the antagonist of the podcast Dirty John

== Arts, entertainment, and media ==
=== Films ===
- Dirty (1998 film), a Canadian comedy-drama film
- Dirty (2005 film), an American crime-drama film
- Dirty (2020 film), an American short LGBT romance film

=== Music ===
==== Groups and labels ====
- Dirty (group), a rap duo from Alabama
- Dirty Records, a New Zealand hip hop record label

==== Albums ====
- Dirty (Aborym album), 2013
- Dirty (Malina Moye album), 2023
- Dirty (One-Eyed Doll album), 2012
- Dirty (Sonic Youth album), 1992

==== Songs ====
- "Dirty" (Sevendust song), a 2018 song by Sevendust
- "Dirty" (Jessie Murph and Teddy Swims song), 2024
- "Dirty", a song by Audio Adrenaline from Worldwide
- "Dirty", a song by Basshunter from his Calling Time album
- "Dirty", a song by Grandson from Death of an Optimist
- "Dirty", a song by Korn from Issues
- "Dirty", a song by Oliver Tree from Love You Madly Hate You Badly
- "Dirty", a song by Pitbull from M.I.A.M.I.
- "Dirty", a song by Underworld, under their alias Lemon Interrupt, 1992

== Other uses in arts, entertainment, and media ==
- Dirty (TV series), a television series in development at Amazon
- Dirty John (TV series), a TV series based on the eponymous podcast

== Other uses ==
- Dirty (computer science), containing data which need to be written back to a larger memory

== See also ==
- "Dirrty", a 2002 song by Christina Aguilera
- Derrty Entertainment, American record label
- Dirt (disambiguation)
- DIRTI 5, five unavoidable fixed costs of production
- Filth (disambiguation)
