= Sloppy Seconds =

Sloppy Seconds may refer to:

- Sloppy seconds, a sexual practice
- Sloppy Seconds (band), an American punk band
- Sloppy Seconds (album), a 1972 album by Dr. Hook & the Medicine Show
- Sloppy Seconds, a 1989 album by T.T. Quick
- Sloppy Seconds, two volumes of mixtapes by CunninLynguists
- Sloppy Seconds: The Tucker Max Leftovers, a 2012 book by Tucker Max
- "Sloppy Seconds", a song on the 2013 album Cardboard Castles by George Watsky

== See also ==
- Sloppy (disambiguation)
