= Dirt (disambiguation) =

Dirt is a blanket term for unclean matter.

Dirt may also refer to:

- Soil, that is found on the ground

== Literature ==
- Dirt (novel), the second novel in the Stone Barrington series by Stuart Woods
- Dirt: The Erosion of Civilizations, a non-fiction book by David R. Montgomery
- The Dirt, 2001 autobiography of American hard rock band Mötley Crüe
- Dirt (magazine), an American lifestyle magazine for young men

== Film and TV ==
- Dirt (1965 film), directed by Piero Heliczer and produced by Andy Warhol
- Dirt (1979 film), a documentary film directed by Eric Karson
- Dirt (1994 film), a Chinese film directed by Guan Hu
- Dirt (1998 film), directed by Chel White
- Dirt (2003 film), directed by Nancy Savoca
- Dirt (TV series)
- Dirt! The Movie, a 2009 ecological documentary
- The Dirt (film), a 2019 American biopic Mötley Crüe film
- Dirt (Bluey), an episode of the Australian animated television series Bluey
- Dirt, a web series by the Brat network

== Racing and games ==
- Dirt jumping, the practice of riding bikes over jumps
- Dirt (series), a series of rally racing video games
- D.i.R.T.: Origin of the Species, a 2006 video game
- Dirt, a major derivative of the AberMUD online game server software

== Music ==
=== Albums ===
- Dirt (Alice in Chains album), 1992, or its title track
- Dirt (The Arrogant Worms album), 1999
- D.I.R.T. (Da Incredible Rap Team), 2008 album by Heltah Skeltah
- Dirt (Kids in Glass Houses album), 2010
- Dirt (Dean Brody album), 2012

=== Songs ===
- "Dirt" (Florida Georgia Line song), 2014
- "Dirt" (Key Glock song), 2023
- "The Dirt" (song), a song by Benjamin Ingrosso
- "Dirt", a song from Christie Front Drive's self-titled EP, 1994
- "Dirt", a song from Emma Blackery's album Villains, 2018
- "Dirt", a song from King Gizzard and the Lizard Wizard's album Paper Mâché Dream Balloon, 2015
- "Dirt", a song from Phish's album Farmhouse, 2000
- "Dirt", a song from The Stooges' album Fun House, 1970
- "Dirt", a song from Waylon Jennings' album Cowboys, Sisters, Rascals & Dirt, 1993

== Others ==
- Dirt cake, a dessert food made of chocolate pudding and Oreos
- Dirt, slang for gossip, blackmail or slander against a person

== Acronyms ==
- DIRT, Interval training: Distance, Interval, Repetitions, Time
- DIRT, Deposit interest retention tax, a form of tax in the Republic of Ireland

== See also ==
- Dirty (disambiguation)
- Joe Dirt, a 2001 American cult film starring David Spade
