= Sloppy =

Sloppy may refer to:

- Sloppy Thurston (1899–1973), American baseball player
- Sloppy Smurf, a Smurfs character
- Sloppy, sister of Slimey the Worm, a pet of Oscar the Grouch in the children's television series Sesame Street
- Sloppy, title character in the 2012 film Sloppy the Psychotic

== See also ==
- Dirty (disambiguation)
- Filth (disambiguation)
- Messy (disambiguation)
- Slop (disambiguation)
