= Stéphane Robidas =

Canadian ice hockey player (born 1977)

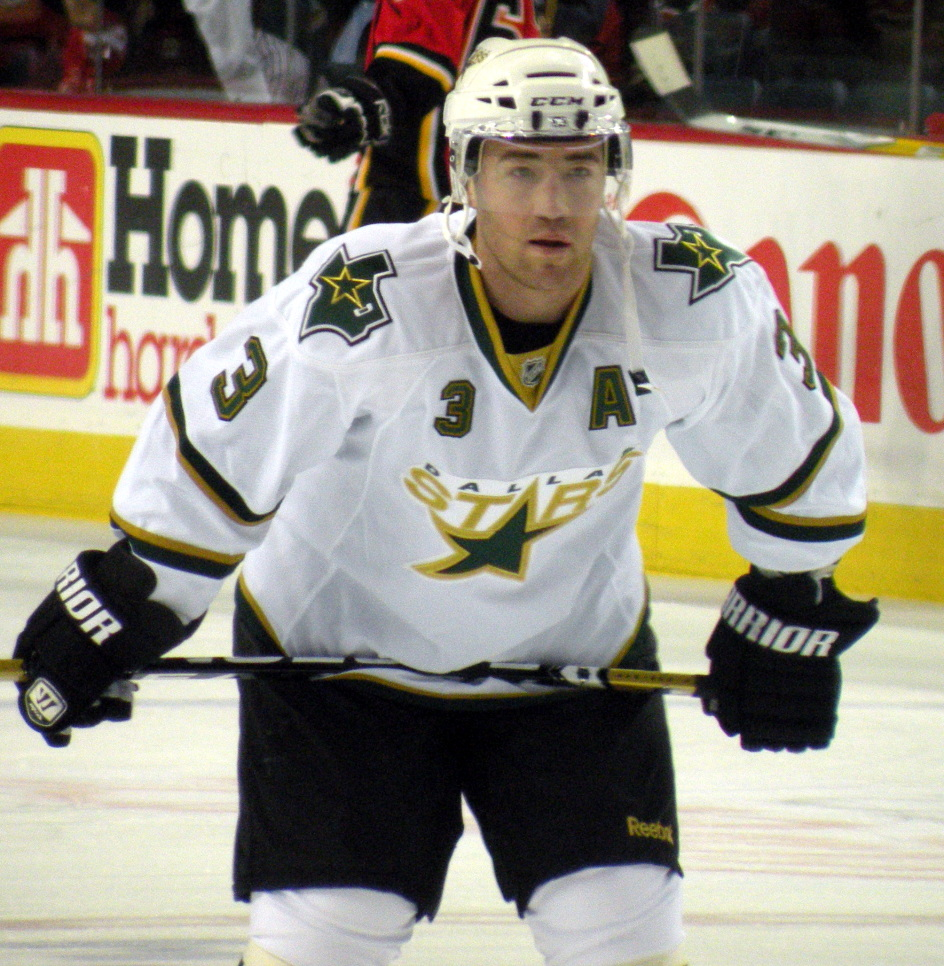
- Robidas with the Dallas Stars in March 2009
- Born: March 3, 1977 (age 49) Sherbrooke, Quebec, Canada
- Height: 5 ft 11 in (180 cm)
- Weight: 196 lb (89 kg; 14 st 0 lb)
- Position: Defence
- Shot: Right
- Played for: Montreal Canadiens; Dallas Stars; Chicago Blackhawks; Frankfurt Lions; HIFK; Anaheim Ducks; Toronto Maple Leafs
- National team: Canada
- NHL draft: 164th overall, 1995; Montreal Canadiens
- Playing career: 1997–2015

Joseph Pierre Stéphane Robidas /ˈroʊbɪdɑː/ (born March 3, 1977) is a Canadian former professional ice hockey defenceman and currently an assistant coach for the Montreal Canadiens.

Robidas played over 900 games in the NHL, most of which came within the Dallas Stars' organization. He also played for the Montreal Canadiens, Chicago Blackhawks, Anaheim Ducks, and Toronto Maple Leafs.

== Playing career ==
=== Amateur ===
As a youth, Robidas played in the 1990 and 1991 Quebec International Pee-Wee Hockey Tournaments with a minor ice hockey team from Sherbrooke, Quebec.

=== Montreal Canadiens ===
Robidas was selected 164th overall by the Montreal Canadiens in the 7th round of the 1995 NHL entry draft. During his three seasons with the Canadiens, Robidas recorded 23 points in 122 games.

=== Dallas Stars ===
On October 4, 2002, Robidas was claimed by the Atlanta Thrashers as part of the NHL Waiver Draft, and subsequently was dealt to the Dallas Stars for a 6th round selection in 2002. He appeared in a career-high 76 games during the 2002–03 NHL season.

=== Chicago Blackhawks ===
Robidas was traded to the Chicago Blackhawks in November 2003 for Jon Klemm and a fourth round selection in the 2004 NHL entry draft. Robidas skated in 45 games for the Blackhawks during the subsequent season. Due to the 2004–05 NHL lockout, Robidas played for the Frankfurt Lions of the Deutsche Eishockey Liga (DEL) during the entire 2004–05 lockout season. Later in the season, he was joined on the team by fellow NHLer Doug Weight, and the pair became fan favorites.

=== Return to Dallas ===
In August 2005, following the lockout, Robidas returned to the Stars by signing a two-year contract.

In December 2006 the Stars signed him to a three-year, USD$4.5 million contract extension. On March 17, 2007, he was punched while charging Jordin Tootoo of the Nashville Predators after Mike Modano had been checked by Tootoo. Tootoo still had his gloves on when he punched Robidas, and he hit Robidas square in the face. Robidas went down hard and was taken off the ice on a stretcher. He was taken to a hospital for examination. He later checked out of the hospital after being diagnosed with a concussion and flew back to Dallas with the team.

During the 2008 NHL playoffs against the Anaheim Ducks in game 5, Robidas took a clearing shot from Todd Marchant off the face that broke his nose. He returned to the game after receiving stitches and had a solid outing even though Dallas came up short 5–2. The next game in Dallas, Robidas scored the game tying goal shortly before he would set up Stu Barnes for the series-clinching goal, as Dallas went on to defeat the Anaheim Ducks 4–1 and take the series 4–2 on home ice.

Robidas was selected to play in the 57th NHL All-Star Game in Montreal despite having suffered a broken jaw.

Robidas won TSN's "No Guts, No Glory" contest, an unofficial award for the 2008–09 NHL season's toughest player. He was selected as the winner after a loose puck had broken his jaw in a game against the Phoenix Coyotes; Robidas missed only one shift after the incident and played more minutes than any skater in that game.

He was also placed on a stand-by list by Team Canada for the 2010 Winter Olympics should an injury occur during the tournament.

=== Anaheim Ducks ===
During the 2013–14 season, on November 29, 2013 against the Chicago Blackhawks Robidas broke his right leg in a collision with the boards behind the net. Nearing a return to full health, Robidas was traded to the Anaheim Ducks for a 2014 fourth-round draft pick on March 4, 2014. During the 2014 Stanley Cup Playoffs, in his first game back in Dallas as a member of the Ducks, Robidas fractured his right leg again just above the previous fracture.

=== Toronto Maple Leafs ===
On July 1, 2014, Robidas signed a three-year, $9 million contract with the Toronto Maple Leafs. In poor health due to two leg fractures sustained during the 13–14 season, Robidas, after one season with the Leafs, sat out the entirety of the 2015–16 and 2016–17 seasons. Robidas' extended time on Long Term Injured Reserve (LTIR) created a phrase, "Robidas Island", which refers to a player being placed on LTIR while being expected to never return to the team for the duration of his contract.

== Coaching career ==
Robidas joined the Maple Leafs' front office as a consultant in January 2017, effectively signalling his retirement from playing professional hockey. He became an assistant director of player development in September 2017 and was promoted to become the director of player development in August 2018.

In July, 2022, Robidas was hired as an assistant coach by the Canadiens. He replaced Luke Richardson, who was hired as the new head coach of the Chicago Blackhawks earlier that summer.

== Personal life ==
Robidas's son, Justin, was a fifth-round draft pick for the Carolina Hurricanes in 2021.

== Career statistics ==
=== Regular season and playoffs ===
			Regular season					Playoffs
Season	Team	League	GP	G	A	Pts	PIM	GP	G	A	Pts	PIM
1992–93	Magog Cantonniers	QMAAA	41	3	12	15	16	5	1	1	2	2
1993–94	Shawinigan Cataractes	QMJHL	67	3	18	21	33	1	0	0	0	0
1994–95	Shawinigan Cataractes	QMJHL	71	13	56	69	44	15	7	12	19	4
1995–96	Shawinigan Cataractes	QMJHL	67	23	56	79	53	6	1	5	6	10
1996–97	Shawinigan Cataractes	QMJHL	67	24	52	75	59	7	4	6	10	14
1997–98	Fredericton Canadiens	AHL	79	10	21	31	50	4	0	2	2	0
1998–99	Fredericton Canadiens	AHL	79	8	33	41	59	15	1	5	6	10
1999–2000	Quebec Citadelles	AHL	76	14	31	45	36	3	0	1	1	0
1999–2000	Montreal Canadiens	NHL	1	0	0	0	0	—	—	—	—	—
2000–01	Montreal Canadiens	NHL	65	6	6	12	14	—	—	—	—	—
2001–02	Montreal Canadiens	NHL	56	1	10	11	14	2	0	0	0	4
2002–03	Dallas Stars	NHL	76	3	7	10	35	12	0	1	1	20
2003–04	Dallas Stars	NHL	14	1	0	1	8	—	—	—	—	—
2003–04	Chicago Blackhawks	NHL	45	2	10	12	33	—	—	—	—	—
2004–05	Frankfurt Lions	DEL	51	15	32	47	64	6	1	2	3	6
2005–06	Dallas Stars	NHL	75	5	15	20	67	5	0	2	2	4
2006–07	Dallas Stars	NHL	75	0	17	17	86	7	0	1	1	2
2007–08	Dallas Stars	NHL	82	9	17	26	85	18	3	8	11	12
2008–09	Dallas Stars	NHL	72	3	23	26	76	—	—	—	—	—
2009–10	Dallas Stars	NHL	82	10	31	41	70	—	—	—	—	—
2010–11	Dallas Stars	NHL	81	5	25	30	67	—	—	—	—	—
2011–12	Dallas Stars	NHL	75	5	17	22	48	—	—	—	—	—
2012–13	HIFK	SM-l	15	2	3	5	22	—	—	—	—	—
2012–13	Dallas Stars	NHL	48	1	12	13	56	—	—	—	—	—
2013–14	Dallas Stars	NHL	24	4	1	5	12	—	—	—	—	—
2013–14	Anaheim Ducks	NHL	14	1	4	5	8	3	0	0	0	2
2014–15	Toronto Maple Leafs	NHL	52	1	6	7	34	—	—	—	—	—
NHL totals			937	57	201	258	713	47	3	12	15	44

=== International ===
Year	Team	Event	Result	GP	G	A	Pts	PIM
2001	Canada	WC	5th	7	0	1	1	0
2006	Canada	WC	4th	9	1	1	2	6
2013	Canada	WC	5th	8	0	3	3	6
Senior totals				24	1	5	6	12

== Awards and honours ==
Award	Year
QMJHL
First All-Star Team	1996, 1997
CHL Third All-Star Team	1996
Emile Bouchard Trophy	1997
CHL Second All-Star Team	1997
NHL
All-Star Game	2009
