= Filthy =

Filthy primarily refers to dirt. It may also refer to:

== Music ==
=== Albums ===
- Filthy!, 1972 album by Papa John Creach
- Filthy, 1988 album by The Egyptian Lover

=== Songs ===
- Filthy, a 2013 EP by The Bug
- "Filthy" (song), a 2018 Justin Timberlake song
- "Filthy", a 1995 charting double A-side with "Only Love Can Break Your Heart" 1990, covered as single "Jungle Pulse" by Étienne Daho

== Other ==
- Filthy, another nickname of Dirty John
- Filthy, 2017 film by Tereza Nvotová
- F1lthy, American producer

== See also ==
- Filth (disambiguation)
