= 2008 Stanley Cup playoffs =

Tournament details
- Dates: April 9 – June 4, 2008
- Teams: 16
- Defending champions: Anaheim Ducks

Final positions
- Champions: Detroit Red Wings
- Runners-up: Pittsburgh Penguins

Tournament statistics
- Scoring leader(s): Henrik Zetterberg (Red Wings) & Sidney Crosby (Penguins) (27 points)

Awards
- MVP: Henrik Zetterberg (Red Wings)

The 2008 Stanley Cup playoffs of the National Hockey League (NHL) began on April 9, 2008, after the 2007–08 regular season. The 16 teams that qualified, eight from each conference, played best-of-seven series for conference quarterfinals, semifinals and championships, then the conference champions played a best-of-seven series for the Stanley Cup.

The Buffalo Sabres became the second team to miss the playoffs after winning the Presidents' Trophy in the prior season. This would not happen again until 2015.

The Finals ended on June 4, 2008, with the Detroit Red Wings defeating the Pittsburgh Penguins in six games to win their eleventh championship and their fourth in eleven seasons. Red Wings winger Henrik Zetterberg was awarded the Conn Smythe Trophy as the playoffs' Most Valuable Player. Sidney Crosby and Zetterberg led the tournament with 27 points.

As of 2026, this is the most recent season that a Presidents' Trophy winner went on to also win the Stanley Cup in a full 82-game season, let alone making the Final, and the only time it has happened since the implementation of a salary cap as a result of the 2004–05 NHL lockout.

== Highlights ==
The San Jose Sharks were the media's favorite to win the Cup going into the playoffs, having gone the entire month of March without a regulation loss and nearly finishing first overall during the regular season.

=== Milestones ===
In game one of the Western Conference quarterfinals against the Minnesota Wild, captain Joe Sakic of the Colorado Avalanche extended his record for playoff overtime goals to eight, with a goal 11:11 into overtime. Chris Chelios appeared in his 248th career playoff game surpassing Patrick Roy for most career playoff games of all time.

In game one of the Western Conference semifinals in San Jose, Dallas Stars center Brad Richards tied an NHL record for most points in one period of a playoff game, when he recorded one goal and three assists in the third period.

In the Western Conference semifinals against the Avalanche, Johan Franzen became the first player to score multiple hat tricks in a series since Jari Kurri tallied three in 1985. In the process, he set an NHL record for most goals in a four-game sweep and the Red Wings' record for most goals in a playoff series with nine, beating the previous record of eight set by Gordie Howe in 1949. Franzen achieved this feat in only four games, moreover, while Howe achieved it in seven.

Game six of the Western Conference semifinals between the Sharks and Stars was the eighth-longest game in the history of the NHL, lasting 129:03. Stars captain Brenden Morrow ended the game at 9:03 of the fourth overtime, tapping in a power-play goal. Goaltenders Marty Turco and Evgeni Nabokov set team records for saves in a game with 61 and 53, respectively. The final score was 2–1.

Detroit captain Nicklas Lidstrom became the first European (and Swedish) born and trained player to lead an NHL team to the Stanley Cup. Charlie Gardiner (born in the United Kingdom) and Johnny Gottselig (born in Russia) both won the Stanley Cup as captains of the Chicago Blackhawks in 1934 and 1938 respectively, but they were both raised in Canada.

=== New interpretation of NHL rule ===
In game three of their Eastern Conference Quarterfinal series, while on a five-on-three power play, the New York Rangers' Sean Avery tried to screen the New Jersey Devils' goaltender Martin Brodeur by waving his hands and stick while facing Brodeur. This prompted the NHL to issue an interpretation of the league's rules, stating that an unsportsmanlike conduct minor penalty will be called on actions such as the one used by Avery.

== Playoff seeds ==
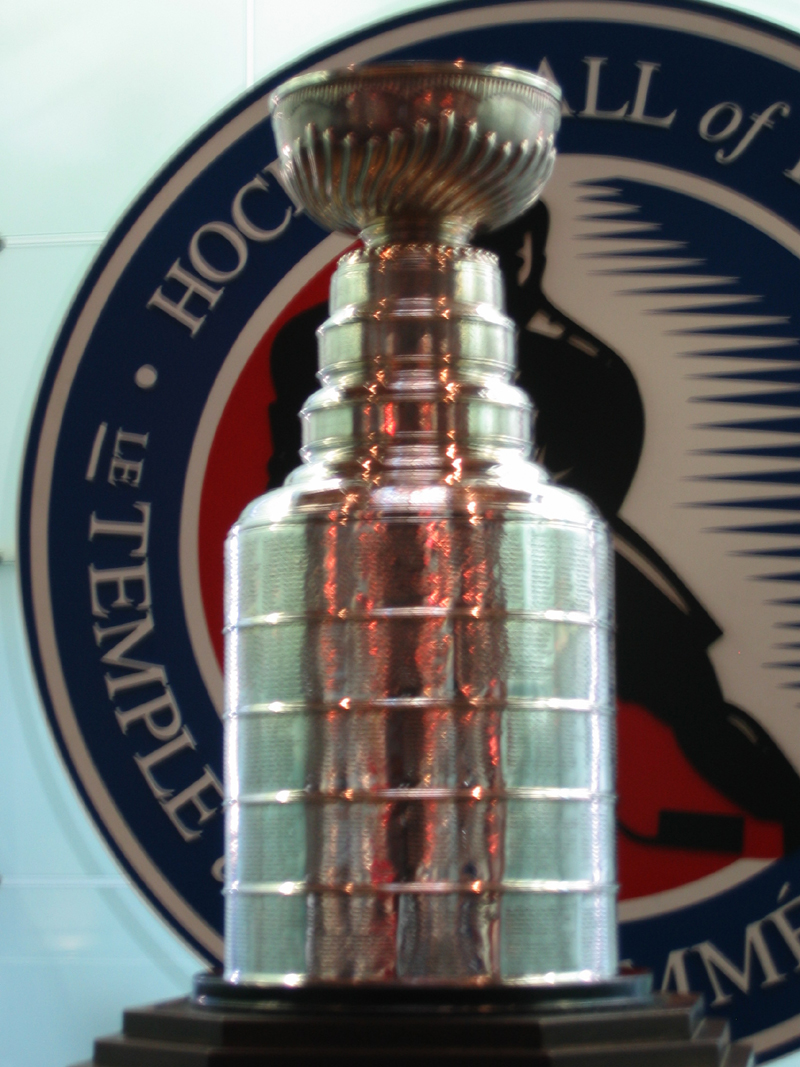
The Stanley Cup

The top eight teams in each conference qualified for the playoffs. The top three seeds in each conference were awarded to the division winners; while the five remaining spots were awarded to the highest finishers in their respective conferences.

The following teams qualified for the playoffs:

=== Eastern Conference ===
1. Montreal Canadiens, Northeast Division champions, Eastern Conference regular season champions – 104 points
2. Pittsburgh Penguins, Atlantic Division champions – 102 points
3. Washington Capitals, Southeast Division champions – 94 points
4. New Jersey Devils – 99 points
5. New York Rangers – 97 points
6. Philadelphia Flyers – 95 points
7. Ottawa Senators – 94 points (43 wins)
8. Boston Bruins – 94 points (41 wins)

=== Western Conference ===
1. Detroit Red Wings, Central Division champions, Western Conference regular season champions, President's Trophy winners – 115 points
2. San Jose Sharks, Pacific Division champions – 108 points
3. Minnesota Wild, Northwest Division champions – 98 points
4. Anaheim Ducks – 102 points
5. Dallas Stars – 97 points
6. Colorado Avalanche – 95 points
7. Calgary Flames – 94 points
8. Nashville Predators – 91 points

== Playoff bracket ==
In each round, teams competed in a best-of-seven series following a 2–2–1–1–1 format (scores in the bracket indicate the number of games won in each best-of-seven series). The team with home ice advantage played at home for games one and two (and games five and seven, if necessary), and the other team played at home for games three and four (and game six, if necessary). The top eight teams in each conference made the playoffs, with the three division winners seeded 1–3 based on regular season record, and the five remaining teams seeded 4–8.

The NHL used "re-seeding" instead of a fixed bracket playoff system. During the first three rounds, the highest remaining seed in each conference was matched against the lowest remaining seed, the second-highest remaining seed played the second-lowest remaining seed, and so forth. The higher-seeded team was awarded home ice advantage. The two conference winners then advanced to the Stanley Cup Final, where home ice advantage was awarded to the team that had the better regular season record.

Conference quarterfinals	Conference semifinals
1	Montreal	4
8	Boston	3
1	Montreal	1
6	Philadelphia	4
2	Pittsburgh	4
7	Ottawa	0
Eastern Conference
3	Washington	3
6	Philadelphia	4
2	Pittsburgh	4
5	NY Rangers	1
4	New Jersey	1
5	NY Rangers	4
1	Detroit	4
8	Nashville	2
1	Detroit	4
6	Colorado	0
2	San Jose	4
7	Calgary	3
Western Conference
3	Minnesota	2
6	Colorado	4
2	San Jose	2
5	Dallas	4
4	Anaheim	2
5	Dallas	4

Conference finals
6	Philadelphia	1
2	Pittsburgh	4
1	Detroit	4
5	Dallas	2

Stanley Cup Final
E2	Pittsburgh	2
W1	Detroit	4

== Conference quarterfinals ==
=== Eastern Conference quarterfinals ===
==== (1) Montreal Canadiens vs. (8) Boston Bruins ====
The Montreal Canadiens entered the playoffs as the Eastern Conference regular season and Northeast Division champions with 104 points. Boston qualified as the eighth seed earning 94 points (losing the tie-breaker in total wins with Ottawa) during the regular season. This was the 31st playoff meeting between these two Original Six rivals, with Montreal winning twenty-three of the thirty previous series. They last met in the 2004 Eastern Conference quarterfinals where Montreal won in seven games. Montreal won all eight games during this year's regular season series.

The Canadiens held off Boston winning the series in seven games. Montreal took the lead early in game one and never looked back in a 4–1 victory. The Bruins forced overtime in game two by scoring two third period goals before coming up short in the first overtime as Alexei Kovalev ended the game with a power-play goal at 2:30 for Montreal. Boston forward Marc Savard scored the overtime winner in a 2–1 game three victory; the win ended a 13-game losing streak against Montreal by the Bruins. Patrice Brisebois scored the only goal of game four for the Canadiens and Carey Price made 27 saves for his first career playoff shutout in a 1–0 win. Boston scored five unanswered goals in game five, including four goals in the third period as they extended the series with a 5–1 win. For the second game in a row the Bruins scored four times in the third period as they tied the series with a 5–4 victory. In game seven Montreal rebounded from the lackluster performances of their previous two games and eliminated Boston with a 5–0 win.

April 10	Boston Bruins	1–4	Montreal Canadiens	Bell Centre	Recap
Shane Hnidy (1) – 08:34		First period	00:34 – Sergei Kostitsyn (1); 02:02 – Andrei Kostitsyn (1)
No scoring		Second period	05:16 – Bryan Smolinski (1)
No scoring		Third period	07:24 – Tom Kostopoulos (1)
Tim Thomas 28 saves / 32 shots		Goalie stats	Carey Price 17 saves / 18 shots

April 12	Boston Bruins	2–3	OT	Montreal Canadiens	Bell Centre	Recap
No scoring		First period		18:30 – Roman Hamrlik (1)
No scoring		Second period		01:50 – Sergei Kostitsyn (2)
Peter Schaefer (1) – 03:58; David Krejci (1) – pp – 09:34		Third period		No scoring
No scoring		First overtime period		02:30 – pp – Alexei Kovalev (1)
Tim Thomas 28 saves / 31 shots		Goalie stats		Carey Price 37 saves / 39 shots

April 13	Montreal Canadiens	1–2	OT	Boston Bruins	TD Banknorth Garden	Recap
No scoring		First period		06:30 – Milan Lucic (1)
Tom Kostopoulos (2) – 04:26		Second period		No scoring
No scoring		Third period		No scoring
No scoring		First overtime period		09:25 – Marc Savard (1)
Carey Price 29 saves / 31 shots		Goalie stats		Tim Thomas 27 saves / 28 shots

April 15	Montreal Canadiens	1–0	Boston Bruins	TD Banknorth Garden	Recap
No scoring		First period	No scoring
Patrice Brisebois (1) – pp – 19:18		Second period	No scoring
No scoring		Third period	No scoring
Carey Price 27 saves / 27 shots		Goalie stats	Tim Thomas 27 saves / 28 shots

April 17	Boston Bruins	5–1	Montreal Canadiens	Bell Centre	Recap
No scoring		First period	09:47 – Alexei Kovalev (2)
Phil Kessel (1) – pp – 07:45		Second period	No scoring
Glen Metropolit (1) – 03:31; Zdeno Chara (1) – pp – 05:49; Marco Sturm (1) – sh – 15:13; Vladimir Sobotka (1) – 17:48		Third period	No scoring
Tim Thomas 31 saves / 32 shots		Goalie stats	Carey Price 19 saves / 24 shots

April 19	Montreal Canadiens	4–5	Boston Bruins	TD Banknorth Garden	Recap
Chris Higgins (1) – 09:44		First period	No scoring
Tomas Plekanec (1) – 07:43		Second period	01:54 – Phil Kessel (2)
Francis Bouillon (1) – 10:04; Chris Higgins (2) – 15:56		Third period	03:13 – Vladimir Sobotka (2); 12:13 – Milan Lucic (2); 15:45 – Phil Kessel (3); 17:23 – Marco Sturm (2)
Carey Price 31 saves / 36 shots		Goalie stats	Tim Thomas 31 saves / 35 shots

April 21	Boston Bruins	0–5	Montreal Canadiens	Bell Centre	Recap
No scoring		First period	03:31 – Mike Komisarek (1)
No scoring		Second period	10:45 – Mark Streit (1); 15:13 – Andrei Kostitsyn (2)
No scoring		Third period	17:58 – pp – Andrei Kostitsyn (3); 19:52 – Sergei Kostitsyn (3)
Tim Thomas 30 saves / 35 shots		Goalie stats	Carey Price 25 saves / 25 shots

Montreal won series 4–3

==== (2) Pittsburgh Penguins vs. (7) Ottawa Senators ====
The Pittsburgh Penguins entered the playoffs as the Atlantic Division champions, earning the second seed in the Eastern Conference with 102 points. Ottawa qualified as the seventh seed earning 94 points (winning the tie-breaker in total wins with Boston) during the regular season. This was the second playoff meeting between these two teams, with Ottawa winning the only previous series. They last met in the previous year's Eastern Conference quarterfinals where Ottawa won in five games. Ottawa won three of the four games during this year's regular season series.

The Penguins swept the Senators in four games. Marc-Andre Fleury made 26 saves and Gary Roberts scored twice as the Penguins won game one by a score of 4–0. Penguins forward Ryan Malone put Pittsburgh ahead again in game two after they blew a three-goal lead earlier in the game with a power-play goal at 18:58 of the third period; the Penguins held on for a 5–3 victory. Sidney Crosby's goal in the opening seconds of the third period of game three broke a 1–1 tie as Pittsburgh eventually won 4–1. Pittsburgh completed the series sweep in game four with a 3–1 win.

April 9	Ottawa Senators	0–4	Pittsburgh Penguins	Mellon Arena	Recap
No scoring		First period	01:08 – Gary Roberts (1); 12:28 – Petr Sykora (1)
No scoring		Second period	No scoring
No scoring		Third period	13:58 – Evgeni Malkin (1); 18:25 – pp – Gary Roberts (2)
Martin Gerber 31 saves / 35 shots		Goalie stats	Marc-Andre Fleury 26 saves / 26 shots

April 11	Ottawa Senators	3–5	Pittsburgh Penguins	Mellon Arena	Recap
No scoring		First period	16:10 – pp – Sergei Gonchar (1)
Shean Donovan (1) – 11:25; Cory Stillman (1) – pp – 16:11		Second period	05:22 – pp – Petr Sykora (2); 10:52 – Petr Sykora (3)
Cody Bass (1) – 08:51		Third period	18:58 – pp – Ryan Malone (1); 19:53 – en – Ryan Malone (2)
Martin Gerber 49 saves / 53 shots		Goalie stats	Marc-Andre Fleury 27 saves / 30 shots

April 14	Pittsburgh Penguins	4–1	Ottawa Senators	Scotiabank Place	Recap
No scoring		First period	No scoring
Max Talbot (1) – 05:39		Second period	01:11 – Nick Foligno (1)
Sidney Crosby (1) – 00:12; Jordan Staal (1) – 01:30; Marian Hossa (1) – pp – 08:55		Third period	No scoring
Marc-Andre Fleury 33 saves / 34 shots		Goalie stats	Martin Gerber 34 saves / 38 shots

April 16	Pittsburgh Penguins	3–1	Ottawa Senators	Scotiabank Place	Recap
No scoring		First period	No scoring
Evgeni Malkin (2) – pp – 01:40; Jarkko Ruutu (1) – 15:28		Second period	10:31 – Cory Stillman (2)
Sidney Crosby (2) – en – 19:52		Third period	No scoring
Marc-Andre Fleury 21 saves / 22 shots		Goalie stats	Martin Gerber 31 saves / 33 shots

Pittsburgh won series 4–0

==== (3) Washington Capitals vs. (6) Philadelphia Flyers ====
The Washington Capitals entered the playoffs as the Southeast Division champions, earning the third seed in the Eastern Conference with 94 points. Philadelphia qualified as the sixth seed earning 95 points during the regular season. This was the fourth playoff meeting between these two teams, with Washington winning two of the three previous series. They last met in the 1989 Patrick Division semifinals where Philadelphia won in six games. Philadelphia won this year's four-game regular season series earning five of eight points.

The Flyers held off the Capitals in a seven-game series. Washington scored three times in the third period of game one as they overcame a two-goal deficit before Alexander Ovechkin scored the game-winner for the Capitals with just over four and a half minutes remaining in regulation time. Martin Biron made 24 saves as the Flyers won game two 2–0. The Flyers broke game three open with two goals just 17 seconds apart in the first period as they went on to win by a final score of 6–3. Philadelphia forward Mike Knuble ended game four at 6:40 of the second overtime period as the Flyers took a 3–1 series lead. Sergei Fedorov and Mike Green each recorded two points for Washington as they extended the series with a 3–2 victory. The Flyers took a two-goal lead early in the second period of game six before the Capitals responded with four unanswered goals to force a seventh and deciding game. Flyers goaltender Martin Biron made 39 saves in game seven and Joffrey Lupul scored a power-play goal in the first overtime as the Flyers advanced to the conference semifinals.

April 11	Philadelphia Flyers	4–5	Washington Capitals	Verizon Center	Recap
Vaclav Prospal (1) – 08:17		First period	03:16 – Donald Brashear (1)
Daniel Briere (1) – 11:46; Vaclav Prospal (2) – 12:19; Daniel Briere (2) – pp – 15:22		Second period	04:08 – Dave Steckel (1)
No scoring		Third period	01:50 – Mike Green (1); 06:26 – pp – Mike Green (2); 15:28 – Alexander Ovechkin (1)
Martin Biron 22 saves / 27 shots		Goalie stats	Cristobal Huet 18 saves / 22 shots

April 13	Philadelphia Flyers	2–0	Washington Capitals	Verizon Center	Recap
R. J. Umberger (1) – 05:53; Jeff Carter (1) – 15:17		First period	No scoring
No scoring		Second period	No scoring
No scoring		Third period	No scoring
Martin Biron 24 saves / 24 shots		Goalie stats	Cristobal Huet 39 saves / 41 shots

April 15	Washington Capitals	3–6	Philadelphia Flyers	Wachovia Center	Recap
Eric Fehr (1) – 17:21		First period	16:10 – Daniel Briere (3); 18:26 – Scott Hartnell (1); 18:43 – Sami Kapanen (1)
Mike Green (3) – pp – 07:28		Second period	19:50 – pp – Daniel Briere (4)
Brooks Laich (1) – 15:26		Third period	17:01 – ps – Mike Richards (1); 18:55 – en – Mike Knuble (1)
Cristobal Huet 27 saves / 32 shots		Goalie stats	Martin Biron 16 saves / 19 shots

April 17	Washington Capitals	3–4	2OT	Philadelphia Flyers	Wachovia Center	Recap
Nicklas Backstrom (1) – pp – 02:41; Alexander Semin (1) – pp – 12:59		First period		00:42 – Jeff Carter (2); 18:33 – Jeff Carter (3)
Steve Eminger (1) – 05:56		Second period		No scoring
No scoring		Third period		10:01 – pp – Daniel Briere (5)
No scoring		Second overtime period		06:40 – Mike Knuble (2)
Cristobal Huet 42 saves / 46 shots		Goalie stats		Martin Biron 38 saves / 41 shots

April 19	Philadelphia Flyers	2–3	Washington Capitals	Verizon Center	Recap
No scoring		First period	07:31 – pp – Nicklas Backstrom (2)
Vaclav Prospal (3) – pp – 12:35		Second period	01:25 – Sergei Fedorov (1)
Derian Hatcher (1) – 15:17		Third period	14:33 – pp – Alexander Semin (2)
Martin Biron 23 saves / 26 shots		Goalie stats	Cristobal Huet 30 saves / 32 shots

April 21	Washington Capitals	4–2	Philadelphia Flyers	Wachovia Center	Recap
No scoring		First period	03:49 – pp – Mike Richards (2)
Nicklas Backstrom (3) – 09:34; Alexander Semin (3) – 18:03		Second period	01:18 – pp – Daniel Briere (6)
Alexander Ovechkin (2) – 02:46; Alexander Ovechkin (3) – pp – 10:41		Third period	No scoring
Cristobal Huet 33 saves / 35 shots		Goalie stats	Martin Biron 36 saves / 40 shots

April 22	Philadelphia Flyers	3–2	OT	Washington Capitals	Verizon Center	Recap
Scottie Upshall (1) – pp – 15:38		First period		05:42 – pp – Nicklas Backstrom (4)
Sami Kapanen (2) – 09:47		Second period		15:29 – Alexander Ovechkin (4)
No scoring		Third period		No scoring
Joffrey Lupul (1) – pp – 06:06		First overtime period		No scoring
Martin Biron 39 saves / 41 shots		Goalie stats		Cristobal Huet 31 saves / 34 shots

Philadelphia won series 4–3

==== (4) New Jersey Devils vs. (5) New York Rangers ====
The New Jersey Devils entered the playoffs as the fourth seed in the Eastern Conference with 99 points. New York qualified as the fifth seed earning 97 points during the regular season. This was the fifth playoff meeting between these two teams, with the Rangers winning three of the four previous series. They last met in the 2006 Eastern Conference quarterfinals where New Jersey won in four games. New York won seven of the eight games during this year's regular season series.

The Rangers defeated the Devils in five games. Scott Gomez had three assists in game one against his former team as the Rangers won 4–1. New York scored twice in 23 seconds to break a scoreless tie in the third period of game two and Henrik Lundqvist allowed one goal against for the second consecutive game as the Rangers took a 2–0 series lead. During the second period of game three while on a two-man advantage, the Rangers' Sean Avery tried to screen New Jersey goaltender Martin Brodeur by waving his hands and stick while facing Brodeur. Devils forward John Madden ended the game at 6:01 of the first overtime in a 4–3 New Jersey victory. After the game the NHL issued an interpretation of the League's rules, stating that an unsportsmanlike conduct minor penalty would be called on actions such as the one used by Avery. Marc Staal broke a 3–3 tie for the Rangers late in third period of game four as New York took a 3–1 series lead. Rangers forward Jaromir Jagr had a goal and two assists as New York finished off the Devils in game five with a 5–3 win.

April 9	New York Rangers	4–1	New Jersey Devils	Prudential Center	Recap
No scoring		First period	No scoring
Brendan Shanahan (1) – 01:45		Second period	14:14 – pp – Paul Martin (1)
Ryan Callahan (1) – sh – 07:23; Sean Avery (1) – 17:07; Nigel Dawes (1) – en – 19:55		Third period	No scoring
Henrik Lundqvist 26 saves / 27 shots		Goalie stats	Martin Brodeur 24 saves / 27 shots

April 11	New York Rangers	2–1	New Jersey Devils	Prudential Center	Recap
No scoring		First period	No scoring
No scoring		Second period	No scoring
Jaromir Jagr (1) – 04:26; Sean Avery (2) – 04:49		Third period	18:37 – John Madden (1)
Henrik Lundqvist 26 saves / 27 shots		Goalie stats	Martin Brodeur 28 saves / 30 shots

April 13	New Jersey Devils	4–3	OT	New York Rangers	Madison Square Garden	Recap
Sergei Brylin (1) – 03:01		First period		12:17 – Brandon Dubinsky (1)
Patrik Elias (1) – pp – 12:56; Zach Parise (1) – pp – 15:19		Second period		06:50 – pp – Sean Avery (3)
No scoring		Third period		00:55 – pp – Brandon Dubinsky (2)
John Madden (2) – 06:01		First overtime period		No scoring
Martin Brodeur 27 saves / 30 shots		Goalie stats		Henrik Lundqvist 29 saves / 33 shots

April 16	New Jersey Devils	3–5	New York Rangers	Madison Square Garden	Recap
No scoring		First period	12:37 – pp – Scott Gomez (1)
Patrik Elias (2) – 00:31; Patrik Elias (3) – pp – 06:58		Second period	02:53 – Martin Straka (1); 12:39 – Chris Drury (1)
Mike Mottau (1) – 04:37		Third period	16:47 – Marc Staal (1); 19:47 – en – Scott Gomez (2)
Martin Brodeur 34 saves / 38 shots		Goalie stats	Henrik Lundqvist 28 saves / 31 shots

April 18	New York Rangers	5–3	New Jersey Devils	Prudential Center	Recap
Michal Rozsival (1) – 04:58; Jaromir Jagr (2) – pp – 06:38; Scott Gomez (3) – 18:01		First period	04:40 – Brian Gionta (1)
Chris Drury (2) – 05:35		Second period	09:26 – Bryce Salvador (1); 13:50 – pp – Patrik Elias (4)
Brandon Dubinsky (3) – en – 19:00		Third period	No scoring
Henrik Lundqvist 23 saves / 26 shots		Goalie stats	Martin Brodeur 18 saves / 22 shots

New York won series 4–1

=== Western Conference quarterfinals ===
==== (1) Detroit Red Wings vs. (8) Nashville Predators ====
The Detroit Red Wings entered the playoffs as the Presidents' Trophy winners, the Western Conference regular season and Central Division champions with 115 points. Nashville qualified as the eighth seed earning 91 points during the regular season. This was the second playoff meeting between these two teams, with Detroit winning the only previous series. They last met in the 2004 Western Conference quarterfinals where Detroit won in six games. Detroit won five of the eight games during this year's regular season series.

The Red Wings defeated Nashville in six games, with the home team winning the first five games. Nashville goaltender Dan Ellis made 37 saves in a losing effort and Henrik Zetterberg scored twice in the third period for the Red Wings as Detroit took game one by a final score of 3–1. Detroit forward Kris Draper broke the tie early in the second period of game two as the Red Wings won 4–2. Nashville scored two goals just nine seconds apart late in game three as Jason Arnott scored the game-winning goal in a 5–3 Predators victory. Red Wings goaltender Dominik Hasek was pulled in the second period of game four after allowing three goals; he was replaced by Chris Osgood for the remainder of the series, the Predators evened the series with a 3–2 win. Johan Franzen ended game five 1:48 into the first overtime as the Red Wings took a 2–1 victory. Detroit eliminated the Predators with a 20-save shutout from Chris Osgood in a 3–0 win in game six.

April 10	Nashville Predators	1–3	Detroit Red Wings	Joe Louis Arena	Recap
No scoring		First period	05:58 – Johan Franzen (1)
Jordin Tootoo (1) – 17:47		Second period	No scoring
No scoring		Third period	06:54 – Henrik Zetterberg (1); 19:41 – en – Henrik Zetterberg (2)
Dan Ellis 37 saves / 39 shots		Goalie stats	Dominik Hasek 19 saves / 20 shots

April 12	Nashville Predators	2–4	Detroit Red Wings	Joe Louis Arena	Recap
No scoring		First period	02:26 – Darren McCarty (1)
Alexander Radulov (1) – pp – 02:19; Jordin Tootoo (2) – 02:30		Second period	00:39 – pp – Nicklas Lidstrom (1); 05:00 – Kris Draper (1)
No scoring		Third period	10:03 – Tomas Holmstrom (1)
Dan Ellis 34 saves / 38 shots		Goalie stats	Dominik Hasek 25 saves / 27 shots

April 14	Detroit Red Wings	3–5	Nashville Predators	Sommet Center	Recap
Kris Draper (2) – 08:56		First period	No scoring
Jiri Hudler (1) – pp – 09:12		Second period	12:53 – Alexander Radulov (2); 15:01 – David Legwand (1)
Pavel Datsyuk (1) – 00:40		Third period	16:03 – Ryan Suter (1); 16:12 – Jason Arnott (1); 19:39 – en – Martin Erat (1)
Dominik Hasek 24 saves / 28 shots		Goalie stats	Dan Ellis 23 saves / 26 shots

April 16	Detroit Red Wings	2–3	Nashville Predators	Sommet Center	Recap
No scoring		First period	05:18 – pp – Dan Hamhuis (1); 05:50 – Shea Weber (1)
Pavel Datsyuk (2) – pp – 06:24		Second period	06:35 – Greg de Vries (1)
Pavel Datsyuk (3) – 03:23		Third period	No scoring
Dominik Hasek 11 saves / 14 shots Chris Osgood 13 saves / 13 shots		Goalie stats	Dan Ellis 39 saves / 41 shots

April 18	Nashville Predators	1–2	OT	Detroit Red Wings	Joe Louis Arena	Recap
No scoring		First period		04:20 – Valtteri Filppula (1)
No scoring		Second period		No scoring
Radek Bonk (1) – 19:16		Third period		No scoring
No scoring		First overtime period		01:48 – Johan Franzen (2)
Dan Ellis 52 saves / 54 shots		Goalie stats		Chris Osgood 20 saves / 21 shots

April 20	Detroit Red Wings	3–0	Nashville Predators	Sommet Center	Recap
No scoring		First period	No scoring
Nicklas Lidstrom (2) – sh – 13:44		Second period	No scoring
Jiri Hudler (2) – 03:52; Brian Rafalski (1) – en – 19:55		Third period	No scoring
Chris Osgood 20 saves / 20 shots		Goalie stats	Dan Ellis 40 saves / 42 shots

Detroit won series 4–2

==== (2) San Jose Sharks vs. (7) Calgary Flames ====
The San Jose Sharks entered the playoffs as the Pacific Division champions, earning the second seed in the Western Conference with 108 points. Calgary qualified as the seventh seed earning 94 points during the regular season. This was the third and most recent playoff meeting between these two teams, with the teams splitting the two previous series. They last met in the 2004 Western Conference Final where Calgary won in six games. Calgary won three of the four games during this year's regular season series.

San Jose eliminated the Flames in seven games. Stephane Yelle's second goal of the game was the game-winner as Calgary took the opening game of the series 3–2. San Jose goaltender Evgeni Nabokov recorded a shutout making 21 saves in game two to help the Sharks tie the series. The Flames rallied from a three-goal deficit to win game three 4–3 as backup goaltender Curtis Joseph relieved Miikka Kiprusoff after he was pulled just three and a half minutes into the game. San Jose scored two goals late in the third period of game four, the second one with just ten seconds left, to win the game 3–2. San Jose had a three-goal lead in game five and held off a Calgary comeback in a 4–3 victory. Miikka Kiprusoff recorded a shutout in game six to force a deciding game seven as the Flames won 2–0. After being held pointless in the first six games of the series San Jose forward Jeremy Roenick scored two goals and two assists in game seven as the Sharks won 5–3.

April 9	Calgary Flames	3–2	San Jose Sharks	HP Pavilion	Recap
Stephane Yelle (1) – 02:47; Dion Phaneuf (1) – pp – 05:17		First period	06:06 – Ryane Clowe (1)
Stephane Yelle (2) – 16:21		Second period	No scoring
No scoring		Third period	19:03 – Ryane Clowe (2)
Miikka Kiprusoff 37 saves / 39 shots		Goalie stats	Evgeni Nabokov 20 saves / 23 shots

April 10	Calgary Flames	0–2	San Jose Sharks	HP Pavilion	Recap
No scoring		First period	No scoring
No scoring		Second period	04:56 – Joe Pavelski (1); 18:09 – pp – Torrey Mitchell (1)
No scoring		Third period	No scoring
Miikka Kiprusoff 41 saves / 43 shots		Goalie stats	Evgeni Nabokov 21 saves / 21 shots

April 13	San Jose Sharks	3–4	Calgary Flames	Pengrowth Saddledome	Recap
Ryane Clowe (3) – pp – 01:31; Patrick Marleau (1) – 03:19; Douglas Murray (1) – 03:33		First period	13:22 – pp – Jarome Iginla (1)
No scoring		Second period	10:14 – pp – Daymond Langkow (1)
No scoring		Third period	01:18 – Dion Phaneuf (2); 16:15 – Owen Nolan (1)
Evgeni Nabokov 21 saves / 25 shots		Goalie stats	Miikka Kiprusoff 2 saves / 5 shots Curtis Joseph 22 saves / 22 shots

April 15	San Jose Sharks	3–2	Calgary Flames	Pengrowth Saddledome	Recap
No scoring		First period	03:19 – Jarome Iginla (2)
Ryane Clowe (4) – pp – 10:56		Second period	18:29 – Dion Phaneuf (3)
Jonathan Cheechoo (1) – 15:06; Joe Thornton (1) – 19:50		Third period	No scoring
Evgeni Nabokov 8 saves / 10 shots		Goalie stats	Miikka Kiprusoff 29 saves / 32 shots

April 17	Calgary Flames	3–4	San Jose Sharks	HP Pavilion	Recap
No scoring		First period	No scoring
Jarome Iginla (3) – pp – 04:03		Second period	11:32 – pp – Joe Pavelski (2); 18:07 – Patrick Marleau (2)
Daymond Langkow (2) – pp – 09:06; David Moss (1) – 18:43		Third period	04:52 – Jonathan Cheechoo (2); 08:22 – Jonathan Cheechoo (3)
Miikka Kiprusoff 22 saves / 26 shots		Goalie stats	Evgeni Nabokov 33 saves / 36 shots

April 20	San Jose Sharks	0–2	Calgary Flames	Pengrowth Saddledome	Recap
No scoring		First period	11:33 – Owen Nolan (2)
No scoring		Second period	19:03 – Daymond Langkow (3)
No scoring		Third period	No scoring
Evgeni Nabokov 23 saves / 25 shots		Goalie stats	Miikka Kiprusoff 21 saves / 21 shots

April 22	Calgary Flames	3–5	San Jose Sharks	HP Pavilion	Recap
Jarome Iginla (4) – pp – 12:23		First period	10:57 – pp – Joe Thornton (2)
Owen Nolan (3) – 03:33		Second period	06:04 – Jeremy Roenick (1); 09:04 – pp – Jeremy Roenick (2); 14:01 – Joe Pavelski (3); 14:53 – Devin Setoguchi (2)
Wayne Primeau (1) – 05:18		Third period	No scoring
Miikka Kiprusoff 26 saves / 30 shots Curtis Joseph 10 saves / 11 shots		Goalie stats	Evgeni Nabokov 19 saves / 22 shots

San Jose won series 4–3

==== (3) Minnesota Wild vs. (6) Colorado Avalanche ====
The Minnesota Wild entered the playoffs as the Northwest Division champions, earning the third seed in the Western Conference with 98 points. Colorado qualified as the sixth seed earning 95 points during the regular season. This was the second playoff meeting between these two teams, with Minnesota winning the only previous series. They last met in the 2003 Western Conference quarterfinals where Minnesota won in seven games. Minnesota won five of the eight games during this year's regular season series.

The Avalanche eliminated the Wild in six games. Colorado captain Joe Sakic added to his own league record in game one as he scored his eighth and final career playoff overtime goal in a 3–2 victory. The teams traded goals in the final two minutes of regulation in game two before Keith Carney ended the game 1:14 into the first overtime period, as the Wild evened the series with a 3–2 win. Pierre-Marc Bouchard scored the overtime winner in game three for Minnesota at 11:58 in the third consecutive overtime game of this series. Five different Colorado players scored in game four as the Avalanche forced Wild goaltender Niklas Backstrom from the game, winning 5–1. Colorado goaltender Jose Theodore made 38 saves in a 3–2 game five win. Theodore continued his strong play in game six as he made 34 saves from 35 shots against as Colorado closed out the series with a 2–1 victory.

April 9	Colorado Avalanche	3–2	OT	Minnesota Wild	Xcel Energy Center	Recap
No scoring		First period		No scoring
Kurt Sauer (1) – 01:29; Ryan Smyth (1) – pp – 13:08		Second period		No scoring
No scoring		Third period		03:02 – Mikko Koivu (1); 06:13 – Todd Fedoruk (1)
Joe Sakic (1) – 11:11		First overtime period		No scoring
Jose Theodore 28 saves / 30 shots		Goalie stats		Niklas Backstrom 19 saves / 22 shots

April 11	Colorado Avalanche	2–3	OT	Minnesota Wild	Xcel Energy Center	Recap
Peter Forsberg (1) – 17:06		First period		No scoring
No scoring		Second period		No scoring
Milan Hejduk (1) – pp – 19:16		Third period		01:37 – pp – Pavol Demitra (1); 18:09 – Mikko Koivu (2)
No scoring		First overtime period		01:14 – Keith Carney (1)
Jose Theodore 28 saves / 31 shots		Goalie stats		Niklas Backstrom 24 saves / 26 shots

April 14	Minnesota Wild	3–2	OT	Colorado Avalanche	Pepsi Center	Recap
No scoring		First period		15:19 – Andrew Brunette (1)
No scoring		Second period		No scoring
Mikko Koivu (3) – 07:13; Brian Rolston (1) – sh – 11:32		Third period		14:56 – Joe Sakic (2)
Pierre-Marc Bouchard (1) – 11:58		First overtime period		No scoring
Niklas Backstrom 44 saves / 46 shots		Goalie stats		Jose Theodore 36 saves / 39 shots

April 15	Minnesota Wild	1–5	Colorado Avalanche	Pepsi Center	Recap
No scoring		First period	04:01 – Andrew Brunette (2); 05:37 – Wojtek Wolski (1); 11:08 – Tyler Arnason (1)
No scoring		Second period	07:42 – pp – Ruslan Salei (1); 16:14 – pp – Milan Hejduk (2)
Mikko Koivu (4) – sh – 03:11		Third period	No scoring
Niklas Backstrom 24 saves / 29 shots Josh Harding 11 saves / 11 shots		Goalie stats	Jose Theodore 24 saves / 25 shots

April 17	Colorado Avalanche	3–2	Minnesota Wild	Xcel Energy Center	Recap
Andrew Brunette (3) – pp – 12:24		First period	19:20 – pp – Pierre-Marc Bouchard (2)
No scoring		Second period	No scoring
Wojtek Wolski (2) – pp – 05:06; Paul Stastny (1) – 06:25		Third period	19:57 – Brian Rolston (2)
Jose Theodore 38 saves / 40 shots		Goalie stats	Niklas Backstrom 14 saves / 17 shots

April 19	Minnesota Wild	1–2	Colorado Avalanche	Pepsi Center	Recap
No scoring		First period	08:02 – sh – Ben Guite (1)
Aaron Voros (1) – 00:36		Second period	12:20 – Ryan Smyth (2)
No scoring		Third period	No scoring
Niklas Backstrom 28 saves / 30 shots		Goalie stats	Jose Theodore 34 saves / 35 shots

Colorado won series 4–2

==== (4) Anaheim Ducks vs. (5) Dallas Stars ====
The Anaheim Ducks entered the playoffs as the fourth seed in the Western Conference with 102 points. Dallas qualified as the fifth seed earning 97 points during the regular season. This was the second playoff meeting between these two teams, with Anaheim winning the only previous series. They last met in the 2003 Western Conference semifinals where Anaheim won in six games. Dallas won five of the eight games during this year's regular season series.

The Stars defeated the Ducks in six games. Dallas took advantage of the undisciplined play of the Ducks in game one as they scored four goals on the power-play and Marty Turco made 23 saves in a 4–0 victory. The Stars broke open game two by scoring three times in the third period as they won 5–2. In game three the Ducks jumped out to an early 4–0 lead, Anaheim held on to win the game 4–2. Stars goaltender Marty Turco came eight seconds short of posting a shutout in game four as he made 28 saves in a 3–1 Dallas victory. The Ducks avoided elimination in game five as their special teams contributed two power-play goals in a 5–2 win. Corey Perry gave Anaheim a one-goal lead after two periods of play in game six before the Stars scored four unanswered goals in the third period and ended the series with a 4–1 victory.

April 10	Dallas Stars	4–0	Anaheim Ducks	Honda Center	Recap
Steve Ott (1) – pp – 11:25; Loui Eriksson (1) – pp – 17:34		First period	No scoring
Jere Lehtinen (1) – pp – 03:58; Brenden Morrow (1) – pp – 17:22		Second period	No scoring
No scoring		Third period	No scoring
Marty Turco 23 saves / 23 shots		Goalie stats	Jean-Sebastien Giguere 33 saves / 37 shots

April 12	Dallas Stars	5–2	Anaheim Ducks	Honda Center	Recap
Mike Ribeiro (1) – 06:28		First period	No scoring
Jere Lehtinen (2) – pp – 01:28		Second period	03:41 – pp – Teemu Selanne (1); 16:19 – Travis Moen (1)
Mike Modano (1) – pp – 05:47; Brad Richards (1) – 06:42; Loui Eriksson (2) – 14:36		Third period	No scoring
Marty Turco 20 saves / 22 shots		Goalie stats	Jean-Sebastien Giguere 25 saves / 30 shots

April 15	Anaheim Ducks	4–2	Dallas Stars	American Airlines Center	Recap
Todd Marchant (1) – 06:39; Ryan Getzlaf (1) – 10:09; Chris Pronger (1) – pp – 14:31		First period	No scoring
Chris Pronger (2) – pp – 05:34		Second period	No scoring
No scoring		Third period	05:43 – pp – Brenden Morrow (2); 07:22 – pp – Brenden Morrow (3)
Jean-Sebastien Giguere 31 saves / 33 shots		Goalie stats	Marty Turco 11 saves / 15 shots

April 17	Anaheim Ducks	1–3	Dallas Stars	American Airlines Center	Recap
No scoring		First period	16:39 – Joel Lundqvist (1)
No scoring		Second period	No scoring
Mathieu Schneider (1) – 19:52		Third period	09:01 – Stu Barnes (1); 17:17 – Steve Ott (2)
Jean-Sebastien Giguere 17 saves / 20 shots		Goalie stats	Marty Turco 28 saves / 29 shots

April 18	Dallas Stars	2–5	Anaheim Ducks	Honda Center	Recap
Mattias Norstrom (1) – 18:27		First period	08:25 – Corey Perry (1)
No scoring		Second period	11:03 – pp – Ryan Getzlaf (2)
Mike Ribeiro (2) – 04:41		Third period	00:48 – pp – Teemu Selanne (2); 12:05 – Sean O'Donnell (1); 18:36 – en – Todd Marchant (2)
Marty Turco 27 saves / 31 shots		Goalie stats	Jean-Sebastien Giguere 40 saves / 42 shots

April 20	Anaheim Ducks	1–4	Dallas Stars	American Airlines Center	Recap
No scoring		First period	No scoring
Corey Perry (2) – 02:11		Second period	No scoring
No scoring		Third period	01:18 – pp – Stephane Robidas (1); 02:10 – Stu Barnes (2); 17:42 – Loui Eriksson (3); 19:56 – pp-en – Mike Modano (2)
Jean-Sebastien Giguere 22 saves / 25 shots		Goalie stats	Marty Turco 17 saves / 18 shots

Dallas won series 4–2

== Conference semifinals ==
=== Eastern Conference semifinals ===
==== (1) Montreal Canadiens vs. (6) Philadelphia Flyers ====
This was the fifth playoff meeting between these two teams, with Montreal winning three of the four previous series. They last met in the 1989 Prince of Wales Conference Final where Montreal won in six games. Montreal swept this year's four game regular season series.

The Flyers eliminated the Canadiens in five games. Montreal fought back from a two-goal deficit early in game one as Alexei Kovalev forced overtime with his second goal of the game in the final minute of regulation time. In the first overtime period Canadiens forward Tom Kostopoulos scored the game-winner 48 seconds into the period, in a 4–3 Montreal victory. R. J. Umberger scored twice for the Flyers in game two as Philadelphia evened the series with a 4–2 win. Philadelphia scored three times in the second period of game three and hung on to win 3–2 despite allowing two power-play goals in the third period after Derian Hatcher was ejected from the game for boarding Francis Bouillon. Flyers goaltender Martin Biron made 36 saves as the Flyers won game four 4–2. Flyers forward Scottie Upshall broke the tie in game five as he scored the series-clinching goal with just over three minutes remaining in regulation time as Philadelphia earned a 6–4 victory.

April 24	Philadelphia Flyers	3–4	OT	Montreal Canadiens	Bell Centre	Recap
R. J. Umberger (2) – 13:15; Jim Dowd (1) – 16:49		First period		No scoring
No scoring		Second period		09:44 – Andrei Kostitsyn (4); 16:03 – sh – Alexei Kovalev (3)
Joffrey Lupul (2) – pp – 00:19		Third period		19:31 – pp – Alexei Kovalev (4)
No scoring		First overtime period		00:48 – Tom Kostopoulos (3)
Martin Biron 30 saves / 34 shots		Goalie stats		Carey Price 30 saves / 33 shots

April 26	Philadelphia Flyers	4–2	Montreal Canadiens	Bell Centre	Recap
R. J. Umberger (3) – 05:53; Jeff Carter (4) – pp – 08:39		First period	16:18 – pp – Saku Koivu (1)
Daniel Briere (7) – 13:33		Second period	No scoring
R. J. Umberger (4) – 17:39		Third period	01:26 – Andrei Markov (1)
Martin Biron 34 saves / 36 shots		Goalie stats	Carey Price 19 saves / 23 shots

April 28	Montreal Canadiens	2–3	Philadelphia Flyers	Wachovia Center	Recap
No scoring		First period	No scoring
No scoring		Second period	07:04 – Scottie Upshall (2); 15:12 – sh – Mike Richards (3); 18:19 – R. J. Umberger (5)
Tomas Plekanec (2) – pp – 07:29; Saku Koivu (2) – pp – 08:41		Third period	No scoring
Carey Price 9 saves / 12 shots Jaroslav Halak 2 saves / 2 shots		Goalie stats	Martin Biron 32 saves / 34 shots

April 30	Montreal Canadiens	2–4	Philadelphia Flyers	Wachovia Center	Recap
No scoring		First period	No scoring
No scoring		Second period	07:47 – pp – R. J. Umberger (6)
Tomas Plekanec (3) – 12:59; Saku Koivu (3) – 13:36		Third period	06:47 – Scott Hartnell (2); 16:22 – pp – Daniel Briere (8); 19:58 – en – R. J. Umberger (7)
Jaroslav Halak 22 saves / 25 shots		Goalie stats	Martin Biron 36 saves / 38 shots

May 3	Philadelphia Flyers	6–4	Montreal Canadiens	Bell Centre	Recap
R. J. Umberger (8) – 10:20		First period	04:29 – pp – Tomas Plekanec (4); 11:28 – Alexei Kovalev (5)
Mike Richards (4) – 14:02; R. J. Umberger (9) – 15:44; Scott Hartnell (3) – 17:00		Second period	08:15 – Chris Higgins (3)
Scottie Upshall (3) – 16:56; Mike Knuble (3) – en – 19:10		Third period	02:13 – Andrei Kostitsyn (5)
Martin Biron 31 saves / 35 shots		Goalie stats	Carey Price 31 saves / 36 shots

Philadelphia won series 4–1

==== (2) Pittsburgh Penguins vs. (5) New York Rangers ====
This was the fourth playoff meeting between these two teams, with Pittsburgh winning all three of the previous series. They last met in the 1996 Eastern Conference semifinals where Pittsburgh won in five games. New York won five of the eight games during this year's regular season series.

The Penguins defeated the Rangers in five games. The Penguins scored two goals 14 and 20 seconds apart in both the second and third periods of game one as they overcame a 3–0 deficit early in the second period. Evgeni Malkin scored a late power-play goal for the Penguins as they held on to win the game 5–4. Pittsburgh goaltender Marc-Andre Fleury made 26 saves to earn his second shutout of the playoffs in game two as the Penguins won 2–0. Evgeni Malkin's second power-play goal of the game scored late in the second period of game three held up as the game-winning goal as the Penguins won 5–3. Henrik Lundqvist made 29 saves in a shutout performance as the Rangers avoided elimination with a 3–0 victory in game four. The Rangers battled back to tie the game early in the third period of game five, however they came up short in overtime as Pittsburgh's Marian Hossa scored the series-winner at 7:10 of the first overtime period to win the series for the Penguins.

April 25	New York Rangers	4–5	Pittsburgh Penguins	Mellon Arena	Recap
Martin Straka (2) – pp – 13:40		First period	No scoring
Chris Drury (3) – 01:52; Sean Avery (4) – 03:37		Second period	08:13 – Jarkko Ruutu (2); 08:27 – Pascal Dupuis (1)
Scott Gomez (4) – 10:04		Third period	04:40 – Marian Hossa (2); 05:00 – Petr Sykora (4); 18:19 – pp – Evgeni Malkin (3)
Henrik Lundqvist 21 saves / 26 shots		Goalie stats	Marc-Andre Fleury 20 saves / 24 shots

April 27	New York Rangers	0–2	Pittsburgh Penguins	Mellon Arena	Recap
No scoring		First period	No scoring
No scoring		Second period	13:55 – pp – Jordan Staal (2)
No scoring		Third period	19:43 – en – Adam Hall (1)
Henrik Lundqvist 30 saves / 31 shots		Goalie stats	Marc-Andre Fleury 26 saves / 26 shots

April 29	Pittsburgh Penguins	5–3	New York Rangers	Madison Square Garden	Recap
Marian Hossa (3) – 01:02; Georges Laraque (1) – 16:17; Evgeni Malkin (4) – pp – 17:41		First period	14:32 – Martin Straka (3)
Evgeni Malkin (5) – pp – 17:53		Second period	12:07 – Ryan Callahan (2); 13:11 – Jaromir Jagr (3)
Ryan Malone (3) – 02:30		Third period	No scoring
Marc-Andre Fleury 36 saves / 39 shots		Goalie stats	Henrik Lundqvist 12 saves / 17 shots

May 1	Pittsburgh Penguins	0–3	New York Rangers	Madison Square Garden	Recap
No scoring		First period	No scoring
No scoring		Second period	12:45 – Jaromir Jagr (4)
No scoring		Third period	00:44 – pp – Brandon Dubinsky (4); 19:46 – pp-en – Jaromir Jagr (5)
Marc-Andre Fleury 20 saves / 22 shots		Goalie stats	Henrik Lundqvist 29 saves / 29 shots

May 4	New York Rangers	2–3	OT	Pittsburgh Penguins	Mellon Arena	Recap
No scoring		First period		No scoring
No scoring		Second period		08:45 – pp – Marian Hossa (4); 12:40 – Evgeni Malkin (6)
Lauri Korpikoski (1) – 02:03; Nigel Dawes (2) – 03:25		Third period		No scoring
No scoring		First overtime period		07:10 – Marian Hossa (5)
Henrik Lundqvist 37 saves / 40 shots		Goalie stats		Marc-Andre Fleury 20 saves / 22 shots

Pittsburgh won series 4–1

=== Western Conference semifinals ===
==== (1) Detroit Red Wings vs. (6) Colorado Avalanche ====
This was the sixth playoff meeting between these two teams, with Colorado winning three of the five previous series. They last met in the 2002 Western Conference Final where Detroit won in seven games. Detroit swept this year's four game regular season series.

The Red Wings swept the Avalanche in four games. Avalanche goaltender Jose Theodore was pulled early in the second period of game one after allowing four goals on 16 shots; the Red Wings held on to win 4–3. Detroit forward Johan Franzen's hat trick in game two helped the Red Wings to a 5–1 victory. Henrik Zetterberg's power-play goal just past the midway mark of the second period held up as the game-winner for Detroit in game three. After allowing the tying goal early in the first period of game four, the Red Wings scored the next seven goals and easily eliminated the Avalanche with an 8–2 win.

April 24	Colorado Avalanche	3–4	Detroit Red Wings	Joe Louis Arena	Recap
Paul Stastny (2) – 08:53		First period	09:46 – Henrik Zetterberg (3); 13:48 – Daniel Cleary (1); 17:23 – pp – Johan Franzen (3)
John-Michael Liles (1) – 05:17; Milan Hejduk (3) – 16:29		Second period	01:13 – Johan Franzen (4)
No scoring		Third period	No scoring
Jose Theodore 12 saves / 16 shots Peter Budaj 20 saves / 20 shots		Goalie stats	Chris Osgood 18 saves / 21 shots

April 26	Colorado Avalanche	1–5	Detroit Red Wings	Joe Louis Arena	Recap
No scoring		First period	04:22 – pp – Johan Franzen (5)
No scoring		Second period	04:04 – pp – Johan Franzen (6); 05:42 – Valtteri Filppula (2); 10:11 – Henrik Zetterberg (4)
Ian Laperriere (1) – 02:38		Third period	08:47 – sh – Johan Franzen (7)
Jose Theodore 16 saves / 20 shots Peter Budaj 19 saves / 20 shots		Goalie stats	Chris Osgood 19 saves / 20 shots

April 29	Detroit Red Wings	4–3	Colorado Avalanche	Pepsi Center	Recap
Pavel Datsyuk (4) – pp – 12:14; Johan Franzen (8) – 13:12		First period	05:17 – Cody McLeod (1)
Pavel Datsyuk (5) – 06:36; Henrik Zetterberg (5) – pp – 12:24		Second period	08:08 – pp – Andrew Brunette (4)
No scoring		Third period	05:19 – pp – Andrew Brunette (5)
Chris Osgood 30 saves / 33 shots		Goalie stats	Jose Theodore 31 saves / 35 shots

May 1	Detroit Red Wings	8–2	Colorado Avalanche	Pepsi Center	Recap
Mikael Samuelsson (1) – 04:33; Tomas Holmstrom (2) – 18:34; Johan Franzen (9) – 19:21		First period	06:51 – pp – Tyler Arnason (2)
Henrik Zetterberg (6) – pp – 02:15; Henrik Zetterberg (7) – 05:45; Johan Franzen (10) – sh – 11:37; Johan Franzen (11) – pp – 17:15		Second period	No scoring
Mikael Samuelsson (2) – 08:02		Third period	10:26 – pp – John-Michael Liles (2)
Chris Osgood 29 saves / 31 shots		Goalie stats	Jose Theodore 12 saves / 15 shots Peter Budaj 20 saves / 25 shots

Detroit won series 4–0

==== (2) San Jose Sharks vs. (5) Dallas Stars ====
This was the third playoff meeting between these two teams, with Dallas winning both of the previous series. They last met in the 2000 Western Conference semifinals where Dallas won in five games. Dallas won this year's eight-game regular season series earning ten of sixteen points.

The Stars held on to defeat the Sharks in six games. Jonathan Cheechoo tied game one late in the third period for San Jose, but Dallas captain Brenden Morrow scored 4:39 into the first overtime to give Dallas a 3–2 victory. Dallas forward Brad Richards keyed a four-goal outburst in the third period of game two by scoring a goal and three assists to lead the Stars to a 5–2 win. In game three the Stars overcame a one-goal deficit in the third period as they won in the first overtime on a goal from defenceman Mattias Norstrom at 4:37. Milan Michalek broke the tie for San Jose in game four with his power-play goal at 3:26 of the third period as the Sharks avoided elimination with a 2–1 victory. Dallas took a two-goal lead into the third period of game five, however the Sharks tied the game with goals by Milan Michalek and Brian Campbell. Overtime was needed for the third time in five games and just 1:05 into the first overtime San Jose forward Joe Pavelski converted on a turnover to keep the Sharks alive with a 3–2 win. After trading goals in regulation time, game six became the eighth-longest game in NHL history (now the tenth-longest game, as of 2024) as Brenden Morrow tipped home a pass on the power-play from defenceman Stephane Robidas to end the game 9:03 into the fourth overtime period and win the series for the Stars 4–2.

April 25	Dallas Stars	3–2	OT	San Jose Sharks	HP Pavilion	Recap
No scoring		First period		No scoring
Mike Modano (3) – pp – 06:06; Brenden Morrow (4) – 09:09		Second period		04:50 – Milan Michalek (1)
No scoring		Third period		16:58 – Jonathan Cheechoo (4)
Brenden Morrow (5) – 04:39		First overtime period		No scoring
Marty Turco 25 saves / 27 shots		Goalie stats		Evgeni Nabokov 15 saves / 18 shots

April 27	Dallas Stars	5–2	San Jose Sharks	HP Pavilion	Recap
Mike Ribeiro (3) – 15:37		First period	10:13 – pp – Joe Pavelski (4)
No scoring		Second period	14:54 – Milan Michalek (2)
Brad Richards (2) – 00:32; Mike Modano (4) – pp – 03:39; Niklas Hagman (1) – 13:55; Niklas Hagman (2) – en – 18:45		Third period	No scoring
Marty Turco 29 saves / 31 shots		Goalie stats	Evgeni Nabokov 21 saves / 25 shots

April 29	San Jose Sharks	1–2	OT	Dallas Stars	American Airlines Center	Recap
Patrick Marleau (3) – sh – 19:25		First period		No scoring
No scoring		Second period		No scoring
No scoring		Third period		00:47 – pp – Sergei Zubov (1)
No scoring		First overtime period		04:37 – Mattias Norstrom (2)
Evgeni Nabokov 27 saves / 29 shots		Goalie stats		Marty Turco 19 saves / 20 shots

April 30	San Jose Sharks	2–1	Dallas Stars	American Airlines Center	Recap
No scoring		First period	No scoring
Patrick Marleau (4) – sh – 09:19		Second period	05:25 – Jere Lehtinen (3)
Milan Michalek (3) – pp – 03:26		Third period	No scoring
Evgeni Nabokov 17 saves / 18 shots		Goalie stats	Marty Turco 22 saves / 24 shots

May 2	Dallas Stars	2–3	OT	San Jose Sharks	HP Pavilion	Recap
No scoring		First period		No scoring
Jere Lehtinen (4) – pp – 06:14; Brenden Morrow (6) – 19:04		Second period		No scoring
No scoring		Third period		06:20 – Milan Michalek (4); 11:07 – Brian Campbell (1)
No scoring		First overtime period		01:05 – Joe Pavelski (5)
Marty Turco 19 saves / 22 shots		Goalie stats		Evgeni Nabokov 24 saves / 26 shots

May 4	San Jose Sharks	1–2	4OT	Dallas Stars	American Airlines Center	Recap
No scoring		First period		No scoring
No scoring		Second period		04:49 – Antti Miettinen (1)
Ryan Clowe (5) – 01:39		Third period		No scoring
No scoring		Fourth overtime period		09:03 – pp – Brenden Morrow (7)
Evgeni Nabokov 53 saves / 55 shots		Goalie stats		Marty Turco 61 saves / 62 shots

Dallas won series 4–2

== Conference finals ==
=== Eastern Conference final ===
==== (2) Pittsburgh Penguins vs. (6) Philadelphia Flyers ====
This was the fourth playoff meeting between these two teams, with Philadelphia winning all three of the previous series. They last met in the 2000 Eastern Conference semifinals where Philadelphia won in six games. Pittsburgh most recently made it to the conference finals in 2001, when they lost to the New Jersey Devils in five games. Philadelphia last made the conference finals in 2004, where they lost in seven games to the Tampa Bay Lightning. Philadelphia won five of the eight games during this year's regular season series.

The Penguins eliminated their cross-state rivals the Flyers in five games. Evgeni Malkin's seventh goal of the playoffs held up as the game-winner for Pittsburgh in game one as the Penguins earned a 4–2 win. Pittsburgh forward Maxime Talbot broke the tie in game two just before the midway mark of the third period and Jordan Staal added an empty-net goal for the Penguins to give them their second consecutive 4–2 victory. Marian Hossa scored twice in game three for the Penguins as they won the game 4–1 to take a commanding 3–0 series lead. The Flyers jumped out to a 3–0 lead in the first period of game four and held on to win the game 4–2. Marian Hossa recorded four points for Pittsburgh in game five as the Penguins won their eighth consecutive home game to advance to the Stanley Cup Final by a decisive final score of 6–0.

May 9	Philadelphia Flyers	2–4	Pittsburgh Penguins	Mellon Arena	Recap
Mike Richards (5) – 08:30; Mike Richards (6) – 12:50		First period	06:19 – Petr Sykora (5); 14:11 – Sidney Crosby (3); 19:53 – Evgeni Malkin (7)
No scoring		Second period	04:50 – sh – Evgeni Malkin (8)
No scoring		Third period	No scoring
Martin Biron 17 saves / 21 shots		Goalie stats	Marc-Andre Fleury 26 saves / 28 shots

May 11	Philadelphia Flyers	2–4	Pittsburgh Penguins	Mellon Arena	Recap
No scoring		First period	10:48 – pp – Sidney Crosby (4)
Jeff Carter (5) – pp – 05:46; Mike Richards (7) – sh – 19:36		Second period	13:43 – pp – Marian Hossa (6)
No scoring		Third period	08:51 – Maxime Talbot (2); 19:31 – en – Jordan Staal (3)
Martin Biron 34 saves / 37 shots		Goalie stats	Marc-Andre Fleury 30 saves / 32 shots

May 13	Pittsburgh Penguins	4–1	Philadelphia Flyers	Wachovia Center	Recap
Ryan Whitney (1) – pp – 05:03; Marian Hossa (7) – 07:41		First period	10:59 – R. J. Umberger (10)
No scoring		Second period	No scoring
Ryan Malone (4) – 09:58; Marian Hossa (8) – en – 19:06		Third period	No scoring
Marc-Andre Fleury 17 saves / 18 shots		Goalie stats	Martin Biron 21 saves / 24 shots

May 15	Pittsburgh Penguins	2–4	Philadelphia Flyers	Wachovia Center	Recap
No scoring		First period	08:27 – Joffrey Lupul (3); 11:48 – pp – Daniel Briere (9); 18:50 – pp – Jeff Carter (6)
No scoring		Second period	No scoring
Jordan Staal (4) – 03:16; Jordan Staal (5) – 14:11		Third period	19:27 – en – Joffrey Lupul (4)
Marc-Andre Fleury 30 saves / 33 shots		Goalie stats	Martin Biron 36 saves / 38 shots

May 18	Philadelphia Flyers	0–6	Pittsburgh Penguins	Mellon Arena	Recap
No scoring		First period	02:30 – pp – Ryan Malone (5); 09:50 – Evgeni Malkin (9)
No scoring		Second period	08:24 – Marian Hossa (9); 11:42 – pp – Ryan Malone (6); 19:02 – Jordan Staal (6)
No scoring		Third period	04:03 – Pascal Dupuis (2)
Martin Biron 19 saves / 25 shots		Goalie stats	Marc-Andre Fleury 21 saves / 21 shots

Pittsburgh won series 4–1

=== Western Conference final ===
==== (1) Detroit Red Wings vs. (5) Dallas Stars ====
This was the fourth playoff meeting between these two teams, with Detroit winning all three of the previous series. They last met in the 1998 Western Conference Final where Detroit won in six games. This was Detroit's second consecutive Conference finals appearance; they lost to the Anaheim Ducks in six games in the previous year. Dallas last made the conference finals in 2000, where they defeated the Colorado Avalanche in seven games. Detroit won three of the four games during this year's regular season series.

The Red Wings defeated the Stars in six games. Detroit scored three power-play goals as they took game one 4–1. Red Wings' goaltender Chris Osgood made 17 saves in game two to give Detroit a 2–1 win. Stars' forward Mike Ribeiro was assessed a match penalty at the end of game two for retaliating to an earlier stick infraction with a two-handed slash to Chris Osgood's chest; neither players were suspended. Detroit forward Pavel Datsyuk scored a hat-trick in game three for the Red Wings; while Osgood stopped 16 shots for the 5–2 win. Marty Turco made 33 saves as the Stars avoided elimination in game four winning 3–1. Turco continued his strong play for Dallas in game five as he stopped 38 shots in a 2–1 victory. The Red Wings used the strength of a three-goal first period in game six to eliminate the Stars and return to the Stanley Cup Final for the first time since 2002.

May 8	Dallas Stars	1–4	Detroit Red Wings	Joe Louis Arena	Recap
No scoring		First period	04:28 – pp – Brian Rafalski (2); 15:34 – pp – Johan Franzen (12)
Brenden Morrow (8) – 18:53		Second period	06:40 – pp – Tomas Holmstrom (3); 15:37 – Valtteri Filppula (3)
No scoring		Third period	No scoring
Marty Turco 27 saves / 31 shots		Goalie stats	Chris Osgood 20 saves / 21 shots

May 10	Dallas Stars	1–2	Detroit Red Wings	Joe Louis Arena	Recap
Stephane Robidas (2) – pp– 10:41		First period	05:56 – Darren Helm (1); 15:13 – pp – Henrik Zetterberg (8)
No scoring		Second period	No scoring
No scoring		Third period	No scoring
Marty Turco 32 saves / 34 shots		Goalie stats	Chris Osgood 17 saves / 18 shots

May 12	Detroit Red Wings	5–2	Dallas Stars	American Airlines Center	Recap
Pavel Datsyuk (6) – 09:27; Pavel Datsyuk (7) – 15:50		First period	15:13 – Nicklas Grossmann (1)
Jiri Hudler (3) – 11:54		Second period	03:47 – Brad Richards (3)
Henrik Zetterberg (9) – sh – 01:38; Pavel Datsyuk (8) – 17:19		Third period	No scoring
Chris Osgood 16 saves / 18 shots		Goalie stats	Marty Turco 16 saves / 21 shots

May 14	Detroit Red Wings	1–3	Dallas Stars	American Airlines Center	Recap
No scoring		First period	No scoring
No scoring		Second period	19:37 – Loui Eriksson (4)
Henrik Zetterberg (10) – 00:49		Third period	05:35 – pp – Mike Modano (5); 14:34 – Brenden Morrow (9)
Chris Osgood 19 saves / 22 shots		Goalie stats	Marty Turco 33 saves / 34 shots

May 17	Dallas Stars	2–1	Detroit Red Wings	Joe Louis Arena	Recap
Trevor Daley (1) – 09:21		First period	15:30 – pp – Jiri Hudler (4)
Joel Lundqvist (2) – 06:04		Second period	No scoring
No scoring		Third period	No scoring
Marty Turco 38 saves / 39 shots		Goalie stats	Chris Osgood 19 saves / 21 shots

May 19	Detroit Red Wings	4–1	Dallas Stars	American Airlines Center	Recap
Kris Draper (3) – 03:45; Pavel Datsyuk (9) – pp – 11:41; Dallas Drake (1) – 16:17		First period	No scoring
Henrik Zetterberg (11) – sh – 03:11		Second period	No scoring
No scoring		Third period	02:27 – pp – Stephane Robidas (3)
Chris Osgood 28 saves / 29 shots		Goalie stats	Marty Turco 25 saves / 29 shots

Detroit won series 4–2

== Stanley Cup Finals ==
This was the first playoff meeting between these two teams. Both teams won their last appearance in the Final; Detroit defeated Carolina in five games in 2002, while Pittsburgh swept Chicago in four games in 1992. The teams did not play each other during this year's regular season.

May 24	Pittsburgh Penguins	0–4	Detroit Red Wings	Joe Louis Arena	Recap
No scoring		First period	No scoring
No scoring		Second period	13:01 – Mikael Samuelsson (3)
No scoring		Third period	02:16 – Mikael Samuelsson (4); 17:18 – sh – Daniel Cleary (2); 19:47 – pp – Henrik Zetterberg (12)
Marc-Andre Fleury 32 saves / 36 shots		Goalie stats	Chris Osgood 19 saves / 19 shots

May 26	Pittsburgh Penguins	0–3	Detroit Red Wings	Joe Louis Arena	Recap
No scoring		First period	06:55 – Brad Stuart (1); 11:18 – Tomas Holmstrom (4)
No scoring		Second period	No scoring
No scoring		Third period	08:48 – Valtteri Filppula (4)
Marc-Andre Fleury 31 saves / 34 shots		Goalie stats	Chris Osgood 22 saves / 22 shots

May 28	Detroit Red Wings	2–3	Pittsburgh Penguins	Mellon Arena	Recap
No scoring		First period	17:25 – Sidney Crosby (5)
Johan Franzen (13) – pp – 14:48		Second period	02:34 – pp – Sidney Crosby (6)
Mikael Samuelsson (5) – 13:37		Third period	07:18 – Adam Hall (2)
Chris Osgood 21 saves / 24 shots		Goalie stats	Marc-Andre Fleury 32 saves / 34 shots

May 31	Detroit Red Wings	2–1	Pittsburgh Penguins	Mellon Arena	Recap
Nicklas Lidstrom (3) – 07:06		First period	02:51 – pp – Marian Hossa (10)
No scoring		Second period	No scoring
Jiri Hudler (5) – 02:26		Third period	No scoring
Chris Osgood 22 saves / 23 shots		Goalie stats	Marc-Andre Fleury 28 saves / 30 shots

June 2	Pittsburgh Penguins	4–3	3OT	Detroit Red Wings	Joe Louis Arena	Recap
Marian Hossa (11) – 08:37; Adam Hall (3) – 14:41		First period		No scoring
No scoring		Second period		02:54 – Darren Helm (2)
Maxime Talbot (3) – 19:25		Third period		06:43 – pp – Pavel Datsyuk (10); 09:23 – Brian Rafalski (3)
Petr Sykora (6) – pp – 09:57		Third overtime period		No scoring
Marc-Andre Fleury 55 saves / 58 shots		Goalie stats		Chris Osgood 28 saves / 32 shots

June 4	Detroit Red Wings	3–2	Pittsburgh Penguins	Mellon Arena	Recap
Brian Rafalski (4) – pp – 05:03		First period	No scoring
Valtteri Filppula (5) – 08:07		Second period	15:26 – pp – Evgeni Malkin (10)
Henrik Zetterberg (13) – 07:36		Third period	18:33 – pp – Marian Hossa (12)
Chris Osgood 20 saves / 22 shots		Goalie stats	Marc-Andre Fleury 27 saves / 30 shots

Detroit won series 4–2

== Player statistics ==
=== Skaters ===
These are the top ten skaters based on points. If the list exceeds ten skaters because of a tie in points, all of the tied skaters are shown.

Player	Team	GP	G	A	Pts	+/–	PIM
Henrik Zetterberg	Detroit Red Wings	22	13	14	27	+16	16
Sidney Crosby	Pittsburgh Penguins	20	6	21	27	+7	12
Marian Hossa	Pittsburgh Penguins	20	12	14	26	+8	12
Pavel Datsyuk	Detroit Red Wings	22	10	13	23	+13	6
Evgeni Malkin	Pittsburgh Penguins	20	10	12	22	+3	24
Johan Franzen	Detroit Red Wings	16	13	5	18	+13	14
Mike Ribeiro	Dallas Stars	18	3	14	17	0	16
Daniel Briere	Philadelphia Flyers	17	9	7	16	-3	20
Ryan Malone	Pittsburgh Penguins	20	6	10	16	+4	25
R. J. Umberger	Philadelphia Flyers	17	10	5	15	+7	10
Brenden Morrow	Dallas Stars	18	9	6	15	0	22
Jaromir Jagr	New York Rangers	10	5	10	15	+3	12
Brad Richards	Dallas Stars	18	3	12	15	+1	8
Niklas Kronwall	Detroit Red Wings	22	0	15	15	+16	18

GP = Games played; G = Goals; A = Assists; Pts = Points; +/– = Plus/minus; PIM = Penalty minutes

=== Goaltending ===
This is a combined table of the top five goaltenders based on goals against average and the top five goaltenders based on save percentage with at least 420 minutes played. The table is sorted by GAA, and the criteria for inclusion is bolded.

Player	Team	GP	W	L	SA	GA	GAA	Sv%	SO	TOI
Chris Osgood	Detroit Red Wings	19	14	4	430	30	**1.55**	**.930**	3	1159:57
Marc-Andre Fleury	Pittsburgh Penguins	20	14	6	610	41	**1.97**	**.933**	3	1251:10
Marty Turco	Dallas Stars	18	10	8	511	40	**2.08**	**.922**	1	1152:13
Evgeni Nabokov	San Jose Sharks	13	6	7	333	31	**2.18**	.907	1	852:52
Henrik Lundqvist	New York Rangers	10	5	5	287	26	**2.57**	**.909**	1	608:04
Tim Thomas	Boston Bruins	7	3	4	221	19	2.65	**.914**	0	430:06

GP = Games played; W = Wins; L = Losses; SA = Shots against; GA = Goals against; GAA = Goals against average; Sv% = Save percentage; SO = Shutouts; TOI = Time On Ice (minutes:seconds)

== Television ==
National Canadian English-language coverage of the playoffs were split between the CBC and TSN, with the CBC holding exclusive rights to the Stanley Cup Final. French-language telecasts were broadcast on RDS and RDS2. This marked the last season that all playoff games involving Canadian teams had to air on the CBC instead of TSN, even if it mean they had to be broadcast regionally. Under new contracts that would take effect in 2009, the CBC and TSN would begin to select the rights to individual series using a draft-like setup, regardless if they involved Canadian teams.

In the United States, coverage was split between NBC and Versus. During the first three rounds, NBC primarily televised weekend afternoon games and Versus aired evening games. During the first and second round, excluding games exclusively broadcast on NBC, the regional rights holders of each participating U.S. team produced local telecasts of their respective games. Not all first and second-round games were nationally televised, while the conference finals were exclusively broadcast on either NBC or Versus. Versus then aired games one and two of the Stanley Cup Final while NBC televised the remainder of the series.

== See also ==
- 2007–08 NHL season
- List of NHL seasons

Preceded by 2007 Stanley Cup playoffs	Stanley Cup playoffs 2008	Succeeded by 2009 Stanley Cup playoffs
