= Ryane Clowe =

Former Canadian ice hockey player (born 1982)

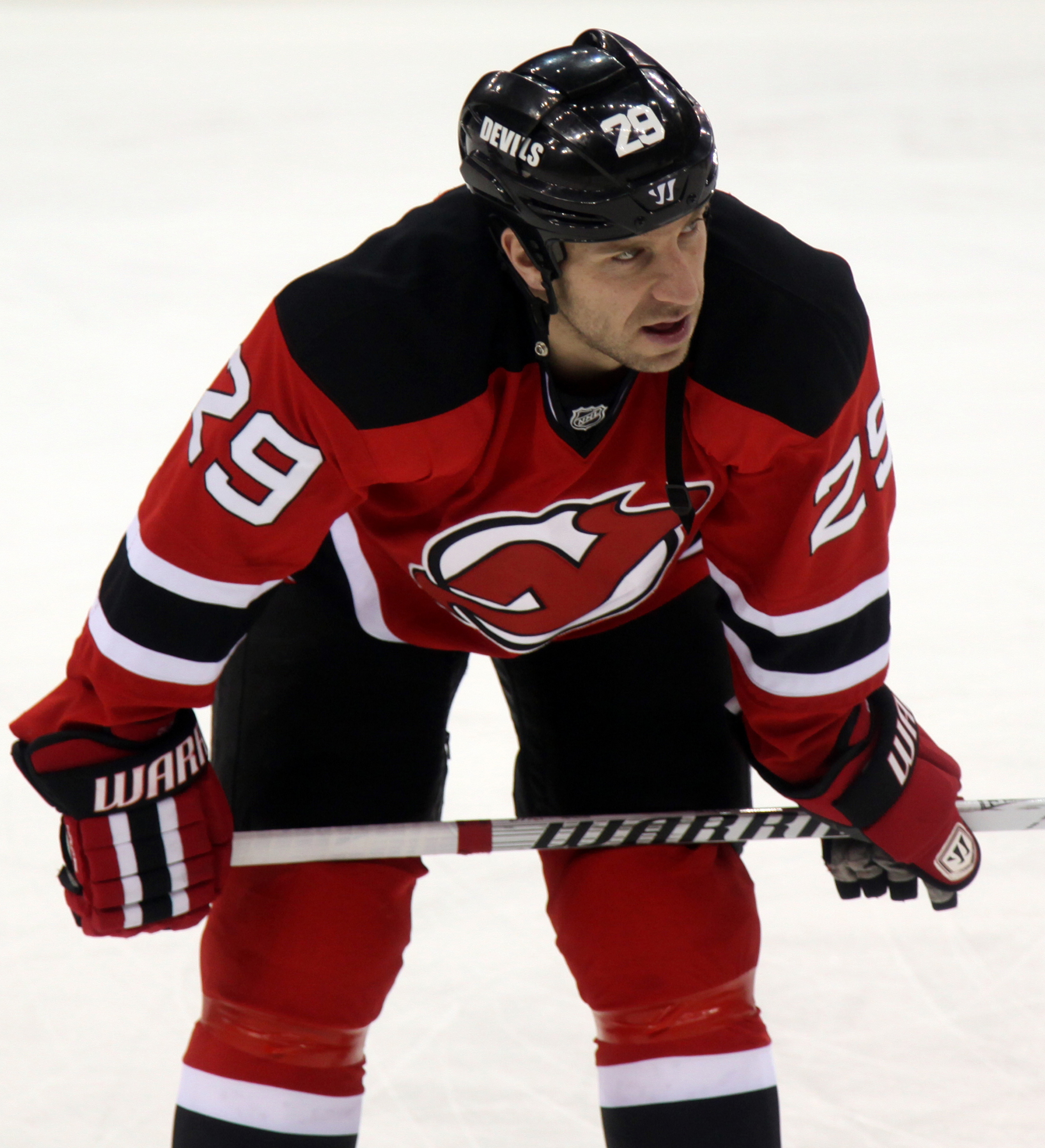
- Clowe with the New Jersey Devils in January 2014
- Born: September 30, 1982 (age 44) Fermeuse, Newfoundland, Canada
- Height: 6 ft 3 in (191 cm)
- Weight: 225 lb (102 kg; 16 st 1 lb)
- Position: Left wing
- Shot: Left
- Played for: San Jose Sharks; New York Rangers; New Jersey Devils
- NHL draft: 175th overall, 2001; San Jose Sharks
- Playing career: 2003–2015

Ryane Clowe (born September 30, 1982) is a Canadian former professional ice hockey left winger who played in the National Hockey League (NHL) with the San Jose Sharks, New York Rangers and New Jersey Devils. He was drafted into the NHL by the San Jose Sharks in the sixth round, 175th overall, at the 2001 NHL entry draft. In 2018, he was named the head coach of the ECHL's Newfoundland Growlers, a position he resigned from in January 2019. He was a hockey advisor for the New York Rangers from 2021-22 to the 2023-24 season. On July 3, 2024 Clowe was named assistant general manager of the San Jose Sharks.Ryane Clowe resigned as San Jose Sharks assistant general manager on September 7, 2025, after just one season, citing family reasons. The 42-year-old immediately rejoined the New York Rangers as an assistant general manager on September 8, 2025, returning to the East Coast.

== Playing career ==
=== Professional ===
Having been drafted by the NHL's San Jose Sharks in the sixth round, 177th overall, of the 2001 NHL entry draft, Clowe played two full seasons with the Cleveland Barons, San Jose's American Hockey League (AHL) affiliate, and was named team MVP in 2004–05, before splitting time between the Barons and the Sharks in 2005–06.

Clowe appeared in 18 games with the Sharks in the 2005–06 season. In the subsequent off-season, he signed a new three-year contract worth $1.625 million; the contract was a two-way deal for two of its first three years.

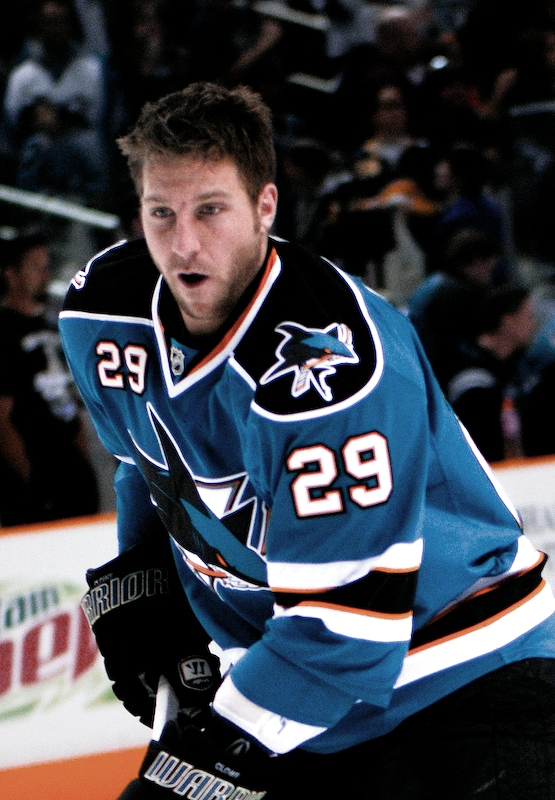
Clowe in 2008 as a member of the San Jose Sharks

Approximately halfway through the first season of the contract, in 2006–07, Clowe was given an opportunity to play on the Sharks' first line and power play unit alongside Patrick Marleau and Joe Thornton, where he responded with a career-high 34 points in 58 games. He scored his first career NHL hat-trick on January 6, 2007, in a game against the Columbus Blue Jackets. In the 2007 Stanley Cup playoffs, he scored his first playoff goal on April 13 in the Western Conference Quarterfinals series against the Nashville Predators. Securing his roster spot on the Sharks, he became known for his hard-checking game and willingness to fight when needed.

Clowe played 11 games for the Sharks in 2007–08, then went on injured reserve on October 28, 2007, due to torn knee ligaments. He returned to the lineup on March 30, 2008, in time for the 2008 playoffs, during which he recorded 9 points in 13 games, which was second-best on the team behind only Joe Thornton.

On July 6, 2009, Clowe signed a new four-year contract that paid him $3.5 million in each of his first three years and $4 million in his final year.

On May 8, 2011, in game five of the second round of the 2011 playoffs against the Detroit Red Wings, Clowe suffered a separated shoulder as a result of a hit from Red Wings’ defenceman Niklas Kronwall. This injury resulted in Clowe missing Game 6 of the series before returning to the lineup for Game 7. After the Sharks defeated the Red Wings in the second round for the second consecutive year this time in seven games, Clowe and the Sharks would go on to lose in the Western Conference Finals for the second consecutive year, this time in five games to the Presidents’ Trophy-winning Vancouver Canucks. Despite his injured shoulder, Clowe played in all five games of the series. He ended the playoffs with six goals and nine assists for 15 points in 17 games.

On April 5, 2012, Clowe reached out from the bench with his stick to illegally interfere with Los Angeles Kings centreman Jarret Stoll. The Sharks went on to win the game 6–5 in a shootout. Although review deemed the move illegal, there was no supplemental discipline by the NHL.

On November 6, 2012, during the 2012–13 NHL lockout, Clowe signed with the San Francisco Bulls of the ECHL.

On February 22, 2013, during a game against the Chicago Blackhawks, Clowe left the bench to start a fight with Blackhawks forward Andrew Shaw. Clowe was assessed a minor penalty for roughing and a game misconduct for leaving the bench on an illegal line change to start a fight. The Sharks lost the game 2–1. After supplemental review, Clowe was given a two-game suspension by the NHL.

On April 2, 2013, Clowe, with his contract set to expire at the end of the 2012–13 season, was traded to the New York Rangers in exchange for a second- and a third-round pick in 2013, as well as a conditional second-round pick in 2014. (The conditional pick was to become a fifth-round pick should Clowe not resign with New York, or should New York fail to win two playoff rounds; both conditions were satisfied and the pick became a fifth-rounder.)

On July 5, 2013, as an unrestricted free agent, Clowe signed a five-year, $24.25 million contract with the New Jersey Devils.

On September 12, 2015, Clowe retired from the NHL after team doctors refused to clear him to return to the ice following a concussion initially sustained in a November 6, 2014, game against the St. Louis Blues.

== Coaching career ==
On July 12, 2016, Clowe was named the assistant coach of his former team, the New Jersey Devils. After two seasons as an assistant, he was hired as a head coach by the Newfoundland Growlers, an expansion team in the ECHL, for the 2018–19 season. He stepped down as head coach in January 2019 due to continuing health issues related to his concussion history. He'd already missed several games in November due to health concerns.

== Career statistics ==
			Regular season					Playoffs
Season	Team	League	GP	G	A	Pts	PIM	GP	G	A	Pts	PIM
1999–2000	St. John’s Maple Leafs AAA	NLMHL
2000–01	Moncton Beavers	MHL	30	21	22	43	0	—	—	—	—	—
2000–01	Rimouski Océanic	QMJHL	32	15	10	25	43	11	8	1	9	12
2001–02	Rimouski Océanic	QMJHL	53	28	45	73	120	7	1	6	7	2
2002–03	Rimouski Océanic	QMJHL	17	8	19	27	44	—	—	—	—	—
2002–03	Montreal Rocket	QMJHL	43	18	30	48	60	7	3	7	10	6
2003–04	Cleveland Barons	AHL	72	11	29	40	97	8	3	1	4	9
2004–05	Cleveland Barons	AHL	74	27	35	62	101	—	—	—	—	—
2005–06	Cleveland Barons	AHL	35	13	21	34	35	—	—	—	—	—
2005–06	San Jose Sharks	NHL	18	0	2	2	9	1	0	0	0	0
2006–07	San Jose Sharks	NHL	58	16	18	34	78	11	4	2	6	17
2007–08	San Jose Sharks	NHL	15	3	5	8	22	13	5	4	9	12
2008–09	San Jose Sharks	NHL	71	22	30	52	51	6	1	1	2	8
2009–10	San Jose Sharks	NHL	82	19	38	57	131	15	2	8	10	28
2010–11	San Jose Sharks	NHL	75	24	38	62	100	17	6	9	15	32
2011–12	San Jose Sharks	NHL	76	17	28	45	97	5	0	3	3	0
2012–13	San Jose Sharks	NHL	28	0	11	11	79	—	—	—	—	—
2012–13	New York Rangers	NHL	12	3	5	8	14	2	0	1	1	0
2013–14	New Jersey Devils	NHL	43	7	19	26	33	—	—	—	—	—
2014–15	New Jersey Devils	NHL	13	1	3	4	4	—	—	—	—	—
NHL totals			491	112	197	309	618	70	18	28	46	97
