= Sean Avery =

Canadian ice hockey player (born 1980)

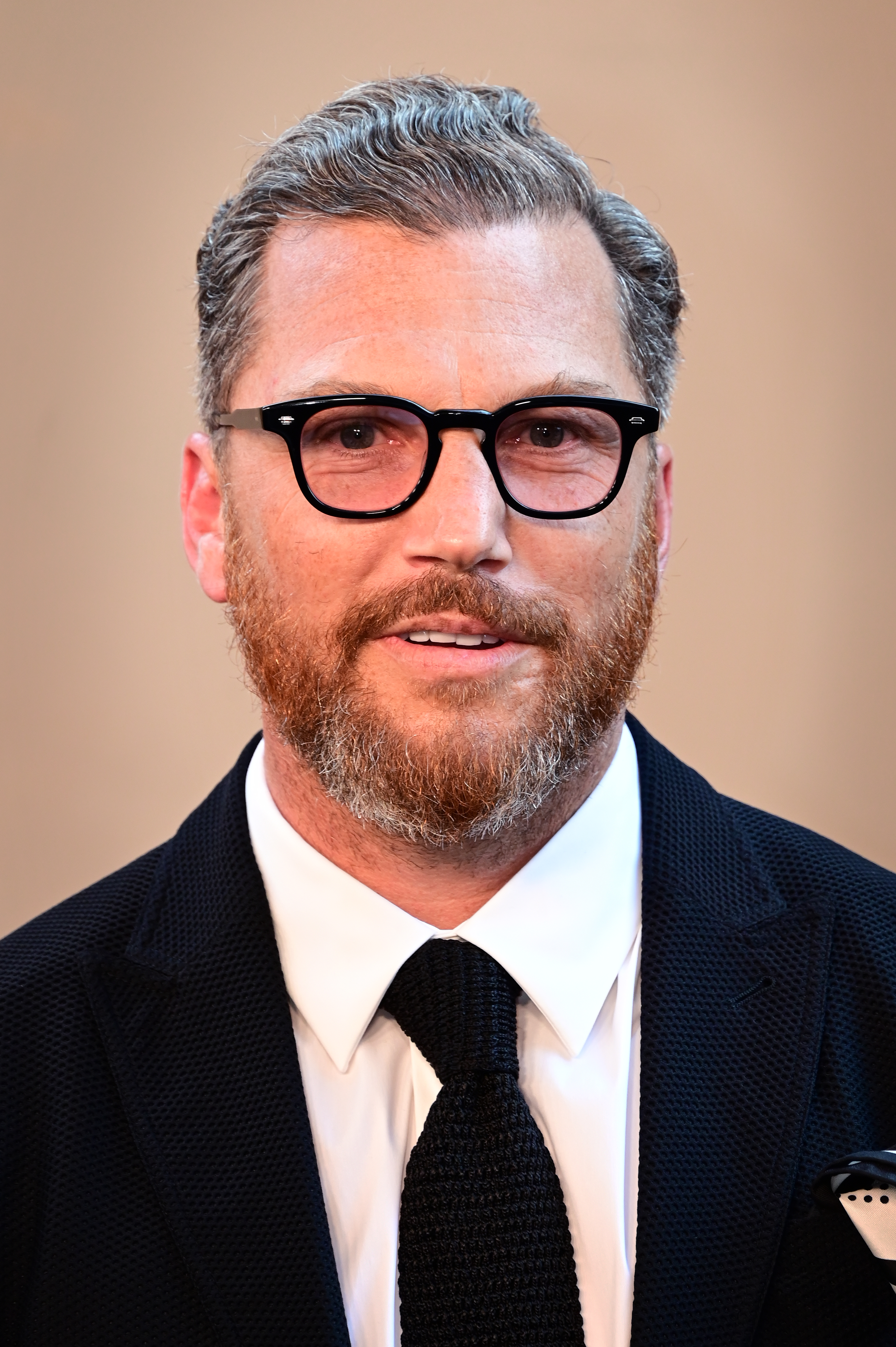
- Avery in 2026
- Born: April 10, 1980 (age 46) North York, Ontario, Canada
- Height: 5 ft 10 in (178 cm)
- Weight: 195 lb (88 kg; 13 st 13 lb)
- Position: Left wing
- Shot: Left
- Played for: Detroit Red Wings; Los Angeles Kings; Lahti Pelicans; New York Rangers; Dallas Stars
- NHL draft: Undrafted
- Playing career: 2000–2012

Sean Christopher Avery (born April 10, 1980) is a Canadian-American former professional ice hockey player and actor. During his career in the National Hockey League (NHL), he played left wing for the Detroit Red Wings, Los Angeles Kings, New York Rangers, and Dallas Stars, gaining recognition for controversial and disrespectful behaviour both on and off the ice. His agitating playing style led to multiple teams waiving him and to having a contract terminated. He led the league in penalty minutes twice, during the 2003–04 and 2005–06 NHL seasons.

After retiring in 2012, Avery focused full-time on working in the creative industry. He has worked in fashion as an intern at Vogue magazine, as a model, as an actor, and as a restaurateur. Avery's memoir, Ice Capades: A Memoir of Fast Living and Tough Hockey, was published by Blue Rider Press in 2017. He hosted a weekly podcast, No Gruffs Given with Sean Avery from December 2019 to 2022. Avery's acting roles include as Bob Dill in The Rocket (2005), and would make appearances in several Christopher Nolan films including Tenet (2020), Oppenheimer (2023), and The Odyssey (2026).

== Early life ==
Avery was born in North York, Ontario, the son of Al and Marlene Avery, both teachers. He grew up in Pickering, Ontario, where he attended Dunbarton High School. He has a younger brother named Scott.

== Playing career ==
=== Junior league (1996–2000) ===
Prior to joining the NHL, Avery played for the Owen Sound Platers and the Kingston Frontenacs of the Ontario Hockey League (OHL).

=== Detroit Red Wings (2001–2003) ===
Avery was signed by the Detroit Red Wings as a free agent in 1999. He played one final season in the OHL before turning professional in 2000 with the Cincinnati Mighty Ducks of the American Hockey League (AHL). Avery first played in the NHL during the 2001–02 season, playing 36 games with the Red Wings and 36 in the minors. The Red Wings went on to win the Stanley Cup that season but Avery did not play in the playoffs nor did he play the required 41 games to get his name engraved on the Cup.

Midway through the 2002–03 season, Avery was traded to the Los Angeles Kings, along with defenseman Maxim Kuznetsov and two draft picks for Mathieu Schneider. He finished the season with 15 points in 51 games.

=== Los Angeles Kings and NHL lockout (2003–2007) ===
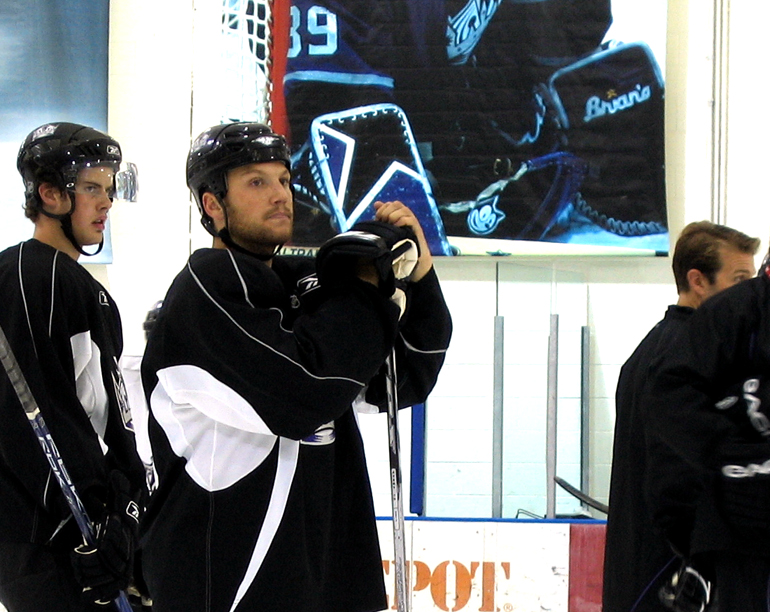
Avery with the Kings

In 2003–04, Avery played 76 games for the Kings, scoring 9 goals to go along with 19 assists. He also led the NHL in penalty minutes with 261.

During the 2004–05 NHL lockout, Avery briefly played in the Finnish Elite League with the Lahti Pelicans, and in the United Hockey League for the Motor City Mechanics. Along with 149 penalty minutes in just 16 games, he tallied 26 points for the Mechanics, including two hat tricks, making him the first player in Mechanics history to record two hat tricks in one season. Several players spoke publicly of their dissatisfaction with the NHL Players' Association’s leadership during the lockout, including Avery, who publicly blamed NHLPA president Bob Goodenow for wasting an entire season with a battle that alienated fans and yielded few results.

Avery led the league in penalty minutes for the second consecutive season in 2005-06, with 257. With three games remaining, the Kings unofficially suspended Avery for the remainder of the season after he refused to do a drill in practice. Nevertheless, the team re-signed him to a one-year deal.

During his time with the Kings, Avery has been said to have mocked Dustin Brown about his lisp. Former Kings' teammate Ian Laperrière said it "was bullying, like you might see in high school". But according to other players and coaches, Brown's lisp was not Avery's target; Brown's then girlfriend, now wife, Nicole was. Avery did not think Nicole was glamorous enough to be a "girlfriend of a hockey player in Hollywood."

=== New York Rangers (2007–2008) ===
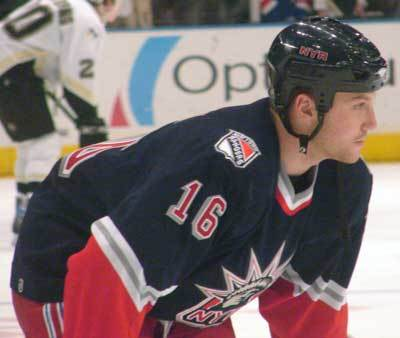
Avery in 2007

On February 5, 2007, in the middle of the 2006–07 season, Avery was traded to the New York Rangers. After joining the Rangers, he scored 20 points in 29 games to help the team complete a 17–4–6 end-of-season run to qualify for the playoffs. On March 17, Avery recorded a single-game career-high four points (one goal and three assists) against the Boston Bruins in a 7–0 victory. Avery played in his first career playoff game on April 12 against the Atlanta Thrashers, recording his first playoff points with a goal and an assist.

On August 1, 2007, Avery, as a restricted free agent, earned an arbitration award of $1.9 million for the 2007–08 season, which the Rangers accepted.

On February 16, 2008, in a game against the Buffalo Sabres, Avery scored 10 seconds into the game, setting a record for fastest goal scored by a Ranger on home ice.

=== Dallas Stars (2008) ===
Avery signed a four-year, $15.5 million contract with the Dallas Stars on July 2, 2008. In December 2008, the NHL suspended Avery after he made controversial remarks about other players dating his ex-girlfriends. After serving a six-game suspension and completing a counseling program, the Stars placed Avery on waivers on February 7, 2009.

=== Return to the Rangers (2009–2012) ===
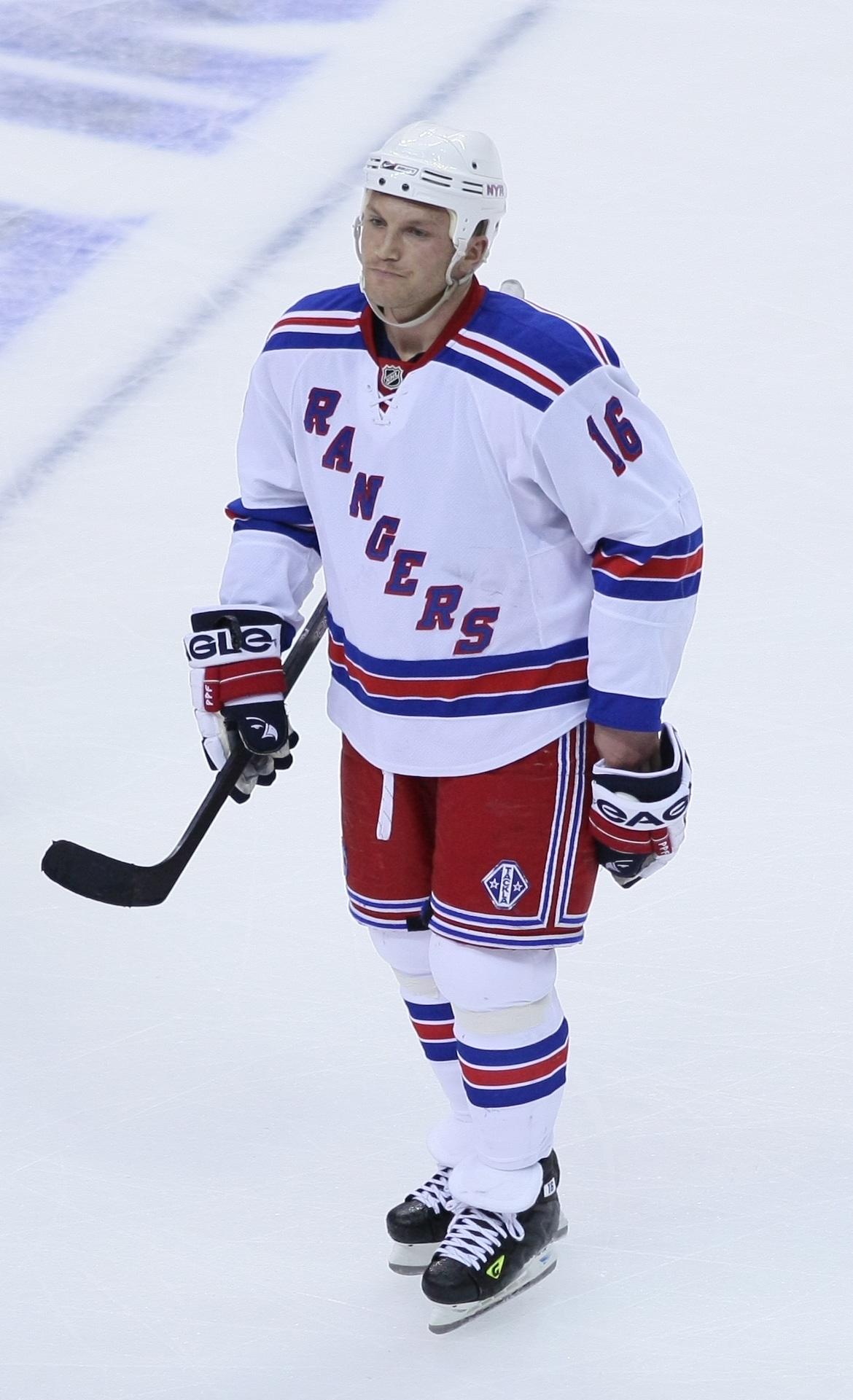
Avery in the 2009 playoffs

After clearing waivers on February 9, 2009, Avery was assigned to the Hartford Wolf Pack, the Rangers' AHL affiliate, although he remained a member of the Stars organization (that season, the Stars had no AHL affiliate). On March 2, Avery was placed on re-entry waivers by Dallas, and claimed by the Rangers the following day. On January 5, 2010, in a game against the Stars, his former team, Avery recorded one goal and three assists.

On October 4, 2011, the Rangers waived Avery. He later cleared waivers and re-joined the Rangers for their November 5 game against the Montreal Canadiens. After being a healthy scratch for nine games, Avery was once again placed on waivers on December 30, 2011. Since no NHL team claimed him, he returned to the AHL's Connecticut Whale. His last game played with the Whale was on January 27, 2012. He was left off the Whale's Clear Day list of players eligible to play for the remainder of the AHL season submitted on March 5, and told to no longer report to games or practices.

On March 12, 2012, Avery retired. He announced his retirement on Watch What Happens Live with host Andy Cohen.

=== Orlando Solar Bears (2022) ===
On February 23, 2022, the Orlando Solar Bears of the ECHL signed Avery to a standard player contract, putting him on the team's reserve list. Orlando released him two days later. Avery did not play in a game for the Solar Bears.

== Controversies and bullying ==
During and after his hockey career, Avery has been involved in a number of controversies. Red Wings general manager Ken Holland said he traded Avery during the 2002–03 season because he did not live up to the standards of an NHL professional. Avery has bullied people including Dustin Brown and Martin Brodeur.

=== Leukemia comments ===
In November 2007, an unnamed Rangers player accused Avery of making inappropriate comments about Toronto Maple Leafs player Jason Blake's diagnosis with leukemia during a pre-game fight with Darcy Tucker. Avery denied these allegations, citing two family losses to cancer and his involvement with cancer charities, including Hockey Fights Cancer. The NHL responded by fining Avery $2,500, Tucker $1,000, the Rangers $25,000, and the Leafs $10,000.

=== The Avery Rule ===
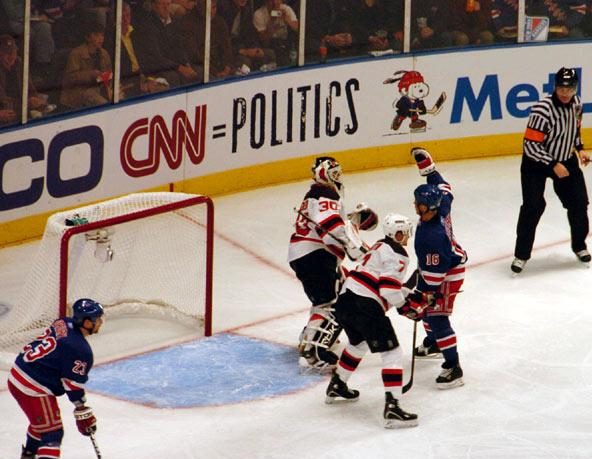
Avery "screening" Brodeur

During game three of the 2008 Eastern Conference quarterfinals against the New Jersey Devils, Avery turned his back on the play to face and screen Devils goaltender Martin Brodeur during a two-man advantage on the power play. He waved his hands and stick in front of Brodeur to distract him and block his view. The puck was later cleared out of the Devils' zone but on the second Rangers offensive attack, Avery scored a power play goal.

Avery spent the initial part of the play facing Brodeur while ignoring the puck, with his back to the play (normally, the player screening the goaltender is facing the play). The following day, the NHL issued an interpretation of the league's unsportsmanlike conduct rule to cover actions such as the one employed by Avery, which would now result in a minor penalty. This became known colloquially as "The Avery Rule".

Avery's tactics during that series earned multiple power plays, and he recorded three goals and two assists in the series, which the Rangers won in five games. His tactics were ineffective in the 2008 Eastern Conference semifinals against the Pittsburgh Penguins, with Avery dropped from the lineup after the Rangers lost the first three games, enroute to elimination from the playoffs in five games.

=== Heckling incident ===
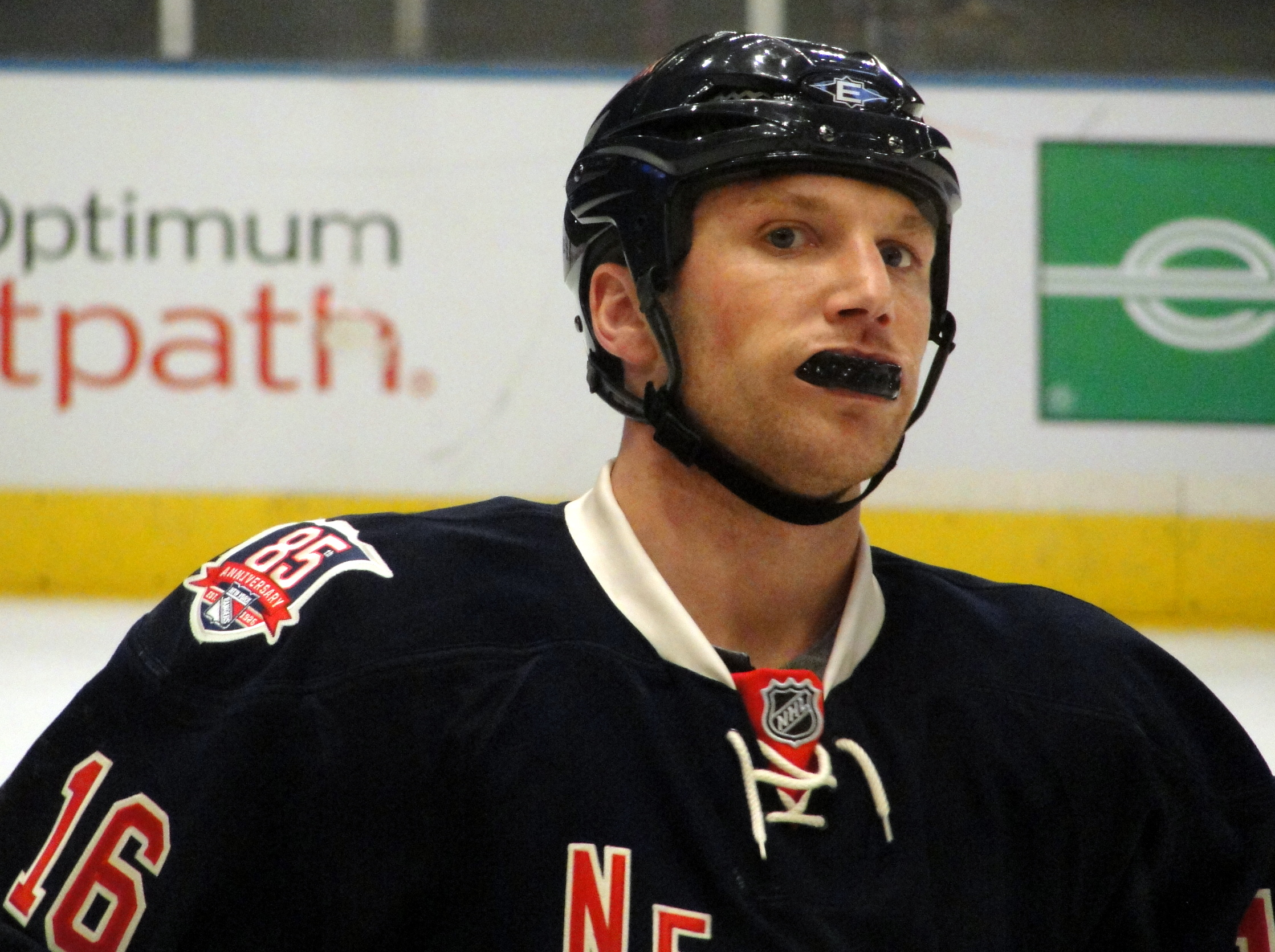
Avery during the 2010–11 season

On November 1, 2008, following a game with the Stars against the Boston Bruins, Avery was accused of shouting obscenities at a fan who had been heckling him during the game. A report of complaint was filed with the NHL, but no action was taken.

=== "Sloppy seconds" comment ===
On December 2, 2008, prior to the Stars' morning skate in preparation for a game against the Calgary Flames, Avery approached the assembled reporters in the dressing room and stated, "I just want to comment on how it's become like a common thing in the NHL for guys to fall in love with my sloppy seconds. I don't know what that's about, but enjoy the game tonight." At the time, two of Avery's ex-girlfriends were dating fellow NHL players: actress Elisha Cuthbert was dating Flames defenceman (and future husband) Dion Phaneuf, while model Rachel Hunter was dating Kings centre Jarret Stoll.

Within hours, the NHL suspended Avery indefinitely for "conduct detrimental to the league or the game of hockey". His comments were met with near-unanimous condemnation by the Stars organization, fellow players, and fans alike. Stars owner Tom Hicks said that the team would have suspended Avery had the NHL not acted first. Avery apologized the next day, calling his actions "inappropriate" and "a bad attempt to build excitement for the game".

On December 5, the NHL fixed Avery's suspension at six games, retroactive to the December 2 game against the Flames. He agreed to undergo anger management counselling due to what the NHL called unacceptable and antisocial behaviour. Commissioner Gary Bettman noted that both he and league disciplinarian Colin Campbell had warned Avery several times before about his behaviour. On December 14, after the last game of Avery's suspension, the Stars announced that Avery would not return to the team. One factor in the Stars decision was that coach Dave Tippett and several of the players, including Mike Modano and Marty Turco, let it be known they weren't willing to take him back on the team. Tippett had warned Avery not to talk to the media about his former girlfriends, and was outraged when he did so. According to TSN's James Duthie, Avery's teammates soured on him not long after he arrived. The "sloppy seconds" incident was the last straw, and Hicks had been actively looking to cut ties with him while the suspension was underway.

=== Feud with John Tortorella ===
Prior to his second stint with the Rangers, Avery had been called out on numerous occasions by then TSN commentator, future Rangers coach, and Stanley Cup winner John Tortorella, who is noted for his no-nonsense behaviour with his players and the press. After rejoining the Rangers, Avery’s relationship with Tortorella was uneasy, although in Avery's book he reports there were moments of mutual admiration. Nearly a year after Avery retired, on March 30, 2013, following the Rangers’ second consecutive shutout loss, Avery posted on his Twitter account about his former coach, "Fire this CLOWN, his players hate him and wont play for his BS." On May 29, 2013, after the Rangers lost to the Bruins in the Eastern Conference semifinals, Tortorella was fired.

=== Off-Broadway play ===
In November 2014, Avery was set to appear in Negative Is Positive, an off-Broadway play by Christy Smith-Sloman, but quit two days before opening night. According to reports, Avery had a meltdown after a stage manager offered him pizza, which he misinterpreted as an insult. An understudy filled in for Avery when the play premiered.

=== Criminal mischief trial ===
Avery used his Instagram account, named "officer_avery", to try to keep New York City's bike lanes clear of obstructions. After ramming his scooter into a minivan blocking a bike lane in New York City's West Village, Avery was charged with criminal mischief in 2019. Prosecutors offered him a plea deal that would involve him pleading guilty, paying a fine, and attending anger management classes. In an in-person hearing in April 2022, Avery dismissed his lawyer, chose to represent himself, and declined a bench trial, demanding instead a jury trial. His court date was set for May 23, 2022. This angered Avery, who lives and works in California, and who had demanded a trial on the same day as his hearing. At a pretrial hearing on May 23, Avery attended via FaceTime and was represented by an attorney. He was ordered to appear in person on June 15.

Avery tried to use his podcast to rally supporters to attend his trial, although only two were in attendance. On June 16, the second day of his trial, Avery was convicted of attempted criminal mischief, a misdemeanor. He was ordered to pay a $205 surcharge and was barred from contact with his victims for three years.

== Advertising ==
After retiring from the NHL in 2012, Avery began working at Lipman, a New York City-based advertising and creative agency. Avery helped develop strategies for the company and worked as a model. He also handled a range of assignments for Lipman's parent company, Revolate Holdings.

== Fashion ==
=== Vogue ===
In April 2008, it was announced that Avery would spend the summer offseason interning at Vogue magazine. In June 2008, Avery guest-edited Mensvogue.com, the website for Men's Vogue magazine. His interest mainly resides with women's fashion; of men's fashion Avery has said, "You do suits and pants and that's about that. Women's clothes tell a story. That's what's interesting to me."

In 2008, New Line Cinema put into development a film based on Avery’s life, focusing on his status as a professional athlete with an active interest in fashion, including a summer internship at Vogue. Stan Chervin was hired to write the script.

=== Commonwealth Utilities ===
In 2009, Avery worked with men's fashion label Commonwealth Utilities to present a clothing line for New York Fashion Week.

== Modeling ==
=== Hickey Freeman ===
Avery was hired to be the face of Hickey Freeman's Spring/Summer 2012 ad campaign, shot by Francesco Carrozzini. The print ads appeared in Vanity Fair, DC Modern Luxury, and other magazines. As of 2021, he is no longer working with Hickey Freeman.

=== 7 For All Mankind ===
Avery was in the 2013 campaign for 7 for All Mankind called A Beautiful Odyssey. He also appeared in print ads.

== Film and television appearances ==
Avery had a small role in the 2005 Maurice Richard biopic The Rocket: The Legend of Rocket Richard, portraying former New York Rangers defenseman Bob Dill.

Avery appeared in a 2007 episode of MADtv with Kings teammates Tom Kostopoulos and Scott Thornton.

He was on People magazine’s Sexiest Man Alive 2007 list.

He was a guest on a 2009 episode of Late Night with Jimmy Fallon; a Top Ten List presenter on a 2009 episode of Late Show with David Letterman; a guest judge on Project Runway: All Stars in 2012; and appeared on Fashion Police in 2013.

On March 4, 2014, he was announced as one of the celebrities who would take part in the 18th season of Dancing with the Stars. He partnered with Karina Smirnoff. The two were the second couple to be eliminated on week 2 after a double elimination.

He appeared in two movies starring Mark Wahlberg and directed by Peter Berg: 2016's Patriots Day and 2018's Mile 22.

In January 2020, Avery announced he was cast in Christopher Nolan's film Tenet. He also appeared in Nolan's Oppenheimer in 2023, and appeared in 2026's The Odyssey.

In 2021, he appeared in S01E06 of the AMC Series Kevin Can F**k Himself as himself.

He has appeared multiple times in 2021–22 as a guest commentator on the Gutfeld! show on Fox News.

In 2025, Avery cameoed in an episode of the Crave original comedy series Shoresy.

=== Filmography ===
Film

Year	Title	Role	Notes
2005	The Rocket	Bob Dill	
2016	Patriots Day	Watertown Officer	
2018	Mile 22	Assault One	
2020	Spree	Officer Hall	
2020	Tenet	Red Soldier 1	
2022	Amsterdam	Battalion Leader	
2023	Oppenheimer	Weatherman	
2025	Happy Gilmore 2	Henchman #1	
2025	The Wilderness	Rich	
2026	The Odyssey	Laodamas	

Television

Year	Title	Role	Notes
2007	MADtv	Himself	1 episode
2021	Kevin Can F**k Himself	Himself	1 episode
2023	Lioness	SF Operator in bar	1 Episode
2025	Shoresy	Himself	1 Episode

== Book ==
Avery's memoir, Ice Capades: A Memoir of Fast Living and Tough Hockey (titled Offside: My Life Crossing the Line in Canada), was published by Blue Rider Press on October 24, 2017. On September 9th, 2025 he released an adult romance novel called Summer Skate. The novel was co-written with Leslie Cohen.

== Activism ==
In May 2011, Avery recorded a video for the New Yorkers for Marriage Equality campaign, in support of same-sex marriage. In an interview with The New York Times, he stated, "I certainly have been surrounded by the gay community. And living in New York and when you live in L.A., you certainly have a lot of gay friends." Avery also travelled to Albany, New York, to lobby politicians prior to the July 2011 legalization of same-sex marriage in New York State.

In 2012, Avery was a member of the board of directors of Athlete Ally.

== Personal life ==
Avery married model Hilary Rhoda at the Parrish Art Museum in New York on October 10, 2015. The couple had been engaged since November 8, 2013. The two first met at Warren 77 in the summer of 2009. The couple had been publicly estranged from Rhoda's mother for several years.

Avery and Rhoda have a son born in 2020. Rhoda filed for divorce from Avery in July 2022.

In 2022 court documents, Rhoda accused Avery of both domestic and child abuse. She alleged that "He has engaged in many instances of physical abuse against me and against third parties. Sean has also been physically and emotionally abusive to our son, Nash." She alleged that, Avery "body slammed Nash on his changing table," which she said left the toddler "so afraid" that "he cried uncontrollably and couldn't catch his breath." In 2022, Avery was arrested for domestic battery and a temporary restraining order was issued requiring him to stay 100 yards away from Rhoda, her workplace, and their son's school.

== Career statistics ==
Bold indicates led league

			Regular season					Playoffs
Season	Team	League	GP	G	A	Pts	PIM	GP	G	A	Pts	PIM
1995–96	Markham Waxers	MetJHL	1	0	0	0	4	—	—	—	—	—
1996–97	Owen Sound Platers	OHL	58	10	21	31	86	4	1	0	1	4
1997–98	Owen Sound Platers	OHL	47	13	41	54	105	11	1	11	12	23
1998–99	Owen Sound Platers	OHL	28	22	23	45	70	—	—	—	—	—
1998–99	Kingston Frontenacs	OHL	33	14	25	39	88	5	1	3	4	13
1999–2000	Kingston Frontenacs	OHL	55	28	56	84	215	5	2	2	4	26
2000–01	Cincinnati Mighty Ducks	AHL	58	8	15	23	304	4	1	0	1	19
2001–02	Cincinnati Mighty Ducks	AHL	36	14	7	21	106	—	—	—	—	—
2001–02	Detroit Red Wings	NHL	36	2	2	4	68	—	—	—	—	—
2002–03	Detroit Red Wings	NHL	39	5	6	11	120	—	—	—	—	—
2002–03	Los Angeles Kings	NHL	12	1	3	4	33	—	—	—	—	—
2002–03	Manchester Monarchs	AHL	—	—	—	—	—	3	2	1	3	8
2003–04	Los Angeles Kings	NHL	76	9	19	28	**261**	—	—	—	—	—
2004–05	Pelicans	SM-l	2	3	0	3	26	—	—	—	—	—
2004–05	Motor City Mechanics	UHL	16	15	11	26	149	—	—	—	—	—
2005–06	Los Angeles Kings	NHL	75	15	24	39	**257**	—	—	—	—	—
2006–07	Los Angeles Kings	NHL	55	10	18	28	116	—	—	—	—	—
2006–07	New York Rangers	NHL	29	8	12	20	58	10	1	4	5	27
2007–08	New York Rangers	NHL	57	15	18	33	154	8	4	3	7	6
2008–09	Dallas Stars	NHL	23	3	7	10	77	—	—	—	—	—
2008–09	Hartford Wolf Pack	AHL	8	2	1	3	8	—	—	—	—	—
2008–09	New York Rangers	NHL	18	5	7	12	34	6	0	2	2	24
2009–10	New York Rangers	NHL	69	11	20	31	160	—	—	—	—	—
2010–11	New York Rangers	NHL	76	3	21	24	174	4	0	1	1	12
2011–12	New York Rangers	NHL	15	3	0	3	21	—	—	—	—	—
2011–12	Connecticut Whale	AHL	7	2	1	3	39	—	—	—	—	—
NHL totals			580	90	157	247	1,533	28	5	10	15	69

== Transactions ==
- January 11, 1999 – Traded to Kingston (OHL) by Owen Sound (OHL) with Steve Lafleur for Aaron Fransen and D. J. Maracle.
- September 21, 1999 – Signed as a free agent with the Detroit Red Wings.
- March 11, 2003 – Traded by the Red Wings, along with Maxim Kuznetsov, Detroit's 2003 first-round draft choice and 2004 second-round draft choice, to the Los Angeles Kings in exchange for Mathieu Schneider.
- November 24, 2004 – Signed as a free agent by Lahti (Finland).
- February 11, 2005 – Signed as a free agent by Motor City (UHL).
- February 5, 2007 – Traded by the Kings, along with John Seymour, to the New York Rangers in exchange for Jason Ward, Jan Marek, Marc-André Cliche and New York's 2008 third-round draft choice.
- July 2, 2008 – Signed as a free agent with the Dallas Stars.
- March 3, 2009 – Claimed off re-entry waivers by the Rangers.
- October 11, 2011 – Re-assigned to the Connecticut Whale (AHL).
- March 12, 2012 – Announces retirement.
