= Commonwealth Utilities =

Commonwealth Utilities was a men's fashion label based in New York City. It was led by designers, Richard Christiansen and Anthony Keegan, who was a former designer at Versace, Armani, and Donna Karan. Its name is derived from the fact that Christiansen and Anthony are originally from the Commonwealth of Nations (Canada and Australia, respectively).

Ice hockey player Sean Avery worked with Commonwealth Utilities for New York Fashion Week 2009.
