= Sloppy seconds =

Type of sex act

Sloppy seconds (or slops in Australian slang) is a slang phrase for when a man has sexual intercourse with a (female or male) partner shortly after that person has had intercourse with someone else, and is therefore wet or "sloppy". The phrase "buttered bun" is sometimes used to refer to said orifice. The practice is also referred to as a "wet deck".

The term has since been stretched as a derogatory metaphor to demean someone having a relationship with a person who had previously been dating another individual within the peer group, analogous to the way female virginity has historically been correlated with purity.

In December 2008, the NHL suspended Sean Avery after he made a "sloppy seconds" comment about other players dating his ex-girlfriends.

In November 2022, South Australian Premier Peter Malinauskas was criticised after using the term in a press conference. He apologised, and said he was not aware that it was a sexual term.

== See also ==
- Creampie (sexual act)
- Snowballing (sexual practice)
- Threesome
