= Dirty Mountain =

Mountain in Wyoming, United States

Coordinates: 41°24′58.86″N 105°24′10.99″W

Dirty Mountain is a summit in Albany County, Wyoming, in the United States. With an elevation of 8,340 feet (2,540 m), Dirty Mountain is the 764th highest summit in the state of Wyoming.
