= D.i.R.T.: Origin of the Species =

2006 video game

- Developer: Nu Generation Games
- Publishers: Tri Synergy, Nobilis, THQ
- Composer: Peter Connelly
- Platform: Windows
- Release: 2006
- Genres: Action-adventure, third-person shooter

DiRT: Origin of the Species (also known under the name Eva Cash: DIRT Project) is a third-person shooter / action-adventure computer game developed by British studio Nu Generation Games and published by Tri Synergy in 2006. It was published by Nobilis in France and THQ Entertainment in Germany.

== Plot and gameplay ==
Eva Cash, also called Dirt, wakes up in a prison cell and must work out what happened to her.

The game plays like a typical third-person shooter where Eva travels through mostly linear levels in search for an exit. The game contains over 20 weapons.

== Development ==
Nu Generation Games was founded in 2002 in Nottingham, UK, and their members came from Core Design / Eidos plc. The company was founded to create original games that weren't bound by the restrictions of licensed titles.

The game was announced in a press release on 21 May 2004, and Nu Generation and Tri Synergy released the first eight game screenshots on 20 December 2004. The game was originally scheduled for Spring 2005 but this was delayed in March 2005. Two trailers were released in anticipation for E3 2005. A Russian-language site featuring extra information about the game was unveiled by Nu Generation on 6 September 2006. By 20 November 2006, the PC version of the game was ready to be published in the US. It was originally meant to be released on PC in France in April 2007, but by mid 2007, the game was yet to be released on the PC and PlayStation 2. In March 2007, Nobilis France held a competition to find a lookalike Eva Cash. The publisher unveiled the official French website for the game in April of that year.

== Reception ==
Jeuxvideo felt the game's good ideas were let down by the "obsolete and ill-conceived game mechanics". Gameswelt felt the story was "pretty stupid". 4Players felt that the game exemplifies the perception that the better a game's box art was, the more the developers were trying to hide. Gry Online acknowledged the game's advanced graphics engine. Gamezone felt that character animations were choppy and that it would appeal to those who were having a withdrawal from a lack of Tomb Raider-esque games. GameSpot criticised the game's numerous bugs. ComputerBills felt the name "Dirt" was an apt name because the game came across as filth (German for "dirt" is "dreck", which also means filth). Gamer.no felt the game was a low-budget title with archaic graphics and lots of bugs.

The game won the 4Players award for 2007 – Worst Game of the Year.
