= Dirty Point =

Mountain in New Mexico, United States

Coordinates: 34.995°N 107.2547°W

Dirty Point is a summit in Cibola County, New Mexico, in the United States. With an elevation of 5,709 feet (1,740 m), Dirty Point is the 2090th highest summit in the state of New Mexico.
