= Filth =

Filth or The Filth may refer to:

== Common uses ==
- Dirt, unclean matter
- Police officer, a pejorative in British slang

== Arts, entertainment, and media ==
=== Films ===
- Filth (film), a 2013 film based on the novel
- Filth, an alternative title for Sauna, a 2008 horror film
- Filth: The Mary Whitehouse Story, a 2008 BBC docudrama

=== Literature ===
- Filth (novel), a 1998 novel by Irvine Welsh
- FILTH by Jingan Young, the first English language play commissioned by the Hong Kong Arts Festival

=== Music ===
- Filth (Andrew Dice Clay album), Andrew Dice Clay comedy album
- Filth (Maranatha album), 2015
- Filth (Swans album), 1983
- Filth (Venetian Snares album), 2009
- The Filth (album), a 1987 album by Sonny Black's Blues Band, or the title song
- F.I.L.T.H., 2024 EP by Pvris

==== Other uses in music ====
- Filth (band), an American hardcore punk band
- The Filth, or Philip Pilf and the Filth, purported working name of English band Cardiacs
- Filth, a term used both to describe and refer to some kinds of dubstep

=== Other uses in arts, entertainment, and media ===
- The Filth (comics), a comic book series by Grant Morrison

== See also ==
- Filthy (disambiguation)
