= 2007–08 Boston Bruins season =

NHL team season

2007–08 Boston Bruins
- Division: 3rd Northeast
- Conference: 8th Eastern
- 2007–08 record: 41–29–12
- Home record: 21–16–4
- Road record: 20–13–8
- Goals for: 212
- Goals against: 222

Team information
- General manager: Peter Chiarelli
- Coach: Claude Julien
- Captain: Zdeno Chara
- Alternate captains: Patrice Bergeron; Glen Murray
- Arena: TD Banknorth Garden
- Average attendance: 15,384 (87.6%)

Team leaders
- Goals: Marco Sturm (27)
- Assists: Marc Savard (63)
- Points: Marc Savard (78)
- Penalty minutes: Zdeno Chara (114)
- Plus/minus: Zdeno Chara (+14)
- Wins: Tim Thomas (28)
- Goals against average: Tim Thomas (2.44)

The 2007–08 Boston Bruins season began on October 5, 2007. It was the 84th season of the Boston Bruins in the National Hockey League (NHL).

The Bruins entered the 2007–08 season with a new head coach after the team fired Dave Lewis shortly before the 2007 NHL entry draft.

Key dates prior to the start of the season:

- The 2007 NHL entry draft took place in Columbus, Ohio, on June 22–23.
- The free agency period began on July 1.

== Regular season ==
=== Divisional standings ===
Northeast Division
		GP	W	L	OTL	GF	GA	Pts
**1**	**Montreal Canadiens**	**82**	**47**	**25**	**10**	**262**	**222**	**104**
**2**	**Ottawa Senators**	**82**	**43**	**31**	**8**	**261**	**247**	**94**
**3**	**Boston Bruins**	**82**	**41**	**29**	**12**	**212**	**222**	**94**
4	Buffalo Sabres	82	39	31	12	255	242	90
5	Toronto Maple Leafs	82	36	35	11	231	260	83

=== Conference standings ===
Eastern Conference
R		Div	GP	W	L	OTL	GF	GA	Pts
**1**	**z – Montreal Canadiens**	**NE**	**82**	**47**	**25**	**10**	**262**	**222**	104
**2**	**y – Pittsburgh Penguins**	**AT**	**82**	**47**	**27**	**8**	**247**	**216**	102
**3**	**y – Washington Capitals**	**SE**	**82**	**43**	**31**	**8**	**242**	**231**	94
**4**	**New Jersey Devils**	**AT**	**82**	**46**	**29**	**7**	**206**	**197**	99
**5**	**New York Rangers**	**AT**	**82**	**42**	**27**	**13**	**213**	**199**	97
**6**	**Philadelphia Flyers**	**AT**	**82**	**42**	**29**	**11**	**248**	**233**	95
**7**	**Ottawa Senators**	**NE**	**82**	**43**	**31**	**8**	**261**	**247**	94
**8**	**Boston Bruins**	**NE**	**82**	**41**	**29**	**12**	**212**	**222**	94
8.5
9	Carolina Hurricanes	SE	82	43	33	6	252	249	92
10	Buffalo Sabres	NE	82	39	31	12	255	242	90
11	Florida Panthers	SE	82	38	35	9	216	226	85
12	Toronto Maple Leafs	NE	82	36	35	11	231	260	83
13	New York Islanders	AT	82	35	38	9	194	243	79
14	Atlanta Thrashers	SE	82	34	40	8	216	272	76
15	Tampa Bay Lightning	SE	82	31	42	9	223	267	71

Divisions: AT – Atlantic, NE – Northeast, SE – Southeast

bold – qualified for playoffs, y – division winner, z – placed first in conference (and division)

== Playoffs ==
The Bruins qualified for the NHL's Stanley Cup Playoffs for the first time since the 2003–04 NHL season, facing their traditional arch-rivals, the Montreal Canadiens. The Boston Bruins were down 3–1 in the series facing elimination, but climbed back to 3–3. The series moved to game 7 in Montreal on April 21, however the Bruins lost the game and were narrowly eliminated.

== Schedule and results ==
=== Regular season ===
2007–08 regular season
October: 6–4–0 (home: 3–1–0; road: 3–3–0)

Game	Date	Visitor	Score	Home	OT	Decision	Attendance	Record	Pts	Recap
1	October 5	Boston Bruins	1–4	Dallas Stars		Manny Fernandez	18,532	0–1–0	0	L
2	October 6	Boston Bruins	3–1	Phoenix Coyotes		Tim Thomas	14,087	1–1–0	2	W
3	October 10	Boston Bruins	1–2	Anaheim Ducks		Tim Thomas	17,285	1–2–0	2	L
4	October 12	Boston Bruins	8–6	Los Angeles Kings		Manny Fernandez	17,064	2–2–0	4	W
5	October 13	Boston Bruins	2–1	San Jose Sharks		Tim Thomas	17,496	3–2–0	6	W
6	October 18	Tampa Bay Lightning	1–4	Boston Bruins		Tim Thomas	16,363	4–2–0	8	W
7	October 20	NY Rangers	0–1	Boston Bruins	SO	Manny Fernandez	15,266	5–2–0	10	W
8	October 22	Boston Bruins	1–6	Montreal Canadiens		Manny Fernandez	21,273	5–3–0	10	L
9	October 25	Chicago Blackhawks	1–3	Boston Bruins		Tim Thomas	10,290	6–3–0	12	W
10	October 27	Philadelphia Flyers	2–1	Boston Bruins		Tim Thomas	14,956	6–4–0	12	L

November: 7–4–2 (home: 4–1–1; road: 3–3–1)

Game	Date	Visitor	Score	Home	OT	Decision	Attendance	Record	Pts	Recap
11	November 1	Buffalo Sabres	3–4	Boston Bruins	OT	Tim Thomas	13,479	7–4–0	14	W
12	November 3	Boston Bruins	2–3	Ottawa Senators		Tim Thomas	19,939	7–5–0	14	L
13	November 4	Ottawa Senators	2–1	Boston Bruins	SO	Tim Thomas	10,087	7–5–1	15	OTL
14	November 7	Boston Bruins	1–2	Buffalo Sabres	OT	Tim Thomas	18,690	7–5–2	16	OTL
15	November 8	Montreal Canadiens	2–1	Boston Bruins		Tim Thomas	15,183	7–6–2	16	L
16	November 10	Buffalo Sabres	1–2	Boston Bruins		Tim Thomas	17,565	8–6–2	18	W
17	November 15	Toronto Maple Leafs	2–5	Boston Bruins		Tim Thomas	16,373	9–6–2	20	W
18	November 17	Boston Bruins	4–7	Montreal Canadiens		Tim Thomas	21,173	9–7–2	20	L
19	November 20	Boston Bruins	4–2	Toronto Maple Leafs		Tuukka Rask	19,441	10–7–2	22	W
20	November 23	NY Islanders	1–2	Boston Bruins		Tim Thomas	17,565	11–7–2	24	W
21	November 24	Boston Bruins	1–2	NY Islanders		Tim Thomas	16,234	11–8–2	24	L
22	November 26	Boston Bruins	6–3	Philadelphia Flyers		Tuukka Rask	19,457	12–8–2	26	W
23	November 29	Boston Bruins	4–3	Florida Panthers		Tim Thomas	14,926	13–8–2	28	W

December: 6–8–2 (home: 2–4–1; road: 4–4–1)

Game	Date	Visitor	Score	Home	OT	Decision	Attendance	Record	Pts	Recap
24	December 1	Boston Bruins	1–4	Tampa Bay Lightning		Tim Thomas	18,444	13–9–2	28	L
25	December 3	Boston Bruins	3–1	NY Islanders		Tim Thomas	11,040	14–9–2	30	W
26	December 5	Boston Bruins	3–4	New Jersey Devils	OT	Tuukka Rask	14,012	14–9–3	31	OTL
27	December 6	Montreal Canadiens	4–2	Boston Bruins		Tuukka Rask	14,977	14–10–3	31	L
28	December 8	Boston Bruins	2–1	Toronto Maple Leafs		Alex Auld	18,819	15–10–3	33	W
29	December 10	Boston Bruins	4–1	Buffalo Sabres		Alex Auld	18,302	16–10–3	35	W
30	December 12	Boston Bruins	5–3	Atlanta Thrashers		Alex Auld	14,265	17–10–3	37	W
31	December 13	New Jersey Devils	3–1	Boston Bruins		Alex Auld	12,064	17–11–3	37	L
32	December 15	Columbus Blue Jackets	0–2	Boston Bruins		Alex Auld	14,058	18–11–3	39	W
33	December 18	Ottawa Senators	3–2	Boston Bruins		Alex Auld	14,874	18–12–3	39	L
34	December 20	Pittsburgh Penguins	5–4	Boston Bruins	SO	Tim Thomas	15,304	18–12–4	40	OTL
35	December 22	St. Louis Blues	4–1	Boston Bruins		Tim Thomas	14,200	18–13–4	40	L
36	December 23	Boston Bruins	2–4	Pittsburgh Penguins		Alex Auld	17,060	18–14–4	40	L
37	December 28	Boston Bruins	3–4	Carolina Hurricanes		Tim Thomas	18,680	18–15–4	40	L
38	December 29	Boston Bruins	0–5	Atlanta Thrashers		Alex Auld	18,545	18–16–4	40	L
39	December 31	Atlanta Thrashers	2–5	Boston Bruins		Tim Thomas	17,565	19–16–4	42	W

January: 8–3–1 (home: 5–2–1; road: 3–1–0)

Game	Date	Visitor	Score	Home	OT	Decision	Attendance	Record	Pts	Recap
40	January 3	Washington Capitals	0–2	Boston Bruins		Tim Thomas	12,240	20–16–4	44	W
41	January 5	New Jersey Devils	3–4	Boston Bruins		Tim Thomas	17,565	21–16–4	46	W
42	January 8	Carolina Hurricanes	1–0	Boston Bruins		Tim Thomas	14,549	21–17–4	46	L
43	January 10	Montreal Canadiens	5–2	Boston Bruins		Tim Thomas	17,565	21–18–4	46	L
44	January 12	Boston Bruins	4–3	Philadelphia Flyers	OT	Alex Auld	19,792	22–18–4	48	W
45	January 17	Toronto Maple Leafs	3–2	Boston Bruins	SO	Alex Auld	13,907	22–18–5	49	OTL
46	January 19	NY Rangers	3–4	Boston Bruins	SO	Tim Thomas	17,565	23–18–5	51	W
47	January 20	Boston Bruins	3–1	NY Rangers		Tim Thomas	18,200	24–18–5	53	W
48	January 22	Boston Bruins	2–8	Montreal Canadiens		Alex Auld	21,273	24–19–5	53	L
49	January 24	NY Islanders	1–4	Boston Bruins		Tim Thomas	13,461	25–19–5	55	W
50	January 29	Nashville Predators	1–3	Boston Bruins		Tim Thomas	14,150	26–19–5	57	W
51	January 31	Boston Bruins	4–1	Ottawa Senators		Tim Thomas	19,959	27–19–5	59	W

February: 7–4–1 (home: 2–4–0; road: 4–0–1)

Game	Date	Visitor	Score	Home	OT	Decision	Attendance	Record	Pts	Recap
52	February 2	Detroit Red Wings	3–1	Boston Bruins		Tim Thomas	17,565	27–20–5	59	L
53	February 5	Buffalo Sabres	4–2	Boston Bruins		Tim Thomas	13,427	27–21–5	59	L
54	February 8	Boston Bruins	3–2	Buffalo Sabres	SO	Alex Auld	14,465	28–21–5	61	W
55	February 9	Florida Panthers	6–3	Boston Bruins		Tim Thomas	14,365	28–22–5	61	L
56	February 12	Carolina Hurricanes	3–2	Boston Bruins		Alex Auld	15,300	28–23–5	61	L
57	February 13	Boston Bruins	2–1	Pittsburgh Penguins		Tim Thomas	16,982	29–23–5	63	W
58	February 16	Boston Bruins	3–4	Toronto Maple Leafs	OT	Tim Thomas	19,481	29–23–6	64	OTL
59	February 19	Boston Bruins	3–2	Carolina Hurricanes	SO	Tim Thomas	17,552	30–23–6	66	W
60	February 21	Boston Bruins	5–4	Florida Panthers	SO	Alex Auld	14,992	31–23–6	68	W
61	February 23	Boston Bruins	5–3	Tampa Bay Lightning		Alex Auld	20,519	32–23–6	70	W
62	February 26	Ottawa Senators	0–4	Boston Bruins		Tim Thomas	13,451	33–23–6	72	W
63	February 28	Pittsburgh Penguins	1–5	Boston Bruins		Tim Thomas	17,565	34–23–6	74	W

March: 6–5–5 (home: 5–3–1; road: 1–2–4)

Game	Date	Visitor	Score	Home	OT	Decision	Attendance	Record	Pts	Recap
64	March 1	Atlanta Thrashers	2–3	Boston Bruins	SO	Tim Thomas	17,565	35–23–6	76	W
65	March 3	Boston Bruins	2–10	Washington Capitals		Tim Thomas	16,548	35–24–6	76	L
66	March 4	Florida Panthers	1–0	Boston Bruins	OT	Alex Auld	16,478	35–24–7	77	OTL
67	March 6	Toronto Maple Leafs	8–2	Boston Bruins		Tim Thomas	17,565	35–25–7	77	L
68	March 8	Washington Capitals	1–2	Boston Bruins		Alex Auld	17,565	36–25–7	79	W
69	March 9	Boston Bruins	0–1	NY Rangers	SO	Alex Auld	18,200	36–25–8	80	OTL
70	March 11	Boston Bruins	1–4	Ottawa Senators		Alex Auld	20,143	36–26–8	80	L
71	March 13	Tampa Bay Lightning	3–1	Boston Bruins		Tim Thomas	13,373	36–27–8	80	L
72	March 15	Philadelphia Flyers	2–3	Boston Bruins	OT	Tim Thomas	17,565	37–27–8	82	W
73	March 16	Boston Bruins	1–2	Washington Capitals	SO	Alex Auld	18,277	37–27–9	83	OTL
74	March 20	Montreal Canadiens	4–2	Boston Bruins		Tim Thomas	17,565	37–28–9	83	L
75	March 22	Boston Bruins	2–3	Montreal Canadiens	SO	Tim Thomas	21,273	37–28–10	84	OTL
76	March 25	Boston Bruins	6–2	Toronto Maple Leafs		Tim Thomas	19,562	38–28–10	86	W
77	March 27	Toronto Maple Leafs	2–4	Boston Bruins		Tim Thomas	17,565	39–28–10	88	W
78	March 29	Ottawa Senators	0–4	Boston Bruins		Tim Thomas	17,565	40–28–10	90	W
79	March 30	Boston Bruins	1–2	Buffalo Sabres	OT	Alex Auld	18,690	40–28–11	91	OTL

April: 1–1–1 (home: 0–1–0; road: 1–0–1)

Game	Date	Visitor	Score	Home	OT	Decision	Attendance	Record	Pts	Recap
80	April 2	Boston Bruins	2–3	New Jersey Devils	SO	Tim Thomas	16,144	40–28–12	92	OTL
81	April 4	Boston Bruins	2–1	Ottawa Senators		Tim Thomas	20,232	41–28–12	94	W
82	April 6	Buffalo Sabres	3–0	Boston Bruins		Tim Thomas	19,563	41–29–12	94	L

Legend: W Win (2 points) L Loss (0 points) OTL Overtime/shootout loss (1 point)

=== Playoffs ===
2008 Stanley Cup playoffs
Eastern Conference Quarterfinals vs. (1) Montreal Canadiens – Canadiens win 4–3

Game	Date	Visitor	Score	Home	OT	BOS goals	MTL goals	Decision	Attendance	Series	Recap
1	April 10	Boston Bruins	1–4	Montreal Canadiens		Hnidy	S. Kostitsyn, A. Kostitsyn, Smolinski, Kostopoulos	Thomas	21,273	0–1	L
2	April 12	Boston Bruins	2–3	Montreal Canadiens	2:30	Schaefer, Krejci	Hamrlik, S. Kostitsyn, Kovalev	Thomas	21,273	0–2	L
3	April 13	Montreal Canadiens	1–2	Boston Bruins	9:25	Lucic, Savard	Kostopoulos	Thomas	17,565	1–2	W
4	April 15	Montreal Canadiens	1–0	Boston Bruins			Brisebois	Thomas	17,565	1–3	L
5	April 17	Boston Bruins	5–1	Montreal Canadiens		Kessel, Metropolit, Chara, Sturm, Sobotka	Kovalev	Thomas	21,273	2–3	W
6	April 19	Montreal Canadiens	4–5	Boston Bruins		Kessel (2), Sobotka, Lucic, Sturm	Higgins (2), Plekanec, Bouillon	Thomas	17,565	3–3	W
7	April 21	Boston Bruins	0–5	Montreal Canadiens			Komisarek, Streit, A. Kostitsyn (2), S. Kostitsyn	Thomas	21,273	3–4	L

Legend: W Win L Loss

- Scorer of game-winning goal in italics

== Player statistics ==
=== Skaters ===
Note: GP = Games played; G = Goals; A = Assists; Pts = Points; +/− = Plus–minus; PIM = Penalty minutes

Regular season

Player	GP	G	A	Pts	+/−	PIM
Andrew Alberts	35	0	2	2	4	39
P. J. Axelsson	75	13	16	29	11	15
Patrice Bergeron	10	3	4	7	2	2
Zdeno Chara	77	17	34	51	14	114
Andrew Ference	59	1	14	15	−14	50
Shane Hnidy	43	1	4	5	−4	41
Matt Hunwick	13	0	1	1	−1	4
Phil Kessel	82	19	18	37	−6	28
Chuck Kobasew	73	22	17	39	6	29
David Krejci	56	6	21	27	−3	20
Matt Lashoff	18	1	4	5	−2	0
Milan Lucic	77	8	19	27	−2	89
Glen Metropolit	82	11	22	33	−3	36
Glen Murray	63	17	13	30	−4	50
Petteri Nokelainen	57	7	3	10	0	19
Jeremy Reich	58	2	2	4	−5	78
Marc Savard	74	15	63	78	3	66
Peter Schaefer	63	9	17	26	4	18
Vladimir Sobotka	48	1	6	7	1	24
Mark Stuart	82	4	4	8	2	81
Marco Sturm	80	27	29	56	11	40
Shawn Thornton	58	4	3	7	−1	74
Aaron Ward	65	5	8	13	9	54
Dennis Wideman	81	13	23	36	11	70
Combined	—	206	347	553	33	1041

=== Goaltenders ===
Note: GPI = Games Played In; MIN = Minutes played; GAA = Goals against average; W = Wins; L = Losses; OT = Overtime/shootout losses; SO = Shutouts; SA = Shots Against; GA = Goals against; SV%= Save percentage

Regular season

Player	GPI	MIN	GAA	W	L	OT	SO	SA	GA	SV%
Tim Thomas	57	3,341	2.44	28	19	6	3	1731	136	.921
Alex Auld	23	1,213	2.32	9	7	5	2	578	47	.919
Manny Fernandez	4	244	3.93	2	2	0	1	95	16	.832
Tuukka Rask	4	184	3.26	2	1	1	0	88	10	.886
Combined	—	4982	2.99	41	29	12	6	2492	209	.904

== Awards and records ==
=== Milestones ===
Regular season
Player	Milestone	Reached
Andrew Ference	400th NHL PIM	October 5, 2007
Milan Lucic	1st NHL game	October 5, 2007
David Krejci	1st NHL assist 1st NHL point	October 6, 2007
Phil Kessel	1st NHL hat-trick	October 12, 2007
Milan Lucic	1st NHL goal 1st NHL assist 1st NHL point	October 12, 2007
Marc Savard	500th NHL point	October 12, 2007
Peter Schaefer	500th NHL game	October 20, 2007
Matt Hunwick	1st NHL game	November 10, 2007
Andrew Alberts	200th NHL PIM	November 10, 2007
Marc Savard	600th NHL game	November 10, 2007
Tuukka Rask	1st NHL game 1st NHL win	November 20, 2007
Dennis Wideman	18,000th Bruins all-time goal	December 31, 2007
Glen Metropolit	100th NHL point	January 29, 2008
Marco Sturm	200th NHL assist	February 9, 2008
Vladimir Sobotka	1st NHL goal	February 13, 2008
P. J. Axelsson	700th NHL game	February 21, 2008
David Krejci	1st NHL goal	February 26, 2008
Marc Savard	400th NHL assist	February 28, 2008
Marco Sturm	200th NHL goal	February 28, 2008
Mark Stuart	100th NHL game	March 8, 2008

== Transactions ==
The Bruins have been involved in the following transactions during the 2007–08 season.

=== Trades ===
June 30, 2007	To Boston Bruins Manny Fernandez	To Minnesota Wild Petr Kalus; 4th-round pick in 2008
July 17, 2007	To Boston Bruins Peter Schaefer	To Ottawa Senators Shean Donovan
July 23, 2007	To St. Louis Blues Hannu Toivonen	To Boston Bruins Carl Soderberg
September 11, 2007	To Boston Bruins Petteri Nokelainen	To New York Islanders Ben Walter conditional 2nd-round pick in 2009 (Kevin Lynch)
September 24, 2007	To Anaheim Ducks Mark Mowers	To Boston Bruins Nathan Saunders; Brett Skinner
December 6, 2007	To Boston Bruins Alex Auld	To Phoenix Coyotes Nate DiCasmirro; 5th-round pick in 2009 (Jeff Costello)
January 2, 2008	To Anaheim Ducks Brandon Bochenski	To Boston Bruins Shane Hnidy; 6th-round pick in 2008 (Nicholas Tremblay)

=== Free agents ===
Player	Former team	Contract terms
Shawn Thornton	Anaheim Ducks	3 year, $1.55 million
Glen Metropolit*	St. Louis Blues	Undisclosed

*Invitee to Bruins Training Camp, re-signed after camp

Player	New team
Jay Leach	Tampa Bay Lightning
Joey MacDonald	New York Islanders

== Draft picks ==
Boston's picks at the 2007 NHL entry draft in Columbus, Ohio. The Bruins picked 8th overall, and the draft was held June 22–23.

Round	#	Player	Position	Nationality	College/junior/club team (league)
1	8	Zach Hamill	Center	Canada	Everett Silvertips (WHL)
2	35	Tommy Cross	Defenseman	United States	Westminster School (USHS-CT)
5	130	Denis Reul	Defenseman	Germany	Heilbronner Falken (Germany); Lewiston Maineiacs (QMJHL)
6	159	Alain Goulet	Defenseman	Canada	Aurora Tigers (OPJHL)
6	169	Radim Ostrcil	Defenseman	Czech Republic	HC Vsetín (Czech Republic)
7	189	Jordan Knackstedt	Right wing	Canada	Moose Jaw Warriors (WHL)

== Farm teams ==
=== Providence Bruins ===
The Providence Bruins remain Boston's top affiliate in the American Hockey League in 2007–08.

=== Johnstown Chiefs ===
On June 18, 2007, during the ECHL Board of Governors Annual Meeting, the Long Beach Ice Dogs membership in the ECHL was immediately terminated due to the Long Beach ownership group being unable to continue to operate in 2007–08. On September 18, 2007, the Johnstown Chiefs of the ECHL announced they had entered an affiliation agreement with the Bruins for the 2007–08 season.

== See also ==
- 2006–07 NHL season
