= 2007–08 Montreal Canadiens season =

NHL hockey team season

2007–08 Montreal Canadiens
- Northeast Division champions
- Division: 1st Northeast
- Conference: 1st Eastern
- 2007–08 record: 47–25–10
- Home record: 22–13–6
- Road record: 25–12–4
- Goals for: 262
- Goals against: 222

Team information
- General manager: Bob Gainey
- Coach: Guy Carbonneau
- Captain: Saku Koivu
- Alternate captains: Chris Higgins; Alexei Kovalev
- Arena: Bell Centre
- Average attendance: 21,273 (100.0%)

Team leaders
- Goals: Alexei Kovalev (35)
- Assists: Alexei Kovalev; Mark Streit (49)
- Points: Alexei Kovalev (84)
- Penalty minutes: Tom Kostopoulos (113)
- Plus/minus: Alexei Kovalev (+18)
- Wins: Carey Price (24)
- Goals against average: Jaroslav Halak (2.11)

The 2007–08 Montreal Canadiens season was the Canadiens' 99th season of play and 91st in the National Hockey League (NHL). The Canadiens defeated the Boston Bruins by four games to three in the Eastern Conference Quarter-final before being eliminated four games to one by the Philadelphia Flyers in the Conference Semi-final.

== Offseason events ==
Key dates prior to the start of the season:

- The 2007 NHL entry draft took place in Columbus, Ohio, on June 22–23.
- The free agency period began on July 1.

== Regular season ==
Although some media picked the Canadiens to not make the playoffs, the team surprised the league with a large improvement in its play. The club won the Northeast Division title and placed first in the Eastern Conference. It was the team's first divisional title since the 1991–92 season. The team had not placed first in the Conference since the 1988–89 season.

The Canadiens retired two jersey numbers during the season with pre-game ceremonies at the Bell Centre. On November 19, 2007, the number 19 of defenceman Larry Robinson, a former member of the Big Three, was retired. On February 23, 2008, the number 23 of forward Bob Gainey was retired.

The Canadiens finished the regular season leading the NHL in power-play goals scored (90) and power-play percentage (24.06%). They also tied the Florida Panthers for the fewest shorthanded goals allowed, with three.

=== Highlights ===
- On October 10, 2007, goaltender Carey Price made his NHL debut, leading the Canadiens to a 3–2 victory over the Pittsburgh Penguins.
- On January 11, 2008, defenceman Andrei Markov was named to the All-Star Game starting roster.
- On February 19, 2008, the Montreal Canadiens came back from a 0–5 deficit against the New York Rangers to win the game in a shootout 6–5. This marks the first time in the franchise's 99-year history that they have ever come back to win a game after going down 0–5. This game was compared to some of the greatest games in team history.
- On March 1, 2008, the Montreal Canadiens took first place in the Eastern Conference for the first time since 1993 with a 2–1 win over the New Jersey Devils.
- On March 22, 2008, the Montreal Canadiens won their 11th consecutive game against the Boston Bruins dating back to March 2007, besting their previous win streak over the Bruins of 10–0 from the 1956–57 NHL season.

== Standings ==
=== Final standings ===
Northeast Division
		GP	W	L	OTL	GF	GA	Pts
**1**	**Montreal Canadiens**	**82**	**47**	**25**	**10**	**262**	**222**	**104**
**2**	**Ottawa Senators**	**82**	**43**	**31**	**8**	**261**	**247**	**94**
**3**	**Boston Bruins**	**82**	**41**	**29**	**12**	**212**	**222**	**94**
4	Buffalo Sabres	82	39	31	12	255	242	90
5	Toronto Maple Leafs	82	36	35	11	231	260	83

==== Eastern Conference ====
Eastern Conference
R		Div	GP	W	L	OTL	GF	GA	Pts
**1**	**z – Montreal Canadiens**	**NE**	**82**	**47**	**25**	**10**	**262**	**222**	104
**2**	**y – Pittsburgh Penguins**	**AT**	**82**	**47**	**27**	**8**	**247**	**216**	102
**3**	**y – Washington Capitals**	**SE**	**82**	**43**	**31**	**8**	**242**	**231**	94
**4**	**New Jersey Devils**	**AT**	**82**	**46**	**29**	**7**	**206**	**197**	99
**5**	**New York Rangers**	**AT**	**82**	**42**	**27**	**13**	**213**	**199**	97
**6**	**Philadelphia Flyers**	**AT**	**82**	**42**	**29**	**11**	**248**	**233**	95
**7**	**Ottawa Senators**	**NE**	**82**	**43**	**31**	**8**	**261**	**247**	94
**8**	**Boston Bruins**	**NE**	**82**	**41**	**29**	**12**	**212**	**222**	94
8.5
9	Carolina Hurricanes	SE	82	43	33	6	252	249	92
10	Buffalo Sabres	NE	82	39	31	12	255	242	90
11	Florida Panthers	SE	82	38	35	9	216	226	85
12	Toronto Maple Leafs	NE	82	36	35	11	231	260	83
13	New York Islanders	AT	82	35	38	9	194	243	79
14	Atlanta Thrashers	SE	82	34	40	8	216	272	76
15	Tampa Bay Lightning	SE	82	31	42	9	223	267	71

Divisions: AT – Atlantic, NE – Northeast, SE – Southeast

bold – qualified for playoffs, y – division winner, z – placed first in conference (and division)

== Playoffs ==
The Montreal Canadiens clinched a playoff spot following a 7–5 victory against the Ottawa Senators on March 24, 2008, their 77th game of the season. They were the first team in the East to clinch a spot in the playoffs, won the Northeast Division and finished first in the Eastern Conference with 104 points, their highest total since the 1988–89 season.

=== Eastern Conference Quarterfinals: vs. (8) Boston Bruins ===
This was the 31st playoff meeting between these two Original Six rivals, with Montreal winning twenty-three of the thirty previous series. They last met in the 2004 Eastern Conference quarterfinals where Montreal won in seven games. Montreal won all eight games during this year's regular season series. The Canadiens held off Boston winning the series in seven games.

=== Eastern Conference Semifinals: vs. (6) Philadelphia Flyers ===
This was the fifth playoff meeting between these two teams, with Montreal winning three of the four previous series. They last met in the 1989 Prince of Wales Conference Final where Montreal won in six games. Montreal swept this year's four game regular season series. Despite this, the Flyers eliminated the Canadiens in five games.

== Schedule and results ==
=== Regular season ===
2007–08 regular season
October: 6–2–3 (home: 2–1–2; road: 4–1–1)

Game	Date	Visitor	Score	Home	OT	Decision	Attendance	Record	Points	Recap
1	October 3	Montreal	3–2	Carolina	OT	Huet	18,680	1–0–0	2	W
2	October 6	Montreal	3–4	Toronto	OT	Huet	19,476	1–0–1	3	OTL
3	October 10	Montreal	3–2	Pittsburgh		Price	17,006	2–0–1	5	W
4	October 13	Carolina	3–1	Montreal		Huet	21,273	2–1–1	5	L
5	October 16	Florida	2–1	Montreal	SO	Huet	21,273	2–1–2	6	OTL
6	October 18	Montreal	3–4	Ottawa		Price	20,019	2–2–2	6	L
7	October 20	Buffalo	2–4	Montreal		Huet	21,273	3–2–2	8	W
8	October 22	Boston	1–6	Montreal		Huet	21,273	4–2–2	10	W
9	October 26	Montreal	7–4	Carolina		Huet	16,796	5–2–2	12	W
10	October 27	Montreal	4–3	Pittsburgh	SO	Price	17,085	6–2–2	14	W
11	October 30	Atlanta	3–2	Montreal	SO	Price	21,273	6–2–3	15	OTL

November: 7–7–0 (home: 3–3–0; road: 4–4–0)

Game	Date	Visitor	Score	Home	OT	Decision	Attendance	Record	Points	Recap
12	November 1	Philadelphia	2–5	Montreal		Huet	21,273	7–2–3	17	W
13	November 3	Toronto	3–2	Montreal		Huet	21,273	7–3–3	17	L
14	November 5	Buffalo	0–2	Montreal		Huet	21,273	8–3–3	19	W
15	November 8	Montreal	2–1	Boston		Price	15,183	9–3–3	21	W
16	November 10	Montreal	1–3	Ottawa		Huet	20,065	9–4–3	21	L
17	November 13	Montreal	4–3	Toronto	OT	Price	19,595	10–4–3	23	W
18	November 16	Montreal	1–4	Buffalo		Huet	18,690	10–5–3	23	L
19	November 17	Boston	4–7	Montreal		Price	21,273	11–5–3	25	W
20	November 19	Ottawa	4–2	Montreal		Huet	21,273	11–6–3	25	L
21	November 21	Montreal	4–1	NY Islanders		Huet	13,153	12–6–3	27	W
22	November 23	Montreal	2–4	Buffalo		Price	18,690	12–7–3	27	L
23	November 24	Buffalo	3–0	Montreal		Huet	21,273	12–8–3	27	L
24	November 27	Montreal	4–3	Toronto	SO	Price	19,608	13–8–3	29	W
25	November 30	Montreal	0–4	New Jersey		Price	15,081	13–9–3	29	L

December: 6–4–4 (home: 1–3–2; road: 5–1–2)

Game	Date	Visitor	Score	Home	OT	Decision	Attendance	Record	Points	Recap
26	December 1	Nashville	5–4	Montreal	SO	Huet	21,273	13–9–4	30	OTL
27	December 4	Detroit	4–1	Montreal		Price	21,273	13–10–4	30	L
28	December 6	Montreal	4–2	Boston		Price	14,977	14–10–4	32	W
29	December 8	Carolina	5–1	Montreal		Price	21,273	14–11–4	32	L
30	December 11	Tampa Bay	3–2	Montreal	SO	Price	21,273	14–11–5	33	OTL
31	December 13	Montreal	4–1	Philadelphia		Price	19,322	15–11–5	35	W
32	December 15	Toronto	1–4	Montreal		Price	21,273	16–11–5	37	W
33	December 18	Florida	3–2	Montreal		Price	21,273	16–12–5	37	L
34	December 20	Montreal	5–2	Washington		Huet	12,670	17–12–5	39	W
35	December 22	Montreal	2–3	Atlanta	SO	Huet	17,153	17–12–6	40	OTL
36	December 23	Montreal	1–4	Dallas		Price	18,185	17–13–6	40	L
37	December 27	Montreal	5–2	Tampa Bay		Huet	20,294	18–13–6	42	W
38	December 28	Montreal	5–1	Florida		Huet	19,838	19–13–6	44	W
39	December 30	Montreal	3–4	NY Rangers	OT	Huet	18,200	19–13–7	45	OTL

January: 8–2–2 (home: 4–1–1; road: 4–1–1)

Game	Date	Visitor	Score	Home	OT	Decision	Attendance	Record	Points	Recap
40	January 3	Tampa Bay Lightning	3–6	Montreal		Huet	21,273	20–13–7	47	W
41	January 5	Washington Capitals	5–4	Montreal	OT	Price	21,273	20–13–8	48	OTL
42	January 8	Chicago Blackhawks	3–4	Montreal	OT	Huet	21,273	21–13–8	50	W
43	January 10	Montreal	5–2	Boston Bruins		Huet	17,565	22–13–8	52	W
44	January 12	Montreal	1–4	New York Rangers		Huet	18,200	22–14–8	52	L
45	January 15	Montreal	3–1	New York Islanders		Huet	11,439	23–14–8	54	W
46	January 17	Montreal	3–2	Atlanta Thrashers	SO	Huet	16,181	24–14–8	56	W
47	January 19	Pittsburgh Penguins	2–0	Montreal		Huet	21,273	24–15–8	56	L
48	January 22	Boston Bruins	2–8	Montreal		Huet	21,273	25–15–8	58	W
49	January 24	Montreal	4–3	New Jersey Devils		Huet	14,257	26–15–8	60	W
50	January 29	Washington Capitals	0–4	Montreal		Huet	21,273	27–15–8	62	W
51	January 31	Montreal	4–5	Washington Capitals	OT	Huet	14,930	27–15–9	63	OTL

February: 8–6–0 (home: 5–4–0; road: 3–2–0)

Game	Date	Visitor	Score	Home	OT	Decision	Attendance	Record	Points	Recap
52	February 2	New York Islanders	1–4	Montreal		Huet	21,273	28–15–9	65	W
53	February 3	New York Rangers	5–3	Montreal		Huet	21,273	28–16–9	65	L
54	February 5	Ottawa Senators	3–4	Montreal		Huet	21,273	29–16–9	67	W
55	February 7	Toronto Maple Leafs	4–2	Montreal		Price	21,273	29–17–9	67	L
56	February 9	Montreal	1–6	Ottawa Senators		Huet	20,292	29–18–9	67	L
57	February 12	Montreal	2–3	Tampa Bay Lightning		Huet	17,420	29–19–9	67	L
58	February 13	Montreal	2–1	Florida Panthers	OT	Price	17,100	30–19–9	69	W
59	February 16	Philadelphia Flyers	0–1	Montreal		Price	21,273	31–19–9	71	W
60	February 17	Montreal	5–3	Philadelphia Flyers		Price	19,611	32–19–9	73	W
61	February 19	New York Rangers	5–6	Montreal	SO	Huet	21,273	33–19–9	75	W
62	February 21	Pittsburgh Penguins	5–4	Montreal		Huet	21,273	33–20–9	75	L
63	February 23	Columbus Blue Jackets	3–0	Montreal		Price	21,273	33–21–9	75	L
64	February 26	Atlanta Thrashers	1–5	Montreal		Price	21,273	34–21–9	77	W
65	February 29	Montreal	6–2	Buffalo Sabres		Price	18,690	35–21–9	79	W

March: 9–4–1 (home: 5–1–1; road: 4–3–0)

Game	Date	Visitor	Score	Home	OT	Decision	Attendance	Record	Points	Recap
66	March 1	New Jersey Devils	1–2	Montreal		Price	21,273	36–21–9	81	W
67	March 3	Montreal	4–6	San Jose Sharks		Price	17,496	36–22–9	81	L
68	March 6	Montreal	4–2	Phoenix Coyotes		Price	14,841	37–22–9	83	W
69	March 8	Montreal	5–2	Los Angeles Kings		Halak	18,118	38–22–9	85	W
70	March 9	Montreal	1–3	Anaheim Ducks		Price	17,174	38–23–9	85	L
71	March 11	New Jersey Devils	0–4	Montreal		Price	21,273	39–23–9	87	W
72	March 13	Ottawa Senators	3–0	Montreal		Price	21,273	39–24–9	87	L
73	March 15	New York Islanders	0–3	Montreal		Halak	21,273	40–24–9	89	W
74	March 18	St. Louis Blues	4–3	Montreal	SO	Halak	21,273	40–24–10	90	OTL
75	March 20	Montreal	4–2	Boston Bruins		Price	17,565	41–24–10	92	W
76	March 22	Boston Bruins	2–3	Montreal	SO	Price	21,273	42–24–10	94	W
77	March 24	Ottawa Senators	5–7	Montreal		Price	21,273	43–24–10	96	W
78	March 28	Montreal	4–3	Buffalo Sabres	OT	Price	18,690	44–24–10	98	W
79	March 29	Montreal	2–4	Toronto Maple Leafs		Halak	19,584	44–25–10	98	L

April: 3–0–0 (home: 2–0–0; road: 1–0–0)

Game	Date	Visitor	Score	Home	OT	Decision	Attendance	Record	Points	Recap
80	April 1	Montreal	3–0	Ottawa Senators		Price	20,236	45–25–10	100	W
81	April 3	Buffalo Sabres	1–3	Montreal		Price	21,273	46–25–10	102	W
82	April 5	Toronto Maple Leafs	1–3	Montreal		Price	21,273	47–25–10	104	W

Legend: W Win (2 points) L Loss (0 points) OTL Overtime/shootout loss (1 point)

=== Playoffs ===
2008 Stanley Cup playoffs
Eastern Conference Quarterfinals vs. (8) Boston Bruins – Canadiens win 4–3

Game	Date	Arena	Visitor	Score	Home	OT	BOS goals	MTL goals	Decision	Attendance	Series	Recap
1	April 10	Bell Centre	Boston Bruins	1–4	Montreal		Hnidy	S. Kostitsyn, A. Kostitsyn, Smolinski, Kostopoulos	Price	21,273	Montreal leads 1–0	W
2	April 12	Bell Centre	Boston Bruins	2–3	Montreal	1OT	Schaefer, Krejci	Hamrlik, S. Kostitsyn, Kovalev	Price	21,273	Montreal leads 2–0	W
3	April 13	TD Banknorth Garden	Montreal	1–2	Boston Bruins	1OT	Lucic, Savard	Kostopoulos	Price	17,565	Montreal leads 2–1	L
4	April 15	TD Banknorth Garden	Montreal	1–0	Boston Bruins			Brisebois	Price	17,565	Montreal leads 3–1	W
5	April 17	Bell Centre	Boston Bruins	5–1	Montreal		Kessel, Metropolit, Chara, Sturm, Sobotka	Kovalev	Price	21,273	Montreal leads 3–2	L
6	April 19	TD Banknorth Garden	Montreal	4–5	Boston Bruins		Kessel, Sobotka, Lucic, Kessel, Sturm	Higgins, Plekanec, Bouillon, Higgins	Price	17,565	Series tied 3–3	L
7	April 21	Bell Centre	Boston Bruins	0–5	Montreal			Komisarek, Streit, A. Kostitsyn (2), S. Kostitsyn	Price	21,273	Montreal wins 4–3	W

Eastern Conference Semifinals vs. (6) Philadelphia Flyers – Flyers win 4–1

Game	Date	Arena	Visitor	Score	Home	OT	PHI goals	MTL goals	Decision	Attendance	Series	Recap
1	April 24	Bell Centre	Philadelphia Flyers	3–4	Montreal	1OT	Umberger, Dowd, Lupul	A. Kostitsyn, Kovalev (2), Kostopoulos	Price	21,273	Montreal leads 1–0	W
2	April 26	Bell Centre	Philadelphia Flyers	4–2	Montreal		Umberger (2), Carter, Briere	Koivu, Markov	Price	21,273	Series tied 1–1	L
3	April 28	Wachovia Center	Montreal	2–3	Philadelphia Flyers		Upshall, Richards, Umberger	Plekanec, Koivu	Price	19,849	Philadelphia leads 2–1	L
4	April 30	Wachovia Center	Montreal	2–4	Philadelphia Flyers		Umberger, Hartnell, Briere, Umberger	Plekanec, Koivu	Halak	19,872	Philadelphia leads 3–1	L
5	May 3	Bell Centre	Philadelphia Flyers	6–4	Montreal		Umberger, Richards, Umberger, Hartnell, Upshall, Knuble	Plekanec, Kovalev, Higgins, A. Kostitsyn	Price	21,273	Philadelphia wins 4–1	L

Legend: W Win L Loss

* Player scoring winning goal is shown in italics.

== Player statistics ==
Note:

Pos = Position;GP = Games played; G = Goals; A = Assists; Pts = Points; PIM = Penalty minutes; +/- = Plus/minus; PPG = Power-play goals; SHG = Short-handed goals; GWG = Game-winning goals
Pos = Position;GP = Games played; Min, TOI = Minutes played; W = Wins; L = Losses; T,T/OT = Ties; OTL = Overtime losses; GA = Goals-against; GAA = Goals-against average; SO = Shutouts; SA = Shots against; SV = Shots saved;SV% = Save percentage;

=== Skaters ===
Player	GP	G	A	Pts	+/-	PIM
Alexei Kovalev	82	35	49	84	18	70
Tomas Plekanec	81	29	40	69	15	42
Mark Streit	81	13	49	62	−6	28
Andrei Markov	82	16	42	58	1	63
Saku Koivu	77	16	40	56	−4	93
Andrei Kostitsyn	78	26	27	53	15	28
Chris Higgins	81	27	25	52	0	20
Michael Ryder	70	14	17	31	−4	30
Guillaume Latendresse	73	16	11	27	−2	41
Sergei Kostitsyn	52	9	18	27	9	51
Roman Hamrlik	77	5	21	26	7	38
Bryan Smolinski	64	8	17	25	−8	20
Maxim Lapierre	53	7	10	17	3	60
Michael Komisarek	75	4	13	17	9	101
Mathieu Dandenault	61	9	5	14	−11	34
Tom Kostopoulos	66	7	6	13	−3	113
Kyle Chipchura	36	4	7	11	−1	10
Patrice Brisebois	43	3	8	11	−2	26
Mikhail Grabovski	24	3	6	9	−4	8
Josh Gorges	63	0	9	9	0	32
Steve Begin	44	3	5	8	0	48
Francis Bouillon	74	2	6	8	9	61
Ryan O'Byrne	33	1	6	7	7	45
Carey Price (G)	41	0	2	2	0	0
Cristobal Huet (G)	39	0	1	1	0	0
Gregory Stewart	1	0	0	0	0	5
Matt D'Agostini	1	0	0	0	0	2
Corey Locke	1	0	0	0	−1	0
Garth Murray	1	0	0	0	0	0

- One winning goal in SO for Andrei Markov on October 27, 2007, vs Pittsburgh Penguins.
- Tom Kostopoulos was suspended for one game on November 19, 2007, vs Ottawa Senators for a fight in the last 5 minutes of the previous game vs Boston Bruins.
- Two winning goals in SO for Andrei Kostitsyn on November 27, 2007, vs Toronto Maple Leafs and on January 17, 2008, vs Atlanta Thrashers. On January 31, 2008, vs Washington Capitals, his brother Sergei and him became the first brothers to score a goal each in the same game with the Montreal Canadiens uniform since Peter and Frank Mahovlich in March 1974.
- Corey Locke was on the official lineup on December 30, 2007, vs New York Rangers but did not play.
- One penalty shot goal for Sergei Kostitsyn on February 3, 2008, vs New York Rangers.
- One winning goal in SO for Saku Koivu on February 19, 2008, vs New York Rangers.
- One winning goal in SO for Saku Koivu on March 22, 2008, vs Boston Bruins.

==== Goaltenders ====
Player	GP	TOI	W	L	OT	GA	SO	Sv%	SA	GAA
Carey Price	41	2414	24	12	3	103	3	.920	1282	2.56
Jaroslav Halak	6	285	2	1	1	10	1	.934	151	2.11
Cristobal Huet	39	2277	21	12	6	97	2	.916	1150	2.55
Combined	82	4976	47	25	10	210*	6	.919	2583	2.53

*The team has also allowed 6 game losing shootout goals and 6 empty net goals. These goals do not count towards a goalie's personal statistics.

=== Skaters ===
Player	GP	G	A	Pts	+/-	PIM
Alexei Kovalev	12	5	6	11	−4	8
Tomas Plekanec	12	4	5	9	−1	2
Saku Koivu	7	3	6	9	1	4
Andrei Kostitsyn	12	5	3	8	−4	2
Sergei Kostitsyn	12	3	5	8	5	14
Patrice Brisebois	10	1	5	6	−3	6
Chris Higgins	12	3	2	5	1	2
Tom Kostopoulos	12	3	1	4	−1	6
Mark Streit	11	1	3	4	−1	8
Andrei Markov	12	1	3	4	0	8
Mike Komisarek	12	1	2	3	3	18
Bryan Smolinski	12	1	2	3	1	2
Francis Bouillon	7	1	2	3	0	4
Roman Hamrlik	12	1	2	3	−3	8
Steve Begin	12	0	3	3	1	8
Josh Gorges	12	0	3	3	−2	0
Maxim Lapierre	12	0	3	3	−5	6
Guillaume Latendresse	8	0	1	1	−5	19
Michael Ryder	4	0	0	0	1	2
Ryan O'Byrne	4	0	0	0	−2	0
Mathieu Dandenault	9	0	0	0	−3	2
Carey Price (G)	11	0	0	0	0	2
Jaroslav Halak (G)	2	0	0	0	0	0

- One unsuccessfully penalty shot goal for Andrei Kostitsyn on April 24, 2008, vs Philadelphia Flyers.

==== Goaltenders ====
Player	GP	TOI	W	L	GA	SO	Sv%	SA	GAA
Carey Price	11	648	5	6	30	2	.901	305	2.78
Jaroslav Halak	2	76	0	0	3	0	.889	28	2.34
COMBINED	12	724	5	7	33	2	.900	333	2.70

*The team has also allowed 2 empty net goals. These goals do not count towards a goalie's personal statistics.

== Awards and records ==
=== Awards ===
==== Team awards ====
On April 5, following the final home game against the Toronto Maple Leafs, the team announced its award winners for the season.

Player	Award	Notes
Alexei Kovalev	Molson Cup	Awarded to the Most Valuable Player (MVP) and with the most "three stars" recognitions.
Mark Streit (2)	Jacques Beauchamp Trophy	Awarded by the Sports Writers Association of Montreal to a player for recognition of his outstanding achievement in the game of hockey.

==== National Hockey League awards ====
- Andrei Markov: All-Star starting defenceman

=== Records ===
- February 19 win against the New York Rangers was the largest comeback in franchise history after being down 0–5.

=== Milestones ===
Regular season
Player	Milestone	Reached
Roman Hamrlik	1,000th NHL career game	October 3, 2007
Carey Price	1st NHL career game 1st NHL career win	October 10, 2007
Kyle Chipchura	1st NHL career game	October 10, 2007
Kyle Chipchura	1st NHL career goal 1st NHL career point	October 20, 2007
Mikhail Grabovski	1st NHL career point	October 20, 2007
Bryan Smolinski	1,000th NHL career game	October 22, 2007
Mikhail Grabovski	1st NHL career goal	October 22, 2007
Alexei Kovalev	1,000th NHL career game 800th NHL career point	October 26, 2007
Alexei Kovalev	100th NHL power play career goal	November 17, 2007
Ryan O'Byrne	1st NHL career game 1st NHL career point	December 6, 2007
Sergei Kostitsyn	1st NHL career game	December 13, 2007
Sergei Kostitsyn	1st NHL career point	December 15, 2007
Mathieu Dandenault	800th NHL career game	December 20, 2007
Sergei Kostitsyn	1st NHL career goal	December 20, 2007
Saku Koivu	400th NHL career assist	January 3, 2008
Corey Locke	1st career NHL game	January 3, 2008
Francis Bouillon	400th NHL career game	January 22, 2008
Saku Koivu	700th NHL career game	January 31, 2008
Carey Price	1st NHL career assist 1st NHL career point	February 9, 2008
Carey Price	1st NHL career shutout	February 16, 2008
Ryan O'Byrne	1st NHL goal	March 3, 2008
Alexei Kovalev	500th NHL career assist	March 6, 2008
Patrice Brisebois	400th NHL career point	March 8, 2008
Matt D'Agostini	1st NHL career game	April 3, 2008
Gregory Stewart	1st NHL career game	April 5, 2008
Maxime Lapierre	100th NHL career game	April 5, 2008

Playoffs
Player	Milestone	Reached
Mike Komisarek	1st NHL career playoff assist 1st NHL career playoff point	April 10, 2008
Andrei Kostitsyn	1st NHL career playoff game 1st NHL career playoff goal 1st NHL career playoff point	April 10, 2008
Sergei Kostitsyn	1st NHL career playoff game 1st NHL career playoff goal 1st NHL career playoff point	April 10, 2008
Tom Kostopoulos	1st NHL career playoff game 1st NHL career playoff goal 1st NHL career playoff assist 1st NHL career playoff point	April 10, 2008
Maxim Lapierre	1st NHL career playoff game 1st NHL career playoff assist 1st NHL career playoff point	April 10, 2008
Guillaume Latendresse	1st NHL career playoff game	April 10, 2008
Carey Price	1st NHL career playoff game 1st NHL career playoff win	April 10, 2008
Mark Streit	1st NHL career playoff assist 1st NHL career playoff point	April 10, 2008
Andrei Kostitsyn	1st NHL career playoff assist	April 15, 2008
Ryan O'Byrne	1st NHL career playoff game	April 15, 2008
Carey Price	1st NHL career playoff shutout	April 15, 2008
Sergei Kostitsyn	1st NHL career playoff assist	April 19, 2008
Tomas Plekanec	1st NHL career playoff goal	April 19, 2008
Mike Komisarek	1st NHL career playoff goal	April 21, 2008
Mark Streit	1st NHL career playoff goal	April 21, 2008
Jaroslav Halak	1st NHL career playoff game	April 28, 2008
Guillaume Latendresse	1st NHL career playoff assist 1st NHL career playoff point	April 28, 2008

== Transactions ==
The Canadiens have been involved in the following transactions during the 2007–08 season.

=== Trades ===
June 16, 2007	To Chicago Blackhawks Sergei Samsonov	To Montreal Canadiens Jassen Cullimore; Tony Salmelainen
June 23, 2007	To Carolina Hurricanes Michael Leighton	To Montreal Canadiens 192nd overall pick in 2007
November 15, 2007	To Florida Panthers Garth Murray	To Montreal Canadiens Claimed off waivers
February 8, 2008	To Detroit Red Wings Francis Lemieux	To Montreal Canadiens Brett Engelhardt
February 18, 2008	To Phoenix Coyotes Cory Urquhart	To Montreal Canadiens Olivier Latendresse
February 26, 2008	To Washington Capitals Cristobal Huet	To Montreal Canadiens 2nd-round pick in 2009

=== Free agents ===
==== Free agent acquisitions ====
Player	Former team	Contract terms
Roman Hamrlik	Calgary Flames	4 years, $22 million
Bryan Smolinski	Vancouver Canucks	1 year, $2 million
Tom Kostopoulos	Los Angeles Kings	2 years, $1.8 million
Jamie Rivers	St. Louis Blues	1 year, $525,000
Patrice Brisebois	Colorado Avalanche	1 year, $700,000
Brock Trotter	University of Denver	3 years, minor league contract

==== Players lost to free agency ====
Player	New team
Radek Bonk	Nashville Predators
Dan Jancevski	Tampa Bay Lightning
Sheldon Souray	Edmonton Oilers
David Aebischer	Phoenix Coyotes
Mike Johnson	St. Louis Blues
Janne Niinimaa	HC Davos

== Draft picks ==
Montreal's picks at the 2007 NHL entry draft in Columbus, Ohio.

Round	#	Player	Position	Nationality	College/junior/club team (league)
1	12	Ryan McDonagh	Defence	United States	Cretin-Derham Hall (USHS-MN)
1	22	Max Pacioretty	Left wing	United States	Sioux City Musketeers (USHL)
2	43	P. K. Subban	Defence	Canada	Belleville Bulls (OHL)
3	65	Olivier Fortier	Centre	Canada	Rimouski Océanic (QMJHL)
3	73	Yannick Weber	Defence	Switzerland	Kitchener Rangers (OHL)
5	133	Joe Stejskal	Defence	United States	Grand Rapids High School (USHS-MN)
5	142	Andrew Conboy	Left wing	United States	Omaha Lancers (USHL)
6	163	Nichlas Torp	Defence	Sweden	HV71 (Elitserien)
7	192	Scott Kishel	Defence	United States	Virginia High School (USHS-MN)

== Farm teams ==
=== Hamilton Bulldogs ===
The Hamilton Bulldogs remain Montreal's top affiliate in the American Hockey League in 2007–08.

=== Cincinnati Cyclones ===
Montreal has a joint affiliation with the Nashville Predators for the Cincinnati Cyclones of the ECHL in 2007–08.

== See also ==
- 2007–08 NHL season
