= 2007–08 Ottawa Senators season =

National Hockey League team 16th season

2007–08 Ottawa Senators
- Division: 2nd Northeast
- Conference: 7th Eastern
- 2007–08 record: 43–31–8
- Home record: 22–15–4
- Road record: 21–16–4
- Goals for: 261
- Goals against: 247

Team information
- General manager: Bryan Murray
- Coach: John Paddock (Oct.–Feb.); Bryan Murray (interim, Feb.–Apr.)
- Captain: Daniel Alfredsson
- Alternate captains: Chris Phillips; Wade Redden
- Arena: Scotiabank Place
- Average attendance: 19,821

Team leaders
- Goals: Dany Heatley (41)
- Assists: Jason Spezza (58)
- Points: Jason Spezza (92)
- Penalty minutes: Chris Neil (199)
- Plus/minus: Dany Heatley (+33)
- Wins: Martin Gerber (30)
- Goals against average: Martin Gerber (2.72)

The 2007–08 Ottawa Senators season was the 16th season of the Ottawa Senators of the National Hockey League (NHL). The Senators started strongly in the regular season, but the team slumped after Christmas, and just barely qualified for the playoffs. The slump caused the Senators to fire John Paddock, who was in his first season as head coach. The Senators lost in the first round, losing in a sweep by the Pittsburgh Penguins.

== Offseason ==
The 2007 NHL entry draft was held in Columbus, Ohio, on June 22–23, and the Senators used their first-round draft pick, 29th overall, to select Jim O'Brien.

Prior to the season, the Senators changed their staff, promoting Bryan Murray to general manager and John Paddock to head coach. Previous General Manager John Muckler did not accept another position with the Senators and resigned. Two players, Mike Comrie and Tom Preissing, left as free agents, and Peter Schaefer was traded to the Boston Bruins in exchange for Shean Donovan.

== Pre-season ==
In the pre-season, a major incident occurred in the game against the Philadelphia Flyers on September 25. Early in the second period, forward Dean McAmmond was hit in the head by Steve Downie of the Flyers. Downie was given a match penalty with an automatic suspension. McAmmond was diagnosed with a concussion. Four Flyers players were eventually injured in the match, which was won by the Senators by two goals. Steve Downie was eventually suspended for 20 games for the hit, also adding a nine-game suspension from the NHL's affiliate, the American Hockey League (AHL). The Senators won all seven of their pre-season games, the only NHL team to do so that year.

== Regular season ==
The Senators opened the regular season with two straight wins over their rivals, the Toronto Maple Leafs, in the Battle of Ontario. The season opener at Toronto ended in overtime with right winger Dany Heatley notching two goals and an assist to start the season off 1–0–0. That afternoon, Heatley also agreed to a new contract, a six-year, $45 million deal. The Senators earned another win the following day in their home opener, with captain Daniel Alfredsson scoring two goals. Before the game, the 2007 Eastern Conference Champions banner was raised to the rafters of Scotiabank Place.

The Sens went undefeated to start the season until the streak was snapped in their sixth game with a 5–3 loss to the Carolina Hurricanes on October 11. In a later win against the Montreal Canadiens, rookie Nick Foligno scored his first NHL goal off a wrap-around attempt on goaltender Carey Price. He celebrated the goal by imitating his father Mike's signature goal celebration, a high jump.

After an 8–1 record to start the season, and with a one-week break, Head Coach John Paddock organized a team retreat to the Muskoka, Ontario, area starting on October 21. With their win over the Maple Leafs on November 6, the Senators set a team record by recording their eighth consecutive win. They also set an NHL record for the best start to a season after 14 games.

Also on November 6, six Senators were named to the All-Star Game ballot: Daniel Alfredsson, Ray Emery, Dany Heatley, Chris Phillips, Wade Redden and Jason Spezza, the most players from any one team in the NHL. As of December 5, Daniel Alfredsson trailed only Sidney Crosby in the Eastern Conference voting for forwards with 119,825 votes.

After a 4–2 win against Montreal, the Senators entered into a seven–game losing skid (0–4–3), recording three points and matching a record for straight losses set in the 1995–96 season. The Senators then rebounded with a six–game winning streak.

On January 2, 2008, Head Coach Paddock was named to coach the Eastern Conference All-Star team and Jason Spezza was named the NHL's First Star of the Month for December. On January 8, Daniel Alfredsson was named to the starting lineup for the All-Star Game, based on fan voting. He is the first Senator ever to be voted to the starting lineup. Alfredsson will be making his fifth appearance in the All-Star Game.

On January 11, Alfredsson's "CASH line" linemates, Dany Heatley and Jason Spezza, were named to the All-Star Game roster. They are the first complete line named since 1981, when the "Triple Crown" line of the Los Angeles Kings was named. However, due to Heatley's shoulder injury suffered against the Detroit Red Wings earlier in January, he did not dress in the game.

On January 24, 2008, in a game against the Tampa Bay Lightning, Daniel Alfredsson set a new team record for points in a single game, notching seven points on three goals and four assists. This topped the team record of six, done three times, the last time by Alfredsson himself against the Buffalo Sabres on November 2, 2005. A six-point game had also been done by Dan Quinn and Radek Bonk. The seven-point night put Alfredsson into the overall lead in the scoring race for the All-Star break. Moreover, Alfredsson was named the First Star of the Week on January 28. He was also named The Hockey News Player of the Week on that same day.

On January 28, Ray Emery arrived late for a practice in New York City on the first day back after the All-Star Game. Emery was subsequently fined $15,000 and the money was donated to the Children's Hospital of Eastern Ontario Foundation. Despite his team's disappointment with his behaviour, it did not stop Emery starting against the Maple Leafs in a nationally televised game, following Coach Paddock's "lose and you're out" policy of rotating his goaltenders depending on the team winning or losing, and not the goaltender's performance.

Dany Heatley returned from his separated shoulder injury after a month on injured reserve on February 7, 2008, scoring two goals in a win against the Florida Panthers.

On February 8, 2008, The Sports Network (TSN) reported that Wade Redden refused to waive his no-trade clause for a possible deal with the San Jose Sharks. Redden's agent was quoted as saying that "Redden wants to stay in Ottawa and contribute to Ottawa winning the Stanley Cup."

On February 11, the Senators made a trade with the Carolina Hurricanes sending defenceman Joe Corvo and forward Patrick Eaves in exchange for forward Cory Stillman and defenceman Mike Commodore in a trade for "Stanley Cup experience", according to General Manager Bryan Murray. Also that day, the NHL announced that Jason Spezza was named First Star of the Week after recording 11 points in the previous week's three games.

On February 27, after a prolonged slump through January and February during which the Senators won only 7 of 21 games, Murray fired Head Coach Paddock and Assistant Coach Ron Low, taking over the coaching duties himself. Both Low and Paddock were offered other jobs within the organization. Murray said he told them to call him in a few weeks.

The Senators trailed the Buffalo Sabres 3–1 on March 25, 2008, with under eight minutes to play in the third period but scored five unanswered goals to win 6–3. It was only the third time in NHL history that a team scored six-or-more goals in a game despite scoring no more than one goal through the first 52:00.

The team remained upbeat after the poor play and coaching change. Alfredsson appeared on the cover of the April 1 issue of The Hockey News, proclaiming "Don't Count Us Out." This was his seventh appearance on the cover of the magazine. The article interviewed Alfredsson, Fisher and Murray, and discussed the up-and-down play of the team, and its defensive play which has allowed more goals than previous seasons. Wayne Gretzky was quoted about the team: "This might mature them as a team going through this tough patch."

Entering the final week of play, the Senators needed three points in three games to guarantee a playoff position ahead of the Washington Capitals, who held an edge in a tie-breaker between the teams. In the first game, Montreal would defeat the Senators 3–0. According to The Globe and Mail, before the next game on April 3 in Toronto, Ottawa employed the use of sports psychologist Dr. Max Offenberger. The Senators defeated the Maple Leafs 8–2 and Antoine Vermette scored a hat-trick. Three of the Senators' goals were scored short-handed; it was the third time in franchise history that the Senators had scored three short-handed goals in a single game, with the two previous games being a 5–2 home win against the Florida Panthers on November 18, 2000, and a 7–2 road win over the Pittsburgh Penguins on February 2, 2006. However, they lost Alfredsson and Fisher to injuries, adding to Chris Kelly, who was already sidelined. The Capitals continued to win, and it came down to the Senators final game, on April 4 at home against the Boston Bruins, needing one point to clinch a spot. Despite a 2–1 Senators' loss that night, the Carolina Hurricanes fell to the Florida Panthers and the Senators clinched a playoff berth for the 11th-straight season.

On April 6, the final day of the season, the Pittsburgh Penguins played the Philadelphia Flyers to decide the final seedings and lost 2–0, drawing the Senators as first round opponents. According to Phil Sheridan of The Philadelphia Inquirer, it appeared deliberate:

"Two days after Double Clinch Friday came Letdown Sunday. Fans who filled the Wachovia Center expecting a fresh installment of There Will Be Blood got stuck watching Farce of the Penguins instead.

No Sidney Crosby, not much effort. The Pittsburgh Penguins paid the Flyers a huge compliment yesterday. They made it embarrassingly clear that they preferred to face the Ottawa Senators in the first round of the playoffs. After skating through the motions of a 2–0 loss to Philadelphia, the Pens will indeed face the Sens."

Excluding three shootout-winning goals, the Senators scored 258 goals during the regular season, the most among all 30 teams. They also scored the most shorthanded goals, with 18.

=== Divisional standings ===
Northeast Division
		GP	W	L	OTL	GF	GA	Pts
**1**	**Montreal Canadiens**	**82**	**47**	**25**	**10**	**262**	**222**	**104**
**2**	**Ottawa Senators**	**82**	**43**	**31**	**8**	**261**	**247**	**94**
**3**	**Boston Bruins**	**82**	**41**	**29**	**12**	**212**	**222**	**94**
4	Buffalo Sabres	82	39	31	12	255	242	90
5	Toronto Maple Leafs	82	36	35	11	231	260	83

=== Conference standings ===
Eastern Conference
R		Div	GP	W	L	OTL	GF	GA	Pts
**1**	**z – Montreal Canadiens**	**NE**	**82**	**47**	**25**	**10**	**262**	**222**	104
**2**	**y – Pittsburgh Penguins**	**AT**	**82**	**47**	**27**	**8**	**247**	**216**	102
**3**	**y – Washington Capitals**	**SE**	**82**	**43**	**31**	**8**	**242**	**231**	94
**4**	**New Jersey Devils**	**AT**	**82**	**46**	**29**	**7**	**206**	**197**	99
**5**	**New York Rangers**	**AT**	**82**	**42**	**27**	**13**	**213**	**199**	97
**6**	**Philadelphia Flyers**	**AT**	**82**	**42**	**29**	**11**	**248**	**233**	95
**7**	**Ottawa Senators**	**NE**	**82**	**43**	**31**	**8**	**261**	**247**	94
**8**	**Boston Bruins**	**NE**	**82**	**41**	**29**	**12**	**212**	**222**	94
8.5
9	Carolina Hurricanes	SE	82	43	33	6	252	249	92
10	Buffalo Sabres	NE	82	39	31	12	255	242	90
11	Florida Panthers	SE	82	38	35	9	216	226	85
12	Toronto Maple Leafs	NE	82	36	35	11	231	260	83
13	New York Islanders	AT	82	35	38	9	194	243	79
14	Atlanta Thrashers	SE	82	34	40	8	216	272	76
15	Tampa Bay Lightning	SE	82	31	42	9	223	267	71

Divisions: AT – Atlantic, NE – Northeast, SE – Southeast

bold – qualified for playoffs, y – division winner, z – placed first in conference (and division)

== Playoffs ==
The Ottawa Senators clinched a playoff spot for the eleventh consecutive time (minus the lockout), finishing second in the Northeast Division, and seventh in the Eastern Conference. The Senators faced the Pittsburgh Penguins in the Eastern Conference Quarter-final and lost the series 4–0. The result led to speculation in the media that Ray Emery's contract would be bought out and free agents Mike Commodore, Martin Lapointe, Wade Redden, Luke Richardson and Cory Stillman would not return for the 2008–09 season. GM Bryan Murray was given a public endorsement by Owner Eugene Melnyk and was expected to return for next season. On April 18, Murray confirmed to the media in an end-of-season press conference that Emery would not return: "My plan is not to have him back."

== Schedule and results ==
=== Regular season ===
2007–08 regular season
October: 9–1–0 (home: 5–1–0; road: 4–0–0)

Game	Date	Road	Score	Home	OT	Decision	Attendance	Record	Points	Recap
1	October 3	Ottawa	4 – 3	Toronto	OT	Gerber	19,476	1–0–0	2	W
2	October 4	Toronto	2 – 3	Ottawa		Gerber	19,857	2–0–0	4	W
3	October 6	NY Rangers	0 – 2	Ottawa		Gerber	19,336	3–0–0	6	W
4	October 8	New Jersey	2 – 4	Ottawa		Gerber	18,260	4–0–0	8	W
5	October 10	Ottawa	3 – 1	Atlanta		Elliott	12,751	5–0–0	10	W
6	October 11	Carolina	5 – 3	Ottawa		Gerber	18,268	5–1–0	10	L
7	October 13	Ottawa	3 – 1	NY Rangers		Gerber	18,200	6–1–0	12	W
8	October 18	Montreal	3 – 4	Ottawa		Gerber	20,019	7–1–0	14	W
9	October 20	Florida	1 – 4	Ottawa		Emery	19,904	8–1–0	16	W
10	October 27	Ottawa	4 – 1	New Jersey		Gerber	17,625	9–1–0	18	W

November: 7–5–2 (home: 5–3–1; road: 2–2–1)

Game	Date	Road	Score	Home	OT	Decision	Attendance	Record	Points	Recap
11	November 1	Atlanta	4 – 6	Ottawa		Emery	18,538	10–1–0	20	W
12	November 3	Boston	2 – 3	Ottawa		Gerber	19,939	11–1–0	22	W
13	November 4	Ottawa	2 – 1	Boston	SO	Gerber	10,087	12–1–0	24	W
14	November 6	Toronto	1 – 5	Ottawa		Gerber	19,613	13–1–0	26	W
15	November 8	Washington	4 – 1	Ottawa		Emery	19,666	13–2–0	26	L
16	November 10	Montreal	1 – 3	Ottawa		Gerber	20,065	14–2–0	28	W
17	November 15	Buffalo	2 – 3	Ottawa		Gerber	19,279	15–2–0	30	W
18	November 17	Ottawa	0 – 3	Toronto		Gerber	19,596	15–3–0	30	L
19	November 19	Ottawa	4 – 2	Montreal		Gerber	21,273	16–3–0	32	W
20	November 21	Ottawa	2 – 4	Buffalo		Emery	18,690	16–4–0	32	L
21	November 22	Pittsburgh	6 – 5	Ottawa	SO	Gerber	20,061	16–4–1	33	OTL
22	November 24	Philadelphia	4 – 3	Ottawa		Emery	20,128	16–5–1	33	L
23	November 28	Ottawa	2 – 3	NY Islanders	SO	Emery	9,211	16–5–2	34	OTL
24	November 29	Nashville	6 – 5	Ottawa		Gerber	19,538	16–6–2	34	L

December: 9–3–2 (home: 2–2–1; road: 7–1–1)

Game	Date	Road	Score	Home	OT	Decision	Attendance	Record	Points	Recap
25	December 1	NY Rangers	5 – 2	Ottawa		Gerber	20,003	16–7–2	34	L
26	December 4	Ottawa	3 – 4	Tampa Bay	SO	Emery	17,540	16–7–3	35	OTL
27	December 5	Ottawa	5 – 4	Florida		Emery	11,289	17–7–3	37	W
28	December 7	Ottawa	4 – 2	Dallas		Emery	18,016	18–7–3	39	W
29	December 12	Ottawa	6 – 0	Carolina		Emery	15,268	19–7–3	41	W
30	December 13	Ottawa	4 – 1	Pittsburgh		Gerber	16,982	20–7–3	43	W
31	December 15	Atlanta	3 – 7	Ottawa		Gerber	20,082	21–7–3	45	W
32	December 18	Ottawa	3 – 2	Boston		Gerber	14,874	22–7–3	47	W
33	December 20	Ottawa	2 – 3	Atlanta		Gerber	14,085	22–8–3	47	L
34	December 22	Chicago	4 – 3	Ottawa	OT	Emery	20,171	22–8–4	48	OTL
35	December 23	Ottawa	3 – 1	NY Rangers		Gerber	18,200	23–8–4	50	W
36	December 26	Ottawa	5 – 3	Buffalo		Gerber	18,690	24–8–4	52	W
37	December 27	NY Islanders	2 – 5	Ottawa		Gerber	20,268	25–8–4	54	W
38	December 29	Washington	8 – 6	Ottawa		Gerber	20,296	25–9–4	54	L
^1Emery had to leave this game with a sore hip at the 5:24 mark of the 1st period, but was credited with the win because he was in the net when the game-winning goal was scored. Neither Gerber or Emery will get the shutout included in their stats because it was shared.

January: 7–7–0 (home: 4–3–0; road: 3–4–0)

Game	Date	Road	Score	Home	OT	Decision	Attendance	Record	Points	Recap
39	January 1	Ottawa	3 – 6	Washington		Emery	14,547	25–10–4	54	L
40	January 4	Ottawa	5 – 3	Buffalo		Emery	18,690	26–10–4	56	W
41	January 5	Tampa Bay	3 – 4	Ottawa	OT	Emery	20,108	27–10–4	58	W
42	January 10	Buffalo	2 – 3	Ottawa	SO	Gerber	19,843	28–10–4	60	W
43	January 12	Detroit	2 – 3	Ottawa		Emery	20,208	29–10–4	62	W
44	January 13	NY Islanders	3 – 1	Ottawa		Gerber	19,804	29–11–4	62	L
45	January 15	Ottawa	2 – 4	Washington		Emery	15,261	29–12–4	62	L
46	January 17	Carolina	1 – 5	Ottawa		Gerber	19,720	30–12–4	64	W
47	January 19	Tampa Bay	2 – 0	Ottawa		Emery	20,091	30–13–4	64	L
48	January 20	Ottawa	1 – 6	Philadelphia		Gerber	19,742	30–14–4	64	L
49	January 22	Ottawa	3 – 5	Florida		Emery	12,794	30–15–4	64	L
50	January 24	Ottawa	8 – 4	Tampa Bay		Gerber	16,346	31–15–4	66	W
51	January 29	Ottawa	5 – 2	NY Islanders		Gerber	9,546	32–15–4	68	W
52	January 31	Boston	4 – 1	Ottawa		Gerber	19,959	32–16–4	68	L

February: 4–7–2 (home: 3–3–1; road: 1–4–1)

Game	Date	Road	Score	Home	OT	Decision	Attendance	Record	Points	Recap
53	February 2	Ottawa	2 – 4	Toronto		Emery	19,543	32–17–4	68	L
54	February 5	Ottawa	3 – 4	Montreal		Gerber	21,273	32–18–4	68	L
55	February 7	Florida	4 – 5	Ottawa		Emery	19,435	33–18–4	70	W
56	February 9	Montreal	1 – 6	Ottawa		Emery	20,297	34–18–4	72	W
57	February 12	Buffalo	5 – 1	Ottawa		Emery	19,564	34–19–4	72	L
58	February 13	Ottawa	2 – 3	New Jersey	OT	Gerber	12,339	34–19–5	73	OTL
59	February 16	New Jersey	3 – 2	Ottawa		Emery	20,201	34–20–5	73	L
60	February 19	Philadelphia	2 – 3	Ottawa	SO	Emery	19,729	35–20–5	75	W
61	February 21	Columbus	3 – 2	Ottawa	SO	Emery	19,612	35–20–6	76	OTL
62	February 23	Ottawa	4 – 3	Pittsburgh	OT	Emery	17,132	36–20–6	78	W
63	February 25	Toronto	5 – 0	Ottawa		Emery	19,861	36–21–6	78	L
64	February 26	Ottawa	0 – 4	Boston		Gerber	13,451	36–22–6	78	L
65	February 28	Ottawa	1 – 3	Philadelphia		Emery	19,567	36–23–6	78	L

March: 6–6–2 (home: 3–1–1; road: 3–5–1)

Game	Date	Road	Score	Home	OT	Decision	Attendance	Record	Points	Recap
66	March 1	Pittsburgh	4 – 5	Ottawa		Gerber	20,153	37–23–6	80	W
67	March 3	Ottawa	1 – 3	Anaheim		Gerber	17,174	37–24–6	80	L
68	March 5	Ottawa	2 – 3	San Jose	OT	Gerber	17,496	37–24–7	81	OTL
69	March 6	Ottawa	0 – 2	Los Angeles		Gerber	17,580	37–25–7	81	L
70	March 8	Ottawa	4 – 2	Phoenix		Gerber	16,922	38–25–7	83	W
71	March 11	Boston	1 – 4	Ottawa		Gerber	20,143	39–25–7	85	W
72	March 13	Ottawa	3 – 0	Montreal		Gerber	21,273	40–25–7	87	W
73	March 16	Ottawa	1 – 5	Carolina		Gerber	18,680	40–26–7	87	L
74	March 20	St. Louis	2 – 3	Ottawa		Gerber	20,027	41–26–7	89	W
75	March 22	Toronto	5 – 4	Ottawa		Gerber	20,183	41–27–7	89	L
76	March 24	Ottawa	5 – 7	Montreal		Emery	21,273	41–28–7	89	L
77	March 25	Ottawa	6 – 3	Buffalo		Gerber	18,690	42–28–7	91	W
78	March 27	Buffalo	4 – 3	Ottawa	SO	Gerber	19,883	42–28–8	92	OTL
79	March 29	Ottawa	0 – 4	Boston		Gerber	17,565	42–29–8	92	L

April: 1–2–0 (home: 0–2–0; road: 1–0–0)

Game	Date	Road	Score	Home	OT	Decision	Attendance	Record	Points	Recap
80	April 1	Montreal	3 – 0	Ottawa		Gerber	20,326	42–30–8	92	L
81	April 3	Ottawa	8 – 2	Toronto		Gerber	19,466	43-30-8	94	W
82	April 4	Boston	2 – 1	Ottawa		Gerber	20,232	43-31-8	94	L

Legend: W Win (2 points) L Loss (0 points) OTL Overtime/shootout loss (1 point)

=== Playoffs ===
2008 Stanley Cup playoffs
Eastern Conference Quarterfinals vs. (2) Pittsburgh Penguins – Penguins win 4–0

Game	Date	Visitor	Score	Home	OT	Decision	Attendance	Series	Recap
1	April 9	Ottawa	0 – 4	Pittsburgh		Gerber	17,132	Penguins lead 1–0	L
2	April 11	Ottawa	3 – 5	Pittsburgh		Gerber	17,132	Penguins lead 2–0	L
3	April 14	Pittsburgh	4 – 1	Ottawa		Gerber	19,961	Penguins lead 3–0	L
4	April 16	Pittsburgh	3 – 1	Ottawa		Gerber	19,954	Penguins win series 4–0	L

Legend: W Win L Loss

== Player statistics ==
=== Regular season ===
Scoring

Player	Pos	GP	G	A	Pts	PIM	+/-	PPG	SHG	GWG
Jason Spezza	C	76	34	58	92	66	26	11	0	6
Daniel Alfredsson	RW	70	40	49	89	34	15	9	7	5
Dany Heatley	LW	71	41	41	82	76	33	13	0	8
Antoine Vermette	C	81	24	29	53	51	3	4	3	3
Mike Fisher	C	79	23	24	47	82	-10	6	2	4
Wade Redden	D	80	6	32	38	60	11	4	0	1
Andrej Meszaros	D	82	9	27	36	50	5	6	1	1
Chris Kelly	C/LW	75	11	19	30	30	3	0	1	1
Randy Robitaille	C	68	10	19	29	18	4	1	0	1
Joe Corvo	D	51	6	21	27	18	13	1	0	1
Christoph Schubert	D	82	8	16	24	64	7	1	0	0
Dean McAmmond	C	68	9	13	22	12	1	0	3	1
Chris Neil	RW	68	6	14	20	199	-3	0	0	1
Cory Stillman	LW	24	3	16	19	10	-8	1	0	0
Chris Phillips	D	81	5	13	18	56	15	1	0	1
Anton Volchenkov	D	67	1	14	15	55	14	0	0	1
Shean Donovan	RW	82	5	7	12	73	-3	0	0	3
Patrick Eaves	RW	26	4	6	10	6	0	1	0	1
Nick Foligno	LW	45	6	3	9	20	0	0	0	0
Luke Richardson	D	76	2	7	9	41	1	0	0	0
Martin Lapointe	RW	18	3	3	6	23	-2	1	0	0
Cody Bass	C	21	2	2	4	19	-1	0	1	1
Brian McGrattan	RW	38	0	3	3	46	0	0	0	0
Mike Commodore	D	26	0	2	2	26	-9	0	0	0
Martin Gerber	G	57	0	2	2	6	0	0	0	0
Brian Lee	D	6	0	1	1	4	1	0	0	0
Brian Elliott	G	1	0	0	0	0	0	0	0	0
Ray Emery	G	31	0	0	0	6	0	0	0	0
Josh Hennessy	C	5	0	0	0	0	-1	0	0	0
Alexander Nikulin	C	2	0	0	0	0	-2	0	0	0
Lawrence Nycholat	D	3	0	0	0	0	1	0	0	0
Jesse Winchester	C	1	0	0	0	2	0	0	0	0
Ilya Zubov	C	1	0	0	0	0	0	0	0	0

Stillman and Commodore totals only include time with Senators.

Goaltending

Player	MIN	GP	W	L	T/OT	GA	GAA	SO	SA	SV	SV%
Martin Gerber	3197	57	30	18	4	145	2.72	2	1619	1474	.910
Ray Emery	1689	31	12	13	4	88	3.13	0	800	712	.890
Brian Elliott	60	1	1	0	0	1	1.00	0	29	28	.966
Team:	4946	82	43	31	8	234	2.84	2	2448	2214	.904

=== Playoffs ===
Scoring

Player	Pos	GP	G	A	Pts	PIM	+/-	PPG	SHG	GWG
Cory Stillman	LW	4	2	0	2	2	-4	1	0	0
Mike Commodore	D	4	0	2	2	0	-1	0	0	0
Cody Bass	C	4	1	0	1	6	0	0	0	0
Shean Donovan	RW	4	1	0	1	2	-1	0	0	0
Nick Foligno	LW	4	1	0	1	2	0	0	0	0
Dany Heatley	LW	4	0	1	1	6	-5	0	0	0
Andrej Meszaros	D	4	0	1	1	6	-4	0	0	0
Chris Neil	RW	4	0	1	1	22	0	0	0	0
Wade Redden	D	4	0	1	1	11	-4	0	0	0
Randy Robitaille	C	2	0	1	1	0	1	0	0	0
Jason Spezza	C	4	0	1	1	0	-4	0	0	0
Anton Volchenkov	D	4	0	1	1	2	0	0	0	0
Daniel Alfredsson	RW	2	0	0	0	0	-2	0	0	0
Martin Gerber	G	4	0	0	0	0	0	0	0	0
Martin Lapointe	RW	4	0	0	0	4	-1	0	0	0
Brian Lee	D	4	0	0	0	2	-1	0	0	0
Dean McAmmond	C	4	0	0	0	4	0	0	0	0
Chris Phillips	D	4	0	0	0	4	-2	0	0	0
Christoph Schubert	D	4	0	0	0	8	0	0	0	0
Antoine Vermette	C	4	0	0	0	4	-4	0	0	0

Goaltending

Player	MIN	GP	W	L	GA	GAA	SO	SA	SV	SV%
Martin Gerber	238	4	0	4	14	3.53	0	159	145	.912
Team:	238	4	0	4	14	3.53	0	159	145	.912

Note:

Pos = Position;GP = Games played; G = Goals; A = Assists; Pts = Points; PIM = Penalty minutes; +/- = Plus/minus; PPG = Power-play goals; SHG = Short-handed goals; GWG = Game-winning goals
Pos = Position;GP = Games played; Min, TOI = Minutes played; W = Wins; L = Losses; T,T/OT = Ties; OTL = Overtime losses; GA = Goals-against; GAA = Goals-against average; SO = Shutouts; SA = Shots against; SV = Shots saved;SV% = Save percentage;

== Awards and records ==
- Molson Cup – Martin Gerber

=== Records ===
- On November 6, 2007, the Ottawa Senators set a new franchise record for most consecutive wins (8) with a 5–1 victory over the Toronto Maple Leafs. They also set an NHL record for most points accumulated (26) after 14 games played, going 13–1–0 in that span.
- On January 24, 2008, Senators' captain Daniel Alfredsson broke the franchise record for most points in a game by one player by scoring 3 goals + 4 assists for 7 points in an 8–4 romp over the Tampa Bay Lightning. The three goals were scored in three different ways: One was scored 5–on-5, another was scored on a powerplay and the final goal of the hat-trick was scored shorthanded.
- On February 19, 2008, the Ottawa Senators set a new franchise record in shootout wins by winning their third by a score of 3–2 against the Philadelphia Flyers.
- On April 11, 2008, Martin Gerber broke the franchise record for most saves made in a playoff game, by stopping 49 out of 53 shots against the Pittsburgh Penguins in Game 2 of the Eastern Conference Quarterfinals.

=== Milestones ===
- On December 5, 2007, the Ottawa Senators celebrated their 500th franchise win with a 5–4 victory over the Florida Panthers.
- On February 6, 2008, the Ottawa Senators suffered their 500th franchise defeat without an earning a point in a 4–3 loss to the Montreal Canadiens.

Regular season
Player	Milestone	Reached
Nick Foligno	1st NHL game	October 4, 2007
Daniel Alfredsson	50th NHL GWG	October 4, 2007
Brian Elliott	1st NHL game 1st NHL start 1st NHL win	October 10, 2007
Dany Heatley	400th NHL point	October 18, 2007
Nick Foligno	1st NHL goal 1st NHL point	October 20, 2007
Shean Donovan	1st goal w/ Ottawa	October 20, 2007
Dany Heatley	300th NHL PIM	October 27, 2007
Randy Robitaille	1st goal w/ Ottawa	November 1, 2007
Daniel Alfredsson	300th NHL goal	November 1, 2007
Mike Fisher	200th NHL point	November 3, 2007
Mike Fisher	400th NHL game	November 10, 2007
Chris Neil	1000th NHL PIM	November 10, 2007
Chris Neil	400th NHL game	November 15, 2007
Daniel Alfredsson	800th NHL game	November 15, 2007
Alexander Nikulin	1st NHL game	November 22, 2007
Joe Corvo	300th NHL game	November 22, 2007
Shean Donovan	800th NHL game	December 4, 2007
Antoine Vermette	100th NHL point	December 7, 2007
Mike Fisher	100th NHL goal	December 12, 2007
Dean McAmmond	400th NHL point	December 12, 2007
Daniel Alfredsson	800th NHL point	December 13, 2007
Cody Bass	1st NHL game	December 15, 2007
Dany Heatley	200th NHL goal	December 15, 2007
Jason Spezza	200th NHL assist	December 15, 2007
Luke Richardson	1st goal w/ Ottawa	December 18, 2007
Chris Kelly	200th NHL game	December 20, 2007
Wade Redden	100th NHL goal	December 26, 2007
Cody Bass	1st NHL assist 1st NHL point	December 27, 2007
Andrej Meszaros	200th NHL game	December 27, 2007
Jason Spezza	300th NHL point	December 27, 2007
Mike Fisher	1st NHL hat-trick	December 29, 2007
Cody Bass	1st NHL goal	January 4, 2008
Wade Redden	800th NHL game	January 11, 2008
Daniel Alfredsson	100th NHL PPG	January 13, 2008
Ilya Zubov	1st NHL game	January 15, 2008
Andrej Meszaros; Anton Volchenkov	200th NHL PIM	January 20, 2008
Wade Redden	400th NHL point	January 20, 2008
Randy Robitaille	500th NHL game	January 20, 2008
Jason Spezza	100th NHL goal	January 24, 2008
Wade Redden	300th NHL assist	January 24, 2008
Daniel Alfredsson	500th NHL assist	January 24, 2008
Jason Spezza	1st NHL hat-trick 1st NHL 6–point game	February 9, 2008
Joe Corvo	100th NHL assist	February 9, 2008
Dany Heatley	400th NHL game	February 12, 2008
Cory Stillman	1st assist w/ Ottawa; 1st point w/ Ottawa	February 12, 2008
Luke Richardson	200th NHL point	February 13, 2008
Jason Spezza	300th NHL game	February 19, 2008
Cory Stillman	1st goal w/ Ottawa	February 21, 2008
Luke Richardson	1400th NHL game	February 25, 2008
Martin Lapointe	1st goal w/ Ottawa; 1st point w/ Ottawa	March 1, 2008
Martin Lapointe	1st assist w/ Ottawa	March 13, 2008
Shean Donovan	600th NHL PIM	March 13, 2008
Mike Commodore	1st assist w/ Ottawa; 1st point w/ Ottawa	March 22, 2008
Brian Lee	1st NHL game	March 25, 2008
Jesse Winchester	1st NHL game	March 29, 2008
Antoine Vermette	1st NHL hat-trick	April 3, 2008
Brian Lee	1st NHL assist 1st NHL point	April 3, 2008
Martin Gerber	109th NHL victory	April 3, 2008
Martin Gerber	200th NHL game	April 4, 2008

Playoffs
Player	Milestone	Reached
Brian Lee; Nick Foligno; Cody Bass	1st NHL playoff game	April 9, 2008
Cody Bass	1st NHL playoff goal 1st NHL playoff point	April 11, 2008
Shean Donovan	1st playoff goal w/ Ottawa	April 11, 2008
Nick Foligno	1st NHL playoff goal 1st NHL playoff point	April 14, 2008
Daniel Alfredsson	100th NHL playoff game	April 14, 2008

== Transactions ==
The Senators have been involved in the following transactions during the 2007–08 season.

=== Trades ===
June 23, 2007

To Tampa Bay Lightning

Fifth-round pick in 2007 Draft (Matt Marshall)

Seventh-round pick in 2007 NHL entry draft (Torrie Jung)
Seventh-round pick in 2007 NHL entry draft (Justin Courtnall)

To Ottawa Senators

Fourth-round pick in 2008 Draft (Derek Grant)
July 17, 2007

To Boston Bruins

Peter Schaefer
To Ottawa Senators

Shean Donovan
February 11, 2008

To Carolina Hurricanes

Joe Corvo
Patrick Eaves
To Ottawa Senators

Cory Stillman
Mike Commodore
February 26, 2008

To Chicago Blackhawks

Sixth-round pick in 2008 Draft (Ben Smith)
To Ottawa Senators

Martin Lapointe

== Free agents ==
=== Free agent acquisitions ===
Player	Former team	Contract terms
Matt Carkner	Pittsburgh Penguins	One year, $475,000
Niko Dimitrakos	Philadelphia Flyers	One year, $575,000
Luke Richardson	Tampa Bay Lightning	One year, $500,000
Randy Robitaille	New York Islanders	One year, $625,000
Jesse Winchester	Colgate University	One year, terms not announced

=== Players lost to free agency ===
Player	New team
Mike Comrie	New York Islanders
Andrew Ebbett	Anaheim Ducks
Jeff Heerema	Frankfurt Lions
Neil Komadoski	St. Louis Blues
Tom Preissing	Los Angeles Kings
Oleg Saprykin	CSKA Moscow

== Draft picks ==
Ottawa's picks at the 2007 NHL entry draft in Columbus, Ohio.

Round	#	Player	Position	Nationality	College/junior/club team (league)
1	29th	James O'Brien	Centre	United States	University of Minnesota (NCAA)
2	60th	Ruslan Bashkirov	Left wing	Russia	Quebec Remparts (QMJHL)
3	90th	Louie Caporusso	LW/C	Canada	St. Michael's Buzzers (OPJRA)
4	120th	Ben Blood	Defence	United States	Shattuck-Saint Mary's (Midget Major AAA)

== Farm teams ==
=== Binghamton Senators ===
Cory Clouston was named head coach of the Binghamton Senators for the 2007–08 season.

The Senators saw an improvement of 27 points in the standings, as Binghamton finished the season the season with a 34–32–9–5 record, earning 82 points. Despite the improvement, the club finished in sixth place in the East Division and failed to qualify for the post-season.

Denis Hamel scored a team-high 32 goals and 55 points. Brian Elliott led the club with 18 victories, as well as having a team best 2.81 GAA and a .915 save percentage.

== See also ==
- 2007–08 NHL season
