= 2007–08 Philadelphia Flyers season =

NHL hockey team season

2007–08 Philadelphia Flyers
- Division: 4th Atlantic
- Conference: 6th Eastern
- 2007–08 record: 42–29–11
- Home record: 21–14–6
- Road record: 21–15–5
- Goals for: 248
- Goals against: 233

Team information
- General manager: Paul Holmgren
- Coach: John Stevens
- Captain: Jason Smith
- Alternate captains: Simon Gagne; Mike Richards; Kimmo Timonen
- Arena: Wachovia Center
- Average attendance: 19,556 (100.2%)
- Minor league affiliates: Philadelphia Phantoms; Wheeling Nailers

Team leaders
- Goals: Danny Briere (31)
- Assists: Mike Richards (47)
- Points: Mike Richards (75)
- Penalty minutes: Riley Cote (202)
- Plus/minus: Braydon Coburn (+17)
- Wins: Martin Biron (30)
- Goals against average: Martin Biron (2.59)

The 2007–08 Philadelphia Flyers season was the franchise's 41st season in the National Hockey League (NHL). The Flyers went from the worst team in the league during the previous season to the Eastern Conference finals, losing to the Pittsburgh Penguins in five games.

== Off-season ==
In June, the Flyers made a trade which sent the first round draft pick they had acquired in the Peter Forsberg trade (23rd overall) back to the Nashville Predators for the rights to negotiate with impending unrestricted free agents Kimmo Timonen and Scott Hartnell. Both were signed to six-year contracts.

Due to having the NHL's worst record during the 2006–07 season, the Flyers had the best chance to claim the first overall pick in the draft lottery. However, the Chicago Blackhawks won the lottery and jumped up to the first overall selection, relegating the Flyers to the 2nd overall pick. After much speculation as to whether the Flyers would trade the pick in the 2007 NHL entry draft, the Flyers stayed put and selected New Jersey native James van Riemsdyk.

The Flyers wasted no time in addressing their free agent needs. On July 1, the Flyers signed Buffalo Sabres center Danny Briere to an eight-year, $52 million contract. Continuing to revamp their defensive core, defenseman Joni Pitkanen and forward Geoff Sanderson were traded to the Edmonton Oilers for defenseman Jason Smith and forward Joffrey Lupul. Smith was named Flyers captain on October 1.

== Regular season ==
The season began in the image of the Broad Street Bullies era, with multiple-game suspensions handed out to five separate players, the most serious being 20- and 25-game suspensions to Steve Downie and Jesse Boulerice, respectively, for two separate incidents. A 7–3 start in October and a 9–3–1 January run had the Flyers near the top of both the division and conference standings. However, a disastrous ten-game losing streak in February, reminiscent of such a streak the previous season, nearly derailed the Flyers' season. An 8–3–4 run in March coupled with two vital wins over the New Jersey Devils and the Pittsburgh Penguins over the final weekend of the regular season put the Flyers back in the playoffs as the sixth seed and set for a first round matchup with the Washington Capitals.

=== Divisional standings ===
Atlantic Division
		GP	W	L	OTL	GF	GA	Pts
**1**	**Pittsburgh Penguins**	**82**	**47**	**27**	**8**	**247**	**216**	**102**
**2**	**New Jersey Devils**	**82**	**46**	**29**	**7**	**206**	**197**	**99**
**3**	**New York Rangers**	**82**	**42**	**27**	**13**	**213**	**199**	**97**
**4**	**Philadelphia Flyers**	**82**	**42**	**29**	**11**	**248**	**233**	**95**
5	New York Islanders	82	35	38	9	194	243	79

=== Conference standings ===
Eastern Conference
R		Div	GP	W	L	OTL	GF	GA	Pts
**1**	**z – Montreal Canadiens**	**NE**	**82**	**47**	**25**	**10**	**262**	**222**	104
**2**	**y – Pittsburgh Penguins**	**AT**	**82**	**47**	**27**	**8**	**247**	**216**	102
**3**	**y – Washington Capitals**	**SE**	**82**	**43**	**31**	**8**	**242**	**231**	94
**4**	**New Jersey Devils**	**AT**	**82**	**46**	**29**	**7**	**206**	**197**	99
**5**	**New York Rangers**	**AT**	**82**	**42**	**27**	**13**	**213**	**199**	97
**6**	**Philadelphia Flyers**	**AT**	**82**	**42**	**29**	**11**	**248**	**233**	95
**7**	**Ottawa Senators**	**NE**	**82**	**43**	**31**	**8**	**261**	**247**	94
**8**	**Boston Bruins**	**NE**	**82**	**41**	**29**	**12**	**212**	**222**	94
8.5
9	Carolina Hurricanes	SE	82	43	33	6	252	249	92
10	Buffalo Sabres	NE	82	39	31	12	255	242	90
11	Florida Panthers	SE	82	38	35	9	216	226	85
12	Toronto Maple Leafs	NE	82	36	35	11	231	260	83
13	New York Islanders	AT	82	35	38	9	194	243	79
14	Atlanta Thrashers	SE	82	34	40	8	216	272	76
15	Tampa Bay Lightning	SE	82	31	42	9	223	267	71

Divisions: AT – Atlantic, NE – Northeast, SE – Southeast

bold – qualified for playoffs, y – division winner, z – placed first in conference (and division)

== Playoffs ==
After taking a three games to one series lead over Washington, the Capitals won Games 5 and 6 to force a Game 7 in Washington. The Flyers won the series in overtime on Joffrey Lupul's power play goal. The Flyers then drew a matchup with the heavily-favored Montreal Canadiens in the second round. Despite being outshot the majority of the series, the Flyers upset Montreal in five games and advanced to the Eastern Conference finals for the first time since 2003–04 to face the Pittsburgh Penguins. Before the start of the series, the Flyers suffered a fatal blow when it was learned that defenseman Kimmo Timonen was out with a blood clot in his ankle. Coupled with a gruesome facial injury to Braydon Coburn in Game 2, Pittsburgh ran roughshod over the Flyers' depleted defense and jumped out to a 3–0 series lead. The Flyers won Game 4 at home to stave off elimination, and although Timonen returned for Game 5, Pittsburgh finished off the Flyers in five games.

== Schedule and results ==
=== Preseason ===
2007 preseason
Preseason: 3–5–0 (home: 1–3–0; road: 2–2–0)

Game	Date	Score	Opponent	Decision	Attendance	Record	Recap
1^{[a]}	September 17	3–2	@ New Jersey Devils	Biron	4,615	1–0–0	W
2^{[b]}	September 18	0–4	Ottawa Senators	Niittymaki	9,100	1–1–0	L
3	September 22	5–0	@ New York Rangers	Biron	12,500	2–1–0	W
4	September 24	1–3	New Jersey Devils	Biron	16,572	2–2–0	L
5	September 25	2–4	@ Ottawa Senators	Niittymaki	18,053	2–3–0	L
6	September 26	2–1	Washington Capitals	Biron	16,327	3–3–0	W
7	September 28	5–7	@ Washington Capitals	Niittymaki	10,409	3–4–0	L
8	September 29	2–3	New York Rangers	Biron	17,911	3–5–0	L
Notes:^{a} Game played at Sovereign Bank Arena in Trenton, New Jersey.^{b} Game played at John Labatt Centre in London, Ontario.

Legend: W Win (2 points) L Loss (0 points) OTL Overtime/shootout loss (1 point)

=== Regular season ===
2007–08 regular season
October: 7–3–0 (home: 4–0–0; road: 3–3–0)

Game	Date	Score	Opponent	Decision	Attendance	Record	Points	Recap
1	October 4	3–2	@ Calgary Flames	Biron	19,289	1–0–0	2	W
2	October 6	3–5	@ Edmonton Oilers	Biron	16,839	1–1–0	2	L
3	October 10	8–2	@ Vancouver Canucks	Biron	18,630	2–1–0	4	W
4	October 13	3–1	New York Islanders	Biron	19,714	3–1–0	6	W
5	October 16	4–0	Atlanta Thrashers	Biron	18,933	4–1–0	8	W
6	October 18	4–0	New Jersey Devils	Biron	19,113	5–1–0	10	W
7	October 20	3–2 OT	Carolina Hurricanes	Biron	19,615	6–1–0	12	W
8	October 24	3–4	@ Florida Panthers	Biron	12,856	6–2–0	12	L
9	October 25	2–5	@ Tampa Bay Lightning	Niittymaki	18,616	6–3–0	12	L
10	October 27	2–1	@ Boston Bruins	Biron	14,956	7–3–0	14	W

November: 7–5–2 (home: 2–2–2; road: 5–3–0)

Game	Date	Score	Opponent	Decision	Attendance	Record	Points	Recap
11	November 1	2–5	@ Montreal Canadiens	Biron	21,173	7–4–0	14	L
12	November 2	3–2	@ Washington Capitals	Niittymaki	16,055	8–4–0	16	W
13	November 5	0–2	@ New York Rangers	Biron	18,200	8–5–0	16	L
14	November 7	3–1	@ Pittsburgh Penguins	Biron	17,132	9–5–0	18	W
15	November 8	1–4	@ New Jersey Devils	Biron	14,948	9–6–0	18	L
16	November 10	5–2	Pittsburgh Penguins	Biron	19,859	10–6–0	20	W
17	November 12	3–2	New York Islanders	Biron	19,312	11–6–0	22	W
18	November 15	3–4 SO	New York Rangers	Biron	19,571	11–6–1	23	OTL
19	November 17	2–6	New Jersey Devils	Biron	19,621	11–7–1	23	L
20	November 21	6–3	@ Carolina Hurricanes	Biron	16,351	12–7–1	25	W
21	November 23	3–4 OT	Washington Capitals	Biron	19,727	12–7–2	26	OTL
22	November 24	4–3	@ Ottawa Senators	Niittymaki	20,128	13–7–2	28	W
23	November 26	3–6	Boston Bruins	Niittymaki	19,457	13–8–2	28	L
24	November 28	3–1	@ Carolina Hurricanes	Biron	15,108	14–8–2	30	W

December: 5–6–2 (home: 2–3–2; road: 3–3–0)

Game	Date	Score	Opponent	Decision	Attendance	Record	Points	Recap
25	December 1	1–4	Dallas Stars	Biron	19,660	14–9–2	30	L
26	December 5	3–1	@ Minnesota Wild	Niittymaki	18,568	15–9–2	32	W
27	December 7	1–2	@ Colorado Avalanche	Biron	16,312	15–10–2	32	L
28	December 11	8–2	Pittsburgh Penguins	Biron	19,409	16–10–2	34	W
29	December 13	1–4	Montreal Canadiens	Niittymaki	19,322	16–11–2	34	L
30	December 15	5–6 SO	Carolina Hurricanes	Biron	19,460	16–11–3	35	OTL
31	December 16	2–4	@ New Jersey Devils	Niittymaki	16,687	16–12–3	35	L
32	December 18	2–3	Phoenix Coyotes	Biron	19,211	16–13–3	35	L
33	December 21	2–3	@ Buffalo Sabres	Biron	18,690	16–14–3	35	L
34	December 22	5–6 SO	Buffalo Sabres	Biron	19,606	16–14–4	36	OTL
35	December 27	4–1	Toronto Maple Leafs	Biron	19,727	17–14–4	38	W
36	December 29	4–2	@ Tampa Bay Lightning	Biron	20,124	18–14–4	40	W
37	December 30	1–0	@ Florida Panthers	Niittymaki	18,767	19–14–4	42	W

January: 9–3–1 (home: 4–2–1; road: 5–1–0)

Game	Date	Score	Opponent	Decision	Attendance	Record	Points	Recap
38	January 4	0–3	@ New Jersey Devils	Biron	17,625	19–15–4	42	L
39	January 5	3–2	@ Toronto Maple Leafs	Niittymaki	19,412	20–15–4	44	W
40	January 8	4–1	@ Atlanta Thrashers	Niittymaki	13,047	21–15–4	46	W
41	January 10	6–2	@ New York Rangers	Niittymaki	18,200	22–15–4	48	W
42	January 12	3–4 OT	Boston Bruins	Niittymaki	19,792	22–15–5	49	OTL
43	January 13	6–4	@ Washington Capitals	Biron	17,713	23–15–5	51	W
44	January 16	5–3	Florida Panthers	Niittymaki	19,207	24–15–5	53	W
45	January 19	5–3	@ New York Islanders	Biron	16,234	25–15–5	55	W
46	January 20	6–1	Ottawa Senators	Niittymaki	19,742	26–15–5	57	W
47	January 22	3–7	New Jersey Devils	Niittymaki	19,677	26–16–5	57	L
48	January 24	4–3	Pittsburgh Penguins	Biron	19,807	27–16–5	59	W
49	January 29	3–2 OT	Los Angeles Kings	Biron	19,127	28–16–5	61	W
50	January 31	0–4	New York Rangers	Niittymaki	19,670	28–17–5	61	L

February: 4–8–2 (home: 2–5–1; road: 2–3–1)

Game	Date	Score	Opponent	Decision	Attendance	Record	Points	Recap
51	February 2	3–0	Anaheim Ducks	Biron	19,822	29–17–5	63	W
52	February 5	3–2	@ Atlanta Thrashers	Niittymaki	15,082	30–17–5	65	W
53	February 6	3–4	Washington Capitals	Biron	19,778	30–18–5	65	L
54	February 9	0–2	New York Rangers	Biron	19,862	30–19–5	65	L
55	February 10	3–4	@ Pittsburgh Penguins	Biron	17,132	30–20–5	65	L
56	February 12	3–4	@ New York Islanders	Niittymaki	11,193	30–21–5	65	L
57	February 14	3–5	Tampa Bay Lightning	Biron	19,336	30–22–5	65	L
58	February 16	0–1	@ Montreal Canadiens	Niittymaki	21,273	30–23–5	65	L
59	February 17	3–5	Montreal Canadiens	Niitymaki	19,611	30–24–5	65	L
60	February 19	2–3 SO	@ Ottawa Senators	Biron	19,729	30–24–6	66	OTL
61	February 21	1–3	San Jose Sharks	Biron	19,487	30–25–6	66	L
62	February 23	1–2 OT	Florida Panthers	Niitymaki	19,629	30–25–7	67	OTL
63	February 25	4–3 SO	@ Buffalo Sabres	Biron	18,690	31–25–7	69	W
64	February 28	3–1	Ottawa Senators	Biron	19,567	32–25–7	71	W

March: 8–3–4 (home: 5–2–0; road: 3–1–4)

Game	Date	Score	Opponent	Decision	Attendance	Record	Points	Recap
65	March 1	4–1	@ New York Islanders	Biron	15,136	33–25–7	73	W
66	March 2	4–5 SO	@ New York Rangers	Biron	18,200	33–25–8	74	OTL
67	March 4	2–5	Buffalo Sabres	Biron	19,516	33–26–8	74	L
68	March 6	3–2	Tampa Bay Lightning	Biron	19,217	34–26–8	76	W
69	March 8	4–1	New York Islanders	Biron	19,748	35–26–8	78	W
70	March 11	3–4 OT	@ Toronto Maple Leafs	Biron	19,507	35–26–9	79	OTL
71	March 12	2–3	Toronto Maple Leafs	Biron	19,642	35–27–9	79	L
72	March 15	2–3 OT	@ Boston Bruins	Biron	17,565	35–27–10	80	OTL
73	March 16	1–7	@ Pittsburgh Penguins	Biron	17,132	35–28–10	80	L
74	March 18	3–2	Atlanta Thrashers	Niittymaki	19,564	36–28–10	82	W
75	March 21	4–3 SO	New York Rangers	Biron	19,819	37–28–10	84	W
76	March 23	4–1	New York Islanders	Biron	19,136	38–28–10	86	W
77	March 25	2–1 OT	@ New York Rangers	Biron	18,200	39–28–10	88	W
78	March 28	4–5 SO	@ New Jersey Devils	Biron	17,056	39–28–11	89	OTL
79	March 29	4–3 SO	@ New York Islanders	Niittymaki	15,223	40–28–11	91	W

April: 2–1–0 (home: 2–0–0; road: 0–1–0)

Game	Date	Score	Opponent	Decision	Attendance	Record	Points	Recap
80	April 2	2–4	@ Pittsburgh Penguins	Biron	17,132	40–29–11	91	L
81	April 4	3–0	New Jersey Devils	Biron	19,957	41–29–11	93	W
82	April 6	2–0	Pittsburgh Penguins	Biron	19,767	42–29–11	95	W

Legend: W Win (2 points) L Loss (0 points) OTL Overtime/shootout loss (1 point)

=== Playoffs ===
2008 Stanley Cup playoffs
Eastern Conference quarterfinals vs. Washington Capitals – Flyers win 4–3

Game	Date	Score	Opponent	Decision	Attendance	Series	Recap
1	April 11	4–5	@ Washington Capitals	Biron	18,277	Capitals lead 1–0	L
2	April 13	2–0	@ Washington Capitals	Biron	18,277	Series tied 1–1	W
3	April 15	6–3	Washington Capitals	Biron	19,822	Flyers lead 2–1	W
4	April 17	4–3 2OT	Washington Capitals	Biron	19,913	Flyers lead 3–1	W
5	April 19	2–3	@ Washington Capitals	Biron	18,277	Flyers lead 3–2	L
6	April 21	2–4	Washington Capitals	Biron	19,927	Series tied 3–3	L
7	April 22	3–2 OT	@ Washington Capitals	Biron	18,277	Flyers win 4–3	W

Eastern Conference semifinals vs. Montreal Canadiens – Flyers win 4–1

Game	Date	Score	Opponent	Decision	Attendance	Series	Recap
1	April 24	3–4 OT	@ Montreal Canadiens	Biron	21,273	Canadiens lead 1–0	L
2	April 26	4–2	@ Montreal Canadiens	Biron	21,273	Series tied 1–1	W
3	April 28	3–2	Montreal Canadiens	Biron	19,849	Flyers lead 2–1	W
4	April 30	4–2	Montreal Canadiens	Biron	19,872	Flyers lead 3–1	W
5	May 3	6–4	@ Montreal Canadiens	Biron	21,273	Flyers win 4–1	W

Eastern Conference finals vs. Pittsburgh Penguins – Penguins win 4–1

Game	Date	Score	Opponent	Decision	Attendance	Series	Recap
1	May 9	2–4	@ Pittsburgh Penguins	Biron	17,132	Penguins lead 1–0	L
2	May 11	2–4	@ Pittsburgh Penguins	Biron	17,132	Penguins lead 2–0	L
3	May 13	1–4	Pittsburgh Penguins	Biron	19,965	Penguins lead 3–0	L
4	May 15	4–2	Pittsburgh Penguins	Biron	19,972	Penguins lead 3–1	W
5	May 18	0–6	@ Pittsburgh Penguins	Biron	17,132	Penguins win 4–1	L

Legend: W Win L Loss

== Player statistics ==
=== Scoring ===
- Position abbreviations: C = Center; D = Defense; G = Goaltender; LW = Left wing; RW = Right wing
- † = Joined team via a transaction (e.g., trade, waivers, signing) during the season. Stats reflect time with the Flyers only.
- ‡ = Left team via a transaction (e.g., trade, waivers, release) during the season. Stats reflect time with the Flyers only.

No.	Player	Pos	Regular season						Playoffs					
No.	Player	Pos	GP	G	A	Pts	+/-	PIM	GP	G	A	Pts	+/-	PIM
18	Mike Richards	C	73	28	47	75	14	76	17	7	7	14	0	8
48	Danny Briere	C	79	31	41	72	−22	68	17	9	7	16	−3	20
22	Mike Knuble	RW	82	29	26	55	−3	72	12	3	4	7	−1	6
17	Jeff Carter	C	82	29	24	53	6	55	17	6	5	11	0	12
20	R. J. Umberger	C	74	13	37	50	0	19	17	10	5	15	7	10
15	Joffrey Lupul	RW	56	20	26	46	2	35	17	4	6	10	1	2
44	Kimmo Timonen	D	80	8	36	44	0	50	13	0	6	6	3	8
19	Scott Hartnell	LW	80	24	19	43	2	159	17	3	4	7	−2	20
5	Braydon Coburn	D	78	9	27	36	17	74	14	0	6	6	4	14
6	Randy Jones	D	71	5	26	31	8	58	16	0	2	2	6	4
9	Scottie Upshall	RW	61	14	16	30	2	74	17	3	4	7	1	44
12	Simon Gagne	LW	25	7	11	18	−8	4	—	—	—	—	—	—
40	Vaclav Prospal†	LW	18	4	10	14	7	6	17	3	10	13	−3	6
27	Steve Downie	RW	32	6	6	12	2	73	6	0	1	1	−2	10
34	Jim Dowd	C	73	5	5	10	0	41	17	1	2	3	0	4
21	Jason Smith	D	77	1	9	10	−4	86	17	0	2	2	−4	4
24	Sami Kapanen	RW	74	5	3	8	−12	16	16	2	0	2	−4	2
2	Derian Hatcher	D	44	2	5	7	4	33	15	1	2	3	2	40
53	Denis Tolpeko	C	26	1	5	6	−4	24	—	—	—	—	—	—
26	Jim Vandermeer†‡	D	28	1	5	6	−1	27	—	—	—	—	—	—
28	Lasse Kukkonen	D	53	1	4	5	3	38	14	0	2	2	−1	6
25	Patrick Thoresen†	LW	20	0	5	5	−6	8	14	0	2	2	1	4
32	Riley Cote	LW	70	1	3	4	2	202	3	0	0	0	0	0
14	Stefan Ruzicka	RW	14	1	3	4	5	27	—	—	—	—	—	—
26	Jaroslav Modry†	D	18	0	3	3	−11	8	9	0	3	3	−6	0
43	Martin Biron	G	62	0	1	1		8	17	0	1	1		2
8	Rory Fitzpatrick†	D	19	0	1	1	−12	11	—	—	—	—	—	—
11	Ryan Potulny	C	7	0	1	1	0	4	—	—	—	—	—	—
36	Jesse Boulerice	RW	5	0	0	0	−2	29	—	—	—	—	—	—
55	Ben Eager‡	LW	23	0	0	0	−8	62	—	—	—	—	—	—
56	Claude Giroux	RW	2	0	0	0	−2	0	—	—	—	—	—	—
65	Kyle Greentree	LW	2	0	0	0	−1	0	—	—	—	—	—	—
29	Nate Guenin	D	2	0	0	0	2	2	—	—	—	—	—	—
30	Antero Niittymaki	G	28	0	0	0		0	—	—	—	—	—	—
77	Ryan Parent	D	22	0	0	0	−4	6	4	0	1	1	−1	0
45	Alexandre Picard‡	D	4	0	0	0	−3	2	—	—	—	—	—	—

=== Goaltending ===
No.	Player	Regular season											Playoffs									
No.	Player	GP	GS	W	L	OT	SA	GA	GAA	SV%	SO	TOI	GP	GS	W	L	SA	GA	GAA	SV%	SO	TOI
43	Martin Biron	62	59	30	20	9	1865	153	2.59	.918	5	3,539	17	17	9	8	540	52	2.98	.904	1	1,049
30	Antero Niittymaki	28	23	12	9	2	739	69	2.91	.907	1	1,424	—	—	—	—	—	—	—	—	—	—

== Awards and records ==
=== Awards ===
Type	Award/honor	Recipient	Ref
League (in-season)	NHL 1st Star of the Week	Martin Biron (October 22)	
League (in-season)	NHL 1st Star of the Week	Danny Briere (November 26)	
League (in-season)	NHL 3rd Star of the Week	Joffrey Lupul (December 17)	
League (in-season)	NHL 3rd Star of the Week	Scott Hartnell (January 14)	
League (in-season)	NHL 3rd Star of the Week	Scott Hartnell (January 21)	
League (in-season)	NHL 3rd Star of the Week	Mike Knuble (March 3)	
League (in-season)	NHL All-Star Game selection	Mike Richards	
League (in-season)	NHL All-Star Game selection	Kimmo Timonen	
Team	Barry Ashbee Trophy	Kimmo Timonen	
Team	Bobby Clarke Trophy	Mike Richards	
Team	Gene Hart Memorial Award	Mike Richards	
Team	Pelle Lindbergh Memorial Trophy	Braydon Coburn	
Team	Pelle Lindbergh Memorial Trophy	Riley Cote	
Team	Toyota Cup	Martin Biron	
Team	Yanick Dupre Memorial Class Guy Award	Martin Biron	

=== Records ===
Among the team records set during the 2007–08 season was Danny Briere tying the team record for most goals scored in a single period (3) on November 21. In a 3–2 win against the Toronto Maple Leafs on January 5, goaltender Antero Niittymaki made 54 saves on 56 shots against, both team single game records. On January 19, Scott Hartnell scored three powerplay goals, tying the Flyers single game record.

=== Milestones ===
Milestone	Player	Date	Ref
First game	Denis Tolpeko	October 4, 2007	
First game	Steve Downie	December 5, 2007	
First game	Kyle Greentree	February 12, 2008	
First game	Claude Giroux	February 19, 2008	

== Transactions ==
The Flyers were involved in the following transactions from June 7, 2007, the day after the deciding game of the 2007 Stanley Cup Final, through June 4, 2008, the day of the deciding game of the 2008 Stanley Cup Final.

=== Trades ===
Date	Details		Ref
June 18, 2007	To Philadelphia Flyers: Rights to Scott Hartnell; Rights to Kimmo Timonen	To Nashville Predators: Nashville's 1st-round pick in 2007	
June 23, 2007	To Philadelphia Flyers: Carolina's 2nd-round pick in 2007	To Washington Capitals: 2nd-round pick in 2008; Nashville's 3rd-round pick in 2007	
July 1, 2007	To Philadelphia Flyers: Joffrey Lupul; Jason Smith	To Edmonton Oilers: Joni Pitkanen; Geoff Sanderson; 3rd-round pick in 2009	
December 10, 2007	To Philadelphia Flyers: Conditional 7th-round pick in 2009 (Note: Condition not met.)	To Dallas Stars: Jussi Timonen	
December 18, 2007	To Philadelphia Flyers: Jim Vandermeer	To Chicago Blackhawks: Ben Eager	
February 19, 2008	To Philadelphia Flyers: Jaroslav Modry	To Los Angeles Kings: 3rd-round pick in 2008	
February 20, 2008	To Philadelphia Flyers: 3rd-round pick in 2009	To Calgary Flames: Jim Vandermeer	
February 25, 2008	To Philadelphia Flyers: Vaclav Prospal	To Tampa Bay Lightning: Alexandre Picard; 2nd-round pick in 2009	

=== Players acquired ===
Date	Player	Former team	Term	Via	Ref
July 1, 2007	Danny Briere	Buffalo Sabres	8-year	Free agency	
October 3, 2007	Jesse Boulerice	Albany River Rats (AHL)	1-year	Free agency	
October 3, 2007	Jim Dowd	New Jersey Devils	1-year	Free agency	
October 9, 2007	Rory Fitzpatrick	Vancouver Canucks	1-year	Free agency	
February 22, 2008	Patrick Thoresen	Edmonton Oilers		Waivers	
March 19, 2008	Michael Teslak	Michigan Tech University (WCHA)	2-year	Free agency	
April 8, 2008	Jared Ross	Philadelphia Phantoms (AHL)	1-year	Free agency	
May 9, 2008	Darroll Powe	Philadelphia Phantoms (AHL)	2-year	Free agency	

=== Players lost ===
Date	Player	New team	Via (Note: In parentheses is the player's free agency group on July 1 if applicable.)	Ref
July 3, 2007	Brad Tapper	Iserlohn Roosters (DEL)	Free agency (III)	
July 6, 2007	Denis Hamel	Binghamton Senators (AHL)	Free agency (III)	
July 9, 2007	Todd Fedoruk	Dallas Stars	Free agency (III)	
July 9, 2007	Mike York	Phoenix Coyotes	Free agency (III)	
July 13, 2007	Niko Dimitrakos	Ottawa Senators	Free agency (III)	
July 16, 2007	Mark Cullen	Detroit Red Wings	Free agency (III)	
August 1, 2007	Dmitri Afanasenkov	HC Dynamo Moscow (RSL)	Free agency (UFA)	
September 29, 2007	Tony Voce	Ilves (Liiga)	Free agency	
October 4, 2007	Rosario Ruggeri	Lowell Devils (AHL)	Free agency (UFA)	
October 18, 2007	Robert Esche	Ak Bars Kazan (RSL)	Free agency (III)	
May 15, 2008	Lars Jonsson	Brynas IF (SHL)	Free agency	
May 29, 2008	Denis Tolpeko	HC Dynamo Moscow (KHL)	Free agency (Note: Philadelphia retained Tolpeko's NHL rights.)	
June 3, 2008	Sami Kapanen	KalPa (Liiga)	Retirement (Note: Kapanen retired from the NHL.)	

=== Signings ===
Date	Player	Term	Contract type	Ref
June 8, 2007	Lars Jonsson	1-year	Re-signing	
June 14, 2007	Antero Niittymaki	2-year	Re-signing	
July 1, 2007	Scott Hartnell	6-year	Re-signing	
July 1, 2007	Kimmo Timonen	6-year	Re-signing	
July 23, 2007	Claude Giroux	3-year	Entry-level	
July 25, 2007	Riley Cote	1-year	Re-signing	
July 25, 2007	Boyd Kane	2-year	Re-signing	
November 1, 2007	Patrick Maroon	3-year	Entry-level	
November 28, 2007	Braydon Coburn	2-year	Extension	
December 13, 2007	Mike Richards	12-year	Extension	
March 19, 2008	Rob Bellamy	2-year	Entry-level	
March 19, 2008	Matt Clackson	2-year	Entry-level	
March 30, 2008	Jon Kalinski	3-year	Entry-level	
April 4, 2008	Andreas Nodl	3-year	Entry-level	
April 4, 2008	Mike Ratchuk	3-year	Entry-level	
May 9, 2008	Garrett Klotz	3-year	Entry-level	

== Draft picks ==
Philadelphia's picks at the 2007 NHL entry draft, which was held at Nationwide Arena in Columbus, Ohio on June 22–23, 2007. The Flyers traded their original second, third, and fourth-round picks in three different trades.

Round	Pick	Player	Position	Nationality	Team (league)	Notes
1	2	James van Riemsdyk	Left wing	United States	U.S. NTDP (NAHL)	
2	41	Kevin Marshall	Defense	Canada	Lewiston Maineiacs (QMJHL)	(Note: The Flyers traded their 2008 second-round pick and the Nashville Predators' third-round pick, 84th overall, to the Washington Capitals for the Carolina Hurricanes' second-round pick, 41st overall, on June 23, 2007.)
3	66	Garrett Klotz	Left wing	Canada	Saskatoon Blades (WHL)	(Note: The Flyers traded Kyle Calder to the Chicago Blackhawks for Lasse Kukkonen and the Blackhawks' third-round pick, 66th overall, on February 26, 2007.)
5	122	Mario Kempe	Right wing	Sweden	St. John's Fog Devils (QMJHL)	
6	152	Jon Kalinski	Left wing	Canada	Bonnyville Pontiacs (AJHL)	
6	161	Patrick Maroon	Left wing	United States	London Knights (OHL)	(Note: The Flyers traded Jon Sim to the Florida Panthers for the Panthers' sixth-round pick, 161st overall, on January 23, 2006.)
7	182	Brad Phillips	Goaltender	United States	U.S. NTDP (NAHL)	

== Farm teams ==
The Flyers were affiliated with the Philadelphia Phantoms of the AHL and the Wheeling Nailers of the ECHL. The Phantoms, with Craig Berube returning as head coach, finished second in their division and won their first round playoff series against the Albany River Rats in seven games. They lost in the second round to the Wilkes-Barre/Scranton Penguins in five games. In their first and only season as the Flyers ECHL affiliate, the Nailers finished last in their division and missed the playoffs.
