= Shean Donovan =

Canadian ice hockey player

- Born: January 22, 1975 (age 51) Timmins, Ontario, Canada
- Height: 6 ft 3 in (191 cm)
- Weight: 225 lb (102 kg; 16 st 1 lb)
- Position: Right wing
- Shot: Right
- Played for: San Jose Sharks; Colorado Avalanche; Atlanta Thrashers; Pittsburgh Penguins; Calgary Flames; Boston Bruins; Ottawa Senators
- National team: Canada
- NHL draft: 28th overall, 1993; San Jose Sharks
- Playing career: 1995–2010

Shean Patrick Donovan (born January 22, 1975) is a Canadian professional ice hockey coach and former player, with a career including seven National Hockey League (NHL) clubs and 951 games, spanning from 1994 to 2010. He currently serves as a development coach for the Ottawa Senators.

== Career ==
Donovan was drafted 27th overall in the 1993 NHL entry draft by the San Jose Sharks and played his first full season in 1995–96. After his first four seasons with the Sharks, he was traded to the Colorado Avalanche, where he spent three seasons, contributing 13 goals and 19 assists before being traded to the Atlanta Thrashers in 1999.

In 2002, he was claimed by the Pittsburgh Penguins on waivers, then traded to the Calgary Flames in 2004, where he had a breakout during the 2003–04 season, scoring 18 goals. He was a part of the playoff run which saw the Flames defeat the Vancouver Canucks, Detroit Red Wings, and San Jose Sharks before being defeated by the Tampa Bay Lightning by a single goal in game seven of the Stanley Cup finals. In April 2011, Donovan recalled the victory as "kind of a bittersweet moment, not winning, but in the end going there was a great memory."

Donovan played for Genève-Servette HC in the Swiss Nationalliga A during the 2004–05 lockout, returning to the Flames for the 2005–06 season. On July 2, 2006, Donovan was signed to a two-year deal as a free agent by the Boston Bruins, with the intention of bringing more speed and energy to the Bruins. At the conclusion of the 2006–07 season, Donovan was traded by the Bruins to the Ottawa Senators for Peter Schaefer.

Donovan played for the Senators through the 2009–10 season, after which he became an unrestricted free agent. Unable to attract NHL interest before the start of the 2010–11 season, the Anaheim Ducks offered him a professional try-out contract with the Syracuse Crunch of the American Hockey League (AHL). On November 7, yet to make an appearance with the Crunch, Donovan decided to walk away from his try-out to return home, stating that he missed his family and his home in Ottawa, and that he had decided to retire from professional hockey. Donovan is currently an associate coach with a Jr. A team, the Kemptville 73’s. He currently serves as a development coach for the Ottawa Senators.

== Personal life ==
Shean Donovan was born in Timmins, Ontario and grew up in North Bay.

He has a son named Jorian Donovan who is a prospect for the Ottawa Senators, and a daughter Trinity Donovan, who plays volleyball. Shean and Jorian are the first father-son duo to have both played for the Senators.

== Career statistics ==
=== Regular season and playoffs ===
			Regular season					Playoffs
Season	Team	League	GP	G	A	Pts	PIM	GP	G	A	Pts	PIM
1990–91	Kanata Valley Lasers	CJHL	44	8	5	13	8	—	—	—	—	—
1991–92	Ottawa 67's	OHL	58	11	8	19	14	11	1	0	1	5
1992–93	Ottawa 67's	OHL	66	29	23	52	33	—	—	—	—	—
1993–94	Ottawa 67's	OHL	62	35	49	84	63	17	10	11	21	14
1994–95	Ottawa 67's	OHL	29	22	19	41	41	—	—	—	—	—
1994–95	Kansas City Blades	IHL	5	0	2	2	7	14	5	3	8	23
1994–95	San Jose Sharks	NHL	14	0	0	0	6	7	0	1	1	6
1995–96	Kansas City Blades	IHL	4	0	0	0	8	5	0	0	0	8
1995–96	San Jose Sharks	NHL	74	13	8	21	39	—	—	—	—	—
1996–97	Kentucky Thoroughblades	AHL	3	1	3	4	18	—	—	—	—	—
1996–97	San Jose Sharks	NHL	73	9	6	15	42	—	—	—	—	—
1997–98	San Jose Sharks	NHL	20	3	3	6	22	—	—	—	—	—
1997–98	Colorado Avalanche	NHL	47	5	7	12	48	—	—	—	—	—
1998–99	Colorado Avalanche	NHL	68	7	12	19	37	5	0	0	0	2
1999–00	Colorado Avalanche	NHL	18	1	0	1	8	—	—	—	—	—
1999–00	Atlanta Thrashers	NHL	33	4	7	11	18	—	—	—	—	—
2000–01	Atlanta Thrashers	NHL	63	12	11	23	47	—	—	—	—	—
2001–02	Atlanta Thrashers	NHL	48	6	6	12	40	—	—	—	—	—
2001–02	Pittsburgh Penguins	NHL	13	2	1	3	4	—	—	—	—	—
2002–03	Pittsburgh Penguins	NHL	52	4	5	9	30	—	—	—	—	—
2002–03	Calgary Flames	NHL	13	1	2	3	7	—	—	—	—	—
2003–04	Calgary Flames	NHL	82	18	24	42	72	24	5	5	10	23
2004–05	Genève–Servette HC	NLA	12	5	3	8	30	—	—	—	—	—
2005–06	Calgary Flames	NHL	80	9	11	20	82	7	0	0	0	6
2006–07	Boston Bruins	NHL	76	6	11	17	56	—	—	—	—	—
2007–08	Ottawa Senators	NHL	82	5	7	12	73	4	1	0	1	2
2008–09	Ottawa Senators	NHL	65	5	5	10	34	—	—	—	—	—
2009–10	Ottawa Senators	NHL	30	2	3	5	40	2	0	0	0	0
NHL totals			951	112	129	241	705	49	6	6	12	39

=== International ===
Medal record

Representing Canada

Ice hockey

World Championships
Gold medal – first place	1997	Helsinki

World Junior Championships
Gold medal – first place	1995	Alberta

Year	Team	Event	Result	GP	G	A	Pts	PIM
1995	Canada	WJC	1st place, gold medalist(s)	7	0	0	0	6
1997	Canada	WC	1st place, gold medalist(s)	10	0	1	1	31
Junior totals				7	0	0	0	6
Senior totals				10	0	1	1	31
