= Andrei Kostitsyn =

Belarusian ice hockey player (born 1985)

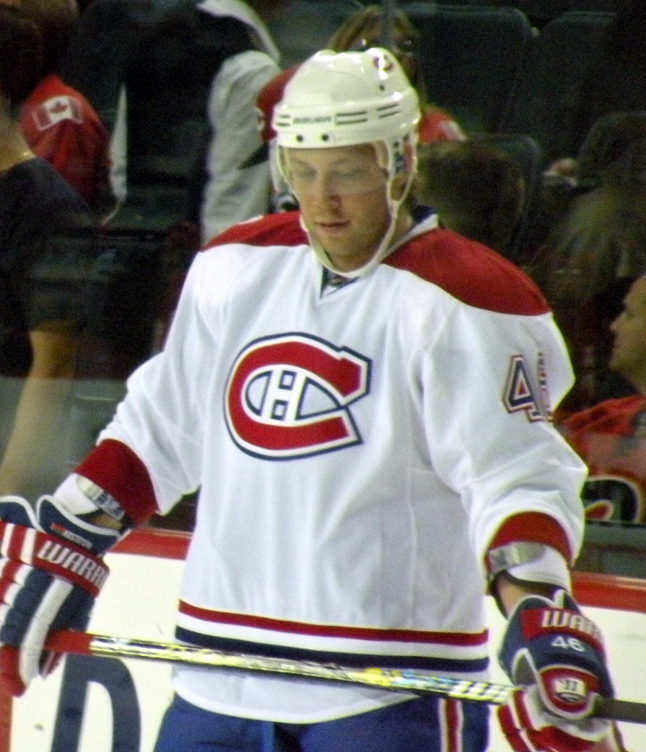
- Kostitsyn with the Montreal Canadiens in 2009
- Born: 3 February 1985 (age 41) Novopolotsk, Byelorussian SSR, Soviet Union
- Height: 6 ft 0 in (183 cm)
- Weight: 216 lb (98 kg; 15 st 6 lb)
- Position: Right wing
- Shot: Left
- team Former teams: Free agent Polimir Novopolotsk; Yunost Minsk; Khimik-ShVSM Vitebsk; CSKA Moscow; Hamilton Bulldogs; Montreal Canadiens; Nashville Predators; Traktor Chelyabinsk; HC Sochi; Torpedo Nizhny Novgorod; Kunlun Red Star; HC Dinamo Minsk; Neftekhimik Nizhnekamsk; HC Dynamo Pardubice
- National team: Belarus
- NHL draft: 10th overall, 2003; Montreal Canadiens
- Playing career: 2003–2022

Andrei Olegovich Kostitsyn (Belarusian: Андрэй Алегавiч Касціцын, romanized: Andrej Alehavič Kascicyn; Russian: Андрей Олегович Костицын; born 3 February 1985) is a former Belarusian professional ice hockey forward.

The media have nicknamed him "AK-46", a play on his initials (AK) and player number (46) in reference to the Soviet AK-47 rifle. He and his younger brother Sergei played together on the Montreal Canadiens and Nashville Predators.

== Playing career ==
=== Europe ===
Beginning in 2000–01, Kostitsyn spent the first two seasons of his early career with Polimir Novopolotsk, competing in several leagues, including the Eastern European Hockey League (EEHL). In the summer of 2002, he signed with CSKA Moscow and moved to Russia. He split his time with the organization between CSKA 2 of Russia's developmental league, and also continued to play in the Belarusian league with Yunost Minsk.

After his first season with CSKA, he was selected by the Montreal Canadiens in the first round, tenth overall, of the 2003 NHL entry draft. Kostitsyn drew favourable scouting reports from his strong showing at the 2003 World U-18 Championships and was expected to be taken even higher in the draft; it is speculated that health concerns with his back caused teams to pass him over.

=== Montreal Canadiens ===
In the summer of 2004, he was invited to the Canadiens' training camp and signed a three-year deal with the club. He was subsequently assigned to the Canadiens' American Hockey League (AHL) affiliate, the Hamilton Bulldogs, for the 2004–05 season. He scored his first goal with Hamilton in his first game, on 15 October 2004, and finished the season with 23 points in 66 games.

Midway through the 2005–06 season, he was called up by the Canadiens and played his first National Hockey League (NHL) game on 1 December 2005, but was limited to just one shift in a 3–2 overtime loss to the Buffalo Sabres. He was called up again later in December and scored his first career NHL goal on 13 December against Curtis Joseph in a 5–2 win over the Phoenix Coyotes.

Kostitsyn had a breakout season in 2007–08, playing on the Canadiens' most productive line alongside Alexei Kovalev and Tomáš Plekanec. He amassed 53 points in 78 games and was joined by his younger brother Sergei, who had been called up from Hamilton, midway through the season. Entering the playoffs with the Canadiens as the first seed, Andrei and Sergei both scored in their NHL postseason debuts against the Boston Bruins less than two minutes apart. They also both finished with eight points each in 12 playoff games. However, the Canadiens were defeated by the Philadelphia Flyers in the Eastern Conference Semifinals. On 1 July 2008, he signed a three-year extension worth an annual salary of $3.25 million with the Canadiens.

Several games into the 2008–09 season, he suffered a concussion when he was checked into the boards by Kurt Sauer of the Phoenix Coyotes. Kostitsyn laid on the ice for several minutes before needing to be helped off the ice. He returned to the team after missing two games. In December 2008, he missed another two games due to a minor leg injury, then returned to notch his first career NHL hat-trick on 27 December, in a 3–2 win over the Pittsburgh Penguins.

=== Nashville Predators ===
On 27 February 2012, Kostitsyn was traded to the Nashville Predators for a second-round pick in 2013 and a fifth-round pick in 2013.

On 1 May 2012, Kostitsyn and Predators' teammate Alexander Radulov were spotted at a Scottsdale bar at 5:00 a.m. the night before Game 2 of their second-round playoff series against the Coyotes, thus breaking curfew. Both were subsequently suspended by the Predators' management for Game 3. Said Predators' general manager David Poile of the incident: "What they did was unacceptable and the coaches and myself had to come to the plate and do the right thing for the team. It happened. It's really unfortunate. It's selfish behavior and we'll just have to leave it at that."

=== Return to Russia and Belarus ===
During the 2012 off-season, the Predators made it evident that they would not bring back Kostitsyn, although the Predators later re-signed his brother, Sergei. On 14 September 2012, Kostitsyn returned to Russia and signed a one-year contract with Traktor Chelyabinsk of the Kontinental Hockey League (KHL).

In the 2014–15 season, his third with Traktor, Kostitsyn was traded to the expansion club, Sochi on 29 October 2014.

On 1 June 2017, Kostitsyn continued his career in the KHL, signing a one-year deal with Chinese outfit, Kunlun Red Star.

After a further two seasons in his native Belarus with Dinamo Minsk, on 6 May 2020, Kostitsyn signed a one-year deal to continue in the KHL, with Russian team, HC Neftekhimik Nizhnekamsk.

== International play ==
Kostitsyn represented Belarus extensively at the under-18 and -20 levels. He first played internationally at the 2000 IIHF World U18 Championships as a fifteen-year-old, but Belarus would struggle in the top division, finishing last. The next year, Kostitsyn competed with Belarus' under-20 team in the 2001 World Junior Ice Hockey Championships' top division. Later that year, having been relegated for the 2001 IIHF World U18 Championships, Kostitsyn returned to record a tournament-leading 14 points in five games within the second-tier to win the Division I championship.

Kostitsyn made his second under-20 appearance at the 2002 World Junior Ice Hockey Championships and scored three goals to help Belarus stay in the top division. Later that year, Kostitsyn returned to the top division at the 2002 IIHF World U18 Championships, recording 10 points in eight games and helping lead Belarus to a fifth-place finish. Competing in his third under-20 tournament at the 2003 World Junior Ice Hockey Championships, Kostitsyn recorded two goals and one assist, but was relegated with Belarus to Division-I for 2004. Playing in the second-tier, he notched five goals and 10 points in five games to help Belarus return to the top division in 2005, where he scored five points in his fifth and final World Juniors.

In 2004, Kostitsyn had also made his senior international debut as a 19-year-old at the 2004 IIHF World Championship. He scored six points in five games. The following year in 2005 IIHF World Championship, however, he did not record a point in six games playing in the top division. Following his rookie season in the American Hockey League (AHL) in 2006, he played in his third consecutive World Championship and recorded five points in six games. At the 2008 IIHF World Championship, Kostitsyn recorded three points in five games.

On 23 December 2009, Kostitsyn was selected along with his younger brother Sergei, Mikhail Grabovski and Ruslan Salei as the only four current NHL players to represent Belarus in the 2010 Olympics.

== Career statistics ==
=== Regular season and playoffs ===
			Regular season					Playoffs
Season	Team	League	GP	G	A	Pts	PIM	GP	G	A	Pts	PIM
2000–01	Polimir Novopolotsk	BXL	1	2	1	3	2	—	—	—	—	—
2000–01	Polimir Novopolotsk	EEHL	5	1	0	1	0	—	—	—	—	—
2000–01	Yunost Minsk	BXL	3	1	4	5	8	—	—	—	—	—
2000–01	Khimik–ShVSM Vitebsk	BXL	17	17	6	23	42	—	—	—	—	—
2001–02	Polimir Novopolotsk	BXL	15	9	5	14	24	2	0	1	1	4
2001–02	Polimir Novopolotsk	EEHL	29	9	8	17	16	—	—	—	—	—
2001–02	Yunost Minsk	BXL	6	2	0	2	8	—	—	—	—	—
2002–03	Yunost Minsk	BXL	4	6	4	10	43	—	—	—	—	—
2002–03	Khimik Voskresensk	RUS.2	2	1	1	2	0	—	—	—	—	—
2002–03	CSKA Moscow	RSL	6	0	0	0	2	—	—	—	—	—
2002–03	CSKA–2 Moscow	RUS.3	3	2	2	4	25	—	—	—	—	—
2003–04	CSKA Moscow	RSL	12	0	1	1	2	—	—	—	—	—
2003–04	Yunost Minsk	BXL	2	0	2	2	14	6	4	4	8	16
2003–04	Yunost Minsk	EEHL B	1	0	1	1	2	—	—	—	—	—
2004–05	Hamilton Bulldogs	AHL	66	12	11	23	24	3	0	0	0	0
2005–06	Montreal Canadiens	NHL	12	2	1	3	2	—	—	—	—	—
2005–06	Hamilton Bulldogs	AHL	64	18	29	47	76	—	—	—	—	—
2006–07	Montreal Canadiens	NHL	22	1	10	11	6	—	—	—	—	—
2006–07	Hamilton Bulldogs	AHL	50	21	31	52	50	—	—	—	—	—
2007–08	Montreal Canadiens	NHL	78	26	27	53	29	12	5	3	8	2
2008–09	Montreal Canadiens	NHL	74	23	18	41	50	4	1	0	1	2
2009–10	Montreal Canadiens	NHL	59	15	18	33	32	19	3	5	8	12
2010–11	Montreal Canadiens	NHL	81	20	25	45	36	6	2	0	2	6
2011–12	Montreal Canadiens	NHL	53	12	12	24	16	—	—	—	—	—
2011–12	Nashville Predators	NHL	19	4	8	12	10	8	3	1	4	2
2012–13	Traktor Chelyabinsk	KHL	44	13	8	21	82	23	3	7	10	10
2013–14	Traktor Chelyabinsk	KHL	54	13	18	31	32	—	—	—	—	—
2014–15	Traktor Chelyabinsk	KHL	13	2	2	4	8	—	—	—	—	—
2014–15	HC Sochi	KHL	37	11	20	31	39	4	0	1	1	0
2015–16	Torpedo Nizhny Novgorod	KHL	9	0	2	2	16	—	—	—	—	—
2015–16	HC Sochi	KHL	45	20	19	39	49	4	0	0	0	0
2016–17	HC Sochi	KHL	51	16	18	34	49	—	—	—	—	—
2017–18	Kunlun Red Star	KHL	22	3	10	13	16	—	—	—	—	—
2018–19	Dinamo Minsk	KHL	50	14	14	28	28	—	—	—	—	—
2019–20	Dinamo Minsk	KHL	60	17	17	34	36	—	—	—	—	—
2020–21	Neftekhimik Nizhnekamsk	KHL	24	2	8	10	31	—	—	—	—	—
2020–21	HC Dynamo Pardubice	Czech	12	1	6	7	39	8	4	4	8	4
NHL totals			398	103	119	222	181	49	14	9	23	24
KHL totals			409	111	136	247	386	31	3	8	11	10

=== International ===
Year	Team	Event	GP	G	A	Pts	PIM
2000	Belarus	WJC18	6	0	0	0	4
2001	Belarus	WJC	6	0	0	0	2
2001	Belarus	WJC18 D1	5	7	7	14	8
2002	Belarus	WJC	6	3	0	3	0
2002	Belarus	WJC18	8	7	3	10	18
2003	Belarus	WJC	6	2	1	3	0
2003	Belarus	WJC18	6	6	9	15	28
2003	Belarus	WC	2	1	0	1	2
2004	Belarus	WJC D1	5	5	5	10	12
2004	Belarus	WC D1	5	3	3	6	0
2005	Belarus	WJC	5	1	4	5	6
2005	Belarus	WC	6	0	0	0	4
2006	Belarus	WC	6	1	4	5	6
2008	Belarus	WC	5	2	1	3	18
2011	Belarus	WC	5	3	4	7	4
2012	Belarus	WC	3	0	2	2	27
2014	Belarus	WC	7	0	0	0	4
2015	Belarus	WC	7	2	7	9	16
2016	Belarus	WC	7	0	1	1	4
2016	Belarus	OGQ	3	1	1	2	4
2017	Belarus	WC	4	0	2	2	0
Junior totals			53	31	29	60	78
Senior totals			60	13	25	38	89

Awards and achievements
Preceded by Chris Higgins	Montreal Canadiens first-round draft pick 2003	Succeeded by Kyle Chipchura
