= Sergei Kostitsyn =

Belarusian ice hockey player (born 1987)

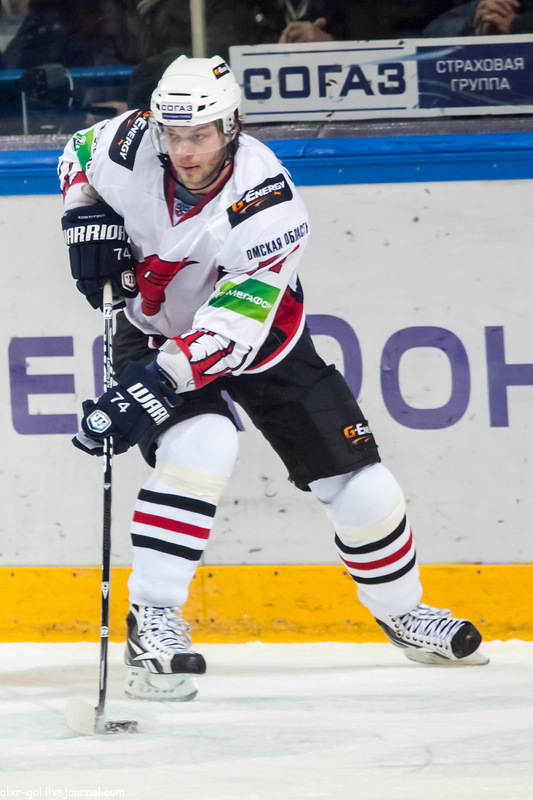
- Kostitsyn in 2013 with Avangard Omsk
- Born: 20 March 1987 (age 39) Novopolotsk, Byelorussian SSR, Soviet Union
- Height: 6 ft 0 in (183 cm)
- Weight: 205 lb (93 kg; 14 st 9 lb)
- Position: Winger
- Shoots: Left
- BHL team Former teams: Metallurg Zhlobin; Yunost Minsk; Gomel; Montreal Canadiens; Nashville Predators; Avangard Omsk; Ak Bars Kazan; Torpedo Nizhny Novgorod; Dinamo Minsk; Bratislava Capitals; Csíkszereda; Sokil Kyiv
- National team: Belarus
- NHL draft: 200th overall, 2005; Montreal Canadiens
- Playing career: 2007–present

Sergei Olegovich Kostitsyn (Belarusian: Сяргей Алегавiч Касціцын; Russian: Сергей Олегович Костицын; born 20 March 1987) is a Belarusian professional ice hockey winger for Metallurg Zhlobin of the Belarusian Extraleague (BHL). He was selected in the seventh round, 200th overall, by the Montreal Canadiens in the 2005 NHL entry draft. He has also played for the Nashville Predators of the National Hockey League (NHL) alongside his older brother Andrei.

== Playing career ==
=== Junior hockey ===
Like his older brother, Sergei excelled in the Belarusian junior hockey program. Sergei played for HK Gomel in Belarus in 2004–05 (14 points in 40 games) and was drafted in the Canadian Hockey League (CHL) Import Draft by the Ontario Hockey League (OHL)'s London Knights. Sergei was also drafted in the seventh round, 200th overall in the 2005 NHL entry draft by the Montreal Canadiens, the team that also had drafted Andrei in the first round (10th overall) in the 2003 NHL entry draft. He was traded to the Nashville Predators on 29 June 2010.

Kostitsyn moved to North America in 2005–06 to play with the Knights and recorded 26 goals, 52 assists and 78 points, leading all OHL rookies in scoring during the 2005–06 season. The 19-year-old was the second runner-up for the Emms Family Award, as OHL Rookie of the Year, behind Logan Couture of the Ottawa 67's and 15-year-old winner John Tavares of the Oshawa Generals. Sergei was instrumental in the London Knights' 2006 playoff run, which saw them lose to the Peterborough Petes in the OHL final. In his first ever OHL playoff game against the Sault Ste. Marie Greyhounds, Sergei had six points, a goal and five assists, in a 6–1 London win. In the semi-finals, Kostitsyn scored the series-clinching goal against the Guelph Storm, a power play goal in the first overtime of game five. The Knights named him the playoff performer of the year, finishing the post-season with 37 points in 19 games.

Joining the Canadiens' 2006–07 training camp, Kostitsyn was returned to London for a second OHL season. He was placed on a line with young superstars Patrick Kane and Sam Gagner and was named an alternate captain. Kostitsyn finished third in OHL and CHL scoring behind teammate Patrick Kane and Oshawa's John Tavares, tallying 40 goals and 131 points in only 59 games. His 91 assists led the CHL.

=== Montreal Canadiens ===
On 2 May 2007, Sergei Kostitsyn signed an amateur tryout contract with the Canadiens' AHL team, the Hamilton Bulldogs. However, after not being inserted in the lineup, he returned home to see his family. On 25 May, Kostitsyn signed with the Canadiens to a 3-year, entry-level contract.

Kostitsyn began the 2007–08 season with the Bulldogs. On 13 December 2007, while leading the Bulldogs in scoring, Kostitsyn was called up by the Canadiens. He played his first career NHL game against the Philadelphia Flyers on 13 December and played on the top-line with captain Saku Koivu and Chris Higgins. Sergei recorded his first career NHL point, an assist, in the next game, a 4–1 win against the Toronto Maple Leafs on 15 December. Five days later, in his fourth game on 20 December, Sergei scored his first career NHL goal, a power play marker in a 5–2 win against the Washington Capitals. He finished his rookie season with 27 points in 51 games and added eight points in 12 playoff games.

The following season, Kostitsyn was reassigned to Hamilton on 19 February 2009. He was called back up a little over a month later on 22 March. Prior to the 2009–10 season, Kostitsyn was cut from the lineup and assigned to Hamilton. On 30 September, he announced that he would not report to Hamilton and even asked to be traded. He was then suspended by the team. A few days later, Kostitsyn agreed to report to the Bulldogs in time for the start of the 2009–10 season. After four points in the first five games of the season, however, he left the team on 21 October and was consequently suspended a second time by the Canadiens. He finally decided to report once again to the Hamilton Bulldogs and after recording 13 points in 16 games with the Bulldogs, he was recalled by the Canadiens. On 7 May, Sergei was effectively cut from the Canadiens when Jacques Martin told the player to stay off the ice for the morning practice.

=== Nashville Predators ===
On 29 June 2010, Kostitsyn was sent to the Nashville Predators for goaltender Dan Ellis and forward Dustin Boyd in a trade involving future considerations. On 6 July, Kostitsyn signed a one-year deal with the Predators worth $550,000 that ran through the 2010–11 season. In the 2011–12 season, his second with the Predators, Kostitsyn scored his first career hat-trick on 1 January 2012.

On 4 July 2013, Kostitsyn was placed on waivers for the condition of a mutual termination of his contract with the Predators. On 6 July 2013, he signed a three-year contract to return to Avangard Omsk of the Kontinental Hockey League (KHL), his club during the 2012 NHL lockout.

=== KHL ===
In June 2014, Avangard Omsk traded Kostitsyn to Ak Bars Kazan in exchange for Konstantin Barulin.

In the 2015–16 season, he played for Torpedo Nizhny Novgorod before joining Dinamo Minsk for the 2016–17 season and then returned to Torpedo for the 2017–18 season.

On 3 May 2018, Kostitsyn signed a two-year contract as a free agent to return to his native Belarus, for a second stint with Dinamo Minsk of the KHL.

== International play ==
As a junior, Kostitsyn has participated in four World Under-17 tournaments, three World Junior Under-18 Championships, and two World Junior Championships, one of which was with his brother Andrei.

In the 2006 World Junior Championships, he was named best forward in Division I B, leading Belarus to a promotion to the top-tier. Playing in pool A in 2007, he scored a goal and two assists in the first game of the tournament, a 4–2 upset victory against Finland. He finished the tournament with 5 points in 6 games.

After his rookie season with the Canadiens, Kostitsyn competed in the 2008 IIHF World Championship with Belarus. He played in four games, recording one assist.

On 23 December 2009, Kostitsyn was selected along with his older brother Andrei, Mikhail Grabovski and Ruslan Salei as the only four current NHL players to represent Belarus in the 2010 Winter Olympics.

== Awards ==
- Named World Junior Championships Pool-B MVP in 2006.
- Named to the OHL First All-Rookie Team in 2006.
- Named the London Knights' top playoff performer in 2006.
- Named the London Knights' rookie of the year in 2006.

== Records ==
- London Knights single-season assists record – 91 in 2006–07

== Career statistics ==
=== Regular season and playoffs ===
			Regular season					Playoffs
Season	Team	League	GP	G	A	Pts	PIM	GP	G	A	Pts	PIM
2002–03	Yunost Minsk	BXL	1	0	0	0	0	—	—	—	—	—
2002–03	HK Gomel	BXL	8	1	3	4	4	1	0	0	0	0
2002–03	HK Gomel	EEHL	2	0	0	0	0	—	—	—	—	—
2002–03	HK Gomel II	BVL	25	22	27	49	66	—	—	—	—	—
2003–04	Yunior Minsk	BXL	3	0	0	0	0	—	—	—	—	—
2003–04	HK Gomel	BXL	22	5	4	9	4	11	1	2	3	8
2003–04	HK Gomel	EEHL	6	0	1	1	0	—	—	—	—	—
2003–04	HK Gomel II	BVL	17	13	16	29	66	—	—	—	—	—
2003–04	HK Gomel II	EEHL B	6	7	2	9	14	—	—	—	—	—
2004–05	HK Gomel	BXL	40	4	10	14	24	4	2	0	2	12
2004–05	HK Gomel II	BVL	6	2	3	5	34	—	—	—	—	—
2005–06	London Knights	OHL	63	26	52	78	78	19	13	24	37	44
2006–07	London Knights	OHL	59	40	91	131	76	16	9	12	21	39
2007–08	Hamilton Bulldogs	AHL	22	6	16	22	18	—	—	—	—	—
2007–08	Montreal Canadiens	NHL	52	9	18	27	51	12	3	5	8	14
2008–09	Montreal Canadiens	NHL	56	8	15	23	64	1	0	0	0	2
2008–09	Hamilton Bulldogs	AHL	16	5	8	13	18	—	—	—	—	—
2009–10	Hamilton Bulldogs	AHL	16	4	9	13	2	—	—	—	—	—
2009–10	Montreal Canadiens	NHL	47	7	11	18	8	5	0	0	0	0
2010–11	Nashville Predators	NHL	77	23	27	50	20	12	0	5	5	2
2011–12	Nashville Predators	NHL	75	17	26	43	34	10	1	1	2	4
2012–13	Avangard Omsk	KHL	27	9	19	28	42	—	—	—	—	—
2012–13	Nashville Predators	NHL	46	3	12	15	11	—	—	—	—	—
2013–14	Avangard Omsk	KHL	54	10	24	34	56	—	—	—	—	—
2014–15	Ak Bars Kazan	KHL	49	7	20	27	20	12	1	2	3	6
2015–16	Torpedo Nizhny Novgorod	KHL	51	10	10	20	40	11	2	2	4	16
2016–17	Dinamo Minsk	KHL	45	5	21	26	42	5	0	2	2	4
2017–18	Torpedo Nizhny Novgorod	KHL	43	7	7	14	14	4	1	0	1	0
2018–19	Dinamo Minsk	KHL	60	5	13	18	68	—	—	—	—	—
2020–21	Bratislava Capitals	ICEHL	14	1	3	4	0	5	2	2	4	0
NHL totals			353	67	109	176	188	40	4	11	15	22
KHL totals			329	53	114	167	282	32	4	6	10	26

=== International ===
Year	Team	Event	GP	G	A	Pts	PIM
2003	Belarus	WJC18	6	2	0	2	4
2004	Belarus	WJC D1	5	4	4	8	0
2004	Belarus	WJC18	6	1	3	4	8
2005	Belarus	WJC	6	0	0	0	2
2005	Belarus	WJC18 D1	4	1	5	6	4
2006	Belarus	WJC D1	5	4	5	9	43
2007	Belarus	WJC	6	1	4	5	33
2008	Belarus	WC	4	0	1	1	0
2010	Belarus	OG	4	2	3	5	0
2012	Belarus	WC	3	1	1	2	2
2014	Belarus	WC	8	4	4	8	10
2015	Belarus	WC	8	1	6	7	8
2016	Belarus	WC	7	0	2	2	4
2016	Belarus	OGQ	3	2	4	6	0
2017	Belarus	WC	6	0	2	2	6
2021	Belarus	WC	5	0	2	2	2
Junior totals			38	13	21	34	94
Senior totals			48	10	25	35	32
