= 2007–08 New York Rangers season =

NHL hockey team season

2007–08 New York Rangers
- Division: 3rd Atlantic
- Conference: 5th Eastern
- 2007–08 record: 42–27–13
- Home record: 25–13–3
- Road record: 17–14–10
- Goals for: 213
- Goals against: 199

Team information
- General manager: Glen Sather
- Coach: Tom Renney
- Captain: Jaromir Jagr
- Alternate captains: Brendan Shanahan; Martin Straka
- Arena: Madison Square Garden
- Average attendance: 18,200 (100%)

Team leaders
- Goals: Chris Drury (25); Jaromir Jagr (25)
- Assists: Scott Gomez (54)
- Points: Jaromir Jagr (71)
- Penalty minutes: Colton Orr (159)
- Plus/minus: Nigel Dawes (+11)
- Wins: Henrik Lundqvist (37)
- Goals against average: Henrik Lundqvist (2.23)

The 2007–08 New York Rangers season was the franchise's 81st season of play and their 82nd season overall in the National Hockey League (NHL). An impressive late season run in 2006–07 brought the team from 12th to 6th place in the Eastern Conference, but the team ran out of steam in the Conference Semifinals before losing in six games to the Buffalo Sabres.

== Offseason ==
The off-season began in late June with the 2007 NHL entry draft in Columbus, Ohio. The Rangers had the 17th overall pick in the first round, yet came away with Russian superstar Alexei Cherepanov, despite Cherepanov being considered by many rankings to be a top five prospect, and the top European available in the draft. A variety of reasons have been postulated for Cherepanov's drop, most notably, the lack of a new transfer agreement between the NHL and the International Ice Hockey Federation (IIHF) concerning players from Russia. In the second round, the Rangers selected goaltender Antoine Lafleur from the P.E.I. Rocket of the QMJHL. Lafleur was ranked #3 among North American goaltenders by NHL Central Scouting.

The Rangers made a tremendous splash on July 1, the first day of free agency. Within a 30-minute span on that Sunday evening, the Rangers announced the signings of the two most coveted centers available: Scott Gomez from the rival New Jersey Devils and Chris Drury from the Buffalo Sabres. As both players had worn number 23 with their previous teams, general manager Glen Sather flipped a puck at their introductory press conference to determine who would wear number 23 on the Rangers; the winner was Drury.

After these signings, left out of the picture was center Michael Nylander, who had reportedly signed with the Edmonton Oilers, but then actually signed with the Washington Capitals. In addition, the Rangers also lost Jed Ortmeyer, Brad Isbister, Karel Rachunek and Kevin Weekes to the free agency market, the latter two signing with the rival New Jersey Devils.

The Rangers re-signed a number of their own free agents, including Jason Strudwick, Petr Prucha and Brendan Shanahan. Goaltender Henrik Lundqvist and forward Marcel Hossa had been designated for salary arbitration, but both signed contracts before reaching their respective hearings. Sean Avery did go through arbitration and was awarded a one-year deal worth $1.9 million.

The multitude of high-profile free agent signings in July left the Rangers dangerously close to the league's $50.3 million salary cap. This effectively forced the Rangers to deal Matt Cullen and his $2.875 million per year cap number back to the Carolina Hurricanes. At the start of the season, the Rangers total cap number was over the league maximum, but player bonuses can be deferred to the next season if it causes a team to exceed the upper limit of the salary cap, so the Rangers were in compliance.

== Regular season ==
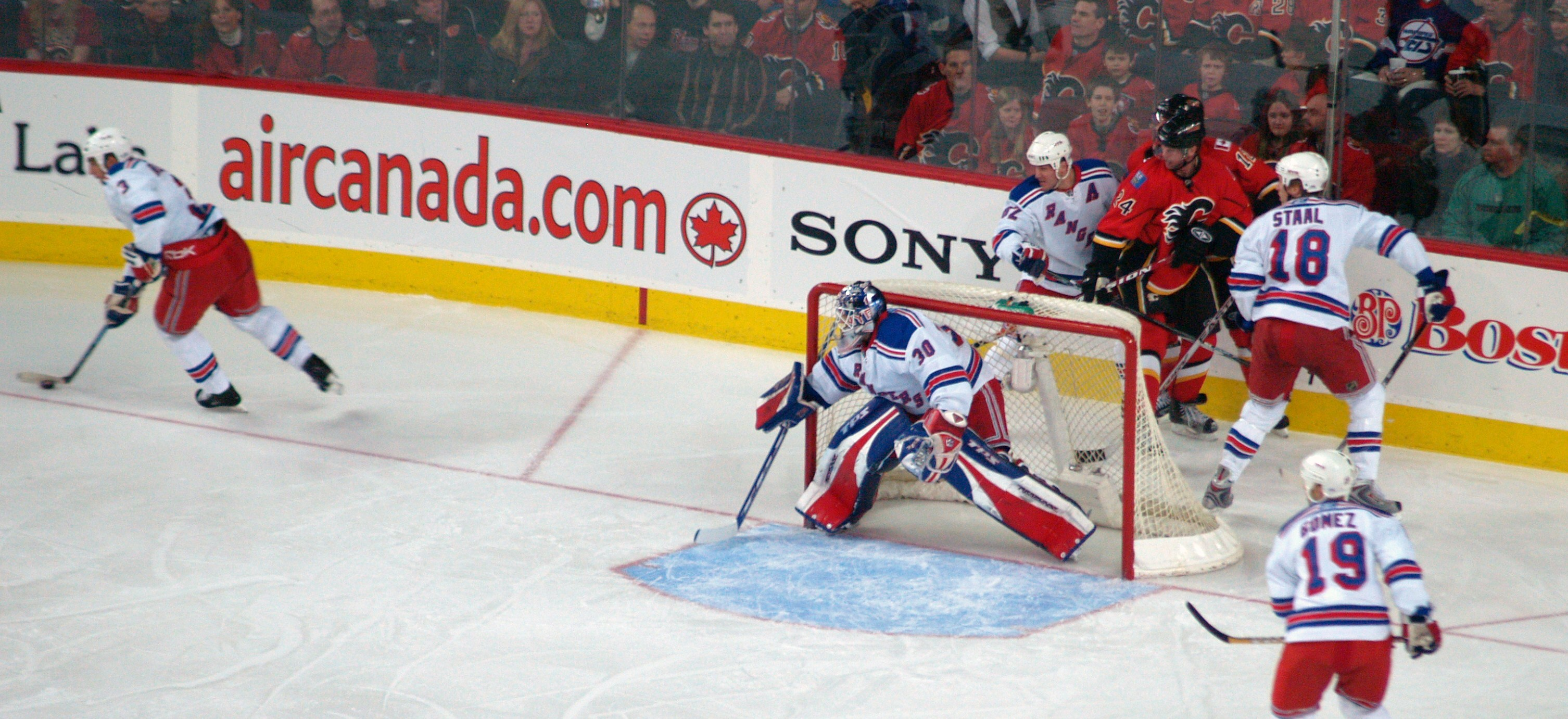
Action of a January 2008 game in Calgary against the Flames.

The Rangers had the most shutouts of all 30 teams in the League, with 12.

On April 3, 2008, the New York Rangers clinched a playoff berth for the third consecutive season in a 3–0 win against their crosstown rival Islanders.

=== Divisional standings ===
Atlantic Division
		GP	W	L	OTL	GF	GA	Pts
**1**	**Pittsburgh Penguins**	**82**	**47**	**27**	**8**	**247**	**216**	**102**
**2**	**New Jersey Devils**	**82**	**46**	**29**	**7**	**206**	**197**	**99**
**3**	**New York Rangers**	**82**	**42**	**27**	**13**	**213**	**199**	**97**
**4**	**Philadelphia Flyers**	**82**	**42**	**29**	**11**	**248**	**233**	**95**
5	New York Islanders	82	35	38	9	194	243	79

=== Conference standings ===
Eastern Conference
R		Div	GP	W	L	OTL	GF	GA	Pts
**1**	**z – Montreal Canadiens**	**NE**	**82**	**47**	**25**	**10**	**262**	**222**	104
**2**	**y – Pittsburgh Penguins**	**AT**	**82**	**47**	**27**	**8**	**247**	**216**	102
**3**	**y – Washington Capitals**	**SE**	**82**	**43**	**31**	**8**	**242**	**231**	94
**4**	**New Jersey Devils**	**AT**	**82**	**46**	**29**	**7**	**206**	**197**	99
**5**	**New York Rangers**	**AT**	**82**	**42**	**27**	**13**	**213**	**199**	97
**6**	**Philadelphia Flyers**	**AT**	**82**	**42**	**29**	**11**	**248**	**233**	95
**7**	**Ottawa Senators**	**NE**	**82**	**43**	**31**	**8**	**261**	**247**	94
**8**	**Boston Bruins**	**NE**	**82**	**41**	**29**	**12**	**212**	**222**	94
8.5
9	Carolina Hurricanes	SE	82	43	33	6	252	249	92
10	Buffalo Sabres	NE	82	39	31	12	255	242	90
11	Florida Panthers	SE	82	38	35	9	216	226	85
12	Toronto Maple Leafs	NE	82	36	35	11	231	260	83
13	New York Islanders	AT	82	35	38	9	194	243	79
14	Atlanta Thrashers	SE	82	34	40	8	216	272	76
15	Tampa Bay Lightning	SE	82	31	42	9	223	267	71

Divisions: AT – Atlantic, NE – Northeast, SE – Southeast

bold – qualified for playoffs, y – division winner, z – placed first in conference (and division)

== Playoffs ==
The New York Rangers ended the 2007–08 regular season as the Eastern Conference's fifth seed.

The Rangers defeated the New Jersey Devils in the Eastern Conference Quarterfinals in five games. This was the fifth playoff meeting between the two clubs, with the Rangers having won four of those series. The lone Devils series win was in 2006. They were eventually eliminated in the Eastern Conference Semifinals by the Pittsburgh Penguins in five games.

== Schedule and results ==
=== Regular season ===
2007–08 regular season
October: 4–6–1 (home: 4–2–0; road: 0–4–1)

Game	Date	Opponent	Score	Decision	Record	Recap
1	October 4	Florida Panthers	5–2	Lundqvist	1–0–0	W
2	October 6	@ Ottawa Senators	2–0	Lundqvist	1–1–0	L
3	October 10	@ New York Islanders	2–1	Lundqvist	1–2–0	L
4	October 12	Washington Capitals	3–1	Lundqvist	2–2–0	W
5	October 13	Ottawa Senators	3–1	Lundqvist	2–3–0	L
6	October 18	@ Atlanta Thrashers	5–3	Lundqvist	2–4–0	L
7	October 20	@ Boston Bruins	1–0 SO	Lundqvist	2–4–1	OTL
8	October 23	@ Pittsburgh Penguins	1–0	Lundqvist	2–5–1	L
9	October 25	New Jersey Devils	2–0	Lundqvist	3–5–1	W
10	October 27	Toronto Maple Leafs	4–1	Lundqvist	3–6–1	L
11	October 29	Tampa Bay Lightning	3–1	Lundqvist	4–6–1	W

November: 10–3–1 (home: 5–2–0; road: 5–1–1)

Game	Date	Opponent	Score	Decision	Record	Recap
12	November 1	Washington Capitals	2–0	Lundqvist	5–6–1	W
13	November 3	New Jersey Devils	2–1 SO	Lundqvist	6–6–1	W
14	November 5	Philadelphia Flyers	2–0	Lundqvist	7–6–1	W
15	November 6	@ New York Islanders	3–2	Lundqvist	7–7–1	L
16	November 8	Pittsburgh Penguins	4–2	Lundqvist	8–7–1	W
17	November 10	@ Toronto Maple Leafs	3–2 SO	Valiquette	9–7–1	W
18	November 14	@ New Jersey Devils	4–2	Lundqvist	10–7–1	W
19	November 15	@ Philadelphia Flyers	4–3 SO	Lundqvist	11–7–1	W
20	November 17	@ Pittsburgh Penguins	4–3 OT	Lundqvist	12–7–1	W
21	November 19	New York Islanders	2–1	Lundqvist	12–8–1	L
22	November 21	@ Tampa Bay Lightning	2–1	Lundqvist	13–8–1	W
23	November 23	@ Florida Panthers	3–2 SO	Valiquette	13–8–2	OTL
24	November 25	Dallas Stars	3–2	Lundqvist	13–9–2	L
25	November 29	New York Islanders	4–2	Lundqvist	14–9–2	W

December: 6–6–2 (home: 4–4–0; road: 2–2–2)

Game	Date	Opponent	Score	Decision	Record	Recap
26	December 1	@ Ottawa Senators	5–2	Lundqvist	15–9–2	W
27	December 3	Carolina Hurricanes	4–0	Lundqvist	15–10–2	L
28	December 6	Toronto Maple Leafs	6–2	Lundqvist	15–11–2	L
29	December 7	@ Atlanta Thrashers	4–2	Valiquette	15–12–2	L
30	December 9	New Jersey Devils	1–0 OT	Lundqvist	16–12–2	W
31	December 12	@ Washington Capitals	5–4 OT	Lundqvist	16–12–3	OTL
32	December 16	Phoenix Coyotes	5–1	Valiquette	16–13–3	L
33	December 18	Pittsburgh Penguins	4–0	Lundqvist	17–13–3	W
34	December 20	@ Minnesota Wild	6–3	Lundqvist	17–14–3	L
35	December 21	@ Colorado Avalanche	4–3 OT	Lundqvist	17–14–4	OTL
36	December 23	Ottawa Senators	3–1	Lundqvist	17–15–4	L
37	December 26	Carolina Hurricanes	4–2	Lundqvist	18–15–4	W
38	December 29	@ Toronto Maple Leafs	6–1	Valiquette	19–15–4	W
39	December 30	Montreal Canadiens	4–3 OT	Lundqvist	20–15–4	W

January: 5–7–2 (home: 4–3–0; road: 1–4–2)

Game	Date	Opponent	Score	Decision	Record	Recap
40	January 2	@ Calgary Flames	4–3	Lundqvist	20–16–4	L
41	January 3	@ Vancouver Canucks	3–0	Valiquette	20–17–4	L
42	January 5	@ Edmonton Oilers	3–2 SO	Lundqvist	20–17–5	OTL
43	January 8	Tampa Bay Lightning	5–3	Lundqvist	20–18–5	L
44	January 10	Philadelphia Flyers	6–2	Lundqvist	20–19–5	L
45	January 12	Montreal Canadiens	4–1	Lundqvist	21–19–5	W
46	January 14	@ Pittsburgh Penguins	4–1	Lundqvist	21–20–5	L
47	January 16	Buffalo Sabres	2–1	Lundqvist	22–20–5	W
48	January 19	@ Boston Bruins	4–3 SO	Lundqvist	22–20–6	OTL
49	January 20	Boston Bruins	3–1	Lundqvist	22–21–6	L
50	January 22	Atlanta Thrashers	4–0	Lundqvist	23–21–6	W
51	January 24	Atlanta Thrashers	2–1 SO	Lundqvist	24–21–6	W
52	January 29	@ Carolina Hurricanes	3–1	Lundqvist	24–22–6	L
53	January 31	@ Philadelphia Flyers	4–0	Valiquette	25–22–6	W

February: 8–2–2 (home: 3–2–0; road: 5–0–2)

Game	Date	Opponent	Score	Decision	Record	Recap
54	February 1	@ New Jersey Devils	3–1	Lundqvist	26–22–6	W
55	February 3	@ Montreal Canadiens	5–3	Lundqvist	27–22–6	W
56	February 5	Los Angeles Kings	4–2	Lundqvist	27–23–6	L
57	February 7	Anaheim Ducks	4–1	Lundqvist	27–24–6	L
58	February 9	@ Philadelphia Flyers	2–0	Valiquette	28–24–6	W
59	February 10	@ Washington Capitals	3–2 OT	Valiquette	28–24–7	OTL
60	February 16	Buffalo Sabres	5–1	Lundqvist	29–24–7	W
61	February 17	San Jose Sharks	3–1	Lundqvist	30–24–7	W
62	February 19	@ Montreal Canadiens	6–5 SO	Lundqvist	30–24–8	OTL
63	February 23	@ Buffalo Sabres	4–3	Lundqvist	31–24–8	W
64	February 24	Florida Panthers	5–0	Lundqvist	32–24–8	W
65	February 28	@ Carolina Hurricanes	4–2	Lundqvist	33–24–8	W

March: 8–3–3 (home: 5–0–2; road: 3–3–1)

Game	Date	Opponent	Score	Decision	Record	Recap
66	March 2	Philadelphia Flyers	5–4 SO	Valiquette	34–24–8	W
67	March 4	New York Islanders	4–3 SO	Lundqvist	34–24–9	OTL
68	March 6	@ New York Islanders	4–1	Lundqvist	35–24–9	W
69	March 9	Boston Bruins	1–0 SO	Lundqvist	36–24–9	W
70	March 10	@ Buffalo Sabres	3–2 SO	Lundqvist	37–24–9	W
71	March 14	@ Florida Panthers	3–2	Lundqvist	37–25–9	L
72	March 15	@ Tampa Bay Lightning	3–0	Lundqvist	37–26–9	L
73	March 18	Pittsburgh Penguins	5–2	Lundqvist	38–26–9	W
74	March 19	@ New Jersey Devils	2–1 SO	Lundqvist	39–26–9	W
75	March 21	@ Philadelphia Flyers	4–3 SO	Valiquette	39–26–10	OTL
76	March 25	Philadelphia Flyers	2–1 OT	Lundqvist	39–26–11	OTL
77	March 27	New Jersey Devils	3–2	Lundqvist	40–26–11	W
78	March 30	@ Pittsburgh Penguins	3–1	Lundqvist	40–27–11	L
79	March 31	Pittsburgh Penguins	2–1 OT	Lundqvist	41–27–11	W

April: 1–0–2 (home: 0–0–1; road: 1–0–1)

Game	Date	Opponent	Score	Decision	Record	Recap
80	April 3	@ New York Islanders	3–0	Lundqvist	42–27–11	W
81	April 4	New York Islanders	4–3 SO	Lundqvist	42–27–12	OTL
82	April 6	@ New Jersey Devils	3–2 SO	Lundqvist	42–27–13	OTL

Legend: W Win (2 points) L Loss (0 points) OTL Overtime/shootout loss (1 point)

=== Playoffs ===
2008 Stanley Cup playoffs
Eastern Conference Quarterfinals vs. (4) New Jersey Devils – Rangers win 4–1

Game	Date	Visitor	Score	Home	OT	Series	Recap
1	April 9	New York Rangers	4–1	New Jersey Devils		Rangers lead series 1–0	W
2	April 11	New York Rangers	2–1	New Jersey Devils		Rangers lead series 2–0	W
3	April 13	New Jersey Devils	4–3	New York Rangers	OT	Rangers lead series 2–1	L
4	April 16	New Jersey Devils	3–5	New York Rangers		Rangers lead series 3–1	W
5	April 18	New York Rangers	5–3	New Jersey Devils		Rangers win series 4–1	W

Eastern Conference Semifinals vs. (2) Pittsburgh Penguins – Penguins win 4–1

Game	Date	Visitor	Score	Home	OT	Series	Recap
1	April 25	New York Rangers	4–5	Pittsburgh Penguins		Pittsburgh leads series 1–0	L
2	April 27	New York Rangers	0–2	Pittsburgh Penguins		Pittsburgh leads series 2–0	L
3	April 29	Pittsburgh Penguins	5–3	New York Rangers		Pittsburgh leads series 3–0	L
4	May 1	Pittsburgh Penguins	0–3	New York Rangers		Pittsburgh leads series 3–1	W
5	May 4	New York Rangers	2–3	Pittsburgh Penguins	OT	Pittsburgh wins series 4–1	L

Legend: W Win L Loss

== Player statistics ==
Skaters

Regular season
Player	GP	G	A	Pts	+/−	PIM
Jaromir Jagr	82	25	46	71	8	58
Scott Gomez	81	16	54	70	3	36
Chris Drury	82	25	33	58	−3	45
Brendan Shanahan	73	23	23	46	−2	35
Martin Straka	65	14	27	41	5	22
Brandon Dubinsky	82	14	26	40	8	79
Michal Roszival	80	13	25	38	0	80
Sean Avery	57	15	18	33	6	154
Nigel Dawes	61	14	15	29	11	10
Dan Girardi	82	10	18	28	0	14
Fedor Tyutin	82	5	15	20	5	43
Paul Mara	61	1	16	17	1	52
Petr Prucha	62	7	10	17	3	22
Ryan Callahan	52	8	5	13	7	31
Marek Malik	42	2	8	10	7	48
Marc Staal	80	2	8	10	2	42
Marcel Hossa^{‡}	36	1	7	8	8	24
Christian Backman^{†}	18	2	6	8	2	20
Blair Betts	75	2	5	7	−4	20
Ryan Hollweg	70	2	2	4	−12	96
Jason Strudwick	52	1	1	2	0	40
Fredrik Sjostrom^{†}	18	2	0	2	0	8
Colton Orr	74	1	1	2	−13	159
Ivan Baranka	1	0	1	1	1	0
Thomas Pock	1	0	0	0	−2	0
Dane Byers	1	0	0	0	−1	0
Greg Moore	6	0	0	0	−2	0

Playoffs
Player	GP	G	A	Pts	+/−	PIM
Jaromir Jagr	10	5	10	15	3	12
Scott Gomez	10	4	7	11	5	8
Martin Straka	10	3	7	10	2	16
Brandon Dubinsky	10	4	4	8	2	12
Sean Avery	8	4	3	7	3	6
Chris Drury	10	3	3	6	3	8
Michal Rozsival	10	1	5	6	4	10
Brendan Shanahan	10	1	4	5	0	8
Nigel Dawes	10	2	2	4	3	0
Ryan Callahan	10	2	2	4	3	10
Fedor Tyutin	10	0	3	3	−1	4
Marc Staal	10	1	2	3	4	8
Dan Girardi	10	0	3	3	1	6
Paul Mara	10	0	1	1	3	20
Fredrik Sjostrom	10	0	1	1	0	2
Lauri Korpikoski	1	1	0	1	1	0
Jason Strudwick	2	0	0	0	0	0
Christian Backman	8	0	0	0	3	12
Blair Betts	8	0	0	0	−4	2
Colton Orr	2	0	0	0	0	0
Ryan Hollweg	8	0	0	0	−2	2
Petr Prucha	3	0	0	0	0	0

Goaltenders

Regular season
Player	GP	TOI	W	L	OT	GA	GAA	SA	SV%	SO	G	A	PIM
Henrik Lundqvist	72	4305	37	24	10	160	2.23	1823	.912	10	0	0	2
Steve Valiquette	13	686	5	3	3	25	2.19	296	.916	2	0	0	2

Playoffs
Player	GP	TOI	W	L	GA	GAA	SA	SV%	SO
Henrik Lundqvist	10	608	5	5	26	2.57	287	.909	1

^{†}Denotes player spent time with another team before joining Rangers. Stats reflect time with Rangers only.
^{‡}Traded mid-season. Stats reflect time with Rangers only.

== Awards and records ==
=== Milestones ===
Regular season
Player	Milestone	Reached
Marc Staal	1st NHL game	October 4, 2007
Michal Roszival	400th NHL game	October 4, 2007
Colton Orr	200th NHL PIM	October 6, 2007
Paul Mara	500th NHL PIM	October 12, 2007
Dan Girardi	1st NHL goal	October 18, 2007
Jaromir Jagr	1200th NHL game	October 25, 2007
Brandon Dubinsky	1st NHL assist 1st NHL point	October 25, 2007
Colton Orr	100th NHL game	October 29, 2007
Brendan Shanahan	1300th NHL point	October 29, 2007
Marc Staal	1st NHL assist 1st NHL point	November 1, 2007
Nigel Dawes	1st NHL assist	November 8, 2007
Brandon Dubinsky	1st NHL goal	November 8, 2007
Tom Renney	100th Rangers win	November 10, 2007
Blair Betts; Marcel Hossa	200th NHL game	November 10, 2007
Marc Staal	1st NHL goal	November 14, 2007
Ivan Baranka	1st NHL game 1st NHL assist 1st NHL point	November 21, 2007
Greg Moore	1st NHL game	November 21, 2007
Martin Straka	900th NHL game	December 6, 2007
Chris Drury	200th NHL goal	December 7, 2007
Petr Prucha	100th NHL point	January 16, 2008
Stephen Valiquette	1st NHL shutout	January 31, 2008
Scott Gomez	500th NHL point	February 1, 2008
Chris Drury	500th NHL point	February 1, 2008
Dane Byers	1st NHL game	February 5, 2008
Martin Straka	700th NHL point	February 16, 2008
Dan Girardi	100th NHL game	March 4, 2008
Sean Avery	100th NHL assist	March 14, 2008
Chris Drury	700th NHL game	March 15, 2008
Henrik Lundqvist	100th NHL win	March 18, 2008
Chris Drury	300th NHL assist	March 27, 2008
Ryan Hollweg	200th NHL game	April 4, 2008

Playoffs
Player	Milestone	Reached
Brandon Dubinsky; Marc Staal; Fredrik Sjostrom	1st NHL playoff game	April 9, 2008
Nigel Dawes	1st NHL playoff goal	April 9, 2008
Brandon Dubinsky	1st NHL playoff goal	April 13, 2008
Scott Gomez	100th NHL playoff game	April 13, 2008
Marc Staal	1st NHL playoff goal	April 16, 2008
Lauri Korpikoski	1st NHL playoff game 1st NHL playoff goal 1st NHL playoff point	May 4, 2008

== Transactions ==
The Rangers have been involved in the following transactions during the 2007–08 season.

=== Trades ===
July 4, 2007	To Tampa Bay Lightning Bryce Lampman	To New York Rangers Mitch Fritz
July 17, 2007	To Carolina Hurricanes Matt Cullen	To New York Rangers Andrew Hutchinson; Joe Barnes; 3rd-round pick in 2008
October 11, 2007	To Chicago Blackhawks Conditional 7th-round pick in 2008.	To New York Rangers P. A. Parenteau
February 26, 2008	To St. Louis Blues 4th-round pick in 2008	To New York Rangers Christian Backman
February 26, 2008	To Phoenix Coyotes Al Montoya; Marcel Hossa	To New York Rangers David LeNeveu; Fredrik Sjostrom; Josh Gratton; 5th-round pick in 2009

=== Free agents acquired ===
Player	Former team	Contract terms
Scott Gomez	New Jersey Devils	seven years, $51.5 million
Chris Drury	Buffalo Sabres	five years, $35.25 million

=== Free agents lost ===
Player	New team	Contract terms
Jed Ortmeyer	Nashville Predators	two years, $1.5 million
Michael Nylander	Washington Capitals	four years, $19.5 million
Brad Isbister	Vancouver Canucks	one year, $525,000
Karel Rachunek	New Jersey Devils	one year, $1.4 million
Kevin Weekes	New Jersey Devils	two years, $1.375 million

=== Player signings ===
Player	Contract terms
Jason Strudwick	one year, $500,000
Petr Prucha	two years, $3.2 million
Brendan Shanahan	one year, $2.5 million
Henrik Lundqvist	one year, $4.25 million
Marcel Hossa	one year, $780,000
Sean Avery	one year, $1.9 million*
Henrik Lundqvist	six years, $41.25 million
Daniel Girardi	two years, $3.1 million
Fedor Tyutin	four years, $11.4 million

* Sean Avery re-signed through salary arbitration.

== Draft picks ==
New York's picks at the 2007 NHL entry draft in Columbus, Ohio, at the Nationwide Arena.

Round	#	Player	Position	Nationality	College/junior/club team (league)
1	17	Alexei Cherepanov	RW	Russia	Avangard Omsk (RSL)
2	48	Antoine Lafleur	G	Canada	P.E.I. Rocket (QMJHL)
5	138	Max Campbell	C	Canada	Strathroy Rockets (WOHL)
6	168	Carl Hagelin	LW	Sweden	Södertälje SK (J20 SuperElit)
7	193	David Skokan	C	Slovakia	Rimouski Océanic (QMJHL)
7	198	Danny Hobbs	F	Canada	Ohio Junior Blue Jackets (USHL)

== Farm teams ==
=== Hartford Wolf Pack (AHL) ===
The 2007–08 season was the 11th season of AHL hockey for the franchise. The team's status as the Rangers' highest-level minor-league affiliate became questionable when Northland AEG LLC purchased the Hartford Civic Center from Madison Square Garden, L.P.; however, on May 29, 2007, it was announced that the franchise will remain in Hartford and will remain affiliated with the Rangers.

Hartford finished the regular season with a record of 50–20–2–8 for a total of 110 points, a franchise high. P. A. Parenteau led the team with 81 points in 75 games, and team captain Andrew Hutchinson won the Eddie Shore Award as the league's top defenseman.

Portland eliminated Hartford from the playoffs in 5 games, marking two consecutive season's that the Wolf Pack failed to advance past the 1st round.

=== Charlotte Checkers (ECHL) ===
The 2007–08 season was the 15th season of ECHL hockey for the franchise.

Charlotte finished the regular season with a record of 34–31–1–6 for a total of 75 points. Gwinnett eliminated the Checkers from the playoffs in 3 games.

== See also ==
- 2007–08 NHL season
