= 2007–08 Buffalo Sabres season =

NHL hockey team season

2007–08 Buffalo Sabres
- Division: 4th Northeast
- Conference: 10th Eastern
- 2007–08 record: 39–31–12
- Home record: 20–15–6
- Road record: 19–16–6
- Goals for: 255
- Goals against: 242

Team information
- General manager: Darcy Regier
- Coach: Lindy Ruff
- Captain: Rotating; Jochen Hecht (Oct, Feb); Toni Lydman (Nov); Brian Campbell (Dec); Jaroslav Spacek (Jan); Jason Pominville (Mar-Apr)
- Alternate captains: Rotating; Toni Lydman (Oct); Henrik Tallinder (Oct); Brian Campbell (Nov, Feb); Jochen Hecht (Nov-Jan); Jaroslav Spacek (Dec, Mar-Apr); Jason Pominville (Jan); Adam Mair (Feb); Tim Connolly (Feb); Derek Roy (Mar-Apr)
- Arena: HSBC Arena; Ralph Wilson Stadium (1 game)
- Average attendance: 18,668 (99.9%)

Team leaders
- Goals: Thomas Vanek (36)
- Assists: Jason Pominville (53)
- Points: Derek Roy (81)
- Penalty minutes: Andrew Peters (100)
- Plus/minus: Jason Pominville (+16)
- Wins: Ryan Miller (36)
- Goals against average: Ryan Miller (2.64)

The 2007–08 Buffalo Sabres season was the 38th season of operation, 37th season of play, for the National Hockey League (NHL) franchise that was established on May 22, 1970.

Prior to the season, the Sabres lost their co-captains of the previous two seasons, Daniel Briere and Chris Drury. Briere and Drury were signed as free agents on July 1 by the Philadelphia Flyers and New York Rangers, respectively. Dainius Zubrus was also lost to free agency, as he was signed by the New Jersey Devils on July 3. Thomas Vanek, who led the team in goals the previous season with 43, was a restricted free agent and was almost lost as well; the Edmonton Oilers signed him to a seven-year, $50 million offer sheet on July 6, but the Sabres matched the offer, retaining him.

Jocelyn Thibault was signed to the Sabres' roster on July 5 to serve as a veteran backup to the team's starting goaltender, Ryan Miller. Thibault replaced Ty Conklin, who had served as Miller's backup for the last month of the 2006–07 season and during the playoffs. Conklin was signed by the Pittsburgh Penguins on July 18.

After losing both Briere and Drury in the off-season, the Sabres' captaincy was vacated. Prior to the season, the team announced that it would rotate captaincy throughout the season, just as it did during the 2003–04 season. Jochen Hecht was named the October captain under this system. Toni Lydman was named captain for November, Brian Campbell was named captain for December, and Jaroslav Spacek was named captain for January before the captaincy was cycled back to Hecht in February. Jason Pominville was named the team's captain in March, and he finished the season in the role.

Longtime Sabres' color commentator Jim Lorentz retired just prior to the season. He was replaced in the broadcast booth by longtime Hockey Night in Canada broadcaster Harry Neale.

The Sabres' January 1 home game against the Pittsburgh Penguins was played outdoors at Ralph Wilson Stadium, home of the National Football League's Buffalo Bills. The NHL called the event the AMP Energy NHL Winter Classic. In addition to selling tickets at Ralph Wilson Stadium, the Sabres also sold tickets to HSBC Arena for the game, which was broadcast for fans on the arena's video scoreboard.

Brian Campbell was the Sabres' lone representative in the 2008 NHL All-Star Game, as he was named to the team as a reserve defenseman. It was his second consecutive All-Star Game appearance. Campbell was then traded to the San Jose Sharks on February 26 in exchange for Steve Bernier and a first-round pick in the 2008 NHL entry draft.

== Regular season ==
On December 22, the Sabres won their first shootout victory of the season on the road in Philadelphia against the Philadelphia Flyers. Thomas Vanek scored with 7.2 seconds left in the third period, beating former Sabres goaltender Martin Biron from the right circle to force overtime, and Ales Kotalik of the Sabres scored the only shootout goal to provide the Sabres with a win, adding to their total with six victories in a row.

On January 18, 2008, the Sabres defeated the Atlanta Thrashers at home by a score of 10–1. Derek Roy and Drew Stafford each had a hat-trick. It was the first time that an NHL team had scored 10 goals in a regular season game since January 4, 2007, when the Toronto Maple Leafs defeated the Boston Bruins on the road by a score of 10–2. It was also the first time that the Sabres had scored 10 goals in a game since January 14, 2006, when they defeated the Los Angeles Kings at home by a score of 10–1. Coincidentally, two Sabres had hat-tricks in that game as well: Jochen Hecht and Jason Pominville.

After winning the Presidents' Trophy in the 2006–07 NHL season, the Sabres failed to qualify for the playoffs for the first time since the 2003–04 NHL season despite having 90 points.

=== Divisional standings ===
Northeast Division
| | | GP | W | L | OTL | GF | GA | Pts |
|---|---|---|---|---|---|---|---|---|
| **1** | **Montreal Canadiens** | **82** | **47** | **25** | **10** | **262** | **222** | **104** |
| **2** | **Ottawa Senators** | **82** | **43** | **31** | **8** | **261** | **247** | **94** |
| **3** | **Boston Bruins** | **82** | **41** | **29** | **12** | **212** | **222** | **94** |
| 4 | Buffalo Sabres | 82 | 39 | 31 | 12 | 255 | 242 | 90 |
| 5 | Toronto Maple Leafs | 82 | 36 | 35 | 11 | 231 | 260 | 83 |

=== Conference standings ===
Eastern Conference
| R | | Div | GP | W | L | OTL | GF | GA | Pts |
|---|---|---|---|---|---|---|---|---|---|
| **1** | **z – Montreal Canadiens** | **NE** | **82** | **47** | **25** | **10** | **262** | **222** | 104 |
| **2** | **y – Pittsburgh Penguins** | **AT** | **82** | **47** | **27** | **8** | **247** | **216** | 102 |
| **3** | **y – Washington Capitals** | **SE** | **82** | **43** | **31** | **8** | **242** | **231** | 94 |
| **4** | **New Jersey Devils** | **AT** | **82** | **46** | **29** | **7** | **206** | **197** | 99 |
| **5** | **New York Rangers** | **AT** | **82** | **42** | **27** | **13** | **213** | **199** | 97 |
| **6** | **Philadelphia Flyers** | **AT** | **82** | **42** | **29** | **11** | **248** | **233** | 95 |
| **7** | **Ottawa Senators** | **NE** | **82** | **43** | **31** | **8** | **261** | **247** | 94 |
| **8** | **Boston Bruins** | **NE** | **82** | **41** | **29** | **12** | **212** | **222** | 94 |
8.5
| 9 | Carolina Hurricanes | SE | 82 | 43 | 33 | 6 | 252 | 249 | 92 |
| 10 | Buffalo Sabres | NE | 82 | 39 | 31 | 12 | 255 | 242 | 90 |
| 11 | Florida Panthers | SE | 82 | 38 | 35 | 9 | 216 | 226 | 85 |
| 12 | Toronto Maple Leafs | NE | 82 | 36 | 35 | 11 | 231 | 260 | 83 |
| 13 | New York Islanders | AT | 82 | 35 | 38 | 9 | 194 | 243 | 79 |
| 14 | Atlanta Thrashers | SE | 82 | 34 | 40 | 8 | 216 | 272 | 76 |
| 15 | Tampa Bay Lightning | SE | 82 | 31 | 42 | 9 | 223 | 267 | 71 |

Divisions: AT – Atlantic, NE – Northeast, SE – Southeast

bold – qualified for playoffs, y – division winner, z – placed first in conference (and division)

== Schedule and results ==
2007–08 regular season
October: 5–5–0 (home: 3–2–0; road: 2–3–0)

| Game | Date | Visitor | Score | Home | OT | Decision | Attendance | Record | Points | Recap |
|---|---|---|---|---|---|---|---|---|---|---|
| 1 | October 5 | NY Islanders | 6 – 4 | Buffalo | | Miller | 18,690 | 0–1–0 | 0 | L |
| 2 | October 6 | Buffalo | 2 – 3 | NY Islanders | | Miller | 16,234 | 0–2–0 | 0 | L |
| 3 | October 11 | Atlanta | 0 – 6 | Buffalo | | Miller | 18,690 | 1–2–0 | 2 | W |
| 4 | October 13 | Washington | 3 – 7 | Buffalo | | Miller | 18,690 | 2–2–0 | 4 | W |
| 5 | October 15 | Toronto | 4 – 5 | Buffalo | OT | Thibault | 18,217 | 3–2–0 | 6 | W |
| 6 | October 19 | Columbus | 3 – 0 | Buffalo | | Miller | 18,690 | 3–3–0 | 6 | L |
| 7 | October 20 | Buffalo | 2 – 4 | Montreal | | Miller | 21,273 | 3–4–0 | 6 | L |
| 8 | October 24 | Buffalo | 2 – 6 | Carolina | | Miller | 16,058 | 3–5–0 | 6 | L |
| 9 | October 26 | Buffalo | 4 – 2 | Florida | | Miller | 15,842 | 4–5–0 | 8 | W |
| 10 | October 27 | Buffalo | 4 – 3 | Tampa Bay | OT | Miller | 19,804 | 5–5–0 | 10 | W |

November: 6–6–1 (home: 4–3–0; road: 2–3–1)

| Game | Date | Visitor | Score | Home | OT | Decision | Attendance | Record | Points | Recap |
|---|---|---|---|---|---|---|---|---|---|---|
| 11 | November 1 | Buffalo | 3 – 4 | Boston | OT | Miller | 13,479 | 5–5–1 | 11 | OTL |
| 12 | November 2 | Florida | 4 – 2 | Buffalo | | Thibault | 18,690 | 5–6–1 | 11 | L |
| 13 | November 5 | Buffalo | 0 – 2 | Montreal | | Miller | 21,273 | 5–7–1 | 11 | L |
| 14 | November 7 | Boston | 1 – 2 | Buffalo | OT | Miller | 18,690 | 6–7–1 | 13 | W |
| 15 | November 9 | Toronto | 3 – 0 | Buffalo | | Miller | 18,690 | 6–8–1 | 13 | L |
| 16 | November 10 | Buffalo | 1 – 2 | Boston | | Miller | 17,565 | 6–9–1 | 13 | L |
| 17 | November 15 | Buffalo | 2 – 3 | Ottawa | | Miller | 19,279 | 6–10–1 | 13 | L |
| 18 | November 16 | Montreal | 1 – 4 | Buffalo | | Miller | 18,690 | 7–10–1 | 15 | W |
| 19 | November 21 | Ottawa | 2 – 4 | Buffalo | | Miller | 18,690 | 8–10–1 | 17 | W |
| 20 | November 23 | Montreal | 2 – 4 | Buffalo | | Miller | 18,690 | 9–10–1 | 19 | W |
| 21 | November 24 | Buffalo | 3 – 0 | Montreal | | Thibault | 21,273 | 10–10–1 | 21 | W |
| 22 | November 26 | Buffalo | 3 – 1 | Washington | | Miller | 11,204 | 11–10–1 | 23 | W |
| 23 | November 28 | St. Louis | 4 – 3 | Buffalo | | Miller | 18,690 | 11–11–1 | 23 | L |

December: 8–5–1 (home: 4–2–0; road: 4–3–1)

| Game | Date | Visitor | Score | Home | OT | Decision | Attendance | Record | Points | Recap |
|---|---|---|---|---|---|---|---|---|---|---|
| 24 | December 1 | Carolina | 1 – 8 | Buffalo | | Miller | 18,690 | 12–11–1 | 25 | W |
| 25 | December 5 | Buffalo | 1 – 4 | Anaheim | | Miller | 17,174 | 12–12–1 | 25 | L |
| 26 | December 6 | Buffalo | 2 – 8 | Los Angeles | | Thibault | 15,980 | 12–13–1 | 25 | L |
| 27 | December 8 | Buffalo | 7 – 1 | San Jose | | Miller | 17,496 | 13–13–1 | 27 | W |
| 28 | December 10 | Boston | 4 – 1 | Buffalo | | Miller | 18,302 | 13–14–1 | 27 | L |
| 29 | December 12 | NY Islanders | 3 – 5 | Buffalo | | Miller | 18,690 | 14–14–1 | 29 | W |
| 30 | December 14 | Buffalo | 5 – 3 | Washington | | Miller | 17,035 | 15–14–1 | 31 | W |
| 31 | December 15 | Chicago | 1 – 3 | Buffalo | | Miller | 18,690 | 16–14–1 | 33 | W |
| 32 | December 19 | Buffalo | 2 – 1 | NY Islanders | | Miller | 10,806 | 17–14–1 | 35 | W |
| 33 | December 21 | Philadelphia | 2 – 3 | Buffalo | | Miller | 18,690 | 18–14–1 | 37 | W |
| 34 | December 22 | Buffalo | 6 – 5 | Philadelphia | SO | Miller | 19,606 | 19–14–1 | 39 | W |
| 35 | December 26 | Ottawa | 5 – 3 | Buffalo | | Miller | 18,690 | 19–15–1 | 39 | L |
| 36 | December 28 | Buffalo | 1 – 2 | New Jersey | SO | Miller | 17,625 | 19–15–2 | 40 | OTL |
| 37 | December 29 | Buffalo | 0 – 2 | Pittsburgh | | Miller | 17,132 | 19–16–2 | 40 | L |

January: 4–5–4 (home: 1–1–2; road: 3–4–2)

| Game | Date | Visitor | Score | Home | OT | Decision | Attendance | Record | Points | Recap |
|---|---|---|---|---|---|---|---|---|---|---|
| 38 | January 1 | Pittsburgh | 2 – 1 | Buffalo^{*} | SO | Miller | 71,217 | 19–16–3 | 41 | OTL |
| 39 | January 4 | Ottawa | 5 – 3 | Buffalo | | Thibault | 18,690 | 19–17–3 | 41 | L |
| 40 | January 6 | Buffalo | 2 – 5 | Atlanta | | Miller | 15,213 | 19–18–3 | 41 | L |
| 41 | January 8 | Buffalo | 1 – 2 | New Jersey | SO | Miller | 14,030 | 19–18–4 | 42 | OTL |
| 42 | January 10 | Buffalo | 2 – 3 | Ottawa | SO | Thibault | 19,843 | 19–18–5 | 43 | OTL |
| 43 | January 12 | New Jersey | 3 – 2 | Buffalo | SO | Miller | 18,690 | 19–18–6 | 44 | OTL |
| 44 | January 16 | Buffalo | 1 – 2 | NY Rangers | | Miller | 18,200 | 19–19–6 | 44 | L |
| 45 | January 18 | Atlanta | 1 – 10 | Buffalo | | Miller | 18,690 | 20–19–6 | 46 | W |
| 46 | January 19 | Buffalo | 2 – 4 | Toronto | | Miller | 19,436 | 20–20–6 | 46 | L |
| 47 | January 21 | Buffalo | 2 – 6 | Phoenix | | Thibault | 16,981 | 20–21–6 | 46 | L |
| 48 | January 24 | Buffalo | 2 – 1 | Dallas | | Miller | 18,532 | 21–21–6 | 48 | W |
| 49 | January 29 | Buffalo | 4 – 2 | Tampa Bay | | Miller | 18,920 | 22–21–6 | 50 | W |
| 50 | January 30 | Buffalo | 1 – 0 | Florida | | Miller | 14,024 | 23–21–6 | 52 | W |
Notes: *Played at Ralph Wilson Stadium in Orchard Park, New York.

February: 8–4–3 (home: 5–3–2; road: 3–1–1)

| Game | Date | Visitor | Score | Home | OT | Decision | Attendance | Record | Points | Recap |
|---|---|---|---|---|---|---|---|---|---|---|
| 51 | February 1 | Buffalo | 4 – 5 | Atlanta | SO | Thibault | 17,064 | 23–21–7 | 53 | OTL |
| 52 | February 5 | Buffalo | 4 – 2 | Boston | | Miller | 13,427 | 24–21–7 | 55 | W |
| 53 | February 6 | New Jersey | 2 – 3 | Buffalo | SO | Miller | 18,690 | 25–21–7 | 57 | W |
| 54 | February 8 | Boston | 3 – 2 | Buffalo | SO | Miller | 18,690 | 25–21–8 | 58 | OTL |
| 55 | February 10 | Florida | 3 – 5 | Buffalo | | Miller | 18,690 | 26–21–8 | 60 | W |
| 56 | February 12 | Buffalo | 5 – 1 | Ottawa | | Miller | 19,564 | 27–21–8 | 62 | W |
| 57 | February 13 | Toronto | 0 – 1 | Buffalo | | Miller | 18,690 | 28–21–8 | 64 | W |
| 58 | February 16 | Buffalo | 1 – 5 | NY Rangers | | Miller | 18,200 | 28–22–8 | 64 | L |
| 59 | February 17 | Pittsburgh | 4 – 1 | Buffalo | | Miller | 18,690 | 28–23–8 | 64 | L |
| 60 | February 20 | Tampa Bay | 3 – 4 | Buffalo | OT | Miller | 18,690 | 29–23–8 | 66 | W |
| 61 | February 21 | Buffalo | 5 – 1 | Toronto | | Miller | 19,467 | 30–23–8 | 68 | W |
| 62 | February 23 | NY Rangers | 4 – 3 | Buffalo | | Miller | 18,690 | 30–24–8 | 68 | L |
| 63 | February 25 | Philadelphia | 4 – 3 | Buffalo | SO | Miller | 18,690 | 30–24–9 | 69 | OTL |
| 64 | February 27 | Nashville | 4 – 8 | Buffalo | | Miller | 18,690 | 31–24–9 | 71 | W |
| 65 | February 29 | Montreal | 6 – 2 | Buffalo | | Miller | 18,690 | 31–25–9 | 71 | L |

March: 6–5–3 (home: 3–4–2; road: 3–1–1)

| Game | Date | Visitor | Score | Home | OT | Decision | Attendance | Record | Points | Recap |
|---|---|---|---|---|---|---|---|---|---|---|
| 66 | March 2 | Detroit | 4 – 2 | Buffalo | | Miller | 18,690 | 31–26–9 | 71 | L |
| 67 | March 4 | Buffalo | 5 – 2 | Philadelphia | | Miller | 19,516 | 32–26–9 | 73 | W |
| 68 | March 5 | Washington | 3 – 1 | Buffalo | | Miller | 18,690 | 32–27–9 | 73 | L |
| 69 | March 8 | Buffalo | 3 – 4 | Carolina | OT | Miller | 18,808 | 32–27–10 | 74 | OTL |
| 70 | March 10 | NY Rangers | 3 – 2 | Buffalo | SO | Miller | 18,690 | 32–27–11 | 75 | OTL |
| 71 | March 12 | Buffalo | 3 – 7 | Pittsburgh | | Miller | 17,132 | 32–28–11 | 75 | L |
| 72 | March 14 | Carolina | 1 – 7 | Buffalo | | Miller | 18,690 | 33–28–11 | 77 | W |
| 73 | March 15 | Buffalo | 6 – 2 | Toronto | | Miller | 19,462 | 34–28–11 | 79 | W |
| 74 | March 19 | Tampa Bay | 4 – 7 | Buffalo | | Miller | 18,690 | 35–28–11 | 81 | W |
| 75 | March 21 | Toronto | 4 – 1 | Buffalo | | Miller | 18,690 | 35–29–11 | 81 | L |
| 76 | March 25 | Ottawa | 6 – 3 | Buffalo | | Miller | 18,690 | 35–30–11 | 81 | L |
| 77 | March 27 | Buffalo | 4 – 3 | Ottawa | SO | Miller | 19,883 | 36–30–11 | 83 | W |
| 78 | March 28 | Montreal | 4 – 3 | Buffalo | OT | Miller | 18,690 | 36–30–12 | 84 | OTL |
| 79 | March 30 | Boston | 1 – 2 | Buffalo | OT | Miller | 18,690 | 37–30–12 | 86 | W |

April: 2–1–0 (home: 0–0–0; road: 2–1–0)

| Game | Date | Visitor | Score | Home | OT | Decision | Attendance | Record | Points | Recap |
|---|---|---|---|---|---|---|---|---|---|---|
| 80 | April 1 | Buffalo | 4 – 3 | Toronto | SO | Miller | 19,288 | 38–30–12 | 88 | W |
| 81 | April 3 | Buffalo | 1 – 3 | Montreal | | Miller | 21,273 | 38–31–12 | 88 | L |
| 82 | April 5 | Buffalo | 3 – 0 | Boston | | Thibault | 17,565 | 39–31–12 | 90 | W |

Legend: W Win (2 points) L Loss (0 points) OTL Overtime/shootout loss (1 point)

== Player statistics ==
=== Skaters ===
Note: GP = Games played; G = Goals; A = Assists; Pts = Points; +/- = Plus/minus; PIM = Penalty minutes

| | | Regular season |
| Player | # | GP | G | A | Pts | +/- | PIM |
|---|---|---|---|---|---|---|---|
| Derek Roy | 9 | 78 | 32 | 49 | 81 | +13 | 46 |
| Jason Pominville | 29 | 82 | 27 | 53 | 80 | +16 | 20 |
| Thomas Vanek | 26 | 82 | 36 | 28 | 64 | −5 | 64 |
| Jochen Hecht | 55 | 75 | 22 | 27 | 49 | +1 | 38 |
| Brian Campbell* | 51 | 63 | 5 | 38 | 43 | −1 | 12 |
| Ales Kotalik | 12 | 79 | 23 | 20 | 43 | −5 | 58 |
| Tim Connolly | 19 | 48 | 7 | 33 | 40 | +4 | 8 |
| Drew Stafford | 21 | 64 | 16 | 22 | 38 | +3 | 51 |
| Paul Gaustad | 28 | 82 | 10 | 26 | 36 | −4 | 85 |
| Daniel Paille | 20 | 77 | 19 | 16 | 35 | +9 | 14 |
| Jaroslav Spacek | 6 | 60 | 9 | 23 | 32 | +7 | 42 |
| Maxim Afinogenov | 61 | 56 | 10 | 18 | 28 | −16 | 42 |
| Toni Lydman | 5 | 82 | 4 | 22 | 26 | +1 | 74 |
| Henrik Tallinder | 10 | 71 | 1 | 17 | 18 | +5 | 48 |
| Adam Mair | 22 | 72 | 5 | 12 | 17 | −2 | 66 |
| Clarke MacArthur | 41 | 37 | 8 | 7 | 15 | +3 | 20 |
| Steve Bernier* | 56 | 17 | 3 | 6 | 9 | +1 | 2 |
| Nathan Paetsch | 38 | 59 | 2 | 7 | 9 | +3 | 27 |
| Andrej Sekera | 44 | 37 | 2 | 6 | 8 | +5 | 16 |
| Michael Ryan | 37 | 46 | 4 | 4 | 8 | −4 | 30 |
| Dmitri Kalinin | 45 | 46 | 1 | 7 | 8 | −7 | 32 |
| Nolan Pratt | 4 | 55 | 1 | 6 | 7 | +1 | 30 |
| Patrick Kaleta | 36 | 40 | 3 | 2 | 5 | +1 | 41 |
| Mike Weber | 34 | 16 | 0 | 3 | 3 | +12 | 14 |
| Andrew Peters | 76 | 44 | 1 | 1 | 2 | −4 | 100 |
| Ryan Miller | 30 | 76 | 0 | 1 | 1 | N/A | 6 |
| Teppo Numminen | 27 | 1 | 0 | 0 | 0 | E | 0 |
| Marc-Andre Gragnani | 17 | 2 | 0 | 0 | 0 | −2 | 4 |
| Michael Funk | 3 | 4 | 0 | 0 | 0 | −3 | 0 |
| Jocelyn Thibault | 35 | 12 | 0 | 0 | 0 | N/A | 0 |

*Stats reflect games played with Buffalo only.

- Note: Goaltenders are not assessed plus/minus ratings.

=== Goaltenders ===
Note: GP = Games played; TOI = Time on ice (minutes); W = Wins; L = Losses; OTL = Overtime losses; GA = Goals against; SO = Shutouts; SV% = Save percentage; GAA = Goals against average

| | | Regular season |
| Player | # | GP | TOI | W | L | OTL | GA | SO | SV% | GAA |
|---|---|---|---|---|---|---|---|---|---|---|
| Ryan Miller | 30 | 76 | 4474:18 | 36 | 27 | 10 | 197 | 3 | .906 | 2.64 |
| Jocelyn Thibault | 35 | 12 | 507:03 | 3 | 4 | 2 | 28 | 2 | .869 | 3.31 |

== Awards and records ==
=== Milestones ===
Regular season
| Player | Milestone | Date achieved |
| Jason Pominville | 100th NHL point | October 13, 2007 |
| Derek Roy | 200th NHL game | October 19, 2007 |
| Mike Weber | 1st NHL game | October 26, 2007 |
| Jochen Hecht | 300th NHL point | October 26, 2007 |
| Andrej Sekera | 1st NHL assist 1st NHL point | October 26, 2007 |
| Tim Connolly | 400th NHL game | October 27, 2007 |
| Andrej Sekera | 1st NHL goal | November 28, 2007 |
| Maxim Afinogenov | 500th NHL game | December 26, 2007 |
| Thomas Vanek | 200th NHL Game | December 29, 2007 |
| Drew Stafford | 1st NHL hat trick | January 18, 2008 |
| Patrick Kaleta | 1st NHL goal | February 10, 2008 |
| Ryan Miller | 100th NHL win | February 10, 2008 |
| Thomas Vanek | 1st NHL hat trick | February 12, 2008 |
| Marc-Andre Gragnani | 1st NHL game | February 23, 2008 |
| Mike Weber | 1st NHL assist 1st NHL point | March 12, 2008 |
| Thomas Vanek | 100th NHL Goal | March 21, 2008 |
| Ryan Miller | 200th NHL Game | March 25, 2008 |
| Coach | Milestone | Date achieved |
| Lindy Ruff | 800th NHL game | February 23, 2008 |

== Transactions ==
The Sabres have been involved in the following transactions during the 2007–08 season.

=== Trades ===
| June 23, 2007 | To Calgary Flames 4th-round pick in 2007 – Keith Aulie | To Buffalo Sabres 5th-round pick in 2007 – Bradley Eidsness; 5th-round pick in 2007 – Jean-Simon Allard |
| February 26, 2008 | To San Jose Sharks Brian Campbell; 7th-round pick in 2008 – Drew Daniels | To Buffalo Sabres Steve Bernier; 1st-round pick in 2008 – Tyler Ennis |

=== Free agents acquired ===
| Player | Former team | Contract terms |
| Jocelyn Thibault | Pittsburgh Penguins | 1 year, $760,000 |
| Nolan Pratt | Tampa Bay Lightning | 1 year, $550,000 |

| Player | New team |
| Daniel Briere | Philadelphia Flyers |
| Chris Drury | New York Rangers |
| Dainius Zubrus | New Jersey Devils |
| Ty Conklin | Pittsburgh Penguins |

== Draft picks ==
Buffalo's picks at the 2007 NHL entry draft in Columbus, Ohio.

| Round | # | Player | Position | Nationality | College/junior/club team (league) |
|---|---|---|---|---|---|
| 2 | 31 | T. J. Brennan | Defenseman | United States | St. John's Fog Devils (QMJHL) |
| 2 | 59 | Drew Schiestel | Defenseman | Canada | Mississauga IceDogs (OHL) |
| 3 | 89 | Corey Tropp | Forward | United States | Sioux Falls Stampede (USHL) |
| 5 | 139 | Bradley Eidsness | Goaltender | Canada | Okotoks Oilers (AJHL) |
| 5 | 147 | Jean-Simon Allard | Center | Canada | St. John's Fog Devils (QMJHL) |
| 6 | 179 | Paul Byron | Center | Canada | Gatineau Olympiques (QMJHL) |
| 7 | 187 | Nick Eno | Goaltender | United States | Green Mountain Glades (EJHL) |
| 7 | 209 | Drew MacKenzie | Defenseman | United States | Taft School (USHS-CT) |

== Farm teams ==
=== Rochester Americans ===
The Rochester Americans remain Buffalo's top affiliate in the American Hockey League in 2007–08. It is expected to be the last year of the two teams' long affiliation and the teams are expected to part ways at the end of the season.

== See also ==
- 2007–08 NHL season
