= Chris Minard =

Canadian ice hockey player

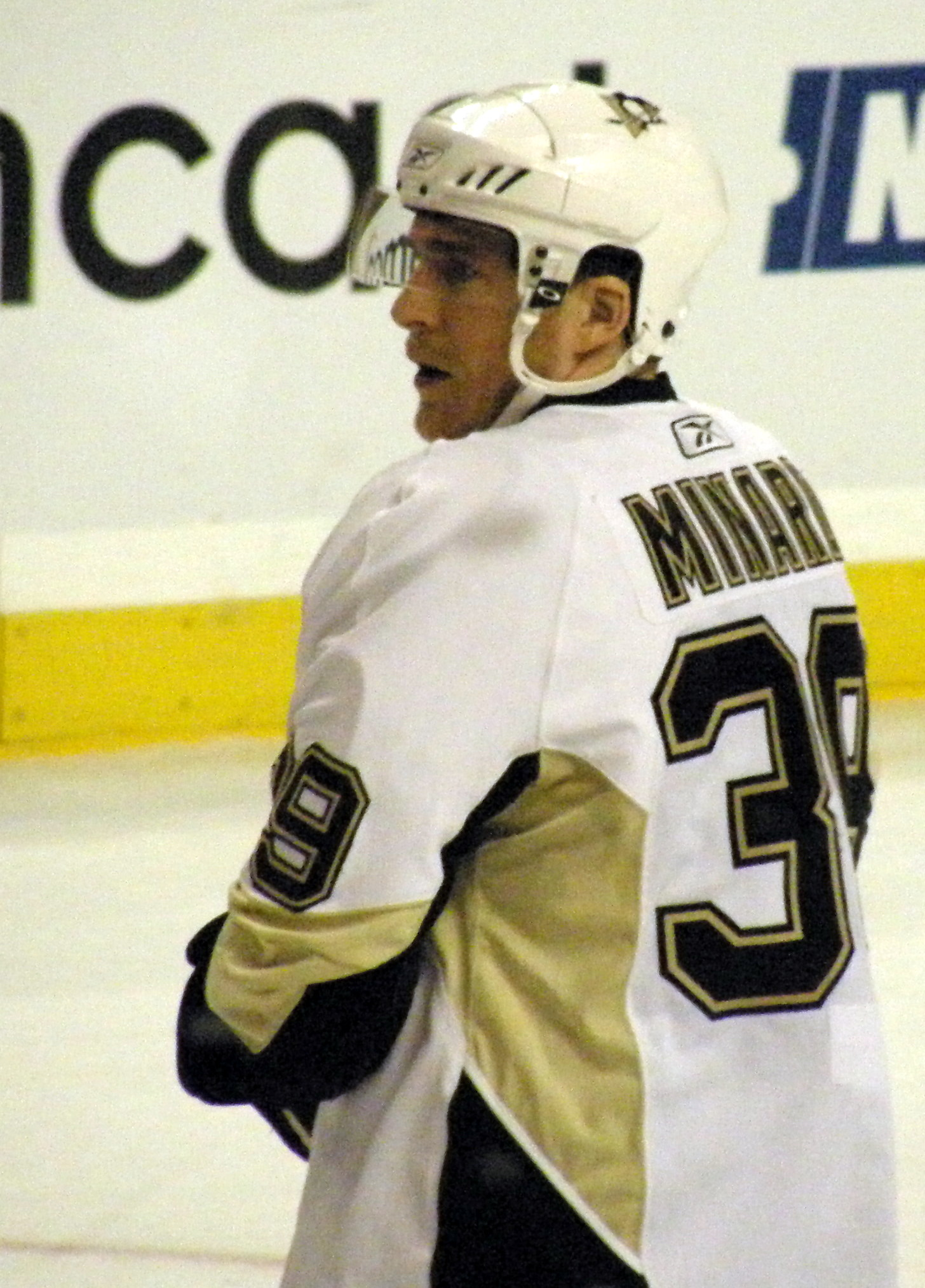
- Minard with the Pittsburgh Penguins in 2008
- Born: November 18, 1981 (age 44) Owen Sound, Ontario, Canada
- Height: 6 ft 1 in (185 cm)
- Weight: 200 lb (91 kg; 14 st 4 lb)
- Position: Centre
- Shot: Left
- Played for: Pittsburgh Penguins; Edmonton Oilers; Kölner Haie; Düsseldorfer EG
- NHL draft: Undrafted
- Playing career: 2002–2017

Christopher Minard (born November 18, 1981) is a Canadian former professional ice hockey player. He played in the National Hockey League (NHL) with the Pittsburgh Penguins and Edmonton Oilers before finishing his career in the Deutsche Eishockey Liga (DEL). Minard began his professional career in 2002 with the Pensacola Ice Pilots of the ECHL. His brother, Mike Minard, also played briefly in the NHL, as a goaltender for the Edmonton Oilers.

== Playing career ==
During the 2004–05 season he played with the Alaska Aces, and made his AHL debut, playing one game with the Milwaukee Admirals. During the NHL lockout, Minard played on a line with Scott Gomez, who had returned to his hometown of Anchorage to play for the season. During the season, Minard posted career highs in goals scored. This led to Gomez influencing New Jersey Devils management to give Minard a training camp slot, where he would earn a spot for the 2005–06 AHL season with the Albany River Rats, and the 2006–07 season with the Lowell Devils.

Minard was signed by the Penguins on July 12, 2007. He made his NHL debut on January 21, 2008 against the Washington Capitals. On February 26, Minard recorded his first NHL point, with an assist against the New York Islanders. Minard scored his first NHL goal on March 12, 2008, beating Ryan Miller of the Buffalo Sabres.

On July 13, 2009 he signed a one-year deal with the Edmonton Oilers, one month after the Pittsburgh Penguins won the Stanley Cup. Minard was included on team picture, and awarded a Stanley Cup Ring. He did not play enough games to get his name stamped on the Stanley Cup.

After three seasons in the German DEL, with Kölner Haie and failing the qualify for the playoffs in the 2014–15 season, Minard opted to leave the club and sign a two-year contract with rivals Düsseldorfer EG on March 4, 2015. At the conclusion of his second year with Düsseldorfer in the 2016–17 season, having contributed with just 9 points in 49 games, Minard opted to end his professional career after 15 seasons.

== Career statistics ==
			Regular season					Playoffs
Season	Team	League	GP	G	A	Pts	PIM	GP	G	A	Pts	PIM
1997–98	Owen Sound Platers	OHL	9	0	1	1	0	1	0	0	0	2
1998–99	Owen Sound Platers	OHL	43	6	9	15	18	—	—	—	—	—
1999–00	Owen Sound Platers	OHL	38	12	14	26	39	—	—	—	—	—
1999–00	Toronto St. Michael's Majors	OHL	28	5	14	19	6	—	—	—	—	—
2000–01	Toronto St. Michael's Majors	OHL	40	11	8	19	28	—	—	—	—	—
2000–01	Oshawa Generals	OHL	28	12	12	24	18	—	—	—	—	—
2001–02	Oshawa Generals	OHL	67	36	35	71	20	5	2	3	5	6
2002–03	Pensacola Ice Pilots	ECHL	72	15	17	32	71	4	0	0	0	6
2003–04	San Angelo Saints	CHL	64	39	36	75	51	5	1	1	2	2
2004–05	Alaska Aces	ECHL	69	49	29	78	54	15	4	4	8	12
2004–05	Milwaukee Admirals	AHL	1	0	0	0	0	—	—	—	—	—
2005–06	Alaska Aces	ECHL	33	26	16	42	38	22	14	5	19	54
2005–06	Albany River Rats	AHL	37	7	12	19	26	—	—	—	—	—
2006–07	Lowell Devils	AHL	65	32	17	49	30	—	—	—	—	—
2007–08	Wilkes-Barre/Scranton Penguins	AHL	56	25	17	42	33	23	11	6	17	10
2007–08	Pittsburgh Penguins	NHL	15	1	1	2	10	—	—	—	—	—
2008–09	Wilkes-Barre/Scranton Penguins	AHL	54	34	23	57	38	12	6	3	9	12
2008–09	Pittsburgh Penguins	NHL	20	1	2	3	4	—	—	—	—	—
2009–10	Springfield Falcons	AHL	40	22	16	38	18	—	—	—	—	—
2009–10	Edmonton Oilers	NHL	5	0	1	1	0	—	—	—	—	—
2010–11	Grand Rapids Griffins	AHL	79	18	17	35	45	—	—	—	—	—
2011–12	Grand Rapids Griffins	AHL	39	21	11	32	25	—	—	—	—	—
2012–13	Kölner Haie	DEL	52	23	15	38	32	12	3	1	4	18
2013–14	Kölner Haie	DEL	52	18	15	33	93	17	8	2	10	8
2014–15	Kölner Haie	DEL	45	12	11	23	55	—	—	—	—	—
2015–16	Düsseldorfer EG	DEL	52	12	4	16	54	5	0	2	2	0
2016–17	Düsseldorfer EG	DEL	49	4	5	9	32	—	—	—	—	—
NHL totals			40	2	4	6	14	—	—	—	—	—
