= 2007–08 Pittsburgh Penguins season =

NHL team season

2007–08 Pittsburgh Penguins
- Eastern Conference champions
- Atlantic Division champions
- Division: 1st Atlantic
- Conference: 2nd Eastern
- 2007–08 record: 47–27–8
- Home record: 26–10–5
- Road record: 21–17–3
- Goals for: 247
- Goals against: 216

Team information
- General manager: Ray Shero
- Coach: Michel Therrien
- Captain: Sidney Crosby
- Alternate captains: Sergei Gonchar; Ryan Malone; Gary Roberts
- Arena: Mellon Arena
- Average attendance: 17,089 (100.7%)

Team leaders
- Goals: Evgeni Malkin (47)
- Assists: Evgeni Malkin (59)
- Points: Evgeni Malkin (106)
- Penalty minutes: Georges Laraque (139)
- Plus/minus: Sidney Crosby (+18)
- Wins: Marc-Andre Fleury (19)
- Goals against average: Marc-Andre Fleury (2.33)

The 2007–08 Pittsburgh Penguins season was the franchise's 41st season in the National Hockey League (NHL). Their regular season began on October 5, 2007, against the Carolina Hurricanes and concluded on April 6, 2008, against the rival Philadelphia Flyers. The Penguins looked to improve upon their progress in the 2006–07 season after being eliminated in the first round of the Eastern Conference playoffs by the Ottawa Senators. During the season, the Penguins wore gold patches with "250" on them, honoring the city of Pittsburgh's 250th anniversary in 2008.

Evgeni Malkin scored 106 points in the regular season, helping to offset the gap left while Sidney Crosby was injured. Goaltender Ty Conklin replaced Marc-Andre Fleury, who was also injured, to win 18 games. The team surpassed their record for total attendance, selling out all 41 home games for the first time in franchise history. The Penguins also participated in the AMP Energy NHL Winter Classic, which set the NHL single-game attendance record.

During the regular season, the Penguins finished second in the Eastern Conference, behind the Montreal Canadiens. With a 12–2 record in the Eastern Conference playoffs, the team eliminated the Senators, the New York Rangers and the Flyers, on their way to the 2008 Stanley Cup Finals, the franchise's first in 16 years. The team was defeated in the Stanley Cup Finals by the Detroit Red Wings in six games, the only time the Penguins were defeated in the Stanley Cup Finals.

== Regular season ==
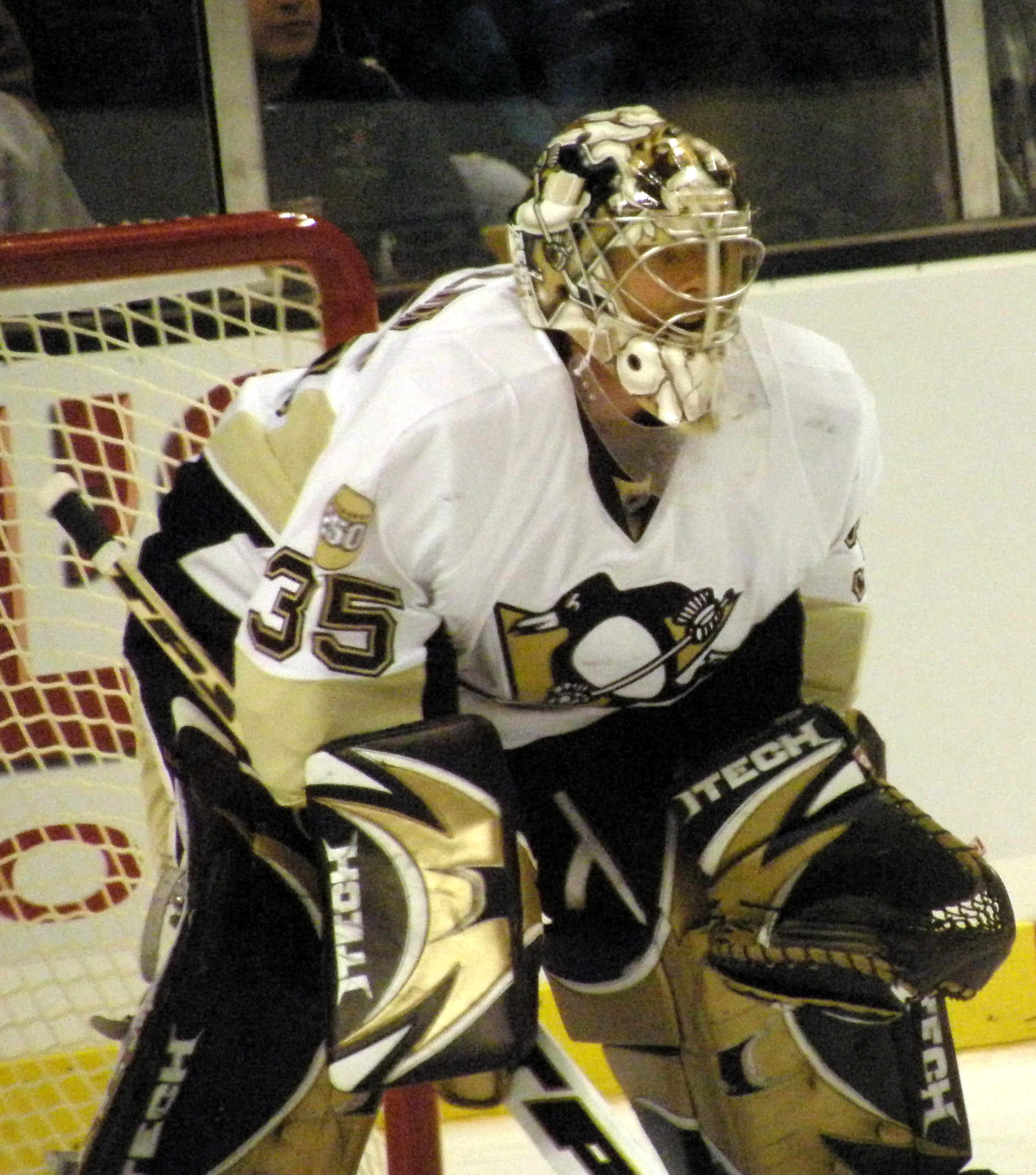
Ty Conklin went 17–6–5 in Marc-Andre Fleury's absence.

The Penguins' offseason activities began in May 2007, with the team naming Sidney Crosby its captain. At just 19 years old, Crosby became the youngest captain in NHL history. Crosby was named the first Penguins captain since the retirement of Mario Lemieux in January 2006; Crosby, Mark Recchi, Sergei Gonchar and John LeClair served as alternate captains after Lemieux's retirement. Veteran Gary Roberts was named as an alternate captain for the new season, joining Recchi and Gonchar. The Penguins also extended head coach Michel Therrien's contract through the 2008–09 season.

On September 17, the NHL announced that on January 1, 2008, the Penguins would travel to Orchard Park, New York to play the Buffalo Sabres outdoors at Ralph Wilson Stadium in the AMP Energy NHL Winter Classic. The event marked the first time a regular-season contest was played outdoors in the United States.

The Penguins began the regular season on October 5 visiting the Carolina Hurricanes. The team played their home-opener against the Anaheim Ducks on October 6 in front of a standing-room-only crowd of 17,132, the first of 41 sellouts over the course of the season. Through November 21, the Penguins acquired a record of 8–11–2, going 2–6–1 against Atlantic Division teams in November including a four-game losing streak, their longest of the season. Following a Thanksgiving Day shootout victory against the Ottawa Senators, the Penguins won seven of the next eight games, including the franchise's first sweep of a Western Canada road trip. Beginning on December 23, the Penguins compiled a point streak of ten games, including eight consecutive victories, the longest winning streak for the Penguins in nearly ten years. In January and February, the team was 16–6–5, climbing the conference standings with the help of goaltender Ty Conklin and center Evgeni Malkin. During the final full month, in March, the team was 10–4–1, and 7–0–0 at home in Mellon Arena. The team concluded the regular season with a home-and-home series against the Philadelphia Flyers, with each team winning a game.

The Penguins suffered from several injuries during the season. Many of the injuries were long-term. By the end of the season, the team had missed a combined total of over 280 man games due to injury. Goalie Marc-Andre Fleury sustained a high-ankle sprain against the Calgary Flames on December 6. Following the injury, Fleury was ruled out for six to eight weeks. The Penguins recalled Ty Conklin from the American Hockey League to serve as a back-up to Dany Sabourin on an emergency basis. Conklin started for the first time on December 20, winning the game 5–4 in a shootout. After winning his first nine starts and supplanting Sabourin as the starting goaltender, Conklin lost his first game, a shootout, on January 12 against the Atlanta Thrashers. Before Fleury's eventual return as a starter on March 2,

Crosby also sustained a high ankle sprain on January 18 against the Tampa Bay Lightning and was ruled out for six to eight weeks. Crosby returned on March 4, playing in three games before being removed from the lineup again on March 12. After missing the next seven games, Crosby returned against the New York Islanders on March 27, after missing 28 games. The injury forced Crosby to miss the All-Star Game, where he was the leading vote-getter for the second year in a row. Teammate Evgeni Malkin was selected to play for the Eastern Conference team in place of the injured Crosby.

Following the release of Recchi in early December and injuries to Crosby and Roberts (Recchi's replacement), Sergei Gonchar remained the Penguins' only active captain. The team assigned two new alternate captains, with Ryan Malone and Darryl Sydor serving during the injuries.

After the injury to Crosby on January 18, a makeshift line composed of Malkin, Malone and Petr Sykora, dubbed the "Steel City Line", helped sustain the Penguins' standing. Malkin scored 46 points during Crosby's absence.

=== Winter Classic ===
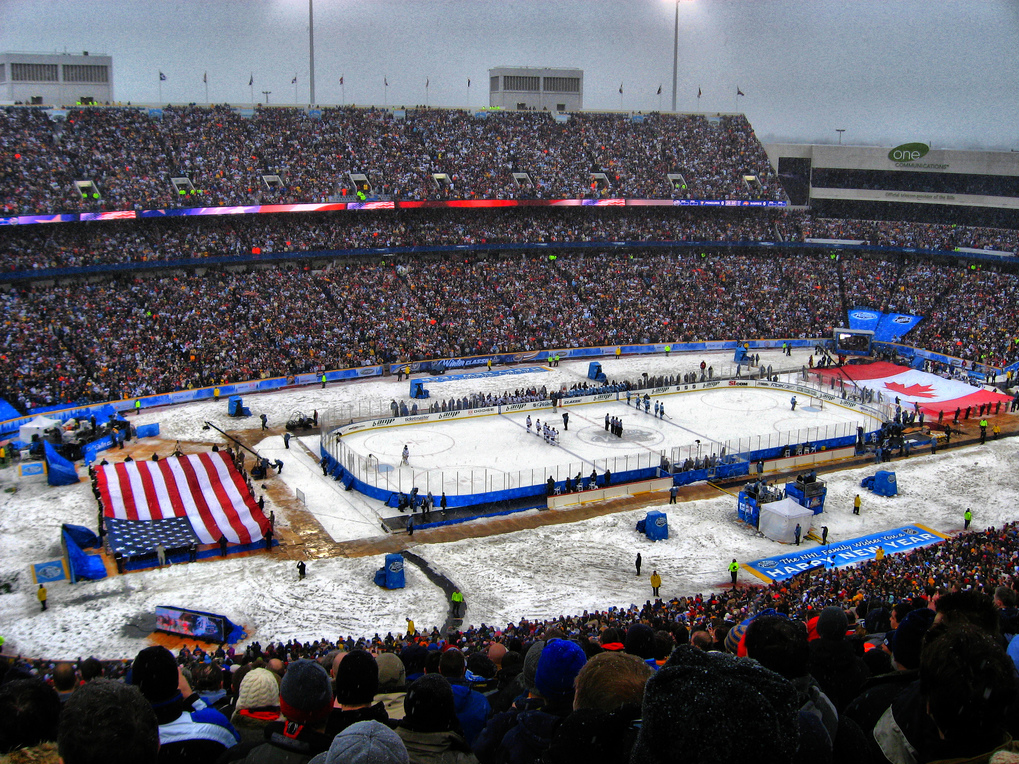
View from inside the stadium during the opening ceremony of the Winter Classic

With an attendance of 71,417, the Winter Classic, held on January 1, 2008, at Ralph Wilson Stadium, surpassed the NHL single-game attendance record set on November 22, 2003, when the Edmonton Oilers hosted the Montreal Canadiens at Commonwealth Stadium in Edmonton before 57,167 fans in the 2003 Heritage Classic. The New Year's Day game between the Penguins and the Buffalo Sabres was broadcast nationwide on NBC in the United States, CBC in Canada, all Westwood One affiliates in the US and Canada and on XM satellite radio. The Penguins defeated the Sabres, 2–1, with a shootout goal from Crosby.

=== Fan support ===
On December 21, 2007, at a game against the New York Islanders, the Penguins tied a franchise record with 30 straight regular-season sellouts, dating to the second half of the 2006–07 season. The record was surpassed at the next home game against the Boston Bruins on December 23, with the 31st consecutive sellout of the regular season. On March 12, against the Buffalo Sabres, with a standing-room-only crowd of 17,132, the Penguins set a franchise record after selling out all 35 games to date, surpassing the record set during the 1988–89 and 1989–90 seasons when the Penguins sold out 34 of 40 home games. For the first time in the franchise's 41-year history, the team sold out all 41 home games, concluding with their Atlantic Division-clinching victory over the Philadelphia Flyers on April 2. At 17,089, the average attendance for a home game was greater than Mellon Arena's seating capacity of 16,940, causing the team's season attendance to exceed 100% capacity. The 67 consecutive sellouts attracted 888,653 total fans, a record for home attendance for the franchise.

The March 27 game against the Islanders received a television rating of 10.7, the second-highest rating all-time for a Penguins game. The only game to draw a higher rating, at 15.9, was the comeback of Mario Lemieux against the Toronto Maple Leafs on December 27, 2000. The flagship station for Penguins television broadcasts, FSN Pittsburgh, had the highest-rated NHL broadcasts of any of the Fox Sports Net regional affiliates for the second year in a row.

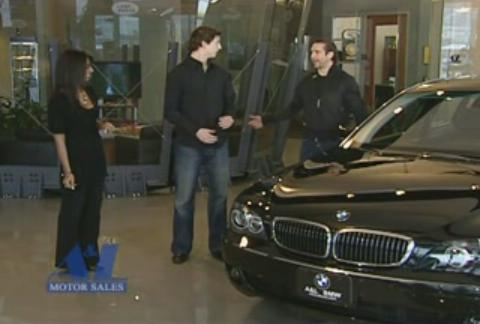
Colby Armstrong and Maxime Talbot appear in a commercial for a Pittsburgh-based luxury car dealership.

Strong support from fans continued into the playoffs, as the Penguins sold out their first two home games in 11 minutes. The team erected a 12 by 16 foot LED screen on the lawn directly outside Mellon Arena, allowing fans to watch all playoff games outside of the stadium, free of charge. A rally scheduled by Allegheny County executive Dan Onorato and Mayor Luke Ravenstahl took place in front of the Allegheny County Courthouse prior to Game 2 of the team's first-round series on April 11. The Penguins' third game of the playoffs attracted the third-highest regional viewing audience all-time for a Penguins game. The 4,200 tickets offered for the team's first two home games of Round Two sold out within 10 minutes. As the playoffs advanced into the later rounds, the team had growing support from players and coaches of other teams in Pittsburgh, including the Steelers and Pirates, and many of the players attended games. Steelers head coach Mike Tomlin watched Game 6 of the Finals outside Mellon Arena, along with 3,000 other fans. Prior to the Stanley Cup Finals, Mayor Ravenstahl led a rally in the city's Market Square, which featured chanting by the several hundred people in attendance; cooked octopus was also served by Wholey's Fish Market, in reference to the Detroit tradition of throwing octopuses onto the ice. The team also opened up Mellon Arena for fans to watch away games on the JumboTron during the Stanley Cup Finals; over 13,500 people attended Game 1. Fans who watched the three games played in Detroit raised over $85,000 for the Mario Lemieux Foundation for cancer research. The Penguins also ranked first in the league in merchandise sales.

In an annual survey of over 80,000 fans conducted by ESPN The Magazine titled "Ultimate Standings: Fan Satisfaction Rankings," the Penguins ranked as the best National Hockey League team in terms of fan relations. The team also ranked third in that category, out of all 122 major sports franchises of the National Football League, National Basketball Association, Major League Baseball and the NHL. In the overall standings, the Penguins ranked seventh in the NHL, and 24th of the 122 teams in all four leagues. During the 2006–07 season, the team ranked 11th in the NHL, and 35th overall.

=== Plans for the future ===
During the All-Star break, the league announced that the Penguins would open the 2008–09 season with games on October 4 and 5 against the Ottawa Senators at the Globe Arena in Stockholm, Sweden. Also, the New York Rangers would open against the Tampa Bay Lightning in Prague, Czech Republic. Later, on March 12, the league and the NHL Players Association announced that the Penguins would play an exhibition game against Jokerit of the SM-liiga, the top professional league in Finland, on October 2, at Hartwall Arena in Helsinki.

Progress was made towards the team's new arena on March 22, when the former St. Francis Hospital, across the street from Mellon Arena, was imploded. Following debris removal and site preparation, groundbreaking for construction began in the summer.

=== Season results ===
The Penguins clinched their second consecutive playoff berth on March 25 in a 2–0 victory against the New Jersey Devils and earned the second-seed in the Eastern Conference. Two years removed from their last-place Eastern Conference finish in 2006, the Penguins clinched the Atlantic Division for the first time ever, when they defeated the Philadelphia Flyers, 4–2. The division championship was the first for the Penguins since winning the Northeast Division in 1998. It was the best finish by the team since finishing second in the 1997–98 season. The 102 points the Penguins gained during the season was the team's fifth 100-point season. The Penguins raised banners for their top finish in the Atlantic Division and subsequent Eastern Conference playoff championship prior to the first Mellon Arena home game of the 2008–09 season.

=== Game log ===
2007–08 regular season
October: 6–4–1 (home: 3–3–1; road: 3–2–0), 13 points

#	Oct	Time (ET)	Visitor	Score	Home	Location	Record	Points	Recap
1	5	7:00 PM	Pittsburgh Penguins	1–4	Carolina Hurricanes	PNC Arena (17,816)	0–1–0	0	L
2	6	7:30 PM	Anaheim Ducks	4–5	Pittsburgh Penguins	Civic Arena (17,132)	1–1–0	2	W
3	10	7:30 PM	Montreal Canadiens	3–2	Pittsburgh Penguins	Civic Arena (17,006)	1–2–0	2	L
4	13	7:00 PM	Pittsburgh Penguins	6–4	Toronto Maple Leafs	Air Canada Centre (19,479)	2–2–0	4	W
5	17	7:30 PM	New Jersey Devils	5–4	Pittsburgh Penguins	Civic Arena (16,990)	2–3–0	4	L
6	19	7:30 PM	Carolina Hurricanes	3–4 SO	Pittsburgh Penguins	Civic Arena (17,132)	3–3–0	6	W
7	20	7:00 PM	Pittsburgh Penguins	2–1	Washington Capitals	Verizon Center (18,277)	4–3–0	8	W
8	23	7:00 PM	New York Rangers	0–1	Pittsburgh Penguins	Civic Arena (17,012)	5–3–0	10	W
9	25	7:30 PM	Toronto Maple Leafs	5–2	Pittsburgh Penguins	Civic Arena (17,051)	5–4–0	10	L
10	27	7:00 PM	Montreal Canadiens	4–3 SO	Pittsburgh Penguins	Civic Arena (17,085)	5–4–1	11	OTL
11	30	7:00 PM	Pittsburgh Penguins	4–2	Minnesota Wild	Xcel Energy Center (18,568)	6–4–1	13	W

November: 5–7–1 (home: 3–3–1; road: 2–4–0), 11 points

#	Nov	Time (ET)	Visitor	Score	Home	Location	Record	Points	Recap
12	1	9:00 PM	Pittsburgh Penguins	2–3	Colorado Avalanche	Pepsi Center (18,007)	6–5–1	13	L
13	3	7:00 PM	Pittsburgh Penguins	2–3	New York Islanders	Nassau Coliseum (16,234)	6–6–1	13	L
14	5	7:00 PM	Pittsburgh Penguins	5–0	New Jersey Devils	Prudential Center (14,032)	7–6–1	15	W
15	7	7:00 PM	Philadelphia Flyers	3–1	Pittsburgh Penguins	Civic Arena (17,132)	7–7–1	15	L
16	8	7:00 PM	Pittsburgh Penguins	2–4	New York Rangers	Madison Square Garden (IV) (18,200)	7–8–1	15	L
17	10	7:00 PM	Pittsburgh Penguins	2–5	Philadelphia Flyers	Wells Fargo Center (19,859)	7–9–1	15	L
18	12	7:30 PM	New Jersey Devils	3–2	Pittsburgh Penguins	Civic Arena (17,096)	7–10–1	15	L
19	15	7:30 PM	New York Islanders	2–3	Pittsburgh Penguins	Civic Arena (16,972)	8–10–1	17	W
20	17	7:30 PM	New York Rangers	4–3 OT	Pittsburgh Penguins	Civic Arena (17,125)	8–10–2	18	OTL
21	21	7:30 PM	New Jersey Devils	2–1	Pittsburgh Penguins	Civic Arena (17,132)	8–11–2	18	L
22	22	7:30 PM	Pittsburgh Penguins	6–5 SO	Ottawa Senators	Canadian Tire Centre (20,061)	9–11–2	20	W
23	24	7:30 PM	Atlanta Thrashers	0–5	Pittsburgh Penguins	Civic Arena (17,132)	10–11–2	22	W
24	30	7:30 PM	Dallas Stars	1–4	Pittsburgh Penguins	Civic Arena (17,132)	11–11–2	24	W

December: 9–5–0 (home: 4–2–0; road: 5–3–0), 18 points

#	Dec	Time (ET)	Visitor	Score	Home	Location	Record	Points	Recap
25	1	7:00 PM	Pittsburgh Penguins	2–4	Toronto Maple Leafs	Air Canada Centre (19,534)	11–12–2	24	L
26	3	7:30 PM	Phoenix Coyotes	1–3	Pittsburgh Penguins	Civic Arena (16,979)	12–12–2	26	W
27	5	9:30 PM	Pittsburgh Penguins	4–2	Edmonton Oilers	Rexall Place (16,839)	13–12–2	28	W
28	6	9:00 PM	Pittsburgh Penguins	3–2 SO	Calgary Flames	Scotiabank Saddledome (19,289)	14–12–2	30	W
29	8	10:00 PM	Pittsburgh Penguins	2–1 SO	Vancouver Canucks	Rogers Arena (18,630)	15–12–2	32	W
30	11	7:00 PM	Pittsburgh Penguins	2–8	Philadelphia Flyers	Wells Fargo Center (19,409)	15–13–2	32	L
31	13	7:30 PM	Ottawa Senators	4–1	Pittsburgh Penguins	Civic Arena (16,982)	15–14–2	32	L
32	15	7:00 PM	Pittsburgh Penguins	3–2	New York Islanders	Nassau Coliseum (15,269)	16–14–2	34	W
33	18	7:00 PM	Pittsburgh Penguins	0–4	New York Rangers	Madison Square Garden (IV) (18,200)	16–15–2	34	L
34	20	7:00 PM	Pittsburgh Penguins	5–4 SO	Boston Bruins	TD Garden (15,304)	17–15–2	36	W
35	21	7:30 PM	New York Islanders	4–2	Pittsburgh Penguins	Civic Arena (17,008)	17–16–2	36	L
36	23	3:00 PM	Boston Bruins	2–4	Pittsburgh Penguins	Civic Arena (17,060)	18–16–2	38	W
37	27	7:30 PM	Washington Capitals	3–4 OT	Pittsburgh Penguins	Civic Arena (17,132)	19–16–2	40	W
38	29	7:30 PM	Buffalo Sabres	0–2	Pittsburgh Penguins	Civic Arena (17,132)	20–16–2	42	W

January: 8–3–2 (home: 3–1–1; road: 5–2–1), 18 points

#	Jan	Time (ET)	Visitor	Score	Home	Location	Record	Points	Recap
39	1	1:00 PM	Pittsburgh Penguins	2–1 SO	Buffalo Sabres	Ralph Wilson Stadium (71,217)	21–16–2	44	W
40	3	7:30 PM	Toronto Maple Leafs	2–6	Pittsburgh Penguins	Civic Arena (17,074)	22–16–2	46	W
41	5	3:00 PM	Florida Panthers	0–3	Pittsburgh Penguins	Civic Arena (17,090)	23–16–2	48	W
42	8	7:30 PM	Pittsburgh Penguins	3–1	Florida Panthers	BB&T Center (17,086)	24–16–2	50	W
43	10	7:30 PM	Pittsburgh Penguins	4–1	Tampa Bay Lightning	Amalie Arena (20,426)	25–16–2	52	W
44	12	7:00 PM	Pittsburgh Penguins	2–3 SO	Atlanta Thrashers	Philips Arena (18,545)	25–16–3	53	OTL
45	14	7:00 PM	New York Rangers	1–4	Pittsburgh Penguins	Civic Arena (17,000)	26–16–3	55	W
46	18	7:30 PM	Tampa Bay Lightning	3–0	Pittsburgh Penguins	Civic Arena (17,132)	26–17–3	55	L
47	19	7:00 PM	Pittsburgh Penguins	2–0	Montreal Canadiens	Bell Centre (21,273)	27–17–3	57	W
48	21	7:30 PM	Washington Capitals	6–5 SO	Pittsburgh Penguins	Civic Arena (17,050)	27–17–4	58	OTL
49	24	7:00 PM	Pittsburgh Penguins	3–4	Philadelphia Flyers	Wells Fargo Center (19,807)	27–18–4	58	L
50	29	7:00 PM	Pittsburgh Penguins	4–2	New Jersey Devils	Prudential Center (13,595)	28–18–4	60	W
51	30	7:00 PM	Pittsburgh Penguins	1–4	Atlanta Thrashers	Philips Arena (14,070)	28–19–4	60	L

February: 8–3–3 (home: 5–1–2; road: 3–2–1), 19 points

#	Feb	Time (ET)	Visitor	Score	Home	Location	Record	Points	Recap
52	2	7:30 PM	Carolina Hurricanes	1–4	Pittsburgh Penguins	Civic Arena (17,058)	29–19–4	62	W
53	4	7:00 PM	Pittsburgh Penguins	3–4 OT	New Jersey Devils	Prudential Center (13,012)	29–19–5	63	OTL
54	7	7:30 PM	New York Islanders	3–4	Pittsburgh Penguins	Civic Arena (17,075)	30–19–5	65	W
55	9	1:00 PM	Los Angeles Kings	2–4	Pittsburgh Penguins	Civic Arena (17,034)	31–19–5	67	W
56	10	1:00 PM	Philadelphia Flyers	3–4	Pittsburgh Penguins	Civic Arena (17,132)	32–19–5	69	W
57	13	7:30 PM	Boston Bruins	2–1	Pittsburgh Penguins	Civic Arena (16,982)	32–20–5	69	L
58	14	7:00 PM	Pittsburgh Penguins	2–4	Carolina Hurricanes	PNC Arena (14,922)	32–21–5	69	L
59	17	6:00 PM	Pittsburgh Penguins	4–1	Buffalo Sabres	First Niagara Center (18,690)	33–21–5	71	W
60	19	7:30 PM	Florida Panthers	2–3	Pittsburgh Penguins	Civic Arena (17,075)	34–21–5	73	W
61	21	7:30 PM	Pittsburgh Penguins	5–4	Montreal Canadiens	Bell Centre (21,273)	35–21–5	75	W
62	23	3:00 PM	Ottawa Senators	4–3 OT	Pittsburgh Penguins	Civic Arena (17,132)	35–21–6	76	OTL
63	24	3:00 PM	San Jose Sharks	2–1 SO	Pittsburgh Penguins	Civic Arena (17,132)	35–21–7	77	OTL
64	26	7:00 PM	Pittsburgh Penguins	4–2	New York Islanders	Nassau Coliseum (11,258)	36–21–7	79	W
65	28	7:00 PM	Pittsburgh Penguins	1–5	Boston Bruins	TD Garden (17,565)	36–22–7	79	L

March: 10–4–1 (home: 7–0–0; road: 3–4–1), 21 points

#	Mar	Time (ET)	Visitor	Score	Home	Location	Record	Points	Recap
66	1	3:00 PM	Pittsburgh Penguins	4–5	Ottawa Senators	Canadian Tire Centre (20,153)	36–23–7	79	L
67	2	3:00 PM	Atlanta Thrashers	2–3 SO	Pittsburgh Penguins	Civic Arena (17,132)	37–23–7	81	W
68	4	7:30 PM	Pittsburgh Penguins	2–0	Tampa Bay Lightning	Amalie Arena (19,206)	38–23–7	83	W
69	6	7:30 PM	Pittsburgh Penguins	2–5	Florida Panthers	BB&T Center (17,012)	38–24–7	83	L
70	9	12:30 PM	Pittsburgh Penguins	4–2	Washington Capitals	Verizon Center (18,277)	39–24–7	85	W
71	12	7:30 PM	Buffalo Sabres	3–7	Pittsburgh Penguins	Civic Arena (17,132)	40–24–7	87	W
72	16	12:00 PM	Philadelphia Flyers	1–7	Pittsburgh Penguins	Civic Arena (17,132)	41–24–7	89	W
73	18	7:00 PM	Pittsburgh Penguins	2–5	New York Rangers	Madison Square Garden (IV) (18,200)	41–25–7	89	L
74	20	7:30 PM	Tampa Bay Lightning	2–4	Pittsburgh Penguins	Civic Arena (17,044)	42–25–7	91	W
75	22	7:30 PM	New Jersey Devils	1–7	Pittsburgh Penguins	Civic Arena (17,132)	43–25–7	93	W
76	24	7:00 PM	Pittsburgh Penguins	1–4	New York Islanders	Nassau Coliseum (16,234)	43–26–7	93	L
77	25	7:00 PM	Pittsburgh Penguins	2–0	New Jersey Devils	Prudential Center (16,292)	44–26–7	95	W
78	27	7:30 PM	New York Islanders	1–3	Pittsburgh Penguins	Civic Arena (17,025)	45–26–7	97	W
79	30	12:30 PM	New York Rangers	1–3	Pittsburgh Penguins	Civic Arena (17,020)	46–26–7	99	W
80	31	7:00 PM	Pittsburgh Penguins	1–2 OT	New York Rangers	Madison Square Garden (IV) (18,200)	46–26–8	100	OTL

April: 1–1–0 (home: 1–0–0; road: 0–1–0), 2 points

#	Apr	Time (ET)	Visitor	Score	Home	Location	Record	Points	Recap
81	2	7:30 PM	Philadelphia Flyers	2–4	Pittsburgh Penguins	Civic Arena (17,132)	47–26–8	102	W
82	6	3:00 PM	Pittsburgh Penguins	0–2	Philadelphia Flyers	Wells Fargo Center (19,767)	47–27–8	102	L

**Legend**: W Win (2 points) L Loss (0 points) OTL Overtime/shootout loss (1 point)

=== Divisional standings ===
Atlantic Division
		GP	W	L	OTL	GF	GA	Pts
**1**	**Pittsburgh Penguins**	**82**	**47**	**27**	**8**	**247**	**216**	**102**
**2**	**New Jersey Devils**	**82**	**46**	**29**	**7**	**206**	**197**	**99**
**3**	**New York Rangers**	**82**	**42**	**27**	**13**	**213**	**199**	**97**
**4**	**Philadelphia Flyers**	**82**	**42**	**29**	**11**	**248**	**233**	**95**
5	New York Islanders	82	35	38	9	194	243	79

=== Conference standings ===
Eastern Conference
R		Div	GP	W	L	OTL	GF	GA	Pts
**1**	**z – Montreal Canadiens**	**NE**	**82**	**47**	**25**	**10**	**262**	**222**	104
**2**	**y – Pittsburgh Penguins**	**AT**	**82**	**47**	**27**	**8**	**247**	**216**	102
**3**	**y – Washington Capitals**	**SE**	**82**	**43**	**31**	**8**	**242**	**231**	94
**4**	**New Jersey Devils**	**AT**	**82**	**46**	**29**	**7**	**206**	**197**	99
**5**	**New York Rangers**	**AT**	**82**	**42**	**27**	**13**	**213**	**199**	97
**6**	**Philadelphia Flyers**	**AT**	**82**	**42**	**29**	**11**	**248**	**233**	95
**7**	**Ottawa Senators**	**NE**	**82**	**43**	**31**	**8**	**261**	**247**	94
**8**	**Boston Bruins**	**NE**	**82**	**41**	**29**	**12**	**212**	**222**	94
8.5
9	Carolina Hurricanes	SE	82	43	33	6	252	249	92
10	Buffalo Sabres	NE	82	39	31	12	255	242	90
11	Florida Panthers	SE	82	38	35	9	216	226	85
12	Toronto Maple Leafs	NE	82	36	35	11	231	260	83
13	New York Islanders	AT	82	35	38	9	194	243	79
14	Atlanta Thrashers	SE	82	34	40	8	216	272	76
15	Tampa Bay Lightning	SE	82	31	42	9	223	267	71

Divisions: AT – Atlantic, NE – Northeast, SE – Southeast

bold – qualified for playoffs, y – division winner, z – placed first in conference (and division)

=== Detailed records ===
Final

**Eastern Conference**
Atlantic	GP	W	L	OT	SHOTS	GF	GA	PP	PK	FO W–L
New Jersey Devils	8	4	3	1	220–210	28	17	11–34	7–37	202–225
New York Islanders	8	5	3	0	224–268	22	21	9–38	5–35	190–270
New York Rangers	8	3	3	2	180–260	16	21	5–35	9–42	205–213
Philadelphia Flyers	8	3	5	0	214–229	23	28	9–40	11–46	222–253
**Pittsburgh Penguins**										
Division Total	32	15	14	3	838–967	89	87	34–147	32–160	819–961

Northeast	GP	W	L	OT	SHOTS	GF	GA	PP	PK	FO W–L
Boston Bruins	4	2	2	0	103–135	11	13	2–21	3–21	111–133
Buffalo Sabres	4	4	0	0	111–132	15	5	4–16	1–14	112–119
Montreal Canadiens	4	2	1	1	107–115	12	11	5–16	4–14	101–121
Ottawa Senators	4	1	2	1	116–120	14	18	3–22	6–13	99–138
Toronto Maple Leafs	4	2	2	0	133–130	16	15	4–23	3–20	125–114
Division Total	20	11	7	2	570–632	68	62	18–98	17–82	548–625

Southeast	GP	W	L	OT	SHOTS	GF	GA	PP	PK	FO W–L
Atlanta Thrashers	4	2	1	1	129–126	11	9	2–13	4–17	103–121
Carolina Hurricanes	4	2	2	0	114–139	11	12	5–23	5–20	117–135
Florida Panthers	4	3	1	0	125–134	11	8	3–22	0–8	99–131
Tampa Bay Lightning	4	3	1	0	102–126	10	6	1–11	2–14	88–120
Washington Capitals	4	3	0	1	90–124	15	12	5–20	4–18	106–132
Division Total	20	13	5	2	560–649	58	47	16–89	15–77	513–639
Conference Total	72	39	26	7	1968–2248	215	196	68–334	64–319	1880–2225

**Western Conference**
Northwest	GP	W	L	OT	SHOTS	GF	GA	PP	PK	FO W–L
Calgary Flames	1	1	0	0	35–28	3	2	1–5	1–3	33–32
Colorado Avalanche	1	0	1	0	28–33	2	3	1–6	1–6	27–29
Edmonton Oilers	1	1	0	0	31–19	4	2	1–2	0–1	28–29
Minnesota Wild	1	1	0	0	27–30	4	2	1–1	0–2	38–23
Vancouver Canucks	1	1	0	0	33–36	2	1	0–5	0–5	23–34
Division Total	5	4	1	0	154–146	15	10	4–19	2–17	149–147

Pacific	GP	W	L	OT	SHOTS	GF	GA	PP	PK	FO W–L
Anaheim Ducks	1	1	0	0	29–23	5	4	1–5	1–5	32–37
Dallas Stars	1	1	0	0	28–23	4	1	0–2	0–3	21–25
Los Angeles Kings	1	1	0	0	36–28	4	2	2–6	0–5	22–37
Phoenix Coyotes	1	1	0	0	33–18	3	1	1–8	1–3	34–29
San Jose Sharks	1	0	0	1	21–37	1	2	1–4	0–5	23–26
Division Total	5	4	0	1	147–129	17	10	5–25	2–21	132–154
Conference Total	10	8	1	1	301–275	32	20	9–44	4–38	281–301
NHL Total	82	47	27	8	2269–2523	247	216	77–378	68–357	2161–2526

== Playoffs ==
=== Eastern Conference quarterfinal ===
The Penguins opened the playoffs against the seventh-seeded Ottawa Senators, in the Eastern Conference quarterfinal, a rematch of the previous season's first round matchup that saw Ottawa win in five games. In the opening game on April 9 in Pittsburgh's Mellon Arena, the Penguins defeated the Senators 4–0. In the game, Evgeni Malkin scored his first career playoff goal, Marc-Andre Fleury recorded his first career playoff shutout, Petr Sykora added a goal and Gary Roberts scored twice. In game two, the Penguins took a lead of 3–0 following a goal from Sergei Gonchar and two from Sykora. The Senators came back to tie the game in the third period, before Ryan Malone scored twice to give the Penguins their second victory in the series. The Pens scored four unanswered goals from Maxime Talbot, Sidney Crosby, Jordan Staal and Marian Hossa to defeat the Senators 4–1 in game three, the first game in Ottawa's Scotiabank Place. Two days later, the Penguins managed to eliminate the Senators in four games, the only team to do so in the first round. The team got goals from Malkin, Crosby and the series-winner from Jarkko Ruutu in the second period to defeat the Senators, 3–1. The Penguins were the first team to advance from the opening round. The series win was the team's first since the 2001 playoffs, and the first sweep of a playoff series in 16 years.

=== Eastern Conference semifinals ===
The Penguins began the Eastern Conference semifinal against their Atlantic Division rival New York Rangers on April 25. The team overcame a 3–0 deficit to defeat the Rangers 5–4 in game one. Hossa tied the game 4:40 into the third period, and Sykora took the lead twenty seconds later. After Scott Gomez tied the game at four, Malkin scored the game-winning goal, deflecting a shot by Crosby with 1:41 left. In game two, Staal scored a powerplay goal to take a 1–0 lead. In the last minute, Adam Hall shot the puck down ice, and it drifted into the empty net. Marc-Andre Fleury saved all 26 shots, and the Penguins took a 2–0 lead in the series. The Penguins entered game three at Madison Square Gardens after going 0–3–1 in the building during the regular season. They led 3–1 after the first period, before Jaromir Jagr tied the game. Malkin scored on the powerplay with 2:07 left in the second period to take the lead, and Malone added a goal in the third to give the Pens a 5–3 win, and a 3–0 series lead. The Penguins lost their first game of the post-season in game four against the Rangers. Jagr scored in the second period, Brandon Dubinsky in the third and Jagr scored again on an empty net goal in the last minute to force game five. In game five, the Penguins took a 2–0 lead in the second period after goals from Malkin and Hossa before the Rangers tied in the third. The game entered overtime, the first of the playoffs for the Penguins, where Hossa scored his second goal of the game 7:10 in. With the goal, the Penguins advanced to the Eastern Conference finals.

=== Eastern Conference final ===
The Eastern Conference final began between the Penguins and the Philadelphia Flyers on May 9. Malkin scored with 7 seconds left in the first period to take a 3–2 lead, and extended the advantage with a shorthanded goal in the second period, giving the Penguins a 1–0 advantage in the series after game one. In game two, Talbot scored to take the lead in the third period, and Staal added an empty-net goal to give the Penguins a 4–2 win and a 2–0 series lead. The win was the Penguins' seventh consecutive home playoff win, a franchise record, improving on a six-game streak in the 1992 playoffs. The Penguins also became only the fifth team to start the playoffs with a 10–1 record, and the first since the Detroit Red Wings in 1995. Game three saw the series move across the state to Philadelphia; the Penguins struck quickly with goals from Ryan Whitney and Hossa within the first eight minutes. Hossa added his second goal on an empty net to seal the victory. With the win, the Penguins become the first team since the 1983 Edmonton Oilers to start the playoffs 11–1. The Penguins failed to close out the Eastern Conference finals with a sweep of the Flyers in game four, losing 4–2. The Flyers jumped out to a 3–0 lead in the first period. The Penguins fought back getting two goals from Jordan Staal in the third period, but Joffrey Lupul's second goal on an empty net sealed the win for the Flyers. The series returned to Pittsburgh for game five, where the Penguins won their eighth consecutive home game by a final score of 6–0, the Prince of Wales Trophy, and a trip to the Stanley Cup Final.

=== Stanley Cup Finals ===
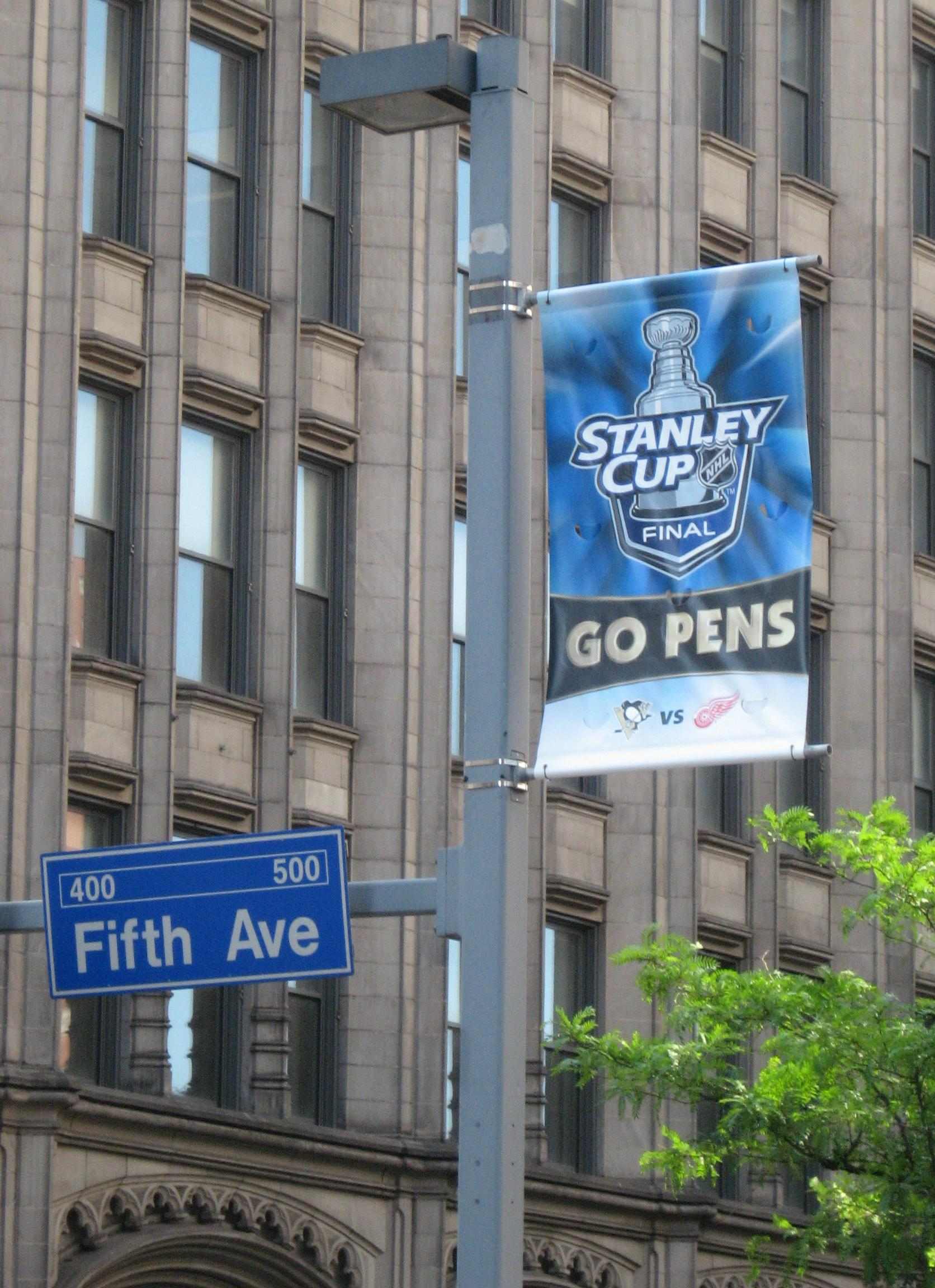
A street sign celebrates the Penguins' 2008 Stanley Cup Finals appearance on Fifth Avenue in downtown Pittsburgh.

The Penguins faced the champion of Western Conference and Presidents' Trophy-winning Detroit Red Wings for the Stanley Cup. The best-of-seven series began in Detroit on May 24, the first series the Penguins opened on the road. It was the third Stanley Cup Final appearance for the Penguins franchise, the first since consecutive victories during the 1991 and 1992 Stanley Cup Final. The Red Wings made their 23rd appearance, and first since 2002. The series ended on June 4 with the Red Wings winning in six games.

In game one at Detroit's Joe Louis Arena, the Red Wings opened scoring in the second period with a goal from Mikael Samuelsson before finishing with three goals in the third period from Samuelsson, Dan Cleary and Henrik Zetterberg, shutting out the Penguins 4–0. In preparation for Game 2, Head Coach Michel Therrien revised Pittsburgh's lines; the changes included starting Gary Roberts, who did not play in Game 1.

In game two, the Penguins were shut-out for a second time. Detroit's Brad Stuart and Tomas Holmstrom scored in the first period and Valtteri Filppula added a third goal in the third period. Pittsburgh struggled, failing to direct a shot on goal for the first 12 minutes of the game. Pittsburgh shuffled their lineup again prior to game three, replacing defenseman Kris Letang with Darryl Sydor.

Game three saw the Penguins score their first goal of the Final when Crosby netted a wrist shot 17:25 into the opening period. Crosby added his second goal of the game early in the second period. In the third, Adam Hall added the game-winning goal in the final period with assists from Maxime Talbot and Roberts. The Penguins held off a late charge by the Red Wings to win their first game of the Stanley Cup Final by a score of 3–2.

Entering game four, Sykora said the game was a must-win for the Penguins: "For us, basically, [game four] is a do-or-die game." Despite an early goal from Marian Hossa, the Penguins were unable to hold off the Red Wings, who got goals from Nicklas Lidstrom and Jiri Hudler. The Penguins' inability to capitalize on a 5-on-3 man advantage in the 3rd period, which lasted for 1:26, sealed the third victory of the series for the Red Wings.

In game five of the series, Pittsburgh faced elimination in Detroit, where they had not yet won in the series. Down 3–2 with 35 seconds remaining in regulation, Talbot scored for the Penguins, who had removed goaltender Marc-Andre Fleury to gain an extra skater. The goal tied the game at three, forcing it into sudden-death overtime. In the third overtime period, Sykora scored at the 109:57 mark of the game to give the Penguins the victory and force game six. Sykora's goal was assisted by Malkin, who had struggled in the series, and Gonchar, who was returning for his first shift in 50 minutes due to an injury. In the fifth-longest Stanley Cup game in history, goaltender Fleury stopped 55 shots, with 24 in overtime. Ryan Malone played in game six, despite being hit in the face with the puck in game five. Dave Molinari of the Pittsburgh Post-Gazette wrote that the team "seemed almost in awe of the way Malone reacted to a significant facial injury the way most people would a paper cut."

In game six, Pittsburgh got goals from Malkin, his first in the Final, and Hossa. Entering the final minute and trailing by one, Pittsburgh pulled Fleury for the second time that game, hoping to score with circumstances similar to Hossa's earlier goal. A tipped shot which passed in between Chris Osgood and the goal line as time expired did not enter the net, giving Detroit the victory. Pittsburgh's final defeat of the season was by a score of 3–2.

=== Playoff log ===
2008 Stanley Cup playoffs
Eastern Conference Quarterfinals vs No. 7 Ottawa: 4–0 (home: 2–0; road: 2–0)

#	Date	Visitor	Score	Home	OT	PIT goals	OTT goals	Decision	Attendance	Series	Recap
1	April 9	Ottawa	0–4	Pittsburgh		Roberts (2), Sykora, Malkin		Fleury	17,132	1–0	W
2	April 11	Ottawa	3–5	Pittsburgh		Gonchar, Sykora (2), Malone (2)	Donovan, Stillman, Bass	Fleury	17,132	2–0	W
3	April 14	Pittsburgh	4–1	Ottawa		Talbot, Crosby, Staal, Hossa	Foligno	Fleury	19,961	3–0	W
4	April 16	Pittsburgh	3–1	Ottawa		Malkin, Ruutu, Crosby	Stillman	Fleury	19,954	4–0	W

Eastern Conference Semifinals vs No. 5 NY Rangers: 4–1 (home: 3–0; road: 1–1)

#	Date	Visitor	Score	Home	OT	PIT goals	NYR goals	Decision	Attendance	Series	Recap
1	April 25	NY Rangers	4–5	Pittsburgh		Ruutu, Dupuis, Hossa, Sykora, Malkin	Straka, Avery, Drury, Gomez	Fleury	17,132	1–0	W
2	April 27	NY Rangers	0–2	Pittsburgh		Staal, Hall		Fleury	17,132	2–0	W
3	April 29	Pittsburgh	5–3	NY Rangers		Hossa, Laraque, Malkin (2), Malone	Straka, Callahan, Jagr	Fleury	18,200	3–0	W
4	May 1	Pittsburgh	0–3	NY Rangers			Jagr (2), Dubinsky	Fleury	18,200	3–1	L
5	May 4	NY Rangers	2–3	Pittsburgh	1	Hossa (2), Malkin	Korpikoski, Dawes	Fleury	17,132	4–1	W

Eastern Conference Finals vs No. 6 Philadelphia Flyers: 4–1 (home: 3–0; road: 1–1)

#	Date	Visitor	Score	Home	OT	PIT goals	PHI goals	Decision	Attendance	Series	Recap
1	May 9	Philadelphia	2–4	Pittsburgh		Sykora, Crosby, Malkin (2)	Richards (2)	Fleury	17,132	1–0	W
2	May 11	Philadelphia	2–4	Pittsburgh		Crosby, Hossa, Talbot, Staal	Carter, Richards	Fleury	17,132	2–0	W
3	May 13	Pittsburgh	4–1	Philadelphia		Whitney, Hossa (2), Malone	Umberger	Fleury	19,965	3–0	W
4	May 15	Pittsburgh	2–4	Philadelphia		Staal (2)	Lupul (2), Briere, Carter	Fleury	19,965	3–1	L
5	May 18	Philadelphia	0–6	Pittsburgh		Malone (2), Malkin, Hossa, Staal, Dupuis		Fleury	17,132	4–1	W

Stanley Cup Finals vs No. 1 Detroit Red Wings: 2–4 (home: 1–2; road: 1–2)

#	Date	Visitor	Score	Home	OT	PIT goals	DET goals	Decision	Attendance	Series	Recap
1	May 24	Pittsburgh	0–4	Detroit			Samuelsson (2), Cleary, Zetterberg	Fleury	20,066	0–1	L
2	May 26	Pittsburgh	0–3	Detroit			Stuart, Holmstrom, Filppula	Fleury	20,066	0–2	L
3	May 28	Detroit	2–3	Pittsburgh		Crosby (2), Hall	Franzen, Samuelsson	Fleury	17,132	1–2	W
4	May 31	Detroit	2–1	Pittsburgh		Hossa	Lidstrom, Hudler	Fleury	17,132	1–3	L
5	June 2	Pittsburgh	4–3	Detroit	3	Hossa, Hall, Talbot, Sykora	Helm, Datsyuk, Rafalsiki	Fleury	20,066	2–3	W
6	June 4	Detroit	3–2	Pittsburgh		Malkin, Hossa	Rafalski, Filppula, Zetterberg	Fleury	17,132	2–4	L

Legend: W Win L Loss

Player in italics scored winning goal.

== Player statistics ==
Skaters

Regular season
Player	GP	G	A	Pts	+/−	PIM
Evgeni Malkin	82	47	59	106	16	78
Sidney Crosby	53	24	48	72	18	39
Sergei Gonchar	78	12	53	65	13	66
Petr Sykora	81	28	35	63	1	41
Ryan Malone	77	27	24	51	14	103
Ryan Whitney	76	12	28	40	-2	45
Jordan Staal	82	12	16	28	-5	55
Max Talbot	63	12	14	26	8	53
Colby Armstrong^{‡}	54	9	15	24	6	50
Erik Christensen^{‡}	49	9	11	20	-3	28
Tyler Kennedy	55	10	9	19	2	35
Kris Letang	63	6	11	17	-1	23
Jarkko Ruutu	71	6	10	16	3	138
Gary Roberts	38	3	12	15	-3	40
Georges Laraque	71	4	9	13	0	141
Darryl Sydor	74	1	12	13	1	26
Jeff Taffe	45	5	7	12	2	8
Pascal Dupuis^{†}	16	2	10	12	4	8
Brooks Orpik	78	1	10	11	11	57
Marian Hossa^{†}	12	3	7	10	0	6
Mark Recchi^{‡}	19	2	6	8	-2	12
Adam Hall	46	2	4	6	-2	24
Rob Scuderi	71	0	5	5	3	26
Hal Gill^{†}	18	1	3	4	6	16
Mark Eaton	36	0	3	3	6	4
Chris Minard	15	1	1	2	-1	10
Alex Goligoski	3	0	2	2	2	2
Connor James	13	1	0	1	-2	2
Ryan Stone	6	0	1	1	-1	5
Alain Nasreddine	6	0	0	0	-4	4
Kris Beech	5	0	0	0	-1	2
Nathan Smith	13	0	0	0	0	2
Tim Brent	1	0	0	0	-1	0
Jonathan Filewich	5	0	0	0	-2	0
Total		240	425	665	—	1,149

Playoffs
Player	GP	G	A	Pts	+/−	PIM
Sidney Crosby	20	6	21	27	7	12
Marian Hossa	20	12	14	26	8	12
Evgeni Malkin	20	10	12	22	3	24
Ryan Malone	20	6	10	16	4	25
Sergei Gonchar	20	1	13	14	0	8
Petr Sykora	20	6	3	9	2	16
Max Talbot	17	3	6	9	4	36
Jordan Staal	20	6	1	7	-4	14
Pascal Dupuis	20	2	5	7	5	18
Ryan Whitney	20	1	5	6	8	25
Adam Hall	17	3	1	4	-1	8
Gary Roberts	11	2	2	4	-4	32
Tyler Kennedy	20	0	4	4	0	13
Jarkko Ruutu	20	2	1	3	-1	26
Georges Laraque	15	1	2	3	-1	4
Rob Scuderi	20	0	3	3	5	2
Brooks Orpik	20	0	2	2	-3	18
Kris Letang	16	0	2	2	5	12
Hal Gill	20	0	1	1	2	12
Darryl Sydor	4	0	0	0	1	2
Total		61	108	169	—	319

Goaltenders

Regular season
Player	GP	GS	TOI	W	L	OT	GA	GAA	SA	SV%	SO	G	A	PIM
Marc-Andre Fleury	35	33	1857:26	19	10	2	72	2.33	909	0.921	4	0	1	0
Ty Conklin	33	30	1865:33	18	8	5	78	2.51	1013	0.923	2	0	1	4
Dany Sabourin	24	19	1241:31	10	9	1	57	2.75	596	0.904	2	0	0	2
Total		82	4964:30	47	27	8	207	2.50	2518	0.918	8	0	2	6

Playoffs
Player	GP	GS	TOI	W	L	OT	GA	GAA	SA	SV%	SO	G	A	PIM
Marc-Andre Fleury	20	20	1251:10	14	6	--	41	1.97	610	0.933	3	0	0	2
Total		20	1251:10	14	6	0	41	1.97	610	0.933	3	0	0	2

^{†}Denotes player spent time with another team before joining the Penguins. Stats reflect time with the Penguins only.
^{‡}Denotes player was traded mid-season. Stats reflect time with the Penguins only.

== Awards and records ==
Regular season milestones
Player	Milestone	Reached
Darryl Sydor	1,100th game	October 10, 2007
Gary Roberts	900th point	December 21, 2007
Petr Sykora	600th point	February 4, 2008
Sergei Gonchar	600th point	February 21, 2008

Chris Minard made his NHL debut this season and scored his first goal this season. Evgeni Malkin recorded his first hat trick on January 3.

In addition, Marc-Andre Fleury recorded his first playoff shutout.

=== Awards ===
Evgeni Malkin was added to the All-Star Game on January 22 as a replacement following an injury to Sidney Crosby. In the game, Malkin recorded two assists. On April 29, the NHL announced that Malkin, along with Alexander Ovechkin and Jarome Iginla, was named as a finalist for the Hart Memorial Trophy, awarded to the player most valuable to his team. With 106 points, Malkin was the Penguins' leader in scoring. He finished second in the NHL only to Ovechkin. At one point in the season, Malkin recorded a 15-game point streak, the longest by a Russian player in the NHL. In June, he was announced as the NHL's top center and honored on the First All-Star Team alongside Ovechkin and Iginla, defensemen Nicklas Lidstrom and Dion Phaneuf and goaltender Evgeni Nabokov.

The Penguins benefited from the success of several players who were called up from the team's American Hockey League (AHL) affiliate, the Wilkes-Barre/Scranton Penguins. Forward Tyler Kennedy was first recalled on October 27. Defenseman Kris Letang was recalled on November 13 and immediately contributed to the Penguins shootout, scoring on all of his first five attempts, including during the Winter Classic on January 1. Of his five shots, three won the game for the Penguins. Kennedy and Letang were selected to compete in the YoungStars competition for rookies during the All-Star break.

Player	Award
Sidney Crosby	2007 Lou Marsh Award; 2007 Lionel Conacher Award; All-Star starting forward
Sergei Gonchar	All-Star defenceman
Tyler Kennedy; Kris Letang	NHL YoungStars
Evgeni Malkin	All-Star forward First Team All-Star; Hart Memorial Trophy finalist

On April 2, following the final home game against the Philadelphia Flyers, the team announced its award winners for the season. Awards were given by the Pittsburgh chapter of the Professional Hockey Writers Association, the Penguins Booster Club, as well as voted amongst the team.

Player	Award	Notes
Ryan Whitney	Baz Bastien Memorial Award	Awarded by the Writers Association for cooperation throughout the season.
Ty Conklin	Bill Masterton Memorial Trophy nominee	Nominated by the Writers Association for league-wide recognition.
Evgeni Malkin	A. T. Caggiano Memorial Booster Club Cup	Awarded to the player with the most "three stars" recognitions.
Georges Laraque	Edward J. DeBartolo Award	Awarded for time and effort towards community and charity projects.
Kris Letang	Rookie of the Year Award	
Ryan Malone	Player's Player Award	Voted by the team for leadership and teamwork.
Evgeni Malkin	Most Valuable Player	

== Transactions ==
=== Free agents ===
The free agency period began on July 1. The Penguins saw forward Michel Ouellet and goaltender Jocelyn Thibault leave as free agents to the Tampa Bay Lightning and Buffalo Sabres, respectively. To fill openings in the Penguins roster, the team signed goaltender Dany Sabourin, defenseman Darryl Sydor and forwards Petr Sykora and Adam Hall. The organization also signed forwards Nathan Smith, Chris Minard and Jeff Taffe, as well as goaltender Ty Conklin.

Player	Former team	Contract terms
Dany Sabourin	Vancouver Canucks	2 years, $1.025 million
Darryl Sydor	Dallas Stars	2 years, $5 million
Petr Sykora	Edmonton Oilers	2 years, $5 million
Nathan Smith	Vancouver Canucks	1 year, $500,000
Jeff Taffe	Phoenix Coyotes	2 years, $1 million
Ty Conklin	Buffalo Sabres	1 year, $500,000
Adam Hall	Minnesota Wild	1 year, $500,000

Player	New team
Michel Ouellet	Tampa Bay Lightning
Matt Carkner	Ottawa Senators
Wade Brookbank	Carolina Hurricanes
Nolan Schaefer	Minnesota Wild
Jocelyn Thibault	Buffalo Sabres

=== Trades ===
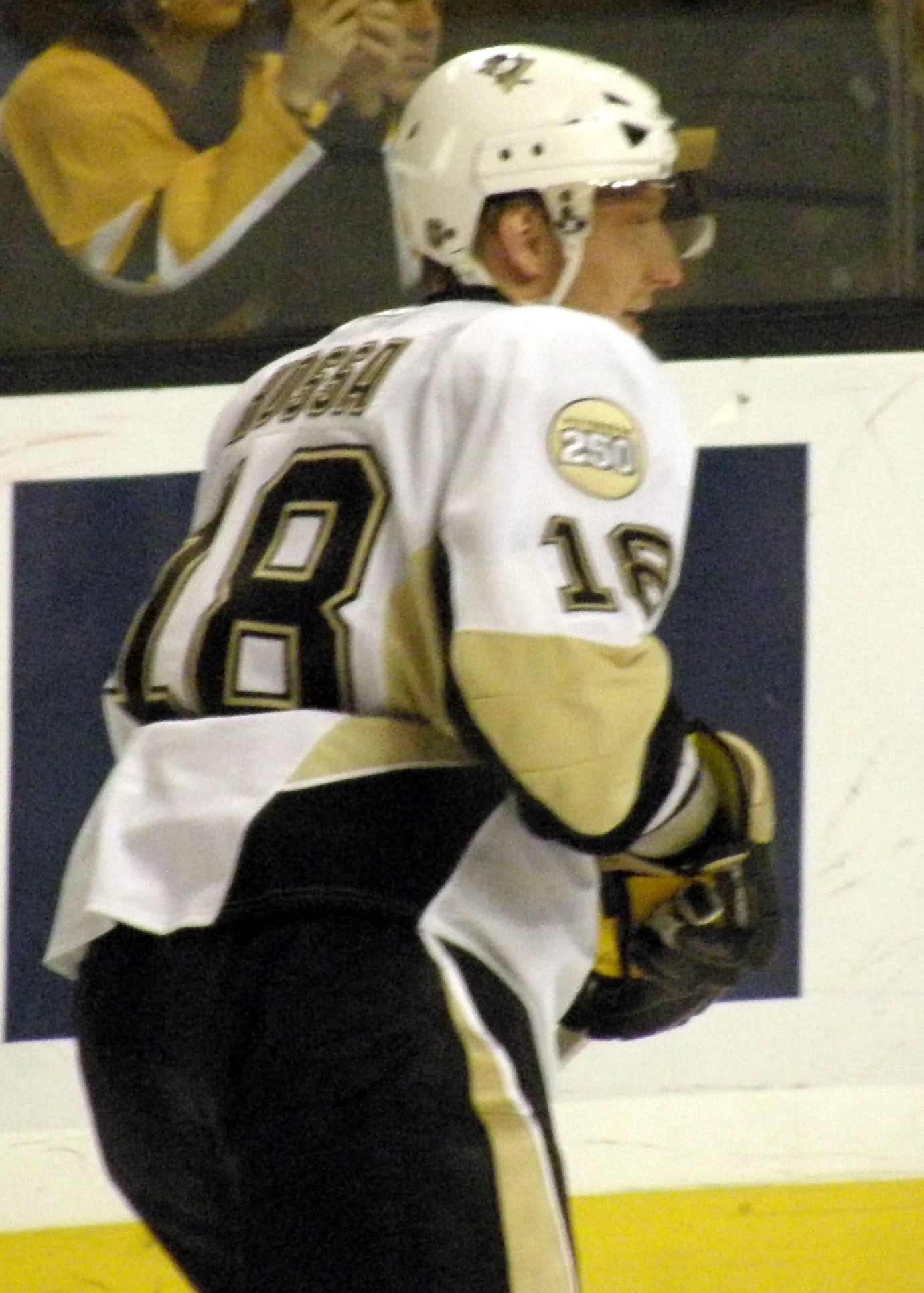
Marian Hossa was acquired by the Penguins minutes before the trade deadline.

On December 5, following talk of the team's future with Mark Recchi, the team placed the veteran right wing on waivers. After clearing without being claimed, Recchi was assigned to the Wilkes-Barre/Scranton Penguins of the AHL the next day. The following day, before playing a game with Wilkes-Barre/Scranton, Recchi was placed on re-entry waivers, where he could again be claimed by another team. On Saturday, December 8, Recchi was claimed by the Atlanta Thrashers, with whom he joined the following Tuesday. The Penguins and the Thrashers would split the remaining cost of his US$1.75 million contract.

On February 26, just minutes before the trade deadline, the Penguins made a deal with the Atlanta Thrashers to acquire right wings Marian Hossa and Pascal Dupuis in exchange for winger Colby Armstrong, center Erik Christensen, prospect Angelo Esposito and a first-round pick in the 2008 NHL entry draft. In another trade, the Pens brought in the 6-foot-7 defenseman Hal Gill from the Toronto Maple Leafs in exchange for one second- and one fifth-round pick in the 2008 and 2009 NHL entry draft, respectively.

January 31, 2008	To Carolina Hurricanes Joe Jensen	To Pittsburgh Penguins David Gove
February 26, 2008	To Toronto Maple Leafs 2008 2nd round pick 2009 5th round pick	To Pittsburgh Penguins Hal Gill
February 26, 2008	To Atlanta Thrashers Colby Armstrong; Erik Christensen; Angelo Esposito; 2008 1st round pick (Daultan Leveille)	To Pittsburgh Penguins Pascal Dupuis; Marian Hossa

== Draft picks ==
The 2007 NHL entry draft took place on June 22 and 23 at Nationwide Arena in Columbus, Ohio. With the 20th overall pick, the Penguins selected Angelo Esposito of the Quebec Remparts in the first round. The Penguins selected eight players (five forwards and three defensemen) in six of the seven rounds. All of the players remained with their junior league teams in Canada.

Round	#	Player	Pos	Nationality	College/Junior/Club team (League)
1	20	Angelo Esposito	Center	Canada	Quebec Remparts (QMJHL)
2	51	Keven Veilleux	Center	Canada	Victoriaville Tigres (QMJHL)
3	78^{[a]}	Robert Bortuzzo	Defenceman	Canada	Kitchener Rangers (OHL)
3	80^{[b]}	Casey Pierro-Zabotel	Center	Canada	Merritt Centennials (BCHL)
4	111	Luca Caputi	Left wing	Canada	Mississauga IceDogs (OHL)
4	118^{[c]}	Alex Grant	Defenceman	Canada	Saint John Sea Dogs (QMJHL)
5	141	Jake Muzzin	Defenceman	Canada	Sault Ste. Marie Greyhounds (OHL)
6	171	Dustin Jeffrey	Center	Canada	Sault Ste. Marie Greyhounds (OHL)

Draft notes

- ^{a} The Atlanta Thrashers' third-round pick (from the New York Rangers) went to the Pittsburgh Penguins as a result of a February 27, 2007 trade that sent Chris Thorburn to the Thrashers in exchange for this pick.
- ^{b} The Minnesota Wild's third-round pick went to the Pittsburgh Penguins as a result of a February 27, 2007 trade that sent Dominic Moore to the Wild in exchange for this pick.
- The Pittsburgh Penguins' third-round pick went to the Nashville Predators as the result of a July 19, 2006 trade that sent Libor Pivko and the rights to Dominic Moore to the Penguins in exchange for this pick.
- ^{c} The Detroit Red Wings' fourth-round pick went to the Pittsburgh Penguins as a result of a March 9, 2006 trade that sent Cory Cross to the Red Wings in exchange for this pick.
- The Pittsburgh Penguins' seventh-round pick went to the San Jose Sharks as the result of a February 27, 2007 trade that sent Nolan Schaefer to the Penguins in exchange for this pick.

== Farm teams ==
The Wilkes-Barre/Scranton Penguins finished first in the AHL East Division during the 2007–08 season. In the Calder Cup Playoffs, the "Baby Penguins" advanced through the Eastern Conference bracket with a record of 12–5. In the Calder Cup Final, they lost to the Chicago Wolves (ATL), four games to two.

== See also ==
- 2007–08 NHL season
