= 2007–08 Toronto Maple Leafs season =

NHL hockey team season

2007–08 Toronto Maple Leafs
- Division: 5th Northeast
- Conference: 12th Eastern
- 2007–08 record: 36–35–11
- Home record: 18–17–6
- Road record: 18–18–5
- Goals for: 231
- Goals against: 260

Team information
- General manager: John Ferguson Jr. (To Jan. 22); Cliff Fletcher (interim)
- Coach: Paul Maurice
- Captain: Mats Sundin
- Alternate captains: Tomas Kaberle; Bryan McCabe
- Arena: Air Canada Centre
- Average attendance: 19,434 (103.3%)

Team leaders
- Goals: Mats Sundin (32)
- Assists: Mats Sundin (46)
- Points: Mats Sundin (78)
- Penalty minutes: Pavel Kubina (116)
- Plus/minus: Mats Sundin (+17)
- Wins: Vesa Toskala (33)
- Goals against average: Vesa Toskala (2.74)

The 2007–08 Toronto Maple Leafs season began October 4, 2007. It is the 91st season of the franchise, 81st season as the Maple Leafs.

In an effort to return to the playoffs in 2007–08, the Leafs made two significant moves during the off-season. The first was to acquire goaltender Vesa Toskala (along with Mark Bell) from the San Jose Sharks in exchange for three draft picks. Toronto also signed free agent Jason Blake to a five-year, $20 million contract. Blake reached the 40-goal mark for the first time in 2006–07.

With the Leafs struggling in the Northeast Division, the future of John Ferguson Jr.'s tenure as general manager was widely debated after club president Richard Peddie admitted that hiring Ferguson was "a mistake". According to TSN, the Leafs asked former Toronto general manager Cliff Fletcher to serve as interim general manager early in January. On January 22, it was announced that Ferguson's time with the club had ended, as the board of directors at Maple Leaf Sports & Entertainment voted to make a change. Fletcher was named interim general manager of the team. The team missed the playoffs for the third year in a row for the first time since the 1925–26 to 1927–28 seasons.

Defenceman Tomas Kaberle was selected to represent the Maple Leafs and the Eastern Conference at the 2008 All-Star Game in Atlanta, Georgia. He hit all four targets in four shots to become the winner of the accuracy competition.

== Regular season ==
On October 8, 2007, newly acquired winger Jason Blake announced that he had chronic myelogenous leukemia, a treatable form of cancer. He continued playing during treatment.

In mid-November 2007, Jiri Tlusty was caught in a scandal when nude photos of him appeared on the Internet. Tlusty apologized for this incident and admitted that he made a mistake.

On March 27, 2008, the Toronto Maple Leafs were eliminated from postseason contention for the third straight season following a 4–2 loss to the Boston Bruins.

The Maple Leafs struggled on the penalty kill during the regular season, allowing an NHL-high 77 power-play goals.

=== Divisional standings ===
Northeast Division
		GP	W	L	OTL	GF	GA	Pts
**1**	**Montreal Canadiens**	**82**	**47**	**25**	**10**	**262**	**222**	**104**
**2**	**Ottawa Senators**	**82**	**43**	**31**	**8**	**261**	**247**	**94**
**3**	**Boston Bruins**	**82**	**41**	**29**	**12**	**212**	**222**	**94**
4	Buffalo Sabres	82	39	31	12	255	242	90
5	Toronto Maple Leafs	82	36	35	11	231	260	83

=== Conference standings ===
Eastern Conference
R		Div	GP	W	L	OTL	GF	GA	Pts
**1**	**z – Montreal Canadiens**	**NE**	**82**	**47**	**25**	**10**	**262**	**222**	104
**2**	**y – Pittsburgh Penguins**	**AT**	**82**	**47**	**27**	**8**	**247**	**216**	102
**3**	**y – Washington Capitals**	**SE**	**82**	**43**	**31**	**8**	**242**	**231**	94
**4**	**New Jersey Devils**	**AT**	**82**	**46**	**29**	**7**	**206**	**197**	99
**5**	**New York Rangers**	**AT**	**82**	**42**	**27**	**13**	**213**	**199**	97
**6**	**Philadelphia Flyers**	**AT**	**82**	**42**	**29**	**11**	**248**	**233**	95
**7**	**Ottawa Senators**	**NE**	**82**	**43**	**31**	**8**	**261**	**247**	94
**8**	**Boston Bruins**	**NE**	**82**	**41**	**29**	**12**	**212**	**222**	94
8.5
9	Carolina Hurricanes	SE	82	43	33	6	252	249	92
10	Buffalo Sabres	NE	82	39	31	12	255	242	90
11	Florida Panthers	SE	82	38	35	9	216	226	85
12	Toronto Maple Leafs	NE	82	36	35	11	231	260	83
13	New York Islanders	AT	82	35	38	9	194	243	79
14	Atlanta Thrashers	SE	82	34	40	8	216	272	76
15	Tampa Bay Lightning	SE	82	31	42	9	223	267	71

Divisions: AT – Atlantic, NE – Northeast, SE – Southeast

bold – qualified for playoffs, y – division winner, z – placed first in conference (and division)

== Schedule and results ==
2007–08 regular season
October: 5–5–3 (home: 3–4–2; road: 2–1–1)

Game	Date	Visitor	Score	Home	OT	Decision	Attendance	Record	Points	Recap
1	October 3	Ottawa	4–3	Toronto	OT	Raycroft	19,476	0–0–1	1	OTL
2	October 4	Toronto	2–3	Ottawa		Toskala	19,857	0–1–1	1	L
3	October 6	Montreal	3–4	Toronto	OT	Toskala	19,476	1–1–1	3	W
4	October 9	Carolina	7–1	Toronto		Toskala	19,224	1–2–1	3	L
5	October 11	N.Y. Islanders	1–8	Toronto		Raycroft	19,319	2–2–1	5	W
6	October 13	Pittsburgh	6–4	Toronto		Toskala	19,479	2–3–1	5	L
7	October 15	Toronto	4–5	Buffalo	OT	Raycroft	18,217	2–3–2	6	OTL
8	October 18	Florida	2–3	Toronto		Toskala	19,349	3–3–2	8	W
9	October 20	Chicago	6–4	Toronto		Raycroft	19,314	3–4–2	8	L
10	October 23	Atlanta	5–4	Toronto	SO	Toskala	19,210	3–4–3	9	OTL
11	October 25	Toronto	5–2	Pittsburgh		Toskala	17,051	4–4–3	11	W
12	October 27	Toronto	4–1	N.Y. Rangers		Toskala	18,200	5–4–3	13	W
13	October 29	Washington	7–1	Toronto		Toskala	19,316	5–5–3	13	L

November: 4–6–3 (home: 1–1–3; road: 3–5–0)

Game	Date	Visitor	Score	Home	OT	Decision	Attendance	Record	Points	Recap
14	November 2	Toronto	2–3	New Jersey		Toskala	14,523	5–6–3	13	L
15	November 3	Toronto	3–2	Montreal		Toskala	21,273	6–6–3	15	W
16	November 6	Toronto	1–5	Ottawa		Toskala	19,613	6–7–3	15	L
17	November 9	Toronto	3–0	Buffalo		Raycroft	18,690	7–7–3	17	W
18	November 10 †	N.Y. Rangers	3–2	Toronto	SO	Toskala	19,503	7–7–4	18	OTL
19	November 13	Montreal	4–3	Toronto	OT	Raycroft	19,595	7–7–5	19	OTL
20	November 15	Toronto	2–5	Boston		Raycroft	16,373	7–8–5	19	L
21	November 17	Ottawa	0–3	Toronto		Toskala	19,596	8–8–5	21	W
22	November 20	Boston	4–2	Toronto		Toskala	19,441	8–9–5	21	L
23	November 23	Toronto	1–3	Dallas		Toskala	18,409	8–10–5	21	L
24	November 24	Toronto	1–5	Phoenix		Raycroft	17,190	8–11–5	21	L
25	November 27	Montreal	4–3	Toronto	SO	Toskala	19,608	8–11–6	22	OTL
26	November 29	Toronto	4–2	Atlanta		Toskala	14,031	9–11–6	24	W

December: 6–5–2 (home: 3–2–0; road: 3–3–2)

Game	Date	Visitor	Score	Home	OT	Decision	Attendance	Record	Points	Recap
27	December 1	Pittsburgh	2–4	Toronto		Toskala	19,534	10–11–6	26	W
28	December 4	Nashville	1–3	Toronto		Toskala	19,400	11–11–6	28	W
29	December 6	Toronto	6–2	N.Y. Rangers		Toskala	18,200	12–11–6	30	W
30	December 8	Boston	2–1	Toronto		Toskala	19,441	12–12–6	30	L
31	December 10	Tampa Bay	1–6	Toronto		Toskala	19,454	13–12–6	32	W
32	December 14	Toronto	4–0	Atlanta		Toskala	16,424	14–12–6	34	W
33	December 15	Toronto	1–4	Montreal		Toskala	21,273	14–13–6	34	L
34	December 18	Toronto	2–3	Carolina	OT	Toskala	17,045	14–13–7	35	OTL
35	December 20	Toronto	1–2	Tampa Bay		Toskala	19,131	14–14–7	35	L
36	December 22	Toronto	2–1	Florida	OT	Toskala	18,500	15–14–7	37	W
37	December 26	Toronto	3–4	N.Y. Islanders	OT	Raycroft	15,301	15–14–8	38	OTL
38	December 27	Toronto	1–4	Philadelphia		Raycroft	19,727	15–15–8	38	L
39	December 29	N.Y. Rangers	6–1	Toronto		Raycroft	19,408	15–16–8	38	L

January: 5–8–1 (home: 4–2–0; road: 1–6–1)

Game	Date	Visitor	Score	Home	OT	Decision	Attendance	Record	Points	Recap
40	January 1	Tampa Bay	3–4	Toronto	SO	Clemmensen	19,347	16–16–8	40	W
41	January 3	Toronto	2–6	Pittsburgh		Clemmensen	17,074	16–17–8	40	L
42	January 5	Philadelphia	3–2	Toronto		Raycroft	19,412	16–18–8	40	L
43	January 9	Toronto	0–5	Anaheim		Toskala	17,174	16–19–8	40	L
44	January 10	Toronto	2–5	Los Angeles		Raycroft	18,118	16–20–8	40	L
45	January 12	Toronto	2–3	San Jose		Toskala	17,496	16–21–8	40	L
46	January 15	Carolina	4–5	Toronto		Toskala	19,444	17–21–8	42	W
47	January 17	Toronto	3–2	Boston	SO	Toskala	13,907	18–21–8	44	W
48	January 19	Buffalo	2–4	Toronto		Toskala	19,436	19–21–8	46	W
49	January 20	Toronto	2–3	New Jersey		Raycroft	15,291	19–22–8	46	L
50	January 23	Washington	2–3	Toronto		Toskala	19,479	20–22–8	48	W
51	January 24	Toronto	1–2	Washington		Toskala	14,094	20–23–8	48	L
52	January 29	St. Louis	3–2	Toronto		Toskala	19,363	20–24–8	48	L
53	January 31	Toronto	2–3	Carolina	OT	Toskala	15,159	20–24–9	49	OTL

February: 8–4–1 (home: 5–3–0; road: 3–1–1)

Game	Date	Visitor	Score	Home	OT	Decision	Attendance	Record	Points	Recap
54	February 2	Ottawa	2–4	Toronto		Toskala	19,543	21–24–9	51	W
55	February 5	Florida	8–0	Toronto		Toskala	19,430	21–25–9	51	L
56	February 7	Toronto	4–2	Montreal		Toskala	21,273	22–25–9	53	W
57	February 9	Detroit	2–3	Toronto	OT	Toskala	19,510	23–25–9	55	W
58	February 13	Toronto	0–1	Buffalo		Toskala	18,690	23–26–9	55	L
59	February 14	NY Islanders	5–4	Toronto		Toskala	19,227	23–27–9	55	L
60	February 16	Boston	3–4	Toronto	OT	Toskala	19,481	24–27–9	57	W
61	February 19	Columbus	1–3	Toronto		Toskala	19,347	25–27–9	59	W
62	February 21	Buffalo	5–1	Toronto		Toskala	19,467	25–28–9	59	L
63	February 23	Atlanta	1–3	Toronto		Toskala	19,390	26–28–9	61	W
64	February 25	Toronto	5–0	Ottawa		Toskala	19,861	27–28–9	63	W
65	February 27	Toronto	4–3	Florida	SO	Toskala	14,557	28–28–9	65	W
66	February 29	Toronto	2–3	Tampa Bay	OT	Toskala	20,641	28–28–10	66	OTL

March: 8–5–0 (home: 2–4–0; road: 6–1–0)

Game	Date	Visitor	Score	Home	OT	Decision	Attendance	Record	Points	Recap
67	March 1	Toronto	3–2	Washington		Toskala	18,277	29–28–10	68	W
68	March 4	New Jersey	4–1	Toronto		Toskala	19,507	29–29–10	68	L
69	March 6	Toronto	8–2	Boston		Toskala	15,483	30–29–10	70	W
70	March 8	New Jersey	2–1	Toronto		Toskala	19,469	30–30–10	70	L
71	March 11	Philadelphia	3–4	Toronto	OT	Toskala	19,507	31–30–10	72	W
72	March 12	Toronto	3–2	Philadelphia		Toskala	19,642	32–30–10	74	W
73	March 15	Buffalo	6–2	Toronto		Toskala	19,462	32–31–10	74	L
74	March 18	Toronto	3–1	NY Islanders		Toskala	13,134	33–31–10	76	W
75	March 21	Toronto	4–1	Buffalo		Toskala	18,690	34–31–10	78	W
76	March 22	Toronto	5–4	Ottawa		Toskala	20,183	35–31–10	80	W
77	March 25	Boston	6–2	Toronto		Toskala	19,562	35–32–10	80	L
78	March 27	Toronto	2–4	Boston		Toskala	16,659	35–33–10	80	L
79	March 29	Montreal	2–4	Toronto		Toskala	19,584	36–33–10	82	W

April: 0–2–1 (home: 0–1–1; road: 0–1–0)

Game	Date	Visitor	Score	Home	OT	Decision	Attendance	Record	Points	Recap
80	April 1	Buffalo	4–3	Toronto	SO	Raycroft	19,288	36–33–11	83	OTL
81	April 3	Ottawa	8–2	Toronto		Toskala	19,466	36–34–11	83	L
82	April 5	Toronto	1–3	Montreal		Raycroft	21,273	36–35–11	83	L

Legend: W Win (2 points) L Loss (0 points) OTL Overtime/shootout loss (1 point)

- † Hockey Hall of Fame Game

== Player statistics ==
Final stats

=== Skaters ===
Regular season
Player	GP	G	A	Pts	+/-	PIM
Mats Sundin	74	32	46	78	17	76
Nik Antropov	72	26	30	56	10	92
Tomas Kaberle	82	8	45	53	-8	22
Jason Blake	82	15	37	52	-4	28
Alexander Steen	76	15	27	42	0	32
Pavel Kubina	72	11	29	40	5	116
Alexei Ponikarovsky	66	18	17	35	3	36
Darcy Tucker	74	18	16	34	-8	100
Matt Stajan	82	16	17	33	-11	47
Bryan McCabe	54	5	18	23	-2	81
Kyle Wellwood	59	8	13	21	-12	0
Ian White	81	5	16	21	-9	44
Hal Gill^{‡}	63	2	18	20	0	52
Boyd Devereaux	62	7	11	18	-6	24
Chad Kilger	53	10	7	17	1	18
Jiri Tlusty	58	10	6	16	-12	14
Dominic Moore^{†}	38	4	10	14	7	14
Mark Bell	35	4	6	10	-2	60
Anton Stralman	50	3	6	9	-10	18
Andy Wozniewski	48	2	7	9	5	54
Carlo Colaiacovo	28	2	4	6	-4	10
John Pohl	33	1	4	5	-4	10
Simon Gamache	11	2	2	4	-1	6
Jeremy Williams	18	2	0	2	-3	4
Kris Newbury	28	1	1	2	-7	32
Wade Belak^{‡}	30	1	0	1	-2	66
Robbie Earl	9	0	1	1	-2	0
Darryl Boyce	1	0	0	0	0	0
Alex Foster	3	0	0	0	0	0
Ben Ondrus	3	0	0	0	-1	5
Bates Battaglia	13	0	0	0	-6	7
Staffan Kronwall	18	0	0	0	-2	7

=== Goaltenders ===
Regular season
Player	GP	GS	TOI	W	L	OT	GA	GAA	SA	SV%	SO	G	A	PIM
Vesa Toskala	66	64	3837	33	25	6	175	2.74	1824	.904	3	0	5	4
Andrew Raycroft	19	16	965	2	9	5	63	3.92	509	.876	1	0	0	0
Scott Clemmensen	3	2	154	1	1	0	10	3.90	62	.839	0	0	0	0

^{†}Denotes player spent time with another team before joining Maple Leafs. Stats reflect time with Maple Leafs only.
^{‡}Traded mid-season.
Bold/italics denotes franchise record.

== Awards and records ==
=== Records ===
- On October 11, 2007, in an 8–1 victory over the New York Islanders, Mats Sundin scored his 390th goal as a Leaf, and earned his 917th point in a Leaf uniform breaking Darryl Sittler's team record as the all-time points and goals leader.

=== Milestones ===
Regular Season
Player	Milestone	Reached
Tomas Kaberle	600th NHL Game	October 3, 2007
Darcy Tucker	1,200th NHL PIM	October 9, 2007
Matt Stajan	100th NHL Point	October 11, 2007
Andy Wozniewski	1st NHL Goal	October 11, 2007
Bryan McCabe	1,500th NHL PIM	October 13, 2007
Mats Sundin	1,000th NHL PIM	October 13, 2007
Nik Antropov	200th NHL Point	October 18, 2007
Pavel Kubina	600th NHL Game	October 18, 2007
Wade Belak	400th NHL Game	October 20, 2007
Chad Kilger	100th NHL Goal	October 20, 2007
Anton Stralman	1st NHL Game	October 23, 2007
Jiri Tlusty	1st NHL Game; 1st NHL Goal; 1st NHL Point	October 25, 2007
Ian White	100th NHL Game	October 27, 2007
Jason Blake	300th NHL Point	November 2, 2007
Jiri Tlusty	1st NHL Assist	November 2, 2007
Mats Sundin	400th Goal with the Leafs	November 27, 2007
Scott Clemmensen	1st NHL Win with the Leafs	January 1, 2008
Anton Stralman	1st NHL Goal	March 21, 2008

== Transactions ==
The Maple Leafs have been involved in the following transactions during the 2007–08 season.

=== Trades ===
June 22, 2007	To Toronto Maple Leafs Vesa Toskala; Mark Bell	To San Jose Sharks 1st round pick in 2007 (Lars Eller); 2nd round pick in 2007 (Aaron Palushaj); 4th round pick in 2009 (Craig Smith)
February 26, 2008	To Toronto Maple Leafs 5th round pick in 2008 (Jerome Flaake)	To Florida Panthers Wade Belak
February 26, 2008	To Toronto Maple Leafs 3rd round pick in 2008 (James Livingston)	To Florida Panthers Chad Kilger
February 26, 2008	To Toronto Maple Leafs 2nd round pick in 2008 (Jimmy Hayes); 5th round pick in 2009 (Andy Bathgate)	To Pittsburgh Penguins Hal Gill

=== Free agents ===
Player	Former team	Contract Terms
Jason Blake	New York Islanders	5-year, $20 million
Scott Clemmensen	New Jersey Devils	1 year, $500,000

Player	New team
Yanic Perreault	Chicago Blackhawks

=== Claimed from waivers ===
Player	Former team	Date claimed off waivers
Dominic Moore	Minnesota Wild	January 11, 2008

== Draft picks ==
Toronto's picks at the 2007 NHL entry draft in Columbus, Ohio.

Round	#	Player	Position	Nationality	College/Junior/Club team (League)
3	74	Dale Mitchell	RW	Canada	Oshawa Generals (OHL)
4	99	Matt Frattin	RW	Canada	Fort Saskatchewan Traders (AJHL)
4	104	Ben Winnett	LW	Canada	Salmon Arm Silverbacks (BCHL)
5	134	Juraj Mikus	D	Slovakia	Dukla Trenčín (Slovak Extraliga)
6	164	Chris DiDomenico	C	Canada	Saint John Sea Dogs (QJHML)
7	194	Carl Gunnarsson	D	Sweden	Linköpings HC (Elitserien)

== See also ==
- 2007–08 NHL season
