= 2007–08 New Jersey Devils season =

National Hockey League season

2007–08 New Jersey Devils
- Division: 2nd Atlantic
- Conference: 4th Eastern
- 2007–08 record: 46–29–7
- Home record: 25–14–2
- Road record: 21–15–5
- Goals for: 206
- Goals against: 197

Team information
- General manager: Lou Lamoriello
- Coach: Brent Sutter
- Captain: Vacant (Oct.–Dec.); Jamie Langenbrunner (Dec.–Apr.)
- Alternate captains: Patrik Elias (Oct.–Feb., Mar.–Apr.); Brian Gionta (Oct.–Dec.); Jamie Langenbrunner (Oct.–Dec.); Dainius Zubrus (Oct.–Dec.); John Madden (Dec.–Apr.); Paul Martin (Dec.); Colin White (Jan., Mar.)
- Arena: Prudential Center
- Average attendance: 15,564 (88.3%)

Team leaders
- Goals: Zach Parise (32)
- Assists: Patrik Elias (35)
- Points: Zach Parise (65)
- Penalty minutes: David Clarkson (183)
- Plus/minus: Johnny Oduya (+27)
- Wins: Martin Brodeur (44)
- Goals against average: Martin Brodeur (2.17)

The 2007–08 New Jersey Devils season was the 34th season for the National Hockey League (NHL) franchise that was established on June 11, 1974, and 26th season since the franchise relocated from Colorado prior to the 1982–83 NHL season. It was the first season the team had played home games anywhere other than Continental Airlines Arena, as the Devils relocated to the newly built Prudential Center in Newark, New Jersey. The season was Brent Sutter's first as head coach.

== Regular season ==
Under new coach Brent Sutter and many roster changes, including the departures of defenseman Brian Rafalski in free agency to his hometown Detroit Red Wings, and center Scott Gomez to the Devils arch rival New York Rangers, the Devils began the first nine games of the season on the road while construction was being finished up for the Devils new home arena, the Prudential Center. The team struggled in the first 19 games, going 7–10–2. The Devils were shut out a league-high 11 times during the regular season. Despite this, they still qualified for the playoffs with 99 points, placing second in the Atlantic Division and fourth in the Eastern Conference.

- November 17, 2007: In an impressive 6-2 victory over the Philadelphia Flyers, Martin Brodeur earned his 500th career win.

=== Divisional standings ===
Atlantic Division
		GP	W	L	OTL	GF	GA	Pts
**1**	**Pittsburgh Penguins**	**82**	**47**	**27**	**8**	**247**	**216**	**102**
**2**	**New Jersey Devils**	**82**	**46**	**29**	**7**	**206**	**197**	**99**
**3**	**New York Rangers**	**82**	**42**	**27**	**13**	**213**	**199**	**97**
**4**	**Philadelphia Flyers**	**82**	**42**	**29**	**11**	**248**	**233**	**95**
5	New York Islanders	82	35	38	9	194	243	79

=== Conference standings ===
Eastern Conference
R		Div	GP	W	L	OTL	GF	GA	Pts
**1**	**z – Montreal Canadiens**	**NE**	**82**	**47**	**25**	**10**	**262**	**222**	104
**2**	**y – Pittsburgh Penguins**	**AT**	**82**	**47**	**27**	**8**	**247**	**216**	102
**3**	**y – Washington Capitals**	**SE**	**82**	**43**	**31**	**8**	**242**	**231**	94
**4**	**New Jersey Devils**	**AT**	**82**	**46**	**29**	**7**	**206**	**197**	99
**5**	**New York Rangers**	**AT**	**82**	**42**	**27**	**13**	**213**	**199**	97
**6**	**Philadelphia Flyers**	**AT**	**82**	**42**	**29**	**11**	**248**	**233**	95
**7**	**Ottawa Senators**	**NE**	**82**	**43**	**31**	**8**	**261**	**247**	94
**8**	**Boston Bruins**	**NE**	**82**	**41**	**29**	**12**	**212**	**222**	94
8.5
9	Carolina Hurricanes	SE	82	43	33	6	252	249	92
10	Buffalo Sabres	NE	82	39	31	12	255	242	90
11	Florida Panthers	SE	82	38	35	9	216	226	85
12	Toronto Maple Leafs	NE	82	36	35	11	231	260	83
13	New York Islanders	AT	82	35	38	9	194	243	79
14	Atlanta Thrashers	SE	82	34	40	8	216	272	76
15	Tampa Bay Lightning	SE	82	31	42	9	223	267	71

Divisions: AT – Atlantic, NE – Northeast, SE – Southeast

bold – qualified for playoffs, y – division winner, z – placed first in conference (and division)

== Playoffs ==
The New Jersey Devils clinched a playoff spot following a 2–1 overtime victory against the New York Islanders on April 1, 2008, their 79th game of the season. They were the third team in the East to clinch a spot in the playoffs, and finished fourth in the Eastern Conference with 99 points. This was their 11th consecutive trip to the playoffs, and their 18th overall since making the playoffs for the first time during the 1987–88 season.

The New Jersey Devils played the New York Rangers in the Eastern Conference Quarterfinals, losing the series 4–1, including three losses at their home arena in Newark. This was the fifth meeting between the two clubs. The Rangers took the first three series, winning 4 games to 3 in the 1992 Patrick Division Semi-finals, 4–3 again in the 1994 Eastern Conference Finals, and 4–1 in the 1997 Eastern Conference Semifinals. Most recently, the Devils swept the Rangers in the 2006 Eastern Conference Quarterfinals.

== Schedule and results ==
=== Preseason ===
2007 preseason
Preseason: 4–2–0

Game	Date	Score	Opponent	Location	Record	Recap
1	September 17	2–3	Philadelphia Flyers	Sovereign Bank Arena	0–1–0	L
2	September 20	3–0	Boston Bruins	Verizon Wireless Arena	1–1–0	W
3	September 21	3–4	New York Rangers	Madison Square Garden	1–2–0	L
4	September 24	3–1	Philadelphia Flyers	Wachovia Center	2–2–0	W
5	September 26	6–1	New York Islanders	Tsongas Arena	3–2–0	W
6	September 29	2–1	New York Islanders	Arena at Harbor Yard	4–2–0	W

Legend: W Win (2 points) L Loss (0 points) OTL Overtime/shootout loss (1 point)

=== Regular season ===
2007–08 regular season
October: 4–6–1 (home: 1–1–0; road: 3–5–1)

Game	Date	Visitor	Score	Home	OT	Decision	Attendance	Record	Pts	Recap
1	October 4	New Jersey	1 – 3	Tampa Bay		Brodeur	19,454	0–1–0	0	L
2	October 6	New Jersey	4 – 1	Florida		Weekes	19,250	1–1–0	2	W
3	October 8	New Jersey	2 – 4	Ottawa		Brodeur	18,260	1–2–0	2	L
4	October 11	New Jersey	0 – 3	Florida		Brodeur	10,847	1–3–0	2	L
5	October 13	New Jersey	6 – 5	Atlanta		Brodeur	15,606	2–3–0	4	W
6	October 17	New Jersey	5 – 4	Pittsburgh		Brodeur	16,990	3–3–0	6	W
7	October 18	New Jersey	0 – 4	Philadelphia		Brodeur	19,113	3–4–0	6	L
8	October 20	New Jersey	3 – 4	NY Islanders	OT	Weekes	14,092	3–4–1	7	OTL
9	October 25	New Jersey	0 – 2	NY Rangers		Brodeur	18,200	3–5–1	7	L
10	October 27	Ottawa	4 – 1	New Jersey		Brodeur	17,625	3–6–1	7	L
11	October 31	Tampa Bay	1 – 6	New Jersey		Brodeur	13,218	4–6–1	9	W

November: 9–4–1 (home: 4–3–0; road: 5–1–1)

Game	Date	Visitor	Score	Home	OT	Decision	Attendance	Record	Pts	Recap
12	November 2	Toronto	2 – 3	New Jersey		Brodeur	14,523	5–6–1	11	W
13	November 3	New Jersey	1 – 2	NY Rangers	SO	Brodeur	18,200	5–6–2	12	OTL
14	November 5	Pittsburgh	5 – 0	New Jersey		Brodeur	14,032	5–7–2	12	L
15	November 8	Philadelphia	1 – 4	New Jersey		Brodeur	14,948	6–7–2	14	W
16	November 10	New Jersey	1 – 2	NY Islanders		Brodeur	15,361	6–8–2	14	L
17	November 12	New Jersey	3 – 2	Pittsburgh		Weekes	17,096	7–8–2	16	W
18	November 14	NY Rangers	4 – 2	New Jersey		Brodeur	17,625	7–9–2	16	L
19	November 16	NY Islanders	1 – 0	New Jersey		Brodeur	15,076	7–10–2	16	L
20	November 17	New Jersey	6 – 2	Philadelphia		Brodeur	19,621	8–10–2	18	W
21	November 21	New Jersey	2 – 1	Pittsburgh		Brodeur	17,132	9–10–2	20	W
22	November 23	New Jersey	3 – 0	Atlanta		Brodeur	18,545	10–10–2	22	W
23	November 24	New Jersey	3 – 2	Tampa Bay		Brodeur	19,077	11–10–2	24	W
24	November 28	Dallas	2 – 4	New Jersey		Brodeur	13,665	12–10–2	26	W
25	November 30	Montreal	0 – 4	New Jersey		Brodeur	15,081	13–10–2	28	W

December: 7–4–1 (home: 4–1–0; road: 3–3–1)

Game	Date	Visitor	Score	Home	OT	Decision	Attendance	Record	Pts	Recap
26	December 2	Atlanta	2 – 3	New Jersey	SO	Brodeur	14,978	14–10–2	30	W
27	December 5	Boston	3 – 4	New Jersey	OT	Brodeur	14,012	15–10–2	32	W
28	December 7	Washington	2 – 3	New Jersey		Brodeur	16,265	16–10–2	34	W
29	December 9	New Jersey	0 – 1	NY Rangers	OT	Brodeur	18,200	16–10–3	35	OTL
30	December 10	New Jersey	2 – 3	Washington		Weekes	10,719	16–11–3	35	L
31	December 13	New Jersey	3 – 1	Boston		Brodeur	12,064	17–11–3	37	W
32	December 15	Phoenix	4 – 1	New Jersey		Brodeur	16,636	17–12–3	37	L
33	December 16	Philadelphia	2 – 4	New Jersey		Brodeur	16,687	18–12–3	39	W
34	December 18	New Jersey	0 – 5	Vancouver		Brodeur	18,630	18–13–3	39	L
35	December 21	New Jersey	3 – 1	Edmonton		Brodeur	16,839	19–13–3	41	W
36	December 23	New Jersey	1 – 0	Calgary	OT	Brodeur	19,289	20–13–3	43	W
37	December 28	Buffalo	1 – 2	New Jersey	SO	Brodeur	17,625	21–13–3	45	W
38	December 29	New Jersey	2 – 5	NY Islanders		Brodeur	16,234	21–14–3	45	L

January: 7–5–0 (home: 4–4–0; road: 3–1–0)

Game	Date	Visitor	Score	Home	OT	Decision	Attendance	Record	Pts	Recap
39	January 2	Florida	2 – 3	New Jersey		Brodeur	14,124	22–14–3	47	W
40	January 4	Philadelphia	0 – 3	New Jersey		Brodeur	17,625	23–14–3	49	W
41	January 5	New Jersey	3 – 4	Boston		Weekes	17,565	23–15–3	49	L
42	January 8	Buffalo	1 – 2	New Jersey	SO	Brodeur	14,030	24–15–3	51	W
43	January 10	New Jersey	4 – 1	Carolina		Brodeur	17,173	25–15–3	53	W
44	January 12	New Jersey	3 – 2	Buffalo	SO	Brodeur	18,690	26–15–3	55	W
45	January 16	NY Islanders	3 – 1	New Jersey		Brodeur	15,975	26–16–3	55	L
46	January 18	Florida	2 – 1	New Jersey		Brodeur	15,203	26–17–3	55	L
47	January 20	Toronto	2 – 3	New Jersey		Brodeur	15,291	27–17–3	57	W
48	January 22	New Jersey	7 – 3	Philadelphia		Brodeur	19,677	28–17–3	59	W
49	January 24	Montreal	4 – 3	New Jersey		Brodeur	14,257	28–18–3	59	L
50	January 29	Pittsburgh	4 – 2	New Jersey		Brodeur	13,595	28–19–3	59	L

February: 9–3–3 (home: 7–3–1; road: 2–0–2)

Game	Date	Visitor	Score	Home	OT	Decision	Attendance	Record	Pts	Recap
51	February 1	NY Rangers	3 – 1	New Jersey		Brodeur	17,625	28–20–3	59	L
52	February 2	Los Angeles	3 – 6	New Jersey		Brodeur	15,279	29–20–3	61	W
53	February 4	Pittsburgh	3 – 4	New Jersey	OT	Brodeur	13,012	30–20–3	63	W
54	February 6	New Jersey	2 – 3	Buffalo	SO	Brodeur	18,690	30–20–4	64	OTL
55	February 8	Anaheim	2 – 1	New Jersey		Brodeur	15,332	30–21–4	64	L
56	February 9	Carolina	1 – 6	New Jersey		Brodeur	16,257	31–21–4	66	W
57	February 13	Ottawa	2 – 3	New Jersey	OT	Brodeur	12,339	32–21–4	68	W
58	February 15	Atlanta	4 – 3	New Jersey	SO	Brodeur	14,475	32–21–5	69	OTL
59	February 16	New Jersey	3 – 2	Ottawa		Brodeur	20,201	33–21–5	71	W
60	February 18	Carolina	1 – 5	New Jersey		Brodeur	16,182	34–21–5	73	W
61	February 20	San Jose	2 – 3	New Jersey		Brodeur	13,855	35–21–5	75	W
62	February 23	NY Islanders	2 – 4	New Jersey		Brodeur	17,625	36–21–5	77	W
63	February 24	New Jersey	2 – 1	Washington	OT	Brodeur	18,277	37–21–5	79	W
64	February 26	New Jersey	1 – 2	Carolina	OT	Brodeur	15,466	37–21–6	80	OTL
65	February 29	Washington	4 – 0	New Jersey		Brodeur	16,580	37–22–6	80	L

March: 6–6–1 (home: 2–2–1; road: 4–4–0)

Game	Date	Visitor	Score	Home	OT	Decision	Attendance	Record	Pts	Recap
66	March 1	New Jersey	1 – 2	Montreal		Brodeur	21,273	37–23–6	80	L
67	March 4	New Jersey	4 – 1	Toronto		Brodeur	19,507	38–23–6	82	W
68	March 7	Tampa Bay	1 – 2	New Jersey	OT	Brodeur	15,670	39–23–6	84	W
69	March 8	New Jersey	2 – 1	Toronto		Brodeur	19,469	40–23–6	86	W
70	March 11	New Jersey	0 – 4	Montreal		Brodeur	21,273	40–24–6	86	L
71	March 13	New Jersey	4 – 3	Minnesota	SO	Brodeur	18,568	41–24–6	88	W
72	March 15	New Jersey	4 – 2	Colorado		Brodeur	18,007	42–24–6	90	W
73	March 19	NY Rangers	2 – 1	New Jersey	SO	Brodeur	17,625	42–24–7	91	OTL
74	March 21	NY Islanders	3 – 1	New Jersey		Brodeur	17,075	42–25–7	91	L
75	March 22	New Jersey	1 – 7	Pittsburgh		Brodeur	17,132	42–26–7	91	L
76	March 25	Pittsburgh	2 – 0	New Jersey		Brodeur	16,292	42–27–7	91	L
77	March 27	New Jersey	2 – 3	NY Rangers		Brodeur	18,200	42–28–7	91	L
78	March 28	Philadelphia	4 – 5	New Jersey	SO	Brodeur	17,056	43–28–7	93	W

April: 3–1–0 (home: 2–0–0; road: 1–1–0)

Game	Date	Visitor	Score	Home	OT	Decision	Attendance	Record	Pts	Recap
79	April 1	New Jersey	2 – 1	NY Islanders	OT	Brodeur	12,357	44–28–7	95	W
80	April 2	Boston	3 – 4	New Jersey	SO	Brodeur	16,144	45–28–7	97	W
81	April 4	New Jersey	0 – 3	Philadelphia		Brodeur	19,957	45–29–7	97	L
82	April 6	NY Rangers	2 – 3	New Jersey	SO	Brodeur	17,625	46–29–7	99	W

Legend: W Win (2 points) L Loss (0 points) OTL Overtime/shootout loss (1 point)

=== Playoffs ===
2008 Stanley Cup playoffs
Eastern Conference Quarterfinals vs. (5) New York Rangers – Rangers win 4–1

Game	Date	Visitor	Score	Home	OT	Decision	Attendance	Series	Recap
1	April 9	NY Rangers	4 – 1	New Jersey		Brodeur	17,625	0 – 1	L
2	April 11	NY Rangers	2 – 1	New Jersey		Brodeur	17,625	0 – 2	L
3	April 13	New Jersey	4 – 3	NY Rangers	OT	Brodeur	18,200	1 – 2	W
4	April 16	New Jersey	3 – 5	NY Rangers		Brodeur	18,200	1 – 3	L
5	April 18	NY Rangers	5 – 3	New Jersey		Brodeur	17,625	1 – 4	L

Legend: W Win L Loss

== Player statistics ==
=== Regular season ===
Scoring

Player	Pos	GP	G	A	Pts	PIM	+/-	PPG	SHG	GWG
Zach Parise	LW	81	32	33	65	25	13	10	1	8
Patrik Elias	LW	74	20	35	55	38	10	7	0	8
Brian Gionta	RW	82	22	31	53	46	1	8	1	4
John Madden	C	80	20	23	43	26	1	3	3	3
Jamie Langenbrunner	RW	64	13	28	41	30	-1	5	1	2
Dainius Zubrus	C	82	13	25	38	38	2	4	0	2
Travis Zajac	C	82	14	20	34	31	-11	5	0	1
Paul Martin	D	73	5	27	32	22	20	2	0	2
Johnny Oduya	D	75	6	20	26	46	27	2	0	0
Jay Pandolfo	LW	54	12	12	24	22	10	0	0	1
David Clarkson	RW	81	9	13	22	183	1	0	0	1
Mike Mottau	D	76	4	13	17	48	-11	1	0	1
Sergei Brylin	LW	82	6	10	16	20	-5	0	0	1
Karel Rachunek	D	47	4	9	13	40	3	0	0	0
Arron Asham	RW	77	6	4	10	84	-6	0	0	2
Andy Greene	D	59	2	8	10	22	0	2	0	0
Colin White	D	57	2	8	10	26	-5	0	0	1
Mike Rupp	C	64	3	6	9	58	-8	1	0	0
Sheldon Brookbank	D	44	0	8	8	63	0	0	0	0
Vitaly Vishnevski	D	69	2	5	7	50	-12	0	0	0
Rod Pelley	C	58	2	4	6	19	-3	0	0	1
Martin Brodeur	G	77	0	4	4	6	0	0	0	0
Noah Clarke	LW	1	1	0	1	0	0	0	0	0
Nicklas Bergfors	RW	1	0	0	0	0	-1	0	0	0
Olli Malmivaara	D	2	0	0	0	0	2	0	0	0
Bryce Salvador	D	8	0	0	0	11	0	0	0	0
Barry Tallackson	RW	3	0	0	0	0	0	0	0	0
Kevin Weekes	G	9	0	0	0	2	0	0	0	0

Goaltending

Player	MIN	GP	W	L	T/OT	GA	GAA	SO	SA	SV	SV%
Martin Brodeur	4635	77	44	27	6	168	2.17	4	2089	1921	.920
Kevin Weekes	343	9	2	2	1	17	2.97	0	160	143	.894
Team:	4978	82	46	29	7	185	2.23	4	2249	2064	.918

=== Playoffs ===
Scoring

Player	Pos	GP	G	A	Pts	PIM	PPG	SHG	GWG
Patrik Elias	LW	5	4	2	6	4	3	0	0
Zach Parise	LW	5	1	4	5	2	1	0	0
Jamie Langenbrunner	RW	5	0	4	4	4	0	0	0
John Madden	C	5	2	1	3	2	0	0	1
Paul Martin	D	5	1	2	3	2	1	0	0
Sergei Brylin	LW	5	1	0	1	0	0	0	0
Brian Gionta	RW	5	1	0	1	2	0	0	0
Mike Mottau	D	5	1	0	1	0	0	0	0
Bryce Salvador	D	5	1	0	1	2	0	0	0
Arron Asham	RW	5	0	1	1	2	0	0	0
Johnny Oduya	D	5	0	1	1	6	0	0	0
Mike Rupp	C	5	0	1	1	2	0	0	0
Travis Zajac	C	5	0	1	1	4	0	0	0
Dainius Zubrus	C	5	0	1	1	8	0	0	0
Martin Brodeur	G	5	0	0	0	2	0	0	0
David Clarkson	RW	5	0	0	0	4	0	0	0
Andy Greene	D	2	0	0	0	0	0	0	0
Jay Pandolfo	LW	5	0	0	0	2	0	0	0
Vitaly Vishnevski	D	3	0	0	0	2	0	0	0
Colin White	D	5	0	0	0	6	0	0	0

Goaltending

Player	MIN	GP	W	L	GA	GAA	SO	SA	SV	SV%
Martin Brodeur	301	5	1	4	16	3.19	0	147	131	.891
Team:	301	5	1	4	16	3.19	0	147	131	.891

Note: GP = Games played; G = Goals; A = Assists; Pts = Points; +/- = Plus/minus; PIM = Penalty minutes; PPG = Power-play goals; SHG = Short-handed goals; GWG = Game-winning goals
MIN = Minutes played; W = Wins; L = Losses; T/OT = Ties/overtime losses; GA = Goals against; GAA = Goals against average; SO = Shutouts; SA = Shots against; SV = Shots saved; SV% = Save percentage;

== Awards and records ==
=== Awards ===
Regular Season
Player	Award	Awarded
Martin Brodeur	Vezina Trophy	End of regular season
Martin Brodeur	NHL Second All-Star Team – Goaltender	End of regular season
Martin Brodeur	NHL Second Star of the Week	December 2, 2007
Martin Brodeur	NHL Third Star of the Week	February 24, 2008
Martin Brodeur	NHL Second Star of the Week	March 9, 2008

=== Nominations ===
Regular Season
Player	Award	Place
John Madden	Frank J. Selke Trophy	Runner-Up

=== Milestones ===
Regular Season
Player	Milestone	Reached
Nicklas Bergfors	1st NHL Game	October 4, 2007
Brian Gionta	200th NHL Point	October 4, 2007
Mike Rupp	200th NHL Game	October 6, 2007
Mike Mottau	1st NHL Goal	October 6, 2007
Zach Parise	100th NHL Point	October 13, 2007
Rod Pelley	1st NHL Assist; 1st NHL Point	October 20, 2007
Martin Brodeur	900th NHL Game	October 31, 2007
Dainius Zubrus	700th NHL Game	October 31, 2007
Olli Malmivaara	1st NHL Game	October 31, 2007
Jay Pandolfo	1st NHL Hat-trick	October 31, 2007
Rod Pelley	1st NHL Goal	November 8, 2007
Vitaly Vishnevski	500th NHL Game	November 12, 2007
Sergei Brylin	700th NHL Game	November 12, 2007
Travis Zajac	100th NHL Game	November 17, 2007
Karel Rachunek	200th NHL PIM	November 17, 2007
Martin Brodeur	500th NHL Win	November 17, 2007
Zach Parise	1st NHL Hat-trick	November 30, 2007
Johnny Oduya	100th NHL Game	November 30, 2007
Brian Gionta	100th NHL Assist	December 5, 2007
Patrik Elias	700th NHL Game	December 13, 2007
Sergei Brylin	300th NHL Point	December 28, 2007
Zach Parise	200th NHL Game	December 29, 2007
Paul Martin	100th NHL Point	January 4, 2008
Aaron Asham	500th NHL PIM	January 4, 2008
David Clarkson	100th NHL PIM	January 10, 2008
John Madden	600th NHL Game	January 12, 2008
Patrik Elias	600th NHL Point	January 22, 2008
Colin White	500th NHL Game	February 8, 2008
Jay Pandolfo	200th NHL Point	February 20, 2008
Johnny Oduya	100th NHL PIM	February 24, 2008
Colin White	700th NHL PIM	March 22, 2008
Jay Pandolfo	700th NHL Game	March 25, 2008
Paul Martin	300th NHL Game	March 27, 2008
Jamie Langenbrunner	800th NHL Game	April 1, 2008
Paul Martin	100th NHL Assist	April 6, 2008

== Transactions ==
The Devils have been involved in the following transactions during the 2007–08 season.

=== Trades ===
February 26, 2008	To New Jersey Devils Bryce Salvador	To St. Louis Blues Cam Janssen

=== Free agents ===
Player	Former team	Contract Terms
Dainius Zubrus	Buffalo Sabres	6 year, $20.4 million
Karel Rachunek	New York Rangers	1 year, $1.4 million
Kevin Weekes	New York Rangers	2 years, $1.375 million
Vitaly Vishnevski	Nashville Predators	3 years, $5.4 million
Noah Clarke	Los Angeles Kings	1 year, $475,000
Arron Asham	New York Islanders	1 year, $700,000

Player	New team
Brian Rafalski	Detroit Red Wings
Scott Gomez	New York Rangers
Brad Lukowich	Tampa Bay Lightning
Scott Clemmensen	Toronto Maple Leafs
Richard Matvichuk	Columbus Blue Jackets
Jim Fahey	Chicago Blackhawks
Jim Dowd	Philadelphia Flyers
Alex Brooks	St. Louis Blues

== Draft picks ==
New Jersey's picks at the 2007 NHL entry draft in Columbus, Ohio.

Round	#	Player	Position	Nationality	College/Junior/Club team (League)
2	57	Mike Hoeffel	Wing	United States	U.S. National Team Development Program (NAHL)
3	79	Nick Palmieri	Wing	United States	Erie Otters (OHL)
3	87	Corbin McPherson	Defense	United States	Cowichan Valley Capitals (BCHL)
4	117	Matt Halischuk	Right wing	Canada	Kitchener Rangers (OHL)
6	177	Vili Sopanen	Wing	Finland	Lahti Pelicans
7	207	Ryan Molle	Defense	Canada	Swift Current Broncos (WHL)

== Media ==
Television coverage was on FSN New York (formerly SportsChannel New York and FOX Sports Net New York) with Mike Emrick and Chico Resch providing play-by-play with Steve Cangialosi and former Devil Ken Daneyko as color commentators. FSN New York, which was owned by Cablevision which at the time also owned MSG Network, was re-branded MSG Plus the following season. Radio coverage was still on WFAN 660 with Matt Loughlin and Sherry Ross.

== See also ==
- 2007–08 NHL season
