= 2007–08 New York Islanders season =

NHL hockey team season

2007–08 New York Islanders
- Division: 5th Atlantic
- Conference: 13th Eastern
- 2007–08 record: 35–38–9
- Home record: 18–18–5
- Road record: 17–20–4
- Goals for: 194
- Goals against: 243

Team information
- General manager: Garth Snow
- Coach: Ted Nolan; Al Arbour (1 game)
- Captain: Bill Guerin
- Alternate captains: Mike Sillinger; Brendan Witt
- Arena: Nassau Veterans Memorial Coliseum
- Average attendance: 13,640 (84%)

Team leaders
- Goals: Bill Guerin (23)
- Assists: Trent Hunter (29)
- Points: Mike Comrie (49)
- Penalty minutes: Mike Comrie (87)
- Plus/minus: Kyle Okposo (+3)
- Wins: Rick DiPietro (26)
- Goals against average: Wade Dubielewicz (2.70)

The 2007–08 New York Islanders season was the 36th season in the franchise's history in the National Hockey League (NHL). The team finished with a record of 35–38–9, placing 13th in the Eastern Conference and 5th in the Atlantic Division. Despite high expectations following a playoff appearance the previous year, the Islanders missed the playoffs, failing to qualify for the first time since the 2005–06 season. The team was coached by Ted Nolan, with Bill Guerin serving as captain. A notable highlight of the season was Al Arbour returning to coach his 1,500th game with the franchise on November 3, 2007, a milestone celebrated with a banner-raising ceremony. Offensively, the Islanders struggled, finishing last among all 30 NHL teams in goals scored during regulation play.

== Offseason ==
Key dates prior to the start of the season:

- The 2007 NHL entry draft took place in Columbus, Ohio on June 22–23
- The free agency period began on July 1.

Forward Bill Guerin was named team captain, replacing departed forward Alexei Yashin.

== Regular season ==
Excluding five shootout-winning goals, the Islanders finished the regular season with 189 goals for, the fewest of all 30 teams in the NHL. They also allowed the most shorthanded goals in the NHL, with 15.

=== Significant events ===
An early season highlight occurred on November 3, 2007, when Al Arbour returned to coach his 1,500th game for the Islanders at the behest of Ted Nolan, who wanted Arbour's regular season games coached total to reach 1,500, a round number. The Islanders came from behind to defeat the Pittsburgh Penguins 3–2, which extended Arbour's NHL record for most games coached with one team and extended his NHL record 740 regular season wins with one team. Afterwards, in a post-game ceremony, the Islanders raised a new banner to honor Arbour's 1500th game coached for the Islanders.

On January 22, 2008, the Islanders scored three short-handed goals in a 6–3 win over the Carolina Hurricanes.

== Standings ==
Atlantic Division
		GP	W	L	OTL	GF	GA	Pts
**1**	**Pittsburgh Penguins**	**82**	**47**	**27**	**8**	**247**	**216**	**102**
**2**	**New Jersey Devils**	**82**	**46**	**29**	**7**	**206**	**197**	**99**
**3**	**New York Rangers**	**82**	**42**	**27**	**13**	**213**	**199**	**97**
**4**	**Philadelphia Flyers**	**82**	**42**	**29**	**11**	**248**	**233**	**95**
5	New York Islanders	82	35	38	9	194	243	79

=== Conference standings ===
Eastern Conference
R		Div	GP	W	L	OTL	GF	GA	Pts
**1**	**z – Montreal Canadiens**	**NE**	**82**	**47**	**25**	**10**	**262**	**222**	104
**2**	**y – Pittsburgh Penguins**	**AT**	**82**	**47**	**27**	**8**	**247**	**216**	102
**3**	**y – Washington Capitals**	**SE**	**82**	**43**	**31**	**8**	**242**	**231**	94
**4**	**New Jersey Devils**	**AT**	**82**	**46**	**29**	**7**	**206**	**197**	99
**5**	**New York Rangers**	**AT**	**82**	**42**	**27**	**13**	**213**	**199**	97
**6**	**Philadelphia Flyers**	**AT**	**82**	**42**	**29**	**11**	**248**	**233**	95
**7**	**Ottawa Senators**	**NE**	**82**	**43**	**31**	**8**	**261**	**247**	94
**8**	**Boston Bruins**	**NE**	**82**	**41**	**29**	**12**	**212**	**222**	94
8.5
9	Carolina Hurricanes	SE	82	43	33	6	252	249	92
10	Buffalo Sabres	NE	82	39	31	12	255	242	90
11	Florida Panthers	SE	82	38	35	9	216	226	85
12	Toronto Maple Leafs	NE	82	36	35	11	231	260	83
13	New York Islanders	AT	82	35	38	9	194	243	79
14	Atlanta Thrashers	SE	82	34	40	8	216	272	76
15	Tampa Bay Lightning	SE	82	31	42	9	223	267	71

Divisions: AT – Atlantic, NE – Northeast, SE – Southeast

bold – qualified for playoffs, y – division winner, z – placed first in conference (and division)

== Schedule and results ==
2007–08 regular season
October: 5–4–0 (home: 3–2–0; road: 2–2–0)

Game	Date	Visitor	Score	Home	OT	Decision	Attendance	Record	Points	Recap
1	October 5	NY Islanders	6 – 4	Buffalo		DiPietro	18,690	1–0–0	2	W
2	October 6	Buffalo	2 – 3	NY Islanders		DiPietro	16,234	2–0–0	4	W
3	October 8	Washington	2 – 1	NY Islanders		DiPietro	16,234	2–1–0	4	L
4	October 10	NY Rangers	1 – 2	NY Islanders		DiPietro	15,295	3–1–0	6	W
5	October 11	NY Islanders	1 – 8	Toronto		Dubielewicz	19,319	3–2–0	6	L
6	October 13	NY Islanders	1 – 3	Philadelphia		DiPietro	19,714	3–3–0	6	L
7	October 18	NY Islanders	5 – 2	Washington		DiPietro	11,036	4–3–0	8	W
8	October 20	New Jersey	3 – 4	NY Islanders	OT	DiPietro	14,092	5–3–0	10	W
9	October 27	Carolina	8 – 3	NY Islanders		DiPietro	13,136	5–4–0	10	L

November: 8–5–1 (home: 6–1–1; road: 2–4–0)

Game	Date	Visitor	Score	Home	OT	Decision	Attendance	Record	Points	Recap
10	November 1	Tampa Bay	0 – 4	NY Islanders		DiPietro	11,008	6–4–0	12	W
11	November 3	Pittsburgh	2 – 3	NY Islanders		Dubielewicz	16,234	7–4–0	14	W
12	November 6	NY Rangers	2 – 3	NY Islanders		DiPietro	15,158	8–4–0	16	W
13	November 10	New Jersey	1 – 2	NY Islanders		DiPietro	15,361	9–4–0	18	W
14	November 12	NY Islanders	2 – 3	Philadelphia		DiPietro	19,312	9–5–0	18	L
15	November 15	NY Islanders	2 – 3	Pittsburgh		DiPietro	16,972	9–6–0	18	L
16	November 16	NY Islanders	1 – 0	New Jersey		DiPietro	15,076	10–6–0	20	W
17	November 19	NY Islanders	2 – 1	NY Rangers		DiPietro	18,200	11–6–0	22	W
18	November 21	Montreal	4 – 1	NY Islanders		DiPietro	13,153	11–7–0	22	L
19	November 23	NY Islanders	1 – 2	Boston		DiPietro	17,565	11–8–0	22	L
20	November 24	Boston	1 – 2	NY Islanders		DiPietro	16,234	12–8–0	24	W
21	November 26	Dallas	3 – 2	NY Islanders	OT	DiPietro	8,161	12–8–1	25	OTL
22	November 28	Ottawa	2 – 3	NY Islanders	SO	DiPietro	9,211	13–8–1	27	W
23	November 29	NY Islanders	2 – 4	NY Rangers		DiPietro	18,200	13–9–1	27	L

December: 7–7–1 (home: 4–4–0; road: 3–3–1)

Game	Date	Visitor	Score	Home	OT	Decision	Attendance	Record	Points	Recap
24	December 1	Atlanta	4 – 0	NY Islanders		Dubielewicz	15,355	13–10–1	27	L
25	December 3	Boston	3 – 1	NY Islanders		DiPietro	11,040	13–11–1	27	L
26	December 5	NY Islanders	3 – 4	Atlanta	SO	DiPietro	14,018	13–11–2	28	OTL
27	December 7	NY Islanders	0 – 3	Florida		DiPietro	14,502	13–12–2	28	L
28	December 8	NY Islanders	3 – 2	Tampa Bay	OT	DiPietro	18,319	14–12–2	30	W
29	December 12	NY Islanders	3 – 5	Buffalo		DiPietro	18,690	14–13–2	30	L
30	December 13	Phoenix	2 – 3	NY Islanders		DiPietro	9,581	15–13–2	32	W
31	December 15	Pittsburgh	3 – 2	NY Islanders		DiPietro	15,269	15–14–2	32	L
32	December 19	Buffalo	2 – 1	NY Islanders		DiPietro	10,806	15–15–2	32	L
33	December 21	NY Islanders	4 – 2	Pittsburgh		DiPietro	17,008	16–15–2	34	W
34	December 22	Washington	2 – 3	NY Islanders	OT	DiPietro	14,305	17–15–2	36	W
35	December 26	Toronto	3 – 4	NY Islanders	OT	Dubielewicz	15,301	18–15–2	38	W
36	December 27	NY Islanders	2 – 5	Ottawa		Dubielewicz	20,268	18–16–2	38	L
37	December 29	New Jersey	2 – 5	NY Islanders		Dubielewicz	16,234	19–16–2	40	W
38	December 31	NY Islanders	4 – 1	Carolina		Dubielewicz	17,091	20–16–2	42	W

January: 4–6–4 (home: 0–4–2; road: 4–2–2)

Game	Date	Visitor	Score	Home	OT	Decision	Attendance	Record	Points	Recap
39	January 3	Florida	4 – 3	NY Islanders	OT	DiPietro	11,428	20–16–3	43	OTL
40	January 5	NY Islanders	1 – 2	Colorado	OT	DiPietro	17,154	20–16–4	44	OTL
41	January 7	NY Islanders	0 – 4	Edmonton		DiPietro	16,839	20–17–4	44	L
42	January 8	NY Islanders	2 – 3	Vancouver	SO	DiPietro	18,630	20–17–5	45	OTL
43	January 11	NY Islanders	5 – 4	Calgary	SO	DiPietro	19,289	21–17–5	47	W
44	January 13	NY Islanders	3 – 1	Ottawa		DiPietro	19,804	22–17–5	49	W
45	January 15	Montreal	3 – 1	NY Islanders		DiPietro	11,439	22–18–5	49	L
46	January 16	NY Islanders	3 – 1	New Jersey		DiPietro	15,975	23–18–5	51	W
47	January 19	Philadelphia	5 – 3	NY Islanders		DiPietro	16,234	23–19–5	51	L
48	January 21	Carolina	3 – 2	NY Islanders	OT	DiPietro	16,234	23–19–6	52	OTL
49	January 22	NY Islanders	6 – 3	Carolina		Dubielewicz	15,675	24–19–6	54	W
50	January 24	NY Islanders	1 – 4	Boston		DiPietro	13,461	24–20–6	54	L
51	January 29	Ottawa	5 – 2	NY Islanders		DiPietro	9,546	24–21–6	54	L
52	January 31	Los Angeles	3 – 1	NY Islanders		Dubielewicz	10,148	24–22–6	54	L

February: 7–5–1 (home: 4–2–0; road: 3–3–1)

Game	Date	Visitor	Score	Home	OT	Decision	Attendance	Record	Points	Recap
53	February 2	NY Islanders	1 – 4	Montreal		DiPietro	21,273	24–23–6	54	L
54	February 5	Anaheim	3 – 0	NY Islanders		DiPietro	9,649	24–24–6	54	L
55	February 7	NY Islanders	3 – 4	Pittsburgh		DiPietro	17,075	24–25–6	54	L
56	February 9	NY Islanders	3 – 4	Minnesota	OT	DiPietro	18,568	24–25–7	55	OTL
57	February 12	Philadelphia	3 – 4	NY Islanders		DiPietro	11,193	25–25–7	57	W
58	February 14	NY Islanders	5 – 4	Toronto		DiPietro	19,227	26–25–7	59	W
59	February 16	Atlanta	1 – 4	NY Islanders		DiPietro	16,234	27–25–7	61	W
60	February 18	San Jose	2 – 3	NY Islanders		DiPietro	16,234	28–25–7	63	W
61	February 20	NY Islanders	3 – 2	Washington	SO	DiPietro	17,584	29–25–7	65	W
62	February 21	Tampa Bay	0 – 1	NY Islanders		DiPietro	12,382	30–25–7	67	W
63	February 23	NY Islanders	2 – 4	New Jersey		DiPietro	17,625	30–26–7	67	L
64	February 26	Pittsburgh	4 – 2	NY Islanders		DiPietro	11,258	30–27–7	67	L
65	February 28	NY Islanders	5 – 4	Atlanta	OT	DiPietro	16,332	31–27–7	69	W

March: 3–10–1 (home: 1–4–1; road: 2–6–0)

Game	Date	Visitor	Score	Home	OT	Decision	Attendance	Record	Points	Recap
66	March 1	Philadelphia	4 – 1	NY Islanders		DiPietro	15,136	31–28–7	69	L
67	March 2	Florida	1 – 0	NY Islanders		Dubielewicz	15,314	31–29–7	69	L
68	March 4	NY Islanders	4 – 3	NY Rangers	SO	Dubielewicz	18,200	32–29–7	71	W
69	March 6	NY Rangers	4 – 1	NY Islanders		Dubielewicz	16,234	32–30–7	71	L
70	March 8	NY Islanders	1 – 4	Philadelphia		Dubielewicz	19,748	32–31–7	71	L
71	March 11	NY Islanders	4 – 8	Tampa Bay		DiPietro	19,111	32–32–7	71	L
72	March 12	NY Islanders	2 – 4	Florida		DiPietro	15,233	32–33–7	71	L
73	March 15	NY Islanders	0 – 3	Montreal		DiPietro	21,273	32–34–7	71	L
74	March 18	Toronto	3 – 1	NY Islanders		Dubielewicz	13,134	32–35–7	71	L
75	March 21	NY Islanders	3 – 1	New Jersey		Dubielewicz	17,075	33–35–7	73	W
76	March 23	NY Islanders	1 – 4	Philadelphia		MacDonald	19,136	33–36–7	73	L
77	March 24	Pittsburgh	1 – 4	NY Islanders		Dubielewicz	16,234	34–36–7	75	W
78	March 27	NY Islanders	1 – 3	Pittsburgh		Dubielewicz	17,025	34–37–7	75	L
79	March 29	Philadelphia	4 – 3	NY Islanders	SO	Dubielewicz	15,223	34–37–8	76	OTL

April: 1–1–1 (home: 0–1–1; road: 1–0–0)

Game	Date	Visitor	Score	Home	OT	Decision	Attendance	Record	Points	Recap
80	April 1	New Jersey	2 – 1	NY Islanders	OT	MacDonald	12,357	34–37–9	77	OTL
81	April 3	NY Rangers	3 – 0	NY Islanders		Dubielewicz	16,234	34–38–9	77	L
82	April 4	NY Islanders	4 – 3	NY Rangers	OT	Dubielewicz	18,200	35–38–9	79	W

Legend: W Win (2 points) L Loss (0 points) OTL Overtime/shootout loss (1 point)

== Playoffs ==
The Islanders had qualified for the playoffs in the previous season, but the 2007–08 season ended with the team missing the playoffs for the first time since the 2005–06 season.

== Player statistics ==
=== Skaters ===
Note: GP = Games played; G = Goals; A = Assists; Pts = Points; PIM = Penalty minutes

	Regular season						Playoffs
Player	GP	G	A	Pts	PIM	GP	G	A	Pts	PIM	+/-
Mike Comrie	76	21	28	49	87	-21
Bill Guerin	81	23	21	44	65	-15
Miroslav Satan	80	16	25	41	39	-11
Trent Hunter	82	12	29	41	43	-17
Josef Vasicek	81	16	19	35	53	+1
Ruslan Fedotenko	67	16	17	33	40	-9
Richard Park	82	12	20	32	20	-4
Mike Sillinger	52	14	12	26	28	-10
Bryan Berard	54	5	17	22	48	-17
Sean Bergenheim	78	10	12	22	62	-3
Chris Campoli	46	4	14	18	16	-1
Andy Hilbert	70	8	8	16	18	+2
Radek Martinek	69	0	15	15	40	-9
Blake Comeau	51	8	7	15	22	+1
Bruno Gervais	60	0	13	13	34	-5
Freddy Meyer	52	3	9	12	22	+6
Andy Sutton	58	1	7	8	86	-6
Brendan Witt	59	2	5	7	51	-8
Kyle Okposo	9	2	3	5	2	+3
Jeff Tambellini	31	1	3	4	8	-9
Tim Jackman	36	1	3	4	57	-3
Chris Simon	28	1	2	3	43	-2
Frans Nielsen	16	2	1	3	0	+1
Rob Davison	19	1	1	2	32	-3
Aaron Johnson	30	0	2	2	30	+2
Drew Fata	5	0	1	1	4	-1
Ben Walter	8	1	0	1	0	-1
Jon Sim	2	0	1	1	2	-1
Matthew Spiller	9	0	1	1	7	-2
Jack Hillen	2	0	1	1	4	+1

=== Goaltenders ===
Note: GP = Games played; TOI = Time on ice (minutes); W = Wins; L = Losses; OT = Overtime/shootout losses; GA = Goals against; SO = Shutouts; Sv% = Save percentage; GAA = Goals against average

	Regular season									Playoffs
Player	GP	TOI	W	L	OT	GA	SO	Sv%	GAA	GP	TOI	W	L	GA	SO	Sv%	GAA
Rick DiPietro	63	3707	26	28	7	174	3	.902	2.82
Wade Dubielewicz	20	1132	9	9	1	51	0	.919	2.70
Joey MacDonald	2	120	0	1	1	6	0	.918	2.99
COMBINED		4959	35	38	9	231	3	.907	2.83

== Awards and records ==
=== Milestones ===
Regular Season
Player	Milestone	Reached
Ruslan Fedotenko	100th NHL Assist	October 6, 2007
Brendan Witt	100th NHL Point	October 13, 2007
Andy Sutton	800th NHL PIM	October 20, 2007
Mike Sillinger	1000th NHL Game	November 1, 2007
Mike Sillinger	300th NHL Assist	November 3, 2007
Mike Comrie	400th NHL Game	November 12, 2007
Rick DiPietro	100th NHL Win	November 19, 2007
Ruslan Fedotenko	300th NHL PIM	November 19, 2007
Josef Vasicek	400th NHL Game	November 26, 2007
Bruno Gervais	100th NHL Game	November 28, 2007
Mike Comrie	300th NHL PIM	November 28, 2007
Andy Hilbert	100th NHL PIM	December 5, 2007
Coach	Milestone	Reached
Al Arbour	1500th NHL Game	November 3, 2007

== Transactions ==
The Islanders were involved in the following transactions during the 2007–08 season.

=== Trades ===
July 5, 2007
To Edmonton Oilers

Allan Rourke
3rd round pick in 2008
To New York Islanders

2nd round pick in 2008
September 11, 2007
To Boston Bruins

Petteri Nokelainen
To New York Islanders

Ben Walter
conditional 2nd round pick in 2009

February 26, 2007

To San Jose Sharks

7th round pick in 2008
To New York Islanders

Rob Davison

=== Free agents ===
Player	Former team	Contract Terms
Jon Sim	Atlanta Thrashers	3 years, $3 million
Ruslan Fedotenko	Tampa Bay Lightning	1 year, $2.9 million
Bill Guerin	San Jose Sharks	2 years, $9 million
Mike Comrie	Ottawa Senators	1 year, $3.375 million
Tim Jackman	Los Angeles Kings	1 year, $500,000
Matthew Spiller	Phoenix Coyotes	1 year, $475,000
Joey MacDonald	Boston Bruins	2 years, $975,000
Darryl Bootland	Detroit Red Wings	1 year, $525,000
Aaron Johnson	Columbus Blue Jackets	1 year, $475,000
Josef Vasicek	Carolina Hurricanes	

Player	New team
Tom Poti	Washington Capitals
Jason Blake	Toronto Maple Leafs
Richard Zedník	Florida Panthers
Viktor Kozlov	Washington Capitals
Ryan Smyth	Colorado Avalanche
Sean Hill	Minnesota Wild
Arron Asham	New Jersey Devils

== Draft picks ==
New York's picks at the 2007 NHL entry draft in Columbus, Ohio.

Round	#	Player	Position	Nationality	College/Junior/Club team (League)
3	62	Mark Katic	Defenceman	Canada	Sarnia Sting (OHL)
3	76	Jason Gregoire	Left wing	Canada	Lincoln Stars (USHL)
4	106	Maxim Gratchev	Left wing	Russia	Rimouski Océanic (QMJHL)
6	166	Blake Kessel	Defenceman	United States	Waterloo Black Hawks (USHL)
7	196	Simon Lacroix	Defenceman	Canada	Shawinigan Cataractes (QMJHL)

== See also ==
- 2007–08 NHL season
