= 2007–08 Tampa Bay Lightning season =

National Hockey League team season

2007–08 Tampa Bay Lightning
- Division: 5th Southeast
- Conference: 15th Eastern
- 2007–08 record: 31–42–9
- Home record: 20–18–3
- Road record: 11–24–6
- Goals for: 223
- Goals against: 267

Team information
- General manager: Jay Feaster
- Coach: John Tortorella
- Captain: Tim Taylor
- Alternate captains: Vincent Lecavalier; Brad Richards (Oct.–Feb.); Martin St. Louis
- Arena: St. Pete Times Forum
- Average attendance: 18,693 (95.9%)

Team leaders
- Goals: Vincent Lecavalier (40)
- Assists: Martin St. Louis (58)
- Points: Vincent Lecavalier (92)
- Penalty minutes: Shane O'Brien (154)
- Plus/minus: Michel Ouellet (+11)
- Wins: Johan Holmqvist (20)
- Goals against average: Johan Holmqvist (3.01)

The 2007–08 Tampa Bay Lightning season began October 4, 2007. It is the Lightning's 16th season in the National Hockey League (NHL).

Tampa Bay's new logo, introduced in 2007.

The Lightning introduced a new logo design prior to the start of the season. The new, "modernized" logo was similar to the team's original logo, with the edges on the lightning bolt, and the text looking "sharper." The wordmark "Lightning" was dropped from the logo. It was the first change to the team's primary logo in its 15-year history and coincided with the launch of the Rbk Edge jersey design, introduced League wide.

The Lighting also announced that the team, along with the St. Pete Times Forum, had been tentatively sold to a group represented by former Columbus coach and general manager Doug MacLean. The deal was terminated in mid-November after the group, called Absolute Hockey Enterprises, began to fight amongst itself, leading to lawsuits being filed. The team, in announcing the cancellation of the sale, expressed in a November 27 release that it hoped the deal could be resurrected.

Forwards Vincent Lecavalier and Martin St. Louis were selected to represent the Lightning, and the Eastern Conference, at the 2008 All-Star Game in Atlanta. For the first time since the 2001–02 season, the Tampa Bay Lightning missed the Stanley Cup playoffs.

== Regular season ==
The Lightning had the fewest power-play opportunities of all 30 teams (296) and, excluding one shootout goal allowed, gave up 266 goals during the regular season, tied with the Atlanta Thrashers for 30th overall.

=== Divisional standings ===
Southeast Division
		GP	W	L	OTL	GF	GA	Pts
**1**	**y – Washington Capitals**	**82**	**43**	**31**	**8**	**242**	**231**	**94**
2	Carolina Hurricanes	82	43	33	6	252	249	92
3	Florida Panthers	82	38	35	9	216	226	85
4	Atlanta Thrashers	82	34	40	8	216	272	76
5	Tampa Bay Lightning	82	31	42	9	223	267	71

=== Conference standings ===
Eastern Conference
R		Div	GP	W	L	OTL	GF	GA	Pts
**1**	**z – Montreal Canadiens**	**NE**	**82**	**47**	**25**	**10**	**262**	**222**	104
**2**	**y – Pittsburgh Penguins**	**AT**	**82**	**47**	**27**	**8**	**247**	**216**	102
**3**	**y – Washington Capitals**	**SE**	**82**	**43**	**31**	**8**	**242**	**231**	94
**4**	**New Jersey Devils**	**AT**	**82**	**46**	**29**	**7**	**206**	**197**	99
**5**	**New York Rangers**	**AT**	**82**	**42**	**27**	**13**	**213**	**199**	97
**6**	**Philadelphia Flyers**	**AT**	**82**	**42**	**29**	**11**	**248**	**233**	95
**7**	**Ottawa Senators**	**NE**	**82**	**43**	**31**	**8**	**261**	**247**	94
**8**	**Boston Bruins**	**NE**	**82**	**41**	**29**	**12**	**212**	**222**	94
8.5
9	Carolina Hurricanes	SE	82	43	33	6	252	249	92
10	Buffalo Sabres	NE	82	39	31	12	255	242	90
11	Florida Panthers	SE	82	38	35	9	216	226	85
12	Toronto Maple Leafs	NE	82	36	35	11	231	260	83
13	New York Islanders	AT	82	35	38	9	194	243	79
14	Atlanta Thrashers	SE	82	34	40	8	216	272	76
15	Tampa Bay Lightning	SE	82	31	42	9	223	267	71

Divisions: AT – Atlantic, NE – Northeast, SE – Southeast

bold – qualified for playoffs, y – division winner, z – placed first in conference (and division)

== Schedule and results ==
2007–08 regular season
October: 5–5–1 (home: 5–0–1; road: 0–5–0)

Game	Date	Visitor	Score	Home	OT	Decision	Attendance	Record	Points	Recap
1	October 4	New Jersey	1 – 3	Tampa Bay		Holmqvist	19,454	1–0–0	2	W
2	October 6	Atlanta	2 – 5	Tampa Bay		Holmqvist	19,220	2–0–0	4	W
3	October 10	Florida	1 – 2	Tampa Bay		Holmqvist	18,540	3–0–0	6	W
4	October 13	Tampa Bay	4 – 6	Florida		Denis	15,801	3–1–0	6	L
5	October 18	Tampa Bay	1 – 4	Boston		Holmqvist	16,363	3–2–0	6	L
6	October 20	Atlanta	2 – 6	Tampa Bay		Holmqvist	19,420	4–2–0	8	W
7	October 24	Tampa Bay	3 – 5	Washington		Denis	10,226	4–3–0	8	L
8	October 25	Philadelphia	2 – 5	Tampa Bay		Holmqvist	18,616	5–3–0	10	W
9	October 27	Buffalo	4 – 3	Tampa Bay	OT	Holmqvist	19,804	5–3–1	11	OTL
10	October 29	Tampa Bay	1 – 3	NY Rangers		Holmqvist	18,200	5–4–1	11	L
11	October 31	Tampa Bay	1 – 6	New Jersey		Holmqvist	13,218	5–5–1	11	L

November: 5–8–1 (home: 3–3–0; road: 2–5–1)

Game	Date	Visitor	Score	Home	OT	Decision	Attendance	Record	Points	Recap
12	November 1	Tampa Bay	0 – 4	NY Islanders		Denis	11,008	5–6–1	11	L
13	November 3	Atlanta	6 – 4	Tampa Bay		Holmqvist	19,155	5–7–1	11	L
14	November 5	Tampa Bay	3 – 4	Florida		Holmqvist	10,149	5–8–1	11	L
15	November 7	Florida	1 – 3	Tampa Bay		Holmqvist	16,526	6–8–1	13	W
16	November 8	Tampa Bay	5 – 1	Carolina		Holmqvist	14,017	7–8–1	15	W
17	November 10	Tampa Bay	5 – 2	Washington		Holmqvist	14,617	8–8–1	17	W
18	November 14	Carolina	1 – 6	Tampa Bay		Holmqvist	17,444	9–8–1	19	W
19	November 16	Washington	2 – 5	Tampa Bay		Holmqvist	19,526	10–8–1	21	W
20	November 19	Tampa Bay	3 – 4	Atlanta	OT	Holmqvist	13,419	10–8–2	22	OTL
21	November 21	NY Rangers	2 – 1	Tampa Bay		Holmqvist	20,110	10–9–2	22	L
22	November 23	Tampa Bay	3 – 4	Carolina		Holmqvist	18,033	10–10–2	22	L
23	November 24	New Jersey	3 – 2	Tampa Bay		Holmqvist	19,077	10–11–2	22	L
24	November 28	Tampa Bay	1 – 5	Chicago		Holmqvist	11,122	10–12–2	22	L
25	November 29	Tampa Bay	2 – 4	Detroit		Denis	17,001	10–13–2	22	L

December: 5–8–1 (home: 4–5–1; road: 1–3–0)

Game	Date	Visitor	Score	Home	OT	Decision	Attendance	Record	Points	Recap
26	December 1	Boston	1 – 4	Tampa Bay		Holmqvist	18,444	11–13–2	24	W
27	December 4	Ottawa	3 – 4	Tampa Bay	SO	Holmqvist	17,540	12–13–2	26	W
28	December 6	Carolina	1 – 2	Tampa Bay		Holmqvist	16,674	13–13–2	28	W
29	December 8	NY Islanders	3 – 2	Tampa Bay	OT	Holmqvist	18,319	13–13–3	29	OTL
30	December 10	Tampa Bay	1 – 6	Toronto		Holmqvist	19,454	13–14–3	29	L
31	December 11	Tampa Bay	3 – 2	Montreal	SO	Denis	21,273	14–14–3	31	W
32	December 13	Calgary	9 – 6	Tampa Bay		Denis	19,026	14–15–3	31	L
33	December 15	Washington	3 – 2	Tampa Bay		Holmqvist	18,367	14–16–3	31	L
34	December 18	Tampa Bay	2 – 6	Atlanta		Holmqvist	14,060	14–17–3	31	L
35	December 20	Toronto	1 – 2	Tampa Bay		Ramo	19,131	15–17–3	33	W
36	December 22	Carolina	4 – 1	Tampa Bay		Ramo	18,765	15–18–3	33	L
37	December 26	Tampa Bay	2 – 3	Washington		Ramo	15,035	15–19–3	33	L
38	December 27	Montreal	5 – 2	Tampa Bay		Holmqvist	20,294	15–20–3	33	L
39	December 29	Philadelphia	4 – 2	Tampa Bay		Ramo	20,124	15–21–3	33	L

January: 6–5–2 (home: 2–4–0; road: 4–1–2)

Game	Date	Visitor	Score	Home	OT	Decision	Attendance	Record	Points	Recap
40	January 1	Tampa Bay	3 – 4	Toronto	SO	Ramo	19,347	15–21–4	34	OTL
41	January 3	Tampa Bay	3 – 6	Montreal		Ramo	21,273	15–22–4	34	L
42	January 5	Tampa Bay	3 – 4	Ottawa	OT	Holmqvist	20,108	15–22–5	35	OTL
43	January 8	Tampa Bay	5 – 3	NY Rangers		Ramo	18,200	16–22–5	37	W
44	January 10	Pittsburgh	4 – 1	Tampa Bay		Ramo	20,426	16–23–5	37	L
45	January 12	Tampa Bay	5 – 3	Florida		Holmqvist	16,578	17–23–5	39	W
46	January 15	Colorado	3 – 0	Tampa Bay		Ramo	17,222	17–24–5	39	L
47	January 18	Tampa Bay	3 – 0	Pittsburgh		Holmqvist	17,132	18–24–5	41	W
48	January 19	Tampa Bay	2 – 0	Ottawa		Holmqvist	20,091	19–24–5	43	W
49	January 22	Edmonton	3 – 4	Tampa Bay		Holmqvist	16,799	20–24–5	45	W
50	January 24	Ottawa	8 – 4	Tampa Bay		Ramo	16,346	20–25–5	45	L
51	January 29	Buffalo	4 – 2	Tampa Bay		Holmqvist	18,920	20–26–5	45	L
52	January 31	Vancouver	3 – 4	Tampa Bay		Ramo	17,019	21–26–5	47	W

February: 5–5–2 (home: 2–4–0; road: 3–1–2)

Game	Date	Visitor	Score	Home	OT	Decision	Attendance	Record	Points	Recap
53	February 2	Florida	3 – 2	Tampa Bay		Ramo	19,977	21–27–5	47	L
54	February 5	Tampa Bay	5 – 4	St. Louis		Holmqvist	17,150	22–27–5	49	W
55	February 7	Tampa Bay	5 – 4	Nashville		Holmqvist	13,959	23–27–5	51	W
56	February 9	Tampa Bay	1 – 2	Atlanta	OT	Holmqvist	18,879	23–27–6	52	OTL
57	February 12	Canadiens	2 – 3	Tampa Bay		Ramo	17,420	24–27–6	54	W
58	February 14	Tampa Bay	5 – 3	Philadelphia		Holmqvist	19,336	25–27–6	56	W
59	February 16	Capitals	3 – 2	Tampa Bay		Holmqvist	20,254	25–28–6	56	L
60	February 20	Tampa Bay	3 – 4	Buffalo	OT	Holmqvist	18,690	25–28–7	57	OTL
61	February 21	Tampa Bay	0 – 1	NY Islanders		Ramo	12,382	25–29–7	57	L
62	February 23	Boston	5 – 3	Tampa Bay		Holmqvist	20,519	25–30–7	57	L
63	February 27	Minnesota	3 – 2	Tampa Bay		Smith	17,211	25–31–7	57	L
64	February 29	Toronto	2 – 3	Tampa Bay	OT	Smith	20,641	26–31–7	59	OTL

March: 5–8–2 (home: 4–2–1; road: 1–6–1)

Game	Date	Visitor	Score	Home	OT	Decision	Attendance	Record	Points	Recap
65	March 1	Tampa Bay	1 – 5	Carolina		Smith	16,831	26–32–7	59	L
66	March 4	Pittsburgh	2 – 0	Tampa Bay		Smith	19,206	26–33–7	59	L
67	March 6	Tampa Bay	2 – 3	Philadelphia		Smith	19,217	26–34–7	59	L
68	March 7	Tampa Bay	1 – 2	New Jersey	OT	Ramo	15,670	26–34–8	60	OTL
69	March 9	Tampa Bay	3 – 5	Columbus		Smith	14,796	26–35–8	60	L
70	March 11	NY Islanders	4 – 8	Tampa Bay		Ramo	19,111	27–35–8	62	W
71	March 13	Tampa Bay	3 – 1	Boston		Smith	13,373	28–35–8	64	W
72	March 15	NY Rangers	0 – 3	Tampa Bay		Smith	20,926	29–35–8	66	W
73	March 19	Tampa Bay	4 – 7	Buffalo		Ramo	18,690	29–36–8	66	L
74	March 20	Tampa Bay	2 – 4	Pittsburgh		Smith	17,044	29–37–8	66	L
75	March 22	Tampa Bay	2 – 4	Florida		Smith	18,502	29–38–8	66	L
76	March 25	Florida	1 – 3	Tampa Bay		Ramo	16,110	30–38–8	68	W
77	March 27	Washington	4 – 3	Tampa Bay	OT	Ramo	17,777	30–38–9	69	OTL
78	March 29	Carolina	1 – 2	Tampa Bay		Ramo	19,311	31–38–9	71	W
79	March 31	Atlanta	2 – 0	Tampa Bay		Smith	17,411	31–39–9	71	L

April: 0–3–0 (home: 0–0–0; road: 0–3–0)

Game	Date	Visitor	Score	Home	OT	Decision	Attendance	Record	Points	Recap
80	April 2	Tampa Bay	2 – 6	Carolina		Smith	17,644	31–40–9	71	L
81	April 3	Tampa Bay	1 – 4	Washington		Ramo	18,277	31–41–9	71	L
82	April 5	Tampa Bay	1 – 4	Atlanta		Smith	18,732	31–42–9	71	L

Legend: W Win (2 points) L Loss (0 points) OTL Overtime/shootout loss (1 point)

== Player statistics ==
=== Skaters ===
Note: GP = Games played; G = Goals; A = Assists; Pts = Points; +/- = Plus/minus; PIM = Penalty minutes

Regular season
Top 10 players	GP	G	A	Pts	+/-	PIM
Vincent Lecavalier	81	40	52	92	-17	89
Martin St. Louis	82	25	58	83	-23	26
Vaclav Prospal (18 Phi)	62	29	28	57	-7	39
Brad Richards (12 Dal)	62	18	33	51	-25	15
Michel Ouellet	64	17	19	36	11	12
Filip Kuba	75	6	25	31	-8	40
Paul Ranger	72	10	21	31	-13	56
Dan Boyle	37	4	21	25	-29	57
Jan Hlavac (18 Nsh)	62	9	13	22	-10	32
Mathieu Darche	73	7	15	22	-14	20

=== Goaltenders ===
Note: GP = Games played; TOI = Time on ice (minutes); W = Wins; L = Losses; OT = Overtime losses;
GA = Goals against; SO = Shutouts; Sv% = Save percentage; GAA = Goals against average

Regular season
Player	GP	TOI	W	L	OT	GA	SO	Sv%	GAA
Johan Holmqvist (2 Dal)	45	2469	20	16	6	124	0	.890	3.01
Karri Ramo	22	1268	7	10	11	64	0	.899	3.03
Mike Smith (21 Dal)	13	773	3	10	1	28	0	.893	2.79
Marc Denis	10	414	1	5	0	28	0	.864	4.05

== Awards and records ==
- King Clancy Memorial Trophy – Vincent Lecavalier
- NHL Foundation Player Award – Vincent Lecavalier

=== Milestones ===
Regular season
Player	Milestone	Reached
Mike Lundin; Matt Smaby	1st NHL game	October 4, 2007
Jan Hlavac	100th NHL PIM	October 6, 2007
Filip Kuba	200th NHL PIM	October 13, 2007
Mike Lundin	1st NHL assist 1st NHL point	October 18, 2007
Brad Richards	500th NHL game	October 29, 2007
Nick Tarnasky	100th NHL game	October 31, 2007

== Transactions ==
The Lightning have been involved in the following transactions during the 2007–08 season.

=== Trades ===
June 13, 2007	To Tampa Bay Lightning Chris Gratton	To Florida Panthers 2nd round pick in either 2007 or 2008 – Jacob Markstrom
July 4, 2007	To Tampa Bay Lightning Bryce Lampman	To New York Rangers Mitch Fritz
November 19, 2007	To Tampa Bay Lightning Mario Scalzo	To Dallas Stars Bryce Lampman
January 15, 2008	To Tampa Bay Lightning Junior Lessard	To Dallas Stars Dan Jancevski
February 26, 2008	To Tampa Bay Lightning Mike Smith; Jussi Jokinen; Jeff Halpern	To Dallas Stars Brad Richards; Johan Holmqvist
February 26, 2008	To Tampa Bay Lightning 7th round pick in 2008 – Joacim Eriksson	To Nashville Predators Jan Hlavac
February 26, 2008	To Tampa Bay Lightning Brandon Segal; Conditional Draft Pick	To Anaheim Ducks Jay Leach

=== Free agents ===
Player	Former team	Contract terms
Michel Ouellet	Pittsburgh Penguins	2 years, $2.5 million
Craig MacDonald	Chicago Blackhawks	1 year, $475,000
Mathieu Darche	San Jose Sharks	1 year, $475,000
Brad Lukowich	New Jersey Devils	3 years, $4.7 million
Jay Leach	Boston Bruins	1 year, $525,000
Dan Jancevski	Montreal Canadiens	1 year, $500,000

Player	New team
Cory Sarich	Calgary Flames
Eric Perrin	Atlanta Thrashers
Ruslan Fedotenko	New York Islanders
Luke Richardson	Ottawa Senators

== Draft picks ==
Tampa's picks at the 2007 NHL entry draft in Columbus, Ohio. The Lightning do not have a first round pick, having dealt the 16th overall selection to the Anaheim Ducks.

Round	#	Player	Position	Nationality	College/junior/club team (league)
2	47	Dana Tyrell	C/RW	Canada	Prince George Cougars (WHL)
3	75	Luca Cunti	C/LW	Switzerland	Dubendorf (Switzerland)
3	77	Alexander Killorn	C	Canada	Deerfield Academy (USHS-MA)
4	107	Mitch Fadden	C	Canada	Lethbridge Hurricanes (WHL)
5	150	Matt Marshall	C/RW	United States	Noble and Greenough School (USHS–MA)
6	167	Johan Harju	LW	Sweden	Luleå HF (Elitserien)
7	183	Torrie Jung	G	Canada	Kelowna Rockets (WHL)
7	197	Michael Ward	D	Canada	Lewiston Maineiacs (QMJHL)
7	210	Justin Courtnall	LW	Canada	Burnaby Express (BCHL)

== Farm teams ==
=== American Hockey League ===
Norfolk Admirals

=== ECHL ===
Mississippi Sea Wolves

== See also ==
- 2007–08 NHL season
