= 2007–08 Florida Panthers season =

National Hockey League team season

2007–08 Florida Panthers
- Division: 3rd Southeast
- Conference: 11th Eastern
- 2007–08 record: 38–35–9
- Home record: 18–15–8
- Road record: 20–20–1
- Goals for: 216
- Goals against: 226

Team information
- General manager: Jacques Martin
- Coach: Jacques Martin
- Captain: Olli Jokinen
- Alternate captains: Bryan Allen; Stephen Weiss
- Arena: BankAtlantic Center
- Average attendance: 15,436 (80.2%)

Team leaders
- Goals: Olli Jokinen (34)
- Assists: Olli Jokinen (37)
- Points: Olli Jokinen (71)
- Penalty minutes: Nathan Horton (85)
- Plus/minus: Jassen Cullimore (+21)
- Wins: Tomas Vokoun (30)
- Goals against average: Tomas Vokoun (2.68)

The 2007–08 Florida Panthers season began on October 4, 2007, with a game at Madison Square Garden against the New York Rangers. It was the Panthers' 14th season in the National Hockey League (NHL). The Panthers failed to qualify for the playoffs for the seventh consecutive season for the first time in franchise history.

The 2007 NHL entry draft took place in Columbus, Ohio, on June 22–23. For a complete list of Panthers' draft picks, see below.

== Regular season ==
The Panthers tied the Montreal Canadiens for the fewest shorthanded goals allowed with just three.

=== Divisional standings ===
Southeast Division
		GP	W	L	OTL	GF	GA	Pts
**1**	**y – Washington Capitals**	**82**	**43**	**31**	**8**	**242**	**231**	**94**
2	Carolina Hurricanes	82	43	33	6	252	249	92
3	Florida Panthers	82	38	35	9	216	226	85
4	Atlanta Thrashers	82	34	40	8	216	272	76
5	Tampa Bay Lightning	82	31	42	9	223	267	71

=== Conference standings ===
Eastern Conference
R		Div	GP	W	L	OTL	GF	GA	Pts
**1**	**z – Montreal Canadiens**	**NE**	**82**	**47**	**25**	**10**	**262**	**222**	104
**2**	**y – Pittsburgh Penguins**	**AT**	**82**	**47**	**27**	**8**	**247**	**216**	102
**3**	**y – Washington Capitals**	**SE**	**82**	**43**	**31**	**8**	**242**	**231**	94
**4**	**New Jersey Devils**	**AT**	**82**	**46**	**29**	**7**	**206**	**197**	99
**5**	**New York Rangers**	**AT**	**82**	**42**	**27**	**13**	**213**	**199**	97
**6**	**Philadelphia Flyers**	**AT**	**82**	**42**	**29**	**11**	**248**	**233**	95
**7**	**Ottawa Senators**	**NE**	**82**	**43**	**31**	**8**	**261**	**247**	94
**8**	**Boston Bruins**	**NE**	**82**	**41**	**29**	**12**	**212**	**222**	94
8.5
9	Carolina Hurricanes	SE	82	43	33	6	252	249	92
10	Buffalo Sabres	NE	82	39	31	12	255	242	90
11	Florida Panthers	SE	82	38	35	9	216	226	85
12	Toronto Maple Leafs	NE	82	36	35	11	231	260	83
13	New York Islanders	AT	82	35	38	9	194	243	79
14	Atlanta Thrashers	SE	82	34	40	8	216	272	76
15	Tampa Bay Lightning	SE	82	31	42	9	223	267	71

Divisions: AT – Atlantic, NE – Northeast, SE – Southeast

bold – qualified for playoffs, y – division winner, z – placed first in conference (and division)

== Schedule and results ==
2007–08 regular season
October: 5–7–0 (home: 4–2–0; road: 1–5–0)

Game	Date	Visitor	Score	Home	OT	Decision	Attendance	Record	Points	Recap
1	October 4	Florida	2 – 5	NY Rangers		Vokoun	18,200	0–1–0	0	L
2	October 6	New Jersey	4 – 1	Florida		Vokoun	19,250	0–2–0	0	L
3	October 10	Florida	1 – 2	Tampa Bay		Anderson	18,540	0–3–0	0	L
4	October 11	New Jersey	0 – 3	Florida		Vokoun	10,847	1–3–0	2	W
5	October 13	Tampa Bay	4 – 6	Florida		Vokoun	15,801	2–3–0	4	W
6	October 16	Florida	2 – 1	Montreal	SO	Vokoun	21,273	3–3–0	6	W
7	October 18	Florida	2 – 3	Toronto		Anderson	19,349	3–4–0	6	L
8	October 20	Florida	1 – 4	Ottawa		Vokoun	19,904	3–5–0	6	L
9	October 24	Philadelphia	3 – 4	Florida		Vokoun	12,856	4–5–0	8	W
10	October 26	Buffalo	4 – 2	Florida		Vokoun	15,842	4–6–0	8	L
11	October 27	Florida	3 – 4	Nashville		Vokoun	15,767	4–7–0	8	L
12	October 31	Carolina	2 – 4	Florida		Vokoun	10,063	5–7–0	10	W

November: 7–6–1 (home: 3–3–0; road: 4–3–1)

Game	Date	Visitor	Score	Home	OT	Decision	Attendance	Record	Points	Recap
13	November 2	Florida	4 – 2	Buffalo		Vokoun	18,690	6–7–0	12	W
14	November 3	Florida	2 – 4	Carolina		Vokoun	17,547	6–8–0	12	L
15	November 5	Tampa Bay	3 – 4	Florida		Vokoun	10,149	7–8–0	14	W
16	November 7	Florida	1 – 3	Tampa Bay		Vokoun	16,526	7–9–0	14	L
17	November 9	Atlanta	4 – 1	Florida		Vokoun	14,268	7–10–0	14	L
18	November 12	Carolina	4 – 3	Florida		Vokoun	12,715	7–11–0	14	L
19	November 13	Florida	2 – 3	Atlanta	OT	Anderson	12,599	7–11–1	15	OTL
20	November 15	Washington	1 – 2	Florida		Vokoun	12,101	8–11–1	17	W
21	November 17	Florida	1 – 2	Carolina		Vokoun	16,962	8–12–1	17	L
22	November 19	Florida	4 – 3	Washington		Vokoun	13,411	9–12–1	19	W
23	November 21	Florida	5 – 2	Columbus		Vokoun	13,326	10–12–1	21	W
24	November 23	NY Rangers	2 – 3	Florida	SO	Vokoun	19,250	11–12–1	23	W
25	November 28	Florida	2 – 1	Washington	SO	Vokoun	10,526	12–12–1	25	W
26	November 29	Boston	4 – 3	Florida		Anderson	14,926	12–13–1	25	L

December: 6–5–2 (home: 2–4–2; road: 4–1–0)

Game	Date	Visitor	Score	Home	OT	Decision	Attendance	Record	Points	Recap
27	December 1	Washington	2 – 1	Florida		Vokoun	14,333	12–14–1	25	L
28	December 5	Ottawa	5 – 4	Florida		Anderson	11,289	12–15–1	25	L
29	December 7	NY Islanders	0 – 3	Florida		Vokoun	14,502	13–15–1	27	W
30	December 11	Calgary	2 – 1	Florida	SO	Vokoun	12,499	13–15–2	28	OTL
31	December 13	Florida	1 – 0	St. Louis		Vokoun	14,088	14–15–2	30	W
32	December 15	Florida	2 – 5	Detroit		Vokoun	20,066	14–16–2	30	L
33	December 16	Florida	3 – 1	Chicago		Vokoun	12,926	15–16–2	32	W
34	December 18	Florida	3 – 2	Montreal		Vokoun	21,273	16–16–2	34	W
35	December 20	Carolina	4 – 5	Florida		Vokoun	15,061	17–16–2	36	W
36	December 22	Toronto	2 – 1	Florida	OT	Vokoun	18,500	17–16–3	37	OTL
37	December 27	Florida	5 – 3	Atlanta		Vokoun	16,080	18–16–3	39	W
38	December 28	Montreal	5 – 1	Florida		Vokoun	19,838	18–17–3	39	L
39	December 30	Philadelphia	1 – 0	Florida		Vokoun	18,767	18–18–3	39	L

January: 4–7–2 (home: 1–3–2; road: 3–4–0)

Game	Date	Visitor	Score	Home	OT	Decision	Attendance	Record	Points	Recap
40	January 2	Florida	2 – 3	New Jersey		Vokoun	14,124	18–19–3	39	L
41	January 3	Florida	4 – 3	NY Islanders	OT	Anderson	11,428	19–19–3	41	W
42	January 5	Florida	0 – 3	Pittsburgh		Vokoun	17,090	19–20–3	41	L
43	January 8	Pittsburgh	3 – 1	Florida		Vokoun	17,086	19–21–3	41	L
44	January 10	Florida	3 – 2	Atlanta	SO	Vokoun	14,805	20–21–3	43	W
45	January 12	Tampa Bay	5 – 3	Florida		Vokoun	16,578	20–22–3	43	L
46	January 13	Colorado	4 – 3	Florida	SO	Vokoun	13,854	20–22–4	44	OTL
47	January 16	Florida	3 – 5	Philadelphia		Vokoun	19,207	20–23–4	44	L
48	January 18	Florida	2 – 1	New Jersey		Anderson	15,203	21–23–4	46	W
49	January 19	Florida	3 – 5	Washington		Vokoun	16,973	21–24–4	46	L
50	January 22	Ottawa	3 – 5	Florida		Vokoun	12,794	22–24–4	48	W
51	January 24	Edmonton	4 – 3	Florida	SO	Vokoun	12,322	22–24–5	49	OTL
52	January 30	Buffalo	1 – 0	Florida		Vokoun	14,024	22–25–5	49	L

February: 6–6–3 (home: 2–1–3; road: 4–5–0)

Game	Date	Visitor	Score	Home	OT	Decision	Attendance	Record	Points	Recap
53	February 1	Vancouver	3 – 4	Florida	SO	Vokoun	17,523	23–25–5	51	W
54	February 2	Florida	3 – 2	Tampa Bay		Vokoun	19,977	24–25–5	53	W
55	February 5	Florida	8 – 0	Toronto		Vokoun	19,430	25–25–5	55	W
56	February 7	Florida	4 – 5	Ottawa		Vokoun	19,435	25–26–5	55	L
57	February 9	Florida	6 – 3	Boston		Vokoun	19,893	26–26–5	57	W
58	February 10	Florida	3 – 5	Buffalo		Anderson	18,690	26–27–5	57	L
59	February 13	Montreal	2 – 1	Florida	OT	Vokoun	17,100	26–27–6	58	OTL
60	February 15	Washington	2 – 4	Florida		Vokoun	16,202	27–27–6	60	W
61	February 16	Florida	4 – 5	Carolina		Vokoun	17,737	27–28–6	60	L
62	February 19	Florida	2 – 2	Pittsburgh		Vokoun	17,075	27–29–6	60	L
63	February 21	Boston	5 – 4	Florida	SO	Vokoun	14,992	27–29–7	61	OTL
64	February 23	Florida	2 – 1	Philadelphia	OT	Anderson	19,629	28–29–7	63	W
65	February 24	Florida	0 – 5	NY Rangers		Anderson	17,645	28–30–7	63	L
66	February 27	Toronto	4 – 3	Florida	SO	Vokoun	14,457	28–30–8	64	OTL
67	February 29	Minnesota	3 – 2	Florida		Vokoun	17,897	28–31–8	64	L

March: 8–3–1 (home: 6–2–1; road: 2–1–0)

Game	Date	Visitor	Score	Home	OT	Decision	Attendance	Record	Points	Recap
68	March 2	Florida	1 – 0	NY Islanders		Anderson	15,314	29–31–8	66	W
69	March 4	Florida	1 – 0	Boston	OT	Anderson	16,478	30–31–8	68	W
70	March 6	Pittsburgh	2 – 5	Florida		Anderson	17,012	31–31–8	70	W
71	March 8	Atlanta	2 – 3	Florida	OT	Vokoun	16,614	32–31–8	72	W
72	March 12	NY Islanders	2 – 4	Florida		Vokoun	15,233	33–31–8	74	W
73	March 14	NY Rangers	2 – 3	Florida		Vokoun	19,321	34–31–8	76	W
74	March 16	Atlanta	1 – 3	Florida		Vokoun	15,704	35–31–8	78	W
75	March 20	Carolina	2 – 1	Florida	SO	Vokoun	18,546	35–31–9	79	OTL
76	March 22	Tampa Bay	2 – 4	Florida		Vokoun	18,502	36–31–9	81	W
77	March 25	Florida	1 – 3	Tampa Bay		Vokoun	16,110	36–32–9	81	L
78	March 27	Atlanta	3 – 2	Florida		Vokoun	17,301	36–33–9	81	L
79	March 29	Washington	3 – 2	Florida		Vokoun	17,832	36–34–9	81	L

April: 2–1–0 (home: 0–0–0; road: 2–1–0)

Game	Date	Visitor	Score	Home	OT	Decision	Attendance	Record	Points	Recap
80	April 1	Florida	3 – 2	Atlanta		Anderson	15,453	37–34–9	83	W
81	April 4	Florida	4 – 3	Carolina		Anderson	18,680	38–34–9	85	W
82	April 5	Florida	1 – 3	Washington		Anderson	18,277	38–35–9	85	L

Legend: W Win (2 points) L Loss (0 points) OTL Overtime/shootout loss (1 point)

== Player statistics ==
=== Skaters ===
	Regular season
Player	GP	G	A	Pts	PIM
Olli Jokinen	82	34	37	71	67
Nathan Horton	82	27	35	62	85
Stephen Weiss	74	13	29	42	40
David Booth	73	22	18	40	40
Jay Bouwmeester	82	15	22	37	72
Richard Zednik	54	15	11	26	43
Rostislav Olesz	56	14	12	26	16
Kamil Kreps	76	8	17	25	29
Steve Montador	73	8	15	23	73
Jozef Stumpel	52	7	13	20	10

=== Goaltenders ===
	Regular season
Player	GP	Min	W	L	OT	GA	SO	SV%	GAA
Tomas Vokoun	69	4031	30	29	8	180	4	.919	2.63
Craig Anderson	17	935	8	6	1	35	2	.935	2.25

Note:

Pos = Position;GP = Games played; G = Goals; A = Assists; Pts = Points; PIM = Penalty minutes; +/- = Plus/minus; PPG = Power-play goals; SHG = Short-handed goals; GWG = Game-winning goals
Pos = Position;GP = Games played; Min, TOI = Minutes played; W = Wins; L = Losses; T,T/OT = Ties; OTL = Overtime losses; GA = Goals-against; GAA = Goals-against average; SO = Shutouts; SA = Shots against; SV = Shots saved;SV% = Save percentage;

== Awards and records ==
=== Records ===
- On October 24, Olli Jokinen scored two goals against the Philadelphia Flyers to surpass Scott Mellanby on the franchise's all-time goal-scoring (158) and points (355) lists.

=== Milestones ===
Regular Season
Player	Milestone	Reached
Cory Murphy	1st NHL Game	October 4, 2007
Cory Murphy	1st NHL Goal; 1st NHL Point	October 6, 2007
Bryan Allen	300th NHL Game	October 6, 2007
Cory Murphy	1st NHL Assist	October 11, 2007
Stefan Meyer	1st NHL Game	October 24, 2007
Ville Peltonen	100th NHL Point	October 26, 2007
Olli Jokinen	400th NHL Point	October 27, 2007
Radek Dvorak	300th NHL PIM	November 2, 2007
Tanner Glass	1st NHL Game	November 12, 2007

== Transactions ==
The Panthers have been involved in the following transactions during the 2007–08 season.

=== Trades ===
June 13, 2007	To Florida Panthers 2nd-round pick in either 2007 or 2008 – Jacob Markstrom	To Tampa Bay Lightning Chris Gratton
June 22, 2007	To Florida Panthers Tomas Vokoun	To Nashville Predators 1st-round pick in 2008 – Josh Bailey; 2nd-round pick in 2007 – Nick Spaling conditional 2nd-round pick – Aaron Ness
February 26, 2008	To Florida Panthers Wade Belak	To Toronto Maple Leafs 5th-round pick in 2008 – Jerome Flaake
February 26, 2008	To Florida Panthers Karlis Skrastins; 3rd-round pick in 2008 – Adam Comrie	To Colorado Avalanche Ruslan Salei
February 26, 2008	To Florida Panthers Chad Kilger	To Toronto Maple Leafs 3rd-round pick in 2008 – James Livingston

=== Free agents ===
Player	Former team	Contract Terms
Richard Zednik	New York Islanders	2 years, $3.25 million
Brett McLean	Colorado Avalanche	3 years, $5.1 million
Radek Dvorak	St. Louis Blues	2 years, $3.1 million

Player	New team
Martin Gelinas	Nashville Predators
Alexei Semenov	San Jose Sharks
Alex Auld	Phoenix Coyotes

== Draft picks ==
Florida's picks at the 2007 NHL entry draft in Columbus, Ohio. The Panthers had the 10th overall pick.

Round	#	Player	Nationality	College/Junior/Club team (League)
1	10	Keaton Ellerby (D)	Canada	Kamloops Blazers (WHL)
2	40	Michal Repik (RW)	Czech Republic	Vancouver Giants (WHL)
3	71	Evgeny Dadonov (RW)	Russia	Traktor Chelyabinsk (RSL)
4	101	Matt Rust (C)	United States	U.S. National Team Development Program (NAHL)
5	131	John Lee (D)	United States	Moorhead High School (USHS-MN)
6	181	Corey Syvret (D)	Canada	Guelph Storm (OHL)
7	191	Ryan Wilson (LW)	Canada	Cambridge Winterhawks (MWJHL)
7	202	Sergei Gaiduchenko (G)	Ukraine	Lokomotiv Yaroslavl (RSL)

== Farm teams ==
=== American Hockey League ===
Florida has an affiliation agreement with the Rochester Americans for this season.

=== ECHL ===
The Florida Everblades remained the Panthers' ECHL affiliate that season.
