= 2007–08 Carolina Hurricanes season =

National Hockey League team season

2007–08 Carolina Hurricanes
- Division: 2nd Southeast
- Conference: 9th Eastern
- 2007–08 record: 43–33–6
- Home record: 24–13–4
- Road record: 19–20–2
- Goals for: 252
- Goals against: 249

Team information
- General manager: Jim Rutherford
- Coach: Peter Laviolette
- Captain: Rod Brind'Amour
- Alternate captains: Eric Staal; Cory Stillman (Oct.–Feb.); Glen Wesley; Ray Whitney
- Arena: RBC Center
- Average attendance: 16,633 (89%)

Team leaders
- Goals: Eric Staal (38)
- Assists: Eric Staal (44)
- Points: Eric Staal (82)
- Penalty minutes: Scott Walker (115)
- Plus/minus: Bret Hedican (+17)
- Wins: Cam Ward (37)
- Goals against average: Cam Ward (2.75)

The 2007–08 Carolina Hurricanes season began October 3, 2007. It was the franchise's 36th season, 29th season in the National Hockey League (NHL) and 10th as the Hurricanes. The Hurricanes missed the playoffs for the second consecutive year. They are the first team to miss the playoffs twice in a row after winning the Stanley Cup since the 1922 Toronto St. Patricks.

Key dates prior to the start of the season:

- The 2007 NHL entry draft took place in Columbus, Ohio, on June 22–23.
- The free agency period began on July 1.

== Regular season ==
The Hurricanes had the most power-play opportunities of all 30 NHL teams, with 420.

=== Divisional standings ===
Southeast Division
		GP	W	L	OTL	GF	GA	Pts
**1**	**y – Washington Capitals**	**82**	**43**	**31**	**8**	**242**	**231**	**94**
2	Carolina Hurricanes	82	43	33	6	252	249	92
3	Florida Panthers	82	38	35	9	216	226	85
4	Atlanta Thrashers	82	34	40	8	216	272	76
5	Tampa Bay Lightning	82	31	42	9	223	267	71

=== Conference standings ===
Eastern Conference
R		Div	GP	W	L	OTL	GF	GA	Pts
**1**	**z – Montreal Canadiens**	**NE**	**82**	**47**	**25**	**10**	**262**	**222**	104
**2**	**y – Pittsburgh Penguins**	**AT**	**82**	**47**	**27**	**8**	**247**	**216**	102
**3**	**y – Washington Capitals**	**SE**	**82**	**43**	**31**	**8**	**242**	**231**	94
**4**	**New Jersey Devils**	**AT**	**82**	**46**	**29**	**7**	**206**	**197**	99
**5**	**New York Rangers**	**AT**	**82**	**42**	**27**	**13**	**213**	**199**	97
**6**	**Philadelphia Flyers**	**AT**	**82**	**42**	**29**	**11**	**248**	**233**	95
**7**	**Ottawa Senators**	**NE**	**82**	**43**	**31**	**8**	**261**	**247**	94
**8**	**Boston Bruins**	**NE**	**82**	**41**	**29**	**12**	**212**	**222**	94
8.5
9	Carolina Hurricanes	SE	82	43	33	6	252	249	92
10	Buffalo Sabres	NE	82	39	31	12	255	242	90
11	Florida Panthers	SE	82	38	35	9	216	226	85
12	Toronto Maple Leafs	NE	82	36	35	11	231	260	83
13	New York Islanders	AT	82	35	38	9	194	243	79
14	Atlanta Thrashers	SE	82	34	40	8	216	272	76
15	Tampa Bay Lightning	SE	82	31	42	9	223	267	71

Divisions: AT – Atlantic, NE – Northeast, SE – Southeast

bold – qualified for playoffs, y – division winner, z – placed first in conference (and division)

== Schedule and results ==
2007–08 regular season
October: 7–3–3 (home: 3–1–1; road: 4–2–2)

Game	Date	Visitor	Score	Home	OT	Decision	Attendance	Record	Points	Recap
1	October 3	Montreal	3 – 2	Carolina	OT	Ward	18,680	0–0–1	1	OTL
2	October 5	Pittsburgh	1 – 4	Carolina		Ward	17,816	1–0–1	3	W
3	October 6	Carolina	0 – 2	Washington		Grahame	16,741	1–1–1	3	L
4	October 9	Carolina	7 – 1	Toronto		Ward	19,224	2–1–1	5	W
5	October 11	Carolina	5 – 3	Ottawa		Ward	18,268	3–1–1	7	W
6	October 13	Carolina	3 – 1	Montreal		Ward	21,273	4–1–1	9	W
7	October 19	Carolina	3 – 4	Pittsburgh	SO	Ward	17,132	4–1–2	10	OTL
8	October 20	Carolina	2 – 3	Philadelphia	OT	Grahame	19,615	4–1–3	11	OTL
9	October 22	Vancouver	1 – 3	Carolina		Ward	15,532	5–1–3	13	W
10	October 24	Buffalo	2 – 6	Carolina		Ward	16,058	6–1–3	15	W
11	October 26	Montreal	7 – 4	Carolina		Ward	16,796	6–2–3	15	L
12	October 27	Carolina	8 – 3	NY Islanders		Grahame	13,136	7–2–3	17	W
13	October 31	Carolina	2 – 4	Florida		Ward	10,063	7–3–3	17	L

November: 7–6–0 (home: 5–4–0; road: 2–2–0)

Game	Date	Visitor	Score	Home	OT	Decision	Attendance	Record	Points	Recap
14	November 3	Florida	2 – 4	Carolina		Grahame	17,547	8–3–3	19	W
15	November 5	Washington	0 – 5	Carolina		Ward	12,171	9–3–3	21	W
16	November 8	Tampa Bay	5 – 1	Carolina		Ward	14,017	9–4–3	21	L
17	November 10	Carolina	5 – 3	Atlanta		Ward	18,545	10–4–3	23	W
18	November 12	Carolina	4 – 3	Florida		Ward	12,715	11–4–3	25	W
19	November 14	Carolina	1 – 6	Tampa Bay		Grahame	17,444	11–5–3	25	L
20	November 16	Atlanta	3 – 0	Carolina		Ward	14,632	11–6–3	25	L
21	November 17	Florida	1 – 2	Carolina		Ward	16,962	12–6–3	27	W
22	November 21	Philadelphia	6 – 3	Carolina		Ward	16,351	12–7–3	27	L
23	November 23	Tampa Bay	3 – 4	Carolina		Ward	18,033	13–7–3	29	W
24	November 24	Carolina	2 – 5	Washington		Grahame	13,650	13–8–3	29	L
25	November 28	Philadelphia	3 – 1	Carolina		Ward	15,108	13–9–3	29	L
26	November 30	Washington	3 – 4	Carolina		Ward	16,386	14–9–3	31	W

December: 5–10–0 (home: 2–3–0; road: 3–7–0)

Game	Date	Visitor	Score	Home	OT	Decision	Attendance	Record	Points	Recap
27	December 1	Carolina	1 – 8	Buffalo		Grahame	18,690	14–10–3	31	L
28	December 3	Carolina	4 – 0	NY Rangers		Ward	18,200	15–10–3	33	W
29	December 6	Carolina	1 – 2	Tampa Bay		Ward	16,674	15–11–3	33	L
30	December 8	Carolina	5 – 1	Montreal		Ward	21,273	16–11–3	35	W
31	December 9	Carolina	2 – 5	Detroit		Ward	19,609	16–12–3	35	L
32	December 12	Ottawa	6 – 0	Carolina		Ward	15,268	16–13–3	35	L
33	December 14	Calgary	4 – 3	Carolina		Ward	15,536	16–14–3	35	L
34	December 15	Carolina	6 – 5	Philadelphia	SO	Grahame	19,460	17–14–3	37	W
35	December 18	Toronto	2 – 3	Carolina	OT	Grahame	17,045	18–14–3	39	W
36	December 20	Carolina	4 – 5	Florida		Grahame	15,061	18–15–3	39	L
37	December 22	Carolina	4 – 1	Tampa Bay		Ward	18,765	19–15–3	41	L
38	December 26	Carolina	2 – 4	NY Rangers		Ward	18,200	19–16–3	41	L
39	December 28	Boston	3 – 4	Carolina		Ward	18,680	20–16–3	43	W
40	December 29	Carolina	1 – 4	Columbus		Ward	17,453	20–17–3	43	L
41	December 31	NY Islanders	4 – 1	Carolina		Grahame	17,091	20–18–3	43	L

January: 6–6–1 (home: 3–3–1; road: 3–3–0)

Game	Date	Visitor	Score	Home	OT	Decision	Attendance	Record	Points	Recap
42	January 2	Atlanta	5 – 4	Carolina	OT	Ward	13,506	20–18–4	44	OTL
43	January 4	Carolina	4 – 3	Atlanta		Leighton	16,097	21–18–4	46	W
44	January 5	Carolina	0 – 1	St. Louis		Leighton	19,150	21–19–4	46	L
45	January 8	Carolina	1 – 0	Boston		Ward	14,549	22–19–4	48	W
46	January 10	New Jersey	4 – 1	Carolina		Ward	17,173	22–20–4	48	L
47	January 12	Colorado	5 – 4	Carolina		Ward	18,680	22–21–4	48	L
48	January 15	Carolina	4 – 5	Toronto		Ward	19,444	22–22–4	48	L
49	January 17	Carolina	1 – 5	Ottawa		Ward	19,720	22–23–4	48	L
50	January 18	Edmonton	2 – 7	Carolina		Ward	16,868	23–23–4	50	W
51	January 21	Carolina	3 – 2	NY Islanders	OT	Ward	16,234	24–23–4	52	W
52	January 22	NY Islanders	6 – 3	Carolina		Ward	15,675	24–24–4	52	L
53	January 29	NY Rangers	1 – 3	Carolina		Ward	17,793	25–24–4	54	W
54	January 31	Toronto	2 – 3	Carolina	OT	Ward	15,159	26–24–4	56	W

February: 7–5–1 (home: 5–1–1; road: 2–4–0)

Game	Date	Visitor	Score	Home	OT	Decision	Attendance	Record	Points	Recap
55	February 2	Carolina	1 – 4	Pittsburgh		Ward	17,058	26–25–4	56	L
56	February 5	Carolina	0 – 1	Nashville		Ward	13,949	26–26–4	56	L
57	February 8	Carolina	2 – 1	Washington		Ward	18,204	27–26–4	58	W
58	February 9	Carolina	1 – 6	New Jersey		Ward	16,257	27–27–4	58	L
59	February 12	Carolina	3 – 2	Boston		Ward	15,300	28–27–4	60	W
60	February 14	Pittsburgh	2 – 4	Carolina		Ward	14,922	29–27–4	62	W
61	February 16	Florida	5 – 4	Carolina		Ward	17,737	30–27–4	64	W
62	February 18	Carolina	1 – 5	New Jersey		Grahame	16,182	30–28–4	64	L
63	February 19	Boston	3 – 2	Carolina	SO	Ward	17,552	30–28–5	65	OTL
64	February 21	Atlanta	3 – 5	Carolina		Ward	13,548	31–28–5	67	W
65	February 23	Washington	3 – 6	Carolina		Ward	18,680	32–28–5	69	W
66	February 26	New Jersey	1 – 2	Carolina	OT	Ward	15,466	33–28–5	71	W
67	February 28	NY Rangers	4 – 2	Carolina		Ward	16,041	33–29–5	71	L

March: 9–2–1 (home: 5–0–1; road: 4–2–0)

Game	Date	Visitor	Score	Home	OT	Decision	Attendance	Record	Points	Recap
68	March 1	Tampa Bay	1 – 5	Carolina		Ward	16,831	34–29–5	73	W
69	March 5	Carolina	6 – 3	Atlanta		Ward	13,032	35–29–5	75	W
70	March 6	Minnesota	2 – 3	Carolina		Ward	16,297	36–29–5	77	W
71	March 8	Buffalo	3 – 4	Carolina		Ward	18,808	37–29–5	79	W
72	March 12	Carolina	3 – 0	Chicago		Ward	18,210	38–29–5	81	W
73	March 14	Carolina	1 – 7	Buffalo		Ward	18,690	38–30–5	81	L
74	March 16	Ottawa	1 – 5	Carolina		Ward	18,680	39–30–5	83	W
75	March 19	Carolina	5 – 3	Atlanta		Ward	13,251	40–30–5	85	W
76	March 20	Carolina	2 – 1	Florida	SO	Ward	18,546	41–30–5	87	W
77	March 25	Washington	3 – 2	Carolina	SO	Ward	18,680	41–30–6	88	OTL
78	March 28	Atlanta	1 – 7	Carolina		Ward	17,833	42–30–6	90	W
79	March 29	Carolina	1 – 2	Tampa Bay		Ward	19,311	42-31-6	90	L

April: 1–2–0 (home: 1–1–0; road: 0–1–0)

Game	Date	Visitor	Score	Home	OT	Decision	Attendance	Record	Points	Recap
80	April 1	Carolina	1 – 4	Washington		Ward	18,277	42-32-6	90	L
81	April 2	Tampa Bay	2 – 6	Carolina		Ward	17,644	43-32-6	92	W
82	April 4	Florida	4 – 3	Carolina		Ward	18,680	43-33-6	92	L

Legend: W Win (2 points) L Loss (0 points) OTL Overtime/shootout loss (1 point)

== Player statistics ==
=== Skaters ===
Note: GP = Games played; G = Goals; A = Assists; Pts = Points; +/- = Plus/minus; PIM = Penalty minutes

Regular season
Top 10 Players	GP	G	A	Pts	+/-	PIM
Eric Staal	82	38	44	82	-2	50
Ray Whitney	66	25	36	61	-6	30
Rod Brind'Amour	59	19	32	51	0	38
Erik Cole	73	22	29	51	5	76
Matt Cullen	59	13	36	49	2	32
Joe Corvo	74	13	35	48	17	26
Sergei Samsonov	61	14	22	36	-1	16
Scott Walker	58	14	18	32	-3	115
Tuomo Ruutu	77	10	22	32	4	91
Justin Williams	37	9	21	30	2	43

=== Goaltenders ===
Note: GP = Games played; MIN = Time on ice (minutes); GAA = Goals against average; W = Wins; L = Losses; OT = Overtime losses; SO = Shutouts; SA = Saves; GA = Goals allowed; SV%= Save percentage

Regular season
Player	GP	MIN	GAA	W	L	OT	SO	SA	GA	SV%
Cam Ward	69	3930	2.75	37	25	5	4	1870	180	.904
John Grahame	17	848	3.75	5	7	1	0	424	53	.875
Michael Leighton	3	158	2.66	1	1	0	0	68	7	.897

== Awards and records ==
=== Milestones ===
Regular Season
Player	Milestone	Reached
Bret Hedican	800th NHL PIM	October 26, 2007
Rod Brind'Amour	1000th NHL PIM	October 27, 2007
Craig Adams	400th NHL Game	October 31, 2007
Glen Wesley	1000th NHL PIM	October 31, 2007

== Transactions ==
The Hurricanes have been involved in the following transactions during the 2007–08 season.

Trades
Date	Hurricanes Receive	From	For
June 23, 2007	Michael Leighton	Montreal Canadiens	192nd Overall Pick in 2007
July 17, 2007	Matt Cullen	New York Rangers	Andrew Hutchinson; Joe Barnes; 3rd Round Pick in 2008
January 17, 2008	Future Considerations	Chicago Blackhawks	Craig Adams
January 31, 2008	Joe Jensen	Pittsburgh Penguins	David Gove
February 7, 2008	Future Considerations	San Jose Sharks	J. D. Forrest
February 11, 2008	Joe Corvo; Patrick Eaves	Ottawa Senators	Mike Commodore; Cory Stillman
February 26, 2008	Tuomo Ruutu	Chicago Blackhawks	Andrew Ladd

Free agents
Player	Former team
Wade Brookbank	Pittsburgh Penguins
Jeff Hamilton	Chicago Blackhawks
David Tanabe	Boston Bruins

== Draft picks ==
Carolina's picks at the 2007 NHL entry draft in Columbus, Ohio. The Hurricanes have the 11th overall pick.

Round	#	Player	Position	Nationality	College/Junior/Club team (League)
1	11	Brandon Sutter	C/W	Canada	Red Deer Rebels (WHL)
3	72	Drayson Bowman	C/RW	United States	Spokane Chiefs (WHL)
4	102	Justin McCrae	C	Canada	Saskatoon Blades (WHL)
5	132	Chris Terry	LW	Canada	Plymouth Whalers (OHL)
6	162	Brett Bellemore	D	Canada	Plymouth Whalers (OHL)

== Farm teams ==
=== American Hockey League ===
The Albany River Rats are the Hurricanes American Hockey League affiliate for the 2007–08 AHL season.

=== ECHL ===
The Florida Everblades are the Hurricanes ECHL affiliate.
