= 2007–08 Washington Capitals season =

NHL hockey team season

2007–08 Washington Capitals
- Southeast Division champions
- Division: 1st Southeast
- Conference: 3rd Eastern
- 2007–08 record: 43–31–8
- Home record: 23–15–3
- Road record: 20–16–5
- Goals for: 242
- Goals against: 231

Team information
- General manager: George McPhee
- Coach: Glen Hanlon (Oct.–Nov.); Bruce Boudreau (Nov.–Apr.)
- Captain: Chris Clark
- Alternate captains: Donald Brashear (Nov.–Apr.); Alexander Ovechkin; Brian Sutherby (Oct.–Nov.)
- Arena: Verizon Center
- Average attendance: 15,473 (84.7%)

Team leaders
- Goals: Alexander Ovechkin (65)
- Assists: Nicklas Backstrom (55)
- Points: Alexander Ovechkin (112)
- Penalty minutes: Donald Brashear (119)
- Plus/minus: Viktor Kozlov; Alexander Ovechkin (+28)
- Wins: Olaf Kolzig (25)
- Goals against average: Cristobal Huet (1.63)

The 2007–08 Washington Capitals season began on October 5, 2007. It was the Capitals' 34th season in the National Hockey League (NHL).

On November 22, Head coach Glen Hanlon was fired after starting the Capitals with a 6–14–1 record, the team's worst start since the 1981–82 season. He was replaced by Bruce Boudreau on an interim basis until December 26, when Boudreau's position was made permanent.

On March 21, Alexander Ovechkin scored his 60th goal of the season in a game against the Atlanta Thrashers, becoming the first NHL player to accomplish the feat in 12 years, and tying Dennis Maruk's single-season franchise record. He would go on to break the record in the Capitals' next game, a 3–2 shootout win over the Carolina Hurricanes, on March 25. Ovechkin also became the first NHL player to score 60 goals in a season since Mario Lemieux and Jaromir Jagr in 1995–96.

On April 3, Ovechkin scored twice to break Luc Robitaille's single-season left-winger goal-scoring record of 63 goals.

Leading the league in scoring with 65 goals, 47 assists and 112 points in all 82 games played, Ovechkin simultaneously captured the Maurice "Rocket" Richard Trophy and Hart Memorial Trophy, awarded to the NHL's Most Valuable Player. It was also the first time in 41 seasons that a left-winger led the NHL in points since Bobby Hull led the league with 97 points in 1965–66. Moreover, Ovechkin also holds the distinction of being the only NHL player to have scored over 60 goals in a single NHL season during the 2000s. He also belongs to a select group of NHL players to have accomplished this rare feat in the salary cap era following the 2004–05 NHL lockout.

On April 5, the Capitals defeated the Florida Panthers 3–1 at home to clinch the franchise's third Southeast Division title and fourth Division title overall. The Capitals became the first team in NHL history to make the playoffs after being ranked 14th or lower in the standings at the season's midpoint.

In the playoffs, the Capitals won their first game against the Philadelphia Flyers, but then lost three consecutive games to fall behind three games to one. They managed to win their next two games to force a Game 7, but lost in overtime on a power play goal by Joffrey Lupul.

== Regular season ==
On March 3, 2008, the Capitals defeated the Boston Bruins at home by a score of 10–2. Alexander Ovechkin scored three goals in the game. It was the first time that the Capitals had scored 10 goals in a regular season game since January 11, 2003, when they defeated the Florida Panthers at home by a score of 12–2.

=== Season standings ===
==== Division standings ====
Southeast Division
		GP	W	L	OTL	GF	GA	Pts
**1**	**y – Washington Capitals**	**82**	**43**	**31**	**8**	**242**	**231**	**94**
2	Carolina Hurricanes	82	43	33	6	252	249	92
3	Florida Panthers	82	38	35	9	216	226	85
4	Atlanta Thrashers	82	34	40	8	216	272	76
5	Tampa Bay Lightning	82	31	42	9	223	267	71

==== Conference standings ====
Eastern Conference
R		Div	GP	W	L	OTL	GF	GA	Pts
**1**	**z – Montreal Canadiens**	**NE**	**82**	**47**	**25**	**10**	**262**	**222**	104
**2**	**y – Pittsburgh Penguins**	**AT**	**82**	**47**	**27**	**8**	**247**	**216**	102
**3**	**y – Washington Capitals**	**SE**	**82**	**43**	**31**	**8**	**242**	**231**	94
**4**	**New Jersey Devils**	**AT**	**82**	**46**	**29**	**7**	**206**	**197**	99
**5**	**New York Rangers**	**AT**	**82**	**42**	**27**	**13**	**213**	**199**	97
**6**	**Philadelphia Flyers**	**AT**	**82**	**42**	**29**	**11**	**248**	**233**	95
**7**	**Ottawa Senators**	**NE**	**82**	**43**	**31**	**8**	**261**	**247**	94
**8**	**Boston Bruins**	**NE**	**82**	**41**	**29**	**12**	**212**	**222**	94
8.5
9	Carolina Hurricanes	SE	82	43	33	6	252	249	92
10	Buffalo Sabres	NE	82	39	31	12	255	242	90
11	Florida Panthers	SE	82	38	35	9	216	226	85
12	Toronto Maple Leafs	NE	82	36	35	11	231	260	83
13	New York Islanders	AT	82	35	38	9	194	243	79
14	Atlanta Thrashers	SE	82	34	40	8	216	272	76
15	Tampa Bay Lightning	SE	82	31	42	9	223	267	71

Divisions: AT – Atlantic, NE – Northeast, SE – Southeast

bold – qualified for playoffs, y – division winner, z – placed first in conference (and division)

== Schedule and results ==
=== Regular season ===
2007–08 regular season
October: 5–6–0 (home: 2–3–0; road: 3–3–0)

Game	Date	Visitor	Score	Home	OT	Decision	Attendance	Record	Points	Recap
1	October 5	Washington	3 – 1	Atlanta		Johnson	18,707	1–0–0	2	W
2	October 6	Carolina	0 – 2	Washington		Kolzig	16,741	2–0–0	4	W
3	October 8	Washington	2 – 1	NY Islanders		Kolzig	16,234	3–0–0	6	W
4	October 12	Washington	1 – 3	NY Rangers		Kolzig	18,200	3–1–0	6	L
5	October 13	Washington	3 – 7	Buffalo		Johnson	18,690	3–2–0	6	L
6	October 18	NY Islanders	5 – 2	Washington		Kolzig	11,036	3–3–0	6	L
7	October 20	Pittsburgh	2 – 1	Washington		Johnson	18,277	3–4–0	6	L
8	October 24	Tampa Bay	3 – 5	Washington		Kolzig	10,226	4–4–0	8	W
9	October 26	Vancouver	3 – 2	Washington		Kolzig	12,705	4–5–0	8	L
10	October 27	Washington	3 – 4	St. Louis		Johnson	16,863	4–6–0	8	L
11	October 29	Washington	7 – 1	Toronto		Kolzig	19,316	5–6–0	10	W

November: 3–10–2 (home: 1–5–1; road: 2–5–1)

Game	Date	Visitor	Score	Home	OT	Decision	Attendance	Record	Points	Recap
12	November 1	Washington	0 – 2	NY Rangers		Kolzig	18,200	5–7–0	10	L
13	November 2	Philadelphia	3 – 2	Washington		Kolzig	16,055	5–8–0	10	L
14	November 5	Washington	0 – 5	Carolina		Kolzig	12,171	5–9–0	10	L
15	November 6	Washington	1 – 2	Atlanta	OT	Johnson	15,530	5–9–1	11	OTL
16	November 8	Washington	4 – 1	Ottawa		Kolzig	19,666	6–9–1	13	W
17	November 10	Tampa Bay	5 – 2	Washington		Kolzig	14,617	6–10–1	13	L
18	November 15	Washington	1 – 2	Florida		Kolzig	12,101	6–11–1	13	L
19	November 16	Washington	2 – 5	Tampa Bay		Kolzig	19,526	6–12–1	13	L
20	November 19	Florida	4 – 3	Washington		Kolzig	13,411	6–13–1	13	L
21	November 21	Atlanta	5 – 1	Washington		Kolzig	11,669	6–14–1	13	L
22	November 23	Washington	4 – 3	Philadelphia	OT	Kolzig	19,727	7–14–1	15	W
23	November 24	Carolina	2 – 5	Washington		Kolzig	13,650	8–14–1	17	W
24	November 26	Buffalo	3 – 1	Washington		Kolzig	11,204	8–15–1	17	L
25	November 28	Florida	2 – 1	Washington	SO	Kolzig	10,526	8–15–2	18	OTL
26	November 30	Washington	3 – 4	Carolina		Kolzig	16,386	8–16–2	18	L

December: 7–3–3 (home: 4–2–0; road: 3–1–3)

Game	Date	Visitor	Score	Home	OT	Decision	Attendance	Record	Points	Recap
27	December 1	Washington	2 – 1	Florida		Johnson	14,333	9–16–2	20	W
28	December 7	Washington	2 – 3	New Jersey		Kolzig	16,265	9–17–2	20	L
29	December 8	Atlanta	3 – 6	Washington		Kolzig	14,014	10–17–2	22	W
30	December 10	New Jersey	2 – 3	Washington		Kolzig	10,719	11–17–2	24	W
31	December 12	NY Rangers	4 – 5	Washington	OT	Kolzig	12,553	12–17–2	26	W
32	December 14	Buffalo	5 – 3	Washington		Kolzig	17,035	12–18–2	26	L
33	December 15	Washington	3 – 2	Tampa Bay		Johnson	18,367	13–18–2	28	W
34	December 17	Washington	3 – 4	Detroit	SO	Kolzig	19,483	13–18–3	29	OTL
35	December 20	Montreal	5 – 2	Washington		Kolzig	12,670	13–19–3	29	L
36	December 22	Washington	2 – 3	NY Islanders	OT	Kolzig	14,305	13–19–4	30	OTL
37	December 26	Tampa Bay	2 – 3	Washington		Kolzig	15,035	14–19–4	32	W
38	December 27	Washington	3 – 4	Pittsburgh	OT	Johnson	17,132	14–19–5	33	OTL
39	December 29	Washington	8 – 6	Ottawa		Kolzig	20,296	15–19–5	35	W

January: 9–4–0 (home: 7–1–0; road: 2–3–0)

Game	Date	Visitor	Score	Home	OT	Decision	Attendance	Record	Points	Recap
40	January 1	Ottawa	3 – 6	Washington		Kolzig	14,547	16–19–5	37	W
41	January 3	Washington	0 – 2	Boston		Kolzig	12,240	16–20–5	37	L
42	January 5	Washington	5 – 4	Montreal	OT	Kolzig	21,273	17–20–5	39	W
43	January 9	Colorado	1 – 2	Washington		Kolzig	16,168	18–20–5	41	W
44	January 13	Philadelphia	6 – 4	Washington		Kolzig	17,713	18–21–5	41	L
45	January 15	Ottawa	2 – 4	Washington		Johnson	15,261	19–21–5	43	W
46	January 17	Edmonton	4 – 5	Washington	SO	Kolzig	13,399	20–21–5	45	W
47	January 19	Florida	3 – 5	Washington		Johnson	16,973	21–21–5	47	W
48	January 21	Washington	6 – 5	Pittsburgh	SO	Kolzig	17,050	22–21–5	49	W
49	January 23	Washington	2 – 3	Toronto		Kolzig	19,479	22–22–5	49	L
50	January 24	Toronto	1 – 2	Washington		Johnson	14,094	23–22–5	51	W
51	January 29	Washington	0 – 4	Montreal		Johnson	21,273	23–23–5	51	L
52	January 31	Montreal	4 – 5	Washington	OT	Kolzig	14,930	24–23–5	53	W

February: 6–4–3 (home: 2–2–2; road: 4–2–1)

Game	Date	Visitor	Score	Home	OT	Decision	Attendance	Record	Points	Recap
53	February 2	Atlanta	2 – 0	Washington		Kolzig	17,205	24–24–5	53	L
54	February 5	Washington	4 – 3	Columbus	OT	Johnson	14,450	25–24–5	55	W
55	February 6	Washington	4 – 3	Philadelphia		Kolzig	19,778	26–24–5	57	W
56	February 8	Carolina	2 – 1	Washington		Johnson	18,204	26–25–5	57	L
57	February 10	NY Rangers	2 – 3	Washington	OT	Kolzig	17,873	27–25–5	59	W
58	February 13	Washington	2 – 3	Atlanta	SO	Kolzig	15,285	27–25–6	60	OTL
59	February 15	Washington	2 – 4	Florida		Johnson	16,202	27–26–6	60	L
60	February 16	Washington	3 – 2	Tampa Bay		Kolzig	20,454	28–26–6	62	W
61	February 20	NY Islanders	3 – 2	Washington	SO	Kolzig	17,584	28–26–7	63	OTL
62	February 23	Washington	3 – 6	Carolina		Kolzig	18,680	28–27–7	63	L
63	February 24	New Jersey	2 – 1	Washington	OT	Johnson	18,277	28–27–8	64	OTL
64	February 26	Minnesota	1 – 4	Washington		Kolzig	17,391	29–27–8	66	W
65	February 29	Washington	4 – 0	New Jersey		Huet	16,580	30–27–8	68	W

March: 10–4–0 (home: 4–2–0; road: 6–2–0)

Game	Date	Visitor	Score	Home	OT	Decision	Attendance	Record	Points	Recap
66	March 1	Toronto	3 – 2	Washington		Kolzig	18,277	30–28–8	68	L
67	March 3	Boston	2 – 10	Washington		Huet	17,189	31–28–8	70	W
68	March 5	Washington	3 – 1	Buffalo		Kolzig	18,690	32–28–8	72	W
69	March 8	Washington	1 – 2	Boston		Huet	17,565	32–29–8	72	L
70	March 9	Pittsburgh	4 – 2	Washington		Huet	18,277	32–30–8	72	L
71	March 12	Calgary	2 – 3	Washington		Kolzig	17,560	33–30–8	74	W
72	March 14	Atlanta	1 – 4	Washington		Kolzig	18,208	34–30–8	76	W
73	March 16	Boston	1 – 2	Washington	SO	Huet	18,277	35–30–8	78	W
74	March 18	Washington	4 – 2	Nashville		Huet	17,133	36–30–8	80	W
75	March 19	Washington	0 – 5	Chicago		Kolzig	20,942	36–31–8	80	L
76	March 21	Washington	5 – 3	Atlanta		Huet	18,562	37–31–8	82	W
77	March 25	Washington	3 – 2	Carolina	SO	Huet	18,680	38–31–8	84	W
78	March 27	Washington	4 – 3	Tampa Bay	OT	Huet	17,777	39–31–8	86	W
79	March 29	Washington	3 – 0	Florida		Huet	17,832	40–31–8	88	W

April: 3–0–0 (home: 3–0–0; road: 0–0–0)

Game	Date	Visitor	Score	Home	OT	Decision	Attendance	Record	Points	Recap
80	April 1	Carolina	1 – 4	Washington		Huet	18,277	41–31–8	90	W
81	April 3	Tampa Bay	1 – 4	Washington		Huet	16,311	42–31–8	92	W
82	April 5	Florida	1 – 3	Washington		Huet	18,277	43–31–8	94	W

Legend: W Win (2 points) L Loss (0 points) OTL Overtime/shootout loss (1 point)

=== Playoffs ===
2008 Stanley Cup playoffs
Eastern Conference Quarterfinals vs. (6) Philadelphia Flyers – Flyers win 4–3

Game	Date	Visitor	Score	Home	OT	Decision	Attendance	Series	Recap
1	April 11	Philadelphia	4 – 5	Washington		Huet	18,277	Capitals lead 1–0	W
2	April 13	Philadelphia	2 – 0	Washington		Huet	18,277	Series tied 1–1	L
3	April 15	Washington	3 – 6	Philadelphia		Huet	19,822	Flyers lead 2–1	L
4	April 17	Washington	3 – 4	Philadelphia	2OT	Huet	19,913	Flyers lead 3–1	L
5	April 19	Philadelphia	2 – 3	Washington		Huet	18,277	Flyers lead 3–2	W
6	April 21	Washington	4 – 2	Philadelphia		Huet	19,297	Series tied 3–3	W
7	April 22	Philadelphia	3 – 2	Washington	OT	Huet	18,277	Flyers win 4–3	L

Legend: W Win L Loss

== Player statistics ==
=== Skaters ===
Note: GP = Games played; G = Goals; A = Assists; Pts = Points; +/- = Plus/minus; PIM = Penalty minutes

Regular Season
Top 10 Players	GP	G	A	Pts	+/-	PIM
Alexander Ovechkin	82	65	47	112	28	40
Nicklas Backstrom	82	14	55	69	13	24
Mike Green	82	18	38	56	6	62
Viktor Kozlov	81	16	38	54	28	18
Alexander Semin	63	26	16	42	-18	54
Michael Nylander	40	11	26	37	-19	24
Brooks Laich	82	21	16	37	-3	35
Tomas Fleischmann	75	10	20	30	-7	18
Tom Poti	71	2	27	29	9	46
Jeff Schultz	72	5	13	18	12	28
Playoffs
Top 10 Players	GP	G	A	Pts	+/-	PIM
Alexander Ovechkin	7	4	5	9	-1	0
Alexander Semin	7	3	5	8	2	8
Mike Green	7	3	4	7	-2	15
Brooks Laich	7	1	5	6	2	4
Nicklas Backstrom	7	3	2	5	2	2
Sergei Fedorov	7	1	3	4	-1	2
Viktor Kozlov	7	0	3	3	-4	2
Donald Brashear	7	1	1	2	1	0
Dave Steckel	7	1	1	2	-2	4
Matt Bradley	7	0	2	2	-3	2

=== Goaltenders ===
Note: GP = Games played; TOI = Time on ice (minutes); W = Wins; L = Losses; OT = Overtime losses;
GA = Goals against; SO = Shutouts; Sv% = Save percentage; GAA = Goals against average

Regular Season
Player	GP	TOI	W	L	OT	GA	SO	Sv%	GAA
Olaf Kolzig	54	3154	25	21	6	153	1	.892	2.91
Brent Johnson	19	1032	7	8	2	46	0	.908	2.67
Cristobal Huet	13	771	11	2	0	21	2	.936	1.63
Playoffs
Player	GP	TOI	W	L	OT	GA	SO	Sv%	GAA
Cristobal Huet	7	451	3	2	2	22	0	.909	2.93

== Awards and records ==
=== Milestones ===
Regular Season
Player	Milestone	Reached
Nicklas Backstrom	1st NHL Game; 1st NHL Assist; 1st NHL Point	October 5, 2007
Alexander Ovechkin	200th NHL Point	October 6, 2007
Milan Jurcina	100th NHL PIM	October 8, 2007
Alexander Ovechkin	100th NHL Goal	October 12, 2007
Joe Motzko	1st NHL Assist	October 18, 2007
Tom Poti	600th NHL Game	October 18, 2007
Mike Green	100th NHL Game	October 24, 2007
Dave Steckel	1st NHL Goal; 1st NHL Point	October 24, 2007
Jeff Schultz	1st NHL Goal	October 29, 2007
Chris Bourque	1st NHL Game	November 6, 2007
Nicklas Backstrom	1st NHL Goal	November 8, 2007
Matt Pettinger	300th NHL Game	November 23, 2007
Tom Poti	200th NHL Assist	November 23, 2007
Alexander Semin	100th NHL Point	December 8, 2007
Quintin Laing	1st NHL Goal	December 10, 2007
Alexander Ovechkin	200th NHL Game	December 26, 2007
Brian Pothier	100th NHL Point	December 27, 2007
Alexander Ovechkin	1st NHL 4-Goal Game	December 29, 2007
Michael Nylander	200th NHL Goal	January 13, 2008
Brooks Laich	200th NHL Game	January 23, 2008
Steve Eminger	200th NHL Game	January 24, 2008
John Erskine	200th NHL Game	January 29, 2008
Viktor Kozlov	800th NHL Game	January 29, 2008
Donald Brashear	900th NHL Game	February 5, 2008
Olaf Kolzig	700th NHL Game	February 10, 2008
Viktor Kozlov	300th NHL Assist	February 16, 2008
Sami Lepisto	1st NHL Game	February 16, 2008
Tomas Fleischmann	100th NHL Game	February 20, 2008
Donald Brashear	200th NHL Point	March 3, 2008
Olaf Kolzig	300th NHL Win	March 12, 2008
Sami Lepisto	1st NHL Point	March 14, 2008
Alexander Ovechkin	300th NHL Point	March 18, 2008
Alexander Ovechkin	61st Goal (Franchise single season record)	March 25, 2008
Alexander Ovechkin	64th Goal (NHL single season record - goals by LW)	April 3, 2008
Alexander Ovechkin	65th Goal (Franchise single season record)	April 3, 2008
Nicklas Backstrom	55th Assist (Franchise single season record - rookie assists)	April 5, 2008

=== Awards ===
Player	Award
Alexander Ovechkin	All-Star forward
Nicklas Backstrom	NHL YoungStar
Alexander Ovechkin	First Star of the Month (January)
Nicklas Backstrom	Rookie of the Month (January)
Alexander Ovechkin	First Star of the Month (March)
Alexander Ovechkin	Art Ross Trophy
Alexander Ovechkin	Maurice "Rocket" Richard Trophy
Alexander Ovechkin	Hart Memorial Trophy
Alexander Ovechkin	Lester B. Pearson Award
Bruce Boudreau	Jack Adams Award

== Transactions ==
The Capitals have been involved in the following transactions during the 2007–08 season.

=== Trades ===
November 19, 2007	To Washington Capitals 2nd-round pick in 2009 – Jeremy Morin	To Anaheim Ducks Brian Sutherby
February 26, 2008	To Washington Capitals Cristobal Huet	To Montreal Canadiens 2nd-round pick in 2009 – Jeremy Morin
February 26, 2008	To Washington Capitals Sergei Fedorov	To Columbus Blue Jackets Ted Ruth
February 26, 2008	To Washington Capitals Matt Cooke	To Vancouver Canucks Matt Pettinger
February 26, 2008	To Washington Capitals Alexandre Giroux	To Atlanta Thrashers Joe Motzko

=== Free agents ===
Player	Former team	Contract Terms
Tom Poti	New York Islanders	4 years, $14 million
Viktor Kozlov	New York Islanders	2 years, $5 million
Michael Nylander	New York Rangers	4 years, $19.5 million
Joe Motzko	Anaheim Ducks	2 years, $1.025 million
Jason Morgan	Minnesota Wild	1 year, $500,000

Player	New team
Jiri Novotny	Columbus Blue Jackets
Joey Tenute	Phoenix Coyotes
Alexandre Giroux	Atlanta Thrashers
Kris Beech	Pittsburgh Penguins

== Draft picks ==
Washington's picks at the 2007 NHL entry draft in Columbus, Ohio. The Capitals had the 5th overall pick .

Round	#	Player	Position	Nationality	College/Junior/Club team (League)
1	5	Karl Alzner	D	Canada	Calgary Hitmen (WHL)
2	34	Josh Godfrey	D	Canada	Sault Ste. Marie Greyhounds (OHL)
2	46	Ted Ruth	D	United States	U.S. National Team Development Program (USHL)
3	84	Phil Desimone	C	United States	Sioux City Musketeers (USHL)
4	108	Brett Bruneteau	C	United States	Omaha Lancers (USHL)
5	125	Brett Leffler	RW	Canada	Regina Pats (WHL)
6	154	Dan Dunn	G	Canada	Wellington Dukes (OPRJA)
6	180	Justin Taylor	C	Canada	London Knights (OHL)
7	185	Nick Larson	C	United States	Omaha Lancers (USHL)
7	199	Andrew Glass	RW	United States	

== Farm teams ==
=== American Hockey League ===
The Hershey Bears are the Capitals American Hockey League affiliate in 2007–08.

=== ECHL ===
The South Carolina Stingrays are the Capitals ECHL affiliate in 2007–08.

== See also ==
- 2007–08 NHL season
