= 2007–08 Atlanta Thrashers season =

National Hockey League team season

2007–08 Atlanta Thrashers
- Division: 4th Southeast
- Conference: 14th Eastern
- 2007–08 record: 34–40–8
- Home record: 19–18–3
- Road record: 15–22–5
- Goals for: 157
- Goals against: 191

Team information
- General manager: Don Waddell
- Coach: Bob Hartley (Oct.); Don Waddell (Oct.–Apr.) interim
- Captain: Bobby Holik
- Alternate captains: Niclas Havelid; Marian Hossa (Oct.–Feb.); Ilya Kovalchuk; Vyacheslav Kozlov; Mark Recchi (Feb.–Apr.)
- Arena: Philips Arena
- Average attendance: 15,831 (85.4%)

Team leaders
- Goals: Ilya Kovalchuk (52)
- Assists: Ilya Kovalchuk (35)
- Points: Ilya Kovalchuk (87)
- Penalty minutes: Eric Boulton (91)
- Plus/minus: Colby Armstrong (+4); Darren Haydar (+4)
- Wins: Johan Hedberg (13); Kari Lehtonen (13)
- Goals against average: Ondrej Pavelec (3.11)

The 2007–08 Atlanta Thrashers season was the 25th season of play for the National Hockey League franchise that was established on June 22, 1979, and 33rd season for the organization overall. A year after winning the Southeast Division, the Thrashers failed to qualify for the playoffs.

Key dates prior to the start of the season:

- The 2007 NHL entry draft took place in Columbus, Ohio, on June 22–23.
- The free agency period began on July 1.

== Regular season ==
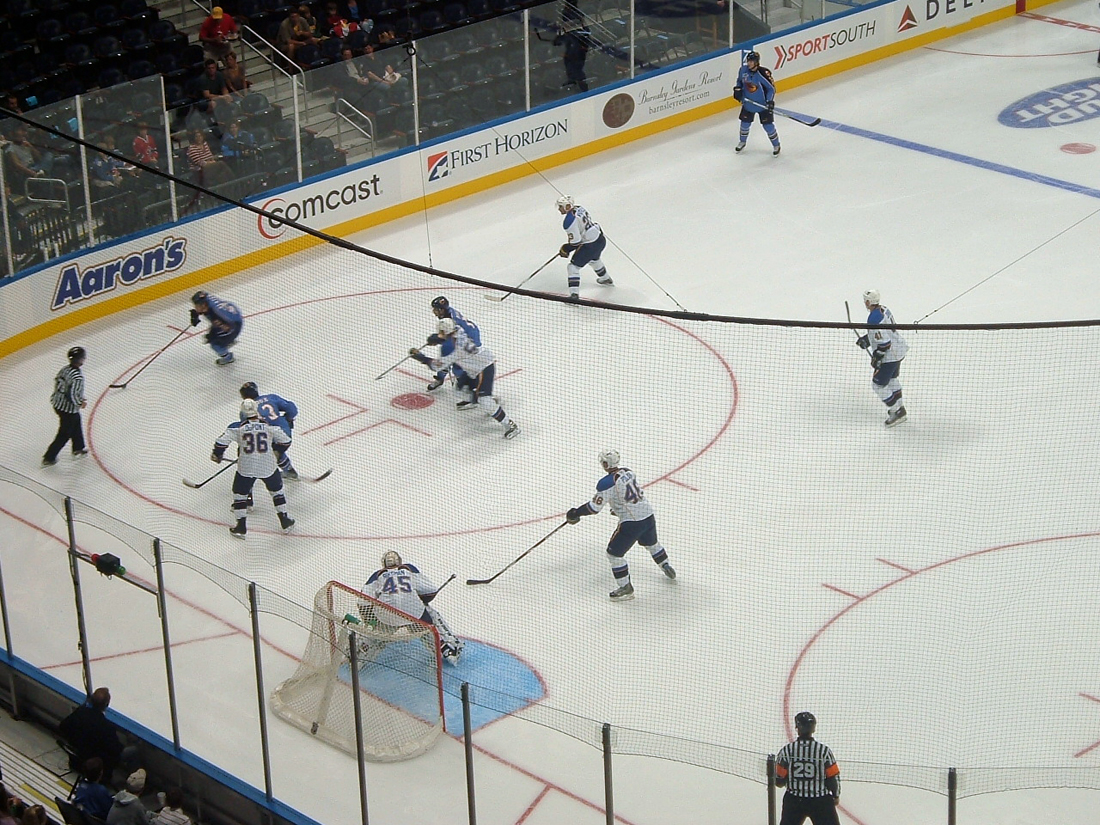

Starting off 0–6–0, the Thrashers fired head coach Bob Hartley on October 17, 2007, replacing him on an interim basis with general manager Don Waddell.

On December 23, 2007, Marian Hossa scored just 19 seconds into overtime to give Atlanta a 3–2 road win over the St. Louis Blues. Hossa tied Martin Erat, who also scored 15 seconds into the overtime period of the Predators' November 15, 2007, 5–4 home win over the Chicago Blackhawks, for the fastest overtime goal of the 2007–08 regular season.

Excluding six shootout goals, the Thrashers allowed 266 goals, tied with the Tampa Bay Lightning for the most in the NHL.

=== Divisional standings ===
Southeast Division
		GP	W	L	OTL	GF	GA	Pts
**1**	**y – Washington Capitals**	**82**	**43**	**31**	**8**	**242**	**231**	**94**
2	Carolina Hurricanes	82	43	33	6	252	249	92
3	Florida Panthers	82	38	35	9	216	226	85
4	Atlanta Thrashers	82	34	40	8	216	272	76
5	Tampa Bay Lightning	82	31	42	9	223	267	71

=== Conference standings ===
Eastern Conference
R		Div	GP	W	L	OTL	GF	GA	Pts
**1**	**z – Montreal Canadiens**	**NE**	**82**	**47**	**25**	**10**	**262**	**222**	104
**2**	**y – Pittsburgh Penguins**	**AT**	**82**	**47**	**27**	**8**	**247**	**216**	102
**3**	**y – Washington Capitals**	**SE**	**82**	**43**	**31**	**8**	**242**	**231**	94
**4**	**New Jersey Devils**	**AT**	**82**	**46**	**29**	**7**	**206**	**197**	99
**5**	**New York Rangers**	**AT**	**82**	**42**	**27**	**13**	**213**	**199**	97
**6**	**Philadelphia Flyers**	**AT**	**82**	**42**	**29**	**11**	**248**	**233**	95
**7**	**Ottawa Senators**	**NE**	**82**	**43**	**31**	**8**	**261**	**247**	94
**8**	**Boston Bruins**	**NE**	**82**	**41**	**29**	**12**	**212**	**222**	94
8.5
9	Carolina Hurricanes	SE	82	43	33	6	252	249	92
10	Buffalo Sabres	NE	82	39	31	12	255	242	90
11	Florida Panthers	SE	82	38	35	9	216	226	85
12	Toronto Maple Leafs	NE	82	36	35	11	231	260	83
13	New York Islanders	AT	82	35	38	9	194	243	79
14	Atlanta Thrashers	SE	82	34	40	8	216	272	76
15	Tampa Bay Lightning	SE	82	31	42	9	223	267	71

Divisions: AT – Atlantic, NE – Northeast, SE – Southeast

bold – qualified for playoffs, y – division winner, z – placed first in conference (and division)

== Schedule and results ==
2007–08 regular season
October: 4–8–0 (home: 1–3–0; road: 3–5–0)

Game	Date	Visitor	Score	Home	OT	Decision	Attendance	Record	Points	Recap
1	October 5	Washington	3 – 1	Atlanta		Lehtonen	18,707	0–1–0	0	L
2	October 6	Atlanta	2 – 5	Tampa Bay		Hedberg	19,220	0–2–0	0	L
3	October 10	Ottawa	3 – 1	Atlanta		Lehtonen	12,751	0–3–0	0	L
4	October 11	Atlanta	0 – 6	Buffalo		Lehtonen	18,690	0–4–0	0	L
5	October 13	New Jersey	6 – 4	Atlanta		Lehtonen	15,606	0–5–0	0	L
6	October 16	Atlanta	0 – 4	Philadelphia		Hedberg	18,933	0–6–0	0	L
7	October 18	NY Rangers	3 – 5	Atlanta		Hedberg	14,076	1–6–0	2	W
8	October 20	Atlanta	2 – 6	Tampa Bay		Hedberg	19,420	1–7–0	2	L
9	October 23	Atlanta	5 – 4	Toronto	SO	Hedberg	19,210	2–7–0	4	W
10	October 25	Atlanta	0 – 3	Nashville		Hedberg	13,383	2–8–0	4	L
11	October 27	Atlanta	3 – 2	Chicago		Hedberg	15,789	3–8–0	6	W
12	October 30	Atlanta	3 – 2	Montreal	SO	Hedberg	21,273	4–8–0	8	W

November: 7–5–0 (home: 3–3–0; road: 4–2–0)

Game	Date	Visitor	Score	Home	OT	Decision	Attendance	Record	Points	Recap
13	November 1	Atlanta	4 – 6	Ottawa		Pavelec	18,538	4–9–0	8	L
14	November 3	Atlanta	6 – 4	Tampa Bay		Pavelec	19,155	5–9–0	10	W
15	November 6	Washington	1 – 2	Atlanta	OT	Pavelec	15,530	6–9–0	12	W
16	November 9	Atlanta	4 – 1	Florida		Pavelec	14,268	7–9–0	14	W
17	November 10	Carolina	5 – 3	Atlanta		Pavelec	18,545	7–10–0	14	L
18	November 13	Florida	2 – 3	Atlanta	OT	Hedberg	12,599	8–10–0	16	W
19	November 16	Atlanta	3 – 0	Carolina		Hedberg	14,632	9–10–0	18	W
20	November 19	Tampa Bay	3 – 4	Atlanta	OT	Hedberg	13,419	10–10–0	20	W
21	November 21	Atlanta	5 – 1	Washington		Hedberg	11,669	11–10–0	22	W
22	November 23	New Jersey	3 – 0	Atlanta		Hedberg	18,545	11–11–0	22	L
23	November 24	Atlanta	0 – 5	Pittsburgh		Pavelec	17,132	11–12–0	22	L
24	November 29	Toronto	4 – 2	Atlanta		Hedberg	14,031	11–13–0	22	L

December: 8–7–1 (home: 6–3–0; road: 2–4–1)

Game	Date	Visitor	Score	Home	OT	Decision	Attendance	Record	Points	Recap
25	December 1	Atlanta	4 – 0	NY Islanders		Lehtonen	15,355	12–13–0	24	W
26	December 2	Atlanta	2 – 3	New Jersey	SO	Hedberg	14,978	12–13–1	25	OTL
27	December 5	NY Islanders	3 – 4	Atlanta	SO	Lehtonen	14,018	13–13–1	27	W
28	December 7	NY Rangers	2 – 4	Atlanta		Hedberg	18,204	14–13–1	29	W
29	December 8	Atlanta	3 – 6	Washington		Lehtonen	14,014	14–14–1	29	L
30	December 12	Boston	5 – 3	Atlanta		Hedberg	14,265	14–15–1	29	L
31	December 14	Toronto	4 – 0	Atlanta		Lehtonen	16,424	14–16–1	29	L
32	December 15	Atlanta	3 – 7	Ottawa		Hedberg	20,082	14–17–1	29	L
33	December 18	Tampa Bay	2 – 6	Atlanta		Lehtonen	14,060	15–17–1	31	W
34	December 20	Ottawa	2 – 3	Atlanta		Lehtonen	14,085	16–17–1	33	W
35	December 22	Montreal	2 – 3	Atlanta	SO	Lehtonen	17,153	17–17–1	35	W
36	December 23	Atlanta	3 – 2	St. Louis	OT	Lehtonen	17,731	18–17–1	37	W
37	December 26	Atlanta	0 – 2	Columbus		Lehtonen	15,726	18–18–1	37	L
38	December 27	Florida	5 – 3	Atlanta		Lehtonen	16,080	18–19–1	37	L
39	December 29	Boston	0 – 5	Atlanta		Lehtonen	18,545	19–19–1	39	W
40	December 31	Atlanta	2 – 5	Boston		Lehtonen	17,565	19–20–1	39	L

January: 5–5–3 (home: 3–3–2; road: 2–2–1)

Game	Date	Visitor	Score	Home	OT	Decision	Attendance	Record	Points	Recap
41	January 2	Atlanta	5 – 4	Carolina	OT	Hedberg	13,506	20–20–1	41	W
42	January 4	Carolina	4 – 3	Atlanta		Lehtonen	16,097	20–21–1	41	L
43	January 6	Buffalo	2 – 5	Atlanta		Hedberg	15,213	21–21–1	43	W
44	January 8	Philadelphia	4 – 1	Atlanta		Hedberg	13,047	21–22–1	43	L
45	January 10	Florida	3 – 2	Atlanta	SO	Lehtonen	14,805	21–22–2	44	OTL
46	January 12	Pittsburgh	2 – 3	Atlanta	SO	Lehtonen	18,545	22–22–2	46	W
47	January 15	Atlanta	5 – 1	Detroit		Lehtonen	17,408	23–22–2	48	W
48	January 17	Montreal	3 – 2	Atlanta	SO	Lehtonen	16,181	23–22–3	49	OTL
49	January 18	Atlanta	1 – 10	Buffalo		Hedberg	18,690	23–23–3	49	L
50	January 20	Edmonton	4 – 2	Atlanta		Lehtonen	16,683	23–24–3	49	L
51	January 22	Atlanta	0 – 4	NY Rangers		Lehtonen	18,200	23–25–3	49	L
52	January 24	Atlanta	1 – 2	NY Rangers	SO	Hedberg	18,200	23–25–4	50	OTL
53	January 30	Pittsburgh	1 – 4	Atlanta		Lehtonen	14,070	24–25–4	52	W

February: 5–6–1 (home: 3–2–1; road: 2–4–0)

Game	Date	Visitor	Score	Home	OT	Decision	Attendance	Record	Points	Recap
54	February 1	Buffalo	4 – 5	Atlanta	SO	Lehtonen	17,064	25–25–4	54	W
55	February 2	Atlanta	2 – 0	Washington		Lehtonen		26–25–4	56	W
56	February 5	Philadelphia	3 – 2	Atlanta		Lehtonen	15,082	26–26–4	56	L
57	February 7	Vancouver	2 – 1	Atlanta		Lehtonen	16,813	26–27–4	56	L
58	February 9	Tampa Bay	1 – 2	Atlanta	OT	Lehtonen	18,879	27–27–4	58	W
59	February 13	Washington	2 – 3	Atlanta	SO	Lehtonen	15,285	28–27–4	60	W
60	February 15	Atlanta	4 – 3	New Jersey	SO	Hedberg	14,475	29–27–4	62	W
61	February 16	Atlanta	1 – 4	NY Islanders		Lehtonen	16,234	29–28–4	62	L
62	February 21	Atlanta	3 – 5	Carolina		Lehtonen	13,548	29–29–4	62	L
63	February 23	Atlanta	1 – 3	Toronto		Lehtonen	19,390	29–30–4	62	L
64	February 26	Atlanta	1 – 5	Montreal		Lehtonen	21,273	29–31–4	62	L
65	February 28	NY Islanders	5 – 4	Atlanta	OT	Lehtonen	16,332	29–31–5	63	OTL

March: 4–8–3 (home: 2–4–0; road: 2–4–3)

Game	Date	Visitor	Score	Home	OT	Decision	Attendance	Record	Points	Recap
66	March 1	Atlanta	2 – 3	Boston	OT	Hedberg	17,565	29–31–6	64	OTL
67	March 2	Atlanta	2 – 3	Pittsburgh	SO	Lehtonen	17,132	29–31–7	65	OTL
68	March 5	Carolina	6 – 3	Atlanta		Hedberg	13,032	29–32–7	65	L
69	March 7	Minnesota	2 – 3	Atlanta	SO	Hedberg	18,709	30–32–7	67	W
70	March 8	Atlanta	2 – 3	Florida	OT	Lehtonen	16,614	30–32–8	68	OTL
71	March 11	Colorado	5 – 2	Atlanta		Hedberg	14,089	30–33–8	69	L
72	March 13	Calgary	4 – 6	Atlanta		Lehtonen	16,244	31–33–8	70	W
73	March 14	Atlanta	1 – 4	Washington		Lehtonen	18,208	31–34–8	70	L
74	March 16	Atlanta	1 – 3	Florida		Hedberg	15,704	31–35–8	70	L
75	March 18	Atlanta	2 – 3	Philadelphia		Lehtonen	19,564	31–36–8	70	L
76	March 19	Carolina	5 – 3	Atlanta		Hedberg	13,251	31–37–8	70	L
77	March 21	Washington	5 – 3	Atlanta		Lehtonen	18,562	31–38–8	70	L
78	March 27	Atlanta	3 - 2	Florida		Lehtonen	17,301	32–38–8	72	W
79	March 28	Atlanta	1 - 7	Carolina		Hedberg	17,833	32–39–8	72	L
80	March 31	Atlanta	2 - 0	Tampa Bay		Lehtonen	17,441	33–39–8	74	W

April: 1–1–0 (home: 1–1–0; road: 0–0–0)

Game	Date	Visitor	Score	Home	OT	Decision	Attendance	Record	Points	Recap
81	April 1	Florida	3 - 2	Atlanta		Hedberg	15,453	33–40–8	74	L
82	April 5	Tampa Bay	1 - 4	Atlanta		Lehtonen	18,732	34–40–8	76	W

Legend: W Win (2 points) L Loss (0 points) OTL Overtime/shootout loss (1 point)

== Skaters ==
Note: GP = Games played; G = Goals; A = Assists; Pts = Points; PIM = Penalty minutes

	Regular season
Player	GP	G	A	Pts	PIM
Ilya Kovalchuk	79	52	35	87	52
Marian Hossa	60	26	22	48	30
Eric Perrin	81	12	33	45	26
Vyacheslav Kozlov	82	17	24	41	26
Mark Recchi	53	12	28	40	20
Tobias Enstrom	82	5	33	38	42
Todd White	74	14	23	37	36
Bobby Holik	82	15	19	34	90
Chris Thorburn	73	5	13	18	92
Bryan Little	48	6	10	16	18
Pascal Dupuis	62	10	5	15	24
Niclas Havelid	81	1	10	11	42
Jim Slater	69	8	5	13	41
Colby Armstrong	18	4	7	11	6
Ken Klee	72	1	9	10	60
Eric Boulton	74	4	5	9	127
Alexei Zhitnik	65	3	5	8	58
Darren Haydar	16	1	7	8	2
Garnet Exelby	79	2	5	7	85
Steve McCarthy	55	1	6	7	48
Joel Kwiatkowski	18	0	5	5	20
Colin Stuart	18	3	2	5	6
Brad Larsen	62	1	3	4	12
Erik Christensen	10	2	2	4	2
Brett Sterling	13	1	2	3	14
Mark Popovic	33	0	2	2	10
Jordan Smotherman	2	1	1	2	0
Kevin Doell	8	0	1	1	4
Boris Valabik	7	0	0	0	42

== Goaltenders ==
Note: GP = Games played; TOI = Time on ice (minutes); W = Wins; L = Losses; OT = Overtime/shootout losses; GA = Goals against; SO = Shutouts; SV% = Save percentage; GAA = Goals against average

	Regular season
Player	GP	TOI	W	L	OT	GA	SO	SV%	GAA
Kari Lehtonen	48	2707	17	22	5	131	4	.916	2.90
Johan Hedberg	36	1927	14	15	3	111	1	.892	3.46
Ondrej Pavelec	7	347	3	3	0	18	0	.905	3.11

== Awards and records ==
=== Milestones ===
Regular season
Player	Milestone	Reached
Tobias Enstrom	1st NHL game	October 5, 2007
Bryan Little	1st NHL game 1st NHL goal 1st NHL point	October 5, 2007
Brett Sterling	1st NHL game	October 5, 2007
Tobias Enstrom	1st NHL assist 1st NHL point	October 6, 2007
Darren Haydar	1st NHL goal 1st NHL assist 1st NHL point	October 13, 2007
Bryan Little	1st NHL assist	October 13, 2007
Brett Sterling	1st NHL assist 1st NHL point	October 13, 2007
Ken Klee	800th NHL PIM	October 16, 2007
Ondrej Pavelec	1st NHL game	October 20, 2007
Brett Sterling	1st NHL goal	October 20, 2007
Tobias Enstrom	1st NHL goal	October 23, 2007
Ken Klee	800th NHL game	October 25, 2007
Ilya Kovalchuk	400th NHL game	November 1, 2007
Ondrej Pavelec	1st NHL win	November 3, 2007
Eric Perrin	100th NHL game	November 3, 2007
Todd White	100th NHL goal	November 6, 2007

== Transactions ==
The Thrashers have been involved in the following transactions during the 2007–08 season.

=== Trades ===
June 26, 2007	To St. Louis Blues Keith Tkachuk conditional 4th round pick in 2008	To Atlanta Thrashers conditional 1st round pick in 2008
December 8, 2007	To Atlanta Thrashers Mark Recchi	Claimed off waivers from Pittsburgh Penguins
February 26, 2008	To Pittsburgh Penguins Marian Hossa; Pascal Dupuis	To Atlanta Thrashers Colby Armstrong; Erik Christensen; Angelo Esposito; 2008 1st round pick (Daultan Leveille)

=== Free agents ===
Player	Former team	Contract terms
Todd White	Minnesota Wild	4 years, $9.5 million
Eric Perrin	Tampa Bay Lightning	2 years, $1.15. million
Ken Klee	Colorado Avalanche	2 years, $2.5 million
Alexandre Giroux	Washington Capitals	2 years, $925,000

Player	New team
Jon Sim	New York Islanders
Greg de Vries	Nashville Predators
Eric Belanger	Minnesota Wild
Shane Hnidy	Anaheim Ducks
Derek MacKenzie	Columbus Blue Jackets
Andy Sutton	New York Islanders

== Draft picks ==
Atlanta's picks at the 2007 NHL entry draft in Columbus, Ohio.

Round	#	Player	Position	Nationality	College/junior/club team (league)
3	67	Spencer Machacek	Right wing	Canada	Vancouver Giants (WHL)
4	115	Niclas Lucenius	Center	Finland	Tappara (Finland)
6	175	John Albert	Center	United States	U.S. National Team Development Program (NAHL)
7	205	Paul Postma	Defense	Canada	Swift Current Broncos (WHL)

Atlanta will pick third in the 2008 NHL entry draft, behind the Tampa Bay Lightning and Los Angeles Kings, after failing to move up in the draft lottery. The Thrashers will also have the first round pick from the Pittsburgh Penguins, received in the trade for Marian Hossa.

== Farm teams ==
=== American Hockey League ===
The Chicago Wolves are the Thrashers American Hockey League affiliate for the 2007–08 AHL season

=== ECHL ===
The Gwinnett Gladiators are the Thrashers ECHL affiliate.

== See also ==
- 2007–08 NHL season
