= Corbin McPherson =

American ice hockey player

- Born: September 7, 1988 (age 37) Folsom, California, U.S.
- Height: 6 ft 4 in (193 cm)
- Weight: 210 lb (95 kg; 15 st 0 lb)
- Position: Defense
- Shot: Right
- Played for: Albany Devils
- NHL draft: 87th overall, 2007; New Jersey Devils
- Playing career: 2012–2016

Corbin McPherson (born September 7, 1988) is an American former professional ice hockey defenseman. He played his entire professional career with the Albany Devils of the American Hockey League (AHL). McPherson was selected by the New Jersey Devils in the third round, 87th overall, of the 2007 NHL entry draft.

== Playing career ==
McPherson attended Colgate University where he played four seasons of NCAA Division I ice hockey with the Colgate Raiders. In his senior year he was named as one of the team's three captains for the 2011–12 season.

On March 20, 2012, the Albany Devils of the American Hockey League signed McPherson to an amateur tryout agreement. He played the next two seasons in Albany, posting a +16 rating to lead the team during the 2013–14 AHL season.

On July 4, 2014, the New Jersey Devils rewarded McPherson with his first NHL deal, agreeing on a one-year, two-way contract.

Following the 2015–16 season, McPherson announced his retirement from professional hockey after four seasons.

== Career statistics ==
			Regular season					Playoffs
Season	Team	League	GP	G	A	Pts	PIM	GP	G	A	Pts	PIM
2006–07	Cowichan Valley Capitals	BCHL	44	4	10	14	63	—	—	—	—	—
2007–08	Cowichan Valley Capitals	BCHL	55	3	14	17	84	—	—	—	—	—
2008–09	Colgate University	ECAC	37	0	5	5	50	—	—	—	—	—
2009–10	Colgate University	ECAC	35	2	6	8	20	—	—	—	—	—
2010–11	Colgate University	ECAC	41	4	6	10	36	—	—	—	—	—
2011–12	Colgate University	ECAC	39	4	6	10	28	—	—	—	—	—
2011–12	Albany Devils	AHL	9	0	1	1	2	—	—	—	—	—
2012–13	Albany Devils	AHL	72	2	5	7	43	—	—	—	—	—
2013–14	Albany Devils	AHL	69	0	10	10	41	4	0	0	0	6
2014–15	Albany Devils	AHL	73	1	8	9	68	—	—	—	—	—
2015–16	Albany Devils	AHL	64	2	6	8	38	4	0	2	2	2
AHL totals			287	5	30	35	192	8	0	2	2	8

== Awards and honours ==
Award	Year
College
ECAC All-Academic Team	2010, 2011, 2012
