= List of Florida Panthers award winners =

Florida Panthers awards
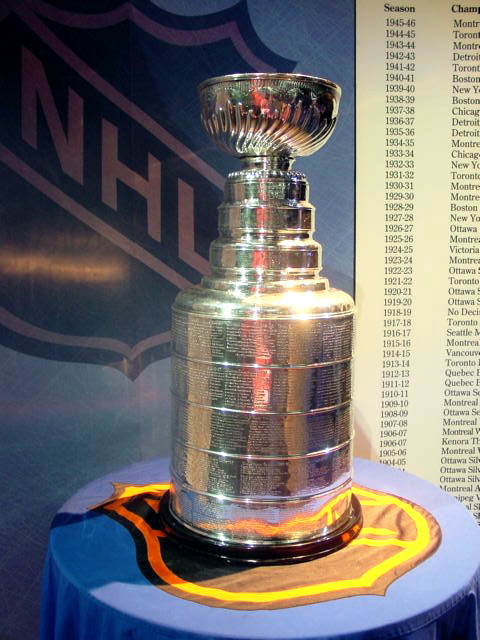
- The Florida Panthers have won the Stanley Cup (above) two times.

Team trophies
- Award*: Wins
- Stanley Cup: 2
- Prince of Wales Trophy: 4
- Presidents' Trophy: 1

Individual awards
- Award*: Wins
- Bill Masterton Memorial Trophy: 1
- Calder Memorial Trophy: 2
- Conn Smythe Trophy: 1
- Frank J. Selke Trophy: 3
- King Clancy Memorial Trophy: 1
- Lady Byng Memorial Trophy: 2
- Maurice "Rocket" Richard Trophy: 2

Total
- Awards won: 19

This is a list of Florida Panthers award winners.

== League awards ==
=== Team trophies ===
Team trophies awarded to the Florida Panthers
Award	Description	Times won	Seasons	References
Stanley Cup	NHL championship	2	2023–24, 2024–25	
Prince of Wales Trophy	Eastern Conference playoff championship	4	1995–96, 2022–23, 2023–24, 2024–25	
Presidents' Trophy	Most regular season points	1	2021–22	

=== Individual awards ===
Individual awards won by Florida Panthers players and staff
Award	Description	Winner	Season	References
Bill Masterton Memorial Trophy	Perseverance, sportsmanship and dedication to hockey	Jaromir Jagr	2015–16	
Calder Memorial Trophy	Rookie of the year	Jonathan Huberdeau	2012–13	
Calder Memorial Trophy	Rookie of the year	Aaron Ekblad	2014–15	
Conn Smythe Trophy	Most valuable player of the playoffs	Sam Bennett	2024–25	
Frank J. Selke Trophy	Forward who best excels in the defensive aspect of the game	Aleksander Barkov	2020–21	
Frank J. Selke Trophy	Forward who best excels in the defensive aspect of the game	Aleksander Barkov	2023–24	
Frank J. Selke Trophy	Forward who best excels in the defensive aspect of the game	Aleksander Barkov	2024–25	
King Clancy Memorial Trophy	Leadership qualities on and off the ice and humanitarian contributions within their community	Aleksander Barkov	2024–25	
Lady Byng Memorial Trophy	Gentlemanly conduct	Brian Campbell	2011–12	
Lady Byng Memorial Trophy	Gentlemanly conduct	Aleksander Barkov	2018–19	
Maurice "Rocket" Richard Trophy	Most goals in the regular season	Pavel Bure	1999–2000	
Maurice "Rocket" Richard Trophy	Most goals in the regular season	Pavel Bure	2000–01	

== All-Stars ==
=== NHL first and second team All-Stars ===
The NHL first and second team All-Stars are the top players at each position as voted on by the Professional Hockey Writers' Association.

Florida Panthers selected to the NHL First and Second Team All-Stars
Player	Position	Selections	Season	Team
Pavel Bure	Right wing	2	1999–2000	2nd
Pavel Bure	Right wing	2	2000–01	2nd
Jonathan Huberdeau	Left wing	2	2020–21	2nd
Jonathan Huberdeau	Left wing	2	2021–22	2nd
Roberto Luongo	Goaltender	1	2003–04	2nd
Matthew Tkachuk	Right wing	1	2022–23	2nd
John Vanbiesbrouck	Goaltender	1	1993–94	2nd

=== NHL All-Rookie Team ===
The NHL All-Rookie Team consists of the top rookies at each position as voted on by the Professional Hockey Writers' Association.

Florida Panthers selected to the NHL All-Rookie Team
Player	Position	Season
Jay Bouwmeester	Defense	2002–03
Aaron Ekblad	Defense	2014–15
Jonathan Huberdeau	Forward	2012–13
Kristian Huselius	Forward	2001–02
Ed Jovanovski	Defense	1995–96

=== All-Star Game selections ===
The National Hockey League All-Star Game is a mid-season exhibition game held annually between many of the top players of each season. Twenty All-Star Games have been held since the Panthers entered the league in 1993, with at least one player chosen to represent the Panthers in each year except 1998 and 2011. The All-Star game has not been held in various years: 1979 and 1987 due to the 1979 Challenge Cup and Rendez-vous '87 series between the NHL and the Soviet national team, respectively, 1995, 2005, and 2013 as a result of labor stoppages, 2006, 2010, 2014 and 2026 because of the Winter Olympic Games, 2021 as a result of the COVID-19 pandemic, and 2025 when it was replaced by the 2025 4 Nations Face-Off. Florida has hosted one of the games. The 53rd and 67th both took place at the Amerant Bank Arena.

- † Selected by fan vote
- ↑ All-Star Game Most Valuable Player

Florida Panthers players and coaches selected to the All-Star Game
Game	Year	Name	Position	References
45th	1994	Bob Kudelski	Right wing	
45th	1994	John Vanbiesbrouck	Goaltender	
46th	1996	Doug MacLean	Coach	
46th	1996	Scott Mellanby	Right wing	
46th	1996	John Vanbiesbrouck	Goaltender	
47th	1997	Doug MacLean	Coach	
47th	1997	Robert Svehla	Defense	
47th	1997	John Vanbiesbrouck†	Goaltender	
48th	1998	No Panthers selected	—	
49th	1999	Viktor Kozlov (Did not play)	Center	
50th	2000	Pavel Bure↑	Right wing	
50th	2000	Viktor Kozlov	Center	
50th	2000	Ray Whitney	Left wing	
51st	2001	Pavel Bure†	Right wing	
52nd	2002	Sandis Ozolinsh†	Defense	
53rd	2003	Olli Jokinen	Center	
53rd	2003	Sandis Ozolinsh† (Note: Ozolinsh was chosen as a member of the Panthers but was traded to the Mighty Ducks of Anaheim two nights before the game. The public address announcement was said: "From your Florida Panthers but now playing for the Mighty Ducks of Anaheim, #8 Sandis Ozolinsh!!.)	Defense	
54th	2004	Roberto Luongo	Goaltender	
55th	2007	Jay Bouwmeester	Defense	
56th	2008	Tomas Vokoun	Goaltender	
57th	2009	Jay Bouwmeester	Defense	
58th	2011	No Panthers selected	—	
59th	2012	Brian Campbell	Defense	
60th	2015	Aaron Ekblad	Defense	
60th	2015	Roberto Luongo	Goaltender	
61st	2016	Aaron Ekblad	Defense	
61st	2016	Gerard Gallant	Coach	
61st	2016	Jaromir Jagr†	Right wing	
61st	2016	Roberto Luongo	Goaltender	
62nd	2017	Vincent Trocheck	Center	
63rd	2018	Aleksander Barkov	Center	
64th	2019	Keith Yandle	Defense	
65th	2020	Jonathan Huberdeau	Center	
66th	2022	Andrew Brunette	Coach	
66th	2022	Jonathan Huberdeau	Center	
67th	2023	Aleksander Barkov (Replaced Auston Matthews)	Center	
67th	2023	Matthew Tkachuk↑	Left wing	
68th	2024	Sergei Bobrovsky†	Goaltender	
68th	2024	Sam Reinhart	Center	

=== All-Star Game replacement events ===
Florida Panthers players and coaches selected to All-Star Game replacement events
Event	Year	Name	Position	References
4 Nations Face-Off	2025	Aleksander Barkov (Finland)	Center	
4 Nations Face-Off	2025	Sam Bennett (Canada)	Center	
4 Nations Face-Off	2025	Gustav Forsling (Sweden)	Defense	
4 Nations Face-Off	2025	Anton Lundell (Finland)	Center	
4 Nations Face-Off	2025	Eetu Luostarinen (Finland)	Center	
4 Nations Face-Off	2025	Niko Mikkola (Finland)	Defense	
4 Nations Face-Off	2025	Sam Reinhart (Canada)	Center	
4 Nations Face-Off	2025	Matthew Tkachuk (United States)	Left wing	

== Career achievements ==
=== Hockey Hall of Fame ===
The following is a list of Florida Panthers who have been enshrined in the Hockey Hall of Fame.

Florida Panthers inducted into the Hockey Hall of Fame
Individual	Category	Year inducted	Years with Panthers in category	References
Ed Belfour	Player	2011	2006–2007	
Pavel Bure	Player	2012	1999–2002	
Dino Ciccarelli	Player	2010	1998–1999	
Igor Larionov	Player	2008	1998–1999	
Roberto Luongo	Player	2022	2000–2006, 2014–2019	
Roger Neilson	Builder	2002	1993–1995	
Joe Nieuwendyk	Player	2011	2005–2006	
Joe Thornton	Player	2025	2021–2022	
Bill Torrey	Builder	1995	1993–2001	
Mike Vernon	Player	2023	2000	

=== Foster Hewitt Memorial Award ===
One member of the Panthers organization has been honored with the Foster Hewitt Memorial Award. The award is presented by the Hockey Hall of Fame to members of the radio and television industry who make outstanding contributions to their profession and the game of ice hockey during their broadcasting career.

Members of the Florida Panthers honored with the Foster Hewitt Memorial Award
Individual	Year honored	Years with Panthers as broadcaster	References
Dave Strader	2017	2005–2007	

=== United States Hockey Hall of Fame ===
Members of the Florida Panthers inducted into the United States Hockey Hall of Fame
Individual	Year inducted	Years with Panthers	References
Tim Thomas	2019	2013–2014	
John Vanbiesbrouck	2007	1993–1998	

=== Retired numbers ===
The Florida Panthers have retired three of their jersey numbers. The number 93 was retired for Bill Torrey, who was President of the team from 1993 through 2001, and the number 37 was retired for Wayne Huizenga, who was owner of the team from 1993 through 2001. Also out of circulation is the number 99 which was retired league-wide for Wayne Gretzky on February 6, 2000. Gretzky did not play for the Panthers during his 20-year NHL career and no Panthers player had ever worn the number 99 prior to its retirement.

Florida Panthers retired numbers
Number	Player	Position	Years with Panthers as a player	Date of retirement ceremony	References
1	Roberto Luongo	Goaltender	2000–2006, 2014–2019	March 7, 2020	
37	Wayne Huizenga	—	N/A	January 19, 2018	
93	Bill Torrey	—	N/A	October 23, 2010	

== Other awards ==
Florida Panthers who have received non-NHL awards
Award	Description	Winner	Season	References
Golden Hockey Stick	Best Czech ice hockey player	Tomas Vokoun	2009–10	
Golden Hockey Stick	Best Czech ice hockey player	Jaromir Jagr	2015–16	

== See also ==
- List of National Hockey League awards
