= Duncan Keith =

Canadian ice hockey player (born 1983)

- Hockey Hall of Fame, 2025
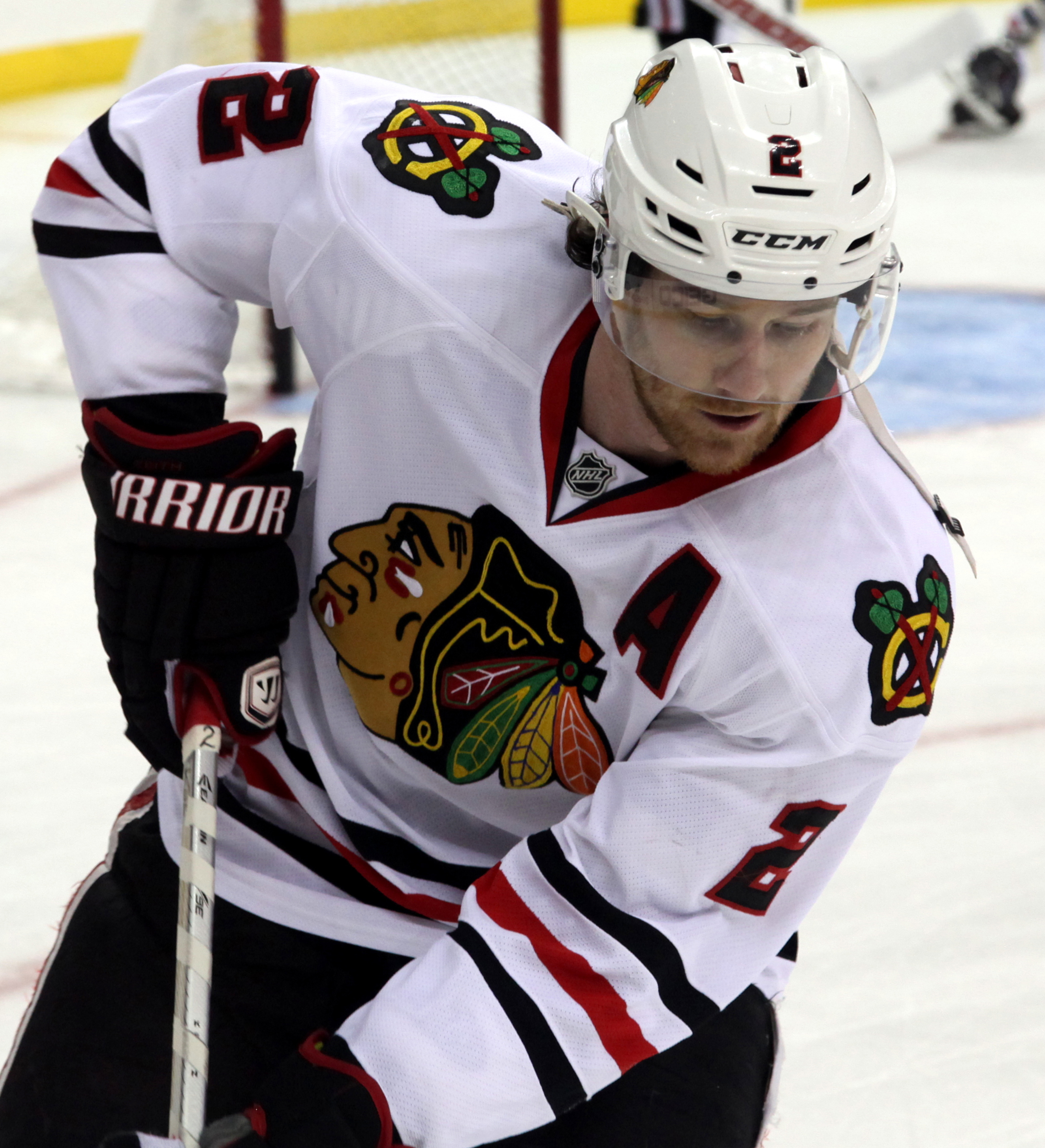
- Keith with the Chicago Blackhawks in December 2014
- Born: July 16, 1983 (age 43) Winnipeg, Manitoba, Canada
- Height: 6 ft 1 in (185 cm)
- Weight: 192 lb (87 kg; 13 st 10 lb)
- Position: Defence
- Shot: Left
- Played for: Chicago Blackhawks; Edmonton Oilers
- National team: Canada
- NHL draft: 54th overall, 2002; Chicago Blackhawks
- Playing career: 2003–2022
- Website: DuncanKeith.com

Duncan Keith (born July 16, 1983) is a Canadian former professional ice hockey defenceman who played 17 seasons in the National Hockey League for the Chicago Blackhawks and Edmonton Oilers. He won three Stanley Cup championships with Chicago in 2010, 2013, and 2015. In 2017, Keith was named one of the 100 Greatest NHL Players in history.

Following his freshman year at Michigan State University, Keith was selected in the second round, 54th overall, by Chicago in the 2002 NHL entry draft. After splitting the next year between Michigan State and the Kelowna Rockets of the Western Hockey League (WHL), he spent two seasons with the Norfolk Admirals of the American Hockey League (AHL). In 2005–06, he played his NHL rookie season with the Blackhawks. Four years later, he won the James Norris Memorial Trophy as the NHL's best defenceman. He won a second Norris in 2014 and received the Conn Smythe Trophy as the most valuable player of the 2015 Stanley Cup playoffs by a unanimous vote.

Keith was known as a two-way defenceman, capable in both shutdown and offensive roles. He is a two-time gold medallist in international competition, having appeared with Team Canada at the 2010 Vancouver and 2014 Sochi Winter Olympics. Keith was inducted into the Hockey Hall of Fame in 2025.

== Early life ==
Keith is the middle child of Dave and Jean Keith; older brother Cameron (born in 1981) and younger sister Rebecca (born in 1984). His father was in Winnipeg working at the local Canadian Imperial Bank of Commerce (CIBC) branch when he transferred to Fort Frances, Ontario, in 1985 for an assistant manager position. Keith's mother worked in the health field at Rainycrest Home for the Aged in Fort Frances.

Keith grew up as a Boston Bruins fan, singling-out defenceman Ray Bourque and forward Cam Neely as his favourite players, as well as Wayne Gretzky. Keith played minor hockey in the Fort Frances Minor Hockey Association along with his brother. Initially beginning as a forward with the Fort Frances Times Tigers, he has recalled switching to defence at the age of eight or nine. He went on to play AA Atom with Pinewood Sports and Marine Ltd and PeeWee with the Knights of Columbus. After Keith established himself in the NHL, the town of Fort Frances recognized his success by declaring July 21, 2008, "Duncan Keith Day."

While Keith began to be recruited for AAA Bantam in Thunder Bay, Ontario, his father obtained a managerial position at a CIBC branch in Summerland, British Columbia. At age 15, his family moved to nearby Penticton, where he finished his last two years of minor hockey. He then earned a spot on the local Junior A team, the Penticton Panthers of the British Columbia Hockey League (BCHL), as a 16-year-old.

== Playing career ==
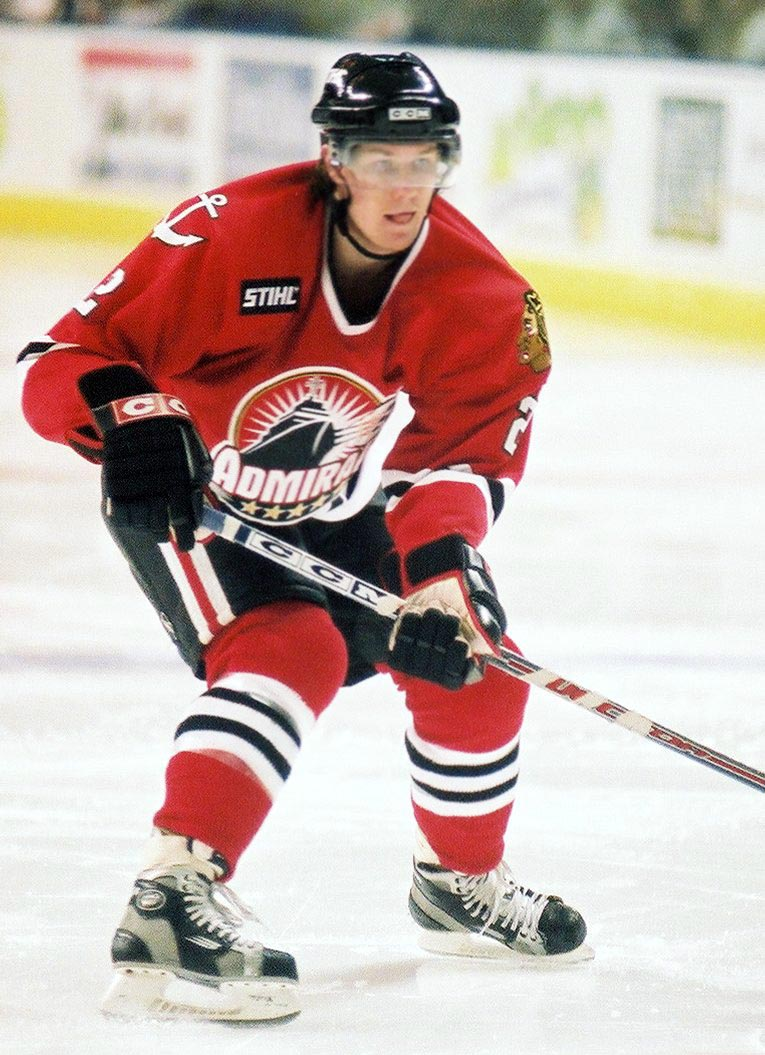
Keith during his stint with the Norfolk Admirals in 2011

=== Junior/collegiate ===
Keith played three years for the Penticton Panthers from 1999–00 through 2000–01, scoring 78 goals and 148 assists for 226 points in 163 games. He was recruited by Michigan State University and played college hockey there for two years with the Michigan State Spartans of the Central Collegiate Hockey Association (CCHA). He scored a goal in his Spartans debut in the Cold War, an outdoor game at Spartan Stadium against the state-rival University of Michigan Wolverines on October 6, 2001, the game set a record for attendance at their hockey games. He completed his freshman year with 3 goals and 15 points in 41 games, ranked fourth among team defencemen behind John-Michael Liles, Brad Fast and Andrew Hutchinson. During Keith's second college season, he left the Spartans after 15 games to join the major junior ranks. He returned to British Columbia to play for the Kelowna Rockets of the Western Hockey League (WHL) and amassed 46 points (11 goals and 35 assists) over 37 regular season games with a +32 plus-minus in his single season there. He also added 14 points in 19 playoff games.

=== Professional (2005–2022) ===
==== Chicago Blackhawks (2005–2021) ====
Keith was selected by the Chicago Blackhawks in the second round, 54th overall, of the 2002 NHL entry draft. He signed with Chicago prior to the 2003–04 season and spent his first two seasons after junior in the American Hockey League (AHL) with the team affiliate Norfolk Admirals. He recorded seven goals and 25 points over 75 games in his professional rookie season in 2003–04. Keith's chances of earning a spot with the Blackhawks the following season were eliminated due to the 2004–05 NHL lock-out. Remaining with the Admirals, he continued his pace with 26 points in 79 games.

Following two seasons in the AHL, Keith made the Blackhawks squad out of the 2005 training camp. He played in his first NHL game on October 5, 2005, against the Mighty Ducks of Anaheim. He made an immediate impact on the club, scoring nine goals and 12 assists for 21 points, while averaging over 23 minutes of ice time in 81 games during his 2005–06 NHL rookie season. The Blackhawks re-signed him in the off-season to a four-year contract extension.

In 2006–07, he played in all 82 games for the Blackhawks and once again led the team in average ice time at 23 minutes. He had two goals and 29 assists for 31 points while leading the team in blocked shots with 148.

For the 2007–08 season, Keith saw even more ice time as injuries wracked the Blackhawks' defensive corps. He began the season on the top-defensive pairing with Brent Seabrook. By mid-January, he was averaging 24:31 minutes of ice time and had a team leading plus-minus of +14. He was rewarded for this effort by a selection to his first NHL All-Star Game in 2008. Keith went on to finish the season with 12 goals and 20 assists for 32 points, along with a +30 plus-minus rating, despite being on a non-playoff team.

On October 8, 2008, Keith was named an alternate captain along with forward Patrick Sharp to the start the 2008–09 season. He helped a rejuvenated Blackhawks team, led by second-year forwards Jonathan Toews and Patrick Kane, back into the Stanley Cup playoffs, recording 8 goals and 44 points, second among team defencemen to Brian Campbell. He added 6 points in 17 playoff games as the Blackhawks advanced to the Western Conference Finals, where they were eliminated by Central Division rivals, the defending Stanley Cup champion Detroit Red Wings.

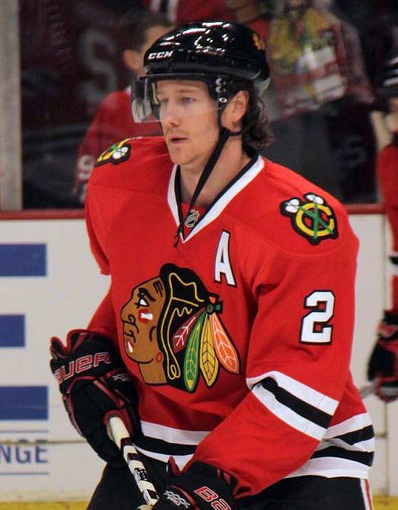
Keith with the Blackhawks in February 2011. He was appointed as an alternate captain in October 2008, and had held that position with the team until being traded in July 2021.

With Keith having established himself with Seabrook as one of the top shutdown pairings in the league, he made significant offensive improvement in 2009–10. On December 3, 2009, the Blackhawks announced having extended Keith's contract simultaneously with Jonathan Toews and Patrick Kane. At $72 million over 13 years, Keith's contract was the most lucrative in team history, surpassing Marián Hossa's 12-year, $62.8 million contract signed several months prior in July 2009. He completed the season with 14 goals and 55 assists for 69 points in all 82 contests, ranked second among league defencemen behind Mike Green of the Washington Capitals. It was also the highest total for a Blackhawks defenceman since Chris Chelios' 72-point season in 1995–96. His 26:35 minutes of average ice time was the second highest in the league. Entering the 2010 playoffs as the second seed in the Western Conference, the Blackhawks eliminated the Nashville Predators, Vancouver Canucks and San Jose Sharks in the first three rounds. During game four of the Western Conference Finals against the Sharks on May 23, 2010, Keith had seven teeth knocked out by a puck on a clearing attempt by Sharks' forward Patrick Marleau. He returned minutes after the incident to help the Blackhawks complete a four-game sweep of the Sharks and advance to the Stanley Cup Final for the first time since 1992. Matched against the Philadelphia Flyers, they won the Stanley Cup in six games for the Blackhawks first Stanley Cup championship since 1961. Keith finished the post-season with 17 points (two goals and 15 assists) over all 22 contests. Nominated for the James Norris Memorial Trophy for his regular season performance, he outvoted Mike Green and Drew Doughty of the Los Angeles Kings to earn the award as the NHL's best defenceman in the off-season.

In the 2010–11 season, Chicago barely qualified for the 2011 playoffs as the eighth and final seed in the West just two points ahead of the Dallas Stars. Keith's individual production decreased to seven goals and 38 assists 45 points over all 82 games for a second straight season. Facing the Presidents' Trophy-winning Vancouver Canucks in the first round of the playoffs, the defending Stanley Cup champion Blackhawks were eliminated in seven games. Keith recorded four goals and two assists in all seven games during the series.

On March 23, 2012, Keith was suspended five games for delivering an elbow to the head of Vancouver Canucks forward Daniel Sedin. Head of the Department of Player Safety Brendan Shanahan observed that the hit was "dangerous, reckless, and caused injury" in his video release.

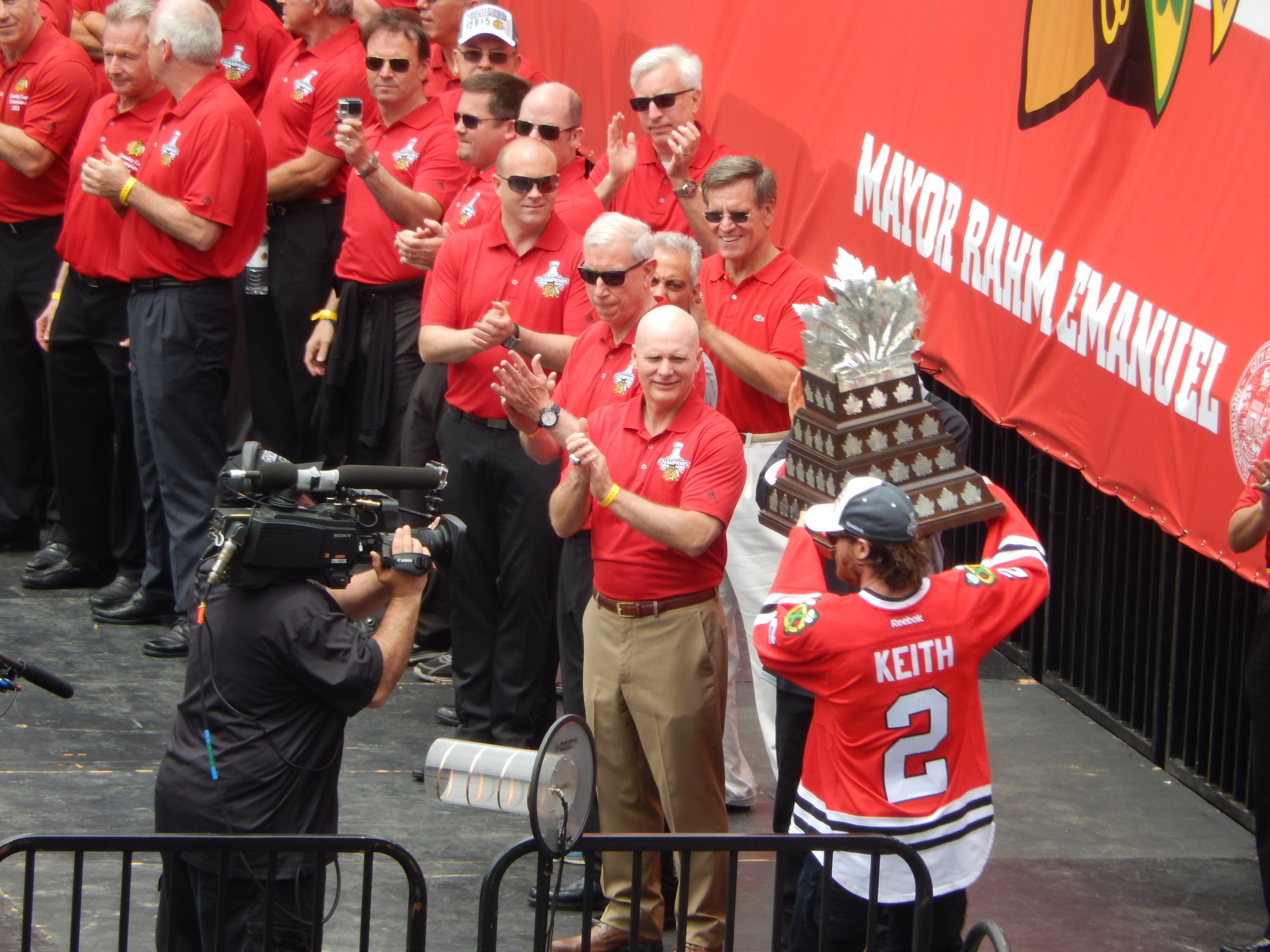
Keith with the Conn Smythe Trophy in June 2015.

On June 4, 2013, Keith received a one-game suspension for a slash to the face of Los Angeles Kings' forward Jeff Carter during Game 3 of the Western Conference Finals. The league, in announcing the suspension, referred to the slash as "a one handed upward swing" which struck Carter directly in the face causing a laceration which required 20 stitches to close. After defeating the defending Stanley Cup champion Kings in five games in the Western Conference Finals, Keith and the Blackhawks defeated the Boston Bruins in six games in the Stanley Cup Final and Keith assisted on the late game tying goal by Bryan Bickell in game six before Dave Bolland scored the series clinching goal moments later.

In the following season, Keith tallied six goals and 55 assists while maintaining a +22 plus-minus rating over 79 games. He was with gold-medallist Team Canada at the 2014 Sochi Winter Olympics. Keith recorded four goals and seven assists in the 2014 playoffs, but lost to Los Angeles Kings in the Western Conference Finals, the eventual champions. After the season's conclusion, Keith was awarded his second Norris Trophy as the NHL's top defenceman.

On June 15, 2015, Keith won his third Stanley Cup with the Blackhawks. His 2015 playoffs performance resulted in the Conn Smythe Trophy for playoffs MVP, after scoring the winning goal on Tampa Bay Lightning goaltender Ben Bishop. He joins Henrik Zetterberg in having achieved scoring the Cup-winning goal and receiving the Conn Smythe Trophy in the same year in 2008.

On March 29, 2016, Keith was checked to the ice by Minnesota Wild forward Charlie Coyle and retaliated with his stick—Coyle required medical attention having blood dripping from his nose. Keith was given a match penalty for intent to injure. A review would lead to his suspension from the last five games of the regular season and the first game of the 2016 playoffs – causing Keith to forfeit $148,883.35 in salary under the terms of the NHL collective bargaining agreement.

On December 11, 2018, Keith and teammate Brent Seabrook became the first pair of defencemen, and the seventh duo in NHL history, to play 1,000 games together.

On November 29, 2019, in a 5–2 loss to the Colorado Avalanche, Keith sustained a groin injury while trying to back check against Avalanchhe' forward Valeri Nichushkin, causing him to miss the next nine games.

On May 6, 2021, Keith sustained a concussion as a result of his head being smacked by the knee of linesman Ryan Gibbons in a 2–1 OT win over the Carolina Hurricanes, causing him to miss the final two games of the COVID-19 pandemic-shortened 2020–21 season

==== Edmonton Oilers (2021–2022) ====
In late-June 2021, it was reported that Keith had requested a trade from the Blackhawks to Western Canada or the Pacific Northwest of the United States to be closer to his family (who live in Penticton, British Columbia) as he finished out his career. On July 12, Keith's sixteen season run with the Blackhawks came to an end when he, along with Tim Söderlund, were traded to the Edmonton Oilers in exchange for Caleb Jones and a conditional third-round pick in 2022. Keith left the Chicago organisation holding numerous distinctions, including the second most games played in team uniform, second most points by a blueliner (behind only Doug Wilson) and having led the team in ice time for every season he played. Oilers general manager Ken Holland's decision to trade for Keith was controversial, with many faulting the decision to agree to the trade without Chicago retaining any portion of Keith's salary against the salary cap. At the time of the trade, a number of analytical models rated Keith as one of the worst defencemen in the NHL from the previous abbreviated season.

On February 9, 2022, in a 4–1 loss to his former team, the Chicago Blackhawks, Keith sustained a concussion as he lost his footing and slid into the boards, resulting in him missing the next nine games. Despite the skepticism from media prior to the season starting, Keith was generally regarded as having performed solidly in his debut season in Edmonton, recording one goal and 20 assists for 21 points in 64 games played, largely on the second pair. He spent much of the second half of the season partnered with Evan Bouchard, who credited him as a valuable mentor. The Oilers finished the season second in the Pacific Division, advancing into the 2022 playoffs. The team defeated the Los Angeles Kings and the Calgary Flames in the first two rounds, meeting the top seeded and eventual Stanley Cup Champion Colorado Avalanche in the Western Conference Finals before being defeated in a four game sweep.

Following the end of the season, the Oilers reportedly asked Keith to clarify by July 1, 2022, whether he intended to play another season or retire. Keith officially announced his retirement on July 12.

== Post-playing career ==
The Edmonton Oilers hired Keith as a player development consultant on October 14, 2022.

== International play ==
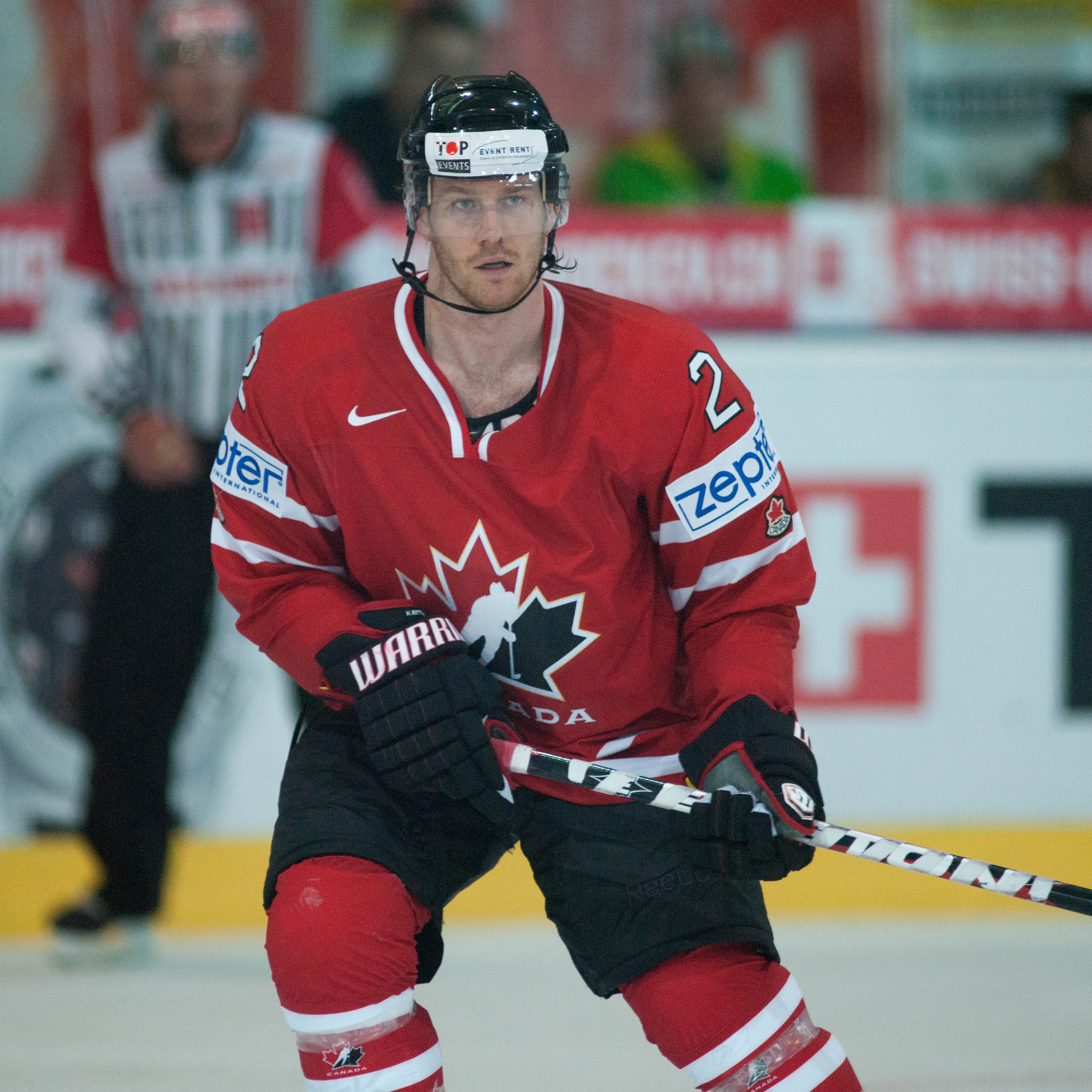
- Keith playing for Team Canada in 2012

Medal record

Representing Canada

Ice hockey

Olympic Games
Gold medal – first place	2010 Vancouver	
Gold medal – first place	2014 Sochi	

World Championships
Silver medal – second place	2008 Canada	

Keith debuted internationally for Canada at the 2008 IIHF World Championship. He contributed two assists in nine games as Canada won a silver medal, losing in the gold medal game to Russia.

On December 30, 2009, Keith was selected to play for Canada at the 2010 Winter Olympics in Vancouver. He was named to the squad along with Blackhawks teammates Brent Seabrook and Jonathan Toews. Although Keith was expected to retain Seabrook as his defensive partner from the NHL to Canada, Seabrook ended up as the designated seventh defenceman while Keith formed a pairing with Drew Doughty. Keith finished the tournament with six assists, leading Canada in ice time, as Canada won the gold medal over the United States 3–2 in overtime on February 28, 2010. It was Keith's first international gold medal.

Keith also played on Canada's gold medal-winning team at the Ice hockey at the 2014 Winter Olympics – Men's tournament in Sochi.

== Personal life ==
Keith and his ex-wife Kelly-Rae have one son, who was born on May 8, 2013.

On February 25, 2014, Keith, along with Blackhawks teammate Brent Seabrook, made a cameo appearance on the NBC drama Chicago Fire.

== Career statistics ==
=== Regular season and playoffs ===
Bold indicates led league

			Regular season					Playoffs
Season	Team	League	GP	G	A	Pts	PIM	GP	G	A	Pts	PIM
1999–00	Penticton Panthers	BCHL	59	9	27	36	37	—	—	—	—	—
2000–01	Penticton Panthers	BCHL	60	18	64	82	61	—	—	—	—	—
2001–02	Michigan State University	CCHA	41	3	12	15	18	—	—	—	—	—
2002–03	Michigan State University	CCHA	15	3	6	9	8	—	—	—	—	—
2002–03	Kelowna Rockets	WHL	37	11	35	46	60	19	3	11	14	12
2003–04	Norfolk Admirals	AHL	75	7	18	25	44	8	1	1	2	6
2004–05	Norfolk Admirals	AHL	79	9	17	26	78	6	0	0	0	14
2005–06	Chicago Blackhawks	NHL	81	9	12	21	79	—	—	—	—	—
2006–07	Chicago Blackhawks	NHL	82	2	29	31	76	—	—	—	—	—
2007–08	Chicago Blackhawks	NHL	82	12	20	32	56	—	—	—	—	—
2008–09	Chicago Blackhawks	NHL	77	8	36	44	60	17	0	6	6	10
2009–10	Chicago Blackhawks	NHL	82	14	55	69	51	22	2	15	17	10
2010–11	Chicago Blackhawks	NHL	82	7	38	45	22	7	4	2	6	6
2011–12	Chicago Blackhawks	NHL	74	4	36	40	42	6	0	1	1	2
2012–13	Chicago Blackhawks	NHL	47	3	24	27	31	22	2	11	13	18
2013–14	Chicago Blackhawks	NHL	79	6	55	61	28	19	4	7	11	8
2014–15	Chicago Blackhawks	NHL	80	10	35	45	20	23	3	**18**	21	4
2015–16	Chicago Blackhawks	NHL	67	9	34	43	26	6	3	2	5	2
2016–17	Chicago Blackhawks	NHL	80	6	47	53	16	4	0	1	1	2
2017–18	Chicago Blackhawks	NHL	82	2	30	32	28	—	—	—	—	—
2018–19	Chicago Blackhawks	NHL	82	6	34	40	70	—	—	—	—	—
2019–20	Chicago Blackhawks	NHL	61	3	24	27	18	9	0	5	5	4
2020–21	Chicago Blackhawks	NHL	54	4	11	15	30	—	—	—	—	—
2021–22	Edmonton Oilers	NHL	64	1	20	21	22	16	1	4	5	4
NHL totals			1,256	106	540	646	675	151	19	72	91	70

=== International ===
Year	Team	Event	Result	GP	G	A	Pts	PIM
2000	Canada Pacific	U17	3rd place, bronze medalist(s)	6	1	3	4	0
2008	Canada	WC	2nd place, silver medalist(s)	9	0	2	2	6
2010	Canada	OG	1st place, gold medalist(s)	7	0	6	6	2
2012	Canada	WC	5th	8	1	10	11	0
2014	Canada	OG	1st place, gold medalist(s)	6	0	1	1	4
Junior totals				6	1	3	4	0
Senior totals				30	1	19	20	12

== Awards ==
Award	Year
NHL All-Star Game	2008, 2011, 2015, 2017
Stanley Cup champion	2010, 2013, 2015
James Norris Memorial Trophy	2010, 2014
NHL first All-Star team	2010, 2014
Conn Smythe Trophy	2015
NHL second All-Star team	2017
NHL All-Decade 1st Team	2010s

Awards and achievements
Preceded by Zdeno Chára; P. K. Subban	James Norris Memorial Trophy winner 2010; 2014	Succeeded by Nicklas Lidström; Erik Karlsson
Preceded by Justin Williams	Conn Smythe Trophy winner 2015	Succeeded by Sidney Crosby
