= 1994 National Hockey League All-Star Game =

Professional ice hockey exhibition game

1994 NHL All-Star Game
	1	2	3	Total
West	4	2	2	8
East	3	2	4	9
- Date: January 22, 1994
- Arena: Madison Square Garden
- City: New York City
- MVP: Mike Richter (NY Rangers)
- Attendance: 18,200

The 1994 National Hockey League All-Star Game was held in Madison Square Garden in New York City, home of the New York Rangers, on January 22, 1994.

It was the 45th All-Star Game held in NHL history, and the first to be rebranded under the year the game was held rather than the edition title.

== Super Skills Competition ==
The Western Conference would win the Skills Competition for the second straight season. In the individual events Al Iafrate won the "Hardest Shot" event for the second straight season, while both John Vanbiesbrouck and Patrick Roy would share the Goaltenders Competition victory. In addition, the "Puck Control Relay" event would be introduced as part of the individual competition with its first winner being Russ Courtnall.

=== Individual event winners ===
- Puck Control Relay – Russ Courtnall (Dallas Stars)
- Fastest Skater – Sergei Fedorov (Detroit Red Wings) – 13.525 seconds
- Accuracy Shooting - Brendan Shanahan (St. Louis Blues) – 4 hits, 5 shots
- Hardest Shot – Al Iafrate (Washington Capitals) – 102.7 mph
- Goaltenders Competition – John Vanbiesbrouck (Florida Panthers)/Patrick Roy (Montreal Canadiens) – 4 GA, 16 shots

== The game ==
A capacity crowd saw Ottawa Senators' rookie Alexei Yashin score with 3:42 left in the third period, to give the Eastern Conference a 9–8 victory. The Western Conference were leading 8–6 in the third period, until Quebec Nordiques' centre Joe Sakic scored his first All-Star Game goal to cut the lead to 8–7. Florida Panthers' centre Bob Kudelski then scored with 6:01 left to tie the game at 8–8, before Yashin would score the eventual game-winner. New York Rangers' goaltender Mike Richter was named All-Star MVP after he saved 19 of 21 shots in the second period, including three saves on breakaways by sniper Pavel Bure. Kudelski was added onto the Eastern Conference lineup due to injuries to Mario Lemieux, who along with Ed Belfour were the highest-profile players among the several players on the rosters who were unable to play due to injury. (Curtis Joseph was the only injured player who played in this game.)

Other first time All-Stars in New York included all three Western Conference goaltenders—the Toronto Maple Leafs' Felix Potvin (who started in place of Ed Belfour), the San Jose Sharks' Arturs Irbe and the Blues' Curtis Joseph (the game's losing goaltender, who gave up the winning goal in the third period). This was the most recent All-Star Game in which the head coaches were also the head coaches of the defending conference champions (Barry Melrose was the Western Conference's head coach and Jacques Demers was the Eastern Conference's head coach).

=== Uniforms ===
The 1994 All-Star Game saw the most radical departure from All-Star uniform design since the star-laden 1982 All-Star Game uniforms. The NHL retired the use of its league colors of black and orange, and had the uniforms designed based on the new Eastern and Western Conference logos. Both uniforms featured a giant star-based pattern across the entirety of the uniform, utilizing a dye-sublimation process that had been piloted in the National Basketball Association. The Eastern team's jersey featured a teal star pattern over a white base, while the Western team wore purple over a black base. Silver trim (along with the reverse of the base color) separated the star pattern from the base. The respective conference logos appeared on the front, replacing the NHL shield.

The NHL All-Star shield, an orange version of the NHL logo with five black sticks forming the outline of a white star, had been worn on the left shoulder of the uniform since 1983. The patch was retired for this game, replaced with a patch featuring each player's individual team logo.

This uniform design would continue to be used through the 1997 All-Star Game, with one minor change - the names and sleeve numbers on the Eastern jerseys would be changed from black to white. These uniforms would also provide the inspiration for the Dallas Stars to redesign their uniforms later in the decade, introducing their green version as a third jersey in 1997 and adding a white version in 1999.

=== Summary ===
	Western Conference	Eastern Conference
Final score	8	9
Scoring summary	Roenick (Nieuwendyk, Blake), 7:31 1st; Fedorov (Bure, Ozolinsh), 10:20 1st; Shanahan (Gretzky, Hull), 13:21 1st; Andreychuk (MacInnis, Fedorov), 15:10 1st; Coffey (Andreychuk, Gilmour), 12:36 2nd; Ozolinsh (Taylor, Roenick), 14:39 2nd; Ozolinsh (Bure), 0:55 3rd; Shanahan (Gretzky, Chelios), 7:40 3rd	Kudelski (Turgeon, Bourque), 9:46 1st; Lindros (unassisted), 11:00 1st; Yashin (Sakic, Turgeon), 14:29 1st; Stevens (Oates, Sanderson), 10:37 2nd; Messier (Mullen, Graves), 15:05 2nd; Mullen (Graves, Messier), 1:28 3rd; Sakic (Turgeon, Stevens), 10:41 3rd; Kudelski (Messier), 13:59 3rd; Yashin (Sakic, Turgeon), 16:18 3rd (GWG)
Penalties	none	none
Shots on goal	17–21–8–46	19–18–19–56
Win/loss	L - Curtis Joseph	W - John Vanbiesbrouck

- Referee: Bill McCreary
- Linesmen: Gord Broseker, Pat Dapuzzo
- Television: NBC, CBC

== Rosters ==
	Western Conference	Eastern Conference
Final score	8	9
Head coach	(Canada) Barry Melrose (Los Angeles Kings)	(Canada) Jacques Demers (Montreal Canadiens)
Assistant coach		
Trainer	Jim Ramsay (Winnipeg Jets)	Joe Murphy (New York Rangers) Dave Smith (New York Rangers)
Honorary captain	(Canada) Gordie Howe	(Canada) Rod Gilbert
Lineup	Starting lineup: (United States) 7 - D Chris Chelios (Chicago Blackhawks), Alternate; (Canada) 77 - D Paul Coffey (Detroit Red Wings), Alternate; (Russia) 10 - RW Pavel Bure (Vancouver Canucks); (United States) 16 - RW Brett Hull (St. Louis Blues); (Canada) 29 - G Felix Potvin (Toronto Maple Leafs); (Canada) 99 - C Wayne Gretzky (Los Angeles Kings), Captain; Commissioner's selection: (Canada) 18 - RW Dave Taylor (Los Angeles Kings), Alternate; Reserves: (Canada) 2 - D Al MacInnis (Calgary Flames); (Canada) 4 - D Rob Blake (Los Angeles Kings); (Russia) 5 - D Alexei Kasatonov (Mighty Ducks of Anaheim); (Latvia) 6 - D Sandis Ozolinsh (San Jose Sharks); (Canada) 9 - LW Shayne Corson (Edmonton Oilers); (Finland) 13 - RW Teemu Selanne (Winnipeg Jets); (Canada) 14 - LW Dave Andreychuk (Toronto Maple Leafs); (Canada) 19 - LW Brendan Shanahan (St. Louis Blues); (Canada) 25 - C Joe Nieuwendyk (Calgary Flames); (Canada) 26 - RW Russ Courtnall (Dallas Stars); (United States) 27 - C Jeremy Roenick (Chicago Blackhawks); (Canada) 31 - G Curtis Joseph (St. Louis Blues); (Latvia) 32 - G Arturs Irbe (San Jose Sharks); (Russia) 91 - C Sergei Fedorov (Detroit Red Wings); (Canada) 93 - C Doug Gilmour (Toronto Maple Leafs)	Starting lineup: (United States) 2 - D Brian Leetch (New York Rangers); (Canada) 11 - C Mark Messier (New York Rangers), Captain (Note: Jaromir Jagr was voted as a starter, but was not able to play due to injury. Mark Messier was his replacement in the starting lineup.)t; (Canada) 33 - G Patrick Roy (Montreal Canadiens); (Canada) 77 - D Ray Bourque (Boston Bruins), Alternate; (Canada) 88 - C Eric Lindros (Philadelphia Flyers); (Russia) 89 - RW Alexander Mogilny (Buffalo Sabres); Commissioner's selection: (United States) 7 - RW Joe Mullen (Pittsburgh Penguins) (Note: Mark Howe was originally selected by the commissioner, but was not able to play due to injury. Joe Mullen was his replacement.); Reserves: (Canada) 3 - D Garry Galley (Philadelphia Flyers); (Canada) 4 - D Scott Stevens (New Jersey Devils); (Canada) 8 - RW Mark Recchi (Philadelphia Flyers); (Canada) 9 - LW Adam Graves (New York Rangers); (Canada) 10 - LW Geoff Sanderson (Hartford Whalers); (Canada) 12 - C Adam Oates (Boston Bruins); (Canada) 17 - C Pierre Turgeon (New York Islanders); (Canada) 18 - C Joe Sakic (Quebec Nordiques); (Canada) 19 - C Brian Bradley (Tampa Bay Lightning); (United States) 34 - D Al Iafrate (Washington Capitals); (Russia) 20 - C Alexei Yashin (Ottawa Senators); (United States) 22 - C Bob Kudelski (Florida Panthers); (Canada) 55 - D Larry Murphy (Pittsburgh Penguins), Alternate; (United States) 34 - G John Vanbiesbrouck (Florida Panthers); (United States) 35 - G Mike Richter (New York Rangers)

== See also ==
- 1993–94 NHL season
