= 2007–08 NHL season =

National Hockey League season

- League: National Hockey League
- Sport: Ice hockey
- Duration: September 29, 2007 – June 4, 2008
- Games: 82
- Teams: 30
- TV partner(s): CBC, TSN, RDS (Canada); Versus, NBC (United States)

Draft
- Top draft pick: Patrick Kane
- Picked by: Chicago Blackhawks

Regular season
- Presidents' Trophy: Detroit Red Wings
- Season MVP: Alexander Ovechkin (Capitals)
- Top scorer: Alexander Ovechkin (Capitals)

Playoffs
- Playoffs MVP: Henrik Zetterberg (Red Wings)

Stanley Cup
- Champions: Detroit Red Wings
- Runners-up: Pittsburgh Penguins

NHL seasons
- 2006–07 2008–09

The 2007–08 NHL season was the 91st season of operation (90th season of play) of the National Hockey League (NHL). It began on September 29, 2007, and the regular season ended April 6, 2008. The Stanley Cup playoffs ended on June 4, with the Detroit Red Wings defeating the Pittsburgh Penguins to win the Stanley Cup. The 56th NHL All-Star Game was held in Atlanta, Georgia, as the Atlanta Thrashers hosted the event at Philips Arena on January 27, 2008. The hosting by Atlanta was rescheduled from 2005, when a lockout cancelled the entire 2004–05 season.

== League business ==
=== Salary cap ===
The league announced that the regular season salary cap would be going up for the third consecutive season. The 2007–08 salary cap is being increased by US$6.3 million per team to bring the salary cap up to US$50.3 million. The salary floor is at US$34.3 million, which is 71.5% higher than the salary floor during the 2005–06 season.

=== Possible expansion discussions ===
During board of governors meetings held on September 18, 2007, in Chicago, cities including Las Vegas, Kansas City, Houston, Milwaukee, Quebec City, Seattle and Winnipeg were discussed as possible expansion destinations. The league would eventually not expand until the Vegas Golden Knights began play in the 2017–18 season.

=== Approval for new schedule format in 2008–09 ===
The NHL voted on a new schedule format at a board meeting in November, so that all teams will play each other at least once and reduce intradivisional play in the 2008–09 season, in essence returning to the scheduling structure that existed in 2003–04, and would have existed in 2004–05.

=== Rule changes ===
A number of minor rule changes were introduced for the start of the 2007–08 season. Penalty shots can now be awarded when a player with the puck is hauled down from the centre line on in rather than from the opposition's blue-line as had been the case. Also, the interference rule was altered to allow for a major penalty and a game misconduct when an injury results. Another change affected faceoff placement: All faceoffs must be conducted at one of the nine dots painted on the rink.

=== Entry draft ===
The 2007 NHL entry draft was held at Nationwide Arena in Columbus, Ohio, on June 22, 2007. Patrick Kane was selected first overall by the Chicago Blackhawks.

=== Uniforms ===
The season featured the debut of Reebok's new Rbk Edge hockey jerseys. This was the first league-wide uniform innovation in the history of any major North American professional sports league.

Seven teams (Boston, Tampa Bay, Vancouver, Washington, Ottawa, San Jose and Columbus) unveiled new designs.

== Arena changes ==
- The Nashville Predators' home arena, Nashville Arena, was renamed the Sommet Center after the Tennessee-based company Sommet Group signed a new naming rights agreement.
- The New Jersey Devils moved from Continental Airlines Arena in East Rutherford, New Jersey to Prudential Center in Newark, New Jersey, with Prudential Financial acquiring the naming rights.

== Regular season ==
=== First international regular season games ===
On March 1, 2007, the NHL announced the regular season would open on September 29, 2007, with the first of back-to-back games in London at The O2 Arena. They were the first NHL regular season games ever played in Europe. Both games featured the defending Stanley Cup champion Anaheim Ducks and the Los Angeles Kings (who are owned by Anschutz Entertainment Group, the same company that owns The O2).

=== First Winter Classic ===
On September 17, 2007, the NHL announced the first outdoor game in over four years would be played between the Pittsburgh Penguins and the Buffalo Sabres at Buffalo's Ralph Wilson Stadium, home of the National Football League's Buffalo Bills, on January 1, 2008. The event—known as the AMP Energy NHL Winter Classic—was the first time an NHL regular-season game had been played outdoors in the United States, and it set an NHL attendance record of 71,217 people. The only previous outdoor NHL game was the 2003 Heritage Classic played between the Montreal Canadiens and Edmonton Oilers at Commonwealth Stadium on November 22, 2003.

=== All-Star Game ===
The 2008 National Hockey League All-Star Game was held on January 27, 2008 at the Philips Arena in Atlanta, home of the Atlanta Thrashers. Atlanta had originally been scheduled to host what would have been the 55th NHL All-Star Game in 2005, however that game was canceled due to the NHL Lockout of 2004–05.

=== Highlights ===
The New Jersey Devils began playing in their new arena, the Prudential Center in Newark, New Jersey. However, since the arena was not ready by the beginning of the season, they began their season with a nine-game road trip.

Inter-conference division play had the Northeast visit the Pacific, the Pacific visit the Atlantic, the Atlantic visit the Northwest, the Northwest visit the Southeast, the Southeast visit the Central and the Central visit the Northeast.

Michael Cammalleri of the Los Angeles Kings scored the first goal of the season against the Anaheim Ducks on September 29 in the opening game played in London, United Kingdom.

Richard Zednik of the Florida Panthers was severely injured after having his external carotid artery in his neck accidentally cut by the skate of teammate Olli Jokinen in a game against the Buffalo Sabres on February 10. Zednik fully recovered from the injury, but missed the remainder of the season.

The Anaheim Ducks and Ottawa Senators matched up for the first time since the 2007 Stanley Cup Finals on March 3, 2008, in Anaheim.

The Washington Capitals improved from 14th place in the previous season and last in the Eastern Conference during the first third of the 2007–08 season to finish as the third seed in the 2007–08 playoffs and winners of the Southeast Division. The turnaround was attributed mainly to the hiring of then-American Hockey League coach Bruce Boudreau, whose efforts won him the Jack Adams Award for the 2007–08 season.

The Detroit Red Wings won the Presidents' Trophy for finishing the regular season with the most points (115).

Fewer goals were scored in the regular season than in the 2006–07 season, with an average of 5.44 goals scored per game (6,691 goals over 1,230 games). Goaltenders combined for 161 shutouts.

== Standings ==
GP = Games Played, W = Wins, L = Losses, OTL = Overtime/shootout losses, GF = Goals For, GA = Goals Against, Pts = Points.

Eastern Conference
R		Div	GP	W	L	OTL	GF	GA	Pts
**1**	**z – Montreal Canadiens**	**NE**	**82**	**47**	**25**	**10**	**262**	**222**	104
**2**	**y – Pittsburgh Penguins**	**AT**	**82**	**47**	**27**	**8**	**247**	**216**	102
**3**	**y – Washington Capitals**	**SE**	**82**	**43**	**31**	**8**	**242**	**231**	94
**4**	**New Jersey Devils**	**AT**	**82**	**46**	**29**	**7**	**206**	**197**	99
**5**	**New York Rangers**	**AT**	**82**	**42**	**27**	**13**	**213**	**199**	97
**6**	**Philadelphia Flyers**	**AT**	**82**	**42**	**29**	**11**	**248**	**233**	95
**7**	**Ottawa Senators**	**NE**	**82**	**43**	**31**	**8**	**261**	**247**	94
**8**	**Boston Bruins**	**NE**	**82**	**41**	**29**	**12**	**212**	**222**	94
8.5
9	Carolina Hurricanes	SE	82	43	33	6	252	249	92
10	Buffalo Sabres	NE	82	39	31	12	255	242	90
11	Florida Panthers	SE	82	38	35	9	216	226	85
12	Toronto Maple Leafs	NE	82	36	35	11	231	260	83
13	New York Islanders	AT	82	35	38	9	194	243	79
14	Atlanta Thrashers	SE	82	34	40	8	216	272	76
15	Tampa Bay Lightning	SE	82	31	42	9	223	267	71

Divisions: AT – Atlantic, NE – Northeast, SE – Southeast

bold – qualified for playoffs, y – division winner, z – placed first in conference (and division)

Western Conference
R		Div	GP	W	L	OTL	GF	GA	Pts
**1**	**p – Detroit Red Wings**	**CE**	**82**	**54**	**21**	**7**	**257**	**184**	115
**2**	**y – San Jose Sharks**	**PA**	**82**	**49**	**23**	**10**	**222**	**193**	108
**3**	**y – Minnesota Wild**	**NW**	**82**	**44**	**28**	**10**	**223**	**218**	98
**4**	**Anaheim Ducks**	**PA**	**82**	**47**	**27**	**8**	**205**	**191**	102
**5**	**Dallas Stars**	**PA**	**82**	**45**	**30**	**7**	**242**	**207**	97
**6**	**Colorado Avalanche**	**NW**	**82**	**44**	**31**	**7**	**231**	**219**	95
**7**	**Calgary Flames**	**NW**	**82**	**42**	**30**	**10**	**229**	**227**	94
**8**	**Nashville Predators**	**CE**	**82**	**41**	**32**	**9**	**230**	**229**	91
8.5
9	Edmonton Oilers	NW	82	41	35	6	235	251	88
10	Chicago Blackhawks	CE	82	40	34	8	239	235	88
11	Vancouver Canucks	NW	82	39	33	10	213	215	88
12	Phoenix Coyotes	PA	82	38	37	7	214	231	83
13	Columbus Blue Jackets	CE	82	34	36	12	193	218	80
14	St. Louis Blues	CE	82	33	36	13	205	237	79
15	Los Angeles Kings	PA	82	32	43	7	231	266	71

Divisions: PA – Pacific, CE – Central, NW – Northwest
bold – qualified for playoffs, y – division winner, p – Presidents' Trophy winner

=== Tiebreaking procedures ===
Where two or more clubs are tied in points at the end of the regular season, the standing of the clubs is determined in the following order:

1. The greater number of games won.
2. The greater number of points earned in games between the tied clubs.
3. The greater differential between goals for and against.

== Playoffs ==
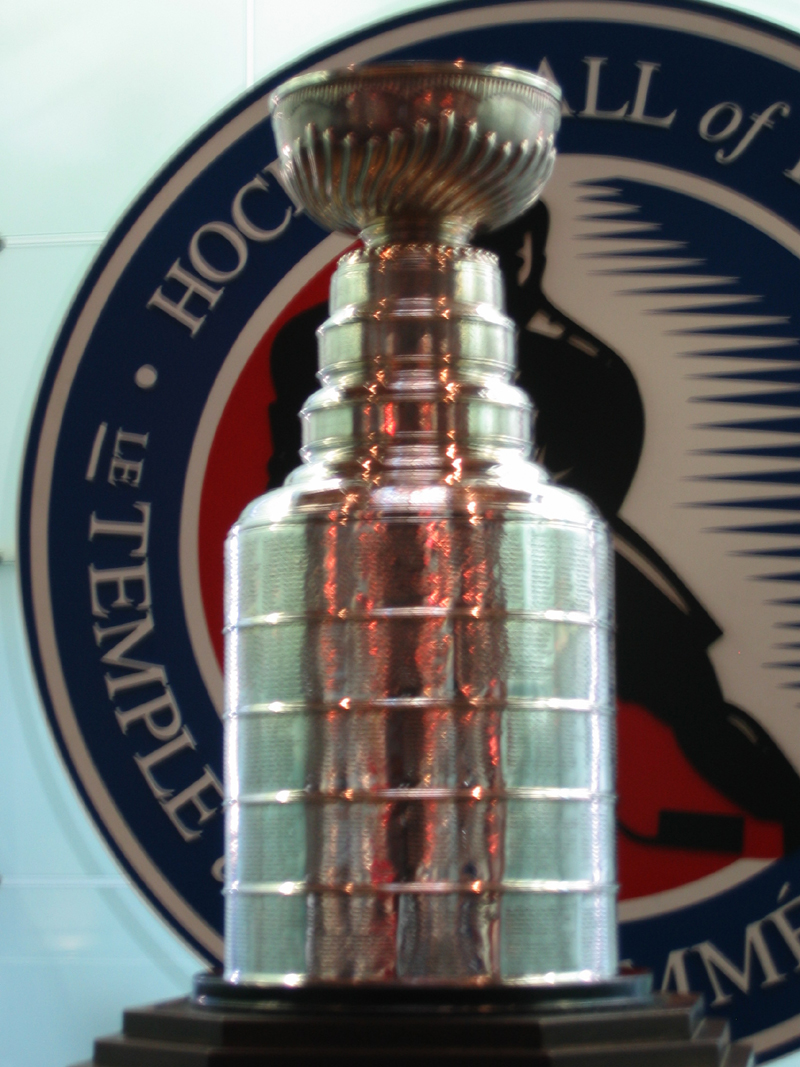
The Stanley Cup

=== Bracket ===
In each round, teams competed in a best-of-seven series following a 2–2–1–1–1 format (scores in the bracket indicate the number of games won in each best-of-seven series). The team with home ice advantage played at home for games one and two (and games five and seven, if necessary), and the other team played at home for games three and four (and game six, if necessary). The top eight teams in each conference made the playoffs, with the three division winners seeded 1–3 based on regular season record, and the five remaining teams seeded 4–8.

The NHL used "re-seeding" instead of a fixed bracket playoff system. During the first three rounds, the highest remaining seed in each conference was matched against the lowest remaining seed, the second-highest remaining seed played the second-lowest remaining seed, and so forth. The higher-seeded team was awarded home ice advantage. The two conference winners then advanced to the Stanley Cup Finals, where home ice advantage was awarded to the team that had the better regular season record.

Conference quarterfinals	Conference semifinals
1	Montreal	4
8	Boston	3
1	Montreal	1
6	Philadelphia	4
2	Pittsburgh	4
7	Ottawa	0
Eastern Conference
3	Washington	3
6	Philadelphia	4
2	Pittsburgh	4
5	NY Rangers	1
4	New Jersey	1
5	NY Rangers	4
1	Detroit	4
8	Nashville	2
1	Detroit	4
6	Colorado	0
2	San Jose	4
7	Calgary	3
Western Conference
3	Minnesota	2
6	Colorado	4
2	San Jose	2
5	Dallas	4
4	Anaheim	2
5	Dallas	4

Conference finals
6	Philadelphia	1
2	Pittsburgh	4
1	Detroit	4
5	Dallas	2

Stanley Cup Final
E2	Pittsburgh	2
W1	Detroit	4

== Awards ==
2007–08 NHL awards
Award	Recipient(s)	Runner(s)-up/Finalists
Presidents' Trophy	Detroit Red Wings	San Jose Sharks
Prince of Wales Trophy	Pittsburgh Penguins (Eastern Conference playoff champion)	Philadelphia Flyers
Clarence S. Campbell Bowl	Detroit Red Wings (Western Conference playoff champion)	Dallas Stars
Art Ross Trophy	Alexander Ovechkin, Washington Capitals	Evgeni Malkin (Pittsburgh Penguins)
Bill Masterton Memorial Trophy	Jason Blake, Toronto Maple Leafs	Fernando Pisani (Edmonton Oilers); Chris Chelios (Detroit Red Wings)
Calder Memorial Trophy	Patrick Kane, Chicago Blackhawks	Jonathan Toews (Chicago Blackhawks; Nicklas Backstrom (Washington Capitals)
Conn Smythe Trophy	Henrik Zetterberg, Detroit Red Wings	N/A
Frank J. Selke Trophy	Pavel Datsyuk, Detroit Red Wings	Henrik Zetterberg (Detroit Red Wings); John Madden (New Jersey Devils)
Hart Memorial Trophy	Alexander Ovechkin, Washington Capitals	Jarome Iginla (Calgary Flames); Evgeni Malkin (Pittsburgh Penguins)
Jack Adams Award	Bruce Boudreau, Washington Capitals	Mike Babcock (Detroit Red Wings); Guy Carbonneau (Montreal Canadiens)
James Norris Memorial Trophy	Nicklas Lidstrom, Detroit Red Wings	Zdeno Chara (Boston Bruins); Dion Phaneuf (Calgary Flames)
King Clancy Memorial Trophy	Vincent Lecavalier, Tampa Bay Lightning	N/A
Lady Byng Memorial Trophy	Pavel Datsyuk, Detroit Red Wings	Martin St. Louis (Tampa Bay Lightning); Jason Pominville (Buffalo Sabres)
Lester B. Pearson Award	Alexander Ovechkin, Washington Capitals	Jarome Iginla (Calgary Flames); Evgeni Malkin (Pittsburgh Penguins)
Maurice "Rocket" Richard Trophy	Alexander Ovechkin, Washington Capitals	Ilya Kovalchuk (Atlanta Thrashers)
NHL Foundation Player Award	Vincent Lecavalier, Tampa Bay Lightning and Trevor Linden, Vancouver Canucks	N/A
NHL Plus-Minus Award	Pavel Datsyuk, Detroit Red Wings	N/A
Vezina Trophy	Martin Brodeur, New Jersey Devils	Henrik Lundqvist (New York Rangers); Evgeni Nabakov (San Jose Sharks)
William M. Jennings Trophy	Dominik Hasek and Chris Osgood, Detroit Red Wings	N/A
NHL Lifetime Achievement Award	Gordie Howe	N/A

=== All-Star teams ===
First All-Star team

- Forwards: Alexander Ovechkin • Evgeni Malkin • Jarome Iginla
- Defencemen: Nicklas Lidstrom • Dion Phaneuf
- Goaltender: Evgeni Nabokov

Second All-Star team

- Forwards: Henrik Zetterberg • Joe Thornton • Alexei Kovalev
- Defencemen: Brian Campbell • Zdeno Chara
- Goaltender: Martin Brodeur

== Player statistics ==
=== Scoring leaders ===
GP = Games played; G = Goals; A = Assists; Pts = Points; +/– = Plus/minus; PIM = Penalty minutes

Player	Team	GP	G	A	Pts	+/–	PIM
Alexander Ovechkin	Washington Capitals	82	65	47	112	+28	40
Evgeni Malkin	Pittsburgh Penguins	82	47	59	106	+16	78
Jarome Iginla	Calgary Flames	82	50	48	98	+27	83
Pavel Datsyuk	Detroit Red Wings	82	31	66	97	+41	20
Joe Thornton	San Jose Sharks	82	29	67	96	+18	59
Henrik Zetterberg	Detroit Red Wings	75	43	49	92	+30	34
Vincent Lecavalier	Tampa Bay Lightning	81	40	52	92	–17	89
Jason Spezza	Ottawa Senators	76	34	58	92	+26	66
Daniel Alfredsson	Ottawa Senators	70	40	49	89	+15	34
Ilya Kovalchuk	Atlanta Thrashers	79	52	35	87	–12	52

Source: NHL.

=== Leading goaltenders ===
GP = Games played; TOI = Time on ice (minutes); W = Wins; L = Losses; OT = Overtime/shootout losses; GA = Goals against; SO = Shutouts; Sv% = Save percentage; GAA = Goals against average

Player	Team	GP	TOI	W	L	OT	GA	SO	SV%	GAA
Chris Osgood	Detroit Red Wings	43	2,409	27	9	4	84	4	.914	2.09
Jean-Sebastien Giguere	Anaheim Ducks	58	3,310	35	17	6	117	4	.922	2.12
Evgeni Nabokov	San Jose Sharks	77	4,560	46	21	8	163	6	.910	2.14
Dominik Hasek	Detroit Red Wings	41	2,350	27	10	3	84	5	.902	2.14
Martin Brodeur	New Jersey Devils	77	4,635	44	27	6	168	4	.920	2.17
Henrik Lundqvist	New York Rangers	72	4,304	37	24	10	160	10	.912	2.23
Pascal Leclaire	Columbus Blue Jackets	54	2,986	24	17	6	112	9	.919	2.25
Niklas Backstrom	Minnesota Wild	58	3,408	33	13	8	131	4	.920	2.31
Marty Turco	Dallas Stars	62	3,628	32	21	6	140	3	.909	2.31
Cristobal Huet	Montreal Canadiens/Washington Capitals	52	3,048	32	14	6	118	4	.920	2.32

== Coaches ==
=== Eastern Conference ===
- Atlanta Thrashers: Don Waddell
- Boston Bruins: Claude Julien
- Buffalo Sabres: Lindy Ruff
- Carolina Hurricanes: Peter Laviolette
- Florida Panthers: Jacques Martin
- Montreal Canadiens: Guy Carbonneau
- New Jersey Devils: Brent Sutter
- New York Islanders: Ted Nolan and Al Arbour
- New York Rangers: Tom Renney
- Ottawa Senators: John Paddock and Bryan Murray
- Philadelphia Flyers: John Stevens
- Pittsburgh Penguins: Michel Therrien
- Tampa Bay Lightning: John Tortorella
- Toronto Maple Leafs: Paul Maurice
- Washington Capitals: Bruce Boudreau

=== Western Conference ===
- Anaheim Ducks: Randy Carlyle
- Calgary Flames: Mike Keenan
- Chicago Blackhawks: Denis Savard
- Colorado Avalanche: Joel Quenneville
- Columbus Blue Jackets: Ken Hitchcock
- Dallas Stars: Dave Tippett
- Detroit Red Wings: Mike Babcock
- Edmonton Oilers: Craig MacTavish
- Los Angeles Kings: Marc Crawford
- Minnesota Wild: Jacques Lemaire
- Nashville Predators: Barry Trotz
- Phoenix Coyotes: Wayne Gretzky
- San Jose Sharks: Ron Wilson
- St. Louis Blues: Andy Murray
- Vancouver Canucks: Alain Vigneault

== Milestones ==
- On October 3, in his first game with Montreal, Roman Hamrlik played in his 1,000th NHL game.
- On October 7, Joe Sakic reached 1,591 points, moving him past Phil Esposito for eighth all-time in scoring.
- On October 8, Chris Chelios played in his 1,550th game, moving him past Alex Delvecchio for eighth place on the career list.
- On October 12, Jaromir Jagr scored his 1,533rd career point, passing Paul Coffey for 11th in all-time scoring.
- On October 22, Bryan Smolinski played in his 1,000th NHL game.
- On October 26, Alexei Kovalev played in his 1,000th NHL game, the third Montreal player to reach this milestone in October.
- On November 3, Al Arbour coached his 1,500th game with the New York Islanders and earned his 740th win with the team. Both are NHL records for coaching a single team. At 75 years old, he was the oldest man to coach in an NHL game.
- On November 10, Jeremy Roenick scored his 500th career NHL goal, becoming only the 40th player in the history of the league to do so, and only the third American.
- On November 17, Martin Brodeur recorded his 500th career win, becoming only the second goaltender in the history of the league to do so.
- On November 17, Glen Wesley played in his 1,400th NHL game, becoming the 10th defenceman to do so.
- On December 20, Marian Gaborik scored five goals for the Minnesota Wild in a 6–3 win against the New York Rangers. It is the first time a player has scored five goals in a game since Sergei Fedorov did so on December 26, 1996.
- On December 23, New York Rangers captain Jaromir Jagr recorded his 927th assist, passing Stan Mikita for 15th place on the all-time list.
- On January 17, Markus Naslund played in his 1000th NHL game.
- On February 9, San Jose Sharks coach Ron Wilson earned his 500th career win as an NHL head coach, becoming the 11th in league history to do so.
- On March 12, Olaf Kolzig recorded his 300th win, becoming the 23rd goaltender to reach the mark.
- On March 13, the Detroit Red Wings reached the 100-point mark for the eighth straight season, tying an NHL record set by the Montreal Canadiens from 1975–1982.
- On March 22, Joe Sakic recorded his 1,000th assist on a goal by teammate Tyler Arnason, becoming just the 11th player to reach this mark.
- On April 6, Keith Tkachuk scored his 500th career goal, becoming the fourth American-born player to do so.
- On April 9, Joe Sakic extended his record for playoff overtime goals to eight.
- On April 12, Chris Chelios played his 248th career playoff game, moving past Patrick Roy for most career playoff games played.

=== Debuts ===
The following is a list of players of note who played their first NHL game in 2007–08:

Player	Team	Notability
Nicklas Backstrom	Washington Capitals	Over 1,000 games played
Brian Boyle	New York Rangers	Bill Masterton Memorial Trophy winner
Andrew Cogliano	Edmonton Oilers	Over 1,000 games played
Brian Elliott	Ottawa Senators	William M. Jennings Trophy winner, Two-time NHL All-Star
Nick Foligno	Ottawa Senators	King Clancy Memorial Trophy winner, Mark Messier Leadership Award winner, Over 1,000 games played
Claude Giroux	Philadelphia Flyers	Six-time NHL All-Star, One-time NHL All-Star team, Over 1,000 games played
Thomas Greiss	San Jose Sharks	William M. Jennings Trophy winner
Erik Johnson	St. Louis Blues	First overall pick in the 2006 Draft
Patrick Kane	Chicago Blackhawks	First overall pick in the 2007 Draft, Calder Memorial Trophy winner, Hart Memorial Trophy winner, Art Ross Trophy winner, Ted Lindsay Award winner, Conn Smythe Trophy winner, Four-time NHL All-Star team, over 1,000 games played
Milan Lucic	Boston Bruins	Over 1,000 games played
Carey Price	Montreal Canadiens	Hart Memorial Trophy winner, Vezina Trophy winner, Ted Lindsay Award winner, William M. Jennings Trophy winner, Bill Masterton Memorial Trophy winner, One-time NHL All-Star team
Jonathan Quick	Los Angeles Kings	Two-time William M. Jennings Trophy winner, Conn Smythe Trophy winner, One-time NHL All-Star team
Tuukka Rask	Boston Bruins	Vezina Trophy winner, William M. Jennings Trophy winner, Two-time NHL All-Star team
Bobby Ryan	Anaheim Ducks	Bill Masterton Memorial Trophy winner
Marc Staal	New York Rangers	Over 1,000 games played
Jonathan Toews	Chicago Blackhawks	Conn Smythe Trophy winner, Frank J. Selke Trophy winner, Mark Messier Leadership Award winner, over 1,000 games played

=== Last games ===
The following is a list of players of note who played their last NHL game in 2007–08, listed with their team:

Player	Team	Notability
Bryan Berard	New York Islanders	Calder Memorial Trophy winner; Bill Masterton Memorial Trophy winner.
Stu Barnes	Dallas Stars	Over 1100 games played.
Sergei Brylin	New Jersey Devils	3-time Stanley Cup champion with the Devils.
Keith Carney	Minnesota Wild	Over 1000 games played.
Dallas Drake	Detroit Red Wings	Over 1,000 games played.
Martin Gelinas	Nashville Predators	2-time Fred J. Hume Award winner, over 1200 games played.
Dominik Hasek	Detroit Red Wings	6-time Vezina Trophy winner; 5-time NHL All-Star; 3-time William M. Jennings Trophy winner; 2-time Hart Memorial Trophy winner; 2-time Lester B. Pearson Award winner.
Derian Hatcher	Philadelphia Flyers	Over 1,000 games played.
Sami Kapanen	Philadelphia Flyers	2-time Olympic bronze medalist; 2-time NHL All-Star.
Trevor Linden	Vancouver Canucks	King Clancy Memorial Trophy winner; NHL Foundation Player Award winner; 2-time NHL All-Star; over 1300 games played.
Jaroslav Modry	Philadelphia Flyers	1-time NHL All-Star.
Glen Murray	Boston Bruins	2-time NHL All-Star, over 1000 games played.
Sandis Ozolinsh	San Jose Sharks	7-time NHL All-Star.
Martin Rucinsky	St. Louis Blues	Olympic gold and bronze medalist.
Geoff Sanderson	Edmonton Oilers	2-time NHL All-Star.
Bryan Smolinski	Montreal Canadiens	Over 1000 games played.
Martin Straka	New York Rangers	Olympic gold and bronze medalist.
David Vyborny	Columbus Blue Jackets	Olympic bronze medalist.
Glen Wesley	Carolina Hurricanes	Over 1,400 games played.
Alexei Zhitnik	Atlanta Thrashers	Olympic gold and silver medalist, 2-time NHL All-Star, over 1000 games played.

== Broadcasting rights ==
In Canada, national rights were split between CBC and TSN. CBC aired Saturday night Hockey Night in Canada regular season games, while TSN's coverage included Wednesday Night Hockey and other selected weeknights. During the first three rounds of the Stanley Cup playoffs, TSN televised all-U.S. games while CBC aired all games involving Canadian teams. CBC then had exclusive coverage of the Stanley Cup Finals.

This was the third season of the league's U.S. national broadcast rights deals with NBC and Versus. With Versus' original three-year contract set to expire after this season, the cable network signed an extension through the 2010–11 season. Likewise, NBC announced the activation of its option to extend its broadcasting rights through the next three seasons. Versus aired regular season games generally on Monday and Tuesday nights. NBC's coverage was modified this season, with the broadcast network airing only one game nationally on selected weekends instead of televising two or three games regionally in these broadcast windows. During the playoffs, NBC had the rights to air selected weekend games during the first three postseason rounds of the Stanley Cup playoffs, and games 3–7 of the Stanley Cup Finals, while Versus televised selected first and second round playoff games, all Conference Finals games not aired on NBC, and the first two games of the Stanley Cup Finals.

== See also ==
- 2007 in ice hockey
- 2007 NHL entry draft
- 2007–08 NHL transactions
- 56th National Hockey League All-Star Game
- AMP Energy NHL Winter Classic
- NHL schedule structure
- Lester Patrick Trophy
