= Pat Dapuzzo =

- Born: December 29, 1958 (age 67) Hoboken, New Jersey, U.S.
- Position: Linesman
- Played for: National Hockey League
- Playing career: 1984–2008

Pat Dapuzzo (born December 29, 1958) is a retired National Hockey League linesman. Over an extensive officiating career that spanned from 1984–2008, he was known for wearing the distinctive uniform number 60. Throughout those 24 years, Dapuzzo played a crucial role in managing the flow of countless NHL games, ensuring fair play and upholding the rules on the ice.

== Biography ==
Dapuzzo grew up in North Bergen, New Jersey, where he played roller hockey near his church and attended Franklin Elementary School. Despite limited local ice skating opportunities, he developed impressive skating skills that helped him become an NHL linesman just six years after high school, starting in the 1984–85 NHL season. Over his career, he officiated 1,532 regular-season games, 63 playoff games, an NHL All-Star Game, and the 1991 Canada Cup, earning respect for his fairness and expertise at both national and international levels.

== Retirement ==
Dapuzzo retired after the 2007–08 NHL season following a serious injury sustained on February 9, 2008. He was accidentally struck in the face by the skate of Philadelphia Flyers' Steve Downie during a game. The incident caused ten facial fractures and nearly severed his nose, which required over forty stitches to reattach. The injury, which might have been prevented had he been wearing a visor, effectively ended his officiating career and prompted discussions about safety equipment for officials. Despite the setback, Dapuzzo remained involved in hockey as a part-time scout for the Toronto Maple Leafs.
