= 2008 National Hockey League All-Star Game =

Professional ice hockey exhibition game

2008 NHL All-Star Game
| | 1 | 2 | 3 | Total |
|---|---|---|---|---|
| West | 1 | 2 | 4 | 7 |
| East | 5 | 0 | 3 | 8 |
- Date: January 27, 2008
- Arena: Philips Arena
- City: Atlanta
- MVP: Eric Staal (Carolina)
- Attendance: 18,644

The 2008 National Hockey League All-Star Game was held on January 27, 2008, at the Philips Arena in Atlanta, home of the Atlanta Thrashers. It was the only time the All-Star Game was held in Atlanta, as the Thrashers moved to Winnipeg in 2011 as the new Winnipeg Jets (the old Winnipeg Jets moved to Arizona to become the now-deactivated Coyotes in 1996).

Atlanta had originally been scheduled to host what would have been the 55th NHL All-Star Game in 2005, however that game was canceled due to the NHL Lockout of 2004–05.

Players in this game, like the 55th National Hockey League All-Star Game, wore Rbk EDGE jerseys. The jersey logos had been redesigned, showing a simple logo that displays East and West on the respective conference jerseys, captain and alternate captain patches on the right side (instead of left), and the player's number below the logo.

== Diversity honored ==
As Atlanta is a place of significance to the Civil Rights Movement (among the hockey-related achievements is John Paris Jr. becoming the first black person to coach a pro hockey team, the Atlanta Knights of the International Hockey League), and 2008 is the 50th anniversary of Willie O'Ree breaking hockey's color barrier with the Boston Bruins, the NHL chose the All-Star weekend to honour the diversity of the league.

== Changes in the All-Star program ==
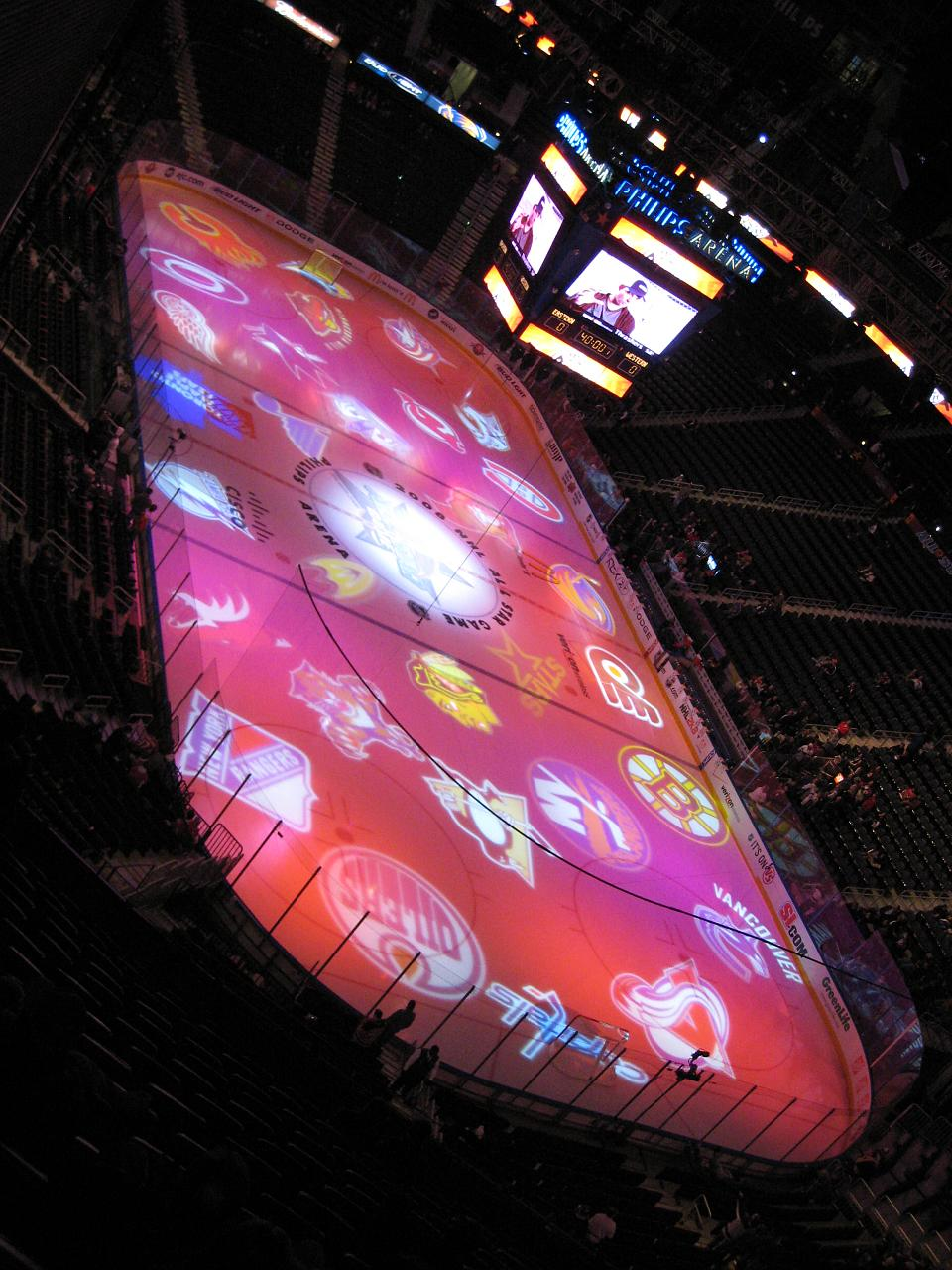
Philips Arena before the NHL Skills competition began

The previous year's YoungStars game and skills competition, which lead up to the main game, were criticized for the lack of excitement: the YoungStars game saw a lack of effort by the players overall, while the shootout portion of the skills competition was criticized for being too boring - in the previous year, at three different points in the skills competition, each goaltender would take on four opposing players in regular penalty shots - which in itself is not too different from what was seen in regular-season play.

For this year, to raise interest in all-star festivities, no YoungStars goaltenders were named - instead, the YoungStars played in a three-on-three game (of two running six-minute periods) halfway through the skills competition, with the regular all-star goaltenders in net. There was only one faceoff at the start of each half - if the puck goes out of play, another puck was thrown onto the ice. If a goal was scored, the three players retreated to their own side of centre ice before being able to attack again. For either side to win the YoungStars game, the team must score greater goals in both halves. Brandon Dubinsky of the New York Rangers was named the Youngstars MVP for scoring 2 goals and an assist.

Furthermore, the skills competition itself was changed dramatically - the Fastest Skater competition is now a sprint instead of a lap around the arena (a final showdown portion has also been added), while the traditional Puck Control Relay was changed to the Obstacle Course event, where stick handling, saucer passes, one-timers, and goaltenders attempting to score by shooting pucks the length of the ice into an empty net (itself a former All-Star Skills event called Goalie Goals) is featured. Both changes were made to further reflect game conditions. The traditional Shooting Accuracy remains, though a final showdown stage (consisting of having to shoot four targets in nine seconds with only four pucks, and if still tied, one shot in three seconds at one target) is held to determine an individual winner. Hardest Shot is the only event unchanged from previous years.

But by far the greatest change is in the shootout portion: two events are based on the shootout: in the Elimination Shootout, skaters shoot against the all-star goaltenders, with a skater being eliminated if they fail to score. The second shootout-based event, the Breakaway Challenge, incorporates elements from the National Basketball Association's All-Star Slam Dunk Contest: three players from each team (as selected by the all-star team captains) will be judged on their style and creativity by a panel of four judges as they attempt to score on a non-NHL goaltender. The judges may award up to nine points, and a bonus point is added should the skater score. The judging panel this year consists of Dominique Wilkins, a former two-time Slam Dunk Champion with the Atlanta Hawks, former Thrashers captain Scott Mellanby, Canadian actor Taylor Kitsch, and broadcaster Bill Clement. The two skaters (one from each team) with the highest scores face off in a final showdown to determine the winner of the event.

== Rosters ==
| | Eastern Conference | Western Conference |
| Coach: | (Canada) John Paddock (Ottawa Senators) | (Canada) Mike Babcock (Detroit Red Wings) |
| Assistant coach: | (United States) Don Waddell (Atlanta Thrashers) | (United States) Ron Wilson (San Jose Sharks) |
|---|---|---|
| Starters: | (United States) 39 – G Rick DiPietro (New York Islanders) (Slovakia) 33 – D Zdeno Chara (Boston Bruins) (Russia) 79 – D Andrei Markov (Montreal Canadiens) (Canada) 4 – F Vincent Lecavalier (Tampa Bay Lightning) - (C) (Sweden) 11 – F Daniel Alfredsson (Ottawa Senators) (Russia) 17 – F Ilya Kovalchuk (Atlanta Thrashers) | (Canada) 30 – G Chris Osgood (Detroit Red Wings) (Canada) 3 – D Dion Phaneuf (Calgary Flames) (Sweden) 5 – D Nicklas Lidstrom (Detroit Red Wings) (Canada) 12 – F Jarome Iginla (Calgary Flames) - (C) (Russia) 13 – F Pavel Datsyuk (Detroit Red Wings) (Canada) 61 – F Rick Nash (Columbus Blue Jackets) |
| Reserves: | (Czech Republic) 29 – G Tomas Vokoun (Florida Panthers) (United States) 30 – G Tim Thomas (Boston Bruins) (Czech Republic) 15 – D Tomas Kaberle (Toronto Maple Leafs) (Finland) 44 – D Kimmo Timonen (Philadelphia Flyers) (Canada) 51 – D Brian Campbell (Buffalo Sabres) (Russia) 55 – D Sergei Gonchar (Pittsburgh Penguins) (Russia) 8 – F Alexander Ovechkin (Washington Capitals) (Canada) 9 – F Jason Spezza (Ottawa Senators) (Canada) 10 – F Mike Richards (Philadelphia Flyers) (Canada) 12 – F Eric Staal (Carolina Hurricanes) (Slovakia) 18 – F Marian Hossa (Atlanta Thrashers) (United States) 19 – F Scott Gomez (New York Rangers) (Canada) 26 – F Martin St. Louis (Tampa Bay Lightning) (Russia) 71 – F Evgeni Malkin (Pittsburgh Penguins) (Canada) 91 – F Marc Savard (Boston Bruins) | (Russia) 20 – G Evgeni Nabokov (San Jose Sharks) (Canada) 34 – G Manny Legace (St. Louis Blues) (Canada) 2 – D Duncan Keith (Chicago Blackhawks) (Canada) 25 – D Chris Pronger (Anaheim Ducks) (Canada) 27 – D Scott Niedermayer (Anaheim Ducks) (Canada) 55 – D Ed Jovanovski (Phoenix Coyotes) (Slovakia) 9 – F Marian Gaborik (Minnesota Wild) (Canada) 10 – F Shawn Horcoff (Edmonton Oilers) (Slovenia) 11 – F Anze Kopitar (Los Angeles Kings) (Canada) 15 – F Ryan Getzlaf (Anaheim Ducks) (Canada) 18 – F Corey Perry (Anaheim Ducks) (Canada) 19 – F Jason Arnott (Nashville Predators) (Sweden) 33 – F Henrik Sedin (Vancouver Canucks) (Canada) 63 – F Mike Ribeiro (Dallas Stars) (Canada) 97 – F Joe Thornton (San Jose Sharks) |

Notes

- ^1Martin Brodeur was named to the East All-Star Team as a starter, but did not play in favor of resting over the break. Tim Thomas was named as his replacement on the roster, while Rick DiPietro was named as his replacement on the starting lineup.
- ^2Roberto Luongo was voted to the West all-star team as a starter, but did not play (personal). Chris Osgood was named as his replacement in the starting lineup (no roster replacement was named as the reserves had not been announced at the time).
- ^3The top line of the Ottawa Senators (Alfredsson, Heatley, Spezza) was the first forward line to be named in their entirety to the All-Star Game since 1981, when the Los Angeles Kings had their top line named.
- ^4Sidney Crosby was named to the East all-star team as a starter, but did not play due to injury. Evgeni Malkin was named as his roster replacement, while Ilya Kovalchuk was named as his replacement on the starting lineup.
- ^5Henrik Zetterberg was named to the West All-Star Team as a starter, but did not play. Mike Ribeiro was named as his replacement, while Rick Nash was named as his replacement on the starting lineup.
- ^6Sergei Zubov was named to the West All-Star Team, but did not play. Scott Niedermayer was named as his replacement.
- ^7Dany Heatley was voted to the East all-star team, but was unable to play due to injury. Marc Savard was named as his replacement.
- ^8Paul Stastny was named to the West All-Star Team, but was unable to play due to injury. Corey Perry was named as his replacement.

== Summary ==
WEST | 7 - 8 (1-5, 2-0, 4-3) | EAST | Philips Arena (18,644); Atlanta, Georgia
First period
Nash 0:12 | Referees:
1:20 Staal (Campbell, Malkin) | Rob Martell
9:43 Markov (Richards, Hossa) | Brad Watson
13:35 Ovechkin (Spezza, St. Louis)
15:10 Campbell (Malkin, Lecavalier) | Linesmen:
17:49 Ovechkin (2) (St. Louis, Spezza) | Lyle Seitz
Second period | Pat Dapuzzo
Nash (2) (Datsyuk) 9:34
Niedermayer (Thornton, Sedin) 15:08 | MVP:
Third period | Eric Staal (Carolina)
Getzlaf (Jovanovski) 0:41
Nash (3) (Iginla) 1:56
4:08 Hossa (Gomez, Chara)
Phaneuf (Getzlaf, Arnott) 5:07
Gaborik (Sedin) 10:57
12:35 Staal (2) (Kovalchuk, Savard)
19:39 Savard (GWG) (Campbell, Staal)

W - Tim Thomas L - Manny Legace TV: Versus, CBC, RDS
