= Brian Campbell =

Canadian ice hockey player (born 1979)

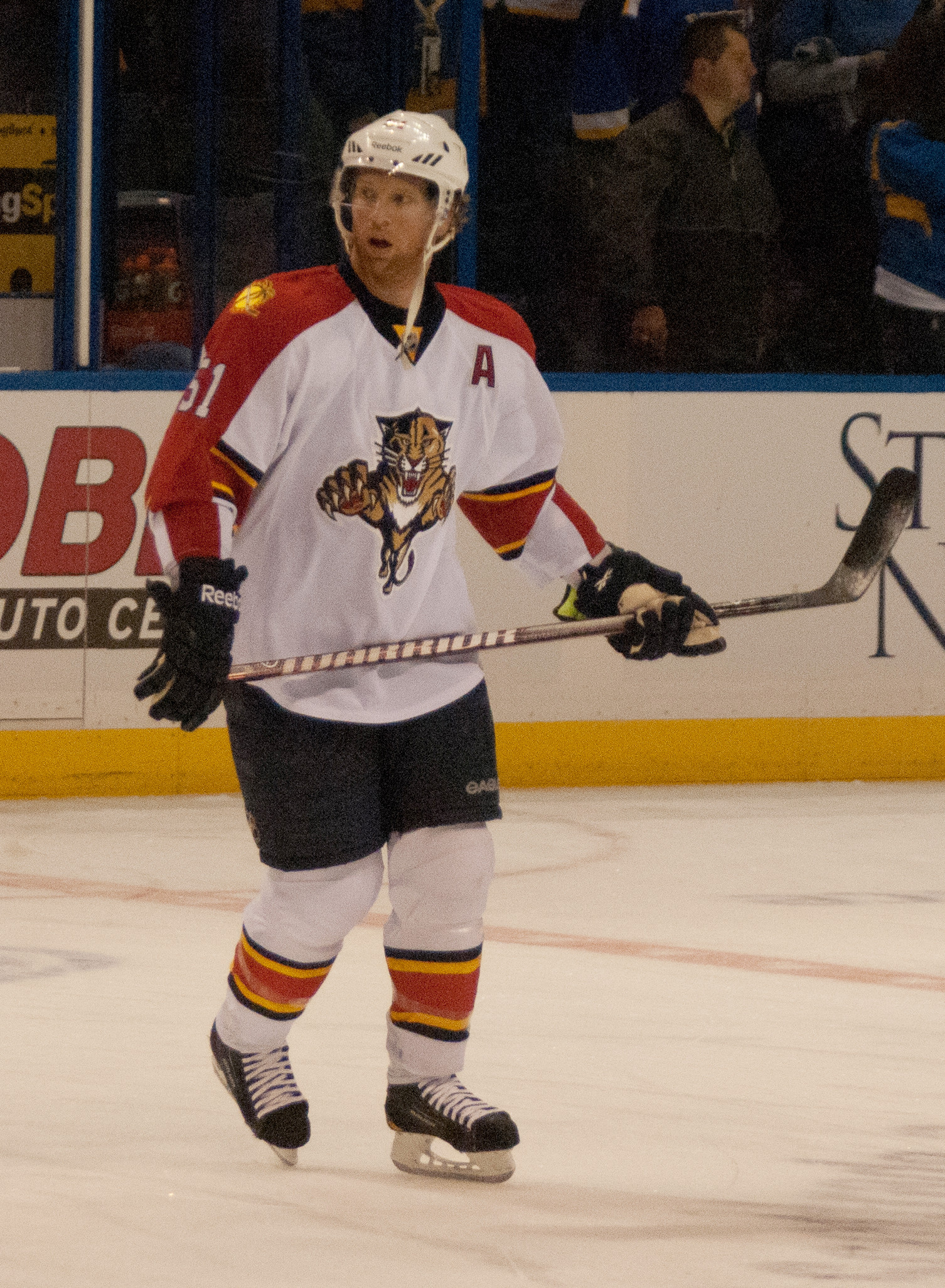
- Campbell with the Florida Panthers in November 2011
- Born: May 23, 1979 (age 47) Strathroy, Ontario, Canada
- Height: 5 ft 10 in (178 cm)
- Weight: 190 lb (86 kg; 13 st 8 lb)
- Position: Defence
- Shot: Left
- Played for: Buffalo Sabres; Jokerit; San Jose Sharks; Chicago Blackhawks; Florida Panthers
- National team: Canada
- NHL draft: 156th overall, 1997; Buffalo Sabres
- Playing career: 1999–2017
Medal record
Representing Canada
Ice hockey
World Junior Championships
Silver medal – second place	1999 Canada

Brian Wesley Campbell (born May 23, 1979) is a Canadian former professional ice hockey defenceman. He played for the Buffalo Sabres, San Jose Sharks, Chicago Blackhawks and Florida Panthers of the National Hockey League (NHL). He won the Stanley Cup with the Blackhawks in 2010, assisting on the deciding goal.

== Personal life ==
Campbell grew up in Strathroy, Ontario, where he attended elementary school at Colborne Street Public School and high school at Strathroy District Collegiate Institute. He also attended Canterbury High School in Ottawa, while playing for the Ottawa 67's of the Ontario Hockey League (OHL). His parents are Ed and Lorna. He has two brothers, Craig and Darryl. Darryl also played pro hockey for four seasons in the ECHL, lastly for the Mississippi Sea Wolves.

In 2003, Campbell was quarantined due to a potential SARS outbreak — a relative of Campbell, who worked at a hospital, had visited him just before the relative began to show SARS symptoms and was subsequently hospitalized. This led to the quarantine of both Campbell and then-teammate and roommate Rhett Warrener. Campbell missed three games before being cleared to play again. Neither player had any SARS symptoms.

Campbell and Lauren Miller got engaged during the 2011 NHL All-Star break.

Campbell has been given the nickname "Soupy" because he shares his surname with that of the Campbell's.

Campbell's jersey was retired by the Ottawa 67's' during their 50th anniversary season. It was officially retired on November 3, 2017, at TD Place Arena prior to a game against the Barrie Colts. Campbell is the fifth player to have their number retired by the Ottawa 67's.

== Playing career ==
=== Early years ===
Campbell grew up playing minor hockey in his hometown of Strathroy, Ontario, where he won an OMHA Championship at the novice level. He also played AAA hockey for the Elgin-Middlesex Major Bantam Chiefs, along with future NHL teammate Joe Thornton, in 1993–94, which was the organization's inaugural year. In 1994–95, Campbell signed with the Petrolia Jets Jr.B. (OHA) of the Western Ontario Hockey League (WOHL).

Following his season with the Jets, Campbell was drafted by the Ottawa 67's. The 67's first-round pick that season was Nick Boynton, who would end up being a defence partner with Campbell for four seasons in Ottawa; they reunited 15 years later as teammates on the 2010 Stanley Cup-winning Chicago Blackhawks.

Campbell was taken by the Ottawa 67's in the OHL as a third-round draft pick in the 1995 OHL Priority Selection. In 1998–99, he won the Red Tilson Trophy as the OHL's Most Outstanding Player. He also won the Max Kaminsky Trophy as the OHL's Defenceman of the Year and the William Hanley Trophy as the OHL's Most Gentlemanly Player, CHL Player of the Year, and finally, the Memorial Cup as Ottawa defeated Calgary 7–6 in overtime on home ice.

=== Professional ===
==== Buffalo Sabres ====
Campbell was drafted by the Buffalo Sabres as their sixth-round pick in the 1997 NHL entry draft. He played his first game for the Sabres in the 1999–2000 season and stayed with the team, wearing number 51, until February 26, 2008, when he was traded to San Jose. During the NHL lockout in 2004–05, he played for Jokerit in the Finnish SM-liiga and won the silver medal in the league championships.

On January 9, 2007, Campbell was the leading vote-getter amongst Eastern Conference defenceman for the 2007 NHL All-Star Game, earning him his first All-Star appearance. As a result of the Sabres' rotating captaincy policy, Campbell was named an alternate captain for the month of November 2007 and captain for the month of December. Campbell was then selected again to the 2008 NHL All-Star Game.

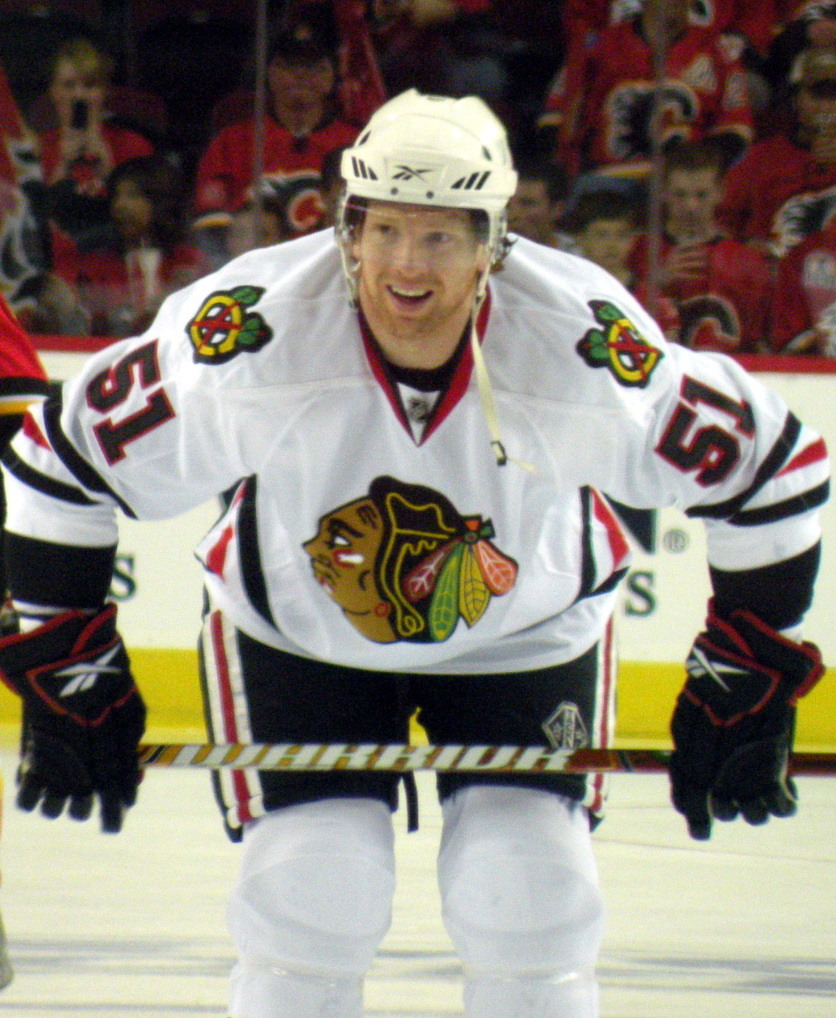
Campbell with the Chicago Blackhawks in April 2009

==== San Jose Sharks ====
The 2007–08 season was the final season Campbell was under contract with Buffalo. On February 26, 2008, at the NHL trade deadline, the Sabres traded Campbell, along with their seventh-round draft pick in the 2008 NHL entry draft (194th overall; Drew Daniels), to the San Jose Sharks in exchange for forward Steve Bernier and their 2008 first-round pick (26th overall; Tyler Ennis). The Sharks were eventually eliminated in the Western Conference Semi-finals by the Dallas Stars, and Campbell became a free agent at the conclusion of the season.

Campbell also led the NHL during the 2007–08 season in games played, being one of just two players to appear in 83 games, or one game more than a team's full schedule, because of his trade to San Jose; the other was Jeff Halpern. Campbell was named a member of the NHL Competition Committee on April 21, 2008.

==== Chicago Blackhawks ====
On July 1, 2008, Campbell signed an eight-year contract as an unrestricted free agent with the Chicago Blackhawks for roughly $7.1 million annually. Fox Chicago reported that Campbell chose to sign with the Blackhawks despite allegedly receiving better contract offers from other organizations. He played in all 82 of Chicago's regular-season games in the 2008–09 season, scoring seven goals to go with 45 assists for 52 points as Blackhawks qualified for the playoffs for the first time since 2002. He contributed two goals with eight assists in all 17 Stanley Cup playoff games that season as Chicago defeated the Calgary Flames in six games and Vancouver Canucks in six games within the first two rounds of the 2009 playoffs before they were eliminated by the defending Stanley Cup champion Detroit Red Wings in the Western Conference Finals in five games.

On March 14, 2010, 68 games into the 2009–10 season, Campbell was injured in a boarding incident caused by Washington Capitals captain Alexander Ovechkin. Ovechkin was assessed a major penalty and game misconduct for boarding, while Campbell did not return to the game. As a consequence of the illegal boarding hit, Ovechkin was suspended two games by the NHL. Campbell sustained a broken clavicle and broken rib, and was expected to miss seven-to-eight weeks. He ended the season with seven goals and 31 assists for 38 points in the first 68 games before missing the final 14 games and the first three games in the opening round of the playoffs. Prior to the injury, Campbell had played 388 consecutive games. Campbell managed to return by Game 4 of the first round of the 2010 playoffs against the Nashville Predators, igniting the team to a three-game win streak to knock Nashville out of the playoffs in six games. The Blackhawks would defeat the Vancouver Canucks in six games for the second consecutive year in six games before sweeping the San Jose Sharks in the third round to clinch a spot in the 2010 Stanley Cup Finals. In Game 6 of the final, with the Blackhawks up three games to two in the series, Campbell recorded the lone assist on Patrick Kane's overtime game-winner to down the Philadelphia Flyers and clinch the Stanley Cup on June 9, 2010.

On October 1, 2010, in a 5–2 pre-season win over the Pittsburgh Penguins, Campbell sustained a sprained knee in a collision with Penguins' forward Eric Tangradi, resulting in him missing the last pre-season game and the first 13 games of the 2010–11 season. He ended the 2010–11 season with five goals and 22 assists for 27 points in 65 games played. He also followed up with a goal and two assists for three points in all seven games of the opening round of the 2011 playoffs as the Blackhawks would go on to lose in seven games to the Presidents' Trophy-winning Vancouver Canucks.

==== Florida Panthers ====
On June 24, 2011, during the 2011 NHL entry draft, Campbell was dealt to the Florida Panthers in exchange for forward Rostislav Olesz. During his first season in Florida, Campbell had four goals and 49 assists for 53 points and only six penalty minutes, becoming the first defenceman since Red Kelly in the 1953–54 season to win the Lady Byng Memorial Trophy for sportsmanship and gentlemanly conduct combined with a high standard of playing ability and the Panthers qualified for the playoffs for the first time since 2000. He also recorded a goal and four assists for five points in all six games as the Panthers were defeated in the opening round of the 2012 playoffs in seven games by the New Jersey Devils, squandering a 3–2 series lead.

==== Return to Chicago ====
On July 1, 2016, Campbell signed a one-year contract as an unrestricted free agent with Chicago for roughly $2 million in base salary, with additional performance-related bonuses included.

On July 17, 2017, Campbell announced his retirement, but also that he would join the Blackhawks' business operations department where he will be assisting with various marketing, community relations, and youth hockey initiatives.

== International play ==
Campbell was a member of Team Canada at the 1999 World Junior Championships, and was named a First Team All-Star for the tournament. After completion of the Panthers' 2012–13 season, Campbell extended his availability to make his long-awaited senior debut for Canada at the 2013 World Championships in Sweden and Finland.

== Career statistics ==
=== Regular season and playoffs ===
			Regular season					Playoffs
Season	Team	League	GP	G	A	Pts	PIM	GP	G	A	Pts	PIM
1993–94	Elgin-Middlesex Chiefs	MHAO	—	—	—	—	—	—	—	—	—	—
1994–95	Petrolia Jets	WOHL	49	11	27	38	43	—	—	—	—	—
1995–96	Ottawa 67's	OHL	66	5	22	27	23	4	0	1	1	2
1996–97	Ottawa 67's	OHL	66	7	36	43	12	24	2	11	13	8
1997–98	Ottawa 67's	OHL	66	14	39	53	31	13	1	14	15	0
1998–99	Ottawa 67's	OHL	62	12	75	87	27	9	2	10	12	6
1998–99	Rochester Americans	AHL	—	—	—	—	—	2	0	0	0	0
1999–2000	Rochester Americans	AHL	67	2	24	26	22	21	0	3	3	0
1999–2000	Buffalo Sabres	NHL	12	1	4	5	4	—	—	—	—	—
2000–01	Rochester Americans	AHL	65	7	25	32	24	4	0	1	1	0
2000–01	Buffalo Sabres	NHL	8	0	0	0	2	—	—	—	—	—
2001–02	Rochester Americans	AHL	45	2	35	37	13	—	—	—	—	—
2001–02	Buffalo Sabres	NHL	29	3	3	6	12	—	—	—	—	—
2002–03	Buffalo Sabres	NHL	65	2	17	19	20	—	—	—	—	—
2003–04	Buffalo Sabres	NHL	53	3	8	11	12	—	—	—	—	—
2004–05	Jokerit	SM-l	44	12	13	25	12	12	3	4	7	6
2005–06	Buffalo Sabres	NHL	79	12	32	44	16	18	0	6	6	12
2006–07	Buffalo Sabres	NHL	82	6	42	48	35	16	3	4	7	14
2007–08	Buffalo Sabres	NHL	61	5	38	43	12	—	—	—	—	—
2007–08	San Jose Sharks	NHL	20	3	16	19	8	13	1	6	7	4
2008–09	Chicago Blackhawks	NHL	82	7	45	52	22	17	2	8	10	0
2009–10	Chicago Blackhawks	NHL	68	7	31	38	18	19	1	4	5	2
2010–11	Chicago Blackhawks	NHL	65	5	22	27	6	7	1	2	3	6
2011–12	Florida Panthers	NHL	82	4	49	53	6	7	1	4	5	2
2012–13	Florida Panthers	NHL	48	8	19	27	12	—	—	—	—	—
2013–14	Florida Panthers	NHL	82	7	30	37	20	—	—	—	—	—
2014–15	Florida Panthers	NHL	82	3	24	27	22	—	—	—	—	—
2015–16	Florida Panthers	NHL	82	6	25	31	26	6	0	1	1	0
2016–17	Chicago Blackhawks	NHL	80	5	12	17	24	4	0	0	0	0
NHL totals			1,082	87	417	504	277	107	9	35	44	40

=== International ===
Year	Team	Event	GP	G	A	Pts	PIM
1999	Canada	WJC	7	1	1	2	4
2013	Canada	WC	8	0	2	2	0

== Awards ==
Awards	Year
OHL
George Parsons Trophy	1999
William Hanley Trophy	1999
Max Kaminsky Trophy	1999
Red Tilson Trophy	1999
OHL first All-Star team	1999
CHL Player of the Year	1999
AHL
AHL All-Star Game	2001
NHL
Stanley Cup champion	2010
NHL All-Star Game	2007, 2008, 2009, 2012
NHL second All-Star team	2008
Lady Byng Memorial Trophy	2012

Awards
Preceded by Sergei Varlamov	CHL Player of the Year; 1999	Succeeded by Brad Richards
Preceded by Martin St. Louis	Lady Byng Memorial Trophy winner 2012	Succeeded by Martin St. Louis
Sporting positions
Preceded by Toni Lydman	Buffalo Sabres captain December 2007	Succeeded by Jaroslav Špaček
