= 2007 National Hockey League All-Star Game =

Professional ice hockey exhibition game

2007 NHL All-Star Game
| | 1 | 2 | 3 | Total |
|---|---|---|---|---|
| East | 3 | 3 | 3 | 9 |
| West | 3 | 6 | 3 | 12 |
- Date: January 24, 2007
- Arena: American Airlines Center
- City: Dallas
- MVP: Daniel Briere (Buffalo)
- Attendance: 18,532

The 2007 National Hockey League All-Star Game was held in Dallas, on January 24, 2007. The Western Conference was victorious, defeating the Eastern Conference 12–9.

On January 23, 2006, NHL Commissioner Gary Bettman announced that the event to be held during the 2006–07 season would take place at American Airlines Center, home of the Dallas Stars. The Stars were hosting an All-Star Game for the first time since 1972, when they were known as the Minnesota North Stars. The starting lines for both conferences were announced on January 9, 2007, and the full rosters were announced January 13, 2007.

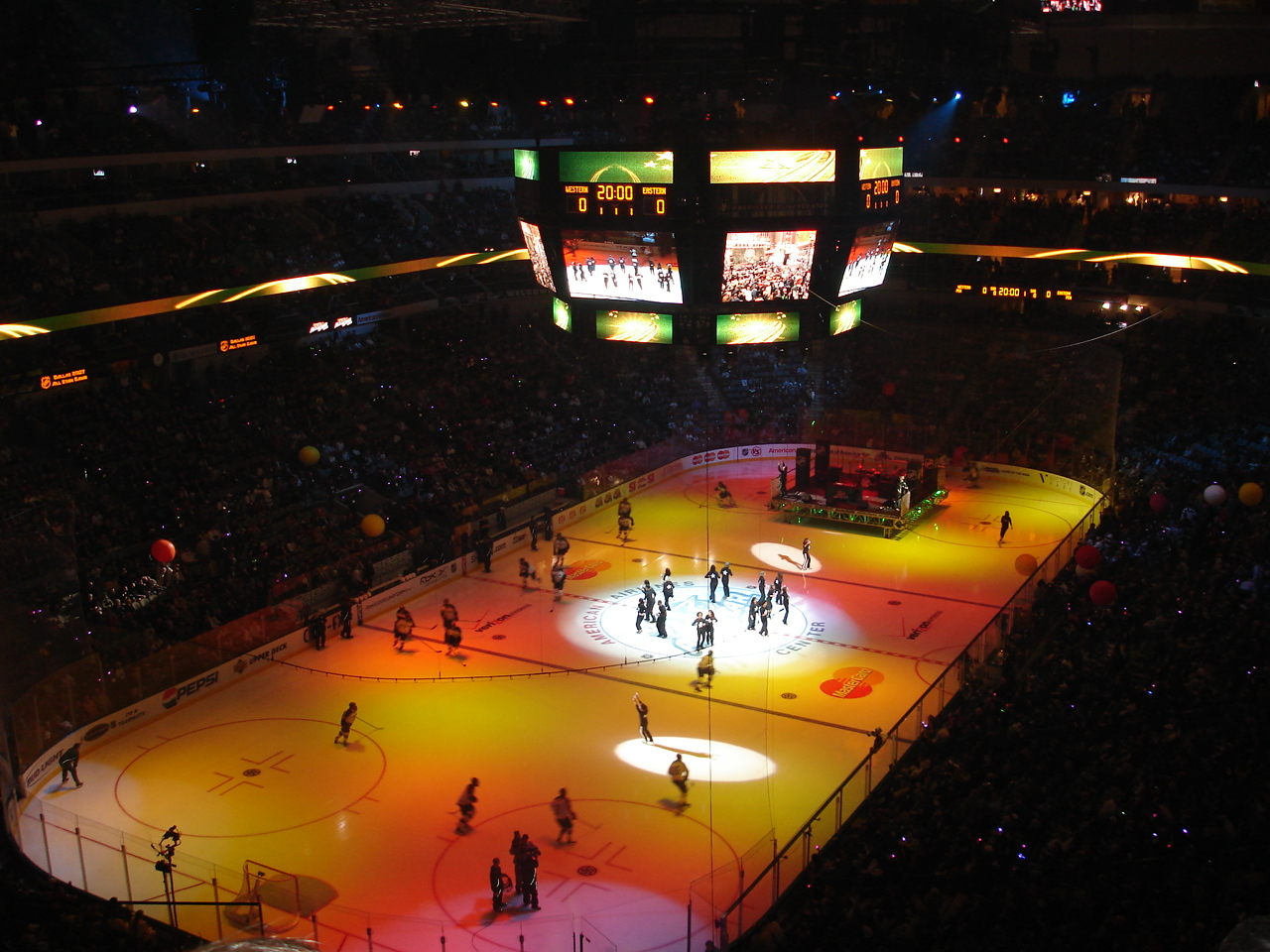
Pre-game warm-up

This event was broadcast by Versus, CBC and RDS.

== All-Star Game scheduling changes ==
Due to the 2004–05 NHL lockout, this was the first All-Star Game since 2004. The lockout had forced the cancellation of the entire 2004-05 NHL season, including the All-Star Game, which had been scheduled to be hosted by the Atlanta Thrashers. Following the adoption of a new collective bargaining agreement that ended the lockout, the league and the NHLPA agreed not to hold All-Star Games in the years they would send NHL players to the Winter Olympics. As this took immediate effect with the 2005–06 season, the 2006 game originally scheduled to be hosted by the Phoenix Coyotes was indefinitely postponed for the 2006 Winter Olympics. While Atlanta would get a make-up date in 2008, the Montreal Canadiens were already set to host in 2009 as part of the team's centennial celebrations, and 2010 would again be without a game due to the Olympics. Initially, it was planned for the Coyotes to host the 2011 game, but when the Coyotes entered a state of ownership instability, that game was awarded to the Carolina Hurricanes instead, and the Coyotes would never get to host the game before the franchise was suspended in 2024.

== Rory Fitzpatrick voting campaign ==
The fan voting process had been revised so as to allow fans to vote for their favorite players as many times as they wished. This had created a humorous fan voting campaign around Vancouver Canucks defenceman Rory Fitzpatrick, urging many to vote him into the game as a write-in candidate, designed to show that the revised system would lead to ballot box stuffing, in an effort to get the league to change the system. Despite having no points in 18 games and one point in 22 games, Fitzpatrick had surprisingly accumulated 428,832 votes, good for second-place (and a starting spot) among the defencemen when preliminary results were released. Reaction to the campaign was mixed—supporters of the campaign saw an opportunity to consider sending a hardworking but otherwise unspectacular player onto the all-star teams as recognition for their hard work, while opponents claim that it would take spots on the team away from players who generate interest in the league.

Among notable opponents of the campaign were Phoenix Coyotes head coach Wayne Gretzky as well as Hockey Night in Canada commentator Don Cherry. Ultimately, the campaign was unsuccessful, as Fitzpatrick finished third among Western Conference defencemen and was not named as an All-Star reserve. Slate suggested that Fitzpatrick had the requisite number of votes and that the NHL altered the results in reaction to ballot stuffing by an automatic script.

== New league-wide uniforms (Rbk EDGE) ==
Finally, the league chose to unveil the new Rbk EDGE uniform designs, which would be employed by all 30 teams in the following season. The new uniforms are designed to retain less water, potentially leading to less fatigue and improved performance. Similar designs have been employed in recent international hockey competitions. Critics of the new uniform design claim that the uniforms are more form-fitting than ever before, and that the new sweaters would not allow horizontal striping at the bottom of the sweater, a design that is a part of many current jerseys, including those of all six Original Six teams. However, some players have embraced the new uniforms, claiming that the new jerseys made them feel faster on the ice. The concerns over the striping would be alleviated with the league-wide rollout of the Edge system the following season, although several teams opted to go with non-traditional designs. In particular, the Ottawa Senators, Pittsburgh Penguins, and Tampa Bay Lightning would adopt new uniforms using a modified version of the template used for these All-Star uniforms. This year's All-Star design would be reused in the next game, albeit with some slight changes (including a running change to the Edge uniform's construction).

== Rosters ==
| | Eastern Conference | Western Conference |
| Coach | (Canada) Lindy Ruff (Buffalo Sabres) | (Canada) Randy Carlyle (Anaheim Ducks) |
| Assistant coach | (Canada) Bob Hartley (Atlanta Thrashers) | (Canada) Barry Trotz (Nashville Predators) |
|---|---|---|
| Lineup | Starters: (United States) 30 - G Ryan Miller (Buffalo Sabres); (Canada) 44 - D Sheldon Souray (Montreal Canadiens); (Canada) 51 - D Brian Campbell (Buffalo Sabres); (Russia) 8 - F Alexander Ovechkin (Washington Capitals); (Canada) 87 - F Sidney Crosby (Pittsburgh Penguins); (Canada) 48 - F Daniel Briere (Buffalo Sabres); Reserves: (Canada) 3 - D Jay Bouwmeester (Florida Panthers); (Canada) 4 - F Vincent Lecavalier (Tampa Bay Lightning); (Canada) 11 - F Justin Williams (Carolina Hurricanes); (Canada) 12 - F Simon Gagne (Philadelphia Flyers); (Canada) 14 - F Brendan Shanahan (New York Rangers) - (C); (Czech Republic) 15 - D Tomas Kaberle (Toronto Maple Leafs); (Canada) 16 - F Dany Heatley (Ottawa Senators); (Slovakia) 18 - F Marian Hossa (Atlanta Thrashers); (Canada) 21 - F Eric Staal (Carolina Hurricanes); (Canada) 26 - F Martin St. Louis (Tampa Bay Lightning); (United States) 28 - D Brian Rafalski (New Jersey Devils); (Canada) 30 - G Martin Brodeur (New Jersey Devils); (Slovakia) 33 - D Zdeno Chara (Boston Bruins); (France) 39 - G Cristobal Huet (Montreal Canadiens); (United States) 55 - F Jason Blake (New York Islanders) | Starters: (Canada) 1 - G Roberto Luongo (Vancouver Canucks); (Sweden) 5 - D Nicklas Lidstrom (Detroit Red Wings); (Canada) 43 - D Philippe Boucher* (Dallas Stars); (Canada) 14 - F Jonathan Cheechoo (San Jose Sharks); (Canada) 19 - F Joe Sakic (Colorado Avalanche) - (C); (Canada) 97 - F Joe Thornton (San Jose Sharks); Reserves: (Canada) 3 - D Dion Phaneuf (Calgary Flames); (Finland) 8 - F Teemu Selanne (Anaheim Ducks); (Canada) 10 - F Patrick Marleau (San Jose Sharks); (United States) 12 - F Brian Rolston (Minnesota Wild); (United States) 13 - F Bill Guerin (St. Louis Blues); (Slovakia) 17 - D Lubomir Visnovsky (Los Angeles Kings); (Canada) 20 - F Andy McDonald** (Anaheim Ducks); (Czech Republic) 24 - F Martin Havlat (Chicago Blackhawks); (Finland) 34 - G Miikka Kiprusoff (Calgary Flames); (Canada) 35 - G Marty Turco (Dallas Stars); (Finland) 44 - D Kimmo Timonen (Nashville Predators); (Canada) 55 - D Ed Jovanovski* (Phoenix Coyotes); (Canada) 61 - F Rick Nash (Columbus Blue Jackets); (Canada) 93 - F Ryan Smyth (Edmonton Oilers); (Canada) 94 - F Yanic Perreault (Phoenix Coyotes) |

Notes

- * Scott Niedermayer was voted to the West all-star team as a starter, but did not play. Ed Jovanovski was named as his replacement on the roster; Philippe Boucher was named his replacement in the starting lineup.
- ** Henrik Zetterberg was named to the West all-star team, but did not play. Andy McDonald was named as his replacement.

== Summary ==
| | Eastern Conference | Western Conference |
| Final score | 9 | 12 |
|---|---|---|
| Scoring | Briere (Heatley, Hossa) 3:38 first; St. Louis (Lecavalier, Rafalski) 13:07 first; Staal (Williams, Bouwmeester) 13:43 first; Williams (Blake) 5:19 second; Chara (Briere, Rafalski) 6:29 second; Ovechkin (Briere, Souray) 13:32 second; Heatley (Briere, Hossa) 2:01 third; Chara (Hossa, Briere) 10:37 third; Souray (Hossa) 19:25 third | Perreault (Rolston, Guerin) 5:08 first; Selanne 6:17 first; Visnovsky (Sakic, Nash) 18:55 first; Marleau (Cheechoo, Lidstrom) 2:41 second; Rolston 8:30 second; Nash (Sakic, Phaneuf) 10:40 second; Havlat (Sakic, Nash) 11:34 second; Perreault (Guerin, Rolston) 12:47 second; Rolston (Jovanovski) 18:58 second; Nash (Sakic, Havlat) 7:12 third; Havlat (Smyth, Jovanovski) 18:58 third; Phaneuf (Visnovsky) 19:48 (EN) third |
| Penalties | none | none |
| Shots on goal | 12–11–15–38 | 12–16–11–39 |
| Win/loss | L - Cristobal Huet | W - Marty Turco |

- Attendance: 18,532
- Referees: Greg Kimmerly, Mike Leggo
- Linesmen: Lonnie Cameron, Jay Sharrers
- MVP: Daniel Briere
