= 2007–08 Edmonton Oilers season =

NHL team season

2007–08 Edmonton Oilers
- Division: 4th Northwest
- Conference: 9th Western
- 2007–08 record: 41–35–6
- Home record: 23–17–1
- Road record: 18–18–5
- Goals for: 235
- Goals against: 251

Team information
- General manager: Kevin Lowe
- Coach: Craig MacTavish
- Captain: Ethan Moreau
- Alternate captains: Ales Hemsky; Shawn Horcoff; Steve Staios; Jarret Stoll
- Arena: Rexall Place
- Average attendance: 16,839 (100%)
- Minor league affiliates: Springfield Falcons (AHL); Stockton Thunder (ECHL)

Team leaders
- Goals: Dustin Penner (23)
- Assists: Ales Hemsky (51)
- Points: Ales Hemsky (71)
- Penalty minutes: Zack Stortini (201)
- Plus/minus: Robert Nilsson (+8)
- Wins: Mathieu Garon (26)
- Goals against average: Mathieu Garon (2.66)

The 2007–08 Edmonton Oilers season began on October 4, 2007. It was the Oilers' 36th season and the 29th of which it has been participating in the National Hockey League (NHL). This season also marks the debut of the Edmonton Oil Kings, a Western Hockey League expansion team purchased by the Oilers after the team spent several years attempting to buy and relocate any existing WHL team to Edmonton. The team would miss the playoffs for the second year in a row for the first time since the 1994–95 season and the 1995–96 season.

== 2007 off-season ==
With major rebuilding necessary, the Oilers began the NHL free agency period on July 1, trading Joffrey Lupul and Jason Smith to the Philadelphia Flyers for defencemen Joni Pitkanen, left winger Geoff Sanderson and a third-round pick in the 2009 NHL entry draft.

Petr Sykora, having become a free agent, left the Oilers franchise and signed with the Pittsburgh Penguins. Jan Hejda, also a free agent, left for the Columbus Blue Jackets.

The Oilers made a call to Ryan Smyth's agent early in the morning on July 1 stating they were interested in making an offer. Smyth wound up signing with the Colorado Avalanche.

Goaltender Mathieu Garon was signed on July 3, 2007, as the backup to Dwayne Roloson.

It has also been reported that the Oilers had agreed to a contract with free agent Michael Nylander through his agent. While the Oilers were expecting a signed contract from Nylander and his agent, they later found out that he had signed with the Washington Capitals instead. The Oilers are currently pursuing their legal options on the matter.

Matt Greene and Raffi Torres signed two- and three-year contracts, respectfully.

On July 5, the Oilers offered restricted free agent Thomas Vanek from the Buffalo Sabres a seven-year contract worth $50 million. The Buffalo Sabres quickly matched the Oilers offer.

On July 12, the Oilers signed unrestricted free agent Sheldon Souray to a five-year, $27 million deal.

On July 20, the Oilers signed Newly acquired defenceman Joni Pitkanen to a one-year, $2.4 million deal.

On July 26, the Oilers offered Anaheim Ducks forward Dustin Penner, a restricted free agent $21.25 million over five years; this is the second restricted free agent the Oilers have attempted to sign this off-season. The Ducks declined to match the offer, officially making Penner an Oiler.

On October 2, 2007, the Oilers announced Ethan Moreau as the 15th captain in team history.

== 2007–08 regular season ==
On February 19, 2008, Denis Grebeshkov scored the Oilers' 8,000th goal in franchise history.

On February 26, 2008, the Edmonton Oilers set a new NHL record for 13 shootout wins in a season, previously held by the Dallas Stars, at 12 wins. Oilers goaltender Mathieu Garon has stopped 30 of 32 shots and is 10–0 in shootouts.

On March 4, 2008, Gilbert surpassed Paul Coffey and Marc-Andre Bergeron for the Oilers' franchise record for most goals scored by a rookie defencemen with his tenth goal on the power play against the Nashville Predators goaltender Dan Ellis.

On March 18, 2008, the Oilers scored eight goals for the first time in five years in an 8–4 win over the Phoenix Coyotes.

The Oilers failed to qualify for the playoffs for the second consecutive season.

== Regular season ==
=== Divisional standings ===
Northwest Division
		GP	W	L	OTL	GF	GA	Pts
**1**	**y – Minnesota Wild**	**82**	**44**	**28**	**10**	**223**	**218**	**98**
**2**	**Colorado Avalanche**	**82**	**44**	**31**	**7**	**231**	**219**	**95**
**3**	**Calgary Flames**	**82**	**42**	**30**	**10**	**229**	**227**	**94**
4	Edmonton Oilers	82	41	35	6	235	251	88
5	Vancouver Canucks	82	39	33	10	213	215	88

=== Conference standings ===
Western Conference
R		Div	GP	W	L	OTL	GF	GA	Pts
**1**	**p – Detroit Red Wings**	**CE**	**82**	**54**	**21**	**7**	**257**	**184**	115
**2**	**y – San Jose Sharks**	**PA**	**82**	**49**	**23**	**10**	**222**	**193**	108
**3**	**y – Minnesota Wild**	**NW**	**82**	**44**	**28**	**10**	**223**	**218**	98
**4**	**Anaheim Ducks**	**PA**	**82**	**47**	**27**	**8**	**205**	**191**	102
**5**	**Dallas Stars**	**PA**	**82**	**45**	**30**	**7**	**242**	**207**	97
**6**	**Colorado Avalanche**	**NW**	**82**	**44**	**31**	**7**	**231**	**219**	95
**7**	**Calgary Flames**	**NW**	**82**	**42**	**30**	**10**	**229**	**227**	94
**8**	**Nashville Predators**	**CE**	**82**	**41**	**32**	**9**	**230**	**229**	91
8.5
9	Edmonton Oilers	NW	82	41	35	6	235	251	88
10	Chicago Blackhawks	CE	82	40	34	8	239	235	88
11	Vancouver Canucks	NW	82	39	33	10	213	215	88
12	Phoenix Coyotes	PA	82	38	37	7	214	231	83
13	Columbus Blue Jackets	CE	82	34	36	12	193	218	80
14	St. Louis Blues	CE	82	33	36	13	205	237	79
15	Los Angeles Kings	PA	82	32	43	7	231	266	71

Divisions: PA – Pacific, CE – Central, NW – Northwest
bold – qualified for playoffs, y – division winner, p – Presidents' Trophy winner

== Schedule and results ==
2007–08 regular season
October: 5–8–0 (home: 3–3–0; road: 2–5–0)

Game	Date	Visitor	Score	Home	OT	Decision	Attendance	Record	Points	Recap
1	October 4	San Jose Sharks	2 – 3	Edmonton Oilers	SO	Roloson	16,839	1–0–0	2	W
2	October 6	Philadelphia Flyers	3 – 5	Edmonton Oilers		Garon	16,839	2–0–0	4	W
3	October 8	Edmonton Oilers	2 – 4	Detroit Red Wings		Roloson	16,913	2–1–0	4	L
4	October 10	Edmonton Oilers	0 – 2	Minnesota Wild		Roloson	18,568	2–2–0	4	L
5	October 12	Vancouver Canucks	5 – 2	Edmonton Oilers		Garon	16,839	2–3–0	4	L
6	October 13	Edmonton Oilers	1 – 4	Vancouver Canucks		Roloson	18,630	2–4–0	4	L
7	October 18	Edmonton Oilers	4 – 2	Phoenix Coyotes		Roloson	10,448	3–4–0	6	W
8	October 20	Edmonton Oilers	1 – 4	Calgary Flames		Roloson	19,289	3–5–0	6	L
9	October 23	Colorado Avalanche	4 – 2	Edmonton Oilers		Roloson	16,839	3–6–0	6	L
10	October 25	Minnesota Wild	4 – 5	Edmonton Oilers	SO	Roloson	16,839	4–6–0	8	W
11	October 27	Edmonton Oilers	1 – 4	Los Angeles Kings		Roloson	16,173	4–7–0	8	L
12	October 28	Edmonton Oilers	3 – 2	Anaheim Ducks	SO	Garon	17,174	5–7–0	10	W
13	October 30	Detroit Red Wings	2 – 1	Edmonton Oilers		Roloson	16,839	5–8–0	10	L

November: 6–6–1 (home: 4–4–0; road: 2–2–1)

Game	Date	Visitor	Score	Home	OT	Decision	Attendance	Record	Points	Recap
14	November 2	Nashville Predators	4 – 1	Edmonton Oilers		Garon	16,839	5–9–0	10	L
15	November 5	Edmonton Oilers	2 – 5	Minnesota Wild		Roloson	18,568	5–10–0	10	L
16	November 7	Edmonton Oilers	3 – 4	Colorado Avalanche	SO	Roloson	15,877	5–10–1	11	OTL
17	November 10	Edmonton Oilers	4 – 2	Calgary Flames		Garon	19,289	6–10–1	13	W
18	November 14	Edmonton Oilers	1 – 0	Vancouver Canucks	SO	Garon	18,630	7–10–1	15	W
19	November 15	Minnesota Wild	4 – 2	Edmonton Oilers		Roloson	16,839	7–11–1	15	L
20	November 17	Calgary Flames	3 – 1	Edmonton Oilers		Garon	16,839	7–12–1	15	L
21	November 20	Vancouver Canucks	4 – 5	Edmonton Oilers	SO	Garon	16,839	8–12–1	17	W
22	November 22	Colorado Avalanche	3 – 2	Edmonton Oilers		Garon	16,839	8–13–1	17	L
23	November 24	Chicago Blackhawks	2 – 3	Edmonton Oilers	SO	Roloson	16,839	9–13–1	19	W
24	November 26	Columbus Blue Jackets	1 – 3	Edmonton Oilers		Roloson	16,839	10–13–1	21	W
25	November 28	Edmonton Oilers	2 – 4	Colorado Avalanche		Roloson	15,128	10–14–1	21	L
26	November 30	Anaheim Ducks	1 – 5	Edmonton Oilers		Roloson	16,839	11–14–1	23	W

December: 5–6–3 (home: 1–4–1; road: 4–2–2)

Game	Date	Visitor	Score	Home	OT	Decision	Attendance	Record	Points	Recap
27	December 2	Edmonton Oilers	4 – 0	Anaheim Ducks		Garon	17,174	12–14–1	25	W
28	December 3	Edmonton Oilers	4 – 3	Los Angeles Kings	SO	Garon	14,193	13–14–1	27	W
29	December 5	Pittsburgh Penguins	4 – 2	Edmonton Oilers		Roloson	16,839	13–15–1	27	L
30	December 7	St. Louis Blues	4 – 3	Edmonton Oilers		Garon	16,839	13–16–1	27	L
31	December 10	Edmonton Oilers	4 – 5	Dallas Stars	OT	Garon	17,833	13–16–2	28	OTL
32	December 11	Edmonton Oilers	5 – 4	St. Louis Blues	SO	Garon	14,329	14–16–2	30	W
33	December 13	Edmonton Oilers	4 – 3	Detroit Red Wings	SO	Roloson	18,859	15–16–2	32	W
34	December 15	Vancouver Canucks	1 – 2	Edmonton Oilers	SO	Garon	16,839	16–16–2	34	W
35	December 18	Dallas Stars	2 – 1	Edmonton Oilers	SO	Roloson	16,839	16–16–3	35	OTL
36	December 21	New Jersey Devils	3 – 1	Edmonton Oilers		Garon	16,839	16–17–3	35	L
37	December 23	Edmonton Oilers	2 – 3	Chicago Blackhawks		Garon	20,151	16–18–3	35	L
38	December 27	Anaheim Ducks	2 – 1	Edmonton Oilers		Garon	16,839	16–19–3	35	L
39	December 29	Edmonton Oilers	4 – 5	Minnesota Wild	OT	Roloson	18,568	16–19–4	36	OTL
40	December 31	Edmonton Oilers	2 – 4	Columbus Blue Jackets		Garon	16,774	16–20–4	36	L

January: 7–5–1 (home: 4–2–0; road: 3–3–1)

Game	Date	Visitor	Score	Home	OT	Decision	Attendance	Record	Points	Recap
41	January 2	Edmonton Oilers	3 – 2	St. Louis Blues	OT	Garon	14,465	17–20–4	38	W
42	January 3	Edmonton Oilers	2 – 5	Nashville Predators		Garon	12,676	17–21–4	38	L
43	January 5	New York Rangers	2 – 3	Edmonton Oilers	SO	Garon	16,839	18–21–4	40	W
44	January 7	New York Islanders	0 – 4	Edmonton Oilers		Garon	16,839	19–21–4	42	W
45	January 10	Phoenix Coyotes	2 – 5	Edmonton Oilers		Garon	16,839	20–21–4	44	W
46	January 13	Calgary Flames	1 – 2	Edmonton Oilers		Garon	16,839	21–21–4	46	W
47	January 15	Los Angeles Kings	3 – 1	Edmonton Oilers		Garon	16,839	21–22–4	46	L
48	January 17	Edmonton Oilers	4 – 5	Washington Capitals	SO	Roloson	13,399	21–22–5	47	OTL
49	January 18	Edmonton Oilers	2 – 7	Carolina Hurricanes		Garon	16,868	21–23–5	47	L
50	January 20	Edmonton Oilers	4 – 2	Atlanta Thrashers		Roloson	16,683	22–23–5	49	W
51	January 22	Edmonton Oilers	3 – 4	Tampa Bay Lightning		Roloson	16,799	22–24–5	49	L
52	January 24	Edmonton Oilers	4 – 3	Florida Panthers	SO	Garon	12,322	23–24–5	51	W
53	January 29	San Jose Sharks	3 – 0	Edmonton Oilers		Garon	16,839	23–25–5	51	L

February: 7–5–0 (home: 6–1–0; road: 1–4–0)

Game	Date	Visitor	Score	Home	OT	Decision	Attendance	Record	Points	Recap
54	February 1	Dallas Stars	4 – 1	Edmonton Oilers		Roloson	16,839	23–26–5	51	L
55	February 4	Calgary Flames	0 – 5	Edmonton Oilers		Garon	16,839	24–26–5	53	W
56	February 6	Chicago Blackhawks	1 – 4	Edmonton Oilers		Garon	16,839	25–26–5	55	W
57	February 9	Edmonton Oilers	1 – 4	Calgary Flames		Garon	19,289	25–27–5	55	L
58	February 12	Minnesota Wild	2 – 4	Edmonton Oilers		Garon	16,839	26–27–5	57	W
59	February 14	Edmonton Oilers	3 – 2	San Jose Sharks		Garon	17,496	27–27–5	59	W
60	February 16	Edmonton Oilers	2 – 4	Vancouver Canucks		Garon	18,630	27–28–5	59	L
61	February 19	Edmonton Oilers	4 – 5	Nashville Predators		Garon	13,466	27–29–5	59	L
62	February 22	Edmonton Oilers	2 – 5	Dallas Stars		Garon	18,564	27–30–5	59	L
63	February 24	Colorado Avalanche	2 – 3	Edmonton Oilers		Garon	16,839	28–30–5	61	W
64	February 26	Detroit Red Wings	3 – 4	Edmonton Oilers	SO	Garon	16,839	29–30–5	63	W
65	February 28	Los Angeles Kings	4 – 5	Edmonton Oilers		Garon	16,839	30–30–5	65	W

March: 10–4–1 (home: 5–2–0; road: 5–2–1)

Game	Date	Visitor	Score	Home	OT	Decision	Attendance	Record	Points	Recap
66	March 2	Columbus Blue Jackets	3 – 4	Edmonton Oilers	SO	Garon	16,839	31–30–5	67	W
67	March 4	Nashville Predators	5 – 1	Edmonton Oilers		Garon	16,839	31–31–5	67	L
68	March 7	Edmonton Oilers	2 – 1	Columbus Blue Jackets	OT	Garon	17,289	32–31–5	69	W
69	March 9	Edmonton Oilers	6 – 5	Chicago Blackhawks	OT	Garon	18,859	33–31–5	71	W
70	March 11	St. Louis Blues	3 – 4	Edmonton Oilers	OT	Garon	16,839	34–31–5	73	W
71	March 13	Edmonton Oilers	1 – 5	Colorado Avalanche		Garon	18,007	34–32–5	73	L
72	March 15	Edmonton Oilers	5 – 2	Phoenix Coyotes		Roloson	15,698	35–32–5	75	W
73	March 16	Edmonton Oilers	2 – 1	San Jose Sharks	SO	Roloson	16,987	36–32–5	77	W
74	March 18	Phoenix Coyotes	4 – 8	Edmonton Oilers		Roloson	16,839	37–32–5	79	W
75	March 20	Vancouver Canucks	4 – 1	Edmonton Oilers		Roloson	16,839	37–33–5	79	L
76	March 22	Colorado Avalanche	5 – 7	Edmonton Oilers		Roloson	16,839	38–33–5	81	W
77	March 24	Minnesota Wild	3 – 5	Edmonton Oilers		Roloson	16,839	39–33–5	83	W
78	March 26	Edmonton Oilers	1 – 3	Minnesota Wild		Roloson	17,978	39–34–5	83	L
79	March 28	Edmonton Oilers	4 – 5	Colorado Avalanche	SO	Roloson	17,846	39–34–6	84	OTL
80	March 29	Edmonton Oilers	2 – 1	Calgary Flames		Roloson	16,984	40–34–6	86	W

April: 1–1–0 (home: 0–1–0; road: 1–0–0)

Game	Date	Visitor	Score	Home	OT	Decision	Attendance	Record	Points	Recap
81	April 1	Calgary Flames	3 – 2	Edmonton Oilers		Roloson	16,839	40–35–6	86	L
82	April 3	Edmonton Oilers	2 – 1	Vancouver Canucks		Roloson	18,630	41–35–6	88	W

Legend: W Win (2 points) L Loss (0 points) OTL Overtime/shootout loss (1 point)

== Player statistics ==
=== Skaters ===
Note: GP = Games played; G = Goals; A = Assists; Pts = Points; PIM = Penalty minutes

	Regular season					Playoffs
Player	GP	G	A	Pts	PIM	GP	G	A	Pts	PIM
Ales Hemsky	74	20	51	71	34
Shawn Horcoff	53	21	29	50	30
Sam Gagner	79	13	36	49	23
Dustin Penner	82	23	24	47	45
Andrew Cogliano	82	18	27	45	20
Robert Nilsson	71	10	31	41	22
Jarret Stoll	81	14	22	36	74
Tom Gilbert	82	13	20	33	20
Kyle Brodziak	80	14	17	31	33
Joni Pitkanen	63	8	18	26	56
Marty Reasoner	82	11	14	25	50
Curtis Glencross	62	15	10	25	53

=== Goaltenders ===
Note: GP = Games played; TOI = Time on ice (minutes); W = Wins; L = Losses; OT = Overtime/shootout losses; GA = Goals against; SO = Shutouts; SV% = Save percentage; GAA = Goals against average

	Regular season									Playoffs
Player	GP	TOI	W	L	OT	GA	SO	SV%	GAA	GP	TOI	W	L	GA	SO	SV%	GAA
Mathieu Garon	47	2658	26	18	1	118	4	.913	2.66
Dwayne Roloson	41	2222	14	16	5	115	0	.900	3.11

== Awards and records ==
=== Records ===
- 18 Years, 55 Days: New Oilers records for the youngest player ever played and earned his first NHL point, assisting on Tom Gilbert's goal, by Sam Gagner on October 4, 2007.
  - Note: Wayne Gretzky had an unofficial Oilers record for the youngest player ever played in franchise history, including WHA, at age 17 Years, 281 Days on November 3, 1978.
- 18 Years, 71 Days: A new Oilers record for the youngest player ever scored by Sam Gagner on October 20, 2007.
- 4: A new NHL record for most consecutive shootouts on December 18, 2007.
- 8: A new Oilers record for most consecutive game assist for rookies by Sam Gagner on February 22, 2008.
- 15: NHL record for most shootout wins in a season.
  - 13: A new NHL team record for most shootout wins in a season on February 26, 2008.
- 13: Oilers record for most goals for a rookie defenseman by Tom Gilbert.
  - 10: A new Oilers record for most goals for a rookie defenseman on March 4, 2008.
- 3: A new NHL record for most consecutive overtime goals by Andrew Cogliano on March 11, 2008.
- 33: A new Oilers record for most points for a rookie defenseman by Tom Gilbert on March 28, 2008.
- 19: A new NHL record for most shootouts in a season on March 28, 2008.

=== Milestones ===
Regular season
Player	Milestone	Reached
Andrew Cogliano	1st NHL Game; 1st NHL Assist; 1st NHL Point	October 4, 2007
Sam Gagner	1st NHL Game; 1st NHL Assist; 1st NHL Point	October 4, 2007
Shawn Horcoff	300th NHL PIM	October 6, 2007
Marty Reasoner	100th NHL Assist	October 6, 2007
Andrew Cogliano	1st NHL Goal	October 8, 2007
Geoff Sanderson	500th NHL PIM	October 13, 2007
Kyle Brodziak	1st NHL Assist	October 18, 2007
Sam Gagner	1st NHL Goal	October 20, 2007
Ales Hemsky	200th NHL Point	October 25, 2007
Marty Reasoner	400th NHL Game	November 10, 2007
Steve Staios	700th NHL Game	November 24, 2007
Ales Hemsky	300th NHL Game	November 28, 2007
Raffi Torres	300th NHL Game	November 28, 2007
Zack Stortini	1st NHL Assist	November 28, 2007
Liam Reddox	1st NHL Game	December 7, 2007
Ladislav Smid	100th NHL Game	December 11, 2007
Steve Staios	1,000th NHL PIM	December 18, 2007
Jarret Stoll	200th NHL PIM	January 5, 2008
Shawn Horcoff	100th NHL Goal	January 7, 2008
Denis Grebeshkov	1st NHL Goal	January 10, 2008
Zack Stortini	200th NHL PIM	January 10, 2008
Ethan Moreau	700th NHL Game	January 29, 2008
Robert Nilsson	100th NHL Game	January 29, 2008
Jarret Stoll	100th NHL Assist	February 4, 2008
Joni Pitkanen	100th NHL Assist	February 6, 2008
Dustin Penner	100th NHL PIM	February 9, 2008
Fernando Pisani	300th NHL Game	February 12, 2008
Geoff Sanderson	1,100th NHL Game	February 26, 2008
Mathieu Roy	1st NHL Assist	February 28, 2008
Geoff Sanderson	700th NHL Point	February 28, 2008
Theo Peckham	1st NHL Game	March 7, 2008
Matt Greene	200th NHL PIM	March 22, 2008
Denis Grebeshkov	100th NHL Game	March 26, 2008
Zack Stortini	300th NHL PIM	March 29, 2008

== Transactions ==
The Oilers have been involved in the following transactions during the 2007–08 season.

=== Trades ===
June 22, 2007	To Phoenix Coyotes 1st round pick in 2007; 2nd round pick in 2007	To Edmonton Oilers 1st round pick in 2007
July 1, 2007	To Philadelphia Flyers Jason Smith; Joffrey Lupul	To Edmonton Oilers Geoff Sanderson; Joni Pitkanen; 3rd round pick in 2009
July 5, 2007	To New York Islanders 2nd round pick in 2008	To Edmonton Oilers Allan Rourke; 3rd round pick in 2008
February 1, 2008	To Columbus Blue Jackets Dick Tarnstrom	To Edmonton Oilers Curtis Glencross

=== Free agents acquired ===
Date	Player	Former team	Term
July 3, 2007	Mathieu Garon	Los Angeles Kings	2 years, $2.2 million
July 12, 2007	Sheldon Souray	Montreal Canadiens	5 years, $27 million
July 17, 2007	Ryan Flinn	Los Angeles Kings	1 year, $450,000
July 17, 2007	T. J. Kemp	Manchester Monarchs (AHL)	1 year
July 25, 2007	Ben Simon	Syracuse Crunch (AHL)	1 year
August 2, 2007	Dustin Penner	Anaheim Ducks	5 years, $21.25 million
April 1, 2008	Bryan Lerg	Michigan State Spartans (CCHA)	2 years

=== Free agents lost ===
Date	Player	New team	Term
July 2, 2007	Petr Sykora	Pittsburgh Penguins	2 years, $5 million
July 5, 2007	Jan Hejda	Columbus Blue Jackets	1 year, $1 million
July 6, 2007	Toby Petersen	Dallas Stars	1 year
July 6, 2007	Brad Winchester	Dallas Stars	1 year, $475,000
July 19, 2007	Petr Nedved	Sparta Praha (Czech Extraliga)	
May 27, 2008	Allan Rourke	ERC Ingolstadt (DEL)	

=== Waivers ===
Date	Player	Team
February 22, 2008	Patrick Thoresen	to Philadelphia Flyers

=== Players re-signed ===
Player	Contract terms
F Ethan Moreau	4 years, $10 million (extension)
D Steve Staios	4 years, $10.8 million (extension)
D Denis Grebeshkov	1 year, $950,000
F Raffi Torres	3 years, $6.75 million
D Matt Greene	2 years, $2.3 million
D Joni Pitkanen	1 year, $2.4 million
D Mathieu Roy	2 years, $1 million
F Kyle Brodziak	2 years, $995,000

=== Draft picks ===
Edmonton's picks at the 2007 NHL entry draft in Columbus, Ohio. The Oilers have three first round selections in this draft: sixth overall, the 15th pick, acquired in the Ryan Smyth trade, and the 30th pick, acquired in the Chris Pronger trade.

Round	#	Player	Nationality	NHL team	College/junior/club team (league)
1	6	Sam Gagner (C/W)	Canada	Edmonton Oilers	London Knights (OHL)
1	15	Alex Plante (D)	Canada	Edmonton Oilers (from New York Islanders)	Calgary Hitmen (WHL)
1	21	Riley Nash (C)	Canada	Edmonton Oilers (from Dallas Stars via Phoenix Coyotes)	Salmon Arm Silverbacks (BCHL)
4	97	Linus Omark (W)	Sweden	Edmonton Oilers	Luleå HF (Elitserien)
5	127	Milan Kytnar (C)	Slovakia	Edmonton Oilers	HC Topoľčany (Slovak-2)
6	157	William Quist (W)	Sweden	Edmonton Oilers	Tingsryds AIF (Sweden-3)

== Farm teams ==
=== Springfield Falcons ===
After shipping their prospects out across several clubs, the Oilers have signed a deal with the Springfield Falcons to be their American Hockey League (AHL) affiliate in 2007–08. The Falcons will be the Oilers first full-time AHL affiliate since the Edmonton Road Runners were suspended following the 2004–05 season.

=== Stockton Thunder ===
The Stockton Thunder of the ECHL remain Edmonton's secondary affiliate.

== See also ==
- 2006–07 NHL season
