= Jamie Wright =

Canadian ice hockey player

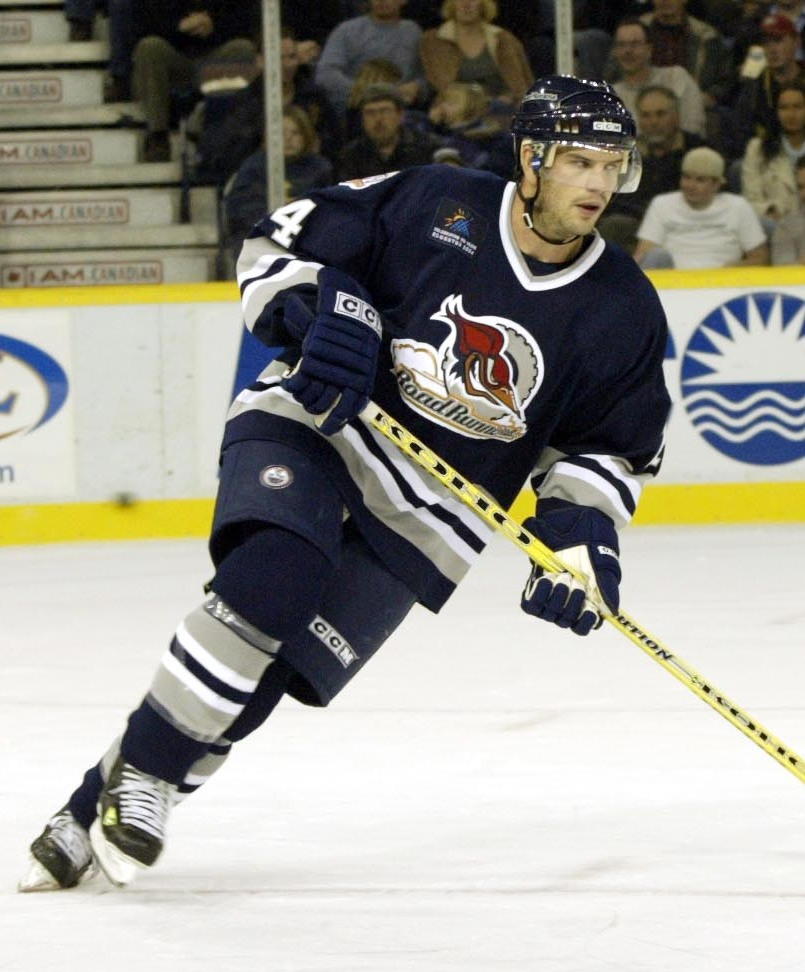
- Wright with the Edmonton Road Runners in 2004
- Born: May 13, 1976 (age 49) Kitchener, Ontario, Canada
- Height: 6 ft 0 in (183 cm)
- Weight: 196 lb (89 kg; 14 st 0 lb)
- Position: Left wing
- Shot: Left
- Played for: Dallas Stars; Calgary Flames; Philadelphia Flyers; Lukko; Genève-Servette HC; DEG Metro Stars; Frankfurt Lions; EHC Basel
- National team: Canada
- NHL draft: 98th overall, 1994; Dallas Stars
- Playing career: 1996–2013

Jamie Wright (born May 13, 1976) is a Canadian former professional ice hockey left winger who played in the National Hockey League (NHL) with the Dallas Stars, Calgary Flames and Philadelphia Flyers. Wright was born in Kitchener, Ontario, but grew up in Elmira, Ontario.

== Playing career ==
Wright was selected 98th overall by the Dallas Stars in the 1994 NHL entry draft. Wright has played 124 career NHL games, scoring 12 goals and 20 assists for 32 points. He also played for team Canada in the 1996 World Junior Championships in Boston, scoring one goal and two assists in the tournament.

== Career statistics ==
			Regular season					Playoffs
Season	Team	League	GP	G	A	Pts	PIM	GP	G	A	Pts	PIM
1993–94	Guelph Storm	OHL	65	17	15	32	34	8	2	1	3	10
1994–95	Guelph Storm	OHL	65	43	39	82	36	14	6	8	14	6
1995–96	Guelph Storm	OHL	55	30	36	66	45	16	10	12	22	35
1996–97	Michigan K-Wings	IHL	60	6	8	14	34	1	0	0	0	0
1997–98	Michigan K-Wings	IHL	53	15	11	26	31	—	—	—	—	—
1997–98	Dallas Stars	NHL	21	4	2	6	2	5	0	0	0	0
1998–99	Michigan K-Wings	IHL	64	16	15	31	92	2	0	0	0	2
1998–99	Dallas Stars	NHL	11	0	0	0	0	—	—	—	—	—
1999–00	Michigan K-Wings	IHL	49	12	4	16	64	—	—	—	—	—
1999–00	Dallas Stars	NHL	23	1	4	5	16	—	—	—	—	—
2000–01	Dallas Stars	NHL	2	1	0	1	0	—	—	—	—	—
2001–02	Calgary Flames	NHL	44	4	12	16	20	—	—	—	—	—
2001–02	Saint John Flames	AHL	34	11	13	24	34	—	—	—	—	—
2002–03	Calgary Flames	NHL	19	2	2	4	12	—	—	—	—	—
2002–03	Saint John Flames	AHL	3	2	1	3	0	—	—	—	—	—
2002–03	Philadelphia Flyers	NHL	4	0	0	0	4	—	—	—	—	—
2002–03	Philadelphia Phantoms	AHL	33	10	14	24	31	—	—	—	—	—
2003–04	Toronto Roadrunners	AHL	78	25	30	55	101	—	—	—	—	—
2004–05	Edmonton Road Runners	AHL	65	13	15	28	86	—	—	—	—	—
2005–06	Lukko	Liiga	44	12	18	30	73	—	—	—	—	—
2006–07	Genève-Servette HC	NLA	40	19	19	38	18	—	—	—	—	—
2007–08	DEG Metro Stars	DEL	55	19	29	48	77	13	3	6	9	24
2008–09	Frankfurt Lions	DEL	32	4	7	11	26	5	0	0	0	0
2009–10	Frankfurt Lions	DEL	29	8	14	22	22	4	0	3	3	0
2009–10	HC Sierre	NLB	10	5	10	15	20	—	—	—	—	—
2010–11	EHC Basel	NLB	45	14	34	48	44	—	—	—	—	—
2011–12	EHC Basel	NLB	30	7	17	24	24	—	—	—	—	—
2012–13	EHC Basel	NLB	46	11	22	33	40	—	—	—	—	—
NHL totals			124	12	20	32	54	5	0	0	0	0
