= Sean McAslan =

Canadian ice hockey player (born 1980)

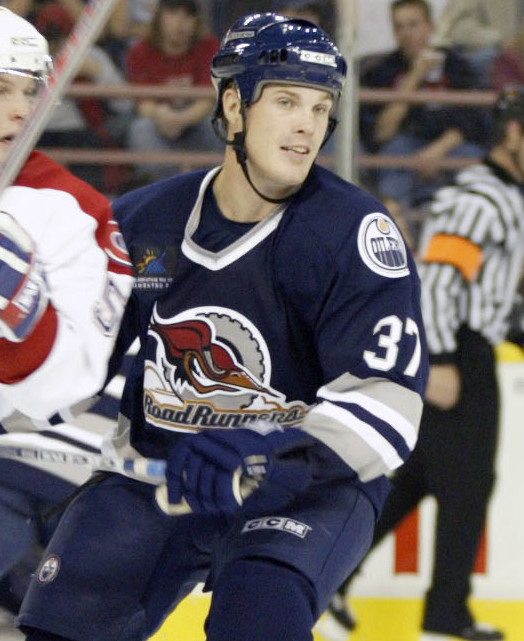
- McAslan with the Edmonton Road Runners in 2004
- Born: January 12, 1980 (age 45); Okotoks, Alberta, Canada
- Height: 6 ft 1 in (185 cm)
- Weight: 192 lb (87 kg; 13 st 10 lb)
- Position: Right Wing
- Shoots: Right
- EIHL team: Nottingham Panthers
- Playing career: 1996–present

Sean McAslan (born January 12, 1980) is a Canadian former ice hockey player who last played for the Nottingham Panthers in the UK.

== Career ==
=== Early career ===
McAslan started his career in Calgary playing for Calgary Hitmen in Western Hockey League (WHL) for five seasons between 1996 and 2001. In 2001 he moved to the ECHL playing for Columbus Cottonmouths whilst having a brief stint in the American Hockey League (AHL) playing for Hamilton Bulldogs.

=== AHL and ECHL career ===
During the 2003–04 and 2004–05 McAslan played in the AHL for Toronto Roadrunners and Edmonton Roadrunners. He then moved to Long Beach Ice Dogs of the ECHL, scoring 28 goals and 28 assists making 56 points in total, whilst spending 106 minutes in the penalty box. He also had another brief stint in the AHL with Milwaukee Admirals playing two regular season games and 14 playoff games.

=== EIHL career ===
In 2006 McAslan signed for the Nottingham Panthers of the EIHL, scoring 44 goals and 22 assists. He also made the EIHL second All Star team. Season 2007–08 was also spent with the Nottingham Panthers and he was made captain by coach Mike Ellis during a pre-season tour of France, winning the Epinal Tournament. Later in the season he lifted the Elite League's Challenge Cup beating their arch rivals, the Sheffield Steelers, 9–7 over two legs. He left the Panthers at the end of the 2007/08 season to join Rodovre in the Danish League. In May 2009 it was announced that McAslan would return to the Nottingham Panthers to join their 09/10 championship campaign declaring that he had 'unfinished business' with British Ice Hockey's best supported outfit.

== Career statistics ==
			Regular season					Playoffs
Season	Team	League	GP	G	A	Pts	PIM	GP	G	A	Pts	PIM
1996–97	Calgary Hitmen	WHL	26	2	3	5	22	—	—	—	—	—
1997–98	Calgary Hitmen	WHL	69	8	16	24	83	18	0	0	0	23
1998–99	Calgary Hitmen	WHL	71	7	16	23	110	21	2	1	3	18
1999–00	Calgary Hitmen	WHL	72	18	16	34	117	13	4	2	6	49
2000–01	Calgary Hitmen	WHL	51	21	32	53	137	12	3	5	8	29
2001–02	Columbus Cottonmouths	ECHL	72	16	21	37	139	—	—	—	—	—
2001–02	Hamilton Bulldogs	AHL	1	0	0	0	0	—	—	—	—	—
2002–03	Columbus Cottonmouths	ECHL	53	15	17	32	132	—	—	—	—	—
2003–04	Toronto Roadrunners	AHL	62	12	15	27	66	3	0	1	1	2
2004–05	Edmonton Roadrunners	AHL	64	6	5	11	61	—	—	—	—	—
2005–06	Long Beach Ice Dogs	ECHL	66	28	28	56	107	7	5	3	8	31
2005–06	Milwaukee Admirals	AHL	2	0	0	0	0	14	1	0	1	6
2006–07	Nottingham Panthers	EIHL	50	42	27	69	77	4	2	1	3	18
2007–08	Nottingham Panthers	EIHL	54	35	45	80	94	2	0	0	0	4
2008–09	Rodovre Mighty Bulls	Denmark	35	15	11	26	40	—	—	—	—	—
2009–10	Nottingham Panthers	EIHL	56	33	42	75	52	—	—	—	—	—
2010–11	Nottingham Panthers	EIHL	3	1	1	2	0	—	—	—	—	—
AHL totals			129	18	20	38	127	17	1	1	2	8
ECHL totals			191	59	66	125	378	7	5	3	8	31
EIHL totals			163	111	115	226	223	6	2	1	3	22
