= Doug Lynch (ice hockey) =

Canadian ice hockey player

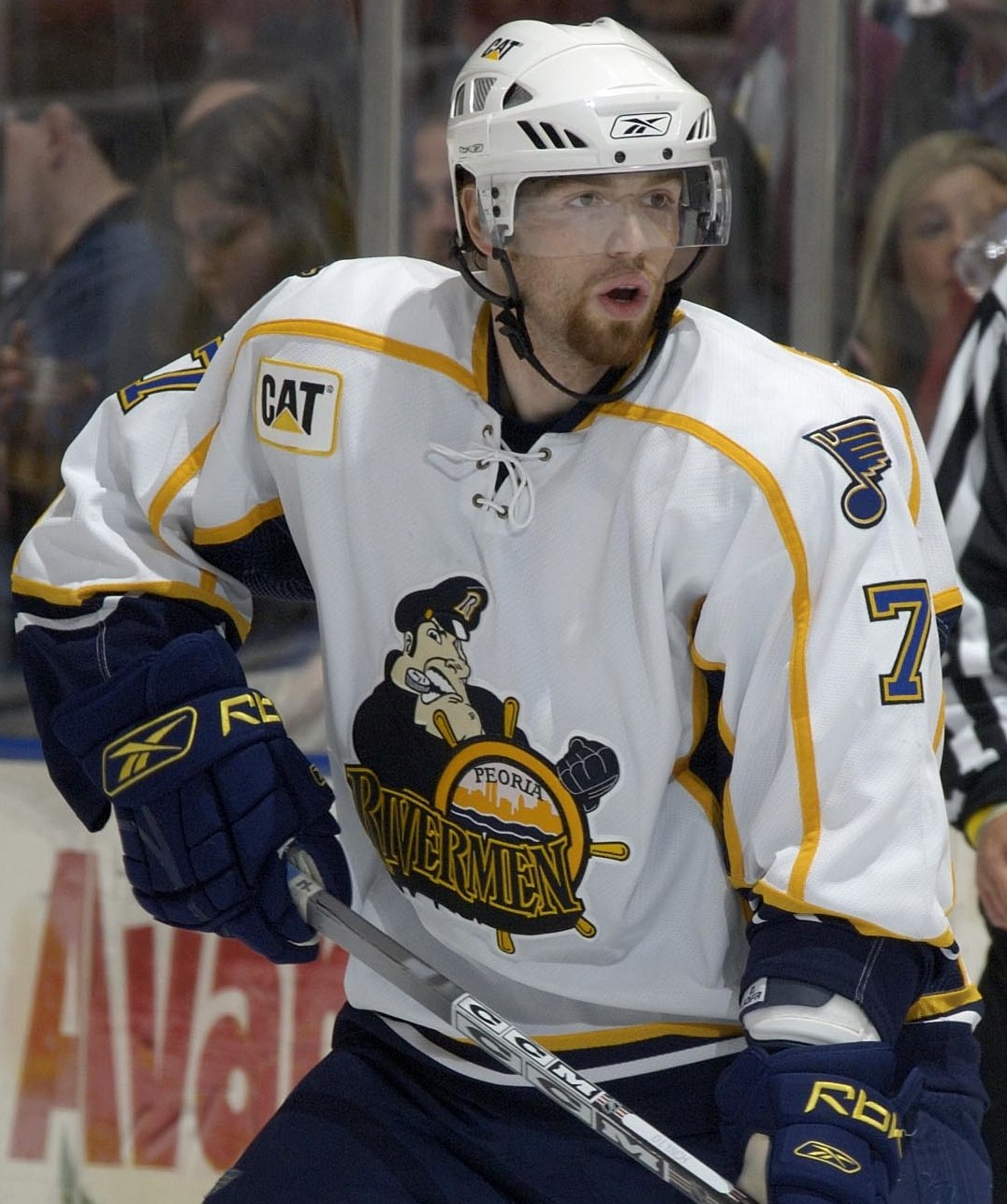
- Lynch with the Peoria Rivermen in 2006
- Born: April 4, 1983 (age 43) North Vancouver, British Columbia, Canada
- Height: 6 ft 3 in (191 cm)
- Weight: 214 lb (97 kg; 15 st 4 lb)
- Position: Defence
- Shot: Left
- Played for: Edmonton Oilers; EC Red Bull Salzburg; Vienna Capitals; Frölunda HC
- NHL draft: 43rd overall, 2001; Edmonton Oilers
- Playing career: 2003–2014

Douglas Lynch (born April 4, 1983) is a Canadian former professional ice hockey defenceman who played with the Edmonton Oilers in the National Hockey League (NHL).

== Playing career ==
Lynch was selected by the Edmonton Oilers in the second round, 43rd overall in the 2001 NHL entry draft. Lynch spent parts of five seasons in the Western Hockey League, the majority of them coming with the Red Deer Rebels, who (although taking him as a forward from Bantam) utilized him as a physical defenceman. After a breakout second full season, he was drafted by the Oilers, who had obtained the pick from the Boston Bruins as part of the Bill Guerin trade. Lynch finished his junior career with the Spokane Chiefs before graduating to professional hockey.

During his tenure with the Oilers organization, Lynch spent the majority of his time with the Toronto and Edmonton Roadrunners of the American Hockey League, although he did see a brief NHL stint during the 2003–2004 season. He was named to the 2003–04 AHL All-Rookie team and played in the All-Star game.

On August 3, 2005, he was traded to the St. Louis Blues with Eric Brewer and Jeff Woywitka in exchange for Chris Pronger. He never played a game for the Blues, instead having spells with the AHL's Peoria Rivermen and the ECHL's Alaska Aces. In 2007, Lynch signed with Austrian side Red Bull Salzburg.

On April 13, 2012, after three seasons with Salzburg, Lynch left to sign a one-year contract with the Frölunda Indians in Sweden. However, during the 2012-13 season, with a lack of offensive production Lynch left Frölunda mid-season and returned to Salzburg for the remainder of the campaign on January 6, 2013.

== Career statistics ==
			Regular season					Playoffs
Season	Team	League	GP	G	A	Pts	PIM	GP	G	A	Pts	PIM
1998–99	Red Deer Rebels	WHL	3	0	1	1	2	—	—	—	—	—
1999–2000	Red Deer Rebels	WHL	65	9	5	14	57	4	0	0	0	5
2000–01	Red Deer Rebels	WHL	72	12	37	49	181	21	1	9	10	30
2001–02	Red Deer Rebels	WHL	71	21	27	48	202	22	5	4	9	12
2002–03	Red Deer Rebels	WHL	13	7	5	12	27	—	—	—	—	—
2002–03	Spokane Chiefs	WHL	42	6	12	18	129	4	1	0	1	16
2003–04	Toronto Roadrunners	AHL	74	11	25	36	77	3	0	1	1	2
2003–04	Edmonton Oilers	NHL	2	0	0	0	0	—	—	—	—	—
2004–05	Edmonton Roadrunners	AHL	74	1	13	14	109	—	—	—	—	—
2005–06	Peoria Rivermen	AHL	29	0	2	2	57	—	—	—	—	—
2005–06	Alaska Aces	ECHL	8	1	1	2	2	22	0	4	4	10
2006–07	Peoria Rivermen	AHL	59	1	2	3	60	—	—	—	—	—
2007–08	EC Red Bull Salzburg	AUT	45	9	19	28	65	15	3	5	8	14
2008–09	Vienna Capitals	AUT	52	13	16	29	58	12	1	6	7	26
2009–10	EC Red Bull Salzburg	AUT	42	9	21	30	58	18	5	2	7	16
2010–11	EC Red Bull Salzburg	AUT	44	7	21	28	44	15	1	6	7	12
2011–12	EC Red Bull Salzburg	AUT	48	16	18	34	52	6	2	4	6	2
2012–13	Frölunda HC	SEL	33	2	2	4	18	—	—	—	—	—
2012–13	EC Red Bull Salzburg	AUT	14	1	2	3	16	11	1	1	2	37
2013–14	EC Red Bull Salzburg	AUT	30	5	12	17	26	—	—	—	—	—
AHL totals			236	13	42	55	303	3	0	1	1	2
NHL totals			2	0	0	0	0	—	—	—	—	—
AUT totals			275	60	108	168	319	76	13	24	37	107

== Awards and honours ==
Award	Year
AHL
All-Rookie Team	2004
