= Mike Morrison (ice hockey) =

American ice hockey player (born 1979)

- Born: July 11, 1979 (age 47) Medford, Massachusetts, U.S.
- Height: 6 ft 3 in (191 cm)
- Weight: 203 lb (92 kg; 14 st 7 lb)
- Position: Goaltender
- Caught: Left
- Played for: Edmonton Oilers; Ottawa Senators; Phoenix Coyotes; HDD Olimpija Ljubljana; Modo Hockey
- NHL draft: 186th overall, 1998; Edmonton Oilers
- Playing career: 2002–2010

Michael Morrison (born July 11, 1979) is an American former professional ice hockey goaltender who played in the National Hockey League (NHL) for the Edmonton Oilers, Ottawa Senators and the Phoenix Coyotes.

== Early life ==
Morrison was born in Medford, Massachusetts. As a youth, he played in the 1993 Quebec International Pee-Wee Hockey Tournament with a minor ice hockey team from the Montreal South Shore.

== Career ==
Morrison was selected in the 1998 NHL entry draft by the Edmonton Oilers, in the seventh round, 186th overall. He then played for the University of Maine for four years. He spent time playing for the ECHL's Columbus Cottonmouths, Greenville Grrrowl, and the AHL with the Edmonton Road Runners.

After the NHL lockout, Morrison was given a chance to play in the NHL when goaltenders Ty Conklin and Jussi Markkanen were unable to work for the Edmonton Oilers. He made his NHL debut on November 7, 2005, playing 18 minutes in relief during a shut-out defeat to the Dallas Stars. In his first start at Denver, he stopped 31 shots to put his team on top 5–2 against the home team, the Colorado Avalanche on November 14. He eventually became the Oilers' starting goaltender. On March 7, 2006, Oilers head coach Craig MacTavish made a decision to replace Conklin with Morrison before heading into a shootout against the Dallas Stars. The Oilers ended up losing by a shootout goal from Jussi Jokinen.

On March 8, 2006 the Oilers traded their first-round pick in the 2006 NHL entry draft to the Minnesota Wild for goaltender Dwayne Roloson. Since Edmonton had to unload a goaltender and could not find a trade partner, they placed Morrison on waivers, and he was picked up by the Ottawa Senators to back up Ray Emery.

On July 2, 2006, he was signed as a free agent by the Phoenix Coyotes to back up former Curtis Joseph and work with head coach Wayne Gretzky, and goaltender coach Grant Fuhr, all former Oilers. After posting a 0–3 record, a 6.14 goals against average and a .790 save percentage, Morrison was placed on waivers once again. He was not picked up and was sent to the minors. Morrison finished the year in the ECHL.

Morrison signed to play for HDD Olimpija Ljubljana in EBEL for the 2008-09 season, leaving from the Bridgeport Sound Tigers of the AHL.

On January 7, 2009, Morrison signed with Modo Hockey in the Swedish elite league Elitserien. Morrison then signed a one-year contract with the Albany River Rats in the American Hockey League on August 11, 2009.

== Career statistics ==
			Regular season									Playoffs
Season	Team	League	GP	W	L	T/OT	MIN	GA	SO	GAA	SV%	GP	W	L	MIN	GA	SO	GAA	SV%
1997–98	Phillips Exeter Academy	USHS	27	15	11	2	1632	64	1	2.35	.921	—	—	—	—	—	—	—	—
1998–99	University of Maine	HE	11	3	0	1	347	10	1	1.73	.917	—	—	—	—	—	—	—	—
1999–00	University of Maine	HE	12	7	2	1	608	27	1	2.66	.894	—	—	—	—	—	—	—	—
2000–01	University of Maine	HE	10	2	3	3	490	16	1	1.96	.924	—	—	—	—	—	—	—	—
2001–02	University of Maine	HE	30	20	3	4	1645	60	2	2.19	.921	—	—	—	—	—	—	—	—
2002–03	Columbus Cottonmouths	ECHL	38	9	18	6	1948	113	1	3.48	.892	—	—	—	—	—	—	—	—
2003–04	Toronto Roadrunners	AHL	27	12	8	2	1309	55	3	2.52	.913	—	—	—	—	—	—	—	—
2004–05	Greenville Grrrowl	ECHL	26	13	10	0	1576	72	1	2.74	.924	3	1	1	150	9	0	3.61	.893
2004–05	Edmonton Road Runners	AHL	14	2	5	5	728	21	2	1.73	.939	—	—	—	—	—	—	—	—
2005–06	Greenville Grrrowl	ECHL	9	7	2	0	548	20	0	2.19	.922	—	—	—	—	—	—	—	—
2005–06	Edmonton Oilers	NHL	21	10	4	2	891	42	0	2.83	.884	—	—	—	—	—	—	—	—
2005–06	Ottawa Senators	NHL	4	1	0	1	207	12	0	3.47	.875	—	—	—	—	—	—	—	—
2006–07	Phoenix Coyotes	NHL	4	0	3	0	127	13	0	6.13	.790	—	—	—	—	—	—	—	—
2006–07	San Antonio Rampage	AHL	2	0	1	0	60	11	0	11.01	.732	—	—	—	—	—	—	—	—
2006–07	Phoenix RoadRunners	ECHL	27	9	12	3	1423	80	1	3.37	.900	—	—	—	—	—	—	—	—
2007–08	Bridgeport Sound Tigers	AHL	43	23	17	1	2445	114	5	2.80	.911	—	—	—	—	—	—	—	—
2008–09	HDD Olimpija Ljubljana	EBEL	24	—	—	—	—	—	—	3.33	.901	—	—	—	—	—	—	—	—
2008–09	Modo Hockey	SEL	3	—	—	—	163	11	0	4.05	.847	—	—	—	—	—	—	—	—
2009–10	Florida Everblades	ECHL	22	9	10	3	1247	60	1	2.89	.899	—	—	—	—	—	—	—	—
2009–10	Albany River Rats	AHL	14	6	5	1	763	42	0	3.30	.892	—	—	—	—	—	—	—	—
2009–10	Utah Grizzlies	ECHL	1	0	1	0	60	9	0	9.00	.719	7	1	5	353	27	0	4.59	.865
NHL totals			29	11	7	3	1226	67	0	3.28	.871	—	—	—	—	—	—	—	—

== Awards and honors ==
Award	Year
All-Hockey East First Team	2001–02
