= Jeff Woywitka =

Canadian ice hockey player (born 1983)

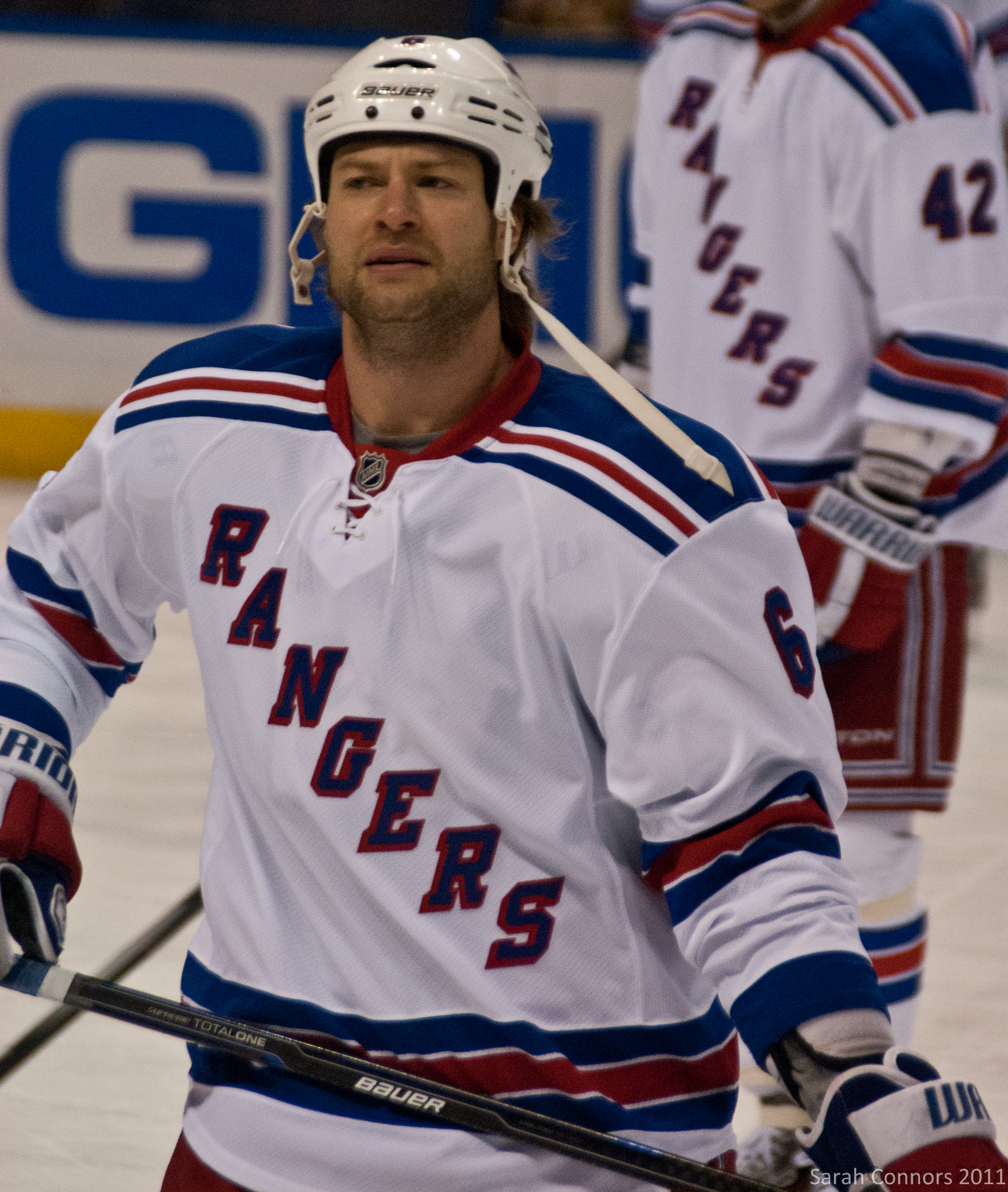
- Woywitka with the New York Rangers in December 2011
- Born: September 1, 1983 (age 42) Vermilion, Alberta, Canada
- Height: 6 ft 3 in (191 cm)
- Weight: 227 lb (103 kg; 16 st 3 lb)
- Position: Defence
- Shot: Left
- Played for: St. Louis Blues; Dallas Stars; New York Rangers
- NHL draft: 27th overall, 2001; Philadelphia Flyers
- Playing career: 2003–2015

Jeffrey Woywitka (born September 1, 1983) is a Canadian former professional ice hockey defenceman who played in the National Hockey League (NHL) for the St. Louis Blues, Dallas Stars, and New York Rangers.

== Playing career ==
Woywitka was drafted from the Red Deer Rebels in the first round, 27th overall by the Philadelphia Flyers in the 2001 NHL entry draft. After reporting to Philadelphia's AHL affiliate for his first professional season in 03–04, he was traded to the Edmonton Oilers midway through the season along with a first round pick (Rob Schremp) in 2004 and a third round pick (Danny Syvret) in 2005 in exchange for Mike Comrie.

In 2005, he was traded by the Edmonton Oilers along with Eric Brewer and Doug Lynch to the St. Louis Blues for 2000 league MVP, Chris Pronger. On July 7, 2009, Woywitka signed a two-year contract with the Dallas Stars, which ended when Woywitka entered the free agency on July 1, 2011.

On August 15, 2011, Woywitka signed a one-year contract with the Montreal Canadiens. At the commencement of the 2011–12 season, Woywitka failed to make the opening night roster for the Canadiens, and was placed on waivers with the intent to be reassigned to their AHL affiliate. The following day on October 6, 2011, Woywitka was claimed off waivers by the New York Rangers, where he was subsequently used primarily as a depth defenseman appearing in 27 games for 6 points.

On July 2, 2012, he returned to the St. Louis Blues as an unrestricted free agent on a one-year contract.

Woywitka played for Augsburger Panther of the German Deutsche Eishockey Liga for the 2013–14 and 2014–15 seasons before retiring.

== Career statistics ==
			Regular season					Playoffs
Season	Team	League	GP	G	A	Pts	PIM	GP	G	A	Pts	PIM
1999–2000	Red Deer Rebels	WHL	67	4	12	16	40	4	0	3	3	2
2000–01	Red Deer Rebels	WHL	72	7	28	35	113	22	2	8	10	25
2001–02	Red Deer Rebels	WHL	72	14	23	37	109	23	2	10	12	22
2002–03	Red Deer Rebels	WHL	57	16	36	52	65	23	1	9	10	25
2003–04	Philadelphia Phantoms	AHL	29	0	6	6	51	—	—	—	—	—
2003–04	Toronto Roadrunners	AHL	53	4	18	22	41	3	0	0	0	2
2004–05	Edmonton Roadrunners	AHL	80	6	20	26	84	—	—	—	—	—
2005–06	St. Louis Blues	NHL	26	0	2	2	25	—	—	—	—	—
2005–06	Peoria Rivermen	AHL	53	1	14	15	58	4	0	0	0	4
2006–07	Peoria Rivermen	AHL	41	0	18	18	20	—	—	—	—	—
2006–07	St. Louis Blues	NHL	34	1	6	7	12	—	—	—	—	—
2007–08	Peoria Rivermen	AHL	52	10	20	30	35	—	—	—	—	—
2007–08	St. Louis Blues	NHL	27	2	6	8	12	—	—	—	—	—
2008–09	St. Louis Blues	NHL	65	3	15	18	57	4	0	0	0	0
2008–09	Peoria Rivermen	AHL	7	0	7	7	2	—	—	—	—	—
2009–10	Dallas Stars	NHL	36	0	3	3	11	—	—	—	—	—
2010–11	Dallas Stars	NHL	63	2	9	11	24	—	—	—	—	—
2011–12	New York Rangers	NHL	27	1	5	6	8	—	—	—	—	—
2011–12	Connecticut Whale	AHL	6	0	3	3	6	—	—	—	—	—
2012–13	Peoria Rivermen	AHL	34	1	10	11	22	—	—	—	—	—
2013–14	Augsburger Panther	DEL	35	3	6	9	83	—	—	—	—	—
2014–15	Augsburger Panther	DEL	52	2	18	20	68	—	—	—	—	—
AHL totals			355	22	116	138	319	7	0	0	0	6
NHL totals			278	9	46	55	149	4	0	0	0	0

=== International ===
Year	Team	Event	GP	G	A	Pts	PIM
2000	Canada Pacific	U17	5	2	1	3	4
2003	Canada	WJC	6	1	1	2	0
Junior totals			11	3	2	5	4

== Awards and honours ==
Award	Year
WHL
East Second All-Star Team	2002
East First All-Star Team	2003
Bill Hunter Memorial Trophy	2003
CHL Third All-Star team	2003

Awards and achievements
Preceded by Justin Williams	Philadelphia Flyers' first-round draft pick 2001	Succeeded by Joni Pitkanen
