= Rocky Thompson =

Canadian ice hockey player and coach

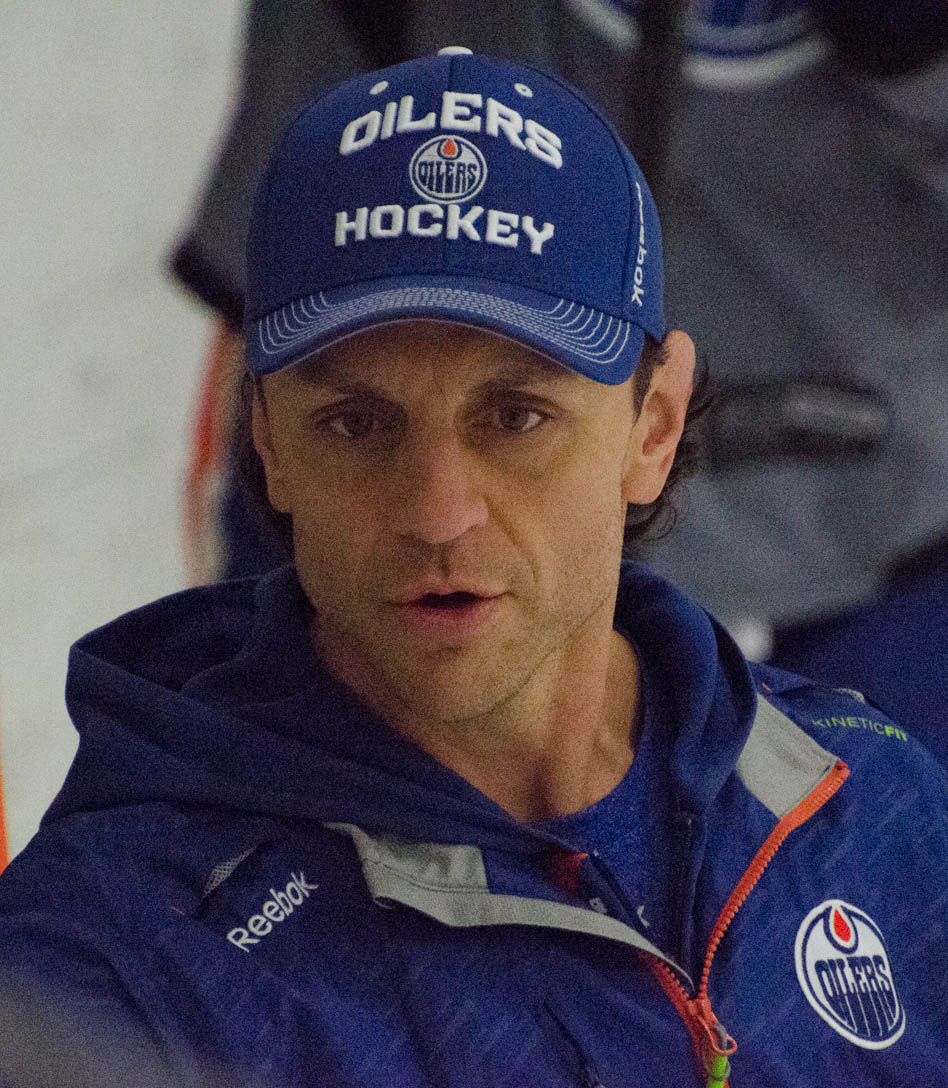
- Thompson at the 2014 Edmonton Oilers training camp
- Born: August 8, 1977 (age 48) Calgary, Alberta, Canada
- Height: 6 ft 2 in (188 cm)
- Weight: 200 lb (91 kg; 14 st 4 lb)
- Position: Right wing, Defence
- Shot: Right
- Played for: Calgary Flames; Florida Panthers
- NHL draft: 72nd overall, 1995; Calgary Flames
- Playing career: 1996–2007

Rocky Lee Thompson (born August 8, 1977) is a Canadian former ice hockey right wing. Most recently, he was the head coach of the Bridgeport Islanders of the American Hockey League, and was previously an assistant coach with the Philadelphia Flyers of the NHL. He was drafted in the third round, 72nd overall, by the Calgary Flames in the 1995 NHL entry draft. This Cree forward/defenseman was born in Calgary, Alberta and raised in Whitecourt, Alberta. During his hockey career, he was known as an enforcer. Along with hockey, he showed promise in boxing as a teenager, winning gold in the 1993 North American Indigenous Games as well as in provincial Golden Gloves tournament championships in Alberta and Saskatchewan.

== Playing career ==
After playing four seasons in the Western Hockey League, Thompson made his professional debut with the Flames' American Hockey League affiliate, the Saint John Flames. He appeared in 15 NHL games with the Flames during the 1997–98 and 1998–99 seasons. He made a brief return to the NHL with the Florida Panthers, appearing in ten games during the 2000–01 and 2001–02 seasons. In only 25 NHL games, Thompson racked up 117 penalty minutes.

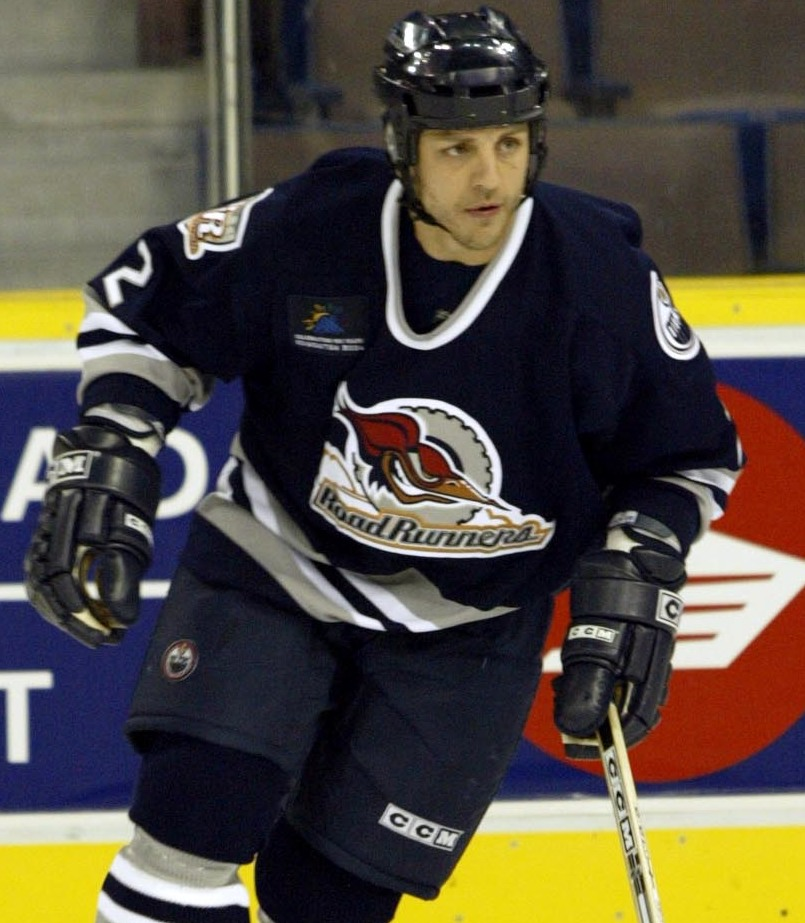
Thompson with the Edmonton Road Runners in 2004

Most of his professional career has been spent with various AHL teams, tallying numerous penalty minutes. Most recently, he played in 55 games for the Peoria Rivermen during the 2006–07 season, recording 127 penalty minutes.

== Coaching career ==
Following his professional career, Rocky Thompson turned to coaching, becoming the assistant coach for the expansion Edmonton Oil Kings of the Western Hockey League in 2007. He would later become an assistant coach for the Oklahoma City Barons.

On July 16, 2014, Thompson was promoted to assistant coach of the Edmonton Oilers.

On July 3, 2015, Thompson was hired as head coach of the Windsor Spitfires. In his first season, he took a Spitfires team that finished last in the conference and guided them to 87 regular-season points and second place in the OHL West Division, before losing in five games to the London Knights in the first round of the playoffs. Thompson coached the Spitfires as they became champions of the 2017 Memorial Cup.

On June 7, 2017, Thompson was hired as head coach of the Chicago Wolves of the American Hockey League. He spent three seasons in the position before joining the San Jose Sharks as an associate coach on September 22, 2020. He did not return for the 2021–22 season, as he would not be vaccinated against COVID-19 as required by the NHL for people in close contact with the players.

In the summer of 2022, it was announced that Thompson was hired by the Philadelphia Flyers as an assistant coach for the 2022–23 season. He remained in this position through the 2024–25 season.

On June 23, 2025, he was hired as head coach of the Bridgeport Islanders, the AHL affiliate of the New York Islanders (NHL).

== Career statistics ==
| | | | Regular season | | | | | Playoffs |
| Season | Team | League | GP | G | A | Pts | PIM | GP | G | A | Pts | PIM |
|---|---|---|---|---|---|---|---|---|---|---|---|---|
| 1993–94 | Medicine Hat Tigers | WHL | 68 | 1 | 4 | 5 | 166 | 3 | 0 | 0 | 0 | 2 |
| 1994–95 | Medicine Hat Tigers | WHL | 63 | 1 | 6 | 7 | 220 | 5 | 0 | 0 | 0 | 17 |
| 1995–96 | Medicine Hat Tigers | WHL | 71 | 9 | 20 | 29 | 260 | 5 | 2 | 3 | 5 | 26 |
| 1995–96 | Saint John Flames | AHL | 4 | 0 | 0 | 0 | 33 | — | — | — | — | — |
| 1996–97 | Medicine Hat Tigers | WHL | 47 | 6 | 9 | 15 | 170 | — | — | — | — | — |
| 1996–97 | Swift Current Broncos | WHL | 22 | 3 | 5 | 8 | 90 | 10 | 1 | 2 | 3 | 22 |
| 1997–98 | Saint John Flames | AHL | 51 | 3 | 0 | 3 | 187 | 18 | 1 | 1 | 2 | 47 |
| 1997–98 | Calgary Flames | NHL | 12 | 0 | 0 | 0 | 61 | — | — | — | — | — |
| 1998–99 | Calgary Flames | NHL | 3 | 0 | 0 | 0 | 25 | — | — | — | — | — |
| 1998–99 | Saint John Flames | AHL | 27 | 2 | 2 | 4 | 108 | — | — | — | — | — |
| 1999–00 | Saint John Flames | AHL | 53 | 2 | 8 | 10 | 125 | — | — | — | — | — |
| 1999–00 | Louisville Panthers | AHL | 3 | 0 | 1 | 1 | 54 | 4 | 0 | 0 | 0 | 4 |
| 2000–01 | Louisville Panthers | AHL | 55 | 3 | 5 | 8 | 193 | — | — | — | — | — |
| 2000–01 | Florida Panthers | NHL | 4 | 0 | 0 | 0 | 19 | — | — | — | — | — |
| 2001–02 | Hershey Bears | AHL | 42 | 0 | 3 | 3 | 143 | 8 | 1 | 0 | 1 | 19 |
| 2001–02 | Florida Panthers | NHL | 6 | 0 | 0 | 0 | 12 | — | — | — | — | — |
| 2002–03 | San Antonio Rampage | AHL | 79 | 1 | 11 | 12 | 275 | 3 | 0 | 0 | 0 | 4 |
| 2003–04 | Toronto Roadrunners | AHL | 69 | 1 | 8 | 9 | 196 | 3 | 1 | 1 | 2 | 0 |
| 2004–05 | Edmonton Road Runners | AHL | 69 | 3 | 3 | 6 | 231 | — | — | — | — | — |
| 2005–06 | Peoria Rivermen | AHL | 59 | 1 | 4 | 5 | 247 | 3 | 0 | 0 | 0 | 19 |
| 2006–07 | Peoria Rivermen | AHL | 55 | 1 | 7 | 8 | 127 | — | — | — | — | — |
| AHL totals | | | 566 | 17 | 52 | 60 | 1919 | 39 | 3 | 2 | 5 | 93 |
| NHL totals | | | 25 | 0 | 0 | 0 | 117 | — | — | — | — | — |
