= Mathieu Roy (ice hockey, born 1983) =

Canadian ice hockey player

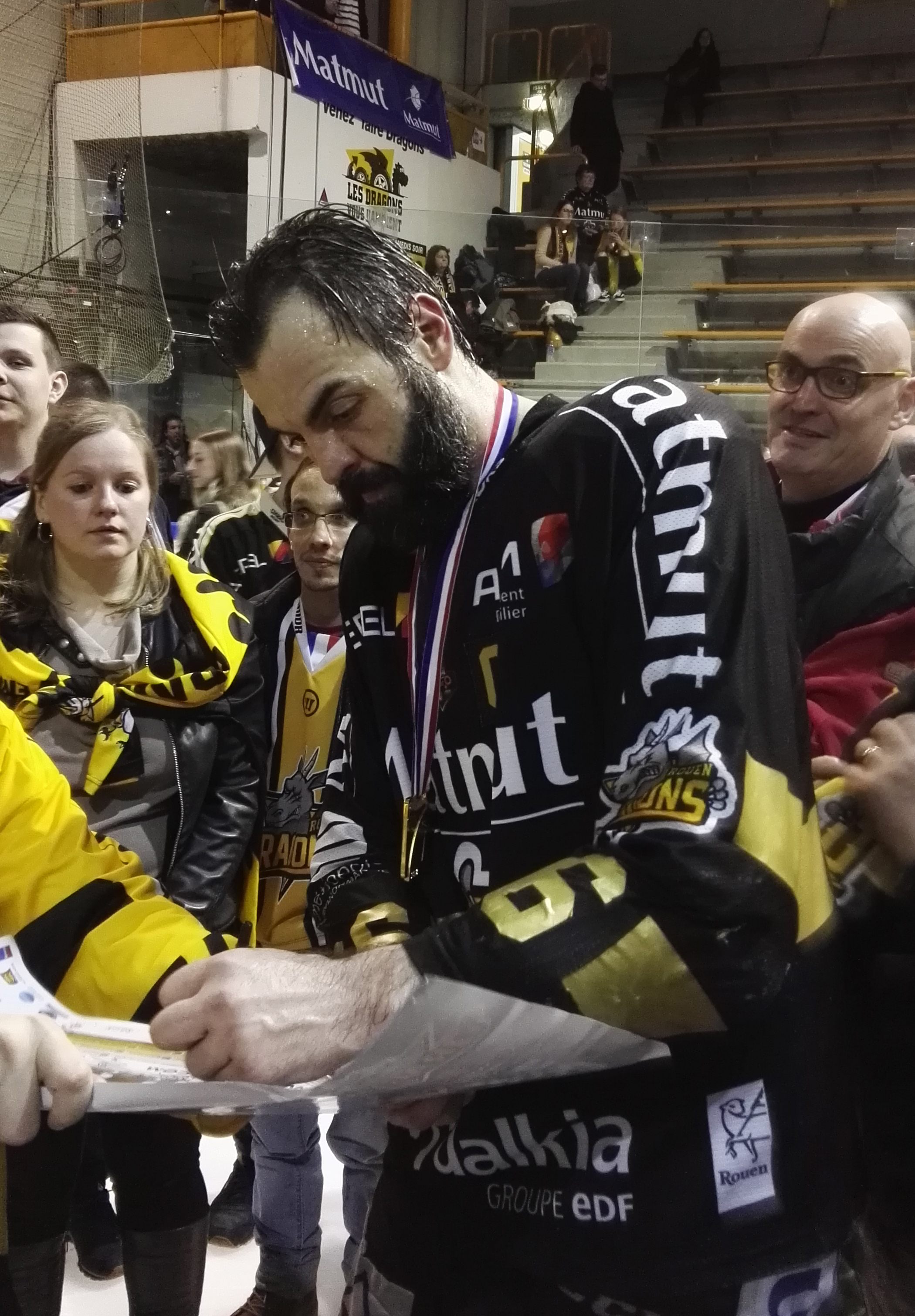
- Born: August 10, 1983 (age 42) Saint-Georges, Quebec, Canada
- Height: 6 ft 2 in (188 cm)
- Weight: 214 lb (97 kg; 15 st 4 lb)
- Position: Defence
- Shot: Left
- team Former teams: Retired; Edmonton Oilers; Columbus Blue Jackets; Tampa Bay Lightning; Hamburg Freezers; EC Red Bull Salzburg; Dragons de Rouen
- NHL draft: 215th overall, 2003; Edmonton Oilers
- Playing career: 2003–2023

Mathieu Roy (born August 10, 1983) is a Canadian former professional ice hockey defenceman.

== Playing career ==
Roy was drafted in the seventh round of the 2003 NHL entry draft, 215th overall, by the Edmonton Oilers. Most of Roy's professional career has been spent in the American Hockey League, with the Toronto and Edmonton Roadrunners, and the Hamilton Bulldogs, although he has also spent time in the NHL with the Edmonton Oilers.

In the 2006–07 season, on January 10, 2007, while on a recall to the Oilers, Roy scored his first NHL goal against the San Jose Sharks.

On November 2, 2007, after only a few minutes into a game, Roy was checked into the boards by Nashville Predators forward Jordin Tootoo, forcing Roy to leave the game with a shoulder injury.

On July 14, 2009, Roy signed a one-year, two-way contract with the Columbus Blue Jackets. In the 2009–10 season, Roy appeared in 31 games with the Blue Jackets, recording a career-high 10 assists before he was traded to the Florida Panthers for Matt Rust on March 3, 2010.

The following season, Roy was signed by the Tampa Bay Lightning and was assigned to AHL affiliate, the Norfolk Admirals to begin the 2010–11 season. Roy registered 22 points in 45 games with the Admirals and was recalled to play in 4 games with the Lighting during the season as a depth defense man.

A free agent, Roy signed with South East Division rivals the Carolina Hurricanes to a one-year contract on September 14, 2011. Roy failed to make his debut with the Hurricanes, assigned to affiliate the Charlotte Checkers for the duration of the 2011–12 season.

With free agency once again in procession and the impending 2012 NHL lockout, Roy signed his first European contract with the Hamburg Freezers of the Deutsche Eishockey Liga on July 12, 2012. During a successful debut season with the Freezers, Roy was signed to a contract extension on January 3, 2013, that would keep him with the Hamburg team until the end of the 2014-15 campaign. He finished the 2012–13 season, with 26 points in 51 games.

Upon elimination from the Playoffs with the Freezers, Roy returned to North America for the off-season. On April 23, 2013, with his previous NHL club, the Tampa Bay Lightning, suffering from a depleted blueline, Roy was signed to a contract for the final game of the Lightning's 2013 season, before returning to Hamburg for the 2013–14 season. In March 2015, he inked a new two-year deal with the Hamburg Freezers. In May 2016, his Hamburg stint ended prematurely as the organization folded. Roy had spent a total of four years with the Freezers.

He signed with EC Red Bull Salzburg of the Austrian Hockey League (EBEL) on July 18, 2016.

== Career statistics ==
			Regular season					Playoffs
Season	Team	League	GP	G	A	Pts	PIM	GP	G	A	Pts	PIM
1998–99	Lévis Commandeurs	QMAAA	11	4	1	5	16	—	—	—	—	—
1999–2000	Lévis Commandeurs	QMAAA	24	3	4	7	88	6	1	1	2	22
1999–2000	Val–d'Or Foreurs	QMJHL	48	1	4	5	66	—	—	—	—	—
2000–01	Val–d'Or Foreurs	QMJHL	30	0	7	7	60	17	0	0	0	4
2001–02	Val–d'Or Foreurs	QMJHL	53	7	26	33	103	7	0	2	2	19
2002–03	Val–d'Or Foreurs	QMJHL	52	11	21	32	164	7	1	0	1	8
2003–04	Toronto Roadrunners	AHL	30	0	2	2	46	—	—	—	—	—
2003–04	Columbus Cottonmouths	ECHL	10	1	2	3	13	—	—	—	—	—
2004–05	Edmonton Road Runners	AHL	51	3	22	25	68	—	—	—	—	—
2005–06	Hamilton Bulldogs	AHL	50	3	16	19	82	—	—	—	—	—
2005–06	Edmonton Oilers	NHL	1	0	0	0	0	—	—	—	—	—
2006–07	Hamilton Bulldogs	AHL	31	6	12	18	40	—	—	—	—	—
2006–07	Edmonton Oilers	NHL	16	2	0	2	30	—	—	—	—	—
2007–08	Edmonton Oilers	NHL	13	0	1	1	27	—	—	—	—	—
2007–08	Springfield Falcons	AHL	20	2	8	10	34	—	—	—	—	—
2008–09	Springfield Falcons	AHL	59	2	15	17	120	—	—	—	—	—
2009–10	Columbus Blue Jackets	NHL	31	0	10	10	17	—	—	—	—	—
2009–10	Syracuse Crunch	AHL	14	0	4	4	32	—	—	—	—	—
2009–10	Rochester Americans	AHL	1	0	0	0	0	6	0	0	0	11
2010–11	Norfolk Admirals	AHL	45	4	18	22	68	6	0	1	1	4
2010–11	Tampa Bay Lightning	NHL	4	0	0	0	2	—	—	—	—	—
2011–12	Charlotte Checkers	AHL	62	6	12	18	57	—	—	—	—	—
2012–13	Hamburg Freezers	DEL	51	8	18	26	46	6	0	5	5	8
2012–13	Tampa Bay Lightning	NHL	1	0	0	0	0	—	—	—	—	—
2013–14	Hamburg Freezers	DEL	28	4	10	14	28	12	1	3	4	28
2014–15	Hamburg Freezers	DEL	48	5	23	28	77	7	1	2	3	29
2015–16	Hamburg Freezers	DEL	52	3	23	26	94	—	—	—	—	—
2016–17	EC Red Bull Salzburg	AUT	1	0	0	0	0	—	—	—	—	—
2017–18	Dragons de Rouen	FRA	30	4	15	19	42	15	1	4	5	14
2018–19	Dragons de Rouen	FRA	44	8	17	25	69	16	5	7	12	20
2019–20	Dragons de Rouen	FRA	39	5	17	22	46	4	0	1	1	4
2021–22	Saint–Georges Cool FM 103.5	LNAH	7	0	6	6	6	11	4	5	9	6
2022–23	Saint–Georges Cool FM 103.5	LNAH	25	5	13	18	41	2	0	0	0	2
NHL totals			66	2	11	13	76	—	—	—	—	—
AHL totals			363	26	109	135	547	12	0	1	1	15
LNAH totals			32	5	19	24	47	13	4	5	9	8
DEL totals			179	20	74	94	245	25	2	10	12	65
FRA totals			113	17	49	66	157	35	6	12	18	38
