= Tyler Moss =

Canadian ice hockey player (born 1975)

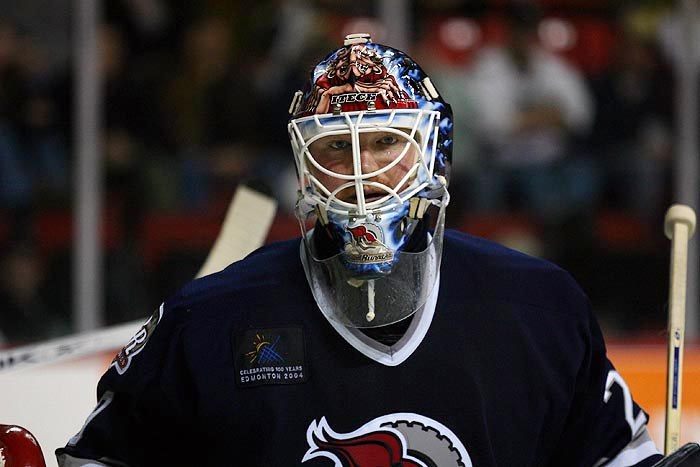
- Moss with the Edmonton Road Runners in 2004
- Born: June 29, 1975 (age 50) Ottawa, Ontario, Canada
- Height: 6 ft 0 in (183 cm)
- Weight: 206 lb (93 kg; 14 st 10 lb)
- Position: Goaltender
- Caught: Right
- Played for: Thomas Sabo Ice Tigers; Amur Khabarovsk; HC Spartak Moscow; Vancouver Canucks; Carolina Hurricanes; Calgary Flames
- NHL draft: 29th overall, 1993; Tampa Bay Lightning
- Playing career: 1995–2012

Tyler Moss (born June 29, 1975) is a Canadian former professional ice hockey goaltender. Moss played for the Carolina Hurricanes, Calgary Flames and Vancouver Canucks of the National Hockey League (NHL).

== Playing career ==
Moss played junior for the local Nepean Raiders and the Kingston Frontenacs from 1991 until 1995. He was drafted in the second round, 29th overall, by the Tampa Bay Lightning in the 1993 NHL entry draft. He turned professional in 1995 with the Atlanta Knights and was eventually traded to the Calgary Flames in 1997. He would play 17 games for the Flames before he was traded to the Pittsburgh Penguins in 2000. He played for the Carolina Hurricanes in 2000-01 before being demoted to the minors. He remained in the North American minor leagues until 2005, when he left to play for HC Spartak Moscow.

== Career statistics ==
=== Regular season and playoffs ===
			Regular season									Playoffs
Season	Team	League	GP	W	L	T	MIN	GA	SO	GAA	SV%	GP	W	L	MIN	GA	SO	GAA	SV%
1991–92	Nepean Raiders	CJHL	26	7	12	1	1335	109	0	4.90	—	—	—	—	—	—	—	—	—
1992–93	Kingston Frontenacs	OHL	31	13	7	5	1537	97	0	3.79	—	6	1	2	228	19	0	5.00	—
1993–94	Kingston Frontenacs	OHL	13	6	4	3	795	42	1	3.17	—	3	0	2	136	8	0	3.53	—
1994–95	Kingston Frontenacs	OHL	57	33	17	5	3249	164	1	3.03	—	6	2	4	333	27	0	4.86	—
1995–96	Atlanta Knights	IHL	40	11	19	4	2030	138	1	4.08	.880	3	0	3	213	11	0	3.10	.897
1996–97	Adirondack Red Wings	AHL	11	1	5	2	507	42	1	4.97	.860	—	—	—	—	—	—	—	—
1996–97	Grand Rapids Griffins	IHL	15	5	6	1	715	35	0	2.94	.904	—	—	—	—	—	—	—	—
1996–97	Muskegon Fury	CoHL	2	1	1	0	119	5	0	2.51	.906	—	—	—	—	—	—	—	—
1996–97	Saint John Flames	AHL	9	6	1	1	534	17	0	1.91	.940	5	2	3	242	15	0	3.72	.872
1997–98	Calgary Flames	NHL	6	2	3	1	367	20	0	3.27	.892	—	—	—	—	—	—	—	—
1997–98	Saint John Flames	AHL	39	19	10	7	2194	91	0	2.49	.923	15	8	5	761	37	0	2.91	.906
1998–99	Calgary Flames	NHL	11	3	7	0	550	23	0	2.51	.922	—	—	—	—	—	—	—	—
1998–99	Saint John Flames	AHL	9	2	5	1	475	25	0	3.16	.897	—	—	—	—	—	—	—	—
1998–99	Orlando Solar Bears	IHL	9	6	2	1	515	21	1	2.45	.909	17	10	7	1017	53	0	3.13	.896
1999–00	Kansas City Blades	IHL	36	18	12	5	2116	105	3	2.98	.899	—	—	—	—	—	—	—	—
1999–00	Wilkes-Barre/Scranton Penguins	AHL	4	1	1	1	188	11	0	3.52	.895	—	—	—	—	—	—	—	—
2000–01	Carolina Hurricanes	NHL	12	1	6	0	557	37	0	3.99	.853	—	—	—	—	—	—	—	—
2000–01	Cincinnati Cyclones	IHL	9	5	3	1	506	24	2	2.85	.906	—	—	—	—	—	—	—	—
2001–02	Lowell Lock Monsters	AHL	43	20	16	7	2572	106	1	2.47	.929	—	—	—	—	—	—	—	—
2002–03	Vancouver Canucks	NHL	1	0	0	0	22	1	0	2.67	.929	—	—	—	—	—	—	—	—
2002–03	Manitoba Moose	AHL	42	21	15	5	2502	117	3	2.81	.909	10	6	4	618	23	0	2.23	.922
2003–04	Manitoba Moose	AHL	32	10	16	5	1883	91	3	2.90	.897	—	—	—	—	—	—	—	—
2003–04	Toronto Roadrunners	AHL	16	7	9	0	932	41	3	2.64	.922	3	1	2	211	8	0	2.28	.935
2004–05	Edmonton Roadrunners	AHL	50	24	19	4	2870	126	5	2.63	.906	—	—	—	—	—	—	—	—
2005–06	HC Spartak Moscow	RUS	18	—	—	—	996	33	2	1.99	.923	2	—	—	84	6	0	4.28	—
2006–07	Amur Khabarovsk	RUS	28	—	—	—	—	—	—	2.34	.909	—	—	—	—	—	—	—	—
2007–08	Amur Khabarovsk	RUS	37	—	—	—	—	—	—	2.96	.901	3	—	—	—	—	—	3.12	.921
2008–09	Amur Khabarovsk	KHL	34	10	16	3	1628	75	5	2.76	.903	—	—	—	—	—	—	—	—
2009–10	Amur Khabarovsk	KHL	30	7	11	6	1502	73	0	2.92	.906	—	—	—	—	—	—	—	—
2010–11	Hannover Scorpions	DEL	16	8	7	0	923	34	2	2.21	.929	5	—	—	—	—	—	4.00	.872
2011–12	Thomas Sabo Ice Tigers	DEL	8	2	4	0	445	22	0	2.96	.899	—	—	—	—	—	—	—	—
NHL totals			30	6	16	1	1497	81	0	3.25	.891	—	—	—	—	—	—	—	—

== Awards and records ==
- 1995 - OHL First All-Star Team
- 1993 - OHL All-Rookie Team
- 1998 - Harry "Hap" Holmes Memorial Award (fewest goals against - AHL) (shared with Jean-Sebastien Giguere)
