= Kyle Brodziak =

Canadian ice hockey player (born 1984)

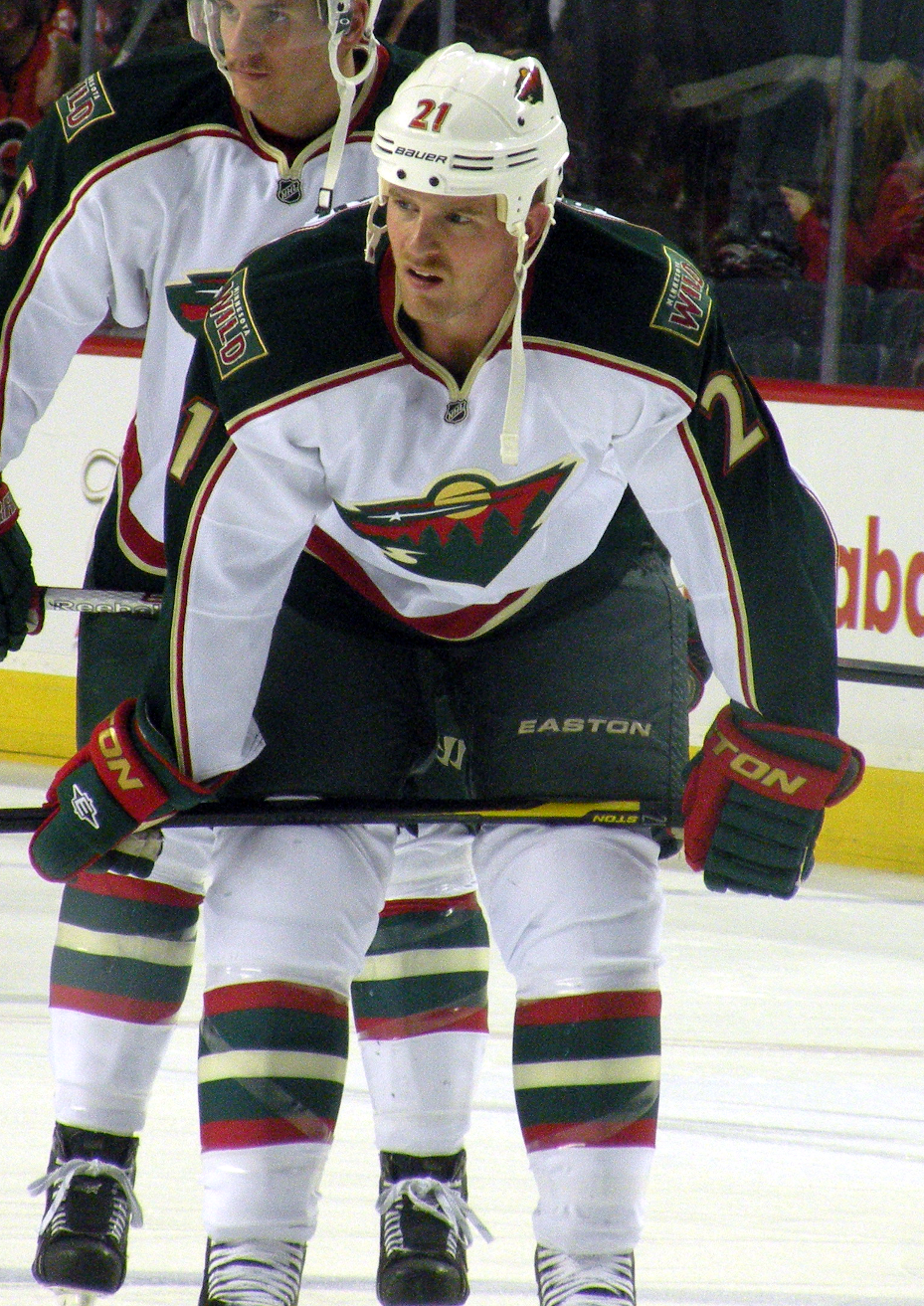
- Brodziak with the Minnesota Wild in 2011
- Born: May 25, 1984 (age 42) St. Paul, Alberta, Canada
- Height: 6 ft 2 in (188 cm)
- Weight: 209 lb (95 kg; 14 st 13 lb)
- Position: Centre
- Shot: Right
- Played for: Edmonton Oilers; Minnesota Wild; St. Louis Blues
- NHL draft: 214th overall, 2003; Edmonton Oilers
- Playing career: 2004–2019

Kyle Brodziak (born May 25, 1984) is a Canadian former professional ice hockey centre. He previously played for the Edmonton Oilers, Minnesota Wild and St. Louis Blues. He was selected in the seventh round of the 2003 NHL entry draft, 214th overall, by the Oilers after being passed over in the 2002 draft.

== Playing career ==
=== Junior career ===
Brodziak was drafted 14th overall in the 1999 WHL Bantam Draft by the Moose Jaw Warriors of the Western Hockey League (WHL), where he spent his entire junior career. He debuted as a 15-year-old in the final two games of the 1999–2000 season, and won a full-time spot with the team the following season. For the next two seasons, Brodziak played a minor role, scoring 10 times in 129 games. On the advice of his agent, he opted into the 2002 NHL entry draft, but went unselected.

However, in the 2002–03 season, Brodziak exploded offensively, scoring 32 times and more than tripling his previous year's points total. He was also named Moose Jaw's hardest working player and unsung hero, and attended the selection camp for Canada's 2003 World Junior team, where he was the final forward cut. Subsequently, Brodziak was drafted 214th overall by the Edmonton Oilers at the 2003 NHL entry draft and attended their first ever Top Prospects Camp. Brodziak also attended the Oilers' main training camp at the beginning of the 2003–04 season, but was returned to Moose Jaw, where he got off to a good start, being named Canadian Hockey League (CHL) Player of the Week for October 27–November 2. His high level of play continued, as he represented the WHL against the Russian Selects and finished the year third in the WHL in scoring. He was also named to the CHL Second All-Star Team and the WHL East First All-Star Team.

On June 14, 2004, Brodziak signed a three-year, entry-level contract with the Oilers.

=== Professional career ===
Brodziak made his professional debut with the Edmonton Oilers' American Hockey League (AHL) affiliate, the Edmonton Road Runners, in the 2004–05 season. Despite a slow start, Brodziak finished the year strongly and became a consistent performer for his team. After the Road Runners ceased operation, the Oilers arranged for a number of players, including Brodziak, to play for the Dallas Stars' AHL affiliate, the Iowa Stars. Consequently, Brodziak was forced to play out of position and received less ice time than he would have with a team run by the Oilers, and his offensive game suffered. However, his defensive play improved, and he was recalled to Edmonton almost immediately due to an injury to Michael Peca. Brodziak played five games during his initial stint with the Oilers before being reassigned to the minor leagues October 24, 2005. He was recalled to the Oilers twice more in 2005–06 and played ten games.

The 2006–07 season saw Brodziak assigned to another AHL team, the Pittsburgh Penguins' affiliate, the Wilkes-Barre/Scranton Penguins. His offensive game improved, and he again saw time with the Oilers, playing six games as an injury call-up and scoring his first NHL goal against Curtis Sanford on March 17, 2007. Brodziak made the Oilers out of training camp at the beginning of the 2007–08 season after an excellent pre-season, where he impressed Oilers head coach Craig MacTavish. After scoring twice and setting up the winner against the Florida Panthers in pre-season play, MacTavish said, "It looks like he's made the decision he's staying, that was a hell of a game."

On June 27, 2009, Brodziak was traded to the Minnesota Wild, along with an exchange of draft picks at the 2009 NHL entry draft. On July 23, 2009, Brodziak signed a three-year contract with the Wild as a restricted free agent. On February 19, 2012, Brodziak signed a three-year contract extension with Minnesota.

On July 2, 2015, having left the Wild organization as a free agent, Brodziak signed a one-year contract with the St. Louis Blues. In the 2017–18 season, his third with the Blues, Brodziak rediscovered his scoring touch, playing in a utility role by scoring 10 goals and 23 assists for 33 points in 81 games, his most since 2012.

On July 1, 2018, having completed his contract with the Blues, Brodziak signed as a free agent to a two-year, $2.3 million contract in a return to the Edmonton Oilers. In his second stint with the Oilers, Brodziak assumed fourth-line center duties for the 2018–19 season, contributing with 6 goals and 9 points through 70 regular season games.

Approaching the 2019–20 season, Brodziak's 15-year playing career was effectively ended after succumbing to chronic back injuries. With one year remaining on his contract with the Oilers, Brodziak was placed on the long-term injury reserve. On February 24, 2020, Brodziak's contract was traded to the Detroit Red Wings, along with a conditional 2020 fourth-round draft pick, in exchange for Mike Green.

== Career statistics ==
| | | | Regular season | | | | | Playoffs |
| Season | Team | League | GP | G | A | Pts | PIM | GP | G | A | Pts | PIM |
|---|---|---|---|---|---|---|---|---|---|---|---|---|
| 1999–00 | Moose Jaw Warriors | WHL | 2 | 0 | 0 | 0 | 0 | — | — | — | — | — |
| 2000–01 | Moose Jaw Warriors | WHL | 57 | 2 | 8 | 10 | 49 | 3 | 0 | 0 | 0 | 0 |
| 2001–02 | Moose Jaw Warriors | WHL | 72 | 8 | 12 | 20 | 56 | 12 | 0 | 3 | 3 | 11 |
| 2002–03 | Moose Jaw Warriors | WHL | 72 | 32 | 30 | 62 | 84 | 13 | 5 | 3 | 8 | 16 |
| 2003–04 | Moose Jaw Warriors | WHL | 70 | 39 | 54 | 93 | 58 | 10 | 5 | 4 | 9 | 10 |
| 2004–05 | Edmonton Road Runners | AHL | 56 | 6 | 26 | 32 | 49 | — | — | — | — | — |
| 2005–06 | Iowa Stars | AHL | 28 | 6 | 9 | 15 | 24 | — | — | — | — | — |
| 2005–06 | Edmonton Oilers | NHL | 10 | 0 | 0 | 0 | 4 | — | — | — | — | — |
| 2006–07 | Wilkes–Barre/Scranton Penguins | AHL | 62 | 24 | 32 | 56 | 44 | 11 | 1 | 5 | 6 | 14 |
| 2006–07 | Edmonton Oilers | NHL | 6 | 1 | 0 | 1 | 2 | — | — | — | — | — |
| 2007–08 | Edmonton Oilers | NHL | 80 | 14 | 17 | 31 | 33 | — | — | — | — | — |
| 2008–09 | Edmonton Oilers | NHL | 79 | 11 | 16 | 27 | 21 | — | — | — | — | — |
| 2009–10 | Minnesota Wild | NHL | 82 | 9 | 23 | 32 | 22 | — | — | — | — | — |
| 2010–11 | Minnesota Wild | NHL | 80 | 16 | 21 | 37 | 56 | — | — | — | — | — |
| 2011–12 | Minnesota Wild | NHL | 82 | 22 | 22 | 44 | 66 | — | — | — | — | — |
| 2012–13 | Minnesota Wild | NHL | 48 | 8 | 4 | 12 | 20 | 5 | 0 | 2 | 2 | 4 |
| 2013–14 | Minnesota Wild | NHL | 81 | 8 | 16 | 24 | 61 | 12 | 3 | 3 | 6 | 2 |
| 2014–15 | Minnesota Wild | NHL | 73 | 9 | 11 | 20 | 47 | 10 | 0 | 0 | 0 | 2 |
| 2015–16 | St. Louis Blues | NHL | 76 | 7 | 4 | 11 | 37 | 20 | 2 | 0 | 2 | 6 |
| 2016–17 | St. Louis Blues | NHL | 69 | 8 | 7 | 15 | 27 | 10 | 0 | 2 | 2 | 2 |
| 2017–18 | St. Louis Blues | NHL | 81 | 10 | 23 | 33 | 33 | — | — | — | — | — |
| 2018–19 | Edmonton Oilers | NHL | 70 | 6 | 3 | 9 | 33 | — | — | — | — | — |
| NHL totals | | | 917 | 129 | 167 | 296 | 462 | 57 | 5 | 7 | 12 | 16 |

== Awards and honours ==
| Awards | Year |
WHL
| East First All-Star Team | 2004 |
