= Steve Valiquette =

Canadian ice hockey player (born 1977)

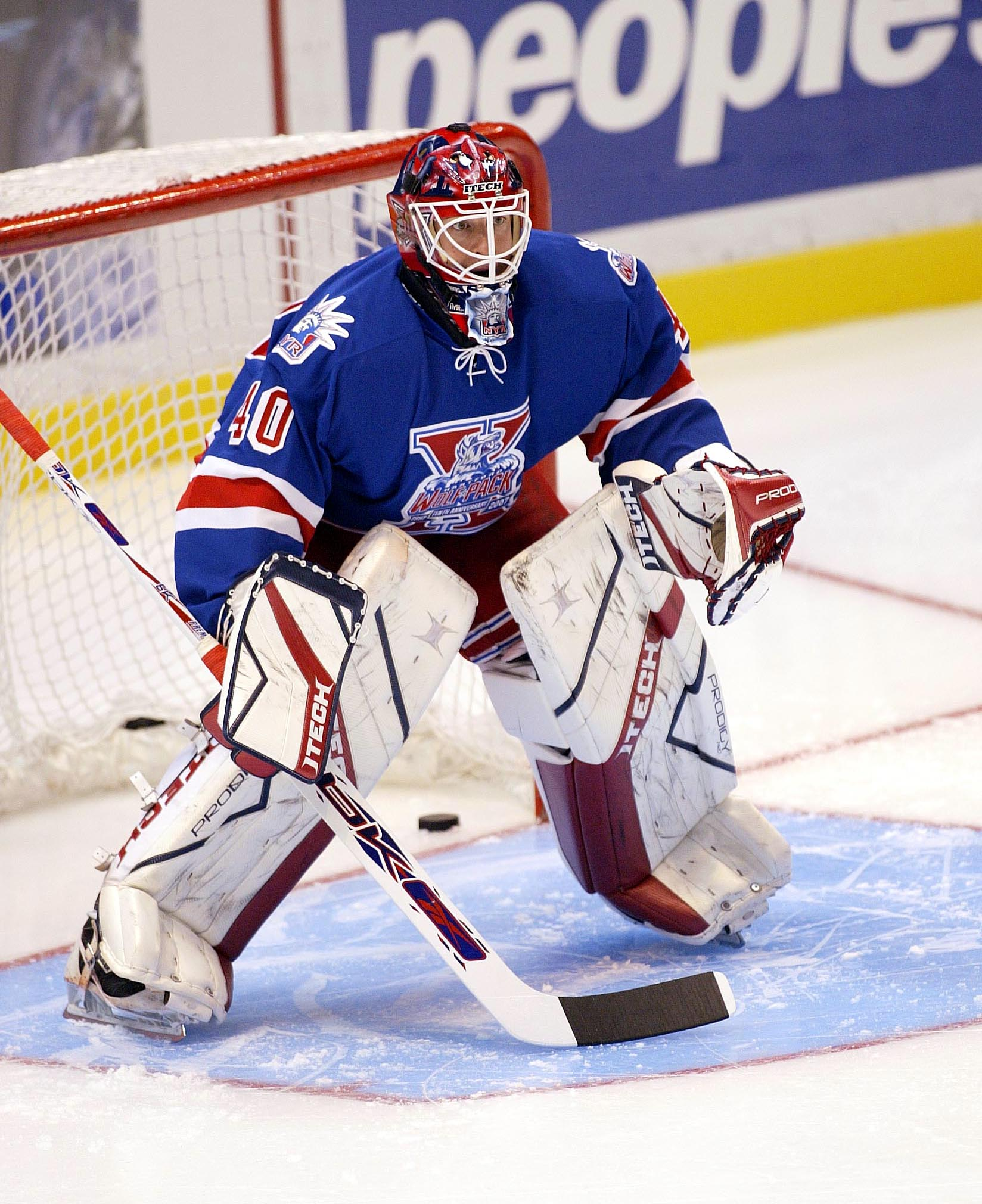
- Valiquette with the Hartford Wolf Pack in 2006
- Born: August 20, 1977 (age 48) Etobicoke, Ontario, Canada
- Height: 6 ft 6 in (198 cm)
- Weight: 210 lb (95 kg; 15 st 0 lb)
- Position: Goaltender
- Caught: Left
- Played for: New York Islanders; Edmonton Oilers; New York Rangers; Lokomotiv Yaroslavl; HC CSKA Moscow; HC Valpellice
- NHL draft: 190th overall, 1996; Los Angeles Kings
- Playing career: 2000–2012

Stephen Valiquette (born August 20, 1977) is a Canadian former professional ice hockey goaltender. Valiquette played 46 games in the National Hockey League, nearly all for the New York Rangers, before finishing his playing career in Europe.

Valiquette is currently employed as a studio analyst for MSG Network covering the Rangers.

== Professional career ==
While playing junior hockey for the Sudbury Wolves of the Ontario Hockey League (OHL), Valiquette was drafted by the Los Angeles Kings of the National Hockey League (NHL) in the 1996 NHL entry draft in the eighth round. Playing two more seasons in the OHL with the Wolves and the Erie Otters, Valiquette never actually played for the Kings organization, and in 1998, now a free agent, signed with the New York Islanders. Valiquette played in six NHL games for the Islanders in 1999-2000, but otherwise played for a variety of teams in the East Coast Hockey League (ECHL) and American Hockey League (AHL) through 2003. When Valiquette made his playing debut in 2000, he was the tallest goaltender to ever play a game in the NHL at 6-foot-6. Ben Bishop, standing 6-foot-7, has since surpassed Valiquette as the tallest NHL goaltender.

In July 2003, Valiquette signed as a free agent with the Edmonton Oilers. Three months later, he was claimed by the Florida Panthers in the NHL waiver draft on October 3, 2003. Six days later he was claimed back by the Edmonton Oilers. He appeared in one game with Edmonton, playing 14 minutes. Valiquette spent the balance of the 2003–04 season with the Toronto Roadrunners of the AHL, playing in 35 games.

On March 3, 2004, Valiquette was traded by the Oilers, along with forward Dwight Helminen and a second-round selection in the 2004 draft to the New York Rangers for center Petr Nedvěd and goaltender Jussi Markkanen. Valiquette spent the 2004–05 season with the Rangers' AHL affiliate, the Hartford Wolf Pack, during the NHL lockout. That season, he and teammate Jason LaBarbera shared the Harry "Hap" Holmes Memorial Award, awarded to the goalie (or goalies) with the league's lowest team goals against average. In fact, Valiquette owned the league's lowest goals against average with 1.77. He then signed with Lokomotiv Yaroslavl of the Russian Superleague on April 26, 2005.

In July 2006, the Rangers brought Valiquette back, and re-signed him. On March 3, 2007, he won his first game in the NHL in almost three years. With the departure of starting goalie Kevin Weekes to the New Jersey Devils, in July 2007, Valiquette became the back-up to Henrik Lundqvist. On January 31, 2008, against the Philadelphia Flyers, Valiquette recorded the first shutout of his NHL career, as the Rangers won 4-0. Ten days later, on February 9, he recorded his second consecutive shutout in a 2–0 win, also against the Flyers. He went on to finish the season 5-5-2. The following year, in a February 6, 2009 game against the Dallas Stars, he let 10 goals in a single game, a league worst for the season.

Valiquette appeared in his first career NHL playoff games with the Rangers during the first round of the 2009 Stanley Cup Playoffs against the Washington Capitals when he relieved starting goalie Henrik Lundqvist for the third period of games five and six, playing 40 minutes and allowing no goals on nine shots. Over the span of five seasons with the Rangers, Valiquette recorded 14 wins, 4 of them as shutouts. Shortly after what proved to be his final NHL game, an 8-3 loss to the Pittsburgh Penguins, in which he gave up all 8 goals, Valiquette was put on waivers, and subsequently sent to the Hartford Wolf Pack, in an effort to restore his game. He did not play for the Rangers again, and on July 15 Valiquette signed with the KHL side HC CSKA Moscow, who bought out his contract after one season.

During the summer of 2011, Valiquette turned down an offer to return to Lokomotiv Yaroslavl, due to a lack of guaranteed playing time. This proved fortunate for him, in light of the 2011 Lokomotiv Yaroslavl plane crash, which killed nearly the entire team and staff. Unsigned and not playing, it was announced in November 2011 that Valiquette, who runs a goalie school of his own, was taking a position at Quinnipiac University as the volunteer goalie coach for the men's NCAA team. However, a couple of days later, the AHL's Bridgeport Sound Tigers, for whom Valiquette had played while in the Islanders' system, put out a call for an emergency backup, as they were shorthanded due to injuries with their Islanders parent club. Ultimately, Valiquette wound up not having to play for the Sound Tigers, and moved on to play for HC Valpellice of the Italian Serie A league, which in 14 games, he led in save percentage and goals against average. After his season at HC Valpellice, Valiquette signed with Swedish club Djurgården of the HockeyAllsvenskan league, but instead retired due to injury.

== Career statistics ==
=== Regular season and playoffs ===
			Regular season										Playoffs
Season	Team	League	GP	W	L	T	OTL	MIN	GA	SO	GAA	SV%	GP	W	L	MIN	GA	SO	GAA	SV%
1993–94	Burlington Cougars	OPJHL	30	—	—	—	—	1663	112	1	4.04	—	—	—	—	—	—	—	—	—
1994–95	Rayside-Balfour Canadiens	NOJHL	2	0	2	0	—	89	12	0	8.09	—	—	—	—	—	—	—	—	—
1994–95	Smiths Falls Bears	CJHL	21	10	8	3	—	1275	75	0	3.53	—	—	—	—	—	—	—	—	—
1994–95	Sudbury Wolves	OHL	4	2	0	0	—	138	6	0	2.61	.949	—	—	—	—	—	—	—	—
1995–96	Sudbury Wolves	OHL	39	13	16	2	—	1887	123	0	3.91	.892	—	—	—	—	—	—	—	—
1996–97	Sudbury Wolves	OHL	61	21	29	7	—	3311	232	1	4.20	.899	—	—	—	—	—	—	—	—
1996–97	Dayton Bombers	ECHL	3	1	0	0	—	89	6	0	4.03	.882	—	—	—	—	—	—	—	—
1997–98	Sudbury Wolves	OHL	14	5	7	1	—	807	50	0	3.72	.904	—	—	—	—	—	—	—	—
1997–98	Erie Otters	OHL	28	16	7	3	—	1525	65	3	2.56	.917	—	—	—	—	—	—	—	—
1998–99	Hampton Roads Admirals	ECHL	31	18	7	3	—	1713	84	1	2.94	.916	—	—	—	—	—	—	—	—
1998–99	Lowell Lock Monsters	AHL	1	0	1	0	—	59	3	0	3.05	.885	—	—	—	—	—	—	—	—
1999–00	New York Islanders	NHL	6	2	0	0	—	193	6	0	1.87	.949	—	—	—	—	—	—	—	—
1999–00	Trenton Titans	ECHL	12	5	6	1	—	692	36	1	3.12	.902	—	—	—	—	—	—	—	—
1999–00	Providence Bruins	AHL	1	1	0	0	—	60	3	0	3.00	.927	—	—	—	—	—	—	—	—
1999–00	Lowell Lock Monsters	AHL	14	8	5	0	—	727	36	0	2.97	.901	—	—	—	—	—	—	—	—
2000–01	Springfield Falcons	AHL	20	7	10	1	—	1066	54	0	3.04	.907	—	—	—	—	—	—	—	—
2001–02	Bridgeport Sound Tigers	AHL	20	10	5	1	—	1071	45	2	2.52	.923	1	0	0	18	1	0	3.30	.800
2002–03	Bridgeport Sound Tigers	AHL	34	15	14	3	—	1962	86	2	2.63	.912	4	3	1	253	9	0	2.13	.931
2003–04	Edmonton Oilers	NHL	1	0	0	0	—	13	2	0	9.23	.714	—	—	—	—	—	—	—	—
2003–04	Toronto Roadrunners	AHL	35	14	14	5	—	2064	89	2	2.59	.913	—	—	—	—	—	—	—	—
2003–04	Hartford Wolf Pack	AHL	7	2	4	1	—	400	15	1	2.25	.928	1	0	0	11	0	0	0.00	1.000
2003–04	New York Rangers	NHL	2	1	1	0	—	119	6	0	3.03	.915	—	—	—	—	—	—	—	—
2004–05	Hartford Wolf Pack	AHL	35	19	11	—	1	1900	56	7	1.77	.935	2	1	1	118	4	0	2.03	.938
2005–06	Yaroslavl Lokomotiv	RSL	45	—	—	—	—	2734	89	4	1.95	.923	8	—	—	458	23	0	3.01	—
2006–07	New York Rangers	NHL	3	1	2	—	0	115	6	0	3.14	.867	—	—	—	—	—	—	—	—
2006–07	Hartford Wolf Pack	AHL	30	17	12	—	0	1694	66	6	2.34	.909	—	—	—	—	—	—	—	—
2007–08	New York Rangers	NHL	13	5	3	—	3	686	25	2	2.19	.916	—	—	—	—	—	—	—	—
2008–09	New York Rangers	NHL	15	5	5	—	2	823	39	1	2.84	.907	2	0	0	40	0	0	0.00	1.000
2009–10	New York Rangers	NHL	6	2	3	—	1	305	19	1	3.74	.852	—	—	—	—	—	—	—	—
2009–10	Hartford Wolf Pack	AHL	11	4	5	—	1	547	34	0	3.73	.877	—	—	—	—	—	—	—	—
2010–11	CSKA Moscow	KHL	35	9	16	—	5	1897	93	2	2.94	.897	—	—	—	—	—	—	—	—
2011–12	HC Valpellice	ITA	15	10	5	—	0	914	32	2	2.10	.940	—	—	—	—	—	—	—	—
NHL totals			46	16	14	0	5	2061	97	4	2.36	.905	2	0	0	40	0	0	0.00	1.000
KHL totals			35	9	16	—	5	1897	93	2	2.94	.897	—	—	—	—	—	—	—	—
