= Jan Horáček =

Czech ice hockey player

- Born: May 22, 1979 (age 46) Benešov, Czechoslovakia
- Height: 6 ft 4 in (193 cm)
- Weight: 221 lb (100 kg; 15 st 11 lb)
- Position: Defence
- Shot: Right
- Played for: HC Slavia Praha; Worcester IceCats; Peoria Rivermen; Hamilton Bulldogs; Havirov Femax HC; Toronto Roadrunners; HC Slovan Bratislava; HC Košice; HC Zlín; Vityaz Chekhov; Metallurg Novokuznetsk; Ritten Renon
- NHL draft: 98th overall, 1997; St. Louis Blues
- Playing career: 1995–2014

Jan Horáček (born 22 May, 1979) is a Czech former professional ice hockey player who last played with HC Vlasim in the Czech Republic.

== Career statistics ==
			Regular season					Playoffs
Season	Team	League	GP	G	A	Pts	PIM	GP	G	A	Pts	PIM
1994–95	HC Slavia Praha	Czech	2	0	0	0	0	—	—	—	—	—
1995–96	HC Slavia Praha	Czech	12	0	2	2	8	—	—	—	—	—
1996–97	HC Slavia Praha U20	Czech U20	25	4	14	18	—	—	—	—	—	—
1996–97	HC Slavia Praha	Czech	2	0	0	0	0	3	0	0	0	0
1996–97	HC Berounsti Medvedi	Czech2	2	0	0	0	—	—	—	—	—	—
1997–98	Moncton Wildcats	QMJHL	54	3	18	21	146	10	1	5	6	20
1998–99	HC Slavia Praha	Czech	1	0	0	0	2	—	—	—	—	—
1998–99	Worcester IceCats	AHL	53	1	13	14	119	4	0	0	0	6
1999–00	Worcester IceCats	AHL	68	1	8	9	145	9	0	0	0	2
2000–01	Peoria Rivermen	ECHL	6	0	3	3	8	—	—	—	—	—
2000–01	Worcester IceCats	AHL	11	0	1	1	20	2	0	0	0	2
2001–02	Hamilton Bulldogs	AHL	44	0	5	5	99	13	0	1	1	10
2002–03	HC Slavia Praha	Czech	4	0	0	0	4	—	—	—	—	—
2002–03	Bili Tygri Liberec	Czech	4	0	0	0	2	—	—	—	—	—
2002–03	HC Vsetin	Czech	19	1	2	3	86	—	—	—	—	—
2002–03	HC Havirov Panthers	Czech	12	0	3	3	22	—	—	—	—	—
2003–04	Toronto Roadrunners	AHL	11	0	1	1	20	—	—	—	—	—
2004–05	HC Slovan Bratislava	Slovak	52	3	6	9	110	15	0	0	0	73
2005–06	HC Kosice	Slovak	45	3	5	8	121	5	0	1	1	4
2006–07	HC Hamé Zlín	Czech	47	0	2	2	126	3	0	0	0	6
2006–07	HC Havirov Panthers	Czech2	2	0	0	0	2	—	—	—	—	—
2007–08	Vityaz Chekhov	Russia	49	4	7	11	97	—	—	—	—	—
2008–09	Metallurg Novokuznetsk	KHL	34	0	5	5	50	—	—	—	—	—
2009–10	HKM Zvolen	Slovak	13	0	1	1	10	—	—	—	—	—
2009–10	Ritten Sport	Italy	5	2	3	5	22	15	1	2	3	20
2010–11	HC Tabor	Czech2	18	1	8	9	75	—	—	—	—	—
2010–11	Asplöven HC	Division 1	13	1	7	8	18	10	1	1	2	20
2013–14	HC Vlasim	Czech4	—	—	—	—	—	—	—	—	—	—
AHL totals			187	2	28	30	403	28	0	1	1	20
Czech totals			103	1	9	10	250	6	0	0	0	6
Slovak totals			110	6	12	18	241	20	0	1	1	77
