= Brad Winchester =

American ice hockey player

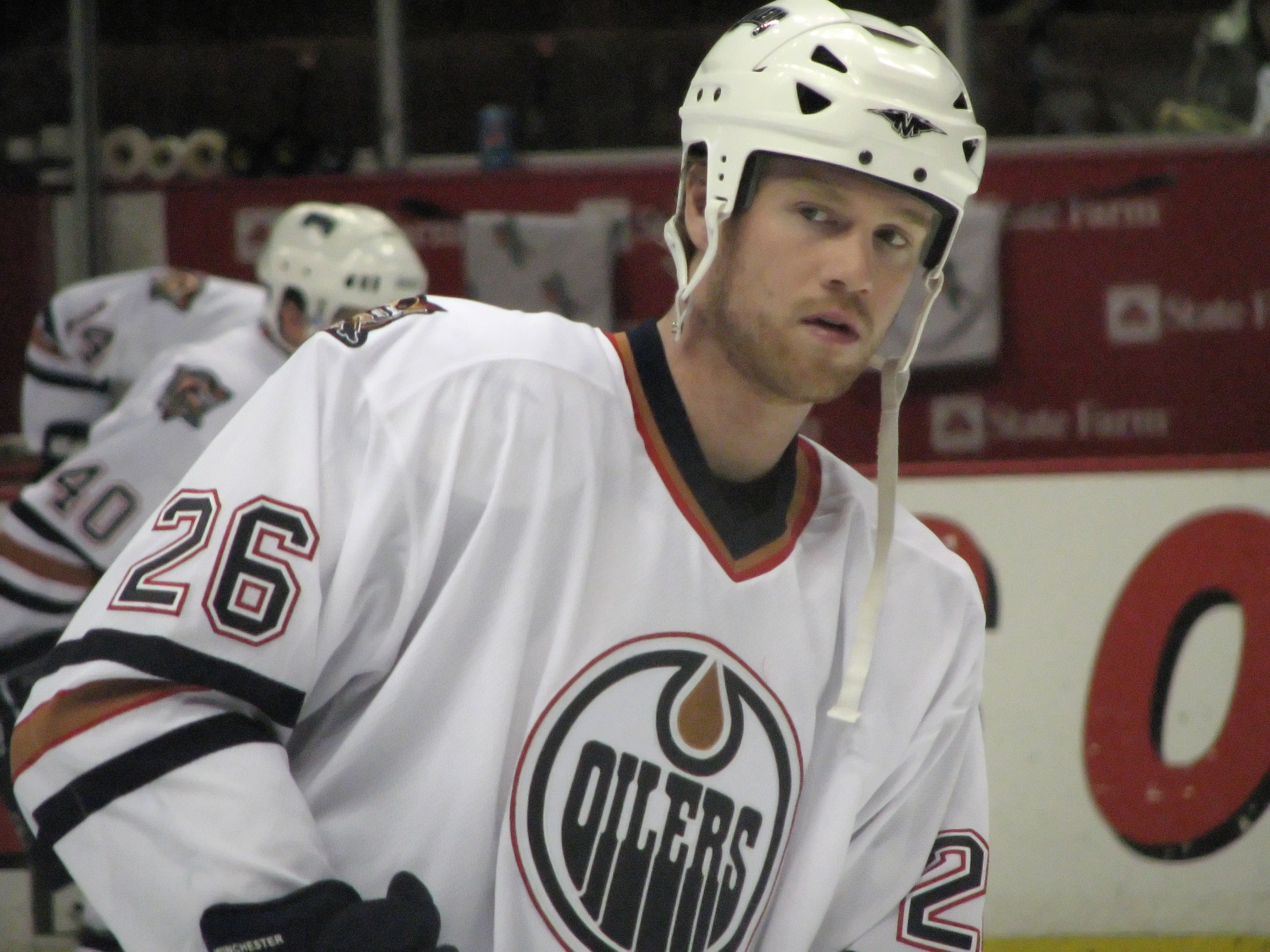
- Winchester with the Edmonton Oilers in 2007
- Born: March 1, 1981 (age 45) Madison, Wisconsin, U.S.
- Height: 6 ft 5 in (196 cm)
- Weight: 228 lb (103 kg; 16 st 4 lb)
- Position: Left wing
- Shot: Left
- Played for: Edmonton Oilers; Dallas Stars; St. Louis Blues; Anaheim Ducks; San Jose Sharks
- National team: United States
- NHL draft: 35th overall, 2000; Edmonton Oilers
- Playing career: 2003–2015
- Coaching career

Current position
- Title: Assistant coach
- Team: Wisconsin
- Conference: Big Ten

Biographical details
- Education: University of Wisconsin–Madison

Coaching career (HC unless noted)
- 2018–Present: Wisconsin (Assistant)

Bradley A. Winchester (born March 1, 1981) is an American former professional ice hockey left winger. He was selected in the second round of the 2000 NHL entry draft, 35th overall, by the Edmonton Oilers.

== Playing career ==
Winchester spent two seasons with the U.S. National Team Development Program, then moved to his hometown University of Wisconsin–Madison, where he played for four seasons. At six feet, five inches tall and 228 pounds, was the largest player the Oilers had drafted since the 1995 NHL entry draft. In December 2000, Winchester participated in the World Junior Hockey Championship with the United States, finishing in fourth position.

Winchester made his professional debut in the 2003–04 American Hockey League season, playing for Edmonton's farm affiliate, the Toronto Roadrunners. He moved with the team to Edmonton during the 2004–05 NHL lockout, where he tied for the team lead in goals and was six points behind Tony Salmelainen and Raffi Torres for the team scoring lead. Winchester split 2005–06 between the Oilers and the Hamilton Bulldogs, going scoreless during the NHL regular season but scoring the game-winning goal in his playoff debut, the second game of a series with the number one seeded Detroit Red Wings. His goal gave the eighth seeded Oilers their first win in the series on the road. The Oilers went on to lose to the Carolina Hurricanes in seven games of the Stanley Cup Finals, with Winchester spending most of the latter games as a healthy scratch.

On June 26, 2007, the Oilers declined to make Winchester a qualifying offer, which allowed him to become an unrestricted free agent as of July 1, and on the 6th, he signed with the Dallas Stars. After playing in 41 games for Dallas in 2007–08, Winchester signed with the St. Louis Blues on July 10, 2008. He was recalled from the Blues' Peoria Rivermen (AHL) affiliate on November 20, 2008.

On February 28, 2011, Winchester was traded from the Blues to the Anaheim Ducks for a 3rd round draft pick in 2012.

On October 3, 2011, Winchester signed a one-year, $725,000 deal with the San Jose Sharks.

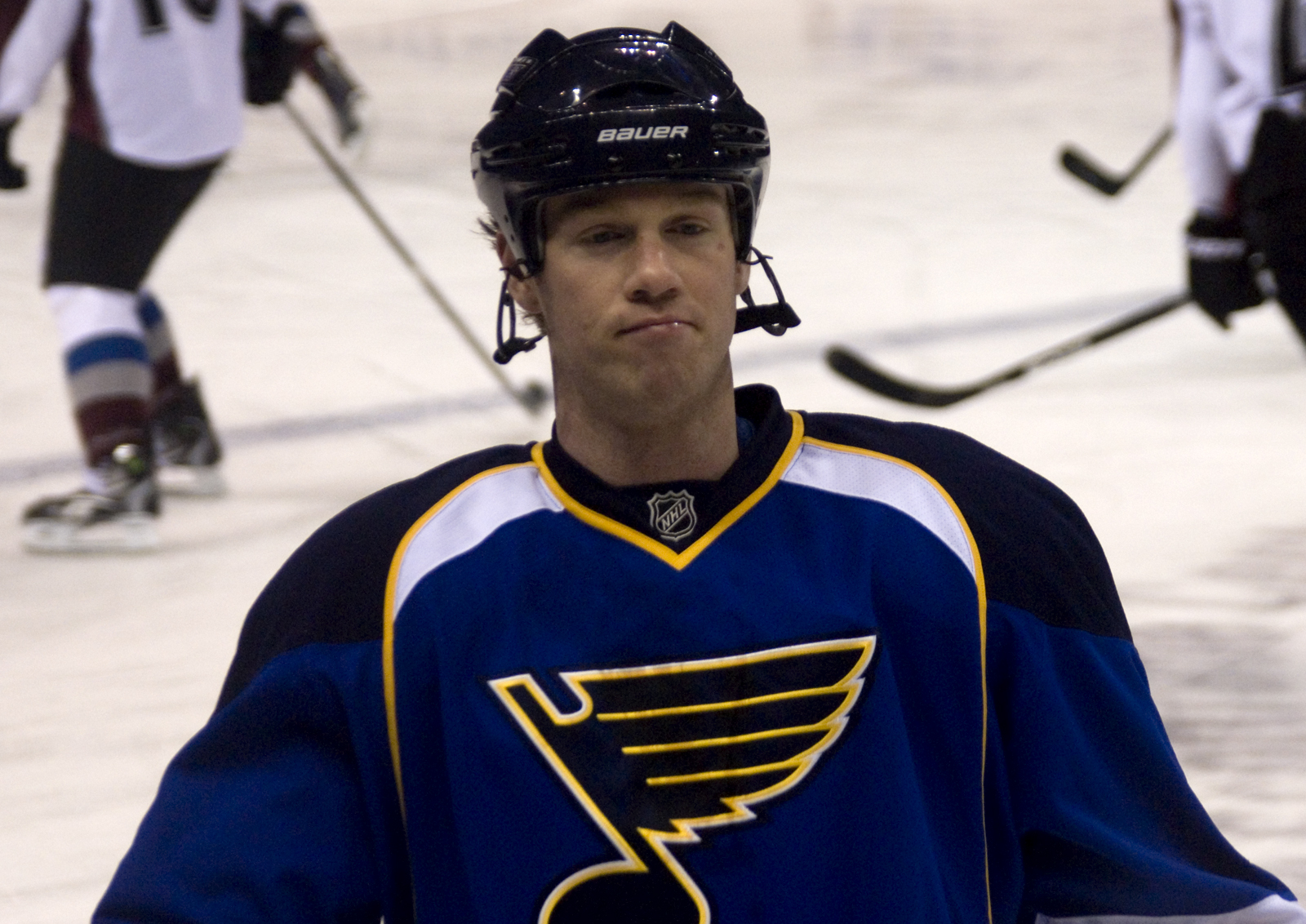
Winchester with the St. Louis Blues

A free agent through the duration of the 2012–13 NHL lockout, Winchester accepted a try-out to the Calgary Flames training camp once the dispute was resolved on January 12, 2013. At the conclusion of camp, Winchester was unsuccessful and released by the Flames. On January 22, midway through the 2012–13 AHL season, Winchester signed a professional try-out with the Milwaukee Admirals.

On July 24, 2013, Winchester agreed to a one-year contract as a free agent with the Chicago Blackhawks. He was assigned to AHL affiliate, the Rockford IceHogs, to start the 2013–14 season. On February 26, 2014, Winchester was traded by the Blackhawks to the Minnesota Wild in exchange for Brian Connelly. Winchester was not re-signed by the Wild after the conclusion of the season and on September 11, 2014, the Norfolk Admirals announced they had signed him. Winchester recorded 9 points in 15 games before suffering a shoulder injury with the Admirals on January 15, 2015. Winchester was traded by Norfolk to the Oklahoma City Barons for future considerations on March 6, 2015.

On September 17, 2015, Winchester announced he was retiring from professional hockey.

== Personal ==
In December 2012, Brad and his father, the former NCAA standout Gary Winchester, were honored by the Wisconsin Badgers when they were selected as honorary captains for the team's games held on December 13 and 14.

== Career statistics ==
=== Regular season and playoffs ===
			Regular season					Playoffs
Season	Team	League	GP	G	A	Pts	PIM	GP	G	A	Pts	PIM
1997–98	U.S. NTDP Juniors	USHL	5	2	1	3	6	—	—	—	—	—
1997–98	U.S. NTDP U18	NAHL	40	11	17	28	84	—	—	—	—	—
1998–99	U.S. NTDP Juniors	USHL	48	14	23	37	103	—	—	—	—	—
1999–2000	University of Wisconsin–Madison	WCHA	33	9	9	18	48	—	—	—	—	—
2000–01	University of Wisconsin–Madison	WCHA	41	7	9	16	71	—	—	—	—	—
2001–02	University of Wisconsin–Madison	WCHA	38	14	20	34	38	—	—	—	—	—
2002–03	University of Wisconsin–Madison	WCHA	38	10	6	16	58	—	—	—	—	—
2003–04	Toronto Roadrunners	AHL	65	13	6	19	85	3	0	0	0	2
2004–05	Edmonton Road Runners	AHL	76	22	18	40	143	—	—	—	—	—
2005–06	Edmonton Oilers	NHL	19	0	1	1	21	10	1	2	3	4
2005–06	Hamilton Bulldogs	AHL	40	26	14	40	118	—	—	—	—	—
2006–07	Edmonton Oilers	NHL	59	4	5	9	86	—	—	—	—	—
2007–08	Dallas Stars	NHL	41	1	2	3	46	6	0	0	0	8
2007–08	Iowa Stars	AHL	1	0	0	0	2	—	—	—	—	—
2008–09	St. Louis Blues	NHL	64	13	8	21	89	4	0	0	0	10
2008–09	Peoria Rivermen	AHL	13	4	2	6	46	—	—	—	—	—
2009–10	St. Louis Blues	NHL	64	3	5	8	108	—	—	—	—	—
2010–11	St. Louis Blues	NHL	57	9	5	14	86	—	—	—	—	—
2010–11	Anaheim Ducks	NHL	19	1	1	2	28	3	0	0	0	4
2011–12	San Jose Sharks	NHL	67	6	4	10	88	1	0	0	0	0
2012–13	Milwaukee Admirals	AHL	37	9	18	27	66	2	0	1	1	2
2013–14	Rockford IceHogs	AHL	55	16	14	30	85	—	—	—	—	—
2013–14	Iowa Wild	AHL	23	3	5	8	64	—	—	—	—	—
2014–15	Norfolk Admirals	AHL	15	4	5	9	39	—	—	—	—	—
2014–15	Oklahoma City Barons	AHL	11	1	0	1	8	10	0	0	0	10
AHL totals			336	98	82	180	656	15	0	1	1	14
NHL totals			390	37	31	68	552	24	1	2	3	26

=== International ===
Year	Team	Event	Result	GP	G	A	Pts	PIM
1999	United States	WJC18	7th	6	0	3	3	6
2000	United States	WJC	4th	7	0	0	0	6
Junior totals				13	0	3	3	12
