= Toronto Roadrunners =

- City: Toronto, Ontario
- League: American Hockey League
- Operated: 2003–2004
- Home arena: Ricoh Coliseum
- Colors: Blue, yellow, and grey
- Affiliates: Edmonton Oilers

Franchise history
- 1984–1988: Nova Scotia Oilers
- 1988–1996: Cape Breton Oilers
- 1996–2003: Hamilton Bulldogs
- 2003–2004: Toronto Roadrunners
- 2004–2005: Edmonton Road Runners
- 2010–2015: Oklahoma City Barons
- 2015–present: Bakersfield Condors

The Toronto Roadrunners were an ice hockey team in the American Hockey League. They played in Toronto, Ontario, Canada at the Ricoh Coliseum. In their only season the Roadrunners featured players such as Jani Rita, Brad Winchester, Jamie Wright and Steve Valiquette who helped them advance to the AHL playoffs where they lost the first round to the Cleveland Barons.

== History ==
In the early 2000s, there were efforts to refurbish CNE Coliseum for a minor professional team. Plans to move the dormant Phoenix Roadrunners of the International Hockey League to Toronto for the 2002–03 season fell apart when the league dissolved and six teams, but not the Roadrunners, were absorbed by the American Hockey League (AHL) in the summer of 2001. The same group then attempted to purchase the Louisville Panthers AHL franchise, which had suspended operations for the 2001–02 season, and relocate it to the Coliseum, but the AHL voted against the transaction in December 2001. The Toronto Maple Leafs pressured the Hamilton Bulldogs, who held territorial rights to Toronto since it fell within their 50-mile home territory, to veto the transaction. The Leafs reportedly did not want the Coliseum to be upgraded as it would compete with their newly opened Air Canada Centre. Next, the group began pursuing the Bulldogs, which were owned by the NHL's Edmonton Oilers. The Bulldogs did not require league approval to move to Toronto since the Coliseum was within their territory.

After an agreement was reached with the Oilers to relocate the Bulldogs to Toronto, and to rename them the Toronto Roadrunners, the City of Toronto agreed to an extensive renovation of the Coliseum for the team in November 2002. At a cost of $38 million, the arena's capacity was expanded from 6,500 to 9,700 by building a new higher roof, lowering the floor and adding new seats in the expanded area. As part of the renovation, the city sold naming rights to Ricoh Canada. The renovated building has 38 private suites. Simultaneously, the Quebec Citadelles were moved to Hamilton to replace the Bulldogs.

While initial owner Lyle Abrhams brought the franchise to Toronto with good intentions, poor attendance except when playing the St. John's Maple Leafs, a questionable business model, and a dispute with building officials resulted in the relocation of the franchise to Edmonton, Alberta after only one season, becoming the Edmonton Road Runners. Another factor was the desire of the parent club to have the team play in Edmonton to fill the void due to the expected 2004–05 NHL lockout. Since Abrhams owned the rights to the name and logo, the Roadrunners name and identity returned as the Phoenix RoadRunners in the ECHL and later would resurface as the Tucson Roadrunners in the AHL in 2016. The void in Toronto was filled in 2005 when the St. John's Maple Leafs relocated from Atlantic Canada to the Ricoh Coliseum and became the Toronto Marlies.

== Team records ==
Goals: 25 Jamie Wright
Assists: 30 Jamie Wright
Points: 55 Jamie Wright
Penalty Minutes: 196 Rocky Thompson
GAA: 2.52 Mike Morrison
SV%: .913 Mike Morrison, Stephen Valiquette
Goaltending Wins: 14 Steve Valiquette
Shutouts: 3 Mike Morrison, Tyler Moss
Games: 78 Jamie Wright

Affiliates

- Edmonton Oilers (2003–2004)

== Roster ==
2004–2005

- Head coach: Geoff Ward

Players

- 24 Jamie Wright
- 8 Tony Salmelainen
- 22 Jani Rita
- 7 Doug Lynch
- 13 Nate DiCasmirro
- 38 Mike Bishai
- 23 Joe Cullen
- 25 J. J. Hunter
- 37 Sean McAslan
- 33 Mikko Luoma
- 27 Michael Henrich
- 19 Jeff Woywitka
- 51 David Roche
- 10 Brad Winchester
- 18 Peter Sarno
- 5 Bobby Allen
- 26 Dan Tessier
- 6 Dan Smith
- 15 Dan Baum
- 2 Rocky Thompson
- 21 Marc-Andre Bergeron
- 55 Igor Ulanov
- 34 Peter Hogan
- 36 Mathieu Roy
- 30 David Cousineau
- 12 Jan Horacek
- 14 Brent Henley
- 40 Steve Valiquette
- 38 Jason Platt
- 16 Jean-Francois Plourde
- 20 Zack Stortini
- 32 David Belitski
- 44 Ryan Christie
- 29 Chris Madden
- 29 Tyler Moss
- 1 Mike Morrison

== Season-by-season results ==
Season	Games	Won	Lost	Tied	OTL	Points	Goals for	Goals against	Standing	Playoffs
2003–04	80	35	34	8	3	81	219	224	5th, North	Lost Qualifier, 1–2, Cleveland

== See also ==
- List of ice hockey teams in Ontario
