= Edmonton Road Runners =

- City: Edmonton, Alberta, Canada
- League: American Hockey League
- Operated: 2004–05
- Home arena: Rexall Place
- Colors: Blue, red, and gold
- Affiliates: Edmonton Oilers

Franchise history
- 1984–1988: Nova Scotia Oilers
- 1988–1996: Cape Breton Oilers
- 1996–2003: Hamilton Bulldogs
- 2003–2004: Toronto Roadrunners
- 2004–2005: Edmonton Road Runners
- 2010–2015: Oklahoma City Barons
- 2015–present: Bakersfield Condors

The Edmonton Road Runners were an ice hockey team in the American Hockey League. They played in Edmonton, Alberta, Canada at Rexall Place.

== History ==
After the 2003–04 season the Edmonton Oilers announced that the Toronto Roadrunners would play the 2004–05 season in Edmonton, where they were based in the Oilers' own arena, Rexall Place. The NHL team's decision to re-locate its affiliate to Edmonton was an unusual one for a North American professional sports organization, and was likely influenced by the expectation that the 2004–05 NHL lockout would wipe out the 2004–05 NHL season. The expectation proved accurate, as the season was officially cancelled on February 16, 2005. With no NHL hockey for the season, the team proved highly successful at the gate, finishing third in the AHL in attendance at 8,854 fans per game despite a disappointing season plagued by injury.

Despite the franchise's short term success, the Oilers' owners realized that Edmonton could probably not support both NHL and AHL franchises in the long term, and Edmonton was never intended to be a permanent location for the Roadrunners. The eventual plan was to re-locate the Roadrunners to Credit Union Centre in Saskatoon, Saskatchewan as part of a transaction that would have re-located the Western Hockey League's Saskatoon Blades to Edmonton in exchange. However, an agreement could not be reached with the owners of the Blades. Without their backing Credit Union Centre was unavailable to the Roadrunners as the terms of the Blades' lease precludes its abrogation save for the relocation of an NHL team to the facility. As a result, the team announced on June 6, 2005 that they were requesting permission from the American Hockey League to suspend team operations. The decision was likely motivated by the improving lockout negotiations and the widespread belief that the Oilers would be back for the 2005–06 season, which was confirmed when the owners and players agreed on July 13, 2005, to a new six-year collective bargaining agreement.

Though the Oilers chose first to maintain split AHL affiliations in 2005–06 and 2007–08, then make a conventional agreement with the Springfield Falcons for the next three seasons, they retained the rights to the dormant Road Runners franchise. The franchise was resurrected as the Oklahoma City Barons in the 2010–11 season.

== Season-by-season results ==
Season	Games	Won	Lost	Tied	SOL	Points	Goals for	Goals against	Standing	Playoffs
2004–05	80	32	33	11	4	79	201	223	6th, North	Did not qualify

== Team records ==
Goals: 22 (Finland) Tony Salmelainen, (United States) Brad Winchester
Assists: 26 (Canada) Kyle Brodziak
Points: 46 (Finland) Tony Salmelainen, (Canada) Raffi Torres
Penalty minutes: 231 (Canada) Rocky Thompson
GAA: 2.63 (Canada) Tyler Moss
SV%: .906 Tyler Moss
Goaltending wins: 24 Tyler Moss
Shutouts: 5 Tyler Moss
Games: 80 (Canada) Jeff Woywitka

Affiliates

- Edmonton Oilers (2004-2005)

== See also ==
- List of ice hockey teams in Alberta
