= 2004–05 AHL season =

- League: American Hockey League
- Sport: Ice hockey
- Teams: 28

Regular season
- Macgregor Kilpatrick Trophy: Rochester Americans
- Runners-up: Manchester Monarchs
- Season MVP: Jason Spezza (Binghamton)
- Top scorer: Jason Spezza (Binghamton)

Playoffs
- Playoffs MVP: Antero Niittymaki (Philadelphia)

Calder Cup
- Champions: Philadelphia Phantoms
- Runners-up: Chicago Wolves

AHL seasons
- 2003–04 2005–06

The 2004–05 AHL season was the 69th season of the American Hockey League. Twenty-eight teams played 80 games each in the schedule. The Rochester Americans finished first overall in the regular season. The Philadelphia Phantoms won the Calder Cup, defeating the Chicago Wolves in the finals.

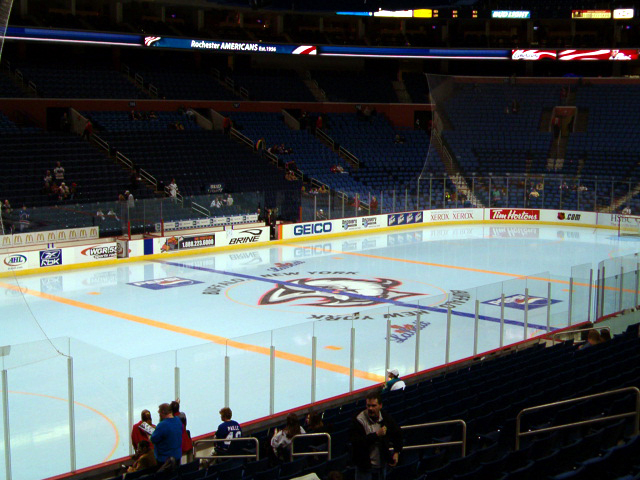
Ice experimentation during a Rochester Americans game at HSBC Arena (now KeyBank Center) in Buffalo, New York

This season featured a wealth of talent in the AHL, as the National Hockey League was in the midst of a lockout which would cause that league's 2004–05 season to be canceled on February 16, 2005. Many players who otherwise may have been called up to be members of NHL teams for the season spent the full season in the AHL instead. The lockout also provided opportunity for several NHL arenas — including those in Anaheim, Buffalo, Nashville, San Jose and Tampa — to host AHL games during the season. The Edmonton Road Runners, meanwhile, played the entire season in Rexall Place, normally the home of the NHL's Edmonton Oilers.

In addition, the shootout (previously used in the 1986–87 season) was reintroduced to the league, to decide a winner in games which remained tied following the overtime period. The team winning a shootout was credited with a win, and the losing team with an overtime loss.

The AHL also announced a series of experimental rule changes, most notably a restricted area for goaltenders. Playing the puck outside the restricted area results in an automatic two-minute delay of game penalty.

== Team changes ==
- The Toronto Roadrunners moved to Edmonton, Alberta, becoming the Edmonton Road Runners.

== Final standings ==
- y– indicates team clinched division and a playoff spot
- x– indicates team clinched a playoff spot
- e– indicates team was eliminated from playoff contention

=== Eastern Conference ===
Atlantic Division	GP	W	L	OTL	SOL	Pts	GF	GA
y–Manchester Monarchs (LAK)	80	51	21	4	4	110	258	176
x–Hartford Wolf Pack (NYR)	80	50	24	3	3	106	206	160
x–Lowell Lock Monsters (CGY/CAR)	80	47	27	5	1	100	242	190
x–Providence Bruins (BOS)	80	40	30	7	3	90	211	202
e–Worcester Ice Cats (STL)	80	39	34	3	4	85	212	223
e–Portland Pirates (WSH)	80	34	34	6	6	80	175	242
e–Springfield Falcons (TBL)	80	24	47	3	6	57	161	255

East Division	GP	W	L	OTL	SOL	Pts	GF	GA
y–Binghamton Senators (OTT)	80	47	21	7	5	106	276	217
x–Philadelphia Phantoms (PHI)	80	48	25	4	3	103	235	185
x–Norfolk Admirals (CHI)	80	43	30	6	1	93	200	188
x–Wilkes-Barre/Scranton Penguins (PIT)	80	39	27	7	7	92	227	219
e–Hershey Bears (COL)	80	39	37	2	2	82	207	226
e–Bridgeport Sound Tigers (NYI)	80	37	38	1	4	79	192	222
e–Albany River Rats (NJD)	80	29	38	6	7	71	198	248

=== Western Conference ===
North Division	GP	W	L	OTL	SOL	Pts	GF	GA
y–Rochester Americans (BUF)	80	51	19	4	6	112	243	208
x–St. John's Maple Leafs (TOR)	80	46	28	5	1	98	244	232
x–Manitoba Moose (VAN)	80	44	26	7	3	98	243	210
x–Hamilton Bulldogs (DAL/MTL)	80	38	29	6	7	89	225	210
e–Syracuse Crunch (CBJ)	80	36	33	4	7	83	215	230
e–Edmonton Road Runners (EDM)	80	32	33	11	4	79	201	223
e–Cleveland Barons (SJS)	80	35	37	6	2	78	200	226

West Division	GP	W	L	OTL	SOL	Pts	GF	GA
y–Chicago Wolves (ATL)	80	49	24	2	5	105	245	211
x–Milwaukee Admirals (NSH)	80	47	24	5	4	103	247	207
x–Cincinnati Mighty Ducks (ANA)	80	44	31	4	1	93	206	191
x–Houston Aeros (MIN)	80	40	28	6	6	92	212	195
e–Grand Rapids Griffins (DET)	80	41	35	2	2	86	200	200
e–San Antonio Rampage (FLA)	80	27	45	5	3	62	156	232
e–Utah Grizzlies (PHX)	80	23	50	5	2	53	156	265

== Scoring leaders ==
Note: GP = Games played; G = Goals; A = Assists; Pts = Points; PIM = Penalty minutes

Player	Team	GP	G	A	Pts	PIM
Jason Spezza	Binghamton Senators	80	32	85	117	50
Mike Cammalleri	Manchester Monarchs	79	46	63	109	60
David Ling	St. John's Maple Leafs	80	28	60	88	152
Kyle Wellwood	St. John's Maple Leafs	80	38	49	87	20
Simon Gamache	Milwaukee Admirals	80	29	57	86	93
Peter Sarno	Manitoba Moose	80	16	66	82	53
Chris Taylor	Rochester Americans	79	21	58	79	50
Andy Hilbert	Providence Bruins	79	37	42	79	83
Denis Hamel	Binghamton Senators	80	39	39	78	75
Eric Staal	Lowell Lock Monsters	77	26	51	77	88

== Leading goaltenders ==
Note: GP = Games played; Mins = Minutes Played; W = Wins; L = Losses: OTL = Overtime Losses; SL = Shootout Losses; GA = Goals Allowed; SO = Shutouts; GAA = Goals Against Average

Player	Team	GP	Mins	W	L	SL	GA	SO	GAA	Sv%
Steve Valiquette	Hartford Wolf Pack	35	1900	19	11	1	56	7	1.77	0.935
Jason LaBarbera	Hartford Wolf Pack	53	2937	31	16	2	90	6	1.84	0.934
Adam Hauser	Manchester Monarchs	32	1867	19	11	0	60	5	1.93	0.933
Cam Ward	Lowell Lock Monsters	50	2829	27	17	3	94	6	1.99	0.937
Josh Harding	Houston Aeros	42	2388	21	16	3	80	4	2.01	0.930

== Calder Cup Playoffs ==
Division Semi-finals	Division Finals
A1	Manchester	2
A4	Providence	4
A4	Providence	4
A3	Lowell	1
A2	Hartford	2
A3	Lowell	4
Eastern
E1	Binghamton	2
E4	WBS	4
E4	WBS	1
E2	Philadelphia	4
E2	Philadelphia	4
E3	Norfolk	2
N1	Rochester	4
N4	Hamilton	0
N1	Rochester	1
N3	Manitoba	4
N2	St. John's	1
N3	Manitoba	4
Western
W1	Chicago	4
W4	Houston	1
W1	Chicago	4
W3	Cincinnati	1
W2	Milwaukee	3
W3	Cincinnati	4

Conference Finals
A	Providence	2
E	Philadelphia	4
N	Manitoba	0
W	Chicago	4

Calder Cup Finals
E	Philadelphia	4
W	Chicago	0

== All Star Classic ==
The 18th AHL All-Star Classic was played on February 14, 2005, at the Verizon Wireless Arena in Manchester, New Hampshire. Team PlanetUSA defeated team Canada 5–4 in a shootout win. In the skills competition held the night before, team PlanetUSA defeated team Canada 17–13.

== Trophy and award winners ==
=== Team awards ===
Calder Cup; Playoff champions:	Philadelphia Phantoms
Richard F. Canning Trophy; Eastern Conference playoff champions:	Philadelphia Phantoms
Robert W. Clarke Trophy; Western Conference playoff champions:	Chicago Wolves
Macgregor Kilpatrick Trophy; Regular season champions, League:	Rochester Americans
Frank Mathers Trophy; Regular Season champions, Eastern Conference:	Manchester Monarchs
Norman R. "Bud" Poile Trophy; Regular Season champions, Western Conference:	Rochester Americans
Emile Francis Trophy; Regular Season champions, Atlantic Division:	Manchester Monarchs
F. G. "Teddy" Oke Trophy; Regular Season champions, East Division:	Binghamton Senators
Sam Pollock Trophy; Regular Season champions, North Division:	Rochester Americans
John D. Chick Trophy; Regular Season champions, West Division:	Chicago Wolves

=== Individual awards ===
Les Cunningham Award; Most valuable player:	Jason Spezza - Binghamton Senators
John B. Sollenberger Trophy; Top point scorer:	Jason Spezza - Binghamton Senators
Willie Marshall Award; Top goal scorer:	Mike Cammalleri - Manchester Monarchs
Dudley "Red" Garrett Memorial Award; Rookie of the year:	Rene Bourque - Norfolk Admirals
Eddie Shore Award; Defenceman of the year:	Niklas Kronwall - Grand Rapids Griffins
Aldege "Baz" Bastien Memorial Award; Best Goaltender:	Ryan Miller - Rochester Americans
Harry "Hap" Holmes Memorial Award; Lowest goals against average:	Jason LaBarbera - Hartford Wolf Pack; Steve Valiquette - Hartford Wolf Pack
Louis A. R. Pieri Memorial Award; Coach of the year:	Randy Cunneyworth - Rochester Americans
Fred T. Hunt Memorial Award; Sportsmanship / Perseverance:	Chris Taylor - Rochester Americans
Yanick Dupre Memorial Award; Community Service Award:	Duncan Milroy - Hamilton Bulldogs
Jack A. Butterfield Trophy; MVP of the playoffs:	Antero Niittymaki - Philadelphia Phantoms

=== Other awards ===
James C. Hendy Memorial Award; Most outstanding executive:	Mark Chipman, Manitoba Moose
Thomas Ebright Memorial Award; Career contributions:	Glenn Stanford
James H. Ellery Memorial Awards; Outstanding media coverage:	Jonathan Bombulie, Wilkes-Barre/Scranton (newspaper); Derek Wills, Hamilton (radio); Brendan O'Reilly, Binghamton (television)
Ken McKenzie Award; Outstanding marketing executive:	Brian Lewis, Hamilton Bulldogs
Michael Condon Memorial Award; Outstanding service, on-ice official:	Matt Dunne

== See also ==
- List of AHL seasons

Preceded by 2003–04 AHL season	AHL seasons	Succeeded by 2005–06 AHL season
