= 2007–08 Columbus Blue Jackets season =

National Hockey League season

2007–08 Columbus Blue Jackets
- Division: 4th Central
- Conference: 13th Western
- 2007–08 record: 34–36–12
- Home record: 20–14–7
- Road record: 14–22–5
- Goals for: 193
- Goals against: 218

Team information
- General manager: Scott Howson
- Coach: Ken Hitchcock
- Captain: Adam Foote (Oct.–Feb.); Rick Nash (Feb.–Apr.)
- Alternate captains: Sergei Fedorov (Oct.–Feb.); Rostislav Klesla (Feb.–Apr.); Fredrik Modin; Rick Nash (Oct.–Feb.); Michael Peca (Feb.–Apr.); David Vyborny
- Arena: Nationwide Arena
- Average attendance: 15,146 (83.5%)

Team leaders
- Goals: Rick Nash (38)
- Assists: Nikolay Zherdev (35)
- Points: Rick Nash (69)
- Penalty minutes: Jared Boll (226)
- Plus/minus: Jan Hejda (+20)
- Wins: Pascal Leclaire (24)
- Goals against average: Pascal Leclaire (2.25)

The 2007–08 Columbus Blue Jackets season began October 5, 2007. It was the Blue Jackets' eighth season in the National Hockey League (NHL). The Blue Jackets did not qualify for the 2008 Stanley Cup playoffs for the seventh year in a row for the first time in franshise history..

Key dates prior to the start of the season:

- The 2007 NHL entry draft took place in Columbus, Ohio, on June 22–23
- The free agency period began on July 1.
- The Blue Jackets played 8 preseason games starting September 16.

The Blue Jackets attempted to qualify for the playoffs for the first time in franchise history. Scott Howson was hired prior to the 2007 NHL entry draft as the second general manager in team history, replacing Doug MacLean. The Blue Jackets finished with a 34–36–12 record, earning 80 points and missing the playoffs. The Blue Jackets finished fourth in the Central Division, finishing above the St. Louis Blues and 13th in the Western Conference. On March 16, 2008, Columbus set a franchise record for points in a season, 75, with a 4–3 win over the Detroit Red Wings in Columbus.

The Blue Jackets started off the season well with a 7–3–1 record in October, but falling behind in the Western Conference in November with a 4–7–3 record. During the All-star break, Rick Nash was selected to participate in the 2008 All-Star Game for the Western Conference. He scored a record-breaking goal just 12 seconds into the period. Nash scored three goals in the game, yet the Eastern Conference won the game 8–7. The Blue Jackets earned average records in December through February, staying within reach of a playoff spot. On February 26, Captain Adam Foote was traded to the Colorado Avalanche in exchange for two draft picks. Rick Nash was named the new captain of the team. In March, the Blue Jackets' chances of playing in the post-season were fading away after a 4–6–3 record due to the injury of starting goaltender Pascal Leclaire. After being mathematically eliminated from making the playoffs, the Blue Jackets lost their last three games of the season.

== Regular season ==
=== Divisional standings ===
Central Division
		GP	W	L	OTL	GF	GA	Pts
**1**	**p – Detroit Red Wings**	**82**	**54**	**21**	**7**	**257**	**184**	**115**
**2**	**Nashville Predators**	**82**	**41**	**32**	**9**	**230**	**229**	**91**
3	Chicago Blackhawks	82	40	34	8	239	235	88
4	Columbus Blue Jackets	82	34	36	12	193	218	80
5	St. Louis Blues	82	33	36	13	205	237	79

=== Conference standings ===
Western Conference
R		Div	GP	W	L	OTL	GF	GA	Pts
**1**	**p – Detroit Red Wings**	**CE**	**82**	**54**	**21**	**7**	**257**	**184**	115
**2**	**y – San Jose Sharks**	**PA**	**82**	**49**	**23**	**10**	**222**	**193**	108
**3**	**y – Minnesota Wild**	**NW**	**82**	**44**	**28**	**10**	**223**	**218**	98
**4**	**Anaheim Ducks**	**PA**	**82**	**47**	**27**	**8**	**205**	**191**	102
**5**	**Dallas Stars**	**PA**	**82**	**45**	**30**	**7**	**242**	**207**	97
**6**	**Colorado Avalanche**	**NW**	**82**	**44**	**31**	**7**	**231**	**219**	95
**7**	**Calgary Flames**	**NW**	**82**	**42**	**30**	**10**	**229**	**227**	94
**8**	**Nashville Predators**	**CE**	**82**	**41**	**32**	**9**	**230**	**229**	91
8.5
9	Edmonton Oilers	NW	82	41	35	6	235	251	88
10	Chicago Blackhawks	CE	82	40	34	8	239	235	88
11	Vancouver Canucks	NW	82	39	33	10	213	215	88
12	Phoenix Coyotes	PA	82	38	37	7	214	231	83
13	Columbus Blue Jackets	CE	82	34	36	12	193	218	80
14	St. Louis Blues	CE	82	33	36	13	205	237	79
15	Los Angeles Kings	PA	82	32	43	7	231	266	71

Divisions: PA – Pacific, CE – Central, NW – Northwest
bold – qualified for playoffs, y – division winner, p – Presidents' Trophy winner

== Schedule and results ==
2007–08 regular season
October: 7–3–1 (home: 4–1–1; road: 3–2–0)

Game	Date	Visitor	Score	Home	OT	Decision	Attendance	Record	Points	Recap
1	October 5	Anaheim	0 – 4	Columbus		Leclaire	17,852	1–0–0	2	W
2	October 6	Columbus	2 – 3	Minnesota		Norrena	18,568	1–1–0	2	L
3	October 10	Phoenix	0 – 3	Columbus		Leclaire	11,944	2–1–0	4	W
4	October 13	Columbus	1 – 5	Colorado		Leclaire	16,153	2–2–0	4	L
5	October 17	Dallas	3 – 2	Columbus	SO	Norrena	11,820	2–2–1	5	OTL
6	October 19	Columbus	3 – 0	Buffalo		Leclaire	18,690	3–2–1	7	W
7	October 21	Vancouver	4 – 1	Columbus		Leclaire	12,667	3–3–1	7	L
8	October 23	Columbus	7 – 4	Chicago		Norrena	10,884	4–3–1	9	W
9	October 25	St. Louis	0 – 3	Columbus		Leclaire	12,786	5–3–1	11	W
10	October 27	San Jose	1 – 2	Columbus		Leclaire	13,234	6–3–1	13	W
11	October 31	Columbus	4 – 1	Los Angeles		Leclaire	11,491	7–3–1	15	W

November: 4–7–3 (home: 3–2–1; road: 1–5–2)

Game	Date	Visitor	Score	Home	OT	Decision	Attendance	Record	Points	Recap
12	November 1	Columbus	1 – 2	Anaheim	SO	Norrena	17,174	7–3–2	16	OTL
13	November 4	St. Louis	0 – 3	Columbus		Leclaire	13,254	8–3–2	18	W
14	November 7	Columbus	2 – 5	Chicago		Norrena	9,717	8–4–2	18	L
15	November 9	Columbus	1 – 4	Detroit		Leclaire	18,654	8–5–2	18	L
16	November 10	Columbus	3 – 4	Nashville	SO	Norrena	15,947	8–5–3	19	OTL
17	November 12	Nashville	4 – 1	Columbus		Leclaire	12,554	8–6–3	19	L
18	November 14	Chicago	2 – 4	Columbus		Leclaire	13,622	9–6–3	21	W
19	November 16	Columbus	2 – 3	St. Louis		Norrena	19,150	9–7–3	21	L
20	November 18	Detroit	5 – 4	Columbus	SO	Leclaire	15,503	9–7–4	22	OTL
21	November 21	Florida	5 – 2	Columbus		Leclaire	13,326	9–8–4	22	L
22	November 23	Columbus	4 – 0	Minnesota		Leclaire	18,568	10–8–4	24	W
23	November 24	Detroit	2 – 3	Columbus	SO	Leclaire	17,513	11–8–4	26	W
24	November 26	Columbus	1 – 3	Edmonton		Norrena	16,839	11–9–4	26	L
25	November 29	Columbus	0 – 2	Vancouver		Norrena	18,630	11–10–4	26	L

December: 7–5–2 (home: 6–3–2; road: 1–2–0)

Game	Date	Visitor	Score	Home	OT	Decision	Attendance	Record	Points	Recap
26	December 1	Columbus	4 – 3	Calgary	OT	Norrena	19,289	12–10–4	28	W
27	December 3	Dallas	2 – 1	Columbus	SO	Leclaire	12,233	12–10–5	29	OTL
28	December 5	Colorado	4 – 5	Columbus		Norrena	12,851	13–10–5	31	W
29	December 8	Minnesota	2 – 1	Columbus		Leclaire	15,666	13–11–5	31	L
30	December 10	Anaheim	4 – 3	Columbus	OT	Leclaire	11,984	13–11–6	32	OTL
31	December 12	Colorado	1 – 4	Columbus		Norrena	13,150	14–11–6	34	W
32	December 15	Columbus	0 – 2	Boston		Norrena	14,058	14–12–6	34	L
33	December 18	Calgary	3 – 0	Columbus		Leclaire	13,181	14–13–6	34	L
34	December 21	Los Angeles	1 – 2	Columbus		Leclaire	14,034	15–13–6	36	W
35	December 23	Nashville	3 – 1	Columbus		Norrena	15,481	15–14–6	36	L
36	December 26	Atlanta	0 – 2	Columbus		Leclaire	15,726	16–14–6	38	W
37	December 27	Columbus	3 – 4	Nashville		Norrena	14,331	16–15–6	38	L
38	December 29	Carolina	1 – 4	Columbus		Leclaire	17,453	17–15–6	40	W
39	December 31	Edmonton	2 – 4	Columbus		Leclaire	16,774	18–15–6	42	W

January: 7–7–0 (home: 3–1–0; road: 4–6–0)

Game	Date	Visitor	Score	Home	OT	Decision	Attendance	Record	Points	Recap
40	January 2	Columbus	1 – 2	Anaheim		Leclaire	17,174	18–16–6	42	L
41	January 3	Columbus	4 – 3	Los Angeles		Norrena	14,173	19–16–6	44	W
42	January 5	Columbus	2 – 3	San Jose		Norrena	17,496	19–17–6	44	L
43	January 8	Columbus	1 – 6	St. Louis		Norrena	14,818	19–18–6	44	L
44	January 11	St. Louis	4 – 6	Columbus		Leclaire	15,233	20–18–6	46	W
45	January 12	Nashville	1 – 2	Columbus	SO	Leclaire	16,230	21–18–6	48	W
46	January 15	Vancouver	2 – 3	Columbus		Leclaire	13,555	22–18–6	50	W
47	January 17	Columbus	4 – 3	Phoenix		Leclaire	11,114	23–18–6	52	W
48	January 19	Columbus	1 – 3	Dallas		Norrena	17,811	23–19–6	52	L
49	January 20	Columbus	1 – 3	Colorado		Leclaire	17,197	23–20–6	52	L
50	January 22	Columbus	4 – 2	Dallas		Leclaire	17,087	24–20–6	54	W
51	January 24	Columbus	1 – 0	Chicago		Leclaire	16,094	25–20–6	56	W
52	January 29	Phoenix	2 – 4	Columbus		Leclaire	15,127	25–21–6	56	L
53	January 31	Columbus	2 – 4	Nashville		Leclaire	13,745	25–22–6	56	L

February: 5–5–3 (home: 0–3–2; road: 5–2–1)

Game	Date	Visitor	Score	Home	OT	Decision	Attendance	Record	Points	Recap
54	February 2	Minnesota	4 – 1	Columbus		Norrena	18,529	25–23–6	56	L
55	February 5	Washington	4 – 3	Columbus	OT	Norrena	14,450	25–23–7	57	OTL
56	February 7	Columbus	2 – 1	Phoenix		Norrena	13,918	26–23–7	59	W
57	February 8	Columbus	1 – 2	San Jose	OT	Norrena	17,210	26–23–8	60	OTL
58	February 10	Los Angeles	3 – 2	Columbus	SO	Leclaire	15,823	26–23–9	61	OTL
59	February 13	Chicago	7 – 2	Columbus		Norrena	14,918	26–24–9	61	L
60	February 15	Columbus	5 – 1	Detroit		Leclaire	20,066	27–24–9	63	W
61	February 17	Columbus	1 – 5	St. Louis		Leclaire	19,150	27–25–9	63	L
62	February 19	Columbus	1 – 3	Toronto		Leclaire	19,347	27–26–9	63	L
63	February 21	Columbus	3 – 2	Ottawa	SO	Leclaire	19,612	28–26–9	65	W
64	February 23	Columbus	3 – 0	Montreal		Leclaire	21,273	29–26–9	67	W
65	February 27	San Jose	4 – 2	Columbus		Leclaire	16,029	29–27–9	67	L
66	February 29	Columbus	3 – 2	Vancouver	OT	Leclaire	18,630	30–27–9	69	W

March: 4–6–3 (home: 4–3–1; road: 0–3–2)

Game	Date	Visitor	Score	Home	OT	Decision	Attendance	Record	Points	Recap
67	March 2	Columbus	3 – 4	Edmonton	SO	Leclaire	16,839	30–27–10	70	OTL
68	March 4	Columbus	0 – 1	Calgary		Leclaire	19,289	30–28–10	70	L
69	March 7	Edmonton	2 – 1	Columbus	OT	Leclaire	14,933	30–28–11	71	OTL
70	March 9	Tampa Bay	3 – 5	Columbus		Leclaire	14,796	31–28–11	73	W
71	March 14	Chicago	6 – 3	Columbus		Norrena	15,699	31–29–11	73	L
72	March 16	Detroit	3 – 4	Columbus		Norrena	18,188	32–29–11	75	W
73	March 18	Calgary	0 – 3	Columbus		Norrena	14,270	33–29–11	77	W
74	March 19	Columbus	1 – 3	Detroit		Norrena	19,061	33–30–11	77	L
75	March 22	Detroit	4 – 1	Columbus		Norrena	17,681	33–31–11	77	L
76	March 25	Columbus	0 – 3	Nashville		Norrena	16,330	33–32–11	77	L
77	March 26	Chicago	0 – 4	Columbus		Norrena	14,454	34–32–11	79	W
78	March 28	Nashville	2 – 0	Columbus		Leclaire	15,595	34–33–11	79	L
79	March 30	Columbus	4 – 5	Chicago	SO	Norrena	20,885	34–33–12	80	OTL

April: 0–3–0 (home: 0–1–0; road: 0–2–0)

Game	Date	Visitor	Score	Home	OT	Decision	Attendance	Record	Points	Recap
80	April 3	Columbus	2 – 3	Detroit		Leclaire	19,435	34–34–12	80	L
81	April 5	Columbus	0 – 3	St. Louis		Leclaire	19,150	34–35–12	80	L
82	April 6	St. Louis	4 – 1	Columbus		Norrena	17,739	34–36–12	80	L

Legend: W Win (2 points) L Loss (0 points) OTL Overtime/shootout loss (1 point)

== Player statistics ==
=== Regular season ===
Scoring

Player	Pos	GP	G	A	Pts	PIM	+/-	PPG	SHG	GWG
Rick Nash	LW	80	38	31	69	95	2	10	4	6
Nikolay Zherdev	W	82	26	35	61	34	-9	7	0	3
Michael Peca	C	65	8	26	34	64	-1	3	0	3
Ron Hainsey	D	78	8	24	32	25	-7	8	0	0
Jason Chimera	LW	81	14	17	31	98	-5	1	1	3
Manny Malhotra	C	71	11	18	29	34	-3	2	0	2
Sergei Fedorov	C	50	9	19	28	30	-3	5	0	1
David Vyborny	RW	66	7	19	26	34	-8	2	0	0
Dan Fritsche	C	69	10	12	22	22	2	1	1	4
Jiri Novotny	C	65	8	14	22	24	-10	1	0	0
Rostislav Klesla	D	82	6	12	18	60	7	3	0	1
Adam Foote	D	63	1	14	15	95	3	0	1	0
Jan Hejda	D	81	0	13	13	61	20	0	0	0
Curtis Glencross	C	36	6	6	12	25	3	1	0	1
Fredrik Modin	LW	23	6	6	12	20	1	2	0	1
Andrew Murray	C	39	6	4	10	12	0	0	0	0
Jared Boll	RW	75	5	5	10	226	-4	0	0	3
Kris Russell	D	67	2	8	10	14	-12	1	0	1
Kris Beech	C	16	5	4	9	2	3	2	0	0
Dick Tarnstrom	D	19	2	7	9	12	-5	1	0	0
Gilbert Brule	C	61	1	8	9	24	-4	0	0	1
Joakim Lindstrom	C	25	3	4	7	14	0	2	0	1
Ole-Kristian Tollefsen	D	51	2	2	4	111	-3	0	1	0
Duvie Westcott	D	23	1	3	4	30	-10	1	0	0
Derek MacKenzie	C	17	2	0	2	8	-2	0	0	0
Derick Brassard	C	17	1	1	2	6	-4	0	0	0
Aaron Rome	D	17	1	1	2	33	-4	0	0	0
Clay Wilson	D	7	1	1	2	2	3	0	0	0
Pascal Leclaire	G	54	0	2	2	2	0	0	0	0
Fredrik Norrena	G	37	0	1	1	0	0	0	0	0
Zenon Konopka	C	3	0	0	0	15	0	0	0	0
Dan LaCosta	G	1	0	0	0	0	0	0	0	0
Marc Methot	D	9	0	0	0	8	-1	0	0	0
Alexandre Picard	LW	3	0	0	0	2	0	0	0	0
Adam Pineault	RW	3	0	0	0	0	-2	0	0	0
Tom Sestito	LW	1	0	0	0	17	0	0	0	0
Jody Shelley	LW	31	0	0	0	44	-2	0	0	0

Goaltending

Player	MIN	GP	W	L	T/OT	GA	GAA	SO	SA	SV	SV%
Pascal Leclaire	2986	54	24	17	6	112	2.25	9	1379	1267	.919
Fredrik Norrena	1960	37	10	19	6	89	2.72	2	856	767	.896
Dan LaCosta	13	1	0	0	0	0	0.00	0	5	5	1.000
Team:	4959	82	34	36	12	201	2.43	11	2240	2039	.910

Note: GP = Games played; G = Goals; A = Assists; Pts = Points; +/- = Plus/minus; PIM = Penalty minutes; PPG=Power-play goals; SHG=Short-handed goals; GWG=Game-winning goals
MIN=Minutes played; W = Wins; L = Losses; T/OT = Ties/Overtime Losses; GA = Goals against; GAA = Goals against average; SO = Shutouts; SA=Shots against; SV=Shots saved; SV% = Save percentage;

== Awards and records ==
=== Milestones ===
Regular season
Player	Milestone	Reached
Jared Boll; Kris Russell	1st NHL Game	October 5, 2007
Kris Russell	1st NHL Assist; 1st NHL Point	October 5, 2007
Fredrik Modin	200th NHL Assist	October 5, 2007
Jared Boll	1st NHL Goal; 1st NHL Point	October 10, 2007
Jason Chimera	300th NHL Game	October 23, 2007
David Vyborny	500th NHL Game; 300th NHL Point	November 24, 2007
Andrew Murray (ice hockey)	1st NHL Game	December 27, 2007
Andrew Murray (ice hockey)	1st NHL Goal; 1st NHL Point	January 2, 2008
Rostislav Klesla	100th NHL Point	January 17, 2008
Kris Russell	1st NHL Goal	January 22, 2008

== Transactions ==
The Blue Jackets have been involved in the following transactions during the 2007–08 season.

=== Trades ===
November 15, 2007	To Columbus Blue Jackets Aaron Rome; Clay Wilson	To Anaheim Ducks Geoff Platt
January 22, 2008	To Columbus Blue Jackets Mark Rycroft	To Colorado Avalanche Darcy Campbell; Philippe Dupuis
January 29, 2008	To Columbus Blue Jackets 6th-round pick in 2009 – David Pacan	To San Jose Sharks Jody Shelley
February 1, 2008	To Columbus Blue Jackets Dick Tarnstrom	To Edmonton Oilers Curtis Glencross
February 26, 2008	To Columbus Blue Jackets Conditional 1st-round pick in 2008 or 2009 – Luca Sbisa; Conditional 4th-round pick in 2009 – David Savard	To Colorado Avalanche Adam Foote
February 26, 2008	To Columbus Blue Jackets Ted Ruth	To Washington Capitals Sergei Fedorov

=== Free agents ===
Player	Former team	Contract terms
Sheldon Brookbank	Nashville Predators	1 year, $500,000
Jiri Novotny	Washington Capitals	2 years, $1.5 million
Jan Hejda	Edmonton Oilers	1 year, $1 million
Derek MacKenzie	Atlanta Thrashers	1 year, $475,000
Kris Beech	Washington Capitals	1 year, $585,000
Michael Peca	Toronto Maple Leafs	1 year, $1.3 million plus incentives

Player	New team
Anders Eriksson	Calgary Flames
Aaron Johnson	New York Islanders

== Draft picks ==
Columbus' picks at the 2007 NHL entry draft in Columbus, Ohio. The Blue Jackets picked 7th overall in front of their hometown crowd.

Round	#	Player	Position	Nationality	College/Junior/Club team (League)
1	7	Jakub Voracek	RW	Czech Republic	Halifax Mooseheads (QMJHL)
2	37	Stefan Legein	RW	Canada	Mississauga IceDogs (OHL)
2	53	Will Weber	D	United States	Gaylord High School (USHS-MI)
3	68	Jake Hansen	W	United States	Sioux Falls Stampede (USHL)
4	94	Maxim Mayorov	W	Russia	Neftyanik Leninogorsk (Russia-2)
6	158	Allen York	G	Canada	Camrose Kodiaks (AJHL)
7	211	Trent Vogelhuber	RW	United States	St. Louis Bandits (NAHL)

== Farm teams ==
=== American Hockey League ===
Syracuse Crunch

=== ECHL ===
Elmira Jackals - It was announced on October 4 that the Elmira Jackals will take over as the ECHL affiliate to the Blue Jackets, replacing the Dayton Bombers.

== See also ==
- 2007–08 NHL season
