= 2007–08 Los Angeles Kings season =

National Hockey League team season

2007–08 Los Angeles Kings
- Division: 5th Pacific
- Conference: 15th Western
- 2007–08 record: 32–43–7
- Home record: 17–21–3
- Road record: 15–22–4
- Goals for: 231
- Goals against: 266

Team information
- General manager: Dean Lombardi
- Coach: Marc Crawford
- Captain: Rob Blake
- Alternate captains: Michael Cammalleri; Scott Thornton; Lubomir Visnovsky
- Arena: Staples Center
- Average attendance: 16,583 (91.5%)* (Does not include home game played in London, England)

Team leaders
- Goals: Dustin Brown (32)
- Assists: Anze Kopitar (44)
- Points: Anze Kopitar (74)
- Penalty minutes: Raitis Ivanans (134)
- Plus/minus: Alexander Frolov (4)
- Wins: Jason LaBarbera (17)
- Goals against average: Erik Ersberg (2.52)

The 2007–08 Los Angeles Kings season was the 41st season (40th season of play) for the National Hockey League (NHL) franchise. Their season began with the team playing a neutral site home-and-home series with the defending Stanley Cup champion Anaheim Ducks at the O2 Arena in London, England, the first time the NHL has held a regular season game in Europe.

Along with the switch to the Rbk Edge uniforms instituted league-wide for 2007–08, the Kings also changed their goal celebration horn at Staples Center from a foghorn to a train horn.

== Regular season ==
The Kings were officially eliminated from playoff contention in early March for the fifth consecutive season.

The Kings struggled on the penalty kill, finishing 30th overall in penalty-kill percentage (77.99%).

=== Divisional standings ===
Pacific Division
		GP	W	L	OTL	GF	GA	Pts
**1**	**y – San Jose Sharks**	**82**	**49**	**23**	**10**	**222**	**193**	**108**
**2**	**Anaheim Ducks**	**82**	**47**	**27**	**8**	**205**	**191**	**102**
**3**	**Dallas Stars**	**82**	**45**	**30**	**7**	**242**	**207**	**97**
4	Phoenix Coyotes	82	38	37	7	214	231	83
5	Los Angeles Kings	82	32	43	7	231	266	71

=== Conference standings ===
Western Conference
R		Div	GP	W	L	OTL	GF	GA	Pts
**1**	**p – Detroit Red Wings**	**CE**	**82**	**54**	**21**	**7**	**257**	**184**	115
**2**	**y – San Jose Sharks**	**PA**	**82**	**49**	**23**	**10**	**222**	**193**	108
**3**	**y – Minnesota Wild**	**NW**	**82**	**44**	**28**	**10**	**223**	**218**	98
**4**	**Anaheim Ducks**	**PA**	**82**	**47**	**27**	**8**	**205**	**191**	102
**5**	**Dallas Stars**	**PA**	**82**	**45**	**30**	**7**	**242**	**207**	97
**6**	**Colorado Avalanche**	**NW**	**82**	**44**	**31**	**7**	**231**	**219**	95
**7**	**Calgary Flames**	**NW**	**82**	**42**	**30**	**10**	**229**	**227**	94
**8**	**Nashville Predators**	**CE**	**82**	**41**	**32**	**9**	**230**	**229**	91
8.5
9	Edmonton Oilers	NW	82	41	35	6	235	251	88
10	Chicago Blackhawks	CE	82	40	34	8	239	235	88
11	Vancouver Canucks	NW	82	39	33	10	213	215	88
12	Phoenix Coyotes	PA	82	38	37	7	214	231	83
13	Columbus Blue Jackets	CE	82	34	36	12	193	218	80
14	St. Louis Blues	CE	82	33	36	13	205	237	79
15	Los Angeles Kings	PA	82	32	43	7	231	266	71

Divisions: PA – Pacific, CE – Central, NW – Northwest
bold – qualified for playoffs, y – division winner, p – Presidents' Trophy winner

== Schedule and results ==
2007–08 regular season
September: 1–1–0 (home: 1–0–0; road: 0–1–0)

Game	Date	Visitor	Score	Home	OT	Decision	Attendance	Record	Points	Recap
1	September 29*	Anaheim	1 – 4	Los Angeles		Bernier	17,551	1–0–0	2	W
2	September 30*	Los Angeles	1 – 4	Anaheim		LaBarbera	17,551	1–1–0	2	L
Notes: *At O2 Arena in London, England.

October: 6–7–0 (home: 5–4–0; road: 1–3–0)

Game	Date	Visitor	Score	Home	OT	Decision	Attendance	Record	Points	Recap
3	October 6	St. Louis	5 – 3	Los Angeles		Bernier	18,118	1–2–0	2	L
4	October 10	Los Angeles	1 – 5	Dallas		LaBarbera	16,129	1–3–0	2	L
5	October 12	Boston	8 – 6	Los Angeles		Bernier	17,064	1–4–0	2	L
6	October 14	Detroit	4 – 1	Los Angeles		Bernier	17,215	1–5–0	2	L
7	October 16	Minnesota	3 – 4	Los Angeles	SO	Aubin	14,239	2–5–0	4	W
8	October 18	Los Angeles	3 – 4	Calgary		Aubin	19,289	2–6–0	4	L
9	October 19	Los Angeles	4 – 2	Vancouver		LaBarbera	18,630	3–6–0	6	W
10	October 23	Nashville	0 – 6	Los Angeles		LaBarbera	14,026	4–6–0	8	W
11	October 25	Dallas	1 – 2	Los Angeles		LaBarbera	14,559	5–6–0	10	W
12	October 27	Edmonton	1 – 4	Los Angeles		LaBarbera	16,173	6–6–0	12	W
13	October 31	Columbus	4 – 1	Los Angeles		LaBarbera	11,491	6–7–0	12	L

November: 2–5–1 (home: 1–3–0; road: 1–2–1)

Game	Date	Visitor	Score	Home	OT	Decision	Attendance	Record	Points	Recap
14	November 2	Los Angeles	5 – 2	San Jose		Aubin	17,496	7–7–0	14	W
15	November 3	San Jose	3 – 1	Los Angeles		LaBarbera	18,118	7–8–0	14	L
16	November 10	Dallas	5 – 6	Los Angeles	OT	Aubin	18,118	8–8–0	16	W
17	November 13	Los Angeles	3 – 4	Anaheim	SO	LaBarbera	17,174	8–8–1	17	OTL
18	November 15	Anaheim	6 – 3	Los Angeles		Aubin	18,118	8–9–1	17	L
19	November 17	Phoenix	1 – 0	Los Angeles		LaBarbera	15,659	8–10–1	17	L
20	November 19	Los Angeles	0 – 3	Dallas		LaBarbera	17,208	8–11–1	17	L
21	November 21	Los Angeles	1 – 4	Phoenix		LaBarbera	12,161	8–12–1	17	L
22	November 24	Los Angeles	2 – 1	San Jose		LaBarbera	17,496	9–12–1	19	W
23	November 25	Los Angeles	2 – 3	Anaheim		LaBarbera	17,174	9–13–1	19	L
24	November 28	Los Angeles	3 – 2	San Jose	SO	LaBarbera	17,071	10–13–1	21	W

December: 2–11–1 (home: 2–5–1; road: 0–6–0)

Game	Date	Visitor	Score	Home	OT	Decision	Attendance	Record	Points	Recap
25	December 1	Colorado	5 – 2	Los Angeles		LaBarbera	17,297	10–14–1	21	L
26	December 3	Edmonton	4 – 3	Los Angeles	SO	Aubin	14,193	10–14–2	22	OTL
27	December 5	Los Angeles	1 – 4	Phoenix		Aubin	11,401	10–15–2	22	L
28	December 6	Buffalo	2 – 8	Los Angeles		Quick	15,980	11–15–2	24	W
29	December 8	Phoenix	4 – 2	Los Angeles		Aubin	16,053	11–16–2	24	L
30	December 10	Vancouver	2 – 4	Los Angeles		Aubin	15,087	12–16–2	26	W
31	December 12	Los Angeles	3 – 6	Chicago		Quick	12,534	12–17–2	26	L
32	December 13	Los Angeles	1 – 4	Dallas		Quick	17,913	12–18–2	26	L
33	December 15	Minnesota	2 – 1	Los Angeles		Aubin	16,648	12–19–2	26	L
34	December 17	Colorado	4 – 2	Los Angeles		LaBarbera	16,647	12–20–2	26	L
35	December 19	Los Angeles	2 – 6	Detroit		LaBarbera	19,516	12–21–2	26	L
36	December 21	Los Angeles	1 – 2	Columbus		LaBarbera	14,034	12–22–2	26	L
37	December 22	Los Angeles	3 – 4	Nashville		LaBarbera	15,698	12–23–2	26	L
38	December 26	San Jose	3 – 2	Los Angeles		LaBarbera	18,118	12–24–2	26	L
39	December 29	Los Angeles	3 – 1	Colorado		Aubin	17,256	13–24–2	28	W
40	December 30	Los Angeles	3 – 2	Chicago	OT	LaBarbera	21,715	14–24–2	30	W

January: 6–5–0 (home: 4–4–0; road: 2–1–0)

Game	Date	Visitor	Score	Home	OT	Decision	Attendance	Record	Points	Recap
41	January 1	Chicago	2 – 9	Los Angeles		LaBarbera	16,916	15–24–2	32	W
42	January 3	Columbus	4 – 3	Los Angeles		LaBarbera	14,173	15–25–2	32	L
43	January 5	Calgary	6 – 4	Los Angeles		LaBarbera	18,118	15–26–2	32	L
44	January 8	Nashville	7 – 0	Los Angeles		LaBarbera	14,751	15–27–2	32	L
45	January 10	Toronto	2 – 5	Los Angeles		LaBarbera	18,118	16–27–2	34	W
46	January 12	Dallas	3 – 4	Los Angeles	SO	LaBarbera	16,916	17–27–2	36	W
47	January 15	Los Angeles	3 – 1	Edmonton		LaBarbera	16,839	18–27–2	38	W
48	January 18	Los Angeles	1 – 6	Calgary		LaBarbera	19,289	18–28–2	38	L
49	January 19	Los Angeles	4 – 3	Vancouver		LaBarbera	18,630	19–28–2	40	W
50	January 22	Detroit	3 – 0	Los Angeles		LaBarbera	18,118	19–29–2	40	L
51	January 24	Anaheim	1 – 3	Los Angeles		LaBarbera	18,118	20–29–2	42	W
52	January 29	Los Angeles	2 – 3	Philadelphia	OT	LaBarbera	19,127	20–29–3	43	OTL
53	January 31	Los Angeles	3 – 1	NY Islanders		LaBarbera	10,148	21–29–3	45	W

February: 5–6–1 (home: 2–1–1; road: 3–5–0)

Game	Date	Visitor	Score	Home	OT	Decision	Attendance	Record	Points	Recap
54	February 2	Los Angeles	3 – 6	New Jersey		LaBarbera	15,279	21–30–3	45	L
55	February 5	Los Angeles	4 – 2	N.Y. Rangers		LaBarbera	18,200	22–30–3	47	W
56	February 7	Los Angeles	5 – 3	Detroit		LaBarbera	18,852	23–30–3	49	W
57	February 9	Los Angeles	2 – 4	Pittsburgh		Labarbera	17,034	23–31–3	49	L
58	February 10	Los Angeles	3 – 2	Columbus	SO	Cloutier	15,832	24–31–3	51	W
59	February 12	Los Angeles	2 – 4	St. Louis		LaBarbera	15,688	24–32–3	51	L
60	February 15	Calgary	3 – 6	Los Angeles		LaBarbera	18,118	25–32–3	53	W
61	February 16	Los Angeles	3 – 4	Phoenix		LaBarbera	17,997	25–33–3	53	L
62	February 18	Phoenix	4 – 0	Los Angeles		LaBarbera	16,617	25–34–3	53	L
63	February 21	St. Louis	1 – 5	Los Angeles		Cloutier	14,132	26–34–3	55	W
64	February 23	Chicago	6 – 5	Los Angeles	OT	Ersberg	18,118	26–34–4	56	OTL
65	February 28	Los Angeles	4 – 5	Edmonton		Cloutier	16,839	26–35–4	56	L

March: 5–6–3 (home: 2–3–1; road: 3–3–2)

Game	Date	Visitor	Score	Home	OT	Decision	Attendance	Record	Points	Recap
66	March 1	Los Angeles	2 – 5	Colorado		Cloutier	18,007	26–36–4	56	L
67	March 2	Los Angeles	1 – 2	Minnesota	OT	Ersberg	18,568	26–36–5	57	OTL
68	March 4	Los Angeles	2 – 3	St. Louis		Ersberg	14,973	26–37–5	57	L
69	March 6	Ottawa	0 – 2	Los Angeles		Ersberg	17,580	27–37–5	59	W
70	March 8	Montreal	5 – 2	Los Angeles		Ersberg	18,118	27–38–5	59	L
71	March 10	Vancouver	2 – 1	Los Angeles	OT	Cloutier	14,653	27–38–6	60	OTL
72	March 13	Los Angeles	4 – 1	Nashville		Ersberg	15,853	28–38–6	62	W
73	March 15	Los Angeles	0 – 2	Minnesota		Ersberg	18,568	28–39–6	62	L
74	March 18	San Jose	2 – 1	Los Angeles		Cloutier	16,784	28–40–6	62	L
75	March 20	Los Angeles	6 – 5	Phoenix	SO	Ersberg	14,852	29–40–6	64	W
76	March 22	Los Angeles	4 – 2	Dallas		Ersberg	18,532	30–40–6	66	W
77	March 26	Los Angeles	1 – 2	Anaheim	SO	Ersberg	17,331	30–40–7	67	OTL
78	March 27	Phoenix	0 – 4	Los Angeles		Ersberg	17,331	31–40–7	69	W
79	March 29	Dallas	7 – 2	Los Angeles		Ersberg	17,849	31–41–7	69	L

April: 1–2–0 (home: 1–1–0; road: 0–1–0)

Game	Date	Visitor	Score	Home	OT	Decision	Attendance	Record	Points	Recap
80	April 1	Los Angeles	2 – 5	San Jose		Ersberg	17,496	31–42–7	69	L
81	April 3	San Jose	2 – 4	Los Angeles		Ersberg	17,759	32–42–7	71	W
82	April 5	Anaheim	3 – 4	Los Angeles		Cloutier	18,118	32–43–7	71	L

Legend: W Win (2 points) L Loss (0 points) OTL Overtime/shootout loss (1 point)

== Player statistics ==
=== Skaters ===
Note: GP = Games played; G = Goals; A = Assists; Pts = Points; PIM = Penalty minutes

	Regular season					Playoffs
Player	GP	G	A	Pts	PIM	GP	G	A	Pts	PIM
Alexander Frolov	21	4	16	20	10
Michael Cammalleri	21	12	7	19	6
Anze Kopitar	21	8	10	18	4
Dustin Brown	21	8	5	13	13
Lubomir Visnovsky	21	1	12	13	12
Ladislav Nagy	19	4	7	11	8
Derek Armstrong	21	0	9	9	14
Patrick O'Sullivan	21	4	3	7	4
Kyle Calder	13	3	3	6	4
Brad Stuart	21	2	4	6	10

=== Goaltenders ===
Note: GP = Games played; Min = Minutes played; W = Wins; L = Losses; OT = Overtime/shootout losses; GA = Goals against; SO = Shutouts; SV% = Save percentage; GAA = Goals against average

	Regular season									Playoffs
Player	GP	Min	W	L	OT	GA	SO	SV%	GAA	GP	Min	W	L	GA	SO	SV%	GAA
Jason LaBarbera	45	2421	17	23	2	121	2	.910	3.00
Jean-Sebastien Aubin	19	827	5	6	1	44	0	.866	3.19
Erik Ersberg	14
Dan Cloutier	9	489	2	4	1	15	0	.887	3.44
Jonathan Bernier	4	238	1	3	0	16	0	.864	4.03
Jonathan Quick	3
Daniel Taylor	1	20	0	0	0	2	0	.800	6.00

== Transactions ==
The Kings have been involved in the following transactions during the 2007–08 season:

=== Trades ===
February 19, 2008	To Philadelphia Flyers Jaroslav Modry	To Los Angeles Kings 3rd-round pick in 2008 – Geordie Wudrick
February 26, 2008	To Detroit Red Wings Brad Stuart	To Los Angeles Kings 2nd-round pick in 2008 – Peter Delmas; 4th-round pick in 2009 – Ben Chiarot
February 26, 2008	To Anaheim Ducks Jean-Sebastien Aubin	To Los Angeles Kings 7th-round pick in 2008 – Paul Karpowich

=== Free agents ===
Player	Former team	Contract terms
Michal Handzus	Chicago Blackhawks	4 years, $16 million
Tom Preissing	Ottawa Senators	4 years, $11 million
Kyle Calder	Detroit Red Wings	2 years, $5.4 million
Ladislav Nagy	Dallas Stars	1 year, $3.75 million
Brad Stuart	Calgary Flames	1 year, $3.5 million
Jean-Sebastien Aubin	Toronto Maple Leafs	1 year, $525.000

Player	New team
Mathieu Garon	Edmonton Oilers
Tom Kostopoulos	Montreal Canadiens
Tim Jackman	New York Islanders
Aaron Miller	Vancouver Canucks
Ryan Flinn	Edmonton Oilers
Noah Clarke	New Jersey Devils

== Draft picks ==
Los Angeles' picks at the 2007 NHL entry draft in Columbus, Ohio. The Kings had the 4th overall selection.

Round	#	Player	Nationality	NHL team	College/Junior/Club team (league)
1	4	Thomas Hickey (D)	Canada	Los Angeles Kings	Seattle Thunderbirds (WHL)
2	52	Oscar Moller (C)	Sweden	Los Angeles Kings	Chilliwack Bruins (WHL)
2	61	Wayne Simmonds (RW)	Canada	Los Angeles Kings	Owen Sound Attack (OHL)
3	82	Bryan Cameron (C)	Canada	Los Angeles Kings	Belleville Bulls (OHL)
4	95	Alec Martinez (D)	United States	Los Angeles Kings	Miami University (CCHA)
4	109	Dwight King (C)	Canada	Los Angeles Kings	Lethbridge Hurricanes (WHL)
5	124	Linden Rowat (G)	Canada	Los Angeles Kings	Regina Pats (WHL)
5	137	Joshua Turnbull (C)	United States	Los Angeles Kings	Waterloo Black Hawks (USHL)
7	184	Josh Kidd (D)	Canada	Los Angeles Kings	Erie Otters (OHL)
7	188	Matt Fillier (LW)	Canada	Los Angeles Kings	St. John's Fog Devils (QMJHL)

== Farm teams ==
=== Manchester Monarchs ===
The Manchester Monarchs are the Kings American Hockey League (AHL) affiliate in 2007–08.

=== Reading Royals ===
The Reading Royals are the Kings affiliate in the ECHL.

== See also ==
- 2007–08 NHL season
