= 2007–08 Vancouver Canucks season =

NHL hockey team season

2007–08 Vancouver Canucks
- Division: 5th Northwest
- Conference: 11th Western
- 2007–08 record: 39–33–10
- Home record: 21–15–5
- Road record: 18–18–5
- Goals for: 213
- Goals against: 215

Team information
- General manager: Dave Nonis
- Coach: Alain Vigneault
- Captain: Markus Naslund
- Alternate captains: Trevor Linden; Brendan Morrison
- Arena: General Motors Place
- Average attendance: 18,630 (100%)

Team leaders
- Goals: Daniel Sedin (29)
- Assists: Henrik Sedin (61)
- Points: Henrik Sedin (76)
- Penalty minutes: Alexandre Burrows (179)
- Plus/minus: Alexandre Burrows (+11)
- Wins: Roberto Luongo (35)
- Goals against average: Roberto Luongo (2.38)

The 2007–08 Vancouver Canucks season was the Canucks' 38th season in the National Hockey League (NHL). For the second time in three years, the Canucks failed to qualify for the playoffs.

== Standings ==
=== Divisional standings ===
Northwest Division
		GP	W	L	OTL	GF	GA	Pts
**1**	**y – Minnesota Wild**	**82**	**44**	**28**	**10**	**223**	**218**	**98**
**2**	**Colorado Avalanche**	**82**	**44**	**31**	**7**	**231**	**219**	**95**
**3**	**Calgary Flames**	**82**	**42**	**30**	**10**	**229**	**227**	**94**
4	Edmonton Oilers	82	41	35	6	235	251	88
5	Vancouver Canucks	82	39	33	10	213	215	88

=== Conference standings ===
Western Conference
R		Div	GP	W	L	OTL	GF	GA	Pts
**1**	**p – Detroit Red Wings**	**CE**	**82**	**54**	**21**	**7**	**257**	**184**	115
**2**	**y – San Jose Sharks**	**PA**	**82**	**49**	**23**	**10**	**222**	**193**	108
**3**	**y – Minnesota Wild**	**NW**	**82**	**44**	**28**	**10**	**223**	**218**	98
**4**	**Anaheim Ducks**	**PA**	**82**	**47**	**27**	**8**	**205**	**191**	102
**5**	**Dallas Stars**	**PA**	**82**	**45**	**30**	**7**	**242**	**207**	97
**6**	**Colorado Avalanche**	**NW**	**82**	**44**	**31**	**7**	**231**	**219**	95
**7**	**Calgary Flames**	**NW**	**82**	**42**	**30**	**10**	**229**	**227**	94
**8**	**Nashville Predators**	**CE**	**82**	**41**	**32**	**9**	**230**	**229**	91
8.5
9	Edmonton Oilers	NW	82	41	35	6	235	251	88
10	Chicago Blackhawks	CE	82	40	34	8	239	235	88
11	Vancouver Canucks	NW	82	39	33	10	213	215	88
12	Phoenix Coyotes	PA	82	38	37	7	214	231	83
13	Columbus Blue Jackets	CE	82	34	36	12	193	218	80
14	St. Louis Blues	CE	82	33	36	13	205	237	79
15	Los Angeles Kings	PA	82	32	43	7	231	266	71

Divisions: PA – Pacific, CE – Central, NW – Northwest
bold – qualified for playoffs, y – division winner, p – Presidents' Trophy winner

== Schedule and results ==
2007–08 regular season
October: 5–7–0 (home: 1–5–0; road: 4–2–0)

Game	Date	Visitor	Score	Home	OT	Decision	Attendance	Record	Points	Recap
1	October 5	San Jose	3–1	Vancouver		Luongo	18,630	0–1–0	0	L
2	October 6	Vancouver	4–3	Calgary	OT	Luongo	19,289	1–1–0	2	W
3	October 10	Philadelphia	8–2	Vancouver		Luongo	18,630	1–2–0	2	L
4	October 12	Vancouver	5–2	Edmonton		Luongo	16,839	2–2–0	4	W
5	October 13	Edmonton	1–4	Vancouver		Luongo	18,630	3–2–0	6	W
6	October 15	San Jose	4–2	Vancouver		Luongo	18,630	3–3–0	6	L
7	October 19	Los Angeles	4–2	Vancouver		Luongo	18,630	3–4–0	6	L
8	October 21	Vancouver	4–1	Columbus		Sanford	12,667	4–4–0	8	W
9	October 22	Vancouver	1–3	Carolina		Luongo	15,532	4–5–0	8	L
10	October 24	Vancouver	2–3	Detroit		Luongo	17,015	4–6–0	8	L
11	October 26	Vancouver	3–2	Washington		Luongo	12,705	5–6–0	10	W
12	October 28	Detroit	3–2	Vancouver		Luongo	18,630	5–7–0	10	L

November: 9–2–2 (home: 6–1–1; road: 3–1–1)

Game	Date	Visitor	Score	Home	OT	Decision	Attendance	Record	Points	Recap
13	November 1	Nashville	3–0	Vancouver		Luongo	18,630	5–8–0	10	L
14	November 3	Vancouver	4–3	Colorado		Luongo	18,007	6–8–0	12	W
15	November 8	Vancouver	3–2	Calgary		Luongo	19,289	7–8–0	14	W
16	November 9	Colorado	1–2	Vancouver	OT	Luongo	18,630	8–8–0	16	W
17	November 14	Edmonton	1–0	Vancouver	SO	Luongo	18,630	8–8–1	17	OTL
18	November 16	Minnesota	2–6	Vancouver		Luongo	18,630	9–8–1	19	W
19	November 18	Calgary	1–4	Vancouver		Luongo	18,630	10–8–1	21	W
20	November 20	Vancouver	4–5	Edmonton	SO	Luongo	16,839	10–8–2	22	OTL
21	November 21	Vancouver	4–2	Minnesota		Sanford	18,568	11–8–2	24	W
22	November 23	Vancouver	1–3	St. Louis		Luongo	18,721	11–9–2	24	L
23	November 25	Chicago	0–2	Vancouver		Luongo	18,630	12–9–2	26	W
24	November 27	Anaheim	0–4	Vancouver		Luongo	18,630	13–9–2	28	W
25	November 29	Columbus	0–2	Vancouver		Luongo	18,630	14–9–2	30	W

December: 7–5–2 (home: 3–0–1; road: 4–5–1)

Game	Date	Visitor	Score	Home	OT	Decision	Attendance	Record	Points	Recap
26	December 2	Vancouver	1–2	Minnesota		Luongo	18,568	14–10–2	30	L
27	December 5	Vancouver	3–2	Chicago		Luongo	12,444	15–10–2	32	W
28	December 6	Vancouver	5–2	Nashville		Sanford	15,918	16–10–2	34	W
29	December 8	Pittsburgh	2–1	Vancouver	SO	Luongo	18,630	16–10–3	35	OTL
30	December 10	Vancouver	2–4	Los Angeles		Sanford	15,087	16–11–3	35	L
31	December 12	Vancouver	3–2	Anaheim		Sanford	17,174	17–11–3	37	W
32	December 13	Vancouver	2–5	San Jose		Sanford	17,496	17–12–3	37	L
33	December 15	Vancouver	1–2	Edmonton	SO	Sanford	16,839	17–12–4	38	OTL
34	December 18	New Jersey	0–5	Vancouver		Luongo	18,630	18–12–4	40	W
35	December 20	Dallas	2–3	Vancouver		Luongo	18,630	19–12–4	42	W
36	December 22	Vancouver	2–1	Phoenix	SO	Luongo	17,471	20–12–4	44	W
37	December 23	Vancouver	1–3	Colorado		Luongo	17,186	20–13–4	44	L
38	December 27	Calgary	3–5	Vancouver		Luongo	18,630	21–13–4	46	W
39	December 30	Anaheim	1–2	Vancouver		Luongo	18,630	22–13–4	48	W
40	December 31	Vancouver	1–2	Calgary		Luongo	19,289	22–14–4	48	L

January: 4–7–1 (home: 3–4–0; road: 1–3–1)

Game	Date	Visitor	Score	Home	OT	Decision	Attendance	Record	Points	Recap
41	January 3	NY Rangers	0–3	Vancouver		Luongo	18,630	23–14–4	50	W
42	January 8	NY Islanders	2–3	Vancouver	SO	Luongo	18,630	24–14–4	52	W
43	January 10	Vancouver	1–3	San Jose		Luongo	17,496	24–15–4	52	L
44	January 11	Phoenix	4–3	Vancouver		Sanford	18,630	24–16–4	52	L
45	January 13	Vancouver	4–3	St. Louis	SO	Luongo	16,828	25–16–4	54	W
46	January 15	Vancouver	2–3	Columbus		Luongo	13,555	25–17–4	54	L
47	January 17	Vancouver	2–3	Detroit	SO	Luongo	18,878	25–17–5	55	OTL
48	January 19	Los Angeles	4–3	Vancouver		Luongo	18,630	25–18–5	55	L
49	January 21	Minnesota	4–2	Vancouver		Luongo	18,630	25–19–5	55	L
50	January 23	St. Louis	2–3	Vancouver	SO	Luongo	18,630	26–19–5	57	W
51	January 29	Dallas	4–3	Vancouver		MacIntyre	18,630	26–20–5	57	L
52	January 31	Vancouver	3–4	Tampa Bay		Luongo	17,019	26–21–5	57	L

February: 6–1–5 (home: 3–1–3; road: 3–0–2)

Game	Date	Visitor	Score	Home	OT	Decision	Attendance	Record	Points	Recap
53	February 1	Vancouver	3–4	Florida	SO	Luongo	17,523	26–21–6	58	OTL
54	February 5	Vancouver	2–3	Dallas	SO	Luongo	17,642	26–21–7	59	OTL
55	February 7	Vancouver	2–1	Atlanta		Luongo	16,813	27–21–7	61	W
56	February 9	Colorado	6–2	Vancouver		Luongo	18,630	27–22–7	61	L
57	February 10	Chicago	2–3	Vancouver	SO	Luongo	18,630	28–22–7	63	W
58	February 14	Minnesota	5–4	Vancouver	SO	Luongo	18,630	28–22–8	64	OTL
59	February 16	Edmonton	2–4	Vancouver		Luongo	18,630	29–22–8	66	W
60	February 19	Vancouver	3–2	Minnesota	OT	Luongo	18,568	30–22–8	68	W
61	February 21	Vancouver	3–2	Nashville	SO	Luongo	17,113	31–22–8	70	W
62	February 23	Detroit	1–4	Vancouver		Luongo	18,630	32–22–8	72	W
63	February 27	Colorado	3–2	Vancouver	SO	Luongo	18,630	32–22–9	73	OTL
64	February 29	Columbus	3–2	Vancouver	OT	Luongo	18,630	32–22–10	74	OTL

March: 7–8–0 (home: 4–1–0; road: 3–7–0)

Game	Date	Visitor	Score	Home	OT	Decision	Attendance	Record	Points	Recap
65	March 2	Vancouver	1–4	Chicago		Luongo	19,670	32–23–10	74	L
66	March 4	Vancouver	1–2	Colorado		Luongo	17,621	32–24–10	74	L
67	March 6	Nashville	2–6	Vancouver		Luongo	18,630	33–24–10	76	W
68	March 8	St. Louis	2–4	Vancouver		Luongo	18,630	34–24–10	78	W
69	March 10	Vancouver	2–1	Los Angeles	OT	Luongo	14,653	35–24–10	80	W
70	March 12	Vancouver	1–4	Anaheim		Luongo	17,174	35–25–10	80	L
71	March 13	Vancouver	0–2	Phoenix		Luongo	15,562	35–26–10	80	L
72	March 15	Vancouver	4–3	Dallas		Luongo	18,584	36–26–10	82	W
73	March 17	Phoenix	1–3	Vancouver		Luongo	18,630	37–26–10	84	W
74	March 20	Vancouver	4–1	Edmonton		Luongo	16,839	38–26–10	86	W
75	March 21	Minnesota	2–1	Vancouver		Luongo	18,630	38–27–10	86	L
76	March 25	Vancouver	2–3	Calgary		Luongo	19,025	38–28–10	86	L
77	March 26	Vancouver	3–6	Colorado		Luongo	18,050	38–29–10	86	L
78	March 28	Vancouver	0–4	Minnesota		Luongo	18,064	38–30–10	86	L
79	March 30	Calgary	2–6	Vancouver		Luongo	18,630	39–30–10	88	W

April: 0–3–0 (home: 0–3–0; road: 0–0–0)

Game	Date	Visitor	Score	Home	OT	Decision	Attendance	Record	Points	Recap
80	April 1	Colorado	4–2	Vancouver		Luongo	18,630	39–31–10	88	L
81	April 3	Edmonton	2–1	Vancouver		Luongo	18,630	39–32–10	88	L
82	April 5	Calgary	7–1	Vancouver		Luongo	18,630	39–33–10	88	L

Legend: W Win (2 points) L Loss (0 points) OTL Overtime/shootout loss (1 point)

== Player statistics ==
=== Skaters ===
Note: GP = Games played; G = Goals; A = Assists; Pts = Points; +/- = Plus–minus; PIM = Penalty minutes

Regular season

Player	GP	G	A	Pts	+/-	PIM
Henrik Sedin	82	15	61	76	+6	56
Daniel Sedin	82	29	45	74	+6	50
Markus Naslund	82	25	30	55	-7	46
Ryan Kesler	80	21	16	37	+1	79
Taylor Pyatt	79	16	21	37	+9	60
Alexandre Burrows	82	12	19	31	+11	179
Brendan Morrison	39	9	16	25	-3	18
Sami Salo	63	8	17	25	+8	38
Mattias Ohlund	53	9	15	24	-1	79
Mason Raymond	49	9	12	21	+1	2
Alexander Edler	75	8	12	20	+6	42
Matt Cooke^{‡}	61	7	9	16	-4	64
Ryan Shannon	27	5	8	13	-1	24
Trevor Linden	59	7	5	12	0	15
Kevin Bieksa	34	2	10	12	-11	90
Willie Mitchell	72	2	10	12	+6	81
Brad Isbister	55	6	5	11	-4	38
Byron Ritchie	71	3	8	11	-10	80
Lukas Krajicek	39	2	9	11	-3	36
Aaron Miller	57	1	8	9	-1	32
Matt Pettinger^{†}	20	4	2	6	0	11
Jason Jaffray	19	2	4	6	+4	19
Rick Rypien	22	1	2	3	-5	41
Luc Bourdon	27	2	0	2	+7	20
Kris Beech^{†‡}	4	1	1	2	+1	0
Mike Brown	19	1	0	1	-2	55
Jeff Cowan	46	0	1	1	-5	110
Mike Weaver	55	0	1	1	+1	33
Zack Fitzgerald	1	0	0	0	0	0
Jannik Hansen	5	0	0	0	0	2
Nathan McIver	17	0	0	0	-8	52

=== Goaltenders ===
Note: GP = Games played; TOI = Time on ice; W = Wins; L = Losses; OT = Overtime/shootout losses; GA = Goals against; SO = Shutouts; SV% = Save percentage; GAA = Goals against average; G = Goals; A = Assists; PIM = Penalty minutes

Regular season

Player	GP	TOI	W	L	OT	GA	GAA	SA	SV	Sv%	SO	G	A	PIM
Roberto Luongo	73	4233	35	29	9	168	2.38	2029	1861	.917	6	0	3	4
Curtis Sanford	16	679	4	3	1	32	2.83	313	281	.898	0	0	1	2
Drew MacIntyre	2	61	0	1	0	3	2.95	22	19	.864	0	0	0	0

^{†}Denotes player spent time with another team before joining Vancouver. Stats reflect time with the Canucks only.
^{‡}Denotes player no longer with the team. Stats reflect time with Canucks only.

== Awards and records ==
=== 2008 Canuck Awards winners ===
- Molson Cup - Roberto Luongo
- Cyclone Taylor Trophy - Roberto Luongo
- Cyrus H. McLean Trophy - Henrik Sedin
- Babe Pratt Trophy - Willie Mitchell
- Fred J. Hume Award - Alexandre Burrows
- Most Exciting Player Award - Alexandre Burrows

==== Markus Naslund ====
- Recorded his 500th career point as Canuck captain on October 26, 2007, at Washington.
- Recorded his 11th career NHL hat trick on November 21, 2007, at Minnesota. With the hat trick Naslund is tied with Tony Tanti for the most hat tricks by a Canuck player with 10.
- Recorded a four-game point streak November 16–21, scoring 6–2–8.
- Recorded an assist on December 5, 2007, at Chicago to become the all-time franchise leader with 725 points.
- Surpassed 800 career NHL points on December 27, 2007, vs. Calgary.
- Played in his 1,000th career NHL game on January 17, 2008, at Detroit.

==== Roberto Luongo ====
- Made 26 saves and established a club record by registering his third consecutive shutout on November 29, 2007, vs. Columbus.
- Was named the NHL's Second Star for November 2007, posting an 8–2–2 record, 1.56 GAA, .940 save percentage and four shutouts.
- Was named the NHL's first star of the week on December 3, 2007, after he posted a 2–1–0 record with a 0.67 goals-against average, a .976 save percentage and two shutouts from November 28-December 2.
- Was voted in by the fans to represent the Western Conference at the 2008 All-Star Game in Atlanta, as the starting goaltender. Eventually, Luongo decided to skip the All-Star Game to spend time with his pregnant wife in Florida.

==== Trevor Linden ====
- Recorded his 412th career Canuck assist on November 8, 2007, at Calgary to become the all-time franchise assists leader. Linden surpassed the previous record of 411 that was held by Stan Smyl.
- Played in his 1,100th game in a Canucks uniform on December 5, 2007, at Chicago.
- Was awarded the NHL Foundation Player Award on May 22, 2008, along with Tampa Bay's Vincent Lecavalier.

==== Henrik Sedin ====
- Played in his 500th career NHL and Canuck game on November 16, 2007, vs. Minnesota.
- Was selected by the NHL to represent the Western Conference at the 2008 All-Star Game in Atlanta.

==== Brendan Morrison ====
- Recorded his 300th career assist on October 6, 2007, at Calgary.
- Sustained a wrist injury, which ended his current NHL Ironman streak at 542 games. His franchise leading Ironman streak stopped at 534 games on December 12, 2007.

==== Mattias Ohlund ====
- Recorded his 200th career NHL and Canuck assist on November 3, 2007, at Colorado.
- Scored a goal on December 15, 2007, at Edmonton to surpass Jyrki Lumme to become the all-time leader in goal scoring by a Canucks defenceman with 84 career goals.

===== Others =====
- Taylor Pyatt played in his 400th career game on November 9, 2007, vs. Colorado.
- Willie Mitchell played in his 400th career game on November 9, 2007, vs. Colorado.
- Brad Isbister played in his 500th career NHL game on November 16, 2007, vs. Minnesota.
- Daniel Sedin played in his 500th career NHL and Canuck game on November 23, 2007, at St. Louis.
- Jason Jaffray recorded his first career goal and assist in his NHL debut and was named third star of the game on December 12, 2007, at Anaheim.
- Alexander Edler was selected to represent the Western Conference at the 2008 YoungStars Game in Atlanta.
- Matt Cooke recorded an assist to earn his 200th career NHL and Canuck point on February 1, 2008, at Florida.
- Alexandre Burrows played in his 200th career NHL and Canuck game on March 25, 2008, at Calgary.

== Transactions ==
=== Trades ===
June 23, 2007	To Vancouver Canucks Ryan Shannon	To Anaheim Ducks Jason King; Conditional pick in 2009
June 23, 2007	To Vancouver Canucks Jim Sharrow	To Atlanta Thrashers Jesse Schultz
August 1, 2007	To Vancouver Canucks Zack Fitzgerald	To St. Louis Blues Francois-Pierre Guenette
February 26, 2008	To Vancouver Canucks Matt Pettinger	To Washington Capitals Matt Cooke

=== Free agents acquired ===
Player	Former team	Contract terms
F Brad Isbister	New York Rangers	1 year, $525,000
F Byron Ritchie	Calgary Flames	1 year, $675,000
G Curtis Sanford	St. Louis Blues	1 year, $600,000
D Aaron Miller	Los Angeles Kings	1 year, $1.5 million

=== Free agents lost ===
Player	New team	Contract Terms
G Dany Sabourin	Pittsburgh Penguins	2 years, $1.025 million
F Bryan Smolinski	Montreal Canadiens	1 year, $2 million
G Wade Flaherty	Chicago Blackhawks	
D Prestin Ryan	Chicago Blackhawks	
F Nathan Smith	Pittsburgh Penguins	1 year, $500,000
D Brent Sopel	Chicago Blackhawks	1 year, $1.5 million
D Rory Fitzpatrick	Philadelphia Flyers	1 year, $550,000

=== Received from waivers ===
Player	From
D Mike Weaver	Los Angeles Kings
C Kris Beech	Columbus Blue Jackets

=== Placed on waivers ===
Player	New Team
C Kris Beech	Washington Capitals

=== Draft picks ===
Vancouver's picks at the 2007 NHL entry draft in Columbus, Ohio.

Round	#	Player	Nationality	College/Junior/Club team (League)
1	25	Patrick White (C)	United States	Tri-City Storm (USHL)
2	33	Taylor Ellington (D)	Canada	Everett Silvertips (WHL)
5	145	Charles-Antoine Messier (C)	Canada	Baie-Comeau Drakkar (QMJHL)
5	146	Ilya Kablukov (LW)	Russia	CKSA Moscow (RSL)
6	176	Taylor Matson (C)	United States	Des Moines Buccaneers (USHL)
7	206	Dan Gendur (RW)	Canada	Everett Silvertips (WHL)

== Farm teams ==
=== Manitoba Moose ===
AHL affiliate that is based in Winnipeg, Manitoba and their home arena is the MTS Centre. The team has been affiliated with the Vancouver Canucks since the 2000–01 AHL season.

=== Victoria Salmon Kings ===
ECHL affiliate that is based in Victoria, British Columbia and their home arena is the Save-On-Foods Memorial Centre. The team has been affiliated with the Vancouver Canucks since the 2006–07 ECHL season.

== See also ==
- 2007–08 NHL season
