= 2007–08 Calgary Flames season =

NHL team season

2007–08 Calgary Flames
- Division: 3rd Northwest
- Conference: 7th Western
- 2007–08 record: 42–30–10
- Home record: 21–11–9
- Road record: 21–19–1
- Goals for: 229
- Goals against: 227

Team information
- General manager: Darryl Sutter
- Coach: Mike Keenan
- Captain: Jarome Iginla
- Alternate captains: Owen Nolan; Robyn Regehr; Rhett Warrener; Stephane Yelle
- Arena: Pengrowth Saddledome
- Average attendance: 19,289 (100%)

Team leaders
- Goals: Jarome Iginla (50)
- Assists: Jarome Iginla (48)
- Points: Jarome Iginla (98)
- Penalty minutes: Dion Phaneuf (182)
- Plus/minus: Jarome Iginla (+27)
- Wins: Miikka Kiprusoff (39)
- Goals against average: Miikka Kiprusoff (2.69)

The 2007–08 Calgary Flames season was the 28th season for the Calgary Flames and 36th season for the Flames franchise in the National Hockey League (NHL).

In a surprise move, the Flames announced on June 14 that Jim Playfair would be replaced by "Iron" Mike Keenan as the team's head coach. Playfair remained with the Flames organization until 2011. Keenan entered the season sixth all-time in the NHL in wins.

General manager Darryl Sutter spent big bucks on Cory Sarich. He also acquired Adrian Aucoin (and his $4 million annual salary) in a trade. Owen Nolan, Anders Eriksson, and Mark Smith are all brought in as GM Sutter's free-agent reclamation projects. Sutter is unable to come to terms with Mark Giordano, and the highly rated prospect heads to the Dynamo Moscow in Russia instead of the NHL. Sports writer Steve MacFarlane observes that "The team looks like it has no direction—and no confidence in an unpredictable coach".

At the end of the regular season, Miikka Kiprusoff's goals against average of 2.69 was his worst as a Flame up until that point.

In the playoffs, the team fell to the Sharks in seven games in the first round.

== Team notes ==
On December 16, Keenan recorded his 600th career win as a head coach in a 5–3 victory over one of his former teams, the St. Louis Blues.

Al MacInnis was among four players inducted into the Hockey Hall of Fame on November 12, 2007. MacInnis spent 13 years in Calgary, and captured the Conn Smythe Trophy as playoff MVP when the Flames won the Stanley Cup in 1989.

On November 29, captain Jarome Iginla played in his 804th game, setting a new franchise record for games played in a Flames uniform, surpassing Al MacInnis' mark. Two nights later, Iginla registered his 700th career point in a game against the Columbus Blue Jackets. On March 10, Iginla scored his 365th goal, surpassing Theoren Fleury's mark of 364 to become the Flames' all-time goal scoring leader.

In December, the Flames became the third team in NHL history to win all six games of a six-game road trip, a feat previously accomplished by the 1971–72 Bruins and 1982–83 Flyers. The 2001–02 Red Wings also won six consecutive road games, though that trip was broken in half by the 2002 Winter Olympics.

Two Flames players were voted to start for the Western Conference at the 2008 All-Star Game. Defenceman Dion Phaneuf joined Iginla for the game, which was held in Atlanta, Georgia.

On February 18, Flames' prospect Mickey Renaud, a fifth round pick in the 2007 draft, collapsed and died at the age of 19 at his home in Tecumseh, Ontario. Renaud had been playing for the Windsor Spitfires of the Ontario Hockey League, and was the team's captain. The cause of death was not immediately known.

== Regular season ==
=== Divisional standings ===
Northwest Division
		GP	W	L	OTL	GF	GA	Pts
**1**	**y – Minnesota Wild**	**82**	**44**	**28**	**10**	**223**	**218**	**98**
**2**	**Colorado Avalanche**	**82**	**44**	**31**	**7**	**231**	**219**	**95**
**3**	**Calgary Flames**	**82**	**42**	**30**	**10**	**229**	**227**	**94**
4	Edmonton Oilers	82	41	35	6	235	251	88
5	Vancouver Canucks	82	39	33	10	213	215	88

=== Conference standings ===
Western Conference
R		Div	GP	W	L	OTL	GF	GA	Pts
**1**	**p – Detroit Red Wings**	**CE**	**82**	**54**	**21**	**7**	**257**	**184**	115
**2**	**y – San Jose Sharks**	**PA**	**82**	**49**	**23**	**10**	**222**	**193**	108
**3**	**y – Minnesota Wild**	**NW**	**82**	**44**	**28**	**10**	**223**	**218**	98
**4**	**Anaheim Ducks**	**PA**	**82**	**47**	**27**	**8**	**205**	**191**	102
**5**	**Dallas Stars**	**PA**	**82**	**45**	**30**	**7**	**242**	**207**	97
**6**	**Colorado Avalanche**	**NW**	**82**	**44**	**31**	**7**	**231**	**219**	95
**7**	**Calgary Flames**	**NW**	**82**	**42**	**30**	**10**	**229**	**227**	94
**8**	**Nashville Predators**	**CE**	**82**	**41**	**32**	**9**	**230**	**229**	91
8.5
9	Edmonton Oilers	NW	82	41	35	6	235	251	88
10	Chicago Blackhawks	CE	82	40	34	8	239	235	88
11	Vancouver Canucks	NW	82	39	33	10	213	215	88
12	Phoenix Coyotes	PA	82	38	37	7	214	231	83
13	Columbus Blue Jackets	CE	82	34	36	12	193	218	80
14	St. Louis Blues	CE	82	33	36	13	205	237	79
15	Los Angeles Kings	PA	82	32	43	7	231	266	71

Divisions: PA – Pacific, CE – Central, NW – Northwest
bold – qualified for playoffs, y – division winner, p – Presidents' Trophy winner

== Playoffs ==
The Flames finished 7th in the Western Conference with 94 points, earning a first-round match-up against the Pacific Division champion San Jose Sharks. It was the third time the two teams had met in the playoffs, with the Sharks defeating the Flames in seven games in the first round of the 1995 playoffs, while the Flames defeated San Jose in six games in the 2004 Western Conference final.

After splitting the first two games in San Jose, the Flames gave up three goals to the Sharks in the first 3½ minutes of the game, but came back to win 4–3. In doing so, the Flames became only the second team in NHL history, after the 1985 Minnesota North Stars to come back from a 3–0 deficit in the first ten minutes of a playoff game. During Game 6, in which the Flames faced elimination, they scored once in the first and second period each to shut out the Sharks 2–0, as the Sharks did during Game 2. Nolan and Langkow scored both goals respectively and Kiprusoff made 21 saves for his 6th postseason shutout.

== Schedule and results ==
=== Regular season ===
2007–08 regular season
October: 6–3–3 (home: 4–2–2; road: 2–1–1)

Game	Date	Visitor	Score	Home	OT	Decision	Attendance	Record	Points	Recap
1	October 4	Philadelphia	3 – 2	Calgary		Kiprusoff	19,305	0–1–0	0	L
2	October 6	Vancouver	4 – 3	Calgary	OT	Kiprusoff	19,289	0–1–1	1	OTL
3	October 10	Calgary	2 – 4	Detroit		Kiprusoff	16,629	0–2–1	1	L
4	October 12	Calgary	3 – 2	Dallas	OT	Kiprusoff	17,132	1–2–1	3	W
5	October 13	Calgary	7 – 4	Nashville		Kiprusoff	13,152	2–2–1	5	W
6	October 16	Calgary	4 – 5	Colorado	SO	Kiprusoff	16,722	2–2–2	6	OTL
7	October 18	Los Angeles	3 – 4	Calgary		Kiprusoff	19,305	3–2–2	8	W
8	October 20	Edmonton	1 – 4	Calgary		Kiprusoff	19,289	4–2–2	10	W
9	October 22	San Jose	4 – 1	Calgary		Kiprusoff	19,289	4–3–2	10	L
10	October 24	Minnesota	3 – 5	Calgary		Kiprusoff	19,289	5–3–2	12	W
11	October 26	Colorado	3 – 2	Calgary	OT	Kiprusoff	19,289	5–3–3	13	OTL
12	October 30	Nashville	1 – 5	Calgary		Kiprusoff	19,289	6–3–3	15	W

November: 4–10–0 (home: 2–5–0; road: 2–5–0)

Game	Date	Visitor	Score	Home	OT	Decision	Attendance	Record	Points	Recap
13	November 1	Detroit	4 – 1	Calgary		Kiprusoff	19,289	6–4–3	15	L
14	November 3	Calgary	1 – 4	Minnesota		Kiprusoff	18,568	6–5–3	15	L
15	November 5	Calgary	1 – 4	Colorado		Kiprusoff	15,655	6–6–3	15	L
16	November 8	Vancouver	3 – 2	Calgary		Kiprusoff	19,289	6–7–3	15	L
17	November 10	Edmonton	4 – 2	Calgary		Kiprusoff	19,289	6–8–3	15	L
18	November 13	Minnesota	2 – 3	Calgary		Kiprusoff	19,289	7–8–3	17	W
19	November 17	Calgary	3 – 1	Edmonton		Kiprusoff	16,839	8–8–3	19	W
20	November 18	Calgary	1 – 4	Vancouver		Kiprusoff	18,630	8–9–3	19	L
21	November 20	Colorado	1 – 4	Calgary		Kiprusoff	19,289	9–9–3	21	W
22	November 22	Chicago	2 – 1	Calgary		Kiprusoff	19,289	9–10–3	21	L
23	November 24	Calgary	5 – 2	Colorado		Kiprusoff	18,007	10–10–3	23	W
24	November 25	Calgary	0 – 3	St. Louis		McElhinney	15,138	10–11–3	23	L
25	November 27	Calgary	3 – 5	Detroit		McElhinney	17,108	10–12–3	23	L
26	November 29	Anaheim	4 – 1	Calgary		Kiprusoff	19,289	10–13–3	23	L

December: 9–1–4 (home: 3–0–4; road: 6–1–0)

Game	Date	Visitor	Score	Home	OT	Decision	Attendance	Record	Points	Recap
27	December 1	Columbus	4 – 3	Calgary	OT	Kiprusoff	19,289	10–13–4	24	OTL
28	December 4	St. Louis	1 – 3	Calgary		Kiprusoff	19,289	11–13–4	26	W
29	December 6	Pittsburgh	3 – 2	Calgary	SO	Kiprusoff	19,289	11–13–5	27	OTL
30	December 9	Calgary	3 – 2	Chicago		Kiprusoff	13,382	12–13–5	29	W
31	December 11	Calgary	2 – 1	Florida	SO	Kiprusoff	12,499	13–13–5	31	W
32	December 13	Calgary	9 – 6	Tampa Bay		Kiprusoff	19,026	14–13–5	33	W
33	December 14	Calgary	4 – 3	Carolina		Kiprusoff	15,536	15–13–5	35	W
34	December 16	Calgary	5 – 3	St. Louis		Kiprusoff	16,733	16–13–5	37	W
35	December 18	Calgary	3 – 1	Columbus		Kiprusoff	13,181	17–13–5	39	W
36	December 21	Dallas	3 – 2	Calgary	OT	Kiprusoff	19,289	17–13–6	40	OTL
37	December 23	New Jersey	1 – 0	Calgary	OT	Kiprusoff	19,289	17–13–7	41	OTL
38	December 27	Calgary	3 – 5	Vancouver		Kiprusoff	18,630	17–14–7	41	L
39	December 29	Anaheim	3 – 5	Calgary		Kiprusoff	19,289	18–14–7	43	W
40	December 31	Vancouver	1 – 2	Calgary		Kiprusoff	19,289	19–14–7	45	W

January: 7–3–1 (home: 4–1–1; road: 3–2–0)

Game	Date	Visitor	Score	Home	OT	Decision	Attendance	Record	Points	Recap
41	January 2	NY Rangers	3 – 4	Calgary		Kiprusoff	19,289	20–14–7	47	W
42	January 3	Calgary	3 – 2	San Jose	OT	Kiprusoff	17,496	21–14–7	49	W
43	January 5	Calgary	6 – 4	Los Angeles		Kiprusoff	18,118	22–14–7	51	W
44	January 8	Phoenix	3 – 1	Calgary		Kiprusoff	19,289	22–15–7	51	L
45	January 11	NY Islanders	5 – 4	Calgary	SO	Kiprusoff	19,289	22–15–8	52	OTL
46	January 13	Calgary	1 – 2	Edmonton		Kiprusoff	16,839	22–16–8	52	L
47	January 15	Calgary	0 – 3	Nashville		Kiprusoff	11,764	22–17–8	52	L
48	January 16	Calgary	3 – 2	Minnesota	SO	Kiprusoff	18,568	23–17–8	54	W
49	January 18	Los Angeles	1 – 6	Calgary		Kiprusoff	19,289	24–17–8	56	W
50	January 22	Minnesota	1 – 2	Calgary		Kiprusoff	19,289	25–17–8	58	W
51	January 30	San Jose	4 – 5	Calgary		Kiprusoff	19,289	26–17–8	60	W

February: 7–6–1 (home: 3–2–1; road: 4–4–0)

Game	Date	Visitor	Score	Home	OT	Decision	Attendance	Record	Points	Recap
52	February 2	Dallas	2 – 1	Calgary		Kiprusoff	19,289	26–18–8	60	L
53	February 4	Calgary	0 – 5	Edmonton		Joseph	16,839	26–19–8	60	L
54	February 5	Phoenix	3 – 4	Calgary	SO	Kiprusoff	19,289	27–19–8	62	W
55	February 7	Chicago	3 – 1	Calgary		Kiprusoff	19,289	27–20–8	62	L
56	February 9	Edmonton	1 – 4	Calgary		Kiprusoff	19,289	28–20–8	64	W
57	February 12	Calgary	4 – 3	San Jose	OT	Kiprusoff	17,269	29–20–8	66	W
58	February 15	Calgary	3 – 6	Los Angeles		Kiprusoff	18,118	29–21–8	66	L
59	February 17	Calgary	2 – 4	Anaheim		Kiprusoff	17,174	29–22–8	66	L
60	February 19	Calgary	4 – 1	Phoenix		Kiprusoff	15,208	30–22–8	68	W
61	February 20	Calgary	3 – 2	Dallas		Joseph	18,584	31–22–8	70	W
62	February 22	Detroit	0 – 1	Calgary		Kiprusoff	19,289	32–22–8	72	W
63	February 24	Calgary	2 – 1	Minnesota		Kiprusoff	18,568	33–22–8	74	W
64	February 26	Colorado	3 – 2	Calgary	OT	Kiprusoff	19,289	33–22–9	75	OTL
65	February 29	Calgary	1 – 3	Anaheim		Kiprusoff	17,174	33–23–9	75	L

March: 7–6–1 (home: 5–1–1; road: 2–5–0)

Game	Date	Visitor	Score	Home	OT	Decision	Attendance	Record	Points	Recap
66	March 1	Calgary	3 – 1	Phoenix		Joseph	17,529	34–23–9	77	W
67	March 4	Columbus	0 – 1	Calgary		Kiprusoff	19,239	35–23–9	79	W
68	March 7	Nashville	2 – 1	Calgary	OT	Kiprusoff	19,289	35–23–10	80	OTL
69	March 10	St. Louis	3 – 7	Calgary		Kiprusoff	19,289	36–23–10	82	W
70	March 12	Calgary	2 – 3	Washington		Kiprusoff	17,560	36–24–10	82	L
71	March 13	Calgary	4 – 6	Atlanta		Joseph	16,244	36–25–10	82	L
72	March 16	Calgary	4 – 2	Chicago		Kiprusoff	20,177	37–25–10	84	W
73	March 18	Calgary	0 – 3	Columbus		Kiprusoff	14,270	37–26–10	84	L
74	March 20	Colorado	1 – 2	Calgary		Kiprusoff	19,289	38–26–10	86	W
75	March 22	Minnesota	4 – 5	Calgary		Kiprusoff	19,289	39–26–10	88	W
76	March 24	Calgary	0 – 2	Colorado		Kiprusoff	18,007	39–27–10	88	L
77	March 25	Vancouver	2 – 3	Calgary		Kiprusoff	19,289	40–27–10	90	W
78	March 29	Edmonton	2 – 1	Calgary		Kiprusoff	19,289	40–28–10	90	L
79	March 30	Calgary	2 – 6	Vancouver		Kiprusoff	18,630	40–29–10	90	L

April: 2–1–0 (home: 0–0–0; road: 2–1–0)

Game	Date	Visitor	Score	Home	OT	Decision	Attendance	Record	Points	Recap
80	April 1	Calgary	3 – 2	Edmonton		Kiprusoff	16,839	41–29–10	92	W
81	April 3	Calgary	1 – 3	Minnesota		Kiprusoff	18,568	41–30–10	92	L
82	April 5	Calgary	7 – 1	Vancouver		Joseph	18,630	42–30–10	94	W

Legend: W Win (2 points) L Loss (0 points) OTL Overtime/shootout loss (1 point)

=== Playoffs ===
2008 Stanley Cup playoffs
Western Conference Quarterfinals vs. San Jose Sharks (2) – Sharks win 4–3

Game	Date	Visitor	Score	Home	OT	Decision	Attendance	Series	Recap
1	April 9	Calgary	3–2	San Jose		Kiprusoff	17,496	Flames lead 1–0	W
2	April 10	Calgary	0–2	San Jose		Kiprusoff	17,496	Series tied 1–1	L
3	April 13	San Jose	3–4	Calgary		Joseph	19,289	Flames lead 2–1	W
4	April 15	San Jose	3–2	Calgary		Kiprusoff	19,289	Series tied 2–2	L
5	April 17	Calgary	3–4	San Jose		Kiprusoff	17,496	Sharks lead 3–2	L
6	April 20	San Jose	0–2	Calgary		Kiprusoff	19,289	Series tied 3–3	W
7	April 22	Calgary	3–5	San Jose		Kiprusoff	17,496	Sharks win series 4–3	L

Legend: W Win L Loss

== Player statistics ==
=== Skaters ===
Note: GP = Games played; G = Goals; A = Assists; Pts = Points; PIM = Penalty minutes; +/- = Plus/minus

	Regular season						Playoffs
Player	GP	G	A	Pts	PIM	+/-	GP	G	A	Pts	PIM	+/-
Jarome Iginla	82	50	48	98	83	27	7	4	5	9	2	-1
Kristian Huselius	81	25	41	66	40	10	7	0	4	4	6	-1
Daymond Langkow	80	30	35	65	19	16	7	3	2	5	0	E
Dion Phaneuf	82	17	43	60	182	12	7	3	4	7	4	-2
Alex Tanguay	78	18	40	58	48	11	7	0	4	4	4	-1
Matthew Lombardi	82	14	22	36	67	-6	7	0	0	0	4	-2
Adrian Aucoin	76	10	25	35	37	13	7	0	3	3	4	3
Craig Conroy	79	12	22	34	71	6	7	0	2	2	8	E
Owen Nolan	77	16	16	32	71	6	7	3	2	5	2	E
Robyn Regehr	82	5	15	20	79	11	7	0	2	2	2	E
Anders Eriksson	61	1	17	18	36	-5	3	0	1	1	2	E
Stephane Yelle	74	3	9	12	20	-4	7	2	0	2	6	2
Dustin Boyd	48	7	5	12	6	-11	—	—	—	—	—	—
David Moss	41	4	7	11	10	-4	5	1	1	2	4	2
Wayne Primeau	43	3	7	10	26	-3	7	1	0	1	4	E
Eric Nystrom	44	3	7	10	48	-5	7	0	0	0	2	-2
Cory Sarich	80	2	5	7	135	2	7	0	1	1	4	1
Marcus Nilson	47	3	2	5	4	2	2	0	0	0	0	E
Mark Smith	54	1	3	4	59	-6	—	—	—	—	—	—
Rhett Warrener	31	1	3	4	21	-2	—	—	—	—	—	—
Eric Godard	74	1	1	2	171	-8	5	0	0	0	2	E
Jim Vandermeer^{†}	21	0	2	2	39	4	7	0	0	0	4	-6
David Hale	58	0	2	2	46	E	6	0	0	0	2	-1
Tim Ramholt	1	0	0	0	0	-1	—	—	—	—	—	—

^{†}Denotes player spent time with another team before joining Calgary. Stats reflect time with the Flames only.

=== Goaltenders ===
Note: GP = Games played; TOI = Time on ice (minutes); W = Wins; L = Losses; OT = Overtime/shootout losses; GA = Goals against; SO = Shutouts; SV% = Save percentage; GAA = Goals against average

	Regular season									Playoffs
Player	GP	TOI	W	L	OT	GA	SO	Sv%	GAA	GP	TOI	W	L	GA	SO	Sv%	GAA
Miikka Kiprusoff	76	4398	39	26	10	197	2	.906	2.69	7	336	2	4	18	1	.908	3.21
Curtis Joseph	9	400	3	2	0	17	0	.906	2.55	2	79	1	0	1	0	.970	0.76
Curtis McElhinney	5	150	0	2	0	5	0	.902	2.00	—	—	—	—	—	—	—	—
Matt Keetley	1	9	0	0	0	0	0	1.000	0.00	—	—	—	—	—	—	—	—

== Awards and records ==
=== Records ===
- 7: most games to start the season with a player scoring two goals in one game.
- 6: consecutive wins on a single road trip (tied for record).

=== Milestones ===
Regular Season
Player	Milestone	Reached
Dion Phaneuf	100th NHL point	October 4, 2007
Daymond Langkow	200th NHL goal 500th NHL point	October 18, 2007
Daymond Langkow	300th NHL assist	October 20, 2007
Curtis McElhinney	1st NHL game	October 22, 2007
Owen Nolan	1000th NHL game	October 22, 2007
Eric Nystrom	1st NHL goal 1st NHL point	October 30, 2007
Matt Keetley	1st NHL game	November 5, 2007
Jarome Iginla	804th NHL game (franchise record)	November 29, 2007
Tim Ramholt	1st NHL game	November 29, 2007
Jarome Iginla	700th NHL point	December 1, 2007
Mike Keenan	600th Coaching win	December 16, 2007
Stephane Yelle	800th NHL game	December 18, 2007
Owen Nolan	800th NHL point	February 24, 2008
Jarome Iginla	365th NHL goal (franchise record)	March 10, 2008

== Transactions ==
The Flames have been involved in the following transactions during the 2007–08 season.

=== Trades ===
June 22, 2007	To Calgary Flames Adrian Aucoin; 7th-round pick in 2007 – C. J. Severyn	To Chicago Blackhawks Andrei Zyuzin; Steve Marr
June 22, 2007	To Calgary Flames 24th overall pick in 2007 – Mikael Backlund; 3rd round pick in 2007 – John Negrin	To St. Louis Blues 18th overall pick in 2007 – Ian Cole
February 20, 2008	To Calgary Flames Jim Vandermeer	To Philadelphia Flyers 3rd-round pick in 2009 – Adam Morrison

=== Free agents ===
Players signed	Former team	Contract terms
Cory Sarich	Tampa Bay Lightning	5 years, $18 million
Owen Nolan	Phoenix Coyotes	1 year, $2 million
Anders Eriksson	Columbus Blue Jackets	2 years, $3 million
Grant Stevenson	San Jose Sharks	1 year, $475,000
Mark Smith	San Jose Sharks	1 year, $488,000
Curtis Joseph	Phoenix Coyotes	1 year, $1.5 million

Players lost	New team
Roman Hamrlik	Montreal Canadiens
Byron Ritchie	Vancouver Canucks
Brad Stuart	Los Angeles Kings
Brad Ference	Detroit Red Wings
Jamie McLennan	Metallurg (RSL)
Mark Giordano	Moscow Dynamo (RSL)

== Draft picks ==
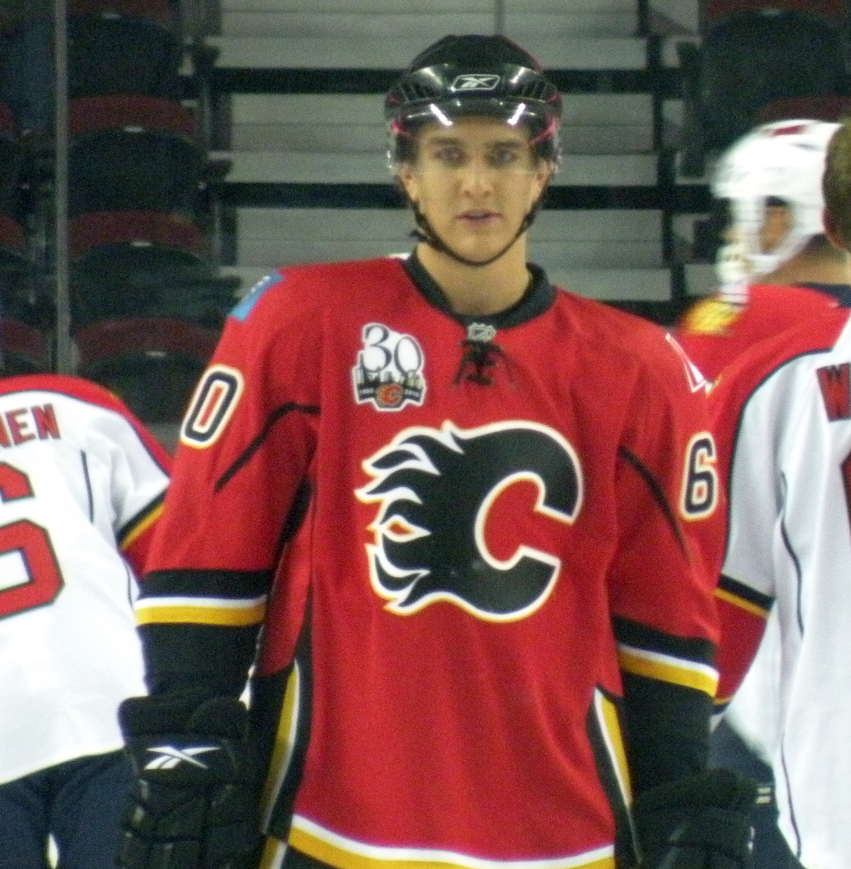
Mikael Backlund was the Flames first round selection in 2007.

The Flames made five selections at the 2007 NHL entry draft in Columbus, Ohio. Calgary selected Swedish forward Mikael Backlund with their first selection, 24th overall. Heading into the draft, Backlund was the second highest ranked European prospect, and 10th overall, by International Scouting Services. Backlund joined third round selection John Negrin in making their NHL debuts with the Flames in the 2008–09 season. The Flames lost their fifth round draft pick, Mickey Renaud, when the 19-year-old captain of the Windsor Spitfires collapsed and died in his home late in the 2007–08 OHL season. The Ontario Hockey League created a new trophy in his honour, the Mickey Renaud Captain's Trophy in 2009.

Rnd	Pick	Player	Nationality	Position	Team (league)	NHL statistics				
Rnd	Pick	Player	Nationality	Position	Team (league)	GP	G	A	Pts	PIM
1	24	Mikael Backlund^{†}	Sweden	C	Västerås IK (SEL)	298	51	77	128	115
3	70	John Negrin	Canada	D	Kootenay Ice (WHL)	3	0	1	1	2
4	116	Keith Aulie^{†}	Canada	D	Brandon Wheat Kings (WHL)	167	4	10	14	196
5	143	Mickey Renaud	Canada	C	Windsor Spitfires (OHL)					
7	186	C. J. Severyn	United States	LW	U.S. National Team Development Program (NAHL)					

Statistics are updated to the end of the 2014–15 NHL season. ^{†} denotes player was on an NHL roster in 2014–15.

== Farm teams ==
=== Quad City Flames ===
After two seasons in Omaha, Nebraska, and over $4 million in operating losses, the Calgary Flames chose to relocate their American Hockey League affiliate to the Quad Cities. The new team, known as the Quad City Flames, will play in the West Division of the Western Conference.

=== Las Vegas Wranglers ===
Led by team scoring leader Chris Ferraro, the Las Vegas Wranglers reached the ECHL's Kelly Cup Finals in 2007–08 where they fell to the Cincinnati Cyclones four games to two. Head Coach Glen Gulutzan expressed the team's disappointment in losing the championship. "It's an empty feeling, and I certainly don't like to talk about it, but the only way around it for me now is to try to move forward and start looking at next year," said Gulutzan.

The playoff disappointment represented a bitter end to a successful season, as the Wranglers finished first in the Pacific Division for the second consecutive season. Their 47–13–5–7 record was the best in the National Conference, and their 106 points was good enough to finish third overall in the ECHL.

== See also ==
- 2007–08 NHL season
