= 2007–08 San Jose Sharks season =

National Hockey League team season

2007–08 San Jose Sharks
- Pacific Division champions
- Division: 1st Pacific
- Conference: 2nd Western
- 2007–08 record: 49–23–10
- Home record: 22–13–6
- Road record: 27–10–4
- Goals for: 222
- Goals against: 193

Team information
- General manager: Doug Wilson
- Coach: Ron Wilson
- Captain: Patrick Marleau
- Alternate captains: Mike Grier; Craig Rivet; Joe Thornton
- Arena: HP Pavilion at San Jose
- Average attendance: 17,411 (99.5%)

Team leaders
- Goals: Joe Thornton (29)
- Assists: Joe Thornton (67)
- Points: Joe Thornton (96)
- Penalty minutes: Craig Rivet (104)
- Plus/minus: Douglas Murray (+20) Patrick Marleau -19
- Wins: Evgeni Nabokov (46)
- Goals against average: Brian Boucher (1.76)

The 2007–08 San Jose Sharks season began on October 4, 2007. It was the San Jose Sharks' 17th season in the National Hockey League (NHL). The Sharks finished the season as the Pacific Division champions, and second in the Western Conference and the entire league with a 49–23–10 record for a total of 108 points.

== Offseason ==
During the pre-season, the 2007 NHL entry draft took place in Columbus, Ohio, on June 22–23. Additionally, the free agency period began on July 1.

== Regular season ==
The Sharks began a win streak of road games on November 14, 2007, when they beat the Dallas Stars with a shootout win. The Sharks went on to win nine more consecutive road games, which gave them 10 straight wins on the road. The streak ended when the Sharks lost to the Anaheim Ducks on January 13, 2008. This was also the game where Head Coach Ron Wilson gave the Sharks' backup goaltender, Thomas Greiss, his first start and rested Evgeni Nabokov, who was the starting goaltender for all the other Sharks games played up until the All-Star break.

The Sharks' streak of ten-straight road wins was second to the 12 road game win streak posted by the Detroit Red Wings in 2006.

Jonathan Cheechoo earned his first hat-trick of the season on February 9, 2008 at the HP Pavilion against the Nashville Predators. This was the ninth time that Cheechoo earned a hat-trick in his career. The Sharks won the game 4–3 and gave Ron Wilson his 500th win as an NHL coach, the 11th coach in League history to reach the milestone.

The Sharks have continued with another win streak of 11 games at home and on the road. Since February 21, when the Sharks played the Philadelphia Flyers away in Philadelphia and won the game 3–1, they started their lengthy winning streak. On February 29, 2008, the Sharks played the Detroit Red Wings in Detroit and came across a 3–2 win on a controversial goal by Devin Setoguchi to push the winning streak to four consecutive games. San Jose played the Montreal Canadiens on March 3 in San Jose and pulled away with a 6–4 win to push their winning streak to six games. On March 5 in San Jose, they played the Ottawa Senators and pulled away with a winner in overtime by Patrick Marleau to push their winning streak to seven games. The Sharks won the Pacific Division and finished second in the Western Conference.

The Sharks finished the regular season having allowed the fewest power-play goals, with 44, and with the best penalty-kill percentage (85.81%).

=== Divisional standings ===
Pacific Division
		GP	W	L	OTL	GF	GA	Pts
**1**	**y – San Jose Sharks**	**82**	**49**	**23**	**10**	**222**	**193**	**108**
**2**	**Anaheim Ducks**	**82**	**47**	**27**	**8**	**205**	**191**	**102**
**3**	**Dallas Stars**	**82**	**45**	**30**	**7**	**242**	**207**	**97**
4	Phoenix Coyotes	82	38	37	7	214	231	83
5	Los Angeles Kings	82	32	43	7	231	266	71

=== Conference standings ===
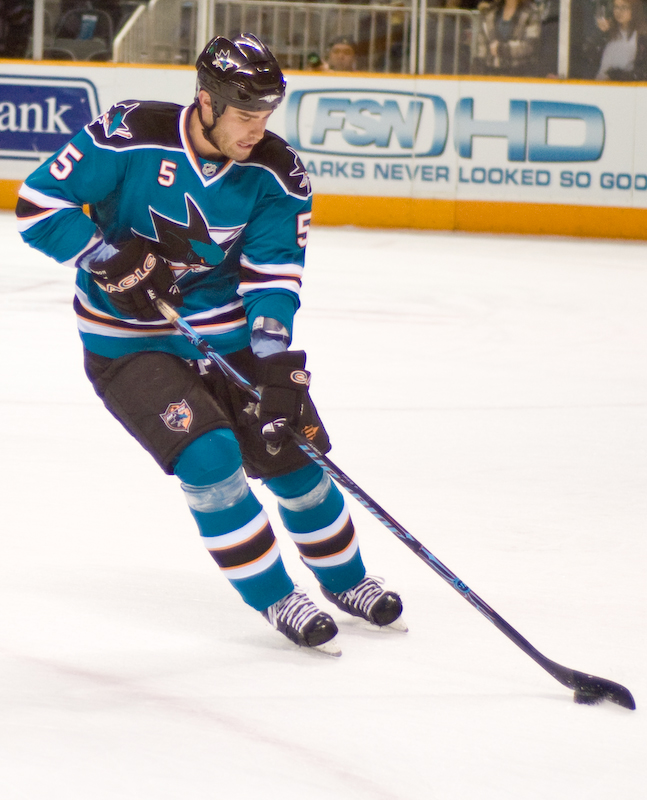
Rob Davison coming up the left side with the puck.

Western Conference
R		Div	GP	W	L	OTL	GF	GA	Pts
**1**	**p – Detroit Red Wings**	**CE**	**82**	**54**	**21**	**7**	**257**	**184**	115
**2**	**y – San Jose Sharks**	**PA**	**82**	**49**	**23**	**10**	**222**	**193**	108
**3**	**y – Minnesota Wild**	**NW**	**82**	**44**	**28**	**10**	**223**	**218**	98
**4**	**Anaheim Ducks**	**PA**	**82**	**47**	**27**	**8**	**205**	**191**	102
**5**	**Dallas Stars**	**PA**	**82**	**45**	**30**	**7**	**242**	**207**	97
**6**	**Colorado Avalanche**	**NW**	**82**	**44**	**31**	**7**	**231**	**219**	95
**7**	**Calgary Flames**	**NW**	**82**	**42**	**30**	**10**	**229**	**227**	94
**8**	**Nashville Predators**	**CE**	**82**	**41**	**32**	**9**	**230**	**229**	91
8.5
9	Edmonton Oilers	NW	82	41	35	6	235	251	88
10	Chicago Blackhawks	CE	82	40	34	8	239	235	88
11	Vancouver Canucks	NW	82	39	33	10	213	215	88
12	Phoenix Coyotes	PA	82	38	37	7	214	231	83
13	Columbus Blue Jackets	CE	82	34	36	12	193	218	80
14	St. Louis Blues	CE	82	33	36	13	205	237	79
15	Los Angeles Kings	PA	82	32	43	7	231	266	71

Divisions: PA – Pacific, CE – Central, NW – Northwest
bold – qualified for playoffs, y – division winner, p – Presidents' Trophy winner

== Playoffs ==
On March 28, the Sharks clinched the Pacific Division title with a 3–1 win at Anaheim. The Sharks finished the regular season as the 2nd seed in the Western Conference. The Sharks began their first series, the Western Conference Quarter-finals, against the 7th seed Calgary Flames, losing the first game 3–2 but winning the second 2–0, tying the series at 1 win each. In the third game, the Sharks lost by a score of 4–3, falling back by 2 games to 1 game in the series. Game 4 saw Jonathan Cheechoo score the tying goal with just under five minutes to play in the third, and Joe Thornton scoring the game-winner with 9.4 seconds remaining in regulation to send the series back to San Jose tied at two games apiece. Back in San Jose for Game 5, the Flames' Jerome Iginla scored a 2nd period, 5-on-3 goal to give Calgary the first goal of the game, but the Sharks would score the next 4 goals and hang on for a 4–3 win for a 3–2 series lead. The Sharks showed poorly in Game 6, losing to Calgary in a shut-out, 2 -0, forcing Game 7. The Sharks played with Jeremy Roenick scoring twice and adding two assists to power the Sharks in a decisive 5–3 win over Calgary, clinching the series. The Sharks advanced to meet the Dallas Stars in Round 2 (Western Conference Semifinals) of the playoffs. In Game 1 of the Semifinals, the Sharks had a strong defensive showing at home, but lost in overtime to the Stars, 3–2, on a Brenden Morrow goal. After losing Games 2 & 3 and falling to a 3–0 deficit in the series, the Sharks won Game 4 in Dallas and Game 5 at home to force a Game 6 in Dallas. After playing into a fourth overtime period in the longest game in Sharks history (and 8th longest NHL game of all time), the Sharks season ended on a power play goal by the Stars' Brenden Morrow.

== Schedule and results ==
=== Preseason ===
2007 preseason
Preseason: 5–0–2 (home: 4–0–0; road: 1–0–2)

Game	Date	Visitor	Score	Home	OT	Decision	Attendance	Record	Recap
1	September 18	San Jose	5–6	Los Angeles	SO	Patzold	9,258	0–0–1	OTL
2	September 19	San Jose	1–0	Anaheim		Greiss	16,498	1–0–1	W
3	September 21	Anaheim	1–3	San Jose		Nabokov	14,837	2–0–1	W
4	September 22	Canucks	1–3	San Jose		Patzold	13,179	3–0–1	W
5	September 25	San Jose	2–3	Calgary	SO	Nabokov	19,289	3–0–2	OTL
6	September 26	Canucks	3–4	San Jose	SO	Greiss		4–0–2	W
7	September 29	Calgary	1–2	San Jose		Nabokov	14,579	5–0–2	W

Legend: W Win (2 points) L Loss (0 points) OTL Overtime/shootout loss (1 point)

=== Regular season ===
2007–08 regular season
October: 6–5–1 (home: 1–2–0; road: 5–3–1)

Game	Date	Visitor	Score	Home	OT	Decision	Attendance	Record	Points	Recap
1	October 4	San Jose	2–3	Edmonton	SO	Nabokov	16,839	0–0–1	1	OTL
2	October 5	San Jose	3–1	Vancouver		Nabokov	18,630	1–0–1	3	W
3	October 7	San Jose	2–6	Colorado		Nabokov	15,876	1–1–1	3	L
4	October 10	San Jose	2–1	Chicago		Nabokov	10,122	2–1–1	5	W
5	October 13	Boston	2–1	San Jose		Nabokov	17,496	2–2–1	5	L
6	October 15	San Jose	4–2	Vancouver		Nabokov	18,630	3–2–1	7	W
7	October 18	Detroit	4–2	San Jose		Nabokov	17,496	3–3–1	7	L
8	October 20	Nashville	0–3	San Jose		Nabokov	17,496	4–3–1	9	W
9	October 22	San Jose	4–1	Calgary		Nabokov	19,289	5–3–1	11	W
10	October 26	San Jose	1–5	Detroit		Nabokov	18,289	5–4–1	11	L
11	October 27	San Jose	1–2	Columbus		Nabokov	13,234	5–5–1	11	L
12	October 29	San Jose	4–2	Dallas		Nabokov	17,546	6–5–1	13	W

November: 6–3–3 (home: 3–3–2; road: 3–0–1)

Game	Date	Visitor	Score	Home	OT	Decision	Attendance	Record	Points	Recap
13	November 2	Los Angeles	5–2	San Jose		Nabokov	17,496	6–6–1	13	L
14	November 3	San Jose	3–1	Los Angeles		Nabokov	18,118	7–6–1	15	W
15	November 7	Dallas	3–1	San Jose		Nabokov	17,496	7–7–1	15	L
16	November 9	San Jose	2–3	Anaheim	SO	Nabokov	17,174	7–7–2	16	OTL
17	November 10	Phoenix	1–4	San Jose		Nabokov	17,496	8–7–2	18	W
18	November 12	Phoenix	0–5	San Jose		Nabokov	17,496	9–7–2	20	W
19	November 14	San Jose	4–3	Dallas	SO	Nabokov	17,682	10–7–2	22	W
20	November 15	San Jose	6–0	Phoenix		Nabokov	12,953	11–7–2	24	W
21	November 17	Anaheim	2–1	San Jose	SO	Nabokov	17,496	11–7–3	25	OTL
22	November 24	Los Angeles	2–1	San Jose		Nabokov	17,496	11–8–3	25	L
23	November 28	Los Angeles	3–2	San Jose	SO	Nabokov	17,071	11–8–4	26	OTL
24	November 30	Colorado	2–3	San Jose		Nabokov	17,496	12–8–4	28	W

December: 10–4–1 (home: 2–4–1; road: 8–0–0)

Game	Date	Visitor	Score	Home	OT	Decision	Attendance	Record	Points	Recap
25	December 3	San Jose	3–2	Colorado		Nabokov	15,213	13–8–4	30	W
26	December 5	San Jose	3–2	Dallas		Nabokov	17,318	14–8–4	32	W
27	December 7	San Jose	1–0	Phoenix		Nabokov	12,972	15–8–4	34	W
28	December 8	Buffalo	7–1	San Jose		Nabokov	17,496	15–9–4	34	L
29	December 11	Minnesota	1–4	San Jose		Nabokov	17,064	16–9–4	36	W
30	December 13	Vancouver	2–5	San Jose		Nabokov	17,175	17–9–4	38	W
31	December 15	Dallas	2–4	San Jose		Nabokov	17,496	17–10–4	38	L
32	December 16	San Jose	2–1	Anaheim	SO	Nabokov	17,174	18–10–4	40	W
33	December 18	Anaheim	2–0	San Jose		Nabokov	17,197	18–11–4	40	L
34	December 20	Phoenix	3–2	San Jose	SO	Nabokov	17,136	18–11–5	41	OTL
35	December 22	Anaheim	5–2	San Jose		Nabokov	17,496	18–12–5	41	L
36	December 26	San Jose	3–2	Los Angeles		Nabokov	18,118	19–12–5	43	W
37	December 28	San Jose	1–0	St. Louis		Nabokov	19,250	20–12–5	45	W
38	December 29	San Jose	5–2	Nashville		Nabokov	13,298	21–12–5	47	W
39	December 31	San Jose	3–2	Minnesota		Nabokov	18,568	22–12–5	49	W

January: 6–4–2 (home: 5–2–1; road: 1–2–1)

Game	Date	Visitor	Score	Home	OT	Decision	Attendance	Record	Points	Recap
40	January 3	Calgary	3–2	San Jose	OT	Nabokov	17,496	22–12–6	50	OTL
41	January 5	Columbus	2–3	San Jose		Nabokov	17,496	23–12–6	52	W
42	January 10	Vancouver	1–3	San Jose		Nabokov	17,496	24–12–6	54	W
43	January 12	Toronto	3–2	San Jose		Nabokov	17,496	25–12–6	56	W
44	January 13	San Jose	3–4	Anaheim	OT	Greiss	17,174	25–12–7	57	OTL
45	January 15	San Jose	3–5	Phoenix		Nabokov	11,822	25–13–7	57	L
46	January 17	Dallas	4–2	San Jose		Nabokov	17,496	25–14–7	57	L
47	January 19	Detroit	6–3	San Jose		Nabokov	17,496	25–15–7	57	L
48	January 22	Chicago	2–3	San Jose		Nabokov	17,136	26–15–7	59	W
49	January 24	St. Louis	1–4	San Jose		Nabokov	17,142	27–15–7	61	W
50	January 29	San Jose	3–0	Edmonton		Nabokov	16,839	28–15–7	63	W
51	January 30	San Jose	4–5	Calgary		Nabokov	19,289	28–16–7	63	L

February: 7–5–1 (home: 3–2–1; road: 4–3–0)

Game	Date	Visitor	Score	Home	OT	Decision	Attendance	Record	Points	Recap
52	February 2	Chicago	2–3	San Jose	SO	Nabokov	17,496	29–16–7	65	W
53	February 6	Colorado	3–1	San Jose		Nabokov	17,087	29–17–7	65	L
54	February 8	Columbus	1–2	San Jose	OT	Nabokov	17,210	30–17–7	67	W
55	February 9	Nashville	3–4	San Jose		Nabokov	17,496	31–17–7	69	W
56	February 12	Calgary	4–3	San Jose	OT	Nabokov	17,269	31–17–8	70	OTL
57	February 14	Edmonton	3–2	San Jose		Nabokov	17,496	31–18–8	70	L
58	February 17	San Jose	1–3	NY Rangers		Nabokov	18,200	31–19–8	70	L
59	February 18	San Jose	2–3	NY Islanders		Nabokov	16,234	31–20–8	70	L
60	February 20	San Jose	2–3	New Jersey		Greiss	13,855	31–21–8	70	L
61	February 21	San Jose	3–1	Philadelphia		Nabokov	19,487	32–21–8	72	W
62	February 24	San Jose	2–1	Pittsburgh	SO	Nabokov	17,132	33–21–8	74	W
63	February 27	San Jose	4–2	Columbus		Nabokov	16,029	34–21–8	76	W
64	February 29	San Jose	3–2	Detroit		Nabokov	20,066	35–21–8	78	W

March: 13–0–2 (home: 7–0–1; road: 6–0–1)

Game	Date	Visitor	Score	Home	OT	Decision	Attendance	Record	Points	Recap
65	March 1	San Jose	2–0	St. Louis		Boucher	19,150	36–21–8	80	W
66	March 3	Montreal	4–6	San Jose		Nabokov	17,496	37–21–8	82	W
67	March 5	Ottawa	2–3	San Jose	OT	Nabokov	17,496	38–21–8	84	W
68	March 7	San Jose	3–2	Chicago		Nabokov	21,908	39–21–8	86	W
69	March 9	San Jose	3–2	Minnesota	SO	Nabokov	18,568	40–21–8	88	W
70	March 11	San Jose	2–1	Nashville		Nabokov	14,965	41–21–8	90	W
71	March 14	St. Louis	1–4	San Jose		Nabokov	17,496	42–21–8	92	W
72	March 16	Edmonton	2–1	San Jose	SO	Nabokov	17,496	42–21–9	93	OTL
73	March 18	San Jose	2–1	Los Angeles		Boucher	16,784	43–21–9	95	W
74	March 19	Minnesota	3–4	San Jose	SO	Nabokov	17,496	44–21–9	97	W
75	March 21	Anaheim	1–2	San Jose		Nabokov	17,496	45–21–9	99	W
76	March 25	San Jose	4–5	Phoenix	OT	Boucher	15,991	45–21–10	100	OTL
77	March 27	Dallas	2–3	San Jose	OT	Nabokov	17,496	46–21–10	102	W
78	March 28	San Jose	3–1	Anaheim		Boucher	17,334	47–21–10	104	W
79	March 30	Phoenix	1–3	San Jose		Nabokov	17,496	48–21–10	106	W

April: 1–2–0 (home: 1–0–0; road: 0–2–0)

Game	Date	Visitor	Score	Home	OT	Decision	Attendance	Record	Points	Recap
80	April 1	Los Angeles	2–5	San Jose		Nabokov	17,496	49–21–10	108	W
81	April 3	San Jose	2–4	Los Angeles		Nabokov	17,759	49–22–10	108	L
82	April 6	San Jose	2–4	Dallas		Boucher	18,532	49–23–10	108	L

Legend: W Win (2 points) L Loss (0 points) OTL Overtime/shootout loss (1 point)

=== Playoffs ===
2008 Stanley Cup playoffs
Western Conference Quarterfinals vs. (7) Calgary Flames – Sharks win 4–3

Game	Date	Visitor	Score	Home	OT	Decision	Attendance	Series	Recap
1	April 9	Calgary	3–2	San Jose		Nabokov	17,496	0–1	L
2	April 10	Calgary	0–2	San Jose		Nabokov	17,496	1–1	W
3	April 13	San Jose	3–4	Calgary		Nabokov	19,289	1–2	L
4	April 15	San Jose	3–2	Calgary		Nabokov	19,289	2–2	W
5	April 17	Calgary	3–4	San Jose		Nabokov	17,496	3–2	W
6	April 20	San Jose	0–2	Calgary		Nabokov	19,289	3–3	L
7	April 22	Calgary	3–5	San Jose		Nabokov	17,496	4–3	W

Western Conference Semifinals vs. (5) Dallas Stars – Stars win 4–2

Game	Date	Visitor	Score	Home	OT	Decision	Attendance	Series	Recap
1	April 25	Dallas	3–2	San Jose	OT	Nabokov	17,496	0–1	L
2	April 27	Dallas	5–2	San Jose		Nabokov	17,496	0–2	L
3	April 29	San Jose	1–2	Dallas	OT	Nabokov	18,532	0–3	L
4	April 30	San Jose	2–1	Dallas		Nabokov	18,584	1–3	W
5	May 2	Dallas	2–3	San Jose	OT	Nabokov	17,496	2–3	W
6	May 4	San Jose	1–2	Dallas	4OT	Nabokov	18,584	2–4	L

Legend: W Win L Loss

== Player statistics ==
=== Regular season ===
==== Skaters ====
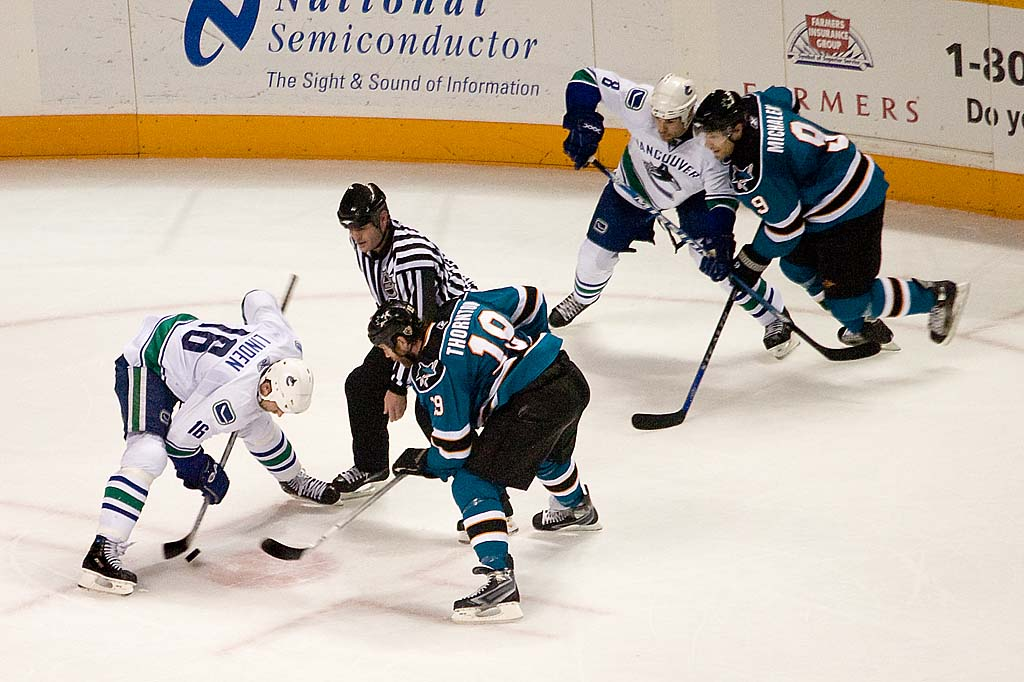
Joe Thornton facing off in a game versus the Vancouver Canucks.

Note: GP = Games played; G = Goals; A = Assists; Pts = Points; +/- = Plus/minus; PIM = Penalty minutes

Player	GP	G	A	Pts	+/-	PIM
Joe Thornton	82	29	67	96	18	59
Brian Campbell	83	8	54	62	8	20
Milan Michalek	79	24	31	55	19	47
Patrick Marleau	78	19	29	48	−19	33
Joe Pavelski	82	19	21	40	1	28
Jonathan Cheechoo	69	23	14	37	11	46
Craig Rivet	74	5	30	35	3	104
Jeremy Roenick	69	14	19	33	−8	26
Christian Ehrhoff	77	1	21	22	9	72
Mike Grier	78	9	13	22	−8	24
Torrey Mitchell	82	10	10	20	−3	50
Patrick Rissmiller	79	8	9	17	−8	30
Devin Setoguchi	44	11	6	17	6	8
Sandis Ozolinsh	39	3	13	16	−11	24
Matt Carle	62	2	13	15	−8	26
Marc-Edouard Vlasic	82	2	12	14	−12	24
Kyle McLaren	61	3	8	11	3	84
Douglas Murray	66	1	9	10	20	98
Curtis Brown	33	5	4	9	4	10
Ryane Clowe	15	3	5	8	−1	22
Marcel Goc	51	5	3	8	−15	12
Jody Shelley	62	1	6	7	−4	135
Alexei Semenov	22	1	3	4	−8	36
Tomas Plihal	22	2	1	3	4	4
Tom Cavanagh	1	0	1	1	1	0
Lukas Kaspar	3	0	0	0	−2	0
Mike Iggulden	1	0	0	0	−1	0

==== Goaltenders ====
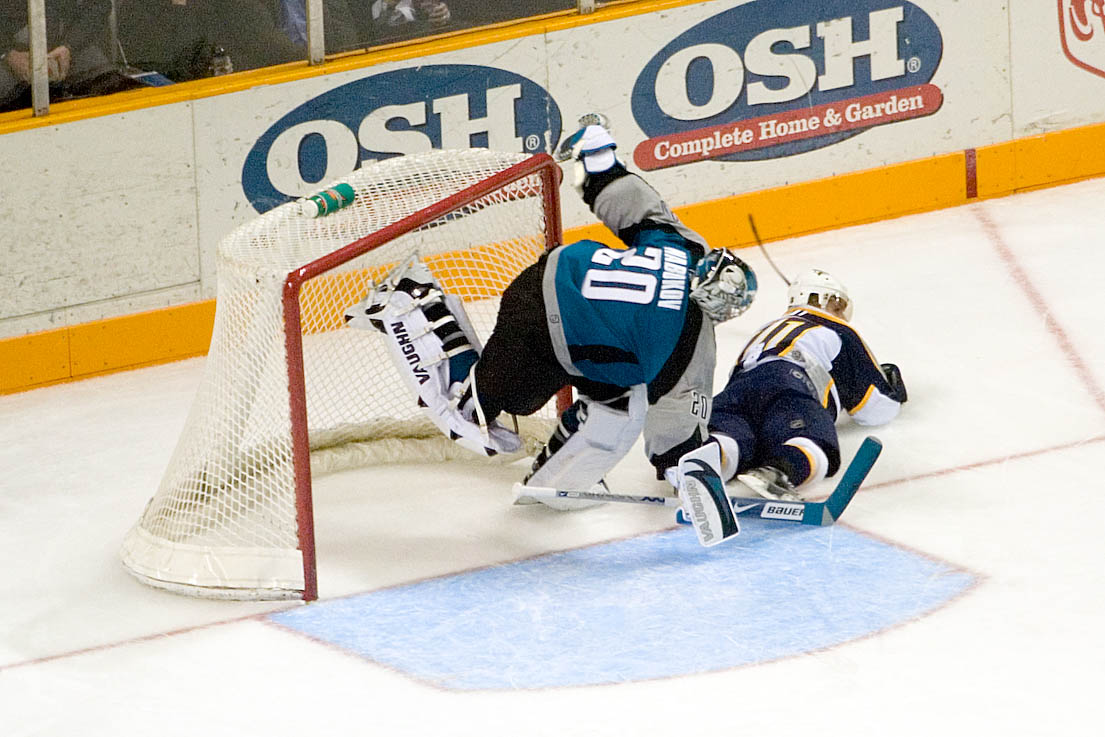
Evgeni Nabokov is crashed into by Martin Erat during a game versus the Nashville Predators.

Note: GP = Games played; TOI = Time on ice (minutes); W = Wins; L = Losses; OT = Overtime/shootout losses; GA = Goals against; SO = Shutouts; Sv% = Save percentage; GAA = Goals against average

Player	GP	TOI	W	L	OT	GA	SO	Sv%	GAA
Evgeni Nabokov	77	4561	46	21	8	163	6	0.910	2.14
Brian Boucher	5	238	3	1	1	7	1	0.932	1.76
Thomas Greiss	3	129	0	1	1	7	0	0.860	3.26
Dimitri Patzold	3	44	0	0	0	4	0	0.800	5.45

=== Playoffs ===
==== Skaters ====
Note: GP = Games played; G = Goals; A = Assists; Pts = Points; +/- = Plus/minus; PIM = Penalty minutes

Player	GP	G	A	Pts	+/-	PIM
Joe Thornton	13	2	8	10	3	2
Ryane Clowe	13	5	4	9	−2	12
Joe Pavelski	13	5	4	9	3	0
Patrick Marleau	13	4	4	8	−2	2
Jonathan Cheechoo	13	4	4	8	3	4
Brian Campbell	13	1	6	7	3	4
Craig Rivet	13	0	6	6	2	16
Jeremy Roenick	13	2	3	5	0	2
Christian Ehrhoff	10	0	5	5	1	14
Milan Michalek	13	4	0	4	5	4
Torrey Mitchell	13	1	2	3	−2	10
Douglas Murray	13	1	1	2	0	2
Devin Setoguchi	9	1	1	2	−2	2
Mike Grier	13	0	1	1	−2	2
Matt Carle	11	0	1	1	0	4
Marc-Edouard Vlasic	13	0	1	1	−2	0
Curtis Brown	7	0	0	0	−2	4
Kyle McLaren	5	0	0	0	−2	4
Jody Shelley	6	0	0	0	−1	2
Alexei Semenov	2	0	0	0	0	2
Marcel Goc	4	0	0	0	1	2
Tomas Plihal	4	0	0	0	1	0
Patrick Rissmiller	8	0	0	0	−3	4

==== Goaltenders ====
Note: GP = Games played; TOI = Time on ice (minutes); W = Wins; L = Losses; GA = Goals against; SO = Shutouts; Sv% = Save percentage; GAA = Goals against average

Player	GP	TOI	W	L	GA	SO	Sv%	GAA
Evgeni Nabokov	13	853	6	7	31	1	0.907	2.18
Brian Boucher	1	2	0	0	0	0	0.000	0.00

== Awards and records ==
The Sharks did not win any awards during the 2007–2008 NHL season.

=== Records ===
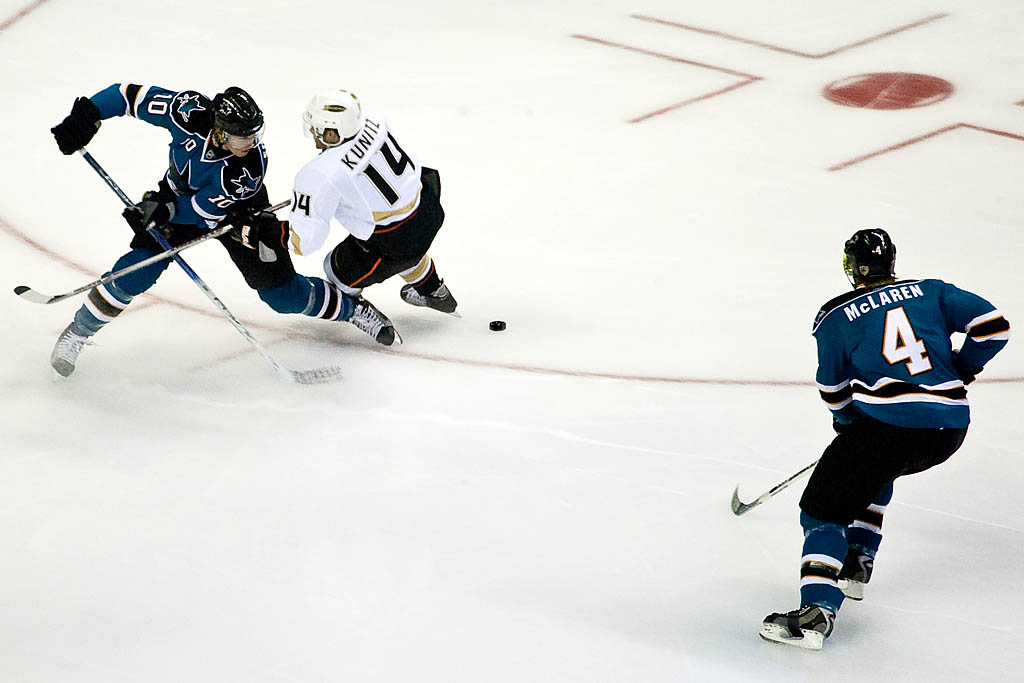
Christian Ehrhoff and Chris Kunitz during a pre-season game.

- Longest winning steak: 11 games
- Most PIM, single regulation game: Jody Shelley, 41
- Most points, single playoff game: Jeremy Roenick, 4
- Most games played: Evgeni Nabokov, 77
- Most goaltending wins: Evgeni Nabokov, 46
- Most consecutive starts: Evgeni Nabokov, 43

=== Milestones ===
- Jeremy Roenick played his 1,300th game.
- Ron Wilson won his 500th game as a coach.

== Transactions ==
The Sharks were involved in the following transactions during the 2007–08 season.

=== Trades ===
June 22, 2007	To Toronto Maple Leafs Vesa Toskala; Mark Bell	To San Jose Sharks 1st-round pick in 2007 – Lars Eller; 2nd-round pick in 2007 – Aaron Palushaj; 4th-round pick in 2009 – Craig Smith
January 29, 2008	To Columbus Blue Jackets 6th-round pick in 2009 – David Pacan	To San Jose Sharks Jody Shelley
February 7, 2008	To Carolina Hurricanes Future considerations	To San Jose Sharks J. D. Forrest
February 26, 2008	To Buffalo Sabres Steve Bernier; 1st-round pick in 2008 – Tyler Ennis	To San Jose Sharks Brian Campbell; 7th-round pick in 2008 – Drew Daniels
February 26, 2008	To New York Islanders Rob Davison	To San Jose Sharks 7th-round pick in 2008 – Jason Demers

=== Free agents signed ===
Player	Former team
Alexei Semenov	Florida Panthers
Jeremy Roenick	Phoenix Coyotes
Sandis Ozolinsh	New York Rangers
Brian Boucher	Columbus Blue Jackets

=== Free agents lost ===
Player	New team
Scott Hannan	Colorado Avalanche
Mathieu Darche	Tampa Bay Lightning
Bill Guerin	New York Islanders

== Draft picks ==
San Jose's picks at the 2007 NHL entry draft in Columbus, Ohio.

Round	#	Player	Position	Nationality	College/Junior/Club team (League)
1	9	Logan Couture	Center	Canada	Ottawa 67's (OHL)
1	28	Nick Petrecki	Defender	United States	Omaha Lancers (USHL)
3	83	Timo Pielmeier	Goaltender	Germany	Kölner Haie (DEL)
3	91	Tyson Sexsmith	Goaltender	Canada	Vancouver Giants (WHL)
6	165	Patrik Zackrisson	Left wing	Sweden	Rögle BK (HockeyAllsvenskan)
6	173	Nick Bonino	Center	Canada	Avon Old Farms (USHS-CT)
7	201	Justin Braun	Defender	United States	University of Massachusetts Amherst (Hockey East)
7	203	Frazer McLaren	Left wing	Canada	Portland Winterhawks (WHL)

== Farm teams ==
=== Worcester Sharks ===
The Worcester Sharks were the San Jose Sharks' American Hockey League affiliate.

=== Phoenix RoadRunners ===
The Phoenix RoadRunners were the Sharks affiliate in the ECHL.

== See also ==
- 2007–08 NHL season
