= 2007–08 Dallas Stars season =

National Hockey League team season

2007–08 Dallas Stars
- Division: 3rd Pacific
- Conference: 5th Western
- 2007–08 record: 45–30–7
- Home record: 23–16–2
- Road record: 22–14–5
- Goals for: 242
- Goals against: 207

Team information
- General manager: Doug Armstrong (Oct.–Nov.); Brett Hull (Nov.–Apr.) (interim) and Les Jackson (Nov.–Apr.) (interim)
- Coach: Dave Tippett
- Captain: Brenden Morrow
- Alternate captains: Mike Modano; Sergei Zubov
- Arena: American Airlines Center
- Average attendance: 18,039 (97.3%)

Team leaders
- Goals: Brenden Morrow (32)
- Assists: Mike Ribeiro (56)
- Points: Mike Ribeiro (83)
- Penalty minutes: Steve Ott (147)
- Plus/minus: Brenden Morrow (+23)
- Wins: Marty Turco (32)
- Goals against average: Marty Turco (2.32)

The 2007–08 Dallas Stars season began on October 3, 2007 and was the franchise's 41st season in the National Hockey League (NHL) and its 15th as the Dallas Stars. The Stars made the Western Conference Finals but failed to represent the Conference in the 2008 Stanley Cup Finals after being defeated by the Detroit Red Wings.

Key dates prior to the start of the season:

- The 2007 NHL entry draft took place in Columbus, Ohio, on June 22–23.
- The free agency period began on July 1.

== Regular season ==
=== Divisional standings ===
Pacific Division
		GP	W	L	OTL	GF	GA	Pts
**1**	**y – San Jose Sharks**	**82**	**49**	**23**	**10**	**222**	**193**	**108**
**2**	**Anaheim Ducks**	**82**	**47**	**27**	**8**	**205**	**191**	**102**
**3**	**Dallas Stars**	**82**	**45**	**30**	**7**	**242**	**207**	**97**
4	Phoenix Coyotes	82	38	37	7	214	231	83
5	Los Angeles Kings	82	32	43	7	231	266	71

=== Conference standings ===
Western Conference
R		Div	GP	W	L	OTL	GF	GA	Pts
**1**	**p – Detroit Red Wings**	**CE**	**82**	**54**	**21**	**7**	**257**	**184**	115
**2**	**y – San Jose Sharks**	**PA**	**82**	**49**	**23**	**10**	**222**	**193**	108
**3**	**y – Minnesota Wild**	**NW**	**82**	**44**	**28**	**10**	**223**	**218**	98
**4**	**Anaheim Ducks**	**PA**	**82**	**47**	**27**	**8**	**205**	**191**	102
**5**	**Dallas Stars**	**PA**	**82**	**45**	**30**	**7**	**242**	**207**	97
**6**	**Colorado Avalanche**	**NW**	**82**	**44**	**31**	**7**	**231**	**219**	95
**7**	**Calgary Flames**	**NW**	**82**	**42**	**30**	**10**	**229**	**227**	94
**8**	**Nashville Predators**	**CE**	**82**	**41**	**32**	**9**	**230**	**229**	91
8.5
9	Edmonton Oilers	NW	82	41	35	6	235	251	88
10	Chicago Blackhawks	CE	82	40	34	8	239	235	88
11	Vancouver Canucks	NW	82	39	33	10	213	215	88
12	Phoenix Coyotes	PA	82	38	37	7	214	231	83
13	Columbus Blue Jackets	CE	82	34	36	12	193	218	80
14	St. Louis Blues	CE	82	33	36	13	205	237	79
15	Los Angeles Kings	PA	82	32	43	7	231	266	71

Divisions: PA – Pacific, CE – Central, NW – Northwest
bold – qualified for playoffs, y – division winner, p – Presidents' Trophy winner

== Schedule and results ==
=== Regular season ===
2007–08 regular season
October: 5–5–2 (home: 3–2–1; road: 2–3–1)

Game	Date	Visitor	Score	Home	OT	Decision	Attendance	Record	Points	Recap
1	October 3	Dallas	3 – 4	Colorado		Turco	17,487	0–1–0	0	L
2	October 5	Boston	1 – 4	Dallas		Turco	18,532	1–1–0	2	W
3	October 6	Dallas	1 – 5	Nashville		Smith	13,079	1–2–0	2	L
4	October 10	Los Angeles	1 – 5	Dallas		Turco	16,129	2–2–0	4	W
5	October 12	Calgary	3 – 2	Dallas	OT	Turco	17,132	2–2–1	5	OTL
6	October 13	Dallas	1 – 2	Chicago	OT	Stephan	11,868	2–2–2	6	OTL
7	October 17	Dallas	3 – 2	Columbus	OT	Smith	11,820	3–2–2	8	W
8	October 20	Anaheim	1 – 3	Dallas		Turco	18,057	4–2–2	10	W
9	October 25	Dallas	1 – 2	Los Angeles		Turco	14,559	4–3–2	10	L
10	October 27	Dallas	5 – 3	Phoenix		Smith	13,741	5–3–2	12	W
11	October 29	San Jose	4 – 2	Dallas		Turco	17,546	5–4–2	12	L
12	October 31	Chicago	5 – 4	Dallas		Smith	14,756	5–5–2	12	L

November: 8–4–2 (home: 4–1–1; road: 4–3–1)

Game	Date	Visitor	Score	Home	OT	Decision	Attendance	Record	Points	Recap
13	November 2	Phoenix	5 – 0	Dallas		Smith	18,203	5–6–2	12	L
14	November 5	Dallas	5 – 0	Anaheim		Turco	17,174	6–6–2	14	W
15	November 7	Dallas	3 – 1	San Jose		Turco	17,496	7–6–2	16	W
16	November 8	Dallas	2 – 5	Phoenix		Turco	12,027	7–7–2	16	L
17	November 10	Dallas	5 – 6	Los Angeles	OT	Turco	18,118	7–7–3	17	OTL
18	November 14	San Jose	4 – 3	Dallas	SO	Turco	17,682	7–7–4	18	OTL
19	November 16	Colorado	1 – 6	Dallas		Smith	18,019	8–7–4	20	W
20	November 19	Los Angeles	0 – 3	Dallas		Smith	17,208	9–7–4	22	W
21	November 21	Anaheim	1 – 2	Dallas		Smith	18,584	10–7–4	24	W
22	November 23	Toronto	1 – 3	Dallas		Turco	18,409	11–7–4	26	W
23	November 25	Dallas	3 – 2	NY Rangers		Smith	18,200	12–7–4	28	W
24	November 26	Dallas	3 – 2	NY Islanders	OT	Turco	8,161	13–7–4	30	W
25	November 28	Dallas	2 – 4	New Jersey		Turco	13,665	13–8–4	30	L
26	November 30	Dallas	1 – 4	Pittsburgh		Smith	17,132	13–9–4	30	L

December: 10–4–0 (home: 5–3–0; road: 5–1–0)

Game	Date	Visitor	Score	Home	OT	Decision	Attendance	Record	Points	Recap
27	December 1	Dallas	4–1	Philadelphia		Turco	19,660	14–9–4	32	W
28	December 3	Dallas	2–1	Columbus	SO	Turco	12,233	15–9–4	34	W
29	December 5	San Jose	3–2	Dallas		Turco	17,318	15–10–4	34	L
30	December 7	Ottawa	4–2	Dallas		Smith	18,016	15–11–4	34	L
31	December 10	Edmonton	4–5	Dallas		Turco	17,833	16–11–4	36	W
32	December 13	Los Angeles	1–4	Dallas		Turco	17,913	17–11–4	38	W
33	December 15	Dallas	4–2	San Jose		Turco	17,496	18–11–4	40	W
34	December 18	Dallas	2–1	Edmonton	SO	Turco	16,839	19–11–4	42	W
35	December 20	Dallas	2–3	Vancouver		Turco	18,630	19–12–4	42	L
36	December 21	Dallas	3–2	Calgary	OT	Smith	19,289	20–12–4	44	W
37	December 23	Montreal	1–4	Dallas		Turco	18,585	21–12–4	46	W
38	December 26	Minnesota	3–8	Dallas		Turco	18,532	22–12–4	48	W
39	December 29	St. Louis	4 – 5	Dallas	SO	Smith	18,532	23–12–4	50	W
40	December 31	Nashville	1–0	Dallas		Turco	18,584	23–13–4	50	L

January: 5–7–1 (home: 3–3–0; road: 2–4–1)

Game	Date	Visitor	Score	Home	OT	Decision	Attendance	Record	Points	Recap
41	January 2	Dallas	1 – 4	Detroit		Turco	20,066	23–14–4	50	L
42	January 3	Dallas	3 – 6	Minnesota		Smith	18,568	23–15–4	50	L
43	January 5	Detroit	3 – 0	Dallas		Smith	18,584	23–16–4	50	L
44	January 7	Minnesota	1 – 3	Dallas		Turco	17,502	24–16–4	52	W
45	January 9	Dallas	3 – 1	Chicago		Turco	15,469	25–16–4	54	W
46	January 10	Dallas	2 – 4	St. Louis		Smith	16,805	25–17–4	54	L
47	January 12	Dallas	3 – 4	Los Angeles	SO	Turco	16,916	25–17–5	55	OTL
48	January 15	Dallas	2 – 4	Anaheim		Turco	17,174	25–18–5	55	L
49	January 17	Dallas	4 – 2	San Jose		Turco	17,496	26–18–5	57	W
50	January 19	Columbus	1 – 3	Dallas		Smith	17,811	27–18–5	59	W
51	January 20	Anaheim	2 – 5	Dallas		Turco	18,461	28–18–5	61	W
52	January 22	Columbus	4 – 2	Dallas		Smith	17,087	28–19–5	61	L
53	January 24	Buffalo	2 – 1	Dallas		Turco	18,532	28–20–5	61	L
54	January 29	Dallas	4 – 3	Vancouver		Turco	18,630	29–20–5	63	W

February: 12–2–0 (home: 6–1–0; road: 6–1–0)

Game	Date	Visitor	Score	Home	OT	Decision	Attendance	Record	Points	Recap
55	February 1	Dallas	4 – 1	Edmonton		Turco	16,839	30–20–5	65	W
56	February 2	Dallas	2 – 1	Calgary		Turco	19,289	31–20–5	67	W
57	February 5	Vancouver	2 – 3	Dallas	SO	Turco	17,642	32–20–5	69	W
58	February 7	Dallas	1 – 0	Minnesota		Smith	18,568	33–20–5	71	W
59	February 9	St. Louis	2 – 6	Dallas		Smith	18,584	34–20–5	73	W
60	February 11	Phoenix	1 – 2	Dallas		Turco	17,622	35–20–5	75	W
61	February 14	Dallas	2 – 5	Phoenix		Turco	12,885	35–21–5	75	L
62	February 15	Dallas	4 – 2	Anaheim		Turco	17,323	36–21–5	77	W
63	February 17	Detroit	0 – 1	Dallas		Turco	18,584	37–21–5	79	W
64	February 20	Calgary	3 – 2	Dallas		Turco	18,584	37–22–5	79	L
65	February 22	Edmonton	2 – 5	Dallas		Turco	18,564	38–22–5	81	W
66	February 23	Dallas	6 – 2	Nashville		Smith	17,113	39–22–5	83	W
67	February 26	Dallas	3 – 1	St. Louis		Turco	19,150	40–22–5	85	W
68	February 28	Chicago	4 – 7	Dallas		Turco	18,584	41–22–5	87	W

March: 2–7–2 (home: 1–5–0; road: 1–2–2)

Game	Date	Visitor	Score	Home	OT	Decision	Attendance	Record	Points	Recap
69	March 1	Nashville	3 – 1	Dallas		Turco	18,584	41–23–5	87	L
70	March 5	Phoenix	2 – 1	Dallas		Turco	17,942	41–24–5	87	L
71	March 8	Dallas	1 – 3	Colorado		Turco	18,007	41–25–5	87	L
72	March 9	Colorado	0 – 3	Dallas		Turco	18,532	42–25–5	89	W
73	March 13	Dallas	3 – 5	Detroit		Turco	19,453	42–26–5	89	L
74	March 15	Vancouver	3 – 4	Dallas		Holmqvist	18,584	42–27–5	89	L
75	March 19	Anaheim	1 – 2	Dallas		Turco	18,584	42–28–5	89	L
76	March 22	Los Angeles	4 – 2	Dallas		Turco	18,532	42–29–5	89	L
77	March 27	Dallas	2 – 3	San Jose	OT	Turco	17,496	42–29–6	90	OTL
78	March 29	Dallas	7 – 2	Los Angeles		Turco	17,849	43–29–6	92	W
79	March 30	Dallas	2 – 3	Anaheim	SO	Turco	17,174	43–29–7	93	OTL

April: 2–1–0 (home: 2–0–0; road: 0–1–0)

Game	Date	Visitor	Score	Home	OT	Decision	Attendance	Record	Points	Recap
80	April 3	Dallas	2 – 4	Phoenix		Holmqvist	18,340	43–30–7	95	L
81	April 4	Phoenix	2 – 4	Dallas		Holmqvist	18,584	44–30–7	95	W
82	April 6	San Jose	2 – 4	Dallas		Turco	18,532	45–30–7	97	W

Legend: W Win (2 points) L Loss (0 points) OTL Overtime/shootout loss (1 point)

=== Playoffs ===
2008 Stanley Cup playoffs
Western Conference Quarterfinals vs. (4) Anaheim Ducks – Stars win 4–2

Game	Date	Visitor	Score	Home	Decision	Attendance	Series	Recap
1	April 10	Dallas	4 – 0	Anaheim	Turco	17,191	Stars lead 1–0	W
2	April 12	Dallas	5 – 2	Anaheim	Turco	17,181	Stars lead 2–0	W
3	April 15	Anaheim	4 – 2	Dallas	Turco	18,532	Stars lead 2–1	L
4	April 17	Anaheim	1 – 3	Dallas	Turco	18,532	Stars lead 3–1	W
5	April 18	Dallas	2 – 5	Anaheim	Turco	17,199	Stars lead 3–2	L
6	April 20	Anaheim	1 – 4	Dallas	Turco	18,532	Stars win 4–2	W

Western Conference Semifinals vs. (2) San Jose Sharks – Stars win 4–2

Game	Date	Visitor	Score	Home	Decision	Attendance	Series	Recap
1	April 25	Dallas	3 – 2 (OT)	San Jose	Turco	17,496	Stars lead 1–0	W
2	April 27	Dallas	5 – 2	San Jose	Turco	17,496	Stars lead 2–0	W
3	April 29	San Jose	1 – 2 (OT)	Dallas	Turco	18,532	Stars lead 3–0	W
4	April 30	San Jose	2 – 1	Dallas	Turco	18,584	Stars lead 3–1	L
5	May 2	Dallas	2 – 3 (OT)	San Jose	Turco	17,496	Stars lead 3–2	L
6	May 4	San Jose	1 – 2 (4OT)	Dallas	Turco	18,584	Stars win 4–2	W

Western Conference Finals vs. (1) Detroit Red Wings – Red Wings win 4–2

Game	Date	Visitor	Score	Home	Decision	Attendance	Series	Recap
1	May 8	Dallas	1 – 4	Detroit	Turco	20,066	Red Wings lead 1–0	L
2	May 10	Dallas	1 – 2	Detroit	Turco	20,066	Red Wings lead 2–0	L
3	May 12	Detroit	5 – 2	Dallas	Turco	18,532	Red Wings lead 3–0	L
4	May 14	Detroit	1 – 3	Dallas	Turco	18,532	Red Wings lead 3–1	W
5	May 17	Dallas	2 – 1	Detroit	Turco	20,066	Red Wings lead 3–2	W
6	May 19	Detroit	4 – 1	Dallas	Turco	18,584	Red Wings win 4–2	L

Legend: W Win L Loss

== Player statistics ==
=== Regular season ===
==== Skaters ====
Note: GP = Games played; G = Goals; A = Assists; Pts = Points; +/- = Plus/minus; PIM = Penalty minutes; ATOI = Average time on ice

Player	GP	G	A	Pts	+/–	PIM
Mike Ribeiro	76	27	56	83	21	46
Brenden Morrow	82	32	42	74	23	105
†-Brad Richards	74	20	42	62	-25	15
Mike Modano	82	21	36	57	-11	48
Niklas Hagman	82	27	14	41	4	51
Jere Lehtinen	48	15	22	37	9	14
Sergei Zubov	46	4	31	35	6	12
Antti Miettinen	69	15	19	34	4	34
Loui Eriksson	65	14	17	31	5	28
Jussi Jokinen	52	14	14	28	2	14
Stephane Robidas	82	9	17	26	0	85
Matt Niskanen	78	7	19	26	22	36
Jeff Halpern	64	8	12	20	-2	40
Trevor Daley	78	5	19	24	-1	85
Stu Barnes	79	12	11	23	-3	26
Steve Ott	73	11	11	22	2	147
Philippe Boucher	38	2	12	14	3	26
Joel Lundqvist	55	3	11	14	-3	22
Mattias Norstrom	66	2	11	13	3	40
Nicklas Grossmann	62	0	7	7	10	22
Chris Conner	22	3	2	5	0	6
Krys Barch	48	1	2	3	-3	105
Brad Winchester	41	1	2	3	-9	46
Mark Fistric	37	0	2	2	3	24
Toby Petersen	8	0	3	3	0	4
B. J. Crombeen	8	0	2	2	1	39
Todd Fedoruk	11	0	2	2	2	33
Dan Jancevski	4	0	0	0	-1	2

† denotes: Acquired from Tampa Bay in a trade on February 26, 2008

==== Goaltenders ====
GP = Games played; TOI = Time on ice (minutes:seconds); W = Wins; L = Losses; SA = Shots against; GA = Goals against; SO = Shutouts; SV% = Save percentage; GAA = Goals against average

Player	GP	TOI	W	L	SA	GA	SO	SV%	GAA
Marty Turco	62	3627:31	32	21	1543	140	3	.909	2.32
Mike Smith	21	238:28	12	9	88	7	1	.920	1.76
†Johan Holmqvist	2	79:59	1	0	35	5	0	.857	3.75
Tobias Stephan	1	60:38	0	0	40	2	0	.950	1.98

† denotes: Acquired from Tampa Bay in a trade on February 26, 2008
Italics denotes: Traded to Tampa Bay in a trade on February 26, 2008

=== Playoffs ===
==== Skaters ====
Player	GP	G	A	Pts	+/–	PIM	ATOI
Mike Ribeiro	18	3	14	17	0	16	21:47
Brenden Morrow	18	9	6	15	0	22	23:13
Brad Richards	18	3	12	15	1	8	21:00
Mike Modano	18	5	7	12	-3	22	19:55
Stephane Robidas	18	3	8	11	0	12	25:47
Jere Lehtinen	14	4	4	8	1	2	20:34
Loui Eriksson	18	4	4	8	1	8	18:22
Sergei Zubov	11	1	5	6	-4	4	25:43
Joel Lundqvist	16	2	5	7	0	8	13:44
Mattias Norstrom	18	2	3	5	5	16	20:33
Steve Ott	18	2	1	3	-2	22	13:34
Matt Niskanen	16	0	3	3	-2	10	17:01
Stu Barnes	9	2	1	3	1	2	15:33
Nicklas Grossmann	18	1	1	2	3	6	18:41
Niklas Hagman	18	2	0	2	3	14	13:23
Antti Miettinen	15	1	1	2	-2	0	10:01
Trevor Daley	18	1	0	0	0	20	19:15
Toby Petersen	16	0	0	0	-4	2	08:37
Mark Fistric	9	0	0	0	-1	6	14:51
B. J. Crombeen	5	0	0	0	E	0	04:16
Philippe Boucher	3	0	0	0	E	4	20:04
Krys Barch	1	0	0	0	E	0	01:56
Chris Conner	1	0	0	0	-1	0	04:17
Brad Winchester	6	0	0	0	-2	8	

==== Goaltenders ====
GP = Games played; TOI = Time on ice (minutes:seconds); W = Wins; L = Losses; SA = Shots against; GA = Goals against; SO = Shutouts; SV% = Save percentage; GAA = Goals against average

Player	GP	TOI	W	L	SA	GA	SO	SV%	GAA
Marty Turco	18	1152	10	8	511	40	1	.922	2.08

== Awards and records ==
=== Milestones ===
- On November 7, Mike Modano surpassed Phil Housley's record for most points (1,232) by an American-born player, scoring two goals against the San Jose Sharks.
- Dallas' 2–1 win over Phoenix on February 11 was a franchise-record seventh-straight win.
- Dallas' 2–1 quadruple overtime victory over San Jose in Game 6 of the Western Conference Semifinals was the eighth-longest game in NHL history. It was the third time in five years Dallas played in a game that reached the fourth overtime.

== Transactions ==
The Stars have been involved in the following transactions during the 2007–08 season.

=== Trades ===
June 23, 2007	To Columbus Blue Jackets 4th-round pick (94th overall) in 2007 – Maxim Mayorov	To Dallas Stars 5th-round pick (128th overall) in 2007 – Austin Smith; 5th-round pick (129th overall) in 2007 – Jamie Benn; 5th-round pick (149th overall) in 2007 – Michael Neal
February 26, 2008	To Dallas Stars Brad Richards; Johan Holmqvist	To Tampa Bay Lightning Mike Smith; Jussi Jokinen; Jeff Halpern

=== Free agents acquired ===
Player	Former team	Contract Terms
Toby Petersen	Edmonton Oilers	1 year, $500,000
Brad Winchester	Edmonton Oilers	1 year, $475,000
Todd Fedoruk	Philadelphia Flyers	1 year, $875,000
Trevor Byrne	Washington Capitals	1 year, $450,000

=== Free agents lost ===
Player	New team
Darryl Sydor	Pittsburgh Penguins
Ladislav Nagy	Los Angeles Kings
Dan Ellis	Nashville Predators
Jon Klemm	Los Angeles Kings

== Draft picks ==
Dallas' picks at the 2007 NHL entry draft in Columbus, Ohio. The Stars do not have a first round pick, having dealt it to the Phoenix Coyotes as part of the Ladislav Nagy trade.

Round	#	Player	Position	Nationality	College/Junior/Club team (League)
2	50	Nico Sacchetti	Centre	United States	Virginia High School (USHS-MN)
3	64	Sergei Korostin	Right wing	Russia	Dynamo Moscow (RSL)
4	112	Colton Sceviour	Right wing	Canada	Portland Winterhawks (WHL)
5	128	Austin Smith	Right wing	United States	The Gunnery (USHS-CT)
5	129	Jamie Benn	Left wing	Canada	Victoria Grizzlies (BCHL)
5	136	Ondrej Roman	Left wing	Czech Republic	Spokane Chiefs (WHL)
4	112	Michael Neal	Left wing	Canada	Belleville Bulls (OHL)
5	128	Luke Gazdic	Left wing	Canada	Erie Otters (OHL)

== Farm teams ==
=== Iowa Stars ===
The Iowa Stars are the Stars American Hockey League affiliate in 2007–08.

=== Idaho Steelheads ===
The Idaho Steelheads are the Stars affiliate in the ECHL.

== See also ==
- 2007–08 NHL season
