= 2007–08 Minnesota Wild season =

National Hockey League team season

2007–08 Minnesota Wild
- Northwest Division champions
- Division: 1st Northwest
- Conference: 3rd Western
- 2007–08 record: 44–28–10
- Home record: 25–11–5
- Road record: 19–17–5
- Goals for: 223
- Goals against: 218

Team information
- General manager: Doug Risebrough
- Coach: Jacques Lemaire
- Captain: Rotating; Pavol Demitra (Oct.); Brian Rolston (Nov.); Mark Parrish (Dec.); Nick Schultz (Jan.–Feb.); Marian Gaborik (Mar.–Apr.)
- Alternate captains: Rotating; Brian Rolston (Oct., Dec.–Apr.); Wes Walz (Oct.–Nov.); Mikko Koivu (Nov., Jan., Mar.–Apr.); Nick Schultz (Dec.); Kim Johnsson (Jan., Feb.)
- Arena: Xcel Energy Center
- Average attendance: 18,568 (102.8%)

Team leaders
- Goals: Marian Gaborik (42)
- Assists: Pierre-Marc Bouchard (50)
- Points: Marian Gaborik (83)
- Penalty minutes: Aaron Voros (141)
- Plus/minus: Marian Gaborik (+17)
- Wins: Niklas Backstrom (33)
- Goals against average: Niklas Backstrom (2.31)

The 2007–08 Minnesota Wild season began October 4, 2007. It was the Wild's eighth season in the National Hockey League (NHL). They won their first Northwest Division title this season.

Key dates prior to the start of the season:

- The 2007 NHL entry draft took place in Columbus, Ohio, on June 22–23
- The free agency period began on July 1.

== Regular season ==
=== Divisional standings ===
Northwest Division
		GP	W	L	OTL	GF	GA	Pts
**1**	**y – Minnesota Wild**	**82**	**44**	**28**	**10**	**223**	**218**	**98**
**2**	**Colorado Avalanche**	**82**	**44**	**31**	**7**	**231**	**219**	**95**
**3**	**Calgary Flames**	**82**	**42**	**30**	**10**	**229**	**227**	**94**
4	Edmonton Oilers	82	41	35	6	235	251	88
5	Vancouver Canucks	82	39	33	10	213	215	88

=== Conference standings ===
Western Conference
R		Div	GP	W	L	OTL	GF	GA	Pts
**1**	**p – Detroit Red Wings**	**CE**	**82**	**54**	**21**	**7**	**257**	**184**	115
**2**	**y – San Jose Sharks**	**PA**	**82**	**49**	**23**	**10**	**222**	**193**	108
**3**	**y – Minnesota Wild**	**NW**	**82**	**44**	**28**	**10**	**223**	**218**	98
**4**	**Anaheim Ducks**	**PA**	**82**	**47**	**27**	**8**	**205**	**191**	102
**5**	**Dallas Stars**	**PA**	**82**	**45**	**30**	**7**	**242**	**207**	97
**6**	**Colorado Avalanche**	**NW**	**82**	**44**	**31**	**7**	**231**	**219**	95
**7**	**Calgary Flames**	**NW**	**82**	**42**	**30**	**10**	**229**	**227**	94
**8**	**Nashville Predators**	**CE**	**82**	**41**	**32**	**9**	**230**	**229**	91
8.5
9	Edmonton Oilers	NW	82	41	35	6	235	251	88
10	Chicago Blackhawks	CE	82	40	34	8	239	235	88
11	Vancouver Canucks	NW	82	39	33	10	213	215	88
12	Phoenix Coyotes	PA	82	38	37	7	214	231	83
13	Columbus Blue Jackets	CE	82	34	36	12	193	218	80
14	St. Louis Blues	CE	82	33	36	13	205	237	79
15	Los Angeles Kings	PA	82	32	43	7	231	266	71

Divisions: PA – Pacific, CE – Central, NW – Northwest
bold – qualified for playoffs, y – division winner, p – Presidents' Trophy winner

== Playoffs ==
The Wild clinched a playoff spot for the 2008 Stanley Cup playoffs, but lost in the Quarterfinals to the Colorado Avalanche, four games to two.

== Schedule and results ==
=== Regular season ===
2007–08 regular season
October

Game	Date	Visitor	Score	Home	OT	Decision	Attendance	Record	Points	Recap
1	October 4	Chicago	0 – 1	Minnesota		Backstrom	18,568	1–0–0	2	W
2	October 6	Columbus	2 – 3	Minnesota		Backstrom	18,568	2–0–0	4	W
3	October 10	Edmonton	0 – 2	Minnesota		Backstrom	18,568	3–0–0	6	W
4	October 13	Minnesota	3 – 2	Phoenix		Backstrom	12,088	4–0–0	8	W
5	October 14	Minnesota	2 – 0	Anaheim		Harding	17,174	5–0–0	10	W
6	October 16	Minnesota	3 – 4	Los Angeles	SO	Backstrom	14,239	5–0–1	11	OTL
7	October 20	Minnesota	3 – 1	St. Louis		Harding	19,150	6–0–1	13	W
8	October 21	Colorado	2 – 3	Minnesota		Backstrom	18,568	7–0–1	15	W
9	October 24	Minnesota	3 – 5	Calgary		Backstrom	19,289	7–1–1	15	L
10	October 25	Minnesota	4 – 5	Edmonton	SO	Harding	16,839	7–1–2	16	OTL
11	October 28	Minnesota	1 – 3	Colorado		Harding	17,041	7–2–2	16	L
12	October 30	Pittsburgh	4 – 2	Minnesota		Harding	18,568	7–3–2	16	L

November

Game	Date	Visitor	Score	Home	OT	Decision	Attendance	Record	Points	Recap
13	November 1	St. Louis	3 – 2	Minnesota		Harding	18,568	7–4–2	16	L
14	November 3	Calgary	1 – 4	Minnesota		Backstrom	18,568	8–4–2	18	W
15	November 5	Edmonton	2 – 5	Minnesota		Backstrom	18,568	9–4–2	20	W
16	November 11	Minnesota	2 – 4	Colorado		Backstrom	15,434	9–5–2	20	L
17	November 13	Minnesota	2 – 3	Calgary		Backstrom	19,289	9–6–2	20	L
18	November 15	Minnesota	4 – 2	Edmonton		Backstrom	16,839	10–6–2	22	W
19	November 16	Minnesota	2 – 6	Vancouver		Harding	18,630	10–7–2	22	L
20	November 18	Colorado	1 – 4	Minnesota		Harding	18,568	11–7–2	24	W
21	November 21	Vancouver	4 – 2	Minnesota		Harding	18,568	11–8–2	24	L
22	November 23	Columbus	4 – 0	Minnesota		Backstrom	18,568	11–9–2	24	L
23	November 24	Minnesota	4 – 3	Nashville		Backstrom	12,639	12–9–2	26	W
24	November 28	Phoenix	1 – 3	Minnesota		Backstrom	18,568	13–9–2	28	W
25	November 30	St. Louis	2 – 3	Minnesota	OT	Backstrom	18,568	14–9–2	30	W

December

Game	Date	Visitor	Score	Home	OT	Decision	Attendance	Record	Points	Recap
26	December 2	Vancouver	1 – 2	Minnesota		Backstrom	18,568	15–9–2	32	W
27	December 5	Philadelphia	3 – 1	Minnesota		Backstrom	18,568	15–10–2	32	L
28	December 7	Minnesota	0 – 5	Detroit		Harding	19,508	15–11–2	32	L
29	December 8	Minnesota	2 – 1	Columbus		Backstrom	15,666	16–11–2	34	W
30	December 11	Minnesota	1 – 4	San Jose		Backstrom	17,064	16–12–2	34	L
31	December 14	Minnesota	5 – 2	Anaheim		Harding	17,174	17–12–2	36	W
32	December 15	Minnesota	2 – 1	Los Angeles		Harding	16,648	18–12–2	38	W
33	December 18	Nashville	2 – 3	Minnesota		Harding	18,568	19–12–2	40	W
34	December 20	N.Y. Rangers	3 – 6	Minnesota		Harding	18,568	20–12–2	42	W
35	December 22	Detroit	4 – 1	Minnesota		Backstrom	18,568	20–13–2	42	L
36	December 26	Minnesota	3 – 8	Dallas		Harding	18,532	20–14–2	42	L
37	December 27	Minnesota	3 – 2	Phoenix		Backstrom	13,756	21–14–2	44	W
38	December 29	Edmonton	4 – 5	Minnesota	OT	Backstrom	18,568	22–14–2	46	W
39	December 31	San Jose	3 – 2	Minnesota		Backstrom	18,568	22–15–2	46	L

January

Game	Date	Visitor	Score	Home	OT	Decision	Attendance	Record	Points	Recap
40	January 3	Dallas	3 – 6	Minnesota		Backstrom	18,568	23–15–2	48	W
41	January 5	Minnesota	1 – 4	Nashville		Harding	17,113	23–16–2	48	L
42	January 7	Minnesota	1 – 3	Dallas		Backstrom	17,502	23–17–2	48	L
43	January 10	Minnesota	6 – 5	Detroit	SO	Harding	17,848	24–17–2	50	W
44	January 11	Minnesota	5 – 2	Chicago		Harding	21,139	25–17–2	52	W
45	January 13	Phoenix	1 – 4	Minnesota		Harding	18,568	26–17–2	54	W
46	January 16	Calgary	3 – 2	Minnesota	SO	Backstrom	18,568	26–17–3	55	OTL
47	January 18	Anaheim	4 – 2	Minnesota		Harding	18,568	26–18–3	55	L
48	January 21	Minnesota	4 – 2	Vancouver		Backstrom	18,630	27–18–3	57	W
49	January 22	Minnesota	1 – 2	Calgary		Harding	19,289	27–19–3	57	L
50	January 24	Minnesota	3 – 2	Colorado		Backstrom	15,321	28–19–3	59	W
51	January 30	Anaheim	1 – 5	Minnesota		Backstrom	18,568	29–19–3	61	W

February

Game	Date	Visitor	Score	Home	OT	Decision	Attendance	Record	Points	Recap
52	February 2	Minnesota	4 – 1	Columbus		Backstrom	18,529	30–19–3	63	W
53	February 5	Detroit	3 – 2	Minnesota	OT	Backstrom	18,568	30–19–4	64	OTL
54	February 7	Dallas	1 – 0	Minnesota		Backstrom	18,568	30–20–4	64	L
55	February 9	NY Islanders	3 – 4	Minnesota	OT	Backstrom	18,568	31–20–4	66	W
56	February 10	Minnesota	2 – 1	St. Louis	SO	Harding	16,477	32–20–4	68	W
57	February 12	Minnesota	2 – 4	Edmonton		Harding	16,839	32–21–4	68	L
58	February 14	Minnesota	5 – 4	Vancouver	SO	Backstrom	18,630	33–21–4	70	W
59	February 17	Nashville	4 – 5	Minnesota	OT	Backstrom	18,568	34–21–4	72	W
60	February 19	Vancouver	3 – 2	Minnesota	OT	Backstrom	18,568	34–21–5	73	OTL
61	February 20	Minnesota	0 – 3	Chicago		Harding	17,812	34–22–5	73	L
62	February 24	Calgary	2 – 1	Minnesota		Backstrom	18,568	34–23–5	73	L
63	February 26	Minnesota	1 – 4	Washington		Backstrom	17,391	34–24–5	73	L
64	February 27	Minnesota	3 – 2	Tampa Bay		Backstrom	17,211	35–24–5	75	W
65	February 29	Minnesota	3 – 2	Florida		Backstrom	16,927	36–24–5	77	W

March

Game	Date	Visitor	Score	Home	OT	Decision	Attendance	Record	Points	Recap
66	March 2	Los Angeles	1 – 2	Minnesota	OT	Backstrom	18,568	37–24–5	79	W
67	March 4	Chicago	4 – 2	Minnesota		Backstrom	18,568	37–25–5	79	L
68	March 6	Minnesota	2 – 3	Carolina		Harding	16,297	37–26–5	79	L
69	March 7	Minnesota	2 – 3	Atlanta	SO	Backstrom	18,709	37–26–6	80	OTL
70	March 9	San Jose	3 – 2	Minnesota	SO	Backstrom	18,568	37–26–7	81	OTL
71	March 13	New Jersey	4 – 3	Minnesota	SO	Backstrom	18,568	37–26–8	82	OTL
72	March 15	Los Angeles	0 – 2	Minnesota		Backstrom	18,568	38–26–8	84	W
73	March 17	Colorado	1 – 3	Minnesota		Backstrom	18,568	39–26–8	86	W
74	March 19	Minnesota	3 – 4	San Jose	SO	Backstrom	17,496	39–26–9	87	OTL
75	March 21	Minnesota	2 – 1	Vancouver		Backstrom	18,630	40–26–9	89	W
76	March 22	Minnesota	4 – 5	Calgary		Harding	19,289	40–27–9	89	L
77	March 24	Minnesota	3 – 5	Edmonton		Harding	16,839	40–28–9	89	L
78	March 26	Edmonton	1 – 3	Minnesota		Backstrom	18,568	41–28–9	91	W
79	March 28	Vancouver	0 – 4	Minnesota		Backstrom	18,568	42–28–9	93	W
80	March 30	Colorado	2 – 3	Minnesota	OT	Backstrom	18,568	43–28–9	95	W

April

Game	Date	Visitor	Score	Home	OT	Decision	Attendance	Record	Points	Recap
81	April 3	Calgary	1 – 3	Minnesota		Backstrom	18,568	44–28–9	97	W
82	April 6	Minnesota	3 – 4	Colorado	SO	Harding	18.007	44–28–10	98	OTL

Legend: W Win (2 points) L Loss (0 points) OTL Overtime/shootout loss (1 point)

=== Playoffs ===
2008 Stanley Cup playoffs
Western Conference quarterfinals vs. (6) Colorado Avalanche – Avalanche win 4–2

Game	Date	Visitor	Score	Home	OT	Decision	Attendance	Series	Recap
1	April 9	Colorado	3 – 2	Minnesota	11:11 OT	Backstrom	19,352	0 – 1	L
2	April 11	Colorado	2 – 3	Minnesota	1:14 OT	Backstrom	19,360	1 – 1	W
3	April 14	Minnesota	3 – 2	Colorado	11:58 OT	Backstrom	18,007	2 – 1	W
4	April 15	Minnesota	1 – 5	Colorado		Backstrom	18,007	2 – 2	L
5	April 17	Colorado	3 – 2	Minnesota		Backstrom	19,364	2 – 3	L
6	April 19	Minnesota	1 – 2	Colorado		Backstrom	18,007	2 – 4	L

Legend: W Win L Loss

== Player statistics ==
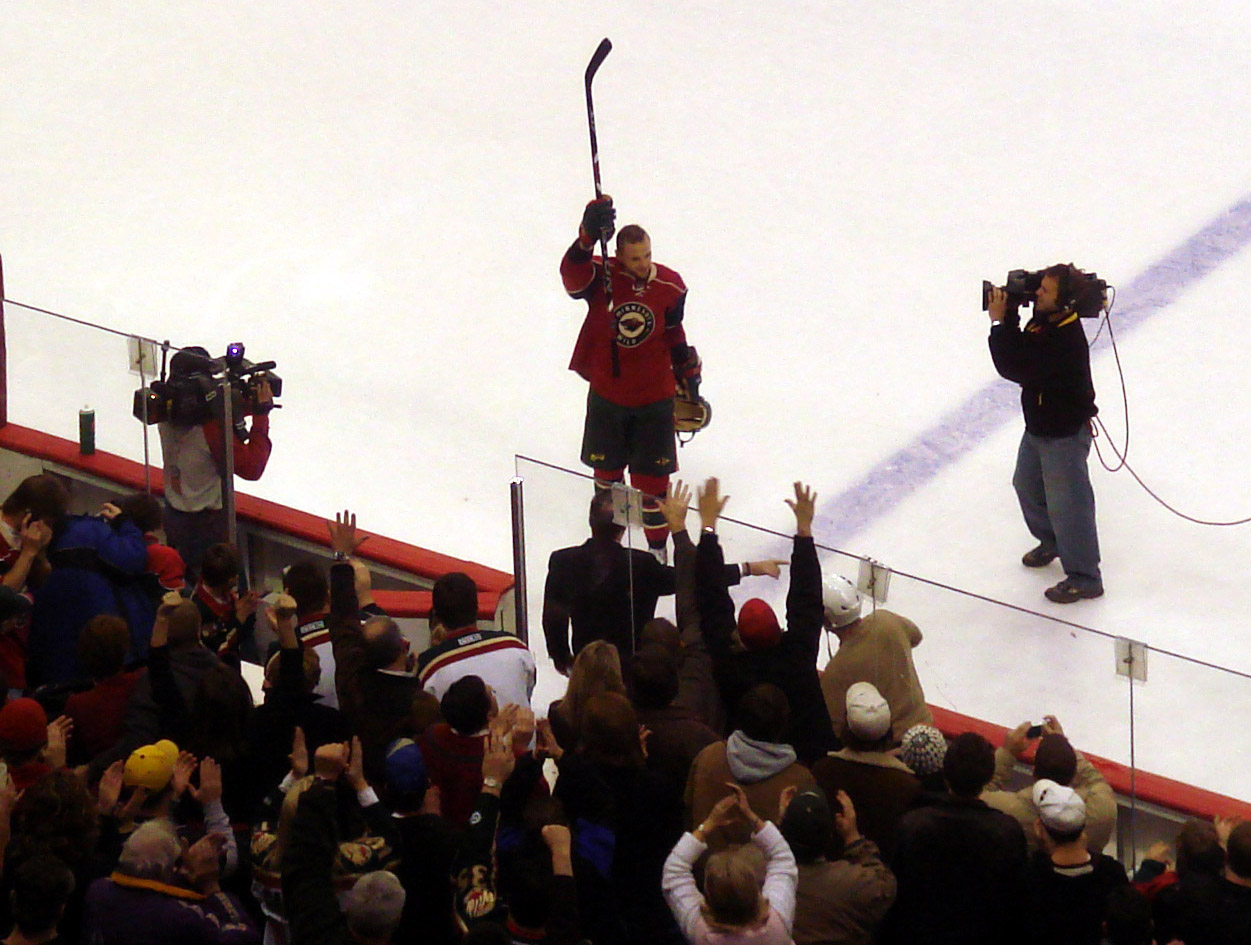
Marián Gáborík salutes Minnesota Wild fans immediately after his five-goal game against the New York Rangers (December 20, 2007)

=== Skaters ===
Note: GP = Games played; G = Goals; A = Assists; Pts = Points; PIM = Penalty Minutes

	Regular season					Playoffs
Player	GP	G	A	Pts	PIM	GP	G	A	Pts	PIM
Marian Gaborik	77	42	41	83	63	6	0	1	1	4
Pierre-Marc Bouchard	81	13	50	63	34	6	2	2	4	2
Brian Rolston	81	31	28	59	53	6	2	4	6	8
Pavol Demitra	68	15	39	54	24	6	1	2	3	2
Brent Burns	82	15	28	43	80	6	0	2	2	6
Mikko Koivu	57	11	31	42	42	6	4	1	5	4
Eric Belanger	75	13	24	37	30	6	0	0	0	4
Mark Parrish	66	16	14	30	16	1	0	0	0	0
Kim Johnsson	80	4	23	27	42	6	0	1	1	18
Kurtis Foster	56	7	12	19	37	0	0	0	0	0

=== Goaltenders ===
Note: GP = Games played; TOI = Time on ice (minutes); W = Wins; L = Losses; OT = Overtime/shootout losses; GA = Goals against; SO = Shutouts; SV% = Save percentage; GAA = Goals against average

	Regular season									Playoffs
Player	GP	TOI	W	L	OT	GA	SO	SV%	GAA	GP	TOI	W	L	GA	SO	SV%	GAA
Niklas Backstrom	58	3409	33	13	8	131	4	.920	2.31	6	361	2	4	17	0	.900	2.82
Josh Harding	29	1571	11	15	2	77	1	.908	2.94	1	20	0	0	0	0	1.000	0.00

== Awards and records ==
=== Milestones ===
Regular Season
Player	Milestone	Reached
Mikko Koivu	100th NHL PIM	October 6, 2007
James Sheppard	1st NHL Game	October 10, 2007
Brian Rolston	900th NHL Game	October 13, 2007
Mark Parrish	600th NHL Game	October 16, 2007
James Sheppard	1st NHL Assist; 1st NHL Point	October 24, 2007
James Sheppard	1st NHL Goal	October 25, 2007
Cal Clutterbuck	1st NHL Game	October 28, 2007
Aaron Voros	1st NHL Game	November 11, 2007
Aaron Voros	1st NHL Goal	November 16, 2007
Jacques Lemaire	1000th NHL Game Coached	December 18, 2007
Marian Gaborik	5 Goal Game	December 20, 2007
	300th Sellout Game in a row	January 16, 2008
Keith Carney	1000th NHL Game	February 24, 2008
Marian Gaborik	400th NHL Point	March 7, 2008
Marian Gaborik	200th NHL Goal	March 15, 2008
Benoit Pouliot	1st NHL Goal; 1st NHL Point	March 22, 2008
Marian Gaborik	40th Goal of Season; Sets Franchise Record	March 30, 2008
Jacques Lemaire	500th Career Win	April 3, 2008
	1st Northwest Division Title	April 3, 2008

== Transactions ==
The Wild have been involved in the following transactions during the 2007–08 season.

=== Trades ===
June 30, 2007	To Boston Bruins Manny Fernandez	To Minnesota Wild Petr Kalus; 4th round pick in 2008

==== Free agents acquired ====
Player	Former team	Contract Terms
Eric Belanger	Atlanta Thrashers	3 years, $5.25 million
Nolan Schaefer	Pittsburgh Penguins	2 years, $1.2 million
Sean Hill	New York Islanders	1 year, $1.325 million

==== Free agents lost ====
Player	New team
Todd White	Atlanta Thrashers
Adam Hall	Pittsburgh Penguins

== Draft picks ==
Minnesota's picks at the 2007 NHL entry draft in Columbus, Ohio.

Round	#	Player	Pos	Nationality	College/Junior/Club team (League)
1	16	Colton Gillies	C	Canada	Saskatoon Blades (WHL)
4	110	Justin Falk	D	Canada	Spokane Chiefs (WHL)
5	140	Cody Almond	C	Canada	Kelowna Rockets (WHL)
6	170	Harri Ilvonen	D	Finland	Tappara Jr. (Finland)
7	200	Carson McMillan	RW	Canada	Calgary Hitmen (WHL)

== See also ==
- 2007–08 NHL season
