= Ilvonen (surname) =

Ilvonen is a surname of Finnish origin.

Notable people with the surname include:

- Aarne Ilvonen (1929–2012), Finnish discus thrower
- Eero Ilvonen (1886–1972), Finnish literary scholar
- Harri Ilvonen (born 1988), Finnish hockey player
- Johan Henrik Ilvonen (1846–1918), Finnish priest and politician
