= 2007–08 Anaheim Ducks season =

NHL team season

2007–08 Anaheim Ducks
- Division: 2nd Pacific
- Conference: 4th Western
- 2007–08 record: 47–27–8
- Home record: 28–9–4
- Road record: 19–18–4
- Goals for: 205
- Goals against: 191

Team information
- General manager: Brian Burke
- Coach: Randy Carlyle
- Captain: Chris Pronger
- Alternate captains: Chris Kunitz; Rob Niedermayer
- Arena: Honda Center
- Average attendance: 17,191 (100.1%); Total: 687,632

Team leaders
- Goals: Corey Perry (29)
- Assists: Ryan Getzlaf (58)
- Points: Ryan Getzlaf (82)
- Penalty minutes: George Parros (183)
- Plus/minus: Ryan Getzlaf (+32)
- Wins: Jean-Sebastien Giguere (35)
- Goals against average: Jonas Hiller (2.07)

The 2007–08 Anaheim Ducks season began September 29, 2007, with a game in London, England, against the Los Angeles Kings. It was the Ducks' 15th season of operation in the National Hockey League (NHL). They began the season as defending Stanley Cup champions.

Key dates prior to the start of the season:

- The 2007 NHL entry draft took place in Columbus, Ohio, on June 22–23.
- The free agency period began on July 1.

== Regular season ==
The Ducks were the most penalized team during the regular season, with 408 power-play opportunities against.

=== Standings ===
==== Divisional standings ====
Pacific Division
		GP	W	L	OTL	GF	GA	Pts
**1**	**y – San Jose Sharks**	**82**	**49**	**23**	**10**	**222**	**193**	**108**
**2**	**Anaheim Ducks**	**82**	**47**	**27**	**8**	**205**	**191**	**102**
**3**	**Dallas Stars**	**82**	**45**	**30**	**7**	**242**	**207**	**97**
4	Phoenix Coyotes	82	38	37	7	214	231	83
5	Los Angeles Kings	82	32	43	7	231	266	71

==== Conference standings ====
Western Conference
R		Div	GP	W	L	OTL	GF	GA	Pts
**1**	**p – Detroit Red Wings**	**CE**	**82**	**54**	**21**	**7**	**257**	**184**	115
**2**	**y – San Jose Sharks**	**PA**	**82**	**49**	**23**	**10**	**222**	**193**	108
**3**	**y – Minnesota Wild**	**NW**	**82**	**44**	**28**	**10**	**223**	**218**	98
**4**	**Anaheim Ducks**	**PA**	**82**	**47**	**27**	**8**	**205**	**191**	102
**5**	**Dallas Stars**	**PA**	**82**	**45**	**30**	**7**	**242**	**207**	97
**6**	**Colorado Avalanche**	**NW**	**82**	**44**	**31**	**7**	**231**	**219**	95
**7**	**Calgary Flames**	**NW**	**82**	**42**	**30**	**10**	**229**	**227**	94
**8**	**Nashville Predators**	**CE**	**82**	**41**	**32**	**9**	**230**	**229**	91
8.5
9	Edmonton Oilers	NW	82	41	35	6	235	251	88
10	Chicago Blackhawks	CE	82	40	34	8	239	235	88
11	Vancouver Canucks	NW	82	39	33	10	213	215	88
12	Phoenix Coyotes	PA	82	38	37	7	214	231	83
13	Columbus Blue Jackets	CE	82	34	36	12	193	218	80
14	St. Louis Blues	CE	82	33	36	13	205	237	79
15	Los Angeles Kings	PA	82	32	43	7	231	266	71

Divisions: PA – Pacific, CE – Central, NW – Northwest
bold – qualified for playoffs, y – division winner, p – Presidents' Trophy winner

== Playoffs ==
The Ducks enter the 2007–08 season as defending Stanley Cup champions. They were defeated in the series 4 games to 2 by their division rival Dallas Stars.

== Schedule and results ==
=== Preseason ===
2007 preseason
Preseason: 3–3–1 (home: 1–2–1; road: 2–1–0)

#	Date	Opponent	Score	OT	Win	Loss	Attendance (Note: Attendance figures provided by ESPN.)	Record	Arena	Recap
1	September 13	Kings	5–4		Aubin (1–0–0)	Levasseur (0–1–0)	16,973*	0–1–0	Honda Center	L
2	September 15	@ Kings	3–2		Hiller (1–0–0)	LaBarbera (0–1–0)	11,107*	1–1–0	Staples Center	W
3	September 16	Coyotes	2–1	SO	Tordjman (1–0–0)	Hiller (1–0–1)	16,888*	1–1–1	Honda Center	OTL
4	September 17	@ Canucks	3–2	OT	Bryzgalov (1–0–0)	MacIntyre (0–0–1)		2–1–1	General Motors Place	W
5	September 19	Sharks	1–0		Greiss (1–0–0)	Hiller (1–1–1)		2–2–1	Honda Center	L
6	September 21	@ Sharks	3–1		Nabokov (1–0–0)	Bryzgalov (1–1–0)	14,837*	2–3–1	HP Pavilion at San Jose	L
7	September 23	Canucks	5–0		Hiller (2–1–1)	Sanford (1–1–0)	17,030*	3–3–1	Honda Center	W

Legend: W Win (2 points) L Loss (0 points) OTL Overtime/shootout loss (1 point)

=== Regular season ===
2007–08 regular season
September: 1–1–0 (home: 1–0–0; road: 0–1–0)

#	Date	Opponent	Score	OT	Win	Loss	Attendance	Record	Arena	Recap	Points
1	September 29	@ Kings	4–1		Bernier (1–0–0)	Bryzgalov (0–1–0)	17,551	0–1–0	O_{2} Arena (in London, UK)	L	0
2	September 30	Kings	4–1		Hiller (1–0–0)	LaBarbera (0–1–0)	17,300	1–1–0	O_{2} Arena (in London, UK)	W	2

October: 3–6–2 (home: 3–2–1; road: 0–4–2)

#	Date	Opponent	Score	OT	Win	Loss	Attendance	Record	Arena	Recap	Points
3	October 3	@ Red Wings	3–2	SO	Hasek (1–0–0)	Bryzgalov (0–1–1)	17,610	1–1–1	Joe Louis Arena	OTL	3
4	October 5	@ Blue Jackets	4–0		Leclaire (1–0–0)	Bryzgalov (0–2–1)	17,852	1–2–1	Nationwide Arena	L	3
5	October 6	@ Penguins	5–4		Fleury (1–1–0)	Hiller (1–1–0)	17,132	1–3–1	Mellon Arena	L	3
6	October 10	Bruins	2–1		Bryzgalov (1–2–1)	Thomas (1–1–0)	17,285	2–3–1	Honda Center	W	5
7	October 14	Wild	2–0		Harding (1–0–0)	Giguere (0–1–0)	17,174	2–4–1	Honda Center	L	5
8	October 15	Red Wings	6–3		Bryzgalov (2–2–1)	Hasek (2–2–0)	17,174	3–4–1	Honda Center	W	7
9	October 17	Predators	3–1		Giguere (1–1–0)	Mason (2–4–0)	17,174	4–4–1	Honda Center	W	9
10	October 20	@ Stars	3–1		Turco (3–1–1)	Giguere (1–2–0)	18,057	4–5–1	American Airlines Center	L	9
11	October 23	@ Blues	4–2		Legace (4–2–0)	Giguere (1–3–0)	14,764	4–6–1	Scottrade Center	L	9
12	October 25	Coyotes	1–0		Auld (2–2–0)	Bryzgalov‡ (2–3–1)	17,174	4–7–1	Honda Center	L	9
13	October 28	Oilers	3–2	SO	Garon (2–1–0)	Giguere (1–3–1)	17,174	4–7–2	Honda Center	OTL	10

November: 8–4–2 (home: 4–1–2; road: 4–3–0)

#	Date	Opponent	Score	OT	Win	Loss	Attendance	Record	Arena	Recap	Points
14	November 1	Blue Jackets	1–2	SO	Giguere (2–3–1)	Norrena (1–1–0)	17,174	5–7–2	Honda Center	W	12
15	November 3	@ Coyotes	5–2		Giguere (3–3–1)	Auld (2–4–0)	15,888	6–7–2	Jobing.com Arena	W	14
16	November 5	Stars	5–0		Turco (4–3–1)	Giguere (3–4–1)	17,174	6–8–2	Honda Center	L	14
17	November 7	Coyotes	6–5	OT	Auld (3–4–0)	Giguere (3–4–2)	17,174	6–8–3	Honda Center	OTL	15
18	November 9	Sharks	2–3	SO	Giguere (4–4–2)	Nabokov (7–7–0)	17,174	7–8–3	Honda Center	W	17
19	November 13	Kings	3–4	SO	Giguere (5–4–2)	LaBarbera (4–4–0)	17,174	8–8–3	Honda Center	W	19
20	November 15	@ Kings	6–3		Giguere (6–4–2)	Aubin (3–2–0)	18,118	9–8–3	Staples Center	W	21
21	November 17	@ Sharks	2–1	SO	Giguere (7–4–2)	Nabokov (11–7–0)	17,496	10–8–3	HP Pavilion at San Jose	W	23
22	November 21	@ Stars	2–1		Giguere (7–5–2)		18,584	10–9–3	American Airlines Center	L	23
23	November 23	Coyotes	4–3	SO	Bryzgalov‡ (3–0–0)	Hiller (1–1–1)	17,174	10–9–4	Honda Center	OTL	24
24	November 25	Kings	2–3		Giguere (8–5–2)	LaBarbera (5–7–0)	17,174	11–9–4	Honda Center	W	26
25	November 27	@ Canucks	0–4		Luongo (11–9–0)	Giguere (8–6–2)	18,630	11–10–4	General Motors Place	L	26
26	November 29	@ Flames	4–1		Giguere (9–6–2)	Kiprusoff (10–11–2)	19,289	12–10–4	Scotiabank Saddledome	W	28
27	November 30	@ Oilers	1–5		Roloson (6–10–1)	Giguere (9–7–2)	16,839	12–11–4	Rexall Place	L	28

December: 7–6–1 (home: 2–3–1; road: 5–3–0)

#	Date	Opponent	Score	OT	Win	Loss	Attendance	Record	Arena	Recap	Points
28	December 2	Oilers	4–0		Garon (6–4–0)	Giguere (9–8–2)	17,174	12–12–4	Honda Center	L	28
29	December 5	Sabres	4–1		Giguere (10–8–2)	Miller (10–11–1)	17,174	13–12–4	Honda Center	W	30
30	December 7	@ Blackhawks	5–3		Giguere (11–8–2)	Khabibulin (10–8–2)	17,734	14–12–4	United Center	W	32
31	December 8	@ Predators	4–2		Mason (8–10–2)	Hiller (1–2–1)	13,469	14–13–4	Sommet Center	L	32
32	December 10	@ Blue Jackets	4–3	OT	Giguere (12–8–2)	Leclaire (10–6–3)	11,984	15–13–4	Nationwide Arena	W	34
33	December 12	Canucks	3–2		Sanford (4–1–0)	Giguere (12–9–2)	17,174	15–14–4	Honda Center	L	34
34	December 14	Wild	5–2		Harding (4–6–1)	Giguere (12–10–2)	17,174	15–15–4	Honda Center	L	34
35	December 16	Sharks	2–1	SO	Nabokov (18–10–4)	Giguere (12–10–3)	17,174	15–15–5	Honda Center	OTL	35
36	December 18	@ Sharks	2–0		Giguere (13–10–3)	Nabokov (18–11–4)	17,197	16–15–5	HP Pavilion at San Jose	W	37
37	December 19	Avalanche	2–1	OT	Hiller (2–2–1)	Budaj (12–6–1)	17,174	17–15–5	Honda Center	W	39
38	December 22	@ Sharks	5–2		Giguere (14–10–3)	Nabokov (18–12–5)	17,496	18–15–5	HP Pavilion at San Jose	W	41
39	December 27	@ Oilers	2–1		Giguere (15–10–3)	Garon (9–8–1)	16,839	19–15–5	Rexall Place	W	43
40	December 29	@ Flames	5–3		Kiprusoff (18–12–7)	Giguere (15–11–3)	19,289	19–16–5	Pengrowth Saddledome	L	43
41	December 30	@ Canucks	2–1		Luongo (18–11–3)	Hiller (2–3–1)	18,630	19–17–5	General Motors Place	L	43

January: 8–4–1 (home: 6–1–0; road: 2–3–1)

#	Date	Opponent	Score	OT	Win	Loss	Attendance	Record	Arena	Recap	Points
42	January 2	Blue Jackets	2–1		Giguere (16–11–3)	Leclaire (13–8–3)	17,174	20–17–5	Honda Center	W	45
43	January 4	Blackhawks	2–1		Hiller (3–3–1)	Khabibulin (15–13–3)	17,174	21–17–5	Honda Center	W	47
44	January 5	@ Coyotes	3–2	SO	Bryzgalov (12–8–1)	Giguere (16–11–4)	16,159	21–17–6	Jobing.com Arena	OTL	48
45	January 7	Predators	5–2		Giguere (17–11–4)	Ellis (10–5–0)	17,174	22–17–6	Honda Center	W	50
46	January 9	Maple Leafs	5–0		Giguere (18–11–4)	Toskala (13–12–4)	17,174	23–17–6	Honda Center	W	52
47	January 13	Sharks	4–3	OT	Giguere (19–11–4)	Greiss (0–0–1)	17,174	24–17–6	Honda Center	W	54
48	January 15	Stars	4–2		Giguere (20–11–4)	Turco (17–10–4)	17,174	25–17–6	Honda Center	W	56
49	January 17	@ Predators	2–1		Giguere (21–11–4)	Mason (12–15–3)	14,193	26–17–6	Sommet Center	W	58
50	January 18	@ Wild	4–2		Hiller (4–3–1)	Harding (10–9–1)	18,568	27–17–6	Xcel Energy Center	W	60
51	January 20	@ Stars	5–2		Turco (19–10–4)	Giguere (21–12–4)	18,461	27–18–6	American Airlines Center	L	60
52	January 23	Red Wings	2–1		Hasek (17–7–2)	Giguere (21–13–4)	17,174	27–19–6	Honda Center	L	60
53	January 24	@ Kings	3–1		LaBarbera (13–18–1)	Giguere (21–14–4)	18,118	27–20–6	Staples Center	L	60
January 27: All-Star Game (East wins—Box)			8–7		Thomas (BOS)	Legace (STL)	18,644		Philips Arena	Atlanta, GA	
54	January 30	@ Wild	5–1		Backstrom (19–9–2)	Giguere (21–15–4)	18,568	27–21–6	Xcel Energy Center	L	60

February: 9–2–2 (home: 4–1–1; road: 5–1–1)

#	Date	Opponent	Score	OT	Win	Loss	Attendance	Record	Arena	Recap	Points
55	February 1	@ Blues	1–0	SO	Legace (19–13–4)	Giguere (21–15–5)	19,150	27–21–7	Scottrade Center	OTL	61
56	February 2	@ Flyers	3–0		Biron (20–11–4)	Hiller (4–4–1)	19,822	27–22–7	Wachovia Center	L	61
57	February 5	@ Islanders	3–0		Giguere (22–15–5)	DiPietro (19–20–6)	9,649	28–22–7	Nassau Memorial Coliseum	W	63
58	February 7	@ Rangers	4–1		Giguere (23–15–5)	Lundqvist (24–21–5)	18,200	29–22–7	Madison Square Garden	W	65
59	February 8	@ Devils	2–1		Giguere (24–15–5)	Brodeur (28–19–3)	15,332	30–22–7	Prudential Center	W	67
60	February 10	@ Red Wings	3–2		Giguere (25–15–5)	Osgood (22–5–2)	20,066	31–22–7	Joe Louis Arena	W	69
61	February 12	@ Avalanche	2–1		Giguere (26–15–5)	Theodore (15–13–2)	16,257	32–22–7	Pepsi Center	W	71
62	February 15	Stars	4–2		Turco (25–12–4)	Giguere (26–16–5)	17,323	32–23–7	Honda Center	L	71
63	February 17	Flames	4–2		Giguere (27–16–5)	Kiprusoff (29–19–8)	17,174	33–23–7	Honda Center	W	73
64	February 20	Avalanche	3–2	SO	Giguere (28–16–5)	Budaj (15–9–4)	17,174	34–23–7	Honda Center	W	75
65	February 22	Blues	2–1	OT	Giguere (29–16–5)	Legace (23–16–7)	17,174	35–23–7	Honda Center	W	77
66	February 24	Blackhawks	6–3		Hiller (5–4–1)	Lalime (11–9–1)	17,174	36–23–7	Honda Center	W	79
67	February 29	Flames	3–1		Giguere (30–16–5)	Kiprusoff (32–20–9)	17,174	37–23–7	Honda Center	W	81

March: 8–4–1 (home: 6–1–0; road: 2–3–1)

#	Date	Opponent	Score	OT	Win	Loss	Attendance	Record	Arena	Recap	Points
68	March 3	Senators	3–1		Giguere (––)	Gerber (24–12–2)	17,174	38–23–7	Honda Center	W	83
69	March 5	@ Blackhawks	3–0		Crawford (1–0–0)	Giguere (31–17–5)	16,666	38–24–7	United Center	L	83
70	March 6	@ Avalanche	1–0		Theodore (21–17–2)	Hiller (5–5–1)	18,007	38–25–7	Pepsi Center	L	83
71	March 9	Canadiens	3–1		Giguere (32–17–5)	Price (16–11–3)	17,174	39–25–7	Honda Center	W	85
72	March 11	@ Coyotes	3–2	SO	Bryzgalov (24–17–4)	Giguere (32–17–6)	14,683	39–25–8	Jobing.com Arena	OTL	86
73	March 12	Canucks	4–1		Hiller (6–5–1)	Luongo (31–21–9)	17,174	40–25–8	Honda Center	W	88
74	March 15	Blues	5–2		Giguere (33–17–6)	Legace (24–23–8)	17,174	41–25–8	Honda Center	W	90
75	March 19	@ Stars	2–1		Giguere (34–17–6)	Turco (30–19–4)	18,584	42–25–8	American Airlines Center	W	92
76	March 21	@ Sharks	2–1		Nabokov (43–20–8)	Hiller (6–6–1)	17,496	42–26–8	HP Pavilion at San Jose	L	92
77	March 22	@ Coyotes	2–1		Hiller (7–6–1)	Bryzgalov (25–20–4)	17,645	43–26–8	Jobing.com Arena	W	94
78	March 26	Kings	2–1	SO	Hiller (8–6–1)	Ersberg (4–3–3)	17,331	44–26–8	Honda Center	W	96
79	March 28	Sharks	3–1		Boucher (3–0–1)	Hiller (8–7–1)	17,334	44–27–8	Honda Center	L	96
80	March 30	Stars	3–2	SO	Giguere (35–17–6)	Turco (31–20–6)	17,174	45–27–8	Honda Center	W	98

April: 2–0–0 (home: 1–0–0; road: 1–0–0)

#	Date	Opponent	Score	OT	Win	Loss	Attendance	Record	Arena	Recap	Points
81	April 5	@ Kings	4–3		Giguere (36–17–6)	Cloutier (2–4–1)	18,118	46–27–8	Staples Center	W	100
82	April 6	Coyotes	3–2	SO	Hiller (9–7–1)	Bryzgalov (26–22–5)	17,269	47–27–8	Honda Center	W	102

Legend: W Win (2 points) L Loss (0 points) OTL Overtime/shootout loss (1 point) All-Star Game

"Points" legend: 1st (Pacific Division) Not in Playoff Position In Playoff Position Clinched playoffs

=== Playoffs ===
2008 Stanley Cup playoffs
Western Conference Quarterfinals vs. (5) Dallas Stars – Stars wins 4–2

#	Date	Opponent	Score	OT	Win	Loss	Attendance	Series	Arena	Recap
1	April 10	Stars	4–0		Turco (1–0)	Giguere (0–1)	17,191	0–1	Honda Center	L
2	April 12	Stars	5–2		Turco (2–0)	Giguere (0–2)	17,181	0–2	Honda Center	L
3	April 15	@ Stars	4–2		Giguere (1–2)	Turco (2–1)	18,532	1–2	American Airlines Center	W
4	April 17	@ Stars	3–1		Turco (3–1)	Giguere (1–3)	18,532	1–3	American Airlines Center	L
5	April 18	Stars	5–2		Giguere (2–3)	Turco (3–2)	17,199	2–3	Honda Center	W
6	April 20	@ Stars	4–1		Turco (4–2)	Giguere (2–4)	18,532	2–4	American Airlines Center	L

Legend: W Win L Loss

== Player statistics ==
=== Skaters ===
Note: GP = Games played; G = Goals; A = Assists; Pts = Points; PIM = Penalty minutes

	Regular season					Playoffs
Player	GP	G	A	Pts	PIM	GP	G	A	Pts	PIM
Ryan Getzlaf	76	24	58	82	94	6	2	3	5	6
Corey Perry	70	29	25	54	108	3	2	1	3	8
Chris Kunitz	81	20	29	49	80	6	0	2	2	8
Chris Pronger	71	12	31	43	126	6	2	3	5	12
Todd Bertuzzi	67	14	25	39	97	6	0	2	2	14
Mathieu Schneider	64	12	27	39	50	6	1	0	1	8
Scott Niedermayer	47	8	16	24	14	6	0	2	2	4
Teemu Selanne	25	12	10	22	8	6	2	2	4	6
Francois Beauchemin	81	2	19	21	59	6	0	0	0	26

=== Goaltenders ===
Note: GP = Games played; TOI = Time on ice (minutes); W = Wins; L = Losses; OT = Overtime/shootout losses; GA = Goals against; SO = Shutouts; SV% = Save percentage; GAA = Goals against average

	Regular season									Playoffs
Player	GP	TOI	W	L	OT	GA	SO	SV%	GAA	GP	TOI	W	L	GA	SO	Sv%	GAA
Jean-Sebastien Giguere	57	3250	35	17	6	114	4	.923	2.10	6	358	2	4	19	0	.898	3.19
Jonas Hiller	22	1158	10	7	1	40	0	.926	2.07
Ilya Bryzgalov‡	9	447	2	3	1	19	0	.909	2.55

†Denotes player spent time with another team before joining Ducks. Stats reflect time with Ducks only.
‡Traded mid-season.

== Awards and records ==
=== Records ===
- February 1: Jean-Sebastien Giguere recorded his 28th shutout with the Ducks, beating Guy Hebert's team record.

=== Milestones ===
Regular Season
Player	Milestone	Reached
Jonas Hiller	1st NHL win	September 30, 2007
Ryan Getzlaf	100th NHL point	October 6, 2007
Kent Huskins	1st NHL goal	October 15, 2007
Chris Pronger	400th NHL assist	October 15, 2007
Brad May	900th NHL game	November 15, 2007
Chris Pronger	900th NHL game	December 11, 2007
Corey Perry	100th NHL point	December 29, 2007
Doug Weight	700th NHL assist (5th American All-Time)	January 9, 2008
Sean O'Donnell	900th NHL game	January 18, 2008

=== Transactions ===
The Ducks have been involved in the following transactions during the 2007–08 season.

=== Trades ===
June 23, 2007	To Vancouver Canucks Ryan Shannon	To Anaheim Ducks Rights to Jason King; Conditional pick in 2009
September 24, 2007	To Anaheim Ducks Mark Mowers	To Boston Bruins Nathan Saunders; Brett Skinner
January 2, 2008	To Anaheim Ducks Brandon Bochenski	To Boston Bruins Shane Hnidy; 6th round pick in 2008 – Nicholas Tremblay
January 9, 2008	To New York Islanders Matt Keith	To Anaheim Ducks Darryl Bootland

=== Free agents ===
Player	Former team	Contract Terms
Mathieu Schneider	Detroit Red Wings	2 years, $11.25 million
Todd Bertuzzi	Detroit Red Wings	2 years, $4 million
Shane Hnidy	Atlanta Thrashers	2 years, $1.515 million

Player	New team	Contract Terms
Shawn Thornton	Boston Bruins	multi-year, undisclosed
Trevor Gillies	Carolina Hurricanes	1 year, minor-league contract
Joe Motzko	Washington Capitals	

=== Waivers ===
November 17, 2007	To Phoenix Coyotes Ilya Bryzgalov	To Anaheim Ducks claimed off waivers

== Draft picks ==
The following were Anaheim's picks at the 2007 NHL entry draft in Columbus, Ohio. The Ducks drafted 16th overall with a pick acquired from the Tampa Bay Lightning. Their own pick, 30th overall, was dealt to the Edmonton Oilers in the Chris Pronger trade.

Round	#	Player	Position	Nationality	College/Junior/Club team (League)
1	19	Logan MacMillan	Center	Canada	Halifax Mooseheads (QMJHL)
2	42	Eric Tangradi	Center	United States	Belleville Bulls (OHL)
3	63	Maxime Macenauer	Center	Canada	Rouyn-Noranda Huskies (QMJHL)
4	92	Justin Vaive	Left wing	United States	U.S. National Team Development Program (NAHL)
4	93	Steven Kampfer	Defence	United States	University of Michigan (CCHA)
4	98	Sebastian Stefaniszin	Goaltender	Germany	Eisbären Berlin (DEL)
4	121	Mattias Modig	Goaltender	Sweden	Luleå HF (Elitserien)
5	151	Brett Morrison	Center	Canada	P.E.I. Rocket (QMJHL)

== Farm teams ==
=== Portland Pirates ===
The Portland Pirates are the Ducks American Hockey League affiliate in 2007–08.

=== Augusta Lynx ===
The Augusta Lynx are the Ducks affiliate in the ECHL.

== See also ==
- 2007–08 NHL season
