= 2007–08 Colorado Avalanche season =

National Hockey League team season

2007–08 Colorado Avalanche
- Division: 2nd Northwest
- Conference: 6th Western
- 2007–08 record: 44–31–7
- Home record: 27–12–2
- Road record: 17–19–5
- Goals for: 231
- Goals against: 219

Team information
- General manager: Francois Giguere
- Coach: Joel Quenneville
- Captain: Joe Sakic
- Alternate captains: Andrew Brunette; Ian Laperriere; Milan Hejduk; Ryan Smyth
- Arena: Pepsi Center
- Average attendance: 16,843 (93.5%)

Team leaders
- Goals: Milan Hejduk (29)
- Assists: Paul Stastny (47)
- Points: Paul Stastny (71)
- Penalty minutes: Ian Laperriere (140)
- Plus/minus: Paul Stastny (+22)
- Wins: Jose Theodore (28)
- Goals against average: Jose Theodore (2.44)

The 2007–08 Colorado Avalanche season began on October 3, 2007, and ended on May 3, 2008. It was the franchise's 36th season, 29th in the National Hockey League, and 13th as the Colorado Avalanche.

== Regular season ==
The Avalanche were the most disciplined team during the regular season, with only 301 power-play opportunities against. They also scored the fewest shorthanded goals of all 30 teams, with 2.

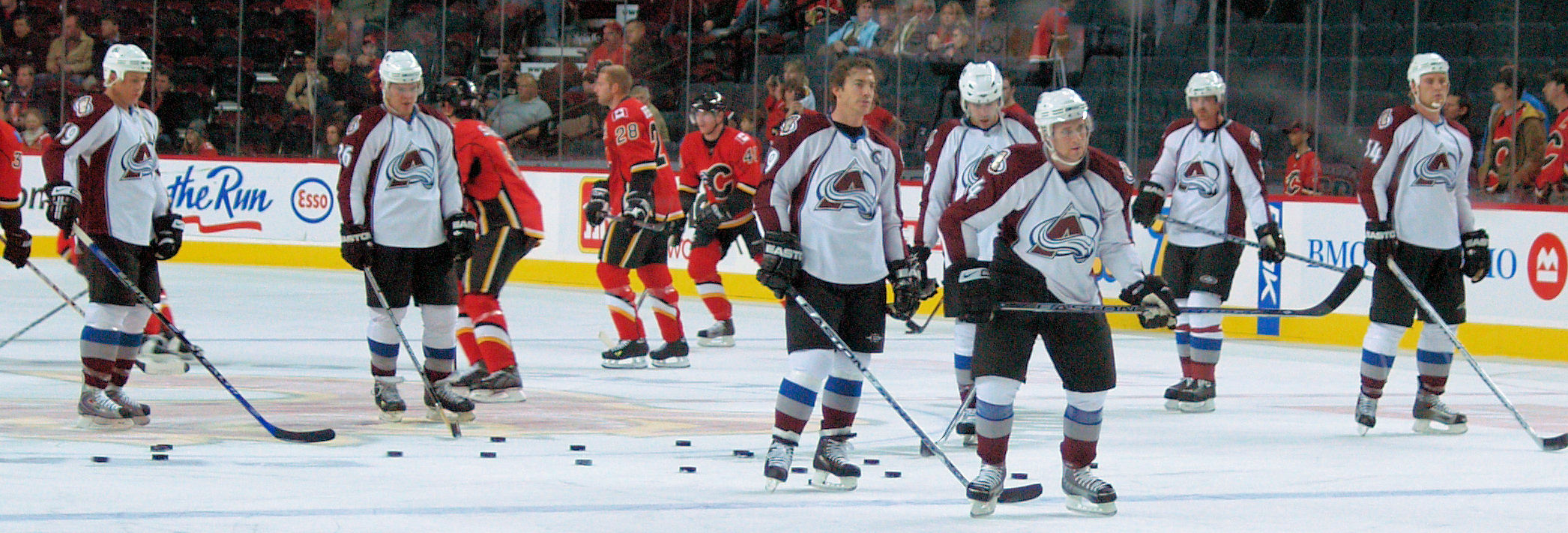
The Avalanche warming up before a game against the Calgary Flames.

=== Divisional standings ===
Northwest Division
		GP	W	L	OTL	GF	GA	Pts
**1**	**y – Minnesota Wild**	**82**	**44**	**28**	**10**	**223**	**218**	**98**
**2**	**Colorado Avalanche**	**82**	**44**	**31**	**7**	**231**	**219**	**95**
**3**	**Calgary Flames**	**82**	**42**	**30**	**10**	**229**	**227**	**94**
4	Edmonton Oilers	82	41	35	6	235	251	88
5	Vancouver Canucks	82	39	33	10	213	215	88

=== Conference standings ===
Western Conference
R		Div	GP	W	L	OTL	GF	GA	Pts
**1**	**p – Detroit Red Wings**	**CE**	**82**	**54**	**21**	**7**	**257**	**184**	115
**2**	**y – San Jose Sharks**	**PA**	**82**	**49**	**23**	**10**	**222**	**193**	108
**3**	**y – Minnesota Wild**	**NW**	**82**	**44**	**28**	**10**	**223**	**218**	98
**4**	**Anaheim Ducks**	**PA**	**82**	**47**	**27**	**8**	**205**	**191**	102
**5**	**Dallas Stars**	**PA**	**82**	**45**	**30**	**7**	**242**	**207**	97
**6**	**Colorado Avalanche**	**NW**	**82**	**44**	**31**	**7**	**231**	**219**	95
**7**	**Calgary Flames**	**NW**	**82**	**42**	**30**	**10**	**229**	**227**	94
**8**	**Nashville Predators**	**CE**	**82**	**41**	**32**	**9**	**230**	**229**	91
8.5
9	Edmonton Oilers	NW	82	41	35	6	235	251	88
10	Chicago Blackhawks	CE	82	40	34	8	239	235	88
11	Vancouver Canucks	NW	82	39	33	10	213	215	88
12	Phoenix Coyotes	PA	82	38	37	7	214	231	83
13	Columbus Blue Jackets	CE	82	34	36	12	193	218	80
14	St. Louis Blues	CE	82	33	36	13	205	237	79
15	Los Angeles Kings	PA	82	32	43	7	231	266	71

Divisions: PA – Pacific, CE – Central, NW – Northwest
bold – qualified for playoffs, y – division winner, p – Presidents' Trophy winner

== Playoffs ==
The Avalanche clinched the sixth seed in the Western Conference playoffs after missing the playoffs last season for the first time since relocating to Denver in 1995.

== Schedule and results ==
=== Preseason ===
2007 preseason
Preseason: 4–2–0 (home: 2–1–0; road: 2–1–0)

Game	Date	Visitor	Score	Home	OT	Decision	Attendance	Record	Recap
1	September 17	Colorado	4 – 3	Phoenix	OT	Weiman	8,392	1–0	W
2	September 19	Los Angeles	3 – 6	Colorado		Budaj		2–0	W
3	September 20	Colorado	6 – 3	Dallas		Wall	14,895	3–0	W
4	September 22	Colorado	2 – 3	Los Angeles†	SO	Weiman		3–1	L
5	September 25	Dallas	5 – 4	Colorado	OT	Budaj		3–2	L
6	September 29	Phoenix	2 – 3	Colorado		Budaj		4–2	W
† In Las Vegas

Legend: W Win (2 points) L Loss (0 points) OTL Overtime/shootout loss (1 point)

=== Regular season ===
2007–08 regular season
October: 7–4–0 (home: 5–0–0; road: 2–4–0)

Game	Date	Visitor	Score	Home	OT	Decision	Attendance	Record	Points	Recap
1	October 3	Dallas	3 – 4	Colorado		Budaj	17,487	1–0–0	2	W
2	October 4	Colorado	0 – 4	Nashville		Budaj	16,363	1–1–0	2	L
3	October 7	San Jose	2 – 6	Colorado		Budaj	15,876	2–1–0	4	W
4	October 12	Colorado	1 – 4	St. Louis		Theodore	19,150	2–2–0	4	L
5	October 13	Columbus	1 – 5	Colorado		Budaj	16,153	3–2–0	6	W
6	October 16	Calgary	4 – 5	Colorado	SO	Theodore	16,722	4–2–0	8	W
7	October 19	Colorado	3 – 5	Chicago		Theodore	13,519	4–3–0	8	L
8	October 21	Colorado	2 – 3	Minnesota		Budaj	18,568	4–4–0	8	L
9	October 23	Colorado	4 – 2	Edmonton		Budaj	16,839	5–4–0	10	W
10	October 26	Colorado	3 – 2	Calgary	OT	Theodore	19,289	6–4–0	12	W
11	October 28	Minnesota	1 – 3	Colorado		Budaj	17,041	7–4–0	14	W

November: 6–6–1 (home: 5–2–0; road: 1–4–1)

Game	Date	Visitor	Score	Home	OT	Decision	Attendance	Record	Points	Recap
12	November 1	Pittsburgh	2 – 3	Colorado		Theodore	18,007	8–4–0	16	W
13	November 3	Vancouver	4 – 3	Colorado		Budaj	18,007	8–5–0	16	L
14	November 5	Calgary	1 – 4	Colorado		Theodore	15,655	9–5–0	18	W
15	November 7	Edmonton	3 – 4	Colorado	SO	Budaj	15,877	10–5–0	20	W
16	November 9	Colorado	1 – 2	Vancouver	OT	Theodore	18,630	10–5–1	21	OTL
17	November 11	Minnesota	2 – 4	Colorado		Budaj	15,434	11–5–1	23	W
18	November 16	Colorado	1 – 6	Dallas		Theodore	18,019	11–6–1	23	L
19	November 18	Colorado	1 – 4	Minnesota		Budaj	18,568	11–7–1	23	L
20	November 20	Colorado	1 – 4	Calgary		Theodore	19,289	11–8–1	23	L
21	November 22	Colorado	3 – 2	Edmonton		Budaj	16,839	12–8–1	25	W
22	November 24	Calgary	5 – 2	Colorado		Theodore	18,007	12–9–1	25	L
23	November 28	Edmonton	2 – 4	Colorado		Budaj	15,128	13–9–1	27	W
24	November 30	Colorado	2 – 3	San Jose		Budaj	17,496	13–10–1	27	L

December: 8–5–2 (home: 5–3–0; road: 3–2–2)

Game	Date	Visitor	Score	Home	OT	Decision	Attendance	Record	Points	Recap
25	December 1	Colorado	5 – 2	Los Angeles		Theodore	17,297	14–10–1	29	W
26	December 3	San Jose	3 – 2	Colorado		Theodore	15,213	14–11–1	29	L
27	December 5	Colorado	4 – 5	Columbus		Budaj	12,851	14–12–1	29	L
28	December 7	Philadelphia	1 – 2	Colorado		Theodore	16,312	15–12–1	31	W
29	December 9	St. Louis	5 – 9	Colorado		Theodore	15,476	16–12–1	33	W
30	December 12	Colorado	1 – 4	Columbus		Theodore	13,150	16–13–1	33	L
31	December 13	Colorado	2 – 1	Nashville		Budaj	12,456	17–13–1	35	W
32	December 15	Nashville	1 – 3	Colorado		Budaj	16,582	18–13–1	37	W
33	December 17	Colorado	4 – 2	Los Angeles		Budaj	16,647	19–13–1	39	W
34	December 19	Colorado	1 – 2	Anaheim	OT	Budaj	17,197	19–13–2	40	OTL
35	December 21	NY Rangers	3 – 4	Colorado	OT	Budaj	16,612	20–13–2	42	W
36	December 23	Vancouver	1 – 3	Colorado		Budaj	17,186	21–13–2	44	W
37	December 27	Detroit	4 – 2	Colorado		Budaj	18,007	21–14–2	44	L
38	December 29	Los Angeles	3 – 1	Colorado		Theodore	17,256	21–15–2	44	L
39	December 31	Colorado	3 – 4	Phoenix	SO	Budaj	12,973	21–15–3	45	OTL

January: 6–5–1 (home: 3–3–1; road: 3–2–0)

Game	Date	Visitor	Score	Home	OT	Decision	Attendance	Record	Points	Recap
40	January 2	Phoenix	5 – 2	Colorado		Budaj	15,232	21–16–3	45	L
41	January 5	NY Islanders	1 – 2	Colorado	OT	Theodore	17,154	22–16–3	47	W
42	January 8	Colorado	0 – 1	Detroit		Theodore	19,160	22–17–3	47	L
43	January 9	Colorado	1 – 2	Washington		Theodore	16,168	22–18–3	47	L
44	January 12	Colorado	5 – 4	Carolina		Theodore	18,680	23–18–3	49	W
45	January 13	Colorado	4 – 3	Florida	SO	Theodore	13,854	24–18–3	51	W
46	January 15	Colorado	3 – 0	Tampa Bay		Theodore	17,222	25–18–3	53	W
47	January 18	Chicago	2 – 1	Colorado	SO	Theodore	18,007	25–18–4	54	OTL
48	January 20	Columbus	1 – 3	Colorado		Theodore	17,197	26–18–4	56	W
49	January 22	Nashville	4 – 0	Colorado		Theodore	15,235	26–19–4	56	L
50	January 24	Minnesota	3 – 2	Colorado		Theodore	15,321	26–20–4	56	L
51	January 30	Chicago	3 – 6	Colorado		Theodore	15,348	27–20–4	58	W

February: 6–6–2 (home: 0–3–1; road: 6–3–1)

Game	Date	Visitor	Score	Home	OT	Decision	Attendance	Record	Points	Recap
52	February 1	Colorado	0 – 2	Detroit		Budaj	20,066	27–21–4	58	L
53	February 2	Colorado	6 – 4	St. Louis		Budaj	19,150	28–21–4	60	W
55	February 4	Phoenix	4 – 3	Colorado	OT	Budaj	14,381	28–21–5	61	OTL
55	February 6	Colorado	3 – 1	San Jose		Theodore	17,087	29–21–5	63	W
56	February 9	Colorado	6 – 2	Vancouver		Theodore	18,630	30–21–5	65	W
57	February 12	Anaheim	2 – 1	Colorado		Theodore	16,257	30–22–5	65	L
58	February 14	St. Louis	4 – 1	Colorado		Theodore	17,131	30–23–5	65	L
59	February 17	Colorado	1 – 2	Chicago		Theodore	21,715	30–24–5	65	L
60	February 18	Detroit	4 – 0	Colorado		Theodore	18,007	30–25–5	65	L
61	February 20	Colorado	2 – 3	Anaheim	SO	Budaj	17,174	30–25–6	66	OTL
62	February 22	Colorado	3 – 2	Phoenix	SO	Theodore	15,882	31–25–6	68	W
63	February 24	Colorado	2 – 3	Edmonton		Theodore	16,839	31–26–6	68	L
64	February 26	Colorado	3 – 2	Calgary	OT	Theodore	19,289	32–26–6	70	W
65	February 27	Colorado	3 – 2	Vancouver	SO	Theodore	18,630	33–26–6	72	W

March: 9–5–1 (home: 8–1–0; road: 1–4–1)

Game	Date	Visitor	Score	Home	OT	Decision	Attendance	Record	Points	Recap
66	March 1	Los Angeles	2 – 5	Colorado		Theodore	18,007	34–26–6	74	W
67	March 4	Vancouver	1 – 2	Colorado		Theodore	17,621	35–26–6	76	W
68	March 6	Anaheim	0 – 1	Colorado		Theodore	18,007	36–26–6	78	W
69	March 8	Dallas	1 – 3	Colorado		Theodore	18,007	37–26–6	80	W
70	March 9	Colorado	0 – 3	Dallas		Theodore	18,532	37–27–6	80	L
71	March 11	Colorado	5 – 2	Atlanta		Theodore	14,089	38–27–6	82	W
72	March 13	Edmonton	1 – 5	Colorado		Budaj	18,007	39–27–6	84	W
73	March 15	New Jersey	4 – 2	Colorado		Theodore	18,007	39–28–6	84	L
74	March 17	Colorado	1 – 3	Minnesota		Theodore	18,568	39–29–6	84	L
75	March 20	Colorado	1 – 2	Calgary		Theodore	19,289	39–30–6	84	L
76	March 22	Colorado	5 – 7	Edmonton		Budaj	16,839	39–31–6	84	L
77	March 24	Calgary	0 – 2	Colorado		Theodore	18,007	40–31–6	86	W
78	March 26	Vancouver	3 – 6	Colorado		Theodore	17,728	41–31–6	88	W
79	March 28	Edmonton	4 – 5	Colorado	SO	Theodore	17,846	42–31–6	90	W
80	March 30	Colorado	2 – 3	Minnesota	OT	Theodore	18,568	42–31–7	91	OTL

April: 2–0–0 (home: 1–0–0; road: 1–0–0)

Game	Date	Visitor	Score	Home	OT	Decision	Attendance	Record	Points	Recap
81	April 1	Colorado	4 – 2	Vancouver		Theodore	18,630	43–31–7	93	W
82	April 6	Minnesota	3 – 4	Colorado	SO	Theodore	18,007	44–31–7	95	W

Legend: W Win (2 points) L Loss (0 points) OTL Overtime/shootout loss (1 point)

=== Playoffs ===
2008 Stanley Cup playoffs
Western Conference Quarterfinals vs. (3) Minnesota Wild – Avalanche win 4–2

Game	Date	Visitor	Score	Home	OT	Decision	Attendance	Series	Recap
1	April 9	Colorado	3 – 2	Minnesota	1OT	Theodore	19,352	1–0	W
2	April 11	Colorado	2 – 3	Minnesota	1OT	Theodore	19,360	1–1	L
3	April 14	Minnesota	3 – 2	Colorado	1OT	Theodore	18,007	1–2	L
4	April 15	Minnesota	1 – 5	Colorado		Theodore	18,007	2–2	W
5	April 17	Colorado	3 – 2	Minnesota		Theodore	19,364	3–2	W
6	April 19	Minnesota	1 – 2	Colorado		Theodore	18,007	4–2	W

Western Conference Semifinals vs. (1) Detroit Red Wings – Red Wings win 4–0

Game	Date	Visitor	Score	Home	OT	Decision	Attendance	Series	Recap
1	April 24	Colorado	3 – 4	Detroit		Theodore	20,066	0–1	L
2	April 26	Colorado	1 – 5	Detroit		Theodore	20,066	0–2	L
3	April 29	Detroit	4 – 3	Colorado		Theodore	18,007	0–3	L
4	May 1	Detroit	8 - 2	Colorado		Theodore	18,007	0-4	L

Legend: W Win L Loss

== Player statistics ==
=== Skaters ===
Note: GP = Games played; G = Goals; A = Assists; Pts = Points; PIM = Penalty minutes
As of 6 April 2008

	Regular season					Playoffs
Player	GP	G	A	Pts	PIM	GP	G	A	Pts	PIM
Paul Stastny	66	24	47	71	24
Andrew Brunette	82	19	40	59	14
Milan Hejduk	77	29	25	54	36
Wojtek Wolski	77	18	30	48	14
Joe Sakic	44	13	27	40	20
Ryan Smyth	55	14	23	37	50
Marek Svatos	62	26	11	37	32
John-Michael Liles	81	6	26	32	26
Tyler Arnason	70	10	21	31	16
Ruslan Salei	82	6	24	30	98
Jaroslav Hlinka	63	8	20	28	16

=== Goaltenders ===
Note: GP = Games played; TOI = Time on ice (minutes); W = Wins; L = Losses; OT = Overtime/shootout losses; GA = Goals against; SO = Shutouts; SV% = Save percentage; GAA = Goals against average

	Regular season									Playoffs
Player	GP	TOI	W	L	OT	GA	SO	SV%	GAA	GP	TOI	W	L	GA	SO	SV%	GAA
Peter Budaj	35	1912	16	10	4	82	0	.903	2.57
Jose Theodore	53	3028	28	21	3	123	3	.910	2.44
Tyler Weiman	1	16	0	0	0	0	0	1.000	0.00

== Records and milestones ==
=== Milestones ===
- On October 7, Joe Sakic scored twice to move past Phil Esposito into 8th place all-time in scoring.
- On October 26, Joel Quenneville won his 400th game as a head coach, to move him into 7th place on the all-time list. Joe Sakic also picked up his 1,600th career point by providing the primary assist to Ryan Smyth's OT winner against the Flames, and Andrew Brunette picked up his 500th career point with a secondary assist to Joe Sakic's goal that put the Avs up 1–0 in the first period.
- With a 4–2 win over the Edmonton Oilers at the Pepsi Center on November 28, the Avalanche won their 500th regular season game since their move from Quebec in 1995.
- With a 9–5 win over St. Louis on December 9, the Avalanche reached 1,000 wins in their franchise history.
- In a game against the Edmonton Oilers on March 22, Joe Sakic assisted on a Tyler Arnason goal for his 1,000th career assist, becoming just the 11th player in NHL history to reach 1,000 assists.

== Transactions ==
The Avalanche were involved in the following transactions during the season:

=== Trades ===
November 8, 2007	To Colorado Avalanche ----Jason Bacashihua	To St. Louis Blues ----7th round pick in 2008 entry draft
January 22, 2008	To Colorado Avalanche ---- Darcy Campbell; Philippe Dupuis	To Columbus Blue Jackets ---- Mark Rycroft
February 26, 2008	To Colorado Avalanche ---- Ruslan Salei	To Florida Panthers ---- Karlis Skrastins; 3rd round pick in 2008
February 26, 2008	To Colorado Avalanche ---- Adam Foote	To Columbus Blue Jackets ---- conditional 1st round pick in 2008 or 2009

=== Free agents ===
Player	Former team	Contract terms
Scott Hannan	San Jose Sharks	4 years, $18 million
Ryan Smyth	New York Islanders	5 years, $31.25 million
Matt Hussey	Detroit Red Wings	1 year, $475,000
Wyatt Smith	Minnesota Wild	1 year, $500,000
Peter Forsberg	Nashville Predators	1 year, $1.1 million

Player	New team
Brett McLean	Florida Panthers
Ken Klee	Atlanta Thrashers
Patrice Brisebois	Montreal Canadiens

== Draft picks ==
Colorado had nine picks at the 2007 NHL entry draft in Columbus, Ohio. The Avalanche picked 14th overall.

Round	#	Player	Position	Nationality	College/junior/club team (league)
1	14	Kevin Shattenkirk	Defenseman	United States	US National Team Development Program (NAHL)
2	45	Colby Cohen	Defenseman	United States	Lincoln Stars (USHL)
2	49	Trevor Cann	Goalie	Canada	Peterborough Petes (OHL)
2	55	TJ Galiardi	Wing	Canada	Dartmouth College (ECAC)
4	105	Brad Malone	Center/Left Wing	Canada	Sioux Falls Stampede (USHL)
4	113	Kent Patterson	Goalie	United States	Cedar Rapids RoughRiders (USHL)
5	135	Paul Carey	Center	United States	Boston College Eagles (Hockey East)
6	155	Jens Hellgren	Defenseman	Sweden	Frölunda Jr. (SEL)
7	195	Johan Alcen	Wing	Sweden	Brynäs IF (SEL)

== Farm teams ==
=== Lake Erie Monsters ===
The Avalanche had a new American Hockey League affiliate in the Lake Erie Monsters, based in Cleveland, Ohio. The team is a revival of the Utah Grizzlies franchise that had been dormant since 2005.

=== Johnstown Chiefs ===
The Johnstown Chiefs of the ECHL were the Avalanche's second-tier affiliate.

== See also ==
- 2006–07 NHL season
- 2007–08 NHL season
