= 2007–08 Nashville Predators season =

Professional ice hockey team season

2007–08 Nashville Predators
- Division: 2nd Central
- Conference: 8th Western
- 2007–08 record: 41–32–9
- Home record: 23–14–4
- Road record: 18–18–5
- Goals for: 230
- Goals against: 229

Team information
- General manager: David Poile
- Coach: Barry Trotz
- Captain: Jason Arnott
- Alternate captains: Jean-Pierre Dumont; Steve Sullivan
- Arena: Sommet Center
- Average attendance: 14,910 (87.1%)

Team leaders
- Goals: Jean-Pierre Dumont (29)
- Assists: Jason Arnott (44)
- Points: Jason Arnott and Jean-Pierre Dumont (72)
- Penalty minutes: Jordin Tootoo (100)
- Plus/minus: Jason Arnott (+19)
- Wins: Dan Ellis (23)
- Goals against average: Dan Ellis (2.34)

The 2007–08 Nashville Predators season began October 4, 2007. It was their tenth season in the National Hockey League (NHL).

The 2007 off-season was dominated by the attempted purchase of the Predators by Canadian businessman Jim Balsillie, who signed a letter of intent to purchase the team for at least $220 million. The attempted sale led to widespread speculation that Balsillie intended to relocate the team to Hamilton, Ontario, if the Predators failed to reach a 14,000 paid average attendance in 2007–08, allowing the team to break its lease. Balsillie had already entered negotiations on a lease at Copps Coliseum in Hamilton. Despite calling the negotiations a "contingency plan," Balsillie petitioned the NHL to decide on his ability to relocate the franchise at the same time the NHL Board of Governors voted on his purchase of the team. However, the deal was ended by Predators Owner Craig Leipold on June 22, as he informed the NHL that he was pulling out of the agreement due to a lack of a finalized sale agreement and over concerns that Balsillie would relocate the team to Hamilton.

On August 1, a group led by local businessman David Freeman issued a letter of intent to purchase the Predators. The sale was approved by the Board of Governors on November 29.

In January, it was revealed that former Predators Owner Craig Leipold was purchasing the majority share in the Minnesota Wild.

Key dates prior to the start of the season:

- The 2007 NHL entry draft took place in Columbus, Ohio, on June 22–23.
- The free agency period began on July 1.

== Regular season ==
On November 15, 2007, Martin Erat scored just 19 seconds into the overtime period to give the Predators a 5–4 home win over the Chicago Blackhawks. The Thrashers' Marian Hossa would tie that mark in overtime on December 23, 2007, in a 3–2 Atlanta road win over the St. Louis Blues. Both goals would prove to be the fastest overtime goals scored during the 2007–08 regular season.

=== Divisional standings ===
Central Division
		GP	W	L	OTL	GF	GA	Pts
**1**	**p – Detroit Red Wings**	**82**	**54**	**21**	**7**	**257**	**184**	**115**
**2**	**Nashville Predators**	**82**	**41**	**32**	**9**	**230**	**229**	**91**
3	Chicago Blackhawks	82	40	34	8	239	235	88
4	Columbus Blue Jackets	82	34	36	12	193	218	80
5	St. Louis Blues	82	33	36	13	205	237	79

=== Conference standings ===
Western Conference
R		Div	GP	W	L	OTL	GF	GA	Pts
**1**	**p – Detroit Red Wings**	**CE**	**82**	**54**	**21**	**7**	**257**	**184**	115
**2**	**y – San Jose Sharks**	**PA**	**82**	**49**	**23**	**10**	**222**	**193**	108
**3**	**y – Minnesota Wild**	**NW**	**82**	**44**	**28**	**10**	**223**	**218**	98
**4**	**Anaheim Ducks**	**PA**	**82**	**47**	**27**	**8**	**205**	**191**	102
**5**	**Dallas Stars**	**PA**	**82**	**45**	**30**	**7**	**242**	**207**	97
**6**	**Colorado Avalanche**	**NW**	**82**	**44**	**31**	**7**	**231**	**219**	95
**7**	**Calgary Flames**	**NW**	**82**	**42**	**30**	**10**	**229**	**227**	94
**8**	**Nashville Predators**	**CE**	**82**	**41**	**32**	**9**	**230**	**229**	91
8.5
9	Edmonton Oilers	NW	82	41	35	6	235	251	88
10	Chicago Blackhawks	CE	82	40	34	8	239	235	88
11	Vancouver Canucks	NW	82	39	33	10	213	215	88
12	Phoenix Coyotes	PA	82	38	37	7	214	231	83
13	Columbus Blue Jackets	CE	82	34	36	12	193	218	80
14	St. Louis Blues	CE	82	33	36	13	205	237	79
15	Los Angeles Kings	PA	82	32	43	7	231	266	71

Divisions: PA – Pacific, CE – Central, NW – Northwest
bold – qualified for playoffs, y – division winner, p – Presidents' Trophy winner

== Schedule and results ==
=== Regular season ===
2007–08 regular season
October: 4–7–0 (home: 4–2–0; road: 0–5–0)

Game	Date	Visitor	Score	Home	OT	Decision	Attendance	Record	Points	Recap
1	October 4	Colorado	0 – 4	Nashville		Mason	16,363	1–0–0	2	W
2	October 6	Dallas	1 – 5	Nashville		Mason	13,079	2–0–0	4	W
3	October 10	Nashville	1 – 4	St. Louis		Mason	19,150	2–1–0	4	L
4	October 11	Phoenix	6 – 3	Nashville		Mason	12,155	2–2–0	4	L
5	October 13	Calgary	7 – 4	Nashville		Mason	13,152	2–3–0	4	L
6	October 17	Nashville	1 – 3	Anaheim		Mason	17,174	2–4–0	4	L
7	October 20	Nashville	0 – 3	San Jose		Mason	17,496	2–5–0	4	L
8	October 23	Nashville	0 – 6	Los Angeles		Mason	14,026	2–6–0	4	L
9	October 25	Atlanta	0 – 3	Nashville		Ellis	13,383	3–6–0	6	W
10	October 27	Florida	3 – 4	Nashville		Ellis	15,767	4–6–0	8	W
11	October 30	Nashville	1 – 5	Calgary		Mason	19,289	4–7–0	8	L

November: 8–2–2 (home: 3–1–1; road: 5–1–1)

Game	Date	Visitor	Score	Home	OT	Decision	Attendance	Record	Points	Recap
12	November 1	Nashville	3 – 0	Vancouver		Ellis	18,630	5–7–0	10	W
13	November 2	Nashville	4 – 1	Edmonton		Ellis	16,839	6–7–0	12	W
14	November 4	Nashville	5 – 2	Chicago		Mason	12,086	7–7–0	14	W
15	November 7	Nashville	3 – 2	Detroit	SO	Mason	16,885	7–7–1	15	OTL
16	November 10	Columbus	4 – 3	Nashville	SO	Mason	15,947	8–7–1	17	W
17	November 12	Nashville	4 – 1	Columbus		Mason	12,554	9–7–1	19	W
18	November 15	Chicago	4 – 5	Nashville	OT	Mason	15,353	10–7–1	21	W
19	November 17	St. Louis	3 – 2	Nashville	SO	Mason	15,246	10–7–2	22	OTL
20	November 19	Nashville	1 – 2	St. Louis		Mason	15,239	10–8–2	22	L
21	November 22	Detroit	2 – 3	Nashville		Mason	14,346	11–8–2	24	W
22	November 24	Minnesota	4 – 3	Nashville		Mason	12,639	11–9–2	24	L
23	November 29	Nashville	6 – 5	Ottawa		Ellis	19,538	12–9–2	26	W

December: 6–9–0 (home: 3–4–0; road: 4–5–0)

Game	Date	Visitor	Score	Home	OT	Decision	Attendance	Record	Points	Recap
24	December 1	Nashville	5 – 4	Montreal	SO	Ellis	21,273	13–9–2	28	W
25	December 4	Nashville	1 – 3	Toronto		Mason	19,400	13–10–2	28	L
26	December 6	Vancouver	5 – 2	Nashville		Ellis	15,918	13–11–2	28	L
27	December 8	Anaheim	2 – 4	Nashville		Mason	13,469	14–11–2	30	W
28	December 10	Detroit	2 – 1	Nashville		Ellis	15,056	14–12–2	30	L
29	December 13	Colorado	2 – 1	Nashville		Mason	12,456	14–13–2	30	L
30	December 15	Nashville	1 – 3	Colorado		Mason	16,582	14–14–2	30	L
31	December 18	Nashville	2 – 3	Minnesota		Ellis	18,568	14–15–2	30	L
32	December 19	Nashville	2 – 5	Chicago		Ellis	14,151	14–16–2	30	L
33	December 22	Los Angeles	3 – 4	Nashville		Ellis	15,698	15–16–2	32	W
34	December 23	Nashville	3 – 1	Columbus		Mason	15,481	16–16–2	34	W
35	December 26	Nashville	2 – 5	Chicago		Mason	20,511	16–17–2	34	L
36	December 27	Columbus	3 – 4	Nashville		Mason	14,331	17–17–2	36	W
37	December 29	San Jose	5 – 2	Nashville		Mason	13,298	17–18–2	36	L
38	December 31	Nashville	1 – 0	Dallas		Ellis	18,584	18–18–2	38	W

January: 8–3–3 (home: 5–1–1; road: 3–2–2)

Game	Date	Visitor	Score	Home	OT	Decision	Attendance	Record	Points	Recap
39	January 3	Edmonton	2 – 5	Nashville		Ellis	12,676	19–18–2	40	W
40	January 5	Minnesota	1 – 4	Nashville		Ellis	17,113	20–18–2	42	W
41	January 7	Nashville	2 – 5	Anaheim		Ellis	17,174	20–19–2	42	L
42	January 8	Nashville	7 – 0	Los Angeles		Mason	14,751	21–19–2	44	W
43	January 12	Nashville	1 – 2	Columbus	SO	Mason	16,230	21–19–3	45	OTL
44	January 13	Chicago	3 – 2	Nashville	SO	Ellis	12,484	21–19–4	46	OTL
45	January 15	Calgary	0 – 3	Nashville		Mason	11,764	22–19–4	48	W
46	January 17	Anaheim	2 – 1	Nashville		Mason	14,193	22–20–4	48	L
47	January 19	Nashville	5 – 2	St. Louis		Mason	19,275	23–20–4	50	W
48	January 21	St. Louis	3 – 6	Nashville		Mason	13,642	24–20–4	52	W
49	January 22	Nashville	4 – 0	Colorado		Ellis	15,235	25–20–4	54	W
50	January 24	Nashville	3 – 4	Phoenix	OT	Mason	12,622	25–20–5	55	OTL
51	January 29	Nashville	1 – 3	Boston		Mason	14,150	25–21–5	55	L
52	January 31	Columbus	2 – 4	Nashville		Mason	13,745	26–21–5	57	W

February: 6–4–3 (home: 5–2–2; road: 1–2–1)

Game	Date	Visitor	Score	Home	OT	Decision	Attendance	Record	Points	Recap
53	February 2	Phoenix	2 – 3	Nashville		Ellis		27–21–5	59	W
54	February 5	Carolina	0 – 1	Nashville		Ellis		28–21–5	61	W
55	February 7	Tampa Bay	2 – 1	Nashville	OT	Ellis		28–21–6	62	OTL
56	February 9	Nashville	3 – 4	San Jose		Ellis		28–22–6	62	L
57	February 10	Nashville	6 – 3	Phoenix		Ellis		29–22–6	64	W
58	February 12	Detroit	2 – 4	Nashville		Ellis		30–22–6	66	W
59	February 14	Chicago	6 – 1	Nashville		Mason		30–23–6	66	L
60	February 16	St. Louis	1 – 2	Nashville		Ellis		31–23–6	68	W
61	February 17	Nashville	4 – 5	Minnesota	OT	Ellis		31–23–7	69	OTL
62	February 19	Edmonton	4 – 5	Nashville		Ellis		32–23–7	71	W
63	February 21	Vancouver	3 – 2	Nashville	OT	Ellis		32–23–8	72	OTL
64	February 23	Dallas	6 – 3	Nashville		Ellis		32–24–8	72	L
65	February 27	Nashville	4 – 8	Buffalo		Mason		32–25–8	72	L

March: 7–6–1 (home: 2–4–0; road: 5–2–1)

Game	Date	Visitor	Score	Home	OT	Decision	Attendance	Record	Points	Recap
66	March 1	Nashville	3 – 1	Dallas		Ellis	18,584	33–25–8	74	W
67	March 4	Nashville	5 – 1	Edmonton		Ellis	16,839	34–25–8	76	W
68	March 6	Nashville	2 – 6	Vancouver		Ellis	18,630	34–26–8	76	L
69	March 7	Nashville	2 – 1	Calgary		Ellis	19,289	35–26–8	78	W
70	March 9	Nashville	3 – 4	Detroit		Mason	20,066	35–27–8	78	L
71	March 11	San Jose	2 – 1	Nashville		Ellis	14,965	35–28–8	78	L
72	March 13	Los Angeles	4 – 1	Nashville		Ellis	15,853	35–29–8	78	L
73	March 15	Nashville	3 – 1	Detroit		Ellis	20,066	36–29–8	80	W
74	March 18	Washington	4 – 2	Nashville		Ellis	17,113	36–30–8	80	L
75	March 20	Detroit	6 – 3	Nashville		Mason	17,113	36–31–8	80	L
76	March 22	Chicago	1 – 2	Nashville	SO	Ellis	17,113	37–31–8	82	W
77	March 25	Columbus	0 – 3	Nashville		Ellis	16,330	38–31–8	84	W
78	March 28	Nashville	2 – 0	Columbus		Ellis	15,595	39–31–8	86	W
79	March 30	Nashville	0 – 1	Detroit	OT	Ellis	20,066	39–31–9	87	OTL

April: 2–1–0 (home: 1–0–0; road: 1–1–0)

Game	Date	Visitor	Score	Home	OT	Decision	Attendance	Record	Points	Recap
80	April 1	Nashville	4 – 3	St. Louis	OT	Mason	17,357	40–31–9	89	W
81	April 3	St. Louis	2 – 3	Nashville		Ellis	17,113	41–31–9	91	W
82	April 4	Nashville	1 – 3	Chicago		Mason	21,929	41–32–9	91	L

Legend: W Win (2 points) L Loss (0 points) OTL Overtime/shootout loss (1 point)

=== Playoffs ===
2008 Stanley Cup playoffs
Western Conference quarterfinals: vs. (1) Detroit Red Wings — Red Wings win 4–2

Game	Date	Visitor	Score	Home	OT	Decision	Attendance	Series	Recap
1	April 10	Nashville	1 – 3	Detroit		Ellis	20,066	0 – 1	L
2	April 12	Nashville	2 – 4	Detroit		Ellis	20,066	0 – 2	L
3	April 14	Detroit	3 – 5	Nashville		Ellis	17,113	1 – 2	W
4	April 16	Detroit	2 – 3	Nashville		Ellis	17,113	2 – 2	W
5	April 18	Nashville	1 – 2	Detroit	1OT	Ellis	20,066	2 – 3	L
6	April 20	Detroit	3 – 0	Nashville		Ellis	17,113	2 – 4	L

Legend: W Win L Loss

== Player statistics ==
=== Skaters ===
Note: GP = Games played; G = Goals; A = Assists; Pts = Points; PIM = Penalty minutes

	Regular season					Playoffs
Player	GP	G	A	Pts	PIM	GP	G	A	Pts	PIM
Jason Arnott	79	28	44	72	54	4	1	0	1	4
Jean-Pierre Dumont	80	29	43	72	34	6	0	2	2	4
Alexander Radulov	81	26	32	58	44	6	2	2	4	6
Martin Erat	76	23	34	57	40	6	1	3	4	8
David Legwand	65	15	29	44	38	3	1	0	1	2
Marek Zidlicky	79	5	38	43	63	6	0	3	3	8
Vernon Fiddler	79	11	21	32	47	6	0	0	0	0
Ryan Suter	76	7	24	31	71	6	1	1	2	4
Radek Bonk	79	14	15	29	40	6	1	0	1	2
Dan Hamhuis	80	4	23	27	66	6	1	1	2	6

=== Goaltenders ===
Note: GP = Games played; TOI = Time on ice (minutes); W = Wins; L = Losses; OT = Overtime/shootout losses; GA = Goals against; SO = Shutouts; Sv% = Save percentage; GAA = Goals against average

	Regular season									Playoffs
Player	GP	TOI	W	L	OT	GA	SO	Sv%	GAA	GP	TOI	W	L	GA	SO	Sv%	GAA
Chris Mason	51	2692	18	22	6	130	4	.898	2.90	0	0	0	0	0	0	.000	0.00
Dan Ellis	44	2229	23	10	3	87	6	.924	2.34	6	357	2	4	15	0	.938	2.52
Pekka Rinne	1	29	0	0	0	0	0	1.000	0.00	0	0	0	0	0	0	.000	0.00

== Awards and records ==
=== Records ===
On March 30, goaltender Dan Ellis had a 233:39 long shutout streak snapped in a 1–0 overtime loss to the Detroit Red Wings. This was the fifth longest shutout streak in league history

=== Milestones ===
Regular season
Player	Milestone	Reached
Jason Arnott	700th NHL Point	October 4, 2007
Ville Koistinen	1st NHL Game	October 6, 2007
Martin Erat	200th NHL Point	October 11, 2007
Jason Arnott	900th NHL Game	October 23, 2007
Dan Ellis	1st NHL Shutout	October 25, 2007
Kevin Klein	1st NHL Assist	October 25, 2007
Jason Arnott	400th NHL Assist	October 27, 2007
David Legwand	500th NHL Game	November 10, 2007
David Legwand	300th NHL Point	November 15, 2007
Chris Mason	200th NHL Game	November 19, 2007
Jed Ortmeyer	200th NHL Game	December 1, 2007

== Transactions ==
The Predators were involved in the following transactions during the 2007–08 season.

=== Trades ===
June 18, 2007	To Philadelphia Flyers Kimmo Timonen; Scott Hartnell	To Nashville Predators Nashville's 1st-round pick in 2007
June 22, 2007	To Florida Panthers Tomas Vokoun	To Nashville Predators 1st-round pick in 2008; 2nd-round pick in 2007 conditional 2nd-round pick
February 26, 2008	To Tampa Bay Lightning 7th-round pick in 2008	To Nashville Predators Jan Hlavac
February 26, 2008	To Anaheim Ducks Future considerations	To Nashville Predators Brandon Bochenski

=== Free agents ===
Player	Former team	Contract Terms
Jed Ortmeyer	New York Rangers	2 years, $1.5 million
Radek Bonk	Montreal Canadiens	2 years, $2.95 million
Greg de Vries	Atlanta Thrashers	2 years, $5 million
Shane Willis	Carolina Hurricanes	1 year, $475,000
Dan Ellis	Dallas Stars	1 year, $500,000
Martin Gelinas	Florida Panthers	1 year, $1.25 million
Josh Langfield	Detroit Red Wings	1 year, $575,000

Player	New team
Paul Kariya	St. Louis Blues
Sheldon Brookbank	Columbus Blue Jackets
Vitaly Vishnevski	New Jersey Devils

== Draft picks ==
Nashville's picks at the 2007 NHL entry draft in Columbus, Ohio. The Predators possess the 23rd overall pick in the draft. The pick was originally traded to the Philadelphia Flyers when the Predators acquired Peter Forsberg. Nashville re-acquired the pick, however, on June 18 in exchange for Scott Hartnell and Kimmo Timonen.

Round	#	Player	Position	Nationality	College/junior/club team (League)
1	23	Jonathon Blum	D	United States	Vancouver Giants (WHL)
2	54	Jeremy Smith	G	United States	Plymouth Whalers (OHL)
2	58	Nick Spaling	C	Canada	Kitchener Rangers (OHL)
3	81	Ryan Thang	LW	United States	University of Notre Dame (CCHA)
4	114	Ben Ryan	C	United States	University of Notre Dame (CCHA)
4	119	Mark Santorelli	C	Canada	Chilliwack Bruins (WHL)
5	144	Andreas Thuresson	W	Sweden	Malmo Redhawks (SEL)
6	174	Robert Dietrich	D	Germany	DEG Metro Stars (DEL)
7	204	Atte Engren	G	Finland	Lukko (SM-liiga)

== Farm teams ==
=== Milwaukee Admirals ===
The Milwaukee Admirals are the Predators' top affiliate, playing in the American Hockey League in 2007–08.

=== New Mexico Scorpions ===
The New Mexico Scorpions were a Predators' affiliate, playing in the Central Hockey League in 2007–08. On July 2, 2009, the Scorpions ceased operations.

== See also ==
- 2007–08 NHL season
