= 2007–08 Chicago Blackhawks season =

National Hockey League team season

2007–08 Chicago Blackhawks
- Division: 3rd Central
- Conference: 10th Western
- 2007–08 record: 40–34–8
- Home record: 23–16–2
- Road record: 17–18–6
- Goals for: 239
- Goals against: 235

Team information
- General manager: Dale Tallon
- Coach: Denis Savard
- Captain: Vacant
- Alternate captains: Martin Lapointe (Oct–Feb); Robert Lang (Oct, Feb–Apr); Patrick Sharp (Oct, Feb–Apr); Tuomo Ruutu (Nov); Brent Sopel (Nov, Feb–Apr); Brent Seabrook (Dec); Jonathan Toews (Dec); Adam Burish (Jan); Duncan Keith (Jan); Patrick Kane (Apr)
- Arena: United Center
- Average attendance: 16,814 (82%); Total: 689,377

Team leaders
- Goals: Patrick Sharp (36)
- Assists: Patrick Kane (51)
- Points: Patrick Kane (72)
- Penalty minutes: Adam Burish (214)
- Plus/minus: Duncan Keith (+30)
- Wins: Nikolai Khabibulin (20)
- Goals against average: Nikolai Khabibulin (2.55)

The 2007–08 Chicago Blackhawks season was the 82nd season for the National Hockey League (NHL) franchise that was established on September 25, 1926. It began on October 4, 2007, against the Minnesota Wild. Chicago failed to qualify for the playoffs for the fifth consecutive season.

Key dates prior to the start of the season:

- The 2007 NHL entry draft took place in Columbus, Ohio, on June 22–23. The Blackhawks had the first overall selection – using it to select Patrick Kane of the London Knights.
- The free agency period began on July 1.
- Captain Adrian Aucoin is traded to the Calgary Flames.

== Regular season ==
On Saturday, November 17, 2007, the Blackhawks scored three short-handed goals in a 5–3 win over the Detroit Red Wings.

=== Divisional standings ===
Central Division
		GP	W	L	OTL	GF	GA	Pts
**1**	**p – Detroit Red Wings**	**82**	**54**	**21**	**7**	**257**	**184**	**115**
**2**	**Nashville Predators**	**82**	**41**	**32**	**9**	**230**	**229**	**91**
3	Chicago Blackhawks	82	40	34	8	239	235	88
4	Columbus Blue Jackets	82	34	36	12	193	218	80
5	St. Louis Blues	82	33	36	13	205	237	79

=== Conference standings ===
Western Conference
R		Div	GP	W	L	OTL	GF	GA	Pts
**1**	**p – Detroit Red Wings**	**CE**	**82**	**54**	**21**	**7**	**257**	**184**	115
**2**	**y – San Jose Sharks**	**PA**	**82**	**49**	**23**	**10**	**222**	**193**	108
**3**	**y – Minnesota Wild**	**NW**	**82**	**44**	**28**	**10**	**223**	**218**	98
**4**	**Anaheim Ducks**	**PA**	**82**	**47**	**27**	**8**	**205**	**191**	102
**5**	**Dallas Stars**	**PA**	**82**	**45**	**30**	**7**	**242**	**207**	97
**6**	**Colorado Avalanche**	**NW**	**82**	**44**	**31**	**7**	**231**	**219**	95
**7**	**Calgary Flames**	**NW**	**82**	**42**	**30**	**10**	**229**	**227**	94
**8**	**Nashville Predators**	**CE**	**82**	**41**	**32**	**9**	**230**	**229**	91
8.5
9	Edmonton Oilers	NW	82	41	35	6	235	251	88
10	Chicago Blackhawks	CE	82	40	34	8	239	235	88
11	Vancouver Canucks	NW	82	39	33	10	213	215	88
12	Phoenix Coyotes	PA	82	38	37	7	214	231	83
13	Columbus Blue Jackets	CE	82	34	36	12	193	218	80
14	St. Louis Blues	CE	82	33	36	13	205	237	79
15	Los Angeles Kings	PA	82	32	43	7	231	266	71

Divisions: PA – Pacific, CE – Central, NW – Northwest
bold – qualified for playoffs, y – division winner, p – Presidents' Trophy winner

== Schedule and results ==
2007–08 regular season
October: 6–6–0 (home: 3–4–0; road: 3–2–0)

Game	Date	Visitor	Score	Home	OT	Decision	Attendance	Record	Points	Recap
1	October 4	Chicago	0–1	Minnesota		Khabibulin	18,568	0–1–0	0	L
2	October 6	Detroit	3–4	Chicago	SO	Khabibulin	18,768	1–1–0	2	W
3	October 10	San Jose	2–1	Chicago		Khabibulin	10,122	1–2–0	2	L
4	October 12	Chicago	3–2	Detroit		Khabibulin	17,696	2–2–0	4	W
5	October 13	Dallas	1–2	Chicago	OT	Lalime	11,868	3–2–0	6	W
6	October 17	St. Louis	3–1	Chicago		Khabibulin	10,002	3–3–0	6	L
7	October 19	Colorado	3–5	Chicago		Khabibulin	13,519	4–3–0	8	W
8	October 20	Chicago	6–4	Toronto		Lalime	19,314	5–3–0	10	W
9	October 23	Columbus	7–4	Chicago		Khabibulin	10,884	5–4–0	10	L
10	October 25	Chicago	1–3	Boston		Khabibulin	10,290	5–5–0	10	L
11	October 27	Atlanta	3–2	Chicago		Lalime	15,789	5–6–0	10	L
12	October 31	Chicago	5–4	Dallas		Khabibulin	14,756	6–6–0	12	W

November: 8–3–2 (home: 5–1–0; road: 3–2–2)

Game	Date	Visitor	Score	Home	OT	Decision	Attendance	Record	Points	Recap
13	November 3	Chicago	3–2	St. Louis		Khabibulin	19,150	7–6–0	14	W
14	November 4	Nashville	5–2	Chicago		Khabibulin	12,086	7–7–0	14	L
15	November 7	Columbus	2–5	Chicago		Lalime	9,717	8–7–0	16	W
16	November 9	St. Louis	2–4	Chicago		Lalime	16,149	9–7–0	18	W
17	November 11	Detroit	2–3	Chicago		Khabibulin	19,045	10–7–0	20	W
18	November 14	Chicago	2–4	Columbus		Lalime	13,622	10–8–0	20	L
19	November 15	Chicago	4–5	Nashville	OT	Khabibulin	15,353	10–8–1	21	OTL
20	November 17	Chicago	5–3	Detroit		Khabibulin	20,066	11–8–1	23	W
21	November 22	Chicago	2–1	Calgary		Khabibulin	19,289	12–8–1	25	W
22	November 24	Chicago	2–3	Edmonton	SO	Khabibulin	16,839	12–8–2	26	OTL
23	November 25	Chicago	0–2	Vancouver		Lalime	18,630	12–9–2	26	L
24	November 28	Tampa Bay	1–5	Chicago		Khabibulin	11,122	13–9–2	28	W
25	November 30	Phoenix	1–6	Chicago		Khabibulin	16,234	14–9–2	30	W

December: 5–6–1 (home: 4–4–1; road: 1–2–0)

Game	Date	Visitor	Score	Home	OT	Decision	Attendance	Record	Points	Recap
26	December 1	Chicago	1–3	St. Louis		Lalime	19,150	14–10–2	30	L
27	December 5	Vancouver	3–2	Chicago		Khabibulin	12,444	14–11–2	30	L
28	December 7	Anaheim	5–3	Chicago		Khabibulin	17,734	14–12–2	30	L
29	December 9	Calgary	3–2	Chicago		Khabibulin	13,382	14–13–2	30	L
30	December 12	Los Angeles	6–3	Chicago		Khabibulin	12,534	15–13–2	32	W
31	December 15	Chicago	1–3	Buffalo		Khabibulin	18,690	15–14–2	32	L
32	December 16	Florida	3–1	Chicago		Lalime	12,926	15–15–2	32	L
33	December 19	Nashville	2–5	Chicago		Khabibulin	14,151	16–15–2	34	W
34	December 22	Chicago	4–3	Ottawa	OT	Khabibulin	20,171	17–15–2	36	W
35	December 23	Edmonton	2–3	Chicago		Khabibulin	20,151	18–15–2	38	W
36	December 26	Nashville	2–5	Chicago		Khabibulin	20,511	19–15–2	40	W
37	December 30	Los Angeles	3–2	Chicago	OT	Khabibulin	21,715	19–15–3	41	OTL

January: 4–9–1 (home: 1–4–0; road: 3–5–1)

Game	Date	Visitor	Score	Home	OT	Decision	Attendance	Record	Points	Recap
38	January 1	Chicago	2–9	Los Angeles		Khabibulin	16,916	19–16–3	41	L
39	January 3	Chicago	2–4	Phoenix		Khabibulin	12,252	19–17–3	41	L
40	January 4	Chicago	1–2	Anaheim		Khabibulin	17,174	19–18–3	41	L
41	January 6	Detroit	3–1	Chicago		Khabibulin	21,869	19–19–3	41	L
42	January 8	Chicago	3–4	Montreal	OT	Lalime	21,273	19–19–4	42	OTL
43	January 9	Dallas	3–1	Chicago		Khabibulin	15,469	19–20–4	42	L
44	January 11	Minnesota	5–2	Chicago		Khabibulin	21,139	19–21–4	42	L
45	January 13	Chicago	3–2	Nashville	SO	Lalime	12,484	20–21–4	44	W
46	January 16	St. Louis	1–6	Chicago		Lalime	17,570	21–21–4	46	W
47	January 18	Chicago	2–1	Colorado	SO	Lalime	18,007	22–21–4	48	W
48	January 19	Chicago	2–1	Phoenix	SO	Lalime	18,073	23–21–4	50	W
49	January 22	Chicago	2–3	San Jose		Lalime	17,136	23–22–4	50	L
50	January 24	Columbus	1–0	Chicago		Khabibulin	16,094	23–23–4	50	L
51	January 30	Chicago	3–6	Colorado		Khabibulin	15,348	23–24–4	50	L

February: 7–4–2 (home: 3–0–0; road: 4–4–2)

Game	Date	Visitor	Score	Home	OT	Decision	Attendance	Record	Points	Recap
52	February 2	Chicago	2–3	San Jose	SO	Khabibulin	17,496	23–24–5	51	OTL
53	February 6	Chicago	1–4	Edmonton		Lalime	16,839	23–25–5	51	L
54	February 7	Chicago	3–1	Calgary		Khabibulin	19,289	24–25–5	53	W
55	February 10	Chicago	2–3	Vancouver	SO	Khabibulin	18,630	24–25–6	54	OTL
56	February 13	Chicago	7–2	Columbus		Khabibulin	14,918	25–25–6	56	W
57	February 14	Chicago	6–1	Nashville		Lalime	16,937	26–25–6	58	W
58	February 17	Colorado	1–2	Chicago		Lalime	21,715	27–25–6	60	W
59	February 19	Chicago	1–5	St. Louis		Lalime	19,150	27–26–6	60	L
60	February 20	Minnesota	0–3	Chicago		Khabibulin	17,812	28–26–6	62	W
61	February 23	Chicago	6–5	Los Angeles	OT	Lalime	18,118	29–26–6	64	W
62	February 24	Chicago	3–6	Anaheim		Lalime	17,174	29–27–6	64	L
63	February 27	Phoenix	0–1	Chicago		Lalime	14,799	30–27–6	66	W
64	February 28	Chicago	4–7	Dallas		Lalime	18,584	30–28–6	66	L

March: 8–5–2 (home: 5–3–1; road: 3–2–1)

Game	Date	Visitor	Score	Home	OT	Decision	Attendance	Record	Points	Recap
65	March 2	Vancouver	1–4	Chicago		Lalime	19,670	31–28–6	68	W
66	March 4	Chicago	4–2	Minnesota		Lalime	18,568	32–28–6	70	W
67	March 5	Anaheim	0–3	Chicago		Crawford	16,666	33–28–6	72	W
68	March 7	San Jose	3–2	Chicago		Lalime	21,908	33–29–6	72	L
69	March 9	Edmonton	6–5	Chicago	OT	Lalime	20,619	33–29–7	73	OTL
70	March 11	Chicago	1–3	Detroit		Crawford	18,632	33–30–7	73	L
71	March 12	Carolina	3–0	Chicago		Crawford	18,210	33–31–7	73	L
72	March 14	Chicago	6–3	Columbus		Lalime	15,699	34–31–7	75	W
73	March 16	Calgary	4–2	Chicago		Lalime	20,717	34–32–7	75	L
74	March 19	Washington	0–5	Chicago		Khabibulin	20,942	35–32–7	77	W
75	March 22	Chicago	1–2	Nashville	SO	Khabibulin	17,113	35–32–8	78	OTL
76	March 23	St. Louis	3–4	Chicago	OT	Khabibulin	19,146	36–32–8	80	W
77	March 26	Chicago	0–4	Columbus		Khabibulin	14,454	36–33–8	80	L
78	March 29	Chicago	4–3	St. Louis		Lalime	19,150	37–33–8	82	W
79	March 30	Columbus	4–5	Chicago	SO	Khabibulin	20,885	38–33–8	84	W

April: 2–1–0 (home: 2–0–0; road: 0–1–0)

Game	Date	Visitor	Score	Home	OT	Decision	Attendance	Record	Points	Recap
80	April 2	Detroit	2–6	Chicago		Khabibulin	21,365	39–33–8	86	W
81	April 4	Nashville	1–3	Chicago		Lalime	21,929	40–33–8	88	W
82	April 6	Chicago	1–4	Detroit		Khabibulin	20,066	40–34–8	88	L

Legend: W Win (2 points) L Loss (0 points) OTL Overtime/shootout loss (1 point)

== Player statistics ==
=== Skaters ===
Note: GP = Games played; G = Goals; A = Assists; Pts = Points; PIM = Penalty minutes

	Regular season					Playoffs
Player	GP	G	A	Pts	PIM	GP	G	A	Pts	PIM
Patrick Kane	76	21	51	72	50
Patrick Sharp	74	36	26	62	49
Robert Lang	71	21	33	54	44
Jonathan Toews	64	24	30	54	38
Dustin Byfuglien	63	19	17	36	55
Jason Williams	19	7	11	18	10
Andrew Ladd	57	14	16	30	31
Duncan Keith	76	12	20	32	44
Martin Havlat	37	10	17	27	22
Brent Seabrook	76	9	18	17	85

=== Goaltenders ===
Note: GP = Games played; TOI = Time on ice (minutes); W = Wins; L = Losses; OT = Overtime/shootout losses; GA = Goals against; SO = Shutouts; SV% = Save percentage; GAA = Goals against average

	Regular season									Playoffs
Player	GP	TOI	W	L	OT	GA	SO	SV%	GAA	GP	TOI	W	L	GA	SO	SV%	GAA
Nikolai Khabibulin	45	2,587	20	18	6	110	2	.910	2.55
Patrick Lalime	31	1,768	15	12	2	85	1	.894	2.88

== Awards and records ==
=== Milestones ===
Regular season
Player	Milestone	Reached
Patrick Kane; Magnus Johansson	1st NHL game	October 4, 2007
Robert Lang	800th NHL game	October 4, 2007
Patrick Kane; Magnus Johansson	1st NHL assist 1st NHL point	October 6, 2007
Jonathan Toews	1st NHL game 1st NHL goal 1st NHL point	October 10, 2007
Sergei Samsonov	600th NHL game	October 12, 2007
Patrick Sharp	200th NHL game	October 12, 2007
Jonathan Toews	1st NHL assist	October 12, 2007
Patrick Kane	1st NHL goal	October 19, 2007
Dave Bolland	1st NHL assist 1st NHL point	October 31, 2007
Jim Vandermeer	200th NHL game	October 31, 2007

== Transactions ==
The Blackhawks have been involved in the following transactions during the 2007–08 season.

=== Trades ===
June 16, 2007	To Montreal Canadiens Jassen Cullimore; Tony Salmelainen	To Chicago Blackhawks Sergei Samsonov
June 22, 2007	To Calgary Flames Adrian Aucoin; Seventh-round pick in 2007	To Chicago Blackhawks Andrei Zyuzin; Steve Marr
August 11, 2007	To Chicago Blackhawks Kevyn Adams	To Phoenix Coyotes Radim Vrbata
October 11, 2007	To Chicago Blackhawks Conditional seventh-round pick in 2008	To New York Rangers P. A. Parenteau
December 18, 2007	To Chicago Blackhawks Ben Eager	To Philadelphia Flyers Jim Vandermeer
January 17, 2008	To Chicago Blackhawks Craig Adams	To Carolina Hurricanes Conditional draft pick in 2009.
February 26, 2008	To Chicago Blackhawks Sixth-round pick in 2008	To Ottawa Senators Martin Lapointe
February 26, 2008	To Chicago Blackhawks Andrew Ladd	To Carolina Hurricanes Tuomo Ruutu

=== Free agents ===
Player	Former team	Contract terms
Yanic Perreault	Toronto Maple Leafs	1 year, $1.5 million
Robert Lang	Detroit Red Wings	2 years, $8 million
Wade Flaherty	Vancouver Canucks	

Player	New team
Jeff Hamilton	Carolina Hurricanes
Craig MacDonald	Tampa Bay Lightning
Michal Handzus	Los Angeles Kings

== Draft picks ==
Chicago's picks at the 2007 NHL entry draft in Columbus, Ohio. The Blackhawks had the first overall pick in the draft.

Round	#	Player	Position	Nationality	College/Junior/Club team (League)
1	1	Patrick Kane	Right wing	United States	London Knights (OHL)
2	38	Bill Sweatt	Left wing	United States	Colorado College (WCHA)
2	56	Akim Aliu	Center	Canada	Sudbury Wolves (OHL)
3	69	Maxime Tanguay	Center	Canada	Rimouski Océanic (QMJHL)
3	86	Josh Unice	Goaltender	United States	Kitchener Rangers (OHL)
5	126	Joe Lavin	Defense	United States	U.S. National Team Development Program (NAHL)
6	156	Richard Greenop	Center	Canada	Windsor Spitfires (OHL)

== Farm teams ==
=== Rockford IceHogs ===
The Rockford IceHogs, who will be moving up from the United Hockey League, are the new American Hockey League affiliate of the Blackhawks in 2007–08.

=== Toledo Walleye ===
The Toledo Walleye are the Blackhawks affiliate in the ECHL.

== See also ==
- 2007–08 NHL season
