= 2007–08 Phoenix Coyotes season =

NHL hockey team season

2007–08 Phoenix Coyotes
- Division: 4th Pacific
- Conference: 12th Western
- 2007–08 record: 38–37–7
- Home record: 17–20–4
- Road record: 21–17–3
- Goals for: 214
- Goals against: 231

Team information
- General manager: Don Maloney
- Coach: Wayne Gretzky
- Captain: Shane Doan
- Alternate captains: Ed Jovanovski; Derek Morris; Steven Reinprecht
- Arena: Jobing.com Arena
- Average attendance: 14,820 (83.3%)

Team leaders
- Goals: Shane Doan (28)
- Assists: Shane Doan (50)
- Points: Shane Doan (78)
- Penalty minutes: Daniel Carcillo (324)
- Plus/minus: Zbynek Michalek (+9)
- Wins: Ilya Bryzgalov (26)
- Goals against average: Ilya Bryzgalov (2.42)

The 2007–08 Phoenix Coyotes season began on October 4, 2007. It was the franchise's 36th season, 29th in the National Hockey League (NHL) and 12th season as the Phoenix Coyotes. The Coyotes failed to qualify for the playoffs for the fifth consecutive season.

Key dates prior to the start of the season:

- The 2007 NHL entry draft took place in Columbus, Ohio, on June 22–23.
- The free agency period began on July 1.

== Regular season ==
=== Divisional standings ===
Pacific Division
		GP	W	L	OTL	GF	GA	Pts
**1**	**y – San Jose Sharks**	**82**	**49**	**23**	**10**	**222**	**193**	**108**
**2**	**Anaheim Ducks**	**82**	**47**	**27**	**8**	**205**	**191**	**102**
**3**	**Dallas Stars**	**82**	**45**	**30**	**7**	**242**	**207**	**97**
4	Phoenix Coyotes	82	38	37	7	214	231	83
5	Los Angeles Kings	82	32	43	7	231	266	71

=== Conference standings ===
Western Conference
R		Div	GP	W	L	OTL	GF	GA	Pts
**1**	**p – Detroit Red Wings**	**CE**	**82**	**54**	**21**	**7**	**257**	**184**	115
**2**	**y – San Jose Sharks**	**PA**	**82**	**49**	**23**	**10**	**222**	**193**	108
**3**	**y – Minnesota Wild**	**NW**	**82**	**44**	**28**	**10**	**223**	**218**	98
**4**	**Anaheim Ducks**	**PA**	**82**	**47**	**27**	**8**	**205**	**191**	102
**5**	**Dallas Stars**	**PA**	**82**	**45**	**30**	**7**	**242**	**207**	97
**6**	**Colorado Avalanche**	**NW**	**82**	**44**	**31**	**7**	**231**	**219**	95
**7**	**Calgary Flames**	**NW**	**82**	**42**	**30**	**10**	**229**	**227**	94
**8**	**Nashville Predators**	**CE**	**82**	**41**	**32**	**9**	**230**	**229**	91
8.5
9	Edmonton Oilers	NW	82	41	35	6	235	251	88
10	Chicago Blackhawks	CE	82	40	34	8	239	235	88
11	Vancouver Canucks	NW	82	39	33	10	213	215	88
12	Phoenix Coyotes	PA	82	38	37	7	214	231	83
13	Columbus Blue Jackets	CE	82	34	36	12	193	218	80
14	St. Louis Blues	CE	82	33	36	13	205	237	79
15	Los Angeles Kings	PA	82	32	43	7	231	266	71

Divisions: PA – Pacific, CE – Central, NW – Northwest
bold – qualified for playoffs, y – division winner, p – Presidents' Trophy winner

== Schedule and results ==
2007–08 regular season
October: 4–6–0 (home: 1–5–0; road: 3–1–0)

Game	Date	Visitor	Score	Home	OT	Decision	Attendance	Record	Points	Recap
1	October 4	St. Louis	2 – 3	Phoenix		Tellqvist	17,799	1–0–0	2	W
2	October 6	Boston	3 – 1	Phoenix		Tellqvist	14,087	1–1–0	2	L
3	October 10	Phoenix	0 – 3	Columbus		Aebischer	11,944	1–2–0	2	L
4	October 11	Phoenix	6 – 3	Nashville		Auld	12,155	2–2–0	4	W
5	October 13	Minnesota	3 – 2	Phoenix		Auld	12,088	2–3–0	4	L
6	October 18	Edmonton	4 – 2	Phoenix		Auld	10,448	2–4–0	4	L
7	October 20	Detroit	5 – 2	Phoenix		Tellqvist	14,154	2–5–0	4	L
8	October 25	Phoenix	1 – 0	Anaheim		Auld	17,174	3–5–0	6	W
9	October 27	Dallas	5 – 3	Phoenix		Auld	13,741	3–6–0	6	L
10	October 30	Phoenix	2 – 1	St. Louis		Tellqvist	14,222	4–6–0	8	W

November: 7–6–0 (home: 3–2–0; road: 4–4–0)

Game	Date	Visitor	Score	Home	OT	Decision	Attendance	Record	Points	Recap
11	November 2	Phoenix	5 – 0	Dallas		Tellqvist	18,203	5–6–0	10	W
12	November 3	Anaheim	5 – 2	Phoenix		Auld	15,888	5–7–0	10	L
13	November 7	Phoenix	6 – 5	Anaheim	OT	Auld	17,174	6–7–0	12	W
14	November 8	Dallas	2 – 5	Phoenix		Tellqvist	12,027	7–7–0	14	W
15	November 10	Phoenix	1 – 4	San Jose		Auld	17,496	7–8–0	14	L
16	November 12	Phoenix	0 – 5	San Jose		Tellqvist	17,496	7–9–0	14	L
17	November 15	San Jose	6 – 0	Phoenix		Auld	12,953	7–10–0	14	L
18	November 17	Phoenix	1 – 0	Los Angeles		Bryzgalov	15,659	8–10–0	16	W
19	November 21	Los Angeles	1 – 4	Phoenix		Bryzgalov	12,161	9–10–0	18	W
20	November 23	Phoenix	4 – 3	Anaheim	SO	Bryzgalov	17,174	10–10–0	20	W
21	November 24	Toronto	1 – 5	Phoenix		Bryzgalov	17,190	11–10–0	22	W
22	November 28	Phoenix	1 – 3	Minnesota		Bryzgalov	18,568	11–11–0	22	L
23	November 30	Phoenix	1 – 6	Chicago		Bryzgalov	16,234	11–12–0	22	L

December: 7–6–1 (home: 2–3–1; road: 5–3–0)

Game	Date	Visitor	Score	Home	OT	Decision	Attendance	Record	Points	Recap
24	December 1	Phoenix	2 – 3	Detroit		Bryzgalov	18,557	11–13–0	22	L
25	December 3	Phoenix	1 – 3	Pittsburgh		Bryzgalov	16,979	11–14–0	22	L
26	December 5	Los Angeles	1 – 4	Phoenix		Bryzgalov	11,401	12–14–0	24	W
27	December 7	San Jose	1 – 0	Phoenix		Bryzgalov	12,972	12–15–0	24	L
28	December 8	Phoenix	4 – 2	Los Angeles		Bryzgalov	16,053	13–15–0	26	W
29	December 13	Phoenix	2 – 3	NY Islanders		Bryzgalov	9,581	13–16–0	26	L
30	December 15	Phoenix	4 – 1	New Jersey		Tellqvist	16,636	14–16–0	28	W
31	December 16	Phoenix	5 – 1	NY Rangers		Bryzgalov	18,200	15–16–0	30	W
32	December 18	Phoenix	3 – 2	Philadelphia		Bryzgalov	19,211	16–16–0	32	W
33	December 20	Phoenix	3 – 2	San Jose	SO	Bryzgalov	17,136	17–16–0	34	W
34	December 22	Vancouver	2 – 1	Phoenix	SO	Bryzgalov	17,471	17–16–1	35	OTL
35	December 27	Minnesota	3 – 2	Phoenix		Bryzgalov	13,756	17–17–1	35	L
36	December 29	Detroit	4 – 2	Phoenix		Bryzgalov	17,866	17–18–1	35	L
37	December 31	Colorado	4 – 3	Phoenix	SO	Bryzgalov	12,973	18–18–1	37	W

January: 9–4–1 (home: 5–1–1; road: 4–3–0)

Game	Date	Visitor	Score	Home	OT	Decision	Attendance	Record	Points	Recap
38	January 2	Phoenix	5 – 2	Colorado		Bryzgalov	15,232	19–18–1	39	W
39	January 3	Chicago	2 – 4	Phoenix		Tellqvist	12,252	20–18–1	41	W
40	January 5	Anaheim	2 – 3	Phoenix	SO	Bryzgalov	16,159	21–18–1	43	W
41	January 8	Phoenix	3 – 1	Calgary		Bryzgalov	19,289	22–18–1	45	W
42	January 10	Phoenix	2 – 5	Edmonton		Bryzgalov	16,839	22–19–1	45	L
43	January 11	Phoenix	4 – 3	Vancouver		Bryzgalov	18,630	23–19–1	47	W
44	January 13	Phoenix	1 – 4	Minnesota		Bryzgalov	18,568	23–20–1	47	L
45	January 15	San Jose	3 – 5	Phoenix		Bryzgalov	11,822	24–20–1	49	W
46	January 17	Columbus	4 – 3	Phoenix		Tellqvist	11,114	24–21–1	49	L
47	January 19	Chicago	2 – 1	Phoenix	SO	Bryzgalov	18,073	24–21–2	50	OTL
48	January 21	Buffalo	2 – 6	Phoenix		Bryzgalov	16,981	25–21–2	52	W
49	January 24	Nashville	3 – 4	Phoenix	OT	Bryzgalov	12,622	26–21–2	54	W
50	January 29	Phoenix	4 – 2	Columbus		Bryzgalov	15,127	27–21–2	56	W
51	January 30	Phoenix	2 – 3	Detroit		Bryzgalov	19,289	27–22–2	56	L

February: 6–5–3 (home: 3–3–1; road: 3–2–2)

Game	Date	Visitor	Score	Home	OT	Decision	Attendance	Record	Points	Recap
52	February 2	Phoenix	2 – 3	Nashville	OT	Bryzgalov	17,113	27–22–3	57	OTL
53	February 4	Phoenix	4 – 3	Colorado	OT	Tellqvist	14,381	28–22–3	59	W
54	February 5	Phoenix	3 – 4	Calgary	SO	Bryzgalov	19,289	28–22–4	60	OTL
55	February 7	Columbus	2 – 1	Phoenix		Bryzgalov	13,918	28–23–4	60	L
56	February 10	Nashville	6 – 3	Phoenix		Tellqvist	14,593	28–24–4	60	L
57	February 11	Phoenix	1 – 2	Dallas		Bryzgalov	17,622	28–25–4	60	L
58	February 14	Dallas	2 – 5	Phoenix		Bryzgalov	12,885	29–25–4	62	W
59	February 16	Los Angeles	3 – 5	Phoenix		Bryzgalov	17,997	30–25–4	64	W
60	February 18	Phoenix	4 – 0	Los Angeles		Tellqvist	16,617	31–25–4	66	W
61	February 19	Calgary	4 – 1	Phoenix		Bryzgalov	15,208	31–26–4	66	L
62	February 22	Colorado	3 – 2	Phoenix	SO	Tellqvist	15,882	31–26–5	67	OTL
63	February 24	St. Louis	0 – 2	Phoenix		Bryzgalov	14,845	32–26–5	69	W
64	February 27	Phoenix	0 –1	Chicago		Bryzgalov	14,799	32–27–5	69	L
65	February 28	Phoenix	2 – 1	St. Louis		Bryzgalov	17,867	33–27–5	71	W

March: 4–9–1 (home: 3–5–1; road: 1–4–0)

Game	Date	Visitor	Score	Home	OT	Decision	Attendance	Record	Points	Recap
66	March 1	Calgary	3 – 1	Phoenix		Bryzgalov	17,529	33–28–5	71	L
67	March 5	Phoenix	2 – 1	Dallas		Bryzgalov	17,942	34–28–5	73	W
68	March 6	Montreal	4 – 2	Phoenix		Tellqvist	14,841	34–29–5	73	L
69	March 8	Ottawa	4 – 2	Phoenix		Bryzgalov	16,922	34–30–5	73	L
70	March 11	Anaheim	2 – 3	Phoenix	SO	Bryzgalov	14,683	35–30–5	75	W
71	March 13	Vancouver	0 – 2	Phoenix		Bryzgalov	15,562	36–30–5	77	W
72	March 15	Edmonton	5 – 2	Phoenix		Bryzgalov	17,947	36–31–5	77	L
73	March 17	Phoenix	1 – 3	Vancouver		Bryzgalov	18,630	36–32–5	77	L
74	March 18	Phoenix	4 – 8	Edmonton		Tellqvist	16,839	36–33–5	77	L
75	March 20	Los Angeles	6 – 5	Phoenix	SO	Tellqvist	14,852	36–33–6	78	OTL
76	March 22	Anaheim	2 – 1	Phoenix		Bryzgalov	17,645	36–34–6	78	L
77	March 25	San Jose	4 – 5	Phoenix	OT	Bryzgalov	15,991	37–34–6	80	W
78	March 27	Phoenix	0 – 4	Los Angeles		Tellqvist	17,331	37–35–6	80	L
79	March 30	Phoenix	1 – 3	San Jose		Bryzgalov	17,496	37–36–6	80	L

April: 1–1–1 (home: 0–1–0; road: 1–0–1)

Game	Date	Visitor	Score	Home	OT	Decision	Attendance	Record	Points	Recap
80	April 3	Dallas	4 – 2	Phoenix		Bryzgalov	18,340	37–37–6	80	L
81	April 4	Phoenix	4 – 2	Dallas		Tellqvist	18,584	38–37–6	82	W
82	April 6	Phoenix	2 – 3	Anaheim	SO	Bryzgalov	17,269	38–37–7	83	OTL

Legend: W Win (2 points) L Loss (0 points) OTL Overtime/shootout loss (1 point)

== Player statistics ==
=== Skaters ===
Note: GP = Games played; G = Goals; A = Assists; Pts = Points; PIM = Penalty minutes

	Regular season
Player	GP	G	A	Pts	PIM
Shane Doan	80	28	50	78	59
Radim Vrbata	76	27	29	56	14
Ed Jovanovski	80	12	39	51	73
Steven Reinprecht	81	16	30	46	26
Martin Hanzal	72	8	27	35	28
Peter Mueller	81	22	32	54	32
Fredrik Sjostrom	51	10	9	19	14
Niko Kapanen	79	10	18	28	34
Daniel Carcillo	57	13	11	24	324
Mike York	63	6	8	14	4

=== Goaltenders ===
Note: GP = Games played; TOI = Time on ice (minutes); W = Wins; L = Losses; OT = Overtime/shootout losses; GA = Goals against; SO = Shutouts; Sv% = Save percentage; GAA = Goals against average

	Regular season
Player	GP	TOI	W	L	OT	SO	Sv%	GA	GAA
Ilya Bryzgalov	55	3167	26	22	5	3	.921	128	2.42
Mikael Tellqvist	22	1224	9	8	2	2	.908	56	2.74
Alex Auld	9	509	3	6	0	1	.880	30	3.54
David Aebischer	1	60	0	1	0	0	.909	3	3.00

== Awards and records ==
=== Milestones ===
For the second straight season, the Phoenix Coyotes are last in revenue in the NHL, losing $300,000 a game, or $30 million this season. Phoenix has never had a money-making season since the franchise left the city of Winnipeg in the 1996–97 season.

== Transactions ==
The Coyotes have been involved in the following transactions during the 2007–08 season.

=== Trades ===
August 11, 2007	To Chicago Blackhawks Kevyn Adams	To Phoenix Coyotes Radim Vrbata

=== Free Agents ===
Player	Former team	Contract Terms
Mike York	Philadelphia Flyers	1 year, $1 million
Jon DiSalvatore	St. Louis Blues	1 year, $525,000
Joey Tenute	Washington Capitals	1 year, $475,000
David Aebischer	Montreal Canadiens	1 year, $600,000
Matt Murley	Pittsburgh Penguins	
Craig Weller	New York Rangers	1 year, $475,000

Player	New team
Owen Nolan	Calgary Flames
Matthew Spiller	New York Islanders
Jeff Taffe	Pittsburgh Penguins

=== Waivers ===
November 17, 2007	To Phoenix Coyotes Ilya Bryzgalov	To Anaheim Ducks claimed off waivers

== Draft picks ==
Phoenix' picks at the 2007 NHL entry draft in Columbus, Ohio.

Round	#	Player	Position	Nationality	College/Junior/Club team (League)
1	3	Kyle Turris	Center	Canada	Burnaby Express (BCHL)
1	30	Nick Ross	Defense	Canada	Regina Pats (WHL)
2	32	Brett MacLean	Left wing	Canada	Oshawa Generals (OHL)
2	36	Joel Gistedt	Goaltender	Sweden	Frölunda HC (Elitserien)
4	103	Vladimir Ruzicka	Center	Czech Republic	Slavia Prague (Czech Republic)
5	123	Maxim Goncharov	Defense	Russia	CSKA Moscow-2 (Russia)
6	153	Scott Darling	Goaltender	United States	Capital District Selects (EJHL)

== Farm teams ==
San Antonio Rampage

The San Antonio Rampage are the Coyotes American Hockey League affiliate in 2007–08.

Arizona Sundogs

The Arizona Sundogs are the Coyotes affiliate in the CHL.

== See also ==
- 2007–08 NHL season
