= Josh Harding =

Canadian ice hockey player (born 1984)

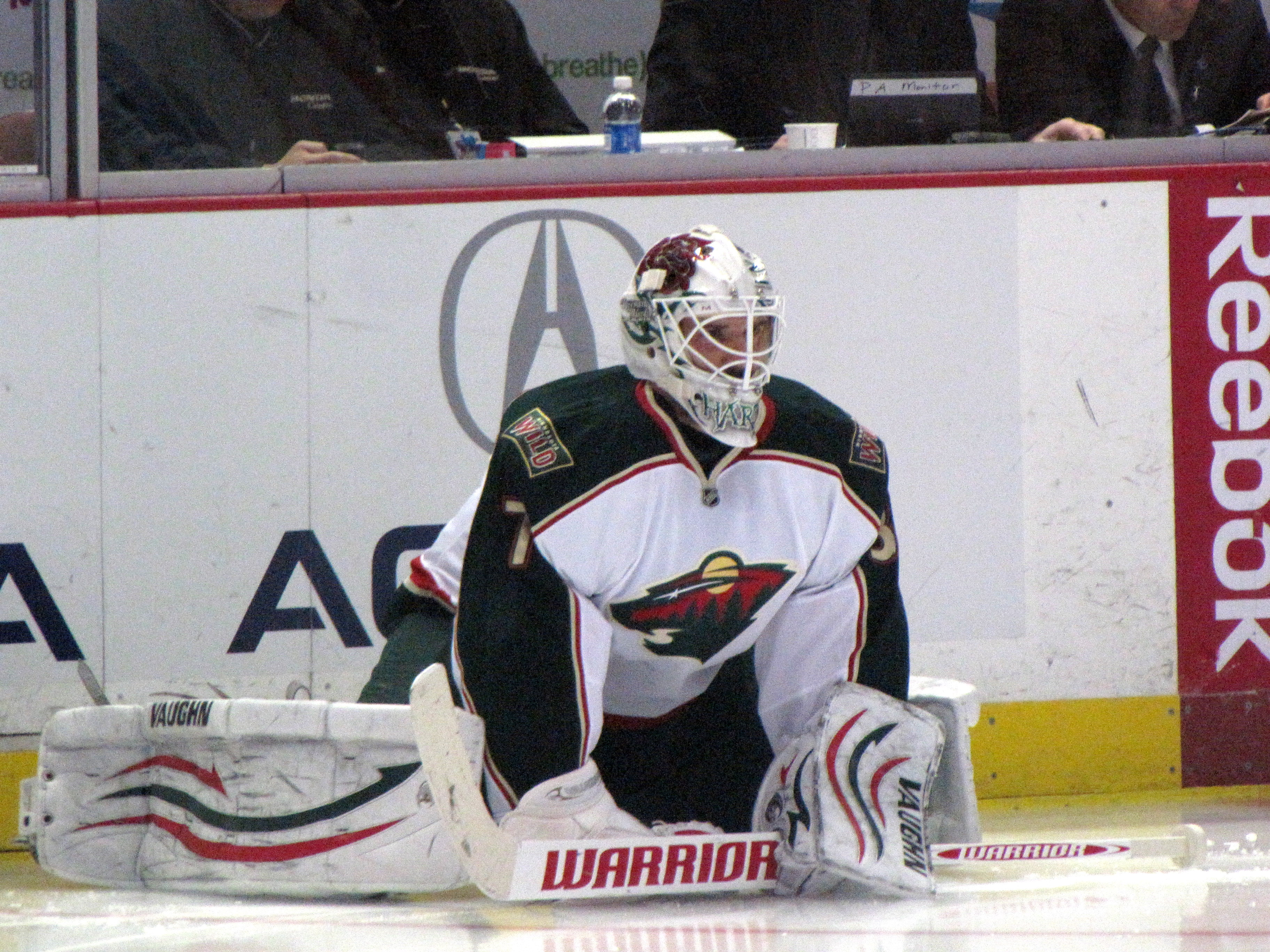
- Harding with the Minnesota Wild in December 2011
- Born: June 18, 1984 (age 42) Regina, Saskatchewan, Canada
- Height: 6 ft 1 in (185 cm)
- Weight: 197 lb (89 kg; 14 st 1 lb)
- Position: Goaltender
- Caught: Right
- Played for: Minnesota Wild
- National team: Canada
- NHL draft: 38th overall, 2002; Minnesota Wild
- Playing career: 2004–2015

Joshua Joel Harding (born June 18, 1984) is a Canadian former professional ice hockey goaltender who played in the National Hockey League (NHL) for the Minnesota Wild.

== Playing career ==
Harding played three seasons of junior ice hockey in the Western Hockey League (WHL) with the Regina Pats and Brandon Wheat Kings. He won the Del Wilson and Four Broncos Memorial trophies in 2003 as the WHL's top goaltender and most outstanding player respectively. He was selected in the second round, 38th overall, of the 2002 NHL entry draft by the Minnesota Wild. He began his professional career with the Houston Aeros of the American Hockey League (AHL), the Wild's top minor league affiliate. In the 2004–05 season, his rookie season with the Aeros, he posted a 21–16–3 record with a 2.01 goals against average (GAA).

Harding was called up to the Wild on March 8, 2006, after goaltender Dwayne Roloson was traded to the Edmonton Oilers. Before being called up, Harding had a 27–8–0 record with a .923% save percentage (second best in the AHL) in the Aeros' 2005–06 season. He finished the season with a 29–8–0 record for the Aeros. He appeared in three games with the Wild in 2005–06, going 2–1–0 with a 2.59 GAA.

Harding began the 2006–07 season with the Aeros, compiling a 17–15–4 record before being recalled by the Wild on January 24, 2007. Harding recorded a 30-save, 5–0 shutout against the Oilers on March 1, 2007.

On October 14, 2007, Harding stopped 37 shots in his first game of the season, shutting-out the Anaheim Ducks 2–0. He compiled an 11–15 record in the 2007–08 NHL season, recording a 2.94 GAA. He played less during the 2008–09 season, going 3–11 but posting an improved 2.21 GAA.

On September 24, 2010, Harding tore the Anterior cruciate ligament (ACL) and medial collateral ligament (MCL) in his right knee in a pre-season game against the St. Louis Blues that forced him to miss the entire 2010–11 season. Despite this, on July 1, 2011, Harding signed a one-year contract extension with the Wild.

On June 19, 2012, Harding signed a three-year, $5.7 million contract extension with Minnesota. On November 28, during the 2012–13 NHL lockout, it was reported that Harding had been diagnosed with multiple sclerosis (MS). He kept the ailment, which can cause blurred vision and affect balance and coordination, a secret for over a month after doctors discovered the disease in late September 2012. In his first game back post-diagnosis, on January 20, 2013, Harding stopped all 24 shots he faced in a 1–0 shutout win over the Dallas Stars.

During the first round of the 2013 Stanley Cup playoffs against the Presidents' Trophy-winning Chicago Blackhawks as the eighth seed, Wild starting goaltender Niklas Bäckström injured himself during warm ups before Game 1. Harding would replace him in a 2–1 overtime loss, stopping 35 shots. This brought praise from his teammates as well as opponents for his incredible play despite being affected by multiple sclerosis. The Wild would lose the series 4–1, but Harding would win the Bill Masterton Memorial Trophy in recognition of his efforts.

Harding enjoyed an exceptional beginning of the 2013–14 season, leading the league in goals against average and save percentage through December 2013. But his season ended when he had to be placed on the injured reserve due to a modification of his MS treatment protocol.

Harding was expected to compete for the starting goaltender position for the Wild in the 2014–15 season, but a broken foot suffered in the off-season derailed those plans. Months later, upon being activated from injured reserve, the Wild placed Harding on waivers and assigned him to their AHL affiliate, the Iowa Wild. In his second game of the season playing for Iowa, Harding suffered from dehydration, which was related to his multiple sclerosis, and had to be hospitalized. He subsequently retired from professional ice hockey and went to work as a high school goaltender instructor for the Edina Hornets in Edina, Minnesota.

== International play ==
Harding made his international debut at the junior level for Canada in the 2004 World Juniors, helping claim a championship silver medal. At the completion of the 2008–09 season, Harding was selected to make his full senior debut with the Canada senior team at the 2009 IIHF World Championship. He helped guide the Canadians to capture a silver medal.

== Personal life ==
Harding was diagnosed with multiple sclerosis in November 2012, while training during the 2012–13 NHL lockout. Harding lives in Edina, Minnesota with his wife and their two children. Through his marriage, Harding has a stepson.

== Career statistics ==
=== Regular season and playoffs ===
			Regular season									Playoffs
Season	Team	League	GP	W	L	T/OT	MIN	GA	SO	GAA	SV%	GP	W	L	MIN	GA	SO	GAA	SV%
2001–02	Regina Pats	WHL	42	27	13	1	2,389	95	4	2.39	.906	6	2	4	325	16	0	2.95	.890
2002–03	Regina Pats	WHL	57	18	24	13	3,385	155	3	2.75	.914	5	1	4	321	13	0	2.43	.939
2003–04	Regina Pats	WHL	28	12	14	2	1,665	67	2	2.41	.927	—	—	—	—	—	—	—	—
2003–04	Brandon Wheat Kings	WHL	27	13	11	3	1,612	65	5	2.42	.920	11	5	6	660	36	0	3.27	.897
2004–05	Houston Aeros	AHL	42	21	16	3	2,387	80	4	2.01	.930	2	0	2	119	8	0	4.03	.893
2005–06	Houston Aeros	AHL	38	29	8	0	2,215	99	2	2.68	.919	8	4	4	476	30	0	3.79	.886
2005–06	Minnesota Wild	NHL	3	2	1	0	185	8	1	2.59	.904	—	—	—	—	—	—	—	—
2006–07	Houston Aeros	AHL	38	17	16	4	2,270	94	1	2.48	.920	—	—	—	—	—	—	—	—
2006–07	Minnesota Wild	NHL	7	3	2	1	361	7	1	1.16	.960	—	—	—	—	—	—	—	—
2007–08	Minnesota Wild	NHL	29	11	15	2	1,571	77	1	2.94	.908	1	0	0	20	0	0	0.00	1.000
2008–09	Minnesota Wild	NHL	19	3	9	1	870	32	0	2.21	.929	—	—	—	—	—	—	—	—
2009–10	Minnesota Wild	NHL	25	9	12	0	1,300	66	1	3.05	.900	—	—	—	—	—	—	—	—
2011–12	Minnesota Wild	NHL	34	13	12	4	1,855	81	2	2.62	.917	—	—	—	—	—	—	—	—
2012–13	Minnesota Wild	NHL	5	1	1	0	185	10	1	3.24	.863	5	1	4	245	12	0	2.94	.911
2012–13	Houston Aeros	AHL	2	1	1	0	100	5	0	3.00	.918	—	—	—	—	—	—	—	—
2013–14	Minnesota Wild	NHL	29	18	7	3	1,668	46	3	1.65	.933	—	—	—	—	—	—	—	—
2014–15	Iowa Wild	AHL	2	0	1	1	107	6	0	3.37	.920	—	—	—	—	—	—	—	—
NHL totals			151	60	59	11	7,994	327	10	2.45	.918	6	1	4	265	12	0	2.72	.918

== Awards and honours ==
Award	Year	Ref
WHL
East Second All-Star Team	2001–02	
WHL Player of the Month (December)	2002–03	
WHL East First All-Star Team	2002–03	
Four Broncos Memorial Trophy	2002–03	
WHL Del Wilson Trophy	2002–03	
AHL
All-Star Game	2006 (DNP)	
NHL
Bill Masterton Memorial Trophy	2013	

== Records ==
- Houston Aeros' franchise record for saves in a single game (56)

Awards and achievements
Preceded by Cam Ward	Winner of the Del Wilson Trophy; 2003	Succeeded by Cam Ward
Preceded by Dan Hamhuis	Winner of the Four Broncos Memorial Trophy; 2003	Succeeded by Cam Ward
Preceded by Max Pacioretty	Winner of the Bill Masterton Memorial Trophy; 2013	Succeeded by Dominic Moore
