= Harri Ilvonen =

Finnish ice hockey player

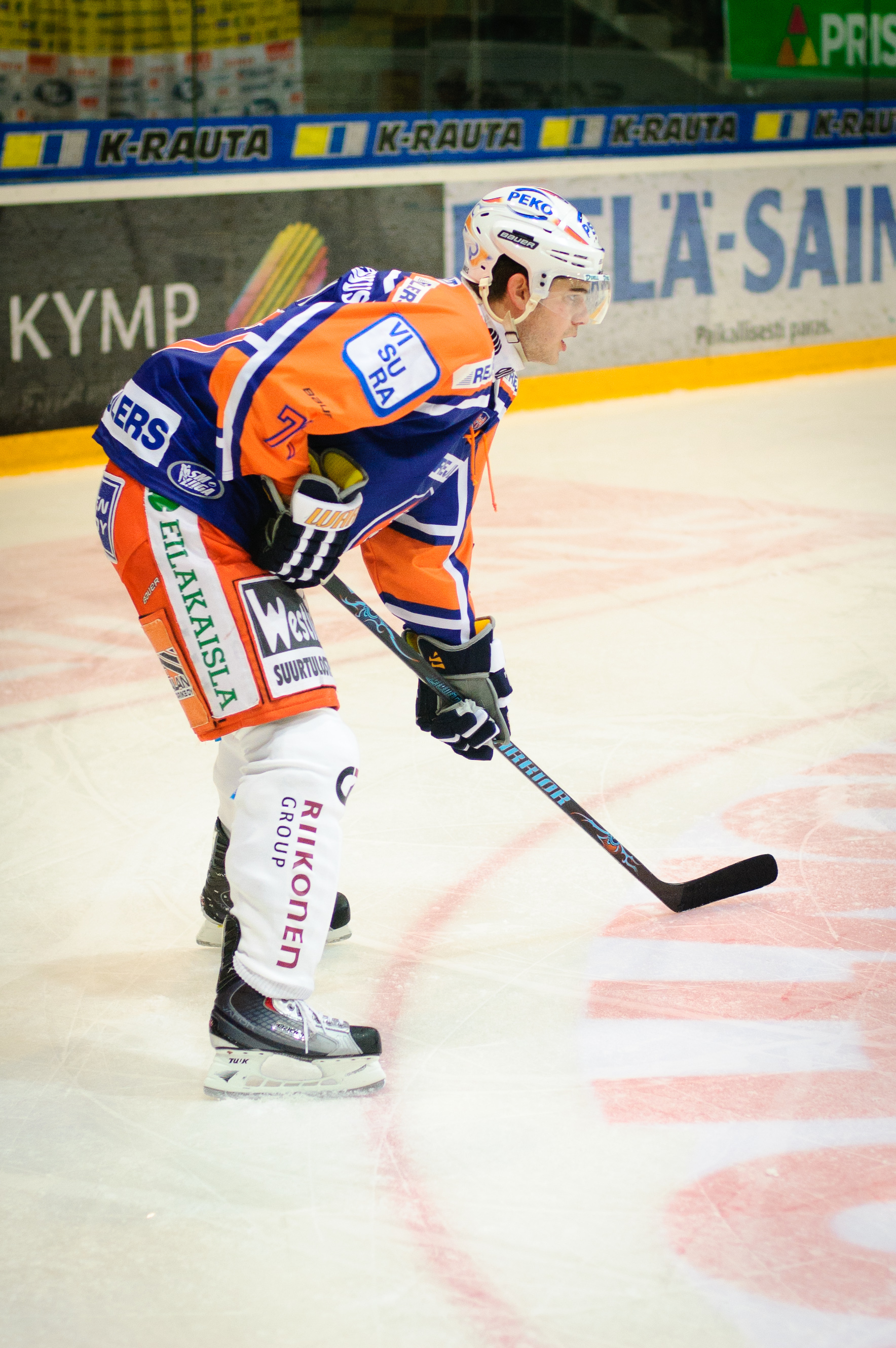
- Born: 3 November 1988 (age 37) Helsinki, Finland
- Height: 6 ft 2 in (188 cm)
- Weight: 194 lb (88 kg; 13 st 12 lb)
- Position: Defender
- Played for: Tappara; HPK; JYP Jyväskylä; Espoo Blues
- NHL draft: 170th overall, 2007; Minnesota Wild
- Playing career: 2007–2013

Harri Ilvonen (born 3 November 1988) is a Finnish former professional ice hockey defenseman who played in his country's top tier Liiga.

== Playing career ==
Ilvonen made his first appearances for Tappara during the 2006–07 season. After a promising rookie year, he was selected by the Minnesota Wild in the sixth-round, 170th overall, in the 2007 NHL entry draft. In the spring of 2008 he had a brief stint with HPK before returning to Tappara for the next season.

Ilvonen was never signed by the Wild and remained in Finland for the entirety of his professional career, finishing with the Espoo Blues in the 2012–13 season. Having ended his career playing in 204 Liiga games, Ilvonen later returned to Tappara in a coaching capacity, accepting an assistant coaching role with their under-18 youth team from the 2015–16 season.

== Career statistics ==
			Regular season					Playoffs
Season	Team	League	GP	G	A	Pts	PIM	GP	G	A	Pts	PIM
2004–05	Tappara	FIN U18	27	2	10	12	14	2	0	0	0	2
2005–06	Tappara	FIN U18	10	3	5	8	10	3	0	2	2	4
2005–06	Tappara	FIN U20	24	2	1	3	24	—	—	—	—	—
2006–07	Tappara	FIN U20	39	9	21	30	38	10	0	2	2	22
2006–07	Tappara	SM-l	7	0	0	0	2	—	—	—	—	—
2007–08	Tappara	FIN U20	14	2	10	12	22	—	—	—	—	—
2007–08	Tappara	SM-l	2	0	0	0	0	—	—	—	—	—
2007–08	Suomi U20	FIN.2	4	0	2	2	2	—	—	—	—	—
2007–08	LeKi	FIN.2	7	0	1	1	4	—	—	—	—	—
2007–08	HPK	SM-l	11	2	2	4	2	—	—	—	—	—
2008–09	Tappara	SM-l	23	0	1	1	6	—	—	—	—	—
2008–09	LeKi	FIN.2	21	4	3	7	8	—	—	—	—	—
2009–10	Tappara	SM-l	54	6	13	19	50	9	3	5	8	4
2010–11	Tappara	SM-l	31	1	5	6	18	—	—	—	—	—
2011–12	JYP	SM-l	13	1	1	2	16	—	—	—	—	—
2011–12	JYP–Akatemia	FIN.2	1	0	0	0	0	—	—	—	—	—
2011–12	Blues	SM-l	25	0	0	0	6	10	1	2	3	2
2012–13	Blues	SM-l	38	1	1	2	24	—	—	—	—	—
SM-liiga totals			204	11	23	34	124	19	4	7	11	6
