= 2010–11 St. Louis Blues season =

44th season of the NHL franchise

2010–11 St. Louis Blues
- Division: 4th Central
- Conference: 11th Western
- 2010–11 record: 38–33–11
- Home record: 23–13–5
- Road record: 15–20–6
- Goals for: 240
- Goals against: 234

Team information
- General manager: Doug Armstrong
- Coach: Davis Payne
- Captain: Eric Brewer (Oct.–Feb.); Vacant (Feb.–Apr.)
- Alternate captains: David Backes; Barret Jackman; Erik Johnson (Oct.–Feb.); Alexander Steen
- Arena: Scottrade Center
- Average attendance: 19,150

Team leaders
- Goals: David Backes (31)
- Assists: Alex Pietrangelo (32)
- Points: David Backes (62)
- Penalty minutes: B. J. Crombeen (154)
- Plus/minus: David Backes (+32)
- Wins: Jaroslav Halak (27)
- Goals against average: Jaroslav Halak (2.48)

The 2010–11 St. Louis Blues season was the team's 44th season for the National Hockey League (NHL) franchise that was established on June 5, 1967.

The Blues posted a regular season record of 38 wins, 33 losses and 11 overtime/shootout losses for 87 points, failing to qualify for the Stanley Cup playoffs for the second consecutive season for the first time since the 2006–07 season and the 2007–08 season. this was the final season that the Blues did not make the playoffs Until the 2017–18 season.

== Off-season ==
On April 14, the Blues announced that Davis Payne would be retained as head coach, making him the 23rd head coach of the franchise.
Doug Armstrong was named the new general manager, replacing Larry Pleau, who will serve in a different capacity in the organization. On June 1, former player Scott Mellanby was hired as an assistant coach. On June 18, the Blues hired former NHL goaltender Corey Hirsch as their new goaltending coach. He joined the Blues on July 1.

On July 1, Doug Armstrong became the team's new general manager. Also on July 1, Dave Taylor became the new director of player personnel. He was previously with the Dallas Stars for three years and prior to that with the Los Angeles Kings organization as both a player and in their front office for 30 years.

On August 12, Dr. Jerome Gilden, the Blues' team doctor since their inception in 1967, died.

On August 27, forward Paul Kariya (a free agent at the time) announced that he would sit out the entire 2010–11 season due to post-concussion syndrome.

=== Divisional standings ===
Central Division
		GP	W	L	OTL	ROW	GF	GA	Pts
**1**	**y-Detroit Red Wings**	**82**	**47**	**25**	**10**	**43**	**261**	**241**	**104**
**2**	**Nashville Predators**	**82**	**44**	**27**	**11**	**38**	**219**	**194**	**99**
**3**	**Chicago Blackhawks**	**82**	**44**	**29**	**9**	**38**	**258**	**225**	**97**
4	St. Louis Blues	82	38	33	11	34	240	234	87
5	Columbus Blue Jackets	82	34	35	13	29	215	258	81

=== Conference standings ===
Western Conference
R		Div	GP	W	L	OTL	ROW	GF	GA	Pts
**1**	**p – Vancouver Canucks**	**NW**	**82**	**54**	**19**	**9**	**50**	**262**	**185**	117
**2**	**y – San Jose Sharks**	**PA**	**82**	**48**	**25**	**9**	**43**	**248**	**213**	105
**3**	**y – Detroit Red Wings**	**CE**	**82**	**47**	**25**	**10**	**43**	**261**	**241**	104
**4**	**Anaheim Ducks**	**PA**	**82**	**47**	**30**	**5**	**43**	**239**	**235**	99
**5**	**Nashville Predators**	**CE**	**82**	**44**	**27**	**11**	**38**	**219**	**194**	99
**6**	**Phoenix Coyotes**	**PA**	**82**	**43**	**26**	**13**	**38**	**231**	**226**	99
**7**	**Los Angeles Kings**	**PA**	**82**	**46**	**30**	**6**	**36**	**219**	**198**	98
**8**	**Chicago Blackhawks**	**CE**	**82**	**44**	**29**	**9**	**38**	**258**	**225**	97
8.5
9	Dallas Stars	PA	82	42	29	11	37	227	233	95
10	Calgary Flames	NW	82	41	29	12	32	250	237	94
11	St. Louis Blues	CE	82	38	33	11	34	240	234	87
12	Minnesota Wild	NW	82	39	35	8	36	206	233	86
13	Columbus Blue Jackets	CE	82	34	35	13	29	215	258	81
14	Colorado Avalanche	NW	82	30	44	8	24	227	288	68
15	Edmonton Oilers	NW	82	25	45	12	23	193	269	62

bold – qualified for playoffs; y – Won division; p – Won President's Trophy (best record in NHL)
CE – Central Division, NW – Northwest Division, PA – Pacific Division

== Schedule and results ==
=== Pre-season ===
2010 Pre-season
#	Date	Visitor	Score	Home	OT	Decision	Attendance	Record	Recap
1	September 21	Colorado Avalanche	3-1	St. Louis Blues		Halak	10,615	0-1-0
2	September 22	St. Louis Blues	5-1	Minnesota Wild		Bishop	16,219	1-1-0
3	September 24	Minnesota Wild	0-5	St. Louis Blues		Conklin	11,525	2-1-0
4	September 25	St. Louis Blues	2-5	Dallas Stars		Allen	9,346	2-2-0
5	September 26	St. Louis Blues	2-0	Colorado Avalanche		Bishop		3-2-0
6	September 30	Chicago Blackhawks	1-4	St. Louis Blues		Halak	11,624	4-2-0
7	October 2	Dallas Stars	2-3	St. Louis Blues	OT	Halak	14,319	5-2-0
8	October 3	St. Louis Blues	3-4	Chicago Blackhawks		Conklin	19,692	5-3-0

== Schedule and results ==
Blues Schedule
On FSN, unless noted otherwise on VS.

- Green background indicates win (2 points).
- Red background indicates regulation loss (0 points).
- White background indicates overtime/shootout loss (1 point).

2010–11 Game Log

October: 6–1–2 (Home: 5–0–0; Road: 1–1–2)
#	Date	Visitor	Score	Home	OT	Decision	Attendance	Record	Pts	Recap
1	October 9	Philadelphia Flyers, 7pm	1 - 2	St. Louis Blues	OT	Halak	19,150	1-0-0	2	StL 2, Phi 1 OT
2	October 11	Anaheim Ducks, 1pm	1 - 5	St. Louis Blues		Halak	19,150	2-0-0	4	StL 5, Ana 1
3	October 14	St. Louis Blues, 7pm	3 - 4	Nashville Predators		Halak	15,103	2-1-0	4	Nsh 4, StL 3
4	October 16	St. Louis Blues, 7:30pm	2 - 3	Dallas Stars	SO	Conklin	11,750	2-1-1	5	Dal 3, StL 2 SO
5	October 18	St. Louis Blues, 7:30pm	2 - 3	Chicago Blackhawks	OT	Halak	20,641	2-1-2	6	Chi 3, StL 2 OT
6	October 22	Chicago Blackhawks, 7pm	2 - 4	St. Louis Blues		Halak	19,150	3-1-2	8	StL 4, Chi 2
7	October 23	Pittsburgh Penguins, 7pm	0 - 1	St. Louis Blues	OT	Halak	19,150	4-1-2	10	StL 1, Pit 0 OT
8	October 28	St. Louis Blues, 7pm	3 - 0	Nashville Predators		Halak	15,506	5-1-2	12	StL 3, Nsh 0
9	October 30	Atlanta Thrashers, 7pm	3 - 4	St. Louis Blues	SO	Halak	19,150	6-1-2	14	StL 4, Atl 3 SO

- Green background indicates win (2 points).
- Red background indicates regulation loss (0 points).
- White background indicates overtime/shootout loss (1 point).

November: 6–7–1 (Home: 3–1–1; Road: 3-6–0)
#	Date	Visitor	Score	Home	OT	Decision	Attendance	Record	Pts	Recap
10	November 4	San Jose Sharks, 7pm	0 - 2	St. Louis Blues		Halak	19,150	7-1-2	16	StL 2, SJ 0
11	November 6	St. Louis Blues, 6pm	2 - 1	Boston Bruins	SO	Halak	17,565	8-1-2	18	StL 2, Bos 1 SO
12	November 7	St. Louis Blues, 6pm	2 - 0	New York Rangers		Conklin	17,376	9-1-2	20	StL 2, NYR 0
13	November 10	St. Louis Blues, 6pm	1 - 8	Columbus Blue Jackets		Halak	10,265	9-2-2	20	CBJ 8, StL 1
14	November 11	Nashville Predators, 7pm	3 - 2	St. Louis Blues	SO	Halak	19,150	9-2-3	21	Nsh 3, StL 2 SO
15	November 13	St. Louis Blues, 7pm	3 - 5	Phoenix Coyotes		Conklin	9,412	9-3-3	21	Pho 5, StL 3
16	November 15	St. Louis Blues, 7pm [VS]	3 - 6	Colorado Avalanche		Halak	12,670	9-4-3	21	CO 6, StL 3
17	November 17	St. Louis Blues, 6:30pm	3 - 7	Detroit Red Wings		Halak	20,066	9-5-3	21	Det 7, StL 3
18	November 19	Ottawa Senators, 7pm	2 - 5	St. Louis Blues		Conklin	19,150	10-5-3	23	StL 5, Ott 2
19	November 20	New Jersey Devils, 7pm	2 - 3	St. Louis Blues		Halak	19,150	11-5-3	25	StL 3, NJ 2
20	November 24	St. Louis Blues, 7pm [VS]	2 - 1	Nashville Predators	SO	Halak	16,603	12-5-3	27	StL 2, Nsh 1 SO
21	November 26	St. Louis Blues, 7:30pm	2 - 3	Dallas Stars		Halak	16,675	12-6-3	27	Dal 3, StL 2
22	November 27	Dallas Stars, 7pm	2 - 1	St. Louis Blues		Halak	19,150	12-7-3	27	Dal 2, StL 1
23	November 30	St. Louis Blues, 7pm [VS]	5 - 7	Chicago Blackhawks		Conklin	21,140	12-8-3	27	Chi 7, StL 5

- Green background indicates win (2 points).
- Red background indicates regulation loss (0 points).
- White background indicates overtime/shootout loss (1 point).

December: 8–4–2 (Home: 6–3–1; Road: 2–1–1)
#	Date	Visitor	Score	Home	OT	Decision	Attendance	Record	Pts	Recap
24	December 1	Washington Capitals, 7pm	4 - 1	St. Louis Blues		Halak	19,150	12-9-3	27	Wsh 4, StL 1
25	December 4	St. Louis Blues, 9pm	1 - 2	Edmonton Oilers	OT	Halak	16,839	12-9-4	28	Edm 2, StL 1 OT
26	December 5	St. Louis Blues, 8pm	3 - 2	Vancouver Canucks		Halal	18,860	13-9-4	30	StL 3, Van 2
27	December 9	Columbus Blue Jackets, 7pm	1 - 4	St. Louis Blues		Halak	19,150	14-9-4	32	StL 4, Col 1
28	December 11	Carolina Hurricanes, 7pm	2 - 1	St. Louis Blues	SO	Halak	19,150	14-9-5	33	Car 2, StL 1 SO
29	December 15	St. Louis Blues, 6:30pm	2 - 5	Detroit Red Wings		Halak	18,769	14-10-5	33	Det 5, StL 2
30	December 16	Los Angeles Kings, 7pm	4 - 6	St. Louis Blues		Conklin	19,150	15-10-5	35	StL 6, L.A. 4
31	December 18	San Jose Sharks, 7pm	4 - 1	St. Louis Blues		Halak	19,150	15-11-5	35	SJ 4, StL 1
32	December 20	Vancouver Canucks, 7pm	3 - 1	St. Louis Blues		Halak	19,150	15-12-5	35	Van 3, StL 1
33	December 21	St. Louis Blues, 6pm [no TV]	4 - 2	Atlanta Thrashers		Conklin	14,662	16-12-5	37	StL 4, Atl 2
34	December 23	Detroit Red Wings, 7pm	3 - 4	St. Louis Blues		Halak	19,150	17-12-5	39	StL 4, Det 3
35	December 26	Nashville Predators, 6pm	0 - 2	St. Louis Blues		Halak	19,150	18-12-5	41	StL 2, Nsh 0
36	December 28	Chicago Blackhawks, 7pm	1 - 3	St. Louis Blues		Conklin	19,150	19-12-5	43	StL 3, Chi 1
37	December 31	Phoenix Coyotes, 7:30pm [VS]	3 - 4	St. Louis Blues		Halak	19,150	20-12-5	45	StL 4, Pho 3

- Green background indicates win (2 points).
- Red background indicates regulation loss (0 points).
- White background indicates overtime/shootout loss (1 point).

January: 2-8–2 (Home: 1–4–1; Road: 1–4–1)
#	Date	Visitor	Score	Home	OT	Decision	Attendance	Record	Pts	Recap
38	January 2	Dallas Stars, 5pm	4 - 2	St. Louis Blues		Halak	19,150	20-13-5	45	Dal 4, StL 2
39	January 6	St. Louis Blues, 6pm	5 - 6	Toronto Maple Leafs	SO	Conklin	19,283	20-13-6	46	Tor 6, StL 5 SO
40	January 8	New York Rangers, 7pm	2 - 1	St. Louis Blues		Halak	19,150	20-14-6	46	NYR 2, StL 1
41	January 10	Phoenix Coyotes, 8pm	4 - 3	St. Louis Blues		Halak	19,150	20-15-6	46	Pho 4, StL 3
42	January 12	St. Louis Blues, 9pm	4 - 7	Anaheim Ducks		Conklin	12,499	20-16-6	46	Ana 7, StL 4
43	January 13	St. Louis Blues, 9:30pm	3 - 1	Los Angeles Kings		Halak	17,932	21-16-6	48	StL 3, L.A. 1
44	January 15	St. Louis Blues, 9:30pm	2 - 4	San Jose Sharks		Halak	17,562	21-17-6	48	SJ 4, StL 2
45	January 18	Los Angeles Kings, 7pm	1 - 2	St. Louis Blues		Halak	19,150	22-17-6	50	StL 2, L.A. 1
46	January 20	Detroit Red Wings, 7pm	4 - 3	St. Louis Blues	OT	Halak	19,150	22-17-7	51	Det 4, StL 3 OT
47	January 22	Columbus Blue Jackets, 7pm	5 - 2	St. Louis Blues		Halak	19,150	22-18-7	51	CBJ 5, StL 2
48	January 24	St. Louis Blues, 8:30pm	3 - 4	Colorado Avalanche		Halak	12,338	22-19-7	51	Col 4, StL 3
49	January 26	St. Louis Blues, 9pm	1 - 4	Calgary Flames		Conklin	19,289	22-20-7	51	Cal 4, StL 1

- Green background indicates win (2 points).
- Red background indicates regulation loss (0 points).
- White background indicates overtime/shootout loss (1 point).

February: 6–5–2 (Home: 3–2–1; Road: 3–3–1)
#	Date	Visitor	Score	Home	OT	Decision	Attendance	Record	Pts	Recap
--	February 1	Colorado Avalanche, 7pm		St. Louis Blues	PPD. INCLEMENT WEATHER (Tu. Feb. 22 make-up date)
50	February 4	Edmonton Oilers, 7pm	3 - 5	St. Louis Blues		Conklin	19,150	23-20-7	53	StL 5, Edm 3
51	February 6	St. Louis Blues, 2pm	3 - 4	Tampa Bay Lightning	OT	Conklin	14,896	23-20-8	54	TB 4, StL 3 OT
52	February 8	St. Louis Blues, 6:30pm	2 - 1	Florida Panthers		Halak	12,228	24-20-8	56	StL 2, FL 1
53	February 11	Minnesota Wild, 7pm	5 - 4	St. Louis Blues	SO	Halak	19,150	24-20-9	57	Min. 5, StL 4
54	February 12	St. Louis Blues, 8pm	1 - 3	Minnesota Wild		Halak	19,322	24-21-9	57	Min. 3, StL 1
55	February 14	Vancouver Canucks, 7pm (no TV)	2 - 3	St. Louis Blues		Halak	19,150	25-21-9	59	StL 3, Van 2
56	February 18	St. Louis Blues, 6:30pm	3 - 0	Buffalo Sabres		Conklin	18,493	26-21-9	61	StL 3, Buf 0
57	February 19	Anaheim Ducks, 7pm	3 - 9	St. Louis Blues		Bishop	19,150	27-21-9	63	StL 9, Ana 3
58	February 21	Chicago Blackhawks, 1pm	5 - 3	St. Louis Blues		Bishop	19,150	27-22-9	63	Chi 4, StL 3
59	February 22	Colorado Avalanche, 7pm	4 - 3	St. Louis Blues		Conklin	19,150	27-23-9	63	CO 4, StL 3 (2/1 make-up game)
60	February 24	St. Louis Blues, 9pm	2 - 3	Vancouver Canucks		Conklin	18,860	27-24-9	63	Van 3, StL 2
61	February 25	St. Louis Blues, 8pm	5 - 0	Edmonton Oilers		Bishop	16,839	28-24-9	65	StL 5, Edm 0
62	February 27	St. Louis Blues, 7pm	0 - 1	Calgary Flames		Bishop	19,289	28-25-9	65	Cal 1, StL 0

- Green background indicates win (2 points).
- Red background indicates regulation loss (0 points).
- White background indicates overtime/shootout loss (1 point).

March: 7–7–1 (Home: 3–2–1; Road: 4–5–0)
#	Date	Visitor	Score	Home	OT	Decision	Attendance	Record	Pts	Recap
63	March 1	Calgary Flames, 7pm	6 - 0	St. Louis Blues		Bishop	19,150	28-26-9	65	Cal 6, StL 0
64	March 3	St. Louis Blues, 6pm	2 - 3	Washington Capitals		Conklin	18,398	28-27-9	65	Wsh 3, StL 2
65	March 5	St. Louis Blues, 12pm (alternate FSM channel)	2 - 5	New York Islanders		Bishop	10,354	28-28-9	65	NYI 5, StL 2
66	March 7	Columbus Blue Jackets, 8pm	4 - 5	St. Louis Blues	SO	Bishop	19,150	29-28-9	67	StL 5, Col 4 SO
67	March 9	St. Louis Blues, 6pm	4 - 3	Columbus Blue Jackets	OT	Halak	11,508	30-28-9	69	StL 4, Col 3 OT
68	March 10	Montreal Canadiens, 7pm	1 - 4	St. Louis Blues		Halak	19,150	31-28-9	71	StL 4, Mon 1
69	March 12	Detroit Red Wings, 7pm	5 - 3	St. Louis Blues		Halak	19,150	31-29-9	71	Det 5, StL 3
70	March 16	St. Louis Blues, 9pm	1 - 2	Anaheim Ducks		Halak	12,604	31-30-9	71	Ana 2, StL 1
71	March 17	St. Louis Blues, 9:30pm	4 - 0	Los Angeles Kings		Halak	18,118	32-30-9	73	StL 4, L.A. 0
72	March 19	St. Louis Blues, 9:30pm	3 - 5	San Jose Sharks		Conklin	17,562	32-31-9	73	SJ 5, StL 3
73	March 22	St. Louis Blues, 9pm	1 - 2	Phoenix Coyotes		Halak	10,977	32-32-9	73	Pho 2, StL 1
74	March 24	Edmonton Oilers, 7pm	0 - 4	St. Louis Blues		Halak	19,150	33-32-9	75	StL 4, Edm 0
75	March 26	St. Louis Blues, 7pm	6 - 3	Minnesota Wild		Conklin	18,112	34-32-9	77	StL 6, Min 3
76	March 29	Minnesota Wild, 7pm	3 - 2	St. Louis Blues	SO	Halak	19,150	34-32-10	78	Min 3, StL 2 SO
77	March 30	St. Louis Blues, 6:30pm	10 - 3	Detroit Red Wings		Halak	20,066	35-32-10	80	StL 10, Det 3

- Green background indicates win (2 points).
- Red background indicates regulation loss (0 points).
- White background indicates overtime/shootout loss (1 point).

April: 3–1–1 (Home: 2–1–0; Road: 1–0–1)
#	Date	Visitor	Score	Home	OT	Decision	Attendance	Record	Pts	Recap
78	April 1	Calgary Flames, 7pm	3 - 2	St. Louis Blues		Halak	19,150	35-33-10	80	Cal 3, StL 2
79	April 3	St. Louis Blues, 4pm	6 - 1	Columbus Blue Jackets		Halak	13,538	36-33-10	82	StL 6, Col 1
80	April 5	Colorado Avalanche, 7pm	1 - 3	St. Louis Blues		Halak	19,150	37-33-10	84	StL 3, CO 1
81	April 6	St. Louis Blues, 7pm [VS]	3 - 4	Chicago Blackhawks	OT	Conklin	21,435	37-33-11	85	Chi 4, StL 3 OT
82	April 9	Nashville Predators, 7pm	0 - 2	St. Louis Blues		Halak	19,150	38-33-11	87	StL 2, Nsh 0

== Season ==
=== November ===
T. J. Oshie broke his ankle in Columbus on November 10 during a fight midway in the third period playing the Columbus Blue Jackets when a Blue Jacket player fell on him; he will be out at least three months. He had surgery the next day. Just before that game, after a November 7 shutout (game #4) win, the Blues were off to their best start in team history, with seven consecutive wins for 20 points (9–1–2) in only 12 games.

Ratings have soared for the Blues on FSN with 16 telecasts averaging 3.6, a whopping 59% higher than the 2.3 rating compared to the same time last year. October was the best-season opening month in Blues' history for games on the network. A record 5.6 rating was achieved on November 4 (Blues at home against the San Jose Sharks) beating the 5.0 rating for a game on March 29, 2000. The team has also sold out each one of its nine home games so far with 19,150 per game, for a total of 172,350.

=== December ===
The slew of key injuries this season continued with the concussion that Andy McDonald received on the last play of the December 4 game against the Edmonton Oilers in an overtime loss. He is the fourth Blue to suffer the debilitating injury with Cam Janssen and Carlo Colaiacovo returning, but David Perron still out with his since November 4.

T. J. Oshie began a light skate on December 23, six weeks after suffering a broken ankle on November 10, and could return by the end of January.

=== January ===
David Backes was named the lone Blues' representative for the NHL All-Star Game for January 30, his first.

T. J. Oshie was activated and available for the game on January 18 after missing 31 games since a broken ankle on November 10.

On January 20, the Blues updated the status of two forwards with concussions: Andy McDonald and David Perron. McDonald passed a baseline concussion test and has resumed light skating. He has been out of the lineup since December 4. Perron is still experiencing symptoms but will begin light exercise to see how his body responds. He has been out of the lineup since November 4.

=== February ===
On February 1, the Blues announced that the day's home game against the Colorado Avalanche was postponed due to severe weather. No make-up date has been set.

On February 2, the Blues announced that February 22 at 7pm is to be the make-up date for the February 1 postponed game.

Andy McDonald has been activated from injured reserve and will play against the Edmonton Oilers on February 4. He has missed 24 games since his December 4 concussion. To make room for him, the Blues sent Philip McRae down to the American Hockey League's Peoria Rivermen.

On February 18, the Blues traded their captain, Eric Brewer to the Tampa Bay Lightning in exchange for unsigned draft choice Brock Beukeboom and a third-round pick in the upcoming 2011 NHL entry draft.

On a second consecutive day of trading, the Blues traded Erik Johnson, Jay McClement and a 2011 or 2012 first-round draft choice to the Colorado Avalanche in exchange for former first-round draft choices Chris Stewart, Kevin Shattenkirk and a conditional 2011 or 2012 second-round draft choice.

The team responded to the changes in the next game that same February 19 evening. After spotting the Anaheim Ducks an 0–2 deficit, they scored two quick goals to tie the game, and then two others in the first period for a slender 4–3 lead. They then blasted four more goals in the second period, including two consecutive goals late in the period by newcomer Chris Stewart (with Kevin Shattenkirk setting him up for his second goal), and one more in the third in a runaway 9–3 win. It was the highest number of goals scored by the Blues in a single game since they scored their all-time high of 11 against the Ottawa Senators in 1994.

David Perron has been trying to get back onto the ice since his November 4 concussion. He has missed 50 games (through game #60 on February 24). He passed a baseline test last month and has begun light exercises.

Ben Bishop recorded his first NHL shutout against the Edmonton Oilers, stopping all 39 shots in a 5–0 win in Edmonton on February 25.

In the third major trade in barely over a week, on February 27, the Blues traded Brad Boyes to the Buffalo Sabres for a second-round draft pick.

The Blues suffered a rare shutout at the Buffalo game after 111 consecutive games, the longest in the NHL and only eight games shy of the Blues' record.

The Blues on February 28, the Blues placed goaltender Ty Conklin on waivers, but he cleared them with no team picking him up, so he remains a Blue for now. The team can either send him to the Peoria Rivermen, or ask goaltender Ben Bishop to be demoted.

In a move just before the NHL trade deadline at 3pm EST, on February 28, the Blues traded left-winger Brad Winchester for a third-round draft pick from the Anaheim Ducks in 2012.

=== March ===
After a glittering 9–1–2 (20 points in 12 games) start, the Blues plagued by injuries and sub-par performances by key personnel, dropped to an even record (28–28–9) with a loss to the New York Islanders on March 5. They have since struggled to a 19–27–7 (45 points in 53 games) record after that November 7 high point.

Prior to the March 7 game, a 5–4 shootout win against the Columbus Blue Jackets, the team honored its four greatest players to wear the number 7 jersey in a "Salute to No. 7": Red Berenson, Garry Unger, Joe Mullen, and Keith Tkachuk. Transcripts of the four speeches are here.

Defenseman Barret Jackman and forward Alexander Steen (both alternate captains), will miss four-to-six weeks due to injuries suffered in the overtime win on March 9. The team subsequently elevated 21-year-old, up-and-coming defenseman Alex Pietrangelo and veteran Andy McDonald to alternate captains.

On March 16, Chairman Dave Checketts announced he was putting up for sale his 20% stake in the franchise and the Scottrade Center. TowerBrook Capital Partners owns 70% and other minority investors (including a local beer distributor Tom Stillman) own the other 10%. On March 17, it was announced that both the St. Louis Blues franchise and the Scottrade Center were for sale.

On March 30, the Blues defeated the Detroit Red Wings 10–3 at Joe Louis Arena. It was the first time an NHL team had scored 10 goals in a regular season game since February 6, 2009, when the Dallas Stars defeated the New York Rangers at home by a score of 10–2. It was also the first time that the Blues had scored 10 goals in a regular-season game since February 26, 1994, when they defeated the Ottawa Senators in an 11–1 road win.

=== April ===
On April 1, the Blues were officially eliminated from the playoffs with a 3–2 loss to the Calgary Flames with a record of 35–33–10 (80 points) and four games to play. Calgary now has 89 points while the Blues can now only get to 88 points. Jarome Iginla got two goals plus an assist in the win to become the 77th player to reach 1,000 points in his career with the game-winning wrist shot on a breakaway with only 5:03 remaining in the third period. He has 39 goals and 41 assists in 79 games this season, and 480 goals plus 520 assists in 1,103 career regular-season games.

On April 9, David Backes earned a plus-minus team-high of +32, Alexander Steen scored his 20th goal with 49 seconds remaining in the game – which was also his 100th career NHL goal – and T. J. Oshie scored the first goal in a 2–0 shutout by Jaroslav Halak for the third time this season over the Nashville Predators.

The Blues finished in fourth place in the Central Division and 11th place in the Western Conference with a 38–33–11 (87 points) record.

The Blues concluded the regular season having allowed the fewest shorthanded goals in the NHL, with just one.

== Playoffs ==
The Blues failed to qualify for the playoffs again after having failed to qualify in 2009–10.

== Player statistics ==
=== Skaters ===
(Updated through games of April 9, 2011) FINAL
Stats

Note: GP = Games played; G = Goals; A = Assists; Pts = Points; +/− = Plus/minus; PIM = Penalty minutes

Regular season

Player	GP	G	A	Pts	+/−	PIM
David Backes	**82**	**31**	31	**62**	**32**	93
Patrik Berglund	81	22	30	52	-3	26
Alexander Steen	72	20	31	51	-3	26
Andy McDonald	58	20	30	50	18	26
Matt D'Agostini	**82**	21	25	46	8	40
Alex Pietrangelo	79	11	**32**	43	18	19
Brad Boyes (-2/27) ‡	62	12	29	41	11	30
T. J. Oshie	49	12	22	34	10	15
Vladimir Sobotka	65	7	22	29	-4	69
Carlo Colaiacovo	65	6	20	26	-4	23
Chris Stewart (2/19- ) †	26	15	8	23	4	15
Erik Johnson (-2/18) ‡	55	5	14	19	-8	37
Kevin Shattenkirk (2/19- ) †	26	2	15	17	7	16
Jay McClement (-2/18) ‡	56	6	10	16	-13	18
B. J. Crombeen	80	7	7	14	-18	**154**
Eric Brewer ( -2/14) ‡	54	8	6	14	1	57
Brad Winchester (-2/27) ‡	57	9	5	14	-9	86
Barret Jackman	60	0	13	13	3	57
Roman Polak	55	3	9	12	-4	33
Nikita Nikitin	41	1	8	9	1	10
David Perron	10	5	2	7	7	12
Chris Porter	45	3	4	7	-4	16
Adam Cracknell	24	3	4	7	1	8
Cam Janssen	54	1	3	4	-6	131
Ryan Reaves	28	2	2	4	-1	78
Ian Cole	26	1	3	4	6	35
Nathan Oystrick	9	1	2	3	1	9
T. J. Hensick	13	1	2	3	-5	2
Philip McRae	15	1	2	3	-10	2
Dave Scatchard	8	0	1	1	1	6
Tyson Strachan	29	0	1	1	-10	39
Nicholas Drazenovic	3	0	0	0	-3	0
Stefan Della Rovere	7	0	0	0	0	11

* indicates not currently on the active roster.
^{+} indicates on Injured Reserve.
^{‡}Traded away mid-season, date of last game in ( ). Stats reflect time with Blues only.
^{†}Denotes player spent time with another team before joining Blues, date of first game in ( ). Stats reflect time with Blues only. Bold = leading team in category.

=== Goaltenders ===
(Updated through games of April 9, 2011, FINAL)
Stats

Note: GP = Games played; TOI = Time on ice (minutes); W = Wins; L = Losses; OT = Overtime losses; GA = Goals against; GAA= Goals against average; SA= Shots against; SV= Saves; Sv% = Save percentage; SO= Shutouts

Regular season

Player	GP	Min	W	L	OT	GA	GAA	SA	Sv%	SO	G	A	PIM
Jaroslav Halak	57	3,294	27	21	7	136	2.48	1,518	.910	7	0	0	6
Ty Conklin	25	1,285	8	8	4	69	3.22	582	.881	2	0	0	4
Ben Bishop	7	369	3	4	0	17	2.76	168	.899	1	0	0	0
**TOTALS**	**82**	**4,948**	**38**	**33**	**11**	**222**	**2.69**	**2,268**	**.902**	**10**	**0**	**0**	**10**

== Awards and records ==
=== Awards ===
Regular Season
Player	Award	Awarded
Jaroslav Halak	NHL Second Star of the Week	October 25, 2010
Jaroslav Halak	NHL Third Star of the Week	November 8, 2010

=== Milestones ===
Regular Season
Player	Milestone	Reached
Ryan Reaves	1st Career NHL Game	October 11, 2010
Alexander Steen	200th Career NHL Point	October 14, 2010
Andy McDonald	400th Career NHL Point	October 22, 2010
Jay McClement	400th Career NHL Game	October 23, 2010
Ian Cole	1st Career NHL Game	November 6, 2010
Nikita Nikitin	1st Career NHL Game	November 6, 2010
Nicholas Drazenovic	1st Career NHL Game	November 11, 2010
Brad Boyes	300th Career NHL Point	November 13, 2010
Carlo Colaiacovo	100th Career NHL Point	November 15, 2010
T. J. Hensick	100th Career NHL Game	November 17, 2010
David Backes	300th Career NHL Game	November 19, 2010
Eric Brewer	700th Career NHL Game	November 19, 2010
Alexander Steen	400th Career NHL Game	November 19, 2010
Stefan Della Rovere	1st Career NHL Game	December 1, 2010
David Backes	100th Career NHL Assist	December 9, 2010
Eric Brewer	200th Career NHL Point	December 15, 2010
Adam Cracknell	1st Career NHL Game	December 15, 2010
Adam Cracknell	1st Career NHL Assist; 1st Career NHL Point	December 20, 2010
B. J. Crombeen	200th Career NHL Game	December 20, 2010
Barret Jackman	100th Career NHL Assist	December 28, 2010
Jay McClement	100th Career NHL Assist	January 10, 2011
Philip McRae	1st Career NHL Game	January 12, 2011
Ryan Reaves	1st Career NHL Goal; 1st Career NHL Point	January 12, 2011
Philip McRae	1st Career NHL Assist; 1st Career NHL Point	January 13, 2011
Patrik Berglund	100th Career NHL Point	January 22, 2011
Philip McRae	1st Career NHL Goal	January 26, 2011
Nikita Nikitin	1st Career NHL Assist; 1st Career NHL Point	February 4, 2011
Nikita Nikitin	1st Career NHL Goal	February 6, 2011
T. J. Oshie	100th Career NHL Point	February 6, 2011
Roman Polak	200th Career NHL Game	February 8, 2011
Patrik Berglund	200th Career NHL Game	February 11, 2011
Erik Johnson	200th Career NHL Game	February 11, 2011
Barret Jackman	500th Career NHL Game	February 14, 2011
David Backes	200th Career NHL Point	February 19, 2011
Brad Winchester	300th Career NHL Game	February 21, 2011
Andy McDonald	600th Career NHL Game	February 22, 2011
Ben Bishop	1st Career NHL Shutout	February 25, 2011
Ian Cole	1st Career NHL Goal; 1st Career NHL Assist; 1st Career NHL Point	March 9, 2011
Adam Cracknell	1st Career NHL Goal	March 12, 2011
Ryan Reaves	1st Career NHL Assist	March 12, 2011
Carlo Colaiacovo	300th Career NHL Game	March 29, 2011
David Backes	100th Career NHL Goal	April 1, 2011
Ty Conklin	200th Career NHL Game	April 6, 2011
Alexander Steen	100th Career NHL Goal	April 9, 2011

== Transactions ==
The Blues have been involved in the following transactions during the 2010–11 season.

=== Trades ===
Date	Details
June 17, 2010	To Montreal Canadiens Lars Eller; Ian Schultz	To St. Louis Blues Jaroslav Halak
June 17, 2010	To Colorado Avalanche Julian Talbot	To St. Louis Blues T. J. Hensick
June 25, 2010	To Ottawa Senators David Rundblad	To St. Louis Blues 1st-round pick in 2010 – Vladimir Tarasenko
June 26, 2010	To Boston Bruins David Warsofsky	To St. Louis Blues Vladimir Sobotka
July 28, 2010	To Washington Capitals D. J. King	To St. Louis Blues Stefan Della Rovere
August 3, 2010	To Florida Panthers T. J. Fast	To St. Louis Blues Graham Mink
February 18, 2011	To Tampa Bay Lightning Eric Brewer	To St. Louis Blues Brock Beukeboom; 3rd-round pick in 2011 – Jordan Binnington
February 19, 2011	To Colorado Avalanche Erik Johnson; Jay McClement; Conditional 1st-round pick in 2011 or 2012 (Note: Conditional pick became a pick in 2011.) – Duncan Siemens	To St. Louis Blues Chris Stewart; Kevin Shattenkirk; Conditional 2nd-round pick in 2011 or 2012 (Note: Conditional pick became a pick in 2011.) – Ty Rattie
February 27, 2011	To Buffalo Sabres Brad Boyes	To St. Louis Blues 2nd-round pick in 2011 – Joel Edmundson
February 28, 2011	To Anaheim Ducks Brad Winchester	To St. Louis Blues 3rd-round pick in 2012 – Mackenzie MacEachern

=== Free agents acquired ===
Player	Former team	Contract terms
Brennan Evans	Toronto Marlies	2 years, $1.025 million
Nathan Oystrick	Anaheim Ducks	1 year, $600,000
Dave Scatchard	Nashville Predators	1 year, $550,000
Dean Arsene	Edmonton Oilers	1 year, $600,000
Marek Svatos	Avangard Omsk	1 year, $800,000
Kyle Wellwood	Mytishchi Atlant	1 year, $650,000

=== Free agents lost ===
Player	New team	Contract terms
Jonas Junland	Farjestad BK	1 year
Chris Mason	Atlanta Thrashers	2 years, $3.7 million
Nate Guenin	Columbus Blue Jackets	1 year, $575,000
Mike Weaver	Florida Panthers	2 years, $1.8 million

=== Claimed via waivers ===
Player	Former team	Date claimed off waivers

=== Lost via waivers ===
Player	New team	Date claimed off waivers
Marek Svatos	Nashville Predators	December 29, 2010
Kyle Wellwood	San Jose Sharks	January 18, 2011

=== Lost via retirement ===
Player
Keith Tkachuk
Darryl Sydor

=== Players signings ===
Player	Contract terms
Tyler Shattock	3 years, $1.845 million entry-level contract
Anthony Nigro	3 years, $1.75 million entry-level contract
Adam Cracknell	1 year, $500,000
Jori Lehtera	2 years, $1.4625 million entry-level contract
David Rundblad	3 years, $2.7 million entry-level contract
Nikita Nikitin	1 year, $800,000 entry-level contract
Matt D'Agostini	1 year, $550,000
Vladimir Sobotka	1 year, $750,000
Alexander Steen	4 years, $13.45 million
Brad Winchester	1 year, $700,000
Jaroslav Halak	4 years, $15 million
Cam Janssen	1 year, $600,000
Carlo Colaiacovo	2 years, $4.25 million
Nicholas Drazenovic	1 year, $500,000
Tyson Strachan	1 year, $600,000
T. J. Hensick	1 year, $600,000
Ryan Reaves	1 year, $500,000
David Perron	2 years, $4.3 million
Erik Johnson	2 years, $5.2 million
David Spina	1 year, $500,000
David Backes	5 years, $22.5 million contract extension
Cade Fairchild	2 years, $1.25 million entry-level contract
David Shields	3 years, $1.75 million entry-level contract
Jay Barriball	1 year, $565,000 entry-level contract
Patrik Berglund	2 years, $4.5 million contract extension

== Draft picks ==
St. Louis's picks at the 2010 NHL entry draft in Los Angeles, June 25–26, 2010. The Blues had the 14th choice by virtue of finishing ninth in the conference in 2009–10.

Round	Pick	Player	Position	Nationality	Team (League)
1	14	Jaden Schwartz	C	Canada	Tri-City Storm (USHL)
1	16 (from Ottawa)	Vladimir Tarasenko	C	Russia	Sibir Novosibirsk (KHL)
2	44	Sebastian Wannstrom	C	Sweden	Brynäs IF (J20 SuperElit)
3	74	Max Gardiner	C	United States	Minnetonka High School (USHS-MN)
4	104	Jani Hakanpaa	D	Finland	Kiekko-Vantaa Jr. (Finland Jr-2)
5	134	Cody Beach	RW	Canada	Calgary Hitmen (WHL)
6	164	Stephen MacAulay	LW	Canada	Saint John Sea Dogs (QMJHL)

== Farm teams ==
=== Peoria Rivermen ===
The Peoria Rivermen are the Blues American Hockey League affiliate in 2010–11.

=== Alaska Aces ===
The Alaska Aces are the Blues affiliate in the ECHL.

== See also ==
- 2010–11 NHL season
- St. Louis Blues seasons
- St. Louis (sports)
