= 2007–08 St. Louis Blues season =

National Hockey League team season

2007–08 St. Louis Blues
- Division: 5th Central
- Conference: 14th Western
- 2007–08 record: 33–36–13
- Home record: 20–15–6
- Road record: 13–21–7
- Goals for: 205
- Goals against: 237

Team information
- General manager: Larry Pleau
- Coach: Andy Murray
- Captain: Vacant (Oct.–Feb.); Eric Brewer (Feb.–Apr.)
- Alternate captains: Barret Jackman; Paul Kariya; Jamal Mayers (Oct.–Jan.); Bryce Salvador (Oct.–Jan.); Keith Tkachuk; Doug Weight (Oct.–Dec.)
- Arena: Scottrade Center
- Average attendance: 17,610 (92.0%) [41 games]

Team leaders
- Goals: Brad Boyes (43)
- Assists: Paul Kariya (49)
- Points: Brad Boyes, Paul Kariya (65)
- Penalty minutes: D. J. King (100)
- Plus/minus: David Perron (+16)
- Wins: Manny Legace (27)
- Goals against average: Manny Legace (2.41)

The 2007–08 St. Louis Blues season began on October 4, 2007, with a game in Glendale, Arizona, against the Phoenix Coyotes. It is the Blues' 41st season in the National Hockey League (NHL).

Key dates prior to the start of the season:

- The 2007 NHL entry draft took place in Columbus, Ohio, on June 22–23.
- The free agency period began on July 1.

For the third year in a row, the Blues failed to qualify for the playoffs.

== Regular season ==
The Blues struggled on the power-play, finishing 31st in power-play goals scored (47) and 30th overall in power-play percentage (14.07%).

The Blues failed to qualify for the playoffs for the third season in a row and dropped from 81 points (34–35–13) in 2006–07, but they did manage to dramatically increase their average attendance from 12,520 (59.6% of capacity) that year, to 17,610 (92.0% of capacity) in 2007–08.

=== Divisional standings ===
Central Division
		GP	W	L	OTL	GF	GA	Pts
**1**	**p – Detroit Red Wings**	**82**	**54**	**21**	**7**	**257**	**184**	**115**
**2**	**Nashville Predators**	**82**	**41**	**32**	**9**	**230**	**229**	**91**
3	Chicago Blackhawks	82	40	34	8	239	235	88
4	Columbus Blue Jackets	82	34	36	12	193	218	80
5	St. Louis Blues	82	33	36	13	205	237	79

=== Conference standings ===
Western Conference
R		Div	GP	W	L	OTL	GF	GA	Pts
**1**	**p – Detroit Red Wings**	**CE**	**82**	**54**	**21**	**7**	**257**	**184**	115
**2**	**y – San Jose Sharks**	**PA**	**82**	**49**	**23**	**10**	**222**	**193**	108
**3**	**y – Minnesota Wild**	**NW**	**82**	**44**	**28**	**10**	**223**	**218**	98
**4**	**Anaheim Ducks**	**PA**	**82**	**47**	**27**	**8**	**205**	**191**	102
**5**	**Dallas Stars**	**PA**	**82**	**45**	**30**	**7**	**242**	**207**	97
**6**	**Colorado Avalanche**	**NW**	**82**	**44**	**31**	**7**	**231**	**219**	95
**7**	**Calgary Flames**	**NW**	**82**	**42**	**30**	**10**	**229**	**227**	94
**8**	**Nashville Predators**	**CE**	**82**	**41**	**32**	**9**	**230**	**229**	91
8.5
9	Edmonton Oilers	NW	82	41	35	6	235	251	88
10	Chicago Blackhawks	CE	82	40	34	8	239	235	88
11	Vancouver Canucks	NW	82	39	33	10	213	215	88
12	Phoenix Coyotes	PA	82	38	37	7	214	231	83
13	Columbus Blue Jackets	CE	82	34	36	12	193	218	80
14	St. Louis Blues	CE	82	33	36	13	205	237	79
15	Los Angeles Kings	PA	82	32	43	7	231	266	71

Divisions: PA – Pacific, CE – Central, NW – Northwest
bold – qualified for playoffs, y – division winner, p – Presidents' Trophy winner

== Schedule and results ==
2007–08 regular season
October: 6–4–0 (home: 4–2–0; road: 2–2–0)

Game	Date	Visitor	Score	Home	OT	Decision	Attendance	Record	Points	Recap
1	October 4	St. Louis	2 – 3	Phoenix		Legace	17,799	0–1–0	0	L
2	October 6	St. Louis	5 – 3	Los Angeles		Toivonen	18,118	1–1–0	2	W
3	October 10	Nashville	4 – 1	St. Louis		Legace	19,150	2–1–0	4	W
4	October 12	Colorado	4 – 1	St. Louis		Legace	19,150	3–1–0	6	W
5	October 17	St. Louis	3 – 1	Chicago		Legace	10,002	4–1–0	8	W
6	October 20	Minnesota	3 – 1	St. Louis		Legace	19,150	4–2–0	8	L
7	October 23	Anaheim	2 – 4	St. Louis		Legace	14,764	5–2–0	10	W
8	October 25	St. Louis	0 – 3	Columbus		Toivonen	12,786	5–3–0	10	L
9	October 27	Washington	3 – 4	St. Louis		Legace	16,863	6–3–0	12	W
10	October 30	Phoenix	1 – 2	St. Louis		Legace	14,222	6–4–0	12	L

November: 8–4–1 (home: 5–1–0; road: 3–3–1)

Game	Date	Visitor	Score	Home	OT	Decision	Attendance	Record	Points	Recap
11	November 1	St. Louis	3 – 2	Minnesota		Legace	18,568	7–4–0	14	W
12	November 3	Chicago	3 – 2	St. Louis		Legace	19,150	7–5–0	14	L
13	November 4	St. Louis	0 – 3	Columbus		Toivonen	13,254	7–6–0	14	L
14	November 9	St. Louis	2 – 4	Chicago		Legace	16,149	7–7–0	14	L
15	November 13	Detroit	3 – 4	St. Louis		Legace	18,440	8–7–0	16	W
16	November 16	Columbus	2 – 3	St. Louis		Legace	19,150	9–7–0	18	W
17	November 17	St. Louis	3 – 2	Nashville	SO	Toivonen	15,246	10–7–0	20	W
18	November 19	Nashville	1 – 2	St. Louis		Legace	15,239	11–7–0	22	W
19	November 21	St. Louis	0 – 3	Detroit		Legace	19,124	11–8–0	22	L
20	November 23	Vancouver	1 – 3	St. Louis		Toivonen	18,721	12–8–0	24	W
21	November 25	Calgary	0 – 3	St. Louis		Legace	15,138	13–8–0	26	W
22	November 28	St. Louis	4 – 3	Buffalo		Legace	18,690	14–8–0	28	W
23	November 30	St. Louis	2 – 3	Minnesota	OT	Legace	18,568	14–8–1	29	OTL

December: 5–6–3 (home: 2–4–2; road: 3–2–1)

Game	Date	Visitor	Score	Home	OT	Decision	Attendance	Record	Points	Recap
24	December 1	Chicago	1 – 3	St. Louis		Toivonen	19,150	15–8–1	31	W
25	December 4	St. Louis	1 – 3	Calgary		Toivonen	19,289	15–9–1	31	L
26	December 7	St. Louis	4 – 3	Edmonton		Toivonen	16,839	16–9–1	33	W
27	December 9	St. Louis	5 – 9	Colorado		Toivonen	15,476	16–10–1	33	L
28	December 11	Edmonton	5 – 4	St. Louis	SO	Toivonen	14,329	16–10–2	34	OTL
29	December 13	Florida	1 – 0	St. Louis		Legace	14,088	16–11–2	34	L
30	December 16	Calgary	5 – 3	St. Louis		Legace	16,733	16–12–2	34	L
31	December 20	Detroit	2 – 3	St. Louis		Legace	19,150	17–12–2	36	W
32	December 22	St. Louis	4 – 1	Boston		Legace	14,200	18–12–2	38	W
33	December 23	Atlanta	3 – 2	St. Louis	OT	Legace	17,731	18–12–3	39	OTL
34	December 26	Detroit	5 – 0	St. Louis		Legace	19,250	18–13–3	39	L
35	December 28	San Jose	1 – 0	St. Louis		Legace	19,250	18–14–3	39	L
36	December 29	St. Louis	4 – 5	Dallas	SO	Toivonen	18,532	18–14–4	40	OTL
37	December 31	St. Louis	2 – 0	Detroit		Legace	20,066	19–14–4	42	W

January: 4–5–3 (home: 3–1–2; road: 1–4–1)

Game	Date	Visitor	Score	Home	OT	Decision	Attendance	Record	Points	Recap
38	January 2	Edmonton	3 – 2	St. Louis	OT	Toivonen	14,465	19–14–5	43	OTL
39	January 5	Carolina	0 – 1	St. Louis		Legace	19,150	20–14–5	45	W
40	January 8	Columbus	1 – 6	St. Louis		Legace	14,818	21–14–5	47	W
41	January 10	Dallas	2 – 4	St. Louis		Legace	16,805	22–14–5	49	W
42	January 11	St. Louis	4 – 6	Columbus		Toivonen	15,233	22–15–5	49	L
43	January 13	Vancouver	4 – 3	St. Louis	SO	Legace	16,828	22–15–6	50	OTL
44	January 16	St. Louis	1 – 6	Chicago		Schwarz	17,570	22–16–6	50	L
45	January 19	Nashville	5 – 2	St. Louis		Legace	19,275	22–17–6	50	L
46	January 21	St. Louis	3 – 6	Nashville		Legace	13,642	22–18–6	50	L
47	January 23	St. Louis	2 – 3	Vancouver	SO	Legace	18,630	22–18–7	51	OTL
48	January 24	St. Louis	1 – 4	San Jose		Legace	17,142	22–19–7	51	L
49	January 29	St. Louis	3 – 2	Toronto		Legace	19,363	23–19–7	53	W

February: 5–7–3 (home: 4–4–1; road: 1–3–2)

Game	Date	Visitor	Score	Home	OT	Decision	Attendance	Record	Points	Recap
50	February 1	Anaheim	0 – 1	St. Louis	SO	Legace	19,150	24–19–7	55	W
51	February 2	Colorado	6 – 4	St. Louis		Legace	19,150	24–20–7	55	L
52	February 5	Tampa Bay	5 – 4	St. Louis		Legace	17,150	24–21–7	55	L
53	February 9	St. Louis	2 – 6	Dallas		Toivonen	18,584	24–22–7	55	L
54	February 10	Minnesota	2 – 1	St. Louis	SO	Legace	16,477	24–22–8	56	OTL
55	February 12	Los Angeles	2 – 4	St. Louis		Legace	15,688	25–22–8	58	W
56	February 14	St. Louis	4 – 1	Colorado		Legace	17,131	26–22–8	60	W
57	February 16	St. Louis	1 – 2	Nashville	OT	Legace	17,113	26–22–9	61	OTL
58	February 17	Columbus	1 – 5	St. Louis		Legace	19,150	27–22–9	63	W
59	February 19	Chicago	1 – 5	St. Louis		Legace	19,150	28–22–9	65	W
60	February 21	St. Louis	1 – 5	Los Angeles		Legace	14,132	28–23–9	65	L
61	February 22	St. Louis	1 – 2	Anaheim	OT	Legace	17,174	28–23–10	66	OTL
62	February 24	St. Louis	0 – 2	Phoenix		Legace	14,845	28–24–10	66	L
63	February 26	Dallas	3 – 1	St. Louis		Legace	19,150	28–25–10	66	L
64	February 28	Phoenix	2 – 1	St. Louis		Legace	17,867	28–26–10	66	L

March: 3–9–2 (home: 1–3–0; road: 2–6–2)

Game	Date	Visitor	Score	Home	OT	Decision	Attendance	Record	Points	Recap
65	March 1	San Jose	2 – 0	St. Louis		Legace	19,150	28–27–10	66	L
66	March 4	Los Angeles	2 – 3	St. Louis		Legace	14,973	29–27–10	68	W
67	March 5	St. Louis	1 – 4	Detroit		Legace	18,064	29–28–10	68	L
68	March 8	St. Louis	2 – 4	Vancouver		Legace	18,630	29–29–10	68	L
69	March 10	St. Louis	3 – 7	Calgary		Toivonen	19,289	29–30–10	68	L
70	March 11	St. Louis	3 – 4	Edmonton	OT	Legace	16,839	29–30–11	69	OTL
71	March 14	St. Louis	1 – 4	San Jose		Toivonen	17,496	29–31–11	69	L
72	March 15	St. Louis	2 – 5	Anaheim		Legace	17,174	29–32–11	69	L
73	March 18	St. Louis	4 – 3	Montreal	SO	Legace	21,273	30–32–11	71	W
74	March 20	St. Louis	2 – 3	Ottawa		Toivonen	20,027	30–33–11	71	L
75	March 23	St. Louis	3 – 4	Chicago	OT	Toivonen	19,146	30–33–12	72	OTL
76	March 25	Detroit	2 – 1	St. Louis		Legace	19,150	30–34–12	72	L
77	March 28	St. Louis	4 – 3	Detroit	OT	Legace	20,066	31–34–12	74	W
78	March 29	Chicago	4 – 3	St. Louis		Legace	19,150	31–35–12	74	L

April: 2–1–1 (home: 1–0–1; road: 1–1–0)

Game	Date	Visitor	Score	Home	OT	Decision	Attendance	Record	Points	Recap
79	April 1	Nashville	4 – 3	St. Louis	OT	Toivonen	17,357	31–35–13	75	OTL
80	April 3	St. Louis	2 – 3	Nashville		Toivonen	17,113	31–36–13	75	L
81	April 5	Columbus	0 – 3	St. Louis		Legace	19,150	32–36–13	77	W
82	April 6	St. Louis	4 – 1	Columbus		Toivonen	17,739	33–36–13	79	W

Legend: W Win (2 points) L Loss (0 points) OTL Overtime/shootout loss (1 point)

== Player statistics ==
=== Skaters ===
Note: GP = Games played; G = Goals; A = Assists; Pts = Points; PIM = Penalty minutes

Player	GP	G	A	Pts	PIM
David Backes	72	13	18	31	99
Christian Backman **	45	1	9	10	30
Brad Boyes	82	43	22	65	20
Eric Brewer	77	1	20	21	91
Micki DuPont	2	0	0	0	2
Mike Glumac	4	0	0	0	5
Dan Hinote	58	5	5	10	42
Barret Jackman	78	2	14	16	93
Cam Janssen	12	0	1	1	18
Erik Johnson	69	5	28	33	28
Mike Johnson *	21	2	3	5	8
Ryan Johnson	79	5	13	18	22
Paul Kariya	82	16	49	65	50
D. J. King	61	3	3	6	100
Manny Legace	66	0	2	2	4
Jamal Mayers	80	12	15	27	91
Jay McClement	81	9	13	22	26
Andy McDonald	49	14	22	36	32
Jay McKee	66	2	7	9	42
David Perron	62	13	14	27	38
Roman Polak	6	0	1	1	0
Martin Rucinsky	40	5	11	16	40
Bryce Salvador **	56	1	10	11	43
Yan Stastny	12	1	1	2	9
Lee Stempniak	80	13	25	38	40
Keith Tkachuk	79	27	31	58	69
Hannu Toivonen	23	0	0	0	2
Steve Wagner	24	2	6	8	8
Matt Walker	43	1	1	2	61
Doug Weight **	29	4	7	11	12
Jeff Woywitka	27	2	6	8	12
TOTALS	82	205	357	562	1,137

* out for season with injury
** traded away

through April 6, 2008

=== Goaltenders ===
Note: GP = Games played; TOI = Time on ice (minutes); W = Wins; L = Losses; OT = Overtime/shootout losses; GA = Goals against; SO = Shutouts; SA = Shots against; Sv% = Save percentage; GAA = Goals against average

Player	GP	TOI	W	L	OT	GA	SO	SA	Sv%	GAA
Manny Legace	66	3,666	27	25	8	147	5	1,648	.911	2.41
Hannu Toivonen	23	1,202	6	10	5	69	0	566	.878	3.44
Chris Beckford-Tseu	1	27	0	0	0	1	0	9	.889	2.22
Marek Schwarz	2	50	0	1	0	6	0	17	.647	7.20
TOTALS	82	4,945	33	36	13	223	5	2,240	.900	2.71

through April 6, 2008

== Awards and records ==
=== Milestones ===
Regular Season
Player	Milestone	Reached
Erik Johnson	1st NHL Game; 1st NHL Assist; 1st NHL Point	October 4, 2007
Steve Wagner	1st NHL Game	October 4, 2007
Erik Johnson	1st NHL Goal	October 6, 2007
Steve Wagner	1st NHL Assist; 1st NHL Point	October 6, 2007
David Perron	1st NHL Game; 1st NHL Assist; 1st NHL Point	October 12, 2007
Martin Rucinsky	600th NHL Point	October 20, 2007
Steve Wagner	1st NHL Goal	October 20, 2007
Dan Hinote	400th NHL Game	October 27, 2007
Keith Tkachuk	1,000th NHL Game	December 1, 2007
Barret Jackman	500th NHL Penalty Minute	December 20, 2007
Matt Walker	1st NHL Goal	February 17, 2008
Andy McDonald	100th NHL Goal	February 17, 2008
Ryan Johnson	100th NHL Point	March 4, 2008
Andy Murray	600th NHL Coaching Game	March 5, 2008
Keith Tkachuk	500th NHL Goal	April 6, 2008

== Transactions ==
The Blues have been involved in the following transactions during the 2007–08 season.

=== Trades ===
June 26, 2007	To St. Louis Blues Keith Tkachuk conditional 4th round pick in 2008	To Atlanta Thrashers conditional 1st round pick in 2008
July 23, 2007	To St. Louis Blues Hannu Toivonen	To Boston Bruins Carl Soderberg
August 1, 2007	To St. Louis Blues Francois-Pierre Guenette	To Vancouver Canucks Zack Fitzgerald
November 8, 2007	To St. Louis Blues 7th round pick in 2008 entry draft	To Colorado Avalanche Jason Bacashihua
December 14, 2007	To St. Louis Blues Andy McDonald	To Anaheim Ducks Doug Weight; Michael Birner; 7th round pick in 2008 – Paul Karpowich
February 26, 2008	To St. Louis Blues Cam Janssen	To New Jersey Devils Bryce Salvador
February 26, 2008	To St. Louis Blues 4th round pick in 2008 – Dale Weise	To New York Rangers Christian Backman
June 4, 2008	To St. Louis Blues T. J. Fast	To Los Angeles Kings 5th round draft pick in 2009 – Wade Megan
June 19, 2008	To St. Louis Blues 3rd round pick in 2008 – James Livingston	To Toronto Maple Leafs Jamal Mayers
June 20, 2008	To St. Louis Blues Chris Mason	To Nashville Predators 4th round pick in 2008 – Dale Weise

=== Free agents ===
Player	Former team	Contract Terms (Yrs., $Total / yr.)
Alex Brooks	New Jersey Devils	1 year, $500,000
Paul Kariya	Nashville Predators	3 years, $6 million
David Perron	Lewiston Maineiacs (QMJHL)	$875,000
Yan Stastny	Boston Bruins	$605,000

Player	New team
Radek Dvorak	Florida Panthers
Curtis Sanford	Vancouver Canucks
Jamie Rivers	Montreal Canadiens
Dallas Drake	Detroit Red Wings
Jon DiSalvatore	Phoenix Coyotes

=== Contract renewals ===
Player	Contract Terms (yrs., $Total / yr.)
Jason Bacashihua	1 year, $643,720
D. J. King	3 years, $1.6 million
Matt Walker	1 year, $600,000
Jeff Woywitka	1 year, $689,700
Barret Jackman	4 years, $3.6 million
Brad Boyes	4 years, $4.0 million
David Backes	3 years, $2.5 million (Jul. 1, 2008)

=== Signed prospects ===
Player	Signing Date
T. J. Oshie (C)	May 13

== Draft picks ==
St. Louis' picks at the 2007 NHL entry draft in Columbus, Ohio.

Round	#	Player	Position	Nationality	College/Junior/Club team (League)
1	13	Lars Eller	C	Denmark	Frölunda HC (SEL)
1	18	Ian Cole	D	United States	U.S. National Team Development Program (NAHL)
1	26	David Perron	LW	Canada	Lewiston Maineiacs (QMJHL)
2	39	Simon Hjalmarsson	RW	Sweden	Frölunda HC (Swe Jr.)
2	44	Aaron Palushaj	RW	United States	Des Moines Buccaneers (USHL)
3	85	Brett Sonne	C/LW	Canada	Calgary Hitmen (WHL)
4	96	Cade Fairchild	D	United States	U.S. National Team Development Program (NAHL)
4	100	Travis Erstad	C/RW	United States	Lincoln Stars (USHL)
6	160	Anthony Peluso	D	Canada	Erie Otters (OHL)
7	190	Trevor Nill	C	United States	Detroit Compuware (Michigan midget)

== Farm teams ==
=== Peoria Rivermen ===
The Peoria Rivermen are the Blues American Hockey League affiliate in 2007–08.

=== Alaska Aces ===
The Alaska Aces are the Blues affiliate in the ECHL.

== See also ==
- 2007–08 NHL season
- St. Louis Blues seasons
