= List of St. Louis Blues seasons =

The St. Louis Blues are a professional ice hockey team based in St. Louis. The team is a member of the Central Division of the Western Conference of the National Hockey League (NHL). Since their inception in 1967, the Blues have reached four Stanley Cup Final, winning in 2019.

== Table key ==
Key of colors and symbols
Color/symbol	Explanation
†	Stanley Cup champions
‡	Conference champions
↑	Division champions
#	Led league in points

Key of terms and abbreviations
Term or abbreviation	Definition
Finish	Final position in division or league standings
GP	Number of games played
W	Number of wins
L	Number of losses
T	Number of ties
OT	Number of losses in overtime (since the 1999–2000 season)
Pts	Number of points
GF	Goals for (goals scored by the Blues)
GA	Goals against (goals scored by the Blues' opponents)
—	Does not apply

== Year by year ==
Season	Blues season	Conference	Division	Regular season									Postseason						
Season	Blues season	Conference	Division	Finish	GP	W	L	T	OT	Pts	GF	GA	GP	W	L	OT	GF	GA	Result
1967–68	1967–68	—	West	3rd	74	27	31	16	—	70	177	191	18	8	10	—	42	50	Won in quarterfinals, 4–3 (Flyers); Won in semifinals, 4–3 (North Stars); Lost Stanley Cup Final, 0–4 (Canadiens)
1968–69	1968–69	—	West↑	1st	76	37	25	14	—	88	204	157	12	8	4	—	36	20	Won in quarterfinals, 4–0 (Flyers); Won in semifinals, 4–0 (Kings); Lost Stanley Cup Final, 0–4 (Canadiens)
1969–70	1969–70	—	West↑	1st	76	37	27	12	—	86	224	179	16	8	8	—	46	46	Won in quarterfinals, 4–2 (North Stars); Won in semifinals, 4–2 (Penguins); Lost Stanley Cup Final, 0–4 (Bruins)
1970–71	1970–71	—	West	2nd	78	34	25	19	—	87	223	208	6	2	4	—	15	16	Lost in quarterfinals, 2–4 (North Stars)
1971–72	1971–72	–	West	3rd	78	28	39	11	—	67	208	247	11	4	7	—	27	47	Won in quarterfinals, 4–3 (North Stars); Lost in semifinals, 0–4 (Bruins)
1972–73	1972–73	—	West	4th	78	32	34	12	—	76	233	251	5	1	4	—	9	22	Lost in quarterfinals, 1–4 (Black Hawks)
1973–74	1973–74	—	West	6th	78	26	40	12	—	64	206	248	—	—	—	—	—	—	Did not qualify
1974–75	1974–75	Campbell	Smythe	2nd	80	35	31	14	—	84	269	267	2	0	2	—	6	9	Lost in preliminary round, 0–2 (Penguins)
1975–76	1975–76	Campbell	Smythe	3rd	80	29	37	14	—	72	249	290	3	1	2	—	8	7	Lost in preliminary round, 1–2 (Sabres)
1976–77	1976–77	Campbell	Smythe↑	1st	80	32	39	9	—	73	239	276	4	0	4	—	4	19	Lost in quarterfinals, 0–4 (Canadiens)
1977–78	1977–78	Campbell	Smythe	4th	80	20	47	13	—	53	195	304	—	—	—	—	—	—	Did not qualify
1978–79	1978–79	Campbell	Smythe	3rd	80	18	50	12	—	48	249	348	—	—	—	—	—	—	Did not qualify
1979–80	1979–80	Campbell	Smythe	2nd	80	34	34	12	—	80	266	278	3	0	3	—	4	12	Lost in preliminary round, 0–3 (Black Hawks)
1980–81	1980–81	Campbell	Smythe↑	1st	80	45	18	17	—	107	352	281	11	5	6	—	42	50	Won in preliminary round, 3–2 (Penguins); Lost in quarterfinals, 2–4 (Rangers)
1981–82	1981–82	Campbell	Norris	3rd	80	32	40	8	—	72	315	349	10	5	5	—	39	36	Won in division semifinals, 3–1 (Jets); Lost in division finals, 2–4 (Black Hawks)
1982–83	1982–83	Campbell	Norris	4th	80	25	40	15	—	65	285	316	4	1	3	—	10	16	Lost in division semifinals, 1–3 (Black Hawks)
1983–84	1983–84	Campbell	Norris	2nd	80	32	41	7	—	71	293	316	11	6	5	—	30	31	Won in division semifinals, 3–1 (Red Wings); Lost in division finals, 3–4 (North Stars)
1984–85	1984–85	Campbell	Norris↑	1st	80	37	31	12	—	86	299	288	3	0	3	—	5	9	Lost in division semifinals, 0–3 (North Stars)
1985–86	1985–86	Campbell	Norris	3rd	80	37	34	9	—	83	302	291	19	10	9	—	64	70	Won in division semifinals, 3–2 (North Stars); Won in division finals, 4–3 (Maple Leafs); Lost in conference finals, 3–4 (Flames)
1986–87	1986–87	Campbell	Norris↑	1st	80	32	33	15	—	79	281	293	6	2	4	—	12	15	Lost in division semifinals, 2–4 (Maple Leafs)
1987–88	1987–88	Campbell	Norris	2nd	80	34	38	8	—	76	278	294	10	5	5	—	35	38	Won in division semifinals, 4–1 (Blackhawks); Lost in division finals, 1–4 (Red Wings)
1988–89	1988–89	Campbell	Norris	2nd	80	33	35	12	—	78	275	285	10	5	5	—	35	34	Won in division semifinals, 4–1 (North Stars); Lost in division finals, 1–4 (Blackhawks)
1989–90	1989–90	Campbell	Norris	2nd	80	37	34	9	—	83	295	279	12	7	5	—	42	44	Won in division semifinals, 4–1 (Maple Leafs); Lost in division finals, 3–4 (Blackhawks)
1990–91	1990–91	Campbell	Norris	2nd	80	47	22	11	—	105	310	250	13	6	7	—	41	42	Won in division semifinals, 4–3 (Red Wings); Lost in division finals, 2–4 (North Stars)
1991–92	1991–92	Campbell	Norris	3rd	80	36	33	11	—	83	279	266	6	2	4	—	19	23	Lost in division semifinals, 2–4 (Blackhawks)
1992–93	1992–93	Campbell	Norris	4th	84	37	36	11	—	85	282	278	11	7	4	—	24	28	Won in division semifinals, 4–0 (Blackhawks); Lost in division finals, 3–4 (Maple Leafs)
1993–94	1993–94	Western	Central	4th	84	40	33	11	—	91	270	283	4	0	4	—	10	16	Lost in conference quarterfinals, 0–4 (Stars)
1994–95^{1}	1994–95	Western	Central	2nd	48	28	15	5	—	61	178	135	7	3	4	—	27	27	Lost in conference quarterfinals, 3–4 (Canucks)
1995–96	1995–96	Western	Central	4th	82	32	34	16	—	80	219	248	13	7	6	—	37	37	Won in conference quarterfinals, 4–2 (Maple Leafs); Lost in conference semifinals, 3–4 (Red Wings)
1996–97	1996–97	Western	Central	4th	82	36	35	11	—	83	236	239	6	2	4	—	12	13	Lost in conference quarterfinals, 2–4 (Red Wings)
1997–98	1997–98	Western	Central	3rd	82	45	29	8	—	98	256	204	10	6	4	—	29	31	Won in conference quarterfinals, 4–0 (Kings); Lost in conference semifinals, 2–4 (Red Wings)
1998–99	1998–99	Western	Central	2nd	82	37	32	13	—	87	237	209	13	6	7	—	31	33	Won in conference quarterfinals, 4–3 (Coyotes); Lost in conference semifinals, 2–4 (Stars)
1999–2000	1999–2000	Western	Central↑	1st	82	51	19	11	1	114#	248	165	7	3	4	—	22	20	Lost in conference quarterfinals, 3–4 (Sharks)
2000–01	2000–01	Western	Central	2nd	82	43	22	12	5	103	249	195	15	9	6	—	40	34	Won in conference quarterfinals, 4–2 (Sharks); Won in conference semifinals, 4–0 (Stars); Lost in conference finals, 1–4 (Avalanche)
2001–02	2001–02	Western	Central	2nd	82	43	27	8	4	98	227	188	10	5	5	—	24	19	Won in conference quarterfinals, 4–1 (Blackhawks); Lost in conference semifinals, 1–4 (Red Wings)
2002–03	2002–03	Western	Central	2nd	82	41	24	11	6	99	253	222	7	3	4	—	21	17	Lost in conference quarterfinals, 3–4 (Canucks)
2003–04	2003–04	Western	Central	2nd	82	39	30	11	2	91	191	198	5	1	4	—	9	12	Lost in conference quarterfinals, 1–4 (Sharks)
2004–05	2004–05	Season cancelled due to the 2004–05 NHL lockout																	
2005–06^{2}	2005–06	Western	Central	5th	82	21	46	—	15	57	197	292	—	—	—	—	—	—	Did not qualify
2006–07	2006–07	Western	Central	3rd	82	34	35	—	13	81	214	254	—	—	—	—	—	—	Did not qualify
2007–08	2007–08	Western	Central	5th	82	33	36	—	13	79	205	237	—	—	—	—	—	—	Did not qualify
2008–09	2008–09	Western	Central	3rd	82	41	31	—	10	92	233	233	4	0	4	—	5	11	Lost in conference quarterfinals, 0–4 (Canucks)
2009–10	2009–10	Western	Central	4th	82	40	32	—	10	90	225	223	—	—	—	—	—	—	Did not qualify
2010–11	2010–11	Western	Central	4th	82	38	33	—	11	87	240	234	—	—	—	—	—	—	Did not qualify
2011–12	2011–12	Western	Central↑	1st	82	49	22	—	11	109	210	165	9	4	5	—	20	23	Won in conference quarterfinals, 4–1 (Sharks); Lost in conference semifinals, 0–4 (Kings)
2012–13^{3}	2012–13	Western	Central	2nd	48	29	17	—	2	60	129	115	6	2	4	—	10	12	Lost in conference quarterfinals, 2–4 (Kings)
2013–14	2013–14	Western	Central	2nd	82	52	23	—	7	111	248	191	6	2	4	—	14	20	Lost in first round, 2–4 (Blackhawks)
2014–15	2014–15	Western	Central↑	1st	82	51	24	—	7	109	248	201	6	2	4	—	14	17	Lost in first round, 2–4 (Wild)
2015–16	2015–16	Western	Central	2nd	82	49	24	—	9	107	224	201	20	10	10	—	57	56	Won in first round, 4–3 (Blackhawks); Won in second round, 4–3 (Stars); Lost in conference finals, 2–4 (Sharks)
2016–17	2016–17	Western	Central	3rd	82	46	29	—	7	99	235	218	11	6	5	—	22	23	Won in first round, 4–1 (Wild); Lost in second round, 2–4 (Predators)
2017–18	2017–18	Western	Central	5th	82	44	32	—	6	94	226	222	—	—	—	—	—	—	Did not qualify
2018–19	2018–19	Western‡	Central	3rd	82	45	28	—	9	99	247	223	26	16	10	—	75	70	Won in first round, 4–2 (Jets); Won in second round, 4–3 (Stars); Won in conference finals, 4–2 (Sharks); Won Stanley Cup Final, 4–3 (Bruins)†
2019–20^{4}	2019–20	Western	Central↑	1st	71	42	19	—	10	94	225	193	9	2	6	1	22	32	Finished fourth in seeding round-robin (0–2–1); Lost in first round, 2–4 (Canucks)
2020–21^{5}	2020–21	—	West	4th	56	27	20	—	9	63	169	170	4	0	4	—	7	20	Lost first round, 0–4 (Avalanche)
2021–22	2021–22	Western	Central	3rd	82	49	22	—	11	109	311	242	12	6	6	—	40	38	Won in first round, 4–2 (Wild); Lost in second round, 2–4 (Avalanche)
2022–23	2022–23	Western	Central	6th	82	37	38	—	7	81	263	301	—	—	—	—	—	—	Did not qualify
2023–24	2023–24	Western	Central	5th	82	43	33	—	6	92	239	250	—	—	—	—	—	—	Did not qualify
2024–25	2024–25	Western	Central	5th	82	44	30	—	8	96	254	233	7	3	4	—	27	21	Lost in first round, 3–4 (Jets)
2025–26	2025–26	Western	Central	5th	82	37	33	—	12	86	231	258	—	—	—	—	—	—	Did not qualify
Totals					4,583	2,139	1,801	303	211	4,921	14,125	13,972	423	191	231	1	1,170	1,286	46 playoff appearances

^{1} Season was shortened due to the 1994–95 NHL lockout.
^{2} As of the 2005–06 NHL season, all games will have a winner; the OTL column includes SOL (Shootout losses).
^{3} Season was shortened due to the 2012–13 NHL lockout.
^{4} The 2019–20 NHL season was suspended on March 12, 2020, due to the COVID-19 pandemic.
^{5} Due to the COVID-19 pandemic, the 2020–21 NHL season was shortened to 56 games.

=== All-time records ===
Statistic	GP	W	L	T	OT
Regular season record (1967–present)	4,501	2,102	1,768	432	199
Postseason record (1967–present)	423	191	231	—	1
All-time regular and postseason record	4,924	2,293	1,999	432	200
All-time series record: 32–45
