= Steve Pleau =

American ice hockey coach

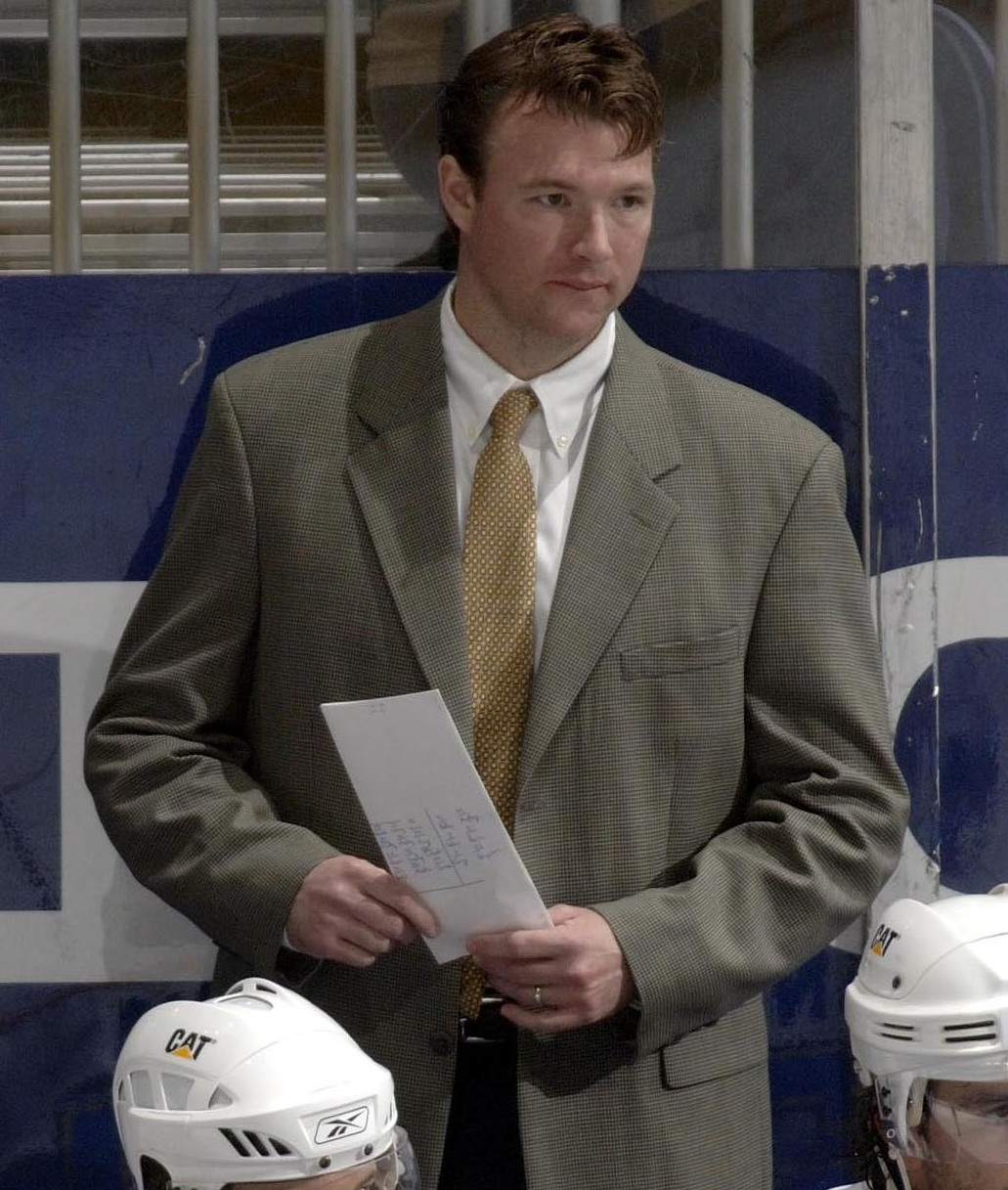
- Pleau in 2006
- Born: February 11, 1973 (age 53) Seabrook, New Hampshire, U.S.
- Height: 5 ft 11 in (180 cm)
- Weight: 185 lb (84 kg; 13 st 3 lb)
- Position: Forward
- NHL draft: Undrafted
- Playing career: 1992–1996

Steve Pleau (born February 11, 1973) is an American former ice hockey coach. He is currently employed by the Calgary Flames of the National Hockey League (NHL) as their head professional scout.

Pleau was an assistant head coach with the Worcester IceCats of the American Hockey League (AHL) from 1998 to 2005. On June 16, 2005, he was named the head coach of the Peoria Rivermen for the 2005–06 AHL season, replacing Don Granato who was receiving treatment for cancer. Pleau was named the head coach for the Edmonton Oil Kings of the Western Hockey League (WHL) on June 22, 2007, remaining in that position until 2010.

== Family ==
Steve Pleau is the son of the former Montreal Canadiens' centre Larry Pleau.
