= Graham Mink =

American ice hockey player

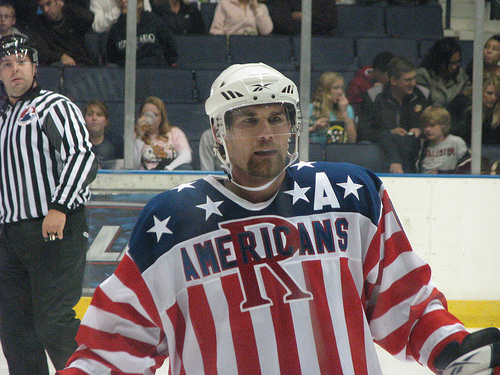
- Born: May 21, 1979 (age 47) Newport, Vermont, U.S.
- Height: 6 ft 3 in (191 cm)
- Weight: 220 lb (100 kg; 15 st 10 lb)
- Position: Right Wing
- Shot: Right
- Played for: Washington Capitals; Dornbirner EC
- NHL draft: Undrafted
- Playing career: 2001–2014

Graham Christian Mink (born May 21, 1979) is an American former professional ice hockey winger.

== Playing career ==
Undrafted, Mink originally played high school hockey with Stowe High School, winning the Division III state championship in his sophomore year and Division II state championship in his senior year. After high school, he attended Northfield Mount Hermon school for a post graduate year. He then was a recruited walk on to play collegiate hockey with the University of Vermont in the ECAC. After an unimpressive freshman year, Mink gradually improved within the Catamounts and in his junior year placed second on the team in scoring with 17 goals and 29 points in 32 games. Just prior to his senior year in 2001–02, Mink left Vermont and turned pro, signing with the Portland Pirates on September 25, 2001.

In his first professional season, Mink made his debut in the ECHL, appearing in 29 games with the Richmond Renegades before moving up to the Pirates. Following an impressive 34 points in 56 games, Mink was signed by their NHL affiliate, the Washington Capitals for the 2002–03 season and continued to play for the Pirates and later on the Hershey Bears, helping them as an assistant captain to the 2006 and 2009 Calder Cups.

On July 8, 2009, Graham signed a two-year free agent deal with the Florida Panthers. He was then assigned to AHL affiliate, the Rochester Americans where he served as an alternate captain for the 2009–10 season.

On August 3, 2010, Mink was traded by the Panthers to the St. Louis Blues in exchange for T.J. Fast.

On July 13, 2011, Mink left the Peoria Rivermen and signed a one-year American Hockey League contract to return to the Hershey Bears for the 2011–12 AHL season.

After 12 seasons of professional hockey in predominantly the AHL, Mink was signed to his first European contract, agreeing to a one-year deal with Dornbirner EC of the Austrian Hockey League on August 10, 2013. Mink played one season with Dornbirner, totaling 23 goals and 23 assists in 51 games before retiring from hockey.

== Personal ==
Mink is married and has two children. He also has his insurance and real estate license in his home state of Vermont.

== Career statistics ==
			Regular season					Playoffs
Season	Team	League	GP	G	A	Pts	PIM	GP	G	A	Pts	PIM
1998–99	University of Vermont	HE	27	4	2	6	34	—	—	—	—	—
1999–00	University of Vermont	HE	17	7	4	11	18	—	—	—	—	—
2000–01	University of Vermont	HE	32	17	12	29	52	—	—	—	—	—
2001–02	Richmond Renegades	ECHL	29	8	9	17	78	—	—	—	—	—
2001–02	Portland Pirates	AHL	56	17	17	34	50	—	—	—	—	—
2002–03	Portland Pirates	AHL	71	22	15	37	115	—	—	—	—	—
2003–04	Portland Pirates	AHL	68	18	19	37	74	3	0	1	1	4
2003–04	Washington Capitals	NHL	2	0	0	0	2	—	—	—	—	—
2004–05	Portland Pirates	AHL	63	18	21	39	86	—	—	—	—	—
2005–06	Hershey Bears	AHL	43	21	19	40	50	21	8	13	21	29
2005–06	Washington Capitals	NHL	3	0	0	0	0	—	—	—	—	—
2006–07	Worcester Sharks	AHL	61	31	32	63	52	6	1	5	6	8
2007–08	Worcester Sharks	AHL	71	24	31	55	67	—	—	—	—	—
2008–09	Hershey Bears	AHL	68	32	27	59	101	22	7	8	15	16
2008–09	Washington Capitals	NHL	2	0	0	0	0	—	—	—	—	—
2009–10	Rochester Americans	AHL	67	20	17	37	86	6	3	2	5	23
2010–11	Peoria Rivermen	AHL	70	24	26	50	122	4	0	0	0	10
2011–12	Hershey Bears	AHL	48	16	26	42	55	5	0	1	1	4
2012–13	Providence Bruins	AHL	33	10	8	18	8	7	3	0	3	14
2013–14	Dornbirner EC	EBEL	51	23	23	46	87	—	—	—	—	—
AHL totals			719	253	258	511	866	74	22	30	52	108
NHL totals			7	0	0	0	2	—	—	—	—	—
