= Bryce Salvador =

Canadian ice hockey player

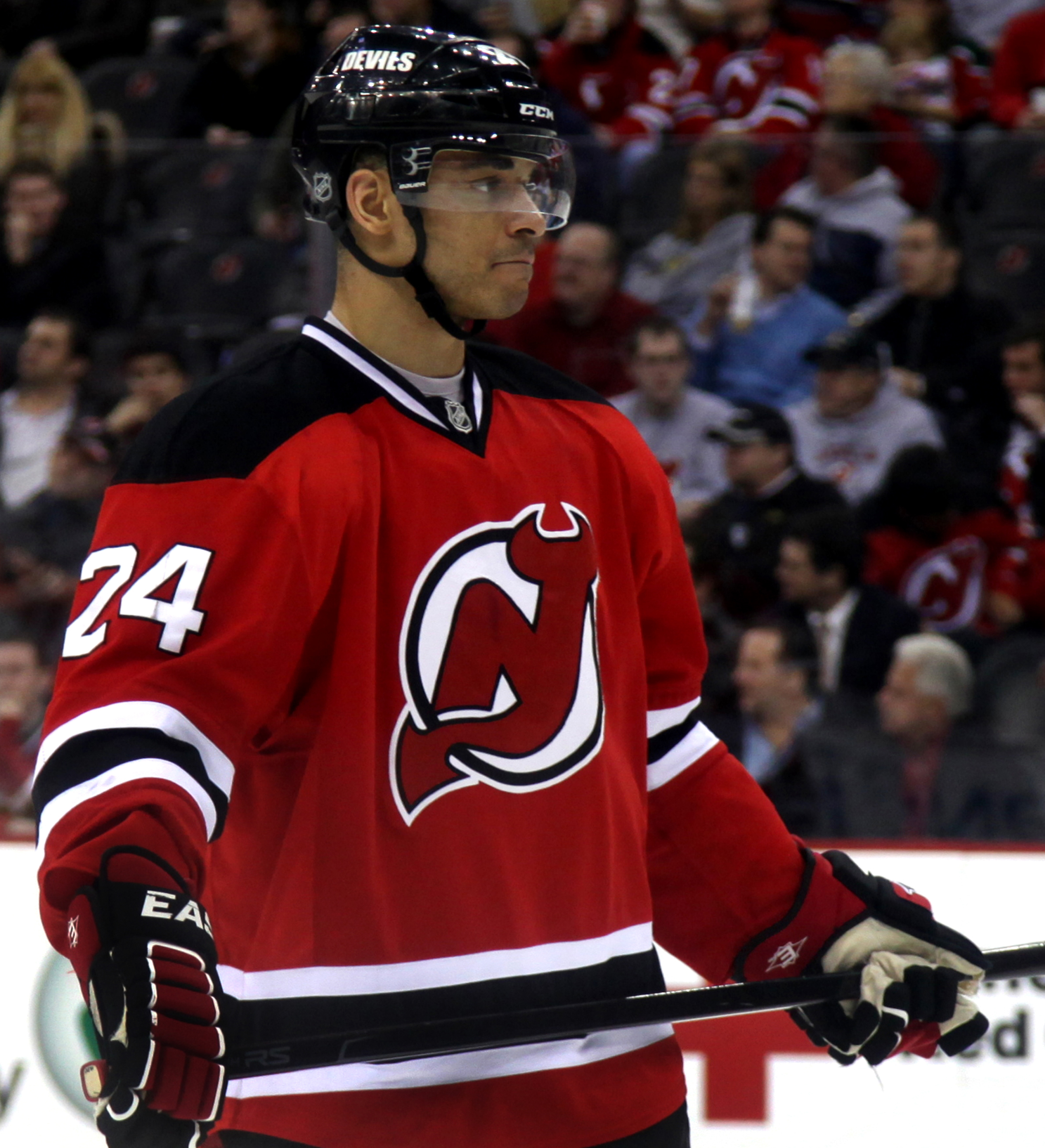
- Salvador with the New Jersey Devils in 2012
- Born: February 11, 1976 (age 50) Brandon, Manitoba, Canada
- Height: 6 ft 2 in (188 cm)
- Weight: 220 lb (100 kg; 15 st 10 lb)
- Position: Defence
- Shot: Left
- Played for: St. Louis Blues; New Jersey Devils
- NHL draft: 138th overall, 1994; Tampa Bay Lightning
- Playing career: 1997–2015

Bryce Chadwick Salvador (born February 11, 1976) is a Canadian former professional ice hockey defenceman. Salvador was drafted in the sixth round, 138th overall by the Tampa Bay Lightning in the 1994 NHL entry draft. During his professional career, he played for the St. Louis Blues and the New Jersey Devils.

Salvador is of African and Brazilian descent on his father's side, and Ukrainian on his mother's side.

== Playing career ==
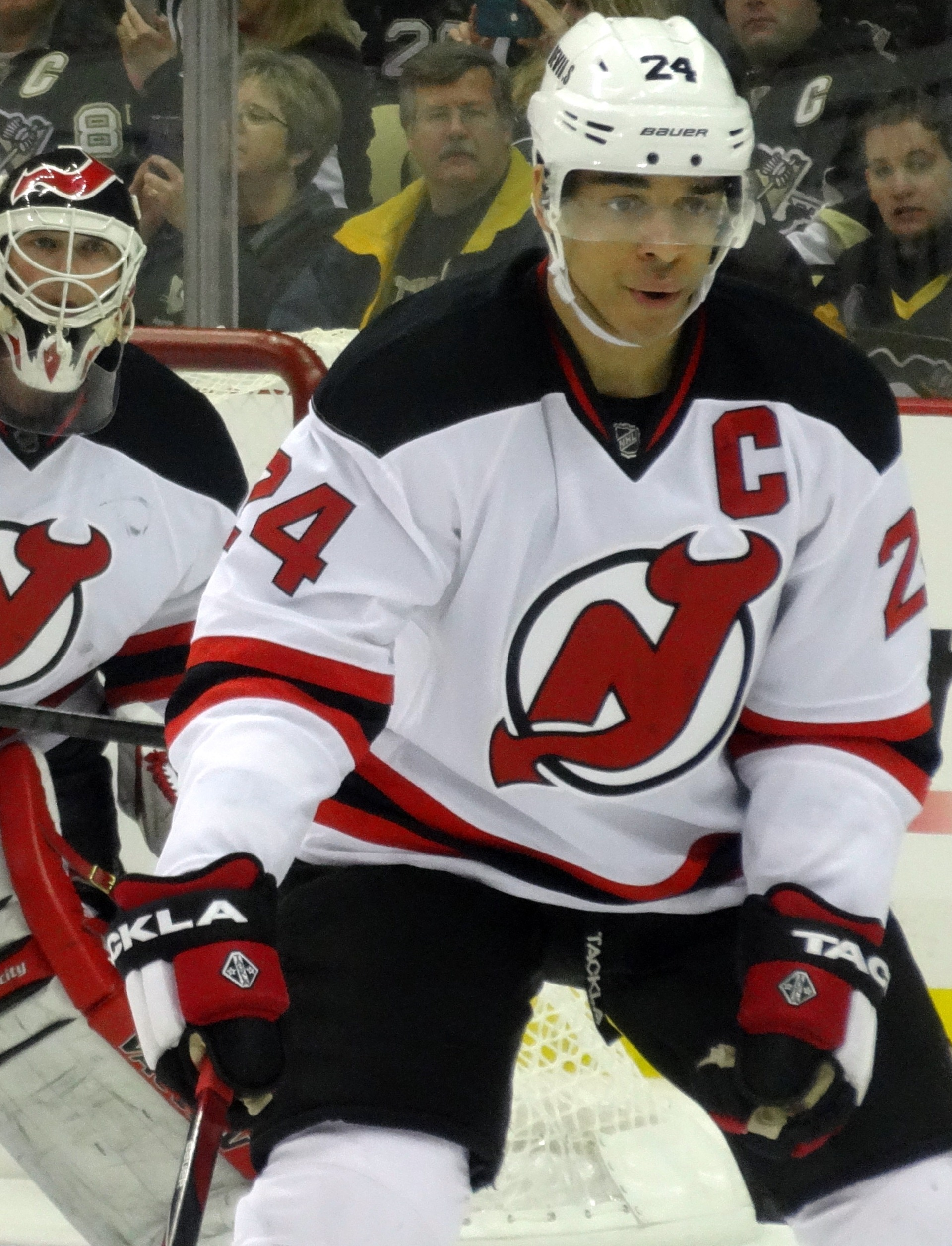
Salvador in 2013.

Salvador entered the NHL with a reputation as a gritty defenceman and engaged in three fights in his first 15 games. While in St. Louis, Salvador created a program with teammate Jamal Mayers called Jam 'n Sal's Community Stars, which recognizes kids who perform small acts of kindness and generosity. Salvador was traded from the St. Louis Blues to the Devils in exchange for Cam Janssen on February 26, 2008. On July 1, Salvador re-signed with the Devils to a four-year deal worth $11.6 million.

On July 3, 2012, Salvador was re-signed to a three-year contract by the Devils.

On January 17, 2013, due to his leadership in the locker room and somewhat lengthy tenure on the roster, he was named the 10th captain in the New Jersey Devils history, and the third black captain in NHL history, behind Dirk Graham and Jarome Iginla. Due to lower back injuries, Salvador only played in 94 games after the start of the 2012–13 season.

On September 2, 2015, Salvador announced his retirement after playing for 14 seasons.

== Broadcasting career ==
Since 2017, Salvador has been the television studio analyst and rinkside reporter for all Devils home games on MSG Sportsnet.

Salvador has worked as an ice level analyst for the Stanley Cup Playoffs on TNT since 2022.

== Career statistics ==
			Regular season					Playoffs
Season	Team	League	GP	G	A	Pts	PIM	GP	G	A	Pts	PIM
1992–93	Lethbridge Hurricanes	WHL	64	1	4	5	29	4	0	0	0	0
1993–94	Lethbridge Hurricanes	WHL	61	4	14	18	36	9	0	1	1	2
1994–95	Lethbridge Hurricanes	WHL	67	1	9	10	88	—	—	—	—	—
1995–96	Lethbridge Hurricanes	WHL	56	4	12	16	75	3	0	1	1	2
1996–97	Lethbridge Hurricanes	WHL	63	8	32	40	81	19	0	7	7	14
1997–98	Worcester IceCats	AHL	46	2	8	10	74	11	0	1	1	45
1998–99	Worcester IceCats	AHL	69	5	13	18	129	4	0	1	1	2
1999–2000	Worcester IceCats	AHL	56	0	13	13	53	9	0	1	1	2
2000–01	St. Louis Blues	NHL	75	2	8	10	69	14	2	0	2	18
2001–02	St. Louis Blues	NHL	66	5	7	12	78	10	0	1	1	4
2002–03	St. Louis Blues	NHL	71	2	8	10	95	7	0	0	0	2
2003–04	St. Louis Blues	NHL	69	3	5	8	47	5	0	0	0	2
2003–04	Worcester IceCats	AHL	2	0	1	1	0	—	—	—	—	—
2004–05	Missouri River Otters	UHL	7	0	0	0	16	—	—	—	—	—
2005–06	St. Louis Blues	NHL	46	1	4	5	26	—	—	—	—	—
2006–07	St. Louis Blues	NHL	64	2	5	7	55	—	—	—	—	—
2007–08	St. Louis Blues	NHL	56	1	10	11	43	—	—	—	—	—
2007–08	New Jersey Devils	NHL	8	0	0	0	11	5	1	0	1	2
2008–09	New Jersey Devils	NHL	76	3	13	16	78	4	0	0	0	4
2009–10	New Jersey Devils	NHL	79	4	10	14	57	5	0	0	0	6
2011–12	New Jersey Devils	NHL	82	0	9	9	66	24	4	10	14	26
2012–13	New Jersey Devils	NHL	39	0	2	2	22	—	—	—	—	—
2013–14	New Jersey Devils	NHL	40	1	3	4	29	—	—	—	—	—
2014–15	New Jersey Devils	NHL	15	0	2	2	20	—	—	—	—	—
NHL totals			786	24	86	110	696	74	7	11	18	64

== See also ==
- List of black NHL players

Awards and achievements
Preceded by Zach Parise	New Jersey Devils captain 2013–15	Succeeded by Andy Greene
