= D. J. King =

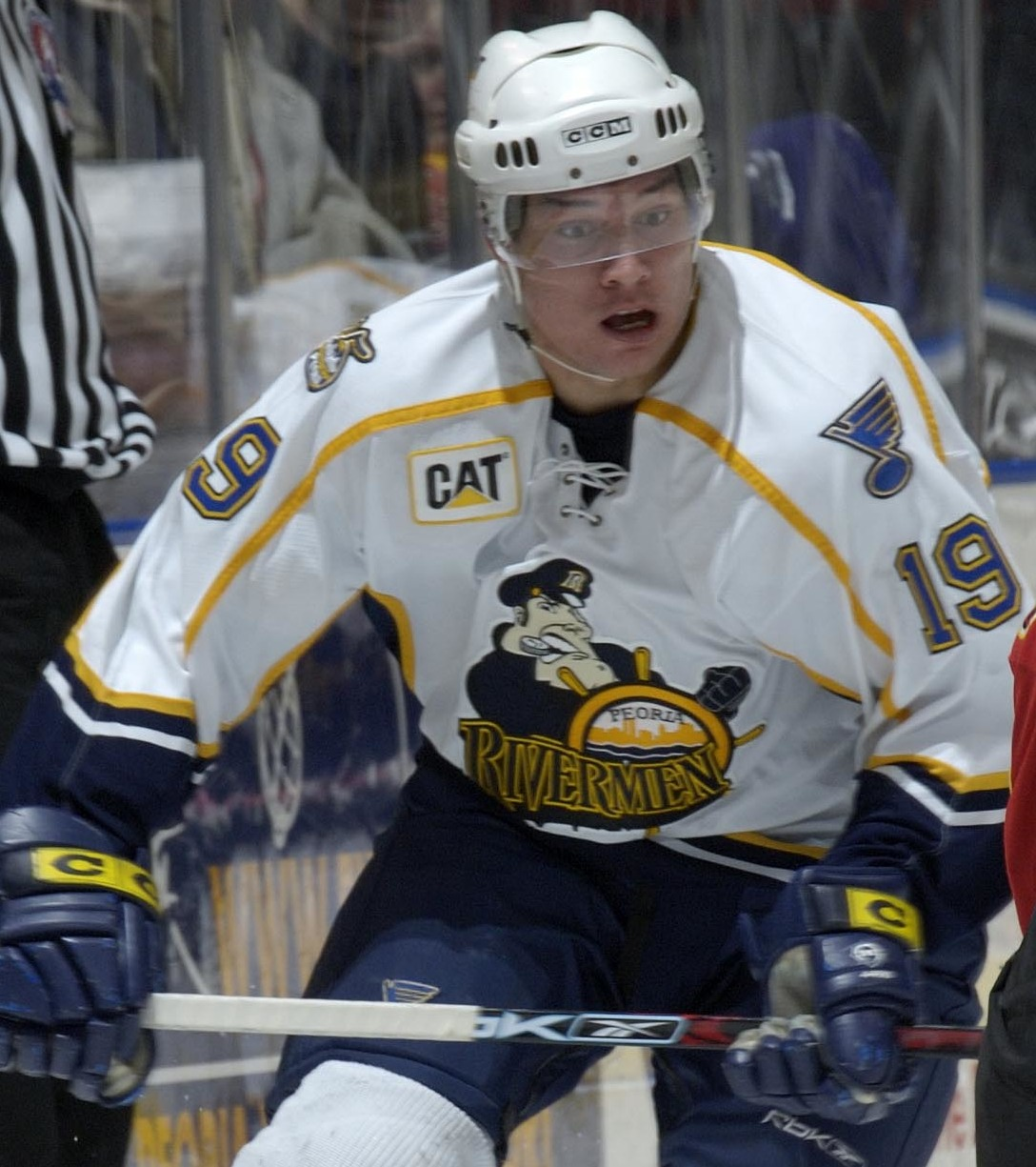
- King with the Peoria Rivermen in 2007
- Born: June 27, 1984 (age 42) Meadow Lake, Saskatchewan, Canada
- Height: 6 ft 3 in (191 cm)
- Weight: 230 lb (104 kg; 16 st 6 lb)
- Position: Left wing
- Shot: Left
- Played for: St. Louis Blues; Washington Capitals
- NHL draft: 190th overall, 2002; St. Louis Blues
- Playing career: 2004–2013

Dwayne "D. J." King Jr. (born June 27, 1984) is a Canadian former professional ice hockey left winger who played in the National Hockey League (NHL) with the St. Louis Blues and the Washington Capitals.

== Playing career ==
He was drafted in the 6th round of the 2002 NHL entry draft, 191st overall, by the St. Louis Blues. As a junior from the Western Hockey League's, Lethbridge Hurricanes and Kelowna Rockets, King, known as an enforcer, spent his first two professional seasons within the Blues organization with affiliates in the American Hockey League and ECHL.

He made his NHL debut in the 2006–07 season on October 5, 2006, against the San Jose Sharks. King was then reassigned to play a majority of the year with AHL affiliate, the Peoria Rivermen. As first recall with the Blues and after being held scoreless in his first 24 NHL games, King scored his first career goal against Curtis Joseph in a 5–2 victory of the Phoenix Coyotes on April 4, 2007. He finished with 27 games for the Blues during the season, registering two points (one goal, one assist) along with 52 penalty minutes.

King's 2008–09 season was ruined by a season-ending shoulder injury, playing only one game for the Blues. He returned for the 2009–10 season, easily defeating Krys Barch in his first game of the season. However, King broke an already-damaged finger on his hand in the fight, sidelining him for several months. King's found himself bouncing back between the AHL and NHL throughout his career.

On July 28, 2010, King was re-signed to a two-year contract extension with the Blues in order to facilitate a trade to the Washington Capitals for Stefan Della Rovere.

A free agent during the 2012–13 season, King was signed to a contract with the minor league team, the Ontario Reign of the ECHL on February 20, 2013.

Throughout King's career he was a known fighter, through his junior hockey days up to the NHL. Some of his most notable fight came against Dion Phaneuf in the WHL, Colton Orr, and Derek Boogaard.

== Personal life ==
King is of Métis heritage. His younger brother Dwight also plays professional hockey, currently playing for Avtomobilist Yekaterinburg of the Kontinental Hockey League (KHL). He and his long time girlfriend Chantal Babin have 2 boys together. In 2015, King, James Norman, and Jeremy Norman became owners of Tawaw Cabins, a resort located in Waterhen Lake, Saskatchewan. In 2025, King debuted at the Rangeland Derby at Calgary Stampede as a chuckwagon driver. He now drives full time in the WPCA

== Career statistics ==
			Regular season					Playoffs
Season	Team	League	GP	G	A	Pts	PIM	GP	G	A	Pts	PIM
2000–01	Beardy's Blackhawks AAA	SMHL	52	30	28	58	120	—	—	—	—	—
2001–02	Lethbridge Hurricanes	WHL	65	10	14	24	104	4	1	0	1	2
2002–03	Lethbridge Hurricanes	WHL	55	15	17	32	139	—	—	—	—	—
2003–04	Lethbridge Hurricanes	WHL	35	8	15	23	102	—	—	—	—	—
2003–04	Kelowna Rockets	WHL	28	5	2	7	80	17	1	6	7	16
2004–05	Worcester IceCats	AHL	74	6	8	14	178	—	—	—	—	—
2005–06	Peoria Rivermen	AHL	67	5	6	11	160	2	0	0	0	2
2005–06	Alaska Aces	ECHL	5	0	4	4	4	—	—	—	—	—
2006–07	St. Louis Blues	NHL	27	1	1	2	52	—	—	—	—	—
2006–07	Peoria Rivermen	AHL	38	5	4	9	102	—	—	—	—	—
2007–08	St. Louis Blues	NHL	61	3	3	6	100	—	—	—	—	—
2008–09	St. Louis Blues	NHL	1	0	1	1	0	—	—	—	—	—
2009–10	St. Louis Blues	NHL	12	0	0	0	33	—	—	—	—	—
2009–10	Peoria Rivermen	AHL	10	0	1	1	13	—	—	—	—	—
2010–11	Washington Capitals	NHL	16	0	2	2	30	—	—	—	—	—
2011–12	Washington Capitals	NHL	1	0	0	0	0	—	—	—	—	—
2011–12	Hershey Bears	AHL	29	0	4	4	13	4	1	0	1	0
2012–13	Ontario Reign	ECHL	19	5	3	8	22	10	1	2	3	8
2012–13	Meadow Lake Stampeders	NSRHL	18	13	19	32	20	2	0	3	3	6
2013–14	Meadow Lake Stampeders	NSRHL	21	18	19	37	22	4	3	1	4	8
2014–15	Meadow Lake Stampeders	NSRHL	15	19	24	43	0	8	2	8	10	16
2015–16	Meadow Lake Broncos	BLHL	2	2	0	2	2	6	3	4	7	0
2016–17	Meadow Lake Broncos	BLHL	3	3	4	7	0	2	0	3	3	2
2018–19	Meadow Lake Broncos	SASHL	7	6	7	13	2	10	3	9	12	21
2019–20	Meadow Lake Broncos	SASHL	9	3	3	6	6	10	2	4	6	10
2021–22	Meadow Lake Broncos	SASHL	9	1	4	5	8	3	0	0	0	2
2022–23	Meadow Lake Broncos	SASHL	7	6	8	14	4	11	1	6	7	26
AHL totals			218	16	23	39	466	6	1	0	1	2
NHL totals			118	4	7	11	215	—	—	—	—	—
