= T. J. Fast =

Canadian ice hockey player (born 1987)

- Born: September 2, 1987 (age 38) Calgary, Alberta, Canada
- Height: 6 ft 1 in (185 cm)
- Weight: 190 lb (86 kg; 13 st 8 lb)
- Position: Defence
- Shot: Left
- Played for: Peoria Rivermen; Rochester Americans; Connecticut Whale; Hamilton Bulldogs; Eispiraten Crimmitschau; Heilbronner Falken
- NHL draft: 60th overall, 2005; Los Angeles Kings
- Playing career: 2008–2015

T. J. Fast (born September 2, 1987) is a Canadian former professional ice hockey defenceman who last played with Heilbronner Falken of the German DEL2.

== Playing career ==
Fast began his junior career in the Alberta Junior Hockey League (AJHL) for two seasons playing for the Calgary Royals and Camrose Kodiaks. After his second AJHL season in 2004–05, he was drafted in the 2005 NHL entry draft by the Los Angeles Kings as the 60th overall pick in the second round. He subsequently joined the college hockey ranks with the University of Denver. However, after one-and-a-half seasons with Denver, he moved to major junior to play for the Tri-City Americans of the Western Hockey League (WHL). In 2007–08, Fast recorded a 17-goal, 54-point season to earn WHL West First Team All-Star honours.

Following his final junior season, he was traded by the Kings to the St. Louis Blues on June 4, 2008, in exchange for a fifth round draft pick in 2009.

On August 3, 2010, Fast was traded to the Florida Panthers in exchange for Graham Mink.

To start the 2011–12 season, Fast was signed by the Greenville Road Warriors. Before he made his debut with the Warriors he was loaned to the Connecticut Whale and appeared in one game. After he was returned to the Road Warriors he was immediately loaned again to the AHL with the Hamilton Bulldogs. On December 16, 2011, Fast was signed for the remainder of the season by the Bulldogs.

In the midway point of the following season, without ever debuting with Greenville, Fast's rights were traded by the Road Warriors to the Bakersfield Condors for Zach Cohen on January 9, 2013. Fast was eventually signed to a contract and appeared in 17 games for the Condors in the 2012-13 season.

On July 4, 2013, Fast signed as a free agent to his first European contract on a one-year deal with German club, ETC Crimmitschau of the DEL2.

== Career statistics ==
			Regular season					Playoffs
Season	Team	League	GP	G	A	Pts	PIM	GP	G	A	Pts	PIM
2003–04	Calgary Northstars AAA	AMHL	31	7	7	14	42	—	—	—	—	—
2003–04	Calgary Royals	AJHL	10	0	2	2	0	—	—	—	—	—
2004–05	Camrose Kodiaks	AJHL	58	8	28	36	40	—	—	—	—	—
2005–06	University of Denver	WCHA	39	1	6	7	26	—	—	—	—	—
2006–07	University of Denver	WCHA	19	0	4	4	14	—	—	—	—	—
2006–07	Tri–City Americans	WHL	26	3	19	22	30	6	0	1	1	14
2007–08	Tri–City Americans	WHL	71	17	37	54	92	16	1	8	9	16
2008–09	Peoria Rivermen	AHL	46	1	4	5	12	—	—	—	—	—
2008–09	Alaska Aces	ECHL	9	0	1	1	6	18	0	5	5	11
2009–10	Alaska Aces	ECHL	46	10	21	31	26	4	2	1	3	0
2009–10	Peoria Rivermen	AHL	18	0	1	1	4	—	—	—	—	—
2010–11	Cincinnati Cyclones	ECHL	58	9	18	27	36	—	—	—	—	—
2010–11	Rochester Americans	AHL	13	1	1	2	12	—	—	—	—	—
2011–12	Connecticut Whale	AHL	1	0	0	0	2	—	—	—	—	—
2011–12	Hamilton Bulldogs	AHL	42	1	4	5	34	—	—	—	—	—
2012–13	Bakersfield Condors	ECHL	17	0	1	1	6	—	—	—	—	—
2013–14	Eispiraten Crimmitschau	DEL2	49	9	25	34	24	—	—	—	—	—
2014–15	Heilbronner Falken	DEL2	36	2	13	15	49	—	—	—	—	—
AHL totals			120	3	9	12	64	—	—	—	—	—
ECHL totals			130	19	41	60	74	22	2	6	8	11

== Awards and honours ==
Award	Year
Western Hockey League
West First All-Star Team	2007–08
