= Barret Jackman =

Canadian ice hockey player (born 1981)

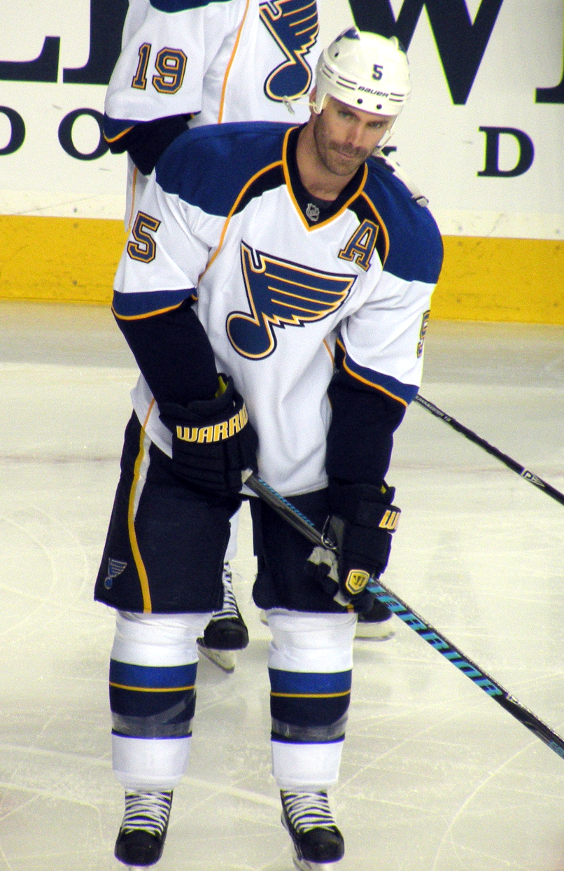
- Jackman with the St. Louis Blues in 2013
- Born: March 5, 1981 (age 45) Trail, British Columbia, Canada
- Height: 6 ft 0 in (183 cm)
- Weight: 205 lb (93 kg; 14 st 9 lb)
- Position: Defence
- Shot: Left
- Played for: St. Louis Blues; Nashville Predators
- National team: Canada
- NHL draft: 17th overall, 1999; St. Louis Blues
- Playing career: 2001–2016
Medal record
Representing Canada
Men's ice hockey
World Championships
Gold medal – first place	2007 Moscow
World Junior Championships
Bronze medal – third place	2001 Moscow
Bronze medal – third place	2000 Skelleftea

Barret D. Jackman (born March 5, 1981) is a Canadian former professional ice hockey defenceman who played in the National Hockey League (NHL) with the St. Louis Blues and the Nashville Predators. Jackman was selected 17th overall in the 1999 NHL entry draft by the St. Louis Blues. Jackman was born in Trail, British Columbia and grew up in Salmo, British Columbia & later Fruitvale, British Columbia. Jackman was often known for his physical style of play and fighting abilities.

== Playing career ==
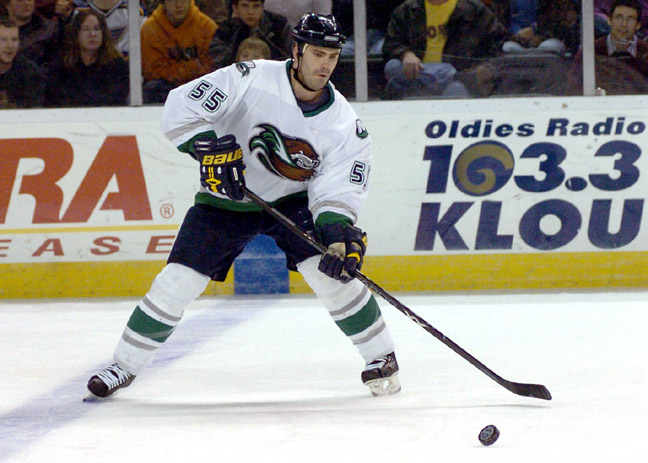
Jackman played with the Missouri River Otters during the 2004–05 lock-out

Jackman first started playing Junior "A" and "B" with his hometown's Trail Smoke Eaters and the Beaver Valley Nitehawks in the 1996-97 season. With the Nitehawks, he captured the KIJHL Championship along with winning the Cyclone Taylor Cup; the British Columbia Junior "B" Championships in his first and only season in juniors.

The following year he was named the youngest captain ever in the history of the Regina Pats in the Western Hockey League and played four seasons there, with 796 penalty-in-minutes (PIM) in 234 regular WHL season games played.

After playing junior and major junior hockey for five years, he was drafted in the first round, 17th overall, in the 1999 NHL entry draft at the FleetCenter in Boston by the St. Louis Blues.

In the 2002–03 NHL season he finished with a plus-23 rating and was among the leaders for NHL rookies in average ice time per game. Jackman won the Calder Memorial Trophy (Rookie of the Year) in 2003, narrowly beating out the Detroit Red Wings' Henrik Zetterberg and the Columbus Blue Jackets' Rick Nash.

He was sidelined by a chronic dislocated shoulder during much of the 2003–04 season, and thus played in only 15 games that season; a somewhat disappointing follow-up to his stellar rookie year.

When the NHL was locked out Jackman stayed in St. Louis and played for the Missouri River Otters. He returned to the Blues for the 2005–06 season. For the 2006–07 season Jackman set career highs in assists and points. He was a member of the 2007 Canadian IIHF World Championship team that won gold in a 4–2 win against Finland in Moscow, Russia.

On June 18, 2012, Jackman was re-signed by the Blues to a three-year contract extension.

On June 11, 2015, Jackman was informed by the Blues that his association with the club after 16 years would end, releasing him to free agency. On July 1, 2015, Jackman signed with Central Division rivals the Nashville Predators on a two-year contract, worth an average of $2 million per season. In the 2015–16 season with the Predators, Jackman was a staple on the blueline, adding 5 points in 74 contests. He appeared in all 14 post-season games before the Predators were eliminated in the Conference Semi-Finals by the San Jose Sharks. After only one year in Nashville, on June 30, 2016, Jackman was placed on unconditional waivers for the purpose of buying out the final year of his contract.

Jackman officially retired on October 4, 2016, after signing a one-day contract with St. Louis to retire as a member of the Blues.

== Personal life ==
Jackman married Jenny Jackman in July 2007. They have two children together. Jackman's childhood home was used for filming in the Canadian television series Road Hockey Rumble.

== Career statistics ==
=== Regular season and playoffs ===
			Regular season					Playoffs
Season	Team	League	GP	G	A	Pts	PIM	GP	G	A	Pts	PIM
1996–97	Beaver Valley Nitehawks	KIJHL	32	22	25	47	180	—	—	—	—	—
1996–97	Trail Smoke Eaters	BCHL	10	1	1	2	6	—	—	—	—	—
1997–98	Regina Pats	WHL	68	2	11	13	224	9	0	3	3	32
1998–99	Regina Pats	WHL	70	8	36	44	259	—	—	—	—	—
1999–00	Regina Pats	WHL	53	9	37	46	175	6	1	1	2	19
1999–00	Worcester IceCats	AHL	—	—	—	—	—	2	0	0	0	13
2000–01	Regina Pats	WHL	43	9	27	36	138	6	0	3	3	8
2001–02	St. Louis Blues	NHL	1	0	0	0	0	1	0	0	0	2
2001–02	Worcester IceCats	AHL	75	2	12	14	266	3	0	1	1	4
2002–03	St. Louis Blues	NHL	82	3	16	19	190	7	0	0	0	14
2003–04	St. Louis Blues	NHL	15	1	2	3	41	—	—	—	—	—
2004–05	Missouri River Otters	UHL	28	3	17	20	61	3	0	0	0	4
2005–06	St. Louis Blues	NHL	63	4	6	10	156	—	—	—	—	—
2006–07	St. Louis Blues	NHL	70	3	24	27	82	—	—	—	—	—
2006–07	Peoria Rivermen	AHL	1	0	0	0	0	—	—	—	—	—
2007–08	St. Louis Blues	NHL	78	2	14	16	93	—	—	—	—	—
2008–09	St. Louis Blues	NHL	82	4	17	21	86	4	0	1	1	5
2009–10	St. Louis Blues	NHL	66	2	15	17	81	—	—	—	—	—
2010–11	St. Louis Blues	NHL	60	0	13	13	57	—	—	—	—	—
2011–12	St. Louis Blues	NHL	81	1	12	13	57	9	0	1	1	21
2012–13	St. Louis Blues	NHL	46	3	9	12	39	6	1	1	2	10
2013–14	St. Louis Blues	NHL	79	3	12	15	97	6	1	2	3	6
2014–15	St. Louis Blues	NHL	80	2	13	15	47	6	0	0	0	4
2015–16	Nashville Predators	NHL	73	1	4	5	76	14	0	0	0	22
NHL totals			876	29	157	186	1102	53	2	5	7	84

=== International ===
Year	Team	Event	Result	GP	G	A	Pts	PIM
2000	Canada	WJC	3rd place, bronze medalist(s)	7	0	1	1	8
2001	Canada	WJC	3rd place, bronze medalist(s)	7	0	3	3	10
2007	Canada	WC	1st place, gold medalist(s)	9	0	2	2	6
Junior totals				14	0	4	4	18
Senior totals				9	0	2	2	6

== Awards and honours ==
Award	Year
WHL
East Second All-Star Team	2000
NHL
All-Rookie Team	2003
Calder Memorial Trophy	2003

Awards and achievements
Preceded by Christian Backman	St. Louis Blues first-round draft pick 1999	Succeeded by Jeff Taffe
Preceded by Dany Heatley	Winner of the Calder Memorial Trophy; 2003	Succeeded by Andrew Raycroft
