= Cam Janssen =

American ice hockey player

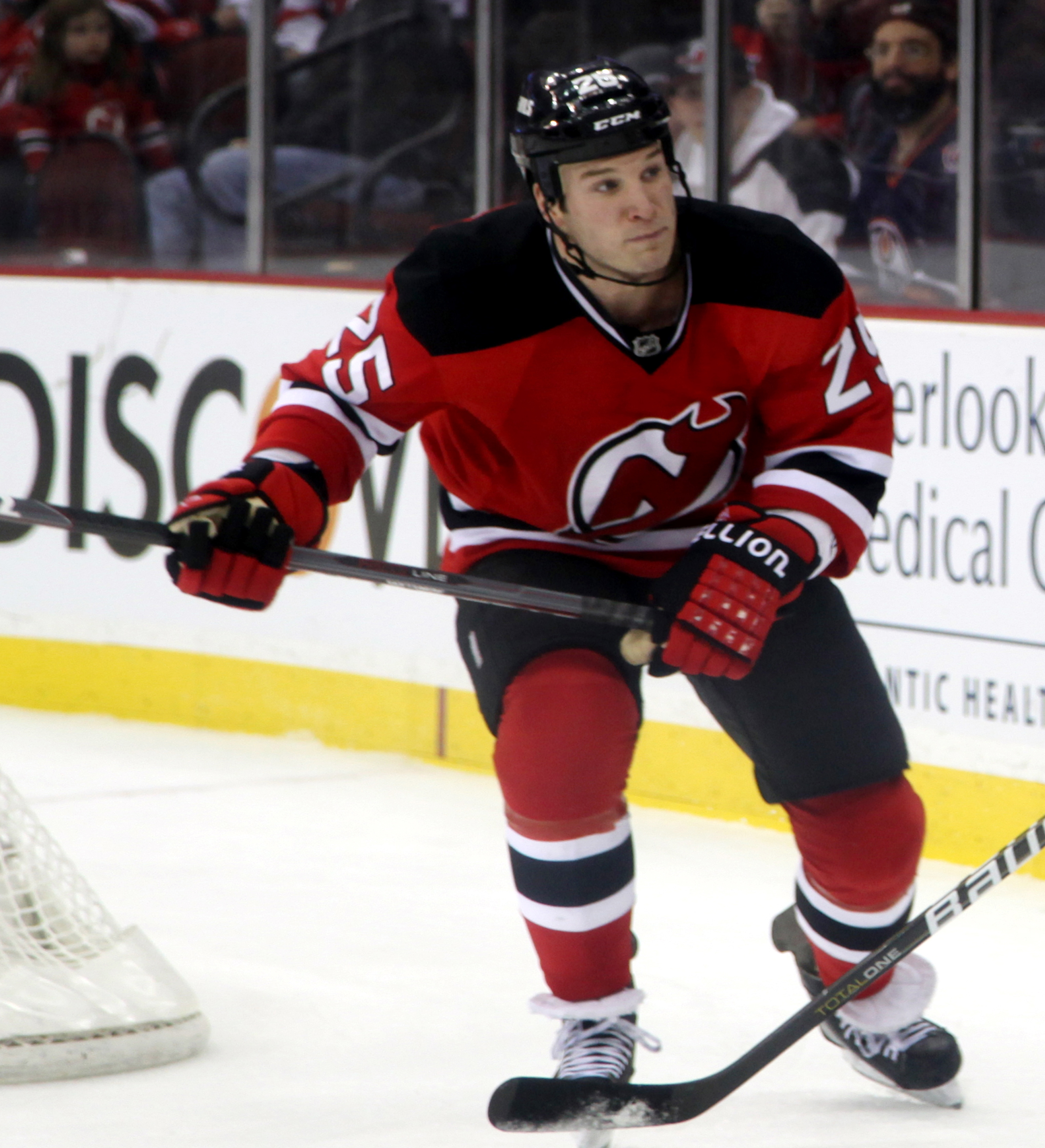
- Janssen with the New Jersey Devils in 2012
- Born: April 15, 1984 (age 42) St. Louis, Missouri, U.S.
- Height: 6 ft 0 in (183 cm)
- Weight: 215 lb (98 kg; 15 st 5 lb)
- Position: Right Wing
- Shot: Right
- Played for: New Jersey Devils; St. Louis Blues; Nottingham Panthers
- NHL draft: 117th overall, 2002; New Jersey Devils
- Playing career: 2004–2016

Cameron Wesley Janssen (born April 15, 1984) is an American former professional ice hockey player who played in the National Hockey League (NHL) with the New Jersey Devils and St. Louis Blues. He was selected by the New Jersey Devils 117th overall in the fourth round of the 2002 NHL entry draft. Janssen was widely regarded as one of the toughest enforcers in the league throughout his low-scoring tenure.

== Early life ==
Janssen grew up in the St. Louis suburb of Eureka, Missouri, where he attended Eureka High School for three years. During his sophomore and junior years of high school, Janssen played for the St. Louis Sting of the Junior A North American Hockey League.

== Playing career ==
In 2001, Janssen was selected in the third round of the Ontario Hockey League draft by the Windsor Spitfires. Instead of completing his senior year at Eureka High School, Janssen moved to Windsor, Ontario to begin his first season with the Spitfires. After one season in Ontario, Janssen was drafted by the New Jersey Devils as the 117th overall pick during the fourth round 2002 NHL entry draft. During the 2003–04 OHL season, Janssen joined the Guelph Storm, where he participated in the Memorial Cup tournament.

Jansen made his NHL debut against the Rangers on November 5, 2005. In his rookie NHL season, Janssen led the Devils with eleven fighting majors. On February 24, 2007, he scored his first career NHL goal and point against the Washington Capitals at 10:33 in the second period in his 82nd NHL game, an NHL record for most games played by a skater before recording their first career NHL point.

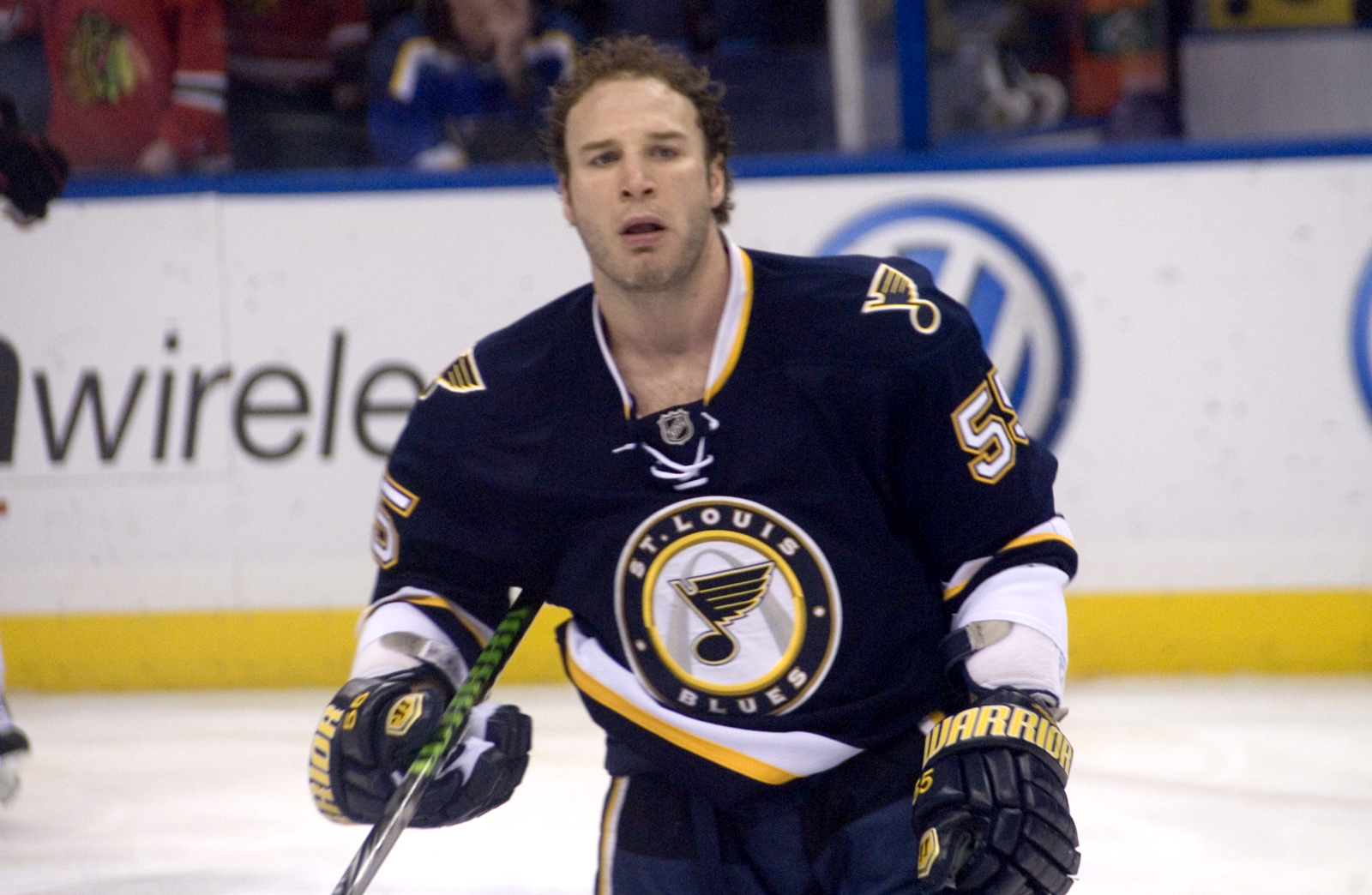
Janssen in February 2011 with the Blues.

In the second period of a regular season game against the Toronto Maple Leafs on March 2, 2007, Janssen knocked-out Toronto defenseman Tomáš Kaberle unconscious with a late hit to the head. Kaberle was carried off the ice on a stretcher. The NHL announced Janssen would be suspended for three games without pay for the incident, forfeiting $7,220.16. In an interview, Kaberle mentioned Janssen had not contacted him for reconciliation, and went on to say, "I don't care [to hear from him]. He doesn't respect me and I don't respect him."

On March 30, 2007, Janssen injured his shoulder in a fight with Riley Cote of the Philadelphia Flyers and missed 4 games. He returned for the playoffs against the Tampa Bay Lightning. Janssen was injured in the 2007 NHL preseason as well, suffering an injury in a fight with Jesse Boulerice.

On February 26, 2008, Janssen was traded by the Devils to his hometown team, the St. Louis Blues, for defenseman Bryce Salvador. He made his Blues' debut two days later, wearing #55 against the Phoenix Coyotes.

A free agent after his contract with the Blues expired in 2011, Janssen signed a one-year, two-way contract to return to the Devils on July 14, 2011 becoming the 22nd player to be re-acquired and play for the team.

Janssen signed as a free agent on a one-year contract with the Nottingham Panthers of the EIHL on August 15, 2015. He announced the end of his professional career at the conclusion of the season on August 12, 2016.

== Career statistics ==
			Regular season					Playoffs
Season	Team	League	GP	G	A	Pts	PIM	GP	G	A	Pts	PIM
2000–01	St. Louis Sting	NAHL	45	1	2	3	244	—	—	—	—	—
2001–02	Windsor Spitfires	OHL	64	5	17	22	268	10	0	0	0	13
2002–03	Windsor Spitfires	OHL	50	1	12	13	211	7	0	1	1	22
2003–04	Windsor Spitfires	OHL	35	4	9	13	144	—	—	—	—	—
2004–05	Albany River Rats	AHL	70	1	3	4	337	—	—	—	—	—
2005–06	Albany River Rats	AHL	26	1	3	4	117	—	—	—	—	—
2005–06	New Jersey Devils	NHL	47	0	0	0	91	9	0	0	0	26
2006–07	New Jersey Devils	NHL	48	1	0	1	114	—	—	—	—	—
2006–07	Lowell Devils	AHL	9	0	1	1	29	—	—	—	—	—
2007–08	Lowell Devils	AHL	3	0	0	0	4	—	—	—	—	—
2007–08	St. Louis Blues	NHL	12	0	1	1	18	—	—	—	—	—
2008–09	St. Louis Blues	NHL	56	1	3	4	131	1	0	0	0	0
2009–10	St. Louis Blues	NHL	43	0	0	0	190	—	—	—	—	—
2010–11	St. Louis Blues	NHL	54	1	3	4	131	—	—	—	—	—
2011–12	New Jersey Devils	NHL	48	0	1	1	75	—	—	—	—	—
2012–13	New Jersey Devils	NHL	4	0	0	0	2	—	—	—	—	—
2012–13	Albany Devils	AHL	36	1	4	5	65	—	—	—	—	—
2013–14	Albany Devils	AHL	27	0	3	3	24	—	—	—	—	—
2013–14	New Jersey Devils	NHL	24	3	0	3	22	—	—	—	—	—
2014–15	Albany Devils	AHL	34	1	1	2	81	—	—	—	—	—
2015–16	Nottingham Panthers	EIHL	51	3	5	8	98	4	1	0	1	2
AHL totals			205	4	15	19	657	—	—	—	—	—
NHL totals			336	6	8	14	774	10	0	0	0	26
