= Peoria Rivermen (AHL) =

- City: Peoria, Illinois
- League: American Hockey League
- Operated: 2005–2013
- Home arena: Carver Arena
- Colors: Royal blue, navy, gold, white
- Affiliates: St. Louis Blues (NHL) (2005–2013)

Franchise history
- 1932–1935: Quebec Beavers
- 1935–1951: Springfield Indians
- 1951–1954: Syracuse Warriors
- 1954–1967: Springfield Indians
- 1967–1974: Springfield Kings
- 1974–1994: Springfield Indians
- 1994–2005: Worcester IceCats
- 2005–2013: Peoria Rivermen
- 2013–2021: Utica Comets
- 2021–present: Abbotsford Canucks

The Peoria Rivermen were a professional ice hockey team in the American Hockey League. They played in Peoria, Illinois, at the Carver Arena. After the 2012–13 AHL season, the team relocated to Utica, New York, and became the Utica Comets.

== History ==
Two previous teams known as the Peoria Rivermen had existed prior to the AHL franchise's arrival in 2005: an IHL franchise that played from 1982 through 1996 before being sold and relocated to San Antonio; and an ECHL team that immediately replaced the IHL team. In 2005, the ECHL team folded to allow the Worcester IceCats to relocate to Peoria and take the Rivermen name.

In 2011, Dave Checketts announced that the St. Louis Blues, Scottrade Center, and the Peoria Rivermen were all for sale. On May 10, 2012, Tom Stillman purchased the Peoria Rivermen franchise. On August 30, the Rivermen signed a one-year affiliation agreement with the Evansville IceMen, an expansion team in the ECHL, cutting ties with the Alaska Aces, who they were affiliated with since the Rivermen joined the AHL.

On March 29, 2013, the Rivermen were purchased by the Vancouver Canucks. On April 18, 2013, the AHL approved the sale of the Peoria Rivermen to the Vancouver Canucks.

On May 13, 2013, the Vancouver Canucks confirmed with Peoria Civic Center officials that they would not bring back the Rivermen franchise and the AHL's Peoria Rivermen would no longer play in Peoria. The AHL announced on June 14, 2013, that the franchise was being relocated to Utica, New York, as the Utica Comets for the 2013–14 AHL season.

A Southern Professional Hockey League franchise replaced the AHL incarnation of the Rivermen in 2013 and took the team's name.

== Season-by-season results ==
Regular season											Playoffs				
Season	Games	Won	Lost	OTL	SOL	Points	PCT	Goals for	Goals against	Standing	Year	1st round	2nd round	3rd round	Finals
2005–06	80	46	26	3	5	100	.625	253	226	3rd, West	2006	L, 0–4, HOU	—	—	—
2006–07	80	37	33	2	8	84	.525	221	242	5th, West	2007	Did not qualify			
2007–08	80	38	33	4	5	85	.531	247	242	7th, West	2008	Did not qualify			
2008–09	80	43	31	2	4	92	.575	215	211	2nd, West	2009	L, 3–4, HOU	—	—	—
2009–10	80	38	33	2	7	85	.531	233	248	5th, West	2010	Did not qualify			
2010–11	80	42	30	3	5	92	.575	223	218	4th, West	2011	L, 0–4, HOU	—	—	—
2011–12	76	39	33	2	2	82	.539	217	207	4th, Midwest	2012	Did not qualify			
2012–13	76	33	35	5	3	74	.487	183	218	5th, Midwest	2013	Did not qualify			

== Players ==
=== Team captains ===
- Brendan Buckley, 2005–2006
- Aaron MacKenzie, 2006–2008
- Trent Whitfield, 2008–2009
- Yan Stastny, 2009–2010
- Dean Arsene, 2010–2011
- Adam Cracknell, 2011–2012
- Scott Ford, 2012–2013

== Coaches ==
- 2005–2006: Steve Pleau
- 2006–2008: Dave Baseggio
- 2008 – Jan 2, 2010: Davis Payne
- January 2, 2010 – April 2010: Rick Wamsley
- 2010–2012: Jared Bednar
- 2012–2013: Dave Allison
