= Joel Quenneville =

Canadian-American ice hockey coach (born 1958)

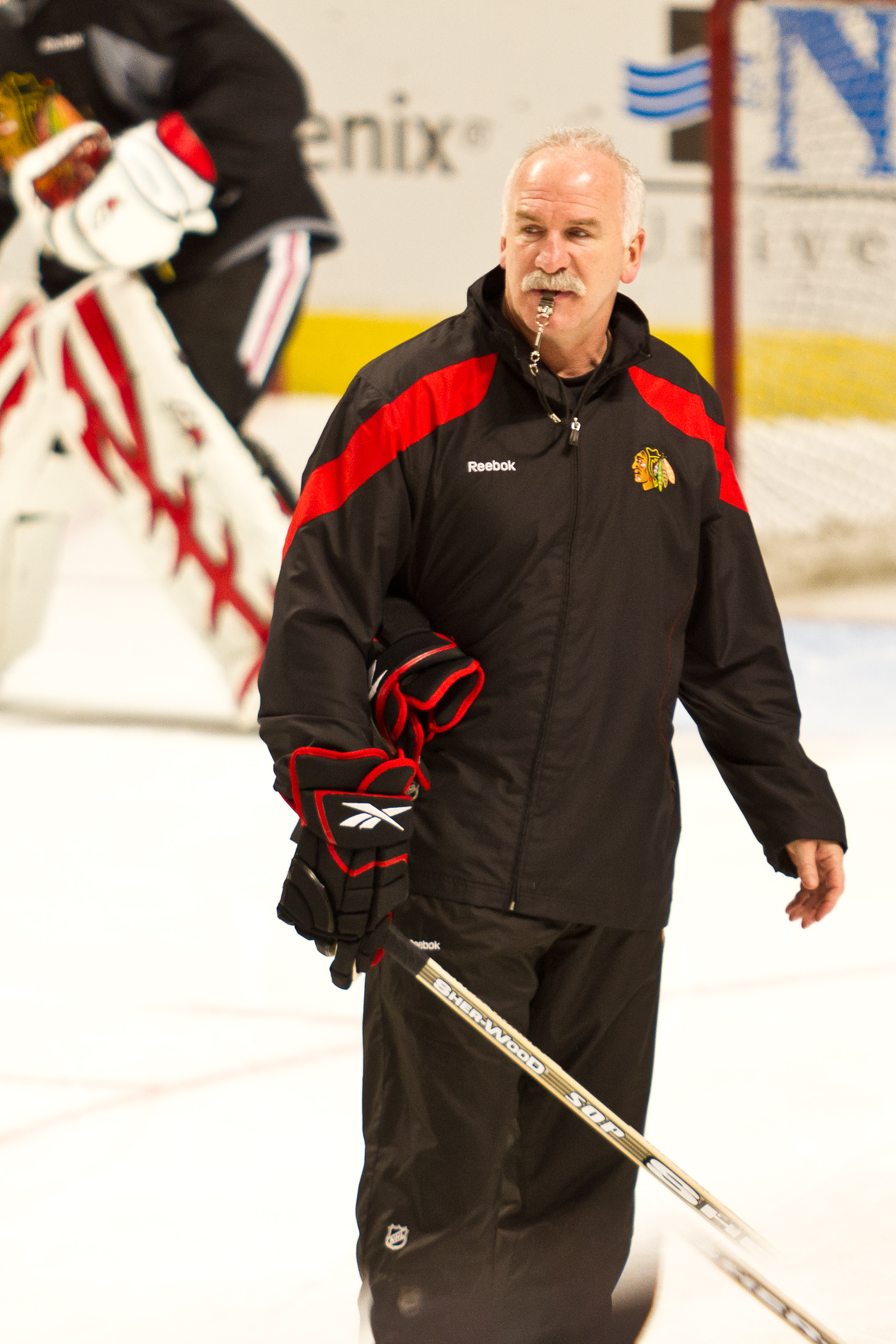
- Quenneville with the Chicago Blackhawks during a practice in December 2011
- Born: September 15, 1958 (age 68) Windsor, Ontario, Canada
- Height: 6 ft 1 in (185 cm)
- Weight: 200 lb (91 kg; 14 st 4 lb)
- Position: Defence
- Shot: Left
- Played for: Toronto Maple Leafs; Colorado Rockies; New Jersey Devils; Hartford Whalers; Washington Capitals
- Current NHL coach: Anaheim Ducks
- Coached for: St. Louis Blues; Colorado Avalanche; Chicago Blackhawks; Florida Panthers
- NHL draft: 21st overall, 1978; Toronto Maple Leafs
- Playing career: 1978–1992
- Coaching career: 1996–present

Joel Norman Quenneville (born September 15, 1958) is a Canadian-American professional ice hockey coach and former player who is the head coach for the Anaheim Ducks of the National Hockey League (NHL). Nicknamed "Coach Q", he is second in NHL coaching wins at 1,000 behind Scotty Bowman. Quenneville achieved his greatest success as head coach of the Chicago Blackhawks, a team he coached from 2008 to 2018. He led the Blackhawks to three Stanley Cup titles in 2010, 2013 and 2015. The team's championship victory in 2010 was the Blackhawks' first since 1961, ending the then-longest Stanley Cup drought.

Quenneville also served as the head coach of the St. Louis Blues from 1996 to 2004, the Colorado Avalanche from 2005 to 2008, and the Florida Panthers from 2019 to 2021.

== Playing career ==
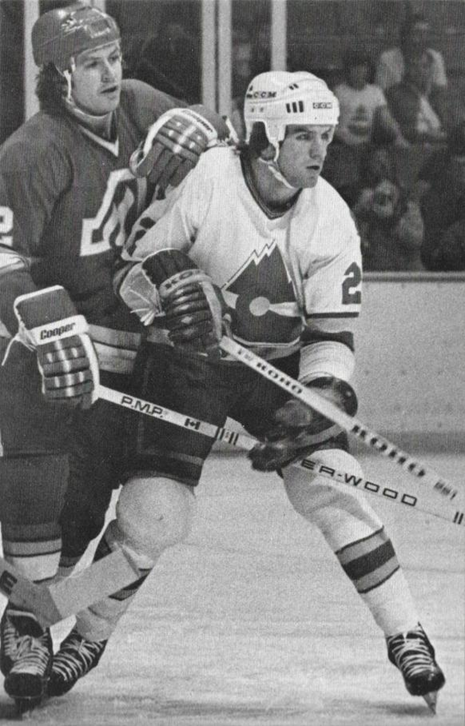
Quenneville with the Colorado Rockies in 1981.

As a player, Quenneville was drafted 21st overall by the Toronto Maple Leafs in the 1978 NHL entry draft. A defenceman, he played for the OHA's Windsor Spitfires, the New Brunswick Hawks, Baltimore Skipjacks and St. John's Maple Leafs of the American Hockey League (AHL), and the Maple Leafs, Colorado Rockies/New Jersey Devils, Hartford Whalers and Washington Capitals of the NHL. He has also been a player/assistant coach of St. John's, head coach of the AHL's Springfield Indians, and assistant coach of the Quebec Nordiques and Colorado Avalanche.

== Coaching career ==
=== Colorado Avalanche ===
Quenneville won the Stanley Cup as an assistant coach with the Avalanche in 1996.

=== St. Louis Blues ===
Quenneville then moved to the St. Louis Blues franchise, becoming head coach midway through the next season after Mike Keenan was fired. He led St. Louis to seven straight playoff berths. His best season was in 1999–2000, when he led the Blues to a franchise-record 51 wins and their first Presidents' Trophy for the league's best regular season record. However, they were upset in the playoffs, losing to the San Jose Sharks in the first round. He won the Jack Adams Award as the best coach of the regular season.

In the 2003-04 season with the Blues, the team started poorly and late in the year was in danger of missing the playoffs for the first time in a quarter century. As a result, on February 24, 2004, Quenneville was fired and replaced by his assistant Mike Kitchen. Quenneville left as the all-time winningest coach in franchise history with 307 wins, a mark he still holds.

=== Colorado Avalanche (2nd stint) ===
Quenneville was hired as head coach by Avalanche in June 2004, before the 2004–05 NHL lockout resulted in the season's cancellation. In his first year with the Avalanche, he led the team to the playoffs and a first round upset of the Dallas Stars. On March 25, 2007, Quenneville coached his 750th career game. He became one of only seven currently active coaches to reach 750 games as of the 2006–07 season. Quenneville coached his 400th win on October 26, 2007, a 3–2 overtime game against the Calgary Flames. On May 9, 2008, the Avalanche announced that Quenneville was leaving the organization in what was called a mutual parting of the ways.

=== Chicago Blackhawks ===
Quenneville was hired as a pro scout by the Chicago Blackhawks in September 2008.

On October 16, 2008, Quenneville was promoted to head coach of the Chicago Blackhawks, replacing former Blackhawk Denis Savard.

On December 1, 2009, he received his 500th win as a coach in an 11-round shootout battle against the Columbus Blue Jackets. In his first two seasons with Chicago, he led the team to the 2009 Western Conference finals and the 2010 Stanley Cup Final. With the Blackhawks' victory over the Philadelphia Flyers in the latter, Quenneville earned his first Stanley Cup as a head coach.

On October 7, 2010, in the 2010–11 season opener in a 4–3 OT loss against his former team, the Colorado Avalanche, becoming the second coach in history to coach 1,000 games and play 800 games as a player.

On December 18, 2011, he earned his 600th career coaching win, winning 4–2 against the Calgary Flames.

After the Blackhawks clinched the Presidents' Trophy in the lockout-shortened 2012–13 season, Quenneville earned his second championship as a head coach against the Boston Bruins during the 2013 Stanley Cup Final, cementing his status as one of a handful of Chicago head coaches with multiple championships (the others are Frank Chance of the Chicago Cubs, Rube Foster of the Chicago American Giants, George Halas of the Chicago Bears, Willy Roy of the Chicago Sting, and Phil Jackson of the Chicago Bulls).

On March 19, 2014, Quenneville became just the third head coach in NHL history to record 700 wins.

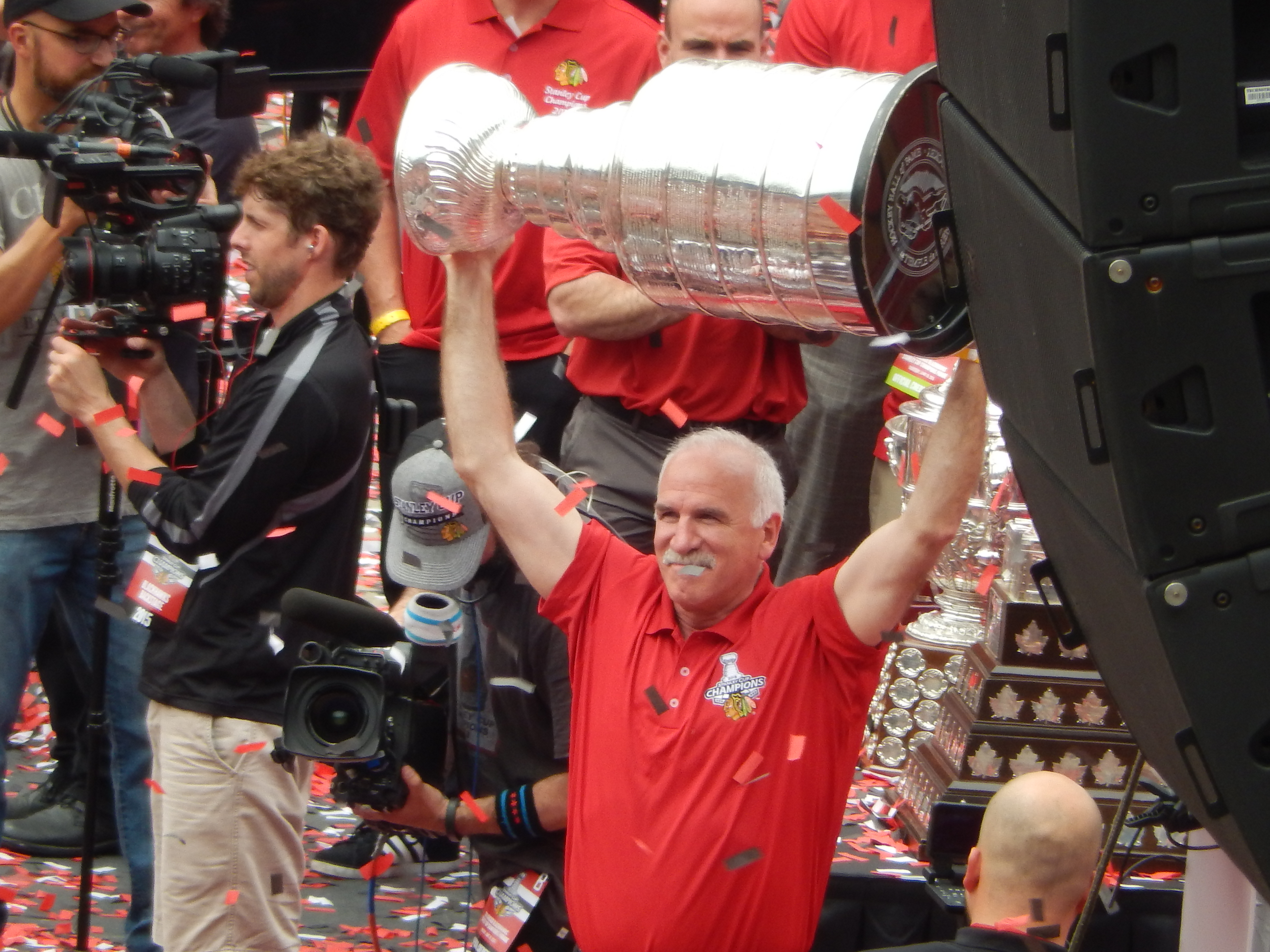
Quenneville with the Stanley Cup in June 2015.

On March 23, 2015, Quenneville reached 750 wins as a coach. His team won the Stanley Cup for the third time on June 15, 2015, with a 2–0 shutout over the Tampa Bay Lightning. This was the first Blackhawks' championship win on home ice since 1938. With his third win, Quenneville became the fourth coach in Chicago sports history to win three championships, after Foster, Halas and Jackson.

On January 14, 2016, Quenneville earned his 783rd win, passing Al Arbour for second all-time among NHL coaches. On April 3, 2016, Quenneville earned his 800th win, in a 6–4 victory over the Boston Bruins, and joined Scotty Bowman as the only two coaches with at least 800 wins.

On February 21, 2017, the Blackhawks defeated the Minnesota Wild 5–3, helping Quenneville become the second coach in Blackhawks history to win 400 games.

On February 21, 2018, Quenneville became the third coach in NHL history to coach 1,600 games as the Blackhawks won 3–2 over the Ottawa Senators. On March 10, Quenneville coached in his 1,608th regular season game and passed Arbour for second most on NHL all-time games coached list.

On November 6, 2018, the Blackhawks fired Quenneville after a 6–6–3 start in the 2018–19 season. He concluded his tenure in Chicago with a 452–249–96 regular season record, a 76–52 record in the postseason, and as the second winningest coach in NHL history with 890 wins. His 452 wins are second in Blackhawks history behind only Billy Reay, and only Reay had a longer unbroken tenure with the team.

=== Florida Panthers ===
On April 8, 2019, the Florida Panthers hired Quenneville as head coach. In his first season with the Panthers, Quenneville led the Panthers to a 35–26–8 record in the pandemic-shortened 2019–20 season and the Panthers' first playoff appearance in four seasons, losing to the New York Islanders in four games in the qualifying round.

In the 2021–22 season, Quenneville led the Panthers to a 7–0–0 record through the team's first seven games before his abrupt resignation on October 28, 2021, after being implicated in the 2010 Chicago Blackhawks sexual abuse scandal.

=== Anaheim Ducks ===
On May 8, 2025, the Anaheim Ducks hired Quenneville as the 12th head coach in team history.

On February 25, 2026, Quenneville became the second coach in NHL history to reach 1,000 regular season wins with a 6–5 victory over the Edmonton Oilers.

== Controversies ==
=== 2010 Brad Aldrich investigation ===
On October 26, 2021, an independent investigation into how the Blackhawks responded to claims that former video coach Brad Aldrich sexually assaulted prospect Kyle Beach during the 2010 Stanley Cup playoffs revealed that Quenneville, as well as several members of the Blackhawks' senior leadership team, opted to defer any action on Aldrich until after the Stanley Cup Final.

According to the report, Quenneville was particularly concerned about causing a distraction before the Stanley Cup Final. Three weeks after the allegations were raised, Aldrich was forced to resign by HR and Legal after opting not to comply with their investigation and subsequently pleaded guilty to assaulting a player at a Michigan high school where he was a volunteer coach.

Quenneville had previously claimed he had no knowledge that Aldrich sexually assaulted anyone before Beach and the high school player sued the Blackhawks, but multiple witnesses stated that he was called into a meeting to discuss the Aldrich matter shortly after the Blackhawks defeated the Sharks to advance to the 2010 Stanley Cup Final. Multiple people in the meeting claimed that the matter discussed did not directly involve sexual assault and then-CEO John McDonough in the meeting committed to getting more information and handling the matter while directing Quenneville and the rest of senior management to keep their focus on the upcoming Stanley Cup Final.

On October 27, 2021, Quenneville was summoned to a meeting the following day with NHL Commissioner Gary Bettman to discuss his role in the incident. Within hours of that meeting, Quenneville announced his immediate resignation as Panthers coach. He released a statement following his resignation "I want to express my sorrow for the pain this young man, Kyle Beach, has suffered. My former team – the Blackhawks – failed Kyle and I own my share of that. I want to reflect on how all this happened and take the time to educate myself on ensuring hockey spaces are safe for everyone." According to a formal NHL statement, Bettman, the Panthers, and Quenneville mutually agreed that "it was no longer appropriate" for Quenneville to stay on. Bettman also announced that Quenneville will have to meet with him before he is allowed to work in the NHL again.

On July 1, 2024, nearly three years after his abrupt resignation from the Panthers due to the Blackhawks scandal, Quenneville was reinstated by the NHL (along with Stan Bowman and Al MacIsaac) to seek future employment within the league.

== Personal life ==
Quenneville is of Franco-Ontarian heritage and is married to Elizabeth, a native of Connecticut whom he met during his stint with the Hartford Whalers. They reside in Hinsdale, Illinois with their three children: a son, Dylan, and two daughters, Lily and Anna. After working in the U.S. for over 30 years, Quenneville passed the USCIS naturalization test required to become a United States citizen on May 24, 2011, and now has dual citizenship.

Quenneville was hospitalized and reported as being "in stable condition after 'severe discomfort' of a non-cardiac nature" on February 16, 2011, resulting in him missing a home game versus the Minnesota Wild that night. After a conversation with the coach, Kelly Chase reported that Quenneville had suffered from internal bleeding, the cause of which was yet to be discovered, but that he was in high spirits and intended to be behind the bench for the Blackhawks next game on February 18. It was announced on February 18, that the problem had been a small ulcer caused by aspirin, a drug known to have the potential for gastrointestinal side effects. He finally returned to take the Blackhawks practice on February 23, having been released from the hospital on February 19.

Quenneville is a first cousin, once-removed, of Peter Quenneville, who was drafted 195th overall by the Columbus Blue Jackets in the 2013 NHL entry draft, John Quenneville, who was drafted 30th overall by the New Jersey Devils in the 2014 NHL entry draft and David Quenneville, who was drafted 200th overall by the New York Islanders in the 2016 NHL entry draft.

== Career statistics ==
=== Playing statistics ===
| | | | Regular season | | | | | Playoffs |
| Season | Team | League | GP | G | A | Pts | PIM | GP | G | A | Pts | PIM |
|---|---|---|---|---|---|---|---|---|---|---|---|---|
| 1975–76 | Windsor Spitfires | OMJHL | 66 | 15 | 33 | 48 | 61 | — | — | — | — | — |
| 1976–77 | Windsor Spitfires | OMJHL | 65 | 19 | 59 | 78 | 169 | 9 | 6 | 5 | 11 | 112 |
| 1977–78 | Windsor Spitfires | OMJHL | 66 | 27 | 76 | 103 | 114 | 6 | 2 | 3 | 5 | 17 |
| 1978–79 | New Brunswick Hawks | AHL | 16 | 1 | 10 | 11 | 10 | — | — | — | — | — |
| 1978–79 | Toronto Maple Leafs | NHL | 61 | 2 | 9 | 11 | 60 | 6 | 0 | 1 | 1 | 4 |
| 1979–80 | Toronto Maple Leafs | NHL | 32 | 1 | 4 | 5 | 24 | — | — | — | — | — |
| 1979–80 | Colorado Rockies | NHL | 35 | 5 | 7 | 12 | 26 | — | — | — | — | — |
| 1980–81 | Colorado Rockies | NHL | 71 | 10 | 24 | 34 | 86 | — | — | — | — | — |
| 1981–82 | Colorado Rockies | NHL | 64 | 5 | 10 | 15 | 55 | — | — | — | — | — |
| 1982–83 | New Jersey Devils | NHL | 74 | 5 | 12 | 17 | 46 | — | — | — | — | — |
| 1983–84 | Hartford Whalers | NHL | 80 | 5 | 8 | 13 | 95 | — | — | — | — | — |
| 1984–85 | Hartford Whalers | NHL | 79 | 6 | 16 | 22 | 96 | — | — | — | — | — |
| 1985–86 | Hartford Whalers | NHL | 71 | 5 | 20 | 25 | 83 | 10 | 0 | 2 | 2 | 12 |
| 1986–87 | Hartford Whalers | NHL | 37 | 3 | 7 | 10 | 24 | 6 | 0 | 0 | 0 | 0 |
| 1987–88 | Hartford Whalers | NHL | 77 | 1 | 8 | 9 | 44 | 6 | 0 | 2 | 2 | 2 |
| 1988–89 | Hartford Whalers | NHL | 69 | 4 | 7 | 11 | 32 | 4 | 0 | 3 | 3 | 4 |
| 1989–90 | Hartford Whalers | NHL | 44 | 1 | 4 | 5 | 34 | — | — | — | — | — |
| 1990–91 | Baltimore Skipjacks | AHL | 59 | 6 | 13 | 19 | 58 | 6 | 1 | 1 | 2 | 6 |
| 1990–91 | Washington Capitals | NHL | 9 | 1 | 0 | 1 | 0 | — | — | — | — | — |
| 1991–92 | St. John's Maple Leafs | AHL | 73 | 7 | 23 | 30 | 58 | 16 | 0 | 1 | 1 | 10 |
| NHL totals | | | 803 | 54 | 136 | 190 | 705 | 32 | 0 | 8 | 8 | 22 |
| AHL totals | | | 148 | 14 | 46 | 60 | 126 | 22 | 1 | 2 | 3 | 16 |

== Coaching record ==
| Team | Year | Regular season | | | | | | | Postseason | | | |
| Team | Year | G | W | L | T | OTL | Pts | Finish | W | L | Win % | Result |
|---|---|---|---|---|---|---|---|---|---|---|---|---|
| STL | 1996–97 | 40 | 18 | 15 | 7 | — | (83) | 4th in Central | 2 | 4 | .333 | Lost in conference quarterfinals (DET) |
| STL | 1997–98 | 82 | 45 | 29 | 8 | — | 98 | 3rd in Central | 6 | 4 | .600 | Lost in conference semifinals (DET) |
| STL | 1998–99 | 82 | 37 | 32 | 13 | — | 87 | 2nd in Central | 6 | 7 | .462 | Lost in conference semifinals (DAL) |
| STL | 1999–2000 | 82 | 51 | 19 | 11 | 1 | 114 | 1st in Central | 3 | 4 | .429 | Lost in conference quarterfinals (SJS) |
| STL | 2000–01 | 82 | 43 | 22 | 12 | 5 | 103 | 2nd in Central | 9 | 6 | .600 | Lost in conference finals (COL) |
| STL | 2001–02 | 82 | 43 | 27 | 8 | 4 | 98 | 2nd in Central | 5 | 5 | .500 | Lost in conference semifinals (DET) |
| STL | 2002–03 | 82 | 41 | 24 | 11 | 6 | 99 | 2nd in Central | 3 | 4 | .429 | Lost in conference quarterfinals (VAN) |
| STL | 2003–04 | 61 | 29 | 23 | 7 | 2 | (91) | (fired) | — | — | — | — |
| STL total | | 593 | 307 | 191 | 77 | 18 | | | 34 | 34 | .500 | 7 playoff appearances |
| COL | 2005–06 | 82 | 43 | 30 | — | 9 | 95 | 2nd in Northwest | 4 | 5 | .444 | Lost in conference semifinals (ANA) |
| COL | 2006–07 | 82 | 44 | 31 | — | 7 | 95 | 4th in Northwest | — | — | — | Missed playoffs |
| COL | 2007–08 | 82 | 44 | 31 | — | 7 | 95 | 2nd in Northwest | 4 | 6 | .400 | Lost in conference semifinals (DET) |
| COL total | | 246 | 131 | 92 | — | 23 | | | 8 | 11 | .421 | 2 playoff appearances |
| CHI | 2008–09 | 78 | 45 | 22 | — | 11 | (104) | 2nd in Central | 9 | 8 | .529 | Lost in conference finals (DET) |
| CHI | 2009–10 | 82 | 52 | 22 | — | 8 | 112 | 1st in Central | 16 | 6 | .727 | Won Stanley Cup (PHI) |
| CHI | 2010–11 | 82 | 44 | 29 | — | 9 | 97 | 3rd in Central | 3 | 4 | .429 | Lost in conference quarterfinals (VAN) |
| CHI | 2011–12 | 82 | 45 | 26 | — | 11 | 101 | 4th in Central | 2 | 4 | .333 | Lost in conference quarterfinals (PHX) |
| CHI | 2012–13 | 48 | 36 | 7 | — | 5 | 77 | 1st in Central | 16 | 7 | .696 | Won Stanley Cup (BOS) |
| CHI | 2013–14 | 82 | 46 | 21 | — | 15 | 107 | 3rd in Central | 11 | 8 | .579 | Lost in conference finals (LAK) |
| CHI | 2014–15 | 82 | 48 | 28 | — | 6 | 102 | 3rd in Central | 16 | 7 | .696 | Won Stanley Cup (TBL) |
| CHI | 2015–16 | 82 | 47 | 26 | — | 9 | 103 | 3rd in Central | 3 | 4 | .429 | Lost in first round (STL) |
| CHI | 2016–17 | 82 | 50 | 23 | — | 9 | 109 | 1st in Central | 0 | 4 | .000 | Lost in first round (NSH) |
| CHI | 2017–18 | 82 | 33 | 39 | — | 10 | 76 | 7th in Central | — | — | — | Missed playoffs |
| CHI | 2018–19 | 15 | 6 | 6 | — | 3 | (15) | (fired) | — | — | — | — |
| CHI total | | 797 | 452 | 249 | — | 96 | | | 76 | 52 | .594 | 9 playoff appearances 3 Stanley Cup titles |
| FLA | 2019–20 | 69* | 35 | 26 | — | 8 | 78 | 4th in Atlantic | 1 | 3 | .250 | Lost in qualifying round (NYI) |
| FLA | 2020–21 | 56 | 37 | 14 | — | 5 | 79 | 2nd in Central | 2 | 4 | .333 | Lost in first round (TBL) |
| FLA | 2021–22 | 7 | 7 | 0 | — | 0 | (14) | (resigned) | — | — | — | — |
| FLA total | | 132 | 79 | 40 | — | 13 | | | 3 | 7 | .300 | 2 playoff appearances |
| ANA | 2025–26 | 82 | 43 | 33 | — | 6 | 92 | 3rd in Pacific | 6 | 6 | .500 | Lost in second round (VGK) |
| ANA total | | 82 | 43 | 33 | — | 6 | | | 6 | 6 | .500 | 1 playoff appearance |
| Total | | 1,850 | 1,012 | 605 | 77 | 156 | | | 127 | 110 | .536 | 21 playoff appearances 3 Stanley Cup titles |

- Season shortened due to the COVID-19 pandemic during the 2019–20 season. Playoffs were played in August 2020 with a different format.

== See also ==
- List of NHL head coaches
- List of NHL coach statistical leaders

Sporting positions
| Preceded by Jim Roberts | Head coach of the St. Louis Blues; 1996–2004 | Succeeded by Mike Kitchen |
| Preceded by Tony Granato | Head coach of the Colorado Avalanche; 2004–2008 | Succeeded by Tony Granato |
| Preceded by Denis Savard | Head coach of the Chicago Blackhawks; 2008–2018 | Succeeded by Jeremy Colliton |
| Preceded by Bob Boughner | Head coach of the Florida Panthers; 2019–2021 | Succeeded by Andrew Brunette (interim) |
| Preceded by Greg Cronin | Head coach of the Anaheim Ducks; 2025–present | Incumbent |
Sporting positions
| Preceded by Jacques Martin | Winner of the Jack Adams Award; 2000 | Succeeded by Bill Barber |
