= Jim Roberts (ice hockey, born 1940) =

Canadian ice hockey player (1940–2015)

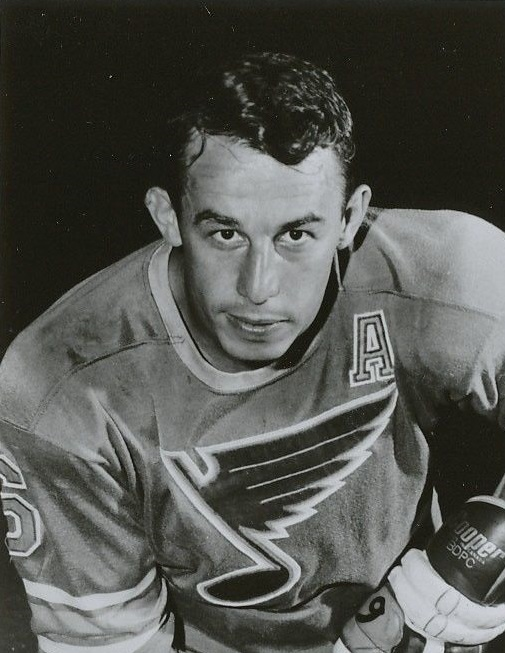
- Roberts with the St. Louis Blues
- Born: April 9, 1940 Toronto, Ontario, Canada
- Died: October 23, 2015 (aged 75) St. Louis, Missouri, U.S.
- Height: 5 ft 10 in (178 cm)
- Weight: 185 lb (84 kg; 13 st 3 lb)
- Position: Defence/Right Wing
- Shot: Right
- Played for: Montreal Canadiens; St. Louis Blues
- Playing career: 1958–1978

James Wilfred Roberts (April 9, 1940 – October 23, 2015), known as Jim Roberts or Jimmy Roberts, was a Canadian ice hockey defenceman and forward.

== Early life ==
Roberts was born in Toronto. After playing for future Montreal Canadiens coach Scotty Bowman with the OHA junior Peterborough Petes, Roberts was signed by the Canadiens and turned pro with the Montreal Royals minor league team in 1959.

== Career ==
In the 1964 season, he saw his first NHL action with Montreal and remained the next several seasons, winning two Stanley Cups before becoming the first selection of the St. Louis Blues in 1967 NHL Expansion Draft. He played solidly for the Blues for five seasons, being named the team captain in 1971 before his trade back to Montreal, where he played for three more Cup winners. Roberts rejoined the Blues for one final season in 1978 before his retirement. He was known for his defensive skills and often used as a "shadow" against high scoring enemy forwards.

After his retirement as a player, Roberts was an interim coach of the Buffalo Sabres under his old mentor Bowman before coaching the Springfield Indians of the American Hockey League to back-to-back Calder Cup championships in 1990 and 1991, after which he was named the head coach of the Hartford Whalers. He went on to be the coach and general manager of the Worcester IceCats of the AHL for two seasons before moving on to be an assistant coach with the St. Louis parent club between 1996 and 2000, including a short stint as the interim head coach in 1997.

Roberts played in 1,006 NHL games, scoring 126 goals and 194 assists for 320 points, and playing in three All-Star Games in 1965, 1969 and 1970. "Jimmy Roberts" was engraved on the Stanley Cup in 1965, 1966, 1973, 1976, 1977 (all with Montreal).

On October 22, 2024, the St. Louis Blues announced Roberts would be inducted into the team's Hall of Fame in January, 2025 along with Wayne Babych and Curtis Joseph.

== Personal life ==
Roberts died on October 23, 2015, of cancer, which had been diagnosed weeks prior. On October 27, 2015, the St. Louis Blues announced team members would wear helmet decals for the home stand that read "JR" in the lower left corner to honor Roberts.

== Career statistics ==
			Regular season					Playoffs
Season	Team	League	GP	G	A	Pts	PIM	GP	G	A	Pts	PIM
1958–59	Peterborough Petes	OHA-Jr.	54	2	8	10	34	19	0	0	0	2
1958–59	Peterborough Petes	M-Cup	—	—	—	—	—	12	2	1	3	2
1959–60	Peterborough Petes	OHA-Jr.	48	6	21	27	55	12	2	7	9	18
1959–60	Montreal Royals	EPHL	—	—	—	—	—	4	0	0	0	4
1960–61	Montreal Royals	EPHL	51	7	18	25	55	—	—	—	—	—
1961–62	Hull-Ottawa Canadiens	EPHL	67	11	28	39	42	13	3	0	3	18
1962–63	Hull-Ottawa Canadiens	EPHL	72	2	27	29	78	3	0	0	0	10
1962–63	Cleveland Barons	AHL	—	—	—	—	—	1	0	0	0	2
1963–64	Montreal Canadiens	NHL	15	0	1	1	2	7	0	1	1	14
1963–64	Omaha Knights	CPHL	46	18	19	37	47	—	—	—	—	—
1963–64	Cleveland Barons	AHL	9	1	3	4	4	—	—	—	—	—
1963–64	Quebec Aces	AHL	2	0	0	0	2	—	—	—	—	—
1964–65	Montreal Canadiens	NHL	70	3	10	13	40	13	0	0	0	30
1965–66	Montreal Canadiens	NHL	70	5	5	10	20	10	1	1	2	10
1966–67	Montreal Canadiens	NHL	63	3	0	3	16	4	1	0	1	0
1967–68	St. Louis Blues	NHL	74	14	23	37	66	18	4	1	5	20
1968–69	St. Louis Blues	NHL	72	14	19	33	81	12	1	4	5	10
1969–70	St. Louis Blues	NHL	76	13	17	30	51	16	2	3	5	29
1970–71	St. Louis Blues	NHL	72	13	18	31	77	6	2	1	3	11
1971–72	St. Louis Blues	NHL	26	5	7	12	4	—	—	—	—	—
1971–72	Montreal Canadiens	NHL	51	7	15	22	53	6	1	0	1	0
1972–73	Montreal Canadiens	NHL	77	14	18	32	28	17	0	2	2	22
1973–74	Montreal Canadiens	NHL	67	8	16	24	39	6	0	0	0	4
1974–75	Montreal Canadiens	NHL	79	5	13	18	52	11	2	2	4	2
1975–76	Montreal Canadiens	NHL	74	13	8	21	35	13	3	1	4	2
1976–77	Montreal Canadiens	NHL	45	5	14	19	18	14	3	0	3	6
1977–78	St. Louis Blues	NHL	75	4	10	14	39	—	—	—	—	—
NHL totals			1,006	126	194	320	621	153	20	16	36	160

== Coaching statistics ==
Team	Year	Regular season						Postseason
Team	Year	G	W	L	T	Pts	Finish	Result
BUF	1981–82	45	21	16	8	(93)	3rd in Adams	(interim; returned to assistant coaching role)
HAR	1991–92	80	26	41	13	65	4th in Adams	Lost in first round
STL	1996–97	9	3	3	3	(83)	4th in Central	(interim; returned to assistant coaching role)
Total		134	50	60	24			

== See also ==
- List of NHL players with 1,000 games played

Preceded by Al Arbour	St. Louis Blues captain 1971–72	Succeeded by Barclay Plager
Preceded by Roger Neilson	Head coach of the Buffalo Sabres; 1981–82	Succeeded by Scotty Bowman
Preceded by Mike Keenan	Head coach of the St. Louis Blues; 1996	Succeeded by Joel Quenneville
Preceded by Rick Ley	Head coach of the Hartford Whalers; 1991–92	Succeeded by Paul Holmgren
