= List of St. Louis Blues head coaches =

The St. Louis Blues are an American professional ice hockey team based in St. Louis. They play in the Central Division of the Western Conference in the National Hockey League (NHL). The team joined the NHL in 1967 as an expansion team with five other teams. The Blues first played their home games at the St. Louis Arena until 1994; they have played their home games at the Enterprise Center, first named the Kiel Center, since then. The majority of the Blues franchise are owned by SLB Acquisition LLC, headed by Tom Stillman; Doug Armstrong is their general manager.

There have been 28 head coaches for the Blues. The franchise's first head coach was Lynn Patrick, who coached for 16 games in his first term. Joel Quenneville is the franchise's all-time leader for the most regular-season games coached (593), the most regular-season game wins (307), the most regular-season points (709), the most playoff games coached (68), and the most playoff-game wins (34). Barclay Plager and Bob Plager are the only pair of brothers to have coached the Blues; Barclay coached for four seasons, and Bob coached for eleven games. Red Berenson, Brian Sutter, Quenneville and Ken Hitchcock are the only head coaches to have been awarded the Jack Adams Award with the Blues. Scotty Bowman, Al Arbour, and Emile Francis are the only Blues head coaches to have been elected to the Hockey Hall of Fame as a builder. Six coaches have spent their entire NHL head coaching careers with the Blues.

Jim Montgomery serves as head coach of the Blues, after being named to the role on November 24, 2024, following the firing of Drew Bannister.

== Key ==
#	Number of coaches^{[a]}
GC	Games coached
W	Wins = 2 points
L	Losses = 0 points
T	Ties = 1 point
OT	Overtime/shootout losses = 1 point^{[b]}
PTS	Points
Win%	Winning percentage
*	Spent entire NHL coaching career with the Blues
†	Elected to the Hockey Hall of Fame as a builder

== Coaches ==
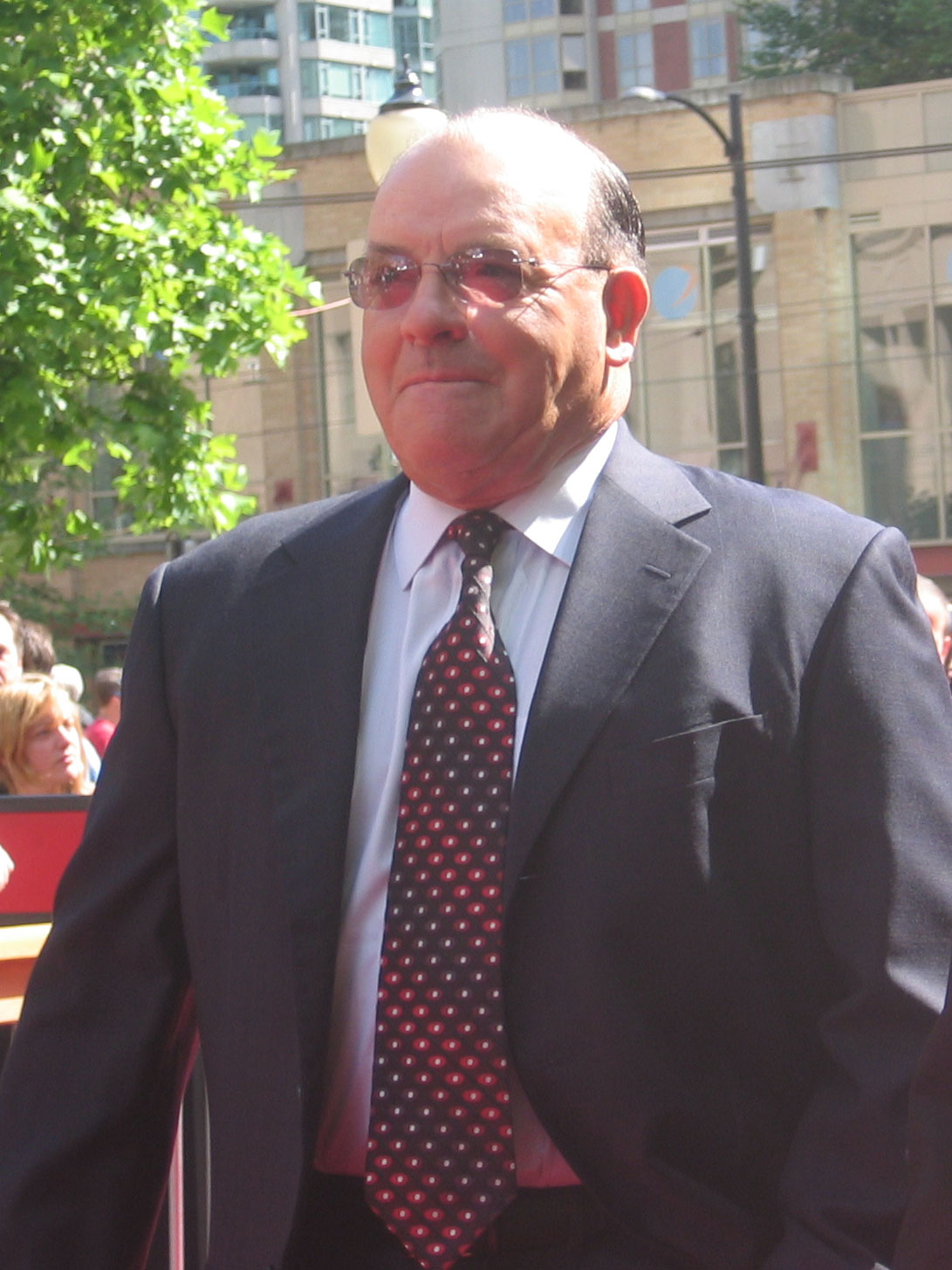
Scotty Bowman has coached the Blues for two stints that comprise four seasons.

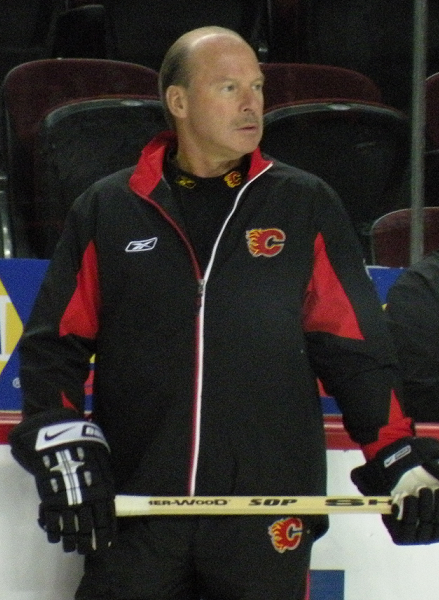
Mike Keenan (shown with the Calgary Flames) coached the Blues for three seasons.

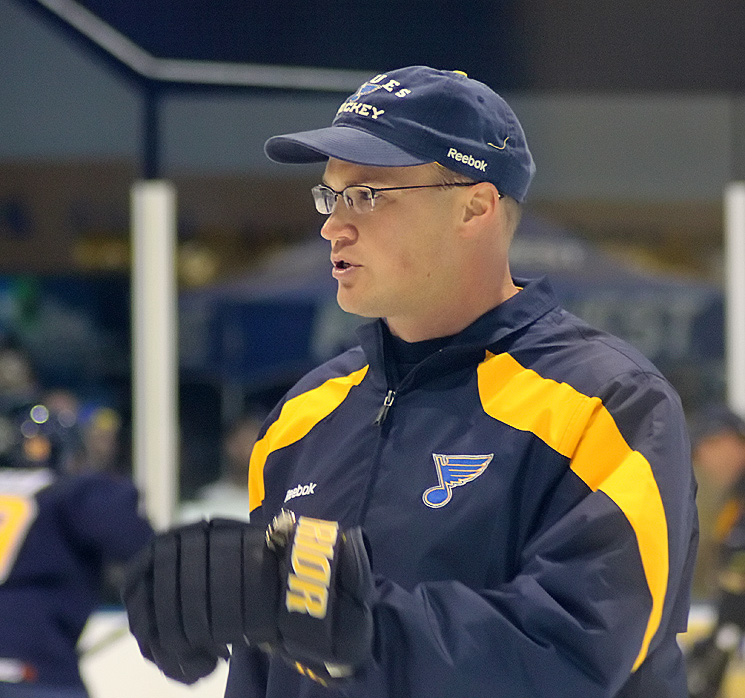
Davis Payne coached the Blues for 137 games from 2010 to 2011.

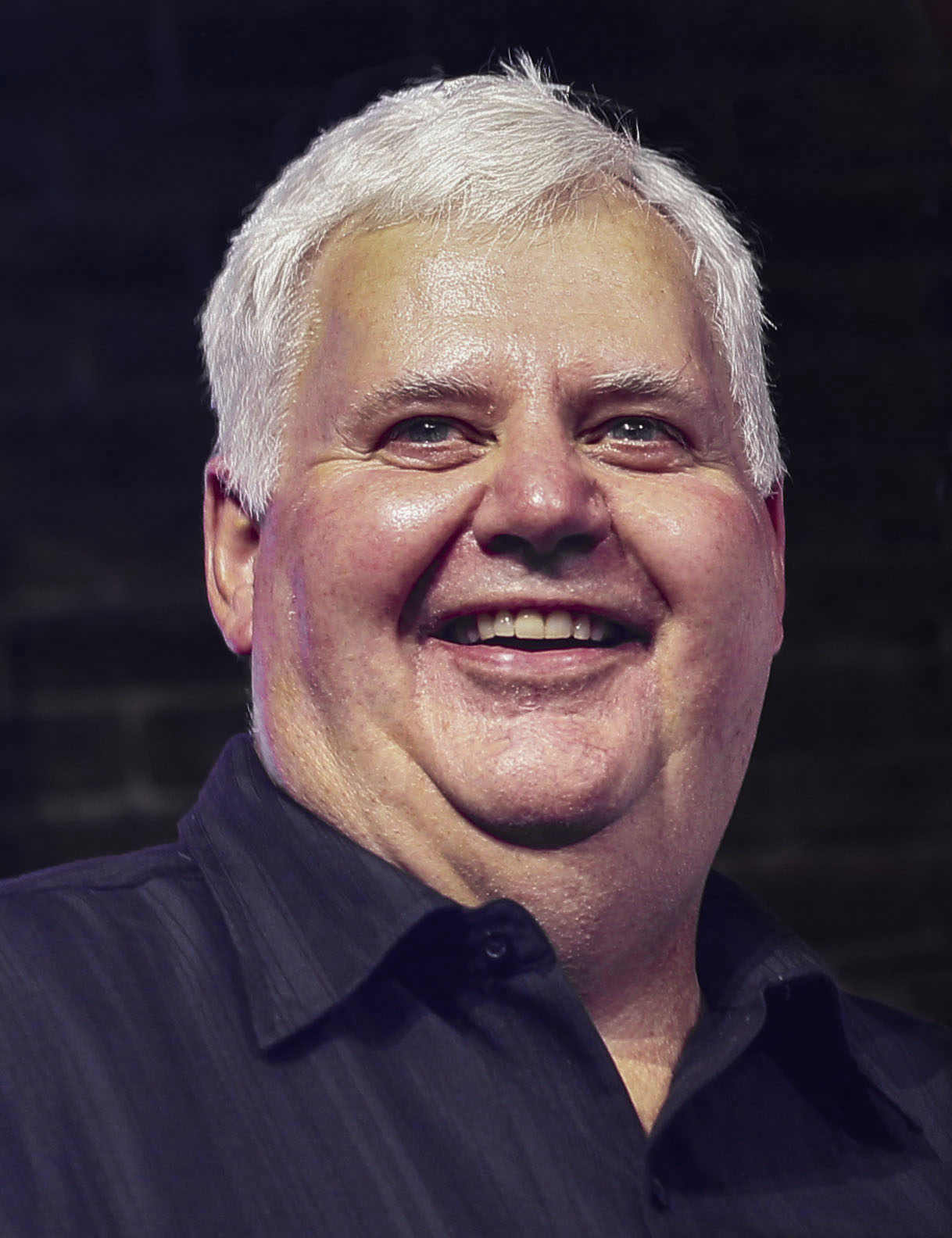
Ken Hitchcock was the head coach of the Blues from 2011 until 2017.

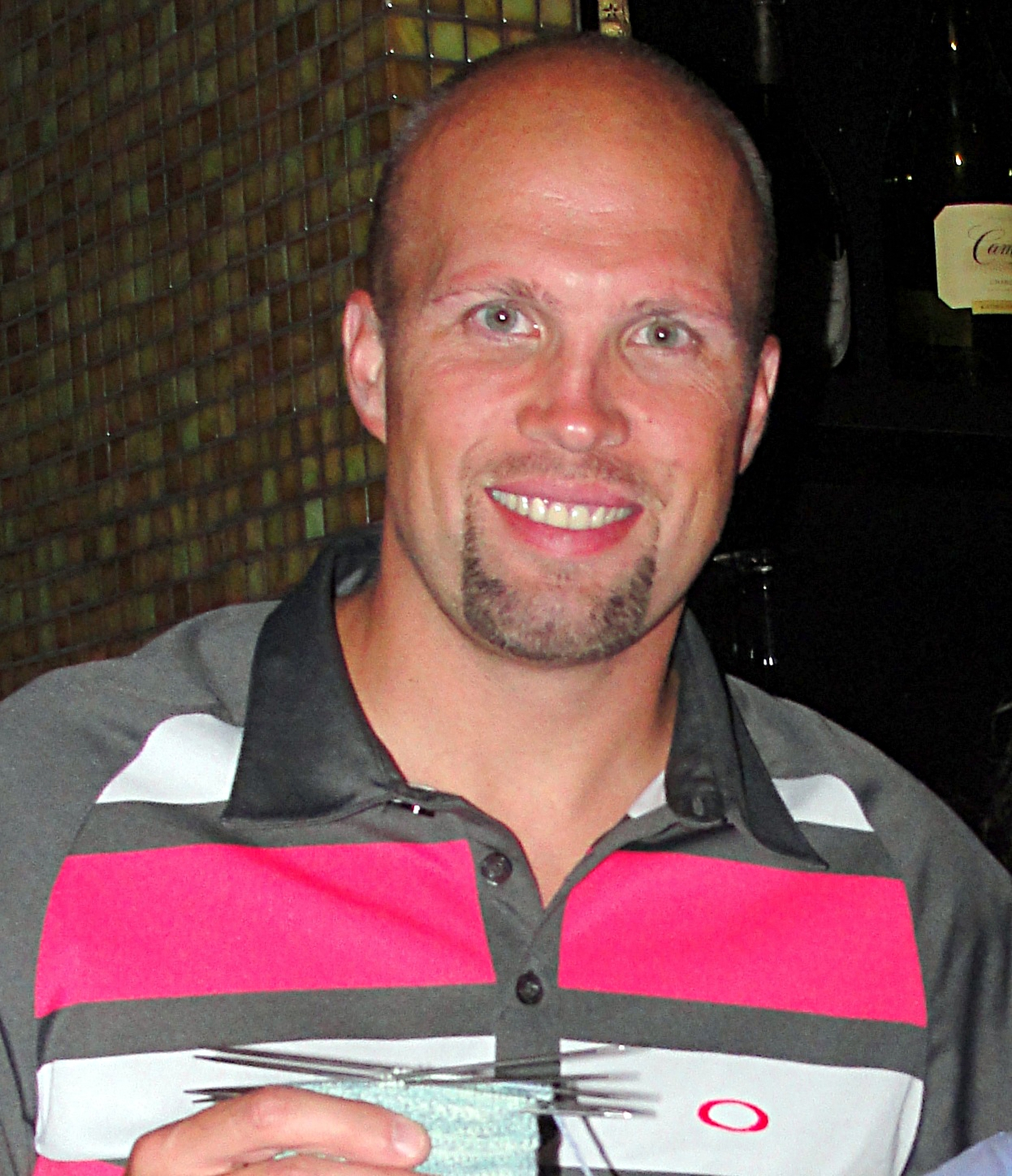
Mike Yeo served as head coach of the Blues from 2017 to 2018.

Note: Statistics are correct through the hiring of Montgomery during the 2025–26 season.

#	Name	Term^{[c]}	Regular season						Playoffs				Achievements	Reference
#	Name	Term^{[c]}	GC	W	L	T/OT	PTS	Win%	GC	W	L	Win%	Achievements	Reference
1	Lynn Patrick	1967	16	4	10	2	10	.313	—	—	—	—		
2	Scotty Bowman†	1967–1970	210	97	79	40	234	.557	46	24	22	.522		
3	Al Arbour†	1970–1971	50	21	15	14	56	.560	—	—	—	—		
—	Scotty Bowman†	1971	28	13	10	5	31	.553	6	2	4	.333		
4	Sid Abel	1971	10	3	6	1	7	.350	—	—	—	—		
5	Bill McCreary, Sr.	1971	24	6	14	4	16	.333	—	—	—	—		
—	Al Arbour†	1971–1972	57	21	25	11	53	.447	11	4	7	.364		
6	Jean-Guy Talbot	1972–1974	120	52	53	15	119	.496	5	1	4	.200		
7	Lou Angotti	1974	32	6	20	6	18	.281	—	—	—	—		
—	Lynn Patrick	1974	2	1	0	1	3	.750	—	—	—	—		
8	Garry Young	1974–1975	98	41	41	16	98	.500	2	0	2	.000		
—	Lynn Patrick	1975–1976	8	3	5	0	6	.375	—	—	—	—		
9	Leo Boivin*	1976	43	17	17	9	43	.500	3	1	2	.333		
10	Emile Francis†	1976–1977	80	32	39	9	73	.456	4	0	4	.000		
—	Leo Boivin*	1977–1978	80	20	47	13	53	.331	—	—	—	—		
11	Barclay Plager*	1978–1979	104	25	64	15	65	.310	—	—	—	—		
12	Red Berenson*	1979–1982	204	100	72	32	232	.569	14	5	9	.357	1980–81 Jack Adams Award winner	
—	Emile Francis†	1982–1982	44	14	25	5	33	.375	10	5	5	.500		
—	Barclay Plager*	1982–1983	48	15	21	12	42	.438	4	1	3	.250		
13	Jacques Demers	1983–1986	240	106	106	28	240	.500	33	16	17	.485		
14	Jacques Martin	1986–1988	160	66	71	23	155	.484	16	7	9	.438		
15	Brian Sutter	1988–1992	320	153	124	43	349	.545	41	20	21	.488	1990–91 Jack Adams Award winner	
16	Bob Plager*	1992	11	4	6	1	9	.409	—	—	—	—		
17	Bob Berry	1992–1994	157	73	63	21	167	.532	15	7	8	.467		
18	Mike Keenan	1994–1996	163	75	66	22	172	.528	20	10	10	.500		
19	Jim Roberts	1996–1997	9	3	3	3	9	.500	—	—	—	—		
20	Joel Quenneville	1997–2004	593	307	191	95	709	.598	68	34	34	.500	1999–2000 Jack Adams Award winner	
21	Mike Kitchen*	2004–2006	131	38	70	23	99	.378	—	—	—	—		
22	Andy Murray	2006–2010	258	118	102	38	274	.531	4	0	4	.000		
23	Davis Payne*	2010–2011	137	67	55	15	149	.544	—	—	—	—		
24	Ken Hitchcock	2011–2017	413	248	124	41	537	.650	45	20	25	.444	2011–12 Jack Adams Award winner	
25	Mike Yeo	2017–2018	133	73	49	11	157	.590	—	—	—	—		
26	Craig Berube	2018–2023	382	206	132	44	239	.594	51	24	27	.471	2019 Stanley Cup championship	
27	Drew Bannister*	2023–2024	76	39	31	6	84	.553	—	—	—	—		
28	Jim Montgomery	2024–present	142	72	51	19	163	.574	—	—	—	—		

== Notes ==
- ^{a} A running total of the number of coaches of the Blues. Thus, any coach who has two or more separate terms as head coach is only counted once.
- ^{b} Before the 2005–06 season, the NHL instituted a penalty shootout for regular season games that remained tied after a five-minute overtime period, which prevented ties.
- ^{c} Each year is linked to an article about that particular NHL season.
