= Mike Kitchen =

Canadian ice hockey player (born 1956)

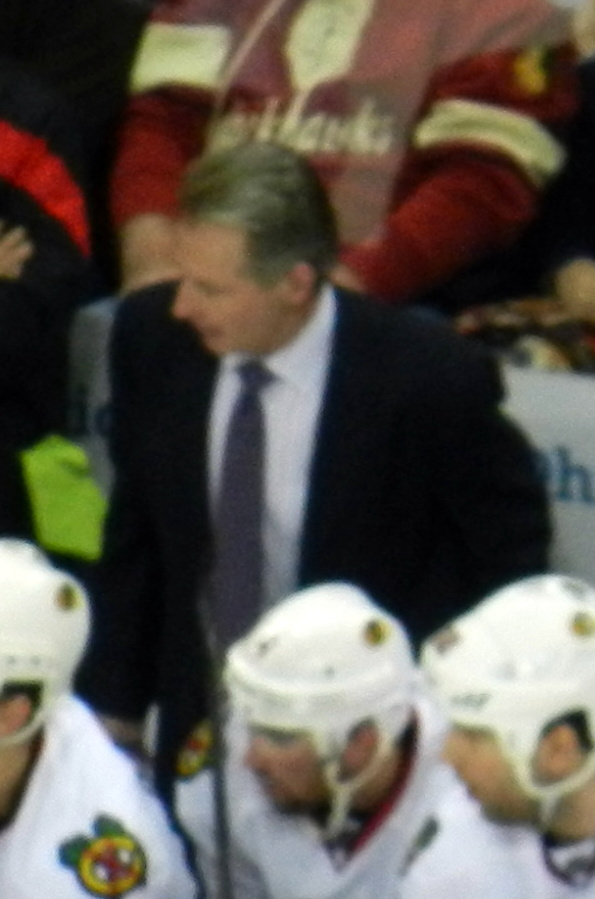
- Kitchen as an assistant coach for the Blackhawks in 2012
- Born: February 1, 1956 (age 70) Newmarket, Ontario, Canada
- Height: 5 ft 10 in (178 cm)
- Weight: 185 lb (84 kg; 13 st 3 lb)
- Position: Defence
- Shot: Left
- Played for: Colorado Rockies; New Jersey Devils
- NHL draft: 38th overall, 1976; Kansas City Scouts
- WHA draft: 83rd overall, 1976; Toronto Toros
- Playing career: 1976–1985

Michael Elwin Kitchen (born February 1, 1956) is a Canadian former defenceman and coach. He most recently was an assistant coach for the Florida Panthers of the National Hockey League. As of February 2016, Kitchen has coached in over 2400 NHL games including playoffs. In 2012/2013 he assisted in coaching the Hawks to their longest winning streak without a loss. He also spent time as the head coach of the Lake Simcoe Snappers, the Georgina Men’s League Champions.

He was selected in the third round of the 1976 NHL Amateur Draft, 38th overall, by the Kansas City Scouts. He was also taken in the seventh round of the 1976 WHA Amateur Draft, 83rd overall, by the Toronto Toros, although Kitchen ultimately chose to enter the NHL. Kitchen was born in Newmarket, Ontario, but grew up in Schomberg, Ontario.

Mike is well known for his charitable work and has used his day with the Stanley Cup to raise funds for Southlake Regional Health Centre and other local charities.

Kitchen is the older brother of Bill Kitchen, also a former hockey player.

== Playing career ==
A defensive defenceman, Kitchen played his amateur career with the Toronto Marlboros of the Ontario Hockey Association, winning a Memorial Cup in 1975. He turned professional for the 1976–77 NHL season, serving a brief, 14-game apprenticeship Rhode Island Reds of the AHL, before making his NHL debut. Kitchen joined the newly relocated Colorado Rockies in his first professional season, and spent his entire NHL career with the same franchise, becoming the only player to play for the Rockies in all six seasons of their existence. The team moved to New Jersey after the 1981–82 NHL season, and Kitchen went on to play two more seasons for the New Jersey Devils. Kitchen was sent to the Maine Mariners of the AHL for the entire 1984–85 NHL season, and decided to retire following that season's conclusion.

== Coaching career ==
Kitchen was hired as an assistant coach by the Newmarket Saints of the AHL for the 1988–89 season, and was subsequently hired for the same position by the Toronto Maple Leafs, where he spent eight seasons helping them to conference finals appearances in 1993 and 1994. He then left Toronto for the same position with the St. Louis Blues franchise, a position he held until his elevation to head coach halfway through the 2003–04 NHL season. The Blues struggled and were 9th place in the Western Conference when they fired Joel Quenneville and replaced him with Kitchen as head coach. However under Kitchen, they picked up their play and went 10–7–4 in the process to make the playoffs once again.

In the 2005–2006 NHL season, Mike Kitchen led a younger group of Blues to a 21–46–15 record. 2006–2007 started the same as the Blues stumbled out of the gate to a 7–17–4 mark. On December 11, 2006, after a seven-game losing streak, Kitchen was fired as head coach of the St. Louis Blues and replaced by former Los Angeles Kings head coach Andy Murray. Blues president John Davidson indicated that he would like Kitchen to remain with the organization in a different capacity.

At the end of that season, Kitchen left the Blues to become an assistant coach with the Florida Panthers in 2007. He stayed with the club through the 2009-2010 season. With that contract having expired, on July 12, 2010 Mike agreed to a contract with the Chicago Blackhawks which saw him reunited with head coach Joel Quenneville. Joel and Mike had coached together in St. Louis from 1998 - 2003, leading the Blues to a franchise record 114 points in 1999-2000 while winning the President’s Trophy.

The Hawks were fresh off their first Stanley Cup victory in 49 years. Since arriving, Kitchen helped the team win two more Stanley Cups, in 2012-2013 and in 2014-2015.

Kitchen was relieved of his duties with the Blackhawks, which focused on defense and the penalty kill, on April 24, 2017 following the team's second consecutive first-round playoff exit, this time against the Nashville Predators after a 4-0 sweep.

In 2018, Kitchen joined Team Canada for the first time as an assistant coach. The team participated in the 92nd Spengler Cup, which was held from 26 to 31 December 2018 at the Vaillant Arena, Davos. Canada placed second in this tournament.

After being away from hockey for two seasons, Kitchen reunited once more with Joel Quenneville this time with the Florida Panthers again for the second time In his career as an assistant coach with the team, this time instead working under Quenneville’s watch for the upcoming 2019-20 NHL Season.

== Career statistics ==
=== Regular season and playoffs ===
			Regular season					Playoffs
Season	Team	League	GP	G	A	Pts	PIM	GP	G	A	Pts	PIM
1972–73	Aurora Tigers	OPJAHL	44	5	14	19	138	—	—	—	—	—
1973–74	Toronto Marlboros	OHA	69	3	17	20	145	—	—	—	—	—
1974–75	Toronto Marlboros	OMJHL	68	5	30	35	136	21	1	9	10	35
1974–75	Toronto Marlboros	M-Cup	—	—	—	—	—	4	0	4	4	8
1975–76	Toronto Marlboros	OMJHL	65	6	18	24	148	10	0	2	2	26
1976–77	Rhode Island Reds	AHL	14	0	10	10	14	—	—	—	—	—
1976–77	Colorado Rockies	NHL	60	1	8	9	36	—	—	—	—	—
1977–78	Colorado Rockies	NHL	61	2	17	19	45	2	0	0	0	2
1978–79	Colorado Rockies	NHL	53	1	4	5	28	—	—	—	—	—
1979–80	Colorado Rockies	NHL	42	1	6	7	25	—	—	—	—	—
1979–80	Fort Worth Texans	CHL	30	0	9	9	22	15	0	1	1	16
1980–81	Colorado Rockies	NHL	75	1	7	8	100	—	—	—	—	—
1981–82	Fort Worth Texans	CHL	13	1	5	6	16	—	—	—	—	—
1981–82	Colorado Rockies	NHL	63	1	8	9	60	—	—	—	—	—
1982–83	New Jersey Devils	NHL	77	4	8	12	52	—	—	—	—	—
1983–84	New Jersey Devils	NHL	43	1	4	5	24	—	—	—	—	—
1984–85	Maine Mariners	AHL	12	0	1	1	10	—	—	—	—	—
NHL totals			474	12	62	74	370	2	0	0	0	2

=== Coaching record ===
Team	Year	Regular season							Post season
Team	Year	G	W	L	T	OTL	Pts	Finish	Result
STL	2003–04	21	10	7	4	0	(91)	2nd in Central	Lost in first round (SJS)
STL	2005–06	82	21	46	–	15	57	5th in Central	Missed playoffs
STL	2006–07	28	7	17	–	4	(81)	3rd in Central	(fired)
Total		131	38	70	4	19			

== Transactions ==
- July 15, 1976 - Kitchen's rights transferred to Colorado after the franchise relocated
- June 30, 1982 - Kitchen's rights transferred to New Jersey after the franchise relocated

== Awards ==
- 1975 - OMJHL First All-Star Team
- 1975 - Memorial Cup Tournament All-Star Team
- 2013 and 2015 – Stanley Cup Champion (as an assistant coach)
- 2016 - Inducted into the Aurora Sports Hall of Fame in the category of Athlete/Hockey.

Click on the link and watch Kitchen’s induction ceremony and video documentary. https://aurorashof.ca/inductee/mike-kitch-kitchen/

== See also ==
- List of NHL head coaches

Preceded by Joel Quenneville	Head coach of the St. Louis Blues; 2004–06	Succeeded by Andy Murray
