= List of National Hockey League head coaching wins and point percentage leaders =

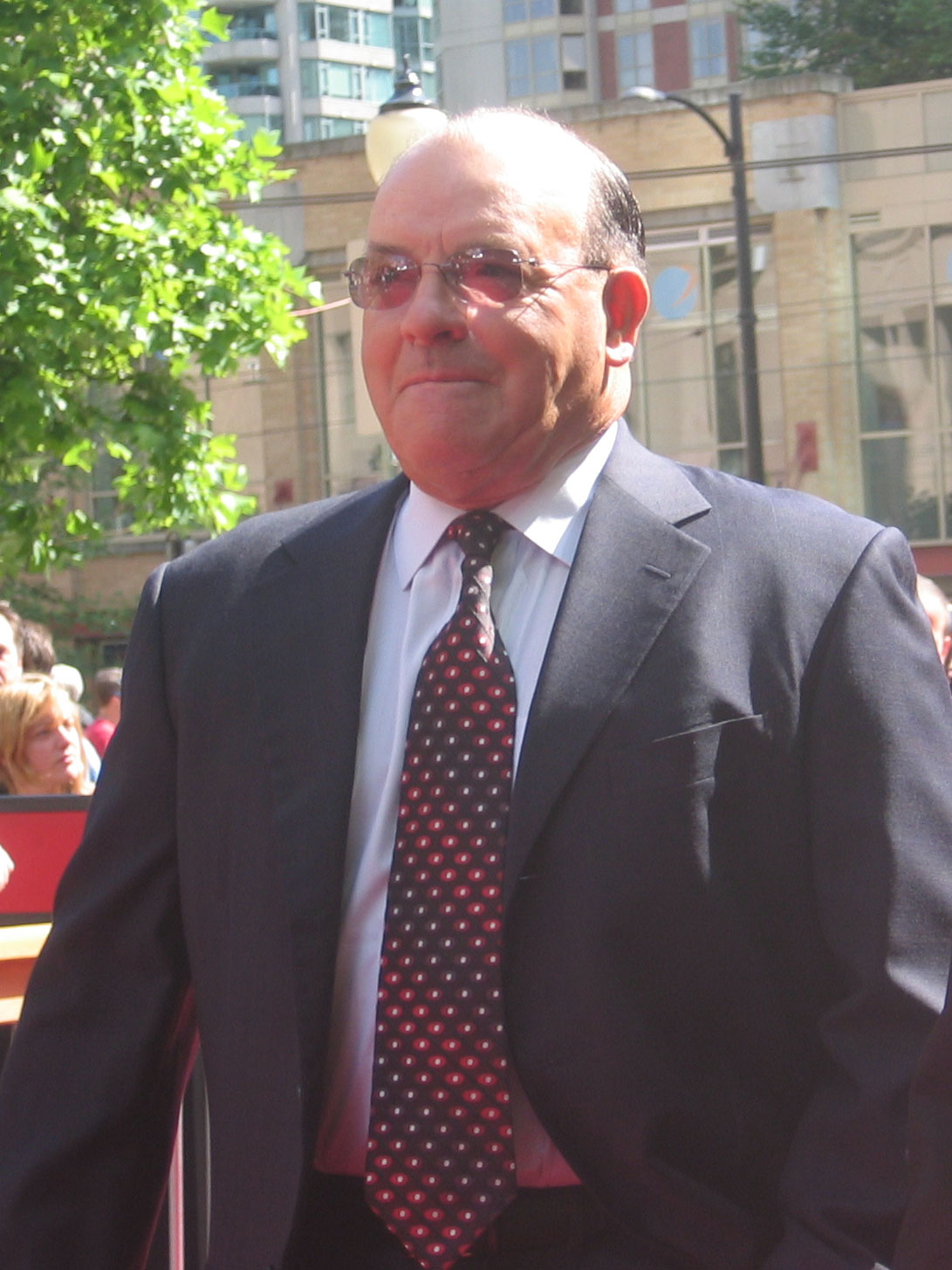
Scotty Bowman is the all-time leader in career wins by an NHL coach.

The following is a list of National Hockey League head coaching wins and point percentage leaders.

Scotty Bowman holds the current records for regular season wins at 1,244. In the history of the NHL since its first season in 1917, the season structure has changed numerous times, going from 22 games in its first season to 48 by 1931 to 70 by 1949 to 80 by 1974 to its current structure of 82 since 1995. Teams received a point for games that finished in a tie, since teams had no overtimes to play from November 21, 1942 until June 23, 1983. From 1983 to 1998, teams did not get a point for losing in overtime. The 1999–2000 season saw overtime losses (OTL) created as a statistic due to teams now being awarded a point for losing in overtime. Ties were finally abolished starting with the 2005–2006 season. As of the end of the 2025–2026 season, 58 coaches have won 300 games. Scotty Bowman holds the record for postseason wins at 223.

Among active head coaches, Joel Quenneville is the leader in regular season and postseason wins.

== Regular season wins ==
This sortable table shows the top NHL head coaches in order of total regular season wins (minimum of 300 wins). The table also shows every team for which he was a head coach and his record with each team. When sorting by team, coaches are listed in order of wins for that team.

Key
† Inducted into the Hockey Hall of Fame as a head coach
~ Inducted into the Hockey Hall of Fame as a player
* Active head coach
Head coach with most wins for team

| Rank | Coach | Career wins | Career losses | Career ties | Career OTL (Note: From November 21, 1942 until June 23, 1983, the NHL did not have overtime and thus had ties after 60 minutes. If the then five-minute overtime period ended with no scoring, the game ended as a tie. OTL was created with the 1999-2000 season to give teams a point if they lost in overtime. Starting with the 2005-06 seasons, ties were abolished in favor of the shootout after overtime ended with no goals.) | Games coached | Team(s) | Seasons | W | L | T | OTL |
|---|---|---|---|---|---|---|---|---|---|---|---|---|
| 1 | Scotty Bowman † | 1,244 | 573 | 314 | 10 | 2,140 | St. Louis Blues | 1967–1971 | 110 | 83 | 45 | – |
| 1 | Scotty Bowman † | 1,244 | 573 | 314 | 10 | 2,140 | Montreal Canadiens | 1971–1979 | 419 | 110 | 105 | – |
| 1 | Scotty Bowman † | 1,244 | 573 | 314 | 10 | 2,140 | Buffalo Sabres | 1979–1987 | 210 | 134 | 60 | – |
| 1 | Scotty Bowman † | 1,244 | 573 | 314 | 10 | 2,140 | Pittsburgh Penguins | 1991–1993 | 95 | 53 | 16 | – |
| 1 | Scotty Bowman † | 1,244 | 573 | 314 | 10 | 2,140 | Detroit Red Wings | 1993–2002 | 410 | 193 | 88 | 10 |
| 2 | Joel Quenneville * | 1,012 | 605 | 77 | 156 | 1,850 | St. Louis Blues | 1996–2004 | 307 | 191 | 77 | 18 |
| 2 | Joel Quenneville * | 1,012 | 605 | 77 | 156 | 1,850 | Colorado Avalanche | 2005–2008 | 131 | 92 | – | 23 |
| 2 | Joel Quenneville * | 1,012 | 605 | 77 | 156 | 1,850 | Chicago Blackhawks | 2008–2019 | 452 | 249 | – | 96 |
| 2 | Joel Quenneville * | 1,012 | 605 | 77 | 156 | 1,850 | Florida Panthers | 2019–2022 | 79 | 40 | – | 13 |
| 2 | Joel Quenneville * | 1,012 | 605 | 77 | 156 | 1,850 | Anaheim Ducks | 2025–present | 43 | 33 | – | 6 |
| 3 | Paul Maurice * | 956 | 805 | 99 | 152 | 2,013 | Hartford Whalers | 1995–1997 | 61 | 72 | 19 | 0 |
| 3 | Paul Maurice * | 956 | 805 | 99 | 152 | 2,013 | Carolina Hurricanes | 1997–2003, 2008–2011 | 323 | 319 | 80 | 46 |
| 3 | Paul Maurice * | 956 | 805 | 99 | 152 | 2,013 | Toronto Maple Leafs | 2006–2008 | 76 | 66 | – | 22 |
| 3 | Paul Maurice * | 956 | 805 | 99 | 152 | 2,013 | Winnipeg Jets | 2014–2021 | 315 | 223 | – | 62 |
| 3 | Paul Maurice * | 956 | 805 | 99 | 152 | 2,013 | Florida Panthers | 2022–present | 181 | 125 | – | 22 |
| 4 | Lindy Ruff * | 950 | 741 | 78 | 169 | 1,938 | Buffalo Sabres | 1997–2013, 2024–present | 607 | 471 | 78 | 91 |
| 4 | Lindy Ruff * | 950 | 741 | 78 | 169 | 1,938 | Dallas Stars | 2013–2017 | 165 | 122 | – | 41 |
| 4 | Lindy Ruff * | 950 | 741 | 78 | 169 | 1,938 | New Jersey Devils | 2020–2024 | 128 | 125 | – | 28 |
| 4 | Lindy Ruff * | 950 | 741 | 78 | 169 | 1,938 | Buffalo Sabres | 2024–present | 86 | 62 | – | 16 |
| 5 | Barry Trotz | 914 | 670 | 60 | 168 | 1,812 | Nashville Predators | 1998–2014 | 557 | 479 | 60 | 100 |
| 5 | Barry Trotz | 914 | 670 | 60 | 168 | 1,812 | Washington Capitals | 2014–2018 | 205 | 89 | – | 34 |
| 5 | Barry Trotz | 914 | 670 | 60 | 168 | 1,812 | New York Islanders | 2018–2022 | 152 | 102 | – | 34 |
| 6 | Ken Hitchcock † | 849 | 534 | 88 | 127 | 1,598 | Dallas Stars | 1995–2002, 2017–2018 | 319 | 186 | 60 | 20 |
| 6 | Ken Hitchcock † | 849 | 534 | 88 | 127 | 1,598 | Philadelphia Flyers | 2002–2006 | 131 | 73 | 28 | 22 |
| 6 | Ken Hitchcock † | 849 | 534 | 88 | 127 | 1,598 | Columbus Blue Jackets | 2006–2010 | 125 | 123 | – | 36 |
| 6 | Ken Hitchcock † | 849 | 534 | 88 | 127 | 1,598 | St. Louis Blues | 2011–2017 | 248 | 124 | – | 41 |
| 6 | Ken Hitchcock † | 849 | 534 | 88 | 127 | 1,598 | Edmonton Oilers | 2018–2019 | 26 | 28 | – | 8 |
| 7 | Peter Laviolette | 851 | 573 | 25 | 163 | 1,612 | New York Islanders | 2001–2003 | 77 | 62 | 19 | 6 |
| 7 | Peter Laviolette | 851 | 573 | 25 | 163 | 1,612 | Carolina Hurricanes | 2003–2009 | 167 | 122 | 6 | 28 |
| 7 | Peter Laviolette | 851 | 573 | 25 | 163 | 1,612 | Philadelphia Flyers | 2009–2014 | 145 | 98 | – | 29 |
| 7 | Peter Laviolette | 851 | 573 | 25 | 163 | 1,612 | Nashville Predators | 2014–2020 | 248 | 143 | – | 60 |
| 7 | Peter Laviolette | 851 | 573 | 25 | 163 | 1,612 | Washington Capitals | 2020–2023 | 115 | 78 | – | 27 |
| 7 | Peter Laviolette | 851 | 573 | 25 | 163 | 1,612 | New York Rangers | 2023–2025 | 94 | 59 | – | 11 |
| 7 | Peter Laviolette | 851 | 573 | 25 | 163 | 1,612 | Los Angeles Kings | 2026-present | 5 | 11 | – | 2 |
| 8 | Al Arbour † | 782 | 577 | 248 | 0 | 1,607 | St. Louis Blues | 1970–1973 | 42 | 40 | 25 | – |
| 8 | Al Arbour † | 782 | 577 | 248 | 0 | 1,607 | New York Islanders | 1973–1986, 1988–1994, 2007 | 740 | 537 | 223 | 0 |
| 9 | John Tortorella * | 777 | 648 | 37 | 166 | 1,628 | New York Rangers | 2000, 2009–2013 | 171 | 118 | 1 | 29 |
| 9 | John Tortorella * | 777 | 648 | 37 | 166 | 1,628 | Tampa Bay Lightning | 2001–2008 | 239 | 222 | 36 | 38 |
| 9 | John Tortorella * | 777 | 648 | 37 | 166 | 1,628 | Vancouver Canucks | 2013–2014 | 36 | 35 | – | 11 |
| 9 | John Tortorella * | 777 | 648 | 37 | 166 | 1,628 | Columbus Blue Jackets | 2015–2021 | 227 | 166 | – | 54 |
| 9 | John Tortorella * | 777 | 648 | 37 | 166 | 1,628 | Philadelphia Flyers | 2022–2025 | 97 | 107 | – | 33 |
| 9 | John Tortorella * | 777 | 648 | 37 | 166 | 1,628 | Vegas Golden Knights | 2026 | 7 | 0 | – | 1 |
| 10 | Darryl Sutter | 737 | 530 | 101 | 111 | 1,479 | Chicago Blackhawks | 1992–1995 | 110 | 80 | 26 | – |
| 10 | Darryl Sutter | 737 | 530 | 101 | 111 | 1,479 | San Jose Sharks | 1997–2002 | 192 | 167 | 60 | 15 |
| 10 | Darryl Sutter | 737 | 530 | 101 | 111 | 1,479 | Calgary Flames | 2002–2006, 2021–2023 | 210 | 136 | 15 | 43 |
| 10 | Darryl Sutter | 737 | 530 | 101 | 111 | 1,479 | Los Angeles Kings | 2011–2017 | 225 | 147 | – | 53 |
| 11 | Alain Vigneault | 722 | 489 | 35 | 117 | 1,363 | Montreal Canadiens | 1997–2000 | 109 | 118 | 35 | 4 |
| 11 | Alain Vigneault | 722 | 489 | 35 | 117 | 1,363 | Vancouver Canucks | 2006–2013 | 313 | 170 | – | 57 |
| 11 | Alain Vigneault | 722 | 489 | 35 | 117 | 1,363 | New York Rangers | 2013–2018 | 226 | 147 | – | 37 |
| 11 | Alain Vigneault | 722 | 489 | 35 | 117 | 1,363 | Philadelphia Flyers | 2019–2021 | 74 | 54 | – | 19 |
| 12 | Mike Babcock | 700 | 418 | 19 | 164 | 1,301 | Mighty Ducks of Anaheim | 2002–2004 | 69 | 62 | 19 | 14 |
| 12 | Mike Babcock | 700 | 418 | 19 | 164 | 1,301 | Detroit Red Wings | 2005–2015 | 458 | 223 | – | 105 |
| 12 | Mike Babcock | 700 | 418 | 19 | 164 | 1,301 | Toronto Maple Leafs | 2015–2019 | 173 | 133 | – | 45 |
| 13 | Dick Irvin † | 692 | 527 | 230 | 0 | 1,449 | Chicago Black Hawks | 1929–1931, 1955–1956 | 45 | 62 | 19 | – |
| 13 | Dick Irvin † | 692 | 527 | 230 | 0 | 1,449 | Toronto Maple Leafs | 1931–1940 | 216 | 152 | 59 | – |
| 13 | Dick Irvin † | 692 | 527 | 230 | 0 | 1,449 | Montreal Canadiens | 1941–1955 | 431 | 313 | 152 | – |
| 14 | Pat Quinn † | 684 | 528 | 154 | 34 | 1,400 | Philadelphia Flyers | 1979–1982 | 141 | 73 | 48 | – |
| 14 | Pat Quinn † | 684 | 528 | 154 | 34 | 1,400 | Los Angeles Kings | 1984–1987 | 75 | 101 | 26 | – |
| 14 | Pat Quinn † | 684 | 528 | 154 | 34 | 1,400 | Vancouver Canucks | 1991–1995 | 141 | 111 | 28 | – |
| 14 | Pat Quinn † | 684 | 528 | 154 | 34 | 1,400 | Toronto Maple Leafs | 1998–2006 | 300 | 196 | 52 | 26 |
| 14 | Pat Quinn † | 684 | 528 | 154 | 34 | 1,400 | Edmonton Oilers | 2009–2010 | 27 | 47 | | 8 |
| 15 | Mike Keenan | 672 | 531 | 147 | 36 | 1,386 | Philadelphia Flyers | 1984–1988 | 190 | 102 | 28 | – |
| 15 | Mike Keenan | 672 | 531 | 147 | 36 | 1,386 | Chicago Blackhawks | 1988–1992 | 153 | 126 | 41 | – |
| 15 | Mike Keenan | 672 | 531 | 147 | 36 | 1,386 | New York Rangers | 1993–1994 | 52 | 24 | 8 | – |
| 15 | Mike Keenan | 672 | 531 | 147 | 36 | 1,386 | St. Louis Blues | 1994–1997 | 75 | 66 | 22 | – |
| 15 | Mike Keenan | 672 | 531 | 147 | 36 | 1,386 | Vancouver Canucks | 1997–1999 | 36 | 54 | 18 | – |
| 15 | Mike Keenan | 672 | 531 | 147 | 36 | 1,386 | Boston Bruins | 2000–2001 | 33 | 26 | 7 | 8 |
| 15 | Mike Keenan | 672 | 531 | 147 | 36 | 1,386 | Florida Panthers | 2001–2003 | 45 | 73 | 23 | 12 |
| 15 | Mike Keenan | 672 | 531 | 147 | 36 | 1,386 | Calgary Flames | 2007–2009 | 88 | 60 | – | 16 |
| 16 | Claude Julien | 667 | 445 | 10 | 152 | 1,274 | Montreal Canadiens | 2002–2006, 2017–2020 | 201 | 175 | 10 | 50 |
| 16 | Claude Julien | 667 | 445 | 10 | 152 | 1,274 | New Jersey Devils | 2006–2007 | 47 | 24 | | 8 |
| 16 | Claude Julien | 667 | 445 | 10 | 152 | 1,274 | Boston Bruins | 2008–2017 | 419 | 246 | | 94 |
| 17 | Todd McLellan * | 673 | 471 | 0 | 151 | 1,295 | San Jose Sharks | 2008–2015 | 311 | 163 | – | 66 |
| 17 | Todd McLellan * | 673 | 471 | 0 | 151 | 1,295 | Edmonton Oilers | 2015–2018 | 123 | 119 | – | 24 |
| 17 | Todd McLellan * | 673 | 471 | 0 | 151 | 1,295 | Los Angeles Kings | 2019–2024 | 164 | 130 | – | 44 |
| 17 | Todd McLellan * | 673 | 471 | 0 | 151 | 1,295 | Detroit Red Wings | 2024–present | 75 | 59 | – | 17 |
| 18 | Peter DeBoer * | 672 | 456 | 0 | 156 | 1,284 | Florida Panthers | 2008–2011 | 103 | 107 | – | 36 |
| 18 | Peter DeBoer * | 672 | 456 | 0 | 156 | 1,284 | New Jersey Devils | 2011–2014 | 114 | 93 | – | 25 |
| 18 | Peter DeBoer * | 672 | 456 | 0 | 156 | 1,284 | San Jose Sharks | 2015–2019 | 198 | 129 | – | 34 |
| 18 | Peter DeBoer * | 672 | 456 | 0 | 156 | 1,284 | Vegas Golden Knights | 2020–2022 | 98 | 50 | – | 12 |
| 18 | Peter DeBoer * | 672 | 456 | 0 | 156 | 1,284 | Dallas Stars | 2022–2025 | 149 | 68 | – | 29 |
| 18 | Peter DeBoer * | 672 | 456 | 0 | 156 | 1,284 | New York Islanders | 2026-present | 10 | 9 | – | 4 |
| 19 | Dave Tippett | 648 | 475 | 28 | 134 | 1,285 | Dallas Stars | 2002–2009 | 271 | 156 | 28 | 37 |
| 19 | Dave Tippett | 648 | 475 | 28 | 134 | 1,285 | Phoenix / Arizona Coyotes | 2009–2017 | 282 | 257 | – | 83 |
| 19 | Dave Tippett | 648 | 475 | 28 | 134 | 1,285 | Edmonton Oilers | 2019–2022 | 95 | 62 | – | 14 |
| 19 | Ron Wilson | 648 | 561 | 101 | 91 | 1,401 | Mighty Ducks of Anaheim | 1993–1997 | 120 | 145 | 31 | – |
| 19 | Ron Wilson | 648 | 561 | 101 | 91 | 1,401 | Washington Capitals | 1997–2002 | 192 | 159 | 51 | 8 |
| 19 | Ron Wilson | 648 | 561 | 101 | 91 | 1,401 | San Jose Sharks | 2002–2008 | 206 | 122 | 19 | 38 |
| 19 | Ron Wilson | 648 | 561 | 101 | 91 | 1,401 | Toronto Maple Leafs | 2008–2012 | 130 | 135 | – | 45 |
| 21 | Jacques Martin | 639 | 507 | 119 | 85 | 1,350 | St. Louis Blues | 1986–1988 | 66 | 71 | 23 | – |
| 21 | Jacques Martin | 639 | 507 | 119 | 85 | 1,350 | Ottawa Senators | 1996–2004, 2023–2024 | 367 | 261 | 96 | 24 |
| 21 | Jacques Martin | 639 | 507 | 119 | 85 | 1,350 | Florida Panthers | 2005–2008 | 110 | 100 | – | 36 |
| 21 | Jacques Martin | 639 | 507 | 119 | 85 | 1,350 | Montreal Canadiens | 2009–2012 | 96 | 75 | – | 25 |
| 22 | Jon Cooper * | 635 | 337 | 0 | 91 | 1,063 | Tampa Bay Lightning | 2013–present | 635 | 337 | – | 91 |
| 23 | Bryan Murray | 620 | 465 | 131 | 23 | 1,239 | Washington Capitals | 1981–1990 | 343 | 246 | 83 | – |
| 23 | Bryan Murray | 620 | 465 | 131 | 23 | 1,239 | Detroit Red Wings | 1990–1993 | 124 | 91 | 29 | – |
| 23 | Bryan Murray | 620 | 465 | 131 | 23 | 1,239 | Florida Panthers | 1997–1998 | 17 | 31 | 11 | – |
| 23 | Bryan Murray | 620 | 465 | 131 | 23 | 1,239 | Mighty Ducks of Anaheim | 2001–2002 | 29 | 42 | 8 | 3 |
| 23 | Bryan Murray | 620 | 465 | 131 | 23 | 1,239 | Ottawa Senators | 2005–2008 | 107 | 55 | – | 20 |
| 24 | Bruce Boudreau | 617 | 342 | 0 | 128 | 1,087 | Washington Capitals | 2007–2011 | 201 | 88 | – | 40 |
| 24 | Bruce Boudreau | 617 | 342 | 0 | 128 | 1,087 | Anaheim Ducks | 2011–2016 | 208 | 104 | – | 40 |
| 24 | Bruce Boudreau | 617 | 342 | 0 | 128 | 1,087 | Minnesota Wild | 2016–2020 | 158 | 110 | – | 35 |
| 24 | Bruce Boudreau | 617 | 342 | 0 | 128 | 1,087 | Vancouver Canucks | 2021–2023 | 50 | 40 | – | 13 |
| 24 | Jacques Lemaire ~ | 617 | 458 | 124 | 63 | 1,262 | Montreal Canadiens | 1984–1985 | 48 | 37 | 12 | – |
| 24 | Jacques Lemaire ~ | 617 | 458 | 124 | 63 | 1,262 | New Jersey Devils | 1993–1998, 2010–2011 | 276 | 166 | 57 | 10 |
| 24 | Jacques Lemaire ~ | 617 | 458 | 124 | 63 | 1,262 | Minnesota Wild | 2000–2009 | 293 | 255 | 55 | 53 |
| 26 | Marc Crawford | 556 | 431 | 103 | 79 | 1,169 | Quebec Nordiques | 1994–1995 | 30 | 13 | 5 | – |
| 26 | Marc Crawford | 556 | 431 | 103 | 79 | 1,169 | Colorado Avalanche | 1995–1998 | 135 | 75 | 36 | – |
| 26 | Marc Crawford | 556 | 431 | 103 | 79 | 1,169 | Vancouver Canucks | 1999–2006 | 246 | 189 | 62 | 32 |
| 26 | Marc Crawford | 556 | 431 | 103 | 79 | 1,169 | Los Angeles Kings | 2006–2008 | 59 | 84 | – | 21 |
| 26 | Marc Crawford | 556 | 431 | 103 | 79 | 1,169 | Dallas Stars | 2009–2011 | 79 | 60 | – | 25 |
| 26 | Marc Crawford | 556 | 431 | 103 | 79 | 1,169 | Ottawa Senators | 2019 | 7 | 10 | – | 1 |
| 27 | Billy Reay | 542 | 385 | 175 | 0 | 1,102 | Toronto Maple Leafs | 1957–1958 | 26 | 50 | 14 | – |
| 27 | Billy Reay | 542 | 385 | 175 | 0 | 1,102 | Chicago Black Hawks | 1963–1976 | 516 | 335 | 161 | – |
| 28 | Mike Sullivan | 513 | 350 | 15 | 121 | 999 | Boston Bruins | 2003–2006 | 70 | 56 | 15 | 23 |
| 28 | Mike Sullivan | 513 | 350 | 15 | 121 | 999 | Pittsburgh Penguins | 2015–2025 | 409 | 255 | – | 89 |
| 28 | Mike Sullivan | 513 | 350 | 15 | 121 | 999 | New York Rangers | 2025–present | 34 | 39 | – | 9 |
| 29 | Pat Burns † | 501 | 353 | 151 | 14 | 1,019 | Montreal Canadiens | 1988–1992 | 174 | 104 | 42 | – |
| 29 | Pat Burns † | 501 | 353 | 151 | 14 | 1,019 | Toronto Maple Leafs | 1992–1996 | 133 | 107 | 41 | – |
| 29 | Pat Burns † | 501 | 353 | 151 | 14 | 1,019 | Boston Bruins | 1997–2000 | 105 | 97 | 46 | 6 |
| 29 | Pat Burns † | 501 | 353 | 151 | 14 | 1,019 | New Jersey Devils | 2002–2004 | 89 | 45 | 22 | 8 |
| 30 | Toe Blake † | 500 | 255 | 159 | 0 | 914 | Montreal Canadiens | 1955–1968 | 500 | 255 | 159 | – |
| 31 | Terry Murray | 499 | 383 | 89 | 41 | 1,012 | Washington Capitals | 1989–1994 | 163 | 134 | 28 | |
| 31 | Terry Murray | 499 | 383 | 89 | 41 | 1,012 | Philadelphia Flyers | 1994–1997 | 118 | 64 | 30 | |
| 31 | Terry Murray | 499 | 383 | 89 | 41 | 1,012 | Florida Panthers | 1998–2001 | 79 | 79 | 31 | 11 |
| 31 | Terry Murray | 499 | 383 | 89 | 41 | 1,012 | Los Angeles Kings | 2008–2011 | 139 | 106 | | 30 |
| 32 | Glen Sather † | 497 | 307 | 121 | 7 | 932 (Note: Sather coached the Edmonton Oilers from 1976 to 1979 in the World Hockey Association. The NHL considers the Oilers to have joined the league as being an expansion franchise in 1979. In the WHA, the Oilers went 95–76–7 under Sather, thereby making him 592–383–128–7 in 1,110 games coached as a professional head coach.) | Edmonton Oilers | 1979–1989, 1993–1994 | 464 | 268 | 110 | 0 |
| 32 | Glen Sather † | 497 | 307 | 121 | 7 | 932 | New York Rangers | 2003–2004 | 33 | 39 | 11 | 7 |
| 33 | Randy Carlyle | 475 | 334 | 0 | 115 | 924 | Mighty Ducks of Anaheim / Anaheim Ducks | 2005–2011, 2016–2019 | 384 | 256 | | 96 |
| 33 | Randy Carlyle | 475 | 334 | 0 | 115 | 924 | Toronto Maple Leafs | 2012–2015 | 91 | 78 | | 19 |
| 34 | Bruce Cassidy * | 470 | 254 | 9 | 96 | 829 | Washington Capitals | 2002–2004 | 47 | 47 | 9 | 7 |
| 34 | Bruce Cassidy * | 470 | 254 | 9 | 96 | 829 | Boston Bruins | 2017–2022 | 245 | 108 | – | 46 |
| 34 | Bruce Cassidy * | 470 | 254 | 9 | 96 | 829 | Vegas Golden Knights | 2022–2026 | 178 | 99 | – | 43 |
| 35 | Bob Hartley | 463 | 361 | 61 | 59 | 944 | Colorado Avalanche | 1998–2002 | 193 | 108 | 48 | 10 |
| 35 | Bob Hartley | 463 | 361 | 61 | 59 | 944 | Atlanta Thrashers | 2003–2007 | 136 | 118 | 13 | 24 |
| 35 | Bob Hartley | 463 | 361 | 61 | 59 | 944 | Calgary Flames | 2012–2016 | 134 | 135 | | 25 |
| 36 | Roger Neilson † | 460 | 378 | 159 | 3 | 1,000 | Toronto Maple Leafs | 1977–1979 | 75 | 62 | 23 | |
| 36 | Roger Neilson † | 460 | 378 | 159 | 3 | 1,000 | Buffalo Sabres | 1980–1981 | 39 | 20 | 21 | |
| 36 | Roger Neilson † | 460 | 378 | 159 | 3 | 1,000 | Vancouver Canucks | 1982–1984 | 51 | 61 | 21 | |
| 36 | Roger Neilson † | 460 | 378 | 159 | 3 | 1,000 | Los Angeles Kings | 1983–1984 | 8 | 17 | 3 | |
| 36 | Roger Neilson † | 460 | 378 | 159 | 3 | 1,000 | New York Rangers | 1989–1993 | 141 | 104 | 35 | |
| 36 | Roger Neilson † | 460 | 378 | 159 | 3 | 1,000 | Florida Panthers | 1993–1995 | 53 | 56 | 23 | |
| 36 | Roger Neilson † | 460 | 378 | 159 | 3 | 1,000 | Philadelphia Flyers | 1998–2000 | 92 | 57 | 33 | 3 |
| 36 | Roger Neilson † | 460 | 378 | 159 | 3 | 1,000 | Ottawa Senators | 2002 | 1 | 1 | 0 | 0 |
| 37 | Brian Sutter | 451 | 417 | 140 | 20 | 1,028 | St. Louis Blues | 1988–1992 | 153 | 124 | 43 | |
| 37 | Brian Sutter | 451 | 417 | 140 | 20 | 1,028 | Boston Bruins | 1992–1995 | 120 | 73 | 23 | |
| 37 | Brian Sutter | 451 | 417 | 140 | 20 | 1,028 | Calgary Flames | 1997–2000 | 87 | 117 | 37 | 5 |
| 37 | Brian Sutter | 451 | 417 | 140 | 20 | 1,028 | Chicago Blackhawks | 2001–2004 | 91 | 103 | 37 | 15 |
| 38 | Jared Bednar * | 445 | 262 | 0 | 75 | 782 | Colorado Avalanche | 2016–present | 445 | 262 | 0 | 75 |
| 39 | Jack Adams | 413 | 390 | 161 | 0 | 964 | Detroit Red Wings | 1927–1947 | 413 | 390 | 161 | 0 |
| 40 | Jacques Demers | 409 | 468 | 130 | 0 | 1,007 (Note: Demers also coached 311 games in the World Hockey Association for the Indianapolis Racers, Cincinnati Stingers, and the Quebec Nordiques; he went 144–145–22 in the league that merged with the NHL in 1979, where Demers coached both the last WHA season for Quebec and the first NHL season for Quebec.) | Quebec Nordiques | 1979–1980 | 25 | 44 | 11 | |
| 40 | Jacques Demers | 409 | 468 | 130 | 0 | 1,007 | St. Louis Blues | 1983–1986 | 106 | 106 | 28 | |
| 40 | Jacques Demers | 409 | 468 | 130 | 0 | 1,007 | Detroit Red Wings | 1986–1990 | 137 | 136 | 47 | |
| 40 | Jacques Demers | 409 | 468 | 130 | 0 | 1,007 | Montreal Canadiens | 1992–1995 | 107 | 86 | 27 | |
| 40 | Jacques Demers | 409 | 468 | 130 | 0 | 1,007 | Tampa Bay Lightning | 1997–1999 | 34 | 96 | 17 | |
| 41 | John Hynes * | 409 | 333 | 0 | 87 | 829 | New Jersey Devils | 2015–2019 | 150 | 159 | | 45 |
| 41 | John Hynes * | 409 | 333 | 0 | 87 | 829 | Nashville Predators | 2020–2023 | 134 | 96 | | 18 |
| 41 | John Hynes * | 409 | 333 | 0 | 87 | 829 | Minnesota Wild | 2023–present | 125 | 78 | | 24 |
| 42 | Michel Therrien | 406 | 303 | 23 | 82 | 814 | Montreal Canadiens | 2000–2003, 2012–2017 | 271 | 198 | 23 | 50 |
| 42 | Michel Therrien | 406 | 303 | 23 | 82 | 814 | Pittsburgh Penguins | 2005–2009 | 135 | 105 | | 32 |
| 43 | Punch Imlach † | 402 | 337 | 150 | 0 | 889 | Toronto Maple Leafs | 1958–1969, 1980 | 370 | 275 | 125 | |
| 43 | Punch Imlach † | 402 | 337 | 150 | 0 | 889 | Buffalo Sabres | 1970–1972 | 32 | 62 | 25 | |
| 44 | Art Ross † | 394 | 313 | 95 | 0 | 802 | Montreal Wanderers | 1917–1918 | 1 | 5 | 0 | |
| 44 | Art Ross † | 394 | 313 | 95 | 0 | 802 | Hamilton Tigers | 1922–1923 | 6 | 18 | 0 | |
| 44 | Art Ross † | 394 | 313 | 95 | 0 | 802 | Boston Bruins | 1924–1934, 1936–1939, 1941–1945 | 387 | 290 | 95 | |
| 45 | Fred Shero † | 390 | 225 | 119 | 0 | 734 | Philadelphia Flyers | 1971–1978 | 308 | 151 | 95 | |
| 45 | Fred Shero † | 390 | 225 | 119 | 0 | 734 | New York Rangers | 1978–1980 | 82 | 74 | 24 | |
| 46 | Emile Francis † | 388 | 273 | 117 | 0 | 778 | New York Rangers | 1967–1975 | 342 | 209 | 103 | |
| 46 | Emile Francis † | 388 | 273 | 117 | 0 | 778 | St. Louis Blues | 1976–77, 1981–1982, 1982–1983 | 46 | 64 | 14 | |
| 47 | Bob Berry | 384 | 355 | 121 | 0 | 860 | Los Angeles Kings | 1978–1981 | 107 | 94 | 39 | |
| 47 | Bob Berry | 384 | 355 | 121 | 0 | 860 | Montreal Canadiens | 1981–1984 | 116 | 71 | 36 | |
| 47 | Bob Berry | 384 | 355 | 121 | 0 | 860 | Pittsburgh Penguins | 1984–1987 | 88 | 127 | 25 | |
| 47 | Bob Berry | 384 | 355 | 121 | 0 | 860 | St. Louis Blues | 1992–1994 | 73 | 63 | 21 | |
| 48 | Sid Abel ~ | 382 | 427 | 155 | 0 | 964 | Chicago Black Hawks | 1952–1954 | 39 | 79 | 22 | |
| 48 | Sid Abel ~ | 382 | 427 | 155 | 0 | 964 | Detroit Red Wings | 1957–1968, 1969–1970 | 340 | 339 | 132 | |
| 48 | Sid Abel ~ | 382 | 427 | 155 | 0 | 964 | St. Louis Blues | 1971 | 3 | 6 | 1 | |
| 48 | Sid Abel ~ | 382 | 427 | 155 | 0 | 964 | Kansas City Scouts | 1976 | 0 | 3 | 0 | |
| 49 | Rod Brind'Amour * | 378 | 182 | 0 | 56 | 616 | Carolina Hurricanes | 2018–present | 378 | 182 | 0 | 56 |
| 50 | Gerard Gallant | 369 | 262 | 4 | 70 | 705 | Columbus Blue Jackets | 2003–2007 | 56 | 76 | 4 | 6 |
| 50 | Gerard Gallant | 369 | 262 | 4 | 70 | 705 | Florida Panthers | 2014–2017 | 96 | 65 | | 25 |
| 50 | Gerard Gallant | 369 | 262 | 4 | 70 | 705 | Vegas Golden Knights | 2017–2020 | 118 | 75 | | 20 |
| 50 | Gerard Gallant | 369 | 262 | 4 | 70 | 705 | New York Rangers | 2021–2023 | 99 | 46 | | 19 |
| 51 | Craig Berube * | 365 | 252 | 0 | 90 | 707 | Philadelphia Flyers | 2013–2015 | 75 | 58 | | 28 |
| 51 | Craig Berube * | 365 | 252 | 0 | 90 | 707 | St. Louis Blues | 2018–2023 | 206 | 132 | | 44 |
| 51 | Craig Berube * | 365 | 252 | 0 | 90 | 707 | Toronto Maple Leafs | 2024–present | 84 | 62 | | 18 |
| 52 | Bob Pulford | 363 | 330 | 136 | 0 | 829 | Los Angeles Kings | 1972–1977 | 178 | 150 | 68 | |
| 52 | Bob Pulford | 363 | 330 | 136 | 0 | 829 | Chicago Blackhawks | 1977–1979, 1982, 1985–1987, 1999–2000 | 128 | 119 | 48 | |
| 53 | Dan Bylsma | 355 | 231 | 0 | 61 | 647 | Pittsburgh Penguins | 2009–2014 | 252 | 117 | | 32 |
| 53 | Dan Bylsma | 355 | 231 | 0 | 61 | 647 | Buffalo Sabres | 2015–2017 | 68 | 73 | | 23 |
| 53 | Dan Bylsma | 355 | 231 | 0 | 61 | 647 | Seattle Kraken | 2024–2025 | 35 | 41 | | 6 |
| 54 | Michel Bergeron | 338 | 350 | 104 | 0 | 792 | Quebec Nordiques | 1980–1987, 1989–1990 | 265 | 283 | 86 | |
| 54 | Michel Bergeron | 338 | 350 | 104 | 0 | 792 | New York Rangers | 1987–1989 | 73 | 67 | 18 | |
| 55 | Andy Murray | 333 | 277 | 58 | 70 | 738 | Los Angeles Kings | 1999–2006 | 215 | 175 | 58 | 32 |
| 55 | Andy Murray | 333 | 277 | 58 | 70 | 738 | St. Louis Blues | 2006–2010 | 118 | 102 | | 38 |
| 56 | Rick Bowness * | 331 | 419 | 48 | 42 | 840 | Winnipeg Jets | 1989 | 8 | 17 | 3 | |
| 56 | Rick Bowness * | 331 | 419 | 48 | 42 | 840 | Boston Bruins | 1991–1992 | 36 | 32 | 12 | |
| 56 | Rick Bowness * | 331 | 419 | 48 | 42 | 840 | Ottawa Senators | 1992–1995 | 39 | 178 | 18 | |
| 56 | Rick Bowness * | 331 | 419 | 48 | 42 | 840 | New York Islanders | 1997–1998 | 38 | 50 | 12 | |
| 56 | Rick Bowness * | 331 | 419 | 48 | 42 | 840 | Phoenix Coyotes | 2004 | 2 | 12 | 3 | 3 |
| 56 | Rick Bowness * | 331 | 419 | 48 | 42 | 840 | Dallas Stars | 2019–2022 | 89 | 62 | | 25 |
| 56 | Rick Bowness * | 331 | 419 | 48 | 42 | 840 | Winnipeg Jets | 2022–2024 | 98 | 57 | | 9 |
| 56 | Rick Bowness * | 331 | 419 | 48 | 42 | 840 | Columbus Blue Jackets | 2026–present | 21 | 11 | | 5 |
| 57 | Rick Tocchet * | 329 | 292 | | 99 | 720 | Tampa Bay Lightning | 2008-2010 | 53 | 69 | | 26 |
| 57 | Rick Tocchet * | 329 | 292 | | 99 | 720 | Arizona Coyotes | 2017-2021 | 125 | 131 | | 34 |
| 57 | Rick Tocchet * | 329 | 292 | | 99 | 720 | Vancouver Canucks | 2022-2025 | 108 | 65 | | 27 |
| 57 | Rick Tocchet * | 329 | 292 | | 99 | 720 | Philadelphia Flyers | 2025-present | 43 | 27 | | 12 |
| 58 | Craig MacTavish | 301 | 252 | 47 | 56 | 656 | Edmonton Oilers | 2000–2009 | 301 | 252 | 47 | 56 |

== Points percentage ==
Coaches included have coached at least 200 games – around 2.5 full seasons and a group including 186 coaches – and points percentage of at least .540. Note that the total number of games listed for each coach in the table includes wins (2 points), losses (0 points), ties (1 point, now defunct) and overtime losses (1 point, currently used). The lowest points percentage for a qualifying coach is Curt Fraser: 174 points (64–169–31–15) in 279 games.

| Rank | Name | Point Pct. | Games Coached | Points | Wins | Losses | Ties | OTL |
|---|---|---|---|---|---|---|---|---|
| 1 | Tom Johnson | .738 | 208 | 307 | 142 | 43 | 23 | 0 |
| 2 | Rod Brind'Amour | .659 | 616 | 812 | 378 | 182 | 0 | 56 |
| 3 | Scotty Bowman† | .657 | 2,141 | 2,812 | 1,244 | 573 | 314 | 10 |
| 4 | Claude Ruel | .648 | 305 | 395 | 172 | 82 | 51 | 0 |
| 5 | Jon Cooper | .639 | 1043 | 1,333 | 622 | 332 | 0 | 89 |
| 6 | Toe Blake† | .634 | 914 | 1,159 | 500 | 255 | 159 | 0 |
| 7 | Jim Montgomery | .632 | 440 | 556 | 252 | 134 | 0 | 52 |
| 8 | Bruce Cassidy | .630 | 829 | 1,045 | 470 | 254 | 9 | 96 |
| 9 | Bruce Boudreau | .626 | 1,087 | 1,362 | 617 | 342 | 0 | 128 |
| 10 | Sheldon Keefe | .626 | 513 | 642 | 296 | 167 | 0 | 50 |
| 11 | Floyd Smith | .626 | 309 | 387 | 173 | 95 | 41 | 0 |
| 12 | Kris Knoblauch | .624 | 233 | 291 | 135 | 77 | 0 | 21 |
| 13 | Jared Bednar | .617 | 782 | 965 | 445 | 262 | 0 | 75 |
| 14 | Fred Shero† | .612 | 734 | 899 | 390 | 225 | 119 | 0 |
| 15 | Joel Quenneville | .610 | 1,850 | 2,257 | 1,012 | 605 | 77 | 156 |
| 16 | Mike Babcock | .608 | 1,301 | 1,583 | 700 | 418 | 19 | 164 |
| 17 | Spencer Carbery | .604 | 246 | 297 | 134 | 83 | 0 | 29 |
| 18 | Gerry Cheevers | .604 | 376 | 454 | 204 | 126 | 46 | 0 |
| 19 | Dave Lewis | .604 | 251 | 303 | 135 | 83 | 21 | 12 |
| 20 | Dean Evason | .602 | 378 | 455 | 206 | 129 | 0 | 43 |
| 21 | Glen Sather† | .602 | 932 | 1,122 | 497 | 307 | 121 | 7 |
| 22 | Don Cherry | .601 | 480 | 577 | 250 | 153 | 77 | 0 |
| 23 | Ken Hitchcock† | .599 | 1,598 | 1,913 | 849 | 534 | 88 | 127 |
| 24 | Tommy Ivan† | .599 | 573 | 687 | 288 | 174 | 111 | 0 |
| 25 | Dan Bylsma | .596 | 647 | 771 | 355 | 231 | 0 | 61 |
| 26 | Jimmy Skinner | .591 | 247 | 292 | 123 | 78 | 46 | 0 |
| 27 | Cecil Hart | .590 | 394 | 465 | 196 | 125 | 73 | 0 |
| 28 | Guy Carbonneau | .589 | 230 | 271 | 124 | 83 | 0 | 23 |
| 29 | Peter Laviolette | .589 | 1,594 | 1,878 | 846 | 562 | 25 | 161 |
| 30 | Robbie Ftorek | .587 | 443 | 520 | 229 | 152 | 44 | 18 |
| 31 | Claude Julien | .587 | 1,274 | 1,496 | 667 | 445 | 10 | 152 |
| 32 | Alain Vigneault | .585 | 1,363 | 1,596 | 722 | 489 | 35 | 117 |
| 33 | Peter DeBoer | .584 | 1,265 | 1,478 | 663 | 450 | 0 | 152 |
| 34 | Brent Sutter | .584 | 410 | 479 | 215 | 146 | 0 | 49 |
| 35 | Mike Sullivan | .582 | 999 | 1,162 | 513 | 350 | 15 | 121 |
| 36 | Craig Berube | .580 | 707 | 820 | 365 | 252 | 0 | 90 |
| 37 | Todd McLellan | .580 | 1,274 | 1,478 | 665 | 461 | 0 | 148 |
| 38 | Randy Carlyle | .576 | 924 | 1,065 | 475 | 334 | 0 | 115 |
| 39 | Gerard Gallant | .576 | 705 | 812 | 369 | 262 | 4 | 70 |
| 40 | Emile Francis† | .574 | 778 | 893 | 388 | 273 | 117 | 0 |
| 41 | Pat Burns† | .573 | 1,019 | 1,167 | 501 | 353 | 151 | 14 |
| 42 | Billy Reay | .571 | 1,102 | 1,259 | 542 | 385 | 175 | 0 |
| 43 | Darryl Sutter | .570 | 1,479 | 1,686 | 737 | 530 | 101 | 111 |
| 44 | Red Berenson | .569 | 204 | 232 | 100 | 72 | 32 | 0 |
| 45 | Glen Gulutzan | .568 | 376 | 427 | 196 | 145 | 0 | 35 |
| 46 | Dave Tippett | .567 | 1,285 | 1,458 | 648 | 475 | 28 | 134 |
| 47 | Barry Trotz | .567 | 1,812 | 2,056 | 914 | 670 | 60 | 168 |
| 48 | Al Arbour† | .564 | 1,607 | 1,812 | 782 | 577 | 248 | 0 |
| 49 | Terry O'Reilly | .564 | 227 | 256 | 115 | 86 | 26 | 0 |
| 50 | Patrick Roy | .564 | 443 | 500 | 227 | 170 | 0 | 46 |
| 51 | Jacques Lemaire | .563 | 1,262 | 1,421 | 617 | 458 | 124 | 63 |
| 52 | Bryan Murray | .563 | 1,239 | 1,394 | 620 | 465 | 131 | 23 |
| 53 | Michel Therrien | .563 | 814 | 917 | 406 | 303 | 23 | 82 |
| 54 | Andrew Brunette | .562 | 321 | 361 | 166 | 126 | 0 | 29 |
| 55 | Joe Primeau† | .562 | 210 | 236 | 97 | 71 | 42 | 0 |
| 56 | Tony Granato | .560 | 215 | 241 | 104 | 78 | 17 | 16 |
| 57 | Dick Irvin† | .557 | 1,449 | 1,614 | 692 | 527 | 230 | 0 |
| 58 | Terry Murray | .557 | 1,012 | 1,128 | 499 | 383 | 89 | 41 |
| 59 | Harry Sinden† | .557 | 327 | 364 | 153 | 116 | 58 | 0 |
| 60 | Jean Perron | .556 | 287 | 319 | 142 | 110 | 35 | 0 |
| 61 | Pat Quinn† | .556 | 1,400 | 1,556 | 684 | 528 | 154 | 34 |
| 62 | Bob Hartley | .554 | 944 | 1,046 | 463 | 361 | 61 | 59 |
| 63 | Lester Patrick† | .554 | 604 | 669 | 281 | 216 | 107 | 0 |
| 64 | Lindy Ruff | .554 | 1,938 | 2,147 | 950 | 741 | 78 | 169 |
| 65 | Marc Crawford | .553 | 1,169 | 1,294 | 556 | 431 | 103 | 79 |
| 66 | Mike Keenan | .551 | 1,386 | 1,527 | 672 | 531 | 147 | 36 |
| 67 | Paul MacLean | .550 | 239 | 263 | 114 | 90 | 0 | 35 |
| 68 | Art Ross† | .550 | 802 | 883 | 394 | 313 | 95 | 0 |
| 69 | Hap Day† | .549 | 546 | 599 | 259 | 206 | 81 | 0 |
| 70 | Jacques Martin | .549 | 1,350 | 1,482 | 639 | 507 | 119 | 85 |
| 71 | Fred Creighton | .548 | 421 | 461 | 196 | 156 | 69 | 0 |
| 72 | Bob Johnson† | .548 | 480 | 526 | 234 | 188 | 58 | 0 |
| 73 | John Hynes | .546 | 829 | 905 | 409 | 333 | 0 | 87 |
| 74 | Mike Yeo | .542 | 542 | 588 | 263 | 217 | 0 | 62 |
| 75 | Al MacNeil | .541 | 306 | 331 | 138 | 113 | 55 | 0 |
| 76 | Roger Neilson† | .541 | 1,000 | 1,082 | 460 | 378 | 159 | 3 |
| 77 | John Tortorella | .540 | 1,628 | 1,757 | 777 | 648 | 37 | 166 |

== Stanley Cup playoff wins ==
The following is a list of all-time Stanley Cup playoffs win-loss records for coaches with at least 40 wins. Please note that ties are included, as 48 playoff games in history have ended in a tie.

| Coach | Playoff games | Wins | Losses | Ties | Pct. | Stanley Cup championships | Stanley Cup Final appearances |
|---|---|---|---|---|---|---|---|
| Scotty Bowman† | 353 | 223 | 130 | 0 | .632 | 9 | 13 |
| Joel Quenneville | 237 | 127 | 110 | 0 | .536 | 3 | 3 |
| Al Arbour† | 209 | 123 | 86 | 0 | .589 | 4 | 5 |
| Dick Irvin† | 190 | 100 | 88 | 2 | .532 | 4 | 10 |
| Peter DeBoer | 179 | 97 | 82 | 0 | .542 | 0 | 2 |
| Mike Keenan | 173 | 96 | 77 | 0 | .555 | 1 | 4 |
| Pat Quinn† | 183 | 94 | 89 | 0 | .514 | 0 | 2 |
| Darryl Sutter | 182 | 94 | 88 | 0 | .516 | 2 | 3 |
| Jon Cooper | 162 | 91 | 71 | 0 | .562 | 2 | 4 |
| Mike Babcock | 164 | 90 | 74 | 0 | .549 | 1 | 3 |
| Glen Sather† | 127 | 89 | 37 | 1 | .705 | 4 | 5 |
| Peter Laviolette | 170 | 88 | 82 | 0 | .518 | 1 | 3 |
| Ken Hitchcock† | 168 | 86 | 82 | 0 | .512 | 1 | 2 |
| Paul Maurice | 160 | 86 | 74 | 0 | .538 | 2 | 4 |
| Barry Trotz | 162 | 83 | 79 | 0 | .512 | 1 | 1 |
| Toe Blake† | 119 | 82 | 37 | 0 | .689 | 8 | 9 |
| Lindy Ruff | 145 | 78 | 67 | 0 | .538 | 0 | 1 |
| Pat Burns† | 149 | 78 | 71 | 0 | .523 | 1 | 2 |
| Alain Vigneault | 155 | 78 | 77 | 0 | .503 | 0 | 2 |
| John Tortorella | 142 | 70 | 72 | 0 | .493 | 1 | 2 |
| Claude Julien | 125 | 68 | 56 | 0 | .544 | 1 | 1 |
| Rod Brind'Amour | 108 | 63 | 45 | 0 | .583 | 1 | 1 |
| Fred Shero† | 110 | 63 | 47 | 0 | .573 | 2 | 4 |
| Bruce Cassidy | 119 | 62 | 57 | 0 | .521 | 1 | 2 |
| Jacques Lemaire | 117 | 61 | 56 | 0 | .521 | 1 | 1 |
| Jared Bednar | 101 | 60 | 41 | 0 | .594 | 1 | 1 |
| Billy Reay | 117 | 57 | 60 | 0 | .487 | 0 | 3 |
| Jacques Demers | 98 | 55 | 43 | 0 | .561 | 1 | 1 |
| Bob Hartley | 95 | 54 | 41 | 0 | .568 | 1 | 1 |
| Jack Adams† | 105 | 52 | 52 | 1 | .500 | 3 | 7 |
| Bryan Murray | 112 | 52 | 60 | 0 | .464 | 0 | 1 |
| Roger Neilson† | 106 | 51 | 55 | 0 | .481 | 0 | 1 |
| Jacques Martin | 111 | 50 | 61 | 0 | .450 | 0 | 0 |
| Terry Murray | 101 | 50 | 51 | 0 | .495 | 0 | 1 |
| Randy Carlyle | 90 | 49 | 41 | 0 | .544 | 1 | 1 |
| Hap Day† | 80 | 49 | 31 | 0 | .613 | 5 | 5 |
| Mike Sullivan | 89 | 47 | 42 | 0 | .528 | 2 | 2 |
| Ron Wilson | 95 | 47 | 48 | 0 | .495 | 0 | 1 |
| Punch Imlach† | 92 | 44 | 48 | 0 | .478 | 4 | 6 |
| Bruce Boudreau | 90 | 43 | 47 | 0 | .478 | 0 | 0 |
| Dan Bylsma | 78 | 43 | 35 | 0 | .551 | 1 | 1 |
| Marc Crawford | 83 | 43 | 40 | 0 | .518 | 1 | 1 |
| Todd McLellan | 88 | 42 | 46 | 0 | .477 | 0 | 0 |
| Bob Johnson† | 76 | 41 | 35 | 0 | .539 | 1 | 2 |
