= Billy Reay =

Canadian ice hockey player and coach

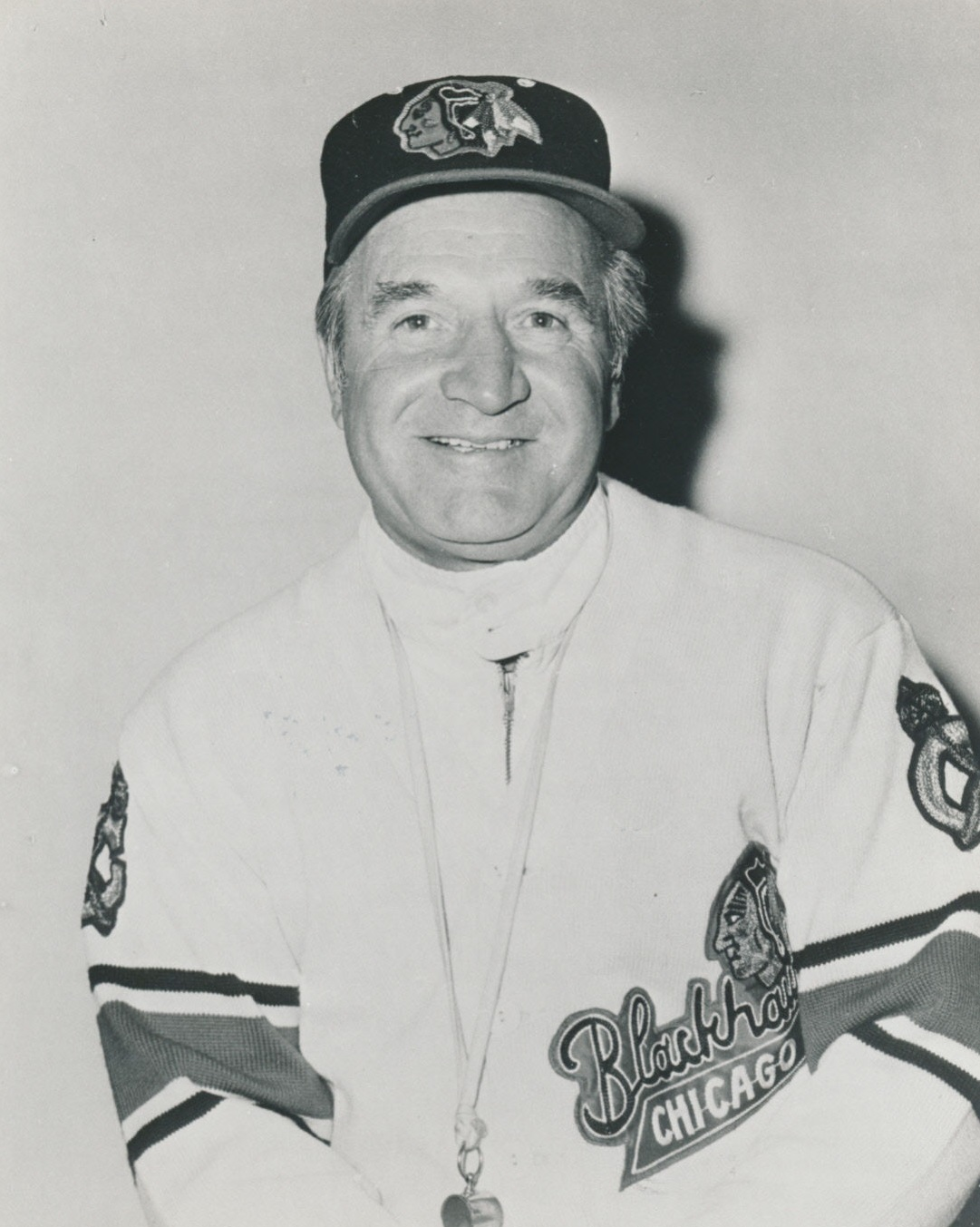
- Reay in 1973
- Born: August 21, 1918 Winnipeg, Manitoba, Canada
- Died: September 23, 2004 (aged 86) Madison, Wisconsin, U.S.
- Height: 5 ft 7 in (170 cm)
- Weight: 155 lb (70 kg; 11 st 1 lb)
- Position: Centre
- Shot: Left
- Played for: Detroit Red Wings; Montreal Canadiens
- Playing career: 1943–1953

William Tulip Reay (August 21, 1918 – September 23, 2004) was a Canadian professional ice hockey player and coach. Reay played ten seasons in the National Hockey League (NHL) from 1943 to 1953, winning two Stanley Cups. He then coached from 1957 to 1959 in the NHL and again from 1963 to 1977, primarily with the Chicago Black Hawks, who he coached to the Stanley Cup Final three times. While he did not win a Cup as a coach, Reay won over 500 games as a head coach, and he was the second coach to win 500 games with one team. When he retired, he was second in NHL history in wins, and he currently is one of thirty coaches to have won 500 games.

== Career ==
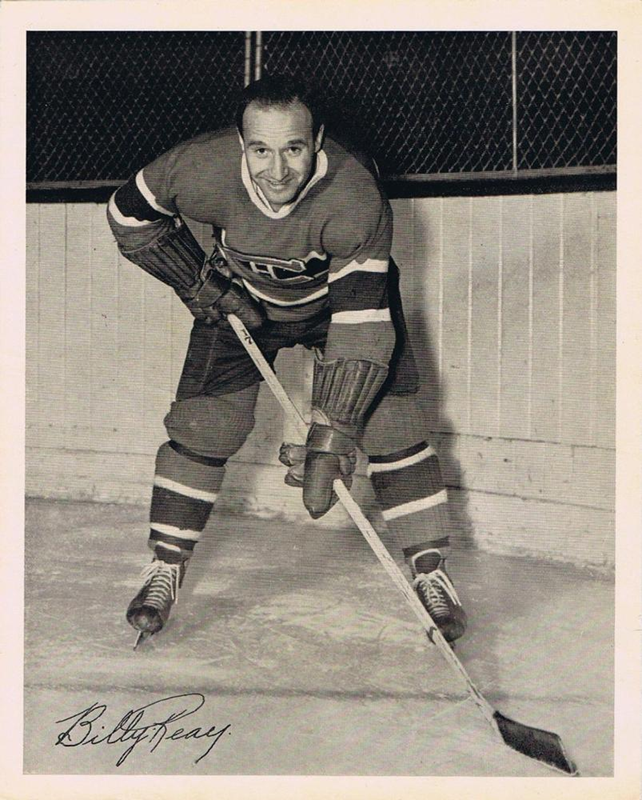
1950s photo of Reay for Montreal Canadiens

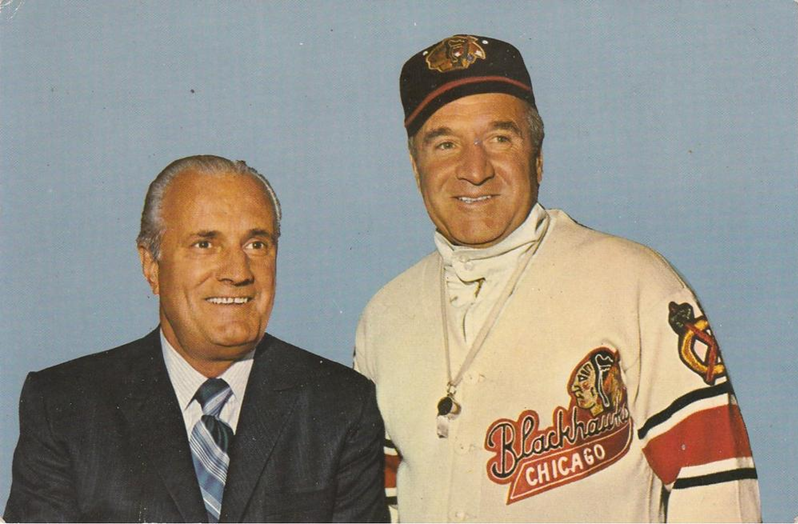
1970 photo of Reay (right) with Tommy Ivan.

Born in Winnipeg, Manitoba, Reay started playing hockey from a young age, making the St. Boniface Seals in 1937. The Detroit Red Wings signed him as a free agent in 1939. Reay was named player-coach of the Quebec Aces in the Quebec senior league in 1942 at the age of just 24. He did two seasons as player-coach and made spot appearances with the Red Wings in the NHL. Before the start of the 1945-46 season, Reay was traded for Ray Getliffe and Rolly Rossignol to the Montreal Canadiens. He would play primarily on the second line behind Elmer Lach and recorded a handful of 40-point seasons. He won the Stanley Cup two times, in 1946 and 1953, both with the Montreal Canadiens. In 479 games, he scored 105 goals and 267 points and in 63 playoff games, he scored 13 goals and 29 points, with the 1953 Stanley Cup win being his final NHL game as a player. He was player-coach for the Victoria Cougars of the Western Hockey League from 1953 to 1955 before retiring as a player to become a coach with the Seattle Americans for the 1955-56 season. He then took a job with the first-year Rochester Americans of the American Hockey League, coaching one season. He was then hired as the head coach for the Toronto Maple Leafs in 1957, which saw them finish dead-last in the six-team league. Midway through the 1958-59 season, first-year GM Punch Imlach fired Reay. He became a minor league coach in the Chicago Black Hawks system, starting with the Sault Ste. Marie Thunderbirds of the Eastern Professional Hockey League for the 1960-61 season before coaching the AHL Buffalo Bisons from 1961 to 1963, winning the Calder Cup in 1963 before being asked to succeed Rudy Pilous as head coach for Chicago, and he was hired on June 10, 1963.

Reay would stay in the position for the next fourteen years. Although he led the Black Hawks to three Stanley Cup Final (1965, 1971, and 1973), he never won the Cup. In his fourth year, 1966–67, he led the Hawks to the league's best record, the first time they had done so in their 41-year history. On Christmas Eve in 1976, Reay was fired by the team after a slow start, with Reay supposedly being fired via a note left under his door. He is the franchise's all-time leader in wins (516) and years coached (14). When he died, the Chicago Tribune described him as someone who "wasn’t one to polish apples or lick boots, either, and perhaps this is why he has been denied a place in hockey’s Hall of Fame."

Before beginning a career from which he retired with the second most victories in NHL history, Reay was a Canadiens centre who is believed to be the first player to raise his arms and stick to celebrate a goal when he did so after scoring in a game in 1947.

He died of liver cancer in Madison, Wisconsin at the age of 86.

== Career statistics ==
=== Regular season and playoffs ===
			Regular season					Playoffs
Season	Team	League	GP	G	A	Pts	PIM	GP	G	A	Pts	PIM
1936–37	St. Boniface Seals	MJHL	15	4	4	8	6	7	1	0	1	2
1937–38	St. Boniface Seals	MJHL	15	15	7	22	14	10	5	5	10	12
1938–39	Calgary Stampeders	ASHL	32	11	8	19	44	—	—	—	—	—
1939–40	Omaha Knights	AHA	48	18	20	38	23	9	6	1	7	4
1940–41	Omaha Knights	AHA	46	18	22	40	32	—	—	—	—	—
1941–42	Sydney Millionaires	CBSHL	—	—	—	—	—	—	—	—	—	—
1941–42	Quebec Aces	QSHL	1	1	0	1	0	7	1	3	4	4
1941–42	Quebec Aces	Al-Cup	—	—	—	—	—	11	6	3	9	8
1942–43	Quebec Morton Aces	QSHL	29	16	26	42	22	4	2	0	2	2
1943–44	Detroit Red Wings	NHL	2	2	0	2	0	—	—	—	—	—
1943–44	Quebec Aces	QSHL	25	15	31	46	19	5	2	7	9	2
1943–44	Quebec Aces	Al-Cup	—	—	—	—	—	9	3	9	12	0
1944–45	Detroit Red Wings	NHL	2	0	0	0	0	—	—	—	—	—
1944–45	Quebec Aces	QSHL	20	17	29	46	6	7	3	1	4	4
1944–45	Quebec Aces	Al-Cup	—	—	—	—	—	3	0	0	0	0
1945–46	Montreal Canadiens	NHL	44	17	12	29	10	9	1	2	3	4
1946–47	Montreal Canadiens	NHL	59	22	20	42	17	11	6	1	7	14
1947–48	Montreal Canadiens	NHL	60	6	14	20	24	—	—	—	—	—
1948–49	Montreal Canadiens	NHL	60	22	23	45	33	7	1	5	6	4
1949–50	Montreal Canadiens	NHL	68	19	26	45	48	4	0	1	1	0
1950–51	Montreal Canadiens	NHL	60	6	18	24	24	11	3	3	6	10
1951–52	Montreal Canadiens	NHL	68	7	34	41	20	10	2	2	4	7
1952–53	Montreal Canadiens	NHL	56	4	15	19	26	11	0	2	2	4
1953–54	Vancouver Canucks	WHL	69	10	14	24	30	5	0	0	0	2
1954–55	Vancouver Canucks	WHL	70	3	28	31	43	5	1	1	2	4
NHL totals			479	105	162	267	202	63	13	16	29	43

== Coaching record ==
Team	Year	Regular season						Postseason			
Team	Year	G	W	L	T	Pts	Finish	W	L	Win %	Result
TOR	1957–58	70	21	38	11	53	6th in NHL	—	—	—	Missed playoffs
TOR	1958–59	20	5	12	3	13	(fired)	—	—	—	—
TOR total		90	26	50	14	66		—	—	—	—
CHI	1963–64	70	36	22	12	84	2nd in NHL	3	4	.429	Lost in semifinals (DET)
CHI	1964–65	70	34	28	8	76	3rd in NHL	7	7	.500	Lost in Stanley Cup Final (MTL)
CHI	1965–66	70	37	25	8	82	2nd in NHL	2	4	.333	Lost in semifinals (DET)
CHI	1966–67	70	41	17	12	94	1st in NHL	2	4	.333	Lost in semifinals (TOR)
CHI	1967–68	74	32	26	16	80	4th in East	5	6	.455	Lost in semifinals (MTL)
CHI	1968–69	76	34	33	9	77	6th in East	—	—	—	Missed playoffs
CHI	1969–70	76	45	22	9	99	1st in East	4	4	.500	Lost in semifinals (BOS)
CHI	1970–71	78	49	20	9	107	1st in West	11	7	.611	Lost in Stanley Cup Final (MTL)
CHI	1971–72	78	46	17	15	107	1st in West	4	4	.500	Lost in semifinals (NYR)
CHI	1972–73	78	42	27	9	93	1st in West	10	6	.625	Lost in Stanley Cup Final (MTL)
CHI	1973–74	78	41	14	23	105	2nd in West	6	5	.545	Lost in semifinals (BOS)
CHI	1974–75	80	37	35	8	82	3rd in Smythe	3	5	.375	Lost in quarterfinals (BUF)
CHI	1975–76	80	32	30	18	82	1st in Smythe	0	4	.000	Lost in quarterfinals (MTL)
CHI	1976–77	34	10	19	5	25	(fired)	—	—	—	—
CHI total		1,012	516	335	161	1,193		57	60	.487	12 playoff appearances
Total		1,102	542	385	175	1,259		57	60	.487	12 playoff appearances

== Awards and achievements ==
- Turnbull Cup MJHL Championship (1938)
- Memorial Cup Championship (1938)
- Allan Cup Championship (1944)
- Stanley Cup Championships (1946 & 1953)
- Played in NHL All-Star Game (1952)
- Calder Cup (AHL) Championship (1963)
- Selected Manitoba's All-Century Second Team Coach
- Honoured Member of the Manitoba Hockey Hall of Fame

== See also ==
- List of National Hockey League head coaching wins and point percentage leaders

Preceded by Howie Meeker	Head coach of the Toronto Maple Leafs; 1957–1959	Succeeded by Punch Imlach
Preceded by Rudy Pilous	Head coach of the Chicago Black Hawks; 1963–1976	Succeeded by Bill White
