= Mike Keenan =

Canadian professional hockey coach (born 1949)

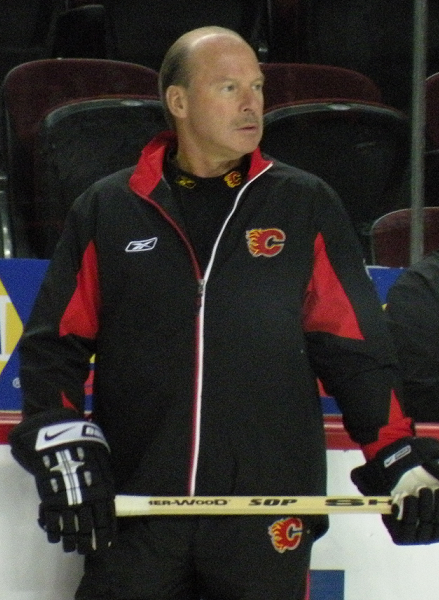
- Keenan in 2008
- Born: October 21, 1949 (age 77) Bowmanville, Ontario, Canada
- Coached for: Philadelphia Flyers; Chicago Blackhawks; New York Rangers; St. Louis Blues; Vancouver Canucks; Boston Bruins; Florida Panthers; Calgary Flames; Metallurg Magnitogorsk; Kunlun Red Star
- Coaching career: 1984–2017

Michael Edward Keenan (born October 21, 1949) is a Canadian-American former professional ice hockey coach. Previously, he served as head coach and/or general manager with several National Hockey League (NHL) teams between 1984 and 2009. He currently ranks sixth in playoff wins with 96. He is noted for his early career success in coaching, which started with reaching the Stanley Cup Final in his rookie season in 1985. In 1987, he reached the Finals once again. Months later, he led Team Canada to win the 1987 Canada Cup round-robin tournament in a thrilling best-of-three series finale against Viktor Tikhonov's Red Army team. He left the Flyers for Chicago in 1988. He reached the Finals once again in 1992 but lost again. After leaving the Blackhawks and spending a year away from coaching, Keenan won a Stanley Cup championship as coach of the New York Rangers in 1994.

He is one of three coaches to coach in a playoff game seven ten times, for which he won five times. Keenan was the third person to lead three different teams (Philadelphia, Chicago, New York) to the Stanley Cup Final; only one coach has accomplished the feat since Keenan.

Keenan coached for eight NHL teams from 1984 to 2009. He also won the Gagarin Cup while coaching Metallurg Magnitogorsk in 2014, and he became the first head coach to have won championships in both the NHL and KHL, later to be joined by Bob Hartley after his win in 2021.

Currently, he is 15th all time in NHL wins as one of 23 head coaches with 600 wins in NHL history. In each of his first eleven seasons, Keenan led his team to the Stanley Cup playoffs; in the subsequent nine seasons that followed, his teams only made it to the playoffs twice. His tough coaching style and attitude towards his players have earned him the nickname "Iron Mike".

== Coaching career ==
=== Minor hockey ===
His first coaching job was at Forest Hill Collegiate Institute in Toronto, Ontario, where he coached the varsity hockey team. In 1977 he became the coach of the Oshawa Legionaires of the Metro Junior B Hockey League, where he led them to back-to-back championships in 1979 and 1980. The following year he began his junior coaching career with the Peterborough Petes before moving on to the Rochester Americans, which he guided to the American Hockey League championship in 1983. He returned to the University of Toronto to lead it to the CIAU title.

=== NHL ===
Keenan landed his first high-profile job with the Philadelphia Flyers in 1984. From the 1988-1989 through the end of the 1991-1992 season, Keenan coached the Chicago Blackhawks, nearly to the pinnacle of hockey in 1992, losing the Stanley Cup to the Pittsburgh Penguins. His time with the Blackhawks placed a heavy emphasis on physical play, with, for example, Mike Peluso accruing a remarkable 408 PIM in only 63 games in Keenan's last year as coach. In 1993, he became the New York Rangers head coach and led the team to its first Stanley Cup win since 1940. Prior to the 1993 season, he was also a candidate for the Detroit Red Wings head coaching job that eventually went to Scotty Bowman.

The 1994 season saw Keenan become the first to coach two teams to a game seven in the Stanley Cup Finals, having previously coached the Flyers in a losing effort against the Edmonton Oilers in 1987. He was followed in this feat in 2009 by Mike Babcock of the Detroit Red Wings. In winning the 1994 Stanley Cup, Keenan managed to avoid becoming the first coach in NHL history to lose game sevens with two teams (the fate which would befall Babcock in losing to the Pittsburgh Penguins). However, he left the team one month after the series ended due to disputes with GM Neil Smith.

After leaving the Rangers, Keenan went on to serve as coach and general manager of the St. Louis Blues (1994–96), and coached the Vancouver Canucks (1997–98), and the Boston Bruins (2000–01). He was named head coach of the Florida Panthers on December 3, 2001, before becoming its general manager. On September 3, 2006, Keenan resigned his position and was replaced by head coach Jacques Martin.

On April 24, 2007, Keenan would take his next role as senior advisor to the Swedish Ice Hockey Association. This role would not last long as he was named head coach of the Calgary Flames on June 14, 2007. Keenan would go on to pass Pat Quinn for 4th on the all time NHL coach win list (648 wins) on February 12, 2009.

On May 22, 2009, after two consecutive first round playoff losses, Keenan was fired as head coach of the Calgary Flames; he had one year left on his contract. He recorded his 600th win as an NHL coach with the Flames.

=== As commentator ===
On October 1, 2009, MSG Network announced that Keenan would join the Rangers MSG Network broadcast team of Sam Rosen, Joe Micheletti, Al Trautwig, John Giannone, Dave Maloney, and Ron Duguay as a regular guest analyst for pre-game, intermission, and post-game reports on the network. He's also an analyst on MSG Hockey Night Live with Trautwig, Duguay, Maloney, Ken Daneyko, and Butch Goring.

=== KHL ===
On May 13, 2013, Keenan signed a contract with Metallurg Magnitogorsk of KHL. On April 30, 2014, Keenan's Metallurg team won the KHL championship with a game seven victory over HC Lev Praha. In winning the team's first Gagarin Cup, Keenan became both the first North American coach to win a KHL championship and the first coach to win both the Gagarin Cup and the Stanley Cup. On October 17, 2015, Keenan was fired by Magnitogorsk.

On March 16, 2017, Keenan was announced as the new head coach of HC Kunlun Red Star, the KHL's first Chinese based team. After a disappointing start to the 2017–2018 season, Keenan was fired by Kunlun Red Star on December 3, 2017.

=== International ===
On October 18, 2022, the Italian Ice Sports Federation named Keenan as the head coach of the Italian men's national ice hockey team.

== Relationship with NHL personnel and players ==
Despite Keenan's coaching record, his inability to maintain working relationships with players and team organizations has resulted in a lack of long-term coaching positions. His coaching resume includes abrupt terminations or resignations from coaching or general manager positions, sometimes at bafflingly inopportune, or peak, moments of his career.

The Philadelphia Flyers fired Keenan a year after leading them to the 1987 Stanley Cup Final, in a move that Flyers GM Bobby Clarke stated was because the team had lost "enthusiasm" for playing under Keenan. After taking the Chicago Blackhawks to the 1992 Stanley Cup Final, Keenan was forced to focus solely on his GM duties when longtime Blackhawk player and assistant coach Darryl Sutter was being courted by other teams to be their head coach. Owner Bill Wirtz did not want to lose Sutter, especially since Keenan had stated, in July 1992, that he wished to focus solely on his duties as general manager after the 92–93 season. Keenan lost a power struggle with Senior V.P. Bob Pulford after the 1992–93 season that saw him quit (whereas the team stated he resigned) and was soon hired by the New York Rangers. Keenan managed to coach the Rangers to the Stanley Cup in his first and only year as head coach, but was unable to coexist long enough with general manager Neil Smith and resigned weeks later, citing a violation of his contract by the Rangers.

Stops in St. Louis and Vancouver saw conflict with team stars; both Brett Hull and Trevor Linden had major personality conflicts with Keenan. In one instance while the Blues were playing the Buffalo Sabres at The Aud, Dale Hawerchuk's dying grandmother, who lived in nearby Fort Erie, Ontario, Canada, came to see him play one last time while she was alive. Keenan deliberately benched Hawerchuk for the game, causing irate team captain Brett Hull to scream at Keenan; Keenan responded by stripping Hull of the captaincy. He blasted Hull's play as not being a team player in the immediate time after being let go from the Blues. Another time, defenceman Grant Ledyard had to take time away to be with his wife due to her having a lump in her breast. Apparently, when he returned to call about her having a clean bill of health, Keenan (who disliked Ledyard) had spread word that Ledyard had quit on the team.

Keenan was even willing to publicly criticize Wayne Gretzky after he acquired the superstar in an early 1996 trade with the Los Angeles Kings. Keenan had previously coached Gretzky in Canada Cup play, and his refusal to moderate his attitude and style even when coaching a team full of stars meant his relationship with the league's all-time leading scorer was never particularly warm. Gretzky refused to consider re-signing with St. Louis during the 1996 off-season and opted instead to finish his playing career with Keenan's former team, the Rangers.

In September 2006, Keenan again attracted headlines when he abruptly resigned as general manager of the Florida Panthers. Keenan's resignation came shortly after he dealt Florida Panthers' franchise goaltender Roberto Luongo along with defenceman Lukas Krajicek and Florida's 2006 sixth-round draft pick (Sergei Shirokov) to the Vancouver Canucks for struggling forward Todd Bertuzzi, goaltender Alex Auld, and defenceman Bryan Allen. It was speculated that Keenan had lost a power struggle with head coach and longtime friend, Jacques Martin, over personnel decisions. Martin succeeded him as general manager upon his resignation.

He was also notorious for pulling or switching his goaltenders, sometimes multiple times in a period. Before the 1987 playoffs, he used Ron Hextall as the regular starting goalie. However, he pulled goaltenders Hextall and Chico Resch a total of five times in a single game (the fifth time to gain a man-advantage in the last minute of play) in game four of the first round of the 1987 playoffs. Three years later, he pulled goaltender Greg Millen in favor of Ed Belfour a total of four times in 8 games. That system was discontinued when he became the New York Rangers head coach and used Mike Richter as the regular starting goalie.

Goaltender Roberto Luongo said the following regarding Keenan's penchant for pulling his goaltenders while a member of the Florida Panthers in 2002:

"Not a big deal. [Keenan] does it so much that we expect it. If he's your coach and you're an NHL goalie on the bench, you have to be ready, just in case."

== Personal life and family ==
Keenan has a wife and a daughter.

Derek Keenan, the head coach and general manager of the Saskatchewan Rush of the National Lacrosse League, is Keenan's third cousin. Derek's wife, Wendy, is a sister of Hockey Hall of Famer Joe Nieuwendyk.

In 2018, Keenan went public with being diagnosed with prostate cancer, and was then undergoing treatment.

In 2024, Iron Mike: My Life Behind the Bench, an autobiography written by Keenan and Scott Morrison, was published.

== Career record ==
Regular season points (Pts) contained in brackets () denote the team's standing after the full season, not the number of points accrued at the time Keenan was fired.

=== NHL ===
Team	Year	Regular season							Post season			
Team	Year	G	W	L	T	OTL	Pts	Finish	W	L	Win %	Result
PHI	1984–85	80	53	20	7	–	113	1st in Patrick	12	7	.632	Lost in Stanley Cup Final (EDM)
PHI	1985–86	80	53	23	4	–	110	1st in Patrick	2	3	.400	Lost in Division semifinals (NYR)
PHI	1986–87	80	46	26	8	–	100	1st in Patrick	15	11	.577	Lost in Stanley Cup Final (EDM)
PHI	1987–88	80	38	33	9	–	85	3rd in Patrick	3	4	.429	Lost in Division semifinals (WSH)
PHI Total		320	190	102	28	–	408		32	25	.561	4 playoff appearances
CHI	1988–89	80	27	41	12	–	66	4th in Norris	9	7	.563	Lost in Conference finals (CGY)
CHI	1989–90	80	41	33	6	–	88	1st in Norris	10	10	.500	Lost in Conference finals (EDM)
CHI	1990–91	80	49	23	8	–	106	1st in Norris	2	4	.333	Lost in Division semifinals (MIN)
CHI	1991–92	80	36	29	15	–	87	2nd in Norris	12	6	.667	Lost in Stanley Cup Final (PIT)
CHI Total		320	153	126	41	–	347		33	27	.550	4 playoff appearances
NYR	1993–94	84	52	24	8	–	112	1st in Atlantic	16	7	.696	Won Stanley Cup (VAN)
NYR Total		84	52	24	8	–	112		16	7	.696	1 playoff appearance 1 Stanley Cup title
STL	1994–95	48	28	15	5	–	61	2nd in Central	3	4	.429	Lost in Conference quarterfinals (VAN)
STL	1995–96	82	32	34	16	–	80	4th in Central	7	6	.538	Lost in Conference semifinals (DET)
STL	1996–97	33	15	17	1	–	(83)	4th in Central	–	–	–	(Fired)
STL Total		163	75	66	22	–	172		10	10	.500	2 playoff appearances
VAN	1997–98	63	21	30	12	–	(64)	7th in Pacific	–	–	–	Missed playoffs
VAN	1998–99	45	15	24	6	–	(58)	4th in Northwest	–	–	–	(Fired)
VAN Total		108	36	54	18	–	90		–	–	–	
BOS	2000–01	74	33	26	7	8	(88)	4th in Northeast	–	–	–	Missed playoffs
BOS Total		74	33	26	7	8	81		–	–	–	
FLA	2001–02	56	16	29	8	3	(60)	4th in Southeast	–	–	–	Missed playoffs
FLA	2002–03	82	24	36	13	9	70	4th in Southeast	–	–	–	Missed playoffs
FLA	2003–04	15	5	8	2	0	(75)	4th in Southeast	–	–	–	(Resigned)
FLA Total		153	45	73	23	12	125		–	–	–	
CGY	2007–08	82	42	30	–	10	94	3rd in Northwest	3	4	.429	Lost in Conference quarterfinals (SJS)
CGY	2008–09	82	46	30	–	6	98	2nd in Northwest	2	4	.333	Lost in Conference quarterfinals (CHI)
CGY Total		164	88	60	–	16	192		5	8	.385	
Career Total		1386	672	531	147	36	1,527		96	77	.555	

Sporting positions
Preceded by Bob McCammon	Head coach of the Philadelphia Flyers; 1984–88	Succeeded by Paul Holmgren
Preceded by Bryan Murray	Winner of the Jack Adams Award; 1985	Succeeded by Glen Sather
Preceded by Bob Murdoch	Head coach of the Chicago Blackhawks; 1988–92	Succeeded by Darryl Sutter
Preceded by Bob Pulford	General Manager of the Chicago Blackhawks; 1990–92	Succeeded by Bob Pulford
Preceded by Ron Smith	Head coach of the New York Rangers; 1993–94	Succeeded by Colin Campbell
Preceded by Ron Caron	General Manager of the St. Louis Blues; 1994–96	Succeeded by Ron Caron
Preceded by Bob Berry	Head coach of the St. Louis Blues; 1994–96	Succeeded by Jim Roberts
Preceded by Tom Renney	Head coach of the Vancouver Canucks; 1997–99	Succeeded by Marc Crawford
Preceded by Pat Burns	Head coach of the Boston Bruins; 2000–01	Succeeded by Robbie Ftorek
Preceded by Duane Sutter	Head coach of the Florida Panthers; 2001–04	Succeeded by Rick Dudley
Preceded by Rick Dudley	General Manager of the Florida Panthers; 2004–06	Succeeded by Jacques Martin
Preceded by Jim Playfair	Head coach of the Calgary Flames; 2007–09	Succeeded by Brent Sutter
