= Lindy Ruff =

Canadian ice hockey player and coach

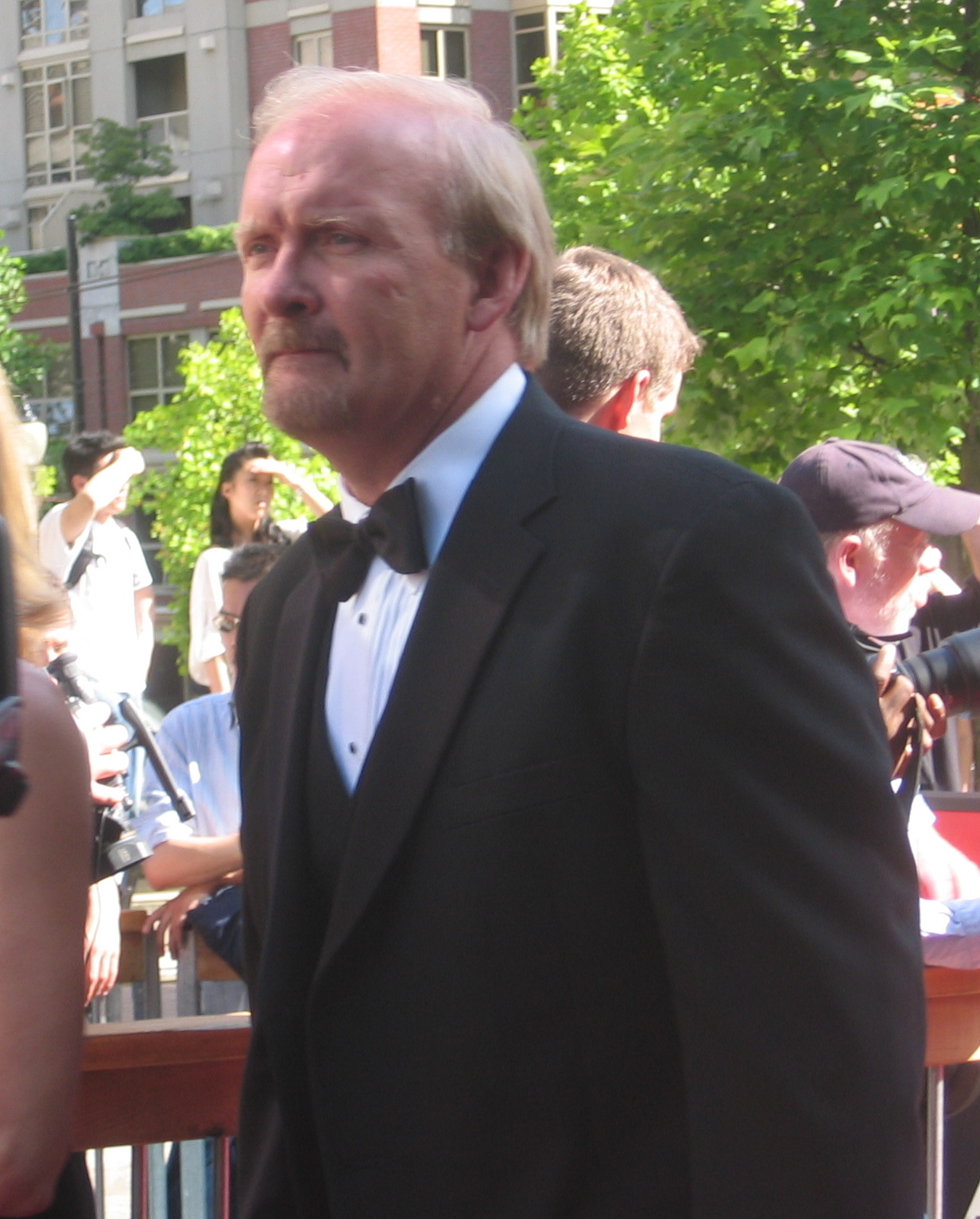
- Ruff at the 2006 NHL awards
- Born: February 17, 1960 (age 66) Warburg, Alberta, Canada
- Height: 6 ft 2 in (188 cm)
- Weight: 201 lb (91 kg; 14 st 5 lb)
- Position: Defence/left wing
- Shot: Left
- Played for: Buffalo Sabres; New York Rangers
- Current NHL coach: Buffalo Sabres
- Coached for: Dallas Stars; New Jersey Devils
- NHL draft: 32nd overall, 1979; Buffalo Sabres
- Playing career: 1979–1993
- Coaching career: 1993–present

Lindy Cameron Ruff (born February 17, 1960) is a Canadian professional ice hockey coach and former player who is the head coach for the Buffalo Sabres of the National Hockey League (NHL). Ruff was previously the head coach of the Sabres from 1997 to 2013, winning the Jack Adams Award in 2006, and has also served as head coach of the Dallas Stars and New Jersey Devils. Ruff has won over 600 games with the Sabres, making him one of three coaches to win that many games for one team in NHL history. During his playing career, Ruff played in the NHL for the Sabres and New York Rangers, the former of which he captained.

Internationally, Ruff was an assistant coach for the Canadian national team at the 2010 and 2014 Winter Olympics, winning gold medals at both.

== Playing career ==
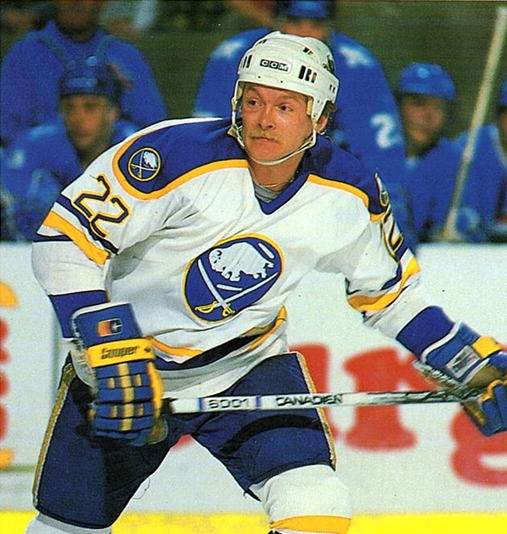
Ruff with the Buffalo Sabres in 1986

Ruff was chosen in the second round, 32nd overall, of the 1979 NHL entry draft, by the Buffalo Sabres. He played for the Sabres and New York Rangers. Ruff gained a reputation as a player for his toughness, character, and hard work on the ice. An illustration of this came in a May 10, 1980, playoff game against the New York Islanders, when opposing goaltender Billy Smith struck Ruff with his stick as he passed in front of his net. Ruff got up, skated back to the goaltender, and tackled him.

Ruff played most of his NHL career for the Sabres, serving as captain of the team for nearly three years, but after Ruff had a falling-out with Sabres head coach Ted Sator, he was traded to the Rangers at the 1989 NHL trade deadline in exchange for a draft pick. The Sabres would use that pick to select Richard Šmehlík, who would later play for several years under Ruff.

Ruff played in 691 NHL games, scoring 105 goals and adding 195 assists for a total of 300 points. He also recorded 1,264 penalty minutes. In 52 playoff games, Ruff recorded 11 goals and 13 assists while accumulating 193 penalty minutes.

== Coaching career ==
=== Assistant coach ===
Ruff became assistant coach of the Florida Panthers for the 1993–94 season until the 1996–97 season. His greatest success as an assistant coach was with the 1995–96 Florida Panthers, who made it to the Stanley Cup Final before losing to the Colorado Avalanche in a four-game sweep.

=== Buffalo Sabres (first tenure) ===
Ruff was named the 15th head coach of the Buffalo Sabres on July 21, 1997. He joined a long list of former Sabres players who eventually became Sabres head coaches: Floyd Smith, Bill Inglis, Craig Ramsay, Jim Schoenfeld and Rick Dudley. He had immediate success in Buffalo, advancing to the Eastern Conference finals in the 1997–98 season.

In Ruff's second season as coach, the Sabres reached the 1999 Stanley Cup Final before losing to the Dallas Stars in six games. The Stars' Brett Hull scored a goal deep into the third overtime. The following two seasons saw Ruff's Sabres lose in the first round to the Philadelphia Flyers and the second round to the Pittsburgh Penguins, respectively.

Buffalo missed the playoffs in the three seasons preceding the 2004–05 NHL lockout amidst the team's bankruptcy and financial problems caused by the Adelphia Communications corporate scandal. After the lockout, Ruff led the Sabres to back-to-back Eastern Conference finals appearances only to lose to the Carolina Hurricanes in 2006 and the Ottawa Senators in 2007. Ruff was the longest-tenured coach in the NHL and was rewarded with a three-year contract extension that had an option for a fourth season.

Ruff is known for being blunt with the media. A well-known example of his bluntness was his comments regarding Toronto Maple Leafs player Darcy Tucker. In his post-game interview following a questionable hit on Jochen Hecht, that knocked the Sabres centre out of the lineup for two weeks with a sprained ACL in the 2005–06 season, Ruff said, "I want him [Tucker] suspended." He also said, "I have not called the NHL office all year and I will call them ten times tomorrow." He called Tucker's hit "an absolute joke".

On April 5, 2006, Ruff became the 31st coach in NHL history to win 300 games, and just the 16th to do so with only one team. Ruff led the Sabres to their most successful regular season ever in 2006–07 with a 53–22–7 record for a total of 113 points.

Ruff was the winner of the 2005–06 Jack Adams Award as coach of the year in the NHL. Tom Renney of the New York Rangers and Peter Laviolette of the Carolina Hurricanes were also nominated. Ruff won by one vote over then Cup-winning coach Laviolette in what is the closest vote in the award's history.

Ruff was again nominated for the Jack Adams Award in 2006–07. His nomination was the second time he has been a finalist for coach of the year. Alain Vigneault of the Vancouver Canucks won the honour; Ruff placed second in voting with 126 points to Vigneault's 134.

In February 2007, Ruff was fined US$10,000 by the NHL after a brawl with the Ottawa Senators. The NHL said Ruff precipitated the brawl following a questionable hit on then co-captain Chris Drury by the Senators' Chris Neil. Because the hit to Drury did not result in a penalty, Ruff sent out Andrew Peters, Patrick Kaleta and Adam Mair, the team's "enforcers". What followed was one of the 2006–07 season's most memorable hockey brawls. Mair began the brawl, punching Ottawa's Jason Spezza as soon as the puck was dropped. Peters tried to start a fight with Dany Heatley, who was reluctant to respond, at one point even hiding behind a linesman. The goaltenders also entered the fight, with Martin Biron challenging Ray Emery, and Ruff himself engaged in a prolonged shouting match with Senators head coach Bryan Murray. A large contingent of Sabres fans attempted to raise money to pay the fine on Ruff's behalf. Ruff declined the fans' offer and had the money raised donated to charity.

After a second-round playoff match against the New York Rangers on April 27, 2007, Ruff would be fined again by the NHL after harshly criticizing officials for an alleged missed too-many-men call against the Rangers, which might have given Buffalo a chance to tie the match in the closing minute.

In the 2006–07 season, Ruff became the first Sabres coach to lead the team to back-to-back 50-win seasons, boasting the fifth-best points percentage in the NHL since 1979.

On October 15, 2008, Ruff became the 23rd coach in NHL history to win 400 games, and just the seventh to win 400 games for one team.

Ruff was named as an associate coach for Canada, which won the gold medal at the 2010 Winter Olympics in Vancouver.

On January 6, 2011, Ruff became only the 16th coach in NHL history to win 500 games, and just the second to win 500 games while only having coached one team.

On January 8, 2011, Ruff became the winningest coach who only coached for one team in NHL history when the Sabres defeated the Phoenix Coyotes 2–1 in overtime. His 501st win behind the bench with the Sabres put him one ahead of Toe Blake, who coached to 500 wins with the Montreal Canadiens. Al Arbour won more games for the New York Islanders, but he also coached the St. Louis Blues early in his career. Along with Arbour, Billy Reay and Barry Trotz, Ruff is one of just four coaches to coach 1,000 NHL games with a single team.

On April 29, 2011, the Sabres announced Ruff had agreed to a multiple-year contract extension.

On February 20, 2013, the Sabres announced Ruff had been relieved of his coaching duties, ending his tenure as the NHL's longest active-serving coach with one team and second only to Gregg Popovich in the four major sports in North America. Ron Rolston, head coach of the American Hockey League's Rochester Americans, was named as his replacement.

=== Dallas Stars ===
On June 20, 2013, the Dallas Stars announced they were in the process of hiring Ruff as head coach. This was also on the anniversary of the controversial defeat of the Sabres in the Stanley Cup Final in 1999. On June 21, 2013, the Stars announced Ruff would be their new head coach.

In 2014, Ruff led the Stars to their first playoff appearance since 2008, but lost in the opening round to the Anaheim Ducks in six games. Ruff served as the head coach of the Central Division squad in the 2015–16 All-Star Game.

On April 9, 2017, the Stars announced Ruff would not return as head coach for the 2017–18 season.

=== New York Rangers ===
On July 10, 2017, it was announced Ruff was named as assistant coach of the New York Rangers.

=== New Jersey Devils ===
On July 9, 2020, Ruff was named head coach of the New Jersey Devils. On January 28, 2021, Ruff coached his 1,500th game in the NHL as the Devils lost 3–1 to the Philadelphia Flyers. The Devils had been engaged in a rebuilding phase in the leadup to Ruff's hiring, with the expectation that they would soon compete for the playoffs again, but the team continued to struggle during his first two seasons with the team, finishing near the bottom of the standings in each. The 2021–22 season had begun with some hopes based on off-season acquisitions and the maturation of young star players, but the team was plagued by injuries, using a franchise record seven different goaltenders over its 82 games.

Questions continued to surround Ruff's job security heading into the 2022–23 season, with some suspecting that the hiring of former Florida Panthers coach and Jack Adams Award finalist Andrew Brunette as an assistant coach presaged him replacing Ruff at some point in the season. After the Devils lost their first two games of the season in a manner much resembling the prior years, chants of "Fire Lindy!" broke out at the Prudential Center. However, the team's fortunes changed rapidly, and by the end of October, they were embarking on a lengthy winning streak that would carry them into first place in the Metropolitan Division. On November 12, after a 4–2 victory over the Arizona Coyotes, the team's ninth consecutive, the audience chanted "Sorry Lindy!" Ruff said afterwards "I accept the apology and maybe one day we can all sit down and have a beer and laugh about it." The team's winning streaking would ultimately extend to 13 games, equaling the franchise record. On November 26, 2022, Ruff became the fifth NHL coach to win 800 games after a 5–1 against the Washington Capitals. The Devils ultimately finished third in the NHL, and second in their division, with a 52–22–8 record. Ruff was again named a finalist for the Jack Adams Award. On May 17, 2023, Devils general manager Tom Fitzgerald announced that Ruff would be retained as team's head coach after his contract expired at the end the 2022–23 season.

On October 11, 2023, the Devils signed Ruff to a multi-year contract extension. On December 16, Ruff recorded his 850th NHL regular season win and passed Ken Hitchcock for fourth place in all-time NHL regular season wins. On March 4, 2024, the Devils fired Ruff and replaced him with Travis Green on interim basis.

=== Return to Buffalo ===
On April 22, 2024, Ruff was re-hired as head coach of the Sabres, replacing Don Granato.

On April 17, 2025, Ruff won his 900th game, becoming the fifth NHL head coach to reach the mark.

The 2025–26 season saw the Sabres struggle early in the season, being in last place on December 15, before going on an unprecedented run that saw them achieve a 36–9–5 record for the rest of the regular season, winning the Atlantic Division for the first time in franchise history. This was their first division title since the 2009–10 season. In recognition of his management of the Sabres, Ruff was named a finalist for the Jack Adams Award for the NHL's coach for the fifth time in his career, tying the league nomination record. The Sabres qualified for the 2026 Stanley Cup playoffs, their first postseason appearance since 2011, facing the Boston Bruins in the first round. Ruff's Sabres defeated the Bruins in six games, the franchise's first playoff series victory since 2007. The Sabres ultimately lost to the Montreal Canadiens in seven games in the second round. Following the end of the postseason, Ruff signed a two-year contract extension with the Sabres on May 20, 2026.

== Personal life ==
Ruff has three brothers. Brent was one of four teammates killed in the Swift Current Broncos bus crash in 1986. Marty was a first-round draft pick of the St. Louis Blues but never appeared in an NHL game. Randy played and coached junior ice hockey.

Ruff and his wife Gaye have four children.

== Career statistics ==
=== Regular season and playoffs ===
			Regular season					Playoffs
Season	Team	League	GP	G	A	Pts	PIM	GP	G	A	Pts	PIM
1976–77	Taber Golden Suns	AJHL	60	13	33	46	112	—	—	—	—	—
1976–77	Lethbridge Broncos	WCHL	2	0	2	2	0	—	—	—	—	—
1977–78	Lethbridge Broncos	WCHL	66	9	24	33	219	8	2	8	10	4
1978–79	Lethbridge Broncos	WHL	24	9	18	27	108	6	0	1	1	0
1979–80	Buffalo Sabres	NHL	63	5	14	19	38	8	1	1	2	19
1980–81	Buffalo Sabres	NHL	65	8	18	26	121	6	3	1	4	23
1981–82	Buffalo Sabres	NHL	79	16	32	48	194	4	0	0	0	28
1982–83	Buffalo Sabres	NHL	60	12	17	29	130	10	4	2	6	47
1983–84	Buffalo Sabres	NHL	58	14	31	45	101	3	1	0	1	9
1984–85	Buffalo Sabres	NHL	39	13	11	24	47	5	2	4	6	19
1985–86	Buffalo Sabres	NHL	54	20	12	32	158	—	—	—	—	—
1986–87	Buffalo Sabres	NHL	50	6	14	20	74	—	—	—	—	—
1987–88	Buffalo Sabres	NHL	77	2	23	25	179	6	0	2	2	23
1988–89	Buffalo Sabres	NHL	63	6	11	17	86	—	—	—	—	—
1988–89	New York Rangers	NHL	13	0	5	5	31	2	0	0	0	17
1989–90	New York Rangers	NHL	56	3	6	9	80	8	0	3	3	12
1990–91	New York Rangers	NHL	14	0	1	1	27	—	—	—	—	—
1991–92	Rochester Americans	AHL	62	10	24	34	110	13	0	4	4	16
1992–93	San Diego Gulls	IHL	81	10	32	42	100	14	1	6	7	26
NHL totals			691	105	195	300	1264	52	11	13	24	193

== Head coaching record ==
Team	Year	Regular season							Postseason			
Team	Year	G	W	L	T	OTL	Pts	Finish	W	L	Win %	Result
BUF	1997–98	82	36	29	17	—	89	3rd in Northeast	10	5	.667	Lost in conference finals (WSH)
BUF	1998–99	82	37	28	17	—	91	4th in Northeast	14	7	.667	Lost in Stanley Cup Final (DAL)
BUF	1999–00	82	35	32	11	4	85	3rd in Northeast	1	4	.200	Lost in conference quarterfinals (PHI)
BUF	2000–01	82	46	30	5	1	98	2nd in Northeast	7	6	.538	Lost in conference semifinals (PIT)
BUF	2001–02	82	35	35	11	1	82	5th in Northeast	—	—	—	Missed playoffs
BUF	2002–03	82	27	37	10	8	72	5th in Northeast	—	—	—	Missed playoffs
BUF	2003–04	82	37	34	7	4	85	5th in Northeast	—	—	—	Missed playoffs
BUF	2005–06	82	52	24	—	6	110	2nd in Northeast	11	7	.611	Lost in conference finals (CAR)
BUF	2006–07	82	53	22	—	7	113	1st in Northeast	9	7	.563	Lost in conference finals (OTT)
BUF	2007–08	82	39	31	—	12	90	4th in Northeast	—	—	—	Missed playoffs
BUF	2008–09	82	41	32	—	9	91	3rd in Northeast	—	—	—	Missed playoffs
BUF	2009–10	82	45	27	—	10	100	1st in Northeast	2	4	.333	Lost in conference quarterfinals (BOS)
BUF	2010–11	82	43	29	—	10	96	3rd in Northeast	3	4	.429	Lost in conference quarterfinals (PHI)
BUF	2011–12	82	39	32	—	11	89	3rd in Northeast	—	—	—	Missed playoffs
BUF	2012–13	17	6	10	—	1	13	(fired)	—	—	—	—
BUF total		1,165	571	432	78	84			57	44	.564	8 playoff appearances
DAL	2013–14	82	40	31	—	11	91	5th in Central	2	4	.333	Lost in first round (ANA)
DAL	2014–15	82	41	31	—	10	92	6th in Central	—	—	—	Missed playoffs
DAL	2015–16	82	50	23	—	9	109	1st in Central	7	6	.538	Lost in second round (STL)
DAL	2016–17	82	34	37	—	11	79	6th in Central	—	—	—	Missed playoffs
DAL total		328	165	122	—	41			9	10	.474	2 playoff appearances
NJD	2020–21	56	19	30	—	7	45	7th in East	—	—	—	Missed playoffs
NJD	2021–22	82	27	46	—	9	63	7th in Metropolitan	—	—	—	Missed playoffs
NJD	2022–23	82	52	22	—	8	112	2nd in Metropolitan	5	7	.417	Lost in second round (CAR)
NJD	2023–24	61	30	27	—	4	64	(fired)	—	—	—	—
NJD total		281	128	125	—	28			5	7	.417	1 playoff appearance
BUF	2024–25	82	36	39	—	7	79	7th in Atlantic	—	—	—	Missed playoffs
BUF	2025–26	82	50	23	—	9	109	1st in Atlantic	7	6	.538	Lost in second round (MTL)
BUF total		1,329	657	494	78	100			64	50	.561	1 playoff appearance
Total		1,938	950	741	78	169			78	67	.538	12 playoff appearances

== See also ==
- Captain (ice hockey)
- List of National Hockey League head coaching wins and point percentage leaders

Sporting positions
Preceded by Gilbert Perreault	Buffalo Sabres captain 1986–1989	Succeeded by Mike Foligno
Preceded by Ted Nolan; Don Granato	Head coach of the Buffalo Sabres; 1997–2013; 2024–present	Succeeded by Ron Rolston; Incumbent
Preceded by Glen Gulutzan	Head coach of the Dallas Stars; 2013–2017	Succeeded by Ken Hitchcock
Preceded by Alain Nasreddine (interim)	Head coach of the New Jersey Devils; 2020–2024	Succeeded by Travis Green (interim)
Awards and achievements
Preceded by John Tortorella	Jack Adams Award winner 2006	Succeeded by Alain Vigneault
