= Punch Imlach =

Canadian ice hockey player, coach and general manager (1918–1987)

- Hockey Hall of Fame, 1984 (Builder)
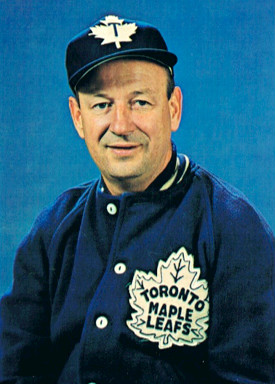
- Imlach with the Toronto Maple Leafs, c. 1963
- Born: March 15, 1918 Toronto, Ontario, Canada
- Died: December 1, 1987 (aged 69) Toronto, Ontario, Canada
- Height: 5 ft 8 in (173 cm)
- Weight: 161 lb (73 kg; 11 st 7 lb)
- Position: Centre
- Shot: Right
- Played for: Toronto Young Rangers; Toronto Goodyears; Toronto Marlboros; Quebec Aces
- Playing career: 1941–1949
- Coaching career: 1958–1980

George "Punch" Imlach (March 15, 1918 – December 1, 1987) was a Canadian ice hockey coach and general manager best known for his association with the Toronto Maple Leafs, whom he was with from 1958 to 1969, and again from 1979 to 1981, and the Buffalo Sabres, whom he was with from 1970 to 1978. With Toronto he won the Stanley Cup four times, from 1962 to 1964 and again in 1967. He is a member of the Hockey Hall of Fame, and the Ontario Sports Hall of Fame.

== Early career ==
Born in Toronto, Imlach attended Riverdale Collegiate Institute and played junior hockey in the OHA for the Toronto Young Rangers (1935–38) and senior hockey with the Toronto Goodyears (1938–40) and the Toronto Marlboros (1940–41). He enlisted in the Canadian Army during World War II, where he coached for the first time, with an army team in Cornwall, Ontario. He was invited to training camp by the Detroit Red Wings after being discharged, but felt he had put on too much weight and declined.

Imlach played for the Quebec Aces of the QSHL from 1945 to 1949 and spent 11 seasons with the team, becoming coach and then general manager, and then vice-president and part-owner of the franchise. After the 1956–57 season, Imlach moved to professional hockey, hired by the Boston Bruins as general manager of their Springfield Indians farm team. Before the season ended, Imlach had made himself head coach as well. After the season, team owner Eddie Shore took back control of the team, leaving Imlach without a job, although he was still under contract to the Bruins.

== Joining the Maple Leafs ==
In July 1958, the Toronto Maple Leafs hired Imlach, aged 40, as one of the team's two assistant general managers, along with King Clancy. However, the Leafs did not have a general manager, and Imlach instead reported to a seven-member committee headed by Stafford Smythe which oversaw the team's business operations. In November, Imlach was named general manager—only the third full-time general manager in the team's 40-year history. Only a week after his hiring, he fired head coach Billy Reay; Reay had been offered the general manager's job before Imlach was hired, but turned it down. Initially, Imlach said he was replacing Reay with Bert Olmstead as player-coach, but almost immediately, he changed his mind and made himself head coach.

Imlach was known as a harsh taskmaster who frequently abused his players verbally and physically. He had a preference for older players, many of whom were his strongest supporters as they felt Imlach was giving them their last chance at winning the Stanley Cup. In contrast, many younger players, such as Frank Mahovlich, chafed at Imlach's autocratic coaching style.

Imlach took over a team that had finished last the previous season and was mired in last place again at the time he took over for Reay. However, the team staged a strong run late in the season and finished a point ahead of the New York Rangers for fourth place, allowing them to squeeze into the playoffs. They defeated the favoured Boston Bruins in the first round before losing to the league-leading Montreal Canadiens in five games in the Stanley Cup Final. Three years later, Imlach led the Leafs to their first Stanley Cup championship in 11 years, and followed this title up with additional Stanley Cup wins in 1963, 1964, and 1967.

In February 1964, Imlach traded Dick Duff, Bob Nevin and three young prospects – Rod Seiling, Arnie Brown, and Bill Collins – to the Rangers for Andy Bathgate and Don McKenney. While Bathgate and McKenney were both gone following the next season, Nevin played a major role in the Rangers' late 1960s resurgence and Duff won four more Cups with the Canadiens. In the 1965 intra-league draft, Imlach left Gerry Cheevers, a young goaltending prospect, unprotected. Cheevers was snapped up by the Boston Bruins and went on to a Hall of Fame career.

The Leafs struggled following the NHL's expansion from six teams to 12 for the 1967–68 season, and Imlach responded by pulling off another big trade. In February 1968, he sent Mahovlich, 20-year-old Garry Unger, Pete Stemkowski, and the rights to Carl Brewer to the Detroit Red Wings for Paul Henderson, Norm Ullman, and Floyd Smith. Two months later, Imlach sent 28-year-old Jim Pappin to the Chicago Black Hawks, where he would become one of that team's top scorers.

In December 1968, Stafford Smythe asked Imlach to give the coaching job to John McLellan, but Imlach refused and told Smythe to either fire him or leave him alone. During the season, Mike Walton walked out on the team, refusing to play for Imlach again, but returned about a week later. On April 6, 1969, minutes after an early and embarrassing playoff elimination at the hands of the Bruins, the Leafs fired Imlach. He still had a year remaining on his contract, which paid him about $35,000 a year. In the dressing room after the announcement was made, veteran Leafs Johnny Bower and Tim Horton both said they would leave with Imlach (they both returned the following season, although neither would remain with the team for long). Imlach's assistant, Clancy, had previously said that he would walk away if Imlach was fired, but was persuaded to stay with the team. Jim Gregory was immediately announced as Imlach's replacement as general manager.

== Building the Sabres ==
After his dismissal from the Leafs, it was expected that Imlach would join the NHL's new Vancouver franchise. Imlach, Joe Crozier, and Foster Hewitt had become partners in the Vancouver Canucks of the Western Hockey League and were in line to become owners of the Vancouver NHL team. But they lacked the financial resources to buy the team, which went to Medical Investment Corporation (Medicor). Medicor bought the WHL Canucks for $2.8 million, with Imlach making a reported gain of more than $250,000. He was offered a job with the NHL Canucks, but instead accepted an offer from the NHL's other expansion team, the Buffalo Sabres, as their first coach and general manager in 1970.

In the team's first draft, it was a foregone conclusion that the first selection would be junior phenom Gilbert Perreault. The first pick would go to the team that won the spin of a roulette wheel. Imlach opted to take numbers 11–20 on the wheel, since 11 was his favourite number. When league president Clarence Campbell spun the wheel, he initially thought the pointer landed on 1. However, while Campbell was congratulating the Vancouver delegation, Imlach asked Campbell to check again. As it turned out, the pointer was actually on 11. Imlach promptly selected Perreault, who would go on to play 17 years with the Sabres and still holds every major offensive record in Sabres history. (Perreault, incidentally, would himself be assigned the number 11 for his entire career in Buffalo - the same number he had worn for his three seasons with the Montreal Jr. Canadiens - a number that has since been retired by the Sabres organization.)

Imlach suffered a heart attack on January 7, 1972, and stepped down as Sabres coach in May after being told by doctors that fatigue would put his health at risk. Joe Crozier filled in as interim coach after Imlach's heart attack and was given the job outright for the 1972–1973 season.

In the 1974 entry draft, Imlach—frustrated with the excessive tedium and length of that year's draft proceedings—deliberately selected an imaginary Japanese centre, Taro Tsujimoto, supposedly of the Tokyo Katanas, in the 11th round (183rd overall). Only after weeks had passed did the league discover that Tsujimoto did not in fact exist. Today, the league officially records the 183rd selection of the 1974 entry draft as an "invalid claim"; the Sabres still list Tsujimoto among the team's alumni.

During the 1974–75 NHL season, the Sabres, coached by one of Imlach's former players, Floyd Smith, made the Stanley Cup finals in only their fifth year of existence. With notable exceptions like Perreault and Rick Martin, many Sabres players feuded with Imlach, particularly Jim Schoenfeld, the team captain from 1974 to 1977, whom Imlach criticized publicly. After being eliminated in the second round of the playoffs in 1978, Imlach promised sweeping changes to the roster, but the changes never came. With the team off to an 8–10–6 record, the Sabres fired Imlach on December 4, 1978, along with coach Marcel Pronovost. Nevertheless, he was one of the inductees in the inaugural class of the Buffalo Sabres Hall of Fame.

== Controversy in Toronto ==
In July 1979, Imlach returned to the Leafs as general manager and the right-hand man of owner Harold Ballard, his longtime friend. It was a controversial return, one that involved the dismantling of a team that had faced the Montreal Canadiens in both the 1978 and 1979 playoffs and was viewed by many as having a promising future. On his first day with the team, Imlach told the media that the Leafs only had five or six good players and the rest of the team needed to be improved.

Imlach implemented a dress code requiring that all players wear a jacket and tie when in the Leafs' offices. Tiger Williams was fined $250 for not wearing a tie, and the fine would have doubled for a second offence. Players were no longer allowed to drink beer on plane and bus rides back from road games.

Imlach quickly butted heads with team captain Darryl Sittler, using confrontational tactics to try to undermine his influence on the team. Imlach also disliked Sittler's prominent role in the NHL Players Association; during Imlach's first stint with the Leafs, he was well known as an ardent foe of the union and its executive director, Alan Eagleson. In September, Imlach went to court in an unsuccessful attempt to get an injunction to stop Sittler and goaltender Mike Palmateer from appearing on the TV show Showdown. Sittler had a no-trade clause in his contract and, through his agent Eagleson, insisted on $500,000 to waive it. With Sittler apparently untouchable, Imlach instead traded Sittler's best friend Lanny McDonald to the moribund Colorado Rockies on December 29, 1979. An anonymous player told the Toronto Star that Ballard and Imlach made the trade specifically to undermine Sittler's influence on the team. In protest, prior to the Leafs' first game following the trade, Sittler removed the captain's "C" from his sweater, and resigned as team captain after the game. Eagleson called the trade "a classless act."

Imlach offered Sittler to the Sabres in return for Perreault, but was turned down. He also rejected an offer from the Philadelphia Flyers who were said to be willing to trade Rick MacLeish and André Dupont for Sittler. In March 1980, after Floyd Smith was injured in a car accident and acting coach Dick Duff led the team to two lopsided defeats, Imlach named himself as coach, though it would actually be assistant coach Joe Crozier who would direct the team from behind the bench for their last ten regular season games. Imlach and Crozier were able to get the Leafs to squeak into the playoffs, albeit with a record five games under .500—the first of 13 straight seasons without a winning record. Imlach named Crozier as his full-time successor after the season.

It looked like the Leafs were ready to accept an offer for Sittler from the Quebec Nordiques when Imlach had another heart attack in August 1980. Ballard used the opportunity to name himself acting general manager and hold talks with Sittler, and the two agreed that Sittler would return to the team as captain for the 1980–81 season. Ballard also signed defenceman Börje Salming to a new contract with terms that Imlach had refused to offer. Before the end of 1981, Imlach was back running the Leafs as general manager.

During the Leafs' training camp in September 1981, Imlach suffered a third heart attack, which was followed by quadruple bypass surgery at Toronto General Hospital. Ballard became interim manager and told the media that Imlach's poor health meant that "he's through as general manager." Imlach was never officially fired, but when he tried to return to work in November, he found that his parking spot at Maple Leaf Gardens had been reassigned and Gerry McNamara had been made acting general manager. Imlach never returned to work and his contract was allowed to expire.

He suffered a fourth heart attack in November 1985 and died after a fifth heart attack in Toronto on December 1, 1987, at the age of 69. Over his career, Imlach amassed a coaching record of 423 wins, 373 losses and 163 ties to go along with four Stanley Cups. His 370 wins with the Leafs are still the most in franchise history. He was inducted into the Hockey Hall of Fame as a builder in 1984 and the Ontario Sports Hall of Fame in 2004.

== Coaching record ==
Team	Year	Regular season						Post season			
Team	Year	G	W	L	T	Pts	Finish	W	L	Pct.	Result
Toronto Maple Leafs	1958–59	50	22	20	8	52	4th in NHL	5	7	.417	Lost in Stanley Cup Final
Toronto Maple Leafs	1959–60	70	35	26	9	79	2nd in NHL	4	6	.400	Lost in Stanley Cup Final
Toronto Maple Leafs	1960–61	70	39	19	12	90	2nd in NHL	1	4	.200	Lost in Semifinals
Toronto Maple Leafs	1961–62	70	37	22	11	85	2nd in NHL	8	4	.667	Won Stanley Cup
Toronto Maple Leafs	1962–63	70	35	23	12	82	1st in NHL	8	6	.571	Won Stanley Cup
Toronto Maple Leafs	1963–64	70	33	25	12	78	3rd in NHL	8	2	.800	Won Stanley Cup
Toronto Maple Leafs	1964–65	70	30	26	14	74	4th in NHL	2	4	.333	Lost in Semifinals
Toronto Maple Leafs	1965–66	70	34	25	11	79	3rd in NHL	0	4	.000	Lost in Semifinals
Toronto Maple Leafs	1966–67	70	32	27	11	75	3rd in NHL	8	4	.667	Won Stanley Cup
Toronto Maple Leafs	1967–68	74	33	31	10	76	5th in East	—	—	—	Did not qualify
Toronto Maple Leafs	1968–69	76	35	26	15	85	4th in East	0	4	.000	Lost in Quarterfinals
Buffalo Sabres	1970–71	78	24	39	15	63	5th in East	—	—	—	Did not qualify
Buffalo Sabres	1971–72	41	8	23	10	26	Resigned	—	—	—	—
Toronto Maple Leafs	1979–80	10	5	5	0	10	4th in Adams	0	3	.000	Lost in Preliminary round
Toronto Maple Leafs Totals		770	370	275	125	865		44	48	.478	11 playoff appearances 4 Stanley Cup titles
Buffalo Sabres Totals		119	32	62	25	89					
NHL Totals		889	402	337	150	954		44	48	.478	11 playoff appearances 4 Stanley Cup titles

Sporting positions
Preceded by Stafford Smythe (de facto)	General Manager of the Toronto Maple Leafs; 1958–69	Succeeded by Jim Gregory
Preceded by Jim Gregory	General Manager of the Toronto Maple Leafs; 1979–81	Succeeded by Gerry McNamara
Preceded by Position created	General Manager of the Buffalo Sabres; 1970–78	Succeeded by John Anderson
Preceded by Billy Reay	Head coach of the Toronto Maple Leafs; 1958–69	Succeeded by John McLellan
Preceded by Position created	Head coach of the Buffalo Sabres; 1970–72	Succeeded by Floyd Smith
Preceded by Dick Duff	Head coach of the Toronto Maple Leafs; 1979–80	Succeeded by Joe Crozier
