= List of Toronto Maple Leafs head coaches =

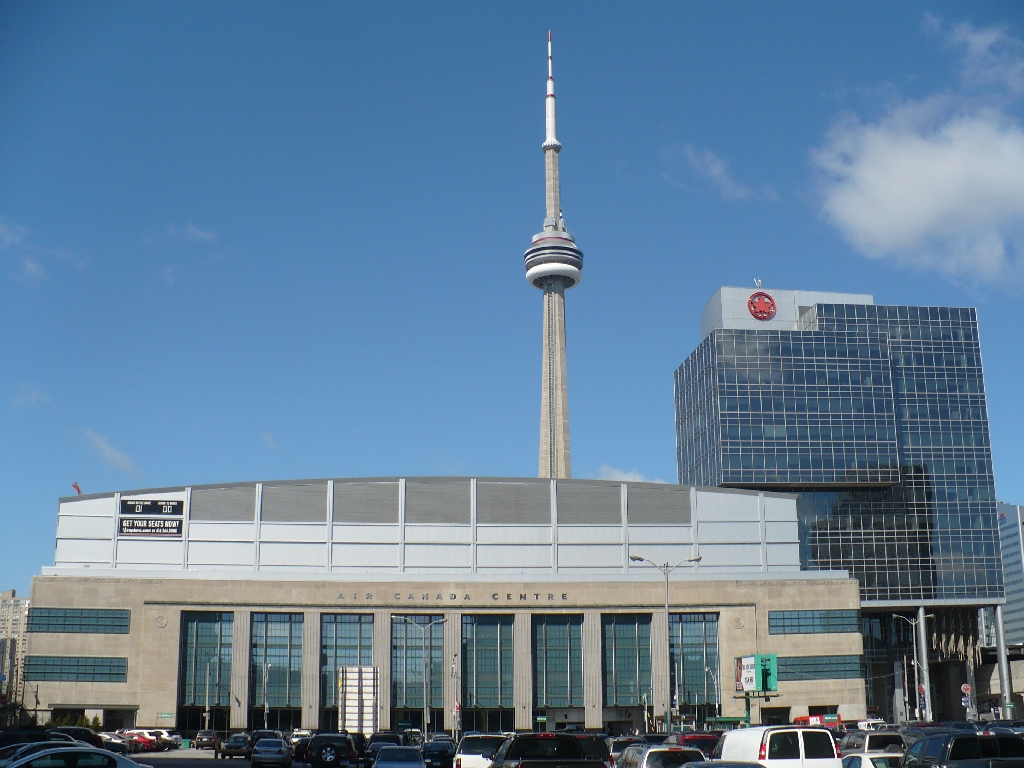
The Scotiabank Arena, home of the Toronto Maple Leafs since 1999 after the maple leaf gardens closed in 1999 as the last original 6 arena

The Toronto Maple Leafs are a professional ice hockey team based in Toronto. The team is a member of the Atlantic Division in the Eastern Conference of the National Hockey League (NHL) and is one of the Original Six teams of the NHL. There have been 42 head coaches in the franchise history; one during the era of the Toronto Arenas (1917–1919), seven during the era of the Toronto St. Patricks (1919–1927) and the rest under the Toronto Maple Leafs (1927–present). Five Maple Leafs coaches have been inducted into the Hockey Hall of Fame as players: Dick Irvin, Joe Primeau, King Clancy, Red Kelly, and Dick Duff while five others have been inducted as builders: Conn Smythe, Hap Day, Punch Imlach, Roger Neilson, and Pat Quinn.

Frank Carroll (brother of the team's first NHL coach, Dick Carroll) has the highest winning percentage of any Maple Leafs coach, with a .625 record from the 24 games he coached in his single 1920–21 season. Neither Mike Rodden nor interim coach Dick Duff, who coached only two games each in 1927 and 1980 respectively, won a game with the team. Dan Maloney has the worst record of any coach who coached more than a season, with a .328 winning percentage from 160 games. Punch Imlach coached the most games of any Maple Leafs coach with 750 games from 1959 to 1969. Pat Burns is the franchise's only coach to win the Jack Adams Award awarded to the head coach "adjudged to have contributed the most to his team's success." Pat Quinn also won the award, but with two teams prior to coaching the Maple Leafs.

The current head coach is Jim Hiller, who was hired on June 17, 2026.

== Key ==
#	Number of coaches–a running total of the number of coaches, any coach who has two or more separate terms is only counted once.
GC	Games coached
W	Wins
L	Losses
T	Ties
OT	Overtime/shootout losses
Win%	Winning percentage
*	Elected to the Hockey Hall of Fame
†	Spent entire NHL head coaching career with the Maple Leafs
!	Also played for the Maple Leafs

== Coaches ==
Note: Statistics are correct through the 2025–26 season.

#	Name	Term	Regular season					Playoffs				Awards	Reference
#	Name	Term	GC	W	L	T/OT	Win%	GC	W	L	T	Awards	Reference
Toronto Arenas
1	Dick Carroll^{†}	1917–1919	40	18	22	0	.450	2	1	1	0	Stanley Cup (1918)	
Toronto St. Patricks
2	Frank Heffernan^{†}	1919–1920	12	5	7	0	.417	—	—	—	—		
3	Harvey Sproule^{†}	1920	12	7	5	0	.583	—	—	—	—		
4	Frank Carroll^{†}	1920–1921	24	15	9	0	.625	2	0	2	0		
5	George O'Donoghue^{†}	1921–1923	29	15	13	1	.534	2	1	0	1	Stanley Cup (1922)	
6	Charles Querrie^{†}	1923–1924	43	21	21	1	.500	—	—	—	—		
7	Eddie Powers^{†}	1924–1926	66	31	32	3	.492	2	0	2	0		
—	Charles Querrie^{†}	1926–1927	29	8	17	4	.345	—	—	—	—		
8	Mike Rodden^{†}	1927	2	0	2	0	.000	—	—	—	—		
Toronto Maple Leafs
9	Alex Romeril^{†}	1927	13	7	5	1	.577	—	—	—	—		
10	Conn Smythe*	1927–1930	134	57	57	20	.500	4	2	2	0		
11	Art Duncan	1930–1931	47	21	16	10	.553	2	0	1	1		
—	Conn Smythe* (interim)	1931	1	1	0	0	1.000	—	—	—	—		
12	Dick Irvin*	1931–1940	427	216	152	59	.576	66	33	32	1	Stanley Cup (1932)	
13	Hap Day*^{!}	1940–1950	546	259	206	81	.557	80	49	31	0	Stanley Cup (1942, 1945, 1947–1949)	
14	Joe Primeau*^{!}	1950–1953	210	97	71	42	.562	15	8	6	1	Stanley Cup (1951)	
15	King Clancy^{*!}	1953–1956	210	80	81	49	.498	14	2	12	0		
16	Howie Meeker^{†!}	1956–1957	70	21	34	15	.407	—	—	—	—		
17	Billy Reay	1957–1958	90	26	50	14	.367	—	—	—	—		
18	Punch Imlach*	1958–1969	760	365	270	125	.569	89	44	45	0	Stanley Cup (1962–1964, 1967)	
—	King Clancy^{*!} (interim)	1966	10	7	1	2	.800	—	—	—	—		
19	John McLellan^{†}	1969–1973	295	117	136	42	.462	11	3	8	0		
—	King Clancy^{*!} (interim)	1972	15	9	3	3	.750	—	—	—	—		
20	Red Kelly*^{!}	1973–1977	318	133	123	62	.516	30	11	19	0		
21	Roger Neilson*	1977–1979	160	75	62	23	.541	19	8	11	0		
22	Floyd Smith^{!}	1979–1980	68	30	33	5	.477	—	—	—	—		
23	Dick Duff*^{!} (interim)	1980	2	0	2	0	.000	—	—	—	—		
—	Punch Imlach* (interim)	1980	10	5	5	0	.500	3	0	3	0		
24	Joe Crozier^{!}	1980–1981	40	13	22	5	.388	—	—	—	—		
25	Mike Nykoluk^{†}	1981–1984	280	89	144	47	.402	7	1	6	0		
26	Dan Maloney^{!}	1984–1986	160	45	100	15	.328	10	6	4	0		
27	John Brophy^{†}	1986–1988	193	64	111	18	.378	19	9	10	0		
28	George Armstrong^{†!}	1988–1989	47	17	26	4	.404	—	—	—	—		
29	Doug Carpenter	1989–1990	91	39	47	5	.456	5	1	4	0		
30	Tom Watt	1990–1992	149	52	80	17	.406	—	—	—	—		
31	Pat Burns*	1992–1996	281	133	107	41	.546	46	23	23	0	Jack Adams Award (1993)	
32	Nick Beverley^{†}	1996	17	9	6	2	.588	6	2	4	0		
33	Mike Murphy	1996–1998	164	60	87	17	.418	—	—	—	—		
34	Pat Quinn*^{!}	1998–2006	574	300	196	78	.591	80	41	39	0		
35	Paul Maurice	2006–2008	164	76	66	22	.530	—	—	—	—		
36	Ron Wilson^{!}	2008–2012	310	130	135	45	.492	—	—	—	—		
37	Randy Carlyle^{!}	2012–2015	188	91	78	19	.535	7	3	4	0		
38	Peter Horachek (interim)	2015	42	8	28	6	.262	—	—	—	—		
39	Mike Babcock	2015–2019	328	164	123	41	.563	20	8	12	0		
40	Sheldon Keefe	2019–2024	349	212	97	40	.607	37	16	21	0		
41	Craig Berube^{!}	2024–2026	164	84	62	18	.567	13	7	6	0		
42	Jim Hiller	2026–present					–						
