= List of Buffalo Sabres head coaches =

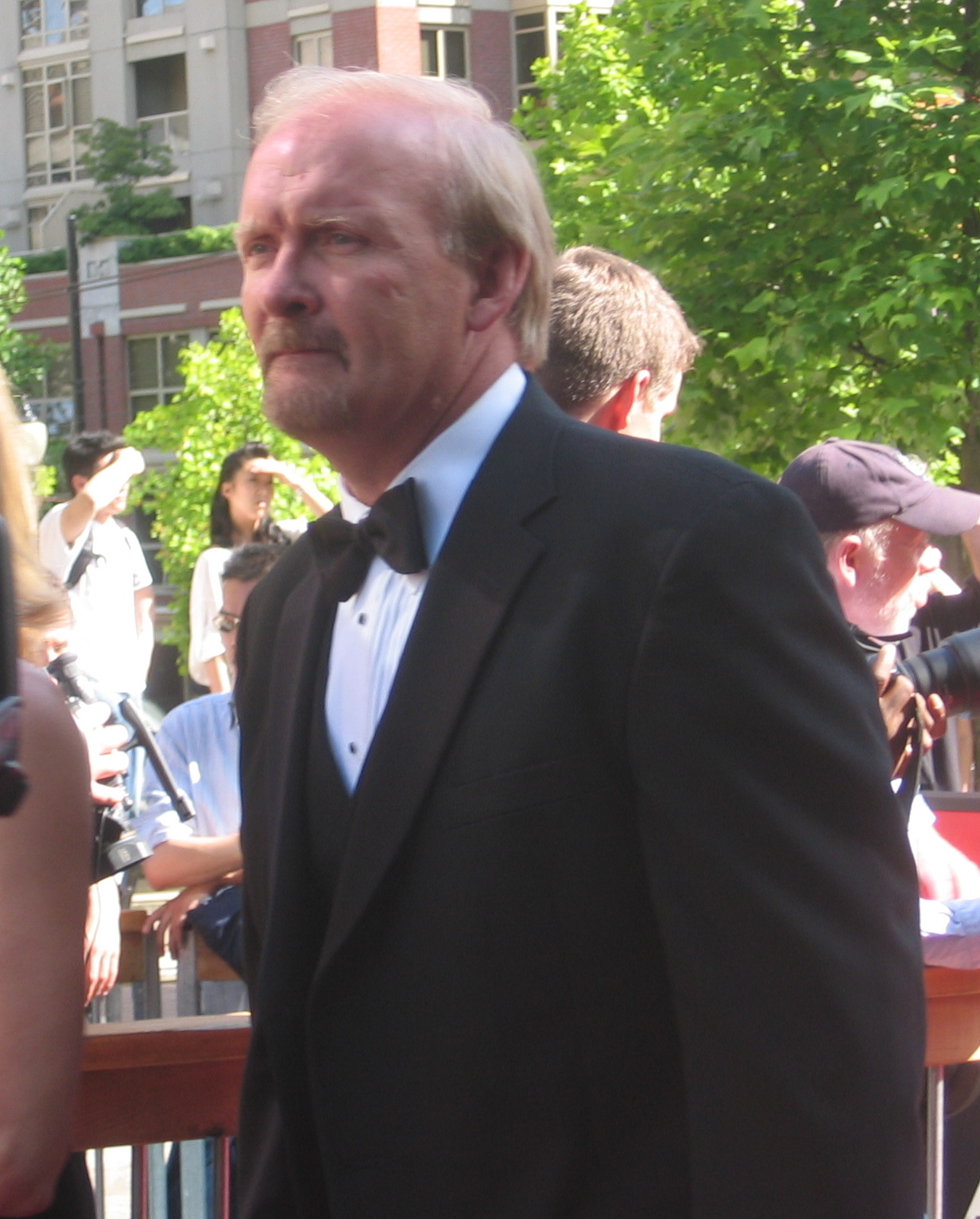
At 16+ seasons (1997–2013, 2024–present), Lindy Ruff has the longest tenure of any coach in Sabres history.

The Buffalo Sabres are a professional ice hockey team based in Buffalo, New York. They are members of the Atlantic Division in the Eastern Conference of the National Hockey League (NHL). There have been 20 head coaches of the Buffalo Sabres since the team's debut in the 1970–71 NHL season.

Punch Imlach, Scotty Bowman, Marcel Pronovost, Roger Neilson and Phil Housley have all made it to the Hockey Hall of Fame, while Bowman, Lindy Ruff, Dan Bylsma and Ted Nolan have all won the Jack Adams Award, an honor given annually to the National Hockey League coach "adjudged to have contributed the most to his team's success" (Bylsma and Bowman won their awards with other teams). The first head coach, Hall of Famer Punch Imlach, has the lowest winning percentage of any Sabres coach, with a .370 winning percentage during his 120-game tenure. Ron Rolston is a close second with a .372 win percentage in his two partial seasons with the team (compared equally, Rolston would have a worse record since many of Rolston's wins came in shootouts, which did not exist in Imlach's era).

The Sabres have made two appearances in the Stanley Cup Final, losing four games to two against the Philadelphia Flyers in 1975, under Smith, and again four to two against the Dallas Stars in 1999, under Ruff. Ruff has led the Sabres into the playoffs seven times.

Seven of the team's head coaches played for the Sabres during their careers: Floyd Smith, Bill Inglis, Jim Schoenfeld, Craig Ramsay, Rick Dudley, Lindy Ruff and Phil Housley. In addition, two others, Ted Nolan and Dan Bylsma, played for the Rochester Americans at a time when the Americans were the Sabres' top minor-league affiliate.

The current head coach is Lindy Ruff, who was hired for his second tenure on April 22, 2024.

== Key ==
Elected to the Hockey Hall of Fame

#	Number of coaches
GC	Games Coached
W	Wins
L	Loses
T	Ties
Win%	Winning percentage
*	Elected to the Hockey Hall of Fame

== Coaches ==
Coaches with multiple stints as head coach only count once in the official count of head coaches.

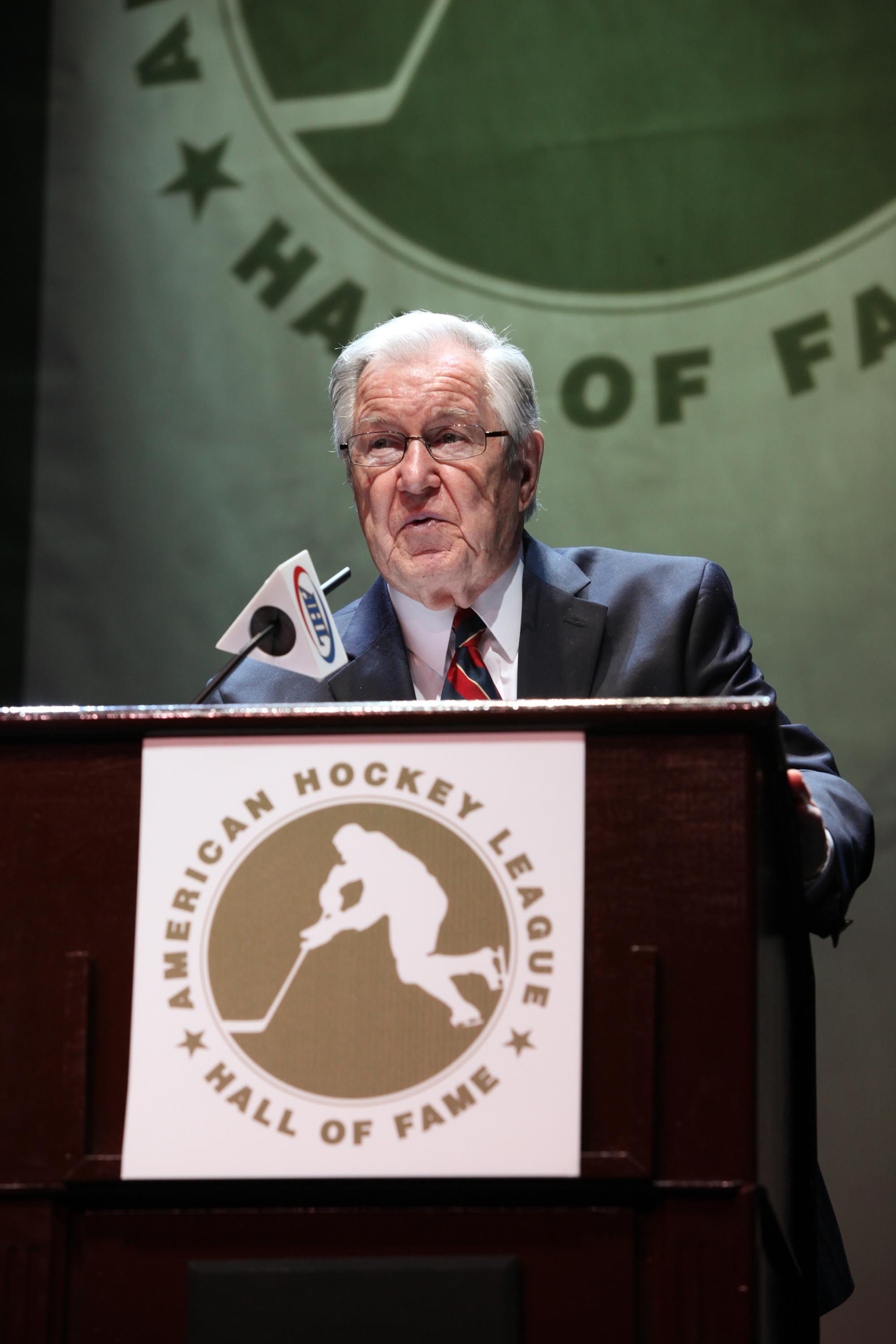
Joe Crozier coached the Sabres from 1972 to 1974.

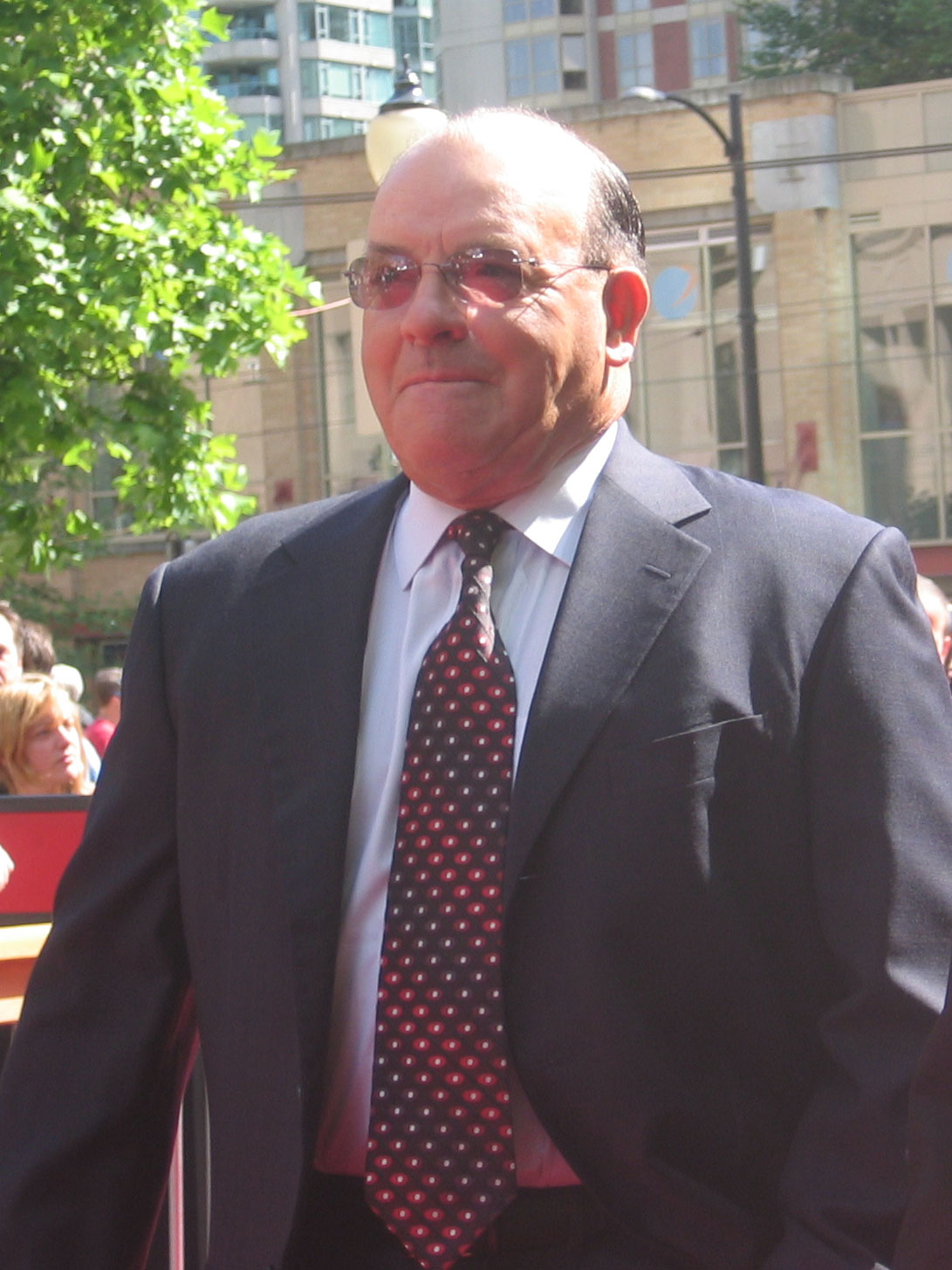
Scotty Bowman was the sixth coach for the Sabres and coached the team from 1979 to 1980, and later from 1982 to 1985.

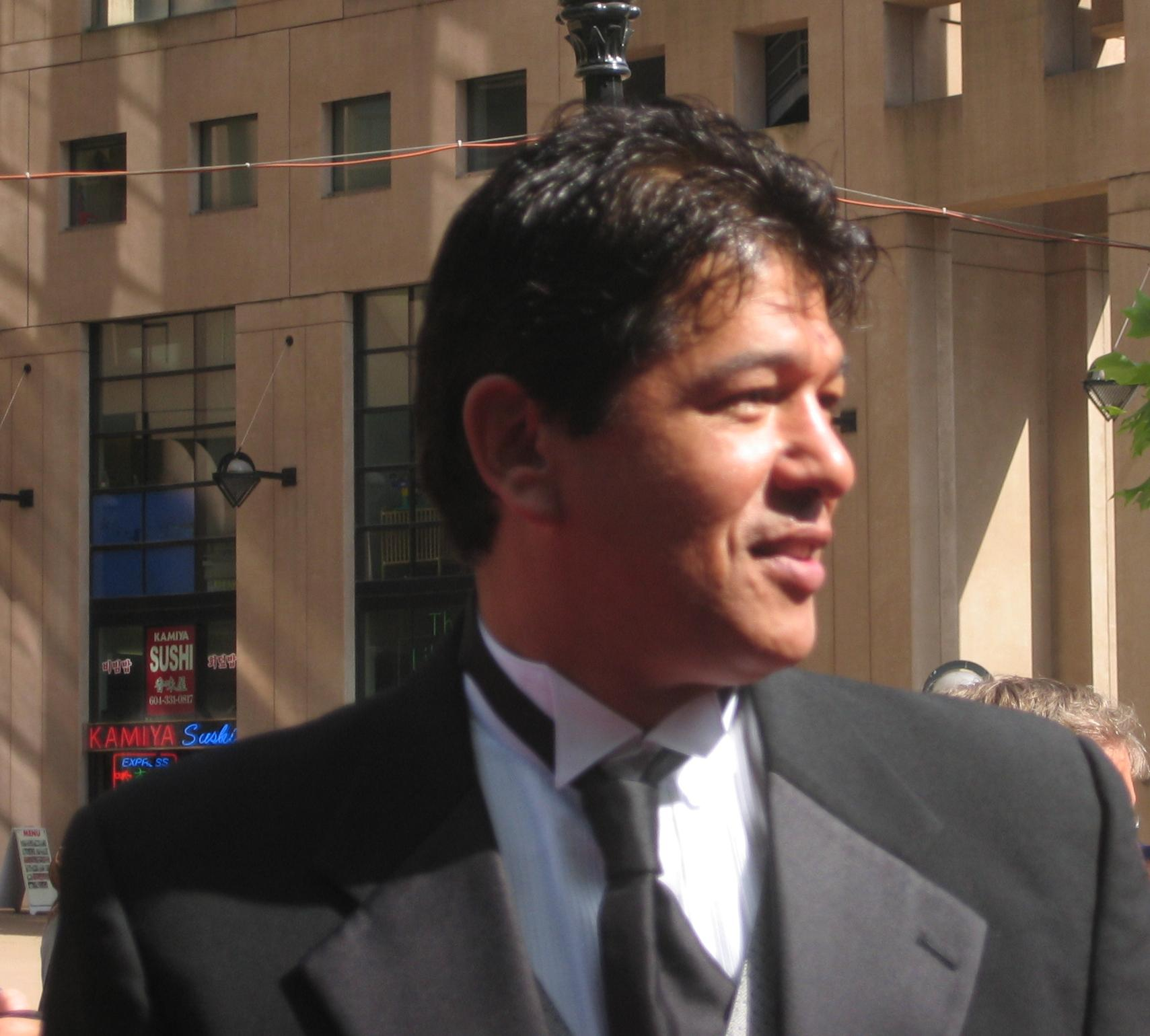
Ted Nolan coached the team from 1995 to 1997, and again from 2013 to 2015.

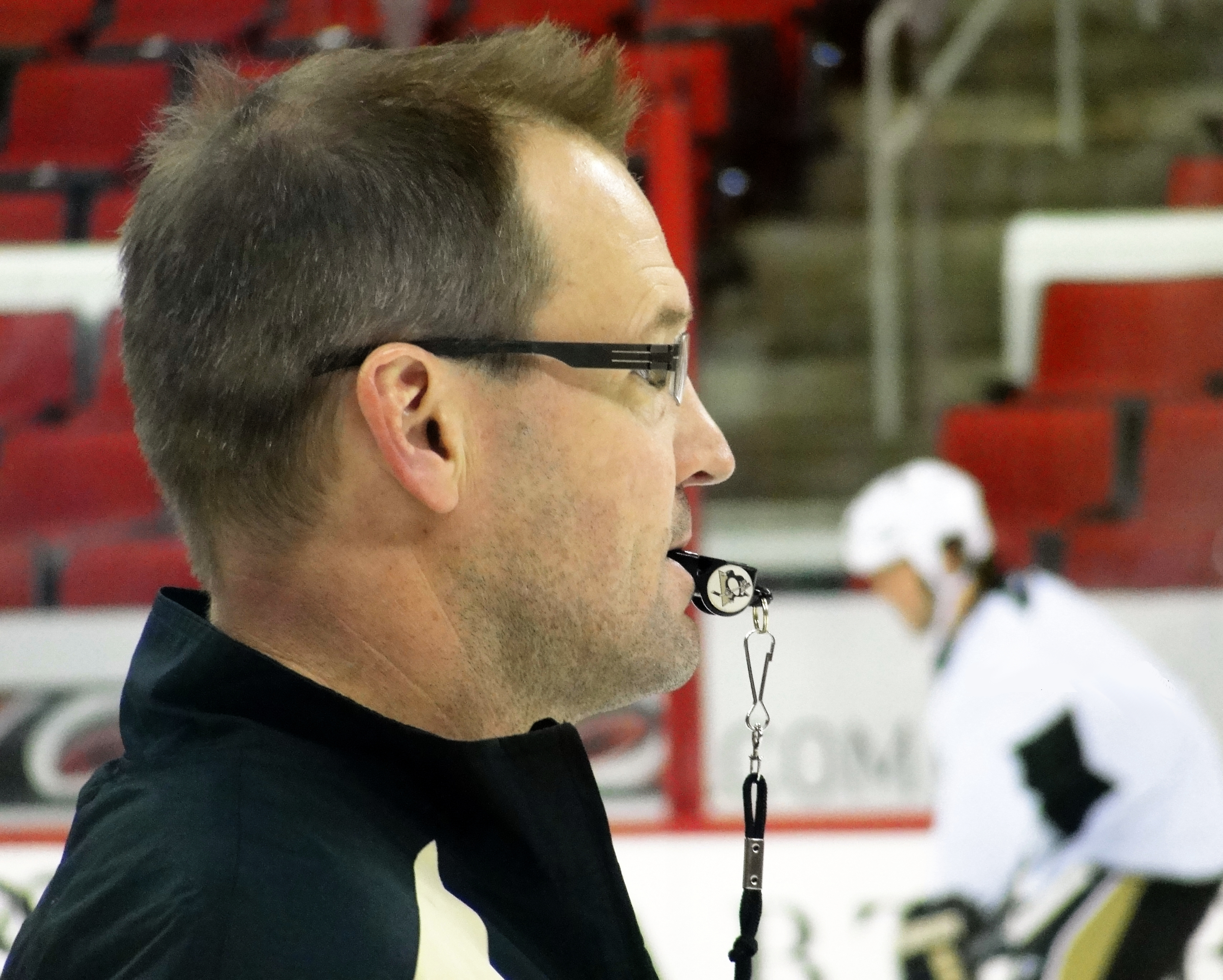
Dan Bylsma coached the team from 2015 to 2017.

#	Name	Term	Regular season					Playoffs				Awards	Reference
#	Name	Term	GC	W	L	T/OTL	Win%	GC	W	L	T	Awards	Reference
1	Punch Imlach	1970–1972	120	32	63	25	.370	—	—	—	—		
2	Floyd Smith	1972	1	0	1	0	.000	—	—	—	—		
3	Joe Crozier	1972–1974	192	77	80	35	.492	6	2	4	0		
—	Floyd Smith	1974–1977	240	143	61	36	.671	32	16	16	0		
4	Marcel Pronovost	1977–1978	104	52	29	23	.611	8	3	5	0		
5	Billy Inglis	1978–1979	56	28	18	10	.589	3	1	2	0		
6	Scotty Bowman	1979–1980	80	47	17	16	.688	14	9	5	0		
7	Roger Neilson	1980–1981	80	39	20	21	.619	8	4	4	0		
8	Jimmy Roberts	1981–1982	45	21	16	8	.556	—	—	—	—		
—	Scotty Bowman	1982–1985	240	124	82	34	.588	22	9	13	0		
9	Jim Schoenfeld	1985–1986	43	19	19	5	.500	—	—	—	—		
—	Scotty Bowman	1986–1986	49	21	25	3	.459	—	—	—	—		
10	Craig Ramsay	1986–1987	68	25	37	6	.412	—	—	—	—		
11	Ted Sator	1987–1989	160	75	67	18	.525	11	3	8	0		
12	Rick Dudley	1989–1991	188	85	82	31	.535	12	4	8	0		
13	John Muckler	1991–1995	268	125	109	34	.530	27	11	16	0		
14	Ted Nolan	1995–1997	164	73	72	19	.503	12	5	7	0	Jack Adams Award	
15	Lindy Ruff	1997–2013	1,165	571	432	162	.560	101	57	44	0	Jack Adams Award	
16	Ron Rolston	2013–2013	51	19	26	6	.373	—	—	—	—		
—	Ted Nolan	2013–2015	144	40	87	17	.337	—	—	—	—		
17	Dan Bylsma	2015–2017	164	68	73	23	.485	—	—	—	—		
18	Phil Housley	2017–2019	164	58	84	22	.421	—	—	—	—		
19	Ralph Krueger	2019–2021	97	36	49	12	.433	—	—	—	—		
20	Don Granato	2021–2024	274	122	125	27	.495	—	—	—	—		
—	Lindy Ruff	2024–present	164	86	62	16	.573	13	7	6			

== See also ==
- List of NHL head coaches
- List of current NHL captains and alternate captains
- List of NHL players
