= Ted Sator =

American ice hockey coach (born 1949)

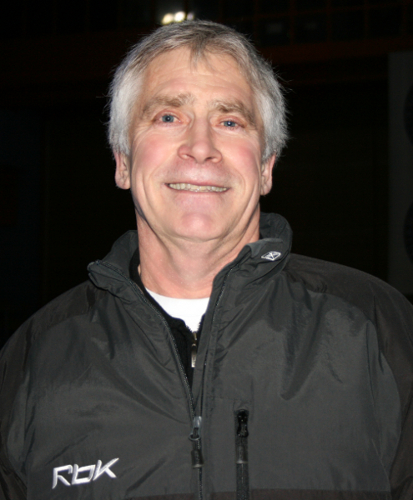
- Born: November 18, 1949 (age 76); New Hartford, New York, U.S.
- Occupation: professional ice hockey coach

Ted Sator (born November 18, 1949) is an American professional ice hockey coach. He has twelve seasons of National Hockey League (NHL) coaching experience, serving as an assistant coach for various teams and head coach of the New York Rangers and Buffalo Sabres. He has also spent time coaching in the American Hockey League (AHL) and ECHL along with coaching in Europe including stints as the Slovenian and Hungarian national ice hockey teams. He is a current assistant men's ice hockey coach at Lindenwood University.

== Playing career ==
Sator played college hockey for Bowling Green State University. During his senior year, the 1971–72 season, for the Falcons, Sator played 27 games, where he tallied 5 goals and assisted on 6 others; helping the Falcons finish the season with a record of 21-10-2. He was also selected to play with the U.S. World Team in Lake Placid, New York. Following his collegiate career, Sator joined the Long Island Ducks of the Eastern Hockey League (EHL) in the following year. Sator's playing career came to an end due to a knee injury after only playing three games for the Ducks.

== Coaching career ==
=== Professional coaching career ===
Sator began his coaching career in the early 1980s, serving as head coach of Rögle BK for the 1982-83 season in the Swedish Division 1 league. That same year he also spent time as a scout for the Philadelphia Flyers of the National Hockey League. Sator joined the Flyers coaching staff the following season, becoming assistant coach under head coach Bob McCammon during the 1983-84 season, and remaining as assistant coach under new head coach Mike Keenan during the 1984–85 season.

At just 35 years of age, Sator was named head coach of the New York Rangers, leading up to the 1985-1986 season. He implemented a buttoned-down defensive style, under which the team finished with a record of 36-38-6, good for fourth place in the Patrick Division. This was the same position the team had finished the prior season, although this time they had improved by 16 points, from 62 to 78. In the playoffs, the team then shocked first the Flyers and then the Washington Capitals, thus making the Conference finals. Now one of four teams left, they lost to the eventual Stanley Cup Champion Montreal Canadiens.

Despite the playoff run, General Manager Craig Patrick, whose contract had expired, was not retained by the Rangers for the following season. He was replaced by Phil Esposito. Speculation regarding Sator's job immediately followed.

Sator's time with the Rangers was not appreciated by many of his charges. Numerous players rebelled against Sator, with both his restrictive style of play as well as his allegedly controlling personality leading three of the team's biggest stars - Mark Pavelich, Reijo Ruotsalainen, and team captain Barry Beck - to simply leave the team and go home. Another star player, popular sniper Pierre Larouche, was benched. Only 19 games into his second season as head coach, the new general manager fired Sator, after the team began the season in last place, posting a 5-10-4 record. He was replaced by Tom Webster.

Sator quickly found a new position when he was named head coach of the Buffalo Sabres for the following year, 1987-1988. In his first full season with the Buffalo Sabres they achieved the biggest point improvement in the NHL. He coached to two third-place finishes but was unable to get the team past the Stanley Cup finalist Boston Bruins in the first round of the Stanley Cup playoffs, and was relieved of his coaching duties in 1989. Sator's time in Buffalo was marked by a dispute with team captain (and future Sabres coach) Lindy Ruff that led to Ruff being traded to the New York Rangers.

Over the next two seasons, Sator was an assistant coach with the Boston Bruins before traveling to Italy to become head coach of the HC Devils Milano of the Serie A in 1991. Sator's team went undefeated on in his first season as head coach of the Devils and won the Serie A championship. Sator led the Devils to back-to-back Serie A league championships when the team won again in 1993. Sator returned to the United States and NHL the following season, taking an assistant coaching position with the St. Louis Blues. After two seasons in St. Louis, Sator spent the next two seasons as assistant coach of the Hartford Whalers, and Vancouver Canucks (where he split time between Vancouver and the Canucks American Hockey League farm team, the Syracuse Crunch. Beginning in 1997, Sator began a successful five year coaching stint with the New Orleans Brass, where he was also Director of Player Personnel. During his tenure with the Brass, the team made the ECHL playoffs every season and never had a losing season record.

Sator returned to Europe after the Brass folded in 2002. Sator became the head coach of the Espoo Blues in the SM-liiga for the 2003-2004 season. From 2007 to 2009 he served as head coach of the Hungarian Austrian Hockey League team Alba Volán Székesfehérvár. In 2009, he was hired as head coach of the KHL Medveščak, based in Zagreb, Croatia. In the team's first season in the Austrian Hockey League the team qualified for last Playoff seed. The team stunned top seeded Graz 99ers in the Quarterfinals, winning the series in six games, before suffering elimination to eventual champions EC Red Bull Salzburg in the semi-finals.

=== Amateur and collegiate coaching career ===
Sator then moved back to St. Louis, Missouri in 2011 and became assistant hockey coach for Lafayette High School, located in Wildwood, Missouri. For the 2011-2012 season, he was hired aas assistant coach of the Lindenwood University men's ice hockey team. He joins the team under head coach Rick Zombo, a former NHL defenseman who played for the St. Louis Blues during Sator's tenure as assistant coach for the Blues in the early 1990s.

=== International coaching career ===
Sator served as Bob Johnson's assistant coach for Team USA on two Canada Cup teams and has sat on the Executive Board of USA Hockey. He was assistant coach with United States men's national ice hockey team in Vienna for the 1996 World Championships where the team took its first medal in 36 years. Sator served as the head coach of the Slovenian national ice hockey team during the 2006-2007 season, bringing them back into the A Pool. Later he obtained a position as the head coach of the Hungarian national ice hockey team from 2009 to 2011.

=== Coaching statistics (NHL head coach) ===
Team	Year	Regular season							Postseason			
Team	Year	G	W	L	T	OTL	Pts	Finish	W	L	Win %	Result
NYR	1985–86	80	36	38	6	–	78	4th in Patrick	8	8	.500	Lost conference finals (MTL)
NYR	1986–87	19	5	10	4	–	14	4th in Patrick	–	–	–	(fired)
BUF	1987–88	80	37	32	11	–	85	3rd in Adams	2	4	.333	Lost division semifinals (BOS)
BUF	1988–89	80	38	35	7	–	83	3rd in Adams	1	4	.250	Lost division semifinals (BOS)
Total		259	116	115	28	–			11	16	.407	

=== Coaching statistics (North American other) ===
Season	Team	League	Type	GP	W	L	T	OTL	PCT	Playoff Result
1983–84	Philadelphia Flyers	NHL	Assistant Coach
1984–85	Philadelphia Flyers	NHL	Assistant Coach
1989–90	Boston Bruins	NHL	Assistant Coach
1990–91	Boston Bruins	NHL	Assistant Coach
1993–94	St. Louis Blues	NHL	Assistant Coach
1994–95	St. Louis Blues	NHL	Assistant Coach
1995–96	Hartford Whalers	NHL	Assistant Coach
1996–97	Syracuse Crunch	AHL	Assistant Coach
1996–97	Vancouver Canucks	NHL	Assistant Coach
1997–98	New Orleans Brass	ECHL	Head coach	70	36	24	10	0	.586	Lost in Round 1
1998–99	New Orleans Brass	ECHL	Head coach	70	30	27	13	0	.521	Lost in Round 3
1999–00	New Orleans Brass	ECHL	Head coach	70	36	27	0	7	.564	Lost in Round 1
2000–01	New Orleans Brass	ECHL	Head coach	72	35	25	12	0	.569	Lost in Round 2
2001–02	New Orleans Brass	ECHL	Head coach	72	36	32	4	0	.528	Lost in Round 1

- Note: Sator was fired after 23 games in the 1986–87 season, and replaced by Tom Webster.
- Note: Sator was the Assistant Coach for Team USA in the Canada Cup in 1984 and 1987.

Preceded by Craig Patrick	Head coach of New York Rangers; 1985–86	Succeeded by Tom Webster
Preceded by Craig Ramsay	Head coach of Buffalo Sabres; 1987–89	Succeeded by Rick Dudley
Preceded by Hannu Kapanen	Head coach of Blues; 2003	Succeeded by Pekka Rautakallio
