= Don Granato =

American ice hockey player & coach (born 1967)

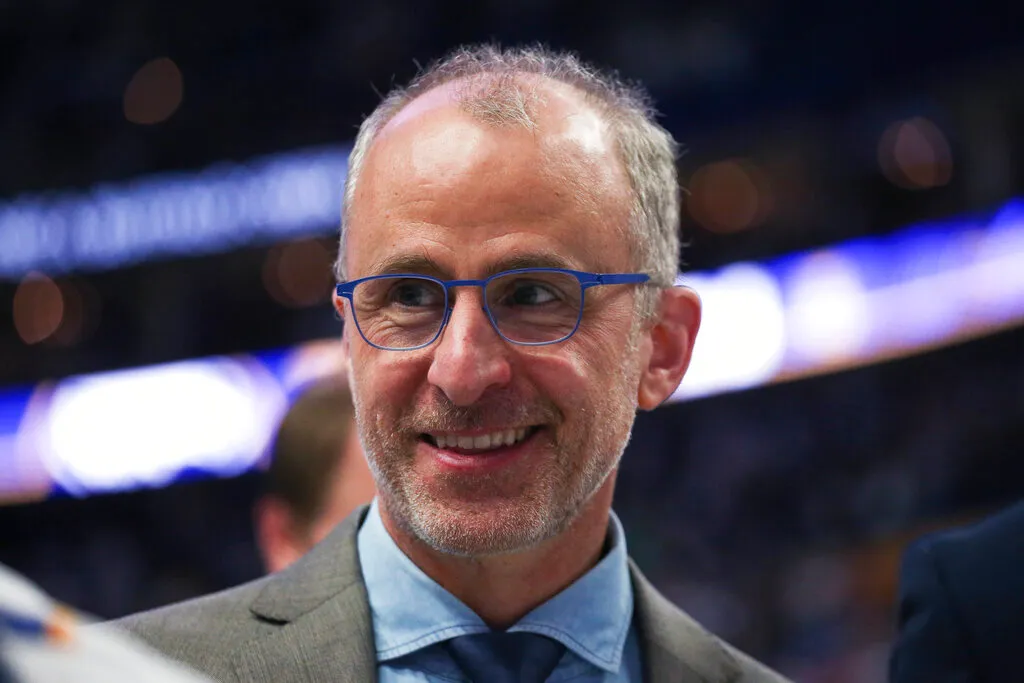
- Granato in April 2022
- Born: August 11, 1967 (age 59) Downers Grove, Illinois, U.S.
- Height: 6 ft 0 in (183 cm)
- Weight: 170 lb (77 kg; 12 st 2 lb)
- Position: Center
- Shot: Right
- Played for: Columbus Chill
- Coached for: Buffalo Sabres
- NHL draft: Undrafted
- Playing career: 1991–1993
- Coaching career: 1993–present

Donald Granato (born August 11, 1967) is an American professional ice hockey coach and former player who currently serves as an assistant coach for the Columbus Blue Jackets of the National Hockey League (NHL).

== Playing career ==
After two years playing with the then named Madison Capitals of the United States Hockey League (USHL), Granato was recruited to play for the University of Wisconsin and played there for four years, winning a national title in the 1989–90 season. During his last year with the team in 1990–91, he served as team's captain. After college he played for two years with the Columbus Chill of the ECHL before retiring as player in order to move into coaching.

== Coaching career ==
Granato served as head coach of the Green Bay Gamblers and Wisconsin Capitols of the United States Hockey League (USHL) from 1993 to 1997, where he led the Gamblers to the league finals. He was then hired by the Columbus Chill of the East Coast Hockey League (ECHL) in 1997 and then Peoria Rivermen in 1999. He won the Kelly Cup as a coach in 2000 with the Peoria Rivermen and was then promoted to head coach of the Worcester IceCats of the American Hockey League (AHL). During the 2000–01 AHL season, Granato won the Louis A. R. Pieri Memorial Award as the most outstanding coach of the AHL. After five seasons with the IceCats, he was promoted to an assistant coach with their National Hockey League (NHL) affiliate, the St. Louis Blues. In 2008, he became head coach of the Chicago Wolves of the AHL but was released in 2009 after seven games.

From 2013 to 2016, he was head coach of the USA Hockey National Team Development Program. In March 2016, Granato assumed an assistant coaching position under his brother, Tony, with the Wisconsin Badgers men's ice hockey team. On June 15, 2017, he became an assistant coach, along with Ulf Samuelsson, under Joel Quenneville of the NHL's Chicago Blackhawks.

In 2019, he was hired as an assistant coach of the Buffalo Sabres. On March 17, 2021, Granato became the interim head coach of the Buffalo Sabres, replacing the fired Ralph Krueger. Granato posted a 9–16–3 record in 28 games with the Sabres to finish off the 2020–21 season head coach. The interim tag was removed on June 29.

During the 2022–23 season, Granato led the Sabres to their first winning season since 2011, despite the team falling one point short of making the playoffs. The Sabres failed to follow up their success the following season, extending their NHL-record playoff drought to 13 consecutive years. Following the 2023–24 season on April 16, 2024, Granato was fired by the Sabres.

On March 25, 2026, Granato was named head coach of the United States men's national ice hockey team that competed at the 2026 IIHF World Championship.

On July 30, 2026, Granato was named an assistant coach for the Columbus Blue Jackets.

== Head coaching record ==
=== NHL ===
Team	Year	Regular season						Postseason			
Team	Year	G	W	L	OTL	Pts	Finish	W	L	Win%	Result
BUF	2020–21	28	9	16	3	(21)	8th in East	—	—	—	Missed playoffs
BUF	2021–22	82	32	39	11	75	5th in Atlantic	—	—	—	Missed playoffs
BUF	2022–23	82	42	33	7	91	5th in Atlantic	—	—	—	Missed playoffs
BUF	2023–24	82	39	37	6	84	6th in Atlantic	—	—	—	Missed playoffs
Total		274	122	125	27			—	—	—	

== Personal life ==
Granato is the brother of Cammi and Tony, and the brother-in-law of Ray Ferraro.

Granato formerly served as an analyst for NHL Network Radio on SiriusXM.

Preceded by Ralph Krueger	Head coach of the Buffalo Sabres; 2021–2024	Succeeded by Lindy Ruff
