= Joe Crozier =

Canadian ice hockey player and coach (1929–2022)

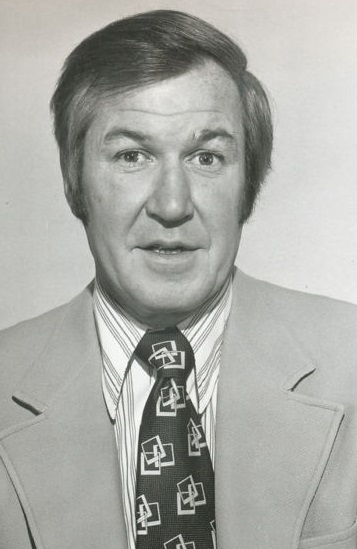
- Crozier in 1973
- Born: February 19, 1929 Winnipeg, Manitoba, Canada
- Died: October 11, 2022 (aged 93) Williamsville, New York, U.S.
- Height: 6 ft 0 in (183 cm)
- Weight: 180 lb (82 kg; 12 st 12 lb)
- Position: Defence
- Shot: Right
- Played for: Toronto Maple Leafs
- Playing career: 1949–1961

Joseph Richard Crozier (February 19, 1929 – October 11, 2022) was a Canadian professional ice hockey defenceman and head coach who played and coached primarily in the minor leagues. After playing the better part of 12 seasons in the minor leagues with the Quebec Aces of the Quebec Senior Hockey League (QSHL), which included a five-game stint in the National Hockey League (NHL) with the Toronto Maple Leafs, Crozier retired in 1961 and became a head coach for 22 years, beginning in 1963. He had also previously been a player-coach for the Aces in 1957–58.

As a head coach in several leagues, Crozier was a three-time Calder Cup champion with the Rochester Americans of the American Hockey League (AHL), a two-time Lester Patrick Cup championship with the Vancouver Canucks of the Western Hockey League, (WHL) and a Memorial Cup champion with the Kitchener Rangers of the Ontario Hockey League (OHL). During his coaching career, he also made brief appearances in the NHL with the Buffalo Sabres for 2 1/2 seasons and the Maple Leafs from the end of 1979–80 to the first half of 1980–81.

In 1985, Crozier was inducted into the Manitoba Hockey Hall of Fame for his efforts, then once again in 2007 as part of a team induction of the Memorial Cup-runners-up 1948–49 Brandon Wheat Kings. Crozier was the father of the professional hockey player, Greg Crozier.

== Playing career ==
A native of Winnipeg, Crozier played junior hockey in the Manitoba Junior Hockey League with the Brandon Wheat Kings. In his first season in 1947–48, he was named to the MJHL Second All-Star Team, then the First All-Star Team the following year. His second and final year in Brandon culminated in an eight-game Memorial Cup final series against the Montreal Royals. The seven-game series was extended an extra game as game three had ended in a 3–3 tie. Although Crozier scored the first goal in the final and deciding eighth game, the Royals scored four times in the third period to defeat the Wheat Kings 6–4. They were later inducted as a team into the Manitoba Hockey Hall of Fame 58 years later in 2007.

Turning professional in 1949 with the San Francisco Shamrocks of the Pacific Coast Hockey League, he began a long career in the minor leagues. After playing a season with the Vancouver Canucks in 1950–51, he joined the Quebec Aces of the Quebec Senior Hockey League. Crozier would remain with the Aces for eight seasons, earning Second All-Star Team honours in 1954 after a 27-point campaign and First Team honours in 1957 after recording 37 points. During the 1957–58 season, Crozier also acted as team head coach.

In 1959–60, Crozier joined the Rochester Americans of the American Hockey League (AHL), then earned a break with the Toronto Maple Leafs of the National Hockey League (NHL). He played five games with the Maple Leafs, his only appearance in the NHL as a player, recording three assists. After his NHL stint, Crozier finished his playing career with the Spokane Spokes of the Western Hockey League in 1959–60 and one more season with the Rochester Americans in 1960–61.

== Coaching career ==
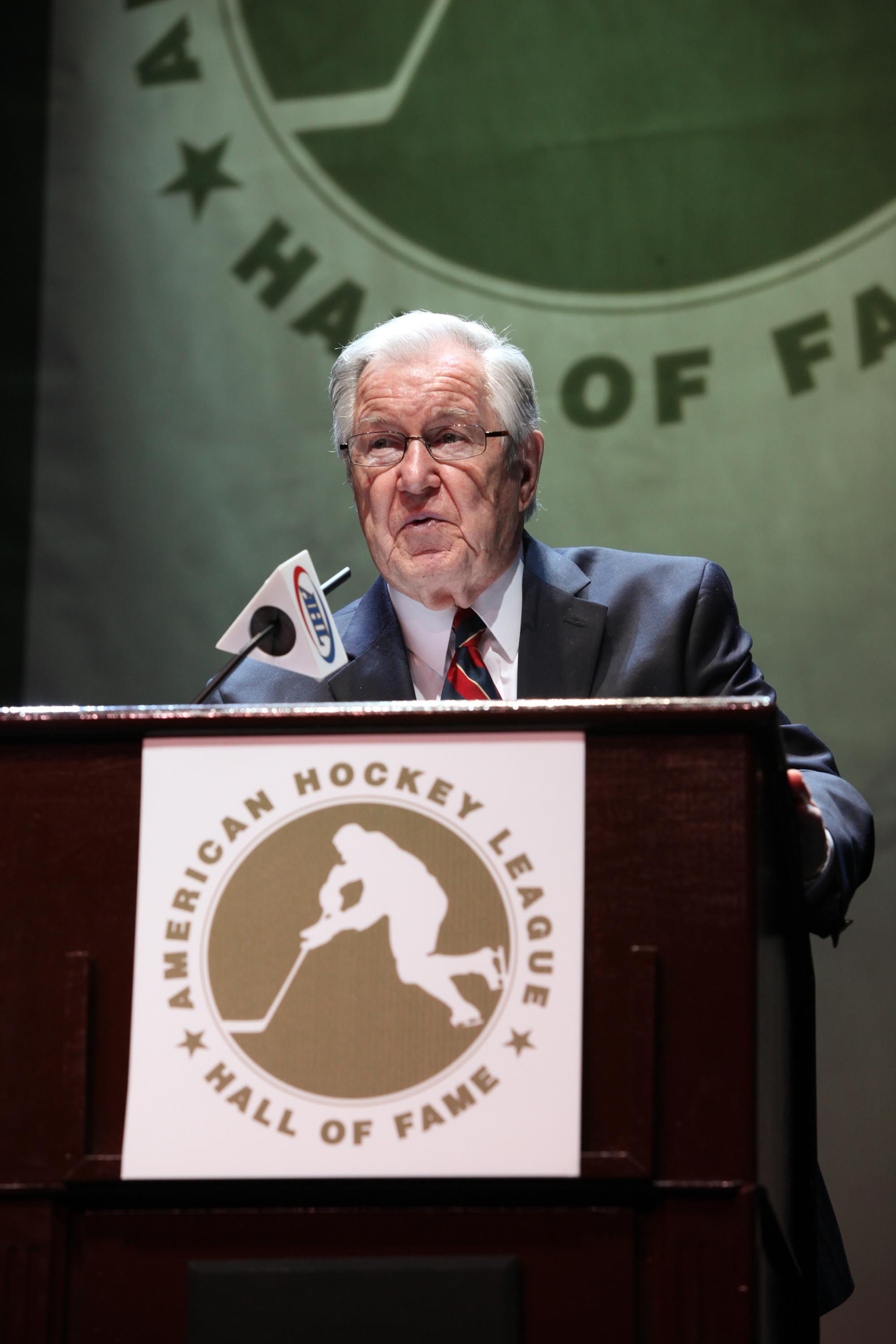
Crozier in 2015

Crozier made his head coaching debut in 1957–58 with the Quebec Aces of the Quebec Senior Hockey League, while still playing defence with the team. Quebec posted a 29–31–4 record. In 1961, he became the head coach and general manager for the Charlotte Checkers of the minor professional Eastern Hockey League. After one season with the Checkers, he rejoined Rochester of the AHL as their coach. In 1965, his second season as head coach of the Americans, he won his first of three Calder Cups, as AHL champion, during five seasons with the team. The directors of the Vancouver Canucks of the Western Hockey League purchased the Americans after the 1967–68 season, and Crozier assigned Dick Gamble to coach for Rochester while he coached for Vancouver. Crozier won two Lester Patrick Cups as WHL champion in his two seasons with Vancouver. In 1971, he became the coach and general manager of the Cincinnati Swords of the AHL.

After a heart attack to Buffalo Sabres coach "Punch" Imlach, Crozier was given Imlach's position and made his National Hockey League coaching debut in 1972. He coached the final 37 games for the Sabres. Imlach stepped down as coach after the season, and Crozier succeeded him. He coached the Sabres to a playoff berth the following season, where the Sabres lost to the Montreal Canadiens. After finishing his third season with the Sabres out of the playoffs, however, he was replaced by Floyd Smith after the 1973–74 season.

Upon leaving the Sabres, he became the general manager of the Vancouver Blazers in the World Hockey Association in 1974–75. The team relocated in 1975, becoming the Calgary Cowboys, and Crozier signed a new five-year contract as coach and general manager. In 1975–76, Crozier made it to the semi-finals with the Cowboys, but lost to the Winnipeg Jets. In his third and final season with the Blazers-Cowboys franchise, in which Calgary failed to make the playoffs, Crozier dumped the team's spare hockey sticks from the bench onto the ice during a game in protest of a disputed call. Another incident with the Cowboys involves a mishap while trying to return to Calgary after a game against the San Diego Mariners. The pilot had failed to refuel and there was not enough gas to return home. Although Crozier asked the team to collectively pitch in, they still did not have enough money. The team was bailed out by their play-by-play announcer who used his wife's Texaco card to front the $1,500 bill. During his stint with the franchise, Crozier also rose to the position of general manager.

In 1980–81, Crozier was named to coach the Maple Leafs in the NHL. However, the Leafs started with 13 wins in the first 40 games. After a five-game losing streak in January, Crozier was replaced mid-season with Mike Nykoluk.

After his second NHL stint, Crozier joined the Kitchener Rangers of the major junior Ontario Hockey League in September 1981 as their coach and general manager, replacing Orval Tessier. The Rangers had just come off a Memorial Cup final game loss to the Cornwall Royals the previous season. In his first season with the team, they returned to the Memorial Cup, winning the J. Ross Robertson Cup as the OHL champion. The Rangers made it to the 1982 Memorial Cup Final and defeated the Sherbrooke Castors 7–4 to capture Crozier and the Rangers' first Canadian Hockey League title.

Coming off their Memorial Cup championship, Crozier and the Rangers finished with a 45–23–2 record in 1982–83, but fell to the Sault Ste. Marie Greyhounds in the third round. After two seasons with the Rangers, Crozier quit following a contract dispute. He returned to the Rochester Americans for one season, in which they reached the 1984 Calder Cup Final against the Maine Mariners, but lost in five games. Crozier then retired after the 1983–84 season. Crozier was inducted into the Manitoba Hockey Hall of Fame in 1985 for his efforts. He was elected to the American Hockey League Hall of Fame, Class of 2012, for his career as a player and coach.

== Coaching record ==
Team	Year	Regular season							Postseason
Team	Year	G	W	L	T	OTL	Pts	Finish	Result
BUF (NHL)	1971–72	36	8	19	9	-	(51)	6th in East	Did not qualify
BUF (NHL)	1972–73	78	37	27	14	-	88	4th in East	Lost in quarter-finals (2–4 vs. MTL)
BUF (NHL)	1973–74	78	32	34	12	-	76	5th in East	Did not qualify
VAN (WHA)	1974–75	78	37	39	2	-	76	4th in Canadian	Did not qualify
CGY (WHA)	1975–76	80	41	35	4	-	86	3rd in Canadian	Won in quarter-finals (4–1 vs. QUE); Lost in semi-finals (1–4 vs. WPG)
CGY (WHA)	1976–77	81	31	43	7	-	69	5th in West	Did not qualify
TOR (NHL)	1980–81	40	13	22	5	-	(71)	5th in Adams	Fired
BUF Total		192	77	80	35	-	189		2–4 (0.333)
TOR Total		40	13	22	5	-	31		0–0 (0.000)
NHL Total		232	90	102	40	-	220		2–4 (0.333)
CGY Total		161	72	78	11	-	155		5–5 (0.500)
VAN Total		78	37	39	2	-	76		0–0 (0.000)
WHA Total		239	109	117	13	-	231		5–5 (0.500)

== Awards and achievements ==
Playing career

- MJHL Second All-Star Team – 1948
- MJHL First All-Star Team – 1949
- QHL Second All-Star Team – 1954
- QHL First All-Star Team – 1957

Coaching career

- Calder Cup (AHL championship; Rochester Americans) – 1965, 1967, 1968
- J. Ross Robertson Cup (OHL championship; Kitchener Rangers) – 1982
- Memorial Cup (CHL championship; Kitchener Rangers) – 1982

Manitoba Hockey Hall of Fame

- Inducted for individual efforts – 1985
- Inducted as part of 1948–49 Brandon Wheat Kings – 2007

American Hockey League Hall of Fame – 2012

== Personal life ==
Crozier was married twice. He had five children and 11 grandchildren. His son, Greg, also played hockey professionally.

Crozier died on October 11, 2022.

Sporting positions
Preceded by Floyd Smith	Head coach of the Buffalo Sabres; 1971–74	Succeeded by Floyd Smith
Preceded by Andy Bathgate	Head coach of the Vancouver Blazers/Calgary Cowboys; 1974–77	Succeeded by none
Preceded by Punch Imlach	Head coach of the Toronto Maple Leafs; 1980–81	Succeeded by Mike Nykoluk
