= Ron Rolston =

American ice hockey coach (born 1966)

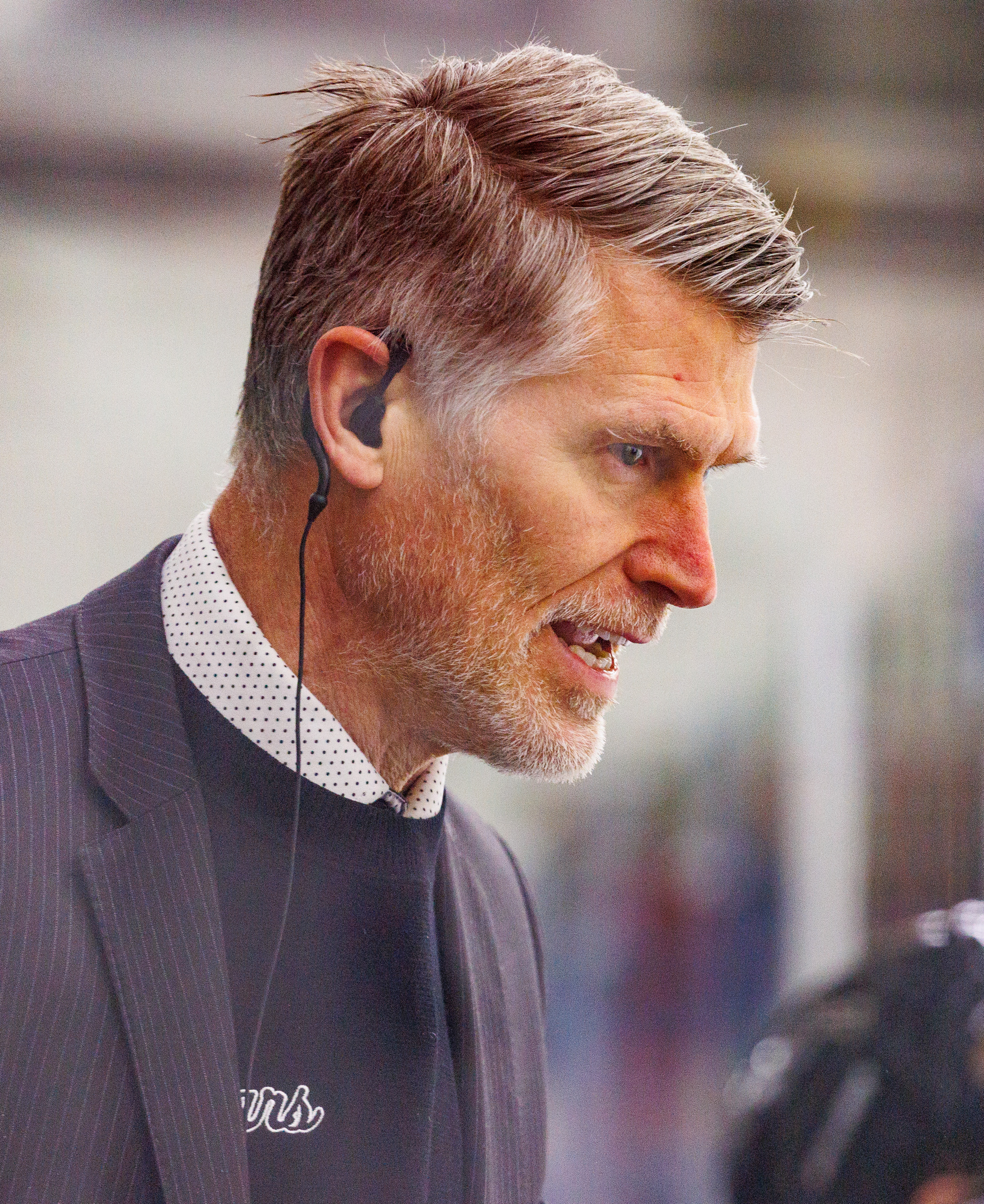

Current position
- Title: Associate head coach
- Team: Providence
- Conference: Hockey East

Biographical details
- Born: October 14, 1966 (age 60); Fenton, Michigan, U.S.
- Education: Michigan Technological University

Coaching career (HC unless noted)
- 1990-1995: Lake Superior State (assistant)
- 1996-1999: Clarkson (assistant)
- 1999-2002: Harvard (assistant)
- 2002-2004: Boston College (assistant)
- 2004-2011: U.S. NTDP
- 2011-2013: Rochester Americans
- 2013: Buffalo Sabres
- 2014-2015: Arizona Coyotes (scout)
- 2015-2016: Springfield Falcons
- 2017- present: Providence (AHC)

Accomplishments and honors

Awards
- NCAA National Championships in 1992 and 1994 with Lake Superior State University, (3) gold and (1) silver medal at the IIHF U-18 Championships, 2011 Bob Johnson Award recipient, which recognizes excellence in international competition during a season

Ronald Rolston (born October 14, 1966) is an American ice hockey coach who is currently Associate Head Coach at Providence College. He was previously the head coach of the Buffalo Sabres of the National Hockey League.

He has served as head coach of USA Hockey's National Team Development Program and was an assistant hockey coach at Boston College, Harvard University, Clarkson University, and Lake Superior State University, as well as head coach of the AHL team, the Rochester Americans.

On February 20, 2013, Rolston was named as the interim head coach of the Sabres, replacing Lindy Ruff, for the remainder of the 2012–13 season. On May 7, 2013, the Sabres announced they were removing the interim tag from Rolston and officially named him the 16th head coach in franchise history. Amid poor performance at the start of the 2013-14 season and a change in direction by ownership, the Sabres dismissed Rolston from his post on November 13, 2013. On September 17, 2014, the Coyotes announced they had hired Rolston as a pro scout. On June 18, 2015, the Coyotes announced that Rolston had been promoted to head coach of their AHL affiliate, the Springfield Falcons.

== Playing career ==
Rolston played 3 years with Michigan Technological University, scoring 32 goals and 68 points in 110 games.

== Coaching career ==
Years	Team	League
1990–95	Lake Superior State University	CCHA
1996–99	Clarkson University	ECAC
1999–02	Harvard University	ECAC
2002–04	Boston College	Hockey East
2004–11	United States National Team Dev. Program (USNTDP)	USHL
2011–13	Rochester Americans	AHL
2013	Buffalo Sabres	NHL
2015–16	Springfield Falcons	AHL

=== NHL coaching statistics ===
Team	Year	Regular season						Post season
Team	Year	G	W	L	OTL	Pts	Finish	Result
Buffalo Sabres	2012–13	31	15	11	5	(35)	5th in Northeast	Missed Playoffs
Buffalo Sabres	2013–14	20	4	15	1	(9)	8th in Atlantic	Fired
NHL Total		51	19	26	6			

== Career highlights ==
- Guided the Amerks to a 36-26-10-4 record and a berth in the Calder Cup Playoffs in 2011-12, his first season behind the Rochester bench
- A 2011 Bob Johnson Award recipient, which recognizes excellence in international competition during a season
- Winningest coach in the history of USA Hockey's Nation Team Development Program (NTDP)
- A three-time gold-medal winner at the International Ice Hockey Federation U-18 World Championships in 2005, 2009 and most recently in 2011
- During the 2010-11 season, he led Team USA to titles in the 2011 Five Nations Tournament and in the 2010 Four Nations Cup
- Led the U.S. National Under-17 team to the 2009-10 campaign World Hockey Challenge title, its first since 2002
- In 2008-09, led the U.S. National Under-18 Team to first-place finishes at both the 2008 Men's Under-18 Four Nations Cup in Lake Placid, N.Y., and 2009 Under-18 Five Nations Tournament in Sweden
- Also served as HC coach for the U.S. National Junior Team on two occasions, helping Team USA to a bronze medal at the 2007 IIHF World Junior Championship in Sweden
- Led Team USA to a silver medal at the 2007 IIHF U-18 tournament
- Won NCAA National Championships in 1992 and 1994 with Lake Superior State University, a team he also guided to three straight appearances in the NCAA National Championship game and four CCHA tournament titles in his five-year stint
- Perhaps the most decorated coach in NTDP history, Rolston-led teams have never missed the championship game in either of the major NTDP tournaments, the World Under-17 Hockey Challenge and International Ice Hockey Federation World Under-18 Championship. In the 4 IIHF U-18 Championships that he his teams have competed in, they have brought home 3 golds and a silver medal.
- In July 2011, he was hired by the Buffalo Sabres to be the head coach of their affiliate team, the Rochester Americans in the American Hockey League .
- In February 2013, named interim head coach of the Sabres after the firing of Lindy Ruff.
- Officially named head coach of the Sabres on May 7, 2013, removing the interim tag. He was fired from Buffalo on November 13, 2013.

== Personal ==
Rolston and his wife, Shannon, have two children, Maeve and Ronan. He is the older brother of Brian Rolston.

Preceded by Lindy Ruff	Head Coach of the Buffalo Sabres; 2013	Succeeded by Ted Nolan
