= Ralph Krueger =

German ice hockey player and coach

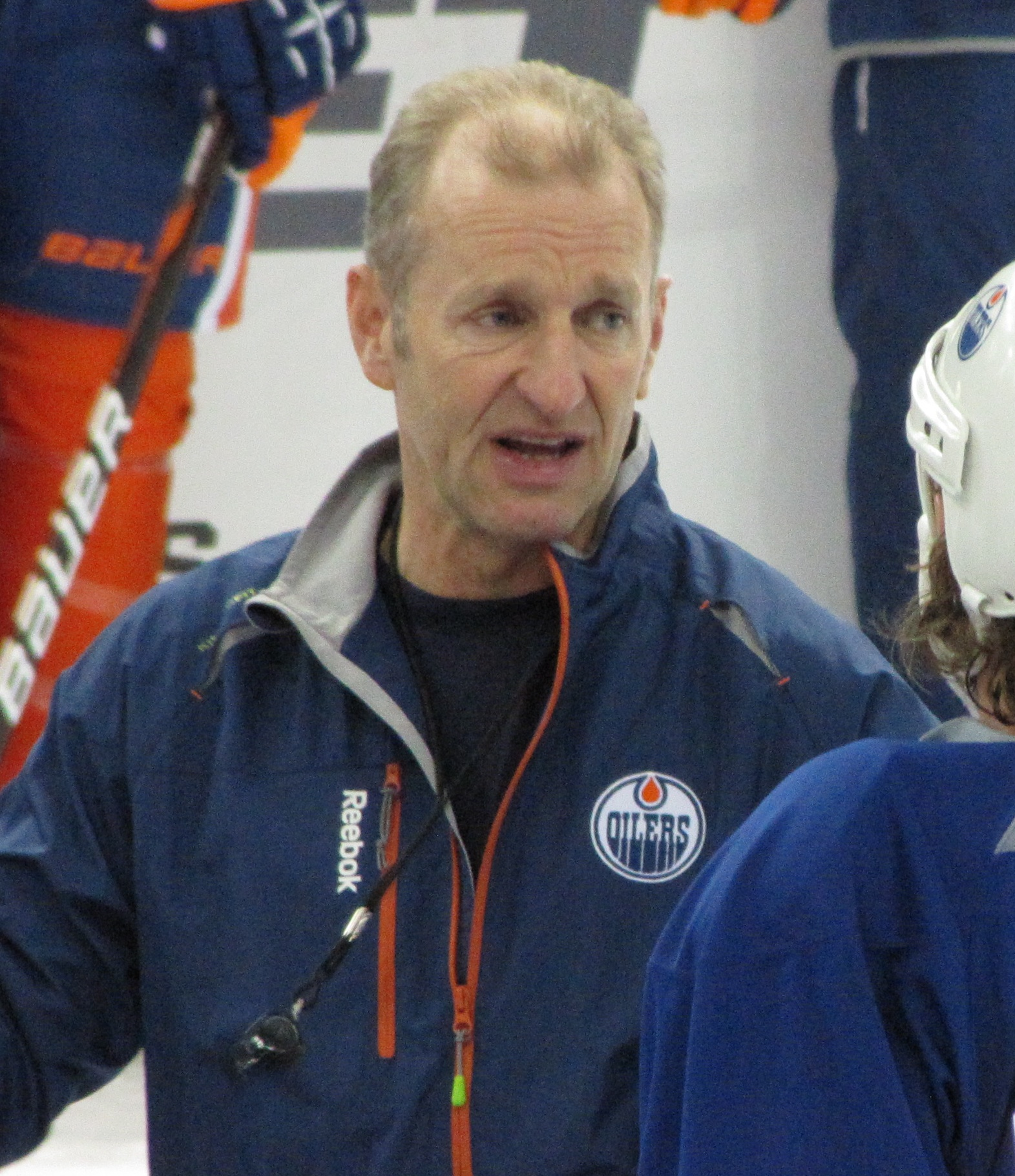
- Krueger in 2013

Chairman of Southampton F.C.
- In office 12 March 2014 – 12 April 2019
- Preceded by: Katharina Liebherr
- Succeeded by: Martin Semmens

Personal details
- Born: 31 August 1959 (age 67) Winnipeg, Manitoba, Canada
- Children: Justin Krueger
- Occupation: Sportsman
Ice hockey career
- Height: 6 ft 0 in (183 cm)
- Weight: 190 lb (86 kg; 13 st 8 lb)
- Position: Right wing
- Shot: Right
- Played for: Düsseldorfer EG; Schwenninger ERC; SC Riessersee; ECD Iserlohn; Sportbund DJK Rosenheim
- Coached for: Edmonton Oilers; Buffalo Sabres
- National team: West Germany
- NHL draft: Undrafted
- Playing career: 1978–1991
- Coaching career: 1992–2021

Ralph Krueger (born 31 August 1959) is a Canadian-born German professional ice hockey coach and former player. He is the former head coach of the Edmonton Oilers and Buffalo Sabres of the National Hockey League (NHL), and former chairman of Southampton Football Club. Since April 2019, he has held a Swiss passport.

He was head coach of the Swiss men's national ice hockey team from the 1997–98 season until the end of the XXI Olympic Winter Games in 2010 and the Edmonton Oilers of the National Hockey League (NHL) during the 2012–13 season. He was inducted into the IIHF Hall of Fame in 2026.

In 2014, Krueger shifted from hockey to the world of association football, to become director of English Premier League team Southampton. On 12 March 2014, Krueger was appointed the chairman of Southampton F.C. In April 2019, Krueger left the club to return to hockey full time. He is also known for his involvement in the World Economic Forum, where since 2011 he has been a Member, Global Agenda Council on New Models of Leadership.

== Playing career ==
Krueger came to Germany in the late 1970s, joining second-division side Duisburger SC. After one year, he returned to Canada, but was back in Germany in 1980 and stayed there for the remainder of his playing days. He played in 350 games of the German Bundesliga, accumulating 187 goals and 186 assists. In the 1980–81 season, as a member of Düsseldorfer EG, he led the league in scoring during the playoffs, with 22 points. He also played 45 games for the West Germany national team.

== Coaching career ==
Krueger began his coaching career as an assistant with EV Duisburg of the German second league. Between 1994 and 1998, he led VEU Feldkirch to five straight Austrian championships, culminating in Feldkirch becoming champions in 1998 of the European Hockey League, made up of the champions of various European leagues. This experience later encouraged him to author a motivational book. After the successes with the Austrian team, he took over as full-time head coach of the Swiss national ice hockey team, having split his time between Feldkirch and Switzerland in 1998. His tenure with the Swiss national team has also seen some notable successes. He led the team to appearances at the 2002, 2006 and 2010 Olympic Games and to several World Championship appearances. Krueger was also a scouting consultant for the Carolina Hurricanes.

Krueger spoke at the World Hockey Summit in 2010, and addressed the need to co-ordinate International Ice Hockey Federation and National Hockey League events. He suggested that the World Cup of Hockey be played every four years, alternating with the Olympic Games every two years. He wanted to see the Ice Hockey World Championships became an under-23 event during Olympic years. He felt it would be beneficial to national teams to evaluate their younger talent at the international level. He wanted to resurrect the Champions Hockey League and Victoria Cup competitions, which he felt would make the game more popular in Europe.

Krueger joined the Oilers as associate coach in 2010. Although during his time with the Swiss team, Krueger was known as a defensive-minded coach, he has also demonstrated the ability to deliver the offensive style of game. This was confirmed by his performance as coach for VEU Feldkirch in Austria. The book he authored (in German, also translated into French), called Teamlife - Beyond Setbacks to Success, was devoted to handling problems in life, and became a bestseller.

The Oilers promoted Krueger to head coach for the 2012–13 NHL season, but he was relieved of his duties after only one season. Hockey Canada subsequently added Krueger as a special adviser to its coaching staff for the 2014 Winter Olympics.

Krueger was chosen to coach Team Europe in the 2016 World Cup of Hockey.

On 15 May 2019, Krueger returned to the NHL as the head coach of the Buffalo Sabres. The Sabres fired Krueger on 17 March 2021. At the time, the Sabres were on a 12-game winless streak and held the worst record in the league.

Krueger was inducted into the IIHF Hall of Fame in 2026.

=== Soccer ===
In 2014, Krueger made the switch from ice hockey to soccer, becoming a director of Southampton in February 2014. Shortly after, he was appointed chairman of the club. He was dismissed on April 12, 2019; set to leave on June 30 when his contract expired.

== Personal life ==
Born in Winnipeg, Krueger was raised in Steinbach, Manitoba. His parents were immigrants from Germany. He attended St. John's-Ravenscourt School where he played hockey as a centre. His son Justin was a member of the Charlotte Checkers of the American Hockey League and now plays for SC Bern. Justin played for Germany's men's national ice hockey team at the 2017 IIHF World Championship.

In April 2019, Krueger, his wife and daughter received Swiss citizenship.

== Career statistics ==
=== Regular season and playoffs ===
			Regular season					Playoffs
Season	Team	League	GP	G	A	Pts	PIM	GP	G	A	Pts	PIM
1976–77	Assiniboine Park Monarchs	MJHL	43	26	30	56	20	—	—	—	—	—
1977–78	Duisburger SC	FRG.2	—	—	—	—	—	—	—	—	—	—
1978–79	New Westminster Bruins	WHL	3	2	0	2	10	—	—	—	—	—
1978–79	Calgary Wranglers	WHL	62	28	55	83	79	14	7	5	12	4
1979–80	Düsseldorfer EG	1.GBun	—	—	—	—	—	—	—	—	—	—
1980–81	Düsseldorfer EG	1.GBun	36	42	39	81	35	11	10	12	22	6
1981–82	Düsseldorfer EG	1.GBun	38	26	40	66	57	2	1	1	2	0
1982–83	Schwenninger ERC	1.GBun	36	20	20	40	50	—	—	—	—	—
1983–84	Schwenninger ERC	1.GBun	36	18	19	37	19	—	—	—	—	—
1984–85	SC Riessersee	1.GBun	35	16	13	29	28	—	—	—	—	—
1985–86	ECD Iserlohn	1.GBun	46	36	29	65	44	—	—	—	—	—
1986–87	Düsseldorfer EG	1.GBun	44	26	24	50	50	—	—	—	—	—
1987–88	Düsseldorfer EG	1.GBun	43	14	22	36	32	—	—	—	—	—
1988–89	Krefelder EV 1981	FRG.2	33	30	30	60	54	18	13	14	27	6
1989–90	Duisburger SV	FRG.2	35	41	36	77	20	18	16	20	36	26
1990–91	Duisburger SV	GER.2	14	10	4	14	4	—	—	—	—	—
1990–91	EC Ratingen	GER.2	30	23	24	47	31	—	—	—	—	—
1.GBun totals			313	198	206	404	314	13	11	13	24	6

=== International ===
Year	Team	Event	GP	G	A	Pts	PIM
1981	West Germany	WC	8	0	1	1	4
1986	West Germany	WC	8	0	1	1	0
Senior totals			16	0	2	2	4

== Head coaching record ==
=== NHL ===
Team	Year	Regular season						Postseason			
Team	Year	G	W	L	OTL	Pts	Finish	W	L	Win%	Result
EDM	2012–13	48	19	22	7	45	3rd in Northwest	—	—	—	Missed playoffs
BUF	2019–20	69	30	31	8	68	6th in Atlantic	—	—	—	Missed playoffs
BUF	2020–21	28	6	18	4	(16)	(fired)	—	—	—	—
Total		145	55	71	19			—	—	—	

== Bibliography ==
- Ralph Krueger: Teamlife - Über Niederlagen zum Erfolg [German]; Werd Verlag, Zürich 2001; ISBN 3859323571

Preceded by Tom Renney	Head coach of the Edmonton Oilers; 2012–13	Succeeded by Dallas Eakins
Preceded by Phil Housley	Head coach of the Buffalo Sabres; 2019–2021	Succeeded by Don Granato (interim)
