= Floyd Smith (ice hockey) =

Canadian ice hockey player and coach

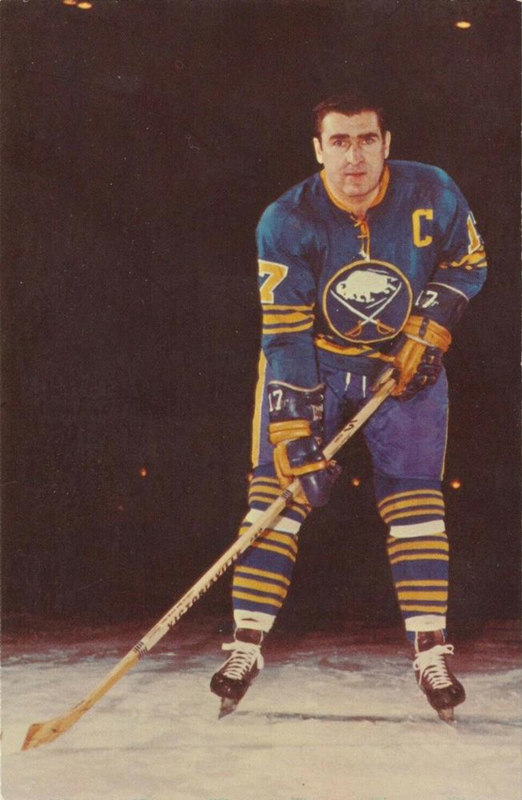
- Smith in 1971 postcard as the first captain of the Buffalo Sabres
- Born: May 16, 1935 (age 91) Perth, Ontario, Canada
- Height: 5 ft 10 in (178 cm)
- Weight: 180 lb (82 kg; 12 st 12 lb)
- Position: Right Wing
- Shot: Right
- Played for: Boston Bruins; New York Rangers; Detroit Red Wings; Toronto Maple Leafs; Buffalo Sabres
- Playing career: 1954–1972

Floyd Robert Donald Smith (born May 16, 1935) is a Canadian former professional ice hockey centre and coach. Smith played 616 total games in the National Hockey League (NHL), doing so for the Boston Bruins, New York Rangers, Detroit Red Wings, Toronto Maple Leafs, and the Buffalo Sabres.

He was the first team captain of the expansion team Sabres in 1970, serving the position until he stopped playing early in the 1971-72 season to become an assistant coach. He coached the AHL affiliate Cincinnati Swords and won the Calder Cup with them in 1973. He was hired to coach the Sabres in 1974, where he led them to the Stanley Cup Final in 1975, where they lost to the Philadelphia Flyers in six games. After consecutive second round losses, he was fired in 1977. He coached the Cincinnati Stingers of the World Hockey Association in their final season in 1978. He was hired to coach the Toronto Maple Leafs in 1979 before a car accident in March 1980 saw him step away from his duties. He remained with the team as a scout and later served as general manager from 1989 to 1991.

== Biography ==
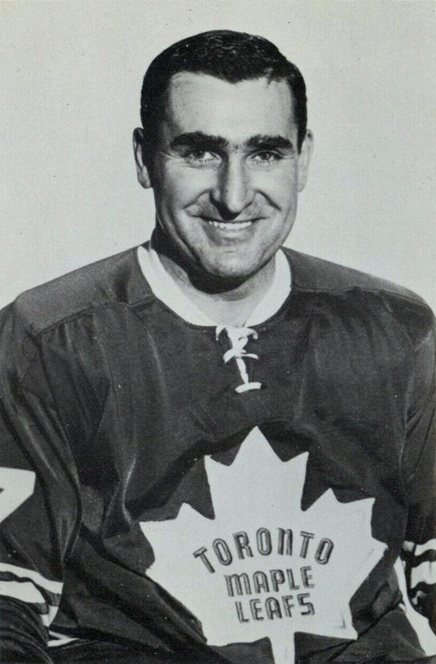
Smith in his playing days for Toronto Maple Leafs in 1968

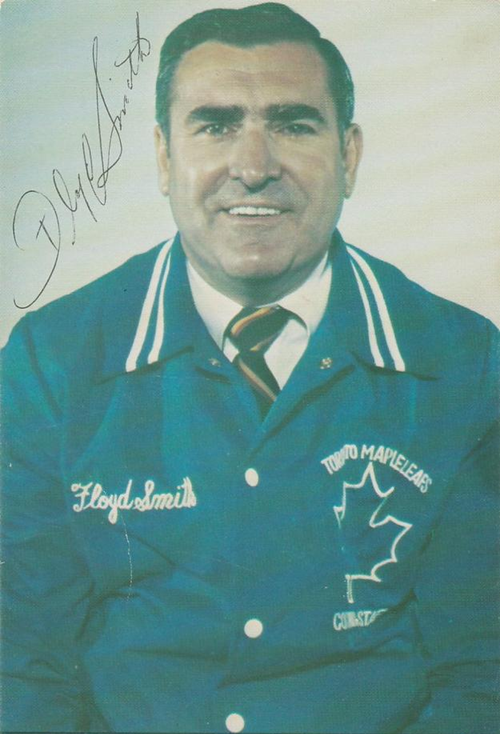
1979 postcard of Smith as coach of the Maple Leafs

Smith grew up in Galt, Ontario, playing junior hockey with the Galt Black Hawks. He made his National Hockey League debut for the Boston Bruins, playing 3 games with the team in 1955, but he was mostly mired in the minors during the early portion of his career. He played 23 games with Boston over the next two seasons, while serving as a significant contributor on the Hershey Bears club. Smith then spent five years with the New York Rangers organization, reaching the NHL for a 29-game stint in 1961. During this period, he was a dominant force with the Springfield Indians, scoring 82 points in 71 games in 1960.

In 1963, Smith finally earned a chance to become an NHL regular after being acquired by the Detroit Red Wings. He scored an NHL career-high 49 points during the 1965–66 season. He was part of a six-player blockbuster transaction in which he was traded along with Norm Ullman and Paul Henderson from the Red Wings to the Toronto Maple Leafs for Frank Mahovlich, Pete Stemkowski and Garry Unger on March 4, 1968. The Maple Leafs and Red Wings were in fifth and sixth place respectively at the bottom of the East Division standings at the time of the deal. He was selected by the Buffalo Sabres during the 1970 expansion draft and head coach Punch Imlach named Smith as the team's first captain. He took the ceremonial faceoff for the Sabres against Jean Beliveau of the Montreal Canadiens in the opening home game in Buffalo on October 15, 1970.

Smith played a few games in the 1971-72 season as a player/assistant coach. A heart attack suffered by Imlach saw Joe Crozier be promoted from the AHL affiliate Cincinnati Swords while Smith retired as a player to become coach of the Swords. He won a Calder Cup with the team in 1973. In 1974, he became Buffalo's head coach after Crozier had a falling out with Imlach. The team roared to a record of 49–16–15, which saw them have a 22-game stretch with just one loss and a 12-game winning streak in February as the Sabres finished with 113 points for a tie with Montreal and Philadelphia. The Sabres faced the Canadiens in the semifinals, winning the first two games only for Montreal to win the next two. The Sabres held it together and won the next two games, which included Game 6 in Montreal to reach their first ever Stanley Cup Final in only their fifth year of existence; notably, a crowd of roughly 15,000 came to greet the team at the Buffalo Niagara International Airport. The Sabres were eliminated in the second round the next two years, and he came to terms on a “mutual agreement” with Punch Imlach to step down, with Imlach later being quoted as stating that Smith "wasn't motivating the players."

He became coach of the World Hockey Association's Cincinnati Stingers for the 1978–79 season. He was hired to coach the Toronto Maple Leafs in 1979, where he coached the first 68 games of the 1979–80 season. On March 14, 1980, while driving in Pennsylvania after a practice had been held in Grand Island, New York, Smith was involved in an accident when his car crossed a highway median that saw two people killed and Smith suffer cuts, bruises, and a broken kneecap. Dick Duff coached the following two games before Imlach took over as interim coach for the remainder of the season. Smith was charged by the Ontario Provincial Police for impaired driving and criminal negligence, with the latter charge being dropped. He remained with the Leafs as a scout until being promoted to general manager, a position he held for the 1989–90 and 1990–91 seasons; likely the most noted trade done by Smith involved trading for Tom Kurvers from the New Jersey Devils on October 16, 1989 for a first-round pick in the 1991 NHL entry draft, which the Devils used to draft Scott Niedermayer. He served as a scout until he was let go in April 2001.

Smith resides in southern Erie County, New York; he was part of the celebrations of the home opener for the 50th season in 2019 that saw him drop the puck for the ceremonial faceoff prior to the game versus the New Jersey Devils.

== Career statistics ==
			Regular season					Playoffs
Season	Team	League	GP	G	A	Pts	PIM	GP	G	A	Pts	PIM
1952–53	Galt Black Hawks	OHA-Jr.	6	0	1	1	0	—	—	—	—	—
1953–54	Ottawa Eastviews	M-Cup	—	—	—	—	—	12	8	9	17	0
1954–55	Boston Bruins	NHL	3	1	0	1	0	—	—	—	—	—
1964–55	Galt Black Hawks	OHA-Jr.	46	29	40	69	60	4	1	4	5	0
1955–56	Hershey Bears	AHL	49	10	19	29	31	—	—	—	—	—
1956–57	Boston Bruins	NHL	23	0	0	0	6	—	—	—	—	—
1956–57	Hershey Bears	AHL	41	12	25	37	32	6	0	1	1	8
1957–58	Springfield Indians	AHL	70	25	50	75	60	13	2	11	13	4
1958–59	Springfield Indians	AHL	68	25	32	57	34	—	—	—	—	—
1959–60	Springfield Indians	AHL	71	31	51	82	26	10	1	5	6	10
1960–61	New York Rangers	NHL	29	5	9	14	0	—	—	—	—	—
1960–61	Springfield Indians	AHL	40	19	27	46	26	—	—	—	—	—
1961–62	Springfield Indians	AHL	69	41	36	77	19	11	0	4	4	2
1962–63	Detroit Red Wings	NHL	51	9	17	26	10	11	2	3	5	4
1962–63	Pittsburgh Hornets	AHL	16	8	7	15	6	—	—	—	—	—
1963–64	Detroit Red Wings	NHL	52	18	13	31	22	14	4	3	7	4
1963–64	Pittsburgh Hornets	AHL	21	14	17	31	14	—	—	—	—	—
1964–65	Detroit Red Wings	NHL	67	16	29	45	44	7	1	3	4	4
1965–66	Detroit Red Wings	NHL	66	21	28	49	20	12	5	2	7	4
1966–67	Detroit Red Wings	NHL	54	11	14	25	8	—	—	—	—	—
1966–67	Pittsburgh Hornets	AHL	13	5	9	14	10	—	—	—	—	—
1967–68	Detroit Red Wings	NHL	57	18	21	39	14	—	—	—	—	—
1967–68	Toronto Maple Leafs	NHL	6	6	1	7	0	4	0	0	0	0
1968–69	Toronto Maple Leafs	NHL	64	15	19	34	22	—	—	—	—	—
1969–70	Toronto Maple Leafs	NHL	61	4	14	18	13	—	—	—	—	—
1970–71	Buffalo Sabres	NHL	77	6	11	17	46	—	—	—	—	—
1971–72	Buffalo Sabres	NHL	6	0	1	1	2	—	—	—	—	—
NHL totals			616	129	178	307	207	48	12	11	23	16
AHL totals			458	190	273	463	258	40	3	21	24	24

== Coaching record ==
Team	Year	Regular season						Post season			
Team	Year	G	W	L	T	Pts	Finish	W	L	Pct.	Result
BUF	1971–72	1	0	1	0	(0)	6th in East	—	—	—	Missed playoffs
BUF	1974–75	80	49	16	15	113	1st in Adams	10	7	.588	Lost in Stanley Cup Final (PHI)
BUF	1975–76	80	46	21	13	105	2nd in Adams	4	5	.444	Lost in quarterfinals (NYI)
BUF	1976–77	80	48	24	8	104	2nd in Adams	2	4	.333	Lost in quarterfinals (NYI)
CIN	1978–79	80	33	41	6	72	6th in WHA	1	2	.333	Lost in quarterfinals (NEW)
TOR	1979–80	68	30	33	5	(75)	(fired)	—	—	—	—
BUF total		241	143	62	36	322	1 division title	16	16	.500	3 playoff appearances
TOR total		68	30	33	5	65		—	—	—	
NHL total		309	173	94	41	387	1 division title	16	16	.500	
WHA total		80	33	41	6	72		1	2	.333	

Preceded by Position created	Buffalo Sabres captain 1970–71	Succeeded by Gerry Meehan
Preceded by Gord Stellick	General manager of the Toronto Maple Leafs; 1989–91	Succeeded by Cliff Fletcher
Preceded by Punch Imlach	Head coach of the Buffalo Sabres; 1971–72	Succeeded by Joe Crozier
Preceded by Joe Crozier	Head coach of the Buffalo Sabres; 1974–77	Succeeded by Marcel Pronovost
Preceded by Jerry Rafter	Head coach of the Cincinnati Stingers; 1978–79	Succeeded by none
Preceded by Roger Neilson	Head coach of the Toronto Maple Leafs; 1979–80	Succeeded by Dick Duff
