= Bill Inglis (ice hockey) =

Canadian ice hockey player

- Born: May 11, 1943 (age 83) Ottawa, Ontario, Canada
- Height: 5 ft 8 in (173 cm)
- Weight: 157 lb (71 kg; 11 st 3 lb)
- Position: Centre
- Shot: Left
- Played for: Los Angeles Kings; Buffalo Sabres
- Playing career: 1963–1978

William John Inglis (born May 11, 1943) is a Canadian former professional ice hockey centre. He played 36 games in the National Hockey League (NHL): 22 games with the Los Angeles Kings and 14 with the Buffalo Sabres between 1967 and 1970. The rest of his career, which lasted from 1963 to 1978, was spent in various minor leagues. He later coached the Sabres for part of the 1978–79 season.

== Career ==
Inglis's professional hockey career outside the NHL was far more extensive, playing for several teams in the American Hockey League, Western Hockey League and Central Professional Hockey League over a 15-year career. He served as the head coach of the Sabres for the final 56 games of the 1978–79 season, as well for the team's first-round playoff loss that season to the Pittsburgh Penguins.

Inglis also served as head coach for the American Hockey League's Rochester Americans, the International Hockey League's Toledo Goaldiggers and Kalamazoo Wings, and the Central Hockey League's Fort Worth Brahmas until 2004.

In his NHL playing career, Inglis recorded one goal and three assists. As the Sabres' head coach, his records were 28–18–10 (regular season) and 1–2 (playoffs).

== Career statistics ==
=== Regular season and playoffs ===
			Regular season					Playoffs
Season	Team	League	GP	G	A	Pts	PIM	GP	G	A	Pts	PIM
1960–61	Pembroke Lumber Kings	OVJHL	18	10	17	27	16	13	24	16	40	8
1960–61	Pembroke Lumber Kings	M-Cup	—	—	—	—	—	4	4	6	10	0
1961–62	Montreal Junior Canadiens	OHA	50	22	28	50	27	6	3	4	7	2
1962–63	Montreal Junior Canadiens	OHA	50	30	39	69	64	10	5	3	8	2
1962–63	Hull-Ottawa Canadiens	EPHL	1	0	1	1	0	—	—	—	—	—
1963–64	Omaha Knights	CPHL	60	20	16	36	19	10	3	3	6	8
1964–65	Omaha Knights	CPHL	70	29	34	63	44	6	3	0	3	10
1965–66	Houston Apollos	CPHL	69	34	36	70	61	—	—	—	—	—
1966–67	Houston Apollos	CPHL	70	33	34	67	50	6	2	4	6	2
1967–68	Springfield Kings	AHL	59	22	24	46	44	4	0	0	0	7
1967–68	Los Angeles Kings	NHL	14	5	3	8	18	—	—	—	—	—
1968–69	Springfield Kings	AHL	57	26	30	56	22	—	—	—	—	—
1968–69	Los Angeles Kings	NHL	10	0	1	1	0	11	1	2	3	4
1969–70	Springfield Kings	AHL	72	31	44	75	25	14	5	4	9	6
1970–71	Salt Lake Golden Eagles	WHL	6	3	0	3	2	—	—	—	—	—
1970–71	Buffalo Sabres	NHL	14	0	1	1	4	—	—	—	—	—
1971–72	Salt Lake Golden Eagles	WHL	71	24	36	60	29	—	—	—	—	—
1972–73	Cincinnati Swords	AHL	75	40	57	97	29	15	8	7	15	12
1973–74	Cincinnati Swords	AHL	76	35	36	71	48	5	2	1	3	4
1974–75	Hershey Bears	AHL	72	27	43	70	42	12	4	6	10	4
1975–76	Springfield Indians	AHL	70	19	48	67	8	—	—	—	—	—
1976–77	Hershey Bears	AHL	75	21	47	68	10	6	0	1	1	0
1977–78	Phoenix Roadrunners	CHL	9	3	4	7	0	—	—	—	—	—
1977–78	Binghamton Dusters	AHL	11	3	3	6	2	—	—	—	—	—
1977–78	New Haven Nighthawks	AHL	20	1	1	2	0	—	—	—	—	—
AHL totals			587	225	333	558	230	56	19	19	38	33
NHL totals			36	1	3	4	4	11	1	2	3	4

== Coaching record ==
Team	Year	Regular season						Playoffs			
Team	Year	G	W	L	T	Pts	Finish	W	L	Win %	Result
Buffalo Sabres	1978–79	56	28	18	10	66	2nd in Adams	1	2	.333	Lost in Preliminary Round (PIT)
BUF total		56	28	18	10	66		1	2	.333	

Preceded by Marcel Pronovost	Head coach of the Buffalo Sabres; 1978–79	Succeeded by Scotty Bowman
