= Jim Schoenfeld =

Canadian ice hockey player and executive

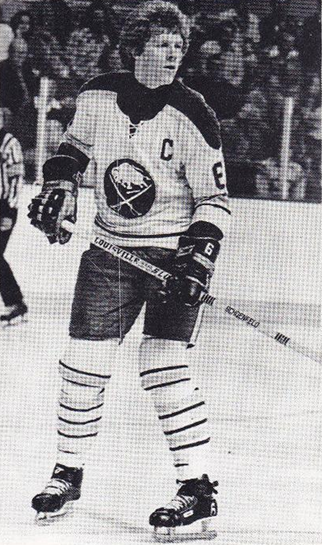
- Schoenfeld with the Buffalo Sabres in 1974
- Born: September 4, 1952 (age 74) Galt, Ontario, Canada
- Height: 6 ft 2 in (188 cm)
- Weight: 206 lb (93 kg; 14 st 10 lb)
- Position: Defence
- Shot: Left
- Played for: Buffalo Sabres; Detroit Red Wings; Boston Bruins
- NHL draft: 5th overall, 1972; Buffalo Sabres
- Playing career: 1972–1985

James Grant Schoenfeld (born September 4, 1952) is a Canadian professional ice hockey executive and former player. He most recently was the assistant general manager with the New York Rangers of the National Hockey League (NHL), as well as an interim assistant coach. He was previously a player and a head coach in the NHL for several teams.

== Biography ==
=== Playing career ===
After a junior career with the London Knights, Hamilton Red Wings, and Niagara Falls Flyers, he was drafted by the Buffalo Sabres and would play eleven seasons with that team, including spending time as the team's captain. He also played for the Detroit Red Wings and Boston Bruins. He retired as an NHL player in 1985.

=== Coaching/general management career ===
Since retirement, he has served as the head coach of several NHL teams, including the Sabres, New Jersey Devils, Washington Capitals, and Phoenix Coyotes. As an NHL head coach, Schoenfeld has compiled a record of 256–246–78 (.509). In 2007, he was promoted from the head coach of the Hartford Wolf Pack of the American Hockey League to assistant general manager of the New York Rangers, the Wolf Pack's NHL affiliate. At the time, he was also assigned to be the general manager of the Wolf Pack until he was relieved of those duties in 2017.

Schoenfeld is remembered for an altercation with NHL referee Don Koharski after game 3 of the 1988 Wales Conference Finals after his New Jersey Devils lost 6–1 to the Boston Bruins. Schoenfeld was waiting for Koharski when he left the ice and immediately began arguing with him in the corridor between the benches and the Devils' dressing room. A camera from WABC-TV recorded the entire exchange, during which Koharski stumbled and fell onto the floor. Although Schoenfeld had not made contact with Koharski, and had been standing in front of him when he fell, Koharski believed otherwise and yelled at him, "You're gone now!", believing that the coach would be suspended for attacking him. Schoenfeld denied touching Koharski, and when the official said that he hoped the exchange was being recorded, yelled back, "Good, 'cause you fell, you fat pig! Have another doughnut! Have another doughnut!" as Koharski and the other officials headed to their dressing room. Schoenfeld was suspended by League disciplinarian Brian O'Neill for the following game, but the Devils sought a court order to overturn the suspension. About 40 minutes before the start of the game, New Jersey Superior Court Judge James F. Madden issued a restraining order allowing Schoenfeld to coach, subsequently triggering a walkout by the scheduled game 4 officials: referee Dave Newell and linesmen Gord Broseker and Ray Scapinello. After more than an hour's delay, three local off-ice officials – Paul McInnis, Jim Sullivan, and Vin Godleski – were tracked down to work the game. The Devils went on to win the game by a score of 3–1, but Schoenfeld was later suspended for game 5, fined $1,000, his team was fined $10,000, and the officials returned to work.

This incident was parodied later in the movie Wayne's World, when a rather large and apathetic police officer named Officer Koharski hung out at the counter of Stan Mikita's Doughnut Shop. The movie used Stan Mikita's as the name of a doughnut shop, as a parody reference to the chain Tim Hortons. Coincidentally, during the final part of his career, Tim Horton himself teamed on defense with a young Jim Schoenfeld with the Buffalo Sabres. Later, Schoenfeld often paired with Jerry Korab.

On July 23, 2007, Schoenfeld was named New York Rangers assistant general manager to Glen Sather, replacing Don Maloney (who had become general manager of the Phoenix Coyotes franchise). Ken Gernander took over the head coach position in Hartford, while Schoenfeld retained his position of general manager for the farm team. On April 26, 2009, while serving as interim assistant coach for the Rangers under head coach John Tortorella, Schoenfeld stepped in to act as head coach for game 6 of the Eastern Conference Quarterfinals against the Washington Capitals following Tortorella's one-game suspension for inappropriate fan contact in game 5 of the series. He stepped down from his positions of senior vice president and assistant general manager on May 16, 2019.

=== Broadcasting career ===
In the fall of 1992, he joined ESPN as color commentator for regular season games with play-by-play man Gary Thorne. However, starting in the 1993 playoffs until his departure on January 28, 1994, he worked as the studio analyst with hockey writer Al Morganti and host John Saunders. He returned to the network again from 2000–2002 in the same roles that he did from 1992–94.

=== Musical career ===
Schoenfeld also recorded two albums during his time in Buffalo, both of which were recorded in collaboration with Buffalo Music Hall of Fame singer and producer John Valby (before Valby's turn toward more ribald material). The first, Schony, was released in 1973 and credited solely to Schoenfeld; the album consisted mostly of cover versions of a broad variety of songs (often radically rearranged from the originals), with two originals: the Valby-penned bluegrass tune "Barbecue in Heaven" and Schoenfeld's own "Before." He recorded a second album in 1974 entitled The Key Is Love; this album, which was credited to both Schoenfeld and Valby, consisted of all original songs.

== Career statistics ==
| | | | Regular season | | | | | Playoffs |
| Season | Team | League | GP | G | A | Pts | PIM | GP | G | A | Pts | PIM |
|---|---|---|---|---|---|---|---|---|---|---|---|---|
| 1969–70 | London Knights | OHA-Jr. | 16 | 1 | 4 | 5 | 81 | — | — | — | — | — |
| 1969–70 | Hamilton Red Wings | OHA-Jr. | 32 | 2 | 12 | 14 | 54 | — | — | — | — | — |
| 1970–71 | Hamilton Red Wings | OHA-Jr. | 25 | 3 | 19 | 22 | 120 | — | — | — | — | — |
| 1970–71 | Niagara Falls Flyers | OHA-Jr. | 30 | 3 | 9 | 12 | 85 | — | — | — | — | — |
| 1971–72 | Niagara Falls Flyers | OHA-Jr. | 40 | 6 | 46 | 52 | 215 | 6 | 0 | 0 | 0 | 32 |
| 1972–73 | Buffalo Sabres | NHL | 66 | 4 | 15 | 19 | 178 | 6 | 2 | 1 | 3 | 4 |
| 1973–74 | Buffalo Sabres | NHL | 28 | 1 | 8 | 9 | 56 | — | — | — | — | — |
| 1973–74 | Cincinnati Swords | AHL | 2 | 0 | 2 | 2 | 4 | — | — | — | — | — |
| 1974–75 | Buffalo Sabres | NHL | 68 | 1 | 19 | 20 | 184 | 17 | 1 | 4 | 5 | 38 |
| 1975–76 | Buffalo Sabres | NHL | 56 | 2 | 22 | 24 | 114 | 8 | 0 | 3 | 3 | 33 |
| 1976–77 | Buffalo Sabres | NHL | 65 | 7 | 25 | 32 | 97 | 6 | 0 | 0 | 0 | 12 |
| 1977–78 | Buffalo Sabres | NHL | 60 | 2 | 20 | 22 | 89 | 8 | 0 | 1 | 1 | 28 |
| 1978–79 | Buffalo Sabres | NHL | 46 | 8 | 17 | 25 | 67 | 3 | 0 | 1 | 1 | 0 |
| 1979–80 | Buffalo Sabres | NHL | 77 | 9 | 27 | 36 | 72 | 14 | 0 | 3 | 3 | 18 |
| 1980–81 | Buffalo Sabres | NHL | 71 | 8 | 25 | 33 | 110 | 8 | 0 | 0 | 0 | 14 |
| 1981–82 | Buffalo Sabres | NHL | 13 | 3 | 2 | 5 | 30 | — | — | — | — | — |
| 1981–82 | Detroit Red Wings | NHL | 39 | 5 | 9 | 14 | 69 | — | — | — | — | — |
| 1982–83 | Detroit Red Wings | NHL | 57 | 1 | 10 | 11 | 18 | — | — | — | — | — |
| 1983–84 | Boston Bruins | NHL | 39 | 0 | 2 | 2 | 20 | — | — | — | — | — |
| 1984–85 | Buffalo Sabres | NHL | 34 | 0 | 3 | 3 | 28 | 5 | 0 | 0 | 0 | 4 |
| NHL totals | | | 719 | 51 | 204 | 255 | 1,132 | 75 | 3 | 13 | 16 | 151 |

== Coaching record ==
| Team | Year | Regular season | | | | | | Postseason |
| Team | Year | G | W | L | T | Pts | Division rank | Result |
|---|---|---|---|---|---|---|---|---|
| BUF | 1985–86 | 43 | 19 | 19 | 5 | (43) | (fired) | — |
| NJD | 1987–88 | 30 | 17 | 12 | 1 | (35) | 4th in Patrick | Lost in Conference Finals (BOS) |
| NJD | 1988–89 | 80 | 27 | 41 | 12 | 66 | 5th in Patrick | Missed playoffs |
| NJD | 1989–90 | 14 | 6 | 6 | 2 | (14) | (fired) | — |
| WSH | 1993–94 | 37 | 19 | 12 | 6 | (44) | 3rd in Atlantic | Lost in Conference Semifinals (NYR) |
| WSH | 1994–95 | 48 | 22 | 18 | 8 | 52 | 3rd in Atlantic | Lost in Conference Quarterfinals (PIT) |
| WSH | 1995–96 | 82 | 39 | 32 | 11 | 89 | 4th in Atlantic | Lost in Conference Quarterfinals (PIT) |
| WSH | 1996–97 | 82 | 33 | 40 | 9 | 75 | 5th in Atlantic | Missed playoffs |
| PHX | 1997–98 | 82 | 35 | 35 | 12 | 82 | 4th in Central | Lost in Conference Quarterfinals (DET) |
| PHX | 1998–99 | 82 | 39 | 31 | 12 | 90 | 2nd in Pacific | Lost in Conference Quarterfinals (STL) |
| Total | | 580 | 256 | 246 | 78 | | | 6 playoff appearances |

| Preceded by Rick Martin | Buffalo Sabres first-round draft pick 1972 | Succeeded by Morris Titanic |
| Preceded by Gerry Meehan | Buffalo Sabres captain 1974–1977 | Succeeded by Danny Gare |
| Preceded by Scotty Bowman | Head coach of the Buffalo Sabres; 1985–1986 | Succeeded by Scotty Bowman |
| Preceded by Doug Carpenter | Head coach of the New Jersey Devils; 1987–1990 | Succeeded by John Cunniff |
| Preceded by Terry Murray | Head coach of the Washington Capitals; 1994–1997 | Succeeded by Ron Wilson |
| Preceded by Don Hay | Head coach of the Phoenix Coyotes; 1997–1999 | Succeeded by Bob Francis |
