= 2006–07 NHL season =

National Hockey League season

- League: National Hockey League
- Sport: Ice hockey
- Duration: October 4, 2006 – June 6, 2007
- Games: 82
- Teams: 30
- TV partner(s): CBC, TSN, RDS (Canada); Versus, NBC (United States)

Draft
- Top draft pick: Erik Johnson
- Picked by: St. Louis Blues

Regular season
- Presidents' Trophy: Buffalo Sabres
- Season MVP: Sidney Crosby (Penguins)
- Top scorer: Sidney Crosby (Penguins)

Playoffs
- Playoffs MVP: Scott Niedermayer (Ducks)

Stanley Cup
- Champions: Anaheim Ducks
- Runners-up: Ottawa Senators

NHL seasons
- 2005–06 2007–08

The 2006–07 NHL season was the 90th season of operation (89th season of play) of the National Hockey League (NHL). The Mighty Ducks of Anaheim officially shortened their name to the Anaheim Ducks prior to the season. The 2007 Stanley Cup playoffs began on April 11, 2007, and concluded on June 6, with the Ducks defeating the Ottawa Senators to win their first Stanley Cup, becoming the first team from California to do so.

== League business ==
=== Salary cap ===
The NHL announced that the regular season salary cap rise after the initial season. The 2006–07 salary cap was increased by US$5,000,000 per team to bring the salary cap up to US$44,000,000. While the 2006–07 salary floor was increased by US$8,000,000 per team to US$28,000,000. This is the only year where the NHL salary floor raised faster than the NHL salary cap.

=== Anaheim rebranding ===
The Mighty Ducks of Anaheim officially shortened their name to the Anaheim Ducks prior to the season, introducing a new logo, uniforms and color scheme. This reflected a clean break from their original owners, The Walt Disney Company, who originally named the team after the movie, The Mighty Ducks upon their formation in 1993.

=== Jersey number 84 ===
No NHL player had worn the jersey number 84 until Guillaume Latendresse of the Montreal Canadiens began doing so at the start of this season.

=== Entry draft ===
The 2006 NHL entry draft was held at General Motors Place in Vancouver, British Columbia, on June 24, 2006. Erik Johnson was selected first overall by the St. Louis Blues.

NHL referee helmet requirement

All NHL officials were required to wear helmets at the beginning of the season, even for those that were covered under the Grandfather clause that was introduced in the 1988-89 season. Mick McGeough would be the last NHL official to referee a game without a helmet during the 2006 Stanley Cup Final

== Arena changes ==
- The renamed Anaheim Ducks' home arena, the Arrowhead Pond of Anaheim, was renamed the Honda Center as part of a new naming rights deal with Honda.
- The Nashville Predators' home arena, Gaylord Entertainment Center, was officially reverted to its original name, Nashville Arena. Gaylord Entertainment Company's involvement with the team ended in February 2005, but the Predators did not start referring to the building's original until this season. However, the actual "Gaylord Entertainment Center" signage on arena's exterior was not removed until March 2007.
- The Phoenix Coyotes' home arena, Glendale Arena, was renamed Jobing.com Arena after the Phoenix-based employment website Jobing.com signed a new naming rights agreement.
- The St. Louis Blues's home arena, the Savvis Center, was renamed the Scottrade Center as part of a new naming rights agreement with Scottrade.
- The Washington Capitals' home arena, the MCI Center, was renamed the Verizon Center, reflecting Verizon's acquisition of MCI.

== Regular season ==
=== All-Star Game ===
The NHL All-Star Game returned after a two-year absence when the Dallas Stars hosted the 55th National Hockey League All-Star Game at the American Airlines Center on January 24, 2007. Dallas hosted the All-Star Game for the first time, and it was the first time the Stars franchise had hosted the game since 1972, when it was hosted by the-then Minnesota North Stars. The West defeated the East by a score of 12–9, with Danny Briere of the Buffalo Sabres being named MVP of the game. Fewer penalties were called than in 2005–06 (an average of 398 per team). This led to fewer goals scored overall (7,082) and more shutouts (150). However, more even-strength goals were scored (4,715) than in 2005–06 (4,579).

=== Highlights ===
This season would have an intense battle between Martin Brodeur and Roberto Luongo for the Vezina Trophy and a piece of NHL history. Both goaltenders were vying to break Bernie Parent's NHL record 47 wins in a single season. On April 3, 2007, Brodeur tied the NHL record for most wins in a single season with 47, set by Parent in 1973–74, in a 2–1 shootout victory against the Ottawa Senators. Two days later, he broke the thirty-three-year-old record with his 48th win in a 3–2 victory over the Philadelphia Flyers, which helped the Devils clinch their seventh Atlantic Division title and the second seed in the Eastern Conference. Luongo finished with a career-high 47 wins, one shy of Brodeur, and consequently finished runner-up in a close race for the Vezina. Luongo and Brodeur are considered, however, to have been given an advantage to Parent with the inauguration of the shootout that season by the NHL, allowing more games to be decided with wins, as opposed to ties.

The Carolina Hurricanes became the first team since the 1995–96 New Jersey Devils to miss the playoffs after winning the Stanley Cup the previous season. The Edmonton Oilers, the runners up in the Cup Final, also missed the playoffs, marking the first time in NHL history that both Stanley Cup finalists missed the playoffs the following season.

The inter-conference division play had the Northeast visit the Central, the Central visit the Atlantic, the Atlantic visit the Pacific, the Pacific visit the Southeast, the Southeast visit the Northwest, and the Northwest visits the Northeast.

== Standings ==
Buffalo Sabres won the Presidents' Trophy and home-ice advantage throughout the playoffs.

For the purpose of conference rankings, division leaders are automatically ranked 1–3. These three, plus the next five teams in the conference standings, earn playoff berths at the end of the season.

=== Eastern Conference ===
Atlantic Division
No.	CR		GP	W	L	OTL	GF	GA	Pts
1	2	**New Jersey Devils**	82	49	24	9	216	201	107
2	5	**Pittsburgh Penguins**	82	47	24	11	277	246	105
3	6	**New York Rangers**	82	42	30	10	242	216	94
4	8	**New York Islanders**	82	40	30	12	248	240	92
5	15	Philadelphia Flyers	82	22	48	12	214	303	56

Northeast Division
No.	CR		GP	W	L	OTL	GF	GA	Pts
1	1	**Buffalo Sabres**	82	53	22	7	308	242	113
2	4	**Ottawa Senators**	82	48	25	9	288	222	105
3	9	Toronto Maple Leafs	82	40	31	11	258	269	91
4	10	Montreal Canadiens	82	42	34	6	245	256	90
5	13	Boston Bruins	82	35	41	6	219	289	76

Southeast Division
No.	CR		GP	W	L	OTL	GF	GA	Pts
1	3	**Atlanta Thrashers**	82	43	28	11	246	245	97
2	7	**Tampa Bay Lightning**	82	44	33	5	253	261	93
3	11	Carolina Hurricanes	82	40	34	8	241	253	88
4	12	Florida Panthers	82	35	31	16	247	257	86
5	14	Washington Capitals	82	28	40	14	235	286	70

Eastern Conference
R		Div	GP	W	L	OTL	GF	GA	Pts
**1**	**P -** Buffalo Sabres	**NE**	**82**	**53**	**22**	**7**	**308**	**242**	113
**2**	**Y -** New Jersey Devils	**AT**	**82**	**49**	**24**	**9**	**216**	**201**	107
**3**	**Y -** Atlanta Thrashers	**SE**	**82**	**43**	**28**	**11**	**246**	**245**	97
**4**	**X -** Ottawa Senators	**NE**	**82**	**48**	**25**	**9**	**288**	**222**	105
**5**	**X -** Pittsburgh Penguins	**AT**	**82**	**47**	**24**	**11**	**277**	**246**	105
**6**	**X -** New York Rangers	**AT**	**82**	**42**	**30**	**10**	**242**	**216**	94
**7**	**X -** Tampa Bay Lightning	**SE**	**82**	**44**	**33**	**5**	**253**	**261**	93
**8**	**X -** New York Islanders	**AT**	**82**	**40**	**30**	**12**	**248**	**240**	92
8.5
9	Toronto Maple Leafs	NE	82	40	31	11	258	269	91
10	Montreal Canadiens	NE	82	42	34	6	245	256	90
11	Carolina Hurricanes	SE	82	40	34	8	241	253	88
12	Florida Panthers	SE	82	35	31	16	247	257	86
13	Boston Bruins	NE	82	35	41	6	219	289	76
14	Washington Capitals	SE	82	28	40	14	235	286	70
15	Philadelphia Flyers	AT	82	22	48	12	214	303	56

Divisions: AT – Atlantic, NE – Northeast, SE – Southeast

P – Clinched Presidents Trophy; Y – Clinched division; X – Clinched playoff spot

=== Western Conference ===
Central Division
No.	CR		GP	W	L	OTL	GF	GA	Pts
1	1	**Detroit Red Wings**	82	50	19	13	254	199	113
2	4	**Nashville Predators**	82	51	23	8	272	212	110
3	10	St. Louis Blues	82	34	35	13	214	254	81
4	11	Columbus Blue Jackets	82	33	42	7	201	249	73
5	13	Chicago Blackhawks	82	31	42	9	201	258	71

Northwest Division
No.	CR		GP	W	L	OTL	GF	GA	Pts
1	3	**Vancouver Canucks**	82	49	26	7	222	201	105
2	7	**Minnesota Wild**	82	48	26	8	235	191	104
3	8	**Calgary Flames**	82	43	29	10	258	226	96
4	9	Colorado Avalanche	82	44	31	7	272	251	95
5	12	Edmonton Oilers	82	32	43	7	195	248	71

Pacific Division
No.	CR		GP	W	L	OTL	GF	GA	Pts
1	2	**Anaheim Ducks**	82	48	20	14	258	208	110
2	5	**San Jose Sharks**	82	51	26	5	258	199	107
3	6	**Dallas Stars**	82	50	25	7	226	197	107
4	14	Los Angeles Kings	82	27	41	14	227	283	68
5	15	Phoenix Coyotes	82	31	46	5	216	284	67

Note: CR = Conference rank; GP = Games played; W = Wins; L = Losses; T = Ties; OTL = Overtime/shootout loss; GF = Goals for; GA = Goals against; PIM = Penalties in minutes; Pts = Points
Bolded teams qualified for the playoffs.

Western Conference
R		Div	GP	W	L	OTL	GF	GA	Pts
**1**	**z-Detroit Red Wings**	**CE**	**82**	**50**	**19**	**13**	**254**	**199**	**113**
**2**	**y-Anaheim Ducks**	**PA**	**82**	**48**	**20**	**14**	**258**	**208**	**110**
**3**	**y-Vancouver Canucks**	**NW**	**82**	**49**	**26**	**7**	**222**	**201**	**105**
**4**	**Nashville Predators**	**CE**	**82**	**51**	**23**	**8**	**272**	**212**	**110**
**5**	**San Jose Sharks**	**PA**	**82**	**51**	**26**	**5**	**258**	**199**	**107**
**6**	**Dallas Stars**	**PA**	**82**	**50**	**25**	**7**	**226**	**197**	**107**
**7**	**Minnesota Wild**	**NW**	**82**	**48**	**26**	**8**	**235**	**191**	**104**
**8**	**Calgary Flames**	**NW**	**82**	**43**	**29**	**10**	**258**	**226**	**96**
8.5
9	Colorado Avalanche	NW	82	44	31	7	272	251	95
10	St. Louis Blues	CE	82	34	35	13	214	254	81
11	Columbus Blue Jackets	CE	82	33	42	7	201	249	73
12	Edmonton Oilers	NW	82	32	43	7	195	248	71
13	Chicago Blackhawks	CE	82	31	42	9	201	258	71
14	Los Angeles Kings	PA	82	27	41	14	227	283	68
15	Phoenix Coyotes	PA	82	31	46	5	216	284	67

bold - qualified for playoffs, y - division title, z - best conference record
CE - Central Division, NW - Northwest Division, PA - Pacific Division

=== Tiebreaking procedures ===
If two or more clubs are tied in points during the regular season, the standing of the clubs is determined in the following order:

1. The fewer number of games played (i.e., superior points percentage).
2. The greater number of games won.
3. The greater number of points earned in games between the tied clubs.
4. The greater differential between goals for and against.

== Playoffs ==
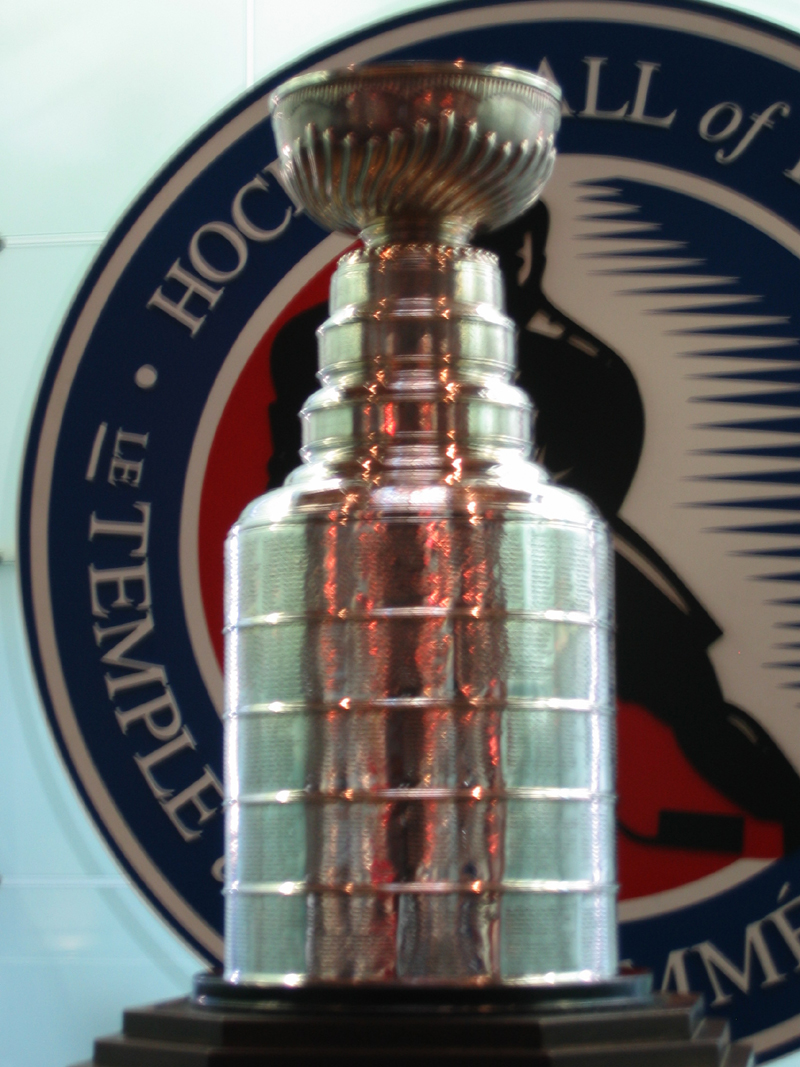
The Stanley Cup

=== Bracket ===
In each round, teams competed in a best-of-seven series following a 2–2–1–1–1 format (scores in the bracket indicate the number of games won in each best-of-seven series). The team with home ice advantage played at home for games one and two (and games five and seven, if necessary), and the other team played at home for games three and four (and game six, if necessary). The top eight teams in each conference made the playoffs, with the three division winners seeded 1–3 based on regular season record, and the five remaining teams seeded 4–8.

The NHL used "re-seeding" instead of a fixed bracket playoff system. During the first three rounds, the highest remaining seed in each conference was matched against the lowest remaining seed, the second-highest remaining seed played the second-lowest remaining seed, and so forth. The higher-seeded team was awarded home ice advantage. The two conference winners then advanced to the Stanley Cup Final, where home ice advantage was awarded to the team that had the better regular season record.

Conference quarterfinals	Conference semifinals
1	Buffalo	4
8	NY Islanders	1
1	Buffalo	4
6	NY Rangers	2
2	New Jersey	4
7	Tampa Bay	2
Eastern Conference
3	Atlanta	0
6	NY Rangers	4
2	New Jersey	1
4	Ottawa	4
4	Ottawa	4
5	Pittsburgh	1
1	Detroit	4
8	Calgary	2
1	Detroit	4
5	San Jose	2
2	Anaheim	4
7	Minnesota	1
Western Conference
3	Vancouver	4
6	Dallas	3
2	Anaheim	4
3	Vancouver	1
4	Nashville	1
5	San Jose	4

Conference finals
1	Buffalo	1
4	Ottawa	4
1	Detroit	2
2	Anaheim	4

Stanley Cup Final
E4	Ottawa	1
W2	Anaheim	4

== Awards ==
Award	Recipient(s)	Runner(s)-up/finalists
Presidents' Trophy:	Buffalo Sabres	Detroit Red Wings
Prince of Wales Trophy: (Eastern Conference playoff champion)	Ottawa Senators	Buffalo Sabres
Clarence S. Campbell Bowl: (Western Conference playoff champion)	Anaheim Ducks	Detroit Red Wings
Art Ross Trophy:	Sidney Crosby, Pittsburgh Penguins	Joe Thornton (San Jose Sharks)
Bill Masterton Memorial Trophy:	Phil Kessel, Boston Bruins	Chris Chelios (Detroit Red Wings); Saku Koivu (Montreal Canadiens)
Calder Memorial Trophy:	Evgeni Malkin, Pittsburgh Penguins	Jordan Staal (Pittsburgh Penguins); Paul Stastny (Colorado Avalanche)
Conn Smythe Trophy:	Scott Niedermayer, Anaheim Ducks	N/A
Frank J. Selke Trophy:	Rod Brind'Amour, Carolina Hurricanes	Samuel Pahlsson (Anaheim Ducks); Jay Pandolfo (New Jersey Devils)
Hart Memorial Trophy:	Sidney Crosby, Pittsburgh Penguins	Roberto Luongo (Vancouver Canucks); Martin Brodeur (New Jersey Devils)
Jack Adams Award:	Alain Vigneault, Vancouver Canucks	Lindy Ruff (Buffalo Sabres); Michel Therrien (Pittsburgh Penguins)
James Norris Memorial Trophy:	Nicklas Lidstrom, Detroit Red Wings	Chris Pronger (Anaheim Ducks); Scott Niedermayer (Anaheim Ducks)
King Clancy Memorial Trophy:	Saku Koivu, Montreal Canadiens	Jarome Iginla (Calgary Flames); Olaf Kolzig (Washington Capitals)
Lady Byng Memorial Trophy:	Pavel Datsyuk, Detroit Red Wings	Joe Sakic (Colorado Avalanche); Martin St. Louis (Tampa Bay Lightning)
Lester B. Pearson Award:	Sidney Crosby, Pittsburgh Penguins	Vincent Lecavalier (Tampa Bay Lightning); Roberto Luongo (Vancouver Canucks)
Maurice "Rocket" Richard Trophy:	Vincent Lecavalier, Tampa Bay Lightning	Dany Heatley (Ottawa Senators)
NHL Foundation Player Award:	Joe Sakic, Colorado Avalanche	N/A
NHL Plus-Minus Award:	Thomas Vanek, Buffalo Sabres	N/A
Roger Crozier Saving Grace Award:	Niklas Backstrom, Minnesota Wild	N/A
Vezina Trophy:	Martin Brodeur, New Jersey Devils	Roberto Luongo (Vancouver Canucks); Henrik Lundqvist (New York Rangers)
William M. Jennings Trophy:	Niklas Backstrom and Manny Fernandez, Minnesota Wild	N/A

=== All-Star teams ===
First Team	Position	Second Team
Martin Brodeur, New Jersey Devils	G	Roberto Luongo, Vancouver Canucks
Nicklas Lidstrom, Detroit Red Wings	D	Dan Boyle, Tampa Bay Lightning
Scott Niedermayer, Anaheim Ducks	D	Chris Pronger, Anaheim Ducks
Sidney Crosby, Pittsburgh Penguins	C	Vincent Lecavalier, Tampa Bay Lightning
Dany Heatley, Ottawa Senators	RW	Martin St. Louis, Tampa Bay Lightning
Alexander Ovechkin, Washington Capitals	LW	Thomas Vanek, Buffalo Sabres

== Player statistics ==
=== Scoring leaders ===
Note: GP = Games played; G = Goals; A = Assists; Pts = Points; +/– = Plus/minus; PIM = Penalty minutes

Player	Team	GP	G	A	Pts	+/–	PIM
Sidney Crosby	Pittsburgh Penguins	79	36	84	120	+10	60
Joe Thornton	San Jose Sharks	82	22	92	114	+24	44
Vincent Lecavalier	Tampa Bay Lightning	82	52	56	108	+2	44
Dany Heatley	Ottawa Senators	82	50	55	105	+31	74
Martin St. Louis	Tampa Bay Lightning	82	43	59	102	+7	28
Marian Hossa	Atlanta Thrashers	82	43	57	100	+18	49
Joe Sakic	Colorado Avalanche	82	36	64	100	+2	46
Jaromir Jagr	New York Rangers	82	30	66	96	+26	78
Marc Savard	Boston Bruins	82	22	74	96	−19	96
Daniel Briere	Buffalo Sabres	81	32	63	95	+17	89
Teemu Selanne	Anaheim Ducks	82	48	46	94	+26	82

Source: NHL.

=== Leading goaltenders ===
Note: GP = Games played; Min = Minutes played; W = Wins; L = Losses; OTL = Overtime/shootout losses; GA = Goals against; SO = Shutouts; Sv% = Save percentage; GAA = Goals against average

Player	Team	GP	Min	W	L	OTL	GA	SO	Sv%	GAA
Niklas Backstrom	Minnesota Wild	41	2,226	23	8	6	73	5	.929	1.97
Dominik Hasek	Detroit Red Wings	56	3,340	38	11	6	114	8	.913	2.05
Martin Brodeur	New Jersey Devils	78	4,696	48	23	7	171	12	.922	2.18
Marty Turco	Dallas Stars	67	3,763	38	20	5	140	6	.910	2.23
Jean-Sebastien Giguere	Anaheim Ducks	56	3,244	36	10	8	122	4	.918	2.26
Roberto Luongo	Vancouver Canucks	76	4,490	47	22	6	171	5	.921	2.28
Evgeni Nabokov	San Jose Sharks	50	2,777	25	16	4	106	7	.914	2.29
Henrik Lundqvist	New York Rangers	70	4,108	37	22	8	160	5	.917	2.34
Vesa Toskala	San Jose Sharks	38	2,141	26	10	1	84	4	.908	2.35
Chris Mason	Nashville Predators	40	2,341	38	24	11	93	5	.25	2.38

== Coaches ==
=== Eastern Conference ===
- Atlanta Thrashers: Bob Hartley
- Boston Bruins: Dave Lewis
- Buffalo Sabres: Lindy Ruff
- Carolina Hurricanes: Peter Laviolette
- Florida Panthers: Jacques Martin
- Montreal Canadiens: Guy Carbonneau
- New Jersey Devils: Claude Julien and Lou Lamoriello
- New York Islanders: Ted Nolan
- New York Rangers: Tom Renney
- Ottawa Senators: Bryan Murray
- Philadelphia Flyers: Ken Hitchcock and John Stevens
- Pittsburgh Penguins: Michel Therrien
- Tampa Bay Lightning: John Tortorella
- Toronto Maple Leafs: Paul Maurice
- Washington Capitals: Glen Hanlon

=== Western Conference ===
- Anaheim Ducks: Randy Carlyle
- Calgary Flames: Jim Playfair
- Chicago Blackhawks: Trent Yawney and Denis Savard
- Colorado Avalanche: Joel Quenneville
- Columbus Blue Jackets: Gerard Gallant, Gary Agnew, and Ken Hitchcock
- Dallas Stars: Dave Tippett
- Detroit Red Wings: Mike Babcock
- Edmonton Oilers: Craig MacTavish
- Los Angeles Kings: Marc Crawford
- Minnesota Wild: Jacques Lemaire
- Nashville Predators: Barry Trotz
- Phoenix Coyotes: Wayne Gretzky
- San Jose Sharks: Ron Wilson
- St. Louis Blues: Mike Kitchen and Andy Murray
- Vancouver Canucks: Alain Vigneault

== Events and milestones ==
Several former players had their jersey numbers retired during this season:

- Pittsburgh Penguins retired Mario Lemieux's No. 66 for the second time on October 5.
- St. Louis Blues retired Brett Hull's No. 16 on December 5.
- Detroit Red Wings retired Steve Yzerman's No. 19 on January 2.
- Los Angeles Kings retired Luc Robitaille's No. 20 on January 20.
- Montreal Canadiens retired Serge Savard's No. 18 on November 18 and Ken Dryden's No. 29 on January 29.
- Calgary Flames retired Mike Vernon's No. 30 on February 6.
- Edmonton Oilers retired Mark Messier's No. 11 on February 27.

Numerous players reached major milestones during the season:

- Brendan Shanahan became the 15th player with 600 regular season NHL goals when he scored twice in his debut with the New York Rangers on October 5.
- Jaromir Jagr joined Shanahan in the 600 goal club on November 19, making Jagr and Shanahan the first teammates to reach 600 goals in the same season. Jagr also passed Jari Kurri's record for points by a European-born player and later became the 12th player to score 1,500 career points. Jagr scored his 30th goal of the season against the Montreal Canadiens on April 5, tying Mike Gartner's record for most consecutive 30-goal seasons at 15.
- Joe Sakic became the third player to score 600 career goals this season on February 15. Sakic also became the 11th player to record 1,500 points.
- Teppo Numminen played in his 1,252nd regular season game on November 13, passing Jari Kurri's record for most games played by a European-trained player.
- Mats Sundin became the first Swedish player to score 500 career goals on October 14.
- Teemu Selanne scored his 500th goal on November 23, becoming only the second Finnish player to reach the mark.
- Peter Bondra became the 37th player to achieve 500 goals on December 22, followed shortly thereafter by Mark Recchi as number 38 on January 26.
- On March 13, Mike Modano became the 39th player to score 500 goals. Four nights later, he passed Joe Mullen for most goals by an American-born player by scoring his 503rd goal.

The NHL's youth movement continued:

- Evgeni Malkin of the Pittsburgh Penguins became first player in 89 years to score a goal in each of his first six games in the NHL.
- Pittsburgh Penguins forward Jordan Staal became the youngest player (18 years, 153 days) in NHL history to record a hat trick on February 10.
- Colorado Avalanche forward Paul Stastny set an NHL rookie record by scoring at least one point in 20 consecutive games, breaking Teemu Selänne's record of 17.
- Nineteen-year-old phenom Sidney Crosby claimed the scoring title with 120 points, becoming the youngest player in NHL history to achieve the feat.
- Crosby scored a goal against the Carolina Hurricanes to pass Wayne Gretzky as the youngest player (19 years, 207 days) in NHL history to reach 200 career points.

Numerous other milestones, events, and happenings occurred as well:

- The New York Rangers and Florida Panthers played a historic preseason game on September 23, 2006, when the Rangers defeated the Panthers 3–2 in the NHL's first game in Puerto Rico.
- On November 9, 2006, the Anaheim Ducks set an NHL open era record by remaining undefeated in regulation for the first 16 games of the season, with 12 wins and four overtime losses. The previous mark was set by the 1984–85 Edmonton Oilers, who had 12 wins and three ties.
- On January 2, 2007, the Edmonton Oilers recorded their 1,000th regular season win in franchise history by defeating the Florida Panthers 4–1 at Rexall Place in Edmonton, Alberta.
- On February 1, 2007, Martin Brodeur passed Patrick Roy for first place on the all-time overtime wins list, with 45 career overtime wins.
- On February 22, 2007, eight games went to overtime, setting a record for most on one day. Four of these games went to a shootout. One of the shootouts, between the Ottawa Senators and Buffalo Sabres, was the culmination of a game that saw a huge fight, the result of a late hit on Sabres co-captain Chris Drury, that resulted in 100 penalty minutes and three game misconduct ejections.
- On March 11, 2007, Chris Simon of the New York Islanders was suspended an NHL-record 25 games (minimum) for striking New York Rangers center Ryan Hollweg in the face with his stick during a March 8 game between the two teams. Simon missed the Islanders' final 15 regular-season contests, their five post-season games, and the first five games of the 2007–08 season.
- On March 31, 2007, Vincent Lecavalier of the Tampa Bay Lightning scored his 51st goal of the season against the Washington Capitals, which would be enough to ensure that he became the first Lightning player to win the Maurice "Rocket" Richard Trophy (most goals scored). Lecavalier finished the season with 52 goals. On the same night, Martin St. Louis crossed the 100-point mark for the season, making him and Lecavalier the only teammates in the 2006–07 season to reach 100 points.
- On April 3, 2007, Dominik Hasek of the Detroit Red Wings made 35 saves and moved into a tie for eighth place with Ed Belfour and Tony Esposito on the career shutouts list with 76, in a 3–0 win over the Columbus Blue Jackets. The shutout was Columbus' 16th of the season, setting a modern-day NHL record for shutouts against.
- On April 5, 2007, goalie Martin Brodeur of the New Jersey Devils recorded his 48th win of the season, setting a new record for most wins in a single season by a goaltender. The previous record of 47 wins was set during the 1973–74 NHL season by Bernie Parent of the Philadelphia Flyers.
- For the first time in NHL history, neither of the previous season's Stanley Cup finalists qualified for the playoffs, as both the Edmonton Oilers and defending champion Carolina Hurricanes failed to qualify. The Hurricanes are also the first Stanley Cup Champion since the 1995–96 New Jersey Devils to miss the playoffs the season after their victory.
- The Colorado Avalanche, with 95 points, broke the record set by the Montreal Canadiens in the 1969–70 season who had 92 points, for having the most points of any team missing the playoffs.
- The Vancouver Canucks broke their franchise record of the longest playoff game on April 11, 2007, winning near the end of the fourth overtime, against the Dallas Stars and marking the sixth-longest game in NHL history.
- On June 2, 2007, the Stanley Cup Final returned to Ottawa for the first time in over 80 years, since the final match between the original Ottawa Senators and the Boston Bruins on April 13, 1927, was played. As reported by The Canadian Press, 99-year-old Russell Williams was in attendance, who attended the 1927 Stanley Cup Final game. The Senators won the game, 5–3.

=== Debuts ===
The following is a list of players of note who played their first NHL game in 2006–07:

- Loui Eriksson, Dallas Stars
- Jack Johnson, Los Angeles Kings
- Anze Kopitar, Los Angeles Kings
- Evgeni Malkin, Pittsburgh Penguins
- Jordan Staal, Pittsburgh Penguins
- Kris Letang, Pittsburgh Penguins
- Rich Peverley, Nashville Predators
- David Krejci, Boston Bruins
- Drew Stafford, Buffalo Sabres
- Joe Pavelski, San Jose Sharks
- Ryan Callahan, New York Rangers
- Keith Yandle, Phoenix Coyotes
- Alexander Radulov, Nashville Predators

=== Last games ===
The following is a list of players of note who played their last NHL game in 2006–07, listed with their team:

- Tony Amonte, Calgary Flames
- Ed Belfour, Florida Panthers
- Peter Bondra, Chicago Blackhawks
- Sean Burke, Los Angeles Kings
- Mike Dunham, New York Islanders
- Robert Esche, Philadelphia Flyers
- Darius Kasparaitis, New York Rangers
- John LeClair, Pittsburgh Penguins
- Eric Lindros, Dallas Stars
- Scott Mellanby, Atlanta Thrashers
- Joe Nieuwendyk, Florida Panthers
- Mike Ricci, Phoenix Coyotes
- Pierre Turgeon, Colorado Avalanche

== Broadcasting rights ==
In Canada, national rights were split between CBC and TSN. CBC aired Saturday night Hockey Night in Canada regular season games, while TSN's coverage included Wednesday Night Hockey and other selected weeknights. During the first three rounds of the Stanley Cup playoffs, TSN televised all-U.S. games while CBC aired all games involving Canadian teams. CBC then had exclusive coverage of the Stanley Cup Final.

This was the second season of the league's U.S. national broadcast rights deals with NBC and the renamed Versus (the former Outdoor Life Network (OLN) had shifted beyond simply "outdoor" programming). Versus aired regular season games generally on Monday and Tuesday nights, while NBC had regular season windows on selected weekends. During the playoffs, NBC had the rights to air selected weekend games during the first three postseason rounds of the Stanley Cup playoffs, and games 3–7 of the Stanley Cup Final, while Versus televised selected first and second round playoff games, all conference Final games not aired on NBC, and the first two games of the Stanley Cup Final.

== See also ==
- 2006 NHL entry draft
- 2006-07 NHL transactions
- 2007 Stanley Cup playoffs
- 55th National Hockey League All-Star Game
- National Hockey League All-Star Game
- 2006 in ice hockey
- 2007 in ice hockey
