= FTJ =

FTJ or FTj may refer to:

== People ==
- Nickname for Fabakary Tombong Jatta (born 1952), Gambian politician

== Other ==
- Ferroelectric tunnel junction, type of barrier between electrically conducting materials
- FTJ, abbreviation for Fazil-e-Tibb-o-Jarahat, Pakistani diploma program in Unani medicine
- 1.4L FTJ, engine used in Formula 4 cars
- FTJ FundChoice, asset management platform acquired by Orion Advisor Solutions
- Festival théâtre-jeunesse, youth theatre festival produced by Le Cercle Molière
- FTj, facility prefix equipment attribute in the GPSS programming language
- FTJ, initialism for Federación de Trabajadores de Jalisco, Mexican political party led by Rafael Yerena Zambrano
- FTJ, initialism for Fonds pour une transition juste (Just Transition Fund), organization funded by Next Generation EU
