= Orion Advisor Solutions =

American financial technology company

Orion Advisor Solutions, Inc.
- Company type: Private
- Industry: Financial Technology
- Founded: 1999; 27 years ago, in Omaha, Nebraska, as Orion Advisor Technology
- Founder: Eric Clarke
- Headquarters: Omaha, Nebraska, United States
- Area served: United States
- Key people: Natalie Wolfsen (CEO)
- Products: Software Products, investment Services
- Number of employees: 1,200 (November 2025)
- Website: orion.com

Orion Advisor Solutions is an American financial technology and investment services company headquartered in Omaha, Nebraska. Founded in 1999, it offers portfolio management software and investment solutions for financial advisors, broker-dealers, and other financial institutions.

It develops financial technology software and provides investment solutions for independent financial advisors, broker-dealers, enterprise firms, and other financial institutions. Its brand entities include Orion Advisor Technology, Orion Portfolio Solutions, Brinker Capital Investments, Redtail Technology, and Orion OCIO.

In addition to its headquarters the company has offices in Berwyn, Pennsylvania; Jacksonville, Florida; Hebron, Kentucky; Chandler, Arizona; Lehi, Utah; Idaho Falls, Idaho; and Sacramento, California.

As of June 2025, Orion reported more than $5 trillion in assets under administration (AUA). The company's services are used by thousands of independent advisory firms. Orion is majority-owned by the private equity firms Genstar Capital and TA Associates and employs more than 1,200 employees.

== History ==
Orion was established in 1999 to provide portfolio accounting technology for CLS Investments, an affiliated registered investment adviser. In the following years, the company added technology features, including integration with Salesforce CRM in 2010, branded client web portals in 2012, and a mobile application for advisory firms in 2013. In 2015, it introduced an open API to facilitate connections with custodians and partners; that same year, TA Associates acquired a majority stake in the firm.

In early 2017, Orion introduced Eclipse Trading, a rebalancing tool that supported household-level portfolio management and asset location optimization, along with a compliance toolkit to assist with audit preparation. In late 2017, it launched Communities, a marketplace offering access to strategist model portfolios.

In 2020, Genstar Capital joined TA Associates as a private equity owner of Orion and led the merger of Orion and Brinker Capital, creating a combined company offering technology and turnkey asset management program (TAMP) services.

Eric Clarke, the company’s founder and Chief Executive Officer for two decades, retired in 2023. He was succeeded by Natalie Wolfsen, previously CEO of AssetMark. Charles Goldman serves as Chairman of the Board.

=== Mergers and acquisitions ===
Since 2018, Orion has grown through a series of acquisitions across financial planning, compliance, risk analytics, client relationship management, and investment management. These have included:

Company	Service/Focus	Year Acquired
FTJ FundChoice	Turnkey asset management platform (TAMP)	2018
Advizr	Financial planning software	2019
Brinker Capital	Turnkey asset management programs (TAMP) and investments	2020 (merger)
HiddenLevers	Risk analytics, stress testing, proposal tools	2021
BasisCode Compliance	Compliance management software	2021
Redtail Technology	Advisor-focused CRM software	2022
TownSquare Capital	Outsourced CIO (OCIO) and investment services	2022
Summit Wealth Systems	Data orchestration, advisor/client experience	2025

== Services ==
Its software and related tools cover areas such as portfolio management, financial planning, client relationship management, compliance, and custodial integrations, while the company also offers outsourced investment management.

Key areas include:

- Portfolio management and accounting: Software for billing, trading, reporting, and analytics, including features for direct indexing, business intelligence, and risk analysis.
- Financial planning: Capabilities expanded through the 2019 acquisition of Advizr, a provider of financial planning software.
- Client relationship management (CRM): Services enhanced by the 2022 acquisition of Redtail Technology, a CRM platform for financial advisors.
- Investment solutions: Investment management through Orion Portfolio Solutions (its TAMP business), investments through Brinker Capital Investments, and outsourced chief investment officer (OCIO) services and high-net-worth services from Wealth Advisory. Orion’s open architecture platform provides access to 1,500 models across 225 asset managers.
- Advisor and client interfaces: Tools such as branded client portals and mobile applications. Following the 2025 acquisition of Summit Wealth Systems, Orion launched the Summit Experience, a combined advisor and client platform.
- Compliance: Compliance software developed internally and through the 2021 acquisition of BasisCode Compliance.
- Integrations: Orion supports more than 500 technology integrations, including connections with major custodians, including Charles Schwab, Fidelity, and BNY Pershing, supporting account management, data flow, and trade execution.
