= Stifel Theatre =

Civic performing arts building in St. Louis, Missouri

Coordinates: 38.6277°N 90.2019°W

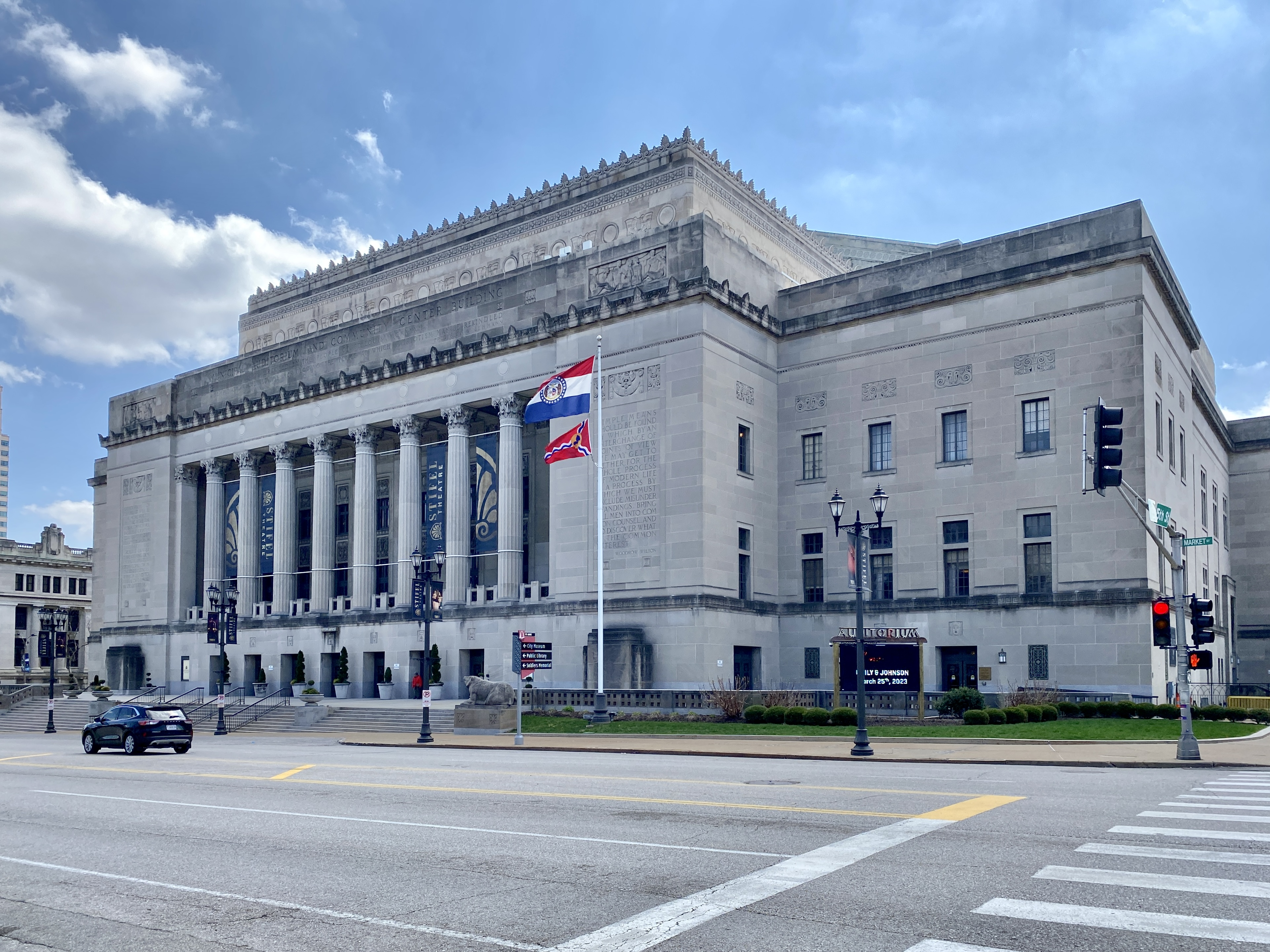
- Facade of venue, 2023
- Interactive map of Stifel Theatre
- Former names: Municipal Opera House (1934–1943); Kiel Opera House (1943–2010); Peabody Opera House (2010–18)
- Address: 1400 Market St; St. Louis, Missouri 63103-2609
- Location: Downtown West
- Owner: SLB Acquisition Holdings
- Capacity: 3,100
- Public transit: MetroBus; Red Blue; At Civic Center

Construction
- Groundbreaking: August 1932
- Opened: April 21, 1934
- Closed: May 7, 1991—September 30, 2011
- Reopened: October 1, 2011
- Rebuilt: 2009-11
- Cost: $1 million ($23.6 million in 2025 dollars)
- Architect: LaBeaume & Klein

Website
- Venue website
- Kiel Opera House
- U.S. National Register of Historic Places
- Area: 6.4 acres (2.6 ha)
- NRHP reference No.: 00000016
- Added to NRHP: February 11, 2000

The Stifel Theatre (originally known as the Municipal Opera House and formerly the Kiel Opera House and Peabody Opera House) is a civic performing arts building located in St. Louis, Missouri.

== About the venue ==
Founded as the "Kiel Opera House" (in honor of former St. Louis Mayor Henry Kiel), opened in 1934 as a part of the "Municipal Auditorium and Opera House". The theatre operated until 1991, when it and the adjacent Kiel Auditorium were closed so the auditorium could be demolished and replaced by the Kiel Center, now known as Enterprise Center. When the auditorium was slated for demolition, the local consortium who owned the St. Louis Blues ice hockey team, Kiel Center's main tenant, promised to rehabilitate the opera house as well. Neither that group nor the Bill Laurie family who bought the Blues in 1998, however, renovated the building, instead claiming that they had fulfilled their financial obligations.

In June 2009, the St. Louis Board of Aldermen voted 25–1 to subsidize the renovation and reopening of the theatre under the direction of the Blues' new owners, Sports Capital Partners. The subsidies were funded by municipal bonds and state/federal historic tax credits. On July 12, 2010, it was announced that the name was changing to the "Peabody Opera House", named after the company Peabody Energy. The renovation lasted for fourteen months and included the construction of a new entrance for the building.

On October 1, 2011, the Peabody Opera House opened for the first time since the $79 million renovation. The show featured personalities such as Jay Leno, Aretha Franklin, and Chuck Berry and was attended by a full house of 3,100. Since its reopening, it has played host to a diverse variety of performing acts, including touring musicians, comedians, live theatre and dance, and social and political events. On July 16, 2018, it was announced that the building had entered into a 10-year naming rights agreement with Stifel Financial Corp. and would be renamed Stifel Theatre.

== St. Louis Symphony Orchestra ==
From 1934 until 1968, the Opera House was home to the St. Louis Symphony Orchestra. In April 1966, the Symphony's Board voted to purchase the St. Louis Theater on Grand Blvd. and began extensive renovations. The theater was renamed Powell Hall and remains the home of the SLSO. In 2023 the St. Louis Symphony returned to Stifel Theater for select concerts while Powell Hall goes through extensive renovations and additions.

== Notable events ==
On June 20, 1965, Frank Sinatra, Dean Martin, and Sammy Davis Jr. with Johnny Carson as the emcee (subbing for Joey Bishop who was out with a bad back) performed their only televised concert together during the heyday of the Rat Pack. A closed-circuit broadcast done as a fundraiser for Dismas House (the first halfway house for ex-convicts). After being thought lost for thirty years, Paul Brownstein tracked down a print of the show that had been sitting in a closet in St. Louis. It has since been broadcast on Nick at Nite (in 1998) as part The Museum of Television & Radio Showcase series and released on DVD as part of the "Ultimate Rat Pack Collection: Live & Swingin'".

On July 11, 1978, The Rolling Stones performed one sold-out show at the theatre. Bill Graham was the tour promoter. The Stones used a stripped back, minimal stage presentation compared to previous tours with an emphasis solely on music and attitude rather than presenting a grandiose extravaganza. Because of the limited seating at such an excellent venue, fans who were unable to purchase tickets gathered outside the building before showtime in protest. A police force with dogs was needed to keep the peace.
