= Turnkey asset management program =

A turnkey asset management program (TAMP) is a program for independent financial advisors, typically fiduciaries, to outsource the management of some or all of their clients' assets. Certified public accountants, law firms and banks have adopted use of the program relatively recently.

Financial advisors use TAMPs to gain access to managed account services that allow them to offload time-consuming functions, such as research, portfolio construction, performance reporting, and tax optimization and reporting.

TAMPs are a form of fee-account, which charge fees based on a percentage of the total assets managed in the program. TAMPs appeal to independent financial advisors who are building a fee-only business, because they can avoid the cost of building their own fee-accounts platform and can implement a TAMP in about 90 days, instead of the year or longer required to develop the same capabilities in-house.

TAMPs help independent advisors avoid employee hiring and payroll costs related to internal administration and research. Because TAMPs serve financial advisors, individual retail investors are not able to directly invest their assets in a TAMP.

== History ==
The foundation for fee-accounts was created in 1974 with the passage of the Employee Retirement Income Security Act (ERISA), which brought fiduciary law to the forefront, granted legal liability for trust officers and elevated consumer awareness of investing. Fixed commissions ended on May 1, 1975, when the legislation became law, which opened the door for the first discount brokerage firms such as the Charles Schwab Corporation, Scottrade and TD Ameritrade.

In the mid-1980s, the first TAMPs emerged. By 1986, $1 billion in assets was invested in a number of TAMPs, including PMC (absorbed by Envestnet, London Pacific Advisors, now SunGard Advisor Technology and Brinker Capital). By 1994, TAMP assets had increased to $4 billion, and over the next two years, the TAMP market grew to $16 billion in assets. This growth continued throughout the 1990s with the emergence of firms such as AdvisorPort, Asset Mark, Envestnet, Fund Quest and Lockwood. By 2001, the TAMP market was at $78 billion.

Since 1999, the TAMP market has experienced consolidation through acquisitions and mergers to one-in-three TAMPs each year. TAMP growth and consolidation has continued in the 21st century and by 2010, TAMP assets reached $255 billion with the ten largest firms accounting for nearly all assets under management. Those firms included PNC Managed Investments, Brinker Capital, Envestnet, Fund Quest, Assetmark, Lockwood, Prudential Financial, Russell, SEI Investments and SunGard.

The growth of the TAMP market (1000% since the market first emerged) remains small in comparison to the overall market for fee-accounts, which was measured by Tiburon at $1.5 trillion in assets at the beginning of 2010.

== TAMP Market Segments ==
TAMP providers vary widely in terms of investment philosophies and services, with some specializing in mutual funds, others offering separately managed accounts, or passive investing versus active investing – others offer a platform of multiple options. Market research indicates that two-thirds of TAMP assets are managed by mutual fund TAMPs.

In addition to asset management services, many TAMPs offer additional support and services for financial advisors, such as training programs for financial advisors with Genworth Wealth Management and Loring Ward recognized by Tiburon as offering "extensive" training and educational programs. Companies such as EBI Portfolios (a UK based TAMP), offer a variety of additional services such as automatic portfolio rebalancing, research requests, turnkey workbooks, risk profiling and repository access to evidence-based documents for their users.
