= SLB Acquisition Holdings LLC =

American consortium, NHL team owner

- Type: Private
- Industry: Professional sports, property management, entertainment
- Founded: 2012; 14 years ago
- Headquarters: St. Louis, Missouri, United States
- Area served: St. Louis
- Key people: Thomas Stillman
- Products: Professional sports teams, sports venues
- Subsidiaries: New Orleans Pelicans; St. Louis Blues; Enterprise Center; Stifel Theatre

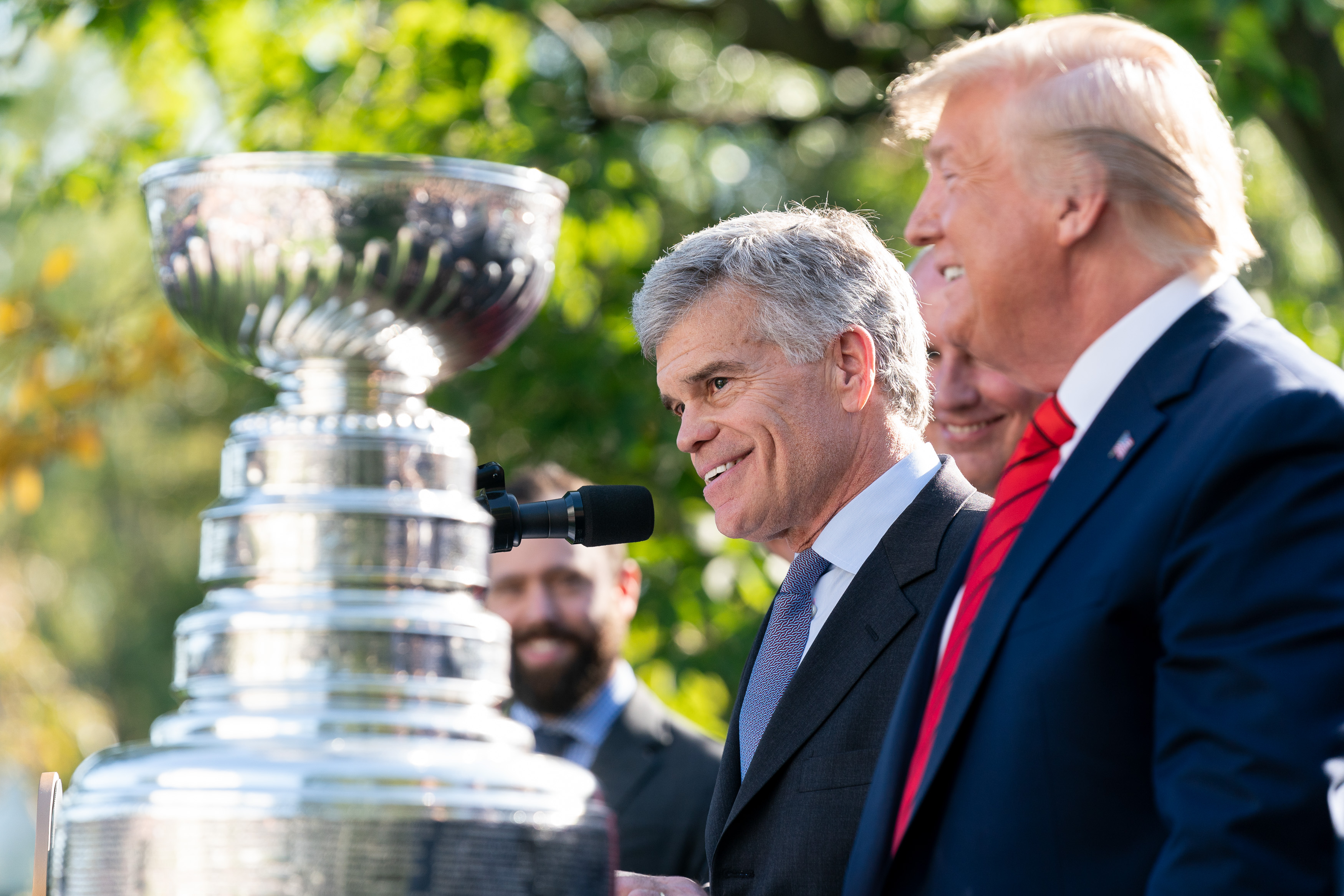
Tom Stillman and President Trump at the celebration of the 2019 Stanley Cup Champion St. Louis Blues

SLB Acquisition Holdings, LLC is a consortium based in St. Louis, Missouri. It was founded in 2012 by American businessman Thomas H. Stillman and 15 local investors including the former US UN ambassador and senator John C. Danforth.

== History ==
On May 10, 2012, it became clear that SLB Acquisition Holdings, LLC had acquired St. Louis Blues, the Peoria Rivermen, the lease and daily care of Enterprise Center, as well as a majority stake in Stifel Theatre from SCP Worldwide for a purchase price of $130 million.

"We are honored and humbled to take ownership of the St. Louis Blues. Our new ownership group is 100 percent local, and we are 100 percent committed to the Blues and to St. Louis. We see the Blues as an important civic institution, and we know what the Blue Note means to this city and to the best fans in the NHL." - Majority Owner and Chairman Thomas H Stillman

— Toronto Sun

Stillman later spun off the Peoria Riverman to Canucks Sports & Entertainment who relocated them to Utica, New York as the Utica Comets.

== Assets ==
- St. Louis Blues – (NHL)
- Enterprise Center – Operations only, the City of St. Louis is the owner
- Stifel Theatre – Majority owner

=== Former assets ===
- Peoria Rivermen – (AHL)

== Shareholders ==
=== Majority owner ===
- Thomas H. Stillman – Chairman of the board and CEO, Summit Distributing.

=== Minority owners ===
- James A. Cooper – CEO, Thompson Street Capital Partners.
- Christopher B. Danforth – Owner and president, Kennelwood Pet Resorts.
- John C. Danforth – Shareholder, Bryan Cave, LLP. Danforth was former senator of the state of Missouri & US UN ambassador.
- James L. Johnson – Senior vice president, Stifel Nicolaus & Co.
- James P. Kavanaugh – CEO, World Wide Technology, Inc.
- Jerald L. Kent – Chairman and CEO, TierPoint, LLC & CEO, Cequel III.
- Donn S. Lux – Chairman of the board and CEO, Luxco.
- W. Stephen Maritz – Chairman of the board, Maritz Inc.
- Scott B. McCuaig – Former president, Stifel Nicolaus & Co.
- Edward M. Potter – Private investor.
- John S. Ross, Jr. – President, Summit Development Group.
- Thomas F. Schlafly – Co-owner, Thompson Coburn & Founder, The Saint Louis Brewery.
- Michael W. Riney – Founder and managing director of QRM Capital
- Andrew C. Taylor – Chairman of the board and CEO, Enterprise Holdings, Inc.
- Jo-Ann Taylor Kindle – President, Enterprise Holdings Foundation.
