= Enterprise Center =

Arena in St. Louis, Missouri, US

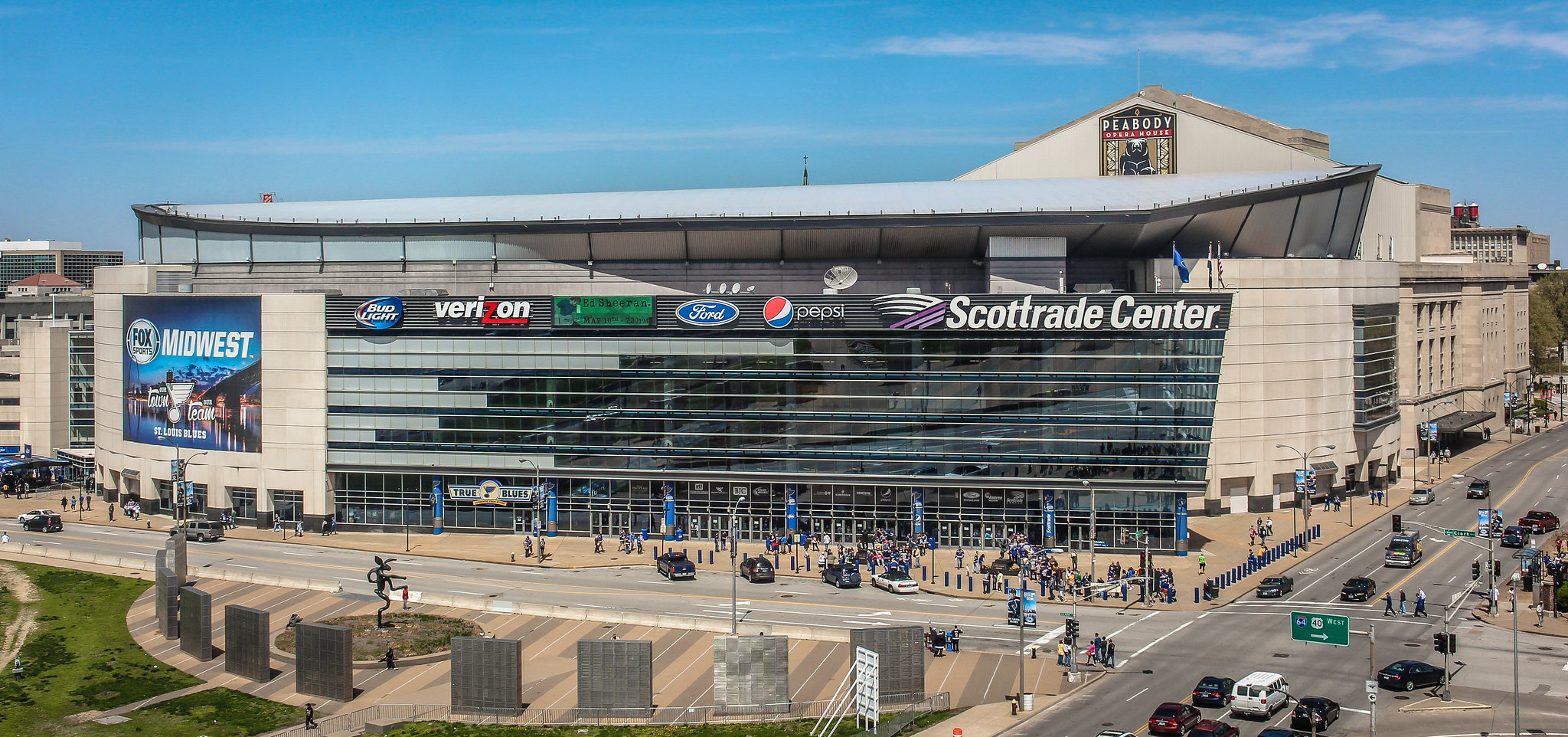
- Enterprise Center (then known as the Scottrade Center)

- Location in Missouri Location in the United States
- Former names: Kiel Center (1994–2000); Savvis Center (2000–2006); Scottrade Center (2006–2018)
- Address: 1401 Clark Avenue
- Location: St. Louis, Missouri, U.S.
- Coordinates: 38°37′36″N 90°12′9″W
- Owner: City of St. Louis
- Operator: SLB Acquisition Holdings LLC , GBC 996 Inc.
- Capacity: Ice hockey: 18,096; Concerts: 22,000
- Public transit: Red Blue; At Civic Center

Construction
- Groundbreaking: December 14, 1992
- Opened: October 8, 1994
- Cost: $135 million ($310 million in 2025 dollars)
- Architect: Ellerbe Becket
- Structural engineers: The Consulting Engineers Group, Inc.
- Services engineers: William Tao & Associates, Inc.
- General contractor: J.S. Alberici Construction
- Main contractors: DKW Construction, Inc.

Tenants
- St. Louis Blues (NHL) (1995–present); St. Louis Ambush (NPSL) (1994–2000); Saint Louis Billikens (NCAA) (1994–2008); St. Louis Stampede (AFL) (1995–1996); St. Louis Vipers (RHI) (1995–1997, 1999); St. Louis Steamers (MISL) (2004–2006); RiverCity Rage (NIFL) (2006)

Website
- enterprisecenter.com

Enterprise Center is an 18,096-seat multi-purpose indoor arena located in downtown St. Louis, Missouri, United States. Its primary tenant is the St. Louis Blues of the National Hockey League, but it is also used for other functions, such as NCAA basketball, NCAA hockey, concerts, professional wrestling and more. In a typical year, the facility hosts about 175 events. Industry trade publication Pollstar has previously ranked Enterprise Center among the top ten arenas worldwide in tickets sold to non-team events, but the facility has since fallen into the upper sixties, as of 2017.

The arena opened in 1994 as the Kiel Center. It was known as the Savvis Center from 2000 to 2006, and Scottrade Center from 2006 to 2018. On May 21, 2018, the St. Louis Blues and representatives of Enterprise Holdings, based in St. Louis, announced that the naming rights had been acquired by Enterprise and that the facility's name, since July 1, 2018, adopted its current name.

== History ==
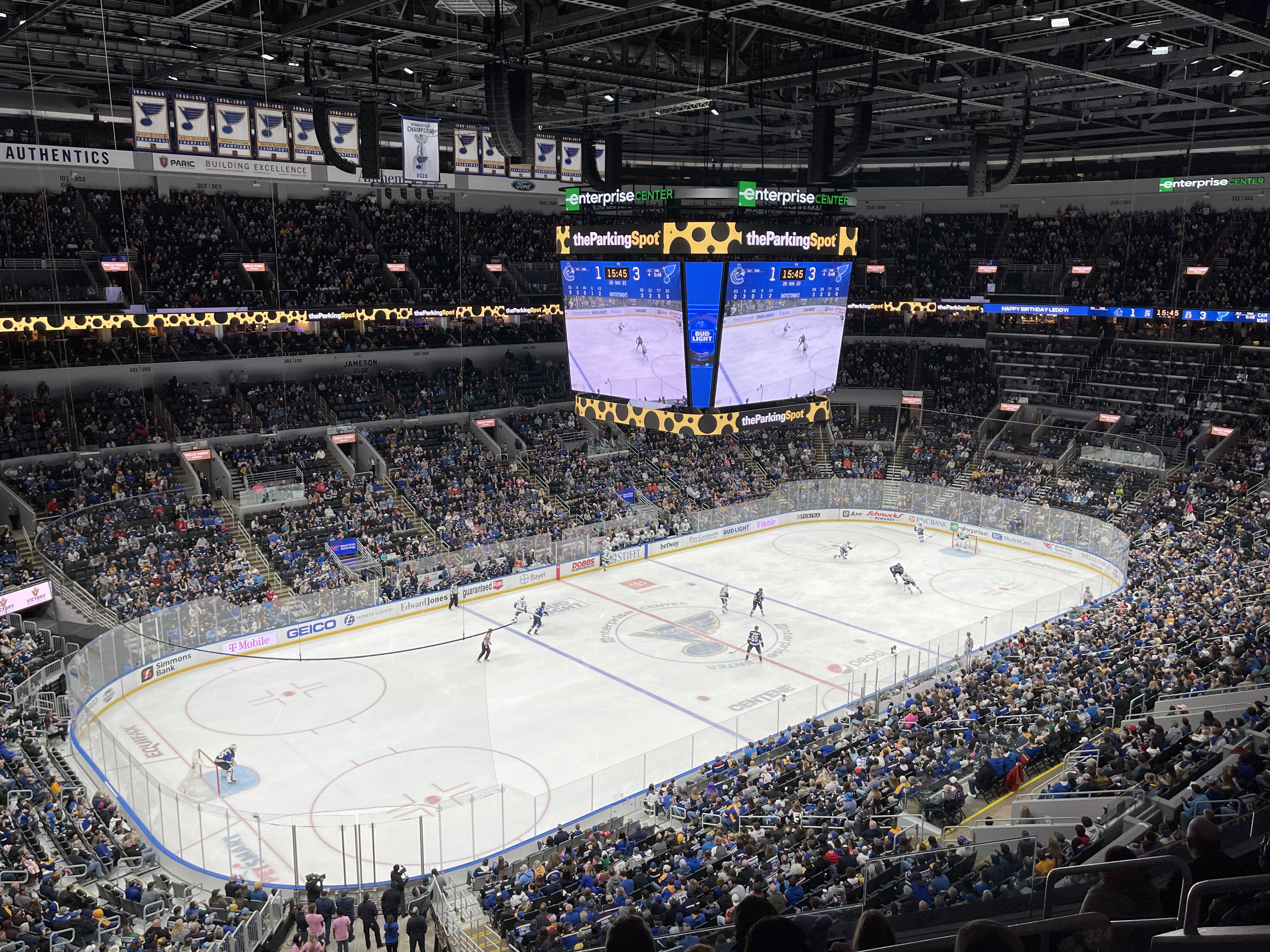
Interior of Enterprise Center during a Blues game

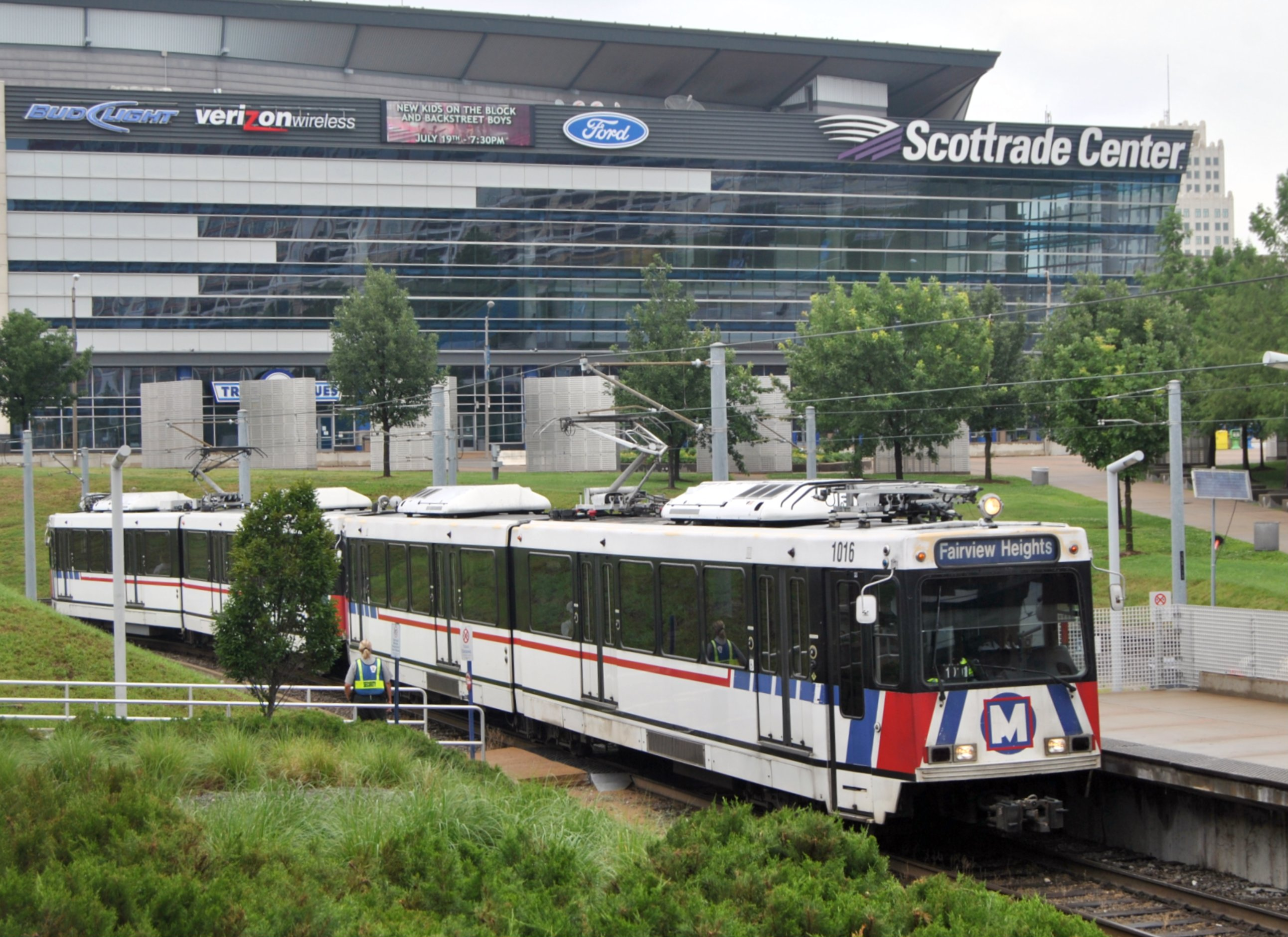
Exterior of the then-Scottrade Center

The site was home to Charles H. Turpin's Booker T. Washington Theater, which was replaced by the Municipal Auditorium, a venue renamed for mayor Henry Kiel after his death in 1943.

Originally named the Kiel Center, the arena was opened in 1994 to replace Kiel Auditorium, where the Saint Louis University college basketball team had played, which was torn down in December 1992. The Blues had played in the St. Louis Arena prior to moving into Kiel Center in 1994; however, they would not play in the arena until January 1995 due to the lockout that delayed the start of the 1994–95 season. The first professional sports match was played by the St. Louis Ambush, an indoor soccer team. The building is currently known as Enterprise Center, after naming rights were sold in May 2018 to Enterprise Holdings. The Kiel name still exists on the adjoining parking structure and the building cornerstone. Signs for the nearby MetroLink stop have been changed to read "Civic Center", since the building has been renamed four times in its history.

The Opera House portion of the building was not razed when the original Auditorium was but remained closed since 1992, as members of Civic Progress, Inc., who promised to pay for the renovation of the Opera House, reneged on that promise, while opposing all outside efforts to achieve that renovation. In June 2009, the St. Louis Board of Aldermen voted 25–1 to subsidize the renovation and reopening of the Opera House under the direction of its new owners, Sports Capital Partners (who also own the Blues). The subsidies were funded by municipal bonds and state/federal historic tax credits. On July 12, 2010, it was announced that the name of the opera house would be changed to the Peabody Opera House, named after the company Peabody Energy. On October 1, 2011, the Peabody Opera House opened for the first time since the $79 million renovation. It is now known as the Stifel Theatre after naming rights were purchased by the locally based investment bank.

Through its history, the arena has been known as Kiel Center until 2000, Savvis Center from 2000 to 2006, Scottrade Center from 2006 to 2018, and Enterprise Center since July 2018. For Blues games, Tom Calhoun serves as public address announcer and Jeremy Boyer is the arena organist. National anthems are performed by a rotating group of local singers and musicians. Previous anthem singer Charles Glenn retired in 2018 due to health concerns and a relocation to San Diego, but he has returned to St. Louis to sing on multiple occasions including the 2019 Stanley Cup run. Head Ice Technician Jim Schmuke has been employed there since August 1994 and has been with the St.Louis Blues organization since 1979.

The largest crowd to attend an event at the arena was 22,612, which happened twice during the 2007 Missouri Valley Conference men's basketball tournament. The largest non-sporting event crowd was for a Bon Jovi concert in May 2011 as part of the Bon Jovi Live Tour, with 20,648 in attendance.

A three-phase renovation of the arena began in 2017 and was completed in 2019, with all building works being done in the hockey offseason to minimize schedule disruption. The first phase was largely composed of engineering upgrades (new lighting, sound, HVAC, and ice plant), improved IT infrastructure including free Wi-Fi for patrons, and rebuilt dressing rooms, as well as a new scoreboard and replacement of some lower-tier seating on the west end (where the Blues shoot twice) with "theater boxes". Phase two saw the replacement of all upper-tier seats, along with "theater boxes" being added to the east end, and a rebuilt lower-tier concourse with new club areas for premium ticketholders as well as a beer garden opening onto 14th Street. The third and final phase included the replacement of lower-tier seats and renovations to private boxes.

== Naming rights ==
Blues management decried its former naming-rights deal with locally-based tech company SAVVIS, as much of the compensation was in Savvis shares, then riding high. However, when the tech bubble burst, the team was left with nearly worthless shares.

In September 2006, locally-based Scottrade founder Rodger O. Riney and chief marketing officer Chris Moloney announced a partnership with the St. Louis Blues hockey club and arena. The new name of the arena, Scottrade Center, was revealed in a joint press conference. Terms of the deal were not disclosed, but were described as "long-term and significant", by Moloney. Both Scottrade and the Blues said the agreement was "equitable" to both parties. Most of the signage and other promotions were changed to Scottrade Center prior to the first home game of the Blues on October 12, 2006. The Sports Business Journal in March 2007 described it as "one of the fastest naming rights deals in history."

Scottrade announced on October 24, 2016, that it was being sold to TD Ameritrade for $4 billion. It was originally believed that once the deal closed, Scottrade Center would become the TD Ameritrade Center in a naming rights deal set to run until 2021. However, less than a year later, TD Ameritrade announced that it would give back its naming rights upon the closure of the Scottrade acquisition.

On May 21, 2018, Enterprise Holdings, based in St. Louis, and the St. Louis Blues announced that beginning July 1, the facility would be known as Enterprise Center. The 15-year agreement calls for interior and exterior signage featuring the Enterprise logo.

== Current tenants ==
It is the home of the St. Louis Blues of the National Hockey League. In addition to the NHL franchise, the facility has hosted the annual Missouri Valley Conference men's basketball tournament since 1995, commonly referred to as "Arch Madness", with the winner receiving an automatic berth to the NCAA tournament. The University of Illinois and University of Missouri play their annual men's basketball rivalry game at Enterprise Center each season, typically on the Saturday before Christmas.

Enterprise Center also hosts a variety of non-sporting events each year, including concerts, ice shows, family events, professional wrestling, and other events. On average, the facility sees about 175 total events per year, drawing nearly two million guests annually to downtown St. Louis.

The facility is frequently chosen by the NCAA to host championship events, including its men's hockey "Frozen Four" in 2007, the women's basketball Final Four in 2001 and 2009, wrestling championships in 2000, 2004, 2005, 2008, 2009, 2012, 2015, and 2017, and several men's and women's basketball Midwest Regional tournament games. After the Missouri Tigers joined the SEC in 2012, St. Louis was added to the list of cities that could serve as hosts for the men's SEC men's basketball tournament, doing so for the first time in March 2018, at the completion of the 2017–2018 regular season.

The building is operated by SLB Acquisition Holdings LLC, owner of the St. Louis Blues, under its chairman, Tom Stillman.

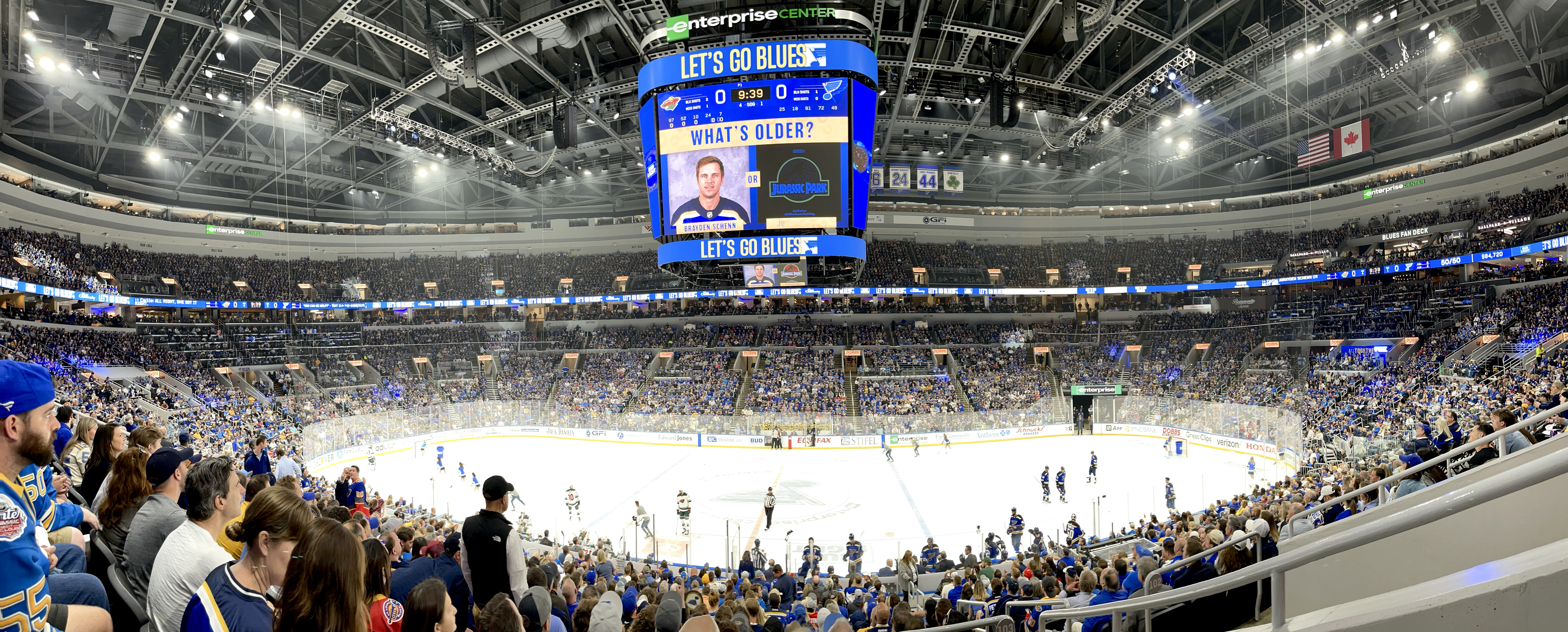
Interior of Enterprise Center in 2022

== Former tenants ==
Former tenants of Enterprise Center include the Saint Louis Billikens men's basketball team from Saint Louis University, St. Louis Vipers roller hockey team, St. Louis Ambush and St. Louis Steamers indoor soccer teams, the St. Louis Stampede arena football team, and the River City Rage indoor football team.

== Seating capacity ==
The facility's seating capacity for hockey has varied since opening.

Years	Capacity
1994–2000	19,260
2000–2007	19,022
2007–2017	19,150
2017–2019	18,724
2019–present	18,096

== Events ==
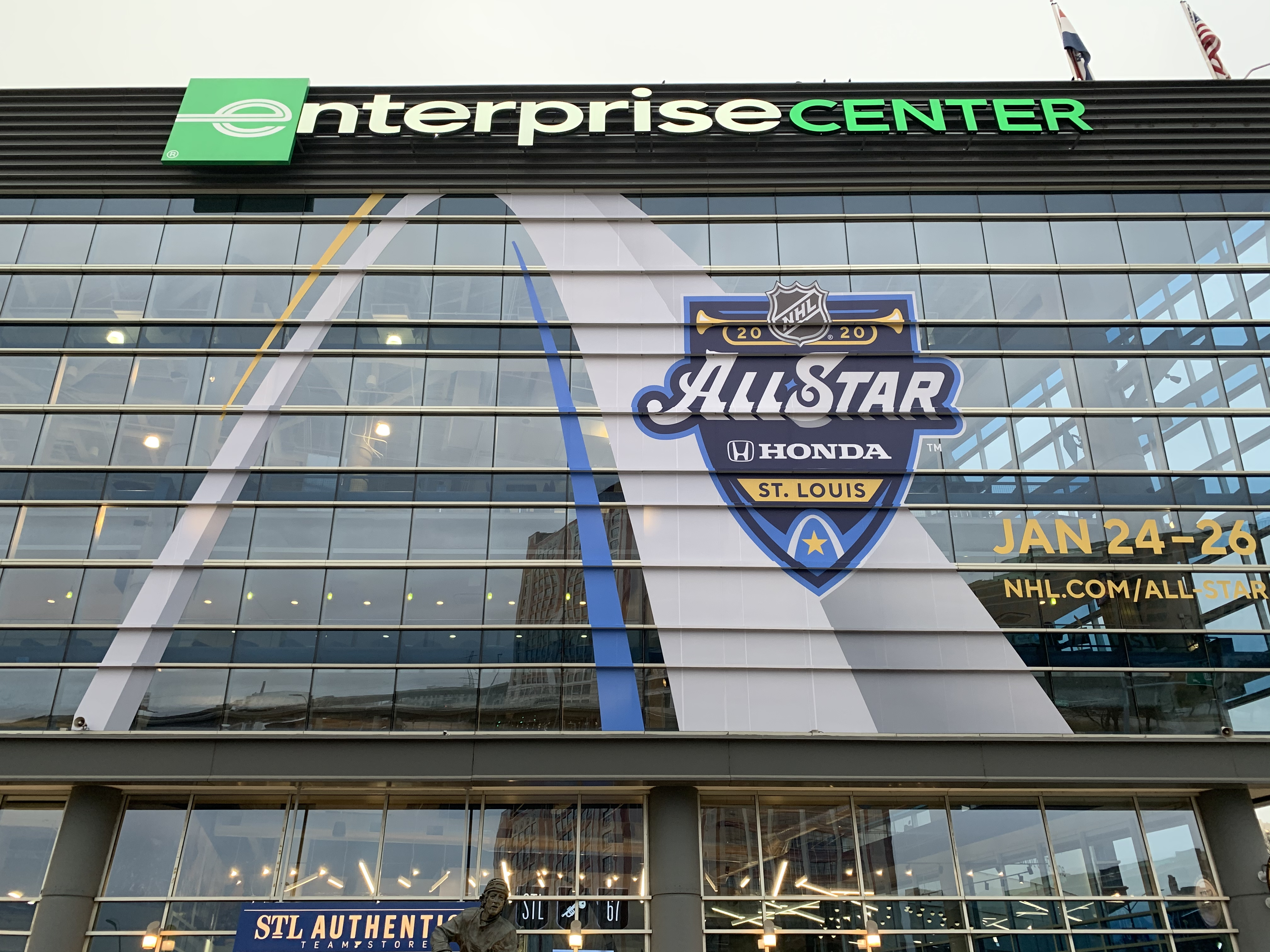
Exterior of Enterprise Center during the 2020 NHL All Star Game

=== Sports ===
- Since 1995, Enterprise Center has hosted the Missouri Valley Conference men's basketball tournament, commonly referred to as Arch Madness.
- The PBR has hosted an Unleash the Beast Series (formerly Bud Light Cup Series and Built Ford Tough Series) event at this venue annually since 1997, making it one of the longest-running events on the tour. In 2019 the event was named the Mason Lowe Memorial in honor of bull rider Mason Lowe, an Exeter, Missouri, native who died from injuries he sustained at a PBR Velocity Tour event in Denver on January 15, 2019.
- 1997 Conference USA men's basketball tournament.
- Formerly hosted the Mid-States Club Hockey Association Challenge Cup and Wickenheiser Cup finals for high school hockey teams in St. Louis (moved to Centene Community Ice Center)
- 1998 NCAA Division I men's basketball tournament Midwest Regional
- Women's Final Four in 2001 and 2009
- Hosted the 2006 State Farm U.S. Figure Skating Championships in January 2006, which was used as the primary means to select the United States Figure Skating team for the 2006 Winter Olympics.
- 2014, 2016, and 2026 NCAA men's basketball tournament Round of 64 and Round of 32
- NCAA Division I Wrestling Championships host in 2000, 2004, 2005, 2008, 2009, 2012, 2015 and 2017
- Hosts yearly NBA preseason games. The most recent game took place on October 24, 2014, between the Chicago Bulls and the Minnesota Timberwolves.
- In 2018, the Scottrade Center hosted the Southeastern Conference men's basketball tournament for the first time in the arena's history.
- In 2019, Enterprise Center hosted the Stanley Cup Final for the first time when the Blues faced the Boston Bruins in games: three, four and six.
- The facility hosted the 2020 NHL All-Star Game.
- The facility planned to host the 2020 NCAA Division I men's basketball tournament first and second rounds, but the tournament was cancelled due to the effects of the COVID-19 pandemic.
- On March 29, 2025, the first Professional Women's Hockey League (PWHL) game in St. Louis was played at the arena between the Ottawa Charge and the Boston Fleet. The Charge won 2–1 in front of 8,578 fans.
- 2025 NCAA Division I men's ice hockey tournament Frozen Four
- 2026 Prevagen U.S. Figure Skating Championships

=== MMA and boxing ===
- Hosted the Cory Spinks vs. Zab Judah undisputed welterweight title fight in 2005, with more than 22,000 fans in attendance. Spinks and fellow St. Louis native Devon Alexander were regularly featured on Don King-promoted cards at Enterprise Center throughout the late 2000s. The last major pro boxing event at the arena was Alexander vs. Marcos Maidana in 2011.
- The first MMA card at the venue was Strikeforce: Lawler vs. Shields in 2009, featuring Robbie Lawler who at the time trained in nearby Granite City, Illinois in the main event. Strikeforce would return twice to Enterprise Center in 2010, first with Strikeforce: Heavy Artillery and then with Strikeforce: Henderson vs. Babalu II. Bellator MMA debuted at the venue in 2015, with Bellator 138: Unfinished Business featuring Kimbo Slice facing Ken Shamrock. That promotion has since held two other cards at Enterprise Center, including the Bellator 157: Dynamite II MMA/kickboxing supercard on June 25, 2016, highlighted by House Springs, Missouri native Michael Chandler winning the Bellator Lightweight Championship by knocking out Patricky Freire. The Ultimate Fighting Championship made its St. Louis debut in 2018 with UFC Fight Night: Stephens vs. Choi, and returned in 2024 with UFC on ESPN: Lewis vs. Nascimento.
- Annually hosts the "Guns 'n' Hoses" amateur boxing/MMA show, where local police officers and firefighters fight to benefit the BackStoppers, a charity that supports families of first responders who have died in the line of duty. Held on the night before Thanksgiving, it traditionally draws a full house.

=== Wrestling ===
- Badd Blood: In Your House (1997)
- Survivor Series 1998
- Raw is Owen (1999)
- No Mercy 2001
- Judgment Day 2007
- Elimination Chamber 2010
- Royal Rumble 2012
- Raw 1000 (2012)
- Extreme Rules 2013
- Survivor Series 2014
- Battleground 2015
- Money in the Bank 2017
- Backlash 2025

Many historic WWE moments have taken place at the Enterprise Center. Former WWE and World Heavyweight Champion Kane made his WWE debut at this arena in 1997 at the event Badd Blood: In Your House. At that same event, the first Hell In A Cell match took place between Shawn Michaels and The Undertaker. The Rock won his first WWE Championship in the building at the Survivor Series event in 1998. Chris Jericho won his first World Championship in this arena at the No Mercy event in 2001, and won his latest World Championship in the arena at the Elimination Chamber event in 2010. In 2005 John Cena was revealed here as the first draft pick for Monday Night Raw, where he would remain for most of his career. Dave Batista won his second WWE Championship at the Elimination Chamber event in 2010. The 1000th episode of Monday Night Raw was also held there. At the 2014 Survivor Series Sting made his official debut in WWE. In November 2018 on SmackDown, Daniel Bryan won his fourth WWE Championship. Arguably the most emotional wrestling card held at the Enterprise Center was "Raw is Owen", held in the aftermath of Owen Hart's death the previous night at Over the Edge across the state in Kansas City. That night, ten matches were held with all booking put aside, and many wrestlers and fans paid tribute to the popular Hart.

=== Concerts ===
Date	Artist	Event	Opening act	Attendance	Revenue
October 21, 1994	Frank Sinatra	Sinatra in Concert	Tom Dreesen	Unknown	Unknown
September 27, 1997	Mary J. Blige	Share My World Tour	Usher		
July 3, 1996	Kiss	Alive/Worldwide Tour	Alice in Chains	16,310	$598,337
November 15, 1996	Phish	Phish Fall '96 Tour	none	Unknown	Unknown
September 2, 1999	Cher	Do You Believe? Tour	Julio Iglesias Jr. Michael McDonald	12,429	$639,510
May 21, 2000	Tina Turner	Twenty Four Seven Tour	Lionel Richie; Janice Robinson	15,147	$907,284
November 28, 2000	Prince	Hit + Run Tour			
July 15, 2001	Janet Jackson	All For You Tour	112	10,161	$534,815
November 28, 2001	U2	Elevation Tour	Garbage	16,051	$1,269,365
March 29, 2002	Kid Rock	Cocky Tour	Tenacious D		
June 22, 2002	Britney Spears	Dream Within a Dream Tour	O-Town	13,111	$822,184
July 15, 2002	Cher	Living Proof: The Farewell Tour	Cyndi Lauper	12,925	$848,364
October 9, 2002	Paul McCartney	Driving World Tour		14,878	$1,791,485
April 27, 2003	Matchbox Twenty, Sugar Ray		Maroon 5		
May 5, 2004	Prince	Musicology Live 2004ever		17,393	$953,651
September 25, 2004	Metallica	Madly in Anger with the World Tour		7,864	$431,610
July 9, 2005	Destiny's Child	Destiny Fulfilled... and Lovin' It			
December 14, 2005	U2	Vertigo Tour	Kanye West	19,923	$1,839,020
January 27, 2006	The Rolling Stones	A Bigger Bang Tour	Soulive		
January 15, 2007	Red Hot Chili Peppers	Stadium Arcadium World Tour			
January 22, 2007	High School Musical	High School Musical: The Concert	Jordan Pruitt	15,206	$772,296
July 2, 2007	The Police	The Police Reunion Tour	Fiction Plane	17,821	$1,872,140
July 18, 2007	Beyoncé	The Beyoncé Experience			
October 18, 2007	Miley Cyrus	Best of Both Worlds Tour	Jonas Brothers	13,982	$982,909
February 16, 2008	Kid Rock	Rock N' Roll Revival Tour	Dickey Betts & Great Southern, Rev Run		
August 23, 2008	Bruce Springsteen	Magic Tour		17,000	$1,445,159
November 17, 2008	Metallica	World Magnetic Tour	Down		$629,800
January 13, 2009	AC/DC	Black Ice World Tour	The Answer	14,394	$1,276,091
February 4, 2009 (Note: Originally 11 November 2008.)	Celine Dion	Taking Chances World Tour	Gordie Brown	17,283 / 17,283	$1,351,246
April 25, 2009	Taylor Swift	Fearless Tour	Gloriana; Kellie Pickler	13,764	$650,420
May 14, 2009	Elton John; Billy Joel	Face to Face 2009		19,692	$2,450,119
October 25, 2009	Bruce Springsteen	Working on a Dream Tour		11,178	$847,038
October 28, 2009	Miley Cyrus	Wonder World Tour	Metro Station	13,982	$982,909
May 4, 2010	Pearl Jam	Backspacer Tour			
October 8, 2010	Roger Waters	The Wall Live (2010–13)		12,574	$1,341,058
November 8, 2010	Justin Bieber	My World Tour	N/A	14,471	$207,896
April 10, 2011	Lil Wayne	I Am Music II Tour	Nicki Minaj Rick Ross Porcelain Black Travis Barker Mix Master Mike		
May 22, 2011	Bon Jovi	Bon Jovi Live		20,648	$1,575,841
August 20, 2011	Katy Perry	California Dreams Tour	Janelle Monáe; DJ Skeet Skeet	12,005	$497,910
May 25, 2012	Red Hot Chili Peppers	I'm with You World Tour	Little Dragon	12,831	$704,945
September 22, 2012	Rush	Clockwork Angels Tour		10,772	$790,134
October 27, 2012	Justin Bieber	Believe Tour	Carly Rae Jepsen	15,034	$1,108,442
November 1, 2012	Madonna	The MDNA Tour	Paul Oakenfold	16,022	$2,449,110
November 11, 2012	Paul McCartney	On the Run Tour			
February 2, 2013	Lady Gaga	Born This Way Ball	Madeon Lady Starlight		
March 13, 2013	Bon Jovi	Because We Can Tour		16,120	$1,262,376
March 18, 2013	Taylor Swift	The Red Tour	Ed Sheeran; Brett Eldredge	28,582	$2,346,203
March 19, 2013	Taylor Swift	The Red Tour	Ed Sheeran; Brett Eldredge	28,582	$2,346,203
August 8, 2013	Bruno Mars	The Moonshine Jungle Tour	Ellie Goulding	13,947	$950,707
November 19, 2013	Justin Timberlake	The 20/20 Experience World Tour	DJ Freestyle Steve	15,519	$1,540,510
December 14, 2013	Beyoncé	The Mrs. Carter Show World Tour	Luke James	14,079	$1,588,140
April 11, 2014	Billy Joel	Billy Joel in Concert		15,167	$1,436,167
June 4, 2014	Cher	Dressed to Kill Tour	Cyndi Lauper	13,463	$1,009,214
August 10, 2014	Miley Cyrus	Bangerz Tour	Lily Allen		
August 17, 2014	Katy Perry	Prismatic World Tour	Kacey Musgraves; Ferras	14,395	$1,463,826
October 3, 2014	Pearl Jam	Lightning Bolt Tour			
May 14, 2015	Rush	R40 Live Tour		13,096	$1,092,824
September 28, 2015	Taylor Swift	The 1989 World Tour	Vance Joy; Haim	29,688	$3,452,940
September 29, 2015	Taylor Swift	The 1989 World Tour	Vance Joy; Haim	29,688	$3,452,940
October 4, 2015	Ariana Grande	The Honeymoon Tour	Prince Royce; Who Is Fancy		
February 20, 2016	AC/DC	Rock or Bust World Tour	Tyler Bryant & The Shakedown	13,985	$1,520,878
April 19, 2016	Justin Bieber	Purpose World Tour	Post Malone; Moxie Raia	15,450	$1,433,791
June 26, 2016	Selena Gomez	Revival Tour	DNCE; Bahari	7,181	$448,623
July 21, 2016	Coldplay	A Head Full of Dreams Tour	Alessia Cara; Foxes	13,960	$1,547,633
August 5, 2016	Demi Lovato; Nick Jonas	Future Now Tour	Mike Posner		
December 31, 2016	Kid Rock		Tim Montana and The Shrednecks		
January 18, 2017	Red Hot Chili Peppers	The Getaway World Tour	Trombone Shorty and New Orleans Avenue; Jack Irons	13,836	$1,208,732
February 19, 2017	Bon Jovi	This House Is Not For Sale Tour	The Former Me	17,549	$1,181,078
April 5, 2017	Panic! at the Disco	Death of a Bachelor Tour	MisterWivesSaint Motel		
May 30, 2017	Roger Waters	Us + Them Tour		11,682	$1,083,554
October 22, 2017	Katy Perry	Witness: The Tour	Noah Cyrus		
November 16, 2017	Lady Gaga	Joanne World Tour		16,343	$1,577,704
March 14, 2018	P!nk	Beautiful Trauma World Tour	KidCutUp	15,026	$1,852,210
May 4, 2018	U2	Experience + Innocence Tour	N/A	16,300	$2,001,462
October 13, 2018	Foo Fighters	Concrete and Gold Tour	Gang of Youths		
October 19, 2018	Twenty One Pilots	The Bandito Tour	Awolnation; Max Frost		
October 20, 2018	Fleetwood Mac	An Evening with Fleetwood Mac			
October 30, 2018	Elton John	Farewell Yellow Brick Road Tour		15,495	$1,867,478
November 10, 2018	Drake & Migos	Aubrey & the Three Migos Tour	Roy Woods	17,418	$1,900,401
February 5, 2019	Panic! at the Disco	Pray for the Wicked Tour	Two Feet; Betty Who	14,636	$921,028
February 18, 2019	Travis Scott	Astroworld – Wish You Were Here Tour	Sheck Wes	13,047	$856,705
March 22, 2019	Michael Bublé	An Evening with Michael Bublé		12,837	$1,482,490
March 28, 2019	Justin Timberlake	The Man of the Woods Tour		17,351	$2,425,805
May 10, 2019	Cher	Here We Go Again Tour	Nile Rodgers; Chic	14,404	$1,617,911
June 18, 2019	Carrie Underwood	Cry Pretty Tour 360	Maddie & Tae, Runaway June	11,477	$901,721
June 30, 2019	Shawn Mendes	Shawn Mendes: The Tour	Alessia Cara	12,868	$818,495
July 6, 2019	Ariana Grande	Sweetener World Tour	Normani; Social House	14,474	$1,547,186
September 9, 2019	Backstreet Boys	DNA World Tour		13,888	$1,000,053
September 14, 2019	Jonas Brothers	Happiness Begins Tour	Bebe Rexha; Jordan McGraw	15,247	$1,629,711
October 26, 2019	Celine Dion	Courage World Tour		11,735	$1,591,985
February 5, 2020	The Lumineers	III: The World Tour	Mt. Joy; J.S. Ondara	10,742	$534,241
February 7, 2020	Post Malone	Runaway Tour	Swae Lee; Tyla Yaweh	13,387	$1,920,408
September 15, 2021	Harry Styles	Love On Tour	Jenny Lewis	17,171	$2,745,557
December 16, 2021	For King & Country	A Drummer Boy Christmas Tour			
February 23, 2022	Imagine Dragons	Mercury World Tour	Grandson	10,764	$947,172
March 20, 2022	Elton John	Farewell Yellow Brick Road Tour		13,801	$2,312,462
April 21, 2022	Bon Jovi	Bon Jovi 2022 Tour			
August 10, 2022	Machine Gun Kelly	Mainstream Sellout Tour	Travis Barker; Willow Smith	12,270	$746,000
September 10, 2022	Twenty One Pilots	The Icy Tour	Peter McPoland		
September 17, 2022	Post Malone	Twelve Carat Tour	Roddy Ricch	12,703	$1,729,229
September 18, 2022	Pearl Jam	Gigaton Tour			
October 9, 2022	Panic! at the Disco	Viva Las Vengeance Tour	Marina; Jake Wesley Rogers		
October 14, 2022	The Who	The Who Hits Back!			
October 22, 2022	Reba McEntire	Reba: Live in Concert	Terri Clark		
November 1, 2022	The Smashing Pumpkins	Spirits on Fire Tour	Jane's Addiction		
November 7, 2022	Carrie Underwood	Denim & Rhinestones Tour	Jimmie Allen		
November 15, 2022	Eagles	Hotel California 2022 Tour			
December 10, 2022	Trans-Siberian Orchestra	2022 Winter Tour			
April 14, 2023	Kane Brown	Drunk or Dreaming Tour	Dustin Lynch		
April 25, 2023	Lizzo	Special Tour	Latto	9,063	$841,371
April 30, 2023	Janet Jackson	Janet Jackson: Together Again	Ludacris		
July 30, 2023	Paramore	This is Why Tour	The Linda Lindas; Foals		
August 27, 2023	Jonas Brothers	Five Albums. One Night. The World Tour	Lawrence		
March 12, 2024	Olivia Rodrigo	Guts World Tour	Chappell Roan		
October 25, 2024	Usher	Usher: Past Present Future			
October 26, 2024	Usher	Usher: Past Present Future			
April 4, 2025	Kelsea Ballerini	Kelsea Ballerini - Live On Tour	MaRynn Taylor The Japanese House		
November 16, 2025	Brandy; Monica	The Boy Is Mine Tour	Muni Long; Jamal Roberts; Kelly Rowland		

== See also ==
- List of indoor arenas by capacity
- List of ice hockey arenas by capacity

== Notes ==
Events and tenants
Preceded by St. Louis Arena	Home of the St. Louis Blues; 1994 – present	Succeeded by current
Preceded by St. Louis Arena	Home of the St. Louis University Billikens; 1994 – 2008	Succeeded by Chaifetz Arena
Preceded by Wells Fargo Center; Philadelphia, Pennsylvania	Host of the NCAA Women's Final Four; 2001	Succeeded by Alamodome; San Antonio, Texas
Preceded by Bradley Center; Milwaukee, Wisconsin	Host of the Frozen Four; 2007	Succeeded by Pepsi Center; Denver, Colorado
Preceded by St. Pete Times Forum; Tampa, Florida	Host of the NCAA Women's Final Four; 2009	Succeeded by Alamodome; San Antonio, Texas
Preceded by Bridgestone Arena; Nashville, Tennessee	Host of the SEC men's basketball tournament 2018	Succeeded by Bridgestone Arena; Nashville, Tennessee
Preceded by SAP Center; San Jose, California	Host of the NHL All-Star Game; 2020	Succeeded by T-Mobile Arena; Las Vegas, Nevada
