= Rodger O. Riney =

American businessman

- Born: 1945 (age 80–81)
- Education: University of Missouri
- Known for: Founder of Scottrade

Rodger O. Riney (born 1945) is an American billionaire and the founder of Scottrade, a stockbrokerage that was acquired by TD Ameritrade in 2017.

== Early life ==
Riney was born in 1945 and was introduced to the stock market by his grandparents after giving him 10 shares of a stock. Riney earned a Bachelor of Science in civil engineering and a Master of Business Administration from the University of Missouri. He interned at Edward Jones Investments.

== Career ==
After the deregulation of the brokerage industry in 1975, Riney saw an opportunity to provide lower commission trades. In 1980, he founded Scottsdale Securities in Scottsdale, Arizona.

In 1981, Riney moved to St. Louis and opened a second branch. In 1996, the company launched its website and electronic trading platform. The number of trades increased by 15% per month, compounded monthly, for 39 months.

Riney's management methods have been described as conservative. Scottrade was regularly featured on the list of 100 best companies to work for by Fortune, for the fifth consecutive year in 2012. In September 2017, TD Ameritrade acquired Scottrade. In March 2019, Riney's family office Lightchain invested in Arch Oncology, a cancer drug startup. He is a member of the Board of Directors of the Multiple Myeloma Research Foundation. On the Forbes 400 2019 list, he ranked #225, with a net worth of $3.6 billion.

== Personal life ==
Riney and his wife, Paula, are members of Kirkwood Baptist Church in St. Louis County, Missouri.

=== Philanthropy ===
In the year after selling Scottrade, 2017, Riney donated $131 million to various causes. According to the St. Louis Post-Dispatch, it was $200 million in 2017 donated to charity.

Riney actively supports non-profit organizations, including the Alzheimer's Association. In 2019, he and his wife Paula donated $15 million to research on treatments for Alzheimer's and Parkinson's disease. Riney suffers from multiple myeloma and in 2017, he donated $5 million to fund research on the disease.

In 2018, he donated $20 million to the Washington University School of Medicine. As a result of the $20 million donation, the Paula C. and Rodger O. Riney Blood Cancer Research Initiative Fund was established.

In 2020, the Boston-based Dana-Farber Cancer Institute has announced a $16.5 million gift from the Paula and Rodger Riney Foundation in St. Louis to launch a research initiative focused on multiple myeloma.
