= Scottrade =

Defunct American stockbrokerage firm

- Formerly: Scottsdale Securities
- Industry: Financial services
- Founded: 1980; 46 years ago
- Defunct: September 18, 2017; 8 years ago
- Fate: Acquired by TD Ameritrade (later merged into Charles Schwab Corporation)
- Headquarters: 12800 Corporate Hill Drive, St. Louis, Missouri, United States
- Key people: Rodger O. Riney (CEO)
- Services: Stockbroker; Electronic trading platform Personal banking
- Revenue: $1.1 billion (2016)
- Number of employees: 3,700 (2016)
- Parent: TD Ameritrade

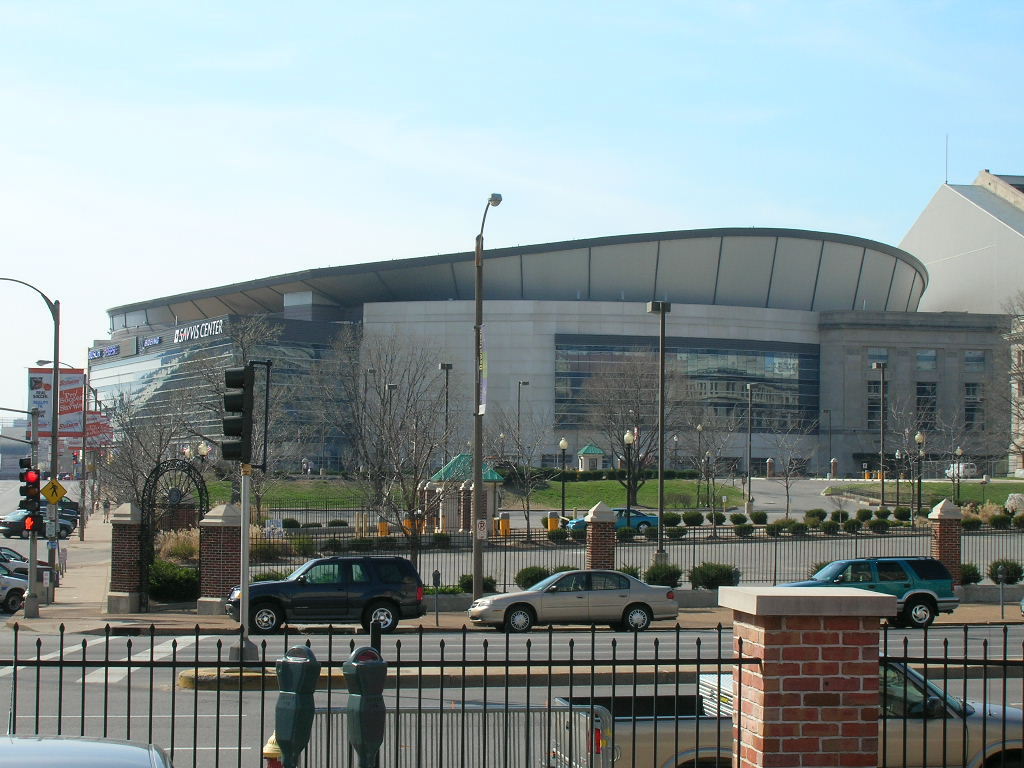
Exterior of the Scottrade Center, now called the Enterprise Center

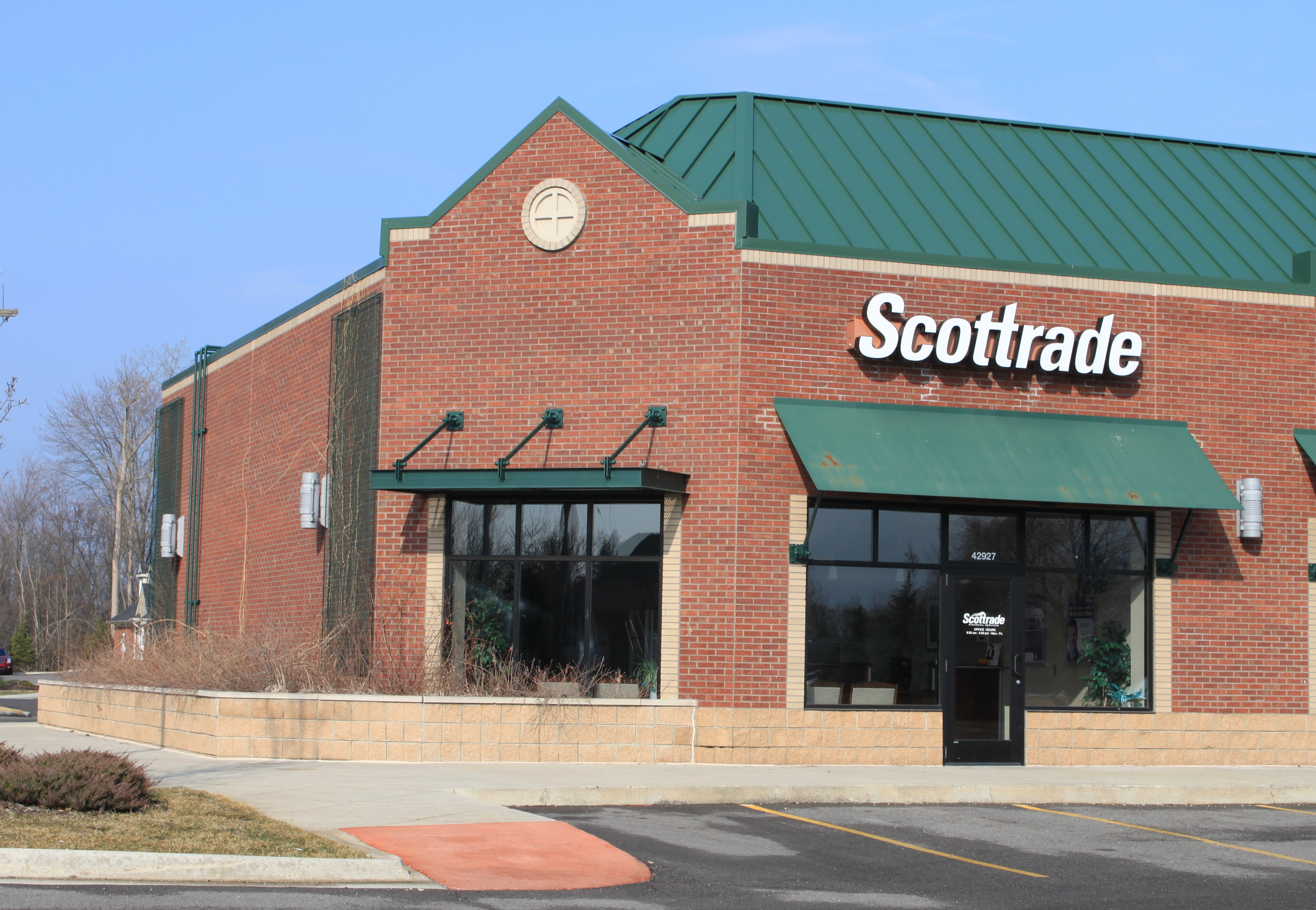
A now-shuttered Scottrade office in Canton Charter Township, Michigan

Scottrade was an American stockbroker and electronic trading platform that operated via mobile, on the web, and at branches. In September 2017, the stock brokerage division of the company was acquired by TD Ameritrade (later merged into Charles Schwab Corporation) and absorbed by that company; the banking division, Scottrade Bank, was acquired by Toronto-Dominion Bank and folded into TD Bank, N.A.

== History ==
In 1980, Rodger O. Riney founded Scottsdale Securities as a retail stockbroker in Scottsdale, Arizona. In 1981, Riney moved to St. Louis and opened a second branch.

In 1985, the company moved its headquarters to St. Louis.

By 1989, the company had 6 branches, and by 1991, the company had 15 branches.

In 1996, the company launched its website and electronic trading platform. The number of trades increased by 15% per month, compounded monthly, for 39 months.

By 2000, more than 90% of the company's trades were initiated online. The name of the company was changed to Scottrade because the domain Scottrade.com was available.

For 2 years after the dot-com bubble burst in 2000, revenue declined, although it fully recovered by 2004.

The company began offering Chinese-language services in its retail locations in 2001 and in 2003 made its online offerings available in Chinese.

Between 2000 and 2004, the company doubled the number of retail branch locations, reaching 211 in 2004.

By 2003, 98% of trades executed by the company were made online.

In 2004, Scottrade bought an office building outside of St. Louis next to its call center to use as its corporate offices.

In 2006, Scottrade purchased the naming rights for the stadium of the St. Louis Blues, which was renamed the Scottrade Center (now the Enterprise Center).

In 2008, the company launched Scottrade Bank. Ryan Busby, Branch Manager, relocates from GA to CT and opens a branch office in Waterford, CT

In June 2008, the United States Securities and Exchange Commission (SEC) charged the company with making fraudulent misrepresentations to clients about Nasdaq pre-open orders in violation of the Securities Exchange Act of 1934. The company consented to the entry of an order by the SEC that included a censure of Scottrade. The company also agreed to stop committing or causing any violations of the act, and paid a civil penalty of $950,000.

In 2009, the company launched a mobile app.

In January 2014, the company admitted to violating the record keeping requirements of federal security laws. The U.S. Securities and Exchange Commission submitted a request for data describing its trades as part of an investigation into whether an account had been hacked and unauthorized trades made for a customer. Every brokerage firm is required to keep trading records under the law. The company was missing data over a six-year period. As part of the settlement, the company agreed to admit fault and pay a fine of $2.5 million.

In October 2015, Scottrade revealed that, in late 2013 and early 2014, hackers accessed an encrypted database containing the personal records of more than 4.6 million clients, including names, street addresses, email addresses, social security numbers, and other sensitive account data. The company became aware of the breach when it was approached by Federal authorities who were investigating similar thefts at other financial service companies. As a precaution, Scottrade offered identity protection services to all affected customers. In November 2015, after performing its own investigation of the breach, the Financial Industry Regulatory Authority fined Scottrade $2.6 million for failing to store financial records and emails completely and securely and for failing to have an organized process for doing so. The company had deleted and failed to save over 168 million outgoing emails with trading information. Scottrade did not admit to or deny these charges, but consented to an entry of FINRA's findings and agreed to pay the fine.

In September 2017, the stock brokerage division of the company was acquired by TD Ameritrade (later merged into Charles Schwab Corporation) and absorbed by that company; the banking division, Scottrade Bank, was acquired by TD Bank Group and folded into TD Bank, N.A.
