= Scotty Bowman =

Canadian ice hockey coach (born 1933)

OC Scotty Bowman
- Hockey Hall of Fame, 1991 (Builder)
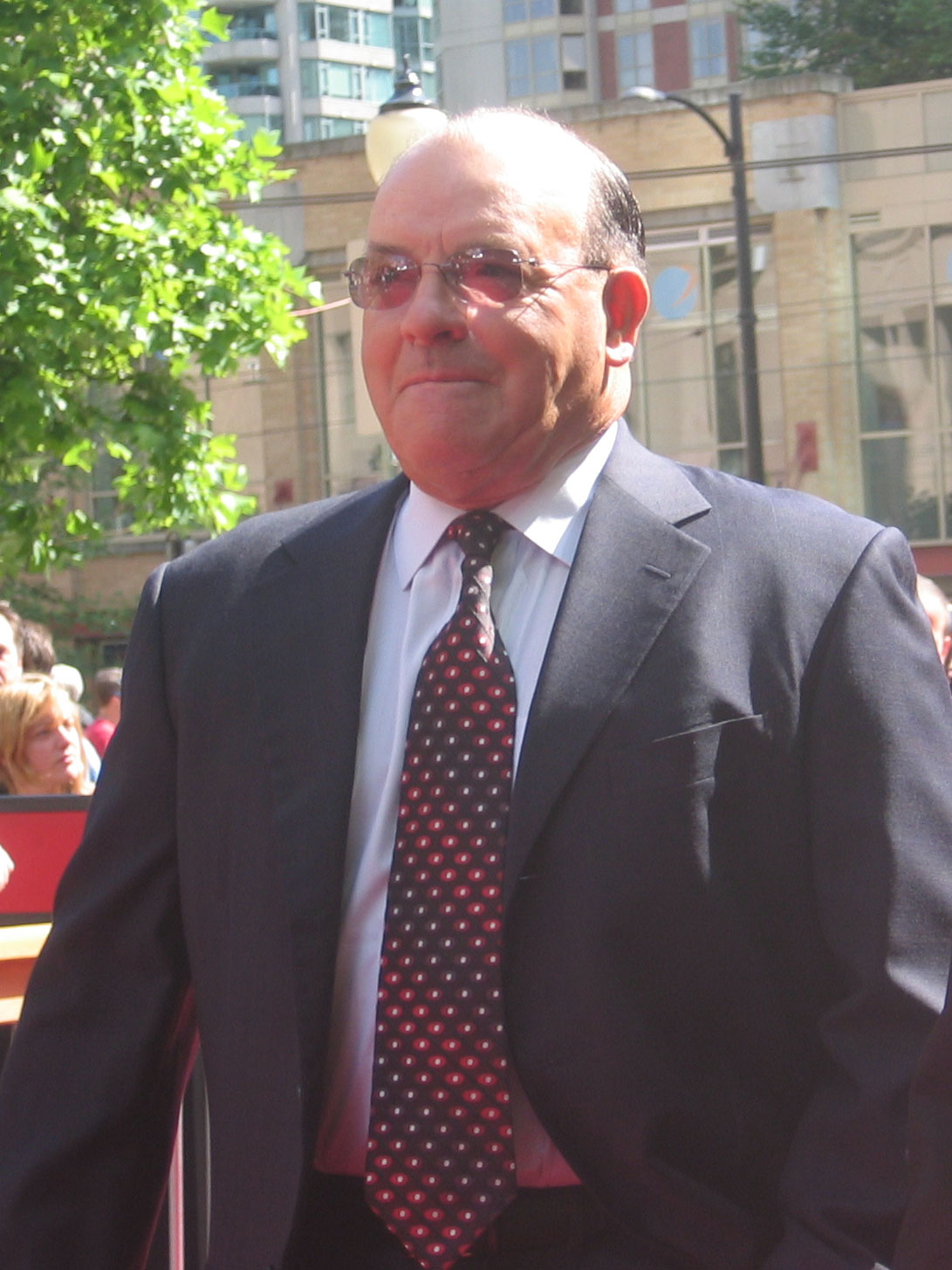
- Bowman in 2006
- Born: September 18, 1933 (age 93) Verdun, Quebec, Canada
- Coached for: St. Louis Blues; Montreal Canadiens; Buffalo Sabres; Pittsburgh Penguins; Detroit Red Wings
- Coaching career: 1956–2002

William Scott Bowman OC (born September 18, 1933) is a former Canadian professional ice hockey head coach. He holds the record for most wins in National Hockey League (NHL) history, with 1,244 wins in the regular season and 223 in the Stanley Cup playoffs, and his 14 Stanley Cup wins ranks second most of all time (Note: Bowman is second to Jean Béliveau's 17 Stanley Cup wins.) for any player, coach, or executive. He coached the St. Louis Blues, Montreal Canadiens, Buffalo Sabres, Pittsburgh Penguins, and Detroit Red Wings. He was most recently the senior advisor of hockey operations for the Chicago Blackhawks until he stepped down in July 2022. Bowman is widely regarded as the greatest coach in NHL history.

As head coach, Bowman has won a record nine Stanley Cup championships; five with the Canadiens (1973, 1976, 1977, 1978, and 1979), one with the Penguins (1992) and three with the Red Wings (1997, 1998, and 2002), making him the only head coach to lead three different teams to Stanley Cup victories. Bowman has also won the Stanley Cup five times as a member of an organization's front office. He was director of player development for the 1991 Penguins, consultant with the 2008 Detroit Red Wings, and senior advisor of hockey operations for the 2010, 2013, and 2015 Chicago Blackhawks. Bowman's teams also made it to the Stanley Cup Finals a record 13 times and the semifinals a record 16 times. Bowman won the Jack Adams Award in 1977 and 1996. In the 1976–77 season, he won a record 60 games, breaking his own record of 58 wins the year before. He broke his own record again in the 1995–1996 season, with 62 wins; overall, he held the record for 46 years, until 2023. (Note: The 2022–23 Boston Bruins set a new record, with 65 wins.) His eight losses in 1976–77 are a modern record for the fewest defeats incurred.

== Career ==
Bowman played junior league hockey with the Montreal Junior Canadiens until a fractured skull, resulting from an unintentional slash by Jean-Guy Talbot during the 1952 playoffs, ended his long term playing aspirations. (Note: Talbot was suspended for one year, though the suspension was rescinded in November 1951. He later played in the NHL, including three seasons with Bowman as his head coach.)

Bowman started coaching, in 1956, as an assistant to head coach Sam Pollock with the Ottawa-Hull Canadiens in the Quebec Junior Hockey League. The following season, as head coach, Bowman's team won the 1958 Memorial Cup. Soon thereafter, he moved into a coaching job with the Peterborough Petes of the Ontario Hockey League (OHA), the Montreal Canadiens' junior farm team.

=== St. Louis Blues (1967–1971) ===
Bowman moved into the NHL in 1967 when he joined the expansion St. Louis Blues as an assistant coach under general manager and head coach Lynn Patrick. However, Patrick resigned as coach after a slow start, and Bowman took over at age 34. The Blues made it to the Stanley Cup finals in their first three years of existence as Western Conference (Expansion) champs. Bowman assumed general manager duties after Patrick gave up that job in the summer of 1968. Bowman remained in St. Louis until the end of the 1970–71 season but left due to a dispute with team ownership.

=== Montreal Canadiens (1971–1979) ===
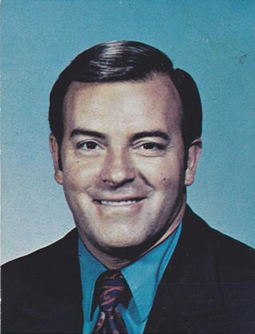
1975 card of Bowman as coach of the Montreal Canadiens

Al MacNeil took over as head coach of the Montreal Canadiens in December 1970 and led them to a Stanley Cup victory, but in the process alienated many fans when he benched Henri Richard in the Cup finals. A few weeks after winning the 1971 Stanley Cup, MacNeil decided to resign as the head coach and become both the general manager and coach of the Canadiens' main farm team, the Nova Scotia Voyageurs. Bowman was hired the same day that MacNeil resigned and joined the Canadiens as head coach on June 10, 1971. General manager Sam Pollock hired Bowman, in part, because he was fluently bilingual in English and French. His team lost in the first round of the playoffs in 1972 but won the Stanley Cup in 1973. The Canadiens would make the playoffs over the next two seasons but lost in the first round both years, as the Philadelphia Flyers won the Stanley Cup.

From 1976 to 1979, Bowman won four consecutive Stanley Cups with a talented Canadiens squad that included Guy Lafleur, Steve Shutt, Larry Robinson, and Ken Dryden. Bowman's team won at least 45 games in each of his eight seasons. However, after a falling-out with ownership, Bowman stepped down after the 1978–79 season. The reason for the falling-out was the team's decision to pass him over as the new general manager of the club in September 1978, as they hired Irving Grundman, a Pollock protégé, instead. The Canadiens' dynasty ended after Bowman and several key players left the team. Bowman remains second all-time in Canadiens history in both wins and winning percentage, behind Toe Blake in both categories. Not only did Bowman and general manager Sam Pollock preside together over a Canadiens dynasty, but also many of their players went on to have successful coaching and managing roles with their own teams.

=== Buffalo Sabres (1979–1986) ===
For the 1979–80 season, Bowman moved to the Buffalo Sabres as coach and general manager. He served as the team's general manager until 1987, doubling as coach on three occasions. During this time, he missed the playoffs for the only time in his coaching career, in the 1985–86 season. In his first year, he hired former Toronto Maple Leafs head coach Roger Neilson to be his associate coach. For the 1980–81 season, Neilson became the head coach and Bowman focused on being the general manager. A dispute arose on how the team should be coached, forcing Neilson to part ways with the team in June 1981, and Bowman resumed being both coach and general manager.

Bowman joined the Sabres around the same time that their stars were growing old. While the Sabres remained competitive for much of his tenure, he was unable to build them into anything approaching the powerhouses he had coached in Montreal. Bowman resigned during the 1986–87 season and was replaced by Gerry Meehan 12 games into the season. He left the Sabres as coach with the most wins in their history; he has since been passed by Lindy Ruff. He then become the color commentator for the CBC's Hockey Night in Canada usually alongside Don Wittman.

=== Pittsburgh Penguins (1991–1993) ===
He became the director of player personnel of the Pittsburgh Penguins in 1990 and was inducted into the Hockey Hall of Fame in 1991 as a builder.

In the summer, Bob Johnson, who had just won the Stanley Cup with the Penguins, was diagnosed with brain cancer, forcing him to step down before he died on November 26, 1991. Bowman took over as the team's head coach where the Penguins repeated as Stanley Cup champions in a season dedicated to Johnson.

The next season, the Penguins had their first 100-point season in franchise history and finished with the league's best record. The 1992–93 Penguins under Bowman set the NHL record for consecutive wins in the regular season with 17. Their 119 points is still a franchise record. In the playoffs, the Penguins were upset in seven games in the Patrick Division finals by the New York Islanders coached by Al Arbour, a former Bowman player with the Blues.

After his two seasons as head coach in Pittsburgh, he was offered a long-term deal by the club. However, he indicated that he was not interested in their initial offer, which was not disclosed to the public, so they rescinded it. "We have to get somebody who wants to coach this team," Penguins owner Howard Baldwin said. "Scotty was clearly looking elsewhere."

=== Detroit Red Wings (1993–2002) ===
In 1993–94, Bowman became coach of the Detroit Red Wings, and led them to a first-place finish in the Western Conference, but his Red Wings were ousted in the first round by the San Jose Sharks. According to an apocryphal story, Bowman had difficulty in the maze-like tunnels of the San Jose Arena, eventually having to be rescued after getting lost and twice locking himself into rooms.

In 1995, the Red Wings made it to the Stanley Cup Finals, their first finals appearance in 29 years, but were swept by the New Jersey Devils in four straight. In the 1995–96 regular season, he won a record 62 games. However, they lost to the Colorado Avalanche in the Western Conference finals.

In the 1997 playoffs, Bowman led the team to its first Stanley Cup in 42 years by sweeping the Philadelphia Flyers 4–0. The Red Wings repeated the feat the following season (1998) by defeating the Washington Capitals in four games.

In 1999 and 2000, they lost to the Colorado Avalanche in the Western Conference semifinals, and in 2001 they were eliminated by the Los Angeles Kings in the first round.

Bowman decided in February 2002 that he would retire at the end of the season, and he went out as a winner as his Red Wings won the Stanley Cup by defeating the Carolina Hurricanes, four games to one. During the presentation of the Cup on the ice, Bowman put on an old pair of skates so he could take a lap with the Cup. He then publicly announced his retirement from coaching. At the time of his retirement, he was second on the Red Wings' all-time wins list, behind Jack Adams. He is now third, behind Adams and Mike Babcock.

Bowman received the Wayne Gretzky International Award in 2002.

=== Team Canada ===
Bowman has coached the Canada men's national ice hockey team at the international level twice in his career. In the 1976 Canada Cup his team won gold over Czechoslovakia and silver in the 1981 Canada Cup against the Soviet Union.

== Coaching record ==
Team	Year	Regular season							Postseason			
Team	Year	G	W	L	T	OTL	Pts	Finish	W	L	Win %	Result
STL	1967–68	58	23	21	14	—	70	3rd in West	8	10	.444	Lost in Stanley Cup Finals (MTL)
STL	1968–69	76	37	25	14	—	88	1st in West	8	4	.667	Lost in Stanley Cup Finals (MTL)
STL	1969–70	76	37	27	12	—	86	1st in West	8	8	.500	Lost in Stanley Cup Finals (BOS)
STL	1970–71	28	13	10	5	—	(31)	(resigned)	—	—	—	—
STL total		238	110	83	45	—	265		24	22	.522	3 playoff appearances
MTL	1971–72	78	46	16	16	—	108	3rd in East	2	4	.333	Lost in quarterfinals (NYR)
MTL	1972–73	78	52	10	16	—	120	1st in East	12	5	.706	Won Stanley Cup (CHI)
MTL	1973–74	78	45	24	9	—	99	2nd in East	2	4	.333	Lost in quarterfinals (NYR)
MTL	1974–75	80	47	14	19	—	113	1st in Norris	6	5	.545	Lost in semifinals (BUF)
MTL	1975–76	80	58	11	11	—	127	1st in Norris	12	1	.923	Won Stanley Cup (PHI)
MTL	1976–77	80	60	8	12	—	132	1st in Norris	12	2	.857	Won Stanley Cup (BOS)
MTL	1977–78	80	59	10	11	—	129	1st in Norris	12	3	.800	Won Stanley Cup (BOS)
MTL	1978–79	80	52	17	11	—	115	1st in Norris	12	4	.750	Won Stanley Cup (NYR)
MTL total		634	419	110	105	—	943		70	28	.714	8 playoff appearances 5 Stanley Cup titles
BUF	1979–80	80	47	17	16	—	110	1st in Adams	9	5	.643	Lost in semifinals (NYI)
BUF	1981–82	35	18	10	7	—	43	3rd in Adams	1	3	.250	Lost in division semifinals (BOS)
BUF	1982–83	80	38	29	13	—	89	3rd in Adams	6	4	.600	Lost in division finals (BOS)
BUF	1983–84	80	48	25	7	—	103	2nd in Adams	0	3	.000	Lost in division semifinals (QUE)
BUF	1984–85	80	38	28	14	—	90	3rd in Adams	2	3	.400	Lost in division semifinals (QUE)
BUF	1985–86	37	18	18	1	—	37	5th in Adams	—	—	—	Missed playoffs
BUF	1986–87	12	3	7	2	—	8	(fired)	—	—	—	—
BUF total		404	210	134	60	—	480		18	18	.500	5 playoff appearances
PIT	1991–92	80	39	32	9	—	87	3rd in Patrick	16	5	.762	Won Stanley Cup (CHI)
PIT	1992–93	84	56	21	7	—	119	1st in Patrick	7	5	.583	Lost in division finals (NYI)
PIT total		164	95	53	16	—	206		23	10	.697	2 playoff appearances 1 Stanley Cup title
DET	1993–94	84	46	30	8	—	100	1st in Central	3	4	.429	Lost in conference quarterfinals (SJS)
DET	1994–95	48	33	11	4	—	70	1st in Central	12	6	.667	Lost in Stanley Cup Finals (NJD)
DET	1995–96	82	62	13	7	—	131	1st in Central	10	9	.526	Lost in conference finals (COL)
DET	1996–97	82	38	26	18	—	94	2nd in Central	16	4	.800	Won Stanley Cup (PHI)
DET	1997–98	82	44	23	15	—	103	2nd in Central	16	6	.727	Won Stanley Cup (WSH)
DET	1998–99	82	43	32	7	—	93	1st in Central	6	4	.600	Lost in conference semifinals (COL)
DET	1999–2000	82	48	22	10	2	108	2nd in Central	5	4	.556	Lost in conference semifinals (COL)
DET	2000–01	82	49	20	9	4	111	1st in Central	2	4	.333	Lost in conference quarterfinals (LAK)
DET	2001–02	82	51	17	10	4	116	1st in Central	16	7	.696	Won Stanley Cup (CAR)
DET total		701	410	193	88	10	920		86	48	.642	9 playoff appearances 3 Stanley Cup titles
Total		2,141	1,244	573	314	10	2,814		221	126	.637	27 playoff appearances 9 Stanley Cup titles

== Retirement ==
In 2003, Bowman was inducted into Canada's Walk of Fame.

Since his retirement as coach in 2002, Bowman worked as a special consultant to the Red Wings. On August 3, 2007, it was reported that Bowman was offered the position of President of the Toronto Maple Leafs. Bowman later appeared in an interview on Hockey Night in Canada on January 12, 2008, confirming that he was very close to taking the job only to be turned away by Richard Peddie, CEO of Maple Leaf Sports & Entertainment Ltd. (MLSE). In July 2008, he took a position as senior advisor of hockey operations for the Chicago Blackhawks to work alongside his son Stan Bowman, who was the general manager. The Blackhawks' Stanley Cup victory in 2010 gave Bowman his 12th Stanley Cup including coaching and team management, and the Blackhawks' 2013, and 2015 Stanley Cup victories were Bowman's 13th and 14th respectively. On July 1, 2022, he retired from the Chicago Blackhawks, where he had served as senior advisor of hockey operations, saying that "it was time to move on."; his son Stan had served as general manager from 2009 to 2021.

In 2012, he was made an Officer of the Order of Canada "for his contributions to hockey as a coach and mentor".

On February 8, 2017, it was announced that Bowman would receive Order of Hockey in Canada award in a ceremony on June 19.

== Personal life ==
As of 2023, Bowman and his wife Suella lived in Buffalo, New York and Sarasota, Florida, with Bowman attending a majority of the Tampa Bay Lightning home games.

== See also ==
- List of members of the Hockey Hall of Fame
- List of National Hockey League head coaching wins and point percentage leaders

== Notes ==
Awards and achievements
Preceded by Don Cherry; Marc Crawford	Winner of the Jack Adams Award; 1977; 1996	Succeeded by Bobby Kromm; Ted Nolan
Sporting positions
Preceded by Lynn Patrick	General Manager of the St. Louis Blues; 1968–71	Succeeded by Sid Abel
Preceded by Lynn Patrick; Al Arbour	Head coach of the St. Louis Blues; 1967–70; 1971	Succeeded by Al Arbour; Sid Abel
Preceded by Al MacNeil	Head coach of Montreal Canadiens; 1971–1979	Succeeded by Bernie Geoffrion
Preceded by Billy Inglis; Roger Neilson; Jim Roberts; Jim Schoenfeld	Head coach of the Buffalo Sabres; 1979–80; 1981; 1982–85; 1986	Succeeded by Roger Neilson; Jim Roberts; Jim Schoenfeld; Craig Ramsay
Preceded by Bob Johnson	Head coach of the Pittsburgh Penguins; 1991–93	Succeeded by Eddie Johnston
Preceded by Bryan Murray	Head coach of the Detroit Red Wings; 1993–2002	Succeeded by Dave Lewis
Preceded by John Anderson	General Manager of the Buffalo Sabres; 1980–86	Succeeded by Gerry Meehan
Preceded by Bryan Murray	General Manager of the Detroit Red Wings; 1994–97 with Jim Devellano	Succeeded by Ken Holland
