= List of Buffalo Sabres general managers =

The Buffalo Sabres are a professional ice hockey team based in Buffalo, New York, United States. The Sabres are members of the Atlantic Division of the Eastern Conference in the National Hockey League (NHL). Founded as an expansion franchise in 1970, the Sabres have had ten general managers since the team's inception.

== Key ==
Key of terms and definitions
Term	Definition
No.	Number of general managers^{[a]}
Ref(s)	References
–	Does not apply
†	Elected to the Hockey Hall of Fame in the Builder category

== General managers ==
General managers of the Buffalo Sabres
No.	Name	Tenure	Accomplishments during this term	Ref(s)
1	Punch Imlach†	January 16, 1970 – December 4, 1978	1 Stanley Cup Finals appearance (1975); 1 conference title, 1 division title, and 5 playoff appearances	
2	John Anderson	December 4, 1978 – June 11, 1979	1 playoff appearance	
3	Scotty Bowman	June 11, 1979 – December 1, 1986	1 conference title, 2 division titles, and 6 playoff appearances	
4	Gerry Meehan	December 1, 1986 – July 30, 1993	6 playoff appearances	
5	John Muckler	July 30, 1993 – May 14, 1997	1 division title and 3 playoff appearances	
6	Darcy Regier	June 11, 1997 – November 13, 2013^{[b]}	1 Stanley Cup Finals appearance (1999); Won Presidents' Trophy (2006–07); 1 conference title, 2 division titles, and 8 playoff appearances	
7	Tim Murray	January 9, 2014 – April 20, 2017	No playoff appearances	
8	Jason Botterill	May 11, 2017 – June 16, 2020	No playoff appearances	
9	Kevyn Adams	June 16, 2020 – December 15, 2025	No playoff appearances	
10	Jarmo Kekäläinen	December 15, 2025 – present	1 division title and 1 playoff appearance	

== See also ==
- List of NHL general managers

== Notes ==
- ^{a} A running total of the number of general managers of the franchise. Thus any general manager who has two or more separate terms as general manager is only counted once.
- ^{b} During the 2013–14 interim in which there was no general manager, Pat LaFontaine fulfilled the duties of the position under the title of "President of Hockey Operations."
