= Shawville, Quebec =

Shawville
- Municipality
- Shawville main street

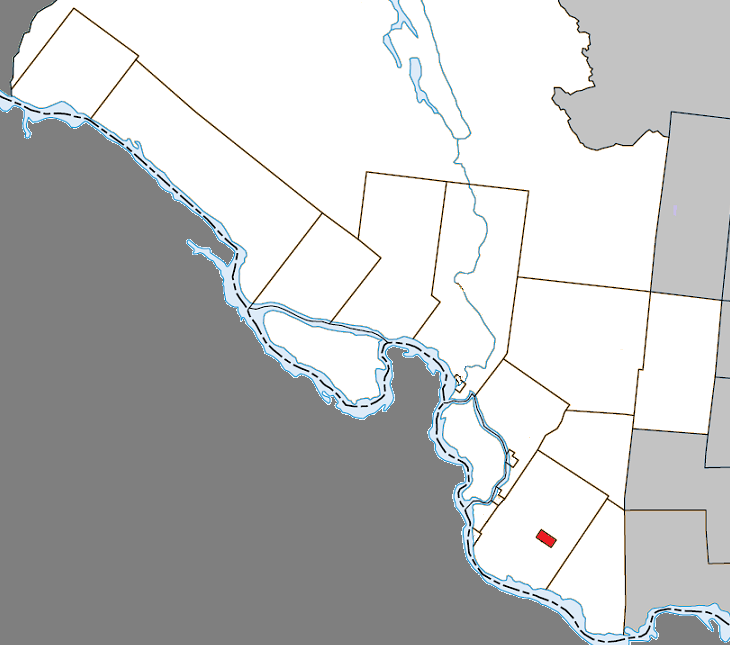
- Location within Pontiac RCM

- Location in western Quebec
- Coordinates: 45°36′N 76°29′W
- Country: Canada
- Province: Quebec
- Region: Outaouais
- RCM: Pontiac
- Constituted: January 1, 1874

Government
  - Mayor: Richard Armitage
  - Federal riding: Pontiac—Kitigan Zibi
  - Prov. riding: Pontiac

Area
  - Total: 5.40 km^{2} (2.08 sq mi)
  - Land: 5.38 km^{2} (2.08 sq mi)

Population (2021)
  - Total: 1,668
  - Density: 310.1/km^{2} (803/sq mi)
  - Pop (2016-21): ▲5.1%
  - Dwellings: 807
- Time zone: UTC−5 (EST)
  - Summer (DST): UTC−4 (EDT)
- Postal code(s): J0X 2Y0
- Area code: 819
- Highways: R-148; R-303
- Website: www.shawville.ca

Shawville is a town located in the Pontiac Regional County Municipality in the administrative region of Outaouais in western Quebec, Canada.

== History ==
At the end of the 1860s, a group of citizens from Clarendon Centre, under the leadership of James Shaw (1818–1877), separated the municipality from the township of Clarendon. While they had originally planned on naming the new entity "Daggville," after the name of a pioneer family, they opted instead to name it "Shawville" after James Shaw promised to donate 0.8 ha (2.0 acres) of land to the new municipality. Shawville was officially established in 1874 and was populated by Irish Protestant immigrants. John Dale Jr, who was mayor of Clarendon at the time, resigned to become the first mayor of the newly formed township of Shawville in 1874.

The municipality has a Methodist church that was built in Shawville in 1835, while the Catholic Parish of Saint-Alexandre-de-Clarendon opened its doors in 1840. This church would later be renamed Sainte-Mélanie and still later as Saint-Jacques-le-Majeur in 1917.

In recent times, Shawville has been the site of several conflicts between local shopkeepers and the Office québécois de la langue française over the province's language laws.

== Geography ==
The town is an enclave within the municipality of Clarendon. Shawville is situated approximately 75 kilometres (47 mi) west of Gatineau and 35 kilometres (22 mi) southeast of Fort-Coulonge.

== Demographics ==
=== Population ===
Canada census – Shawville, Quebec community profile

	2021	2016	2011
Population	1,668 (+5.1% from 2016)	1,587 (-4.6% from 2011)	1,664 (+4.9% from 2006)
Land area	5.38 km^{2} (2.08 sq mi)	5.39 km^{2} (2.08 sq mi)	5.40 km^{2} (2.08 sq mi)
Population density	310.1/km^{2} (803/sq mi)	294.5/km^{2} (763/sq mi)	308.1/km^{2} (798/sq mi)
Median age	53.6 (M: 48.8, F: 56.0)	50.1 (M: 46.6, F: 52.4)	50.8 (M: 48.0, F: 53.2)
Private dwellings	807 (total) 750 (occupied)	735 (total)	775 (total)
Median household income	$55,200	$47,403	$43,575

References: 2021 2016 2011

Historical Census Data - Shawville, Quebec

Year	Pop.	±%
1921	735	—
1931	801	+9.0%
1941	892	+11.4%
1951	1,159	+29.9%
1956	1,281	+10.5%
1961	1,534	+19.8%

Year	Pop.	±%
1966	1,652	+7.7%
1971	1,745	+5.6%
1976	1,724	−1.2%
1981	1,608	−6.7%
1986	1,575	−2.1%
1991	1,591	+1.0%

Year	Pop.	±%
1996	1,632	+2.6%
2001	1,582	−3.1%
2006	1,587	+0.3%
2011	1,664	+4.9%
2016	1,587	−4.6%
2021	1,668	+5.1%

Source: Statistics Canada

=== Language ===
Shawville is a majority anglophone (with over 85 percent of its residents listing English as their first language in the 2021 Canadian census) and Protestant (75%) community. This is unusual in Quebec, a province that is majority French-speaking and Roman Catholic.

Mother tongue language (2021)
Language	Population	Pct (%)
English	1,290	82.7%
French	200	12.8%
English and French	50	3.2%
Other languages	20	1.3%

== Culture ==
The town is characterized by its red-brick buildings. Unlike most municipalities in Quebec, it has no Catholic church. Shawville is home to an elementary school, a high school, a regional hospital, and the Society of Rural Physicians of Canada (SRPC) national head office. Its businesses are mostly small and family-run.

The secondary school (Pontiac High School) is an English-language, secondary school with about 400 students. It is operated by the Western Quebec School Board. Robert Fumerton is a notable alumnus.

The Shawville Fair, held the first weekend in September, is the town's major event. It has run every year since 1856 and includes typical county fair features such as livestock shows, auctions, truck pulls, demolition derbies, art/craft/hobby shows, diverse food stands and a midway. In recent years, it has drawn headline entertainers such as Terri Clark, Stompin' Tom Connors, Paul Brandt, April Wine, Dean Brody and Corb Lund, with total attendance reaching around 50,000. It did not run for the first time in its history in 2020, amid the COVID-19 pandemic.

== Sports ==
Shawville is represented in the Eastern Ontario Junior B Hockey League by the Shawville Pontiacs.

== Local government ==
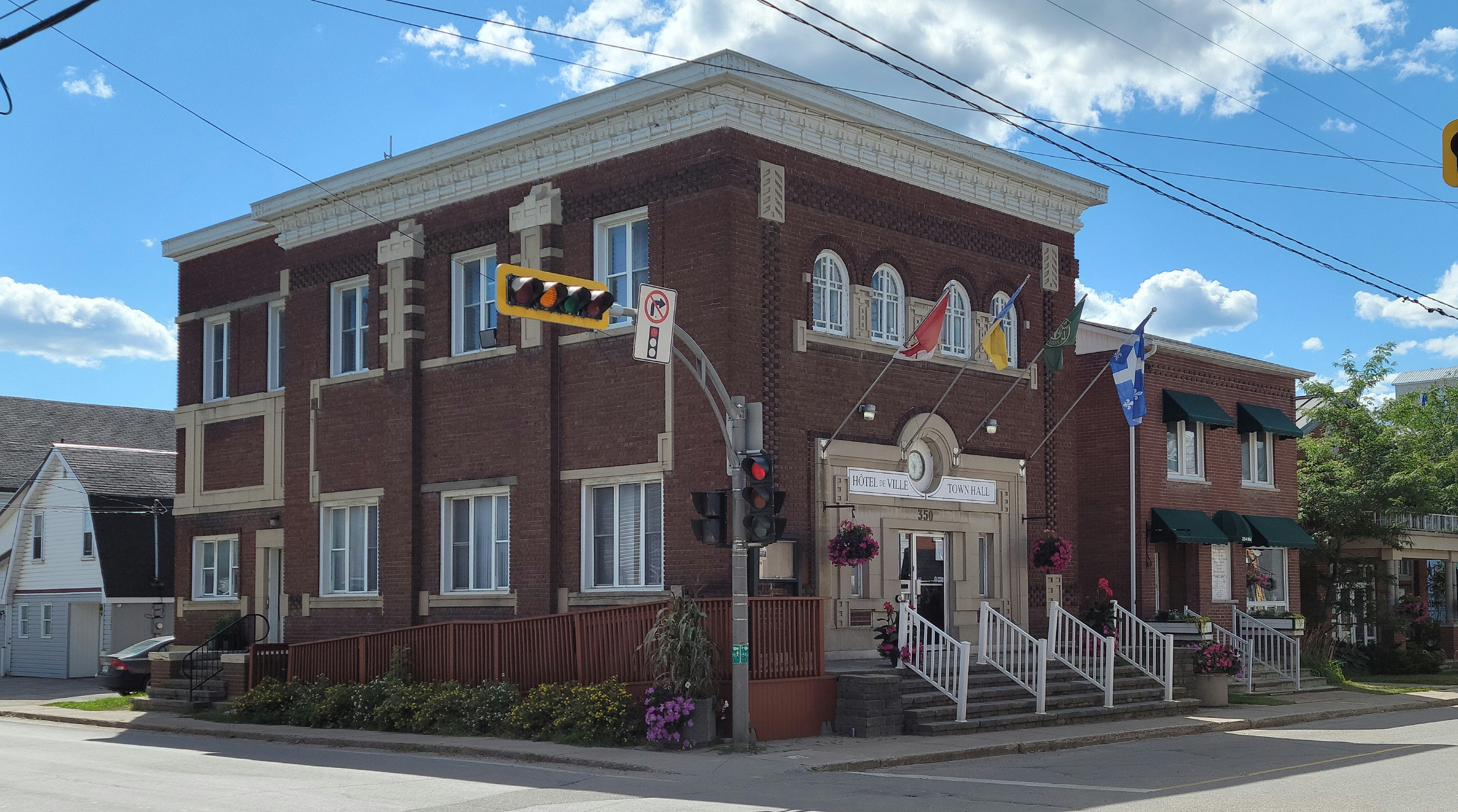
Townhall of Shawville

List of former mayors:

- Albert Armstrong (...–2013)
- Sandra A. Murray (2013–2021)
- Bill McCleary (2021–present)

== Notable people ==
Famous people from Shawville include the former general manager of the Ottawa Senators, Bryan Murray, Terry Murray (current assistant coach of the Buffalo Sabres and former coach of the L.A. Kings), Tim Murray (former general manager of the Buffalo Sabres), and NHL legend Frank "The Shawville Express" Finnigan.

Ray Harris, a prominent singer-songwriter in the Ottawa area, was raised in Shawville and later wrote the song Shawville Girl. Robert Taylor Telford, who founded the Alberta city Leduc in 1891, was born in Shawville in 1860.

== See also ==
- List of anglophone communities in Quebec
- List of municipalities in Quebec
- Pontiac Pacific Junction Railway
