= Ted Nolan =

Canadian Ojibwe ice hockey player

Ted Nolan OC OOnt
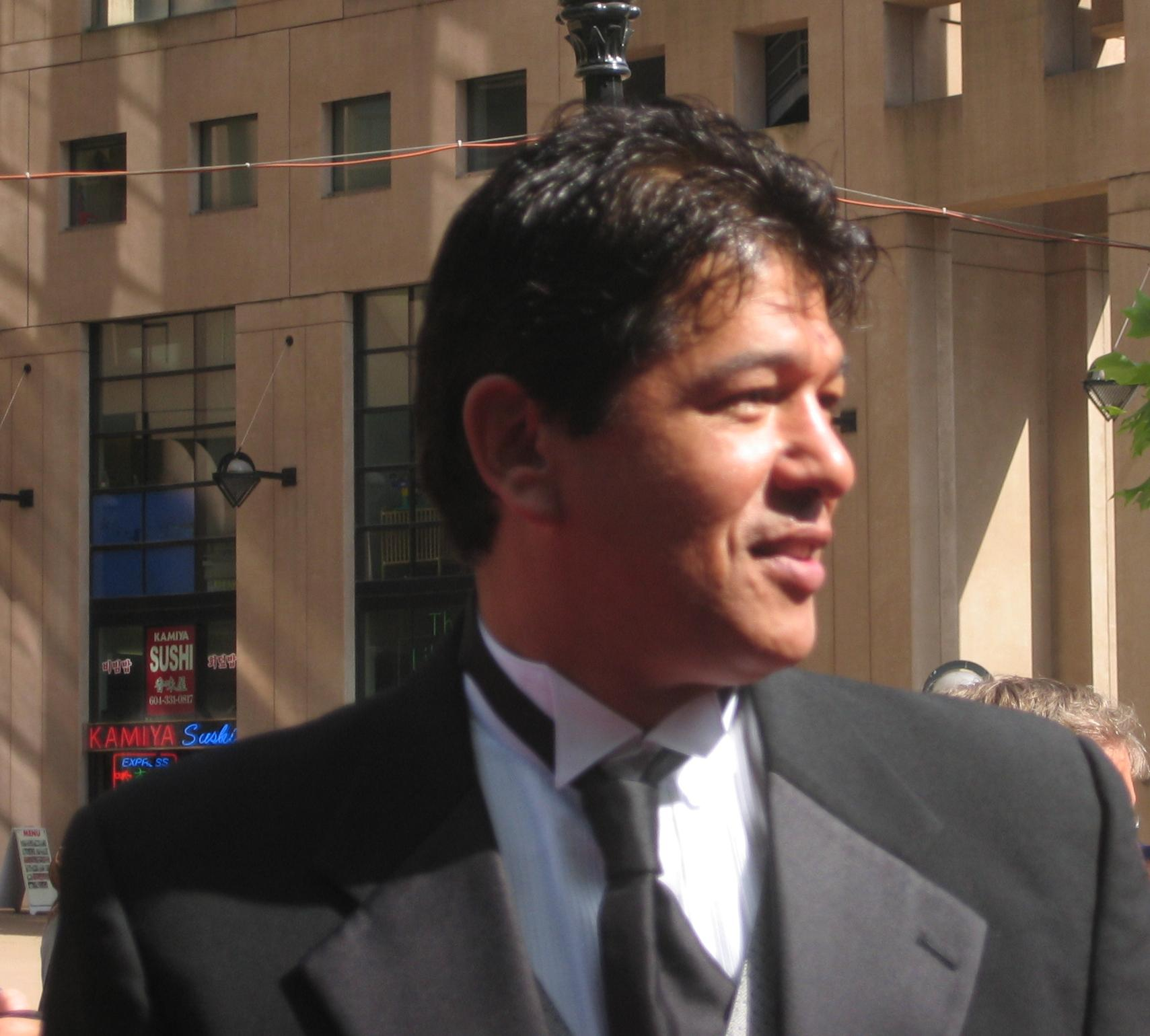
- Ted Nolan at the 2006 NHL awards
- Born: April 7, 1958 (age 68) Garden River First Nation, Ontario, Canada
- Height: 6 ft 0 in (183 cm)
- Weight: 185 lb (84 kg; 13 st 3 lb)
- Position: Left wing
- Shot: Left
- Played for: Detroit Red Wings; Pittsburgh Penguins
- NHL draft: 78th overall, 1978; Detroit Red Wings
- Playing career: 1978–1986

John Theodore Nolan OC OOnt (born April 7, 1958) is an Indigenous Canadian former professional ice hockey player and coach. He played as a left winger in the National Hockey League (NHL) and served as the head coach for the Buffalo Sabres and the Latvia men's national team and Poland men's national team.

He played three seasons in the NHL for the Detroit Red Wings and Pittsburgh Penguins. He also coached the New York Islanders, after serving as assistant coach for one season with the Hartford Whalers. On November 13, 2013, the Buffalo Sabres re-hired Nolan as interim head coach; he remained in the position until April 12, 2015.

== Playing career ==
He played left-wing for the Ontario Hockey Association's Sault Ste. Marie Greyhounds, the Kansas City Red Wings of the Central Hockey League, and the Adirondack Red Wings, Rochester Americans and Baltimore Skipjacks of the American Hockey League. He also played for the Pittsburgh Penguins and the Detroit Red Wings of the National Hockey League from early to mid-1980s.

== Coaching career ==
=== Ontario Hockey League ===
Nolan became head coach of the Sault Ste. Marie Greyhounds in 1988, as a mid-season replacement and coached there until the end of the 1994 season. Nolan led the Greyhounds to the three consecutive Memorial Cup tournament berths, winning the Canadian national junior championship in 1993.

=== Buffalo Sabres (1995–1997) ===
Nolan was hired as an assistant coach by the Hartford Whalers prior to the 1994–95 NHL season. After one season in Hartford, he accepted the position of head coach with the NHL's Buffalo Sabres. In his second season in Buffalo, he led the team to the Northeast Division title and was awarded the Jack Adams Award as the league's top coach.

His relationships with all-star goaltender Dominik Hašek and general manager John Muckler, however, were strained. Hašek, who sided with Muckler, stated in an interview during 1997 NHL Awards Ceremony that "it would be better for me if he (Nolan) did not return." Muckler, who had just been voted the NHL's 1996–97 Executive of the Year, was the first casualty of this toxic situation and was fired prior to the 1997–98 season. New general manager Darcy Regier was given the option of choosing his own coach. Rather than fire Nolan, whose two-year contract had just expired, Regier offered him a one-year extension, reportedly for $500,000. After winning Coach of the Year honors, Nolan found the offer insulting and rejected it. Regier subsequently pulled the contract off the table and hired Lindy Ruff as the Sabres' new head coach.

=== Post-Sabres career ===
Following his departure from Buffalo, Nolan was offered NHL coaching jobs in 1997 by the Tampa Bay Lightning (head coach) and in 1998 by the New York Islanders (assistant coach). Nolan declined both offers. Nolan was not offered an NHL coaching job again until May 2006, a span of eight years, with reports of his role in the firing of Sabres' GM John Muckler being the reason no team would hire him.

On December 16, 2005, Nolan was the victim of racial harassment during a Wildcats road game against the Chicoutimi Saguenéens. Fans in the stands shouted racial slurs at him and directed gestures such as the "tomahawk chop" and shooting a bow and arrow towards him as he stood behind the Moncton bench. The incident, he said later, left him shaking with anger and humiliation. The fans' behavior was condemned both by the QMJHL commissioner and Saguenéens management, the latter of which issued a formal apology to Nolan.

Nolan's Wildcats reached the 2006 Memorial Cup final only to lose to the Quebec Remparts.

=== New York Islanders (2006–2008) ===
On June 8, 2006, New York Islanders' owner Charles Wang dismissed interim coach Brad Shaw and announced the hiring of Nolan as the team's new head coach. New York Post hockey columnist Larry Brooks quickly criticized Wang for hiring Nolan at the same time as new general manager Neil Smith, rather than allowing Smith to hire a coach of his own choosing.

In his first season with the Islanders in 2006–07, he led the team to a 92-point season and its first playoff berth since 2003–04. On April 20, 2007, Nolan's Islanders fell in five games to his former team, the top-seeded Buffalo Sabres.

In his second season, Nolan led the Islanders to a record of 35–38–9 for 79 points, missing one game in order to allow Al Arbour to coach 1500 games. On July 14, 2008, he was fired by then-Islanders' general manager Garth Snow.

=== Rochester Americans (2009–2011) ===
On July 2, 2009, Nolan agreed to a one-year contract with the Rochester Americans to become their Vice President of Hockey Operations. He remained with the team through 2011, when the team was sold to Terrence Pegula.

=== Latvia men's national team (2011–2013) ===
On August 3, 2011, Latvian Ice Hockey Federation announced that Nolan agreed to become the head coach of Latvia men's national ice hockey team. He coached Latvia at the 2012 and 2013 IIHF World Championships, finishing 10th and 11th respectively. In 2013, Latvia qualified for the 2014 Winter Olympics with Nolan behind the bench.

At the Winter Olympics, Latvia finished last in its group during the round robin tournament. They then upset favoured Switzerland in the qualification playoffs 3–1. Advancing to the quarterfinals, Latvia lost a hard-fought match to defending Olympic champions Canada 2–1. It was Latvia's best-ever Olympic result as they finished eighth overall.

=== Return to Buffalo (2013–2015) ===
On November 13, 2013, Nolan returned to the Buffalo Sabres, being named the interim head coach following the firing of both head coach Ron Rolston and general manager Darcy Regier. Nolan was hired by Pat LaFontaine, who had also joined the team as president of hockey operations before resigning three months later.

Despite a relatively poor on-ice record, Tim Murray, Regier's replacement as general manager, expressed interest in keeping Nolan as permanent head coach. Nolan signed a three-year contract extension on March 31, 2014. However, on April 12, 2015, Murray fired Nolan and his assistants, citing a last place finish and a "decent" but not "great" working relationship with Nolan.

=== Poland men's national team (2017–2018) ===
Nolan started coaching the Polish national team in 2017. The team played in the 2018 IIHF World Championship Division I A and were relegated to Division I B. He resigned shortly thereafter.

== Personal life ==
Nolan and his wife have two sons who played in the NHL, Brandon and Jordan.

Nolan is a member of the Ojibwe Nation, a First Nations people. He was raised with 11 siblings in poverty on the Garden River reserve near Sault Ste. Marie, Ontario. The house had no electricity or running water. At age 14 his father, Stan, died of heart failure, and his mother, Rose, was killed by a drunk driver when he was 24.

== Philanthropy ==
The Ted Nolan Foundation was established by Nolan in 2004. The foundation is dedicated to supporting the educational and athletic aspirations of female First Nations students through the Rose Nolan Memorial Scholarship. Named in honour of his mother, the scholarship provides $5,000 annually to recipients who demonstrate academic achievement, athletic involvement, and strong community engagement.

3|NOLANS First Nation Hockey School was founded in 2013 by Nolan, alongside his sons. This initiative offers a five-day ice hockey skills camp aimed at boys and girls aged 7 to 15. The program focuses on enhancing hockey abilities among First Nations youth and emphasizes the importance of active, healthy living. Beyond sports skills, the camp encourages participants to become positive role models in their communities.

== Awards and honours ==
Nolan was chosen as a role model in the national Native alcohol drug and abuse program in 1986. Nolan was also chosen for the Kiwanis Citizen of the year in 1991, and is an active member of the Aboriginal community.

- Jack Adams Award winner – 1996–97
- National Aboriginal Achievement Award – 1994
- Officer of the Order of Canada, 2025.

== Career statistics ==
=== Regular season and playoffs ===
			Regular season					Playoffs
Season	Team	League	GP	G	A	Pts	PIM	GP	G	A	Pts	PIM
1975–76	Kenora Thistles	MJHL	51	24	32	56	86	—	—	—	—	—
1976–77	Sault Ste. Marie Greyhounds	OMJHL	60	8	16	24	109	—	—	—	—	—
1977–78	Sault Ste. Marie Greyhounds	OMJHL	66	14	30	44	106	—	—	—	—	—
1978–79	Kansas City Red Wings	CHL	73	12	38	50	66	4	1	2	3	0
1979–80	Adirondack Red Wings	AHL	75	16	24	40	106	5	0	1	1	0
1980–81	Adirondack Red Wings	AHL	76	22	28	50	86	18	6	10	16	11
1981–82	Adirondack Red Wings	AHL	39	12	18	30	81	—	—	—	—	—
1981–82	Detroit Red Wings	NHL	41	4	13	17	45	—	—	—	—	—
1982–83	Adirondack Red Wings	AHL	78	24	40	64	106	6	2	5	7	14
1983–84	Adirondack Red Wings	AHL	31	10	16	26	76	7	2	3	5	18
1983–84	Detroit Red Wings	NHL	19	1	2	3	26	—	—	—	—	—
1984–85	Rochester Americans	AHL	65	28	34	62	152	5	4	0	4	18
1985–86	Baltimore Skipjacks	AHL	10	4	4	8	19	—	—	—	—	—
1985–86	Pittsburgh Penguins	NHL	18	1	1	2	34	—	—	—	—	—
NHL Totals			78	6	16	22	105	—	—	—	—	—
AHL Totals			374	116	164	280	626	41	14	19	33	61

== Head coaching record ==
=== NHL ===
Year	Team	Regular season						Postseason			
Year	Team	G	W	L	OTL	Pts	Finish	W	L	Win %	Result
1995–96	BUF	82	33	42	7	72	5th in Northeast	—	—	—	Missed playoffs
1996–97	BUF	82	40	30	12	92	1st in Northeast	5	7	.417	Lost in conference semifinals (PHI)
2006–07	NYI	82	40	30	12	92	4th in Atlantic	1	4	.200	Lost in conference quarterfinals (BUF)
2007–08	NYI	81	34	38	9	79	5th in Atlantic	—	—	—	Missed playoffs
2013–14	BUF	62	17	36	9	43	8th in Atlantic	—	—	—	Missed playoffs
2014–15	BUF	82	23	51	8	54	8th in Atlantic	—	—	—	Missed playoffs
NHL total		472	188	227	57			6	11	.353	2 playoff appearances

=== Junior ===
Year	Team	Regular season						Postseason			
Year	Team	G	W	L	OTL	Pts	Finish	W	L	Win %	Result
1989–90	SOO	66	18	42	6	42	7th in Emms	—	—	—	Missed playoffs
1990–91	SOO	66	42	21	3	87	1st in Emms	12	2	.857	Won J. Ross Robertson Cup (OSH)
1991–92	SOO	66	41	19	6	88	1st in Emms	12	7	.632	Won J. Ross Robertson Cup (NBC)
1992–93	SOO	66	38	23	5	81	1st in Emms	9	5	.643	Won the Memorial Cup (PET)
1993–94	SOO	66	35	24	7	71	2nd in Emms	10	4	.714	Lost in semifinals (DET)
2005–06	MON	70	52	15	3	107	1st in Eastern	16	5	.762	Won President's Cup (QUE)

== See also ==
- Notable Aboriginal people of Canada

Preceded by John Muckler	Head coach of the Buffalo Sabres; 1995–97	Succeeded by Lindy Ruff
Preceded by Scotty Bowman	Winner of the Jack Adams Award; 1997	Succeeded by Pat Burns
Preceded by Brad Shaw	Head coach of the New York Islanders; 2006–08	Succeeded by Scott Gordon
Preceded by Ron Rolston	Head coach of the Buffalo Sabres; 2013–15	Succeeded by Dan Bylsma
