= Society of Rural Physicians of Canada =

Canadian health organization

The Society of Rural Physicians of Canada (commonly referred to by its acronym SRPC) was founded in 1992 by a group of physicians in Mount Forest, Ontario. The SRPC National Head office is located in Shawville, Quebec

== Awards ==
- The Keith Award - Awarded to a deserving medical school
- The Rural Service Award - Awarded to doctors who have served their rural communities for 10 or more years.
