= Mathieu Darche =

Canadian ice hockey player

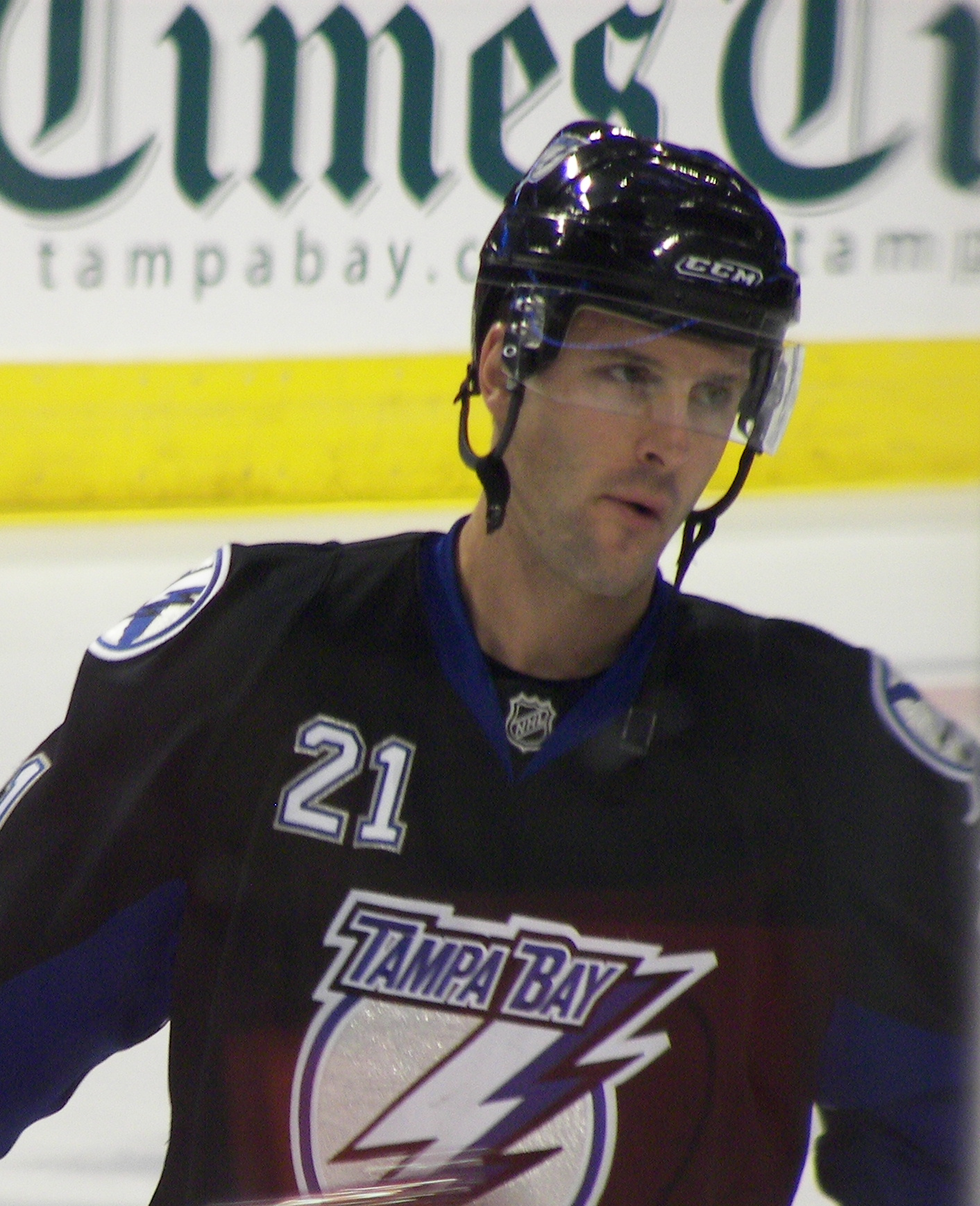
- Darche with the Tampa Bay Lightning in 2007
- Born: November 26, 1976 (age 49) Saint-Laurent, Quebec, Canada
- Height: 6 ft 1 in (185 cm)
- Weight: 217 lb (98 kg; 15 st 7 lb)
- Position: Left wing
- Shot: Left
- Played for: Columbus Blue Jackets; Nashville Predators; San Jose Sharks; Tampa Bay Lightning; Montreal Canadiens
- NHL draft: Undrafted
- Playing career: 2000–2012

Mathieu Darche (born November 26, 1976) is a Canadian professional ice hockey executive and former player who is the general manager for the New York Islanders of the National Hockey League (NHL). He played for several American Hockey League (AHL) and NHL clubs from 2000 to 2012. Mathieu is the younger brother of football player J. P. Darche.

== Hockey career ==
=== Amateur ===
Darche played hockey at Choate Rosemary Hall and graduated in 1996. He has a commerce degree in marketing and international business from McGill University. While attending university, Darche played four seasons of Canadian Interuniversity Sport (CIS) hockey, where in his last year, he was named the CIS Outstanding student-athlete and was awarded the Dr. Randy Gregg Award.

=== Professional ===
After McGill, Darche became the first-ever signing by the expansion Columbus Blue Jackets in 2000.

During the 2004–05 NHL lockout, Darche spent a full season with the Hershey Bears of the AHL.

He played for the Füchse Duisburg of the Deutsche Eishockey Liga (DEL) in 2005–06 and also split four seasons between the NHL and AHL with the Columbus Blue Jackets, Nashville Predators, and their affiliates. In 2006–07, he played a few games with the San Jose Sharks of the NHL but spent most of the season playing for the team's AHL affiliate, the Worcester Sharks. In 2007–08, Darche played with the Tampa Bay Lightning.

After starting the 2009–10 season playing for its AHL affiliate, the Hamilton Bulldogs he was recalled and played his first game as a Canadien on January 20, 2010, versus the St. Louis Blues and scored his first goal for the team on January 22 versus the New Jersey Devils, which was a game-winning goal. After attending the New Jersey Devils training camp in January 2013, he was asked to stay with the team but ultimately chose to retire.

Darche also contributed a banana and chocolate bread recipe to the Ricardo Cuisine website as part of a feature highlighting recipes associated with Montreal Canadiens players.

=== Managerial ===
Darche served as Vice-President of Sales and Marketing in Canada for Delmar International Inc. before becoming the Director of Hockey Operations for the Tampa Bay Lightning on May 6, 2019. He would win two Stanley Cups in the role in 2020 and 2021.

Darche was hired as the general manager of the New York Islanders on May 23, 2025.

== Career statistics ==
			Regular season					Playoffs
Season	Team	League	GP	G	A	Pts	PIM	GP	G	A	Pts	PIM
1996–97	McGill University	CIAU	15	0	1	1	21	—	—	—	—	—
1997–98	McGill University	CIAU	26	21	13	34	20	—	—	—	—	—
1998–99	McGill University	CIAU	23	12	21	33	38	—	—	—	—	—
1999–00	McGill University	CIAU	26	27	35	62	22	—	—	—	—	—
2000–01	Syracuse Crunch	AHL	66	16	24	40	21	5	0	1	1	4
2000–01	Columbus Blue Jackets	NHL	9	0	0	0	0	—	—	—	—	—
2001–02	Columbus Blue Jackets	NHL	14	1	1	2	6	—	—	—	—	—
2001–02	Syracuse Crunch	AHL	63	22	23	45	26	10	2	5	7	2
2002–03	Syracuse Crunch	AHL	76	32	32	64	38	—	—	—	—	—
2002–03	Columbus Blue Jackets	NHL	1	0	0	0	0	—	—	—	—	—
2003–04	Milwaukee Admirals	AHL	76	28	31	59	41	22	6	8	14	8
2003–04	Nashville Predators	NHL	2	0	0	0	0	—	—	—	—	—
2004–05	Hershey Bears	AHL	79	29	25	54	49	—	—	—	—	—
2005–06	Füchse Duisburg	DEL	52	12	13	25	88	—	—	—	—	—
2006–07	Worcester Sharks	AHL	76	35	45	80	72	5	2	2	4	2
2006–07	San Jose Sharks	NHL	2	0	0	0	0	—	—	—	—	—
2007–08	Tampa Bay Lightning	NHL	73	7	15	22	20	—	—	—	—	—
2007–08	Norfolk Admirals	AHL	4	3	7	10	2	—	—	—	—	—
2008–09	Portland Pirates	AHL	80	31	35	66	37	5	0	0	0	4
2009–10	Hamilton Bulldogs	AHL	32	16	9	25	4	—	—	—	—	—
2009–10	Montreal Canadiens	NHL	29	5	5	10	4	11	0	1	1	2
2010–11	Montreal Canadiens	NHL	59	12	14	26	10	7	1	1	2	0
2011–12	Montreal Canadiens	NHL	61	5	7	12	18	—	—	—	—	—
AHL totals			552	212	231	443	290	47	10	16	26	20
NHL totals			250	30	42	72	58	18	1	2	3	2

Sporting positions
Preceded by Lou Lamoriello	General manager of the New York Islanders; 2025–present	Incumbent
