= Robert Fumerton =

Canadian Air Force pilot (1913–2006)

Robert Carl Fumerton DFC* AFC
- Born: March 21, 1913; Fort-Coulonge, Quebec
- Died: 10 July 2006 (aged 93)
- Military career
- Allegiance: Canada
- Branch: Royal Canadian Air Force
- Service years: 1940 – 1946
- Rank: Wing Commander
- Nickname: 'Moose'
- Service number: C1352
- Conflicts: World War II
- Awards: Distinguished Flying Cross & Bar; Air Force Cross

Wing Commander Robert Carl 'Moose' Fumerton DFC* AFC (21 March 1913 – 10 July 2006) was the top scoring Canadian night-fighter flying ace during World War II.

== Early life ==
Robert Fumerton was born on 20 March 1913 in Fort-Coulonge in Quebec, Canada. The son of a storekeeper, he attended Shawville High School (now Pontiac High School) in Shawville, Quebec. Initially employed as a timber worker, he contracted diphtheria. He then spent seven years in the North-West Territories and the Yukon surveying, mapping, and gold prospecting.

== Service career ==
In 1938 he obtained a pilot's licence and when war broke out he volunteered to be a pilot with the Royal Canadian Air Force (RCAF). Fumerton graduated as a pilot in July 1940 and arrived in England in August 1940 with No. 112 Squadron, flying the Westland Lysander. Fighter Command was so short of fighter pilots that he joined No. 32 Squadron, flying Hawker Hurricane fighters.

After the battle ended Fumerton moved to No. 1 Squadron. In June 1941 he transferred to night fighting duties and joined the newly formed No 406 (RCAF) Squadron, based in Northumberland.

He then joined No. 89 Squadron in October 1941, flying night operations over Egypt and later Malta in June 1942. With his observer Sgt. Pat Bing, Fumerton became the island's top-scoring night fighter pilot, claiming nine victories by the end of August 1941.

His first success over Malta came on the night of 24 June, an Italian bomber, before returning to refuel and rearm. Just before dawn he destroyed another bomber. Four nights later he accounted for two Junkers Ju 88s. On July 1 he downed a Ju 88, and the following night he shot down another near Gozo. On July 28 he shot down another Ju 88.

On the night of 10 August, when taking off to attack a force of incoming bombers both his engines failed. He and Bing were forced to bail out over the sea, spending several hours in their dinghies before being rescued next morning by an air-sea rescue launch.

On 27 March 1942, Fumerton's award of the Distinguished Flying Cross was announced. The citation, published in The London Gazette, read:

One night in March, 1942, this officer engaged a Heinkel in during an enemy air raid over the Suez Canal zone. Observing the enemy aircraft in the moonlight, Flying Officer Fumerton delivered a good burst and, although he was wounded and his aircraft damaged by the enemy's return fire, he continued the attack and set the bomber on fire. Although the undercarriage of his aircraft had been put out of action Flying Officer Fumerton made a safe landing The raiding aircraft descended on to the sea, its crew being captured.

— London Gazette, No. 35502, 27 March 1942.

Fumerton was awarded a Bar to his DFC in July. the published citation read:

Flying Officer Fumerton is a most tenacious and skilful pilot. One night in June, 1942, he destroyed 2 enemy bombers during one flight and repeated this achievement a few nights later. His determination to destroy the enemy at all costs is outstanding. Since the beginning of June, 1942, 7 enemy aircraft have been destroyed at night by Flying Officer Fumerton.

— London Gazette, No. 35638, 21 July 1942.

He spent the first six months of 1943 in Canada, before returning to No. 406 Squadron RAF in August 1943. He returned, tour-expired, to Canada on 11 August 1944.

Fumerton ended the war credited with the destruction of 14 aircraft, the highest tally among RCAF night fighter aces.

== Later career ==
In the 1946 New Year Honours, he was awarded an Air Force Cross for service as Commanding Officer of No. 7 OTU (Operational Training Unit) at Debert, Nova Scotia. He left the RCAF in 1946, and Fumerton returned to mining. In 1948 he went to Hangkow to train Chinese pilots and organise the formation of squadrons for General Chiang Kai-shek's Chinese Nationalist Air Force. He returned to Canada a year later and became an estate agent. He died on 10 July 2006 at an aged care facility in Huntsville, Ontario. He was survived by five children; his wife, who he had married in 1946, had predeceased him by two years.
