= John Muckler =

Canadian ice hockey coach (1934–2021)

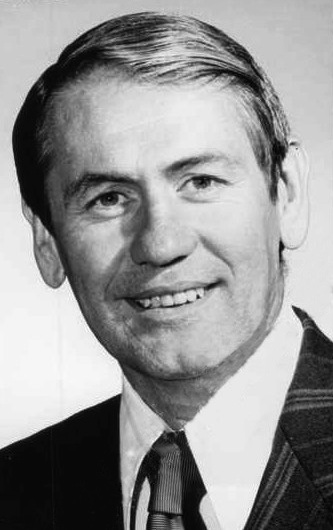
- Muckler in 1971
- Born: April 13, 1934 Midland, Ontario, Canada
- Died: January 4, 2021 (aged 86) Buffalo, New York, U.S.
- Coached for: Minnesota North Stars; Edmonton Oilers; Buffalo Sabres; New York Rangers; Ottawa Senators; Phoenix Coyotes
- Playing career: 1949–1963
- Coaching career: 1962–2000

John Muckler (April 13, 1934 – January 4, 2021) was a Canadian professional hockey coach and executive, who last served as the general manager of the Ottawa Senators of the National Hockey League (NHL). Muckler had over 50 years of professional hockey experience as a part owner, general manager, director of player personnel, director of hockey operations, head coach, assistant coach, and player. He had been a part of five Stanley Cup championships in various roles with the Edmonton Oilers.

== Biography ==
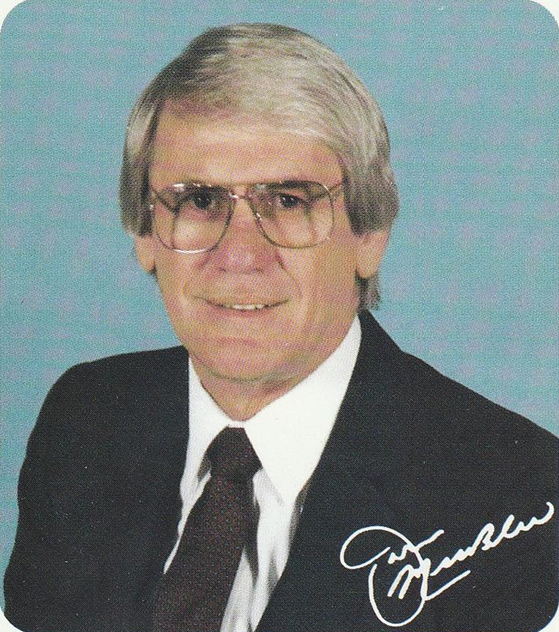
1985 card of Muckler for coaching staff of Edmonton Oilers

Born in Midland, Ontario in 1934, and raised in Paris, Ontario, Muckler was a defenceman in the minor leagues for 13 seasons, playing the bulk of his career in the Eastern Hockey League (EHL). At the age of 27, he elected to quit playing to become coach and GM of the Long Island Ducks of the Eastern Hockey League. It was there that he gained the attention of Emile Francis, the GM of the New York Rangers that hired Muckler to be a talent evaluator.

He then spent the next 20 years in off-ice positions with the New York Rangers, Minnesota North Stars, and Vancouver Canucks before joining the Edmonton Oilers organization in 1981. During those 20 years, Muckler served briefly as head coach of the North Stars in the 1968–69 season; lacking experience in the position to be a head coach, he coached 35 games and was not retained. In the minor leagues, he won multiple regular-season titles, playoff championships, and league coach-of-the-year honours. For his successes, The Sporting News named him the top coach in minor-league hockey in 1979.

While with the Oilers, Muckler served as an assistant coach with the Stanley Cup winners under head coach/general manager Glen Sather in 1984 and 1985. After the 1984-85 season, Sather began splitting most coaching duties with Muckler, who was named assistant head coach. He won two more Cups in 1987 and 1988. When Sather relinquished his coaching duties in 1989, Muckler was promoted to head coach and led the club to its fifth Stanley Cup in seven years in 1990. In the early part of the 1985-86 season, Muckler made comments about Don Cherry that reminded reporters about Cherry committing a huge blunder as a head coach in the 1979 playoffs. Not long afterwards, on Hockey Night in Canada, Cherry derisively asked who Muckler was. Muckler later stated he made the comments to try and rile up his old minor league rival, and the outburst by Cherry pleased him.

In 1991, Muckler left the Oilers organization and was hired by the Buffalo Sabres as the director of hockey operations. In December 1991, he became interim head coach with the firing of Rick Dudley. Muckler guided the Sabres for the next four seasons. He also assumed the role of Sabres' general manager in 1993. Muckler finished as a finalist for the Jack Adams Award as NHL coach of the year in 1994. In March 1995, he served a three-game suspension for slapping a heckling fan. Muckler stepped down from coaching in 1995 to focus on his front-office duties. He was named "NHL Executive of the Year" by The Sporting News for the 1996–97 season. Amidst bickering with head coach Ted Nolan, team president Larry Quinn fired Muckler in the 1997 offseason. John Tortorella, who worked with Muckler in Buffalo, later cited him as a key mentor.

Muckler's last coaching position was as head coach of the New York Rangers from 1998 to 2000. His career coaching record is 276–288–84, combined with a 233–167–53–7 career record as an NHL general manager, and he has been involved in more than 2,000 professional games in varying roles. His résumé also includes three appearances at the National Hockey League All-Star Game and two appearances (1984 and 1987) on the coaching staff of the Canada Cup-winning Team Canada.

Muckler was hired by the Ottawa Senators as general manager in June 2002 by owner Eugene Melnyk and presided over what was arguably the team's most successful period. It was Muckler who elected to fire head coach Jacques Martin and replace him with Bryan Murray. Among the trades made in his tenure included Marián Hossa for Dany Heatley and luring 40-year old Dominik Hašek to a one-year deal while letting players such as Zdeno Chára leave in free agency. The team ultimately reached the Stanley Cup finals in 2007 but lost to the Anaheim Ducks in a five-game series. Despite this success and having one year left on his contract, the Senators announced that Muckler had been fired on June 18, 2007. Murray was promoted to replace him.

Muckler was hired as a senior advisor with the NHL's Phoenix Coyotes in September 2008.

In addition to his many years coaching and managing in the NHL, Muckler was also an assistant coach for the Canadian teams that won the 1984 and 1987 Canadian Cup tournaments. In totality, Muckler spent over 2,000 games as a coach or in management for six different teams.

== Death ==
Muckler died in Buffalo on January 4, 2021.

Muckler was survived by his wife, Audrey until her death on February 9, 2024 and both are now survived by four children and nine grandchildren.

== Career statistics ==
=== Playing statistics ===
			Regular season					Playoffs
Season	Team	League	GP	G	A	Pts	PIM	GP	G	A	Pts	PIM
1949–50	Detroit Hettche	IHL	32	3	4	7	24	3	0	0	0	6
1950–51	Detroit Hettche	IHL	14	0	0	0	28	--	--	--	--	--
1951–52	Windsor Spitfires	OHA	48	2	3	5	0
1952–53	Galt Black Hawks	OHA	54	6	16	22	0
1953–54	Galt Black Hawks	OHA	statistics unavailable
1954–55	Chatham Maroons	OHASr	7	0	1	1	0
1955–56	Vancouver Canucks	WHL	1	0	0	0	0	--	--	--	--	--
1955–56	Baltimore Clippers/Charlotte Rebels	EHL	62	11	34	45	82	--	--	--	--	--
1956–57	Charlotte Checkers	EHL	62	7	45	52	126	13	1	3	4	8
1957–58	Charlotte Clippers	EHL	61	9	35	44	51	14	1	3	4	10
1958–59	Charlotte Clippers	EHL	64	9	23	32	64	--	--	--	--	--
1959–60	New York Rovers	EHL	64	8	25	33	105	--	--	--	--	--
1960–61	New York Rovers	EHL	64	7	23	30	128	--	--	--	--	--
1961–62	Long Island Ducks	EHL	68	10	26	36	99
1962–63	Long Island Ducks	EHL	50	3	21	24	93

=== NHL coaching statistics ===
Team	Year	Regular season							Postseason			
Team	Year	G	W	L	T	OTL	Pts	Finish	W	L	Win %	Result
MNS	1968–69	35	6	23	6	-	(51)	(interim)	–	–	–	Missed playoffs
EDM	1989–90	80	38	28	14	-	90	2nd in Smythe	16	6	.727	Won Stanley Cup (BOS)
EDM	1990–91	80	37	37	6	-	80	3rd in Smythe	9	9	.500	Lost in Conference Final (MNS)
BUF	1991–92	52	22	22	8	-	(74)	3rd in Adams	3	4	.429	Lost in first round (BOS)
BUF	1992–93	84	38	36	10	-	86	4th in Adams	4	4	.500	Lost in second round (MTL)
BUF	1993–94	84	43	32	9	-	95	4th in Northeast	3	4	.429	Lost in first round (NJD)
BUF	1994–95	48	22	19	7	-	51	4th in Northeast	1	4	.200	Lost in first round (PHI)
NYR	1997–98	25	8	15	2	-	(68)	5th in Atlantic	–	–	–	Missed playoffs
NYR	1998–99	82	33	38	11	-	77	4th in Atlantic	–	–	–	Missed playoffs
NYR	1999–2000	78	29	35	11	3	77	(fired)	–	–	–	–
Total		648	276	285	84	3			11	16	.407	6 playoff appearances 1 Stanley Cup title

Preceded by Wren Blair	Head coach of the Minnesota North Stars; 1968	Succeeded by Wren Blair
Preceded by Glen Sather	Head coach of the Edmonton Oilers; 1989–91	Succeeded by Ted Green
Preceded by Rick Dudley	Head coach of the Buffalo Sabres; 1991–95	Succeeded by Ted Nolan
Preceded by Colin Campbell	Head coach of the New York Rangers; 1997–2000	Succeeded by Ron Low
Preceded by Marshall Johnston	General Manager of the Ottawa Senators; 2002–2007	Succeeded by Bryan Murray
Preceded by Gerry Meehan	General Manager of the Buffalo Sabres; 1993–97	Succeeded by Darcy Regier
