= Tyler Metcalfe =

Canadian-born Hungarian ice hockey player

- Born: June 12, 1984 (age 41) Headingley, Manitoba, Canada
- Height: 6 ft 0 in (183 cm)
- Weight: 194 lb (88 kg; 13 st 12 lb)
- Position: Left wing / Defenceman
- Shoots: Left
- MOL team: Miskolci JJSE
- National team: Hungary
- NHL draft: Undrafted
- Playing career: 2010–present

Tyler Metcalfe (born June 12, 1984) is a Canadian-born Hungarian ice hockey player. He is currently playing with Alba Volán Székesfehérvár in the Austrian Hockey League.

== Amateur career ==
Metcalfe played major junior hockey with the Seattle Thunderbirds of the Western Hockey League (WHL) before attending the University of Alberta where he played five seasons (2005 – 2010) with the Alberta Golden Bears in the CWUAA conference of Canadian Interuniversity Sport (CIS). In his final year, Metcalfe was presented with the Dr. Randy Gregg Award in recognition for his outstanding achievement in ice hockey, academics, and community involvement.

== Awards and honours ==
Award	Year
Dr. Randy Gregg Award - CIS excellence in the student-athlete	2009-10
