= Dr. Randy Gregg Award =

Canadian university hockey award

The Dr. Randy Gregg Award is presented annually by U Sports to reward excellence in the student-athlete. The Canadian university ice hockey player who receives this award has exhibited outstanding achievement in ice hockey, academics, and community involvement.

The award is named in honour of Randy Gregg, a CIAU University Cup champion with the Alberta Golden Bears while studying to earn his medical degree, a Canadian Olympian, a professional who won five Stanley Cups with the Edmonton Oilers during his 10 seasons in the National Hockey League, and became a family physician after he retired from hockey.

== Winners ==
- 1990–91: Derrick Pringle - Dalhousie University
- 1991–92: Doug Cherepacha - University of Toronto
- 1992–93: Chris Glover - Queen's University at Kingston
- 1993–94: Craig Donaldson - University of Western Ontario
- 1994–95: Dana McKechnie - University of Lethbridge
- 1995–96: Andy Clark - Mount Allison University
- 1996–97: Mike Chambers - University of Waterloo
- 1997–98: Cam Danyluk - University of Alberta
- 1998–99: Brad Peddle - St. Francis Xavier University
- 1999–00: Mathieu Darche - McGill University
- 2000–01: Mike Williams - York University
- 2001–02: Steven Gallace - Saint Mary's University
- 2002–03: Blair St. Martin - University of Alberta
- 2003–04: Jeff Zorn - University of Alberta
- 2004–05: Gavin McLeod - University of Alberta
- 2005–06: David Chant - Saint Mary's University
- 2006–07: Colin Sinclair - University of New Brunswick
- 2007–08: Curtis Austring - University of Saskatchewan
- 2008–09: Andrew Brown - Lakehead University
- 2009–10: Tyler Metcalfe - University of Alberta
- 2010–11: Eric Hunter - University of Alberta
- 2011–12: Kyle Bailey - University of New Brunswick
- 2012–13: Jordan Knox - University of Prince Edward Island
- 2013–14: Ben Lindemulder - University of Alberta
- 2014–15: Olivier Hinse - Concordia University
- 2015–16: Nathan Chiarlitti - St. Francis Xavier University
- 2016–17: Aaron Armstrong Ryerson University
- 2017–18: Kendall McFaull - University of Saskatchewan
- 2018–19: Randy Gazzola - University of New Brunswick
- 2019–20: Liam Maaskant - Acadia University
- 2020–21: Not Awarded - (COVID‑19 Season)
- 2021–22: Kyle Bollers - Toronto Metropolitan University
- 2022–23: Matthew Welsh - Saint Mary's University
- 2023–24: Alexandre Gagnon - McGill University
- 2024–25: Cole MacKay - University of New Brunswick
- 2025–26: Blake Gustafson - University of Alberta
