= List of New York Islanders general managers =

The New York Islanders are a professional ice hockey team based in Elmont, NY. They are members of the Metropolitan Division of the National Hockey League's (NHL) Eastern Conference. The Islanders franchise has been a part of the NHL since their inception in 1972, playing their home games at Nassau Veterans Memorial Coliseum from 1972-2015 and 2018–21, Barclays Center from 2015–20 and have played at UBS Arena since 2021. The team has had seven general managers since their inception in 1972.

== Key ==
Key of terms and definitions
| Term | Definition |
|---|---|
| No. | Number of general managers^{[a]} |
| Ref(s) | References |
| – | Does not apply |
| † | Elected to the Hockey Hall of Fame in the Builder category |

== General managers ==
General managers of the New York Islanders
| No. | Name | Tenure | Accomplishments during this term | Ref(s) |
|---|---|---|---|---|
| 1 | Bill Torrey† | February 15, 1972 – August 17, 1992 | Won Stanley Cup four times in five finals appearances (1980, 1981, 1982, 1983, 1984); 6 conference titles, 6 division titles, and 15 playoff appearances | |
| 2 | Don Maloney | August 17, 1992 – December 2, 1995 | 2 playoff appearances | |
| – | Darcy Regier (Interim) | December 2, 1995 – December 12, 1995 | | |
| 3 | Mike Milbury | December 12, 1995 – June 8, 2006 | 3 playoff appearances | |
| 4 | Neil Smith | June 8, 2006 – July 18, 2006 | | |
| 5 | Garth Snow | July 18, 2006 – June 5, 2018 | 4 playoff appearances | |
| 6 | Lou Lamoriello† | June 5, 2018 – April 22, 2025 | 5 playoff appearances | |
| 7 | Mathieu Darche | May 23, 2025 – present | | |

== See also ==
- List of NHL general managers

== Notes ==
- ^{a} A running total of the number of general managers of the franchise. Thus any general manager who has two or more separate terms as general manager is only counted once. Interim general managers do not count towards the total.
