= Gerry Meehan =

Canadian ice hockey player and executive (1946–2026)

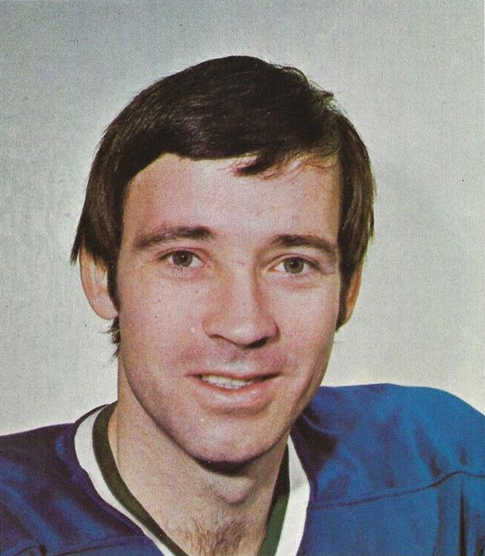
- Meehan in 1975 photo
- Born: September 3, 1946 Toronto, Ontario, Canada
- Died: June 5, 2026 (aged 79) Clarence, New York, U.S.
- Height: 6 ft 2 in (188 cm)
- Weight: 200 lb (91 kg; 14 st 4 lb)
- Position: Left wing
- Shot: Left
- Played for: Toronto Maple Leafs; Philadelphia Flyers; Buffalo Sabres; Vancouver Canucks; Atlanta Flames; Washington Capitals; Cincinnati Stingers
- NHL draft: 21st overall, 1963; Toronto Maple Leafs
- Playing career: 1965–1979

Gerard Marcus Meehan (September 3, 1946 – June 5, 2026) was a Canadian professional ice hockey left winger and executive who served as a general manager and senior vice president of the Buffalo Sabres.

== Playing career ==
Meehan was born in Toronto, Ontario and raised in Newmarket, Ontario. He played minor hockey for St. Michael's College School and junior for the Toronto Marlboros. He played for the 1966–67 Marlboros that won the Memorial Cup.

He was drafted by the Toronto Maple Leafs in the 1963 NHL amateur draft, fourth round, 21st overall. He played for the National Hockey League's Toronto Maple Leafs, Philadelphia Flyers, Buffalo Sabres, Vancouver Canucks, Atlanta Flames, Washington Capitals, as well as the Ontario Hockey Association's Toronto Marlboros, American Hockey League's Rochester Americans, CPHL's Tulsa Oilers, Western Hockey League's Phoenix Roadrunners, Seattle Totems, and the World Hockey Association's Cincinnati Stingers. He served as captain for both the Sabres and Capitals.

One of Meehan's career highlights as a Sabre remains a lowlight to Flyers fans. In the last game of the 1971–72 regular season, the Flyers needed a win or a tie against the Sabres to beat out the Pittsburgh Penguins for the final playoff spot. The score was tied, but with just four seconds on the clock, Meehan took a shot from the top of the blue line that somehow got by Flyers goalie Doug Favell – ending the Flyers' season.

== Retirement ==
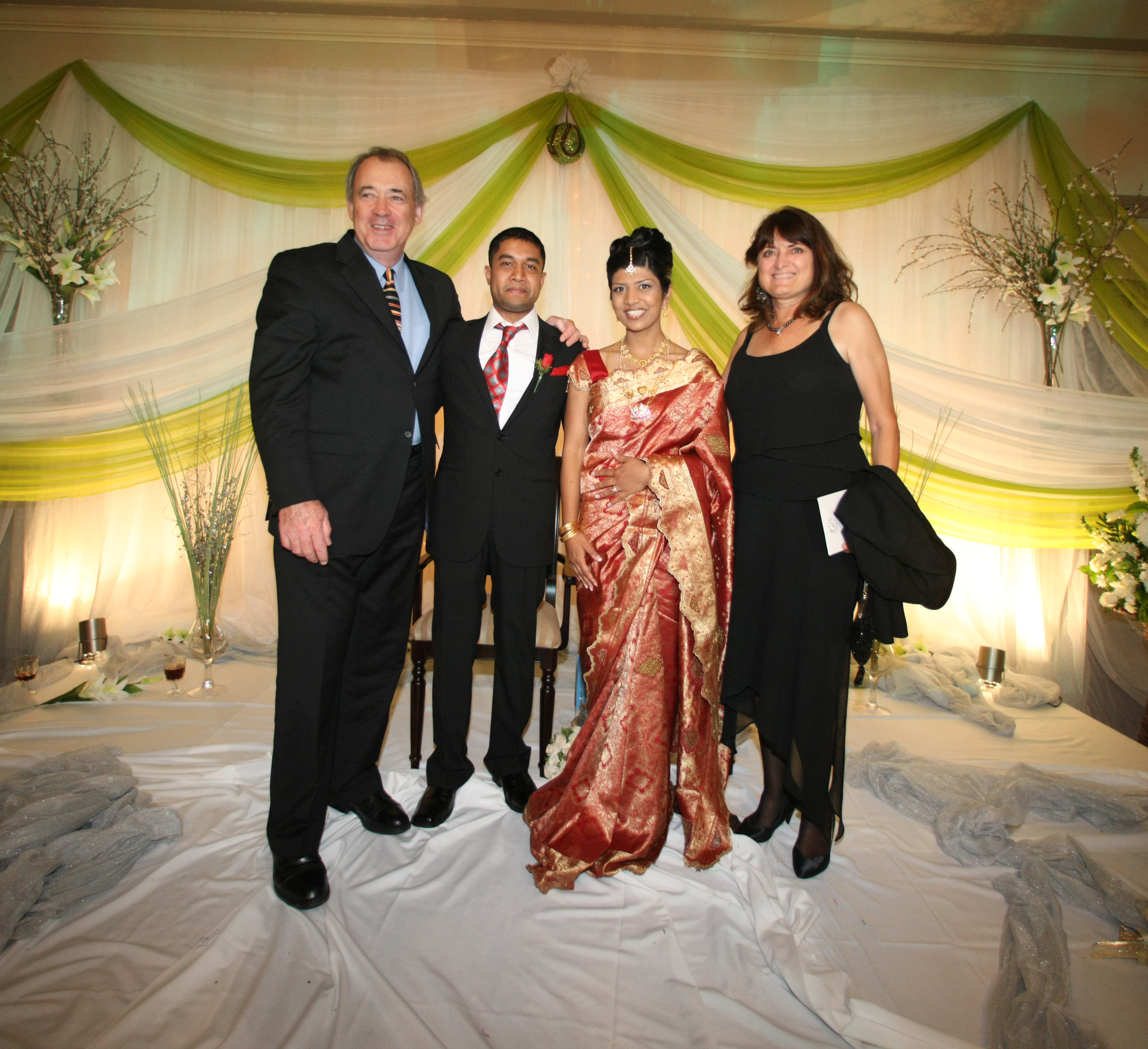
Meehan (far left) in a 2008 photo

After completing his undergraduate degree from Canisius College in Buffalo, Meehan graduated from the University at Buffalo School of Law in 1982. He practiced sports, corporate law, and immigration law with the firm Cohen, Swados, Wright, Hanifin, Bradford and Brett, including working on player contracts with Scotty Bowman, then the Sabres' coach and general manager. Meehan had joined the firm hoping to work with the Sabres.

=== General manager and VP ===
In 1984, the team made Meehan the first former Sabre to serve in a front-office position, as assistant general manager under Bowman. During the 1986–87 season, Bowman stepped down, and Meehan was promoted to general manager. With the departures of Bowman and superstar Gilbert Perreault, the Sabres finished the season in last place overall that year, but rebounded the next year as NHL's most improved team, with a record of 37–32–11 – and 21 points higher in the standings.

Meehan's years as a general manager were marked by the addition of a number of top-caliber players, including No. 1 draft pick Pierre Turgeon, Soviet defector Alex Mogilny, Dale Hawerchuk, Pat LaFontaine, and Dominik Hašek. In 1993, Meehan was named the executive vice president of sports operations, taking a more active role in the organization's business and legal affairs.

=== Later life and death ===
In 1996, Meehan left the Sabres organization and founded GMM Consulting Services, now Cardinal Consultants Ltd., which provides a wide variety of consulting services to sports teams, leagues, associations, and athletes.

Meehan died on June 5, 2026, at the age of 79.

== Career statistics ==
=== Regular season and playoffs ===
			Regular season					Playoffs
Season	Team	League	GP	G	A	Pts	PIM	GP	G	A	Pts	PIM
1962–63	Neil McNeil Maroons	MetJHL	7	1	0	1	0	5	0	0	0	0
1963–64	Toronto Marlies	OHA	12	2	3	5	0	—	—	—	—	—
1964–65	Toronto Marlies	OHA	56	14	30	44	24	19	7	4	11	12
1965–66	Toronto Marlies	OHA	47	25	26	51	47	14	6	10	16	9
1965–66	Rochester Americans	AHL	1	0	0	0	0	—	—	—	—	—
1966–67	Toronto Marlies	OHA	48	26	42	68	27	17	8	8	16	8
1966–67	Toronto Marlies	M-Cup	—	—	—	—	—	9	6	8	14	2
1967–68	Tulsa Oilers	CPHL	70	31	41	72	17	11	3	8	11	0
1968–69	Toronto Maple Leafs	NHL	25	0	2	2	2	—	—	—	—	—
1968–69	Phoenix Roadrunners	WHL	17	6	6	12	2	—	—	—	—	—
1968–69	Philadelphia Flyers	NHL	12	0	3	3	4	4	0	0	0	0
1969–70	Seattle Totems	WHL	67	23	30	53	23	4	0	1	1	0
1970–71	Buffalo Sabres	NHL	77	24	31	55	8	—	—	—	—	—
1971–72	Buffalo Sabres	NHL	77	19	27	46	12	—	—	—	—	—
1972–73	Buffalo Sabres	NHL	77	31	29	60	21	6	0	1	1	0
1973–74	Buffalo Sabres	NHL	72	20	26	46	17	—	—	—	—	—
1974–75	Buffalo Sabres	NHL	3	0	1	1	2	—	—	—	—	—
1974–75	Vancouver Canucks	NHL	57	10	15	25	4	—	—	—	—	—
1974–75	Atlanta Flames	NHL	14	4	10	14	0	—	—	—	—	—
1975–76	Atlanta Flames	NHL	48	7	20	27	8	—	—	—	—	—
1975–76	Washington Capitals	NHL	32	16	15	31	10	—	—	—	—	—
1976–77	Washington Capitals	NHL	80	28	36	64	13	—	—	—	—	—
1977–78	Washington Capitals	NHL	78	19	24	43	10	—	—	—	—	—
1978–79	Washington Capitals	NHL	18	2	4	6	0	—	—	—	—	—
1978–79	Cincinnati Stingers	WHA	2	0	0	0	0	—	—	—	—	—
NHL totals			670	180	243	423	111	10	0	1	1	0
WHA totals			2	0	0	0	0	—	—	—	—	—

Preceded by Floyd Smith	Buffalo Sabres captain 1971–74	Succeeded by Jim Schoenfeld
Preceded by Scotty Bowman	General Manager of the Buffalo Sabres; 1986–93	Succeeded by John Muckler
