= Bryan Murray (ice hockey) =

Canadian professional ice hockey executive and coach

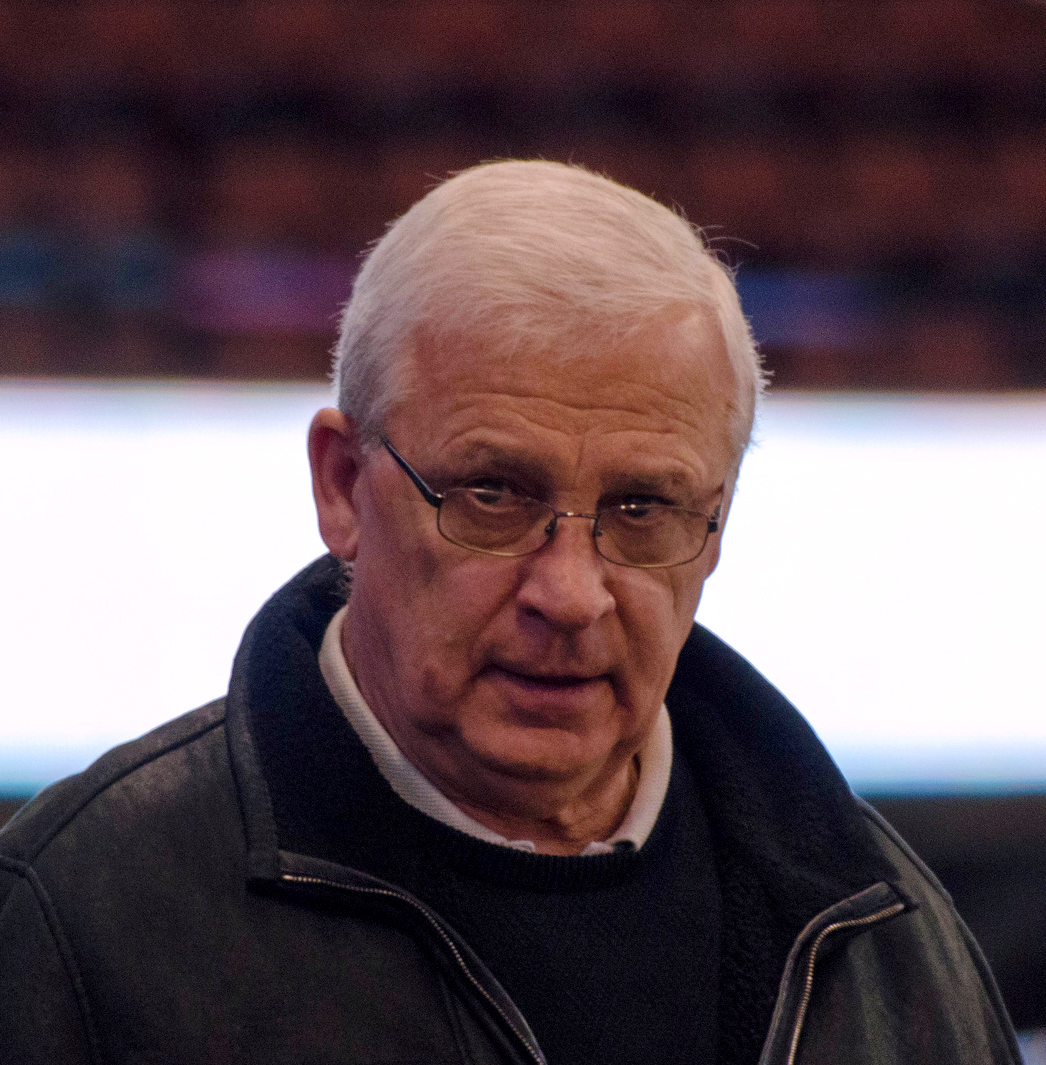
- Murray in 2013
- Born: Bryan Clarence Murray; December 5, 1942; Shawville, Quebec, Canada
- Died: August 12, 2017 (aged 74); Ottawa, Ontario, Canada
- Education: Macdonald College
- Occupations: ice hockey executive, coach
- Spouse: Geri
- Children: 2
- Relatives: Terry Murray (brother); Tim Murray (nephew)

Bryan Clarence Murray (December 5, 1942 – August 12, 2017) was a Canadian professional ice hockey executive and coach. He served as general manager of the Ottawa Senators of the National Hockey League (NHL) from 2007 to 2016. He had previously been general manager of the NHL's Mighty Ducks of Anaheim, Florida Panthers, and Detroit Red Wings. He was also the head coach for the Washington Capitals, Detroit Red Wings, Florida Panthers, Mighty Ducks of Anaheim, and Ottawa Senators, for a total of 17 full or partial seasons.

He compiled over 600 NHL victories in regular season games. In his 13 full NHL seasons as head coach, he took his teams to the playoffs 12 times. In other leagues, he was head coach of the American Hockey League's Hershey Bears and the Western Hockey League's Regina Pats.

== Early life ==
Murray played ice hockey in his hometown of Shawville growing up, joining the Shawville Pontiacs intermediate club at age 14. He later joined the Rockland Nationals of the Central Junior Hockey League. He attended Macdonald College, a suburban campus of McGill University, which is located in Ste. Anne de Bellevue, Quebec, where he played hockey and football. He returned to Shawville and worked as a gym teacher at Pontiac Protestant High School. He then went into business buying a local motel, and starting Murray's Sporting Goods in Shawville, later managed by his wife Geri.

== Early coaching career ==
Murray began his coaching career with the Rockland Nationals in 1976 when the team went all the way and won the Centennial Cup of the Canadian Junior Hockey League (CJHL). He earned a good reputation as a coach and was offered a position with the Pembroke Lumber Kings, and then with the Regina Pats of the Western Hockey League (WHL). He left his business interests in the hands of family members and moved west. He took Regina to the Memorial Cup in 1980. Murray then became the head coach of the American Hockey League's Hershey Bears in 1980–81, and served in that role until he was promoted to head coach of the Washington Capitals, the Hershey Bears' parent NHL team, partway through the next season in 1981–82.

== NHL coach and general manager ==
In seven full seasons with the Capitals, Murray brought the team to the playoffs each year, and these playoff appearances were the first in franchise history. In his second year, the Capitals won their first playoff series. However, his teams did not advance beyond the second round. He won the Jack Adams Award as coach of the year in 1984. Murray was fired partway through the 1989–90 season, with the team struggling, and was replaced by his brother Terry Murray.

In 1990, Murray became a coach and general manager of the Detroit Red Wings. The team had good results in his three seasons, making the playoffs each year, but not getting beyond the second round. He remained as general manager in the 1993–94 season, after the team named Scotty Bowman as head coach. He departed the Red Wings following the season.

Murray was next appointed general manager of the expansion Florida Panthers in 1994. In 1996, the young Panthers made it to the Stanley Cup Finals, and Murray was selected as NHL Executive of the Year. He also coached the Panthers for part of the 1997–98 season.

He next joined the Mighty Ducks of Anaheim as head coach for the 2001–02 season. From 2002 to 2004, Murray was general manager of the Mighty Ducks, and again saw his team quickly make a mark in the playoffs, reaching the Stanley Cup Finals. After a disappointing 2003–04 season with the Mighty Ducks, he surprised many by deciding to resign from the general manager post, and became the head coach of the Ottawa Senators close to his hometown.

On February 20, 2007, he became the fifth NHL coach to achieve 600 victories, in a shootout win against the Edmonton Oilers. Despite this impressive number of victories (at the time the most among active NHL coaches), Murray never won a Stanley Cup. In his most recent trip to the Finals as head coach in 2007, the Senators team that he coached lost in five games to his former club, the Anaheim Ducks.

With the firing of John Muckler on June 18, 2007, Murray was promoted to general manager of the Senators, while assistant coach John Paddock took over the club's head coaching duties. However, on February 27, 2008, following a 15–2 start, which had briefly put the Senators in first place in the Eastern Conference, Murray fired Paddock after the team struggled through a disastrous January and February. Murray stepped in as interim head coach for the remainder of the 2007–08 season, finishing with a 7–9–2 record, with the team ultimately finishing in seventh place in the Eastern Conference. The Senators were swept in the first round of the playoffs by the Pittsburgh Penguins.

Craig Hartsburg was hired as the new coach of the team in June 2008. After the Senators struggled for most of the 2008–09 season, Murray fired Hartsburg after a 7–4 loss against the Capitals. In 48 games as head coach of the Senators, Hartsburg posted a 17–24–7 record. Cory Clouston, head coach of the AHL's Binghamton Senators, the team's top farm club, was hired as interim head coach. Clouston was appointed as head coach with a two-year contract before the next season.

Murray signed a three-year contract extension as general manager on April 8, 2011. He fired Clouston and two assistant coaches on April 9, 2011, following the Senators' last game of the season. The team had been beset by injuries to key players such as captain Daniel Alfredsson and star forward Jason Spezza, leading to a mid-season collapse. Murray made a flurry of trades in 2011, after the Senators had fallen out of contention, and promoted many younger players from the team's Binghamton farm club.

In 2012, Murray was added to the Shawville Hockey Walk of Fame. In 2015, he was inducted into the Ottawa Sports Hall of Fame. In 2017, he was added to the Senators' "Ring of Honour" at Canadian Tire Centre.

== Personal life ==
Murray, one of ten children born to Clarence and Rhoda Murray, was born and raised in the small Ottawa Valley town of Shawville, Quebec, near Ottawa. He had two daughters with his wife Geri, Heide and Brittany.

His younger brother, Terry Murray, was head coach for the Washington Capitals, Philadelphia Flyers, Florida Panthers, and Los Angeles Kings. His nephew, Tim Murray, previously served under Bryan as assistant general manager of the Senators, and later served as the general manager of the Buffalo Sabres.

== Health and death ==
In July 2014, the Senators website announced Murray was diagnosed with cancer and was undergoing treatment. On November 13, 2014, Murray announced he had stage 4 colon cancer, which had spread to his liver and lungs. He said "there is no cure for me at this point" and that he may have had cancer for up to ten years before its detection.

On August 12, 2017, Murray died of colon cancer at the age of 74, three years after he was diagnosed. His funeral was held in his hometown at the Shawville United Church and a Celebration of Life was held at the Canadian Tire Centre. Murray was survived by his wife Geri (née Sutton), daughters Heide and Brittany, and granddaughters Emma and Addie.

The Senators wore a decal on the side of their helmets in his memory for the 2017–18 season, a red circle, inside of which are his initials, years of birth and death, and a brief description of him as a "family man, friend, coach, and mentor." Senators' goaltender Craig Anderson unveiled a new mask for the 2018-19 season which featured Murray's likeness on the left side with the caption "1942-2017". Designed by Sylvie Marsolais, the mask design was Anderson's way of thanking the man who brought him to Ottawa in 2011. "My career took a turn for the better once I met Bryan," said Anderson.

== Coaching record ==
Team	Year	Regular season							Postseason		
Team	Year	G	W	L	T	OTL	Pts	Finish	W	L	Result
WSH	1981–82	66	25	28	13	—	(63)	5th in Patrick	-	-	Missed playoffs
WSH	1982–83	80	39	25	16	—	94	3rd in Patrick	1	3	Lost in Division Semifinals (NYI)
WSH	1983–84	80	48	27	5	—	101	2nd in Patrick	4	4	Lost in Division Finals (NYI)
WSH	1984–85	80	46	25	9	—	101	2nd in Patrick	2	3	Lost in Division Semifinals (NYI)
WSH	1985–86	80	50	23	7	—	107	2nd in Patrick	5	4	Lost in Division Finals (NYR)
WSH	1986–87	80	38	32	10	—	86	2nd in Patrick	3	4	Lost in Division Semifinals (NYI)
WSH	1987–88	80	38	33	9	—	85	3rd in Patrick	7	7	Lost in Division Finals (NJD)
WSH	1988–89	80	41	29	10	—	92	1st in Patrick	2	4	Lost in Division Semifinals (PHI)
WSH	1989–90	46	18	24	4	—	(40)	(fired)	—	—	—
DET	1990–91	80	34	38	8	—	76	3rd in Norris	3	4	Lost in Division Semifinals (STL)
DET	1991–92	80	43	25	12	—	98	1st in Norris	4	7	Lost in Division Finals (CHI)
DET	1992–93	84	47	28	9	—	103	2nd in Norris	3	4	Lost in Division Semifinals (TOR)
FLA	1997–98	59	17	31	11	—	(45)	6th in Atlantic	-	-	Missed playoffs
ANA	2001–02	82	29	42	8	3	69	5th in Pacific	-	-	Missed playoffs
OTT	2005–06	82	52	21	—	9	113	1st in Northeast	5	5	Lost in Conference Semifinals (BUF)
OTT	2006–07	82	48	25	—	9	105	2nd in Northeast	13	7	Lost in Stanley Cup Finals (ANA)
OTT	2007–08	18	7	9	—	2	(16)	2nd in Northeast	0	4	Lost in Conference Quarterfinals (PIT)
WSH Total		672	343	246	83	—	769	1 Division title	24	29	7 playoff appearances
DET Total		244	124	91	29	—	277	1 Division title	10	15	3 playoff appearances
OTT Total		182	107	55	—	20	234	1 Division title	18	16	3 playoff appearances
ANA Total		82	29	42	8	3	69	0 Division titles	—	—	0 playoff appearances
FLA Total		59	17	31	11	—	45	0 Division titles	—	—	0 playoff appearances
Total		1,239	620	465	131	23	1,394	3 Division titles	52	60	13 playoff appearances

Preceded by Roger Crozier	Head coach of the Washington Capitals; 1981–1990	Succeeded by Terry Murray
Preceded by Orval Tessier	Winner of the Jack Adams Award; 1984	Succeeded by Mike Keenan
Preceded by Jacques Demers	Head coach of the Detroit Red Wings; 1990–1993	Succeeded by Scotty Bowman
Preceded by Jim Devellano	General manager of the Detroit Red Wings; 1990–1994	Succeeded by Jim Devellano and Scotty Bowman
Preceded by Doug MacLean	Head coach of the Florida Panthers; 1997–98	Succeeded by Terry Murray
Preceded by Bobby Clarke	General manager of the Florida Panthers; 1994–2000	Succeeded by Bill Torrey
Preceded by Guy Charron	Head coach of the Mighty Ducks of Anaheim; 2001–2002	Succeeded by Mike Babcock
Preceded by Pierre Gauthier	General Manager of the Mighty Ducks of Anaheim; 2002–2004	Succeeded by Al Coates
Preceded by Jacques Martin	Head coach of the Ottawa Senators; 2005–2007	Succeeded by John Paddock
Preceded by John Muckler	General manager of the Ottawa Senators; 2007–2016	Succeeded by Pierre Dorion
Preceded by John Paddock	Head coach of the Ottawa Senators; 2008	Succeeded by Craig Hartsburg
