= Tim Murray (ice hockey executive) =

Canadian ice hockey executive (born 1963)

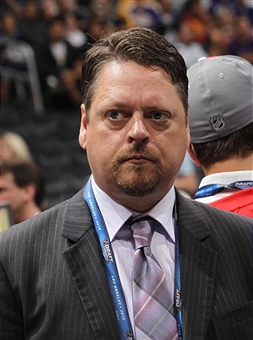
- Murray at the 2010 NHL entry draft
- Born: October 31, 1963 (age 62); Shawville, Quebec, Canada
- Occupation: Former NHL executive

Tim Murray (born October 31, 1963) is a Canadian ice hockey executive.

Prior to 2014, Murray served as general manager of the Binghamton Senators of the American Hockey League and assistant general manager of the NHL's Ottawa Senators under his uncle Bryan Murray; he previously held positions as a scout with the Detroit Red Wings, Florida Panthers, Anaheim Ducks and New York Rangers. From 2014 to 2017, Murray was the general manager of the Buffalo Sabres of the National Hockey League (NHL); with a tenure of less than four seasons, he had the shortest tenure of any permanent general manager in Sabres history (Murray's successor, Jason Botterill, would have a slightly shorter tenure and was fired after only three full seasons).

== History ==
- 1993–1994: scout for the Detroit Red Wings
- 1994–2002: scout for the Florida Panthers
- 2002–2005: director of player personnel for the Anaheim Ducks
- 2005–2007: scout for the New York Rangers
- 2007–2014: general manager for the Binghamton Senators
- 2007–2014: assistant general manager for the Ottawa Senators
- 2014–2017: general manager for the Rochester Americans
- 2014–2017: general manager for the Buffalo Sabres

== Personal life ==
Murray was born in Shawville, Quebec to Barrie Murray, a retired owner of an automotive shop and Sandra Horner Murray, who became mayor of Shawville a few months before Tim became GM of the Buffalo Sabres. Barrie's automotive shop was in the same building as his brother Bill's sporting goods store. While growing up in Shawville, Tim worked for both his dad in the automotive shop and also for his Uncle Bill in the sporting goods store.

He is a nephew of the late coach and general manager, Bryan Murray, and son of former player and coach Terry Murray.

On July 21, 2012, he joined his uncles, Bryan and Terry, as inaugural inductees in Shawville’s Hockey Wall of Fame.

Preceded by Darcy Regier	General manager of the Buffalo Sabres; 2014–2017	Succeeded by Jason Botterill
