= Pontiac High School =

Pontiac High School can refer to:

In Canada:

In the United States:

- Pontiac High School (Michigan)
- Pontiac Township High School, Illinois
