= Darcy Regier =

- Born: November 27, 1956 (age 69) Swift Current, Saskatchewan, Canada
- Height: 5 ft 11 in (180 cm)
- Weight: 190 lb (86 kg; 13 st 8 lb)
- Position: Defense
- Shot: Left
- Played for: New York Islanders; Cleveland Barons
- NHL draft: 77th overall, 1976; California Golden Seals
- Playing career: 1976–1984

Darcy John Regier (born November 27, 1956) is a Canadian professional ice hockey executive and former player. Regier was general manager of the Buffalo Sabres in the National Hockey League from 1997 until 2013. He was the longest-serving and winningest GM in Sabres history. In 2014, he became a senior vice president and assistant general manager with the Arizona Coyotes, ending his tenure with Arizona in 2016. Regier played 26 games in the NHL for the Cleveland Barons and New York Islanders as a defenseman.

== Playing career ==
Regier began his professional career with the Lethbridge Broncos of the Western Hockey League in 1974. After two seasons with the Broncos he was drafted by the California Seals of the NHL and made the NHL in 1977–78 with the Cleveland Barons, who had moved from California the season he was drafted. He played 15 games with the Barons before being sent down to the minors. He was traded on January 10, 1978, to the New York Islanders with Wayne Merrick for J. P. Parisé and Jean Potvin.

Regier stayed in the minors until 1982–83, when he was called up to the Islanders. He played in 11 NHL games during the next two seasons and then retired as a player to join the Isles' front office.

== Administrative career ==
From 1984-91, Regier served in various capacities with the Islanders, under coach Al Arbour and general manager Bill Torrey. He left to take a position as assistant coach with the Hartford Whalers for the 1991–92 season. He then returned to the Islanders, serving as assistant GM to Don Maloney and as interim GM when Maloney was fired during the 1995–96 season. Regier was fired by the Islanders in 1997, then hired as GM of the Buffalo Sabres in the summer of the same year.

In Regier’s second season as GM (1998–99), the Sabres reached the Stanley Cup Finals before losing to the Dallas Stars in six games. Game six of that series ended with a controversial overtime goal scored by Brett Hull.

The Sabres finished the post-lockout 2005-06 season with a 52-24-6 record. That year, they reached the conference finals of the playoffs, losing to the Carolina Hurricanes, who would go on to win the Stanley Cup.

The Sabres won the Presidents’ Trophy for the best regular season record the next year (2006-07). They again reached the conference finals, losing to the Ottawa Senators in five games.

Co-captains Chris Drury and Daniel Brière did not re-sign with the Sabres in the summer of 2007. In February 2008, Regier also traded All-Star defenceman Brian Campbell at the trade deadline.

During the 2007–08 NHL season, the Sabres went 39-31-12, missing the playoffs for the first time since the NHL lockout. Over the next five seasons, the Sabres reached the playoffs twice, in 2009-10 and 2010-11, losing out both times in the conference quarterfinals.

On November 13, 2013, Regier was fired from the Buffalo Sabres after sixteen full seasons.

Regier’s tenure with the Sabres was marked by three ownership changes and periods of economic hardship, particularly in 2003 when the team filed for bankruptcy protection. Regier was frequently praised for creating results despite severe budget restrictions. He and head coach Lindy Ruff were for several years the longest GM-coach tandem in the NHL. Regier’s style of trading players was known as patient and was at times criticized as overly cautious. He is recognized as an NHL pioneer in video scouting and analytics. The Corsi number, a widely used advanced statistic, was originally to be named the "Regier number" by blogger Vic Ferrari, who first heard Regier discussing the principle (in the end, Ferrari preferred the sound of "Corsi number").

During his years as GM, the Sabres drafted and developed such players as Maxim Afinogenov, Henrik Tallinder, Aleš Kotalík, Ryan Miller, Paul Gaustad, Derek Roy, Jason Pominville and Thomas Vanek. Regier also made important acquisitions, trading for Chris Drury, Tim Connolly, Daniel Brière and Jean-Pierre Dumont while maintaining a strict budget.

Out of the 149 players Regier has drafted, four of them have been chosen as all-stars. These players are Brian Campbell, Ryan Miller, Jason Pominville, and Thomas Vanek.

At the end of his tenure with Buffalo, Regier began an extensive rebuild of the team, trading longtime stars Thomas Vanek and Jason Pominville.

In July 2014, Regier was hired as a Senior Vice President of the Arizona Coyotes. In June 2015, his duties were extended to include serving as the general manager of the Coyotes' AHL-affiliate, the Springfield Falcons.

In February 2016, Regier left the Arizona Coyotes for personal reasons.

== Career statistics ==
=== Regular season and playoffs ===
			Regular season					Playoffs
Season	Team	League	GP	G	A	Pts	PIM	GP	G	A	Pts	PIM
1973–74	Prince Albert Raiders	SJHL	40	1	8	9	59	6	0	2	2	4
1974–75	Lethbridge Broncos	WCHL	67	11	25	36	78	6	0	3	3	9
1975–76	Lethbridge Broncos	WCHL	53	5	22	27	125	7	1	1	2	9
1976–77	Salt Lake Golden Eagles	CHL	68	5	22	27	123	—	—	—	—	—
1977–78	Phoenix Roadrunners	CHL	16	0	5	5	43	—	—	—	—	—
1977–78	Fort Worth Texans	CHL	38	2	6	8	37	14	2	6	8	24
1977–78	Binghamton Dusters	AHL	5	0	1	1	2	—	—	—	—	—
1977–78	Cleveland Barons	NHL	15	0	1	1	28	—	—	—	—	—
1978–79	Fort Worth Texans	CHL	59	1	15	16	98	5	0	1	1	2
1979–80	Indianapolis Checkers	CHL	79	0	18	18	52	7	0	1	1	20
1980–81	Indianapolis Checkers	CHL	76	2	18	20	77	5	0	1	1	27
1981–82	Indianapolis Checkers	CHL	80	4	17	21	98	13	1	4	5	20
1982–83	Indianapolis Checkers	CHL	74	3	28	31	102	11	0	4	4	21
1982–83	New York Islanders	NHL	6	0	0	0	7	—	—	—	—	—
1983–84	Indianapolis Checkers	CHL	68	4	12	16	112	10	1	1	2	13
1983–84	New York Islanders	NHL	5	0	1	1	0	—	—	—	—	—
CHL totals			558	21	141	162	742	65	4	18	22	127
NHL totals			26	0	2	2	35	—	—	—	—	—

Preceded by John Muckler	General Manager of the Buffalo Sabres; 1997–2013	Succeeded by Tim Murray
Preceded by Don Maloney	Interim General Manager of the New York Islanders; 1995	Succeeded by Mike Milbury
