= John Anderson (ice hockey general manager) =

Danish-Canadian ice hockey executive

John Anderson (July 19, 1934 – January 22, 2009) was a Danish-Canadian former ice hockey executive who was the interim General Manager of the Buffalo Sabres from December 4, 1978, to June 11, 1979, taking his team to the 1979 playoffs.
