= Botterill =

Botterill is an English surname of Norman origin deriving from Les Bottereaux. Notable people with this surname include:

- Cal Botterill (born 1947), Canadian sports psychologist
- George Botterill (born 1949), English chess player and writer
- Jason Botterill (born 1976), American ice hockey manager and former player
- Jennifer Botterill (born 1979), Canadian hockey player
- Joseph Botterill (1862–1920) pastoralist and South Australian politician
- Michael Botterill (born 1980), Canadian football player
- Nick Botterill (born 1962), British businessman
- William Botterill, (1820–1903), architect
- Doreen McCannell-Botterill (born 1947), Canadian winter sports athlete

== See also ==
- Bottrill
