= List of Seattle Kraken general managers =

American ice hockey team managers

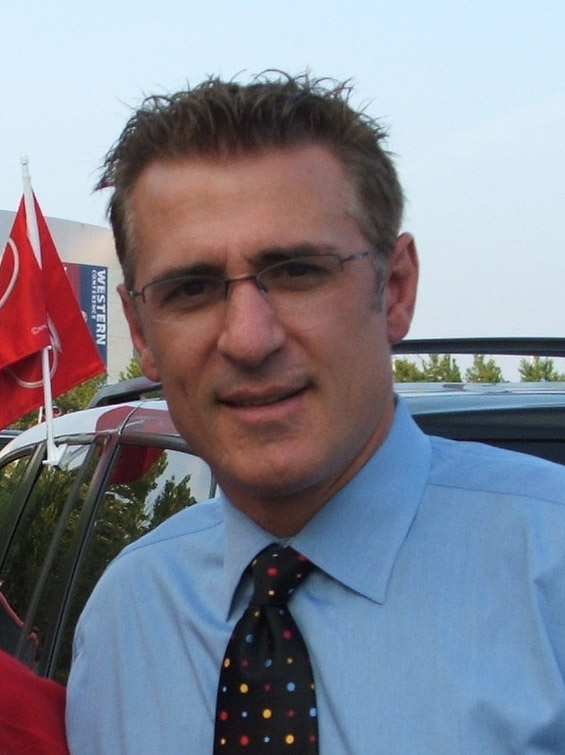
Ron Francis served as the general manager of the Seattle Kraken from 2019 to 2025.

The Seattle Kraken are a professional ice hockey team based in Seattle. They are members of the Pacific Division of the National Hockey League (NHL). Since their arrival in 2021, they have had two general managers. On July 18, 2019, when the Kraken were first being established, former Carolina Hurricanes general manager and long-time NHL player Ron Francis was named the team's first general manager. That same day, Kraken chief executive officer Tod Leiweke stated that hiring Francis was "perhaps the most important hire we [the Seattle Kraken] will ever make." This is because Francis would oversee all of the club's hockey operations, including facets like player personnel, coaching staff, scouting, and minor league operations. Francis later stated that three things he wanted to prioritize in the Kraken's roster were speed, character, and competitiveness.

On April 22, 2025, Francis was removed from his position, being replaced by former Kraken assistant general manager Jason Botterill. Following the change, Francis was named president of hockey operations of the Kraken.

== Key ==
Key of terms and definitions
| Term | Definition |
|---|---|
| No. | Number of general managers |
| Ref(s) | References |

== General managers ==
General managers of the Seattle Kraken franchise
| No. | Name | Tenure | Accomplishments during tenure | Ref(s) |
|---|---|---|---|---|
| 1 | Ron Francis | July 18, 2019 — April 22, 2025 | 1 playoff appearance | |
| 2 | Jason Botterill | April 22, 2025 — present | | |

== See also ==
- List of NHL general managers
