= Bottrall =

Bottrall is a surname. Notable people with the surname include:

- Anthony Bottrall (1938–2014), British diplomat and politician
- Ronald Bottrall (1906–1989), Cornish poet

== See also ==
- Bottrill
