= Cal Botterill =

Canadian sports psychologist and ice hockey player

Cal Botterill (born October 17, 1947) is a Canadian sports psychologist. He played for the Canada men's national ice hockey team from 1967 to 1969. He received a PhD from the University of Alberta. Botterill is a professor at the University of Winnipeg and teaches courses in sport psychology. He wrote a book entitled Perspective with Tom Patrick. He has also worked as a sports psychology consultant for numerous teams in the National Hockey League, including the Calgary Flames, Chicago Blackhawks, Los Angeles Kings, and Philadelphia Flyers.

== Personal life ==
Botterill's family has been active in sports. Son Jason played with the Canadian National Junior Hockey team and is the general manager of the Seattle Kraken. Daughter Jennifer graduated from Harvard University and has participated in women's ice hockey at the Winter Olympics on four occasions. Jennifer was inducted into the Hockey Hall of Fame in 2025. His wife Doreen McCannell was inducted into the Manitoba Sports Hall of Fame in 1995.

== Awards and honors ==
- Sport Manitoba Award of Excellence
