= Bottrill =

Bottrill is an English surname. Notable people with the surname include:

- Allan Bottrill (1905–1929), English footballer, brother of Billy
- Billy Bottrill (Walter Gibson Bottrill) (1903–1986), English footballer
- David Bottrill, Canadian music producer
- Frank Bottrill (1871–1953), Australian blacksmith and inventor
- Pat Bottrill, English nurse
- William Bottrill (1892–1971), English-born Canadian WWI flying ace

== See also ==
- Bottrill Head, headland in Antarctica
- Botterill
