= Kraken Community Iceplex =

Ice hockey arena in Seattle, Washington

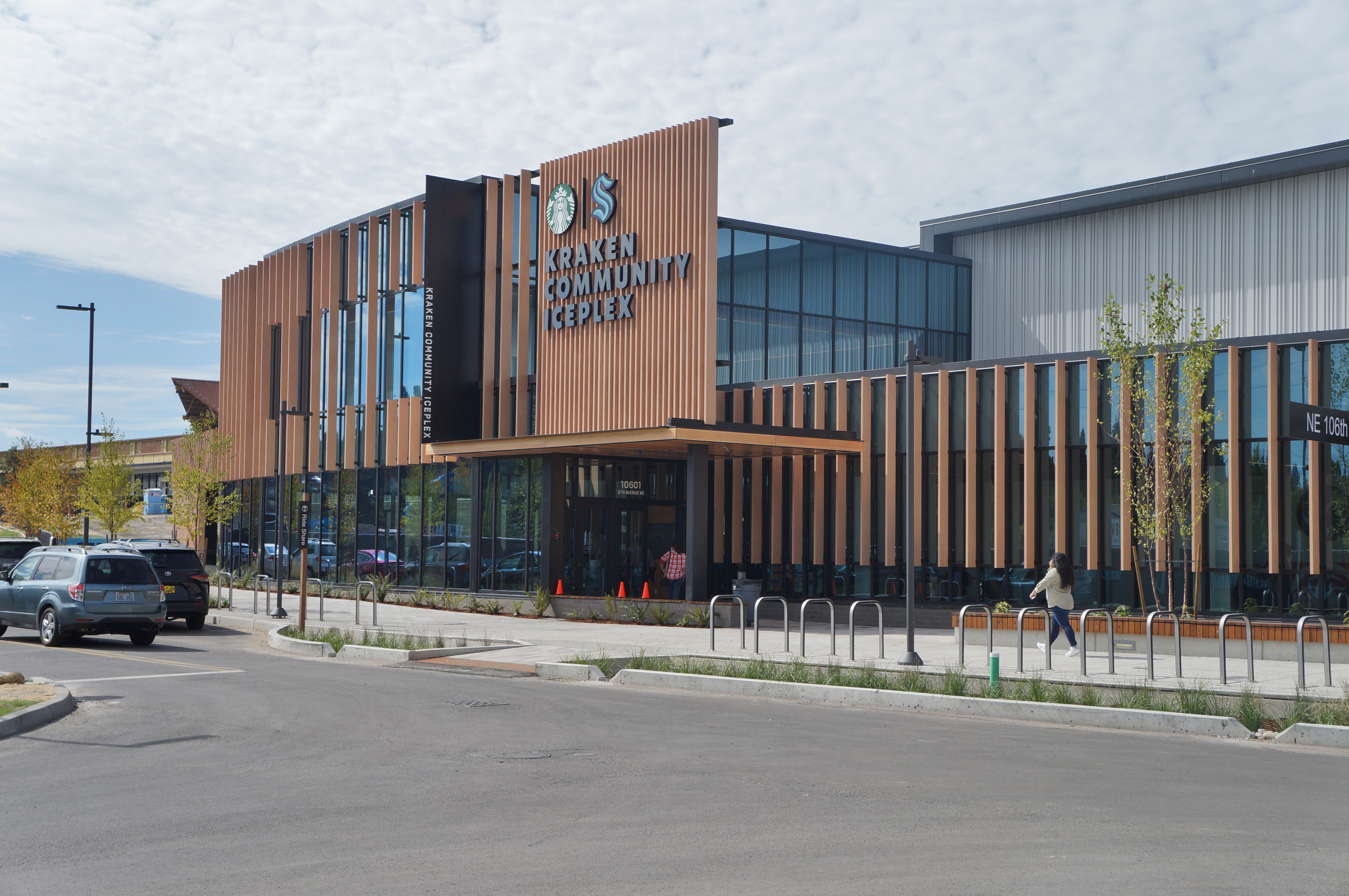
- The east entrance of the Iceplex in 2021
- Interactive map of Kraken Community Iceplex
- Address: 10601 5th Avenue NE
- Location: Seattle, Washington
- Coordinates: 47°42′22″N 122°19′31″W
- Owner: Seattle Kraken
- Operator: Seattle Kraken
- Surface: 200' x 85' (3 rinks)
- Public transit: Link light rail King County Metro

Construction
- Groundbreaking: February 27, 2020
- Opened: September 10, 2021

Tenants
- Seattle Kraken (practice facility); Seattle Torrent (practice facility)

The Kraken Community Iceplex is the practice facility and team headquarters of the Seattle Kraken of the National Hockey League (NHL). It opened on September 10, 2021, and is located within the Northgate Station mixed-use development in the Northgate neighborhood of Seattle, Washington. The building also serves as the training facility of the Seattle Torrent, a Professional Women's Hockey League franchise that began play in the 2025–26 season.

== History ==
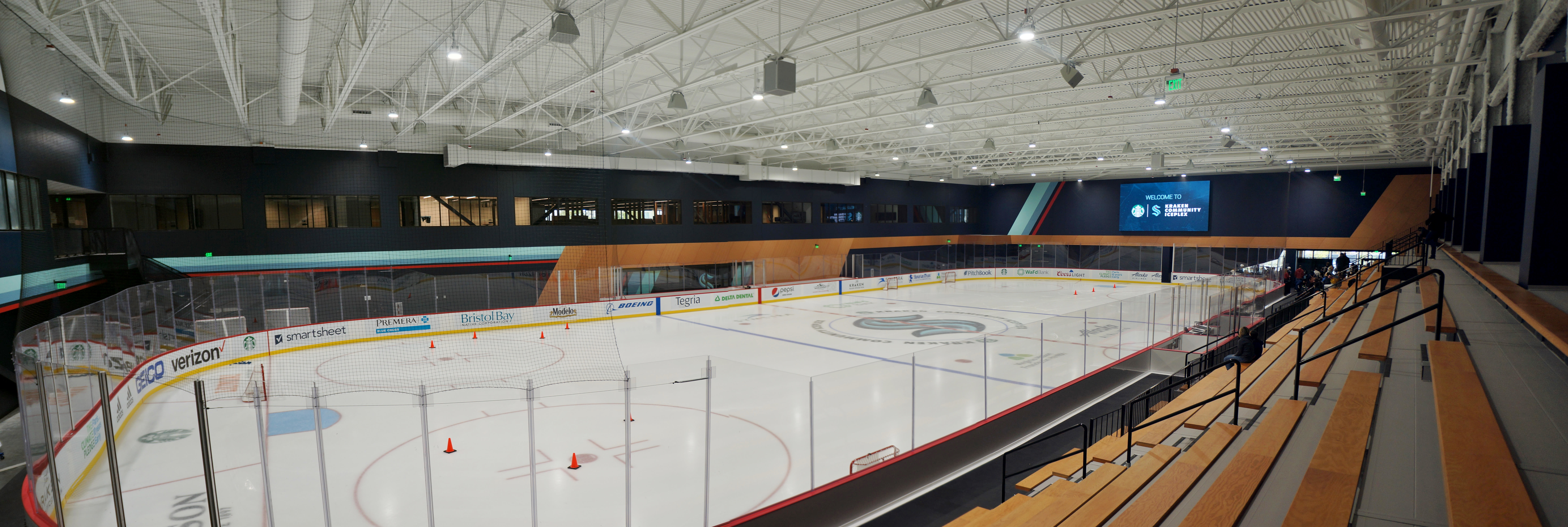
Indoor view of the Iceplex's main rink

In 2018, Simon Property Group announced their intention to redevelop the 55-acre Northgate Mall, located in Seattle's Northgate neighborhood, into a mixed-use center featuring hotels, housing, offices, and an ice hockey facility, in addition to retail space. The redevelopment replaced several parking lots adjacent to a nearby light rail station. The hockey facility was to be used by and serve as the headquarters for the NHL's Seattle expansion franchise who had recently been accepted into the league.

Following a partnership deal with Seattle-based company Starbucks, the $80 million construction for the ice hockey facility, named the Kraken Community Iceplex, began following the groundbreaking ceremony on February 27, 2020. The Iceplex's 19-month construction was completed in September 2021, and an open-house took place that same month.

The 172,000-square-foot (16,000 m^{2}) venue was designed by Generator Studio and built by BNBuilders. The facility has 1,000 seats around its main rink and 400 seats at two other rinks primarily for community use. The main rink was ready in the summer of 2021, and the other two were ready in the fall. It also has a restaurant, known as the 32 Bar & Grill, as well as health clinic.

== Events ==
The Iceplex hosts the USA Hockey-sanctioned Seattle Jr. Kraken, a team which competes at many different levels of hockey; the recreation team plays in the Puget Sound-area Metropolitan Hockey League, the select team plays in the Pacific Northwest Amateur Hockey Association, and the Tier 1/AAA team competes at higher levels.

The American Hockey League (AHL) affiliate of the Kraken, the Coachella Valley Firebirds, started a series of games in Seattle and Everett during their inaugural 2022–23 season pending construction of their arena, playing games against the Abbotsford Canucks and the Calgary Wranglers at the Iceplex as well as Climate Pledge Arena and Angel of the Winds Arena in four games throughout October. Two of the four games were played at the Iceplex, the first resulting in a 4–3 loss to the Canucks and the second a 5–3 win over the Wranglers.

The Professional Women's Hockey League Seattle expansion team, the Seattle Torrent, began play during the 2025–26 season. The team uses the Iceplex as their training facility.
