= Doreen McCannell-Botterill =

Canadian speed skater

Doreen McCannell Botterill (born July 29, 1947) is a Canadian speed skater. She competed for Canada in speed skating at the 1964 and 1968 Winter Olympics. She had won the 1966 North American Senior Ladies Championship. In 1995, she was inducted into the Manitoba Sports Hall of Fame.

== Personal life ==
McCannell-Botterill was born in Winnipeg, Manitoba. She is married to Cal Botterill, a sports psychologist who worked with the Canadian men's national hockey team. Her children are Jennifer Botterill and Jason Botterill. Jennifer is an ice hockey player and commentator who won three gold medals and one silver for Team Canada at the Winter Olympics. She was inducted into the Hockey Hall of Fame in 2025 and is the only two-time winner of the Patty Kazmaier Award. Jason was drafted by the Dallas Stars at the 1994 NHL Draft.
