= Jason Botterill =

Canadian ice hockey player and executive

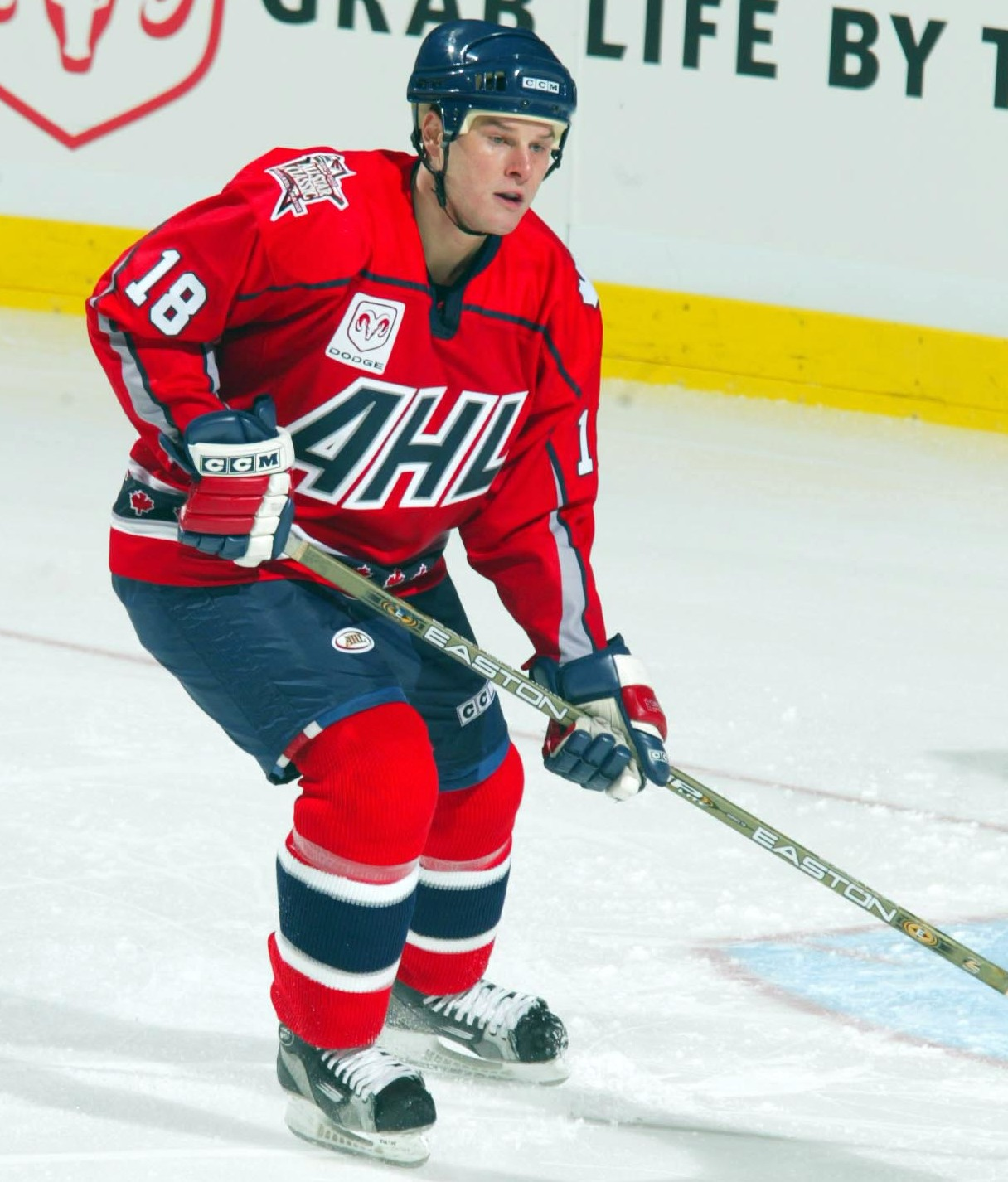
- Botterill in the 2003 AHL All-Star Game
- Born: May 19, 1976 (age 50) Edmonton, Alberta, Canada
- Height: 6 ft 4 in (193 cm)
- Weight: 220 lb (100 kg; 15 st 10 lb)
- Position: Left wing
- Shot: Left
- Played for: Dallas Stars; Atlanta Thrashers; Calgary Flames; Buffalo Sabres
- NHL draft: 20th overall, 1994; Dallas Stars
- Playing career: 1997–2005
Medal record
Representing Canada
Ice hockey
World Junior Championships
Gold medal – first place	1994 Ostrava
Gold medal – first place	1995 Red Deer
Gold medal – first place	1996 Massachusetts

Jason Drandon Botterill (born May 19, 1976) is a Canadian former professional ice hockey left winger and executive who is the general manager of the Seattle Kraken of the National Hockey League (NHL). Botterill was the former associate GM of the Pittsburgh Penguins before serving as general manager of the Buffalo Sabres from May 11, 2017, to June 16, 2020.

== Playing career ==
Botterill was drafted by the Dallas Stars in the first round with the 20th overall selection of the 1994 NHL entry draft. Before turning pro, he played four seasons (1993–97) at the University of Michigan, where he helped lead the Wolverines to an NCAA national championship in 1996. He is the only Canadian to ever win a gold medal in three straight World Junior Hockey Championships. In eight seasons as a pro, Botterill played in 481 professional games, including 88 in the National Hockey League with the Dallas Stars, Atlanta Thrashers, Calgary Flames, and Buffalo Sabres. Other stops in his career included the Michigan K-Wings and Orlando Solar Bears of the International Hockey League and the Saint John Flames of the American Hockey League, where he was a member of the 2001 Calder Cup championship team. After serving as the Flames captain in 2001–02, Botterill signed with Buffalo as a free agent.

Botterill's career was abruptly halted when, as a member of the Rochester Americans, he suffered a concussion during a game against the Syracuse Crunch on October 31, 2004. After missing the next 49 games, Botterill announced his retirement from hockey.

== Management career ==
Botterill received his MBA from The Stephen M. Ross School of Business at the University of Michigan in 2007. Following his playing career, he worked with the NHL Offices and the NHL Central Registry and spent the 2006–2007 season as a scout for the Dallas Stars.

On July 17, 2007, the Pittsburgh Penguins announced Botterill's hiring as director of hockey administration. His main responsibilities included monitoring the salary cap and contract research and negotiations, but also worked with salary arbitration and preparation as well as scouting. Botterill was promoted by the Penguins to assistant general manager on May 22, 2009. He replaced Chuck Fletcher, who was named general manager of the Minnesota Wild on the same day. In The Hockey News 2011 edition of the 100 Most Powerful People in ice hockey, Botterill was considered one of the Top 40 under the age of 40. On May 16, 2014, Botterill was named as interim general manager of the Pittsburgh Penguins and as a candidate for the full position. On June 6, 2014, Jim Rutherford was named general manager of the Penguins. In his press conference, Rutherford announced that Botterill would be named associate general manager of the Penguins.

On May 11, 2017, the Buffalo Sabres announced that Botterill had been hired as the team's general manager. He was fired by the Sabres on June 16, 2020.

On January 5, 2021, the Seattle Kraken announced that Botterill had been hired as the team's assistant general manager.

On April 22, 2025, the Kraken would promote Botterill to general manager after promoting previous general manager Ron Francis to president of hockey operations.

== Personal life ==
Botterill was born in Edmonton, Alberta, but grew up in Winnipeg, Manitoba. Jason's sister, Jennifer Botterill, is an ice hockey player and commentator who won three gold medals and one silver for Team Canada at the Winter Olympics. She was inducted into the Hockey Hall of Fame in 2025 and is the only two-time winner of the Patty Kazmaier Award. His mother, Doreen McCannell, participated in speed skating at the 1964 and 1968 Winter Olympics. His father, Cal Botterill, is a professor at the University of Winnipeg.

== Career statistics ==
=== Regular season and playoffs ===
			Regular season					Playoffs
Season	Team	League	GP	G	A	Pts	PIM	GP	G	A	Pts	PIM
1992–93	St. Paul's School	HS-Prep	22	22	26	48	—	—	—	—	—	—
1993–94	University of Michigan	CCHA	37	21	19	40	94	—	—	—	—	—
1994–95	University of Michigan	CCHA	34	14	14	28	117	—	—	—	—	—
1995–96	University of Michigan	CCHA	37	32	25	57	143	—	—	—	—	—
1996–97	University of Michigan	CCHA	42	37	24	61	129	—	—	—	—	—
1997–98	Dallas Stars	NHL	4	0	0	0	19	—	—	—	—	—
1997–98	Michigan K-Wings	IHL	50	11	11	22	82	4	0	0	0	5
1998–99	Dallas Stars	NHL	17	0	0	0	23	—	—	—	—	—
1998–99	Michigan K-Wings	IHL	56	13	25	38	106	5	2	1	3	4
1999–2000	Atlanta Thrashers	NHL	25	1	4	5	17	—	—	—	—	—
1999–2000	Orlando Solar Bears	IHL	17	7	8	15	27	—	—	—	—	—
1999–2000	Calgary Flames	NHL	2	0	0	0	0	—	—	—	—	—
1999–2000	Saint John Flames	AHL	21	3	4	7	39	3	0	0	0	19
2000–01	Saint John Flames	AHL	60	13	20	33	101	19	2	7	9	30
2001–02	Calgary Flames	NHL	4	1	0	1	2	—	—	—	—	—
2001–02	Saint John Flames	AHL	71	21	21	42	121	—	—	—	—	—
2002–03	Buffalo Sabres	NHL	17	1	4	5	14	—	—	—	—	—
2002–03	Rochester Americans	AHL	64	37	22	59	105	3	1	1	2	21
2003–04	Buffalo Sabres	NHL	19	2	1	3	14	—	—	—	—	—
2003–04	Rochester Americans	AHL	46	16	17	33	68	16	5	10	15	19
2004–05	Rochester Americans	AHL	8	6	2	8	9	—	—	—	—	—
AHL totals			270	96	86	182	443	41	8	18	26	89
NHL totals			88	5	9	14	89	—	—	—	—	—

=== International ===
Year	Team	Event	Result	GP	G	A	Pts	PIM
1994	Canada	WJC	1st place, gold medalist(s)	7	1	0	1	8
1995	Canada	WJC	1st place, gold medalist(s)	7	0	4	4	6
1996	Canada	WJC	1st place, gold medalist(s)	6	1	3	4	6
Junior totals				20	2	7	9	20

== Awards and honours ==
Award	Year
All-CCHA Rookie Team	1993–94
All-CCHA Second team	1995–96
AHCA West Second-Team All-American	1996–97
CCHA All-Tournament Team	1997

Sporting positions
Preceded by Todd Harvey	Dallas Stars first-round draft pick 1994	Succeeded by Jarome Iginla
Preceded by Ray Shero	Interim general manager of the Pittsburgh Penguins; 2014	Succeeded by Jim Rutherford
Preceded by Tim Murray	General manager of the Buffalo Sabres; 2017–2020	Succeeded by Kevyn Adams
Preceded by Ron Francis	General manager of the Seattle Kraken; 2025–present	Incumbent
