= Pat Bottrill =

British nurse and nursing administrator

Patricia "Pat" Bottrill, MBE, FRCN (born 1942) is a British nurse and was awarded fellowship of the Royal College of Nursing in 2004 for her outstanding contribution to the establishment and development of endoscopy and gastroenterology nursing in both the United Kingdom and internationally. Bottrill was awarded the MBE in the 1997 New Year Honours list for services to nursing and health care. She was awarded an RCN Award of Merit in 1995, and was awarded Fellowship of the Royal College of Nursing in 2004. Bottrill resigned as Chair of the RCN Council in 2002 after making a remark at a meeting that was considered inappropriate.

== Life ==
Bottrill was born in 1942 in Whitley Bay. She qualified as a nurse in 1963 at the Leicester Royal Infirmary and nursed on a paediatric ward for three years.She also worked in palliative care as a Marie Curie nurse. She later worked on a medical ward in Newcastle-upon-Tyne, after having joined the first Nurse Bank, and then worked in endoscopy. Bottrill was Sister in Charge of the Gastroenterology Unit at the Royal Victoria Infirmary, Newcastle. In 1990 she chaired the British Society of Gastroenterology Endoscopy Nurse Associates.

Bottrill was awarded the MBE in the 1997 New Year Honours list for services to nursing and health care. She was awarded an RCN Award of Merit in 1995, was awarded Fellowship of the Royal College of Nursing in 2004. She retired from nursing in 2001.

Bottrill was Chair of RCN Council until August 2002 when she was pressured to resign after making a purportedly "inappropriate and offensive" remark at a meeting when she used the term "10 Little Niggers", the original title of Agatha Christie's very atypical murder mystery, And Then There Were None.

Bottrill denied any racial connotation and stated that the term was not used in a racial context. She stated that the term was used when in a meeting the attendance was rapidly dropping off referring to the premise of the book, as one by one the individuals are killed, leaving only one person. It was stated by the Royal College of Nursing that one need only look at Bottrill's career and years of advocacy on behalf of nurses to see that it was an unfortunate slip of the tongue, referring back to the title of a book that was once in common use.
