= Seattle Kraken =

National Hockey League team in Seattle, Washington

- 2026–27 Seattle Kraken season
- Conference: Western
- Division: Pacific
- Founded: 2021
- History: Seattle Kraken; 2021–present
- Home arena: Climate Pledge Arena
- City: Seattle, Washington
- Team colors: Deep sea blue, ice blue, boundless blue, shadow blue, red alert
- Media: KONG; KING-TV; Amazon Prime; KJR FM 93.3; KJR AM 950
- Owner(s): One Roof Sports & Entertainment
- General manager: Jason Botterill
- Head coach: Lane Lambert
- Captain: Jordan Eberle
- Minor league affiliates: Coachella Valley Firebirds (AHL); Kansas City Mavericks (ECHL)
- Stanley Cups: 0
- Conference championships: 0
- Presidents' Trophies: 0
- Division championships: 0
- Official website: nhl.com/kraken

The Seattle Kraken are a professional ice hockey team based in Seattle. The Kraken compete in the National Hockey League (NHL) as a member of the Pacific Division in the Western Conference. The team was founded after the NHL approved a proposal by Seattle Hockey Partners to grant an expansion franchise to the city of Seattle and began play during the league's 2021–22 season. They play their home games at Climate Pledge Arena.

The Kraken struggled during their inaugural season and finished last in the Pacific Division with 60 points. During the 2022–23 season, the team achieved a record of 46–28–8 and 100 points, securing fourth place in the Pacific Division and the first playoff wild card spot in the Western Conference. During the playoffs, the Kraken faced off against the Colorado Avalanche in the first round. They upset the Avalanche in seven games, becoming the first expansion team to win their first playoff series over the defending Stanley Cup champion. However, they lost to the Dallas Stars in the second round, ending their second season. During the 2023–24 season, the team missed the playoffs, scoring only 217 goals and achieving only 81 points. This caused the Kraken to fire head coach Dave Hakstol and hire Dan Bylsma. During the 2024–25 season, the team regressed, managing only 76 points. Following the season, the Kraken once again fired their head coach, parting ways with Bylsma and hiring Lane Lambert. The team also replaced general manager Ron Francis with Jason Botterill, making Francis the Kraken's president of hockey operations. The team finished the 2025–26 season with 79 points, missing the playoffs once again.

== History ==
=== Prior to establishment ===
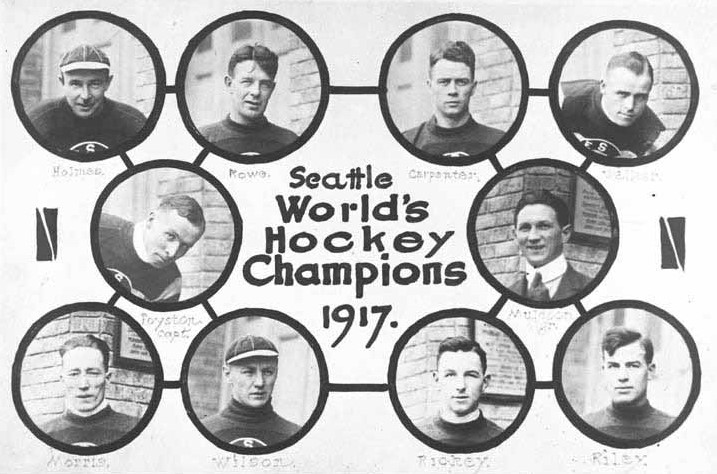
The Seattle Metropolitans were the first American team to win the Stanley Cup.

Professional ice hockey in Seattle dates to the formation of the Pacific Coast Hockey Association's Seattle Metropolitans in 1915. Although the 1917 Metropolitans were the first United States-based team to win the Stanley Cup, the team's arena was sold in 1924, and the team folded shortly thereafter. The Seattle Totems (originally the Seattle Ironmen) played in the Western Hockey League from 1944 until the league's dissolution in 1975.

Beginning in 2012, as the NHL's interest in Seattle as a market rose, the city was considered a potential site for expansion or the relocation of a team, pending a viable arena. Multiple reports suggested that the owner of the Chicago Wolves, businessman Don Levin, had expressed interest in building a new arena in nearby Bellevue that could host an NHL team.

When the San Jose Sharks' former chief executive officer (CEO), Greg Jamison, was unable to meet a deadline to purchase the Phoenix Coyotes on January 31, 2013, speculation began that the team would be relocated to Seattle. On June 16, 2013, it was confirmed that the Phoenix Coyotes would move to Seattle if an arena deal between the team and the city of Glendale, Arizona, where the team played, was not reached. Under a contingency plan, if the team could not stay in Glendale, investors Ray Bartoszek and Anthony Lanza would purchase the franchise for US$220 million and begin operations in Seattle the following season. However, no purchase needed to be made, as on July 3, 2013, the Glendale City Council narrowly voted 4–3 to keep the Coyotes in Glendale. A 2013 study by statistician Nate Silver concluded that Seattle had the largest number of avid ice hockey fans of any U.S. media market that did not have an NHL team.

=== Establishment (2017–2021) ===
On December 4, 2017, the Seattle City Council voted 7–1 to approve a memorandum of understanding between the City of Seattle and Oak View Group, a sports company co-founded by Tim Leiweke, for renovations of KeyArena. On December 7, the NHL Board of Governors agreed to consider an expansion application from Seattle with an expansion fee set at US$650 million. The Seattle ownership group was represented by David Bonderman and Jerry Bruckheimer.

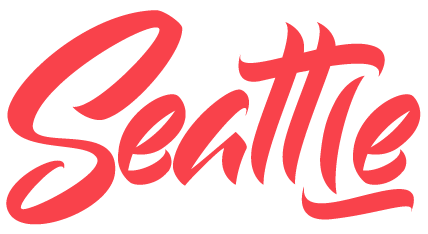
Seattle's initial wordmark used prior to the name and logo unveiling

On December 4, 2018, the NHL Board of Governors voted unanimously to approve the addition of a Seattle expansion team to the league. In mid-2019, the organization hired Ron Francis as their general manager to initiate operations for the team. Francis later stated that three things he wanted to prioritize in the Kraken's roster were speed, character, and competitiveness. In July 2020, the franchise announced their team name—the Seattle Kraken—as well as their team colors, branding, and home jersey.

On April 30, 2021, the franchise paid the final installment of the US$650 million expansion fee, officially making the Seattle Kraken the 32nd team of the NHL. The Kraken signed their first player, Luke Henman, on May 12. On June 24, the organization hired Dave Hakstol as their inaugural head coach. On July 19, a three-day period began during which the Kraken could talk to unrestricted free agents before any other team could. The Kraken used this period to sign Adam Larsson, Jamie Oleksiak, and Chris Driedger. An expansion draft was held three days later at Gas Works Park in front of more than 4,000 spectators and fans. The draft was held in a similar manner to a previous expansion draft held in 2017 for the Vegas Golden Knights, who were themselves exempt from the 2021 expansion draft. Larsson, Oleksiak, and Driedger counted as the pick from their former teams (Edmonton, Dallas, and Florida, respectively). Two days later, the first round of the 2021 NHL entry draft took place. The Kraken used their second-overall pick to select Matty Beniers, a center from the University of Michigan. The previous season, Beniers had scored 24 points throughout 24 games, and his 10 goals ranked first among goals for first-time draft-eligible NCAA players.

=== First seasons (2021–present) ===
The Kraken started their inaugural free agency on July 28, 2021, signing forwards Alexander Wennberg and Jaden Schwartz, and goaltender Philipp Grubauer. On October 11, the Kraken named Mark Giordano as the team's inaugural captain. The team also named four alternate captains: Adam Larsson, Jordan Eberle, Yanni Gourde, and Jaden Schwartz. The Kraken played their first regular season game the next day, a 4–3 loss to the Vegas Golden Knights, in which Ryan Donato scored the first goal in team history. The franchise's first win came in their next game two days later, when they defeated the Nashville Predators 4–3. The Kraken played their first home game at Climate Pledge Arena (formerly KeyArena) on October 23, a 4–2 loss to the division rival Vancouver Canucks. Prior to the game, the team retired jersey number 32, in recognition of the franchise being the 32nd to join the NHL and in honor of the 32,000 fans who placed deposits for tickets on the first possible day. The team picked up their first home win on October 26, against the Montreal Canadiens. On February 2, 2022, Grubauer recorded the franchise's first shutout, making 19 saves in a 3–0 victory against the New York Islanders. On March 20, the Kraken's captaincy became vacant after Giordano was traded to the Toronto Maple Leafs. The team was eliminated from playoff contention on March 30 following a 3–0 loss to the Golden Knights. The Kraken finished their inaugural season in last place of the Pacific Division with a record of 27–49–6. (Note: NHL teams' records are arranged win-loss-overtime loss, wins earning two points, losses zero, and overtime losses one.) Only the Arizona Coyotes finished with fewer points (57) in the Western Conference that season.

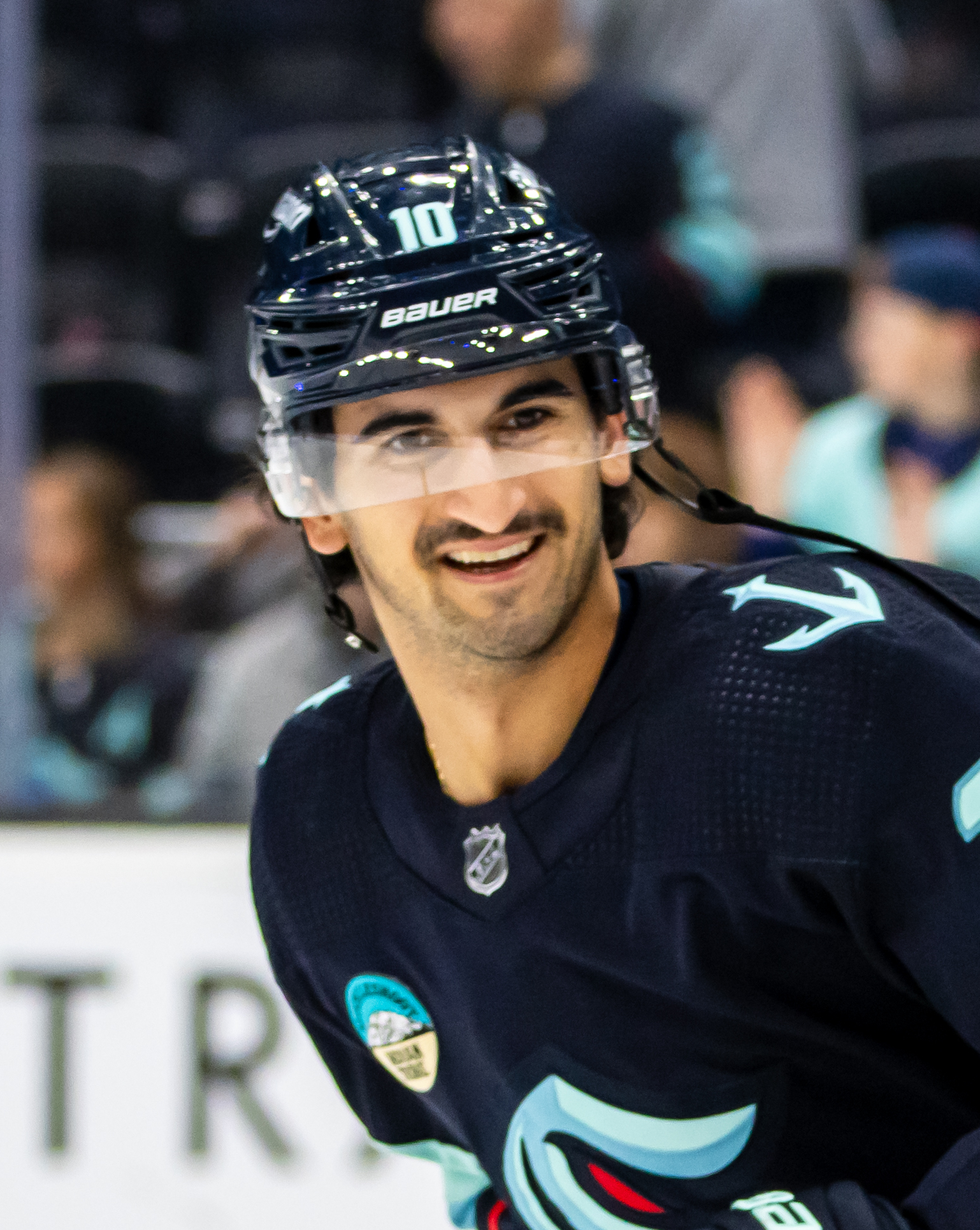
Matty Beniers, the first-ever draft pick of the Kraken, won the Calder Memorial Trophy as NHL rookie of the year at the end of the 2022–23 season.

The Kraken improved significantly in their second season. During the offseason, the team signed goaltender Martin Jones to a one-year contract. In January 2023, Jones appeared for the Kraken in seven games of an eight-game win streak. While doing so, the franchise became the first team to win all seven games of a seven-game road trip. Eventually, the Kraken clinched their first playoff berth, qualifying for the 2023 Stanley Cup playoffs. The team's record of 46–28–8 and 100 points placed the team fourth in the Pacific Division, thus achieving the first wild card playoff spot in the Western Conference. On April 30, the Kraken defeated the Colorado Avalanche in the opening best-of-seven playoff series, becoming the first expansion team in NHL history to win their first playoff series against the defending Stanley Cup champion. The team's playoff run came to an end after the second round where they lost to the Dallas Stars in seven games. On June 26, at the NHL awards ceremony, Matty Beniers was named the winner of the Calder Memorial Trophy for being the NHL rookie of the year.

During their third season, the Kraken ranked 29th in the league in goals, with only 217. In December and January, following an eight-game losing streak, goaltender Joey Daccord started in eight out of nine games of a franchise record nine-game win streak. In the midst of the streak, Daccord started in goal for the Kraken during the 2024 NHL Winter Classic, where he achieved the first-ever shutout in NHL Winter Classic history with a 3–0 victory over the Vegas Golden Knights. The team was eliminated from playoff contention on April 3, following a 5–2 loss to the Los Angeles Kings. The Kraken finished their season with a 34–35–13 record, enough for sixth place in their division. On April 29, following the end of the season, head coach Dave Hakstol was fired, being replaced by Dan Bylsma on May 28.

In July 2024, the team hired Jessica Campbell as the NHL's first female coach. In September of that year, the team promoted Justin Rogers to the role of head trainer, which made him the first openly gay man to be a head trainer in the NHL. In October, the Kraken named Jordan Eberle the second captain in franchise history. During their fourth season the Kraken missed the playoffs for a second consecutive season with a 35–41–6 record, finishing seventh in their division. On April 21, following the end of the season, head coach Dan Bylsma was fired after one season with the team. A day later the team announced that general manager Ron Francis was being promoted to president of hockey operations and that the team had hired Jason Botterill to take over as general manager. The team hired Lane Lambert as their third head coach on May 29. However, the Kraken still struggled during the 2025–26 season, finishing with a record of 34–37–11 for 79 points, placing sixth in their division.

== Arena ==
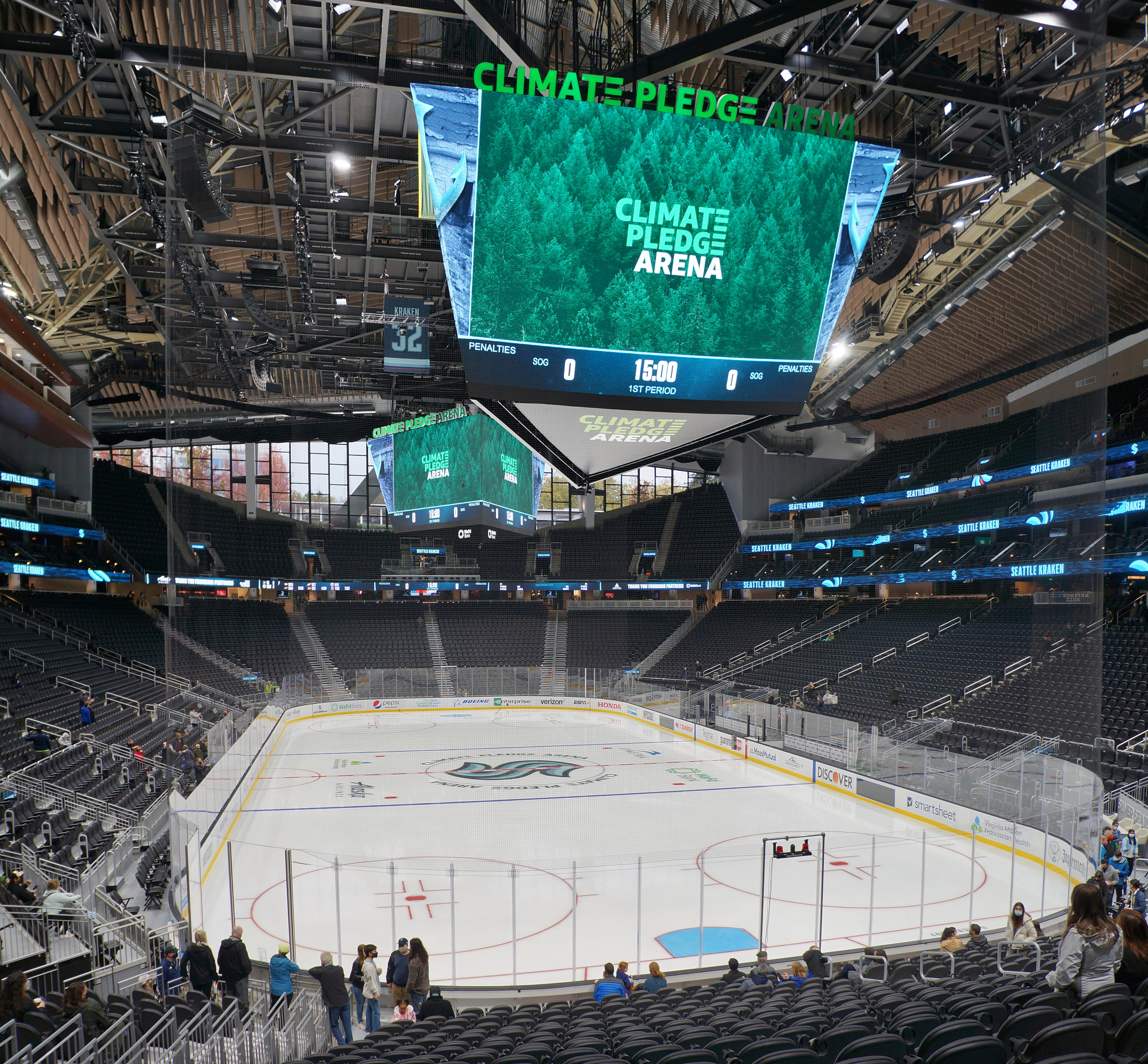
Interior view of Climate Pledge Arena, the team's home venue, during a public open house

The Kraken play their home games at Climate Pledge Arena. The arena, at the Seattle Center, is a renovation of the former KeyArena. On June 25, 2020, Amazon bought the naming rights to KeyArena and renamed the venue due to their environmental goals. The venue has 17,151 seats in its ice hockey configuration. Vince Dunn scored the first Kraken goal in the arena's history on October 23, 2021. The Kraken's first shutout win at home was a 3–0 victory over the San Jose Sharks on April 29, 2022, the final home game of their inaugural season.

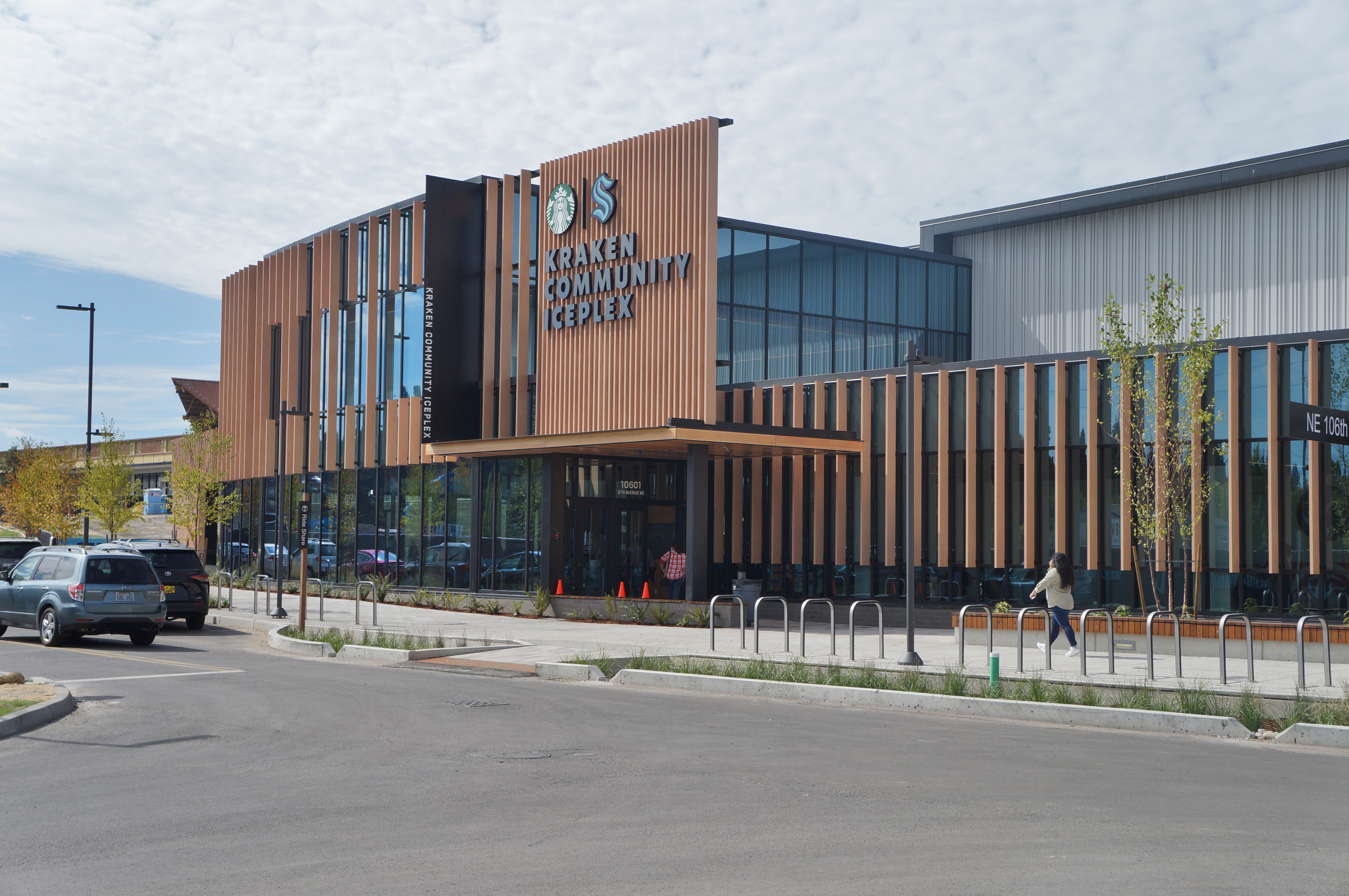
Exterior view of the Kraken Community Iceplex in Northgate, the team's training facility

The team's primary practice facility, named the Kraken Community Iceplex, is located at Northgate Station (formerly Northgate Mall) and was opened in September 2021. The facility has three rinks and is open to the public. In 2024, a second community ice rink was proposed for a former park and ride lot in Kirkland on the Eastside. The city government approved a development partnership and 34-year land lease with the Kraken in December 2025. The Kirkland facility, planned to comprise two full rinks, a community center, restaurant, and team store, is expected to open in late 2027.

The Kraken's three home preseason games prior to the 2021–22 season were held at Spokane Arena in Spokane, Angel of the Winds Arena in Everett, and the accesso ShoWare Center in Kent: arenas home to Western Hockey League (WHL) teams, in an event known as the 3-Rink Rush, due to delays in the renovation of Climate Pledge Arena.

=== Arena entertainment ===
The Kraken's goal horn is from the ferry boat MV Hyak. The team plays the Nirvana song "Lithium" after every Kraken goal at home; the song was chosen due to Nirvana's importance to Seattle grunge culture.

Starting with their first win at home against the Montreal Canadiens on October 26, 2021, the Kraken feature a unique postgame tradition during the "Three Stars of the Game" ceremony. Instead of the honored players tossing conventional souvenir pucks or sticks to the fans, they throw a plush toy salmon into the crowd to mimic Seattle's Pike Place Market fish toss and to honor the significance of wild-caught salmon to the state of Washington.

Rod Masters, the organist from the 1977 film Slap Shot, became the organist for the Kraken starting with the team's home game against the New York Islanders on January 1, 2022. As Climate Pledge Arena does not have an organ, Masters played music using electronic keyboards. Masters retired after the 2021–22 season, and the Kraken hired 29-year-old Ben Wooley, who is still the team's organist.

== Team identity ==
=== Logo and uniforms ===
On July 23, 2020, the team held an event to reveal their team branding. The franchise's promotional materials state that the team's "Kraken" name was adopted to honor the maritime culture of Seattle. The Pacific Northwest region also has a history of Scandinavian immigrants and ancestry, further connecting Seattle to the Nordic origin of the "Kraken" mythology. The colors chosen for the team's logo were ice blue, boundless blue, shadow blue, and red alert. The team's logo furthermore also contains a red eye and a tentacle. For the team's jerseys, deep sea blue served as the base color with the logo's colors as accent colors. Kraken players first wore the uniforms at the 2021 NHL expansion draft.

On October 20, 2022, the Kraken unveiled their "Reverse Retro" uniform for the 2022–23 season, featuring an ice blue base with deep sea blue striping. The design was a callback to the Seattle Ironmen, a defunct Pacific Coast Hockey League (PCHL) team that existed in the 1940s.

For the 2024 NHL Winter Classic, the Kraken wore a uniform inspired by the Seattle Metropolitans, a former Stanley Cup-competing team which won the championship in 1917. The deep sea blue uniform features a red "S" similar to the Metropolitans' crest, but shaped to the current "S" logo of the Kraken, with the team name written inside. Ice blue, vintage white and deep sea blue stripes were added to the body and sleeves. The uniform was officially unveiled on November 22, 2023, but was leaked four days earlier when players from the National Basketball Association's Utah Jazz walked into their home arena wearing it.

On September 4, 2025, the Kraken unveiled their first alternate uniform. The black-based set featured glow-in-the-dark elements as a nod to bioluminescence, along with sonar-inspired stripes on the sleeves and socks, and a glow-in-the-dark Muckleshoot Indian Tribe patch. Both the Kraken logo and numbers are in black with glow-in-the-dark trim.

=== Mascot ===
Buoy, a sea troll, is the Kraken's mascot. He is a reference to and is based on the Fremont Troll. Buoy was introduced prior to a preseason home game against the Vancouver Canucks on October 1, 2022. The Kraken had intended to introduce Buoy around Christmas during the 2021–22 season, but due to game postponements related to the spread of the SARS-CoV-2 Omicron variant, the team decided to wait until prior to the 2022–23 season instead.

During the 2021–22 season, in the absence of an official mascot, the Kraken promoted a "team dog" named Davy Jones. The dog, a four-month-old husky mix rescue dog introduced on January 17, 2022, socialized with fans at home games as he trained to be a therapy dog.

== Broadcasting ==
=== Television ===
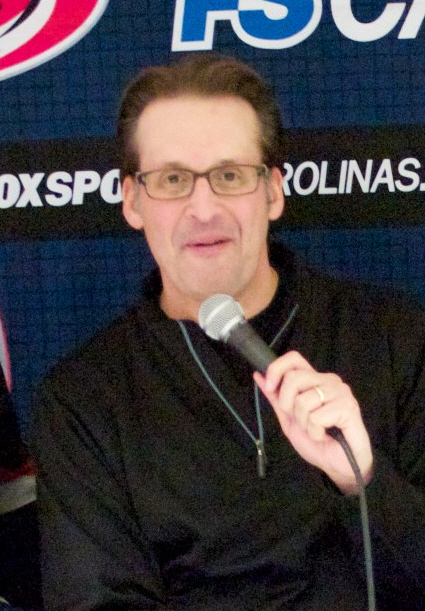
John Forslund has been the Kraken's play-by-play announcer for all of the team's seasons.

Kraken games are televised through the Kraken Hockey Network (KHN), which includes over-the-air television stations in Seattle (KING-TV and KONG), Spokane (KREM and KSKN), and Yakima (KAPP and KVEW), Washington; Eugene (KEVU and KLSR-TV) and Portland (KGW), Oregon; Anchorage (KAUU) and Juneau (KYEX-LD), Alaska; and Boise (KTVB) and Twin Falls (KTFT), Idaho. Games can also be streamed locally on Amazon Prime Video. Games were televised regionally on Root Sports Northwest for the team's first three seasons.

Former Hartford Whalers and Carolina Hurricanes broadcaster John Forslund is the Kraken's television play-by-play announcer, and J. T. Brown is the team's primary television color commentator. In August 2022, the team hired Eddie Olczyk to be a television analyst alongside Forslund and Brown.

The television broadcast for the Kraken's February 17, 2022, game against the Winnipeg Jets featured Everett Fitzhugh as play-by-play announcer and Brown as color commentator, making up the first all-Black broadcast duo in NHL history.

=== Radio ===
Kraken games are broadcast on KJR-FM 93.3 and KJR 950 AM, the flagship stations of the Kraken Audio Network. During a schedule conflict, some games may be heard on 96.5 KJAQ. The Kraken Audio Network also includes several other stations outside Seattle.

Everett Fitzhugh serves as the team's primary radio play-by-play announcer. He is the first Black full-time play-by-play announcer in NHL history. Former NHL player and Vancouver Canucks broadcaster Dave Tomlinson served as Fitzhugh's color commentator before resigning in August 2023 to take a new broadcasting job in Canada. The Kraken then hired former Seattle Thunderbirds forward and Everett Silvertips commentator Al Kinisky to replace him. Mike Benton is the studio host for all radio broadcasts, serving pre-game, intermission, and post-game coverage.

== Minor league affiliates ==
The Kraken maintain affiliations with minor league teams for player development. The Kraken's primary affiliate plays in the American Hockey League (AHL), which feeds directly into the NHL. The team also has an affiliate in the ECHL, which exists a tier below in the development system.

=== American Hockey League ===
The Coachella Valley Firebirds, the AHL affiliate of the Kraken, are based in Thousand Palms, California. After the Kraken were approved into the NHL by the Board of Governors, the team's ownership group began making plans to acquire a minor league affiliate in the AHL. By early 2019, they had narrowed it down to promoting the ECHL's Idaho Steelheads in Boise, Idaho, or a new expansion team near Palm Springs, California. On June 26, 2019, it was reported the Seattle ownership group had chosen Palm Springs as the site for Seattle's AHL affiliate. The expansion franchise was approved by the AHL Board of Governors on September 30, 2019, with plans to begin play in the 2021–22 season. Delays associated with the construction of an arena in the Palm Springs area caused the team's debut to be pushed back to the 2022–23 season. On November 5, 2021, the new team revealed its name, the Coachella Valley Firebirds, as well as its logos and colors, at a ceremony held on the construction site of their new arena.

As the Firebirds were not ready for the 2021–22 season, Seattle affiliated with the Charlotte Checkers, sharing the team with the Florida Panthers. After clinching their division, the Checkers advanced to the division finals of the 2022 Calder Cup playoffs, where they lost to the Springfield Thunderbirds.

During their inaugural 2022–23 season, pending construction of their arena, the Firebirds started a series of games in Seattle and Everett, playing games against the Abbotsford Canucks and the Calgary Wranglers at the Iceplex as well as Climate Pledge Arena and Angel of the Winds Arena in October 2022. Two of the four games were played at the Iceplex, the first resulting in a 4–3 loss to the Canucks and the second a 5–3 win over the Wranglers. The Firebirds' arena, named Acrisure Arena, was completed on December 14. Over both that season and the next, the Firebirds went on to reach the Calder Cup finals.

=== ECHL ===
For their inaugural season, the Kraken's ECHL affiliate was the Texas-based Allen Americans. They were replaced by the Kansas City Mavericks in that capacity, starting from the 2022–23 season.

== Season-by-season record ==
This is a partial list of the last five seasons completed by the Kraken.

Note: GP = Games played, W = Wins, L = Losses, OTL = Overtime/shootout losses, Pts = Points, GF = Goals for, GA = Goals against

List of Seattle Kraken seasons
Season	GP	W	L	OTL	Pts	GF	GA	Finish	Playoffs
2021–22	82	27	49	6	60	216	285	8th, Pacific	Did not qualify
2022–23	82	46	28	8	100	289	256	4th, Pacific	Lost in second round, 3–4 (Stars)
2023–24	82	34	35	13	81	217	236	6th, Pacific	Did not qualify
2024–25	82	35	41	6	76	247	265	7th, Pacific	Did not qualify
2025–26	82	34	37	11	79	226	263	6th, Pacific	Did not qualify

== Players and personnel ==
=== Current roster ===
Updated November 2, 2026

No.	Nat	Player	Pos	S/G	Age	Acquired	Birthplace
10	(United States)	Matty Beniers (A)	C	L	24	2021	Hingham, Massachusetts
27	(Canada)	Berkly Catton	C	L	20	2024	Saskatoon, Saskatchewan
35	(United States)	Joey Daccord	G	L	30	2021	Boston, Massachusetts
42	(Canada)	Curtis Douglas	C	L	26	2026	Oakville, Ontario
29	(Canada)	Vince Dunn (A)	D	L	30	2021	Mississauga, Ontario
7	(Canada)	Jordan Eberle (C)	RW	R	36	2021	Regina, Saskatchewan
41	(Canada)	Ryker Evans	D	L	24	2021	Calgary, Alberta
8	(Canada)	Cale Fleury	D	R	27	2021	Carlyle, Saskatchewan
89	(Canada)	Frédérick Gaudreau	C	R	33	2025	Bromont, Quebec
31	(Germany)	Philipp Grubauer	G	L	34	2021	Rosenheim, Germany
84	(Finland)	Kaapo Kakko	RW	L	25	2024	Turku, Finland
6	(Sweden)	Adam Larsson (A)	D	R	33	2021	Skellefteå, Sweden
55	(United States)	Ryan Lindgren	D	L	28	2025	Minneapolis, Minnesota
28	(Canada)	Josh Mahura	D	L	28	2024	St. Albert, Alberta
19	(Canada)	Jared McCann	C	L	30	2021	Stratford, Ontario
74	(Canada)	Bobby McMann	C	L	30	2026	Wainwright, Alberta
63	(Canada)	Jacob Melanson	RW	R	23	2021	Amherst, Nova Scotia
59	(United States)	Ben Meyers	C	L	27	2024	Delano, Minnesota
62	(Canada)	Brandon Montour (A)	D	R	32	2024	Ohsweken, Ontario
38	(Finland)	Jani Nyman	RW	L	22	2022	Valkeakoski, Finland
46	(Finland)	Ville Ottavainen	D	L	24	2024	Oulu, Finland
11	(United States)	Mackie Samoskevich	RW	R	23	2026	Newtown, Connecticut
9	(Canada)	Chandler Stephenson	C	L	32	2024	Saskatoon, Saskatchewan
26	(Canada)	Ryan Winterton	C	R	23	2021	Markham, Ontario
71	(Canada)	Matthew Wood	RW	R	21	2026	Nanaimo, British Columbia

=== Owners ===
The Kraken are owned by Seattle Hockey Partners, an organization led by Jerry Bruckheimer, Tod Leiweke, and Samantha Holloway, daughter of original team founder David Bonderman. Other members of the ownership group include Adrian Hanauer (the majority owner of Seattle Sounders FC), Amazon CEO Andy Jassy, and Tim Leiweke. In 2022, former Seattle Seahawks running back Marshawn Lynch and rapper Macklemore joined the partnership as minority owners. In 2026, philanthropist Melinda French Gates joined as a minority owner of the team.

=== Head coaches ===
- Dave Hakstol, 2021–2024
- Dan Bylsma, 2024–2025
- Lane Lambert, since 2025

=== General managers ===
- Ron Francis, 2019–2025
- Jason Botterill, since 2025

=== Other personnel ===
- Ron Francis, since 2025, president of hockey operations

=== Team captains ===
- Mark Giordano, 2021–2022
- Jordan Eberle, 2024–present

=== Retired numbers ===
- 32 was retired on October 23, 2021, to honor the fans for 32,000 ticket deposits in one day and for being the NHL's newest – 32nd – team. (Note: This also reflects a Seattle tradition, with the Seattle Seahawks of the National Football League having previously retired the number 12 to honor their fans, referred to as the 12th Man by the team.)
- 99 was retired by the NHL for all its member teams in honor of Wayne Gretzky at the 2000 National Hockey League All-Star Game.

== Team and league awards ==
=== League awards ===
Matty Beniers won the Calder Memorial Trophy at the end of the Kraken's second season after leading all rookies in points, with 57, and tying for the lead in goals among rookies, with 24.

Calder Memorial Trophy

- 2022–23: Matty Beniers

=== Team awards ===
The Kraken have four player awards that are given after each season. The Kraken's most valuable player, as voted on by Seattle-area media, receives the Pete Muldoon Award. The player with the most mentions in the Three Stars of the Game ceremony of each Kraken home game, computed using a points system, wins the Three Stars of the Year Award. The Guyle Fielder Award goes to the teammate who best exemplifies "perseverance, hustle, and dedication" as voted upon by their teammates and coaches. The Fan Favorite Award goes to a player who wins a fan vote.

== Franchise records ==
=== Scoring leaders ===
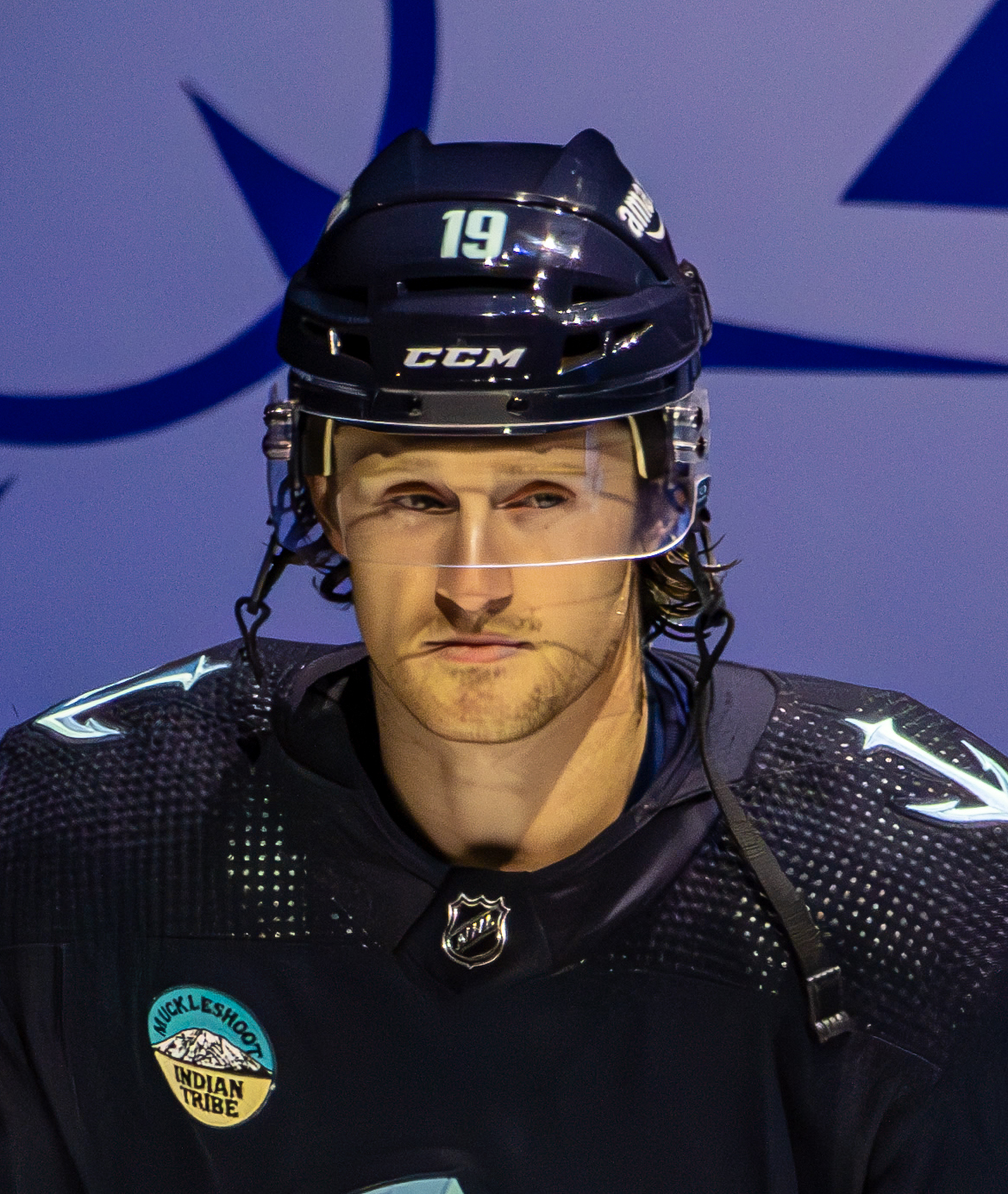
Jared McCann leads the Kraken all-time in goals and points.

These are the top-ten point-scorers in franchise history. Figures are updated after each completed NHL regular season.

- * – current Kraken player

Note: Pos = Position; GP = Games played; G = Goals; A = Assists; Pts = Points; P/G = Points per game

Points
Player	Pos	GP	G	A	Pts	P/G
Jared McCann*	C	367	138	145	283	.77
Jordan Eberle*	RW	361	93	139	232	.64
Vince Dunn*	D	356	54	174	228	.64
Matty Beniers*	C	331	82	114	196	.59
Jaden Schwartz	LW	301	79	89	168	.56
Yanni Gourde	C	271	52	94	146	.54
Oliver Bjorkstrand	RW	224	56	85	141	.63
Eeli Tolvanen*	RW	288	67	72	139	.48
Adam Larsson*	D	409	34	95	129	.32
Chandler Stephenson*	C	158	29	71	100	.63
Alexander Wennberg	C	222	33	67	100	.45

Goals
Player	Pos	G
Jared McCann*	C	138
Jordan Eberle*	RW	93
Matty Beniers*	C	82
Jaden Schwartz	LW	79
Eeli Tolvanen*	RW	67
Oliver Bjorkstrand	RW	56
Vince Dunn*	D	54
Yanni Gourde	C	52
Brandon Tanev	LW	41
Shane Wright*	C	36

Assists
Player	Pos	A
Vince Dunn*	D	174
Jared McCann*	C	145
Jordan Eberle*	RW	139
Matty Beniers*	C	114
Adam Larsson*	D	95
Yanni Gourde	C	94
Jaden Schwartz	LW	89
Oliver Bjorkstrand	RW	85
Eeli Tolvanen*	RW	72
Chandler Stephenson*	C	71

=== Goaltending leaders ===
These are the top-ten goaltenders in franchise history by wins. Figures are updated after each completed NHL regular season.

- * – current Kraken player

Note: GP = Games played; W = Wins; L = Losses; T/O = Ties/Overtime losses; GA = Goal against; GAA = Goals against average; SA = Shots against; SV% = Save percentage; SO = Shutouts

Goaltenders
Player	GP	W	L	T/O	GA	GAA	SA	SV%	SO
Philipp Grubauer*	188	70	90	16	521	3.00	4,897	.894	4
Joey Daccord*	164	68	66	23	437	2.80	4,550	.905	7
Martin Jones	48	27	13	3	131	2.99	1,145	.887	3
Chris Driedger	29	10	15	1	78	2.93	782	.900	1
Nikke Kokko*	4	1	2	0	11	3.18	88	.875	0
Matt Murray*	5	0	2	1	8	2.21	102	.922	0
Victor Östman*	2	0	1	0	2	1.56	47	.957	0
Aleš Stezka	1	0	1	0	3	3.09	23	.870	0
