= Sobotka (disambiguation) =

Sobotka or Sobótka may refer to:

== Places ==
- Sobotka, a town in the Czech Republic
- Sobótka, a town in Lower Silesian Voivodeship, south-west Poland
  - Gmina Sobótka, a district for which the above Sobótka is the administrative seat
- Sobótka, Podlaskie Voivodeship, a village in north-east Poland
- Sobótka, Opatów County, a village in Świętokrzyskie Voivodeship, south-central Poland
- Sobótka, Skarżysko County, a village in Świętokrzyskie Voivodeship, south-central Poland
- Sobótka, Koło County, a village in Greater Poland Voivodeship, central Poland
- Sobótka, Gmina Ostrów Wielkopolski, a village in Greater Poland Voivodeship, west-central Poland
- Subotica, a city and municipality in northern Serbia, called Sobotka during Ottoman rule

== Other ==
- Sobotka (surname), a Czech surname
- Śląski Kwartalnik Historyczny Sobótka, a Polish scholarly journal

== See also ==
- Sobottka, a German surname
