= Sobota =

Sobota (lit. 'Saturday' in various Slavic languages) may refer to:

== Places ==
- Sobota, Łódź Voivodeship, a village in central Poland
- Sobota, Lower Silesian Voivodeship, a village in south-west Poland
- Sobota, Greater Poland Voivodeship, a village in west-central Poland
- Murska Sobota, a town in Slovenia
- Rimavská Sobota, a town in Slovakia
- Spišská Sobota, a former town in Slovakia, now part of Poprad

== People ==
Sobota (Czech and Slovak feminine: Sobotová) is a Czech, Slovak and Polish surname. Notable people with the surname include:

- Jan Sobota (1939–2012), Czech-Swiss fine bookbinder
- Kamil Sobota (born 1992), Romanian rugby union football player
- Luděk Sobota (born 1943), Czech comedian and actor
- Waldemar Sobota (born 1987), Polish futsal player and footballer

== Films ==
- Sobota (film), a 1945 Czechoslovak drama, known in English as Saturday

== See also ==
- Sobotka (disambiguation)
