= Al the Octopus =

Detroit Red Wings mascot

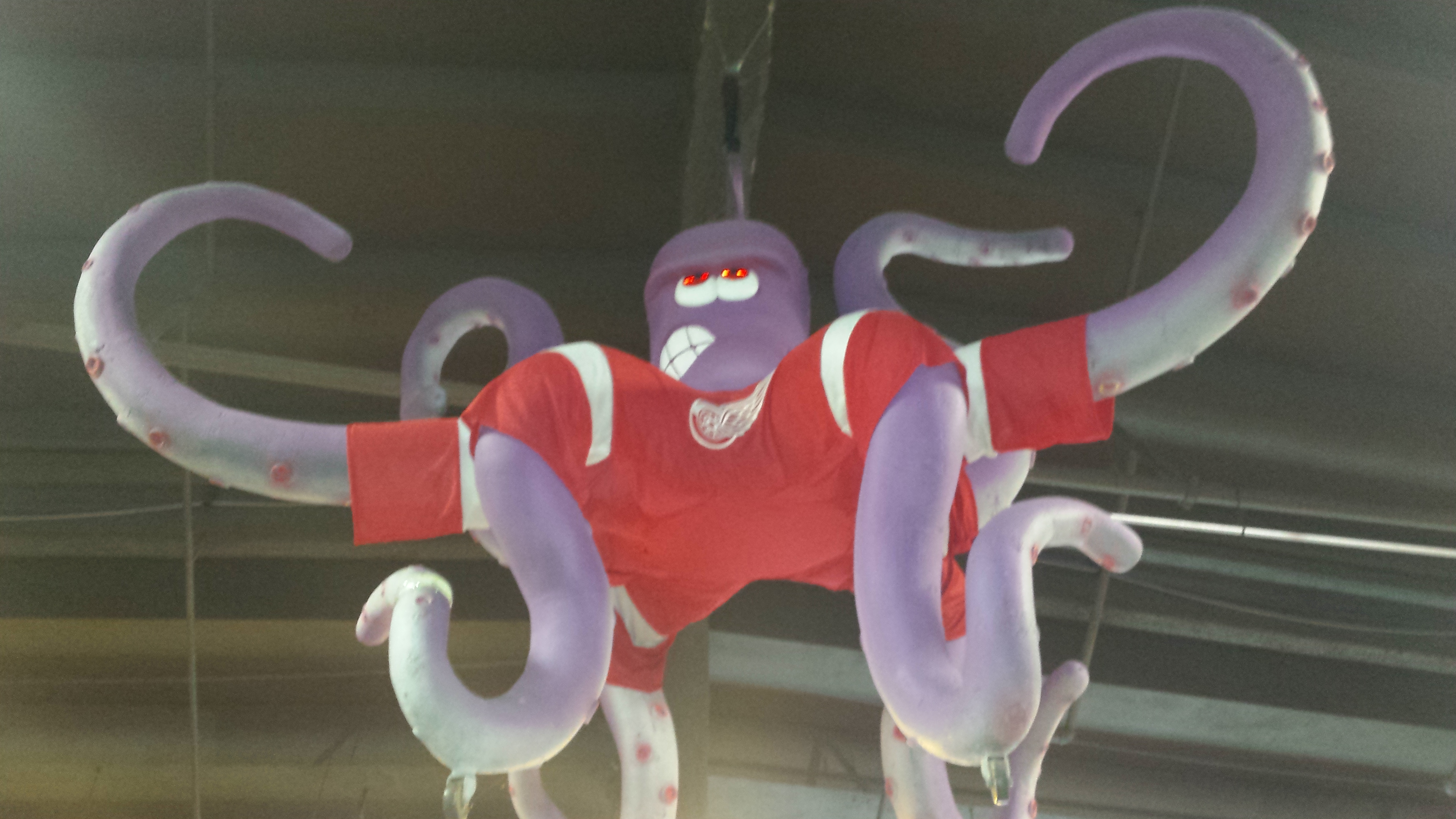
Al the Octopus in 2016

Al the Octopus is the mascot of the Detroit Red Wings of the National Hockey League. During many games, octopuses are thrown onto the ice by fans for good luck, this usually occurring after the national anthem is sung or after a goal is scored.

This Legend of the Octopus tradition, started on April 15, 1952, when two brothers, Pete and Jerry Cusimano, who owned a fish market, decided to throw an octopus onto the ice at Olympia Stadium, with the eight tentacles of the octopus symbolizing the eight wins it took to win the Stanley Cup at the time. The Red Wings were a perfect 7–0 in the playoffs and were one win away from not only winning the Cup, but becoming the first perfect team in the NHL's post season history. Sure enough the Red Wings won that game, and the media made mention of the octopus "omen" in the papers the following day, thus establishing the octopus legend in the process. Fans have been throwing octopuses onto the ice at Red Wings games ever since. The tradition died down somewhat in the 1970s and 1980s during the Red Wings dismal seasons, but when the Red Wings became contenders again in the 1990s, the tradition resumed.

Eventually, a drawn purple octopus mascot was created, and in the 1995 playoffs a large Octopus prop was unveiled. The Octopus was eventually named "Al" (after former Joe Louis Arena and Little Caesars Arena building operations manager Al Sobotka), and every playoff year since, Al the Octopus gets raised to the rafters, when the Red Wings skate out onto the ice. As the years went on some modifications were made to Al, such as making it so his pupils light up red (blinking on and off), the adding of a large Red Wing Jersey to his body, and the removal of a tooth in order to give Al that "hockey player" look. Al often appears on Red Wings apparel and promotional items. Coca-Cola would later create stuffed Als, in their Fan in the Can or Al in the Can promotion. The promotion featured cases of Coke in which some cans were, in fact, containers holding the stuffed Al. Later, Michigan stores would carry the doll, and it would be sold via a mail-in.

There have been many other types of Al merchandise, such as stickers, inflatable dolls, and decals. During the 1996 playoff year, a CD called A Call to Arms was released featuring Al on the cover. Being an octopus, Al's jersey number is 8.

Despite all this, there is no costumed Al mascot, perhaps due to the impracticality of such a suit, combined with the lateness of Al's adoption. Detroit remains one of very few hockey, and indeed American sports, teams without a suited mascot to rally fans.

== See also ==
- List of National Hockey League mascots
