= Legend of the Octopus =

Ice hockey tradition in Detroit

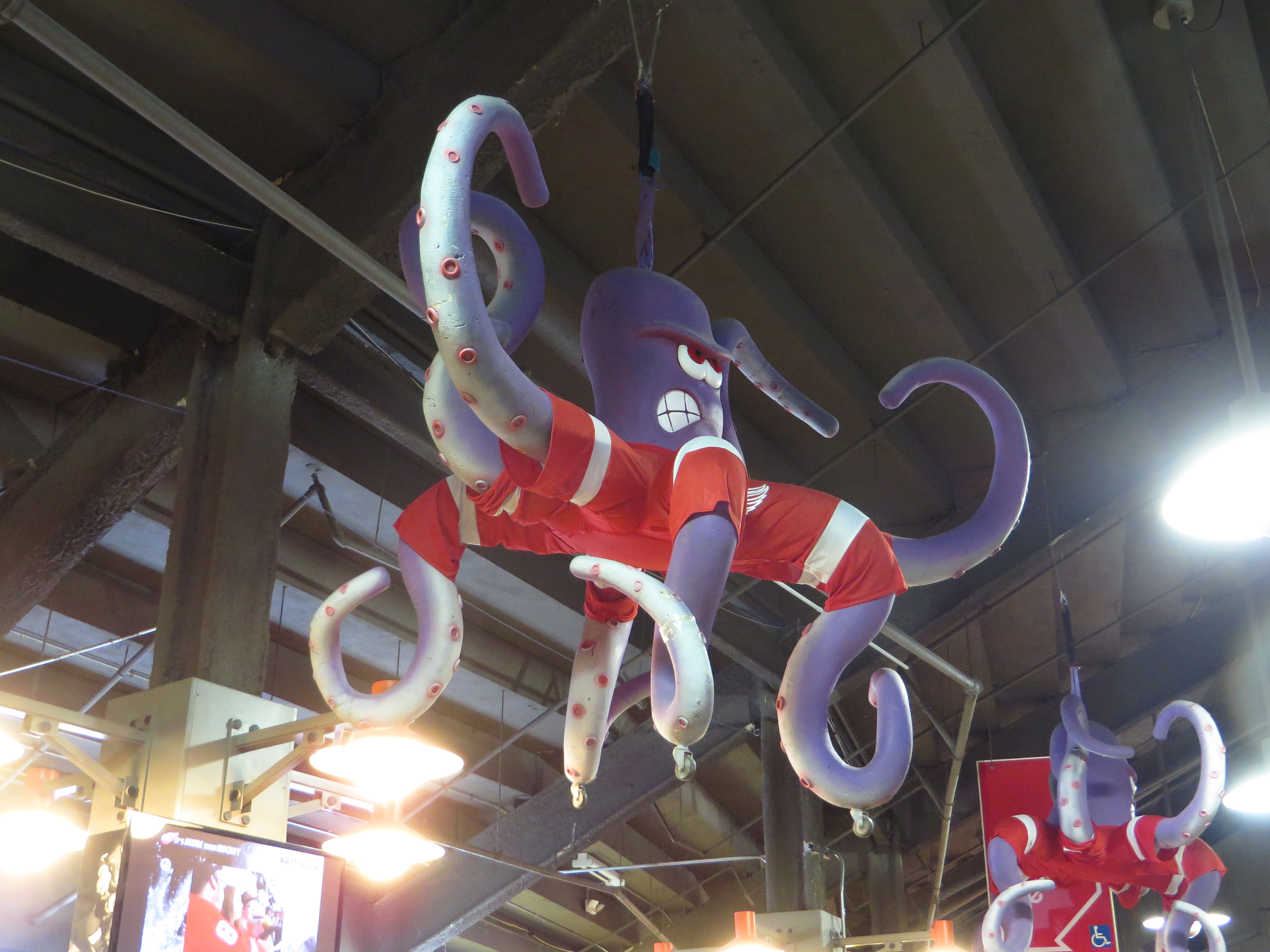
Al the Octopus, the mascot of the Detroit Red Wings, was inspired by the Legend of the Octopus

The Legend of the Octopus is a sports tradition during Detroit Red Wings home playoff games involving dead octopuses thrown onto the ice rink. The origins of the activity dates back to the 1952 playoffs when a National Hockey League team played two best-of-seven series to capture the Stanley Cup.

== History ==
The tradition started on April 15, 1952, when Pete and Jerry Cusimano, brothers and storeowners in Detroit's Eastern Market, hurled an octopus into the rink of Olympia Stadium. Having eight arms, the octopus symbolized the number of playoff wins the Red Wings needed to win the Stanley Cup at the time. The team would go on to sweep the Toronto Maple Leafs and Montreal Canadiens en route to winning the championship.

Since then, the tradition has persisted with each passing year. In one 1995 game, fans threw 36 octopuses, including a specimen weighing 38 pounds (17 kg). The Red Wings' unofficial mascot is a purple octopus named Al, and during playoff runs, two of these mascots were also hung from the rafters of Joe Louis Arena, symbolizing the 16 wins now needed to take home the Stanley Cup. The practice has become such an accepted part of the team's lore, fans have developed various techniques and "octopus etiquette" for launching the creatures onto the ice.

On October 4, 1987, the last day of the regular Major League Baseball season, an octopus was thrown on the field in the top of the seventh inning at Tiger Stadium in Detroit as the Tigers defeated the Toronto Blue Jays, 1–0, clinching the American League East division championship. In May of that year, the Red Wings had defeated the Toronto Maple Leafs in the Stanley Cup playoffs.

At the final game at Joe Louis Arena, 35 octopuses were thrown onto the ice.

=== Twirling ban ===
Al Sobotka, the former head ice manager at Little Caesars Arena and one of the two Zamboni drivers, was the person who retrieved the thrown octopuses from the ice. When the Red Wings played at Joe Louis Arena, he was known to twirl an octopus above his head as he walked across the ice rink to the Zamboni entrance. On April 19, 2008, the NHL sent the Red Wings a memo that forbade this and imposed a $10,000 fine for violating the mandate. In an email to the Detroit Free Press, NHL spokesman Frank Brown justified the ban because matter flew off the octopus and got on the ice when Sobotka swung it above his head. In an article describing the effects of the new rule, the Detroit Free Press dubbed the NHL's prohibition as "Octopus-gate". By the beginning of the third round of the 2008 Playoffs, the NHL loosened the ban to allow for the octopus twirling to take place at the Zamboni entrance.

== Events inspired by the octopus ==
The octopus tradition inspired several other creature and object tossing moments:

During Game 3 of the 1995 Stanley Cup Finals at Brendan Byrne Arena between the Red Wings and the New Jersey Devils, Devils fans threw a lobster, a dead fish, and other objects onto the ice.

Nashville Predators fans throw catfish onto their home ice. The first recorded instance occurred during a game between the Red Wings and the Predators on January 26, 1999. It was done in response to the Red Wings' tradition.

In the 2006 Stanley Cup playoffs, during the opening-round series between the Red Wings and the Edmonton Oilers, two Edmonton radio hosts threw Alberta Beef onto the ice. Oilers fans continued throwing steaks, even at away games, which ultimately resulted in one of the hosts being arrested and charged with a misdemeanor while attending Game 1 of the Stanley Cup Finals at the RBC Center.

During Game 4 of the 2007 Stanley Cup Western Conference Semifinals between the Red Wings and the San Jose Sharks, a Sharks fan threw a four-foot leopard shark onto the ice at the HP Pavilion at San Jose after the Sharks scored their first goal with two minutes left in the first period.

During the 2008 Stanley Cup Finals, in which the Red Wings defeated the Pittsburgh Penguins, seafood wholesalers in Pittsburgh, led by Wholey's Fish Market, began requiring identification from customers who purchased octopuses, refusing to sell to buyers from Michigan. This also took place in the lead up to the 2017 Stanley Cup Finals with markets refusing to sell catfish to Tennessee residents.

In Game 1 of the 2010 Western Conference Quarterfinals between the Detroit Red Wings and the Phoenix Coyotes, a rubber snake was thrown onto the ice after a goal by the Coyotes' Keith Yandle.

In Game 2 of the 2010 Western Conference Semifinals between the Red Wings and San Jose Sharks, a small shark was tossed onto the ice with an octopus inside its mouth.

== See also ==
- Al the Octopus
- Detroit Red Wings
- Stanley Cup
- Rat trick
