= Bruce Martyn =

American sportscaster (born 1929)

- Born: June 24, 1929 (age 97); Sault Ste. Marie, Michigan
- Occupation: Broadcaster
- Years active: 1950–1995, 1997
- Awards: Foster Hewitt Memorial Award (1991)

Bruce Martyn (born June 24, 1929) is a former American sportscaster. He is best known for being the radio voice of the Detroit Red Wings from 1964 to 1995.

After attending what is now known as Lake Superior State University and later dropping out of the University of Michigan, Martyn returned to his hometown of Sault Ste. Marie, Michigan to begin his broadcasting career at WSOO-AM in 1950 doing play-by-play for the Sault Ste. Marie Indians of the Northern Ontario Hockey Association.

In 1953, Martyn moved to Pontiac where he worked as a morning disc jockey and the sports director at WCAR-AM. During this time, Martyn also announced games for Michigan State Spartans football, the Detroit Pistons and Detroit Lions. After ten years, he moved to TV and the UHF station WKBD-TV in Detroit to be the sports director.

It did not take long for Martyn to be discovered by the Red Wings, who offered him a job broadcasting home and away games in 1964. Martyn served the team for 31 years, most partnered with NHL icon Sid Abel. He became best known for the phrase, "He shoots, he scores!"

Martyn retired after the 1994–95 season, but returned in 1997 to call the second period of the team's Stanley Cup clincher. He was presented with the Foster Hewitt Memorial Award for broadcasting by the Hockey Hall of Fame in Toronto in 1991 and inducted into the Michigan Sports Hall of Fame in 1996. He is a Lifetime Honorary Members and a past President of the Detroit Sports Media Association.

== Sources ==
- Detroit Sports Broadcasters Association
- Michigan Sports Hall of Fame
