= Detroit Red Wings =

National Hockey League team in Detroit, Michigan

- 2026–27 Detroit Red Wings season
- Conference: Eastern
- Division: Atlantic
- Founded: 1926
- History: Detroit Cougars; 1926–1930; Detroit Falcons; 1930–1932; Detroit Red Wings; 1932–present
- Home arena: Little Caesars Arena
- City: Detroit, Michigan
- Team colors: Red, white
- Media: Detroit SportsNet; 97.1 The Ticket
- Owner: Ilitch Holdings, Inc.
- General manager: Shawn Horcoff (interim)
- Head coach: Todd McLellan
- Captain: Vacant
- Minor league affiliates: Grand Rapids Griffins (AHL); Toledo Walleye (ECHL)
- Stanley Cups: 11 (1935–36, 1936–37, 1942–43, 1949–50, 1951–52, 1953–54, 1954–55, 1996–97, 1997–98, 2001–02, 2007–08)
- Conference championships: 6 (1994–95, 1996–97, 1997–98, 2001–02, 2007–08, 2008–09)
- Presidents' Trophies: 6 (1994–95, 1995–96, 2001–02, 2003–04, 2005–06, 2007–08)
- Division championships: 19 (1933–34, 1935–36, 1936–37, 1987–88, 1988–89, 1991–92, 1993–94, 1994–95, 1995–96, 1998–99, 2000–01, 2001–02, 2002–03, 2003–04, 2005–06, 2006–07, 2007–08, 2008–09, 2010–11)
- Official website: nhl.com/redwings

The Detroit Red Wings (colloquially referred to as the Wings) are a professional ice hockey team based in Detroit. The Red Wings compete in the National Hockey League (NHL) as a member of the Atlantic Division in the Eastern Conference. The franchise is one of the "Original Six" teams. Founded in 1926, the team was known as the Detroit Cougars until 1930. For the next two seasons, the team was named the Detroit Falcons, before changing their name to the Red Wings in 1932.

The Red Wings have won the most Stanley Cup championships of any NHL franchise based in the United States (11), and are third overall amongst active teams in total Stanley Cup championships, behind the Montreal Canadiens (24) and Toronto Maple Leafs (13). The Wings played their home games at Joe Louis Arena from 1979 until 2017, after playing for 52 years at Olympia Stadium. They moved into Little Caesars Arena beginning with the 2017–18 season. The Red Wings are one of the most popular and successful franchises in the NHL; fans and sports commentators refer to the Detroit area as "Hockeytown", which has been a registered trademark owned by the franchise since 1996.

Between the 1931–32 and 1965–66 seasons, the Red Wings missed the playoffs only four times. They struggled between the 1966–67 and 1982–83 seasons, only making the playoffs twice in that stretch. After that, however, from 1983–84 to 2015–16, they made the playoffs 30 times in 32 seasons, including 25 straight from 1990–91 to 2015–16 (not including the canceled 2004–05 season); in 2006, this became the longest active streak of postseason appearances in all of North American professional sports and finished tied for the third-longest streak in NHL history. Since 1983–84, the Red Wings have tallied six regular season first-place finishes and have won the Stanley Cup four times (1997, 1998, 2002, and 2008). However, since the final season of their playoff streak in 2015–16, the Red Wings have failed to qualify for the playoffs in each of the past ten seasons, which currently stands as the longest active drought in the league.

== History ==
=== Early years (1926–1949) ===
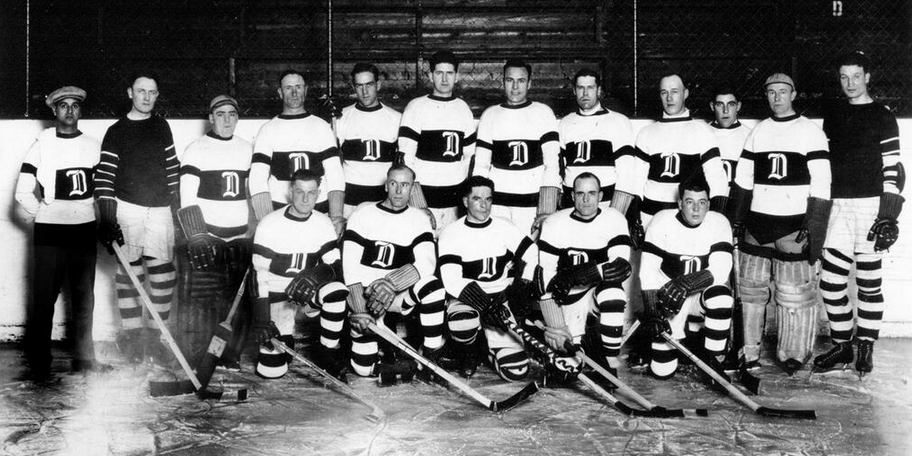
Team photo from Detroit's inaugural season (1926–27). The franchise was known as the Detroit Cougars from 1926 to 1930.

Following the 1926 Stanley Cup playoffs, during which the Western Hockey League (WHL) was widely reported to be on the verge of folding, the NHL held a meeting on April 17 to consider applications for expansion franchises, at which it was reported that five different groups sought a team for Detroit. During a subsequent meeting on May 15, 1926, the NHL owners voted, 6 to 2, to approve a franchise to the Townsend-Seyburn group of Detroit and named Charles A. Hughes as governor. WHL owners Frank and Lester Patrick made a deal to sell the league's players to the NHL and cease league operations. The new Detroit franchise purchased the players of the WHL's Victoria Cougars, who had won the Stanley Cup in 1925 and had made the 1926 Stanley Cup Final, to play for the team. The new Detroit franchise also adopted the Cougars' nickname in honor of the folded franchise.

Since no arena in Detroit was ready at the time, the Cougars played their first season at the Border Cities Arena in Windsor, Ontario. For the 1927–28 season, the Cougars moved into the new Detroit Olympia, which became their home rink until December 15, 1979. This was also the first season behind the bench for Jack Adams, who would become the face of the franchise for the next 36 years as either coach or general manager.

The Cougars made the Stanley Cup playoffs for the first time in 1929, with Carson Cooper leading the team in scoring. The Cougars were outscored 7–2 in the two-game series with the Toronto Maple Leafs. In 1930, the Cougars were renamed the Falcons, but their woes continued, as they usually finished near the bottom of the standings, even though they made the playoffs again in 1932.

In 1932, the NHL let grain merchant James E. Norris, who had made two previous unsuccessful bids to buy an NHL team, purchase the Falcons. Norris' first act upon taking control on October 5 was to change the team's name to the Red Wings. Earlier in the century, Norris had been a member of the Montreal Amateur Athletic Association (MAAA), a multi-sport club whose winged-wheel emblem derived from its cycling roots, and whose hockey team won the first Stanley Cup in 1893. Norris felt that a red version of the MAAA "Winged Wheelers" logo would be perfect for a team playing in the "Motor City". Norris also retained Adams on one year of probation for the 1932–33 NHL season. Adams managed to pass his probationary period by leading the Red Wings to their first-ever playoff series victory over the Montreal Maroons. The team then lost in the semifinals to the New York Rangers.

In 1934, the Red Wings made the Stanley Cup Final for the first time, with John Sorrell scoring 21 goals over 47 games and Larry Aurie leading the team in scoring. However, the Chicago Black Hawks defeated the Red Wings in the Stanley Cup Final, winning the best-of-five series in four games to claim their first title. Two seasons later, the Red Wings won their first Stanley Cup in 1936, defeating Toronto in four games. Detroit repeated as Stanley Cup champions in 1937, winning over the Rangers in the full five games. In 1938, the Montreal Canadiens and the Red Wings became the first NHL teams to play in Europe, playing in Paris and London. The Wings played nine games against the Canadiens and went 3–5–1. They did not play in Europe again until the preseason and start of the 2009–10 NHL season, in Sweden, against the St. Louis Blues.

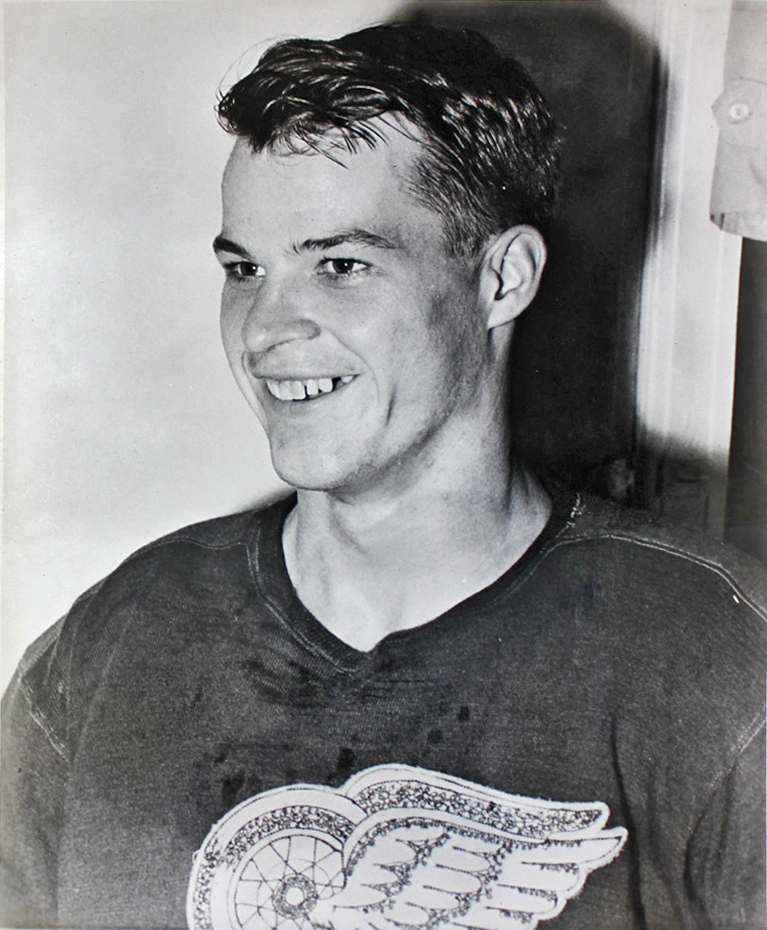
Making his NHL debut in 1946, Gordie Howe played alongside Sid Abel and Ted Lindsay from 1947 to 1951, forming the Production Line.

The Red Wings made the Stanley Cup Final in three consecutive years during the early 1940s. In 1941, they were swept by the Boston Bruins, and in 1942, they lost a seven-game series to Toronto after winning the first three games. However, in 1943, with Mud Bruneteau and Syd Howe scoring 23 and 20 goals, respectively, Detroit won their third Stanley Cup by sweeping the Bruins. Through the rest of the decade, the team made the playoffs every year, and reached the Stanley Cup Final three more times.

In 1946, one of the greatest players in hockey history came into the NHL with the Red Wings. Gordie Howe, a right winger from Floral, Saskatchewan, only scored seven goals and 15 assists in his first season, and would not reach his prime for a few more years. It was also the last season as head coach for Adams, who stepped down after the season to concentrate on his duties as general manager and was succeeded by minor league coach Tommy Ivan. By his second season, Howe was paired with Sid Abel and Ted Lindsay to form what would become one of the great lines in NHL history: the "Production Line". Lindsay's 33 goals propelled the Red Wings to the 1948 Stanley Cup Final, where they were swept by the Maple Leafs. Detroit reached the Stanley Cup Final again the following season, only to be swept again by Toronto.

=== Gordie Howe era (1950–1966) ===
During the 1950 semifinals, Leo Reise Jr. scored the winning goal in overtime, which prevented the Maple Leafs from winning four straight championships. In the 1950 Stanley Cup Final, the Red Wings defeated the New York Rangers in seven games. In game 7, Pete Babando scored the game winner in double overtime. After the game, Lindsay skated around the Olympia ice with the Stanley Cup.

After being upset by the Montreal Canadiens in the 1951 semifinals, Detroit won its fifth Stanley Cup in 1952, sweeping both the Maple Leafs and the Canadiens, with the Production Line of Howe, Abel and Lindsay joined by second-year goaltender Terry Sawchuk. Detroit became the first team in 17 years to go undefeated in the playoffs. They also scored 24 playoff goals, compared to Toronto and Montreal's combined total of 5. Abel left the Red Wings for Chicago during the off-season, and his spot on the roster was replaced by Alex Delvecchio. In December 1952, James E. Norris died. He was succeeded as team president by his daughter, Marguerite, which made her the first woman to head an NHL franchise.

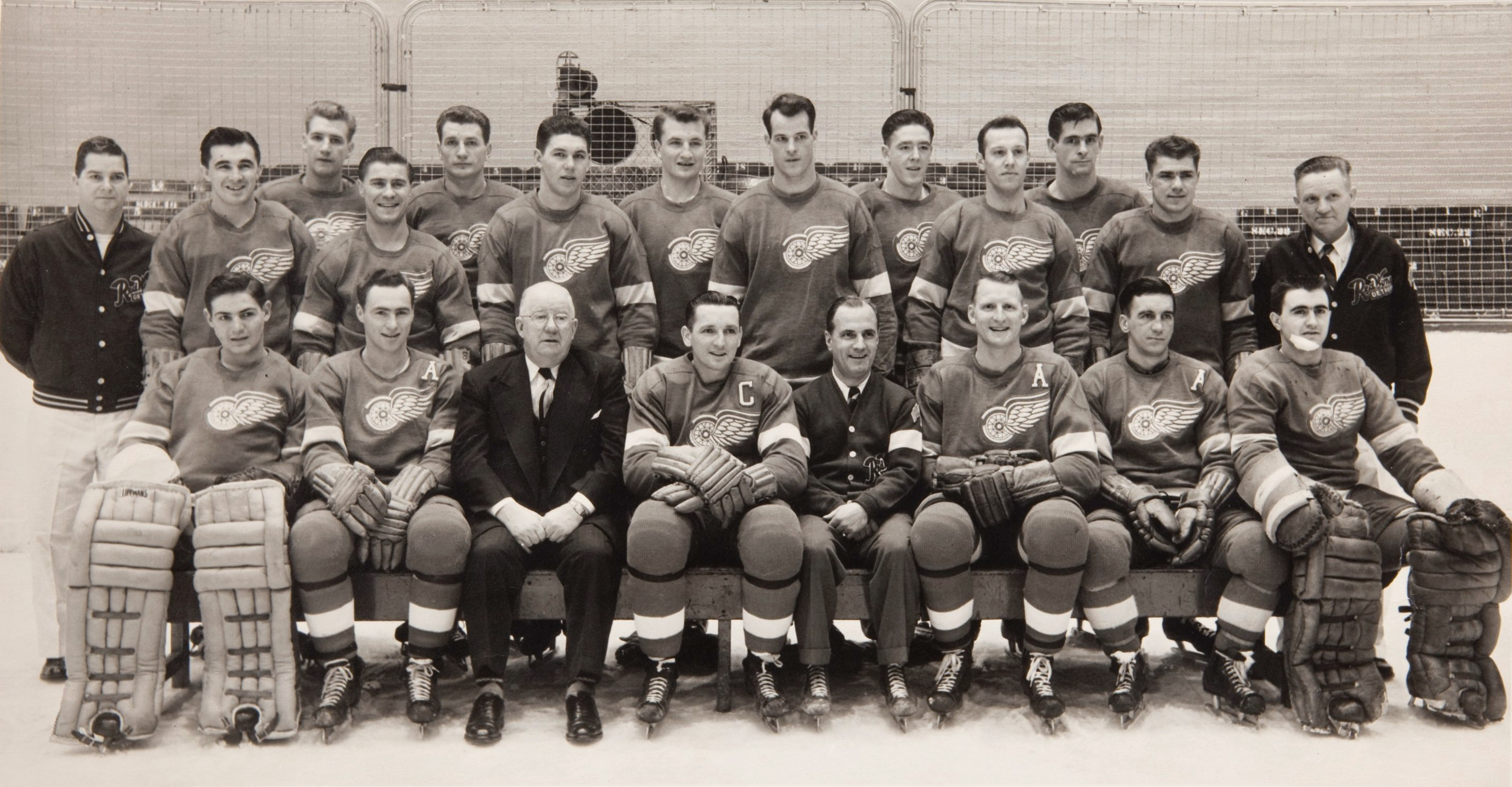
Team photo of the 1951–52 Detroit Red Wings. They won the Stanley Cup that season.

Following another playoff upset in 1953 at the hands of the Bruins, the Red Wings won back-to-back Stanley Cups, beating the rival powerhouse Montreal Canadiens. Both of the Stanley Cup Final series played between the two teams were decided in seven games. The seventh game during the 1954 Stanley Cup Final was won with one of the oddest cup winning goals ever, when the 5'7" left winger Tony Leswick, known more for his relentless checking than scoring prowess, shot a puck towards the Montreal goal from the middle of the ice. Habs defenseman Doug Harvey tried to gain control of the wobbly puck with his glove but instead redirected it past Montreal goalie Gerry McNeil. The repeat of the series the season after was closely contested, as all seven games were won by the home team, with Detroit taking the seventh game. Montreal was sorely lacking its all-star Maurice Richard, who was suspended after hitting a linesman during the regular season, and the Red Wings' stars carried their team, as Lindsay scored four goals in a single game and Howe scored 20 points during the playoffs, 12 of which during the Stanley Cup Final series, all new records in the league.

The 1954–55 season ended a run of seven straight regular season titles, an NHL record. During the 1955 off-season, Marguerite Norris lost an intra-family power struggle, and was forced to turn over the Red Wings to her younger brother Bruce. Detroit and Montreal once again met, in the 1956 Stanley Cup Final, but this time the Canadiens won the Stanley Cup, their first of five in a row. In 1957, Lindsay, who had scored 30 goals and led the league in assists with 55, teamed up with Harvey to help start the National Hockey League Players' Association (NHLPA). As a result, he and goaltender Glenn Hall were promptly traded to Chicago.

In 1958–59, the Red Wings missed the playoffs for the first time in 21 years. However, within a couple of years, the franchise was able to rejuvenate itself. The Red Wings made the Stanley Cup Final four times between 1960–61 and 1965–66 seasons. However, they came away empty-handed.

=== "Dead Wings" era (1967–1982) ===
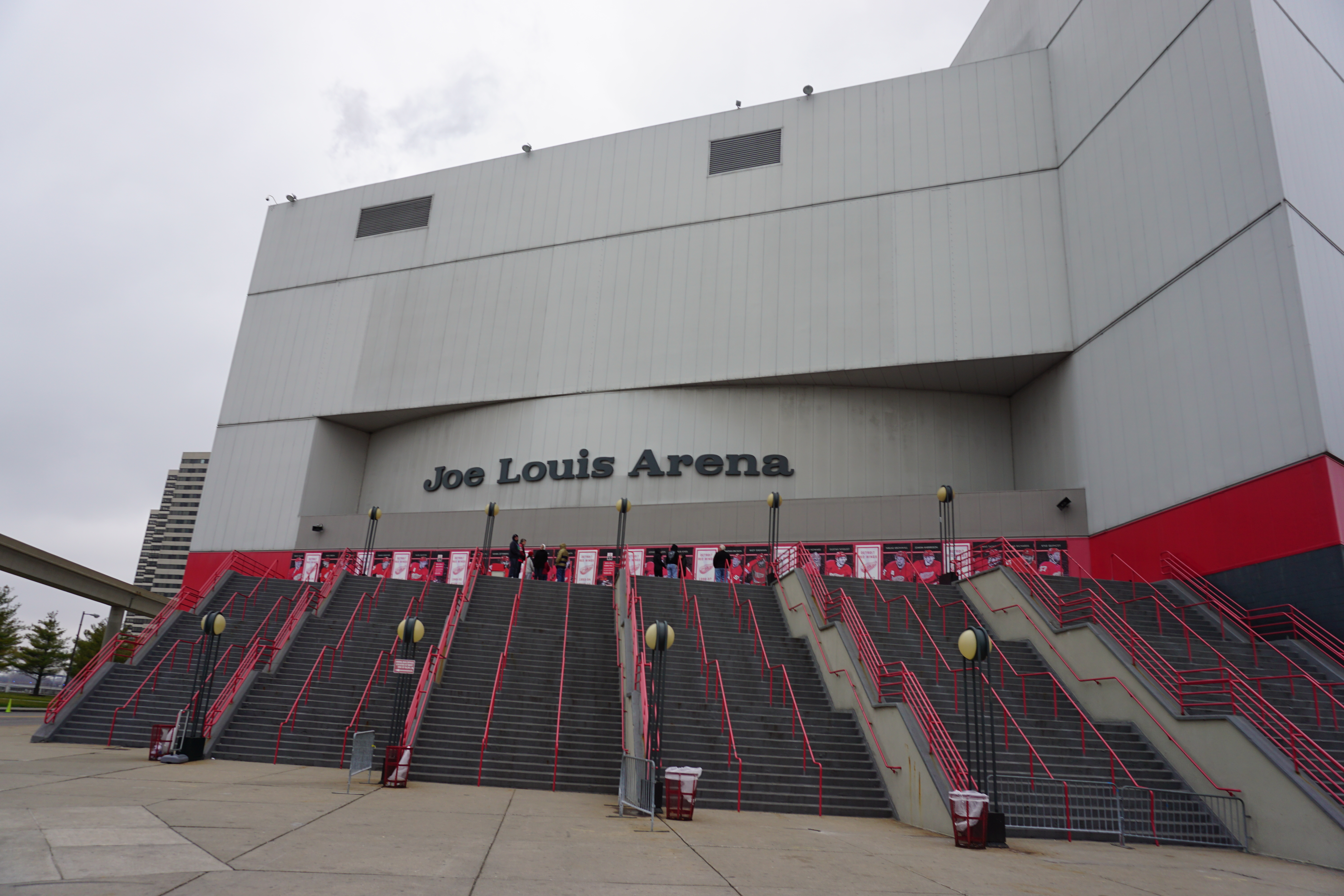
On December 27, 1979, the Red Wings played their first game at Joe Louis Arena, moving from the Detroit Olympia.

Only a year after making the 1966 Stanley Cup Final, the Red Wings finished a distant fifth, 24 points out of the playoffs. It was the beginning of a slump that they would not emerge from in almost 20 years. This period is derisively known as the "Dead Wings" era.

One factor in the Red Wings' decline was the end of the old development system. Another factor was Ned Harkness, who was hired as coach in 1970 and was promoted to general manager midway through the season. A successful college hockey coach, Harkness tried to force his two-way style of play on a veteran Red Wings team resistant to change. They chafed under his rule in which he demanded short hair and no smoking, and put other rules in place regarding drinking and phone calls. Harkness was forced to resign in 1974, ending the period colloquially referred to as "Darkness with Harkness".

During the expansion season of 1967–68, the Red Wings acquired longtime star left-winger Frank Mahovlich from the defending Cup champions in Toronto. Mahovlich would go on a line with Howe and Delvecchio, and in 1968–69, he scored a career-high 49 goals and had two All-Star seasons in Detroit. However, Mahovlich was traded to Montreal in 1971, while Howe announced his retirement the same year. Throughout the decade, the Red Wings were hampered due to a number of factors.

On December 27, 1979, during the 1979–80 season, the Red Wings officially began playing at the Joe Louis Arena after leaving the Olympia, where they had played since 1927. In 1982, after 50 years of family ownership, Bruce Norris sold the Red Wings to Mike Ilitch, founder of the pizza chain Little Caesars.

=== Steve Yzerman era (1983–2006) ===
In 1983, the Red Wings drafted Steve Yzerman, a center from the Peterborough Petes, with their first-round pick. He led the team in scoring in his rookie year. That season, with John Ogrodnick, Ivan Boldirev, Ron Duguay, and Brad Park, Detroit made the playoffs for the first time in six years, with Park ended up winning the Bill Masterton Memorial Trophy. He was later asked to coach the Red Wings after they fired Harry Neale 35 games into the 1985–86 season, however, he was fired on June 3, 1986, after they finished last place with a 17–57–6 record for only 40 points, the worst record in the league. This was the same year that the Red Wings added enforcer Bob Probert, one of the most familiar faces of the team during the 1980s and 1990s.

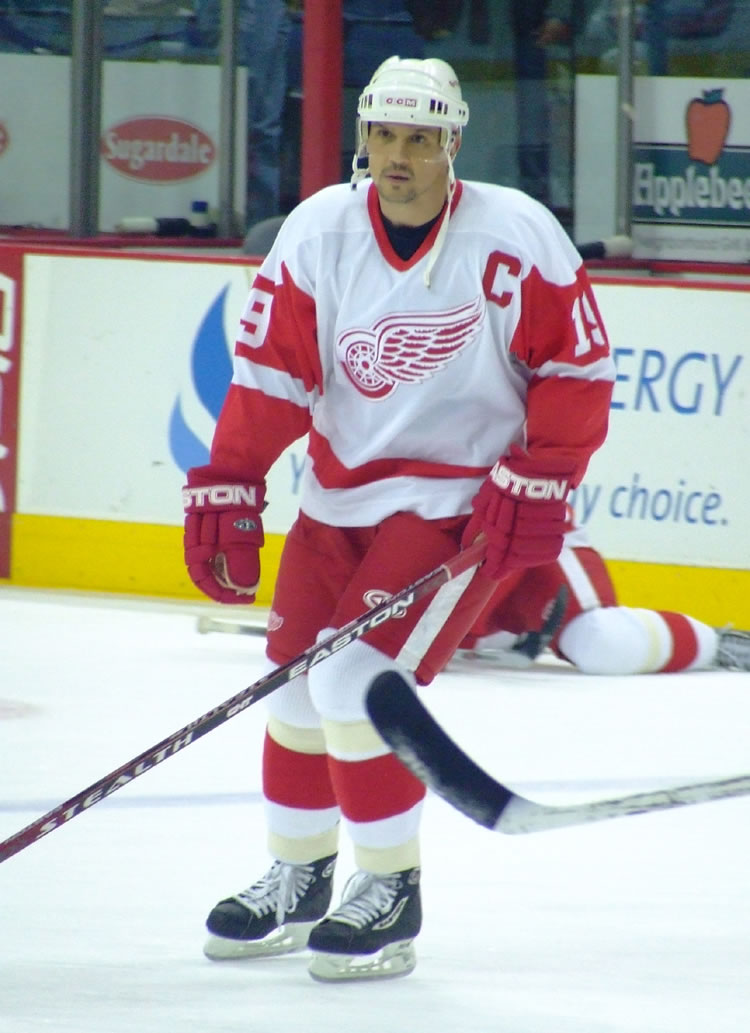
Named team captain in 1986, Steve Yzerman captained the Red Wings until his retirement in 2006.

In the 1986–87 season, with Yzerman, now the captain following the departure of Danny Gare, joined by Petr Klíma, Adam Oates, Gerard Gallant, defenseman Darren Veitch, and new head coach Jacques Demers, the Red Wings won a playoff series for only the second time in the modern era. They made it all the way to the conference finals against the powerful Edmonton Oilers, but lost to the eventual Stanley Cup champions in five games. In 1988, they won their first division title in 23 years. They did so, however, in a relatively weak division, as no other team in the Norris finished above .500. As was the case in the previous season, they made it to the conference finals only to lose again to the eventual Stanley Cup champion Oilers in five games.

In 1989, Yzerman scored a career-best 65 goals, but Detroit was upset in the first round by the Chicago Blackhawks. The following season, Yzerman scored 62 goals, but the team missed the playoffs.

After the season, Demers was fired and was replaced by Bryan Murray as the new head coach. Murray was unable to get them back over .500, but they returned to the playoffs. Yzerman was joined by Sergei Fedorov, who would be an award-winner and frequent all-star for the team during the 1990s. In 1991, the team signed free agent Ray Sheppard, who would score a career-best 52 goals three years later. In 1993, the Red Wings acquired top defenseman Paul Coffey. Also joining the Red Wings around this time were draft picks Vladimir Konstantinov, Nicklas Lidström, Vyacheslav Kozlov, Darren McCarty, and Chris Osgood.

==== The Russian Five and back-to-back Stanley Cups (1994–1998) ====
In 1993, former Montreal Canadiens coach Scotty Bowman was hired as the new head coach. In his second season, the lockout-shortened 1994–95 NHL season, Bowman guided Detroit to its first Stanley Cup Final appearance in 29 years, only to be swept by the New Jersey Devils.

During the 1995–96 season, the Red Wings won a then NHL record 62 games. However, after defeating the St. Louis Blues in seven games, they would fall in the conference finals to the eventual Stanley Cup champions, the Colorado Avalanche.

The following season, the Red Wings acquired Brendan Shanahan and Larry Murphy. In the playoffs, they would defeat the St. Louis Blues, the Mighty Ducks of Anaheim and the Avalanche in the first three rounds. In the 1997 Stanley Cup Final, the Red Wings swept the Philadelphia Flyers. It was their first Stanley Cup since 1955, breaking the longest drought (42 years long) in the league at that time. Mike Vernon was awarded the Conn Smythe Trophy.

Misfortune befell the Red Wings six days after their championship; defenseman Vladimir Konstantinov, one of the members of the "Russian Five", suffered a brain injury in a limousine accident, and his career came to an abrupt end. As a result, the team dedicated the 1997–98 season to him. The Red Wings won the Stanley Cup in four games, this time over the Washington Capitals, and Konstantinov was brought onto the ice in his wheelchair so he could touch it.

==== Superstar acquisitions and more success (1999–2006) ====
The following season, the Red Wings appeared to be poised to win a third consecutive Stanley Cup when they acquired three-time Norris Trophy winner Chris Chelios from his hometown Chicago Blackhawks in March 1999. Also acquired at the trade deadline were defenseman Ulf Samuelsson, winger Wendel Clark, and goaltender Bill Ranford. Despite high aspirations, however, Detroit would end up losing in the conference semifinals to Colorado in six games. In 2000, the Red Wings would finish second in the Central Division. Just like the previous season, however, they would lose to the Avalanche in the Western Conference semifinals.

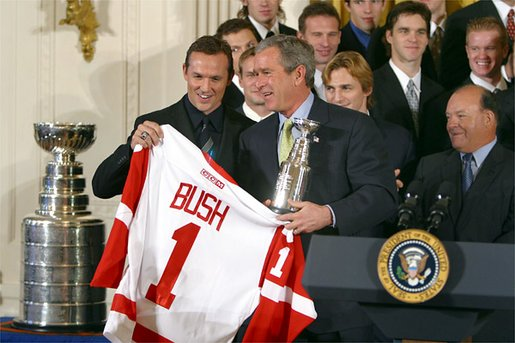
The Red Wings were invited to the White House in November 2002, after winning the Stanley Cup.

In 2001, Detroit, the NHL's second-best team in the regular season, were upset in the playoffs by the Los Angeles Kings. During the ensuing off-season, the team acquired goaltender Dominik Hašek (the defending Vezina Trophy winner) and forwards Luc Robitaille and Brett Hull. Russian prospect Pavel Datsyuk also joined the team. Strengthened by the additions, the Red Wings posted the league's best record in the 2001–02 regular season and defeated Colorado in seven games in the conference finals after beating the Vancouver Canucks and St. Louis Blues in rounds one and two. The Red Wings then went on to capture another Stanley Cup, in five games, over the Carolina Hurricanes, with Nicklas Lidström winning the Conn Smythe Trophy as the playoffs' MVP. Bowman and Hašek both retired after the season.

The 2002 off-season saw the Red Wings promote associate coach Dave Lewis to the head coach position after Bowman's retirement. In the market for a new starting goaltender after Hašek's retirement, they signed Curtis Joseph from the Toronto Maple Leafs to a three-year, $24 million deal. Also new to the lineup was highly touted Swedish prospect Henrik Zetterberg. The Red Wings finished the season second in the Western Conference, which pitted them in the 2003 playoffs against the seventh-seeded Mighty Ducks of Anaheim. The Mighty Ducks shocked the ice hockey world when they swept the Red Wings in four games en route to a Stanley Cup Final appearance.

In the off-season, long time Red Wing Fedorov signed with the Mighty Ducks as a free agent. Additionally, Hašek opted to come out of retirement and join the Red Wings for the 2003–04 season. Joseph, despite being one of the highest-paid players in the NHL, spent part of the season in the minor leagues. Hašek himself would be sidelined with a groin injury. Notwithstanding, the Red Wings would finish atop of the Central Division and the NHL standings. The Red Wings eliminated the Nashville Predators in six games in the first round of the 2004 playoffs, which led to a second round match-up with the Calgary Flames. The teams split the first four games, and headed to Detroit for a pivotal game 5, which the Red Wings lost 1–0. They were then eliminated two nights later in Calgary by the same score in overtime. The Red Wings did not play in the 2004–05 season due to the lockout, which canceled the entire NHL season.

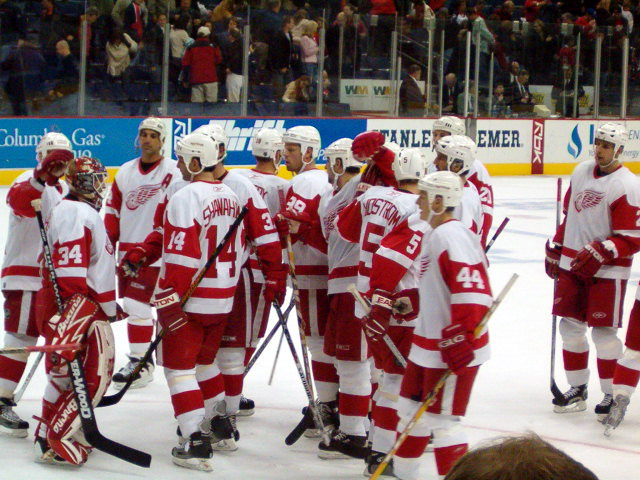
The Red Wings during a game in the 2005–06 season. They won that season's Presidents' Trophy.

On July 15, 2005, Mike Babcock, former head coach in Anaheim, became the new head coach for the Red Wings. On November 21, 2005, defenseman Jiří Fischer went into cardiac arrest and collapsed on the bench during a game against the Nashville Predators. The game was canceled because of his injury and was made up on January 23, 2006. This was the first time in NHL history a game had been postponed due to an injury. While the game was played for the full 60 minutes, the Predators were allowed to maintain their 1–0 lead from the original game and won 3–2. The Red Wings won the Presidents' Trophy with a 58–16–8 record, earning them 124 points and secured home ice advantage for the entire playoffs. They opened the 2006 playoffs against the Edmonton Oilers with a 3–2 overtime victory at Joe Louis Arena, but the Oilers won four of the next five games to take the series.

Continuing the shakeup of the Red Wings roster, the off-season saw the departure of Brendan Shanahan, the return of Dominik Hašek and the retirement of Steve Yzerman. Yzerman retired with the distinction of having been the longest-serving team captain in NHL history.

=== The "Euro-Twins" era (2006–2017) ===
The Red Wings opened the 2006–07 season with Nicklas Lidström as the new captain. The team retired Yzerman's jersey number 19 on January 2, 2007. The Red Wings finished first in the Western Conference and tied for first in the NHL with the Buffalo Sabres, but the Sabres were awarded the Presidents' Trophy because they had more wins. Detroit advanced to the third round of the 2007 playoffs after defeating Calgary and the San Jose Sharks both in six games, coming back to win three-straight after the Sharks had a 2–1 series lead. The Red Wings then lost to the eventual Stanley Cup champion Anaheim Ducks in the conference finals in six games.

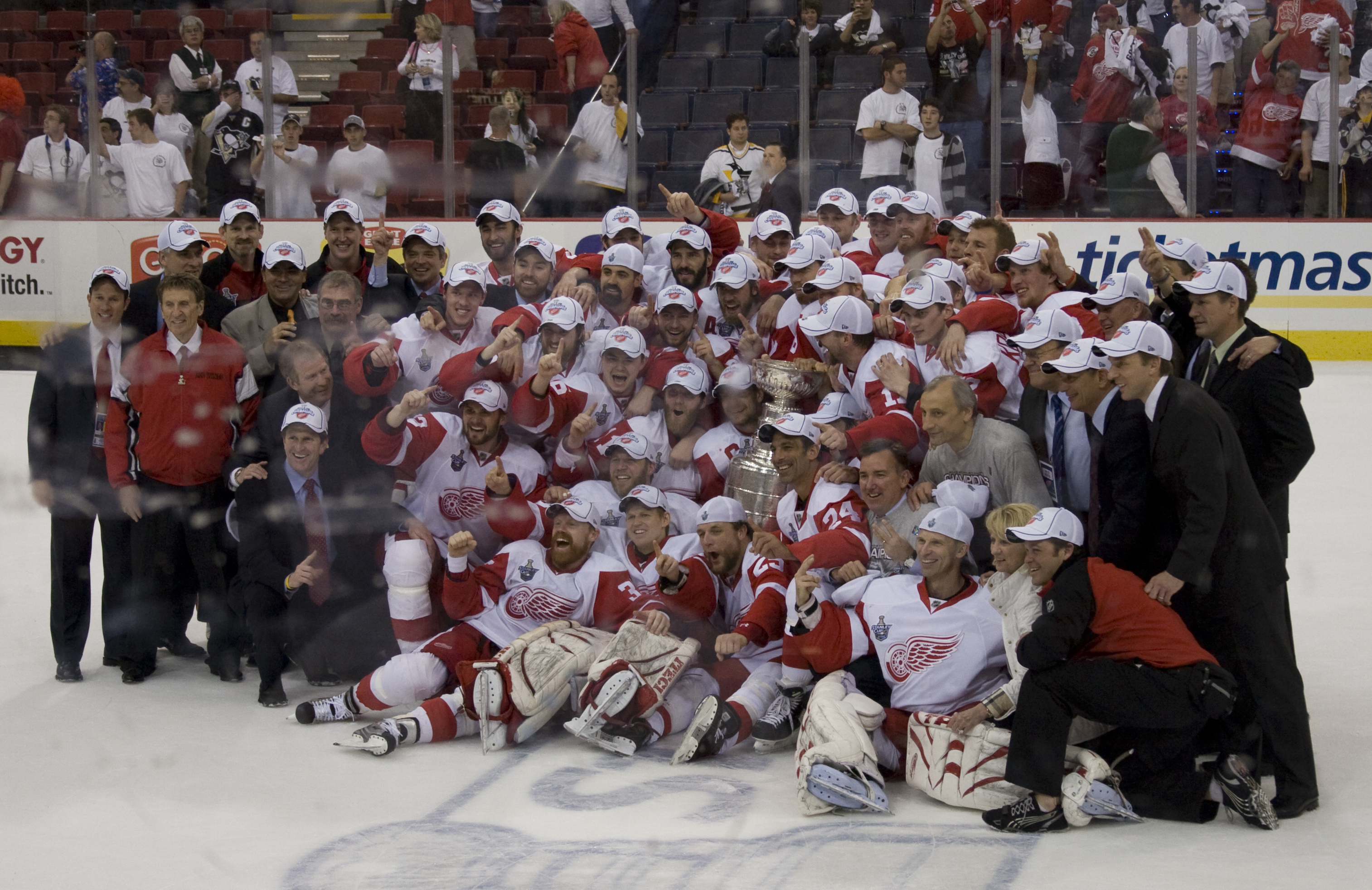
The Red Wings posed with the Stanley Cup after they defeated the Pittsburgh Penguins in the 2008 Stanley Cup Final.

To start the 2007–08 campaign, Zetterberg recorded at least a point in each of Detroit's first 17 games, setting a club record. The Wings cruised to the playoffs, where they faced the Nashville Predators. After goaltender Dominik Hašek played poorly in games 3 and 4 of the series, both losses, head coach Mike Babcock replaced him with Chris Osgood. Osgood never left the net for the remainder of the playoffs, as the Red Wings came back in that series in six games. In the second round, they swept the Colorado Avalanche in four games. They then went on to the Stanley Cup Final after defeating the Dallas Stars in six games in the conference finals. The Red Wings won the Stanley Cup against the Pittsburgh Penguins in game 6 on June 4, 2008, by the score of 3–2. This was the Red Wings' fourth Stanley Cup in 11 years and their 11th overall in franchise history. Zetterberg scored the winning goal in the decisive game, and was also named the winner of the Conn Smythe Trophy as the most valuable player of the playoffs. Lidström became the first non-North American player to captain a Stanley Cup-winning team.

On July 2, the Red Wings announced the signing of Marián Hossa. On January 1, 2009, the Red Wings played the Chicago Blackhawks in the second NHL Winter Classic at Chicago's Wrigley Field, defeating them 6–4. Although they finished second in the conference to the San Jose Sharks, the Wings became the first team in NHL history to top 100 points in nine straight seasons. In the playoffs, the Red Wings swept the Columbus Blue Jackets, then defeated the eighth-seeded Anaheim Ducks in a hard-fought seven-game series. They took on the vastly improved Chicago Blackhawks in the conference finals, winning in five games. The Red Wings faced the Pittsburgh Penguins in the Stanley Cup Final for a second consecutive year, but this series featured a different outcome as the Penguins defeated the Red Wings in seven games. The Red Wings became only the second NHL team to lose the Stanley Cup at home in game 7.

The Red Wings began the 2009–10 NHL season in Stockholm, losing both games to the St. Louis Blues 4–3 and 5–3, respectively. They were plagued by injuries throughout the season and lost the second most man games to injury, with only the last place Edmonton Oilers losing more. The beginning of the season was a struggle for the Red Wings, with key players out of the lineup, including Zetterberg, Tomas Holmstrom, Johan Franzen, Valtteri Filppula and Niklas Kronwall. After the Olympic break, Detroit posted a record of 13–3–2 and earned 28 points, the most by any team in the NHL. This run helped them secure the fifth playoff seed in the Western Conference. This, however, was the first time the Red Wings did not have home ice advantage in a playoff series in ten seasons. Detroit won their first-round playoff series over the Phoenix Coyotes in seven games. In the second round, they were defeated by the San Jose Sharks in five games.

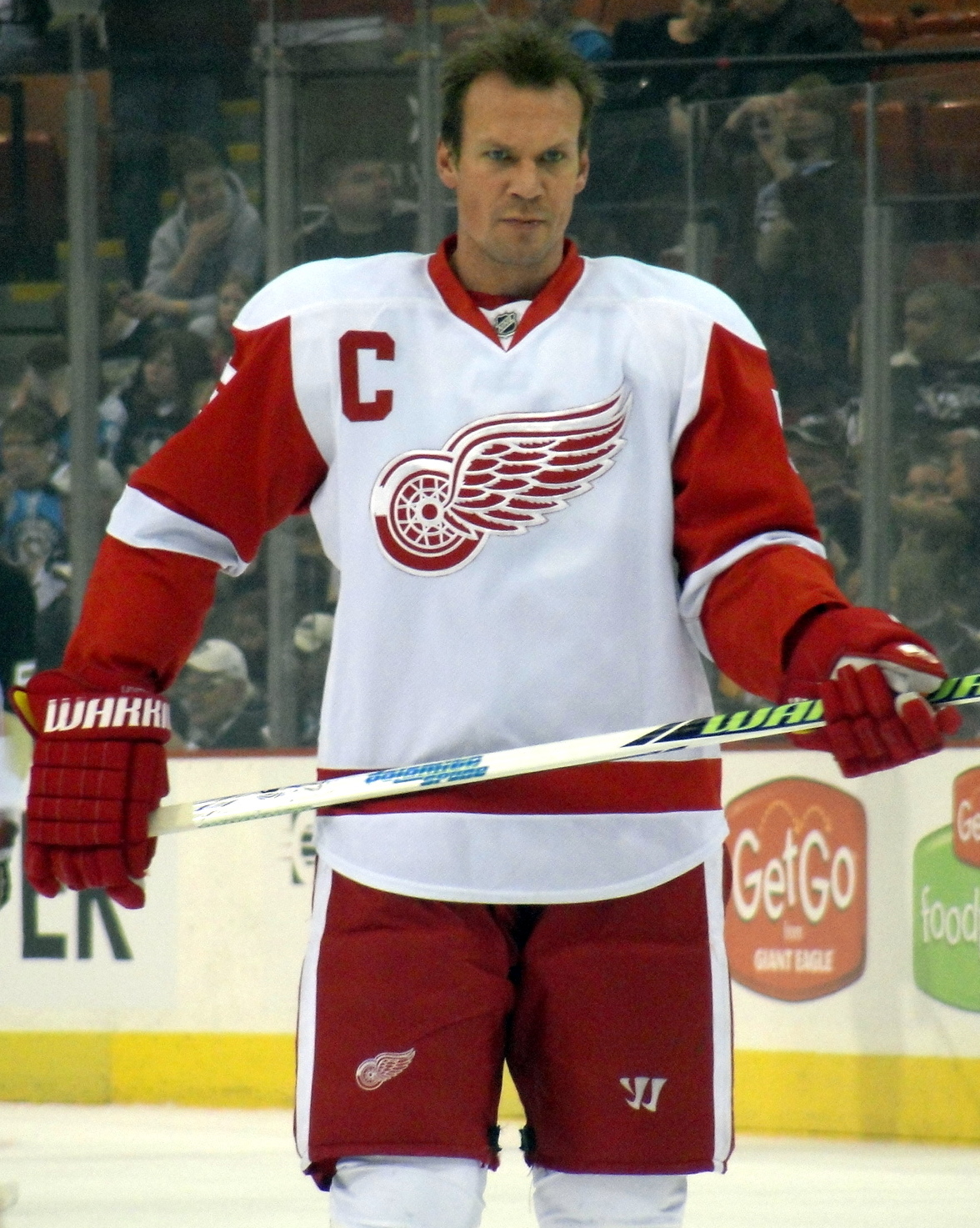
Nicklas Lidström during the 2009–10 season. Named captain in 2006, he maintained the position until his retirement in 2012.

A healthier Red Wings team finished the 2010–11 NHL season with a 47–25–10 record and 104 points to win the Central Division title. They once again faced the Phoenix Coyotes in the first round of the playoffs, this time sweeping them 4–0. The Red Wings then went on to face the Sharks in round two. After losing the first three games of the series, the Red Wings won three consecutive games to force a game 7, becoming just the eighth team in NHL history to accomplish the feat. The Red Wings lost game 7 to the Sharks by a score of 3–2 and were eliminated.

During the 2011 off-season, Red Wings defenseman Brian Rafalski retired. Detroit soon signed free agent defenseman Ian White to take his place. Long-time Red Wings Chris Osgood and Kris Draper also announced their retirement from hockey, with both soon taking positions within the club. Detroit signed goaltender Ty Conklin for his second stint with the team. Tragedy struck the organization and the rest of the NHL with the Lokomotiv Yaroslavl plane crash, which killed former Red Wings assistant coach Brad McCrimmon and defenseman Ruslan Salei, who had joined the KHL team during the summer. Stefan Liv, a former Red Wings goaltending prospect, was also among the fatalities. The Red Wings then added a patch to the left arm of their uniforms with the trio's initials.

During the season, the Red Wings won an NHL-record 23 consecutive home games. The Red Wings also made the NHL playoffs, extending their streak of 21-straight playoff appearances, as the fifth seed. They were defeated in five games by their opening round opponent, the Nashville Predators. On May 31, 2012, Nicklas Lidström retired.

Zetterberg was named successor to Lidström as team captain. On July 1, the first day of the NHL free agency period, the Red Wings signed Swiss forward Damien Brunner to a one-year, entry-level contract; forward Jordin Tootoo to a three-year, $5.7 million contract; and goaltender Jonas Gustavsson to a two-year, $3 million deal.

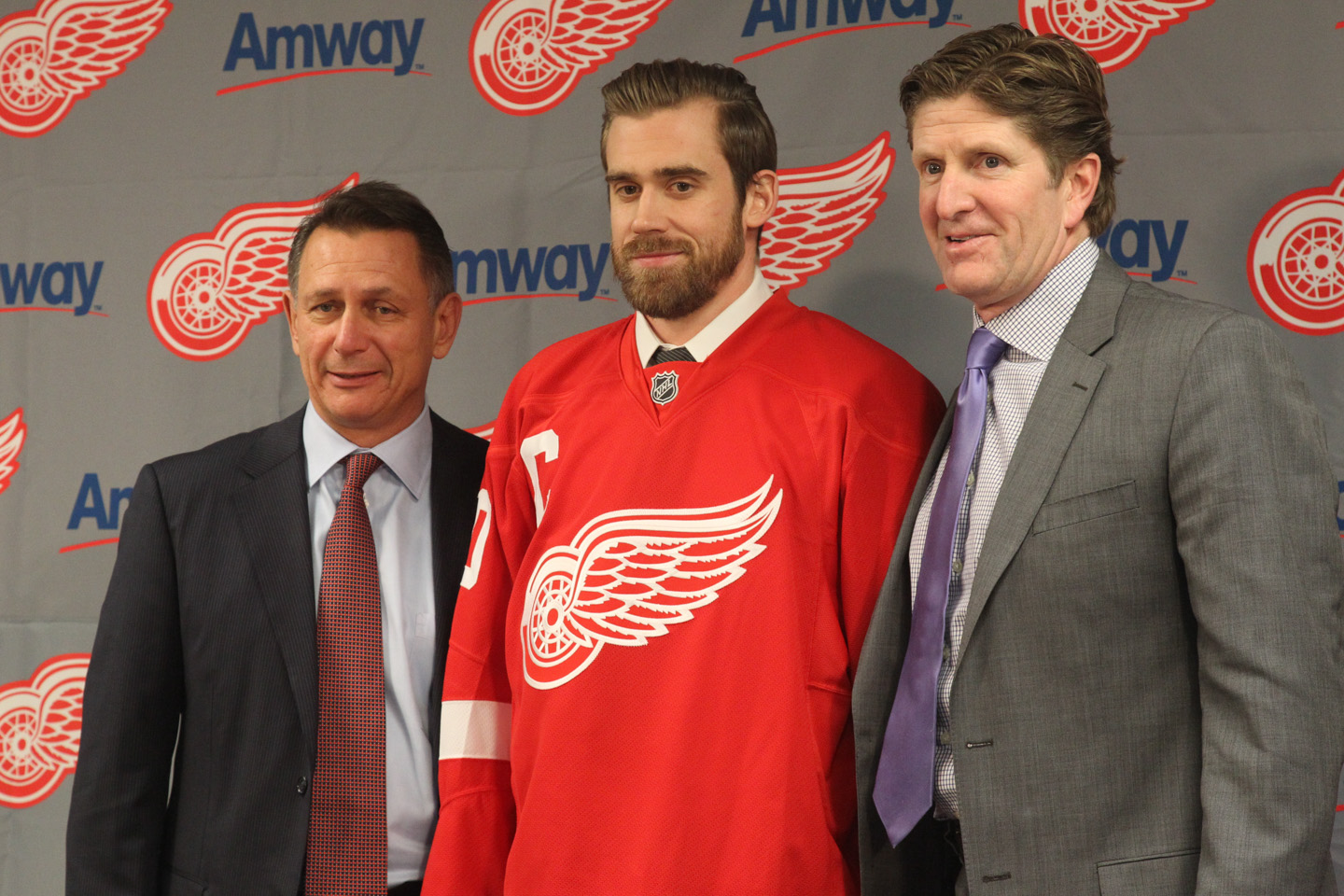
Ken Holland and Mike Babcock named Henrik Zetterberg as the team captain in 2013.

The team won their final four games of the 2012–13 season to earn the seventh seed of the playoffs. The Red Wings' 3–0 victory over the Dallas Stars on April 27, 2013, preserved their streak of 22 consecutive playoff appearances. As the seventh seed in the 2013 playoffs, the Red Wings faced the second-seeded Anaheim Ducks. They survived a fierce battle that included four overtime games, winning the series 4–3 after a 3–2 game 7 victory in Anaheim. The next round pitted the Red Wings against the top-seeded Chicago Blackhawks. Despite jumping out to a 3–1 series lead, the Red Wings ultimately lost to the eventual Stanley Cup champions in seven games.

On July 5, the Red Wings signed long time Ottawa Senators captain Daniel Alfredsson to a one-year contract and long time Florida Panther Stephen Weiss to a five-year contract. In the 2013–14 season, the Red Wings moved to the Atlantic Division of the Eastern Conference as part of the NHL's realignment. The move to the Eastern Conference allowed them to play a majority of their games against teams in the Eastern Time Zone. On April 9, 2014, the Red Wings clinched their 23rd consecutive playoff appearance. They were eliminated in the first round by the Boston Bruins.

On April 9, 2015, the Red Wings clinched their 24th consecutive playoff appearance, thus extending their streak. The team was eliminated in the first round by the Tampa Bay Lightning. Petr Mrázek had earned the starting goaltender role from Jimmy Howard, and Kronwall was suspended for game 7 as Tampa Bay erased a 3–2 deficit to win the series. Mike Babcock, concluding the final year of his contract, left the Red Wings to become the new head coach of the Toronto Maple Leafs. Jeff Blashill, head coach of the Red Wings' top minor league affiliate, the Grand Rapids Griffins, was named his successor on June 9.

On April 9, 2016, despite the Red Wings losing 3–2 to the New York Rangers, the Ottawa Senators defeated the Boston Bruins 6–1 as the Red Wings narrowly made the playoffs and extended their streak to a 25th season. They lost in the first round to the Lightning again, this time in five games.

During the off-season, Datsyuk decided to return to Russia. On February 10, 2017, club owner Mike Ilitch died. The Red Wings' playoff streak ended after 25 seasons in the 2016–17 season. The Red Wings won their last game at Joe Louis Arena 4–1 on April 9, against the New Jersey Devils.

=== Little Caesars Arena and playoff drought (2017–present) ===
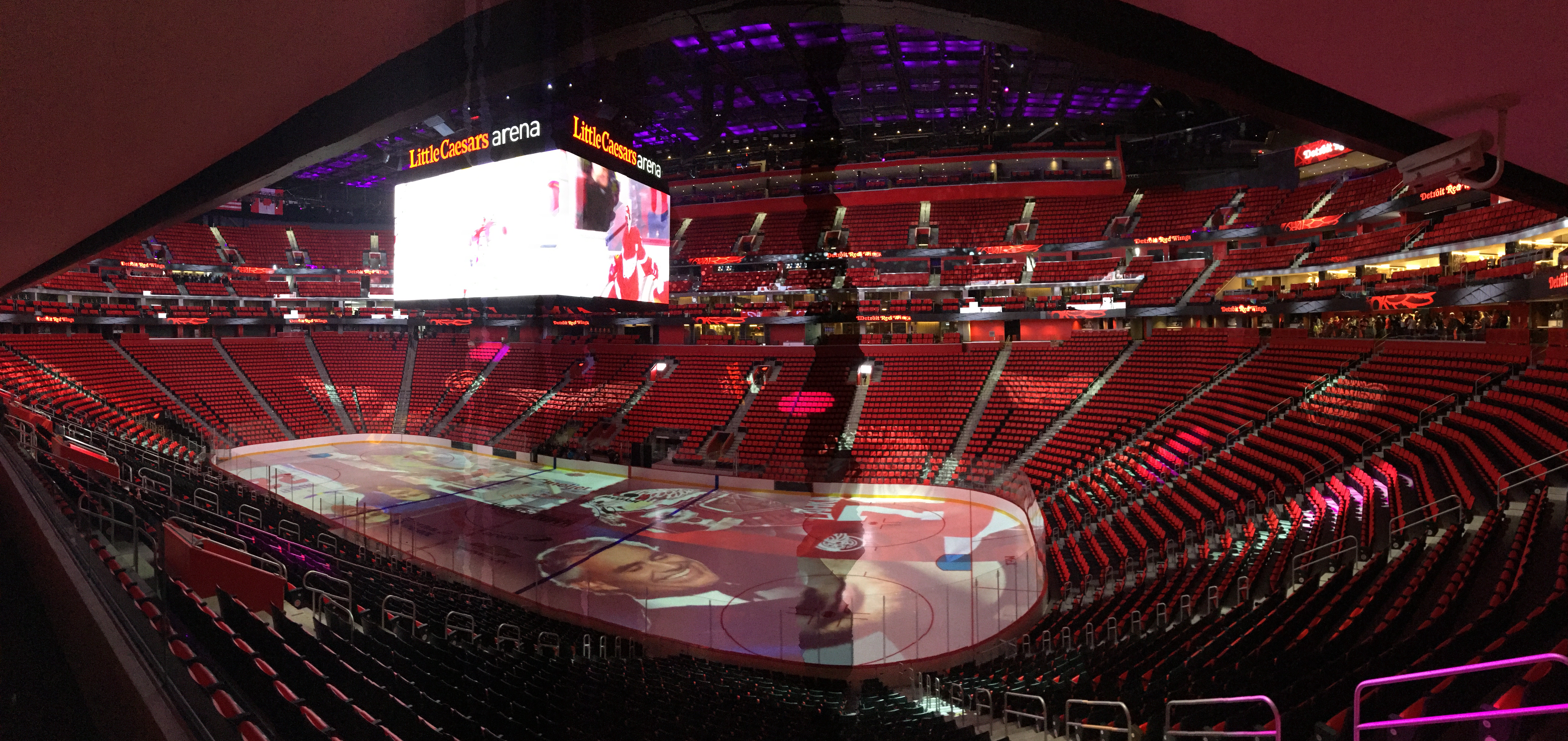
Interior of Little Caesars Arena in September 2017. The Red Wings played their first regular season game at the arena a month later.

The Red Wings played their first regular season game at Little Caesars Arena on October 5, 2017, winning 4–2 over the Minnesota Wild. The Red Wings finished the 2017–18 season with a 30–39–13 record. They missed the playoffs for the second season in a row, marking the first time since the early 1980s the team missed the playoffs in consecutive years. The Red Wings finished the 2018–19 season with a 32–40–10 record, missing the playoffs for a third consecutive season.

On April 19, 2019, the Red Wings announced that Steve Yzerman rejoined the team as general manager and executive vice president. On February 21, 2020, the Red Wings became the first team to be eliminated from playoff contention before the trade deadline since the 2003–04 Pittsburgh Penguins. On March 10, 2020, the Red Wings clinched the worst overall record in NHL for the first time since the 1985–86 season. On March 12, the 2019–20 season was suspended by the NHL due to the COVID-19 pandemic. On May 26, 2020, the NHL announced that the rest of the season was over for the seven teams that did not qualify for the 24-team Stanley Cup playoffs, which included the Red Wings. With a record of 17–49–5, this was the first time since the 1985–86 season that the Red Wings finished with fewer than 20 wins. The Red Wings also became the second team since the 2004–05 NHL lockout, and the subsequent start of the salary cap era, to finish with a sub-.300 points percentage, along with the 2016–17 Colorado Avalanche. Their .275 points percentage was the worst for an NHL team since the 1999–2000 Atlanta Thrashers.

Dylan Larkin was named the Red Wings captain on January 13, 2021, who succeeded Henrik Zetterberg following his retirement in 2018. On April 26, the Red Wings were eliminated from playoff contention for the fifth consecutive season. They would ultimately finish with a 19–27–10 record. The Red Wings finished the 2021–22 season at 32–40–10. They missed the playoff for the sixth consecutive season. On April 30, 2022, Jeff Blashill was fired as head coach. They then hired Derek Lalonde as their head coach on June 30, 2022. During 2022–23 season, the Red Wings would re-sign Dylan Larkin to an eight-year contract extension. The Red Wings finished the season at 35–37–10. They missed the playoffs for the seventh consecutive season. The Red Wings finished the 2023–24 season with a 41–32–9 record. However, they were eliminated from playoff contention for the eighth consecutive season via tiebreaker on April 16, 2024, after the Washington Capitals' 2–1 win over the Philadelphia Flyers.

On December 26, 2024, after a slow start to the 2024–25 season, the Red Wings fired head coach Lalonde and assistant head coach Bob Boughner. Todd McLellan was hired as their new head coach, with Trent Yawney as an assistant head coach. On April 12, 2025, the Red Wings were eliminated from playoff contention for the ninth consecutive season after the Montreal Canadiens lost in overtime to the Toronto Maple Leafs. This extended their longest playoff drought in franchise history. They finished the season with a 39–35–8 record.

On April 11, 2026, the Red Wings were eliminated from playoff contention for the tenth consecutive season following a 5–3 loss to the New Jersey Devils. With the Buffalo Sabres ending their 14-season playoff drought, the Red Wings currently hold the longest active playoff drought in the NHL. They finished the season with a 41–31–10 record. On July 15, it was announced that Yzerman would transition into a senior advisor position, but would also remain as the interim general manager and executive vice president until a successor was named. On September 15, Shawn Horcoff was named interim general manager.

== Team information ==
=== Logo and uniforms ===
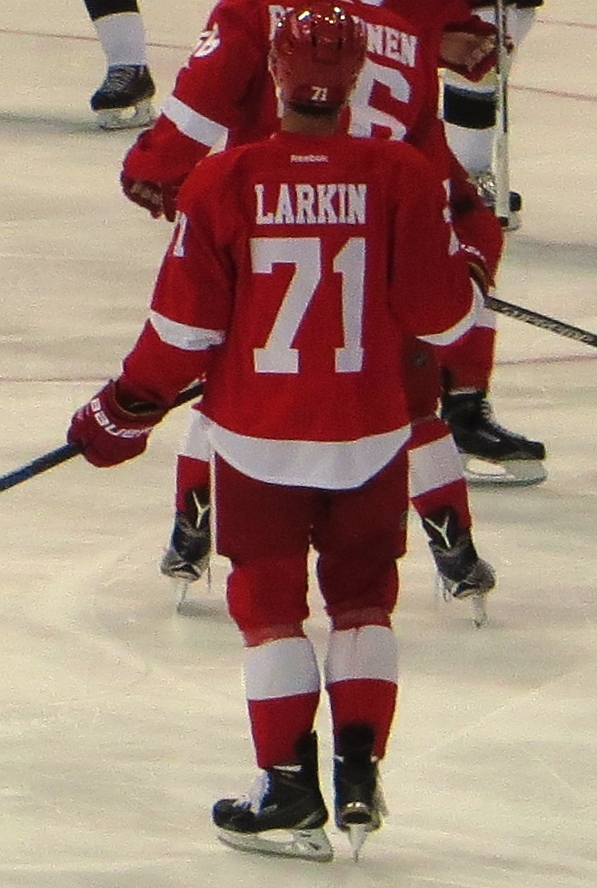
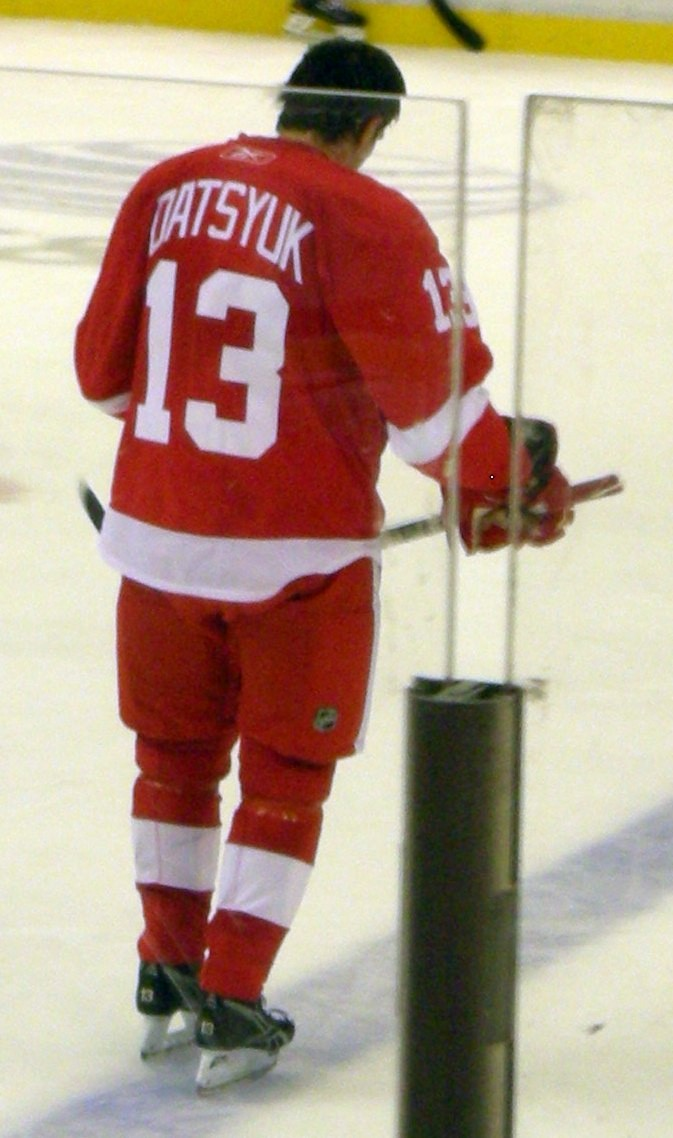
In the preseason, the Red Wings wear straight serifed nameplates on their jerseys, as seen on Dylan Larkin (left). In the regular season and playoffs, they wear vertical arched letters, as seen on Pavel Datsyuk (right).

The Red Wings' jerseys (traditionally known in hockey as "sweaters") have been more or less the same since the 1930s – a white or red base with red or white piping. The only significant changes have been the replacement of the word Detroit with the "winged wheel" logo in 1932, and vertical arch lettering for the players' names and block letters in 1983. The Red Wings wear the vertical arched letters in the regular season and playoffs, but use straight serifed nameplates during the preseason.

The Hockey News voted the Red Wings' "winged wheel" logo the second best in the league in 2008. The Red Wings, like all NHL teams, updated their jerseys to the new Rbk Edge standard for the 2007–08 NHL season. The Red Wings kept their design as close to original as possible, the exceptions being: On the road (white) jersey, there was more red on the sleeves as the color panel began closer to the shoulder, and the letters of the captain and alternate captains were moved to the right shoulder.

When Adidas became the uniform outfitter starting with the 2017–18 season, the Red Wings kept the same basic look.

The Red Wings have rarely used any alternate logos or uniforms since the trend became popular in the 1990s, the sole exceptions were select games of the 1991–92 season commemorating the league's 75th anniversary, and for a commemorative game on January 27, 1994, at Chicago Stadium. Those jerseys were based on the uniforms worn by the team (then the Detroit Cougars) in 1927–28. The throwbacks are primarily white with five red horizontal stripes on the body, the broadest middle stripe bearing "Detroit" in bold letters, and three red stripes on the sleeves. This jersey served as the basis for the uniforms worn by Wayne Gretzky's team of NHLPA All-Stars, nicknamed the "99ers", for their exhibition tour in Europe during the 1994–95 NHL lockout.

Stylized "D" logo used by the team during its inaugural season. The stylized "D" logo served as the basis for a "retro" alternate jerseys introduced in 2009.

The Red Wings wore alternative "retro" jerseys for the 2009 Winter Classic in Chicago. The jerseys were based on the uniforms worn by the Detroit Cougars during their inaugural season of 1926–27. These jerseys were white, with a single bold red stripe on the sleeves and chest, and a uniquely styled white Old English D centered on the chest stripe. These jerseys were also worn for their final 2009 regular season home game, again against the Chicago Blackhawks. The Red Wings again used an alternate jersey mimicking throwback jerseys for the 2014 Winter Classic against the Toronto Maple Leafs at Michigan Stadium.

The Red Wings wore a specially designed one-time-only jersey for their Stadium Series game in Denver against the Colorado Avalanche on February 27, 2016. The majority of this jersey was the traditional red, decorated with a thick diagonal white stripe running from the player's right shoulder across the front towards the left hip. The bottom of each sleeve featured a thick white stripe from wrist to elbow. The crest on the front of the jersey was a stylized red D. The words "Red Wings" were printed in all capital letters on the left side of the collar, and the phrase "EST. 1926" was printed inside the back of the collar. These jerseys featured the current Red Wings logo on the left shoulder cap. The names and numbers were printed larger than traditional NHL jerseys to increase visibility and player identification for fans watching the game at Coors Field, a stadium traditionally used for Major League Baseball.

The Red Wings unveiled a uniform patch on September 27, 2016, to honor Gordie Howe, who died on June 10, 2016. The patch was a depiction of Howe's jersey number 9 and was worn by the team above the logo on the front of the jersey on the left side of the chest for all 82 regular season games during the 2016–17 season.

The Red Wings wore a specially designed one-time-only jersey for the Centennial Classic in Toronto against the Toronto Maple Leafs on January 1, 2017. It was a white jersey that had four stripes on the arms. Three of the stripes were red, while the fourth was silver. On the silver stripes were the years the Red Wings won the Stanley Cup. The logo and numbers were outlined in silver.

The Red Wings' logo received significant media attention in August 2017 when it was discovered that a white supremacist group used a modified version of it, in which the wheel's spokes consisted of the occult SS symbol Black Sun; it was the aegis of their shields during the Unite the Right rally in Charlottesville, Virginia. As a result, the Red Wings condemned the group for the usage of the logo and threatened legal action.

For the 2020–21 season, the Red Wings wore special "Reverse Retro" alternate jerseys designed by Adidas. The uniform featured a white base and white sleeves inspired by the Red Wings' road uniforms of the Original Six era. Silver stripes replaced red stripes in commemoration of the team's 11 Stanley Cup championships and the 2017 Centennial Classic. A second "Reverse Retro" uniform was unveiled in the 2022–23 season, using the 1991–92 throwback uniform based on the original Cougars' uniforms but with a red base and black stripes.

On February 29, 2024, the Red Wings announced their first ever jersey patch advertisement with Priority, a local waste management company.

For the Red Wings' appearance in the 2025 Stadium Series, they wore white uniforms with a script "Detroit" lettering in red. The lower sleeves and socks were predominantly red, and the trademark "winged wheel" logo is on the left shoulder. The "Hockeytown" slogan was placed on the right leg. The uniforms were generally inspired by Detroit's automotive industry and hockey culture.

On September 15, 2025, the Red Wings unveiled their commemorative red and vintage white centennial season uniform, featuring visual nods from Detroit Cougars and Falcons designs, lace-up collars, and an original chain-stitched version of the "Winged Wheel" crest.

On September 18, 2026, the Red Wings announced a new jersey patch sponsorship with DQS Solutions & Staffing. On November 2, 2026, the Red Wings unveiled a "Hometown Remix" uniform, essentially their current red uniform but with a "HOCKEYTOWN" wordmark atop the winged wheel crest, additional striping and modernized letters.

=== Fan traditions ===
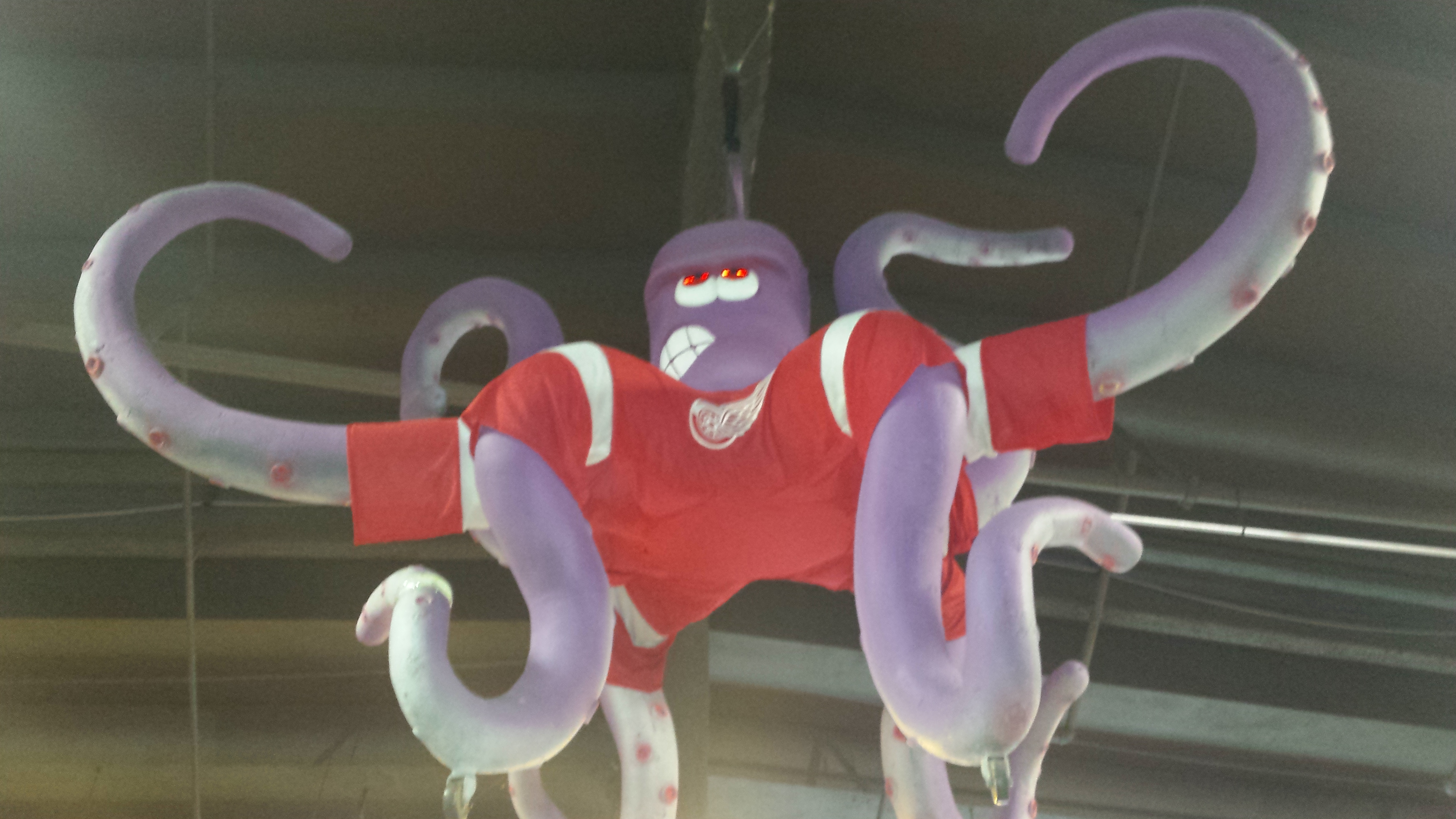
During the playoffs, Joe Louis Arena was adorned with a giant octopus, nicknamed Al. This stems from a fan tradition.

The "Legend of the Octopus" is a sports tradition during Detroit Red Wings playoff games, in which an octopus is thrown onto the ice surface for good luck. During the playoffs, Joe Louis Arena was generally adorned with a giant octopus with red eyes, nicknamed "Al" after former head ice manager Al Sobotka.

The 1952 playoffs featured the start of the octopus throw. The owner of a local fish market, Peter Cusimano, threw one from the stands onto the ice. The eight legs are symbolic of the eight wins it took to win the Stanley Cup at the time. The Red Wings went on to sweep both of their opponents that year en route to a Stanley Cup championship. The NHL has, at various times, tried to eliminate this tradition but it continues to this day.

Sobotka was responsible for removing the thrown creatures from the ice. When the Red Wings played at Joe Louis Arena, he was known for swinging the tossed octopuses above his head when walking off the ice. On April 19, 2008, the NHL sent a memo to the Red Wings that forbade this; they said that violating the mandate would result in a $10,000 fine. Instead, it was to up to the linesmen to remove the octopuses. In an email to the Detroit Free Press, NHL spokesman Frank Brown justified the ban because matter flew off the octopus and got on the ice when Sobotka swung it above his head. This ban was later loosened to allow for the octopus twirling to take place at the Zamboni entrance.

Typically right after the final horn sounds at the end of third period confirming the Red Wings have won their game, especially around the end of the season and during the playoffs, fans are known to start singing along to Journey's "Don't Stop Believin'". The song is played over the PA system and continues until it is muted while the crowd sings the words "Born and raised in South Detroit," then the song resumes over the speakers in the arena.

== Broadcasters ==
The Red Wings' flagship radio station is WXYT-FM 97.1. If there is a conflict with Detroit Tigers baseball or Detroit Lions football, games are carried on WWJ 950. There are several affiliate stations throughout Michigan.

The Red Wings' regional broadcasts air on Detroit SportsNet.

Announcers:

- Ken Daniels: Television play by play announcer.
- Mickey Redmond: Television color commentator (home games and select away games).
- Stu Grimson: Television and radio color commentator (primary commentator for games Redmond does not attend and select games on radio).
- Chris Osgood: Studio analyst and radio color commentator (select games).
- Larry Murphy: Studio analyst and radio color commentator (select games).
- Trevor Thompson: Television pre-game and post-game host and reporter.
- Daniella Bruce: Television pre-game and post-game host and reporter.
- Logan Reever: Television pre-game and post-game host and reporter.
- Ken Kal: Radio play by play announcer.
- Jeff Riger: Primary radio intermission and post-game host.

=== Honored broadcasters ===
Four members of the Red Wings organization have received the Foster Hewitt Memorial Award:

- Budd Lynch: TV and radio play by play and color – 1949–1975 (awarded 1985)
- Bruce Martyn: Radio play by play – 1964–1995 (awarded 1991)
- Mickey Redmond: TV color commentary – 1979–1981, 1986–present (awarded 2011)
- Dave Strader: TV play by play – 1985–1996 (awarded 2017)

Lynch called the first locally televised game at Olympia for the original WWJ-TV in 1949. He remained with the organization for 63 years, serving as director of publicity from 1975 to 1982, and was the public address announcer from 1982 until his death in 2012. From 2008 to 2012, a second PA announcer was added to work alongside him, first John Fossen, then Erich Freiny. Freiny took over as the sole PA announcer following Lynch's death.

== Season-by-season record ==
This is a partial list of the last five seasons completed by the Detroit Red Wings. For the full season-by-season history, see List of Detroit Red Wings seasons.

Note: GP = Games played, W = Wins, L = Losses, T = Ties, OTL = Overtime losses, ROW = Regulation + OT wins, Pts = Points, GF = Goals for, GA = Goals against

Season	GP	W	L	OTL	Pts	GF	GA	Finish	Playoffs
2021–22	82	32	40	10	74	230	312	6th, Atlantic	Did not qualify
2022–23	82	35	37	10	80	240	279	7th, Atlantic	Did not qualify
2023–24	82	41	32	9	91	278	274	5th, Atlantic	Did not qualify
2024–25	82	39	35	8	86	238	259	6th, Atlantic	Did not qualify
2025–26	82	41	31	10	92	241	258	6th, Atlantic	Did not qualify

== Players and personnel ==
=== Current roster ===
Updated October 30, 2026

No.	Nat	Player	Pos	S/G	Age	Acquired	Birthplace
22	(United States)	Mason Appleton	C	R	30	2025	Green Bay, Wisconsin
33	(Sweden)	Viktor Arvidsson	RW	R	33	2026	Kusmark, Sweden
25	(Canada)	Jacob Bernard-Docker	D	R	26	2025	Canmore, Alberta
28	(Norway)	Michael Brandsegg-Nygård	RW	R	21	2024	Oslo, Norway
8	(Canada)	Ben Chiarot	D	L	35	2022	Hamilton, Ontario
37	(United States)	J. T. Compher	LW	R	31	2023	Northbrook, Illinois
18	(United States)	Andrew Copp	C	L	32	2022	Ann Arbor, Michigan
29	(Canada)	Nate Danielson	C	R	22	2023	Red Deer, Alberta
93	(United States)	Alex DeBrincat (A)	RW	R	28	2023	Farmington Hills, Michigan
15	(United States)	Sheldon Dries	C	L	32	2024	Macomb Township, Michigan
77	(Sweden)	Simon Edvinsson (RFA)	D	L	23	2021	Onsala, Sweden
24	(Sweden)	Andreas Englund	D	L	30	2026	Stockholm, Sweden
72	(United States)	Justin Faulk	D	R	34	2026	South St. Paul, Minnesota
58	(Canada)	Emmitt Finnie	LW	L	21	2023	Lethbridge, Alberta
36	(United States)	John Gibson	G	L	33	2025	Pittsburgh, Pennsylvania
20	(Sweden)	Albert Johansson	D	L	25	2019	Karlstad, Sweden
42	(Sweden)	Anton Johansson	D	R	22	2022	Stockholm, Sweden
92	(Austria)	Marco Kasper	C	L	22	2022	Innsbruck, Austria
55	(Canada)	Keegan Kolesar	RW	R	29	2026	Brandon, Manitoba
71	(United States)	Dylan Larkin	C	L	30	2014	Waterford, Michigan
34	(United States)	Carter Mazur	LW	R	24	2021	Jackson, Michigan
27	(Canada)	Michael Rasmussen	C	L	27	2017	Vancouver, British Columbia
23	(Sweden)	Lucas Raymond (A)	LW	R	24	2020	Gothenburg, Sweden
53	(Germany)	Moritz Seider (A)	D	R	25	2019	Zell, Germany
80	(Russia)	Daniil Tarasov	G	L	27	2026	Novokuznetsk, Russia
54	(Sweden)	William Wallinder	D	L	24	2020	Sollefteå, Sweden

=== Hall of Fame ===
The Detroit Red Wings acknowledge an affiliation with many inductees to the Hockey Hall of Fame, including 68 former players and 12 builders of the sport. The 12 individuals recognized as builders by the Hall of Fame include former Red Wings executives, general managers, head coaches, and owners. In addition to players and builders, several broadcasters have been awarded the Foster Hewitt Memorial Award from the Hockey Hall of Fame. Budd Lynch, a radio play-by-play announcer, was the first Red Wings broadcaster to be awarded the Foster Hewitt Memorial Award. Lynch also served as Detroit's public address announcer from 1985 until his death in 2012. In addition to Lynch, Bruce Martyn, Mickey Redmond, and Dave Strader have also won the award.

Players

- Sid Abel
- Daniel Alfredsson
- Al Arbour
- Marty Barry
- Andy Bathgate
- Leo Boivin
- John Bucyk
- Chris Chelios
- Dino Ciccarelli
- Paul Coffey
- Charlie Conacher
- Roy Conacher
- Alec Connell
- Pavel Datsyuk
- Alex Delvecchio
- Marcel Dionne
- Bernie Federko
- Sergei Fedorov
- Viacheslav Fetisov
- Frank Foyston
- Frank Fredrickson
- Bill Gadsby
- Eddie Giacomin
- Ebbie Goodfellow
- Glenn Hall
- Doug Harvey
- Dominik Hašek
- George Hay
- Hap Holmes
- Marián Hossa
- Gordie Howe
- Mark Howe
- Syd Howe
- Brett Hull
- Duke Keats
- Red Kelly
- Brian Kilrea
- Igor Larionov
- Herbie Lewis
- Nicklas Lidström
- Ted Lindsay
- Harry Lumley
- Frank Mahovlich
- Mike Modano
- Larry Murphy
- Václav Nedomanský
- Reg Noble
- Adam Oates
- Brad Park
- Bud Poile
- Marcel Pronovost
- Bill Quackenbush
- Luc Robitaille
- Borje Salming
- Terry Sawchuk
- Earl Seibert
- Brendan Shanahan
- Darryl Sittler
- Jack Stewart
- Tiny Thompson
- Norm Ullman
- Rogie Vachon
- Mike Vernon
- Carl Voss
- Jack Walker
- Harry Watson
- Cooney Weiland
- Steve Yzerman

Builders

- Jack Adams
- Keith Allen (Note: Inductee only played for the Red Wings, and was not a team executive or a member of the coaching staff. Despite their induction in the builders category, the team continues to acknowledge an affiliation with the Hall of Fame member.)
- Scotty Bowman
- Murray Costello
- Jim Devellano
- Ken Holland
- Mike Ilitch
- Tommy Ivan
- Bruce Norris
- James D. Norris
- James E. Norris
- John Ziegler Jr.

=== Retired numbers ===
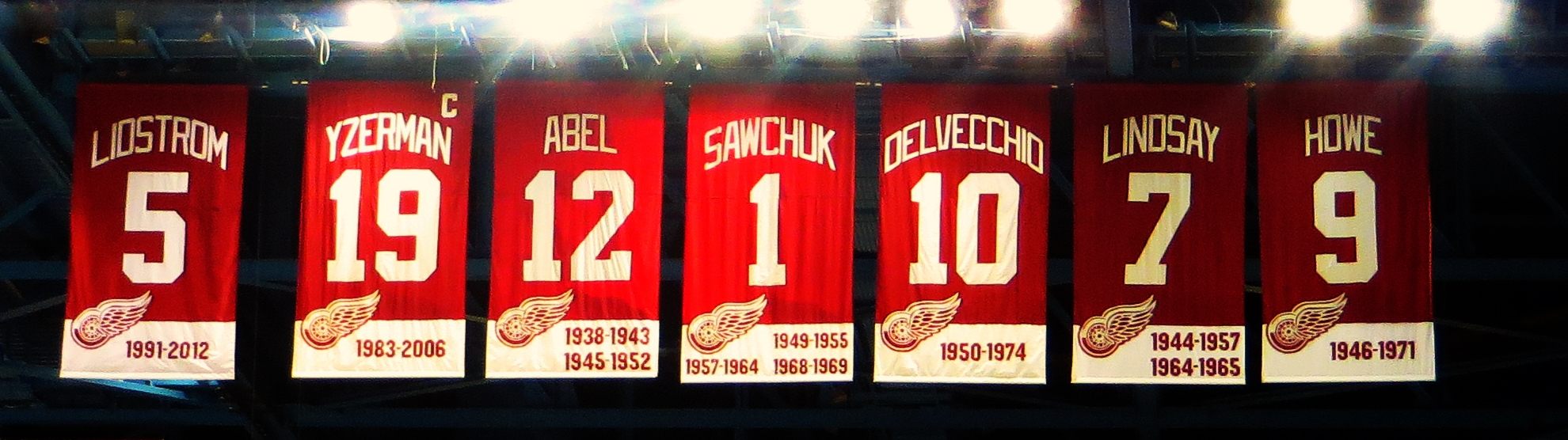
The banners of retired numbers hanging at Joe Louis Arena.

Detroit Red Wings retired numbers
No.	Player	Position	Career	Number retirement
1	Terry Sawchuk	G	1949–1955; 1957–1964; 1968–1969	March 6, 1994
4	Red Kelly	D	1947–1960	February 1, 2019
5	Nicklas Lidström	D	1991–2012	March 6, 2014
7	Ted Lindsay (Note: Lindsay wore the No. 7 in his first tenure prior to being traded to Chicago. When he returned in 1964, Norm Ullman was wearing the No. 7 (which he wore from 1959 to 1968), so Lindsay wore the No. 15.)	LW	1944–1957; 1964–1965	November 10, 1991
9	Gordie Howe	RW	1946–1971	March 12, 1972
10	Alex Delvecchio	C	1950–1974	November 10, 1991
12	Sid Abel	C	1938–1943; 1945–1952	April 29, 1995
19	Steve Yzerman (Note: The banner features the captain "C" to honor his 20 years as team captain with the Red Wings.)	C	1983–2006	January 2, 2007
91	Sergei Fedorov	C	1990–2003	January 12, 2026

The Red Wings have retired nine numbers. The first number the Red Wings retired was No. 9 in 1972 in honor of Gordie Howe, who played right wing for the team from 1946 to 1971. Howe won both the Art Ross Trophy and the Hart Memorial Trophy six times each and won the Stanley Cup as a Red Wing four times. The next jersey retirements was on November 10, 1991 with the dual retirement of Ted Lindsay's No. 7 and Alex Delvecchio's No. 10. A three-time Stanley Cup champion, Delvecchio recorded over 1,200 points in 1,549 games, all spent with Detroit as the first player to spend 1,500 games with one franchise. As a part of the Production Line, Lindsay (who wore No. 7 in his first tenure prior to being traded) won the Art Ross Trophy once and the Stanley Cup four times while being a key organizer of the first attempted players association for NHL players.

In 2007, the Red Wings retired Steve Yzerman's No. 19. During Yzerman's career, he won the Bill Masterton Memorial Trophy, the Conn Smythe Trophy, the Frank J. Selke Trophy, the Lester Patrick Trophy, and the Ted Lindsay Award. Yzerman served as Detroit's captain for 19 seasons, an NHL record, and won the Stanley Cup three times as a player with the Red Wings. The franchise retired Red Kelly's No. 4 on February 1, 2019. During Kelly's 13-year career with the Red Wings, he won four Stanley Cups, the Lady Byng Memorial Trophy three times, and the James Norris Memorial Trophy once. The franchise's most recent retired number is Sergei Fedorov's No. 91, with the ceremony taking place on January 12, 2026. During his 13-year career with the Red Wings, Fedorov won the Frank J. Selke Trophy twice, the Hart Memorial Trophy and Ted Lindsay Award once, and the Stanley Cup three times.

The Red Wings have also taken the number 6 of Larry Aurie and the number 16 of Vladimir Konstantinov out of circulation. However, the numbers are not considered to be officially retired. Although Aurie's number was retired in 1938 by James E. Norris, the Ilitch family does not consider the number to be retired. Konstantinov's number has not been issued to any player since he was permanently disabled in a vehicle accident after the 1997 Stanley Cup Final. Number 99 is also unavailable as it was retired by the league in honor of Wayne Gretzky.

=== Team captains ===
All the players who have served as team captain with the Detroit franchise.

- Art Duncan, 1926–1927
- Reg Noble, 1927–1930
- George Hay, 1930–1931
- Carson Cooper, 1931–1932
- Larry Aurie, 1932–1933
- Herbie Lewis, 1933–1934
- Ebbie Goodfellow, 1934–1935, 1938–1941
- Doug Young, 1935–1938
- Ebbie Goodfellow and Syd Howe, 1941–1942
- Sid Abel, 1942–1943
- Mud Bruneteau and Flash Hollett, 1943–1944
- Flash Hollett, 1944–1945
- Flash Hollett and Sid Abel, 1945–1946
- Sid Abel, 1946–1952
- Ted Lindsay, 1952–1956
- Red Kelly, 1956–1958
- Gordie Howe, 1958–1962
- Alex Delvecchio, 1962–1973
- Alex Delvecchio, Nick Libett, Red Berenson, Gary Bergman, Ted Harris, Mickey Redmond, and Larry Johnston, 1973–1974
- Marcel Dionne, 1974–1975
- Danny Grant and Terry Harper, 1975–1976
- Danny Grant and Dennis Polonich, 1976–1977
- Dan Maloney and Dennis Hextall, 1977–1978
- Dennis Hextall, Nick Libett, and Paul Woods, 1978–1979
- Dale McCourt, 1979–1980
- Errol Thompson and Reed Larson, 1980–1981
- Reed Larson, 1981–1982
- Danny Gare, 1982–1986
- Steve Yzerman, 1986–2006
- Nicklas Lidström, 2006–2012
- Henrik Zetterberg, 2013–2018
- Dylan Larkin, 2021–2026

=== First-round draft picks ===
- 1963: Peter Mahovlich (2nd overall)
- 1964: Claude Gauthier (1st overall)
- 1965: George Forgie (3rd overall)
- 1966: Steve Atkinson (6th overall)
- 1967: Ron Barkwell (9th overall)
- 1968: Steve Andrascik (11th overall)
- 1969: Jim Rutherford (10th overall)
- 1970: Serge Lajeunesse (12th overall)
- 1971: Marcel Dionne (2nd overall)
- 1973: Terry Richardson (11th overall)
- 1974: Bill Lochead (9th overall)
- 1975: Rick Lapointe (5th overall)
- 1976: Fred Williams (4th overall)
- 1977: Dale McCourt (1st overall)
- 1978: Willie Huber (9th overall)
- 1979: Mike Foligno (3rd overall)
- 1980: Mike Blaisdell (11th overall)
- 1982: Murray Craven (17th overall)
- 1983: Steve Yzerman (4th overall)
- 1984: Shawn Burr (7th overall)
- 1985: Brent Fedyk (8th overall)
- 1986: Joe Murphy (1st overall)
- 1987: Yves Racine (11th overall)
- 1988: Kory Kocur (17th overall)
- 1989: Mike Sillinger (11th overall)
- 1990: Keith Primeau (3rd overall)
- 1991: Martin Lapointe (10th overall)
- 1992: Curtis Bowen (22nd overall)
- 1993: Anders Eriksson (22nd overall)
- 1994: Yan Golubovsky (23rd overall)
- 1995: Maxim Kuznetsov (26th overall)
- 1996: Jesse Wallin (26th overall)
- 1998: Jiří Fischer (25th overall)
- 2000: Niklas Kronwall (29th overall)
- 2005: Jakub Kindl (19th overall)
- 2007: Brendan Smith (27th overall)
- 2008: Thomas McCollum (30th overall)
- 2010: Riley Sheahan (21st overall)
- 2013: Anthony Mantha (20th overall)
- 2014: Dylan Larkin (15th overall)
- 2015: Evgeny Svechnikov (19th overall)
- 2016: Dennis Cholowski (20th overall)
- 2017: Michael Rasmussen (9th overall)
- 2018: Filip Zadina (6th overall)
- 2018: Joe Veleno (30th overall)
- 2019: Moritz Seider (6th overall)
- 2020: Lucas Raymond (4th overall)
- 2021: Simon Edvinsson (6th overall)
- 2021: Sebastian Cossa (15th overall)
- 2022: Marco Kasper (8th overall)
- 2023: Nate Danielson (9th overall)
- 2023: Axel Sandin Pellikka (17th overall)
- 2024: Michael Brandsegg-Nygård (15th overall)
- 2025: Carter Bear (13th overall)
- 2026: JP Hurlbert (23rd overall)

== Franchise records ==
=== Scoring leaders ===
These players rank in the top ten in franchise history in scoring as of the end of the 2025–26 season. Figures are updated after each completed NHL season.

- * – current Red Wings player

Note: Pos = Position; GP = Games played; G = Goals; A = Assists; Pts = Points; P/G = Points per game

Points
Player	Pos	GP	G	A	Pts	P/G
Gordie Howe	RW	1,687	786	1,023	1,809	1.07
Steve Yzerman	C	1,514	692	1,063	1,755	1.16
Alex Delvecchio	C	1,550	456	825	1,281	.83
Nicklas Lidström	D	1,564	264	878	1,142	.73
Henrik Zetterberg	C	1,082	337	623	960	.89
Sergei Fedorov	C	908	400	554	954	1.05
Pavel Datsyuk	C	953	314	604	918	.96
Norm Ullman	C	875	324	434	758	.87
Ted Lindsay	LW	862	335	393	728	.84
Dylan Larkin*	C	808	276	367	643	.80

Goals
Player	Pos	G
Gordie Howe	RW	786
Steve Yzerman	C	692
Alex Delvecchio	C	456
Sergei Fedorov	C	400
Henrik Zetterberg	C	337
Ted Lindsay	LW	335
Norm Ullman	C	324
Pavel Datsyuk	C	314
Brendan Shanahan	LW	309
Dylan Larkin*	C	276

Assists
Player	Pos	A
Steve Yzerman	C	1,063
Gordie Howe	RW	1,023
Nicklas Lidström	D	878
Alex Delvecchio	C	825
Henrik Zetterberg	C	623
Pavel Datsyuk	C	604
Sergei Fedorov	C	554
Norm Ullman	C	434
Ted Lindsay	LW	393
Reed Larson	D	382

=== Goaltending leaders ===
These goaltenders rank in the top ten in franchise history for wins as of the end of the 2025–26 season. Figures are updated after each completed NHL season.

- * – current Red Wings player

Note: GP = Games played; W = Wins; L = Losses; T/O = Ties/Overtime losses; GA = Goals against; GAA = Goals against average; SA = Shots against; SV% = Save percentage; SO = Shutouts

Goaltenders
Player	GP	W	L	T/O	GA	GAA	SA	SV%	SO
Terry Sawchuk	734	351	243	132	1,770	2.44	11,479	—	85
Chris Osgood	565	317	149	75	1,344	2.49	14,145	.905	39
Jimmy Howard	543	246	196	70	1,343	2.62	15,313	.912	24
Harry Lumley	324	163	105	56	890	2.75	—	—	26
Roger Crozier	310	131	118	43	853	2.93	8,855	.904	19
Tim Cheveldae	264	128	93	30	851	3.40	7,245	.883	9
Greg Stefan	299	115	127	30	1,068	3.93	8,096	.868	5
Dominik Hašek	176	114	39	19	368	2.13	4,142	.911	20
Manny Legace	180	112	34	19	368	2.18	4,473	.918	13
Jim Rutherford	314	97	165	43	1,114	3.69	8,988	.876	10

=== Individual records ===
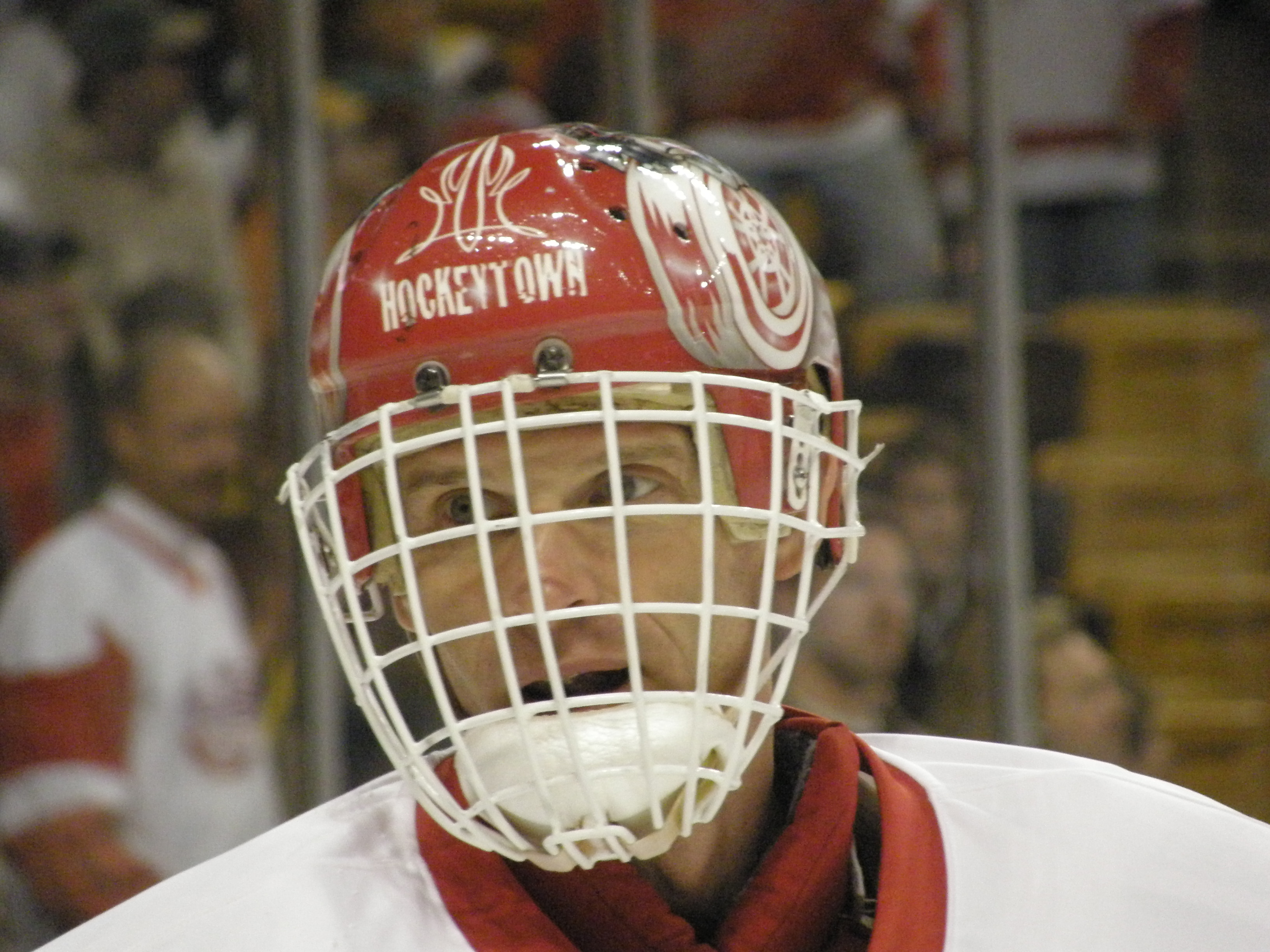
Recording six shutouts during the 2002 playoffs, Dominik Hašek set the franchise record for the most shutouts in a single postseason.

- Most goals in a season: 65, Steve Yzerman (1988–89)
- Most assists in a season: 90, Steve Yzerman (1988–89)
- Most points in a season: 155, Steve Yzerman (1988–89)
- Most penalty minutes in a season: 398, Bob Probert (1987–88)
- Most points in a season, defenseman: 80, Nicklas Lidström (2005–06)
- Most points in a season, rookie: 87, Steve Yzerman (1983–84)
- Most wins in a season: 44, Terry Sawchuk (1950–51 and 1951–52)
- Most shutouts in a season: 12, Terry Sawchuk (1951–52, 1953–54, and 1954–55) and Glenn Hall (1955–56)
- Most shutouts in postseason: 6, Dominik Hašek (2002)
- Longest home win streak in NHL history: 23 games (November 5, 2011, to February 19, 2012)
- Most wins in a season in franchise history: 62 (1995–96)

== See also ==
- Grind Line
- Lists of NHL players
- List of NHL seasons
- List of Stanley Cup champions

== Notes ==
Preceded by Montreal Maroons	Stanley Cup champions 1935–36, 1936–37	Succeeded by Chicago Black Hawks
Preceded by Toronto Maple Leafs	Stanley Cup champions 1942–43	Succeeded by Montreal Canadiens
Preceded by Toronto Maple Leafs	Stanley Cup champions 1949–50	Succeeded by Toronto Maple Leafs
Preceded by Toronto Maple Leafs	Stanley Cup champions 1951–52	Succeeded by Montreal Canadiens
Preceded by Montreal Canadiens	Stanley Cup champions 1953–54, 1954–55	Succeeded by Montreal Canadiens
Preceded by Colorado Avalanche	Stanley Cup champions 1996–97, 1997–98	Succeeded by Dallas Stars
Preceded by Colorado Avalanche	Stanley Cup champions 2001–02	Succeeded by New Jersey Devils
Preceded by Anaheim Ducks	Stanley Cup champions 2007–08	Succeeded by Pittsburgh Penguins
