= Sobotka (surname) =

Sobotka (feminine: Sobotková) is a Czech surname. It was derived either from the Czech word sobota (i.e. 'Saturday') or from the town of Sobotka. A Germanised form of the surname is Sobottka. Notable people with the surname include:

- Al Sobotka, American building operations manager
- Alois Sobotka (1904–1977), Czech athlete
- Bohuslav Sobotka, (born 1971), Czech politician
- Chad Sobotka (born 1993), American baseball player
- Elisabeth Sobotka (born 1965), Austrian opera director
- Iwona Sobotka (born 1981), Polish opera singer
- Jan Sobotka (born 1961), Czech politician
- Jiří Sobotka (1911–1994), Czech footballer
- Joel Sobotka (born 1970), American basketball coach
- Lee G. Sobotka, American physicist
- Paul Alan Sobotka, American medical doctor
- Petr Sobotka (born 1975), Czech weightlifter
- Přemysl Sobotka (born 1944), Czech medical doctor and politician
- Ruth Sobotka (1925–1967), Austrian-American dancer and costume designer
- Vladimír Sobotka (born 1987), Czech ice hockey player
- Wolfgang Sobotka (born 1956), Austrian politician
- Zdeněk Sobotka (1917–2001), Czech athlete

== Fictional characters ==
- Frank Sobotka, a character from the television show The Wire
- Nick Sobotka, a character from the television show The Wire
- Ziggy Sobotka, a character from the television show The Wire
