= Sobotka =

- Town
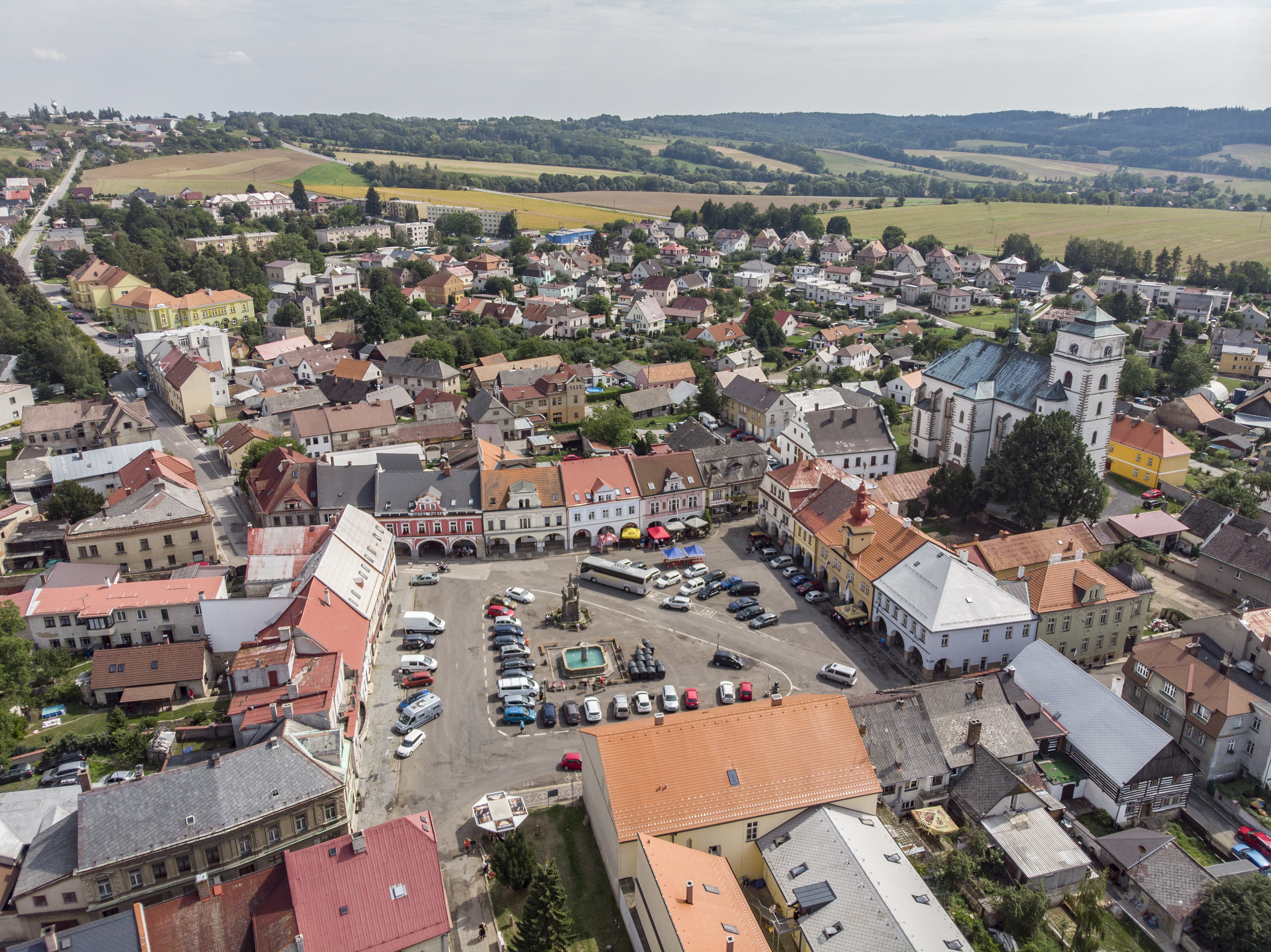
- Aerial view of the historic centre

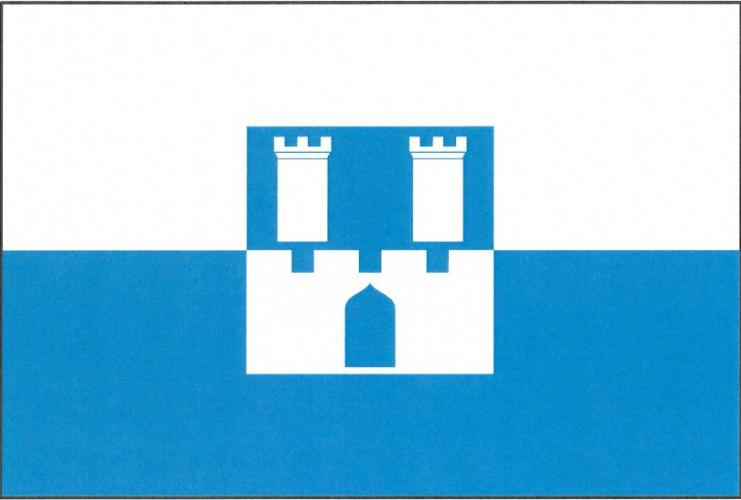
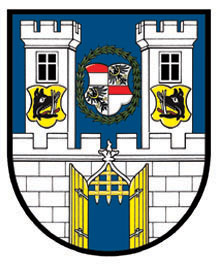
- Flag Coat of arms

- Location in the Czech Republic
- Coordinates: 50°28′3″N 15°10′35″E
- Country: Czech Republic
- Region: Hradec Králové
- District: Jičín
- First mentioned: 1322

Government
  - Mayor: Lubor Jenček (TOP 09)

Area
  - Total: 19.33 km^{2} (7.46 sq mi)
- Elevation: 305 m (1,001 ft)

Population (2026-01-01)
  - Total: 2,401
  - Density: 124.2/km^{2} (321.7/sq mi)
- Time zone: UTC+1 (CET)
  - Summer (DST): UTC+2 (CEST)
- Postal code: 507 43
- Website: www.sobotka.cz

Sobotka (Czech pronunciation: [ˈsobotka]) is a town in Jičín District in the Hradec Králové Region of the Czech Republic. It has about 2,400 inhabitants. The town is located in the Jičín Uplands.

The historic town centre is well preserved and is protected as an urban monument zone. The main landmark of the town is the Humprecht Castle, which is protected as a national cultural monument.

== Administrative division ==
Sobotka consists of nine municipal parts (in brackets population according to the 2021 census):

- Sobotka (1,986)
- Čálovice (48)
- Kdanice (49)
- Lavice (23)
- Spyšova (44)
- Staňkova Lhota (74)
- Stéblovice (28)
- Trní (14)
- Zajakury (34)

== Etymology ==
There are two theories about the origin of the name Sobotka. Either it was derived from the Czech word sobota (i.e. 'Saturday') because the settlement was granted the right to hold markets on Saturdays, or from the relatively common Czech surname Sobotka. However, it may be that the surname is derived from the name of the town.

== Geography ==
Sobotka is located about 13 kilometres (8 mi) northwest of Jičín and 62 km (39 mi) northeast of Prague. It lies in the Jičín Uplands. The highest point is at 393 m (1,289 ft) above sea level. The northern part of the municipal territory lies in the Bohemian Paradise Protected Landscape Area.

== History ==
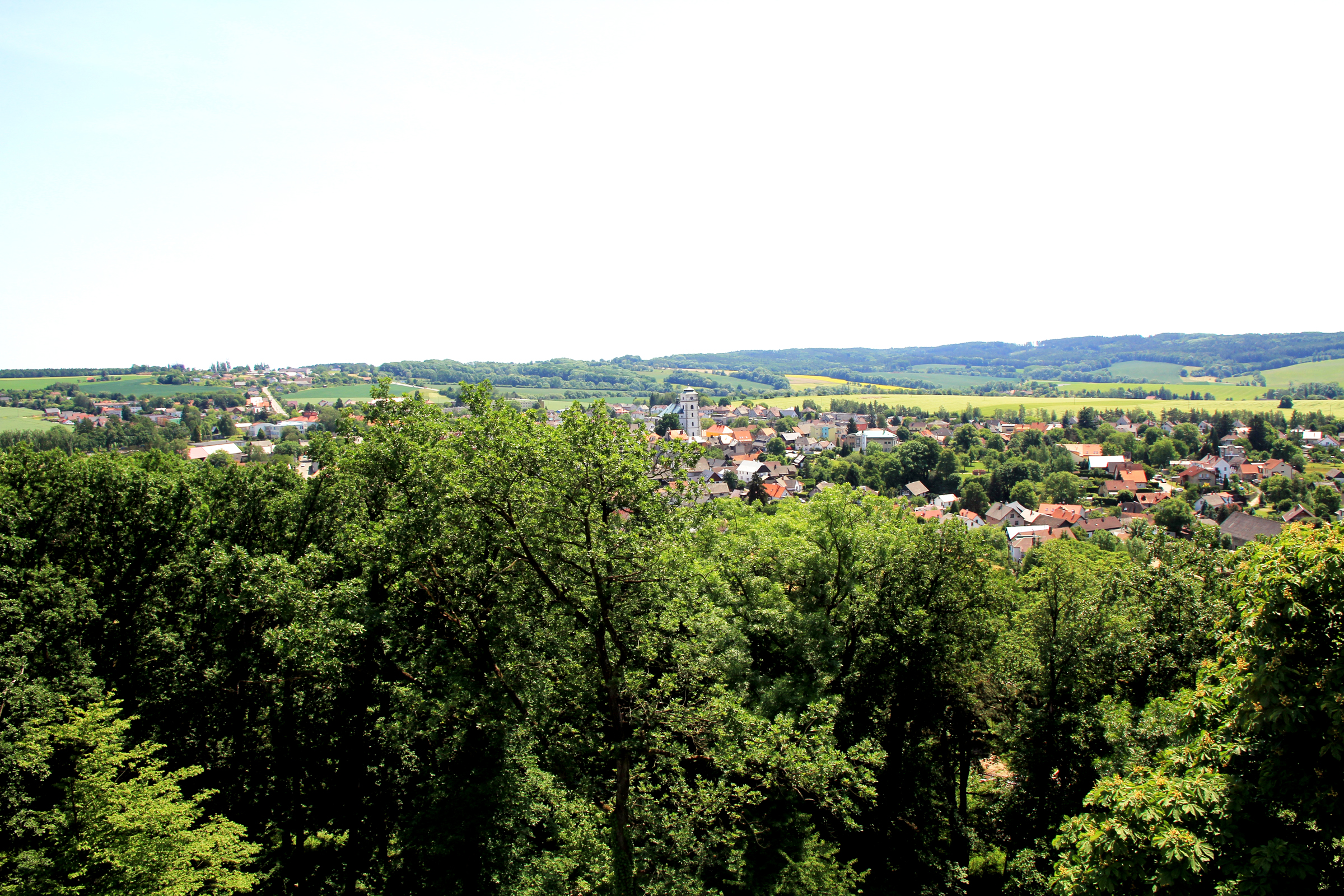
View of Sobotka from the north

The first written mention of Sobotka is from 1322. For centuries, it belonged to the Kost estate. In 1498, Sobotka was promoted to a town by Vladislaus II. The development of the town was hampered by frequent fires; the largest ones were in 1710, 1746 and 1825. In 1903, the railway was put into operation, but it did not bring an economic boom to the town.

== Demographics ==
Historical population

Year	Pop.	±%
1869	3,642	—
1880	3,642	+0.0%
1890	3,395	−6.8%
1900	3,381	−0.4%
1910	3,450	+2.0%

Year	Pop.	±%
1921	3,254	−5.7%
1930	3,098	−4.8%
1950	2,554	−17.6%
1961	2,568	+0.5%
1970	2,451	−4.6%

Year	Pop.	±%
1980	2,365	−3.5%
1991	2,287	−3.3%
2001	2,289	+0.1%
2011	2,413	+5.4%
2021	2,300	−4.7%

Source: Censuses

== Transport ==
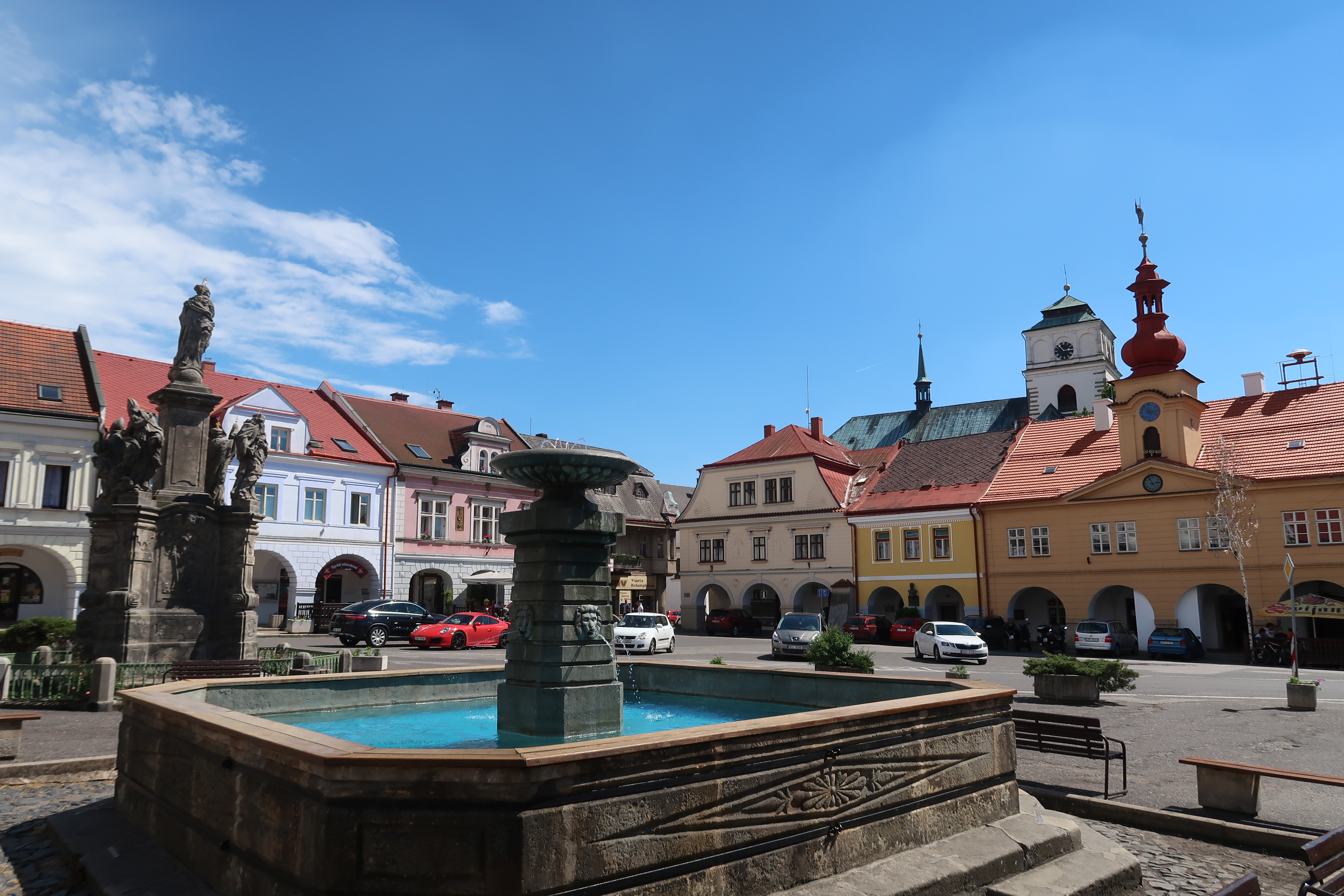
The square Náměstí Míru

The I/16 road (the section from Mladá Boleslav to Jičín) runs south of the town.

Sobotka is located on the railway line Mladá Boleslav–Mladějov.

== Culture ==
Since 1957, Sobotka hosts an annual festival of Czech language, speech and literature called Šrámkova Sobotka. The festival is named after the most famous local native, writer Fráňa Šrámek.

== Sights ==
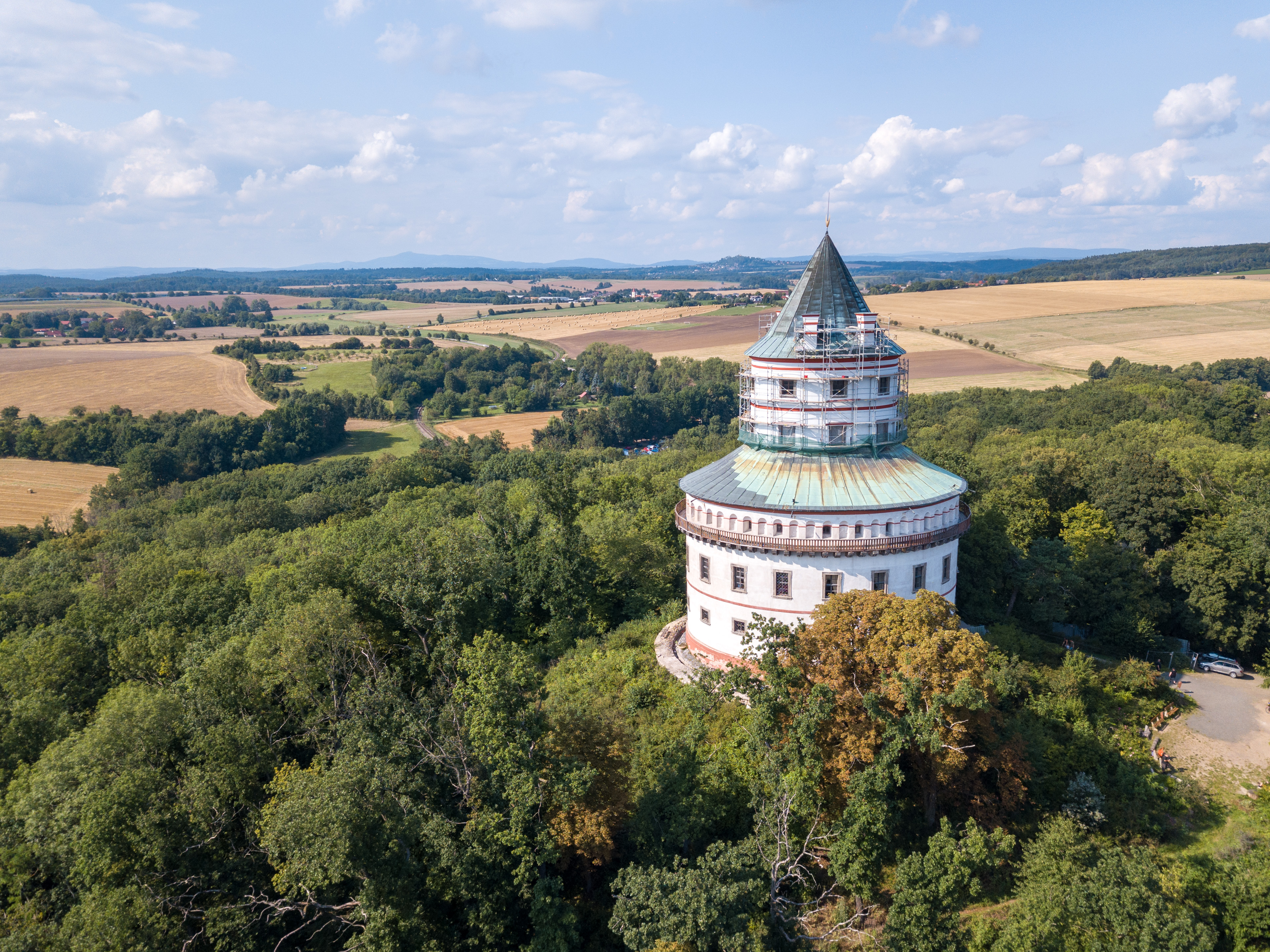
Humprecht Castle

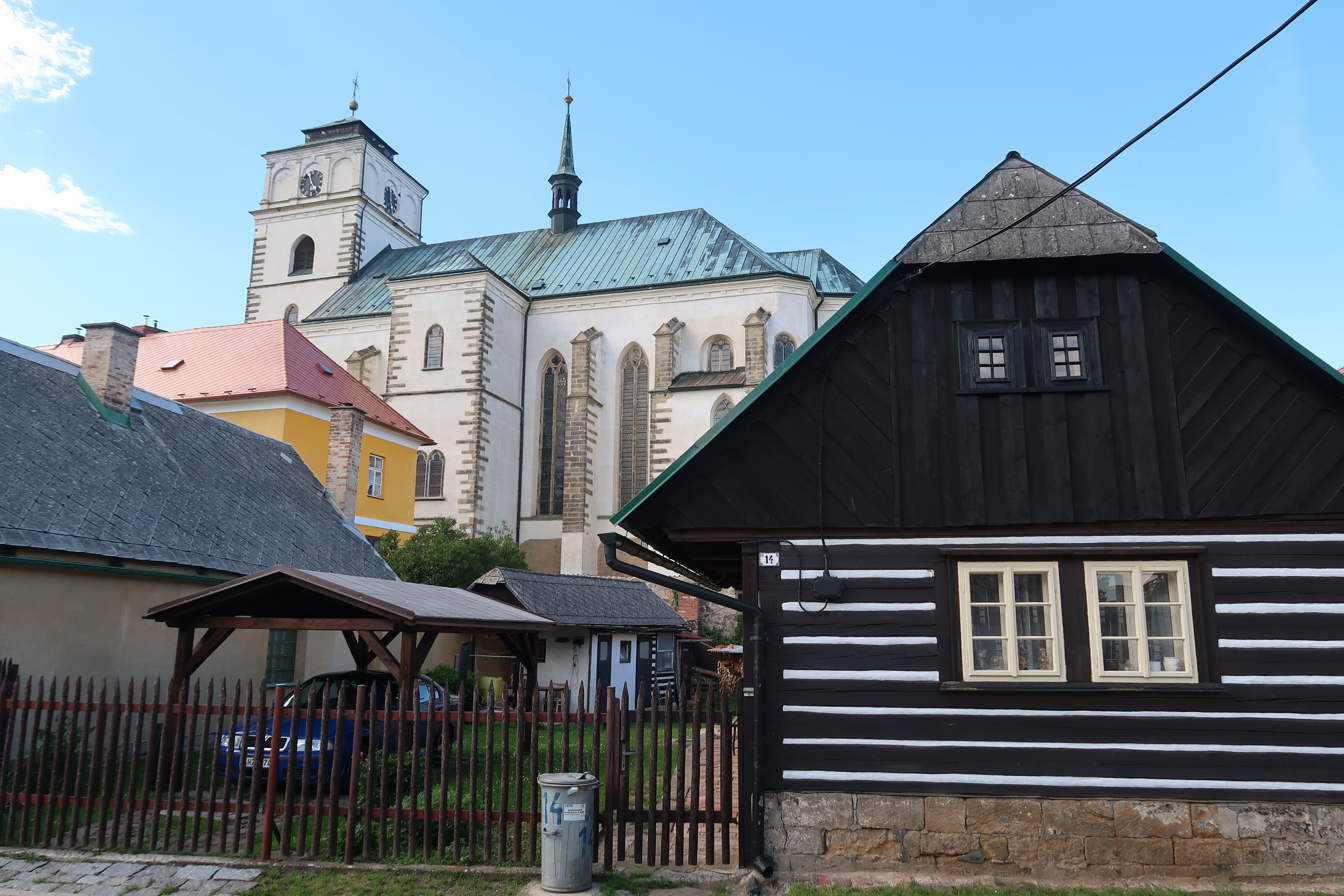
Church of Saint Mary Magdalene

The most valuable building is the Humprecht Castle, which is protected as a national cultural monument. It was built for Humprecht Jan Czernin by Italian architect Carlo Lurago in 1666–1668, as a summer house and hunting castle. It has atypical elliptical shape of its floor plan. It was damaged by the 1678 fire and in 1680, it was repaired and increased by one floor. Its appearance has not changed since then.

The historic centre is formed by the square Náměstí Míru. It is known for preserved burgher houses and former town hall. Behind the square there is the Church of Saint Mary Magdalene. It was built in the late Gothic style in 1590–1596, when it replaced an old wooden church from the 14th century. It has late Baroque interiors.

There are several preserved buildings of folk architecture in the town. The most notable is Šolc Farmhouse, dating from 1811.

== Notable people ==
- Fráňa Šrámek (1877–1952), writer

== Twin towns – sister cities ==
Sobotka is twinned with:

- Sobótka, Poland
- Wadern, Germany
