= Sobottka =

Sobottka is a German surname, a Germanised form of the Czech surname Sobotka. Notable people with the surname include:

- Gustav Sobottka (1886–1953), German politician
- Gustav Sobottka Jr. (1915–1940), German politician
- Marcel Sobottka (born 1994), German footballer
