= Al Sobotka =

American Zamboni driver

Al Sobotka is an American retired building operations manager, best known for operating the Zamboni at Detroit Red Wings home games. He worked for Olympia Entertainment for over 50 years, handling day-to-day operations at Joe Louis Arena, Cobo Arena, and Little Caesars Arena over the course of his career, until his firing in 2022.

Sobotka is known for collecting octopuses thrown onto the ice during Red Wings playoff games, a tradition among the team's fans. He is the namesake of the Red Wings' mascot, Al the Octopus.

== Career ==
Sobotka drove the Zamboni between periods at Joe Louis Arena for over 30 years until the arena's closure in the spring 2017. He continued driving the Zamboni between periods at the new Little Caesars Arena, beginning in the fall 2017 until his firing in March 2022. He is known for taking pride in his work, and he ensures that the arena's ice surface is of the highest quality. He said: "You know I'm particular, so if I see anything that's wrong -- a little chip of snow or something, you know, all that stuff matters a lot, 'cause a little snow can freeze and a guy hits it, never know what can happen, you know?" Brendan Shanahan said of Sobotka: "Al's very good and he takes it personally. I mean we see him a lot. Everybody knows Al. We're able to go out and make comments to him. He'll know when there's a tough night, you know, in the playoffs, or if it's a humid day and he'll respond accordingly. He'll ask the players after the game, 'What'd you think of the ice?'"

Detroit fans would often arrive before game time to watch Sobotka prepare the ice for a game. Children were able to compete for the chance to drive around with Sobotka between periods. Fans of all ages enjoyed his work, as did he. Interviews with Sobotka show his dedication to the craft and deep knowledge of ice preparation.

Sobotka started driving the Zamboni early in life, and when asked about his "dream job", he said: "It was just a job I got when I was in high school, and I kept at it, working in the maintenance department for a few years, [and] I still enjoy getting up in the morning. If you don't enjoy your work, it's hard getting up in the morning, you know?"

Sobotka came in second with 97,261 votes in Zamboni News' 1999 Zamboni "Driver of the Year" Award.

=== Dealing with octopuses ===
Sobotka is also famous for being the employee responsible for handling any octopuses thrown on the ice during Red Wings' games. Sobotka would grab the octopus with his bare hands and swing it around his head. He typically received an appreciative cheer from the crowd for this response.

In the April 2006 edition of Sports Illustrated, Michael Farber wrote:

The first face-offs [of the Stanley Cup tournament] were in Ottawa and Detroit at 7:12 p.m., although the unofficial commencement occurred two minutes earlier when an octopus landed on the ice with a splat during 'The Star-Spangled Banner' at the Wings' Joe Louis Arena. Nothing screams 'playoffs' like a cephalopod. (The Red Wings' tradition began in 1952 when two fishmongers realized that the number of tentacles on an octopus matched the number of wins then necessary to win the Stanley Cup.) Octopus-tossing is officially proscribed, but arena superintendent Al Sobotka tacitly encourages it by twirling octopuses over his head as he chugs off the ice after cleaning them up. In this year's playoff innovation, some Oilers fans threw hunks of prime Alberta beef onto the ice in response.

Sobotka said in 1996 that an unofficial record of 54 octopuses were thrown during one game of the 1995 Stanley Cup Finals series between Detroit Red Wings and New Jersey Devils. He also stated that Detroit fans throw an average of 25 octopuses per playoff game. For his tireless efforts, the Red Wings named their octopus mascot "Al" after Sobotka.

NHL rules prohibit fans from throwing objects onto the ice, and provide for a team supported to be assessed a delay of game penalty. However, the NHL historically did not enforce the rule in the Red Wings' case. As Frank Brown, the league's vice president for media relations, once said: "Every so often, an octopus slips out of someone's hands, and Al is right there to take care of the matter. And he cannot be blamed if, as it tries to break free from Al's grasp, the octopus lifts Al's arm and twirls itself in the air."

During the 2008 Stanley Cup playoffs, the NHL issued a warning that while they were fine with octopuses being thrown on the ice, the Red Wings would be fined $10,000 if Sobotka twirled the octopus in the air, as bits of the octopus would land on the ice and on the opposing goaltender. However, it was announced on May 7, 2008, that the NHL would allow Sobotka to twirl the octopuses, provided that he does so only at the Zamboni gate and not on the ice surface.

=== Firing ===
On March 30, 2022, Sobotka was fired by Olympia Entertainment, after he was reportedly seen openly urinating into a drain at Little Caesars Arena. Sobotka claimed he did so due to a prostate condition, and filed a lawsuit against Olympia alleging discrimination on the basis of his age and medical condition. Sobotka also claimed that the employee who reported his behavior was chosen to succeed him.
