= Sid Abel =

Canadian ice hockey player (1918–2000)

- Hockey Hall of Fame, 1969
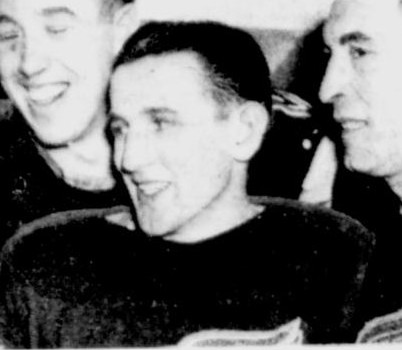
- Abel in 1943
- Born: February 22, 1918 Melville, Saskatchewan, Canada
- Died: February 8, 2000 (aged 81) Farmington Hills, Michigan, U.S.
- Height: 5 ft 11 in (180 cm)
- Weight: 170 lb (77 kg; 12 st 2 lb)
- Position: Centre
- Shot: Left
- Played for: Detroit Red Wings; Chicago Black Hawks
- Playing career: 1938–1954

Sidney Gerald Abel (February 22, 1918 – February 8, 2000) was a Canadian Hall of Fame hockey player, coach and general manager in the National Hockey League (NHL), most notably for the Detroit Red Wings, and was a member of Stanley Cup-winning teams in 1943, 1950, and 1952. In 2017, Abel was named one of the "100 Greatest NHL Players" in history.

== Playing career ==
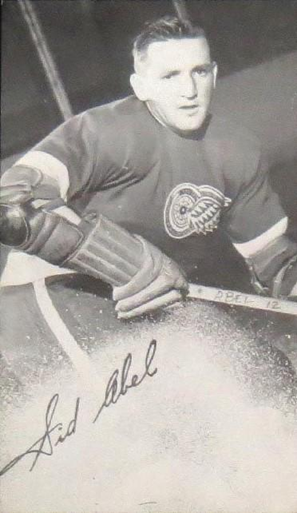
1948 postcard of Abel for Detroit Red Wings

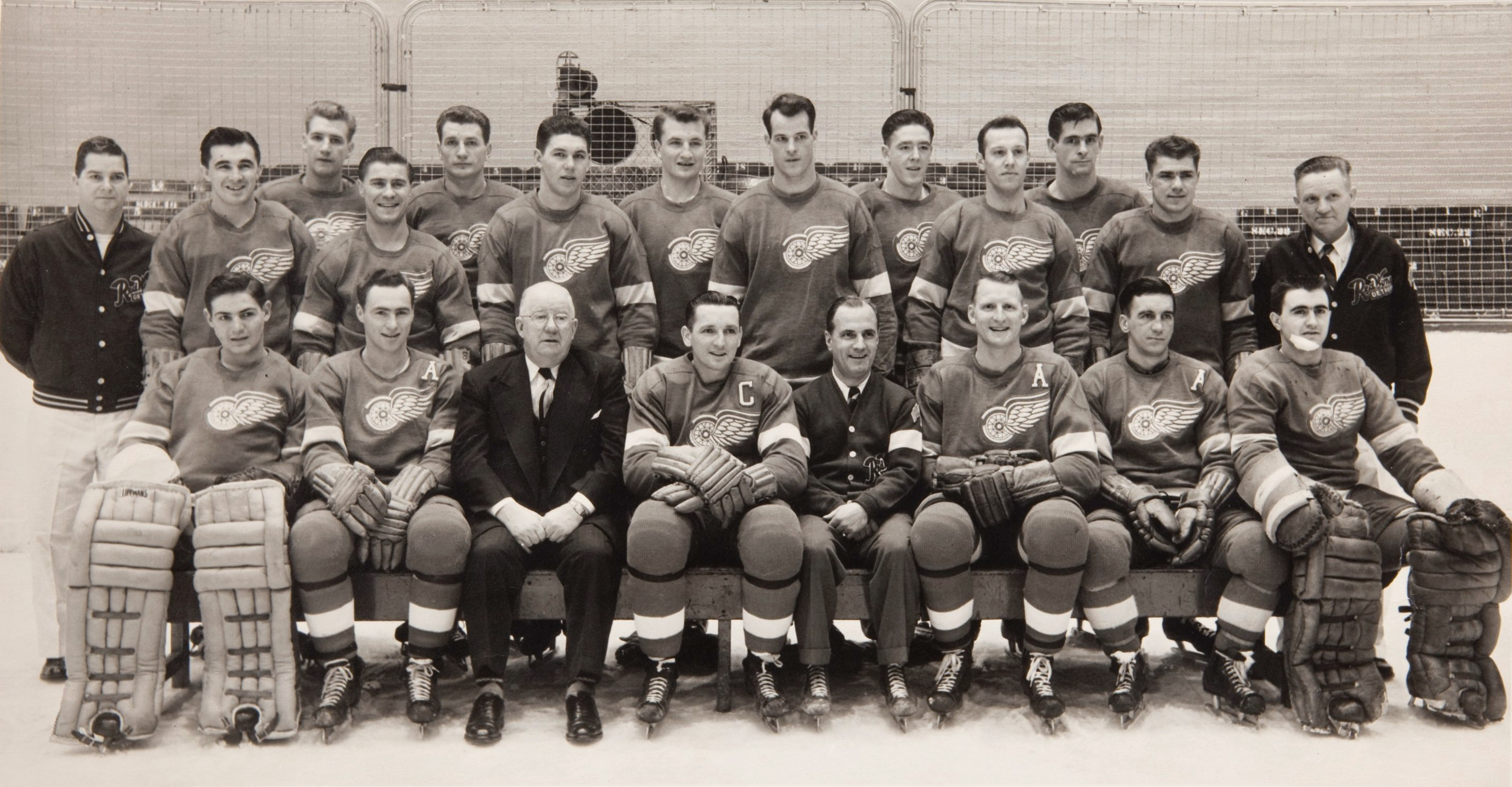
Team photo of the 1951–52 Detroit Red Wings with Abel in the front row wearing the captain's "C"

Born in Melville, Saskatchewan, Abel, or "Old Bootnose" as he was known, played junior hockey with the Flin Flon Bombers and joined the Red Wings in 1938. He split the next two seasons between the Red Wings and their affiliates in the International-American Hockey League before becoming a full-time player in 1940. He was named captain of the Red Wings in 1942.

In 1943, Abel left the Red Wings to serve with the Royal Canadian Air Force during World War II. During this time, he skated with the RCAF team in Montreal. Abel was demobilized late in the 1946 season; he rejoined the Red Wings just in time for the playoffs and regained the team captaincy.

In 1947, Red Wings' coach Jack Adams placed Abel and Ted Lindsay on a forward line with rookie right winger Gordie Howe. Although Abel was slowed down by an attack of pleurisy late that season, the line led the team to a playoff berth. The following season, Lindsay, Abel, and Howe finished first, third, and fourth respectively, in team scoring, and led the Red Wings to the Stanley Cup Final.

By the 1949 season, the newly dubbed "Production Line" led the Wings to the first of seven consecutive first-place finishes, an NHL record still standing today. However, Howe and Lindsay were hampered by severe injuries, which cost them much playing time. Abel was tied with Lindsay for third in NHL scoring and led the league in goals, and he recorded career highs in goals and assists. He was awarded the Hart Memorial Trophy as the league's Most Valuable Player, and was named to the First All-Star team.

The next three seasons saw Abel lead the Production Line over all other forward lines in points, and in 1949-50 Lindsay, Abel, and Howe finished in the top three in league scoring, equalling the feat of the famed "Kraut Line" of the Boston Bruins in 1939–40. In 1950, Abel was again named to the First All-Star team and won his second Stanley Cup, and in 1950, he was named Second Team All-Star.

Abel was sold to the Chicago Black Hawks in 1952, and was named coach of his new team. He served as player-coach for the next two seasons, the last full-time player-head coach in NHL history.

Though his No. 12 was honoured by the Wings, Abel also wore 4, 7, 9, 12, 14, 19, and 20 throughout his career. He wore most of these numbers during his first two seasons, when he split time between the Red Wings and the minors, before settling on number 12. He wore 9 after his return from the RCAF at the end of the 1945–46 season, as Joe Carveth had taken 12 during Abel's military service, and Abel regained 12 in 1946 when Carveth was traded to the Boston Bruins.

== Coaching ==
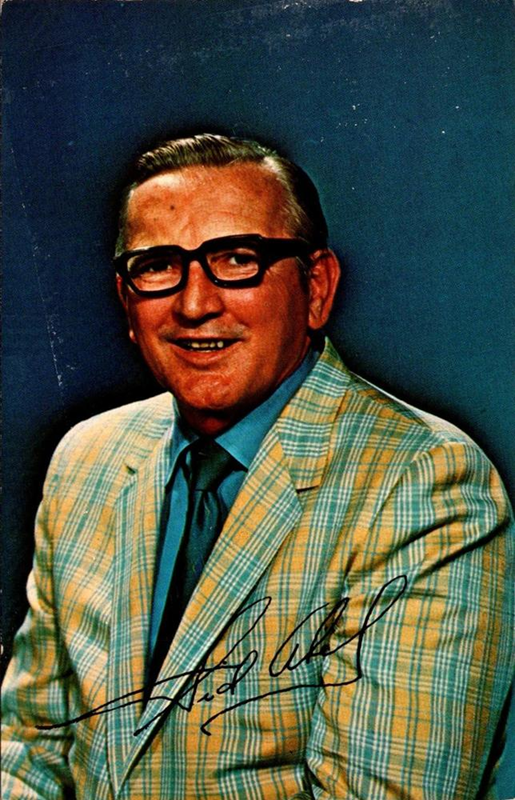
1971 postcard of Abel for St. Louis Blues

Abel was the head coach of the Chicago Black Hawks for two seasons from 1952 to 1954, which had one playoff appearance. He returned to the Red Wings in 1957–58 and served as Detroit's head coach through the 1967–68 season; he added GM duties in 1962. In eleven seasons, the Red Wings made the playoff seven times, which included a 1st place NHL finish in the 1964-65 season. Success in the Stanley Cup Final eluded the Wings, who lost in the Final four times under Abel (1961, 1963, 1964, 1966). He resigned as coach to focus on his GM duties, although he returned in the 1969–70 season after the first two games. He left in 1971. Later that year, he served as coach of the St. Louis Blues but was fired after ten games.

In 1974 Abel was named general manager of the expansion Kansas City Scouts and served through the 1975–76 season, after which the franchise relocated to Denver to become the Colorado Rockies. Abel served as coach of the Scouts for three games in 1975-76 following the resignation of Bep Guidolin.

In the 1970s and 1980s, Abel worked as a colour commentator on Red Wings radio and television broadcasts beside play-by-play announcer Bruce Martyn.

== Legacy ==
Sid Abel was elected to the Hockey Hall of Fame in 1969. In 1998, he was ranked 85 on The Hockey News' list of the 100 Greatest Hockey Players.

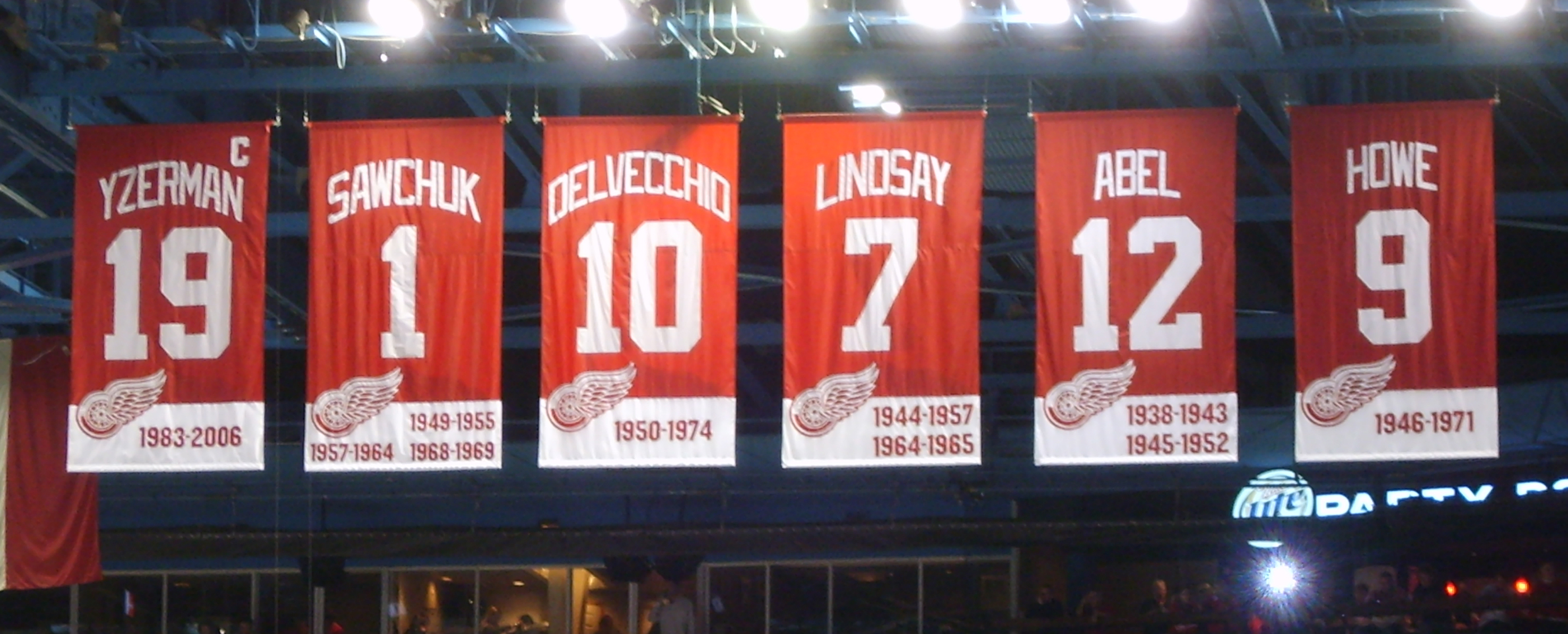
Abel's No. 12 banner hanging in Joe Louis Arena.

Abel's older brother George played for Canada's hockey team at the 1952 Olympics in Oslo, Norway. George scored the winning goal in the final game, securing the only gold medal for Canada that year. Sid's son Gerry played briefly in the NHL, Sid's daughter Linda Abel-Johnson's son and Sid's grandson Brent Johnson was a goaltender who played several years in the NHL. Sid's son-in-law Bob Johnson was also a goaltender in the NHL. His nephew Greg Abel is the current CEO of American company Berkshire Hathaway.

Abel died on February 8, 2000, fourteen days before his 82nd birthday.

== Awards and achievements ==
- 2-time NHL first team All-Star (1949, 1950)
- 2-time NHL second-team All-Star (1942, 1951)
- 3-time Stanley Cup champion (1943, 1950, 1952)
- Hart Memorial Trophy (1949)
- Detroit Red Wings #12 retired on April 29, 1995
- Named part of the first group of players on the list of '100 Greatest NHL Players in history in January 2017.

== Career statistics ==
			Regular season					Playoffs
Season	Team	League	GP	G	A	Pts	PIM	GP	G	A	Pts	PIM
1936–37	Melville Millionaires	S-SJHL	—	—	—	—	—	—	—	—	—	—
1936–37	Saskatoon Wesleys	N-SJHL	—	—	—	—	—	3	6	2	8	2
1936–37	Saskatoon Wesleys	M-Cup	—	—	—	—	—	8	8	5	13	6
1937–38	Flin Flon Bombers	N-SSHL	23	12	16	28	13	8	4	4	8	17
1937–38	Flin Flon Bombers	Al-Cup	—	—	—	—	—	7	6	1	7	4
1938–39	Detroit Red Wings	NHL	15	1	1	2	0	6	1	1	2	2
1938–39	Pittsburgh Hornets	IAHL	41	22	24	46	27	—	—	—	—	—
1939–40	Detroit Red Wings	NHL	24	1	5	6	4	5	0	3	3	21
1939–40	Indianapolis Capitals	IAHL	21	7	11	18	10	—	—	—	—	—
1940–41	Detroit Red Wings	NHL	47	11	22	33	29	9	2	2	4	2
1941–42	Detroit Red Wings	NHL	48	18	31	49	45	12	4	2	6	8
1942–43	Detroit Red Wings	NHL	49	18	24	42	33	10	5	8	13	4
1943–44	Montreal RCAF	QSHL	7	5	4	9	12	—	—	—	—	—
1943–44	Montreal Canada Car	MCHL	2	1	0	1	4	—	—	—	—	—
1944–45	Montreal RCAF	MCHL	4	6	8	14	4	—	—	—	—	—
1944–45	Lachine Rapides	QPHL	2	2	2	4	2	—	—	—	—	—
1944–45	Kingston RCAF	Exhib.	2	2	1	3	0	—	—	—	—	—
1945–46	Detroit Red Wings	NHL	7	0	2	2	0	3	0	0	0	0
1946–47	Detroit Red Wings	NHL	60	19	29	48	29	3	1	1	2	2
1947–48	Detroit Red Wings	NHL	60	14	30	44	69	10	0	3	3	16
1948–49	Detroit Red Wings	NHL	60	28	26	54	49	11	3	3	6	6
1949–50	Detroit Red Wings	NHL	69	34	35	69	46	14	6	2	8	6
1950–51	Detroit Red Wings	NHL	69	23	38	61	30	6	4	3	7	0
1951–52	Detroit Red Wings	NHL	62	17	36	53	32	7	2	2	4	12
1952–53	Chicago Black Hawks	NHL	39	5	4	9	6	1	0	0	0	0
1953–54	Chicago Black Hawks	NHL	3	0	0	0	4	—	—	—	—	—
NHL totals			612	189	283	472	376	97	28	30	58	79

== Coaching record ==
Team	Year	Regular season							Post season		
Team	Year	G	W	L	T	Pts	Finish	W	L	Pct.	Result
CHI	1952–53	70	27	28	15	69	4th in NHL	3	4	.429	Lost in Semifinals (MTL)
CHI	1953–54	70	12	51	7	31	6th in NHL	—	—	—	Did not qualify
DET	1957–58	33	16	12	5	37	3rd in NHL	0	4	.000	Lost in Semifinals (MTL)
DET	1958–59	70	25	37	8	58	6th in NHL	—	—	—	Did not qualify
DET	1959–60	70	26	29	15	67	4th in NHL	2	4	.333	Lost in Semifinals (TOR)
DET	1960–61	70	25	29	16	66	4th in NHL	6	5	.545	Lost in Stanley Cup Final (CHI)
DET	1961–62	70	23	33	14	60	5th in NHL	—	—	—	Did not qualify
DET	1962–63	70	32	25	13	77	4th in NHL	7	7	.500	Lost in Stanley Cup Final (TOR)
DET	1963–64	70	30	29	11	71	4th in NHL	5	6	.455	Lost in Stanley Cup Final (TOR)
DET	1964–65	70	40	23	7	87	1st in NHL	3	4	.429	Lost in Semifinals (CHI)
DET	1965–66	70	31	27	12	74	4th in NHL	6	6	.500	Lost in Stanley Cup Final (MTL)
DET	1966–67	70	27	39	4	58	5th in NHL	—	—	—	Did not qualify
DET	1967–68	74	27	35	12	66	5th in East	—	—	—	Did not qualify
DET	1969–70	74	38	21	15	91	3rd in East	0	4	.000	Lost in quarterfinals (CHI)
STL	1971–72	10	3	6	1	(7)	(fired)	—	—	—	—
KC	1975–76	3	0	3	0	0	(interim)	—	—	—	—
Total		964	382	427	155	919		32	44	.421	9 playoff appearances

== See also ==
- List of ice hockey line nicknames
- List of members of the Hockey Hall of Fame
- Notable families in the NHL
- Production Line (ice hockey)
- Captain (ice hockey)

Awards
Preceded by Buddy O'Connor	Winner of the Hart Trophy; 1949	Succeeded by Chuck Rayner
Sporting positions
Preceded by Syd Howe	Detroit Red Wings captain 1942–43	Succeeded by Mud Bruneteau
Preceded by Flash Hollett	Detroit Red Wings captain 1945–52	Succeeded by Ted Lindsay
Preceded by Ebbie Goodfellow	Head coach of the Chicago Black Hawks; 1952–54	Succeeded by Frank Eddolls
Preceded by Jimmy Skinner	Head coach of the Detroit Red Wings; 1958–68	Succeeded by Bill Gadsby
Preceded by Bill Gadsby	Head Coach of the Detroit Red Wings; 1969–70	Succeeded by Ned Harkness
Preceded by Scotty Bowman	Head coach of the St. Louis Blues; 1971–72	Succeeded by Bill McCreary Sr.
Preceded by Bep Guidolin	Head coach of the Kansas City Scouts; 1975–76	Succeeded by Eddie Bush
Preceded by Jack Adams	general manager of the Detroit Red Wings; 1962–71	Succeeded by Ned Harkness
Preceded by Scotty Bowman	general manager of the St. Louis Blues; 1971–72	Succeeded by Chuck Catto
Preceded by Position created	general manager of the Kansas City Scouts; 1974–76	Succeeded by Ray Miron
