= Alex Delvecchio =

Canadian ice hockey player and coach (1931–2025)

- Hockey Hall of Fame, 1977
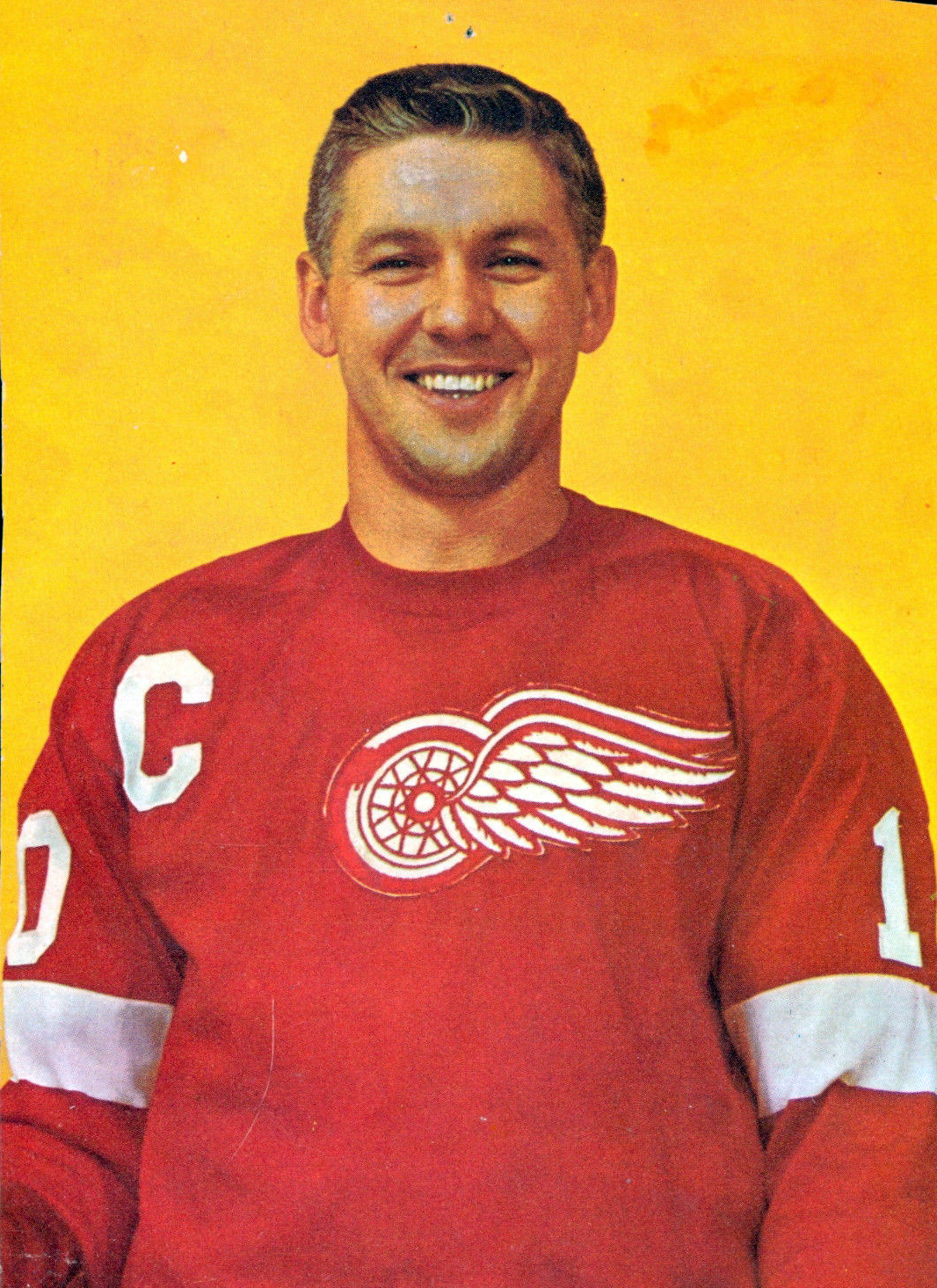
- Delvecchio with the Detroit Red Wings, c. 1963
- Born: December 4, 1931 Fort William, Ontario, Canada
- Died: July 1, 2025 (aged 93) Rochester, Michigan, U.S.
- Height: 5 ft 11 in (180 cm)
- Weight: 180 lb (82 kg; 12 st 12 lb)
- Position: Centre / Left Wing
- Shot: Left
- Played for: Detroit Red Wings
- Playing career: 1951–1973

Alexander Peter "Fats" Delvecchio (/dɛlˈvɛkiːoʊ/ del-VEK-ee-oh; December 4, 1931 – July 1, 2025) was a Canadian professional ice hockey player, coach, and general manager who spent his entire National Hockey League (NHL) career with the Detroit Red Wings. In a playing career that lasted from 1951 to 1973, Delvecchio played in 1,549 games and recorded 1,281 points. At the time of his retirement, he was second in NHL history in number of games played, assists, and points. He won the Lady Byng Memorial Trophy for sportsmanship and gentlemanly conduct three times and helped the Red Wings win the Stanley Cup three times. He is one of three NHL players to spend their entire career with one franchise and play at least 1,500 games with that team (the other two, Steve Yzerman and Nicklas Lidström, also played for the Red Wings). Upon retiring in 1973, Delvecchio was named head coach of the Red Wings and was also named the team's general manager in 1974; he served in both roles until 1977. Delvecchio was inducted into the Hockey Hall of Fame in 1977, and in 2017 was named one of the "100 Greatest NHL Players" in history.

Delvecchio was the last surviving member of the Red Wings' 1952, 1954 and 1955 Stanley Cup teams.

== Playing career ==
In 1950-51, Delvecchio played for the Oshawa Generals of the Ontario Hockey Association (OHA) and led the league in assists that year. He made his NHL debut on March 25, 1951, playing against the Montreal Canadiens in the Red Wings' final game of the season. In 1951–52, he spent six games with the team's minor league affiliate, the Indianapolis Capitals of the American Hockey League (AHL), for whom he scored nine points, before joining the Red Wings full-time. He helped the team win the Stanley Cup that year. He went on to excel both at centre and left wing for 22 full seasons and was notable as a member of the "Production Line" with linemates Gordie Howe and Ted Lindsay.

In 1956–57, Delvecchio was laid up by a broken ankle for 22 games, but seldom missed a game, thereafter, missing only 14 over the following 16 seasons of his career.

In NHL history, Delvecchio is surpassed only by Nicklas Lidström in the number of games played in a career spent with only one team. Despite his impressive career, Delvecchio was never the Red Wings' leading point scorer in a season, primarily due to Howe's presence. The closest he ever came was in the 1969–70 NHL season, where he was just three points behind Howe for the team lead.

== Post-playing career ==
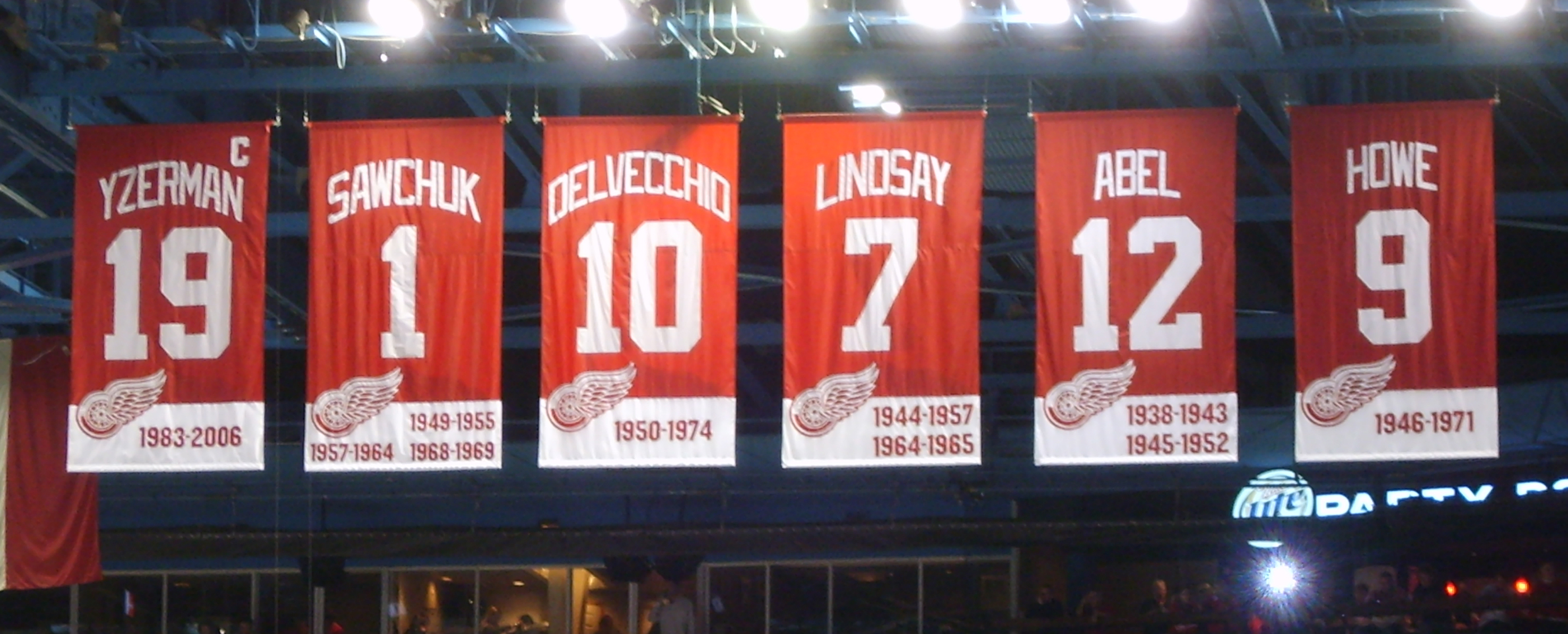
Delvecchio's #10 banner hanging (third from left) in Joe Louis Arena.

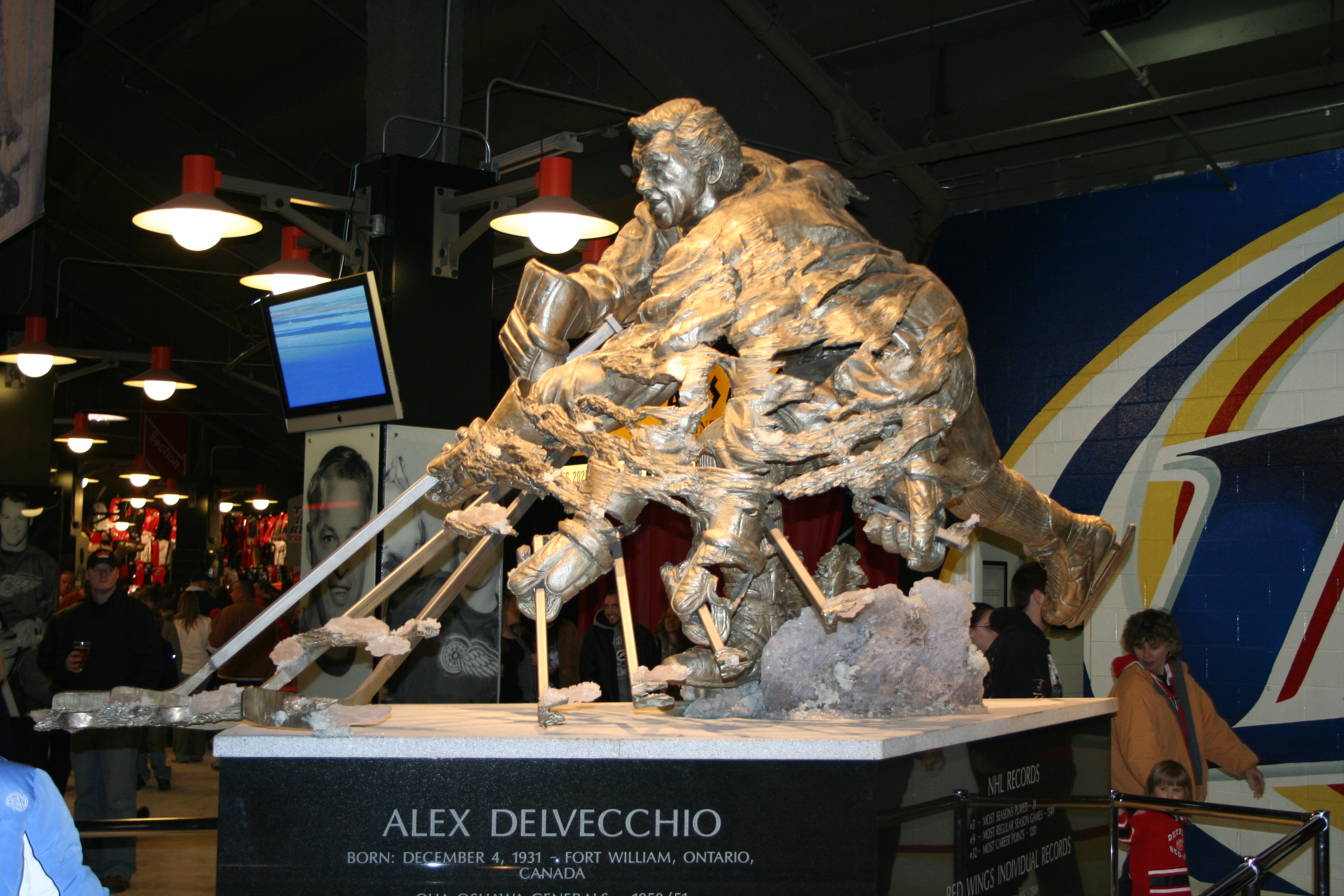
Statue of Delvecchio at Joe Louis Arena.

Following his retirement as a player in 1973, Delvecchio served two stints as Detroit's head coach and one as general manager until leaving hockey in 1977 to go into business. He founded Alex Delvecchio Enterprises, which made and engraved plaques, signs and promotional products. Delvecchio was an "Honored Member" of the Detroit Red Wings Alumni Association and was active in its efforts to raise money for children's charities in Metro Detroit. At the time of his retirement, he ranked second only to Howe in nearly every significant offensive category in Red Wings history. He has since been passed in most of those categories by Steve Yzerman and in assists by Nicklas Lidström, but he remains third behind Howe and Lidström in games played as a Red Wing.

== Private life ==
Delvecchio claimed both Slovak and Italian heritage. His mother, Annie Tapak, was a daughter of Slovak immigrants from Orava Jozef Ťapák and Anna Ťapáková.

Delvecchio died at his home in Rochester, Michigan on July 1, 2025, at the age of 93.

== Career statistics ==
			Regular season					Playoffs
Season	Team	League	GP	G	A	Pts	PIM	GP	G	A	Pts	PIM
1947–48	Fort William Rangers	TBJHL	1	0	0	0	0	—	—	—	—	—
1948–49	Fort William Rangers	TBJHL	12	16	8	24	53	1	2	0	2	0
1948–49	Port Arthur Bruins	M-Cup	—	—	—	—	—	5	2	2	4	1
1949–50	Fort William Rangers	TBJHL	18	16	20	36	36	5	4	4	8	15
1950–51	Oshawa Generals	OHA	54	49	72	121	36	5	4	10	14	5
1950–51	Detroit Red Wings	NHL	1	0	0	0	0	—	—	—	—	—
1951–52	Detroit Red Wings	NHL	65	15	22	37	22	8	0	3	3	4
1951–52	Indianapolis Capitals	AHL	6	3	6	9	4	—	—	—	—	—
1952–53	Detroit Red Wings	NHL	70	16	43	59	28	6	2	4	6	2
1953–54	Detroit Red Wings	NHL	69	11	18	29	34	12	2	7	9	7
1954–55	Detroit Red Wings	NHL	70	17	31	48	37	11	7	8	15	2
1955–56	Detroit Red Wings	NHL	70	25	26	51	24	10	7	3	10	2
1956–57	Detroit Red Wings	NHL	48	16	25	41	8	5	3	2	5	2
1957–58	Detroit Red Wings	NHL	70	21	38	59	22	4	0	1	1	0
1958–59	Detroit Red Wings	NHL	70	19	35	54	6	—	—	—	—	—
1959–60	Detroit Red Wings	NHL	70	19	28	47	8	6	2	6	8	0
1960–61	Detroit Red Wings	NHL	70	27	35	62	26	11	4	5	9	0
1961–62	Detroit Red Wings	NHL	70	26	43	69	18	—	—	—	—	—
1962–63	Detroit Red Wings	NHL	70	20	44	64	8	11	3	6	9	2
1963–64	Detroit Red Wings	NHL	70	23	30	53	11	14	3	8	11	0
1964–65	Detroit Red Wings	NHL	68	25	42	67	16	7	2	3	5	4
1965–66	Detroit Red Wings	NHL	70	31	38	69	16	12	0	11	11	4
1966–67	Detroit Red Wings	NHL	70	17	38	55	10	—	—	—	—	—
1967–68	Detroit Red Wings	NHL	74	22	48	70	14	—	—	—	—	—
1968–69	Detroit Red Wings	NHL	72	25	58	83	8	—	—	—	—	—
1969–70	Detroit Red Wings	NHL	73	21	47	68	24	4	0	2	2	0
1970–71	Detroit Red Wings	NHL	77	21	34	55	6	—	—	—	—	—
1971–72	Detroit Red Wings	NHL	75	20	45	65	22	—	—	—	—	—
1972–73	Detroit Red Wings	NHL	77	18	53	71	13	—	—	—	—	—
1973–74	Detroit Red Wings	NHL	11	1	4	5	2	—	—	—	—	—
NHL totals			1,550	456	825	1,281	383	121	35	69	104	29

Citation:

== Achievements ==
- Third all-time in games played in a Red Wings uniform (behind Nicklas Lidström and Gordie Howe).
- Retired as the overall leader in games played in a career spent with only one team; passed by Lidstrom in 2012; as of 2025 still a record for forwards.
- Stanley Cup champion with Detroit in 1952, 1954 and 1955.
- Named a Second Team All-Star in 1953 (at centre) and 1959 (at left wing).
- Played in the All-Star Game 13 times (in 1953, 1954, 1955, 1956, 1957, 1958, 1959, 1961, 1962, 1963, 1964, 1965 and 1967), a total surpassed by only six players.
- Served as team captain for 12 years, a mark surpassed only by Steve Yzerman.
- As of 2025, remains 16th all-time in NHL history in games played and 39th in points scored.
- Third in points and goals, and fourth in assists, in Red Wings history.
- Ranked number 82 on The Hockey News' list of the 100 Greatest Hockey Players in 1998.
- Jersey number 10 retired on November 10, 1991 by the Red Wings.
- On October 16, 2008, the Red Wings unveiled a commemorative statue for him by artist Omri R. Amrany.
- Named one of the "100 Greatest NHL Players" in history in January 2017.

== NHL coaching record ==
Team	Year	Regular season						Postseason
Team	Year	G	W	L	T	Pts	Finish	Result
Detroit Red Wings	1973–74	67	27	31	9	63	6th in East	Missed playoffs
Detroit Red Wings	1974–75	80	23	45	12	58	4th in Norris	Missed playoffs
Detroit Red Wings	1975–76	54	19	29	6	44	4th in Norris	Missed playoffs
Detroit Red Wings	1976–77	44	13	26	5	31	5th in Norris	Resigned
Total		245	82	131	32			

== See also ==
- List of Detroit Red Wings award winners
- List of ice hockey line nicknames
- List of NHL players with 1,000 points
- List of NHL players with 1,000 games played
- List of NHL players who spent their entire career with one franchise
- Production line (hockey)
- List of Detroit Red Wings general managers
- List of Detroit Red Wings head coaches

Preceded by Gordie Howe	Detroit Red Wings captain 1962–73	Succeeded by Nick Libett rotating captaincy begins
Preceded by Ted Garvin	Head coach of the Detroit Red Wings; 1973–1975	Succeeded by Doug Barkley
Preceded by Doug Barkley	Head coach of the Detroit Red Wings; 1976	Succeeded by Larry Wilson
Preceded by Ned Harkness	General Manager of the Detroit Red Wings; 1974–77	Succeeded by Ted Lindsay
Preceded by Camille Henry	Winner of the Lady Byng Trophy; 1959	Succeeded by Don McKenney
Preceded by Bobby Hull	Winner of the Lady Byng Trophy; 1966	Succeeded by Stan Mikita
Preceded by Stan Mikita	Winner of the Lady Byng Trophy; 1969	Succeeded by Phil Goyette
