= Toe Blake =

Canadian ice hockey player (1912–1995)

Toe Blake CM
- Hockey Hall of Fame, 1966
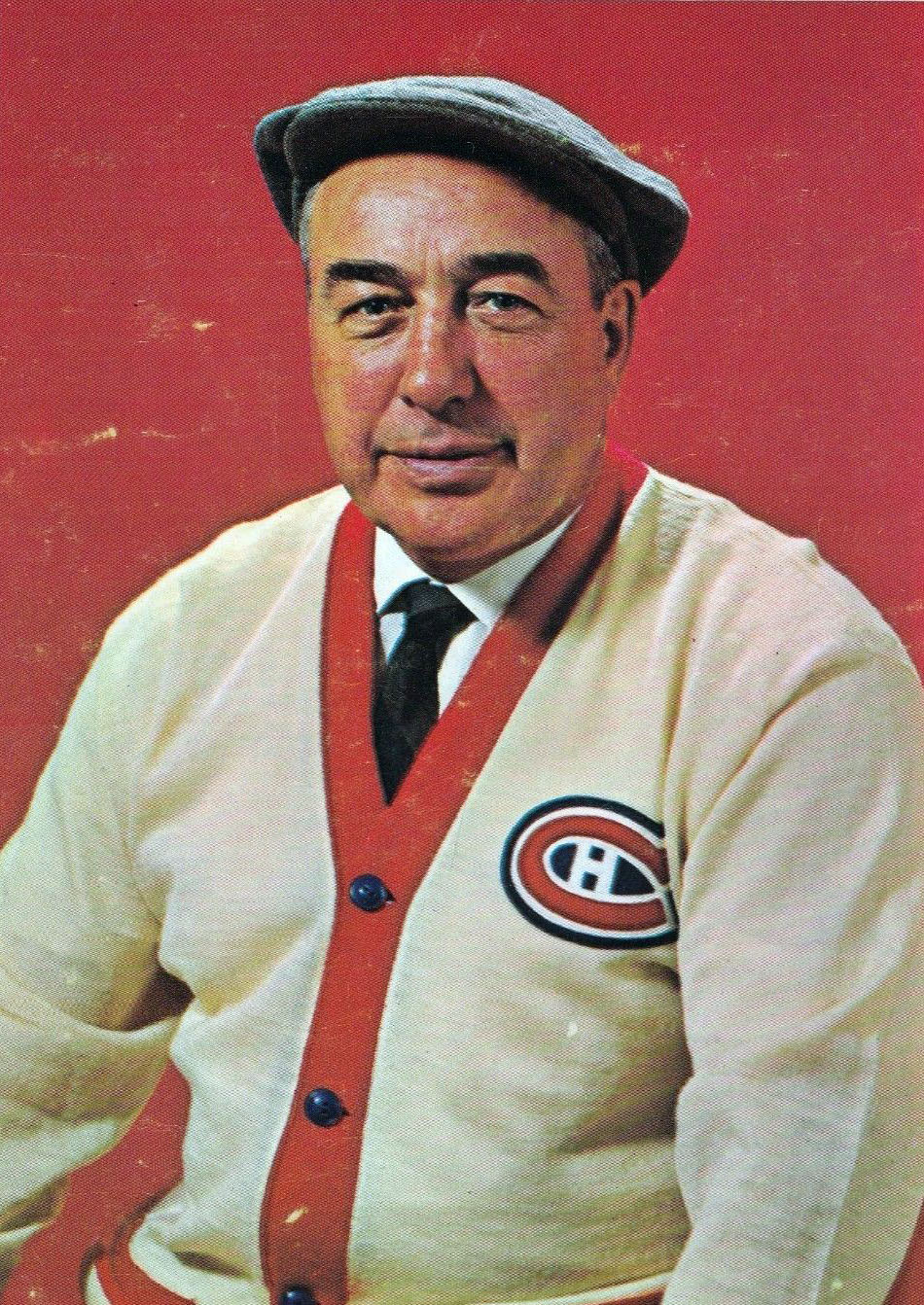
- Blake, c. 1963
- Born: August 21, 1912 Victoria Mines, Ontario, Canada
- Died: May 17, 1995 (aged 82) Montreal, Quebec, Canada
- Height: 5 ft 10 in (178 cm)
- Weight: 162 lb (73 kg; 11 st 8 lb)
- Position: Left wing
- Shot: Left
- Played for: Montreal Maroons; Montreal Canadiens
- Coached for: Montreal Canadiens
- Playing career: 1934–1951
- Coaching career: 1955–1968

Joseph Hector "Toe" Blake CM (August 21, 1912 – May 17, 1995) was a Canadian ice hockey player and coach in the National Hockey League (NHL). Blake played in the NHL from 1935 to 1948 with the Montreal Maroons and Montreal Canadiens. He led the NHL in scoring in 1939, while also winning the Hart Trophy for most valuable player, and served as captain of the Canadiens from 1940 to his retirement. He won the Stanley Cup three times as a player: in 1935 with the Maroons, and in 1944 and 1946 with the Canadiens. While with the Canadiens, Blake played on a line with Elmer Lach and Maurice Richard which was dubbed the Punch line, as all three were highly-skilled players. In 2017, Blake was named one of the '100 Greatest NHL Players' in history. He was also known as "the Old Lamplighter" due to his skill for putting the puck in the net.

Blake retired as a player in 1951, and soon after turned to coaching. After several years in lower leagues he was named the Canadiens' coach in 1955, and would remain in that role until his retirement in 1968. He was the first coach to win 500 games with one team. As coach of the Canadiens he won the Stanley Cup a further eight times, and helped Montreal become one of the most dominant teams in NHL history.

== Early life ==
Blake was one of 13 children to Wilmer and Arzélie Blake (11 survived childhood). Wilmer (born 1874) was originally from Massachusetts and had moved to Canada around 1896, and was of English and Irish ancestry. Arzélie was born in Buckingham, Quebec in 1877; her family, the Filions, had arrived in Quebec in the 17th century. Wilmer and Arzélie married in 1898, and shortly after moved to Sudbury, Ontario for work. Soon after Blake's birth the family moved to Coniston, as the mine Wilmer had been working at was slowly closing.

== Playing career ==
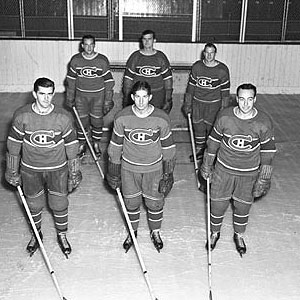
The Punch line: Maurice Richard (bottom left), Elmer Lach (centre), and Toe Blake (bottom right)

Blake played junior and senior hockey in the Sudbury area and was part of the 1932 Memorial Cup champions, the Sudbury Cub Wolves. He played for the Hamilton Tigers of the Ontario Hockey Association during the 1934–35 season before he signed with the Montreal Maroons of the National Hockey League on February 22, 1935; he made his NHL debut two days later on February 24, against the Chicago Black Hawks. Blake played eight games with the Maroons in the 1934–35 season, but was held scoreless; he did not play in any of the team's playoff games, but when the Maroons won the Stanley Cup, Blake's name was added to the trophy. Blake then played for the Canadiens until his retirement in 1948. He won the Hart Memorial Trophy as the NHL's Most Valuable Player in 1938–39; that same year he was also the league scoring champion with 47 points. For the last eight seasons, he was team captain, and led the Canadiens to Stanley Cups in 1944 and 1946. In the latter year, in which he incurred only one minor penalty, he became the first Canadien ever to win the Lady Byng Memorial Trophy for sportsmanship, which only Mats Näslund (in 1987–88) and Cole Caufield (in 2025–26) have replicated.

While playing with the Canadiens, he was part of a trio called the "Punch Line," with Elmer Lach at centre and Maurice Richard at right wing. He scored the Stanley Cup-clinching goal in the 1944 Stanley Cup Final at 9:12 of the first overtime of game four, helping the Canadiens complete a four-game sweep of the Chicago Blackhawks. The following season, the Punch Line became the second set of linemates ever to finish first, second, and third in NHL scoring in one season (Lach had 80 points, Richard 73, and Blake 67). They followed the Boston Bruins' Kraut Line of 1939–40, and would be followed by the Detroit Red Wings' Production Line in 1949–50.

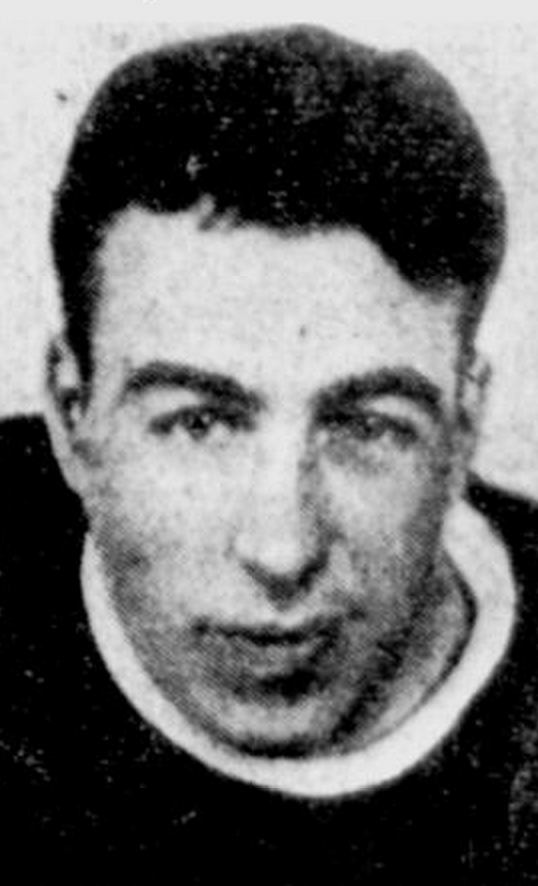
Toe Blake

During a loss to the New York Rangers on January 11, 1948, Blake collided with Rangers' skater Bill Juzda, awkwardly hit the boards and suffered a double fracture of his ankle, ending his NHL career. In 1998, he was ranked number 66 on The Hockey News’ list of the NHL's 100 greatest players of all time to date. At the time of his retirement from the NHL Blake was second all-time in career scoring with 527 points, 21 points behind Bill Cowley for the all-time record. He had the all-time record for career points in the playoffs with 62 points in 58 games.

== Coaching career ==
After eight years coaching several of the Canadiens' minor-league affiliates, he was named head coach of the Canadiens on June 8, 1955, replacing Dick Irvin. Blake was fluently bilingual in English and French, and Canadiens management also felt that Richard's former linemate was better suited to control the star's explosive temper (which had led to a riot the previous spring).

Blake coached the Canadiens for thirteen years, winning the Stanley Cup eight times — the most titles for any coach in the team's history, the most with one team, and second-most league-wide behind Scotty Bowman, who won nine Stanley Cups in total (five Cups with the Canadiens, one with the Pittsburgh Penguins, and three with the Detroit Red Wings.) His 500 regular-season wins are still the most in Canadiens history. Notably, he won championships in each of his first five seasons as a head coach, this streak being an NHL record that stands to this day. The only other person to have performed a similar feat in his first five seasons as a coach or manager of any particular team in North American professional sports is Casey Stengel of the New York Yankees, although unlike Blake's case the Yankees were not the first team Stengel managed. Blake turned down Jacques Plante's request to wear a mask during games for fear that it would impair his vision. However, after a shot from Rangers player Andy Bathgate broke Plante's nose in a game on November 1, 1959, Blake finally relented. The 1960 Stanley Cup playoffs saw Montreal win all eight games to become the fourth team to win the Cup without losing a playoff game, a feat that has not been matched since.

Blake retired after the Habs clinched the Cup in game four of the 1968 Finals, ending 33 consecutive years at ice level with the Canadiens organization.

== Personal life ==
Born in what is now the ghost town of Victoria Mines, Blake was raised playing outdoor hockey in the town of Coniston near the city of Sudbury in Northern Ontario.

His nickname came from a childhood experience: his younger sister had difficulty pronouncing his name, rendering it as something like "Hec-toe". Thus, the nickname "Toe" arose, and ultimately replaced the nickname he had been given as a scorer, the Old Lamplighter, because he often activated the light behind the goal.

After retiring from the Canadiens, Blake and his family resided permanently in Montreal. In 1952, he opened Toe Blake's Tavern, at the corner of Guy Street and Saint Catherine Street in Montreal, just a few blocks from the Montreal Forum. The tavern closed in 1983.

Blake suffered from Alzheimer's disease in his final years. When respected writer Red Fisher visited him in the nursing home in 1989, Blake could not recognize his old friend. Blake died on May 17, 1995, at the age of 82.

He was the uncle of Mike Blake.

=== Legacy ===
Blake was elected to the Hockey Hall of Fame in 1966 in the player category, and was made a Member of the Order of Canada in 1982. A park located next to his Montreal West home is named in his honour.

In 2011, the community centre in Blake's hometown of Coniston, Ontario, was renamed the "Toe Blake Memorial Arena" in his honour.

== Career statistics ==
=== Regular season and playoffs ===
| | | | Regular season | | | | | Playoffs |
| Season | Team | League | GP | G | A | Pts | PIM | GP | G | A | Pts | PIM |
|---|---|---|---|---|---|---|---|---|---|---|---|---|
| 1929–30 | Cochrane Dunlops | NOJHA | 7 | 3 | 0 | 3 | 4 | — | — | — | — | — |
| 1930–31 | Sudbury Cub Wolves | NOJHA | 6 | 3 | 1 | 4 | 12 | 2 | 0 | 0 | 0 | 6 |
| 1930–31 | Sudbury Industries | NOHA | 8 | 7 | 1 | 8 | 10 | 3 | 1 | 1 | 2 | 4 |
| 1930–31 | Sudbury Cub Wolves | M-Cup | — | — | — | — | — | 5 | 4 | 1 | 5 | 6 |
| 1930–31 | Sudbury Wolves | Al-Cup | — | — | — | — | — | 3 | 3 | 1 | 4 | 0 |
| 1931–32 | Sudbury Cub Wolves | NOJHA | 3 | 5 | 0 | 5 | 4 | — | — | — | — | — |
| 1931–32 | Falconbridge Falcons | NOHA | 10 | 8 | 1 | 9 | 18 | 2 | 1 | 0 | 1 | 2 |
| 1932–33 | Hamilton Tigers | OHA Sr | 22 | 9 | 4 | 13 | 26 | 2 | 0 | 0 | 0 | 2 |
| 1933–34 | Hamilton Tigers | OHA Sr | 23 | 19 | 14 | 33 | 28 | 3 | 4 | 3 | 7 | 4 |
| 1933–34 | Hamilton Tigers | Al-Cup | — | — | — | — | — | 8 | 5 | 2 | 7 | 4 |
| 1934–35 | Hamilton Tigers | OHA Sr | 18 | 15 | 11 | 26 | 48 | — | — | — | — | — |
| 1934–35 | Montreal Maroons | NHL | 8 | 0 | 0 | 0 | 0 | 1 | 0 | 0 | 0 | 0 |
| 1935–36 | Providence Reds | Can-Am | 33 | 12 | 11 | 23 | 65 | 7 | 2 | 3 | 5 | 2 |
| 1935–36 | Montreal Canadiens | NHL | 11 | 1 | 2 | 3 | 28 | — | — | — | — | — |
| 1936–37 | Montreal Canadiens | NHL | 43 | 10 | 12 | 22 | 12 | 5 | 1 | 0 | 1 | 0 |
| 1937–38 | Montreal Canadiens | NHL | 43 | 17 | 16 | 33 | 33 | 3 | 3 | 1 | 4 | 2 |
| 1938–39 | Montreal Canadiens | NHL | 48 | 24 | 23 | 47 | 10 | 3 | 1 | 1 | 2 | 2 |
| 1939–40 | Montreal Canadiens | NHL | 48 | 17 | 19 | 36 | 48 | — | — | — | — | — |
| 1940–41 | Montreal Canadiens | NHL | 48 | 12 | 20 | 32 | 49 | 3 | 0 | 3 | 3 | 5 |
| 1941–42 | Montreal Canadiens | NHL | 48 | 17 | 28 | 45 | 19 | 3 | 0 | 3 | 3 | 2 |
| 1942–43 | Montreal Canadiens | NHL | 48 | 23 | 36 | 59 | 26 | 5 | 4 | 3 | 7 | 0 |
| 1943–44 | Montreal Canadiens | NHL | 41 | 26 | 33 | 59 | 10 | 9 | 7 | 11 | 18 | 2 |
| 1944–45 | Montreal Canadiens | NHL | 49 | 29 | 38 | 67 | 25 | 6 | 0 | 2 | 2 | 5 |
| 1945–46 | Montreal Canadiens | NHL | 50 | 29 | 21 | 50 | 2 | 9 | 7 | 6 | 13 | 5 |
| 1946–47 | Montreal Canadiens | NHL | 60 | 21 | 29 | 50 | 6 | 11 | 2 | 7 | 9 | 0 |
| 1947–48 | Montreal Canadiens | NHL | 32 | 9 | 15 | 24 | 4 | — | — | — | — | — |
| 1948–49 | Buffalo Bisons | AHL | 18 | 1 | 3 | 4 | 0 | — | — | — | — | — |
| 1949–50 | Valleyfield Braves | QSHL | 43 | 12 | 15 | 27 | 15 | 3 | 0 | 1 | 1 | 0 |
| 1950–51 | Valleyfield Braves | QSHL | — | — | — | — | — | 1 | 0 | 0 | 0 | 0 |
| NHL totals | | | 577 | 235 | 292 | 527 | 282 | 57 | 25 | 37 | 62 | 23 |

- Source: Total Hockey

=== Coaching record ===
| Team | Year | Regular season | | | | | | Postseason | | | |
| Team | Year | G | W | L | T | Pts | Finish | W | L | Win % | Result |
|---|---|---|---|---|---|---|---|---|---|---|---|
| MTL | 1955–56 | 70 | 45 | 15 | 10 | 100 | 1st in NHL | 8 | 2 | .800 | Won Stanley Cup (DET) |
| MTL | 1956–57 | 70 | 35 | 23 | 12 | 82 | 2nd in NHL | 8 | 2 | .800 | Won Stanley Cup (BOS) |
| MTL | 1957–58 | 70 | 43 | 17 | 10 | 96 | 1st in NHL | 8 | 2 | .800 | Won Stanley Cup (BOS) |
| MTL | 1958–59 | 70 | 39 | 18 | 13 | 91 | 1st in NHL | 8 | 3 | .727 | Won Stanley Cup (TOR) |
| MTL | 1959–60 | 70 | 40 | 18 | 12 | 92 | 1st in NHL | 8 | 0 | 1.000 | Won Stanley Cup (TOR) |
| MTL | 1960–61 | 70 | 41 | 19 | 10 | 92 | 1st in NHL | 2 | 4 | .333 | Lost in semifinals (CHI) |
| MTL | 1961–62 | 70 | 42 | 14 | 14 | 98 | 1st in NHL | 2 | 4 | .333 | Lost in semifinals (CHI) |
| MTL | 1962–63 | 70 | 28 | 19 | 23 | 79 | 3rd in NHL | 3 | 4 | .429 | Lost in semifinals (TOR) |
| MTL | 1963–64 | 70 | 36 | 21 | 13 | 85 | 1st in NHL | 1 | 4 | .200 | Lost in semifinals (TOR) |
| MTL | 1964–65 | 70 | 36 | 23 | 11 | 83 | 2nd in NHL | 8 | 5 | .615 | Won Stanley Cup (CHI) |
| MTL | 1965–66 | 70 | 41 | 21 | 8 | 90 | 1st in NHL | 8 | 2 | .800 | Won Stanley Cup (DET) |
| MTL | 1966–67 | 70 | 32 | 25 | 13 | 77 | 2nd in NHL | 6 | 4 | .600 | Lost in Stanley Cup Final (TOR) |
| MTL | 1967–68 | 74 | 42 | 22 | 10 | 94 | 1st in East | 12 | 1 | .923 | Won Stanley Cup (STL) |
| Total | | 914 | 500 | 255 | 159 | 1,159 | | 82 | 37 | .689 | 13 playoff appearances 8 Stanley Cup Wins |

== Awards ==
- Stanley Cup champion — 1935 (with Montreal Maroons as a player)
- Stanley Cup champion — 1944, 1946 (with Montreal Canadiens as a player)
- Stanley Cup champion — 1956, 1957, 1958, 1959, 1960, 1965, 1966, 1968 (head coach of Montreal Canadiens)
- Hart Trophy — 1939
- Scoring Leader — 1939
- Lady Byng Trophy — 1946
- NHL first team All-Star — 1939, 1940, 1945
- NHL second team All-Star — 1938, 1946
- In January, 2017, Blake was part of the first group of players to be named one of the '100 Greatest NHL Players' in history.

== See also ==
- List of members of the Hockey Hall of Fame
- List of National Hockey League head coaching wins and point percentage leaders

== Bibliography ==
- Christie, James (May 18, 1995), "Canadiens taskmaster won on skates and in a fedora", The Globe and Mail, Toronto
- Coleman, Charles L. (1969), The Trail of the Stanley Cup, Vol 2: 1927 – 1946 Inc., Sherbrooke, Quebec: Progressive Publications Incorporated
- Diamond, Dan, ed. (2002), Total Hockey: The Official Encyclopedia of the National Hockey League, Second Edition, New York: Total Sports Publishing, ISBN 1-892129-85-X
- Dryden, Steve, ed. (1997), The Top 100 NHL Players of All Time, Toronto: McClelland & Stewart, ISBN 0-7710-4176-4
- Hackel, Stu (January 1, 2017), Toe Blake: 100 Greatest NHL Players, National Hockey League
- Logothetis, Paul (2020), Toe Blake: Winning Is Everything, Toronto, Ontario: ECW Press, ISBN 978-1-77041-490-7

| Preceded by Gordie Drillon | NHL Scoring Champion; 1939 | Succeeded by Milt Schmidt |
| Preceded by Eddie Shore | Winner of the Hart Trophy; 1939 | Succeeded by Ebbie Goodfellow |
| Preceded by Walter Buswell | Montreal Canadiens captain 1940–48 | Succeeded by Bill Durnan |
| Preceded by Bill Mosienko | Winner of the Lady Byng Trophy; 1946 | Succeeded by Bobby Bauer |
| Preceded by Dick Irvin | Head coach of the Montreal Canadiens; 1955–68 | Succeeded by Claude Ruel |
