= Ted Lindsay =

Canadian ice hockey player (1925–2019)

- Hockey Hall of Fame, 1966
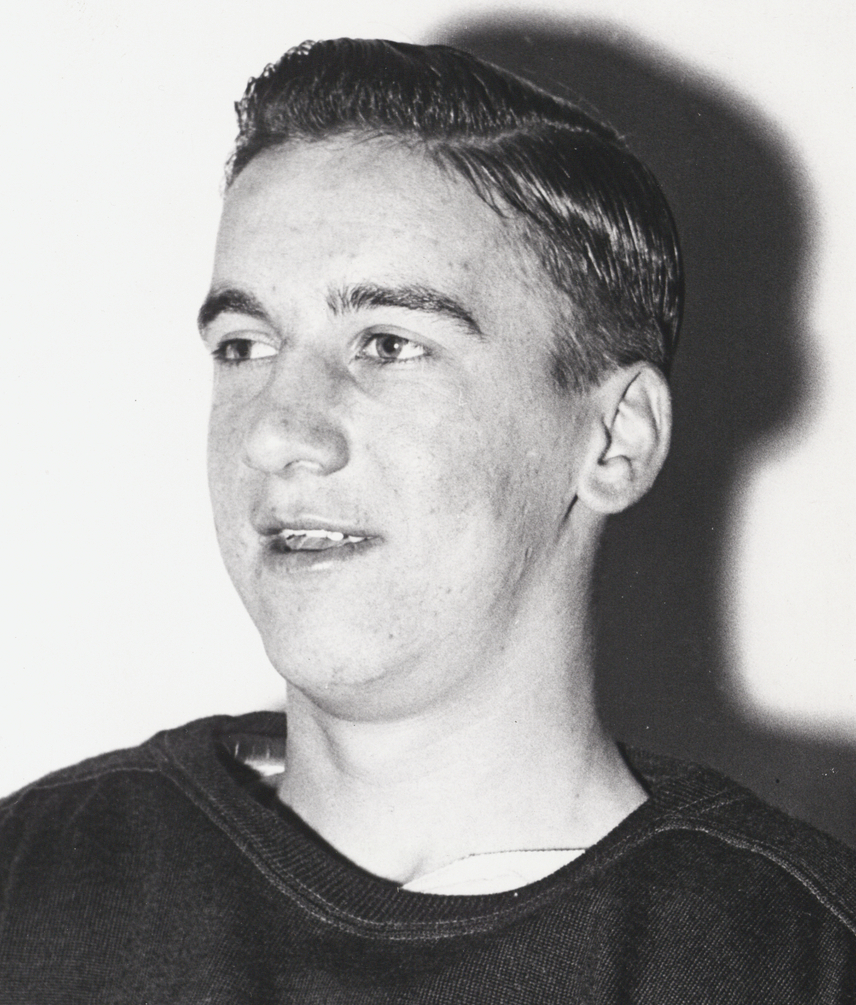
- Lindsay in 1948
- Born: July 29, 1925 Renfrew, Ontario, Canada
- Died: March 4, 2019 (aged 93) Oakland, Michigan, U.S.
- Height: 5 ft 8 in (173 cm)
- Weight: 163 lb (74 kg; 11 st 9 lb)
- Position: Left wing
- Shot: Left
- Played for: Detroit Red Wings; Chicago Black Hawks
- Playing career: 1944–1960; 1964–1965

Robert Blake Theodore Lindsay (July 29, 1925 – March 4, 2019) was a Canadian professional ice hockey player who played as a forward for the Detroit Red Wings and Chicago Black Hawks of the National Hockey League (NHL). Lindsay scored over 800 points in his Hockey Hall of Fame career, won the Art Ross Trophy in 1950, and won the Stanley Cup four times. Often referred to as "Terrible Ted", Lindsay helped to organize the first attempt at a Players' Association in the late 1950s, an action which led to his trade to Chicago. In 2017, Lindsay was named one of the 100 Greatest NHL Players in history. Lindsay played a pivotal role in improving the lives of NHL players. After his retirement, he worked a variety of jobs, serving as a sports broadcaster on NBC before becoming general manager of the Red Wings. He also served as head coach for the Hillsdale College Chargers from 1976 to 1977 and also coached the Red Wings for a time.

== Playing career ==
Lindsay was born in Renfrew, Ontario. His father, Bert Lindsay, had been a professional player himself, playing goaltender for the Renfrew Millionaires, Victoria Aristocrats, and Toronto Arenas. Lindsay played amateur hockey in Kirkland Lake before joining the St. Michael's Majors in Toronto. In 1944 he played for the Memorial Cup champion Oshawa Generals.

Lindsay's performance in the Ontario Hockey Association Junior A League (now the Ontario Hockey League) earned him an invitation to try out with the Detroit Red Wings of the NHL and he made his big league debut in 1944 at the age of 19. Lindsay played only one game in the AHL, with the Indianapolis Capitals, during the 1944–45 AHL season.

Having played amateur in Toronto, yet playing for Detroit, earned him the enmity of Toronto's owner Conn Smythe with whom he would feud for the length of his career.

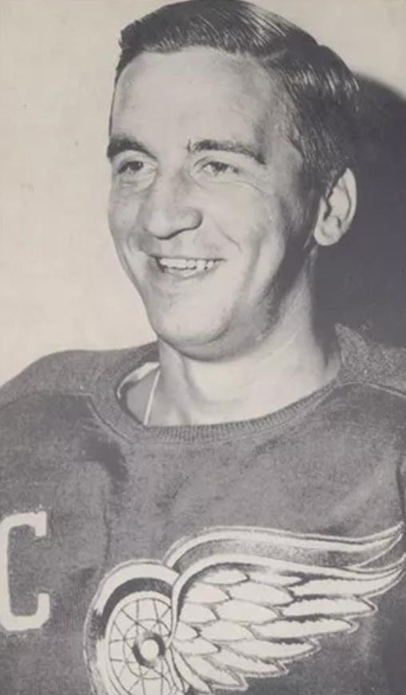
Lindsay with the Detroit Red Wings, c. 1950s

Playing left wing with centre Sid Abel and right winger Gordie Howe, on what the media and fans dubbed the "Production Line", Lindsay became one of the NHL's premier players. Although small in stature compared to most players in the league, he was a fierce competitor who earned the nickname "Terrible Ted" for his toughness. His rough play caused the NHL to develop penalties for 'elbowing' and 'kneeing' to discourage hitting between players using elbows and knees.

In the 1949–50 season, he won the Art Ross Trophy as the league's leading scorer with 78 points and his team won the Stanley Cup. Over the next five years, he helped Detroit win three more championships and appeared with Howe on the cover of a March 1957 Sports Illustrated issue. Lindsay was the first player to lift the Stanley Cup and skate it around the rink, starting the tradition.

=== Players' union ===
That same year, Lindsay attended the annual pension plan meeting as the representative of the Red Wings players, where he found that the plan was kept secret. Later that year when he attended a promotion with football and baseball players, he found out that conditions in the other sports' pro leagues were much better. He was introduced to the lawyers for the players of the other leagues and became convinced that only through an association could the players' conditions be improved.

At a time when teams owned their players for their entire careers, the players began demanding such basics as a minimum salary and a properly funded pension plan. While team owners were getting rich with sold-out arena game after game, players were earning a pittance and many needed summer jobs to make a living. Almost all of these men had no more than a high school education and had been playing hockey as a profession all their working lives. Superstars in the 1950s earned less than $25,000 a year and when their playing days were over, they had nothing to fall back on and had to accept whatever work they could get to survive.

Lindsay and star defenceman Doug Harvey of the Montreal Canadiens led a small group to organize the first National Hockey League Players' Association. In secret, all of the players at the time were contacted and asked for their support to form an "association", not a "union", which was considered going too far. Support was nearly unanimous.

Lindsay worked doggedly for the cause and many fellow players who supported the association were benched or sent to obscurity in the minor leagues. He and Harvey then became convinced that only a union could win the demands, and set up a schedule to get players' support on record to be certified as a union. In a defiant gesture, the Toronto Maple Leafs and Detroit Red Wings were targeted for certification votes. While Montreal's ownership was not opposing a union, Toronto's Conn Smythe was adamantly against it. In the United States, the four teams were controlled or under obligations to the Norris syndicate. Despite Smythe's efforts, the Toronto Maple Leafs players unanimously voted to organize. Next was the turn of Detroit to organize, and the Norrises would fight back.

When asked about the formation of the NHLPA, Lindsay said "Actually, we don't have many grievances. We just felt we should have an organization of this kind." Lindsay, one of the league's top players, was first stripped of his captaincy, then was traded to the struggling Chicago Black Hawks. Jack Adams then planted rumors about Lindsay and false defamatory comments by him against his old team in the press, and showed a fake contract to the press, showing an inflated annual salary. The ruse worked and the Red Wings players rejected the union. Harvey suffered a similar fate, being traded from Montreal to the New York Rangers.

Lindsay initiated an anti-trust lawsuit against the league, alleging a monopoly since 1926. The players had a strong case, that could be easily proved with an exposure of the Norris syndicate's operations, and Frank Calder's efforts against the American Hockey Association (AHA) in 1926 and 1932, ironically involving James E. Norris on the AHA side. Also, the various Norris arenas were hiding revenues through ticket scalping and under-reporting arena capacities and actual ticket sales. Rather than face the lawsuit in court, the NHL, in an out-of-court settlement in February 1958, agreed to most of the players' demands, although the pension plan was not exposed until 1989, showing a surplus of $25 million. Although a union was not formed in 1958, a permanent union would be formed in 1967.

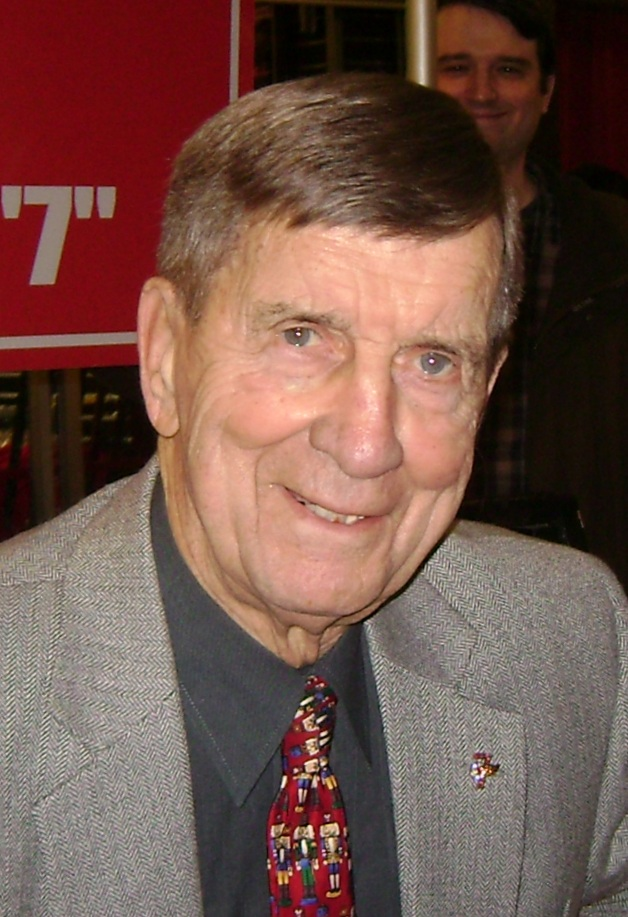
Lindsay in 2011

Part of the problem of organizing the players was confusion about the type of association they were forming. The NHLPA had applied, in Canada, to the Ontario Labour Relations Board for certification, but the OLRB had no experience with workers like hockey players. NHLPA members negotiated individual contracts and wanted to continue to bargain this way. The matter of the NHLPA being an actual union, where the members were bound together and fought for collective agreements, was unclear. The NHLPA legal counsel, Milton Mound, addressed this, saying that the players would negotiate on matters common to all players (pensions, allowances) but retained the right to individual contracts. The League, and especially Conn Smythe, argued that players were forming a "trade union" and were no better than "commies" and would lose things like individual bonuses. He believed that hockey players were in the business of being "independent contractors" and had no right or reason for a collective organization.

The confusion worried both the employer and the employee. The situation was exacerbated by the certification process. The OLRB was taking time, and no one knew how this transnational association would work, or how it would be recognized by the US National Labor Relations Board. In fact, the NLRB asked the NHLPA to withdraw its unfair labor practices charge on November 20, 1957, arguing it did not have jurisdiction. This was followed by the Montreal Canadiens players' rejection of the association in early January 1958.

The OLRB resumed meeting on January 7, but both the League and the players were concerned. The NHL was convinced that the ORLB was not going to dismiss the application, regardless of how they ruled on the union versus association issue, and the players were worried (given the setbacks in Detroit and Montreal) that they didn't have grounds to form an association (especially since they didn't want to be a traditional "union").

The players and owners both felt pressure to conclude something, so they gathered, without lawyers, for a 13-hour meeting in the boardroom of the Biltmore Hotel in Palm Beach, just after the regular NHL winter meetings. In an out-of-court settlement on February 5, 1958, the NHL promised:

- a $7000 minimum wage (which was, in actuality, the unofficial League norm),
- an increase in pension benefits,
- increased hospitalization benefits,
- a limit on the number of exhibition games,
- the player shall be the sole judge of his physical fitness to play after injury.

"The fundamental question at the root of the NHLPA failure was whether players really were laborers who could form a trade union. Seemingly caught in a space both commercial and non-commercial, players felt uneasy locating themselves wholly within either. This in itself reflected the success of the owners in using cultural formations to restrain their labor force. Led by Conn Smythe, the league appealed to cultural bonds of loyalty and tradition as justifications for retaining the existing economic structure of labor-management relations, long after other industries had been forced by the state to move toward formal, union-led collective bargaining arrangements."

For his role in establishing the original Players' Association, the Lester B. Pearson Award was later renamed to the Ted Lindsay Award in his honor. In 1995, the Canadian Broadcasting Corporation produced the hockey movie Net Worth that depicts Lindsay's battle to create the NHL Players' Association, based on the Lindsay chapters in the book of the same name.

The actions of the Red Wings, while maintaining control over the players, hindered their on-ice record. Jack Adams was fired in 1961. Lindsay played in Chicago for three years before retiring in 1960, having played 999 total games. Four years later, the 39-year-old Lindsay was enticed into making a comeback by his former linemate, Abel, who was now coach and general manager of the Red Wings. By playing on October 15, Lindsay played in his 1,000th career regular season game. That year, he helped Detroit to its first regular season championship since his trade seven years earlier; he was one of just six players with 1,000 games played in NHL history.

=== Retirement and legacy ===
The Red Wings did not have enough room on their roster to protect Lindsay in the 1965 interleague draft. He wished to retire as a Red Wing, and he and Abel planned to have him hide on the retired list for the 1965–66 season in anticipation of having him return for a "Last Hurrah" season the next year. However, when Maple Leafs owner C. Stafford Smythe got wind of this gambit, he pressured the league into vetoing it, forcing Lindsay to stay retired.

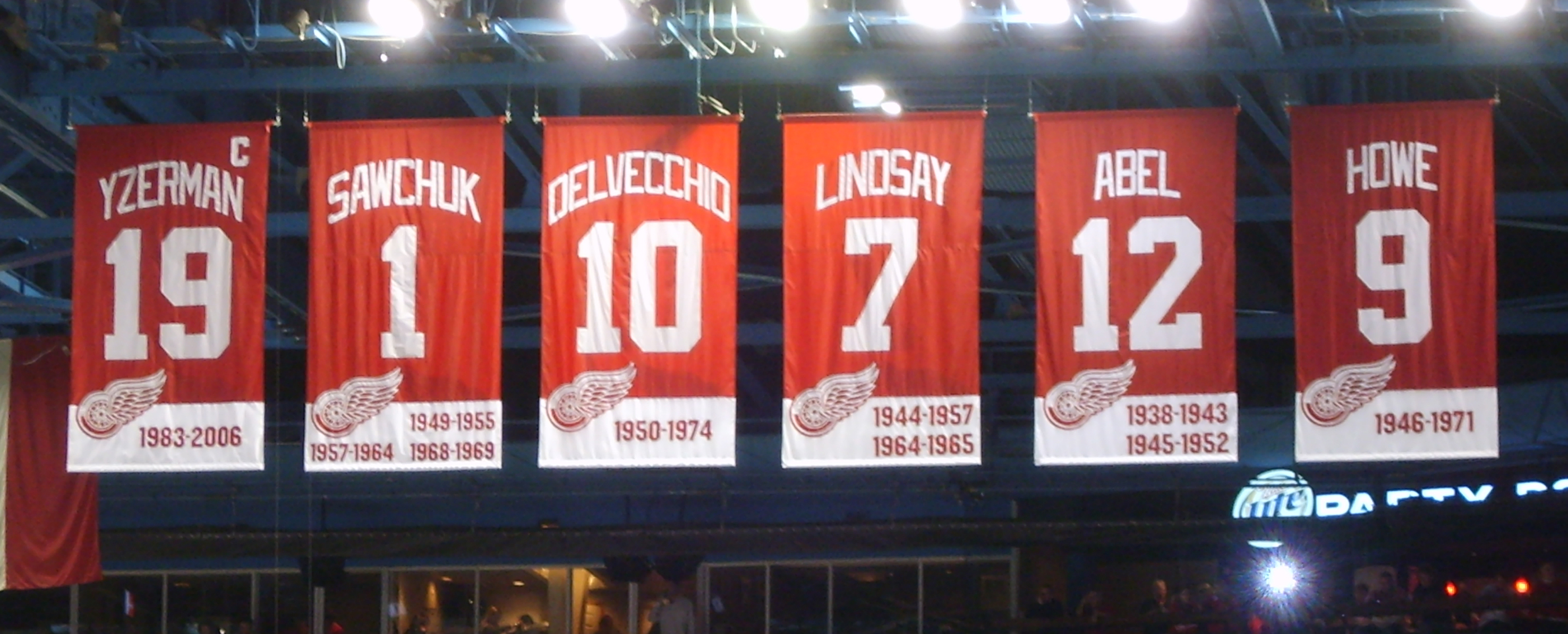
Lindsay's #7 banner hanging in Joe Louis Arena

In his 1,068 career regular season games, Lindsay scored 379 goals and had 472 assists for 851 points. He played 133 playoff games in addition and recorded 47 goals and 96 points. He was voted to the first All-Star team eight times and the second team on one occasion. In 1966 he was inducted into the Hockey Hall of Fame, but refused to attend the men-only ceremony since he was not allowed to bring his wife and children. The rules were changed the following year, allowing women to attend. On November 10, 1991, the Detroit Red Wings honored his contribution to the team by retiring his sweater No. 7. In 1998, he was ranked number 21 on The Hockey News' list of the 100 Greatest Hockey Players.

In 1972, NBC paid the NHL for the rights to broadcast games on national TV in the U.S. Lindsay was hired to do the color analysis, along with Tim Ryan, who did the play-by-play. Lindsay's rough features, the legacy of the many cuts and stitches he accumulated during his playing days, were visible whenever he appeared on camera.

In 1977, Lindsay was named general manager of the Red Wings, who were struggling just to make the playoffs. Soon after taking over as general manager, he appeared in television commercials promoting the slogan "Aggressive hockey is back in town". For his efforts, he was voted the NHL's executive of the year. A year later, the Red Wings made the playoffs for the first time in nine years and won a playoff series for the first time in 12 years. Late in the 1979–80 season, he named himself head coach. He started the 1980–81 season on the bench but was forced out after a 3-14-3 start.

Lindsay was an "Honored Member" of the Detroit Red Wings Alumni Association, and was active in its efforts to raise money for children's charities in Metro Detroit. He attended the Special Olympics Sports Celebrities Festival in Toronto in December 2008.

On October 18, 2008, the Red Wings commemorated Lindsay's career with an original statue commissioned by artist Omri Amrany, who also created the Gordie Howe statue, on the Joe Louis Arena concourse.

The Ted Lindsay Foundation was founded in 2001 to fund research into a cure for autism. As of 2019, the foundation has raised over $3.4 million to fund autism research and provide a network of support to families of those with autism. His foundation donated over $100,000 to the Thoughtful House Center for Children in 2007.

On April 29, 2010, the NHL Players' Association announced that the Lester B. Pearson Award would be reintroduced as the Ted Lindsay Award for his skill, tenacity, leadership, and role in establishing the original Players' Association. The award is given annually to the NHL's most outstanding player in the regular season as judged by the members of the Players' Association.

Lindsay was a third cousin to Bob Errey, who won back-to-back Stanley Cups with the Pittsburgh Penguins in the early 1990s as well as being a distant relative of brothers Bert and Con Corbeau, both of whom were on Stanley Cup-winning teams.

Lindsay was selected to Canada's Sports Hall of Fame in 2002, and was inducted into the Ontario Sports Hall of Fame in 2009. In April 2018, Oakland University awarded Lindsay an honorary doctor of humanities degree.

Lindsay died on March 4, 2019, at his home in Oakland, Michigan.

Lindsay was remembered during the Red Wings' game on March 7, 2019, where they played the New York Rangers. Every seat had a commemorative number 7 on it, and the Red Wings won 3–2 in a close game that ended in a shootout. A public visitation was held on March 8 at Little Caesars Arena in honor of Lindsay.

== Career statistics ==
			Regular season					Playoffs
Season	Team	League	GP	G	A	Pts	PIM	GP	G	A	Pts	PIM
1942–43	Kirkland Lake Lakers	GBHL	—	—	—	—	—	—	—	—	—	—
1943–44	Toronto St. Michael's Majors	OHA-Jr.	22	22	7	29	24	12	13	6	19	16
1943–44	Oshawa Generals	M-Cup	—	—	—	—	—	7	7	2	9	6
1944–45	Detroit Red Wings	NHL	45	17	6	23	43	14	2	0	2	6
1945–46	Detroit Red Wings	NHL	47	7	10	17	14	5	0	1	1	0
1946–47	Detroit Red Wings	NHL	59	27	15	42	57	5	2	2	4	10
1947–48	Detroit Red Wings	NHL	60	33	19	52	95	10	3	1	4	6
1948–49	Detroit Red Wings	NHL	50	26	28	54	97	11	2	6	8	31
1949–50	Detroit Red Wings	NHL	69	23	55	78	141	13	4	4	8	16
1950–51	Detroit Red Wings	NHL	67	24	35	59	110	6	0	1	1	8
1951–52	Detroit Red Wings	NHL	70	30	39	69	123	8	5	2	7	8
1952–53	Detroit Red Wings	NHL	70	32	39	71	111	6	4	4	8	6
1953–54	Detroit Red Wings	NHL	70	26	36	62	110	12	4	4	8	14
1954–55	Detroit Red Wings	NHL	49	19	19	38	85	11	7	12	19	12
1955–56	Detroit Red Wings	NHL	67	27	23	50	161	10	6	3	9	22
1956–57	Detroit Red Wings	NHL	70	30	55	85	103	5	2	4	6	8
1957–58	Chicago Black Hawks	NHL	68	15	24	39	110	—	—	—	—	—
1958–59	Chicago Black Hawks	NHL	70	22	36	58	184	6	2	4	6	13
1959–60	Chicago Black Hawks	NHL	68	7	19	26	91	4	1	1	2	0
1964–65	Detroit Red Wings	NHL	69	14	14	28	173	7	3	0	3	34
NHL totals			1,068	379	472	851	1,808	133	47	49	96	194

== Awards and honours ==
- NHL First All-Star Team (1948, 1950–1954, 1956, 1957)
- NHL Second All-Star Team (1949)
- NHL All-Star Game (1947–1957)
- Art Ross Trophy winner (1950)
- Memorial Cup winner (1944)
- Four-time Stanley Cup champion (1950, 1952, 1954, 1955)
- Inducted into the Hockey Hall of Fame in 1966
- Inducted into the Canada's Sports Hall of Fame in 2002
- Detroit Red Wings #7 retired on November 10, 1991
- The Hockey News Executive of the Year (1977)
- In January 2017, Lindsay was part of the first group of players to be named one of the '100 Greatest NHL Players' in history.

Source: Who's Who in Canadian Sport.

== NHL coaching record ==
Team	Year	Regular season						Postseason
Team	Year	G	W	L	T	Pts	Finish	Result
DET	1979–80	9	2	7	0	(4)	5th in Norris	Missed playoffs
DET	1980–81	20	3	14	3	(9)	(fired)	—
Total		29	5	21	3	13		

== See also ==
- Captain (ice hockey)
- List of ice hockey line nicknames
- Production line (hockey)
- List of NHL players with 1,000 games played
- Net Worth at IMDb

Awards
Preceded by Roy Conacher	Winner of the Art Ross Trophy; 1950	Succeeded by Gordie Howe
Sporting positions
Preceded by Sid Abel	Detroit Red Wings captain 1952–56	Succeeded by Red Kelly
Preceded by Alex Delvecchio	General manager of the Detroit Red Wings; 1977–80	Succeeded by Jimmy Skinner
Preceded by Bobby Kromm	Head coach of the Detroit Red Wings; 1980	Succeeded by Wayne Maxner
Preceded by Bill Mazer (in 1966)	Lead color commentator, NHL on NBC; 1972-1975	Succeeded by John Davidson (in 1990)
Preceded by Jim Gordon	American network television color commentator 1972-1975	Succeeded by Stan Mikita, Garry Unger, Chico Resch, and Curt Bennett
