= List of ice hockey line nicknames =

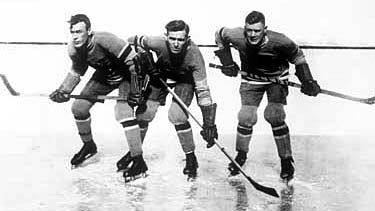
The New York Rangers’ famous "Bread Line" that played between 1926 and 1937. It consisted of Hall of Famers Bill Cook, Bun Cook and Frank Boucher.

In ice hockey, three forwards – centre, right wing and left wing – operate as a unit called a line. The tradition of naming the lines extends back to the inaugural 1917–18 NHL season, when Didier Pitre, Jack Laviolette, and Newsy Lalonde of the Montreal Canadiens were dubbed the "Flying Frenchmen Line".

== Lines with nicknames ==
Line name	Members	Team	League	Description	Date	Refs.
That 70s Line	Tanner Pearson, Jeff Carter, Tyler Toffoli	Los Angeles Kings	NHL	Pearson wore the number 70 on his jersey; Carter the number 77; and Toffoli the number 73. Named in reference to That '70s Show.	2013-2018	
The Black Aces	Herb Carnegie, Ossie Carnegie, Manny McIntire	Quebec Aces	QSHL	The first all-black line in the Quebec Senior Hockey League.	1940s	
The Century Line	Syl Apps Jr., Lowell MacDonald, Jean Pronovost	Pittsburgh Penguins	NHL	Named by their team publicist after the line scored over 100 goals in the 1973–1974 season.	1973–1976	
The Coneheads	Mark Pavelich, John Harrington, Buzz Schneider	United States Men's National Team		Part of the Miracle on Ice team that won the gold medal at the 1980 Winter Olympics. All three grew up playing pickup games on ponds in the Iron Range of Northeast Minnesota. They named themselves after the Saturday Night Live sketch.	1980	
The Dynasty Line	Guy Lafleur, Steve Shutt, Pete Mahovlich (later replaced by Jacques Lemaire)	Montreal Canadiens	NHL		1970s	
The Espo Line	Wayne Cashman, Phil Esposito, Ken Hodge	Boston Bruins	NHL	Named after their center, Esposito.	1967–1975	
The French Connection	Gilbert Perreault, Rick Martin, Rene Robert	Buffalo Sabres	NHL	Named after the Oscar-winning 1971 film, as all three players were French-Canadian.	1972–1979	
The GAG Line	Rod Gilbert, Jean Ratelle, Vic Hadfield	New York Rangers	NHL	The name is an acronym for "Goal-A-Game", in reference to the line's high average scoring output.	1966-1974	
The Grind Line	Kris Draper, Joe Kocur (replaced by Darren McCarty after 1998 season), Kirk Maltby	Detroit Red Wings	NHL		late 1990s-early 2000s	
The Grumpy Old Men	Kirk Muller, John MacLean, Mike Keane	Dallas Stars	NHL	Named after a reference to the 1993 film Grumpy Old Men. When the three veterans played for the Dallas Stars in 2001, they had 105 years and five Stanley Cup wins between them.	2001	
The HBK Line	Carl Hagelin, Nick Bonino, Phil Kessel	Pittsburgh Penguins	NHL	While technically the Penguins’ third line during their 2016 and 2017 Stanley Cup championship seasons, the name is taken from the first letters of their last names. Their most famous fan was pro wrestler Shawn Michaels, aka “The Heartbreak Kid”.	2016-2017	
The HOT Line	Bobby Hull, Anders Hedberg, Ulf Nilsson	Winnipeg Jets	WHA	They achieved this name because of their incredibly fast, high-scoring, and explosive offensive style.	1974–1978	
The Kid Line	Busher Jackson, Joe Primeau, Charlie Conacher	Toronto Maple Leafs	NHL	At the time of the line's formation, Primeau was 23 years old, while both Conacher and Jackson were only 18.	1930-1938	
The KLM Line	Vladimir Krutov, Igor Larionov, Sergei Makarov	Soviet national team		The KLM Line was the top line on the dominant Soviet national teams of the 1980s. They won gold medals at the 1984 and 1988 Winter Olympics. Together with the top defensive pairing of Slava Fetisov and Alexei Kasatonov, the five of them were collectively known as "The Green Unit" because of the green jerseys they wore in practice.	1980s	
The Kraut Line	Milt Schmidt, Woody Dumart, Bobby Bauer	Boston Bruins	NHL	Named for the German ancestry shared by all three, who grew up together in Kitchener, Ontario.	1936–1947	
The Legion of Doom	Eric Lindros, John LeClair, Mikael Renberg	Philadelphia Flyers	NHL	Named as all weighed over 220 pounds, ranged from 6'2" to 6'4" tall, and had a very physical playing style.	1994–1997	
The LILCO Line	Billy Harris, Clark Gillies, Bryan Trottier	New York Islanders	NHL	Named after the Long Island Lighting Company because they lit the lamps so often with their goal-scoring.	1970s	
The Mafia Line	Phil Esposito, Don Maloney, Don Murdoch	New York Rangers	NHL	Named for the "godfather" Phil Esposito and his two "dons", Don Maloney and Don Murdoch.	late 1970s	
The Merlot Line	Gregory Campbell, Shawn Thornton, Daniel Paille	Boston Bruins	NHL	Named after the merlot-colored practice jerseys they would wear as the team's fourth line. They helped the Bruins to a Stanley Cup in 2011.	2010-2014	
The Perfection Line	Patrice Bergeron, Brad Marchand, David Pastrňák	Boston Bruins	NHL		2014–2022	
The Pizza Line	Dany Heatley, Jason Spezza, Daniel Alfredsson	Ottawa Senators	NHL	In 2005, the Ottawa Senators ran a promotion with Canadian pizza restaurant Pizza Pizza where fans in attendance at home games would get free slices of pizza if the Senators scored five or more goals. Due to the line's extremely high scoring output, the promotion went into effect much more often than anticipated.	2005-2009	
The Pony Line	Doug Bentley, Max Bentley, Bill Mosienko	Chicago Blackhawks	NHL	All three players on the line stood less than 5'10" and weighed under 160 lbs.	1940-1943, 1945-1948	
The Production Line	Sid Abel, Gordie Howe, Ted Lindsay	Detroit Red Wings	NHL	Named in reference to their prolific goal production as well as the automotive industry in Detroit. The line was put together by head coach Tommy Ivan in 1947.	1947-1952	
The Punch Line	Hector "Toe" Blake, Elmer Lach, Maurice "Rocket" Richard	Montreal Canadiens	NHL	The trio was the top line on the Montreal Canadiens from 1943 to 1948 and won two Stanley Cups.	1943–1948	
The S Line	Nels Stewart, Babe Siebert, Hooley Smith	Montreal Maroons	NHL		1927–1932	
The Triple Crown Line	Dave Taylor, Charlie Simmer, Marcel Dionne	Los Angeles Kings	NHL	Named after their achievements; in 1980–81, the trio combined for 328 points to become the first line in NHL history where each player scored 100 points or more in the same season.	1979–1984	
The Trio Grande	Mike Bossy, Clark Gillies, Bryan Trottier	New York Islanders	NHL	The Trio Grande won four Stanley Cups with the New York Islanders in the 1980s, and all three are in the Hockey Hall of Fame.	1980s	
The Uke Line	Johnny Bucyk, Bronco Horvath, Vic Stasiuk	Boston Bruins	NHL	Named for their common Ukrainian heritage.	1957–1961	
The West Coast Express	Markus Naslund, Brendan Morrison, Todd Bertuzzi	Vancouver Canucks	NHL	Named as a reference to the local commuter rail service of the same name.	2000–2006	
The Sleepover Line	Tyler Toffoli, Macklin Celebrini, Will Smith	San Jose Sharks	NHL	Named for a viral moment in which veteran Tyler Toffoli slept on a cot in then-rookies Will Smith and Macklin Celebrini's hotel room.	2025-2026	
The Wife Line	Laura Stacey, Marie-Philip Poulin, Abby Roque	Montreal Victoire	PWHL	Named for the fact that Poulin and Stacey are married.	2025-2026	
The Identity Line	Matt Martin, Casey Cizikas, Cal Clutterbuck	New York Islanders	NHL		2013-2024	
The A Line	Patrik Eliáš, Jason Arnott, Petr Sýkora	New Jersey Devils	NHL	Led the Devils to two consecutive Stanley Cup Final appearances in 2000 and 2001, winning in 2000.	1999-2002	

== See also ==
- The Russian Five
