= Jimmy Skinner =

Canadian ice hockey coach

- Born: James Donald Skinner; January 12, 1917; Selkirk, Manitoba, Canada
- Died: July 11, 2007 (aged 90); Windsor, Ontario, Canada
- Occupations: head coach for the Detroit Red Wings (1954-58) general manager for the Detroit Red Wings (1980-82)
- Awards: Stanley Cup (1955)

Jimmy Skinner
- Height: 5 ft 9 in (175 cm)
- Weight: 180 lb (82 kg; 12 st 12 lb)
- Position: Defence
- Shot: Right
- Played for: Selkirk Fishermen; Winnipeg Rangers; Winnipeg Falcons; Flin Flon Bombers; Omaha Knights; Indianapolis Capitals
- Playing career: 1938–1947

James Donald Skinner (January 12, 1917 – July 11, 2007) was the head coach, chief scout, and farm director, director of player personnel, director of hockey operations, assistant general manager, and general manager for the Detroit Red Wings of the National Hockey League.

== Playing career ==
Skinner played for the Selkirk Fishermen, Winnipeg Rangers and the Winnipeg Falcons in his teens. He was offered a contract with New York Rangers but declined the offer and played for the Flin Flon Bombers instead. Skinner was a member of the Bombers team, which won the Sask. Senior Hockey League Championship in 1938.

Skinner would later move on to serve as a player/coach for the Omaha Knights, followed by a stint with the Indianapolis Capitals playing alongside his brother, Morden Huron Lake "Ducky" Skinner in 1943. Skinner's playing career ended prematurely as a result of injuries. It was at that time, that Skinner opted to enter the coaching ranks.

== Coaching career ==
Skinner was hired to coach the Windsor Spitfires by Jack Adams in 1947, staying in the position until 1953, when he became the head coach of the Hamilton Red Wings, where he guided the team to a Memorial Cup victory in 1962.

At the end of the 1953-54 season, Skinner was hired by Adams to serve as the head coach for the Detroit Red Wings. As a rookie head coach, Skinner guided the Red Wings to a victory over the Montreal Canadiens in the 1955 Stanley Cup Final, which wound up being the last time the Red Wings won the trophy until 1997. Skinner is credited with starting the tradition of kissing the Stanley Cup upon victory.

In the 1956-57 season, Skinner guided the Red Wings to a first-place finish in the standings, before being defeated by the Boston Bruins in the 1957 Stanley Cup playoffs.

Skinner resigned as the Red Wings head coach in 1958, due to illness. Skinner finished his coaching career with a record of 123–78–46, coaching in three National Hockey League All-Star Games from 1954 to 1958. Skinner continued to work for the team in different managerial duties, before his retirement in 1983.

Skinner was credited with the implementation of the NHL entry draft, which was meant to give teams a chance to select players outside their territorial region.

Skinner was inducted into numerous sports hall of fame for his contributions. He was first inducted into the Detroit Red Wings Hall of Fame in 1977 and the Windsor Essex County Sports Hall of Fame as a founder in 2006.

Skinner was inducted as a builder into both the Manitoba Hockey Hall of Fame in 1986 and the Manitoba Sports Hall of Fame on May 24, 2014.

== Personal life ==
Skinner had two brothers, Gordon and Morden (Ducky). After their father James Skinner Sr. died, the three of them inherited "Skinner's" restaurant (established in 1929) located in Lockport, Manitoba, Canada.

Skinner married Vivian Anna Reynolds in 1943. The couple had four children, Holly, Karen, Tess, and James (Jr). Skinner died in Windsor, Ontario on July 11, 2007, six months after his wife's death.

Both of Skinner's nicknames, "Jimmy" and "Jimmie", were used in his professional playing and coaching careers.

== Coaching record ==
Team	Year	Regular season						Postseason			
Team	Year	G	W	L	T	Pts	Finish	W	L	Win %	Result
DET	1954–55	70	42	17	11	95	1st in NHL	8	3	.727	Won Stanley Cup (MTL)
DET	1955–56	70	30	24	16	76	2nd in NHL	5	5	.500	Lost in Stanley Cup Final (MTL)
DET	1956–57	70	38	20	12	88	1st in NHL	1	4	.200	Lost in Semifinals (BOS)
DET	1957–58	37	13	17	7	(70)	(resigned)	—	—	—	—
NHL Total		247	123	78	46			14	12	.538	

Preceded by Tommy Ivan	Head coach of the Detroit Red Wings; 1954–1958	Succeeded by Sid Abel
Preceded by Ted Lindsay	General manager of the Detroit Red Wings; 1980–82	Succeeded by Jim Devellano
