= Production Line (ice hockey) =

Detroit Red Wings scoring trio

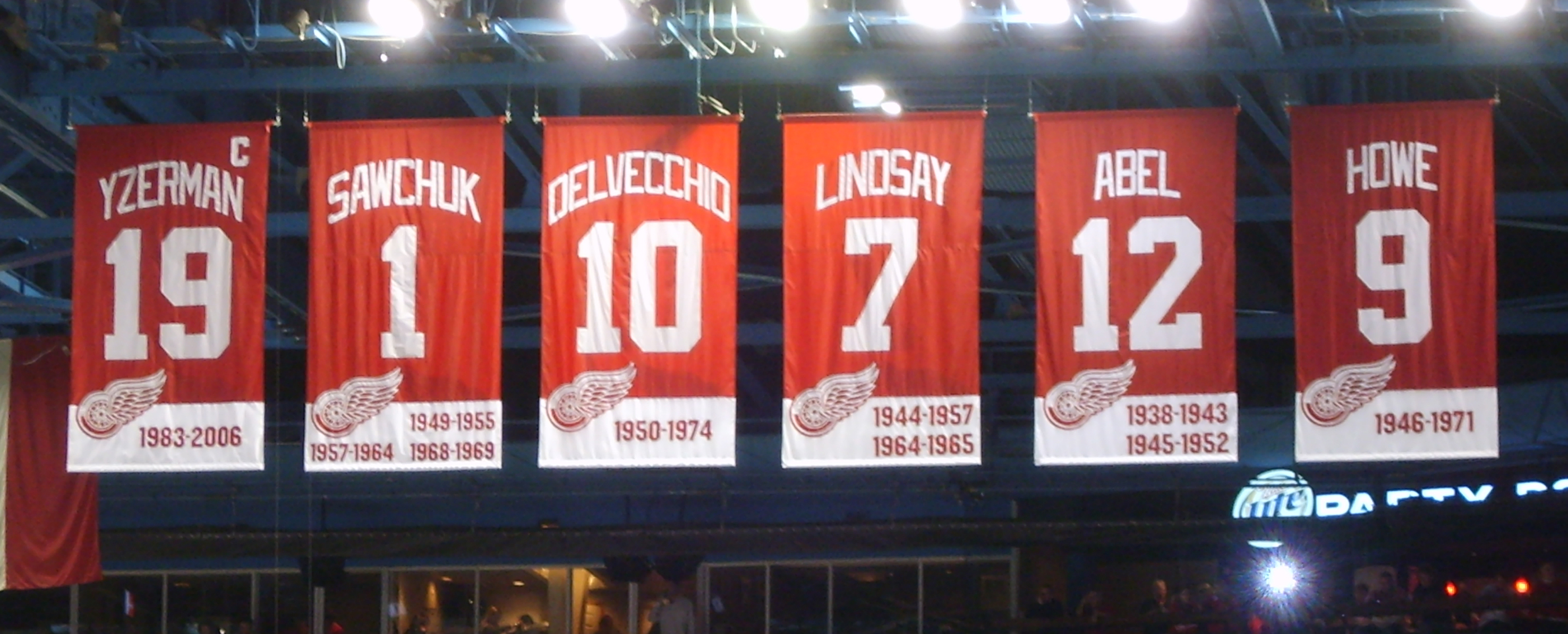
Retired jerseys of Lindsay (7), Abel (12), and Howe (9) at Joe Louis Arena in Detroit in 2007

The Production Line was a nickname for one of the most famous scoring lines in the history of the National Hockey League (NHL). The line consisted of Gordie Howe (right wing), Sid Abel (centre) and Ted Lindsay (left wing) of the Detroit Red Wings, all members of the Hockey Hall of Fame.

== History ==
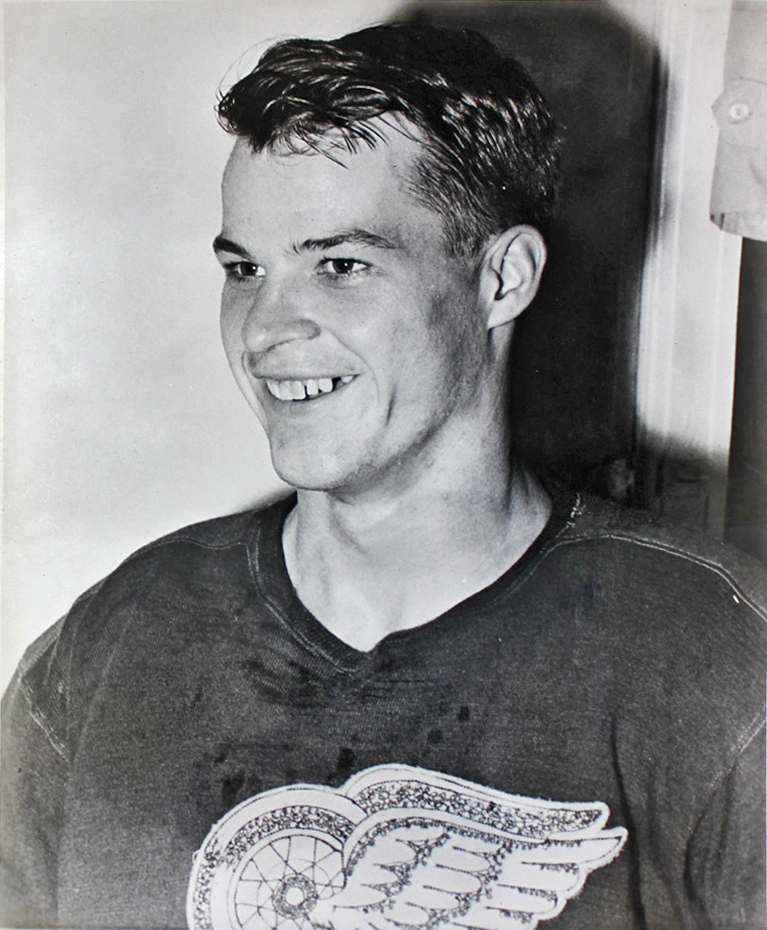
Gordie Howe during his rookie season of 1946–47

In 1947, Tommy Ivan replaced Jack Adams as head coach of the Detroit Red Wings and instantly put the two best players on the squad (Gordie Howe and Ted Lindsay) on either side of centre Sid Abel. Abel was in the twilight of his career but Ivan knew that he could still be a threat with two lightning fast wingers that could cover for his slowness and bring out the best in him. Howe and Lindsay were the best of friends with both having immense respect for Abel.

The trio would often stay late after practice and fool around with the puck. The fooling around paid off, as the trio would perfect one of hockey's greatest plays—the set play. To take advantage of the speed of the wingers and to minimize the problems of having a slow centre, the wingers would shoot the puck into the opponents' end after crossing center ice. They would angle their shoot-in so that the puck would bounce off the boards and slide to the front of the goal where the other winger could get to it. That winger would either make a quick pass to Abel in the slot or take a shot himself. It was a brilliant play for the era because goaltenders of the period rarely left the goal crease, and would not think to cut off the shoot-in or block the pass in front. The trio also found numerous other ways to hit the back of net off their ability to read each other and come together as a unit.

In the 1947–48 season, the trio was tops on the team in scoring. In the 1949–50 season, when Lindsay won the Art Ross Trophy, having led the league with 78 points, the three finished 1st, 2nd, and 3rd in NHL scoring, a feat yet to be repeated. (Note: The feat of linemates finishing one-two-three in league scoring had happened twice prior: by the 1939–40 Kraut line of the Boston Bruins and by the 1944–45 Punch line of the Montreal Canadiens.) Both fans and media scrambled to come up with a catchy nickname for the threesome and soon enough, somebody coined a term that described the importance of the line to the team as well as a reference to Detroit, the car-making capital of the United States—the "Production Line" was born, appearing in print by late March 1950. In April, the Red Wings won the 1950 Stanley Cup Finals over the New York Rangers in seven games, albeit without Howe, due to injury in an earlier round of the playoffs. Howe went on to win the next four Art Ross Trophies, and finished in the top five in scoring for the next 20 seasons.

The line is mentioned in the lyrics of the song, "Gordie Howe" by Bob Davies — "There was Howe, Lindsay, Abel, a line we can't forget / The greatest line in history, not to be equalled yet / Sid would pass to Lindsay, Ted then back to Howe / He flicked his wrist in lightning speed / And a big roar from the crowd."

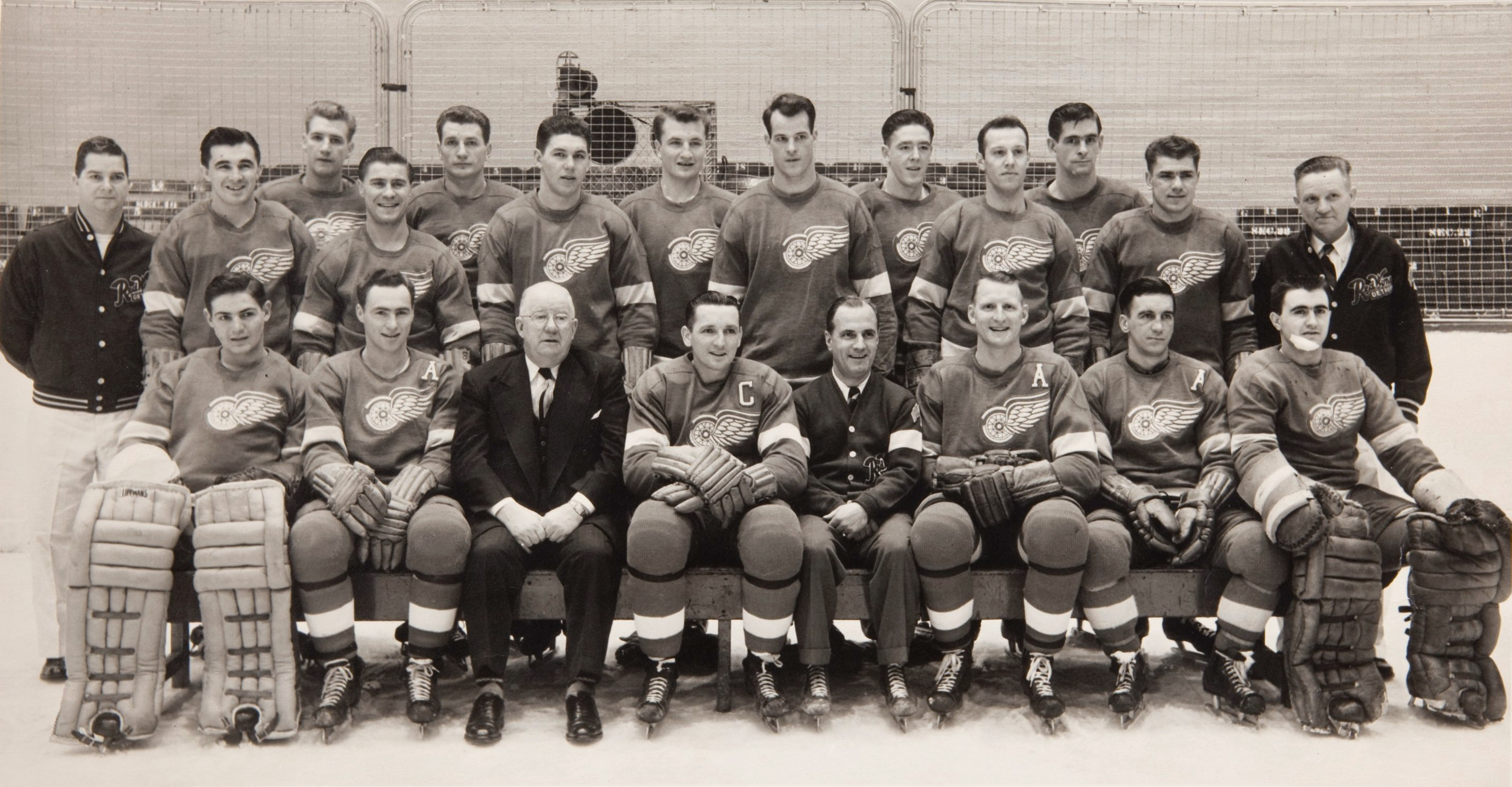
Team photo of the 1951–52 Red Wings, winners of the 1952 Stanley Cup Finals and the final season of the original Production Line. Abel is in the front row wearing the captain's "C". Lindsay is the rightmost non-goaltender in the front row. Howe is the tallest player in the back row, slightly right of Abel.

Abel died in 2000 at age 81; his NHL playing career spanned 1938–1954 and he was inducted to the Hockey Hall of Fame in 1969. Howe died in 2016, aged 88; his playing career initially spanned 1946–1971 and he was inducted to the Hall of Fame in 1972, but he then returned to play in the World Hockey Association, ultimately retiring in 1980 at age 52. Lindsay died in 2019, aged 93; his playing career spanned 1944–1960 and 1964–1965; he was inducted to the Hall of Fame in 1966.

== Production Line II ==
After the 1951–52 season, Sid Abel was traded to the Chicago Black Hawks to make room for another talented, albeit younger, center. Alex Delvecchio joined the team and continued to dominate the league as the center of the famed "Production Line II". Prior to Delvecchio establishing himself as a number one center, Norm Ullman and Earl Reibel took turns centering Lindsay and Howe.

== Production Line III ==
In the late 1960s, Frank Mahovlich replaced the retired Ted Lindsay at wing for another iteration of the Production Line.
