= List of Detroit Red Wings general managers =

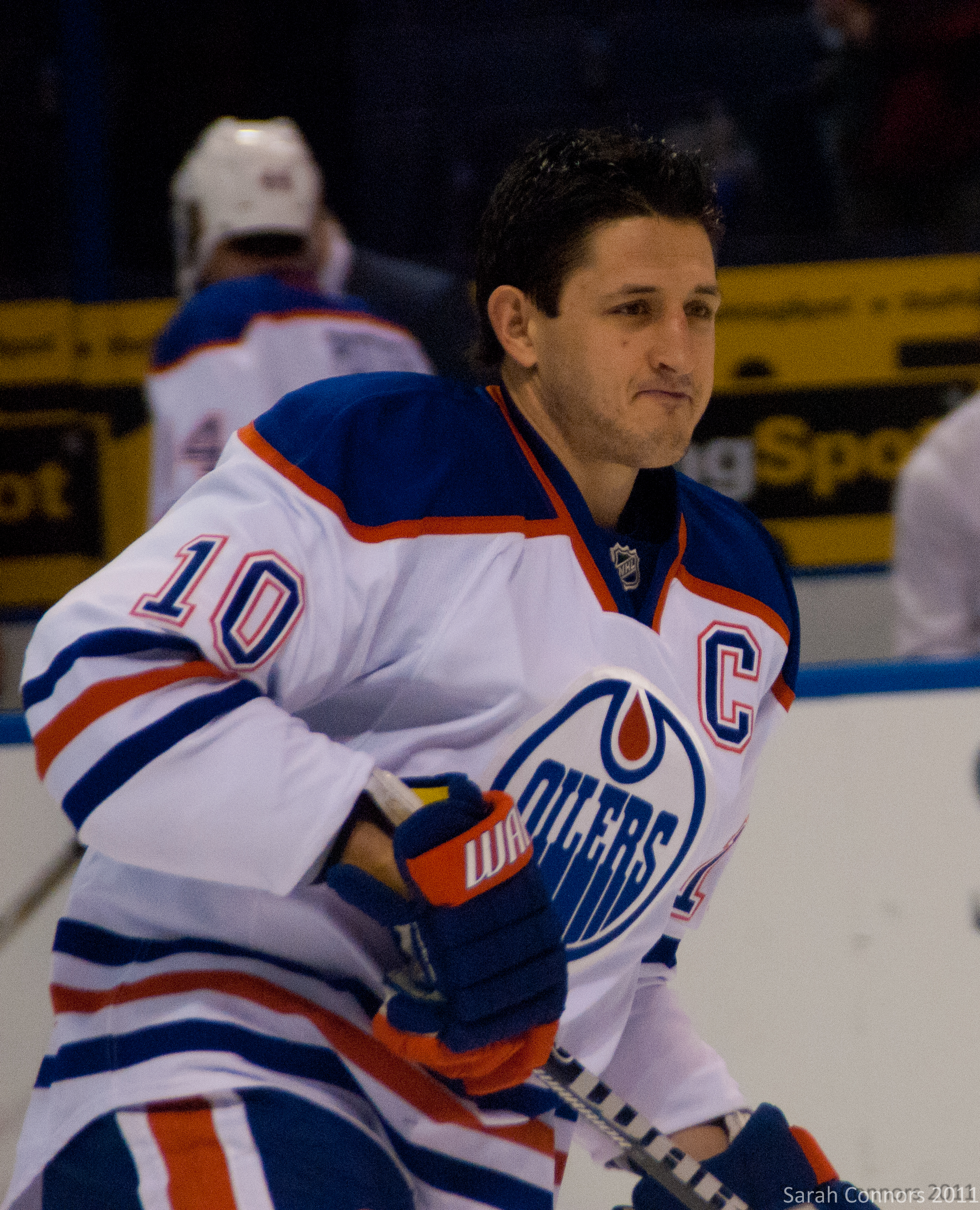
Shawn Horcoff has been Detroit's interim general manager since 2026.

The Detroit Red Wings are a professional ice hockey team based in Detroit, Michigan. They are members of the Atlantic Division in the Eastern Conference of the National Hockey League (NHL) and are one of the Original Six teams of the league. The general manager (GM) of the team "oversees all aspects of Detroit's hockey operations including all matters relating to player personnel, development, contract negotiations and player movements." There have been twelve general managers in franchise history; two during the era of the Detroit Cougars (1926–30) and Detroit Falcons (1930–32) and the rest under the Detroit Red Wings (1932–present). The first was Art Duncan for the 1926–27 season; he also served as head coach and was also a defenseman and team captain.

Jack Adams took over as coach and GM for the 1927–28 season. He served as coach through the 1946–47 season and remained in the general manager position until 1962. As both head coach and general manager, Adams built and guided the team to its first three Stanley Cup titles in 1936, 1937, and 1943, and after turning the head coach position over to others the team won four more Cup titles in 1950, 1952, 1954, and 1955. Adams earned the nickname "Trader Jack" for his willingness to make high-profile deals; in 1955, just after the Stanley Cup Final, he traded starting goaltender Terry Sawchuk to the Boston Bruins, elevating Glenn Hall to the starting role. In 1957 he traded Hall and star left wing Ted Lindsay to the Chicago Black Hawks and reacquired Sawchuk by giving up Johnny Bucyk to the Bruins.

Adams left the club in April 1962 and was replaced with Sid Abel, who was also head coach. First under Abel as GM and then Ned Harkness, Alex Delvecchio, Lindsay, and Jimmy Skinner in the position, the Red Wings suffered a long period of decline, from 1967 until 1983, during which they made the playoffs only twice. They did not appear in the Finals in this time and only won one of the three series they appeared in, beating the Atlanta Flames two games to none in 1978.

In 1982, Mike Ilitch bought the team from Bruce Norris. Ilitch hired Jim Devellano from the New York Islanders to replace Skinner as GM; Devellano had served as a scout and assistant general manager with the Islanders, where he won the Stanley Cup three times. Under his leadership the Red Wings began a new era of success; in 1983 they drafted Steve Yzerman, who spent his entire career in Detroit, including a league record 20 years as team captain. The Red Wings returned to the playoffs in 1984 where they suffered a first round defeat to the St. Louis Blues. The team reached the Western Conference finals in both 1987 and 1988, losing to the Edmonton Oilers both times. Devellano became team vice president in 1990, handing over the general manager position to Bryan Murray for the 1990–91 season. The club made the playoffs that season and every season since; with Bryan Murray from 1990 to 1994, Devellano and head coach Scotty Bowman sharing general manager responsibilities from 1994 to 1997, and general manager Ken Holland, the team put together of a streak of 25 consecutive playoff appearances from 1991 to 2016. Under first Devellano, Bowman, and then Holland the team won the Stanley Cup in 1997, 1998, 2002, and 2008.

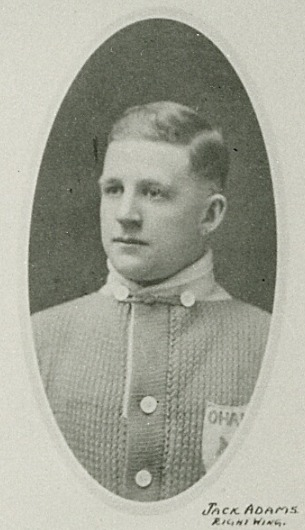
Jack Adams was general manager for 35 years, winning seven Stanley Cups

== Key ==
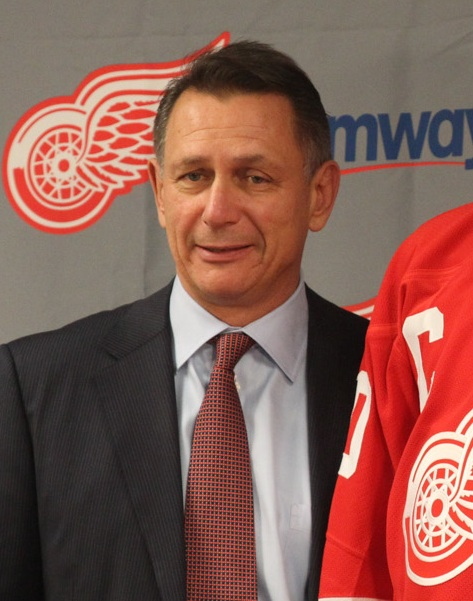
Ken Holland was general manager for 22 years, winning three Stanley Cups.

Key of terms and definitions
| Term | Definition |
|---|---|
| No. | Number of general managers^{[a]} |
| Refs | References |
| – | Does not apply |
| † | Elected to the Hockey Hall of Fame |

== General managers ==
General managers of the Detroit NHL franchise
| No. | Name | Appointment | Departure | Accomplishments and events during this term | Refs |
|---|---|---|---|---|---|
| 1 | Art Duncan | October 18, 1926 | May 14, 1927 | First team captain, head coach, and general manager of the franchise | |
| 2 | Jack Adams† | May 14, 1927 | April 26, 1962 | Won Stanley Cup seven times (1936, 1937, 1943, 1950, 1952, 1954, 1955) | |
| 3 | Sid Abel† | April 26, 1962 | January 6, 1971 | Appeared in Stanley Cup Final in 1963, 1964, and 1966 | |
| 4 | Ned Harkness | January 8, 1971 | February 6, 1974 | | |
| 5 | Alex Delvecchio† | May 21, 1974 | March 16, 1977 | | |
| 6 | Ted Lindsay† | March 16, 1977 | April 11, 1980 | | |
| 7 | Jimmy Skinner | April 11, 1980 | July 12, 1982 | Mike Ilitch purchased team from Bruce Norris in 1982 | |
| 8 | Jim Devellano† | July 12, 1982 | July 13, 1990 | Team reached conference finals in 1987 and 1988 | |
| 9 | Bryan Murray | July 13, 1990 | June 3, 1994 | Club began streak of 25 consecutive playoff appearances (1990/91 thru 2015/16) | |
| 10 | Jim Devellano† and Scotty Bowman† | June 3, 1994 | July 18, 1997 | Won Stanley Cup (1997) | |
| 11 | Ken Holland† | July 18, 1997 | April 19, 2019 | Won Stanley Cup three times (1998, 2002, 2008) | |
| 12 | Steve Yzerman† | April 19, 2019 | September 15, 2026^{[b]} | | |
| – | Shawn Horcoff (interim) | September 15, 2026 | – | | |

== Notes ==
- ^{a} A running total of the number of general managers of the Red Wings; thus, any individual who has two or more separate terms as general manager is only counted once.
- ^{b} On July 15, 2026, Yzerman announced that he would step down as general manager ahead of the 2026–27 season; however, he remained in the role until a successor was named.
