= The Hockey News =

Canadian ice hockey magazine, founded 1947

- Editor: Ryan Kennedy
- Former editors: Bob McKenzie (1982–1991); Steve Dryden (1991–2001); Jason Kay (2001–2021)
- Categories: Sports
- Founded: 1947
- Company: Roustan Media
- Country: Canada
- Based in: Toronto, Ontario
- Language: English
- Website: thehockeynews.com
- ISSN: 0018-3016

The Hockey News (THN) is a Canadian-based ice hockey magazine. The Hockey News was founded in 1947 by Ken McKenzie and Will Cote and has since become the most recognized hockey publication in North America. The magazine has a readership of 225,000 people per issue, while the magazine's website counts two million total readers. It is the top-selling hockey magazine in North America and is available through subscription in North America and digitally to the rest of the world. The Hockey News is also available at many newsstands in North America.

Previously owned by Transcontinental Media and the TVA Group, The Hockey News was purchased by Roustan Media on January 26, 2018.

== History ==
The Hockey News was founded in Montreal, Quebec, Canada, in 1947 by Ken McKenzie and Will Cote. It is the second-oldest publication in North America devoted to one sport, following only Ring Magazine (a boxing-based publication), which was founded in 1922. Readership developed quickly in the infancy of The Hockey News with circulation reaching 20,000 copies within the first year of the publication's history; increasing to 50,000 by the year 1967 – when the National Hockey League (NHL) expanded from six franchises to 12 – before reaching 100,000 a half-decade later in 1972.

McKenzie assumed full ownership of The Hockey News in 1968 after buying out founding partner Cote. He remained in control of the publication until selling it to Whitney Communications of New York in 1973. Despite the sale, McKenzie stayed with The Hockey News as its publisher until 1980.

Toward the end of McKenzie's run with The Hockey News, some major overhauls began to take place. Printed and based out of Montreal since its very beginnings, The Hockey News officially moved its offices to downtown Toronto in 1979. From the time of the move until 2003, printing mainly took place in a cluster of three southwestern Ontario cities (Hamilton, Pickering and Toronto) as well as some of the duties remaining in Montreal. In 2003, the printing of the magazine moved to Owen Sound, Ontario.

At this time Tom Murray was brought on as the new editor. Under his stewardship The Hockey News began to take on more of an edge and also began the use of colour on some pages of the publication for the first time. Award-winning Canadian journalist Bob McKenzie – no relation to founder Ken McKenzie – took over from Murray as editor in 1982. During this time the editorial slant became even tougher. With Bob McKenzie at the helm, The Hockey News first introduced several "Special Issues," many of which remain staples of the magazine to this day, including Season and Draft Preview editions and the annual Yearbook.

Whitney Communications sold The Hockey News to Transcontinental, Inc. in 1986. Five years later, Steve Dryden was brought in to replace the departing Bob McKenzie as editor. Like with the previous change in the editor, Dryden's tenure brought with it many new special editions of the publication, including Future Watch, People of Power and Influence and Season in Review. Although many changes were undertaken from the nascent days of the publication until 2003, The Hockey News had remained, at its base, a tabloid newspaper the entire duration of that period. In 2003, the move was made to being a full-colour publication, complete with full bleeds and stapled pages. This restructuring was overseen by Jason Kay, who replaced Dryden in 2001 and remains the brand's editor in chief to this day. These changes were built upon when, in 2007, The Hockey News moved to be a full-blown magazine, with a glossy cover and 8 x 10-inch pages.

In November 2014, Transcontinental sold The Hockey News and 14 other consumer magazines to Quebecor Media's Groupe TVA for $55.5 million. This made it a sister to the Quebecois sports network TVA Sports, which had become the national French-language rightsholder of the NHL in Canada. It was in turn sold to W. Graeme Roustan in 2018. In January 2020, The Hockey News announced an editorial partnership with Sports Illustrated (whose editorial operation was recently sold to theMaven, Inc.), under which content from The Hockey News would be featured on SI.com, and the two would collaborate on a network of team-specific websites.

In March 2020, six days after the NHL announced the suspension of the regular season due to COVID-19, THN suspended publication and laid off eight full time staff, including editor-in-chief Jason Kay and senior writer Ryan Kennedy, while assigning two contract workers to update content on the magazine's website. Kay returned when THN resumed full operation, and was still editor-in-chief in 2021, but the magazine was operating without an editor-in-chief by early 2022. In the fall of 2022, coincident with the first issue of its 76th publishing year, Ryan Kennedy became editor-in-chief.

== Brand extensions ==
The Hockey News has remained primarily a magazine-based publication since the move to the format in 2007. However, forays have been made into different platforms over the years. First, in the 1980s and 1990s – while The Hockey News was still a tabloid newspaper – they launched The Hockey News TV Show on Canada's two major broadcasters, first TSN and then SportsNet. The Hockey News has also published several books over the years, including Hockey's Young Guns, The Pursuit of Hockeyness and We Are The Champions. In addition, The Hockey News had a radio show with Sirius XM radio before moving to their own platform with The Hockey News Podcast, their current audio/video-based offering.

== Digital media ==
The Hockey News' website was launched in the latter stages of the 1990s. The publication became the first hockey-only application on the market when it launched its mobile platform in 2009. Two years later, a tablet app would be added to the original mobile setup. The Hockey News also has a strong social media presence with 292,000 followers on Twitter, 288,000 likes on Facebook and 29,000 followers on Instagram.

== Notable Special Issues ==
• Draft Preview: A breakdown of the NHL's top prospects headed into each June's NHL entry draft.
• Season Preview: Awards predictions, standings prognostications and more.
• Ultimate Pool Guide: In-depth reports on each of the NHL's 32 teams' depth charts and prospects rankings as well as stat projections for players of fantasy hockey.
• Yearbook: The ultimate breakdown of every aspect of the NHL, including: team breakdowns, franchise information, predictions, and analysis of each team.
• Money and Power: An inside look at the business of hockey and an in-depth report on the most powerful and influential movers and shakers in the hockey world.

== In popular culture ==
In the 1977 American sports comedy film, Slap Shot, character Reggie 'Reg' Dunlop, portrayed by Paul Newman, teases an opponent on the ice that he's been dropped by his NHL club, which appears to be news to him (probably because it's not true), to which Dunlop replies "it was in The Hockey News, I'll save it for you."

== Awards and recognition ==
Over the years The Hockey News became known at 'The Bible of Hockey,' a name stemming from the fact that it was the unquestioned source for information regarding the hockey world, especially prior to the ubiquitousness of the internet and the evolution of sports-only cable networks. Even in modern times, The Hockey News is considered the go-to source for hockey information as it is 'all hockey, all the time,' and is in circulation year-round, even during the summer months when other publications see a lull in hockey coverage. Unlike other Canadian publications which cover hockey, The Hockey News has no connection with the NHL allowing for more editorial latitude. They are particularly well-recognized for their coverage of prospects – younger players who've yet to make it to the professional ranks. Issues such as Future Watch, Draft Preview and the more-recent Prospects Unlimited are widely quoted within media circles and even used by some NHL teams. Hockey News founder Ken McKenzie was recognized by the Hockey Hall of Fame with the Elmer Ferguson Award for excellence in hockey journalism in 1997. Bob McKenzie (no relation), editor of The Hockey News between 1982 and 1991, was awarded the same distinction in 2015.

== All-time NHL player rankings ==
In February 1997, The Hockey News announced that it would commemorate its 50th anniversary (in the 80th year of the NHL's founding) with a list of the 50 top NHL players of all time. The rankings were determined by a panel of judges that included past and present NHL general managers, coaches and players, as well some of the most eminent members of hockey media. Some on the panel had first-hand experience dating back to the 1930s, with close second-generation knowledge dating back to the original stars of the NHL – a historical memory that can no longer be repeated. When the list was finally issued, it heralded Wayne Gretzky as the best player in the history of the NHL.

In 1998, THN expanded the list and published it as a book: The Top 100 NHL Players of All Time. Their list again featured Gretzky as the top player, leading the top 10 players, in order: Wayne Gretzky, Bobby Orr, Gordie Howe, Mario Lemieux, Maurice Richard, Doug Harvey, Jean Beliveau, Bobby Hull, Terry Sawchuk and Eddie Shore. As of 2022, every player on the list has been elected to the Hockey Hall of Fame except for Jaromir Jagr (not yet retired, playing in Czech Extraliga as of 2023–24 season) and Lorne Chabot (played from 1926 to 1937).

Ten years later, in 2007, THN came out with a revised list in The Top 60 Since 1967, which limited the rankings to players solely of the NHL's post-expansion era. In addition to accounting for the 10 years that had passed since previous rankings, editor-in-chief Jason Kay explained that the list was revised to exclude the pre-expansion era because most analysts are not able to put the early NHL into sufficient context, adding that the original Top 50 publication "relied heavily on historical and statistical information to bring players of bygone eras into perspective."

In 2008, the THN staff participated in the selection of the IIHF Centennial All-Star Team.

In 2010, THN released a revised list of the top 100 players of all time, except this time it was top 20 players per position. The top player at each position: goaltender – Terry Sawchuk, defenceman – Bobby Orr, center – Wayne Gretzky, right wing – Gordie Howe, left wing – Bobby Hull.

== The Top 100 NHL Players of All Time ==
Players in bold were active when the book was published in October 1998. Flags of players born outside of Canada (regardless of later nationality) are included next to their names.

1. **Wayne Gretzky**
2. Bobby Orr
3. Gordie Howe
4. Mario Lemieux (Note: Lemieux was retired at the time the list was published, but returned later for parts of five more seasons.)
5. Maurice Richard
6. Doug Harvey
7. Jean Beliveau
8. Bobby Hull
9. Terry Sawchuk (Note: Sawchuk is the highest-ranked goaltender)
10. Eddie Shore
11. Guy Lafleur
12. **Mark Messier**
13. Jacques Plante
14. **Ray Bourque**
15. Howie Morenz
16. Glenn Hall
17. Stan Mikita (Note: Mikita is the highest-ranked (of six on the list) European-born player, though he was raised in Canada from a young age.) (Slovak Republic (1939–1945))
18. Phil Esposito
19. Denis Potvin
20. Mike Bossy
21. Ted Lindsay
22. **Patrick Roy**
23. Red Kelly
24. Bobby Clarke
25. Larry Robinson
26. Ken Dryden
27. Frank Mahovlich
28. Milt Schmidt
29. **Paul Coffey**
30. Henri Richard
31. Bryan Trottier
32. Dickie Moore
33. Newsy Lalonde
34. Syl Apps
35. Bill Durnan
36. Charlie Conacher
37. **Jaromir Jagr** (Note: Jagr is the highest-ranked European-born-and-trained player, as well as the final active player in the list.) (Czechoslovakia)
38. Marcel Dionne
39. Joe Malone
40. **Chris Chelios** (Note: Chelios is the highest-ranked (of three on the list) player born in the U.S.A.) (United States)
41. Dit Clapper
42. Bernie Geoffrion
43. Tim Horton
44. Bill Cook
45. Johnny Bucyk
46. George Hainsworth
47. Gilbert Perreault
48. Max Bentley
49. Brad Park
50. Jari Kurri (Finland)
51. Nels Stewart
52. King Clancy
53. Bill Cowley
54. **Eric Lindros**
55. Busher Jackson
56. Peter Stastny (Czechoslovakia)
57. Ted Kennedy
58. Andy Bathgate
59. Pierre Pilote
60. Turk Broda
61. Frank Boucher
62. Cy Denneny
63. Bernie Parent
64. **Brett Hull**
65. Aurel Joliat
66. Toe Blake
67. Frank Brimsek (United States)
68. Elmer Lach
69. Dave Keon
70. **Grant Fuhr**
71. **Brian Leetch** (United States)
72. Earl Seibert
73. Doug Bentley
74. Borje Salming (Sweden)
75. Georges Vezina
76. Charlie Gardiner
77. Clint Benedict
78. **Steve Yzerman**
79. Tony Esposito
80. Billy Smith
81. Serge Savard
82. Alex Delvecchio
83. Babe Dye
84. Lorne Chabot
85. Sid Abel
86. Bob Gainey
87. Johnny Bower
88. Sprague Cleghorn
89. Mike Gartner
90. Norm Ullman
91. Sweeney Schriner
92. Joe Primeau
93. Darryl Sittler
94. **Joe Sakic**
95. **Dominik Hasek** (Czechoslovakia)
96. Babe Pratt
97. Jack Stewart
98. Yvan Cournoyer
99. Bill Gadsby
100. Frank Nighbor
