= Kraut line =

Boston Bruins scoring trio consisting of German-Canadian players

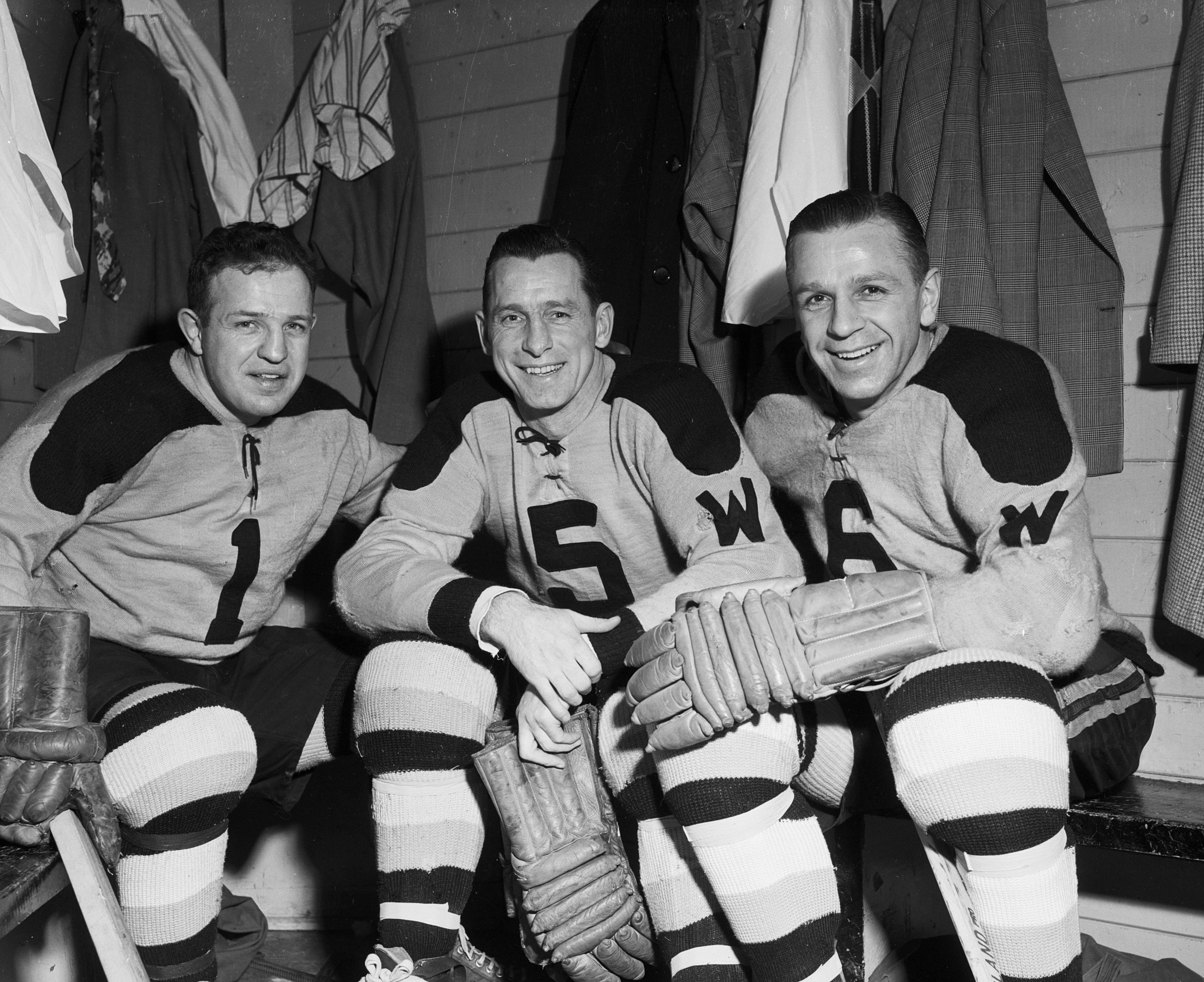
Bobby Bauer, Milt Schmidt and Woody Dumart at a 1952 exhibition game in Waterloo, Ontario.

The Kraut line were a trio of National Hockey League (NHL) players with the Boston Bruins, who played on the same forward line: center Milt Schmidt, left wing Woody Dumart, and right wing Bobby Bauer. The name was devised by Albert Leduc, a player for the Montreal Canadiens, while the trio were playing for a Boston farm club in 1936; originally "The Sauerkraut Line", the nickname was later shortened to "The Kraut Line". The name referenced the German descent of the three players, all of whom grew up in Kitchener, Ontario, where they previously played for the Kitchener Greenshirts. The trio played almost 1,900 NHL games with the Bruins, but put their careers on hold during World War II to serve in the Royal Canadian Air Force. They were one of the most dominant lines of any era, having finished first, second, and third in scoring during the 1939–40 NHL season, a feat repeated only twice; by the 1944–45 Punch line of the Montreal Canadiens, and the 1949–50 Production Line of the Detroit Red Wings. All three members of the Kraut line are inductees in the Hockey Hall of Fame.

== History ==
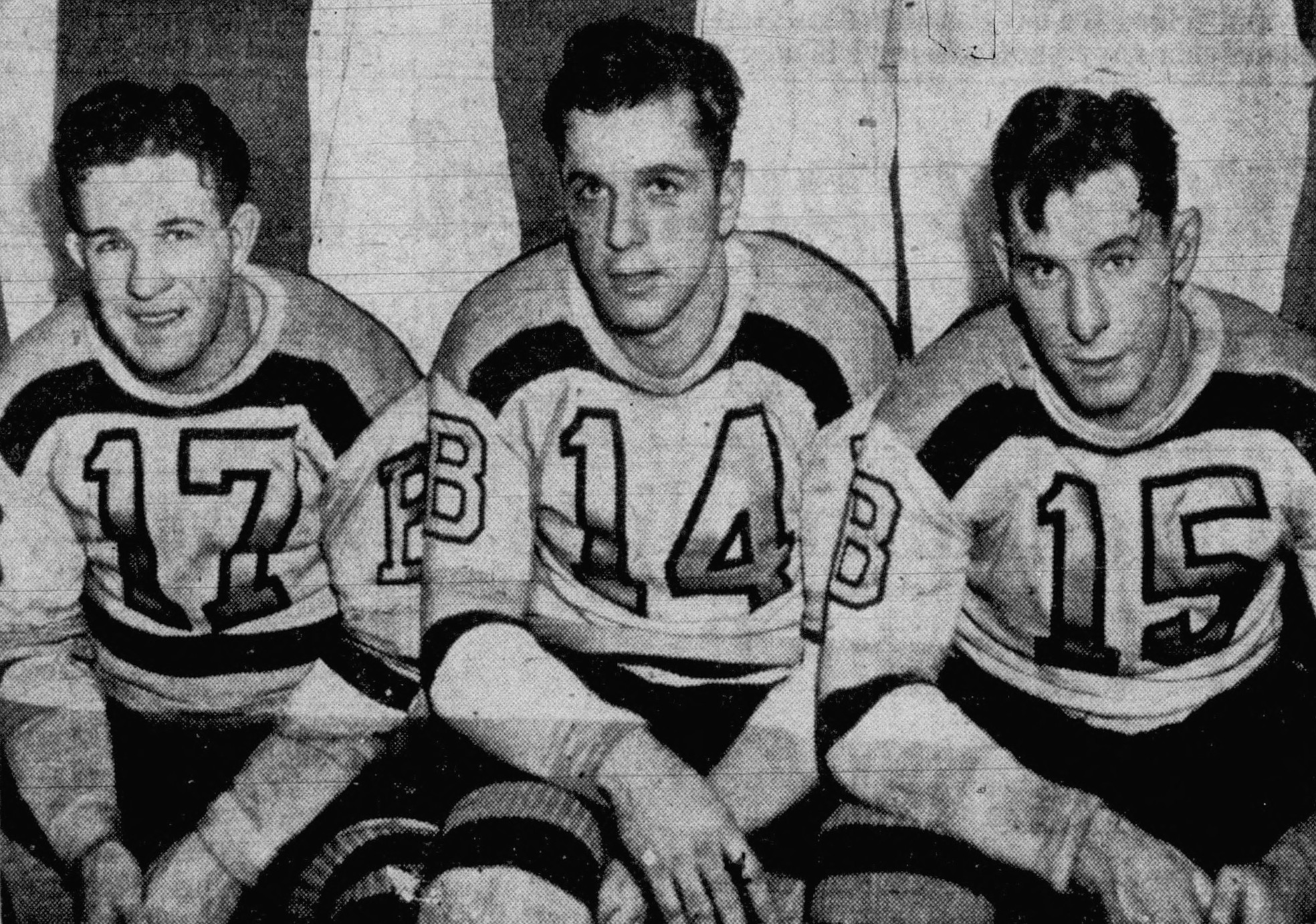
Bobby Bauer, Woody Dumart, and Milt Schmidt (left to right) in 1942

The three were famously attached and lived together in a single room in Brookline, Massachusetts. The line was so accomplished that, in the 1939–1940 season, the trio placed 1st, 2nd, and 3rd in NHL scoring. Schmidt led the league in scoring with 22 goals and 30 assists; Dumart was second in the league with 22 goals and 21 assists; and Bauer was third with 17 goals and 26 assists. While the line was intact, the Bruins won the Stanley Cup in the 1938–1939 and 1940–1941 seasons.

In the midst of World War II, the line enlisted with the Royal Canadian Air Force as a trio in 1942. On February 10, 1942, their last game before reporting for duty, the line accounted for half of the 22 points in goals and assists that the Bruins accumulated on the way to an 8–1 victory over Montreal at the Boston Garden. The Kraut line produced three goals and eight assists. Not long after enlisting, the trio played for the Ottawa RCAF Flyers, helping them to win the 1942 Allen Cup. During the war, contests were held to change towards a non-Germanic name for the line; "The Kitchener Kids" became one of the favorites, but the old name returned at the end of the war.

Bobby Bauer's retirement in 1947 ended the line. On March 18, 1952, the line participated in a special reunion game in which Schmidt scored his 200th career goal and Bauer had a goal and an assist, despite having been retired the five previous years, in a 4-0 victory over the Chicago Black Hawks.

After their days as players, Schmidt eventually became the coach, and later general manager, of the Bruins. Bauer went back to the Kitchener area and coached several teams. Dumart retired in Boston, where he worked for some years as the official scorer at the Garden. All three were inducted into the Hockey Hall of Fame: Schmidt in 1961, Dumart in 1992, and Bauer in 1996.

The trio is deceased. Bauer died on September 16, 1964, at age 49; Dumart died on October 19, 2001, at age 84; Schmidt died on January 4, 2017, at age 98.

== Statistics ==
Note: These are statistics from the seven regular seasons in which the three players generally played on the same line.

- GP = Games played; G = Goals; A = Assists; Pts = Points; PIM = Penalty in Minutes

Year	GP	G	A	Pts	PIM
Milt Schmidt
1937–38	44	13	14	27	15
1938–39	41	15	17	32	13
1939–40	48	22	30	52	37
1940–41	45	13	25	38	23
1941–42	36	14	21	35	34
1945–46	48	13	18	31	21
1946–47	59	27	35	62	40
Woody Dumart
1937–38	48	13	14	27	6
1938–39	45	14	15	29	2
1939–40	48	22	21	43	16
1940–41	40	18	15	33	2
1941–42	35	14	15	29	8
1945–46	50	22	12	34	2
1946–47	60	24	28	52	12
Bobby Bauer
1937–38	48	20	14	34	9
1938–39	48	13	18	31	4
1939–40	48	17	26	43	2
1940–41	48	17	22	39	2
1941–42	36	13	22	35	11
1945–46	39	11	10	21	4
1946–47	58	30	24	54	4

== See also ==
- Line (ice hockey)
- List of ice hockey linemates
