= Punch line (ice hockey) =

Montreal Canadiens scoring trio

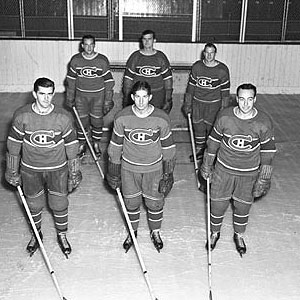
Punch line: Maurice Richard (bottom left), Elmer Lach (bottom centre) and Toe Blake (bottom right)

The Punch line was a famous ice hockey line for the Montreal Canadiens in the 1940s. It consisted of Elmer Lach at center, Toe Blake on left wing, and Maurice Richard on the right side.

During their time together, they led the Canadiens to two Stanley Cup victories. During the 1944–45 NHL season, the three finished first (Lach), second (Richard), and third (Blake) in scoring for the league. They would also form the forward line for the first all-star team in that same season. Richard would be the first team all-star right wing for all but one year while with Blake and Lach.

== History ==
In the 1943–44 season, Montreal head coach Dick Irvin tried a line combination of Lach at centre, Maurice Richard on the right wing, and Toe Blake at left. This line became known as the Punch Line and dominated the NHL for four seasons. Blake was fluently bilingual in English and French, while Richard only spoke French at the time and Lach only spoke English.

In the first season of the Punch line, Lach played 48 games, scoring on average an assist per game; he also added 24 goals. At the conclusion of the season, Lach was named to the second All-Star team. He also won his first Stanley Cup, helping sweep the Chicago Black Hawks in the Stanley Cup Finals.

In the 1944–45 season, Lach played in all 50 games, picking up a league-leading 80 points, of which 26 were goals and 54 were assists. That season, linemate Maurice Richard became the first player in the NHL to score 50 goals in 50 games. That season, the Punch line amassed 220 points in total, an NHL record until the 1960s. Lach was presented the Hart Memorial Trophy as the league's Most Valuable Player, and was named to the first All-Star team, with Blake and Richard joining him.

After being eliminated by the Toronto Maple Leafs in the semi-finals in the previous season, Lach and the Canadiens won another Stanley Cup in the 1945–46 season. Lach led all players with 34 regular season assists, and was named once more to the second All-Star team. In the 1947–48 season, Lach became the first recipient of the Art Ross Trophy, after leading the league in points, with 61. The Punch line ceased to exist after Blake retired at the end of the season. All three members have been in the Hockey Hall of Fame since 1966, when Blake and Lach joined Richard, an inductee five years prior (1961). Blake would retire after the 1947–48 NHL season, but would later coach Richard on the famed Canadiens teams of the late 1950s that won five Stanley Cups in a row. Lach and Richard would later both set the record for most points in a career. Blake also was the Canadiens' coach for eight of the record eleven Cups won by Maurice Richard's younger brother, Henri.

== See also ==
- List of ice hockey line nicknames
