= 100 Greatest NHL Players =

NHL players list

External media

Images
- 100 Greatest NHL Players, NHL.com

Video
- 100 Greatest NHL Players, NHL.com

In 2017, the National Hockey League commemorated its 100th anniversary with a list of the 100 Greatest NHL Players. The list was made through voting compiled by a panel of 58 people, including media members, NHL alumni and NHL executives. The list is in alphabetical order rather than ranked.

The first 33, representing players who started NHL play anytime from 1917 to 1966, were unveiled during a pre-game ceremony at the NHL Centennial Classic outdoor game on January 1, 2017. The remaining players, who started their NHL careers during the second 50 years, were announced on January 27, 2017, at a special NHL 100 Gala ceremony held at the Microsoft Theater in Los Angeles, two days before the 2017 NHL All-Star Game.

== Summary ==
Of the players on the list, 39 are centremen, 21 are defencemen, 15 are goaltenders, 15 are right wingers and 10 are left wingers. There are 21 players who started their NHL career in the decade of the 1980s, and 22 who last played in the NHL during the decade of the 2000s, the most by decade for each category. The player on the list with the shortest NHL career is goaltender Bill Durnan, who played for seven seasons – winning the Vezina Trophy and selected to the NHL First All-Star team in six of his seasons before suffering what would be a career-ending injury. The two players on the list with the longest NHL career, at 26 seasons each, are right winger Gordie Howe and defenceman Chris Chelios. At the time of the list's publication, six players on it were still active in the NHL (Jaromir Jagr, Duncan Keith, Alexander Ovechkin, Sidney Crosby, Jonathan Toews and Patrick Kane).

== Reaction ==
The inclusion of Duncan Keith, Jonathan Toews and Patrick Kane, all of them then-active players and three-time Stanley Cup champions, was considered controversial. Evgeni Malkin, Ed Belfour, Dale Hawerchuk, Joe Thornton, Jarome Iginla, Zdeno Chara, Pierre Pilote and Michel Goulet were considered to be notable players omitted from the list. Malkin responded to his omission by joking that he could be the 101st best player, and remarked that all who were featured on the list earned the honour.

== See also ==
- The Top 100 NHL Players of All Time – a 1998 book created by The Hockey News
