= History of the Detroit Red Wings =

The history of the Detroit Red Wings begins in 1926, when the franchise began play in the National Hockey League (NHL). The professional ice hockey club was founded as the Detroit Cougars on September 25, 1926, one of three teams to join the NHL in 1926. With the demise of the Western Canada Hockey League (WCHL), the rights to the players of the Victoria Cougars were purchased by a Detroit group led by Charles A. Hughes who kept the name "Cougars" for their NHL club. The new team struggled financially; in 1930, the Cougars changed their name to the Detroit Falcons, and after being bought out of receivership by James E. Norris were renamed as the Detroit Red Wings in 1932. The team played their first game on November 18, 1926, and won their first two Stanley Cup titles in 1936 and 1937. The Red Wings have won the Cup eleven times, more than any other American team in NHL history.

The franchise played their first season's home games in Windsor, Ontario, at the Border Cities Arena. The Detroit Olympia opened in 1927 and served as the team's home arena until the midpoint of the 1979–80 season when the Wings moved into Joe Louis Arena. "The Joe", as it is known, had been their home arena until the end of the 2016-17 season. Starting in the 2017-18 season the Wings moved into Little Caesars Arena. The team, led by head coach and general manager Jack Adams, found success throughout the 1930s, 40s, and 50s, making 14 appearances in the finals and winning the Stanley Cup seven times. Led on the ice by the Production Line of Gordie Howe, Ted Lindsay, and Sid Abel (later replaced by Alex Delvecchio), along with goaltenders Harry Lumley and then Terry Sawchuk, the Wings appeared in the finals six times from 1948 through 1955, winning the Cup in 1950, 1952, 1954, and 1955.

After Adams was fired in 1923 the team reached the finals three more times prior to the 1967 NHL expansion, however they qualified for the playoffs only twice in the next 16 years until being purchased by Mike Ilitch in 1982. Ilitch revitalized the club, hiring Jim Devellano to manage the team; one of Devellano's first actions was to draft Steve Yzerman in the 1983 NHL entry draft. Yzerman went on stay with the team for his entire 22-year NHL career, 19 as team captain, winning the Stanley Cup three times as a player and once as an executive. With Ilitch as owner the Wings won the Cup in 1997, 1998, 2002, and 2008.

Fifty-eight Red Wings players and 14 builders have been inducted into the Hockey Hall of Fame. The Lester Patrick Trophy has been presented to 24 former or current Wings and the club has retired the numbers of seven players.

== Founding ==
At the April 18, 1926, NHL meetings to discuss expansion of the NHL, five applications were received from Detroit along with three from Chicago, one from Cleveland, one from New Jersey, one from Hamilton and one from New York. The New York application by Madison Square Garden was approved, allowing the Garden to create the New York Rangers. The NHL decided to investigate all applicants before deciding at their next meeting. At the time, it was known that the Western Canada Hockey League was folding. Other than the Rangers, there was opposition to adding any other teams to the NHL. The NHL constitution required unanimous approval on adding new teams and the New York Americans were opposed to the plan to add one team in Detroit and one in Chicago, as the Americans favoured two teams in Chicago. This was overcome at the May 2, 1926, NHL meeting by amending the NHL constitution, which required only a 2/3 approval, to allow a simple majority vote for the approval of new teams and it became expected that Chicago and Detroit would receive franchises. At the meeting, what were now two competing syndicates vying for the Detroit franchise, one from Townsend and McCreath, and one from Bierer, were ordered to amalgamate by the NHL.

The next day, May 3, it was announced by Detroit promoters Morris Caplan and Morris Friedberg that they had purchased the 1925 Stanley Cup champion Victoria Cougars in expectation of an NHL franchise being awarded to them at NHL meetings later that month. Similarly, the Portland Rosebuds were also purchased that day by Chicago interests. On May 15, 1926, Detroit was tentatively awarded an NHL expansion team to a group of investors led by Townsend, Seyburn and McCreath, not Caplan and Friedberg, on condition of the arena being ready for the upcoming season. At the time, the arena was expected to be ready for December 1. The Victoria Club was sold by Lester and Frank Patrick to the Townsend group for $100,000, of which $25,000 went to Caplan and Friedberg. Although the arena was not ready, the franchise was permanently approved by the NHL on September 25, 1926. The franchise was established as the Detroit Cougars, retaining the Victoria name. However, the NHL does not consider the Red Wings to be a continuation of the Victoria team. The Rangers had been issued a franchise on May 15, while the Chicago Black Hawks joined the league the same day as the Cougars; the additions of these clubs increased the number of teams in the league to ten.^{[a]}

== Early seasons (1926–1942) ==
=== 1926–1932: Cougars and Falcons ===
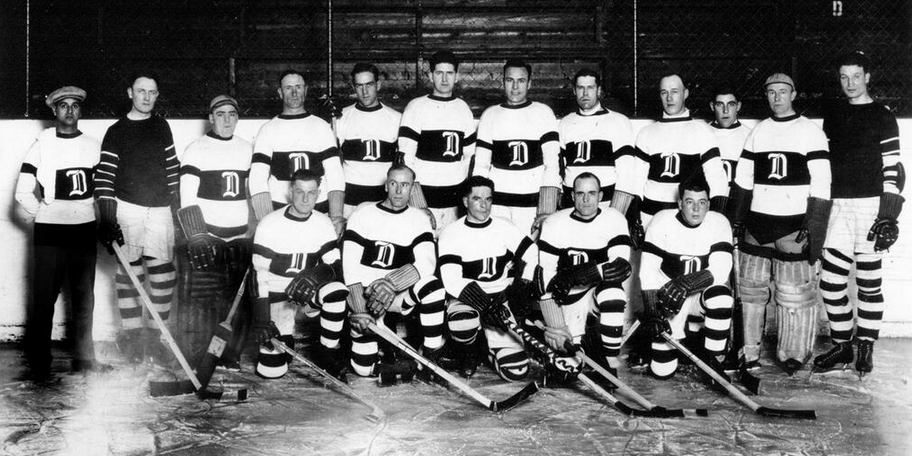
Team photo from Detroit's inaugural season. The franchise was known as the Detroit Cougars from 1926 to 1930.

Without a Detroit arena, the new Cougars played their first season in Windsor, Ontario, at the Border Cities Arena. Frank Patrick of Victoria did not come east to manage Detroit. The Cougars signed former Calgary Tigers player Art Duncan to play and coach the team, but the NHL, in its distribution of WHL players ordered Detroit to send players Art Gagne and Gord Fraser to the Chicago Black Hawks for Duncan. The Cougars played their first game on November 18, 1926, losing 2–0 to the Boston Bruins, and finished their first season with a record of 12 wins, 28 losses and 4 ties for 28 points, the worst record in the league; the 12 wins and 4 ties remain club records for fewest wins and fewest ties in a season.

The next year, the 1927–28 season, the team moved into the Detroit Olympia, playing their first game on November 22, 1927. This building would be the home arena for the team until 1979. Also in that year, Duncan was traded to the Toronto Maple Leafs. He was replaced as coach and general manager by Jack Adams, recently retired from the Ottawa Senators. Adams would be the face of the franchise for the next 36 years as coach or general manager. The Cougars finished with a record of 19-19-6, moving up to fourth place in the American division.

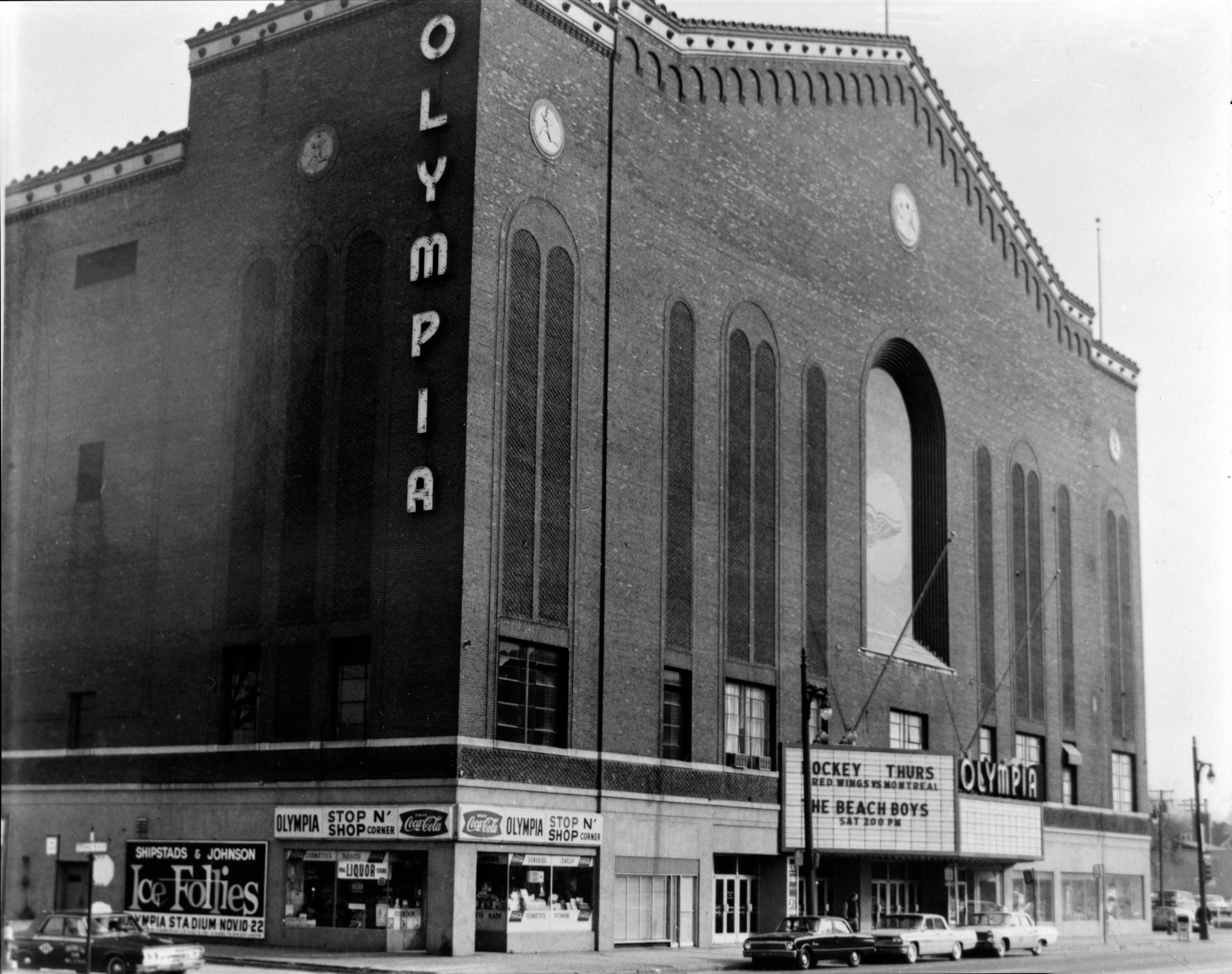
The team moved into its first permanent home, the Detroit Olympia, in 1927.

The Cougars made the Stanley Cup playoffs for the first time in 1929 with Carson Cooper leading the team in scoring. The Cougars were outscored 7–2 in the two-game series with Toronto.

In 1930 the team changed its name to the Detroit Falcons as a result of a promotion with a newspaper. They would reach the NHL playoffs for the first time in 1929, losing the series to the Toronto Maple Leafs. However, the team continued to have financial difficulties, and was forced into receivership in 1931.

=== 1932–1942: The new Detroit Red Wings ===
Chicago grain merchant James E. Norris bought the team in 1932. His first act was to change the team's name to the Red Wings. He also designed a new logo with a wing protruding from a wheel, more or less the same logo that is used today. Norris believed the logo would help the team curry favor with Detroit's auto industry. He also wanted to pay homage to a hockey team for whom he had played earlier in the century, the Montreal Hockey Club—nicknamed the Winged Wheelers.

Under the new name Red Wings, the team began to improve. Carl Voss was named the inaugural recipient of the NHL rookie-of-the-year award in 1932–33. The team as a whole also began to enjoy success. They reached the 1934 Stanley Cup Finals, losing to the Chicago Black Hawks.

In 1935–36 the Red Wings won the Stanley Cup for the first time, defeating the Toronto Maple Leafs. En route to the final, they played in the longest overtime game in NHL history, winning the first game of a semi-final match against the Montreal Maroons in the sixth overtime frame. The match lasted 176 minutes and 30 seconds of game time, ending when rookie Mud Bruneteau scored, giving Detroit a 1–0 win. The following season, they defeated the New York Rangers for their second consecutive Stanley Cup title.

In 1938, the Wings and the Montreal Canadiens became the first NHL teams to play in Europe, visiting Paris and London. The Wings played nine games against the Canadiens and went 3-5-1. The Wings did not play in Europe again until the preseason and start of the 2009-10 NHL season in Sweden against the St. Louis Blues.

== Original Six era (1942–1967) ==
=== 1940s ===
They made the Stanley Cup Finals in three consecutive years during the early 1940s — swept by the Boston Bruins in 1941, reverse swept by Toronto in 1942, and winning their third Cup sweeping the Bruins in 1943, with Syd Howe and Mud Bruneteau scoring 20 goals apiece. They remained a solid team through the rest of the decade, making the playoffs every year, and reaching the finals three more times.

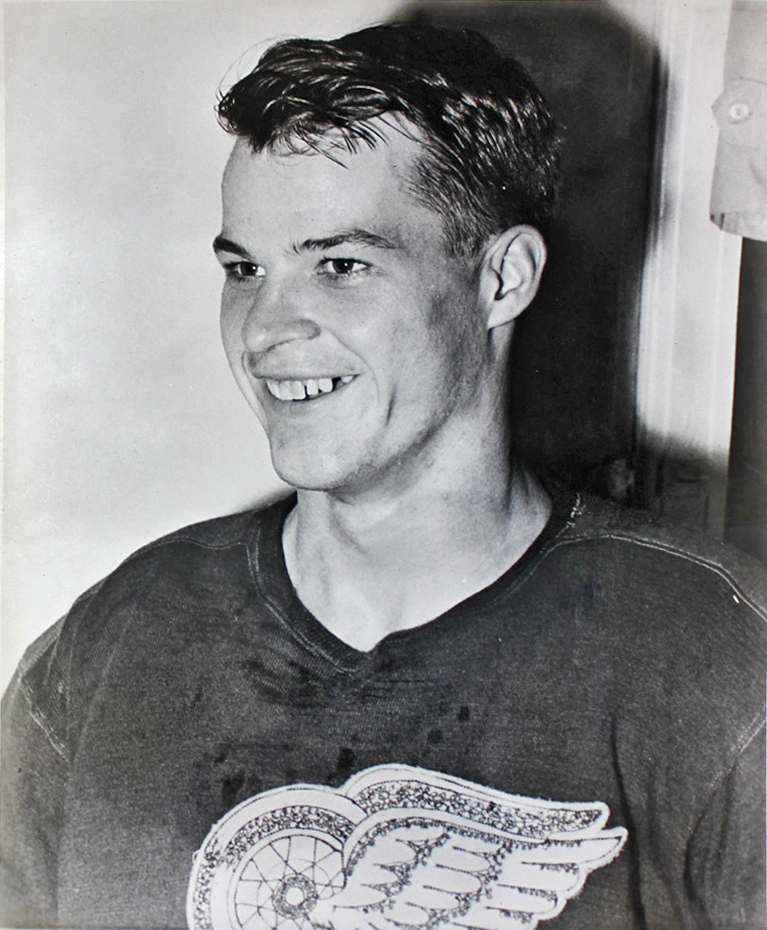
Gordie Howe made his debut with the Red Wings in the 1946–47 season.

In 1946, one of the greatest players in hockey history came into the NHL with the Red Wings. Gordie Howe, a right-winger from Floral, Saskatchewan, only scored seven goals and 15 assists in his first season and would not reach his prime for a few more years. It was also the last season as head coach for Adams, who stepped down after the season to concentrate on his duties as general manager. He was succeeded by minor league coach Tommy Ivan.

By his second season, Howe was paired with Sid Abel and Ted Lindsay to form what would become one of the great lines in NHL history—the "Production Line". Lindsay's 33 goals propelled the Wings to the Stanley Cup Finals, where they were swept by the Maple Leafs. Detroit reached the Finals again the following season, only to be swept again by Toronto.

=== 1950–1966: The Gordie Howe era ===
The Wings returned to the top in 1950, with Pete Babando scoring the game winner in double overtime of Game 7 to beat the Rangers in the Finals. After the game, Lindsay skated around the Olympia ice with the Cup, beginning a tradition that continues today.

After being upset by Montreal in the 1951 semifinals, Detroit won its fifth Cup in 1952, sweeping both the Leafs and the Canadiens, with the Production Line of Howe, Abel and Lindsay joined by second-year goalie Terry Sawchuk. Detroit would become the first team in 17 years to go undefeated in the playoffs. They also scored an amazing 24 playoff goals, compared to Toronto and Montreal's combined total of 5. Abel left the Wings for Chicago following the season, and Alex Delvecchio took his spot on the roster.

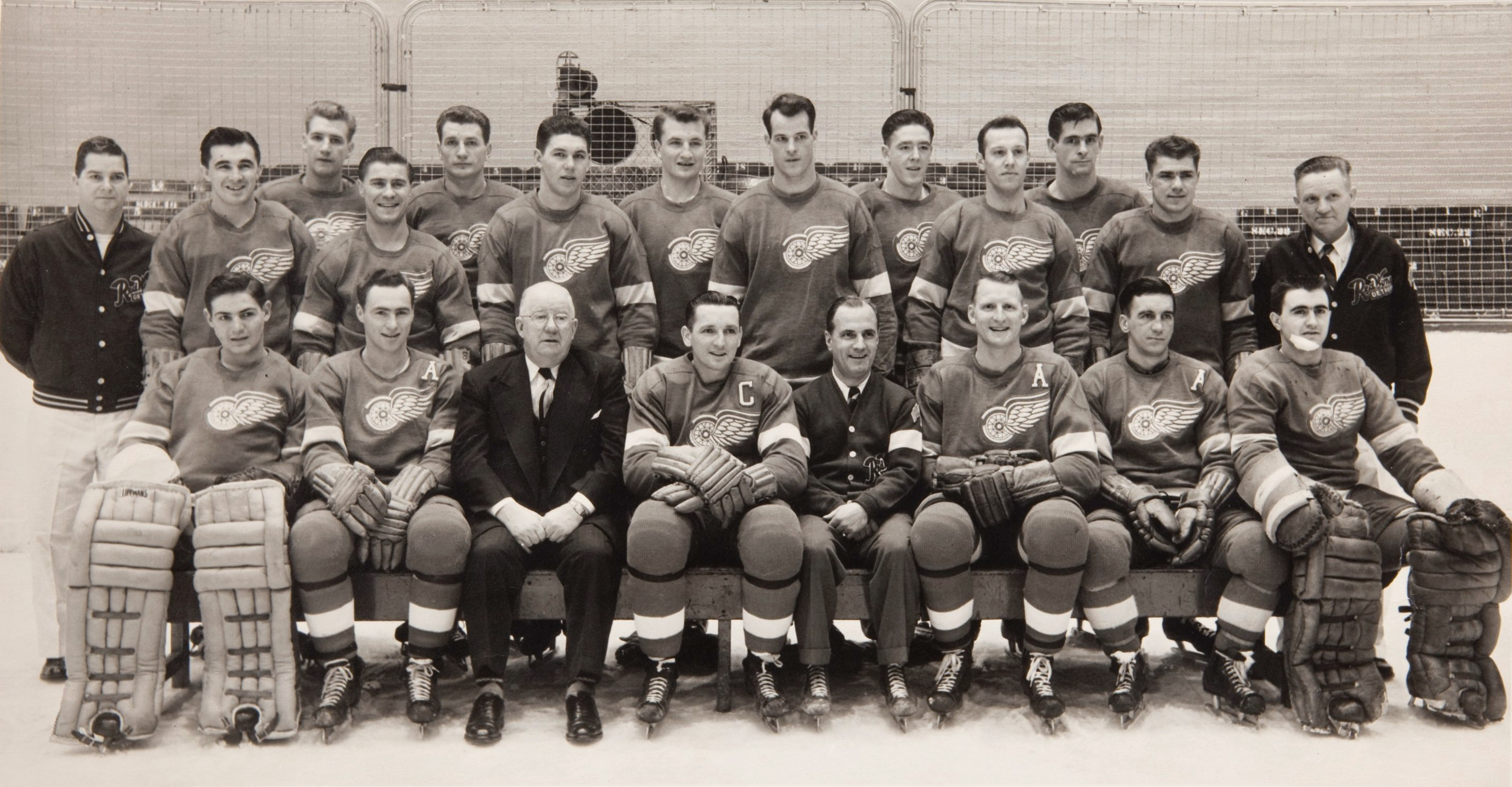
Team photo of the 1951–52 Red Wings. The Red Wings won their fifth Stanley Cup that season.

James E. Norris died in December 1952. He was succeeded as team president by his daughter, Marguerite – the first (and as of the 2017–18 season, only) woman to head an NHL franchise. She made no secret of her dislike for Adams. While she could have summarily fired him, since he was still without a contract, she chose not to do so.

Following another playoff upset in 1953 at the hands of the Bruins, the Red Wings won back to back Stanley Cups in 1954 (over Montreal, when Habs defenseman Doug Harvey redirected a Tony Leswick shot into his own net) and 1955 (also over Montreal in the full seven games). The 1954–55 season ended a run of seven straight regular season titles, an NHL record.

Also during the 1955 off-season, Marguerite Norris lost an intrafamily power struggle, and was forced to turn the Wings over to younger brother Bruce, who had inherited his father's grain business. Detroit and Montreal met once again in the 1956 finals, but this time the Canadiens won the Cup, their first of five in a row.

In 1957 Ted Lindsay, who scored 30 goals and led the league in assists with 55, teamed up with Harvey to help start the National Hockey League Players' Association (NHLPA). As a result, he, along with outspoken young netminder Glenn Hall, was promptly traded to Chicago (which was owned by James D. Norris, Bruce's elder brother) after his most productive year. The Wings had lost in the first round of the playoffs to the Bruins.

The Lindsay deal was one of several questionable trades made by Adams in the late 1950s. For example, in 1955, he had traded Sawchuk to Boston in order to make room for Glenn Hall. While Adams managed to get Sawchuk back two years later, it came at the expense of sending up-and-coming Johnny Bucyk to Boston. It was one of the most one-sided trades in hockey history. Although Sawchuk played seven more years for Detroit (and would stay in the NHL for another five years), his best days had passed. Meanwhile, Bucyk went on to play 21 more years with the Bruins and score over 500 goals en route to the Hall of Fame. In 1958 the Red Wings were swept in the first round by Montreal; in 1959 they missed the playoffs for the first time in 21 years.

Within a couple of years, however, Detroit was rejuvenated and made the Finals for four of the next six years between 1961 and 1966. Still, despite having Howe, Delvecchio, Norm Ullman, and Parker MacDonald as consistent goal-scorers, Lindsay's sudden one-year comeback in 1964–65, and Sawchuk and later Roger Crozier between the pipes, the Wings came away empty-handed. Adams was fired as general manager in 1963. He had coached for 15 years and served as general manager for 31 years on a handshake, and his 36–year tenure is still the longest for any general manager in NHL history.

== Expansion era (1967–1993) ==
=== 1967–1982: The "Dead Wings" era ===
Only a year after making the Finals, the Red Wings finished a distant fifth, 24 points out of the playoffs. It was the beginning of a slump from which they would not emerge for almost 20 years. Between 1967 and 1983, Detroit only made the playoffs twice, winning one series. From 1968 to 1982, the Wings had 14 head coaches (not counting interim coaches), with none lasting more than three seasons. In contrast, their first six full-time coaches – Art Duncan, Adams, Ivan, Jimmy Skinner, and Abel – had covered a 42–year period. During this dark era in franchise history, the team was derisively known as the "Dead Wings" or "Dead Things".

One factor was the end of the old "development" system, which allowed Adams to get young prospects to commit to playing for Detroit as early as their 16th birthday. Another factor was Ned Harkness, who was hired as coach in 1970 and was promoted to general manager midway through the season. A successful college hockey coach, Harkness tried to force his two-way style of play on a veteran Red Wings team resistant to change. The Wings chafed under his discipline, in which he demanded short hair and no smoking, along with new rules regarding drinking and phone calls. Harkness was forced to resign in 1973.

In the "expansion season" of 1967–68, the Red Wings also acquired longtime star left-winger Frank Mahovlich from the defending Cup champs in Toronto. Mahovlich would go on a line with Howe and Delvecchio, and in 1968–69, he scored a career-high 49 goals and had two All-Star seasons in Detroit.

However, this could not last. Mahovlich was traded to Montreal in 1970, and Howe retired after the 1970–71 season. Howe returned to pro hockey shortly after to play with his two sons Mark and Marty Howe (Mark would later join the Red Wings at the end of his career) in the upstart World Hockey Association (WHA) in 1972. Through the decade, with Mickey Redmond having two 50–goal seasons and Marcel Dionne starting to reach his prime (which he did not attain until he was traded to the Los Angeles Kings in 1975), a lack of defensive and goaltending ability continually hampered the Wings.

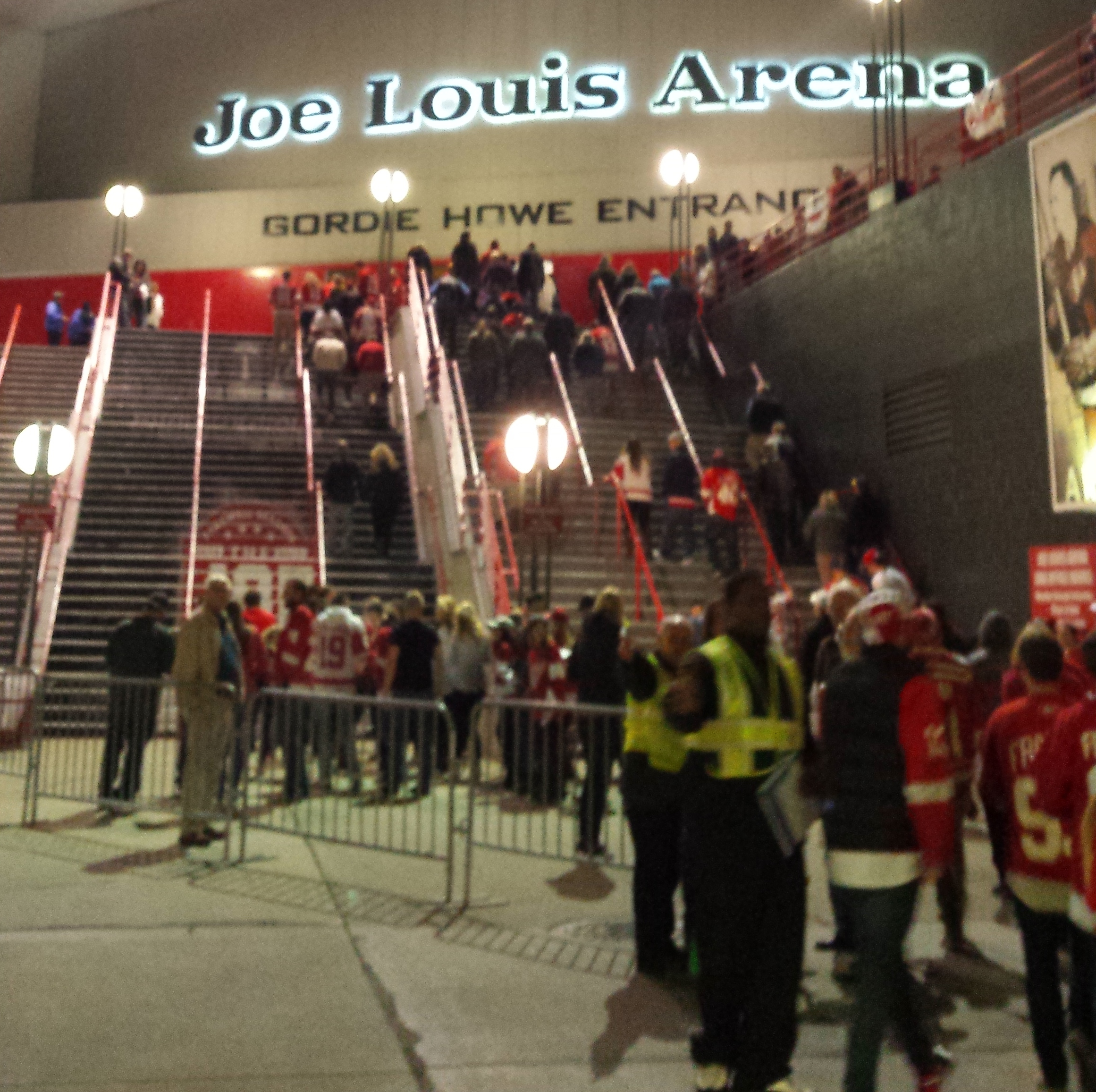
Joe Louis Arena in 2006. The Red Wings moved into the arena to begin the 1979–80 season.

Around the same time, the area around the Olympia went to seed. After two murders took place near the arena, Norris seriously considered moving to an arena in suburban Pontiac. However, the city offered the Red Wings a deal Norris couldn't refuse—operational control of a new city-owned arena on the banks of the Detroit River, Joe Louis Arena. The Red Wings moved to the new arena during the 1979–80 season.

In 1982, after 50 years of family ownership, Bruce Norris sold the Red Wings to Mike Ilitch, founder of Little Caesars Pizza.

=== 1983–1993: The Yzerman era begins ===
In 1983 the Wings drafted Steve Yzerman, a center from Cranbrook, British Columbia. He led the team in scoring in his rookie year, and started the Wings' climb back to the top. That season, with John Ogrodnick scoring 42 times and Ivan Boldirev and Ron Duguay also with 30–goal seasons, Detroit made the playoffs for the first time in six years. Defenseman Brad Park, acquired from the Boston Bruins in the 1983 free-agent market, also helped the Wings reach the postseason and ended up winning the Bill Masterton Memorial Trophy the same season.

Later, Park was asked to coach the Wings, but was sacked after 45 games in 1985–86. He admitted, "I took over a last-place team, and I kept them there." They did indeed end up in the basement, achieving a 17–57–6 record for only 40 points. This was the same year that the Wings added enforcer Bob Probert, one of the most familiar faces of the Wings in the 1980s and 1990s.

By 1987, with Yzerman joined by Petr Klima, Adam Oates, Gerard Gallant, defenceman Darren Veitch and new head coach Jacques Demers, the Wings won a playoff series for only the second time in the modern era. They made it all the way to the conference finals against the powerful and eventual Stanley Cup champion Edmonton Oilers, but lost in five games. In 1988 they won their first division title in 23 years (since 1964–65, when they finished first in a one-division league). They did so, however, in a relatively weak division; no other team in the Norris finished above .500. As was the case in the previous season, they made it to the conference finals only to lose again to the eventual cup champion Oilers in five games.

In 1989, Yzerman scored a career-best 65 goals, but Detroit was upset in the first round by the Chicago Blackhawks. The following season Yzerman scored 62 goals, but the team missed the playoffs. Rumors spread that maybe "Stevie Wonder" should be traded.

But it was Demers, not Yzerman, who received the pink slip. New coach Bryan Murray was unable to get them back over .500, but they returned to the playoffs. Yzerman was joined by Sergei Fedorov, who would be an award-winner and frequent all-star for the team in the 1990s. In 1992, the team acquired Ray Sheppard, who had a career-best 52 goals two years later; and in '93, top defenseman Paul Coffey. Also joining the Red Wings around this time were draft picks like Slava Kozlov, Darren McCarty, Vladimir Konstantinov and Nicklas Lidstrom.

== Modern era (1994–present) ==
=== 1994–2004: The Russian Five and return to glory ===
The Yzerman trade rumors ended very soon after Scotty Bowman got behind the Motown bench in 1993. In his second season, the lockout-shortened 1994–95 season, he guided Detroit to its first Finals appearance in 29 years, only to be swept by the New Jersey Devils.

The Wings kept adding more star power, picking up Slava Fetisov, Igor Larionov and goaltender Mike Vernon in trades and winning an NHL record 62 games in 1996. After defeating the St. Louis Blues (with a Game 7, double-overtime goal by Yzerman), the Wings would fall in the Western Conference Finals to the eventual champion Colorado Avalanche (formerly Quebec Nordiques).

The following year, Detroit, joined by Brendan Shanahan and Larry Murphy during the season, once again reached the Finals in 1997. After defeating the St. Louis Blues in six games, the Mighty Ducks of Anaheim and the Colorado Avalanche in the first three rounds, the Wings went on to beat the Philadelphia Flyers in four straight games in the Stanley Cup Finals. It was the Wings' first Stanley Cup since 1955, breaking the longest drought (42 years long) in the league at that time. Mike Vernon accepted the Conn Smythe Trophy as the Most Valuable Player in the 1997 playoffs.

Tragedy struck the Wings six days after their championship; defenseman Vladimir Konstantinov, one of the "Russian Five," suffered a brain injury in a limousine accident, and his career came to an abrupt end. Wings trainer Sergei Mnatsakanov suffered similar injuries. Red Wings defenseman Slava Fetisov was also injured in the accident, but was released from the hospital the next day. The Red Wings dedicated the 1997–98 season, which also ended in a Stanley Cup victory (another sweep, this time over the Washington Capitals), to Konstantinov, who came out onto the ice in his wheelchair on victory night to touch the Cup. Yzerman, who had won the Conn Smythe Trophy as post-season Most Valuable Player that year, immediately gave the Cup to Konstantinov after he hoisted it. He later reported that he had intended to pass it to goalie Chris Osgood for his stellar surprise performance. "Not very often does a moment in hockey transcend sports," remarked Brendan Shanahan later.

The following season, the Wings looked poised to "three-peat" for the first time in franchise history, acquiring three-time top blueliner Chris Chelios from his hometown Chicago Blackhawks in March 1999, but it was not to be as they would end up losing the Western Conference Semifinals to Colorado in six games.

The Wings had built up a fierce rivalry with the Avalanche in this time. With the Red Wings beating the Avs in the third round in 1997, and Colorado beating Detroit in the second round in both 1999 and 2000, the battles between these two teams had become one of the fiercest in sports. During a game on March 26, 1997, a brawl ensued between Colorado goalie Patrick Roy and his Detroit counterpart Mike Vernon. In a separate fight, Darren McCarty paid back Avalanche player Claude Lemieux for his hit from behind on Kris Draper the year before. Fittingly, it was Darren McCarty who scored the overtime goal to give the Red Wings the 6–5 victory in the game that became known as "Fight Night at the Joe."

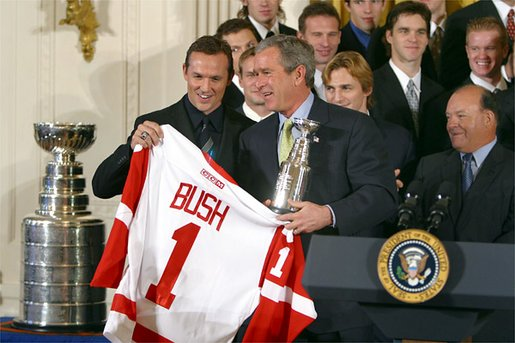
George W. Bush receives a jersey from Red Wings captain Steve Yzerman, during the welcome reception at the White House for the 2002 Stanley Cup champions.

In 2001, Detroit, the league's second-best team in the regular season, were upset in the playoffs by the Los Angeles Kings. During the summer that followed, they acquired legendary goalie Dominik Hasek (the defending Vezina Trophy winner) in a trade with the Buffalo Sabres. They also landed left-wing Luc Robitaille and right-wing Brett Hull through free agency. Rookie center Pavel Datsyuk joined the Wings from the Russian Superleague the same year. The Wings became the hands-down favorite to win the Cup in 2002. They did not disappoint, posting the league's best record in the regular season and defeating Colorado in seven games in the Western Conference Finals after beating the Vancouver Canucks and St. Louis Blues in rounds one and two. The Red Wings went on to capture another Cup in five games over the Cinderella-story Carolina Hurricanes, with Nicklas Lidstrom winning the Conn Smythe Trophy as the playoff's Most Valuable Player. Bowman and Hasek both elected to retire after the season. Yzerman, Hull, and Robitaille were inducted into the Hockey Hall of Fame in 2009.

The 2002–03 season saw the Red Wings promote associate coach Dave Lewis to the head coach position after Bowman's retirement. Needing a new starting goaltender after Hasek's retirement, the Red wings signed Curtis Joseph from the Toronto Maple Leafs to a three-year, $24 million deal. Also new to the lineup was highly touted Swedish prospect Henrik Zetterberg. The Red Wings finished the season second in the Western Conference and third overall in the NHL. The Red Wings were favored in their first round matchup against the 7th seeded Mighty Ducks of Anaheim. But the Ducks shocked the hockey world by sweeping the Red Wings in four games, thanks in large part to the strong performance of Ducks goaltender J. S. Giguere. The Ducks later advanced to the Stanley Cup Finals, where they lost in Game 7 to the New Jersey Devils.

Longtime Wing Sergei Fedorov signed with the Mighty Ducks as a free agent during the offseason, after a long contract dispute. More importantly, Dominik Hasek decided to come out of retirement, and joined the Wings for the 2003–04 season. The Wings also added defenseman Derian Hatcher from the Dallas Stars via free agency, as well as forward Ray Whitney from the Columbus Blue Jackets. Joseph, despite being one of the highest-paid players in the NHL, had to spend part of the season with the Grand Rapids Griffins, Detroit's American Hockey League affiliate. The Wings attempted to trade him; but, perhaps because of his large contract, there were no suitors. Ultimately, Hasek called it quits after just 14 games because of a groin injury, and Joseph became the Wings' No. 1 goalie again, and helped lead the team to the top of the Central Division and the National Hockey League standings. Hatcher was also injured just a few games into the regular season with a torn MCL. Hatcher would not return until the end of the regular season. The Wings acquired veteran center Robert Lang from the Capitals at the trade deadline.

The Red Wings eliminated the Nashville Predators in six games in the first round of the playoffs, which led to a second round matchup with the Calgary Flames. In Game 5, with the series tied at two games apiece, a deflected puck struck Steve Yzerman in the left eye, sidelining him for the remainder of the playoffs. The Red Wings lost that game 1–0, and were eliminated the next game in Calgary by the same score in overtime.

During the 2004 offseason, the Wings focused on keeping players they already had instead of being active on the free agent market. They re-signed Frank J. Selke Trophy-winning forward Kris Draper, who had just had a career season, to a four-year deal, and captain Yzerman to a one-year deal. They also re-signed Brendan Shanahan, Jiri Fischer, Jason Williams, and Mathieu Dandenault as well head coach Dave Lewis. Deals were not reached with veteran defensemen Chris Chelios and Mathieu Schneider or star forward Pavel Datsyuk before the NHL owners triggered their lockout on September 15. There also was a parting of ways with veteran forward Brett Hull, who signed with the Phoenix Coyotes as did forward Boyd Devereaux.

=== 2005–2012: Nick Lidstrom and the 'Swedish Connection' era ===
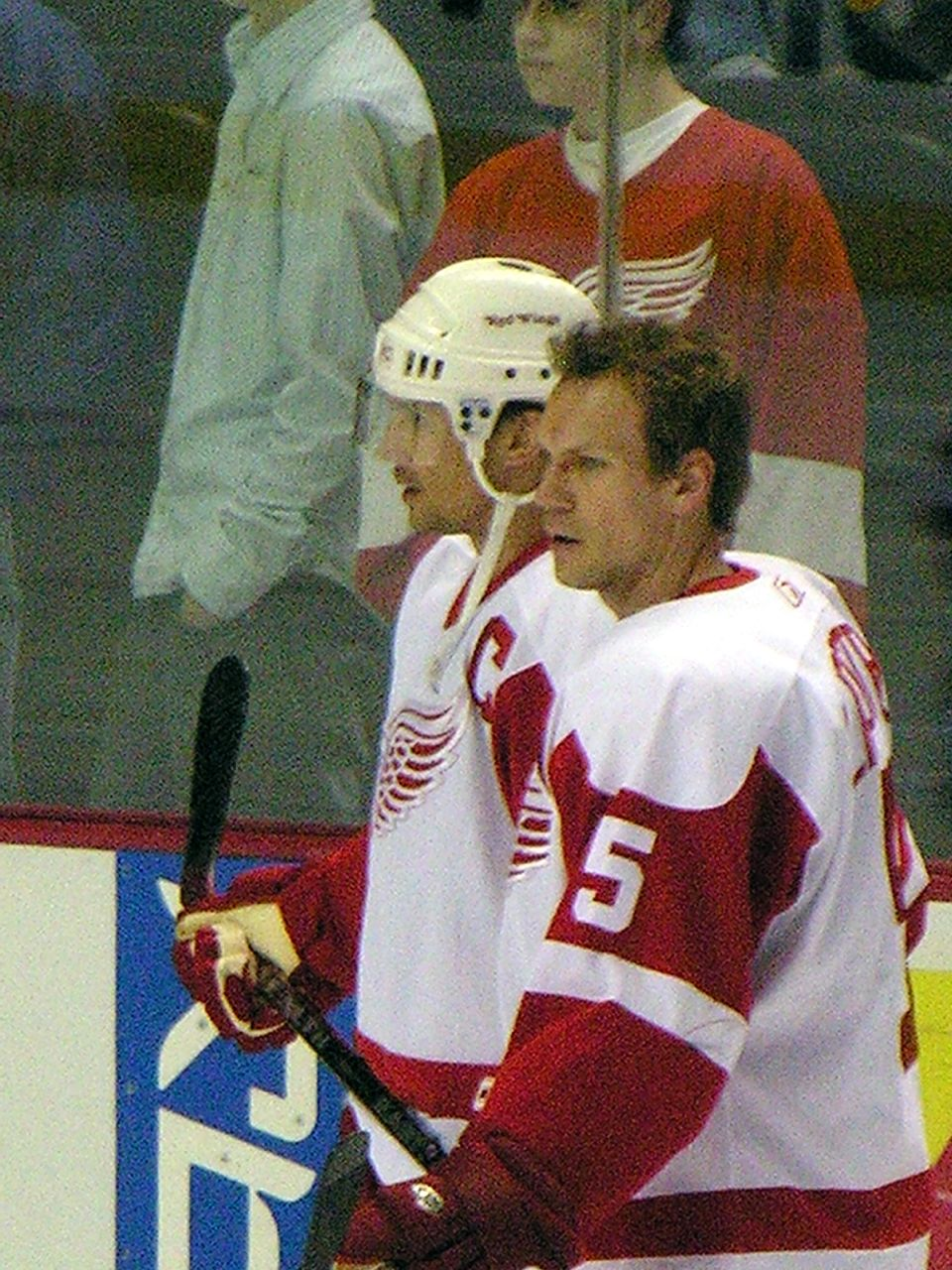
Steve Yzerman with Nicklas Lidstrom during the 2005–06. The season would be Yzerman's last, with Lidstrom succeeding him as the team captain.

On July 15, 2005, Mike Babcock, former head coach in Anaheim, became the new head coach for the Wings. During a November 21, 2005, game against Nashville, defenseman Jiri Fischer suffered a heart arrhythmia and collapsed on the bench. The game was canceled because of his injury, and was made up on January 23, 2006. This was the first time in NHL history a game had been postponed by injury. The game was played for the full 60 minutes; however, the Predators were allowed to maintain their 1–0 lead from the original game and won, 3–2. The Red Wings won the Presidents' Trophy with a 58–16–8 record, earning them 124 points, and secured home ice advantage for the entire playoffs. They opened the 2006 playoffs against the Edmonton Oilers with a 3–2 overtime victory at Joe Louis Arena, but the Oilers won four of the next five games to take the series.

Continuing the shakeup of the Red Wings roster, the off-season saw the departure of Brendan Shanahan and the return of Dominik Hasek, while Steve Yzerman announced his retirement after a 23-season Hall of Fame-caliber career with the Wings, at the time having played the second most games in history all with a single team (behind fellow Red Wing Alex Delvecchio and later also surpassed by Nicklas Lidstrom). Yzerman retired with the additional distinction of having been the longest-serving team captain in NHL history.

The Red Wings opened the 2006–07 season with Nicklas Lidstrom as the new captain. The team retired Steve Yzerman's jersey number 19 on January 2. The Wings finished first in the Western Conference and tied for first in the NHL with the Buffalo Sabres, but the Sabres were awarded the Presidents' Trophy by virtue of having the greater number of wins. Detroit advanced to the third round of the 2007 playoffs after defeating Calgary and the San Jose Sharks both in six games, coming back three-straight after the Sharks' 2–1 series lead. The Red Wings, however, then lost to the eventual Stanley Cup winning team, the Anaheim Ducks, in the Western Conference Finals, four games to two.

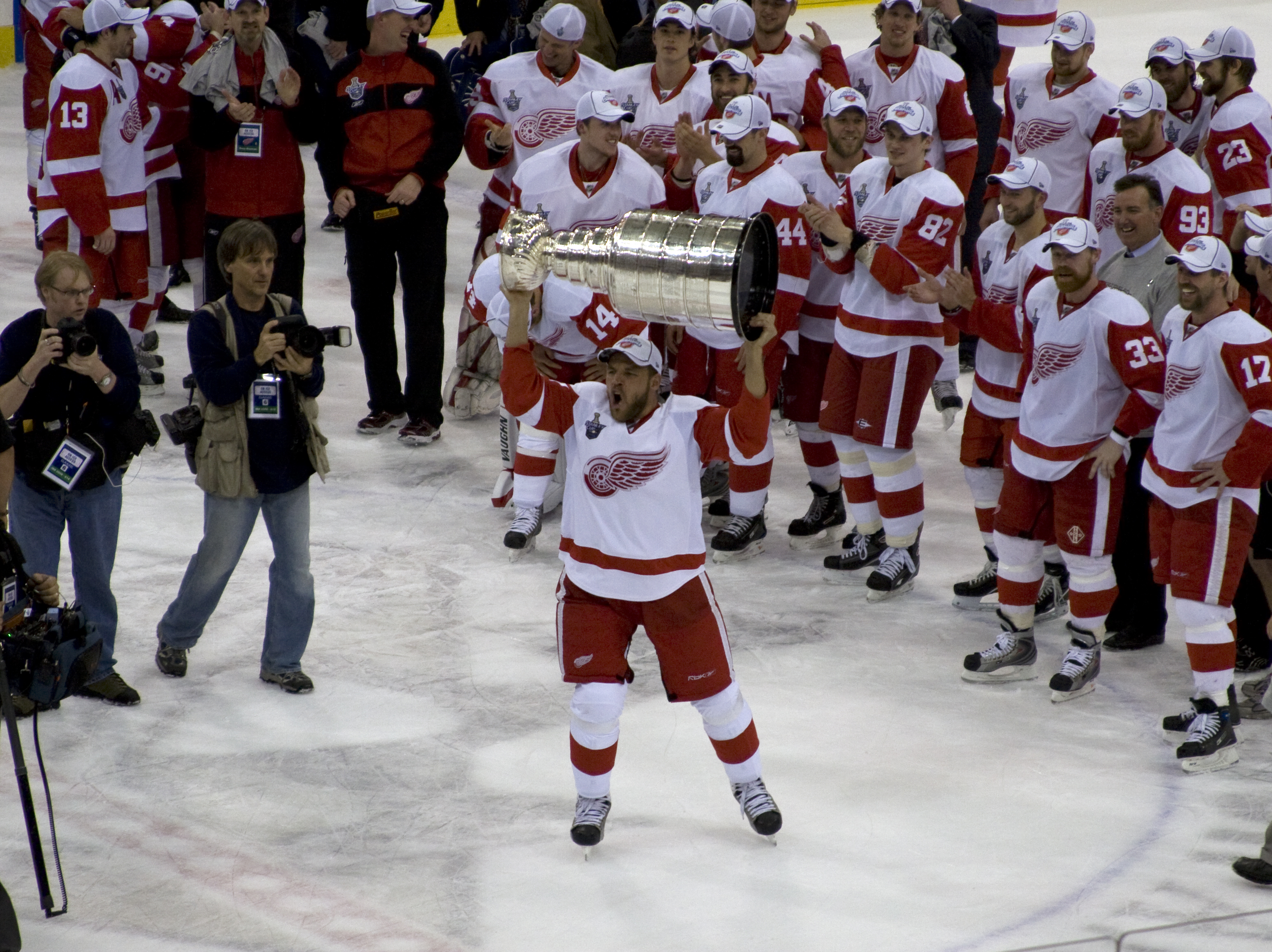
Aaron Downey celebrates after winning the 2008 Stanley Cup Finals.

To start the 2007–08 campaign, Henrik Zetterberg recorded at least a point in each of Detroit's first 16 games, setting a club record. The Wings cruised to the playoffs, where they faced the Nashville Predators. After goalie Dominik Hasek played poorly in Games 3 and 4 of the series, both losses, head coach Mike Babcock replaced him with Chris Osgood. Osgood had departed the Wings earlier in the decade, only to be re-acquired as a backup in 2005. Osgood never left the net for the remainder of the playoffs, as the Red Wings came back in that series on their way to winning their 11th Stanley Cup. The final victory came in Game 6 on June 4, 2008, against the Pittsburgh Penguins, by a score of 3–2. This was the Wings' fourth Stanley Cup in 11 years. Zetterberg scored the winning goal in the decisive game, and was also named the winner of the Conn Smythe Trophy as the Most Valuable Player of the playoffs. It was the first time a team captained by a non-North American player (Nicklas Lidstrom) won the Stanley Cup.

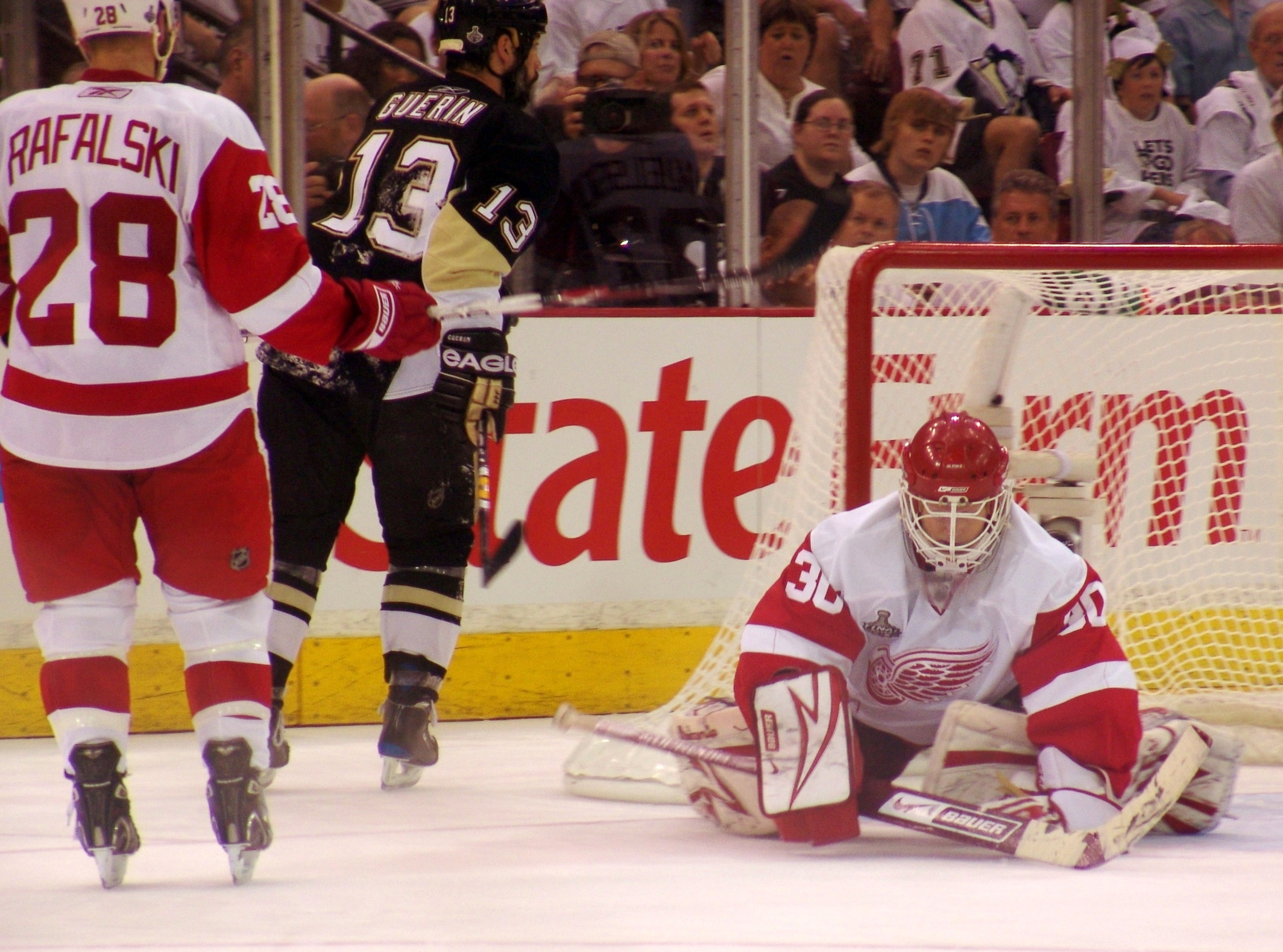
Chris Osgood makes a save against Bill Guerin in the 2009 Stanley Cup Finals.

On July 2, 2008, the Detroit Red Wings announced the signing of Marian Hossa. From the beginning of the 2008–09 season to New Year's Day, the Wings enjoyed success. Although they finished second in the conference to the San Jose Sharks, the Wings became the first team in NHL history to top 100 points in nine straight seasons. On January 1, 2009, the Red Wings played the Chicago Blackhawks in the third NHL Winter Classic at Chicago's Wrigley Field, beating them 6–4. The Wings entered the 2009 playoffs as the second overall seed in the Western Conference. The Red Wings handily swept the Columbus Blue Jackets, then beat the eighth-seeded Anaheim Ducks in a hard-fought seven-game series. They took on the vastly improved Chicago Blackhawks in the Conference Finals, winning in five games. The Red Wings would face the Pittsburgh Penguins in the Finals for a second consecutive year, but this series would feature a different outcome. Pittsburgh defeated the Red Wings in seven games, Detroit becoming only the second NHL team to lose the Cup at home in Game 7.

The Red Wings began the 2009–10 NHL season in Stockholm, Sweden, falling in both games to the St. Louis Blues by scores of 4–3 and 5–3, respectively. They were plagued by injuries throughout the season and lost the second most man-games to injury, with only the last place Edmonton Oilers losing more. The beginning of the season was a struggle for the Wings, with key players out of the lineup including Henrik Zetterberg, Tomas Holmstrom, Johan Franzen, Valtteri Filppula and Niklas Kronwall. After the Olympic break, Detroit posted a record of 13–2–2 and earned 28 points, the most by any team in the NHL in the month of March. This run helped them secure the fifth playoff seed in the Western Conference. Detroit won their first-round playoff series over the Phoenix Coyotes in seven games. In the second round, they fell behind the San Jose Sharks three games to one, before being knocked out of the playoffs in five games. All four games that the Red Wings lost that series were decided by one goal. The lone game that they won ended with a final score of 7–1.

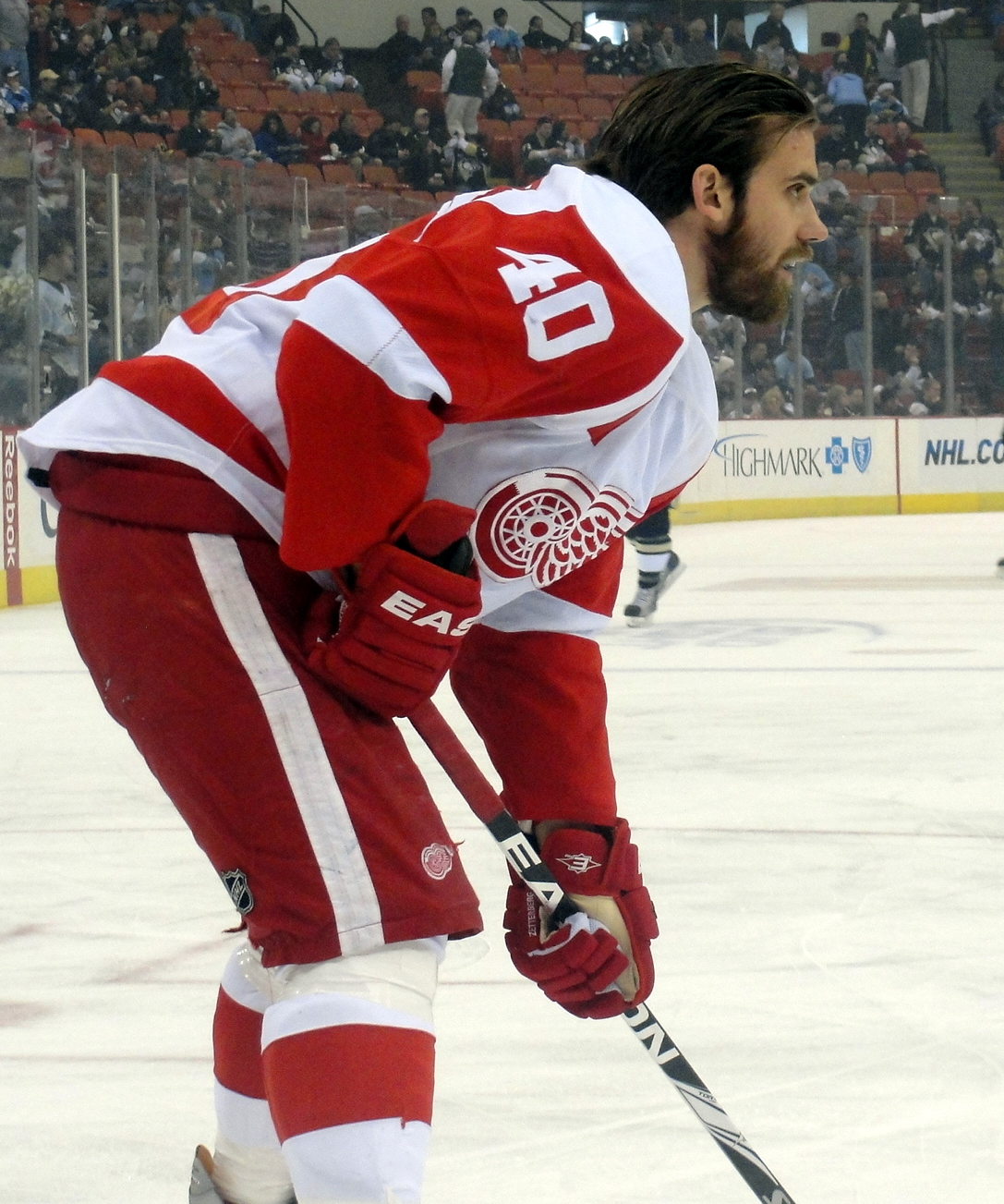
Henrik Zetterberg in January 2010. The Red Wings struggled to begin the 2009-10 season, with key players like Zetterberg injured.

A healthier Red Wings team finished the 2010–11 NHL season with a 47–25–10 record and 104 points to win the Central Division title. They earned the #3 seed in the Western Conference for the Stanley Cup playoffs (extending their professional sports record of post-season appearances to 20 seasons), finishing behind the Vancouver Canucks (117) and San Jose Sharks (105). The Wings again faced the Phoenix Coyotes in the first round of the playoffs, this time sweeping them 4–0—making them the only team in the 2011 playoffs to sweep the first round—and again moved on to play the Sharks in Round 2. After losing the first three games of the series against the Sharks, the Red Wings won three consecutive games to force a Game 7, becoming just the eighth team in NHL history to accomplish the feat (the Chicago Blackhawks became the seventh team to do so earlier in the 2011 playoffs, against Vancouver). The Red Wings lost Game 7 to the Sharks by a score of 3–2, and were eliminated.

During the 2011 off-season, Red Wings defenseman Brian Rafalski retired, citing injuries as the main reason behind his decision. Detroit soon signed free agent defenseman Ian White to take his place. Long-time Red Wings Kris Draper and Chris Osgood also announced their retirement from hockey, with both soon taking positions within the club. Detroit signed goaltender Ty Conklin for his second tour of duty with the team. Tragedy struck the organization and the rest of the National Hockey League upon the 2011 Lokomotiv Yaroslavl plane crash, which claimed the lives of former Red Wings assistant coach Brad McCrimmon and defenseman Ruslan Salei, who had joined the KHL team during the summer. Stefan Liv, a former Red Wings goaltending prospect, was also among the fatalities. The Red Wings then added a patch to the left arm of their uniforms with the trio's initials.

On February 14, 2012, the Red Wings set the NHL record for most consecutive wins at home in a single season by winning their 21st home game with a 3–1 victory over the Dallas Stars, and on Sunday, February 19, 2012, defeated the San Jose Sharks to record their 23rd consecutive home victory, breaking the overall record previously held by the Boston Bruins over two seasons from 1929 to 1930. The Red Wings also made the NHL playoffs extending their streak of 21-straight playoff appearances as the fifth seed. They were defeated in five games by their opening-round opponent, the Nashville Predators.

On Thursday, May 31, 2012, Nicklas Lidstrom retired after his 20th consecutive NHL season, and sixth year as captain of the Detroit Red Wings. Later in the off-season, fellow longtime Swedish Red Wing Tomas Holmstrom would also retire.

=== 2013–2017: The Henrik Zetterberg and Pavel Datsyuk era ===
Henrik Zetterberg was named successor to Nicklas Lidstrom as team captain. On July 1, 2012, the first day of the NHL free agency period, the Detroit Red Wings signed Swiss forward Damien Brunner to a one-year, entry-level contract; forward Jordin Tootoo to a three-year, $5.7 million contract; and goaltender Jonas Gustavsson to a two-year, $3 million deal.

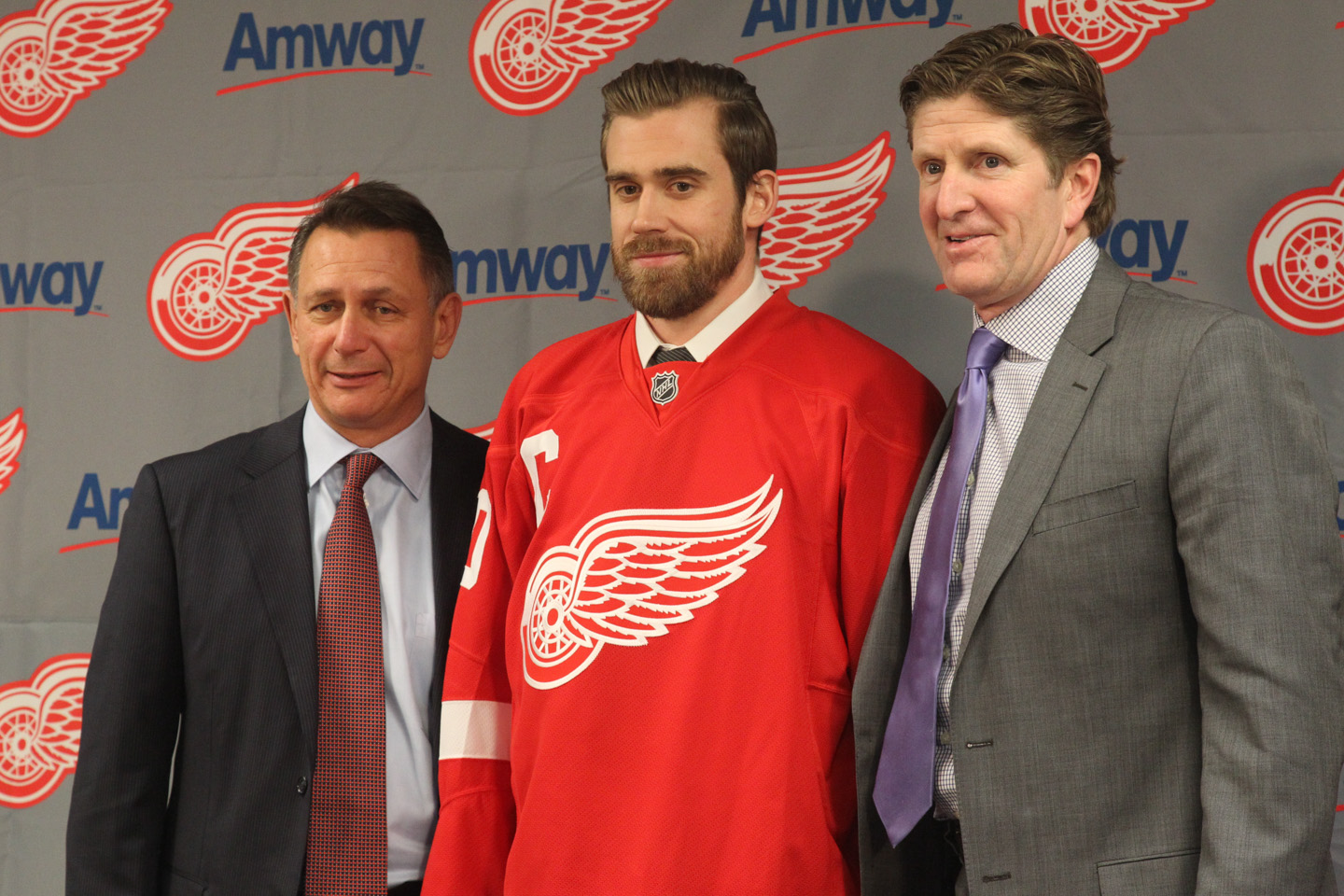
Zetterberg was named as the Red Wings team captain in 2013.

The team won their final four games of the 2012–13 season to earn the seventh seed of the playoffs. The Red Wings' 3–0 victory over the Dallas Stars on April 27, 2013, clinched a playoff appearance; had they lost the game in regulation, they would have missed the playoffs by one point. Detroit's win preserved their streak of 22 consecutive playoff appearances, extending their North American professional sports franchise record.

As the seventh seed in the 2013 playoffs, the Red Wings faced the second-seeded Anaheim Ducks. The Wings survived a fierce battle that included four overtime games, winning the series 4–3 after a 3–2 Game 7 victory in Anaheim. The next round pitted the Red Wings against the top-seeded and eventual Stanley cup winners Chicago, and also went seven games. On May 29, the Wings were eliminated from the playoffs in a 2–1 overtime loss to the 'Hawks in Game 7.

On July 5, 2013, the Red Wings signed long time Ottawa Senators captain Daniel Alfredsson to a one-year contract and long time Florida Panther Stephen Weiss to a five-year contract. In the 2013–14 season, the Red Wings moved to the Atlantic Division of the Eastern Conference. On News Years Day 2014, the Red Wings hosted the Toronto Maple Leafs at Michigan Stadium for the 2014 NHL Winter Classic. The following game set an NHL attendance record, with 105,491 in attendance for the game. On April 9, 2014, the Red Wings clinched their 23rd consecutive playoff appearance, though they were eliminated in the first round by the Boston Bruins in five games.

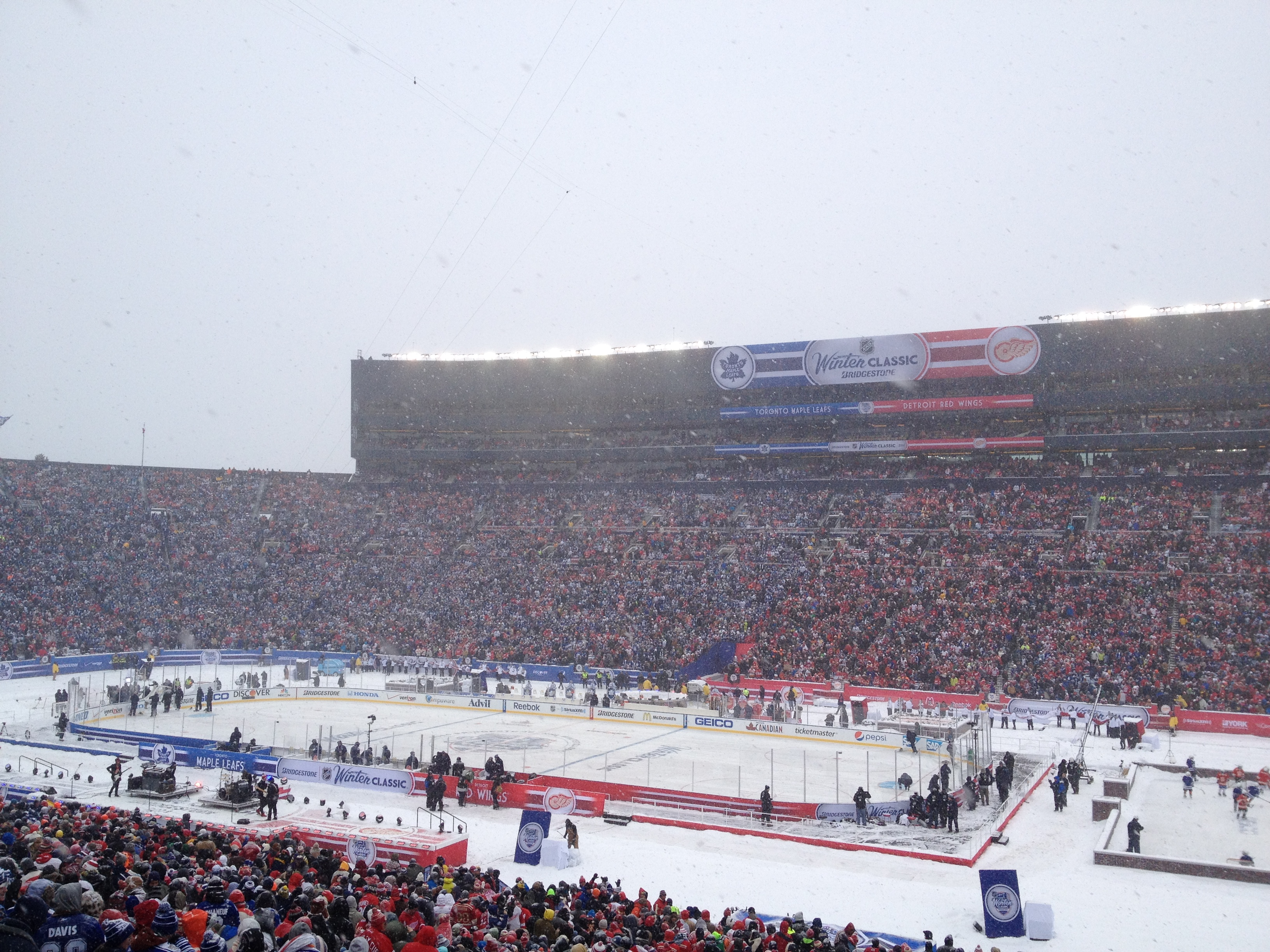
In January 2014, the Red Wings hosted the Toronto Maple Leafs for the 2014 NHL Winter Classic.

On April 9, 2015, after the 2014–15 regular season, the Red Wings clinched their 24th consecutive playoff appearance, thus extending the longest streak in the four major North American sports. The team, however, was eliminated in the first round by the Tampa Bay Lightning in seven games. Head coach Mike Babcock, concluding the final year of his contract, left the Red Wings and became coach of the Toronto Maple Leafs. Dylan Larkin signed a contract with the Red Wings the day after. Jeff Blashill, head coach of the Red Wings' top farm club, the Grand Rapids Griffins, was named his successor on June 9.

During the 2015–16 season, the Detroit Red Wings extended their North American major sports playoff streak to 25 seasons; they would be eliminated in the first round by the Lightning for the second consecutive season, in five games.

On February 10, 2017, Red Wings owner Mike Ilitch died at the age of 87.

In the 2016-17 season, the Red Wings missed the playoffs for the first time since the 1989-90 season, ending their playoff streak at 25 seasons.

On April 9, 2017, the Red Wings beat the New Jersey Devils 4–1 in the final game played at Joe Louis Arena. Riley Sheahan scored his only two goals of the season in that game.

=== 2017–present: Opening of Little Caesars Arena and rebuilding ===
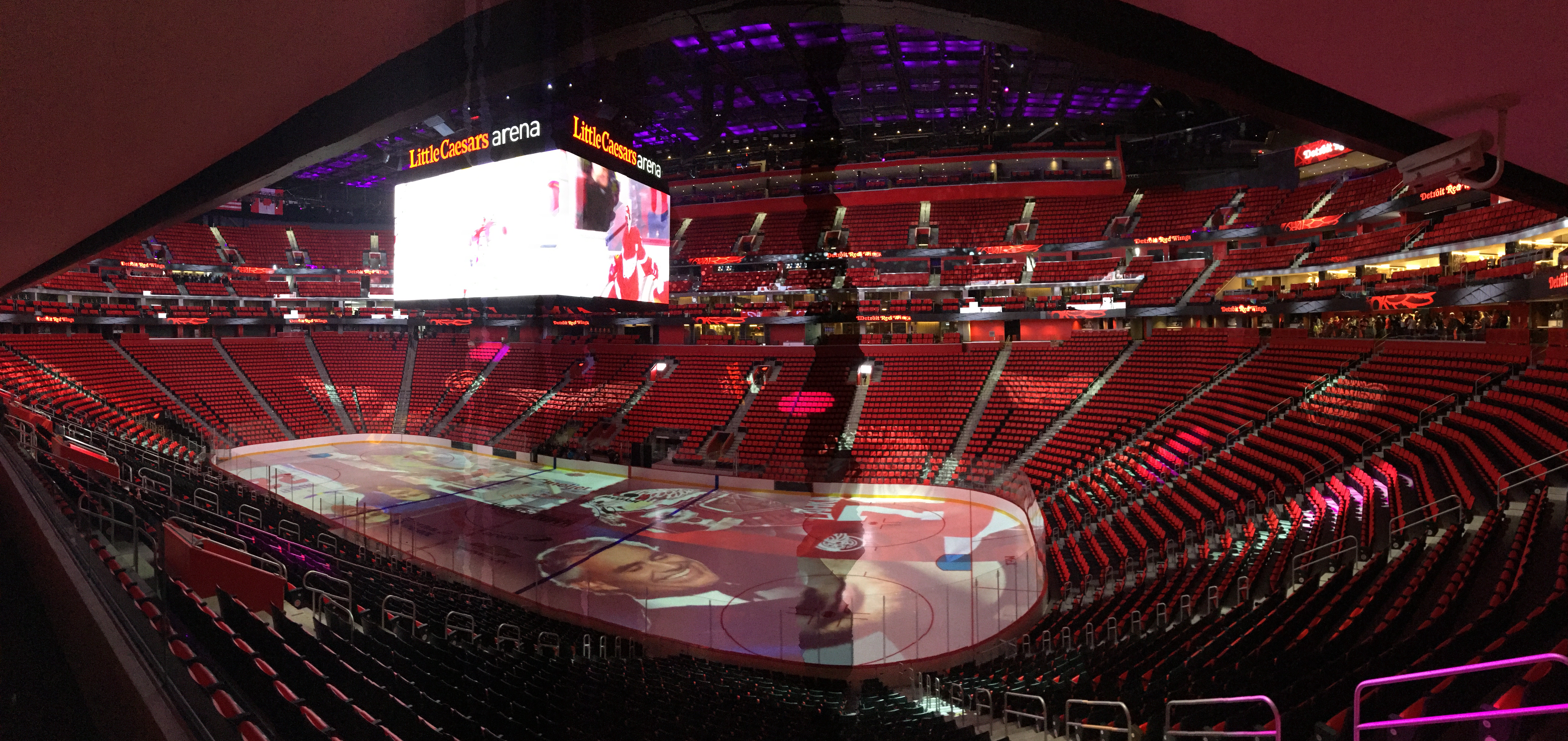
Interior of Little Caesars Arena in September 2017, a month before the Red Wings begin regular season play in the arena.

The Red Wings played their first regular season game at Little Caesars Arena on October 5, 2017, winning 4–2 over the Minnesota Wild. The Red Wings finished the 2017–18 season with a 30–39–13 record. They missed the playoffs for the second season in a row, marking the first time since the early 1980s the team missed the playoffs in consecutive years. The Red Wings finished the 2018–19 season with a 32–40–10 record, missing the playoffs for a third consecutive season.

On April 19, 2019, the Red Wings announced that Steve Yzerman would rejoin the team as general manager and executive vice president.

On March 12, 2020, the 2019-2020 NHL season was suspended due to the COVID-19 pandemic and on May 26 the regular NHL season was declared over by NHL officials. This left the Red Wings with a 17-49-5 record, missing the playoffs for a fourth consecutive time. This marked the first time since the 1985–86 Detroit Red Wings season that the team had the worst record in the league and was also the first time since the 1985-86 season that the Red Wings got less than 20 wins in a single season. In the 2020-2021 season, the NHL regular season was reduced from 82 games to 56 games. The Red Wings ended the season with a 19-27-10 record, missing the playoffs for the fifth consecutive year. in the 2021-2022 season, the NHL regular season was lengthened back to 82 games. The Red Wings ended the season with a 32-40-10 record, missing the playoffs for the sixth consecutive year.

On June 21, 2022, Red Wings defenseman Moritz Seider was awarded the Calder Memorial Trophy for his exceptional rookie performance.

On April 30, 2022, Detroit Red Wings general manager Steve Yzerman announced that Jeff Blashill's contract would not be extended, thus marking the end of Blashill's coaching career with the team. On June 30, Yzerman announced that the new coach of the team would be former Tampa Bay Lightning coach Derek Lalonde.

== See also ==
- History of the National Hockey League

== Footnotes ==
- ^{a} The Cougars, Black Hawks, Rangers, Pittsburgh Pirates, New York Americans, Montreal Maroons, Boston Bruins, Ottawa Senators, Toronto Maple Leafs, and Montreal Canadiens.
