= Hawkvision =

American regional sports network

- Type: Pay television network (sports)
- Availability: United States
- Headquarters: Chicago, IL
- Owner: Wirtz Corporation
- Launch date: 1992; 34 years ago
- Dissolved: 1995; 31 years ago

Hawkvision was an American subscription television service founded by Wirtz Corporation and Chicago Blackhawks owner Bill Wirtz. The service broadcast Chicago Blackhawks games. It operated in conjunction with Chicago's local version of SportsChannel, and access cost $29.95 per month.

== Overview ==
In 1992, Wirtz, who had a reputation for stubbornness and frugality, ended all Blackhawks broadcast agreements with network and cable television outlets. While vilified for this decision by many Blackhawks fans, he felt that broadcasting regular home games was unfair to the team's season-ticket holders. Only Blackhawks games picked up by national broadcasters (which only happened when the Blackhawks made the playoffs) were shown on basic cable (complicated further by SportsChannel America having various issues with carriage).

Hawkvision only broadcast for a short time, ending after the 1994–95 season. However, regular Blackhawk home games did not resume airing on television until the 2007–08 season after Wirtz's death. His son Rocky took over the team's operations and agreed to allow WGN-TV and NBC Sports Chicago to carry those games.

Similar subscription TV services were utilized for the Montreal Canadiens and Winnipeg Jets by rightsholder TSN from 2010 through 2014.
