= Wine and Spirits =

Wine and Spirits may refer to:

- Wine & Spirit, a British wine and alcohol publication aimed at consumers and the drinks industry
- Wine & Spirits, an American wine magazine
- Wine and Spirits Fair Dealing Act, an infamous and short-lived Illinois law

== See also ==
- Wines & Spirits, 2007 album by Rahsaan Patterson
