= Arthur Wirtz =

American sports businessman (1901–1983)

- Born: Arthur Michael Wirtz; January 23, 1901; Chicago, Illinois
- Died: July 21, 1983 (aged 82); Chicago, Illinois
- Education: University of Michigan
- Occupations: Founder of Wirtz Corporation; Owner of: Chicago Stadium; Bismarck Hotel; Chicago Black Hawks; Chicago Bulls
- Spouse: Virginia Wirtz
- Children: 4, including Bill Wirtz
- Family: Rocky Wirtz (grandson); Danny Wirtz (great grandson)

Arthur Michael Wirtz (January 23, 1901 – July 21, 1983) was an American entrepreneur. He was the founder of Wirtz Corporation, a holding company that owned Chicago Stadium, the Bismarck Hotel in Chicago, the Chicago Black Hawks, and the Chicago Bulls. He was the father of the late Blackhawks owner Bill Wirtz, as well as the grandfather of the late Blackhawks owner Rocky Wirtz, who died on July 25, 2023.

== Early life and education ==
Wirtz was born on January 23, 1901, in Chicago, Illinois, the son of Leona and Fredrick Wirtz. His father was a police officer. In 1922, he graduated from the University of Michigan.

== Career ==
After school, he worked as a commercial leasing broker with fellow graduate Arthur Rubloff. In 1929, he partnered with grain trader and real estate investor, James E. Norris, who was impressed with how Wirtz handled one of his real estate transactions. During the Great Depression, the Wirtz-Norris partnership began to purchase arenas at much reduced prices. In 1933, they purchased the Olympia Stadium in Detroit, Michigan and its hockey franchise, the Detroit Falcons, which they renamed the Detroit Red Wings for $100,000. In 1935, they purchased the Chicago Stadium. Wirtz was able to fill his stadiums after securing and booking the Hollywood Ice Revue produced by and starring Olympic ice skating champion Sonja Henie. He used the proceeds to pay off the mortgage on the Chicago Stadium and also purchase Madison Square Garden in New York City and the St. Louis Arena. In 1946, he and James D. Norris helped Bill Tobin purchase the nearly bankrupt Chicago Blackhawks. Wirtz continued to help run the Red Wings. In the summer of 1951, Arthur Wirtz left Detroit to join the (Chicago) board of directors. In 1949, he and Jim Norris (the son of James) founded the International Boxing Club which presided over 47 of 51 championships through 1955. As Wirtz and Norris had control over most of the major sporting venues east of the Mississippi, federal authorities ended their boxing monopoly in 1958 and forced them to sell Madison Square Garden. In 1972, he partnered with Lester Crown from team founder Dick Klein and purchased a controlling stake in the Chicago Bulls In 1974, he lost a lawsuit brought by Milwaukee real estate magnate Marvin Fishman accusing him of illegally preventing Fishman's purchase of the Bulls.

Wirtz was an important showbiz figure with his presentation of the Sonja Henie Ice Show, which toured arenas for many years. He was also involved with the Henie-produced ice shows which played the Center Theatre at Rockefeller Center in New York for several seasons. Wirtz took over the ownership of Ice Follies and Holiday on Ice, which he later sold to Irvin and Kenneth Feld.

== Honors ==
He succeeded Bill Tobin as President of the Chicago Black Hawks in 1954 and quickly turned the franchise around, winning the Stanley Cup in 1961. He was inducted into the Hockey Hall of Fame in 1971.

== Personal life and death ==
In 1926, he married Virginia Wirtz; they had four children: William Wirtz; Michael Wirtz; Cynthia Wirtz MacArthur; and Elizabeth Wirtz. Arthur Wirtz died of cancer on July 21, 1983, at age 82 in his Chicago home. Services were held at the Fourth Presbyterian Church in Chicago.

== Awards and achievements ==
- 1936, 1937, 1943, 1950, Stanley Cup Championship (Detroit)
- 1961 Stanley Cup Championship (Chicago)
- Hockey Hall of Fame, inducted 1971
- Chicagoan of the Year, 1977
- Lester Patrick Trophy, 1985

Sporting positions
Preceded by Bill Tobin	Chicago Blackhawks principal owner 1950–1983; Served alongside: James D. Norris (1950–66); Bill Wirtz (1966–83)	Succeeded by Bill Wirtz
