= Bill Wirtz =

American businessman (1929–2007)

- Wirtz in 1998 introducing Dirk Graham as head coach
- Born: William Wadsworth Wirtz; October 5, 1929; Chicago, Illinois
- Died: September 26, 2007 (aged 77); Evanston, Illinois
- Occupations: Business Executive; Owner of Chicago Blackhawks and Wirtz Corporation
- Children: Rocky Wirtz

William Wadsworth Wirtz (October 5, 1929 – September 26, 2007) was the chief executive officer and controlling shareholder of the family-owned Wirtz Corporation. He was best known as the owner of the Chicago Blackhawks of the National Hockey League, who are part of Wirtz Corp's holdings. Wirtz also served as the Blackhawks' team president for over four decades.

== Biography ==
=== Early life ===
William (Bill) Wirtz was born to Arthur Wirtz and Virginia. He grew up in Chicago and attended the Latin School of Chicago where he was a star athlete in football and track. He planned to study at Princeton University after his senior year but decided to attend Brown University instead with his best friend. He graduated from Brown University In Providence, Rhode Island in 1950.

=== Wealth ===
Bill Wirtz (via his stake in the Wirtz Corporation) was most notable as the owner of the Chicago Blackhawks; Wirtz Realty, a large real estate owner in Chicago; and Judge & Dolph Ltd., a major liquor distributor selling over 33 percent of all liquor in Illinois. Wirtz Corporation also has interests in banking and insurance and co-owns the United Center with Jerry Reinsdorf. Crain's Chicago Business in 2004 estimated the company's 2003 revenues as $1.3 billion. Overall, it is estimated that Bill Wirtz's personal holdings including stock in several companies (among them, Alberto-Culver and Firstar Bank) were worth about $3 to $4 billion.

Wirtz sold the Holiday on Ice and Ice Follies for $12 million to Irvin & Kenneth Feld Productions in 1979.

=== Blackhawks ownership ===
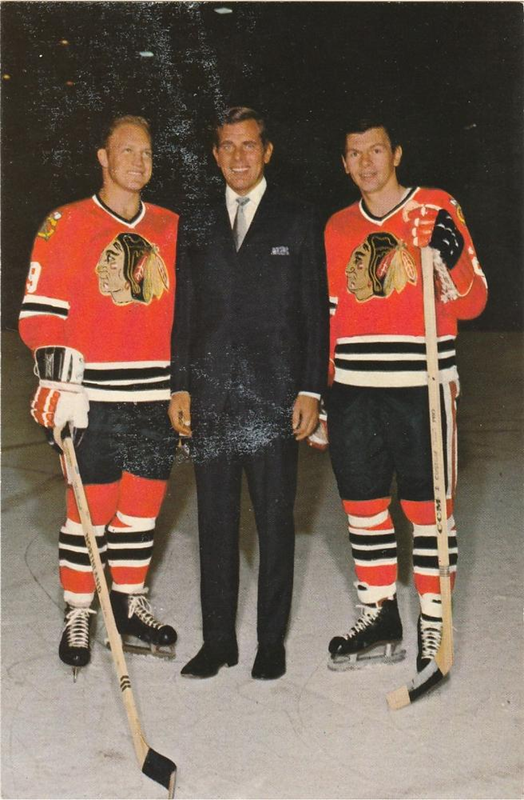
1970-71 photo of Wirtz (center) with Bobby Hull and Stan Mikita.

Bill Wirtz was the team president of the Blackhawks for 41 years and served as chairman of the Board of Governors of the NHL for 18 years, helping to merge the NHL and the World Hockey Association during the 1970s.

As owner of the Blackhawks, Wirtz had a reputation for stubbornness and frugality, earning the nickname "Dollar" Bill. He was vilified by Blackhawks fans for forbidding home games to be televised unless they were picked up by national broadcasters, which only happened when the Blackhawks made the playoffs. As Wirtz explained it, broadcasting regular-season home games was unfair to season-ticket holders. For a short time during the 1991–92 and 1992–93 seasons, Wirtz introduced Hawkvision (pay television that operated in conjunction with Chicago's local SportsChannel outfit). It cost $29.95 per month and broadcast Blackhawks home games.

Wirtz was blamed for allowing Bobby Hull to leave the Blackhawks and the NHL for the World Hockey Association (although his father, Arthur Wirtz, was actually responsible for the decision). Wirtz was further blamed for the loss of both Dominik Hašek and Ed Belfour, for trading Denis Savard in 1990, for the trade of Chris Chelios to the Detroit Red Wings (actually Chelios told general manager Bob Murray to trade him-Detroit was the most interested team), for the trading of Jeremy Roenick, and the 1967 trade of Phil Esposito. Wirtz was also criticized for the Blackhawks' Stanley Cup drought, which was the third longest in NHL history and the longest in team history. Under the ownership of Wirtz, the Chicago Blackhawks were named by ESPN in 2004 as the worst franchise in sports. In 2002, ESPN ranked Wirtz as the third greediest owner in all of sports.

In spite of his vocal critics, Wirtz was inducted into the Hockey Hall of Fame in 1976 and the United States Hockey Hall of Fame in 1985. He was considered by many (including former Blackhawks general manager, Dale Tallon; retired hockey star Stan Mikita, and former Blackhawk Martin Lapointe) to be a generous and fiercely loyal man. In 1993, he established Blackhawk Charities which has donated millions of dollars to the Boys and Girls Clubs and the Amateur Hockey Association of Illinois, among other groups.

Wirtz was on the Olympic Committees for both the 1980 and 1984 Winter Olympics.

=== "The Wirtz Law" ===
In 1999, the Illinois State Legislature passed the Wine and Spirits Fair Dealing Act, ("The Wirtz Law"). The bill was passed after more than $700,000 was contributed to politicians by liquor distributors according to the Illinois Campaign for Political Reform. The law was on the books for less than three years before a U.S. district court judge struck it down on the grounds that it violated the commerce clause of the Constitution. Newspaper editorials at the time often called the Wirtz Law a corrupt document, and it has since become a case study for campaign finance reform.

=== Personal life and death ===
In 1950, Wirtz married Joan Roney. They had five children: two sons, Rocky Wirtz and Peter Wirtz; and three daughters, Gail Wirtz Costello, Karey Wirtz Fix, and Alyson Wirtz. Joan died in 1983, the same year his father died. In 1987, Bill Wirtz married Alice Wirtz.

Bill Wirtz died at Evanston Hospital in Evanston, Illinois on September 26, 2007, following a brief battle with cancer. Services for Bill Wirtz were held at the Fourth Presbyterian Church in Chicago. During a tribute and moment of silence for Bill Wirtz during the Blackhawks' home opener on October 6, 2007, the crowd booed.

Bill Wirtz's youngest son Peter, who was serving as executive vice president of the Blackhawks, was initially the heir-apparent of the Blackhawks and became the new owner the next day after the senior Wirtz died. Not wanting to go through a rebuild, Peter soon resigned as Blackhawks vice president and assumed responsibility for another Wirtz Corp. businesses, Bismarck Enterprises. Ownership of the team was passed to Wirtz' oldest son Rocky, although Rocky had no prior direct involvement with the team. Rocky immediately altered many of his father's policies on running the Blackhawks, which resulted in a resurgence of public support for the team and three Stanley Cup championships. Rocky remained chairman and controlling owner of the Blackhawks until his death in 2023. Rocky was in turn succeeded by his son Danny.

== See also ==
- List of members of the United States Hockey Hall of Fame

Sporting positions
Preceded by James D. Norris	Chicago Blackhawks principal owner 1966–2007; Served alongside: Arthur Wirtz (1966–83)	Succeeded by Danny Wirtz
Preceded by William M. Jennings	Chairman of the NHL Board of Governors; 1970–1972	Succeeded by Bruce Norris
Preceded by Bruce Norris	Chairman of the NHL Board of Governors; 1973–1976	Succeeded by John Ziegler
Preceded by John Ziegler	Chairman of the NHL Board of Governors; 1977–1992	Succeeded by Bruce McNall
