= Net Worth (1995 film) =

1995 Canadian television film

- Promotional poster
- Based on: Net Worth: Exploding the Myths of Pro Hockey by: David Cruise; Alison Griffiths
- Screenplay by: Don Truckey; Phil Savath; David Cruise; Allison Griffiths
- Directed by: Jerry Ciccoritti
- Starring: Aidan Devine; Kevin Conway; R. H. Thomson; Al Waxman
- Composer: John McCarthy
- Country of origin: Canada
- Original language: English

Production
- Producer: Bernie Zuckerman
- Cinematography: Barry Stone
- Editor: George Roulston
- Running time: 92 minutes
- Production company: Morningstar Entertainment

Original release
- Network: CBC
- Release: November 26, 1995

Net Worth is a 1995 Canadian biographical drama television film directed by Jerry Ciccoritti, based on the 1991 book Net Worth: Exploding the Myths of Pro Hockey by journalists David Cruise and Alison Griffiths. Starring Aidan Devine, Kevin Conway, R. H. Thomson, and Al Waxman, the film premiered on CBC on November 26, 1995.

== Premise ==
Based on the true story of the Detroit Red Wings' Ted Lindsay, a nine-time NHL All-Star who, along with Doug Harvey of the Montreal Canadiens, headed up a small group of players in a battle to protect the rights of players against monopolistic NHL owners of the 1950s era, including Bruce Norris of the Red Wings, Conn Smythe of the Toronto Maple Leafs, and James D. Norris of the Chicago Black Hawks as well as NHL president, Clarence Campbell. The film focuses on the conflict between Lindsay and Jack Adams, Detroit's general manager, as well as Lindsay's struggle to win over the trust and support of the players, including Lindsay's long-time teammate, the legendary Gordie Howe, amidst coercion and threats from the league and the owners. Lindsay's efforts would ultimately result in the formation of the NHL Players Association.

== Cast ==
- Aidan Devine as Ted Lindsay
- Kevin Conway as Gordie Howe
- R. H. Thomson as Milton Mound
- Al Waxman as Jack Adams
- Scott Speedman as Rookie

== Awards and honors ==
=== Gemini Awards ===
The film won four Gemini Awards presented by the Academy of Canadian Cinema and Television and was nominated in a further four categories.

Won

- Gemini Award (1997) for Best Direction in a Dramatic Program (Jerry Ciccoritti)
- Gemini Award (1997) for Best Performance by an Actor in a Featured Supporting Role in a Dramatic Program (Al Waxman)
- Gemini Award (1997) for Best Performance by an Actor in a Leading Role in a Dramatic Program (Aidan Devine)
- Gemini Award (1997) for Best TV Movie (Bernard Zuckerman)

Nominated

- Gemini Award (1997) for Best Costume Design (Tulla Nixon)
- Gemini Award (1997) for Best Performance by an Actor in a Featured Supporting Role in a Dramatic Program (Carl Marotte)
- Gemini Award (1997) for Best Picture Editing in a Dramatic Program or Series (George Roulston)
- Gemini Award (1997) for Best Production Design or Art Direction (Arthur Harriot)

== See also ==
- List of films about ice hockey
