= Bruce Norris =

Bruce Norris is the name of:

- Bruce Norris (ice hockey) (1924–1986), former owner of the Detroit Red Wings
- Bruce Norris (playwright) (born 1960), American actor and playwright
- Bruce Norris (character), a character from the CHERUB book series
