= Bill Adams (ice hockey) =

Canadian ice hockey player

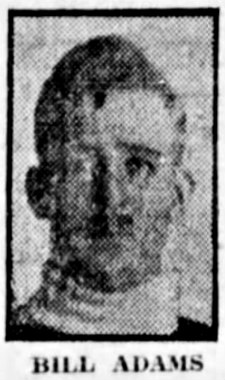
- Born: March 29, 1897; Fort William, Ontario, Canada
- Died: February 4, 1978 (aged 80); Broward County, Florida, USA
- Height: 5 ft 9 in (175 cm)
- Weight: 185 lb (84 kg; 13 st 3 lb)
- Position: Left wing
- Shot: Left
- Played for: Regina Capitals; Vancouver Millionaires
- Playing career: 1913–1921

William Vernon Adams (March 29, 1897 – February 4, 1978) was a Canadian professional ice hockey player. He played with the Regina Capitals of the Western Canada Hockey League, and with the Vancouver Millionaires of the Pacific Coast Hockey Association. He was a younger brother of Hockey Hall of Fame member Jack Adams. William V. Adams died on February 4, 1978, at Florida, United States.
