= Wine and Spirits Fair Dealing Act =

1999 Illinois state law

The Wine and Spirits Fair Dealing Act, also known as the Wirtz Law, was an infamous Illinois state law passed in 1999 that prevented distillers and wineries from changing distributors without "just cause". Distributors stated that the law was required to prevent producers from severing ties with Illinois distributors and "outsourcing" their deals, ostensibly resulting in thousands of job losses throughout the state. After the law was passed, all Illinois distributors raised their prices. The Federal Trade Commission actively lobbied against the law, to no avail.

The unofficial "Wirtz Law" name comes from the fact that the law was passed after Wirtz Corporation owner Bill Wirtz and other distributors had contributed over $700,000 to Illinois state legislators; editorials at the time decried the law as a "corrupt document".

Shortly after passage, a group of out-of-state wineries filed lawsuits in federal court against their Illinois distributors and the Illinois Liquor Control Commission. In 2000, a judge granted them preliminary injunctions, saying that the law violated the Commerce Clause of the U.S. Constitution. This was upheld on appeal. Finally, in 2002 the unpopular Wirtz Law was struck down. The law and its history went on to become a case study for campaign finance reform.

An earlier, similar law, the Beer Industry Fair Dealing Act (which dated to 1982), resulted in a popular Michigan microbrewer, Bell's Brewery, getting into a dispute with their distributor and pulling their products from the Illinois market entirely in protest in 2006. Bell's re-entered the Chicago market in 2007 via two new distributors by creating two new beer brands, Kalamazoo Royal Amber Ale and Kalamazoo Hopsoulution. Since each beer avoided the use of the "Bell's" name and logo, and used a different recipe from previous Bell's brands, Larry Bell contended that these are not the same beers that were assigned to his former distributor. Nevertheless, Bell stated at the time that he expected "to be sued by his former distributor, National Wine & Spirits." Initially, only the Royal Amber Ale was made available, in draft only, at about a dozen Chicago-area locations. In August 2008, Bell's returned its primary brands to the Chicago area after National Wine & Spirits' exit from Illinois, upon the sale of their Illinois distributorship to Wirtz Beverage Group.
