= James D. Norris =

American businessman (1906–1966)

- Born: November 6, 1906; Chicago, Illinois, US
- Died: February 25, 1966 (aged 59); Chicago, Illinois, US
- Occupations: Commodities dealer, sports team owner, racehorse owner/breeder
- Board member of: Norris Grain Company; Detroit Red Wings; Chicago Blackhawks; Madison Square Garden; International Boxing Club of New York
- Spouse: Mary
- Children: Susan Mary
- Parent: James E. Norris
- Relatives: Bruce Norris; Marguerite Norris
- Honors: Hockey Hall of Fame (1962)

James Dougan Norris (November 6, 1906 – February 25, 1966) was an American sports businessman, with interests in boxing, ice hockey, and horse racing. He was the son of James E. Norris (the namesake of the James Norris Memorial Trophy) and half-brother of Bruce Norris and Marguerite Norris. He is a member of the Hockey Hall of Fame.

== Biography ==
Born in Chicago, Norris served as a lieutenant with the United States Navy during World War II. In business, he was a partner in the commodity brokerage firm, Norris and Kenly, and became involved in hockey by working for his father, who bought the Detroit Red Wings of the National Hockey League (NHL) in 1932, followed by the purchase of Chicago Stadium, home rink of the Chicago Black Hawks. In 1946, James D. Norris was one of a group that purchased the Chicago Black Hawks along with Bill Tobin (left Chicago Black Hawks in 1954) and Arthur M. Wirtz Sr. However, he remained a Vice President with the Detroit Red Wings until the summer of 1952. That summer he left to help Arthur M. Wirtz Sr. run the Black Hawks.

Norris' father passed along several of the family's businesses to him in the late 1940s, including a significant ownership position in Norris Grain Company and Madison Square Garden, which owned another NHL team, the New York Rangers. The Norris family effectively controlled one-half of the NHL.

In 1949, Norris and Wirtz formed the International Boxing Club of New York (IBC) to promote fights in Chicago, Detroit and New York, each with stadiums (Madison Square, Chicago Stadium and Detroit Olympia) controlled by the Norris family. The IBC dominated boxing in the U.S. in the 1950s. As president of the IBC, Norris was involved with organized crime figures. Norris was responsible for fixing numerous bouts. Besides match fixing, he was also unofficially managing many boxers (usually against their will) and persuading them to hire his associates as advisors. The IBC monopoly on professional boxing led to an anti-trust lawsuit by the US Department of Justice. A court decision in the case was rendered in 1957, forcing Norris and Wirtz to dissolve the IBC and sell their shares in Madison Square Garden within five years, which they did in 1959.

In 1957, Norris, along with his half brother Bruce Norris and other NHL owners of the time, were accused of union busting activities related to the attempt by Ted Lindsay and a group of NHL players to form an NHL Players Association. Mr. Norris' role in those affairs are dramatized in the movie Net Worth.

The Blackhawks won the Stanley Cup in 1961, with Norris as chairman. Norris was elected to the Hockey Hall of Fame in 1962.

Among his investments, James Norris held interests in the Rock Island Railroad, the Chicago Furniture Mart, and Chicago's Bismarck Hotel. Norris owned thoroughbred racehorses as well as Spring Hill Farm in Paris, Kentucky. His horses raced in the United States and in Canada where his colt, Rocky Royale, won the 1960 Canadian International Stakes. In 1938 his horse Danger Point, ridden by Eddie Arcaro, won the Metropolitan Handicap.

Like his father, Norris suffered from heart problems and had two heart attacks. He died in Chicago in 1966 at age 59, with a reported net worth of US$250,000,000 (equivalent to $2,480,769,231 in 2025). Shortly before his death, Norris had arranged for an NHL franchise to be awarded to St. Louis, Missouri, even though no one from St. Louis applied for a franchise. Norris owned the St. Louis Arena.

== Awards and achievements ==
- 1936, 1937, 1943, 1950, 1952 Stanley Cup (Detroit)
- 1961 Stanley Cup (Chicago)

== See also ==
- Tom Duggan

Sporting positions
| Preceded by Bill Tobin | Chicago Blackhawks principal owner 1950–1966; Served alongside: Arthur Wirtz | Succeeded by Danny Wirtz |
| Preceded by Conn Smythe | Chairman of the NHL Board of Governors; 1957–1966 | Succeeded by Bruce Norris |
