= Marguerite Norris =

American ice hockey executive

- Born: February 16, 1927; Chicago, Illinois, US
- Died: May 12, 1994 (aged 67); Waterbury, Connecticut, US
- Education: Smith College
- Occupations: Sports team owner and executive
- Board member of: Detroit Red Wings
- Spouse: John J. Riker (m. 1960)
- Parent: James E. Norris
- Relatives: James D. Norris (brother); Bruce Norris (brother)

Marguerite Ann Norris (February 16, 1927 – May 12, 1994), also known as Marguerite Riker or Marguerite Norris-Riker, was an American ice hockey executive. She was the first female team executive in National Hockey League (NHL) history.

== Early life and education ==
Norris was born to James E. Norris in 1927 and was the sister of Bruce and James D. Norris. As the youngest sibling of four, she was often made the goaltender for her brothers to practice. Norris was educated at Smith College and worked for West Farm Management and Dun & Bradstreet.

== Hockey career ==
Norris became president of the Detroit Red Wings of the National Hockey League (NHL) after her father James E. Norris died in 1952, making her the first female chief executive in the history of the league. General Manager Jack Adams announced that Norris was selected by her father prior to his death to succeed him as president. In her first meeting with the press, she was surrounded by hockey reporters, fashion reporters, and photographers. Prior to Norris' first game with the Red Wings against the Montreal Canadiens, Maurice Richard made an exception to his usual rule of "fraternizing with the enemy" after he was selected by his head coach to present her with flowers. It was later reported this angered him so much he took six minor penalties in the first period.

Shortly after her takeover, reports emerged that the arena was cleaner, freshly painted, and a wire screen was in place to protect fans from flying pucks. Norris also advocated for arenas to be more female fan friendly and for all farm teams to be equally treated across the system.

During her tenure with the Red Wings, she saw the team finish first three years in a row and win the Stanley Cup in both the 1954 and 1955 seasons, making her the first woman to have her name engraved on the Stanley Cup. However, despite her success, she still experienced discrimination based on her gender. Conn Smythe forbade Norris from sitting on the Board of Governors although she secretly voted through Jack Adams using hand gestures. Although Adams was more than willing to serve as Marguerite's proxy, he bristled at having to answer to a woman who was in her late 20s and was more than 30 years his junior. For instance, he insisted on calling her "dearie." Marguerite could have summarily fired Adams, who hadn't signed a contract with the Red Wings since her father bought the team in 1932 and allowed Adams to keep his job on probation. However, Marguerite didn't do so.

After the championship 1955 season, Marguerite lost an interfamily struggle to Bruce, who became team president while Marguerite was demoted to Vice President. She then focused on her business interests in New York City. She and her siblings donated $300, 000 to fund the James Norris Physical Education Center at Lake Superior State University.

Years later, Red Wings great Gordie Howe wrote in his autobiography, Mr. Hockey: My Story, that Marguerite's ouster spelled the beginning of the end of the Red Wings' golden age, in which they'd finished first in eight out of 10 seasons–including seven in a row–and won four Cups. Howe believed that Marguerite was "smart and capable," as did many of his teammates. He also noted that Marguerite had been able to rein in Adams' inclination to "upset the apple cart" with blockbuster trades, as evidenced by Adams trading away eight players who had formed the core of the 1955 champions within days of Bruce taking over the team presidency. The Red Wings would not win another Cup until 1997.

Despite her short tenure, she was inducted into the Red Wings Hall of Fame in 1976 alongside Jimmy Skinner and Tommy Ivan.

== Personal life ==
Norris married her husband John J. Riker on October 26, 1960 in New York. Together, they had four children; two daughters and two sons. Norris and Riker co-owned The Westenhook Farm in Southbury, Connecticut.

She died in 1994 at age 67 at her home in Southbury, Connecticut due to heart failure.
