= Jack Adams =

Canadian ice hockey player and coach (1894–1964)

- Hockey Hall of Fame, 1959
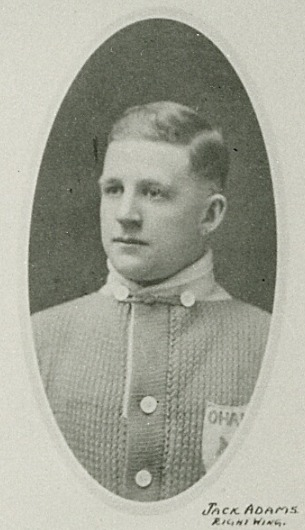
- Born: June 14, 1894 Fort William, Ontario, Canada
- Died: May 1, 1968 (aged 73) Detroit, Michigan, U.S.
- Height: 5 ft 9 in (175 cm)
- Weight: 175 lb (79 kg; 12 st 7 lb)
- Position: Centre
- Shot: Right
- Played for: Toronto Arenas; Vancouver Millionaires; Toronto St. Patricks; Ottawa Senators
- Playing career: 1917–1927

John James "Jolly Jack" Adams (June 14, 1894 – May 1, 1968) was a Canadian professional ice hockey player, coach, and general manager in the National Hockey League (NHL) and Pacific Coast Hockey Association. He played for the Toronto Arenas, Vancouver Millionaires, Toronto St. Patricks and Ottawa Senators between 1917 and 1927. He won the Stanley Cup twice as a player, with Toronto in 1918 and Ottawa in 1927, and was inducted into the Hockey Hall of Fame.

After retiring, Adams began a 36-year association with the Detroit Red Wings of the NHL as head coach and as a general manager. He held the record of the winningest coach in Red Wings history until 2014. He later became the first president of the Central Professional Hockey League. Adams won the Stanley Cup a further seven times with the Red Wings and is the only person to have won the Stanley Cup as a player, coach, and general manager.

== Playing career ==
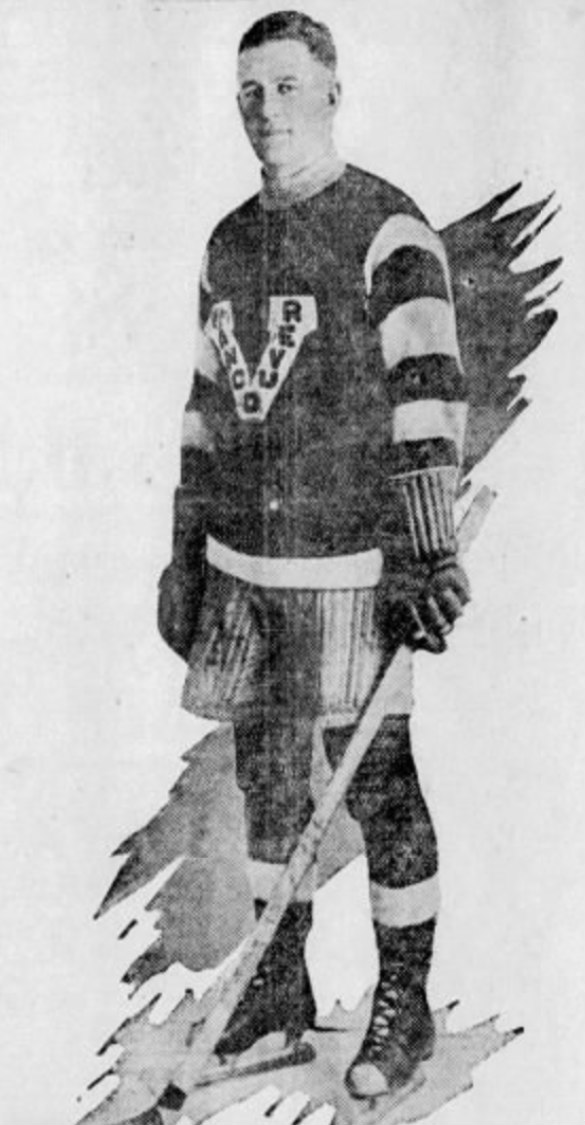
Adams with the Vancouver Millionaires

Born in Fort William, Ontario, Jack Adams began his career with the Fort William Maple Leafs in 1914 of the NMHL and then played for the Calumet Miners a year later. In 1916, he joined the intermediate Peterborough 247th Battalion of the Ontario Hockey Association and the next season moved up to the senior Sarnia Sailors. His younger brother Bill also was a professional hockey player, with the Regina Capitals and the Vancouver Millionaires.

Adams turned pro in 1917 upon joining the Toronto Arenas of the NHL for the 1917–18, earning the reputation as a physical, bruising player. Although he participated in the NHL playoffs, he did not play in any games in the 1918 Stanley Cup Final against the Vancouver Millionaires when the Torontos won the trophy.

In March 1918 he was drafted into the Canadian military as part of the First World War, and was sent to the United Kingdom in April. He was discharged that November as the war ended and returned to Canada shortly after.

In December 1919 he was moved west alongside his brother Bill to join the Vancouver Millionaires, where he flourished as a player, leading the league in scoring in 1921–22, when he centred a line with Alf Skinner and Smokey Harris. The February 26, 1922 issue of the Vancouver Sun, commenting on Adams' playing style, complimented him on his strong hands and his ability to shield and hold onto the puck against several checking opponents, as well as his ability to "bore through" the opposing defense. He played in two Stanley Cup series for Vancouver, and was the star of the 1922 series, scoring 6 goals in 5 games.

Coming off that 1921–22 season, he returned east to rejoin the Toronto Arenas, now renamed the Toronto St. Patricks, and played four seasons on a line with right-winger Babe Dye. Adams was the team's leading scorer in 1925–26.

The next season, he joined the Ottawa Senators, finishing his playing career as it began, with a second Stanley Cup championship. His NHL stats included 83 goals, 32 assists in 173 games played.

Adams was inducted into the Hockey Hall of Fame in 1959 as a player.

== Coaching and managing career ==
Soon after his retirement, he became coach and general manager of the second-year Detroit Cougars at the suggestion of NHL president Frank Calder.

At first, the team struggled under his leadership, making the playoffs only two times in his first five years at the helm. A name change to the Detroit Falcons in 1930 did not improve the team's performance. Detroit's fortunes changed in 1932, when Chicago grain merchant James E. Norris bought the Falcons and renamed them the Detroit Red Wings. Norris gave the Red Wings the financing they needed to become an NHL power. Adams led the team to three Stanley Cups before stepping down in 1947 to concentrate on his duties as general manager. His coaching career tallied 413 wins, 390 losses, and 161 ties, including a 52–52–1 coaching record in the playoffs. Most of those wins came without a contract; when Norris bought the team he'd torn up Adams' contract and given him a year on his job on probation and a handshake. As it turned out, one year became 15 years as head coach and 31 as general manager; after 1932 he never signed a formal contract with the Red Wings. He was the winningest coach in Red Wings history until Mike Babcock passed him late in the 2013–14 season.

By 1947, Adams had built a farm system that produced Alex Delvecchio, Terry Sawchuk, Ted Lindsay, Red Kelly, Sid Abel, and most notably Gordie Howe. It was this core group of players that led the Red Wings to an NHL-record seven straight regular-season first-place finishes from 1948 to 1955; no NHL team before or since has finished with the league's best record more than three times in a row. Along the way, they won four more Cups, making Adams the only man to have his name on the Stanley Cup as a player, coach, and general manager. During this time, many inside and outside Detroit thought the Red Wings would rule the NHL for years to come.

Despite this, even at the peak of the Red Wings' dominance, Adams was known for being wary of letting his teams get complacent. He was not shy about orchestrating blockbuster trades to keep them on their toes—a philosophy which won him the nickname "Trader Jack." His impulse was slightly restrained after Norris died in 1952 and was succeeded by his daughter, Marguerite Norris. She and Adams never got along very well. While she could have summarily fired Adams since he was still without a contract, she did not do so.

However, in 1955, Marguerite lost an interfamily struggle and was forced to turn over control of the team to her younger brother, Bruce. With Bruce's full support, Adams resumed trading anew. Just days after Bruce took over the presidency, Adams traded away eight players from the 1955 champions. Years later, Howe wrote that Adams' reasoning for the trades still "def(ied) explanation," and argued that the trades opened the door for the Montreal Canadiens to win five Cups in a row (and nine in 14 years). Although the Red Wings remained competitive until the late 1960s, Howe believed the trades "sapped us of the firepower we needed to win another championship." The first, in 1956, came at the Red Wings' expense.

In 1963, Adams became founding president of the Central Hockey League, a post he held until his death at his desk on May 1, 1968.

=== Controversies ===
Adams had been involved in an incident in 1942, when he had an outburst due to his belief of biased penalty calling, which led to a fit of rage and ultimately a referee getting punched in game three of the 1942 Stanley Cup Final, thus becoming the first coach to be suspended in a Final.

In 1955, John Utendale became the first Black player to sign a contract directly with an NHL team, the Red Wings. Utendale practiced with the Red Wings but never played in an NHL game; instead, he played with the Edmonton Flyers, as they were the Red Wings' minor league affiliate. In 2006, Utendale's brother claimed that Adams had refused to give Utendale any playing time on the Red Wings because Adams objected to his relationship with a white woman whom Utendale later married.

In 1957, Adams traded Ted Lindsay to Chicago because of union-organizing efforts and had other players affiliated with the effort sent to the minors. As part of the union busting efforts, Adams spread fake rumours attributing Lindsay as criticizing his former teammates. Adams also showed a fake contract to Detroit reporters, claiming Lindsay was being paid $25,000 per year, when he was being paid $12,000.

The efforts resulted in most of the core of this team leaving town. Within two years, the Red Wings missed the playoffs for the first time since 1937-38, and only the fourth time since Adams' arrival. While they rebounded to make the playoffs two of the next three years, Adams was fired in 1963. His 36-year tenure as general manager is the longest in NHL history. His ouster from the Red Wings also ended 46 consecutive years at the major league level in hockey.

== Career statistics ==
=== Regular season and playoffs ===
			Regular season					Playoffs
Season	Team	League	GP	G	A	Pts	PIM	GP	G	A	Pts	PIM
1914–15	Fort William Maple Leafs	NHML	—	—	—	—	—	2	4	0	4	3
1914–15	Fort William Maple Leafs	Allan Cup	—	—	—	—	—	2	3	0	3	5
1915–16	Calumet Miners	NMHL	—	—	—	—	—	—	—	—	—	—
1916–17	Peterborough 247th	OHA Int	—	—	—	—	—	—	—	—	—	—
1917–18	Sarnia Sailors	OHA Sr	6	15	0	15	—	—	—	—	—	—
1917–18	Toronto Arenas	NHL	8	0	0	0	31	2	1	0	1	6
1918–19	Toronto Arenas	NHL	17	3	3	6	35	—	—	—	—	—
1919–20	Vancouver Millionaires	PCHA	22	9	6	15	18	2	0	0	0	0
1920–21	Vancouver Millionaires	PCHA	24	17	12	29	60	2	3	0	3	0
1921–22	Vancouver Millionaires	PCHA	24	26	4	30	24	2	1	0	1	0
1921–22	Vancouver Millionaires	West-P	—	—	—	—	—	2	0	0	0	12
1921–22	Vancouver Millionaires	St-Cup	—	—	—	—	—	5	6	1	7	18
1922–23	Toronto St. Patricks	NHL	23	19	9	28	64	—	—	—	—	—
1923–24	Toronto St. Patricks	NHL	22	14	4	18	51	—	—	—	—	—
1924–25	Toronto St. Patricks	NHL	27	21	10	31	67	2	1	0	1	7
1925–26	Toronto St. Patricks	NHL	36	21	5	26	52	—	—	—	—	—
1926–27	Ottawa Senators	NHL	40	5	1	6	66	6	0	0	0	0
NHL totals			173	83	32	115	366	10	2	0	2	13
PCHA totals			70	52	22	74	102	6	4	0	4	0
St-Cup totals			—	—	—	—	—	5	6	1	7	18

=== Coaching record ===
			Regular season					Playoffs
Season	Team	League	GC	W	L	T	Finish	GC	W	L	T	Result
1927–28	Detroit Cougars	NHL	44	19	19	6	4th, American	—	—	—	—	—
1928–29	Detroit Cougars	NHL	44	19	16	9	3rd, American	2	0	2	0	Lost in Quarterfinals
1929–30	Detroit Cougars	NHL	44	14	24	6	4th, American	—	—	—	—	—
1930–31	Detroit Falcons	NHL	44	16	21	7	4th, American	—	—	—	—	—
1931–32	Detroit Falcons	NHL	48	18	20	10	3rd, American	2	0	1	1	Lost in Quarterfinals
1932–33	Detroit Red Wings	NHL	48	25	15	8	2nd, American	4	2	2	0	Lost in Semifinals
1933–34	Detroit Red Wings	NHL	48	24	14	10	1st, American	9	4	5	0	Lost in Finals
1934–35	Detroit Red Wings	NHL	48	19	22	7	4th, American	—	—	—	—	—
1935–36	Detroit Red Wings	NHL	48	24	16	8	1st, American	7	6	1	0	Won Stanley Cup
1936–37	Detroit Red Wings	NHL	48	25	14	9	1st, American	10	6	4	0	Won Stanley Cup
1937–38	Detroit Red Wings	NHL	48	12	25	11	4th, American	—	—	—	—	—
1938–39	Detroit Red Wings	NHL	48	18	24	6	5th, NHL	6	3	3	0	Lost in Semifinals
1939–40	Detroit Red Wings	NHL	48	16	26	6	5th, NHL	5	2	3	0	Lost in Semifinals
1940–41	Detroit Red Wings	NHL	48	21	16	11	3rd, NHL	9	4	5	0	Lost in Finals
1941–42	Detroit Red Wings	NHL	48	19	25	4	5th, NHL	12	7	5	0	Lost in Finals
1942–43	Detroit Red Wings	NHL	50	25	14	11	1st, NHL	10	8	2	0	Won Stanley Cup
1943–44	Detroit Red Wings	NHL	50	26	18	6	2nd, NHL	5	1	4	0	Lost in Semifinals
1944–45	Detroit Red Wings	NHL	50	31	14	5	2nd, NHL	14	7	7	0	Lost in Finals
1945–46	Detroit Red Wings	NHL	50	20	20	10	4th, NHL	5	1	4	0	Lost in Semifinals
1946–47	Detroit Red Wings	NHL	60	22	27	11	4th, NHL	5	1	4	0	Lost in Semifinals
NHL totals			964	413	390	161	—	105	52	52	1	Three Stanley Cups

== Awards and achievements ==
- Won the Stanley Cup as a player with the Toronto Arenas in 1918 and with the Ottawa Senators in 1927.
- Won the Stanley Cup as General Manager and Head Coach of the Detroit Red Wings in 1936, 1937, and 1943.
- Won the Stanley Cup as General Manager of the Detroit Red Wings in 1950, 1952, 1954 and 1955.
- Named in his honour, the Jack Adams Award was introduced in 1974 and is awarded annually to the most outstanding coach in the National Hockey League.
- Was the first recipient of the Lester Patrick Trophy in 1966.
- Inducted into the Hockey Hall of Fame in 1959.
- First All-Star Team Coach in 1937 & 1943.
- Second All-Star Team Coach in 1945.

== See also ==
- List of Detroit Red Wings award winners
- List of Detroit Red Wings seasons

Preceded by Duke Keats	Head coach of the Detroit Red Wings; 1927–1947	Succeeded by Tommy Ivan
Preceded by Art Duncan	General manager of Detroit Red Wings; 1927–62	Succeeded by Sid Abel
