= Danny Wirtz =

American Businessman

- Born: Daniel Wirtz; 1977 (age 48–49)
- Education: Boston College
- Occupations: Chairman of the Chicago Blackhawks; President of Wirtz Corporation
- Spouse: Anne Wirtz
- Children: 2
- Family: Rocky Wirtz (father); Bill Wirtz (grandfather); Arthur Wirtz (great grandfather)

Daniel Wirtz (born 1977) is an American businessman who is the owner and chairman of the Wirtz Corporation, a Chicago-based holding company that owns the Chicago Blackhawks of the National Hockey League, oversees real estate properties across the Chicago area, and manages one of the largest liquor distribution companies in the United States. He is the son of Rocky Wirtz, and inherited the Wirtz Corporation from his father, who died in 2023. Wirtz is the fourth generation of the family to own the Blackhawks, and the sixth principal owner in franchise history.

== Early life ==
Wirtz grew up in Winnetka, Illinois. His father, Rocky Wirtz, his grandfather Bill, and great-grandfather Arthur were all entrepreneurs who owned the Chicago Blackhawks. Wirtz attended high school at Loyola Academy in Wilmette, Illinois. He was the starting goaltender for the school's varsity ice hockey team and won a state championship as a senior in 1995. He then attended Boston College. Upon graduation, Wirtz initially wished to pursue a career in music, entertainment, and marketing rather than working for the Wirtz Corporation. Wirtz is fan of Ministry, and would often send Al Jourgensen tickets to Blackhawks home games. Jourgensen hired Wirtz as his personal assistant, roadie, and guitar tech while the band was touring in 1999. The two remained close friends, with Jourgensen writing the song "Keys to City" as a gift to the Wirtz family.

== Executive career ==
Wirtz became more involved in his family's business following his grandfather's death in 2007. He assisted in operating many of Wirtz Corporation's holdings, including Breakthru Beverage, Wirtz Realty and banking interests. He eventually became vice president of the Blackhawks and alternate Governor to the NHL, while also serving as active advisor for the Blackhawks. Outside of the Wirtz Corporation, Wirtz co-founded Banner Collective, a production company, in 2013, and joined Varyer, an advertising agency, as a partner in 2018.

He became the interim president of the Blackhawks following the dismissal of John McDonough in April 2020. Wirtz became the chief executive officer of the Blackhawks in December 2020. Wirtz's official tenure as the Blackhawks CEO started on a tumultuous note. The organization was the subject of an internal investigation stemming from claims that a former video coach sexually abused a prospect during the 2010 Stanley Cup playoffs. The accuser, Kyle Beach, sued the Blackhawks organization for failing to properly handle his claims or file a formal police report. Many former players, coaches, and executives were interviewed. The investigation noted that neither Wirtz nor his father Rocky had any knowledge of the sexual assault at the time. However, the two remaining front office executives from the 2009 season, including Vice President of Hockey Operations Stan Bowman resigned, and the organization was fined $2 million by the NHL. On the ice, the Blackhawks started the 2021–22 NHL season with a 10-game losing streak, resulting in the dismissal of head coach Jeremy Colliton. The team did not recover and finished the season with the sixth-worse record in the NHL. The Blackhawks' home sellout streak came to an end on October 24, 2021 after 535 consecutive games due to the team's losing record and the COVID-19 pandemic.

Wirtz appointed Kyle Davidson as the team’s new general manager in 2022. Davidson initiated a full-scale roster turnaround, which saw the Blackhawks trading away players for draft picks and assets prior to the 2022–23 NHL season. The team also did not re-sign either Patrick Kane or Jonathan Toews, who were cornerstones of the previous dynasty. The team finished with the third-worst record in the NHL, but still won the NHL Lottery. The Blackhawks selected Connor Bedard, who was regarded as a "generational" prospect, with the first overall pick in the 2023 NHL entry draft. Wirtz extended Davidson's contract with a multi-year extension in April 2026.

Wirtz became the owner and chairman of the Wirtz Corporation in July 2023 following his father's death. In one of his first moves as chairman, he purchased the Chicago Steel of the USHL at the end of July 2023.

Wirtz was named co-chairman of the Breakthru Beverage Group on August 28, 2023.

== Personal life ==
Wirtz, and his wife, Anne, have two daughters: Rosemary and Juniper.

Sporting positions
Preceded by Rocky Wirtz	Chicago Blackhawks principal owner 2023–present	Incumbent
