= Rocky Wirtz =

American businessman (1952–2023)

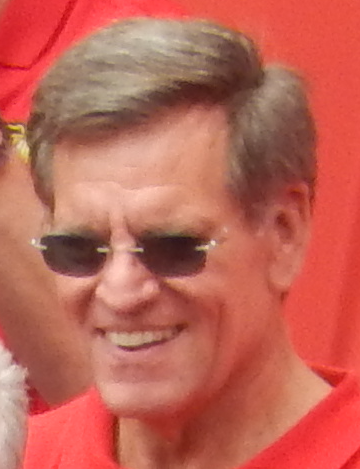
- Wirtz in June 2015
- Born: William Rockwell Wirtz; October 5, 1952; Chicago, Illinois, U.S.
- Died: July 25, 2023 (aged 70); Evanston, Illinois, U.S.
- Education: Northwestern University (B.S.)
- Occupations: Chairman of the Chicago Blackhawks; President of Wirtz Corporation; Co-chairman of Breakthru Beverage Group
- Spouses: Kathleen Wirtz (div. 2003) Marilyn Wirtz (m. 2003)
- Children: 3, including Danny Wirtz
- Family: Bill Wirtz (father); Arthur Wirtz (grandfather)

William Rockwell "Rocky" Wirtz (October 5, 1952 – July 25, 2023) was an American businessman. He was the principal owner and chairman of the Chicago Blackhawks of the National Hockey League. He was also president of the Blackhawks' parent company, the Wirtz Corporation, a diversified conglomerate headquartered in Chicago. Under Wirtz's leadership, the Chicago Blackhawks won three Stanley Cups between 2010 and 2015, reversing a period of declining fan interest and on-ice performance. He oversaw Wirtz Corporation's commercial and residential real estate companies, wine and spirits distributor Breakthru Beverage Group, an insurance company, and banks in Illinois and Florida. Wirtz was also half-owner of the Blackhawks' home arena, the United Center, along with Chicago Bulls owner Jerry Reinsdorf. He and Reinsdorf were co-chairmen of the arena's Executive Committee.

== Education ==
Wirtz graduated from North Shore Country Day School in Winnetka, Illinois in 1971. In 1975, he graduated from Northwestern University with a degree in Communications.

== Breakthru Beverage Group ==
Wirtz's grandfather Arthur Wirtz bought the family's first liquor distributorship in 1945. Wirtz grew up in the liquor business and assumed control of Wirtz Beverage Group in 2007. In recognition of his many contributions to and leadership in the beverage industry, the Wine and Spirits Wholesalers of America honored Wirtz with a Lifetime Leadership Award in 2014. In 2014, Wirtz Beverage expanded outside the U.S. announcing it was taking over as the exclusive Canadian distributor for Diageo beer, wine and spirits brands. The company was the first nationally established beverage alcohol broker in Canada.

In 2015, Wirtz merged the $2.5 billion alcohol-distribution business with Charmer Sunbelt Group to create Breakthru Beverage Group. Today, Breakthru is one of North America's leading distributors of wine, spirits and beer brands with more than $6 billion in annual revenue and operations throughout the U.S. and Canada. At the time of his death, Wirtz served as co-chairman of Breakthru Beverage Group. His son Danny Wirtz plays a large role in the Breakthru's executive leadership as Vice Chairman, also serving on the company's Board of Directors and Operating Committee.

== Ownership of the Blackhawks ==
Rocky Wirtz inherited the Blackhawks soon after the death of his father, William "Dollar Bill" Bill Wirtz, in 2007, becoming only the fifth principal owner in the franchise's 81-year history. His grandfather, Arthur Wirtz, bought a stake in the Blackhawks in 1950, acquiring outright ownership in 1966 and selling a stake to Bill, who inherited full ownership upon Arthur's death in 1983. Rocky's younger brother, Peter, served as Blackhawks executive vice president and supported many of Bill's long-standing policies, so many viewed him as Bill's heir apparent, while Rocky had no prior direct involvement with the team. Peter was immediately named principal owner upon Bill's passing. However, Peter was uninterested in taking the Blackhawks through a rebuild, and he decided to resign as vice president and instead allowed Rocky to assume control of the team, in return for Peter taking over another Wirtz Corp. business which was Bismarck Enterprises.

The Blackhawks franchise faced both financial challenges and on-ice struggles. Over the decade preceding Rocky Wirtz's leadership, the team incurred losses approaching $191 million and managed to qualify for the playoffs only once during that span. This period saw ESPN dubbing the Blackhawks as the worst franchise in professional sports. Wirtz recalls a dire financial predicament where the team found itself unable to cover its own payroll obligations prior to the 2007–08 NHL season. He was forced to borrow money from other companies within the Wirtz Corporation to keep the franchise afloat. Almost immediately after becoming the new owner, Wirtz altered many of his father's policies, which many fans saw as anachronistic. According to a source within the Hawks organization, Wirtz "believes in spending money to make money," in marked contrast to his father's frugal management style.

Wirtz hired John McDonough, who was presently serving as Chicago Cubs team president, to become the new president of the Blackhawks. Wirtz also retained Dale Tallon as Blackhawks general manager and Denis Savard as head coach, while Blackhawks senior vice president Bob Pulford was soon reassigned to Blackhawks liaison on NHL affairs. (Savard would be fired as head coach just four games into the 2008–09 season and replaced by Joel Quenneville.)

On October 22, 2007, Wirtz announced the team negotiated with Comcast SportsNet Chicago (now known as NBC Sports Chicago, of which he was part-owner) to televise home games. This was another break from his father's management style, where games were previously unavailable on television unless they were nationally televised. That season, they began to show seven home games, with Wirtz citing pre-existing agreements Comcast had with other programming as a reason why the remaining 2007–08 home schedule could not air locally.

Former star players Bobby Hull and Stan Mikita, who were not on good terms with the elder Wirtz, returned to the team in the role of "ambassadors". A big step showing this reconciliation was when the Blackhawks celebrated Hull and Mikita together at the United Center on March 7, 2008. Another bold change by Wirtz was lessening the use of the United Center's organ in favor of more prerecorded current music to attract new, younger fans. The break in tradition was initially met with skepticism but soon proved successful, as the team's new goal song, "Chelsea Dagger", became a song other teams loved to hate.

The Blackhawks enjoyed an immediate resurgence under the younger Wirtz's stewardship, thanks to McDonough's leadership in marketing, along with the young talent on the roster (drafted by general manager Tallon), which boosted the team's on-ice performance and reversed a long drought in popularity. This became evident when the team ranked 1st in the NHL for attendance in 2008–09 The team also hosted the Detroit Red Wings in the 2009 NHL Winter Classic at Wrigley Field that season. After missing the playoffs for six straight seasons (and seven of the last eight), the team's competitiveness improved dramatically in 2008-09. Having built the team around a core of Patrick Kane, Patrick Sharp, Jonathan Toews, Duncan Keith and Brent Seabrook, the Blackhawks recorded their first 100-point season in 16 years. They defeated the Calgary Flames and the Vancouver Canucks in the first two rounds before bowing out to the defending Stanley Cup champion Red Wings in the Western Conference final.

In the 2010 Stanley Cup playoffs, the Blackhawks defeated the Nashville Predators, Vancouver Canucks and San Jose Sharks to advance to their first Stanley Cup Final since 1992. They faced the Philadelphia Flyers in the Stanley Cup Final and won the Stanley Cup in six games on June 9, 2010. This was the first Stanley Cup for the Blackhawks since 1961, thus ending the second longest Stanley Cup drought in the history of the NHL.

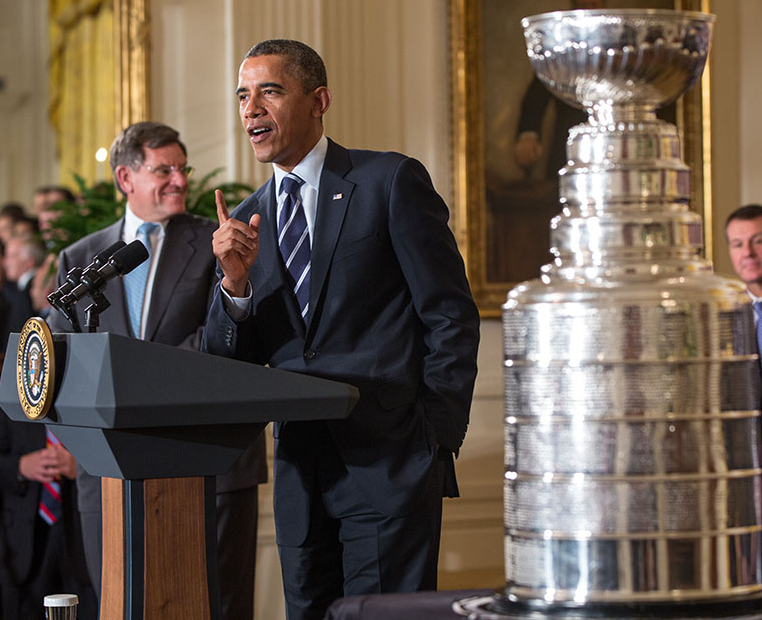
Wirtz and President Barack Obama in 2013.

In the 2013 Stanley Cup playoffs, the Blackhawks eliminated the Minnesota Wild, Detroit Red Wings, and 2012 Stanley Cup champion Los Angeles Kings to reach the Final. There they defeated the 2011 Stanley Cup Champion Boston Bruins in six games, giving the Blackhawks a second championship in four seasons. This marked the first game between Western and Eastern Conference teams all season due to the 2012–13 NHL lockout-shortened season. This also marked the first time since 1979 for an all Original Six Cup Final. Shortly after this championship, Wirtz and John McDonough, president and CEO of the Blackhawks, took out a full-page ad in the Boston Globe thanking the city of Boston for respect and sportsmanship during the Cup Final and praising their recovery from the Boston Marathon bombing.

In the 2015 Stanley Cup Playoffs, the Blackhawks eliminated the Nashville Predators, Minnesota Wild, and Anaheim Ducks to reach the Final. There, they defeated the Tampa Bay Lightning in six games, giving the Blackhawks a third championship in six seasons. It also allowed them to win the Cup on home ice for the first time since 1938.

Prior to the 2021–22 NHL season, former prospect Kyle Beach alleged he was sexually assaulted by a member of the Blackhawks' coaching staff in 2010. The Blackhawks conducted an internal investigation. Multiple executives and coaches on the team, including Stan Bowman, Joel Quenneville, and Al MacIsaac were aware of Beach's allegations in 2010, but failed to properly report the issue to the police. The report also states that Wirtz was not aware of the allegations at the time. The Blackhawks and Beach ultimately reached an out-of-court settlement. On February 2, 2022, Wirtz became agitated and responded harshly when asked about the incident during a town hall session with fans and reporters, for which he later apologized.

== Personal life and death ==
Wirtz and his wife Marilyn resided in the northern suburbs of Chicago. Wirtz had three children, including Danny, from a previous marriage, along with a stepdaughter from his second marriage and six grandchildren.

Wirtz died at a hospital in Evanston, Illinois, on July 25, 2023, at the age of 70.

== Awards and honors ==
- Three-time Stanley Cup Champion (as owner of the Chicago Blackhawks)
- 2014 Wine and Spirits of America Lifetime Achievement Award
- 2010 Chicago Innovation Awards Visionary Award

Sporting positions
Preceded by Bill Wirtz	Chicago Blackhawks principal owner 2007–2023	Succeeded by Danny Wirtz
