= Wirtz Corporation =

United States holding company

- Type: Private
- Founded: United States (1926)
- Headquarters: Chicago, Illinois, U.S.
- Key people: Danny Wirtz
- Website: wirtzcorp.com

Wirtz Corporation is an American holding company headquartered in Chicago. It was founded in 1926 by Arthur Wirtz as a family-owned corporation in charge of his real estate holdings. The company soon expanded into liquor distribution. It grew significantly throughout the 20th century by purchasing many competing liquor distributors, as well as the Chicago Blackhawks NHL team (becoming full owners in 1966), and the Chicago Bulls NBA team in 1972 (Wirtz Corporation sold the Bulls to Jerry Reinsdorf in 1985). It is part owner of the United Center arena in addition to owning banking and insurance interests.

After founder Arthur Wirtz's death in 1983, his son, William, took control of the corporation and ran it until his death in 2007. The company's next owner and CEO, (William's son) Rocky died in 2023 and was succeeded by his son Danny Wirtz.

== Subsidiaries ==
A partial list of subsidiaries of Wirtz Corporation:

- Banner Collective
- Benefit Services Group, Inc.
- Chicago Blackhawks
- Rockford IceHogs
- Chicago Steel
- First National Bank of South Miami
- First Security Trust and Savings Bank
- Ivanhoe Nursery
- United Center (ownership is shared with Jerry Reinsdorf)
- Breakthru Beverage Group (formerly known as Judge & Dolph until 2009; Wirtz Beverage Group then was the owner until the 2016 merger with Charmer Sunbelt)
- Wirtz Insurance Agency
- Wirtz Realty
