= James E. Norris =

American sports businessman

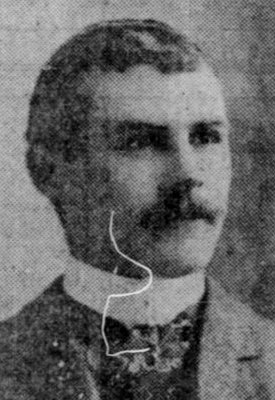
- Photo from the Chicago Tribune (Jan. 5, 1902)
- Born: December 10, 1879; Montreal, Quebec, Canada
- Died: December 4, 1952 (aged 72); Chicago, Illinois, US
- Occupations: Commodities dealer, sports team owner
- Board member of: Norris Grain Company; Detroit Red Wings; Chicago Black Hawks; Chicago Stadium; Madison Square Garden; New York Rangers
- Children: James D. Norris; Marguerite Norris; Bruce Norris
- Honors: Hockey Hall of Fame (1958); James Norris Memorial Trophy (est. 1953) Named in honour of Norris

James Edgar Norris (December 10, 1879 – December 4, 1952) was a Canadian-American businessman, operating companies in the grain and cattle industries, and owner of the Detroit Red Wings of the National Hockey League (NHL). He also had significant ownership interests in the Chicago Black Hawks and the New York Rangers. He is often referred to as James Norris Sr., to distinguish him from his son, James D. Norris. Norris is a member of the Hockey Hall of Fame, as are his sons James and Bruce Norris.

== Early life and career ==
Norris was born in Montreal, Quebec, Canada, the son of James Sylvester Norris (1849–1914) and Eleanor Waud. James Sylvester Norris was involved in a grain trading company, Norris and Carruthers. Norris lived in Montreal where the company owned an office and a warehouse, and Carruthers lived in Toronto, where it rented premises in the Board of Trade Building. His grandparents were Captain James Norris (1820–1891) and Sophrinia Neelon. Norris Place in St. Catharines, Ontario, is named after Captain James Norris, who was a sea captain, businessman, mayor of St Catharines and member of Parliament. His great-grand-parents were James Norris (1793–1839) and Nancy Ann Black. They left Scotland and settled in Caledon East, Peel, Upper Canada, with their family about the year 1834.

His first cousin once removed was Peter Blair Norris, named after his grandfather Peter Blair, of Belfountain, Ontario. His first cousin Captain Charles H. Norris settled in Maitland, Nova Scotia, and by 1852 owned Norris & Sanderson, a large shipbuilder on Nova Scotia's Shubenacadie River and one of the world's largest sailing fleets. James Norris was not directly related by blood to Dr. John Knox Blair (1873–1950), a Member of Parliament for the Wellington North Riding, Ontario. He was an accomplished athlete in his youth, playing hockey, squash and tennis. He was a defenceman (point) at McGill University, won the 1897 intermediate championship with the Montreal Hockey Club, and later played in three games in 1898 for the Montreal Hockey Club senior team.

Norris' family had amassed substantial wealth in the 19th century, owning mills and a fleet of ships, along with several tracts of land. His father moved Norris Grain Inc. to Chicago when Norris was 18 years old. Norris also moved to Chicago and became president of Norris Grain at the age of 28 in 1908. In the early 1900s he also played hockey in Chicago with the Kenwood Country Club and Chicago Wanderers teams. In business he began buying grain elevators in the 1910s and was the largest cash grain buyer in the world in the 1930s. He also ran Norris Cattle Company, which operated three of the largest cattle ranches in the United States. His net worth was said to be over $200 million by 1940. Norris became a US citizen in 1919.

== National Hockey League ==
When the NHL announced in 1926 that it would place a team in Chicago, Norris made a bid for the team, but lost to Frederic McLaughlin. Norris was one of the financial backers of the Chicago Stadium, which opened in March 1929. At that time, Norris and Stadium president Paddy Harmon had discussions with Frank Patrick about bringing another hockey team to Chicago, but under NHL rules, that would only be possible with McLaughlin's approval, which he would not give. McLaughlin found negotiations with Harmon and Norris for ice time at the Stadium to be difficult, but after Harmon was ousted as Stadium president, the Black Hawks and the Stadium came to an agreement during the 1929–30 season.

Later in 1930, Norris was one of the backers of the Chicago Shamrocks of the minor league American Hockey Association, which changed its name to the American Hockey League (no relation to the current circuit). The AHL was declared an "outlaw league" by NHL president Frank Calder, and in an attempt to separate Norris from the league, the NHL let Norris know that he would be welcomed as an NHL owner. Norris withdrew his support from the Shamrocks (the team disbanded after the 1931–32 season). In May 1932, Norris applied to the NHL for a team in St. Louis, but this was rejected by the league because of concerns over travel expenses for the other teams. Norris had an agreement to buy the financially struggling Ottawa Senators, and intended to move the team to Chicago or Toronto. McLaughlin said he would not allow a second team into Chicago, and Maple Leafs owner Conn Smythe rejected the idea of another team in his city.

In 1931, the Detroit Falcons and their arena, the Detroit Olympia, had been placed into receivership and were being managed by a creditors' committee. By the summer of 1932, it was being reported that the team might be sold to Norris. In the fall of 1932, the NHL formally approved Norris' bid to acquire the team from the receiver. He changed the team's name to the Detroit Red Wings. Norris also designed the team's current logo: a wing protruding from a wheel. The logo was adapted from the old Montreal Hockey Club logo (the team had been nicknamed the "Winged Wheelers") and was intended to curry favour with the automobile companies.

Norris quickly cleared away the debt left over from past years and gave the Red Wings the financial backing they needed to become one of the most powerful teams in the NHL. Under Norris' watch, the Red Wings won five Stanley Cups. He rarely saw his Red Wings play due to a heart condition. However, coach and general manager Jack Adams always called Norris after each game from the locker room.

When Frederic McLaughlin died in 1944, Norris helped longtime Black Hawks president Bill Tobin put together a syndicate that bought the team from the McLaughlin estate. It was generally understood, however, that Norris called the shots. He had bought Chicago Stadium in 1936, thus making him the Black Hawks' landlord. Earlier in the decade, he had bought enough stock in Madison Square Garden to become its largest stockholder, and while he did not buy majority control (he was forbidden from doing so by the NHL constitution), he had enough support from the board that he effectively controlled the New York Rangers as well. Norris's loans to the Boston Bruins during the 1930s gave him clout over that franchise as a creditor as well. Norris thus had outright control or significant influence over all four of the league's American teams.

== Death and legacy ==
Norris died on December 4, 1952, in Chicago and was buried in Mattituck, New York. Upon his death, the shipping company he financed, Upper Lakes Shipping, named a Great Lakes bulk carrier after him. The ship remained in service until it was scrapped in 2012–2013. He was elected to the Hockey Hall of Fame in 1958. His family controlled the Red Wings until 1982.

The James Norris Memorial Trophy, awarded to the top defenceman in the NHL, first awarded in 1954 was named in his honour. The league's former Norris Division, which existed from 1974 to 1993, was also named after him. There was also a James Norris Memorial Trophy in the International Hockey League which was awarded to the top goaltender.

== Awards ==
Stanley Cup Champion as President – 1936, 1937, 1943, 1950, 1952 with the Detroit Red Wings.
