= Bruce Norris (ice hockey) =

American businessman

Bruce Arthur Norris
- Born: February 19, 1924; Chicago, Illinois, U.S.
- Died: January 1, 1986 (aged 61); Stony Brook, New York, U.S.
- Occupation: Sports team owner
- Board member of: Detroit Red Wings
- Spouses: Naoma Donnelley; Patricia Anne Shephard; Armene Lamson Clark
- Parent: James E. Norris
- Relatives: James D. Norris; Marguerite Norris
- Awards: Hockey Hall of Fame (1969); Lester Patrick Trophy (1976)

Bruce Arthur Norris (February 19, 1924 – January 1, 1986) was owner of the Detroit Red Wings professional ice hockey team from 1952 to 1982. He was the son of James E. Norris and half-brother of James D. Norris. Members of the Norris family owned the Red Wings for almost fifty years before selling the franchise to Mike Ilitch in 1982.

== Personal life ==
Born in Chicago, Norris attended Yale University. After graduation, he became heavily involved in the Norris Grain Company and an avid cattle rancher based in rural Illinois. Bruce Norris served as an ensign with the United States Navy in the Pacific Theater during World War II. He married Naoma Donnelley on June 28, 1947. The couple divorced in 1949. He remarried in 1958 to Patricia Anne Shephard. That marriage ended in divorce and in 1967 he married the former Mrs. Armene Lamson Clark of Seattle. They divorced in 1970. Norris died at age 61 on January 1, 1986, at Stony Brook University Hospital in Stony Brook, Long Island, New York.

== Ice hockey ==
Norris attended Yale University and played defence on the varsity team, like his father, who also played ice hockey during his youth. In 1952, James E. Norris owned the Detroit Red Wings, a share of the Chicago Blackhawks, and mortgages on Madison Square Garden, where the New York Rangers played, and the Boston Garden, home of the Boston Bruins. After his death on December 4, 1952, the Norris interests were broken up. Bruce and his sister Marguerite Norris inherited the Red Wings and Marguerite was named president. After winning the Stanley Cup in 1955, Bruce bought out his sister's shares to become the sole owner of the Red Wings. Ultimately, the Red Wings never won the Stanley Cup with Bruce as the only owner. In 1957, Norris ordered the trade of Ted Lindsay from the Red Wings to Chicago because of Lindsay's efforts to form the National Hockey League Players' Association. His role in the union busting efforts are dramatized in the TV movie, Net Worth. He owned the team until 1982 when it was sold to Mike Ilitch.

Norris was elected the chairman of the National Hockey League's Board of Governors. Bruce Norris was inducted into the Hockey Hall of Fame in 1969, joining his father and brother. Bruce Norris' name was engraved on the Stanley Cup as a Vice President in 1952, 1954 and 1955. In 1976, Bruce Norris was awarded the Lester Patrick Trophy for outstanding service to hockey in the United States.

Preceded by James D. Norris	Chairman of the NHL Board of Governors; 1966–1968	Succeeded by William M. Jennings
Preceded by Bill Wirtz	Chairman of the NHL Board of Governors; 1972–1973	Succeeded by Bill Wirtz
