= Richard Riot =

Riot that occurred in Montreal, Quebec, Canada

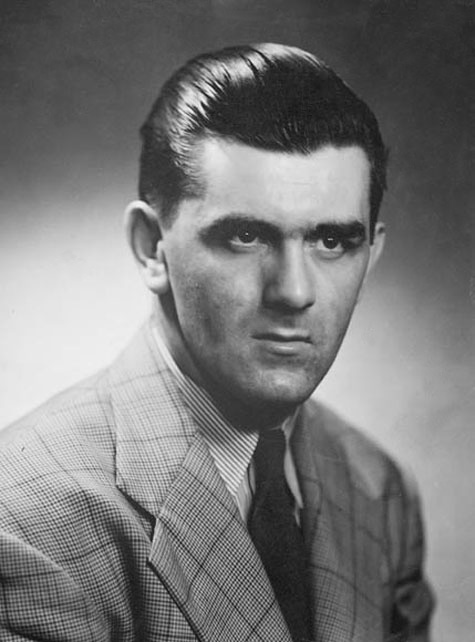
Maurice Richard, the player for whom the riot was named

The Richard Riot was a riot on March 17, 1955 (Saint Patrick's Day), in Montreal, Quebec, Canada. The riot was named after Maurice Richard, the star ice hockey player for the Montreal Canadiens of the National Hockey League (NHL). Following a violent altercation on March 13 in which Richard hit a linesman, NHL president Clarence Campbell suspended him for the remainder of the 1954–55 NHL season, including the playoffs. Montreal fans protested that the suspension was too severe; the team's largely Francophone fan base claimed the length of the suspension was motivated by Richard's French Canadian ethnicity. Outside of Montreal, however, the suspension was seen as justified and, if anything, too short.

On March 17, Campbell appeared at the Montreal Forum for the Canadiens' first game after Richard's suspension. His presence provoked a riot at the Forum that spilled into the streets. The riot caused an estimated $100,000 in property damage, thirty-seven injuries, and 100 arrests. Tensions eased after Richard made a personal plea accepting his punishment and promising to return the following year to help the team win the Stanley Cup. The incident likely cost Richard the 1954–55 scoring title (a feat Richard never achieved in his NHL career) and played a role in the off-season departure of longtime Canadiens head coach Dick Irvin. The dichotomy between Anglo and Francophone fans has been interpreted as a precursor or starting point to the Quiet Revolution.

== Background ==
Maurice Richard depicted as an unruly student forced to write lines reading "I will not call Mr. Campbell a dictator again." With Richard an icon for French Canadians, the cartoon illustrates the societal rift between English and French Canadians in the era.

Maurice Richard was the star player for the Montreal Canadiens, and it was common for opponents to provoke him during games. Teams reportedly sent players onto the ice to purposefully annoy him by yelling ethnic slurs, hooking, slashing, and holding him as much as possible. Throughout his career, Richard was fined and suspended several times for retaliatory assaults on players and officials, including a $250 fine for slapping a linesman in the face less than three months before the March 13, 1955 incident. Richard was considered the embodiment of French-Canadians and was a hero during a time when many perceived themselves as second-class citizens. He was revered when he fought the "damn English" during games. In his book, The Rocket: A Cultural History of Maurice Richard, Benoît Melançon compares Richard to Major League Baseball's Jackie Robinson by stating that both players represented the possibility for their minority groups to succeed in North America.

During the 1950s, Quebec's industries and natural resources were controlled primarily by English Canadians or Americans. French-speaking Quebecers were the lowest-paid ethnic group in Quebec, which resulted in a sense that control rested with the Anglophone minority. Because of this and other factors, there had been growing discontent in the years before the riot. In early 1954, Richard's teammate, Bernie Geoffrion, was suspended in a move seen as anti-Francophone. Following the suspension, Richard, who had a weekly column in the Samedi-Dimanche newspaper, called President Campbell a "dictator" in print. The League in turn forced Richard to retract his statement and discontinue his column. In his 1976 biography of Richard, Jean-Marie Pellerin wrote that his humiliation was shared by all Francophone Quebecers, who were sent running once more by the "English boot". This was reflected in a Montreal newspaper's editorial cartoon (pictured), which portrayed Richard as an unruly schoolboy made to write lines by Campbell, shown as the teacher; the cartoon had a deeper meaning as an example of the societal hierarchy that existed between English and French Canadians.

== Incident ==
On March 13, 1955, an on-ice episode sparked one of the worst incidents of hockey-related violence in history. On that date in Boston, Richard was part of a violent confrontation in a game between the Canadiens and their rival Boston Bruins. The Bruins' Hal Laycoe, who had previously played defence for the Canadiens, high-sticked Richard in the head during a Montreal power play. Richard required five stitches to close a cut that resulted from the high-stick. Referee Frank Udvari signaled a delayed penalty, but allowed play to continue because the Canadiens had possession of the puck. When the play ended, Richard skated up to Laycoe, who had dropped his stick and gloves in anticipation of a fight, and struck him in the face and shoulders with his stick. The linesmen attempted to restrain Richard, who repeatedly broke away from them to continue his attack on Laycoe, eventually breaking a stick over his opponent's body before linesman Cliff Thompson corralled him. Richard broke loose again and punched Thompson twice in the face, knocking him unconscious. Richard then left the ice with the Canadiens' trainer. According to Montreal Herald writer Vince Lunny, Richard's face resembled a "smashed tomato." Richard was given a match penalty and an automatic $100 fine, (Note: Equivalent to $1135 in 2024) and Laycoe a five-minute major penalty plus a ten-minute misconduct for the high stick.

Boston police attempted to arrest Richard in the dressing room after the game ended, but were turned back by Canadiens players who barred the door, preventing any arrest. Bruins management finally persuaded the officers to leave with a promise that the NHL would handle the issue. Richard was never arrested for the incident. He was instead sent to the hospital by team doctors after complaining of headaches and stomach pains.

The Laycoe incident was Richard's second altercation with an official that season, after having slapped a linesman in the face in Toronto the previous December, for which he was fined $250. Upon hearing the referee's report, league president Clarence Campbell ordered all parties to appear at a March 16 hearing at his office in Montreal.

== Hearing ==
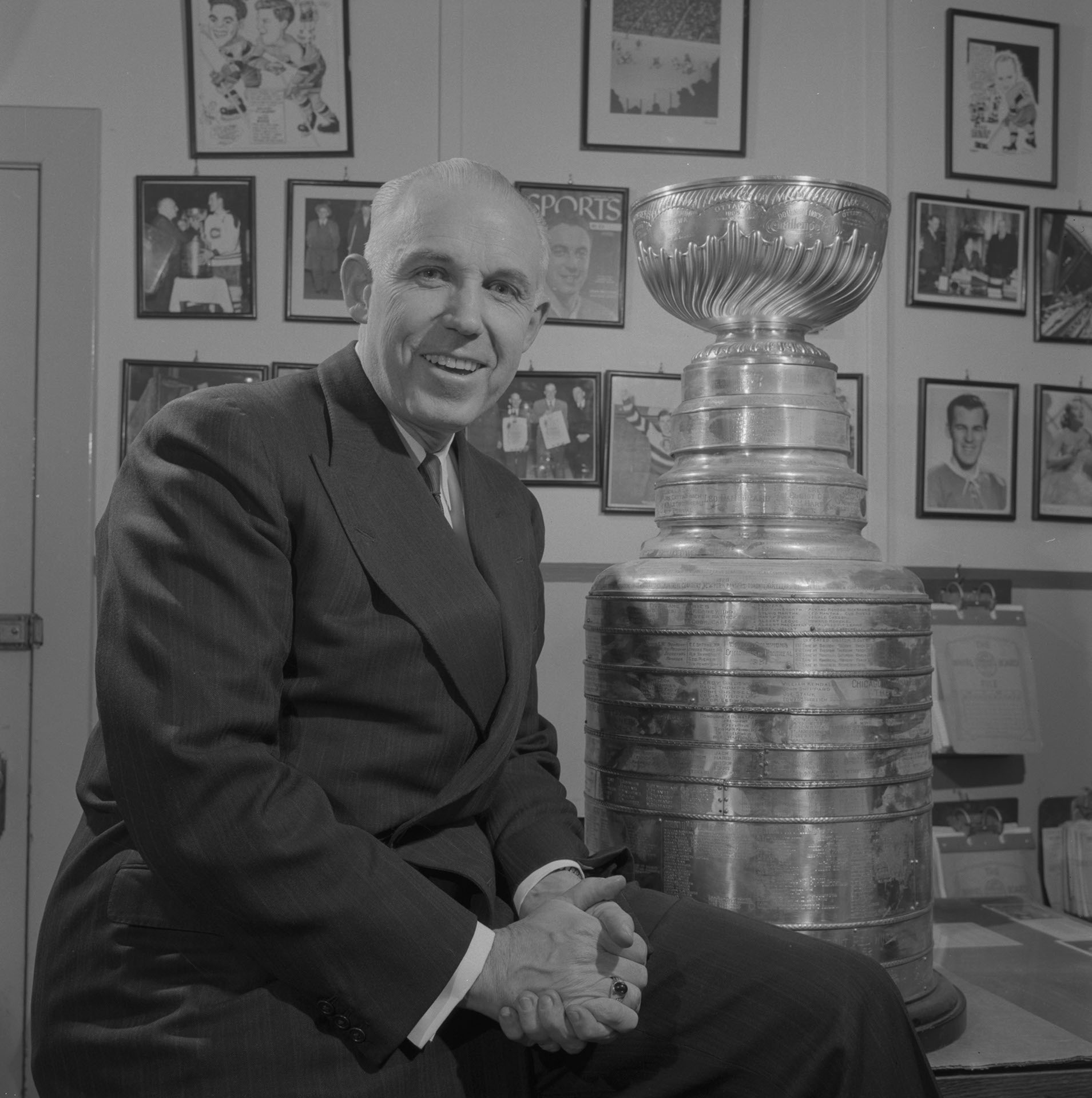
NHL President Clarence Campbell, shown in 1957 with the Stanley Cup

The game's on-ice officials, Richard, Laycoe, Montreal assistant general manager Ken Reardon, Boston general manager Lynn Patrick, Montreal coach Dick Irvin, and NHL referee-in-chief Carl Voss attended the March 16 hearing. In his defence, Richard contended that he was dazed and thought Thompson was one of Boston's players. He did not deny punching or attacking Laycoe.

After the hearing, Campbell issued a 1200-word statement to the press:

…I have no hesitation in coming to the conclusion that the attack on Laycoe was not only deliberate but persisted in the face of all authority and that the referee acted with proper judgment in awarding a match penalty. I am also satisfied that Richard did not strike linesman Thompson as a result of a mistake or accident as suggested … Assistance can also be obtained from an incident that occurred less than three months ago in which the pattern of conduct of Richard was almost identical, including his constant resort to the recovery of his stick to pursue his opponent, as well as flouting the authority of and striking officials. On the previous occasion he was fortunate that teammates and officials were more effective in preventing him from doing injury to anyone and the penalty was more lenient in consequence. At the time he was warned there must be no further incident … The time for probation or leniency is past. Whether this type of conduct is the product of temperamental instability or willful defiance of the authority in the games does not matter. It is a type of conduct which cannot be tolerated by any player—star or otherwise. Richard will be suspended from all games both league and playoff for the balance of the current season.

The suspension was the longest that Campbell issued during his thirty-one year tenure as league president. As there was no union at the time, Richard had no recourse to appeal. In Quebec, the punishment was widely considered to be unjust and unduly severe. Within minutes of the judgment's dispensation, the NHL head office (then in Montreal) was deluged with hundreds of calls from enraged fans, many of whom made death threats against Campbell.

However, the general feeling around the league was that the punishment could have been more severe. Detroit Red Wings general manager Jack Adams said that Campbell "could do no less" and "I thought he would be suspended until January 1 of next season." Red Wings forward Ted Lindsay, whom the league had disciplined earlier the same season for an incident in Toronto in which he attacked a Maple Leafs fan who had been threatening teammate Gordie Howe, expressed the stronger opinion that Richard was lucky not to get a life suspension: "In baseball, football or almost anything else that much would be almost automatic. I say they should have suspended him for life." Bruins president Walter A. Brown agreed with Adams, saying "That's the least they could do"; Bruins player Fleming Mackell said, "If they had thrown the book at Richard in 1947 when he cut Bill Ezinicki and Vic Lynn, it might have stopped him and made him an even greater hockey player because of it." Interest was high in the hockey world; the Detroit Free Press reported its switchboard was swamped with calls.

== Riot ==
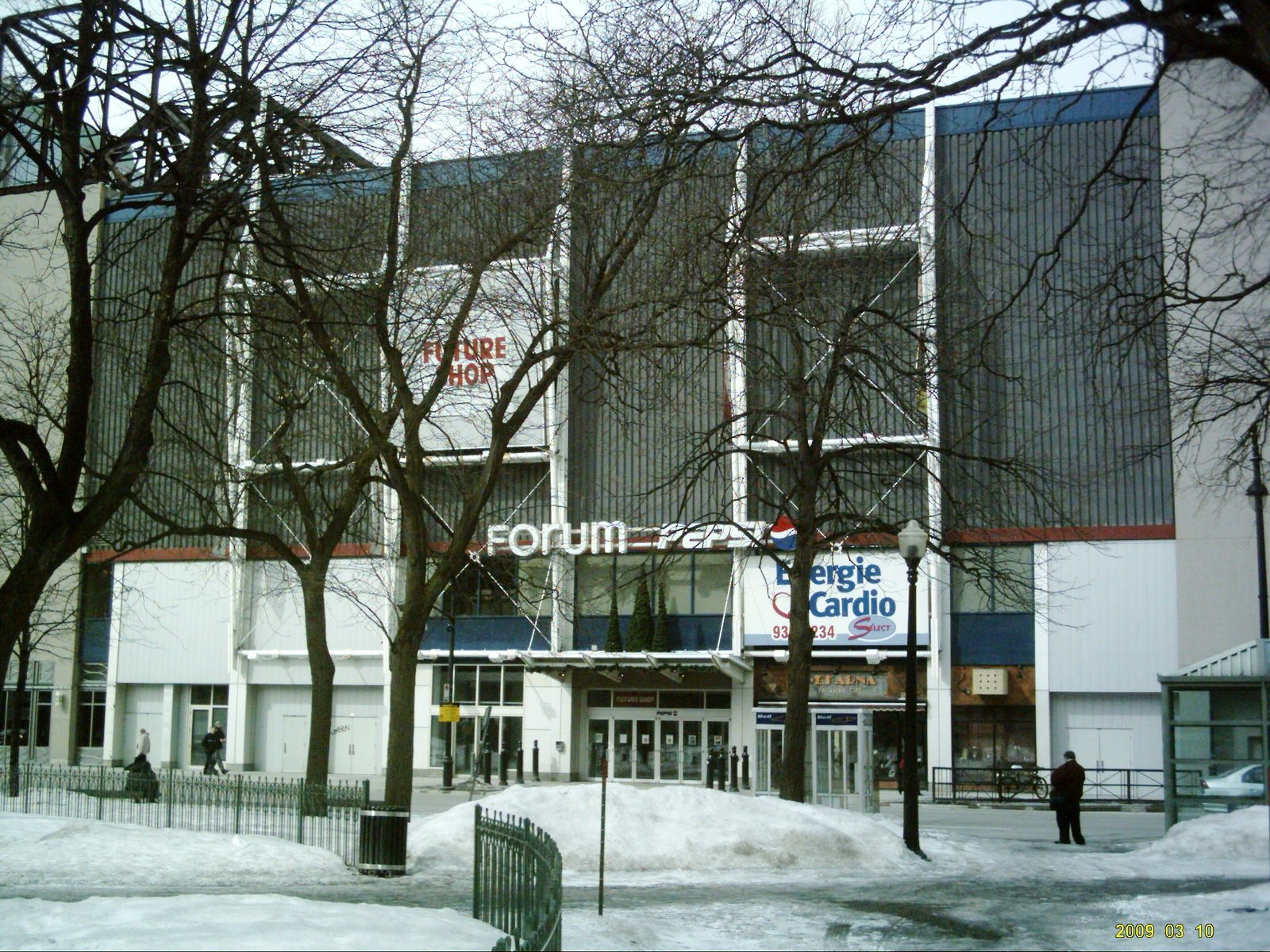
The Montreal Forum, site of the riot, as it looked in 2009

Public outrage from Montreal poured in about what residents felt was excessive punishment. Many Québécois regarded the suspension as the English majority further attempting to subjugate the French minority and an attempt to humiliate French Canadians by "excessively punishing their favorite player". Campbell, who received death threats, stated that he would not back down and announced his intention to attend the Canadiens' next home game against the Red Wings on March 17, despite advice that he not do so. Hundreds of demonstrators gathered in the Montreal Forum lobby two hours before the game. Attempts to "crash the gate" by these fans without tickets were denied by police. They then began to gather at Cabot Square across from the Forum. The crowd of demonstrators grew to 6,000. Some carried signs that denounced Campbell, and others had signs reading, among other things, "Vive Richard" (Long live Richard), "No Richard, no Cup", and "Our national sport destroyed". The crowd, originally described as "jovial", turned "surly" after police intervened at the ticket gate. After the mood turned foul, some members of the crowd began smashing windows and throwing ice chunks at passing streetcars.

The game against Detroit was a battle for first place, but the suspension unsettled the Canadiens. Goaltender Jacques Plante later recalled that the game seemed secondary, and players and officials were "casting worried glances at the sullen crowd". Likewise, Dick Irvin said later, "The people didn't care if we got licked 100–1 that night."

Midway through the first period, with Montreal already down 2–0, Campbell arrived with three secretaries from his office (one of whom he would later marry). The 15,000 spectators immediately started booing Campbell. Some fans began pelting him and his group with eggs, vegetables, and various debris for six straight minutes. At the end of the first period, Detroit had taken a 4–1 lead, and the barrage began again. Despite police and ushers' attempts to keep fans away from Campbell, one fan, pretending to be a friend of Campbell's, managed to elude security. As he approached, the fan extended his hand as if to shake Campbell's. When Campbell reached out to shake his hand, the fan slapped him. As Campbell reeled from the attack, the fan reached back and delivered a punch. Police dragged the attacker away while he attempted to kick the NHL president. Shortly after the fan attack, a tear gas bomb was set off inside the Forum, not far from Campbell's seat. Montreal Fire Chief Armand Pare mandated that the game be suspended for "the protection of the fans", and the Forum was evacuated. Following the evacuation, Campbell took refuge in the Forum clinic, where he met with Canadiens general manager Frank Selke. The two wrote a note to Adams declaring the Red Wings the winner of the game due to the Forum's ordered closure.

The departing crowd joined the demonstrators, and a riot ensued outside the Forum. Rioters were heard chanting "À bas Campbell" (Down with Campbell) and "Vive Richard" while they smashed windows, attacked bystanders, ignited newsstands, and overturned cars. More than fifty stores within a fifteen-block radius of the Forum were looted and vandalized. Twelve police officers and twenty-five civilians were injured. The riot continued well into the night, eventually ending at three A.M., and it left Montreal's Saint Catherine Street in shambles. Police estimated between forty-one and 100 individuals were arrested. Damage was estimated to be $100,000 ($1,164,539 in 2025 dollars) to the neighborhood and the Forum itself. One jewelry store alone estimated its losses at $7,000 ($81,518 in 2025 dollars).

Adams blamed Montreal officials after the game: "If they hadn't pampered Maurice Richard, built him up as a hero until he felt he was bigger than hockey itself, this wouldn't have happened."

The incident was national news in Canada. Reporters lined up to see both Campbell and Richard on March 18. Richard was reluctant to make a statement, fearing it could start another riot, but he eventually gave the following statement, both in French and English, over television to a national audience:

Because I always try so hard to win and had my troubles in Boston, I was suspended. At playoff time it hurts not be in the game with the boys. However, I want to do what is good for the people of Montreal and the team. So that no further harm will be done, I would like to ask everyone to get behind the team and to help the boys win from the New York Rangers and Detroit. I will take my punishment and come back next year to help the club and the younger players to win the Cup.

Campbell was unapologetic. He said that he considered it his duty as president to attend the game. Montreal mayor Jean Drapeau was livid at Campbell for attending, and he laid the blame for the riot on Campbell. A Montreal city councilor wanted Campbell arrested for inciting the riot. Years later, Canadiens player Jean Béliveau stated that, although he disagreed with Campbell's decision to attend the game, as well as feeling Campbell might have been using his appearance to make a statement, he concluded that Campbell may have felt that if he did not attend he could appear to be hiding. He also noted that Campbell's absence might not have made much of a difference.

== Aftermath ==
The suspension came when Richard was leading the NHL in scoring and the Canadiens were battling Detroit for first place. Richard's suspension also cost him the 1954–55 scoring title, the closest he ever came to winning it. When Richard's teammate Bernie Geoffrion surpassed Richard in scoring by one point on the last day of the regular season, the Canadiens' fans booed him.

The points from the forfeiture provided Detroit with the margin it needed to win first place overall and be guaranteed home-ice advantage throughout the Stanley Cup playoffs. That season, the Canadiens lost the 1955 Stanley Cup Final to Detroit in seven games, with the home team winning all seven games of a final for the first time. Montreal won the next five consecutive Stanley Cups, a record that still stands. Richard retired in 1960 after the Canadiens' fifth consecutive Stanley Cup.

The episode was a prelude to the off-season departure of coach Dick Irvin. Selke felt Irvin had riled Richard, thereby contributing to his "periodic eruptions". Selke offered Irvin a job for life with the Canadiens, as long as it was in a non-coaching capacity. Irvin refused Selke's offer and moved on to coach the Chicago Black Hawks, where he had begun his coaching career in 1930–31. He was replaced by former Canadiens player Toe Blake. Irvin coached only one more season before succumbing to bone cancer.

== Historical interpretation ==
The Richard Riot has taken on a significance greater than a mere sports riot in the decades since it happened. The sight of French Quebecers rioting over the perceived slight to a Quebec cultural icon like Richard led many commentators to say it was a significant factor in Quebec's Quiet Revolution of the 1960s. Furthermore, the cause of the riot has been suggested not to be as a result of the severity of the suspension; what mattered was that the NHL's anglophone president had suspended a Québécois player. French Canadians saw themselves as inherently disadvantaged within Canada and North America as a whole. Richard was seen as a hero by French Canadians, and almost a sort of a "revenge" against the anglophone establishment. The riot was a clear sign of rising ethnic tensions in Quebec. In an article published four days after the riot, journalist André Laurendeau was the first to suggest the riot was a sign of growing nationalism in Quebec. Entitled "On a tué mon frère Richard" (My brother Richard has been killed), Laurendeau suggested the riot "betrayed what lay behind the apparent indifference and long-held passiveness of French Canadians".

== See also ==
- List of incidents of civil unrest in Canada
- Bruins–Canadiens rivalry
- The Rocket (Maurice Richard) (film)
- 1954–55 Montreal Canadiens season
