= Clarence Campbell =

Canadian ice hockey executive and referee

Lieutenant-Colonel Clarence Campbell OBE QC
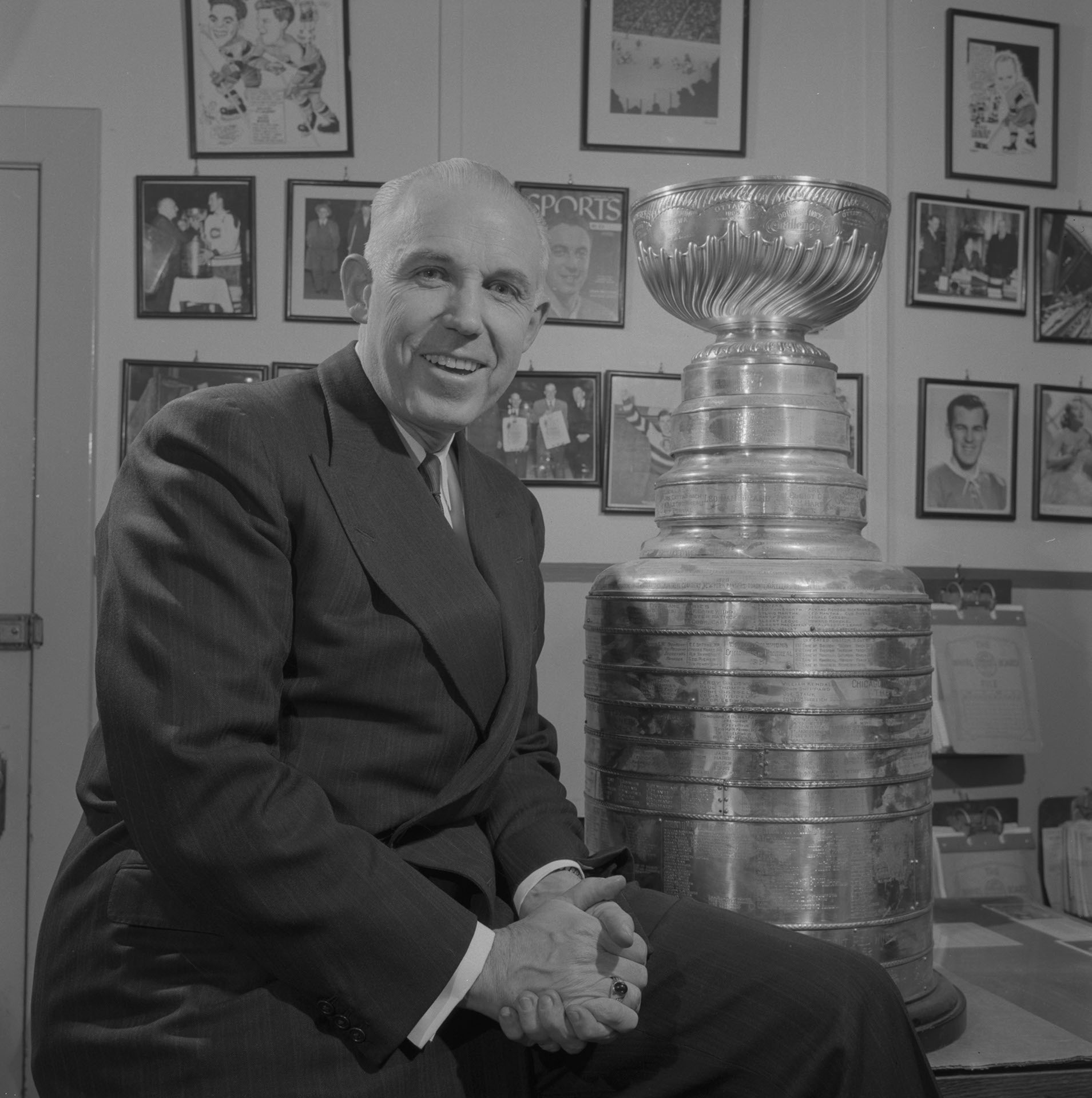
- Clarence Campbell poses with the Stanley Cup in 1957

3rd President of the National Hockey League
- In office 1946–1977
- Preceded by: Red Dutton
- Succeeded by: John Ziegler Jr.

Personal details
- Born: Clarence Sutherland Campbell; July 9, 1905 Fleming, Assiniboia District, NWT, Canada
- Died: June 24, 1984 (aged 78) Montreal, Quebec, Canada
- Resting place: National Field of Honour
- Education: University of Alberta; Oxford University
- Occupation: NHL executive

Clarence Sutherland Campbell OBE QC (July 9, 1905 – June 24, 1984) was a Canadian ice hockey executive and referee, and soldier. He refereed in the National Hockey League (NHL) during the 1930s, served in the Canadian Army during World War II, then served as the third president of the NHL from 1946 to 1977. His tenure as president included the Richard Riot and the 1967 NHL expansion. His career was recognized with induction into the Hockey Hall of Fame in 1966, and the naming of the Clarence S. Campbell Bowl for him.

== Biography ==
=== Early life and career ===
Born in Fleming, Assiniboia District, North-West Territories, Campbell attended high school at the Strathcona Collegiate Institute, now known as Old Scona Academic, Edmonton, Alberta, Canada. He graduated from the University of Alberta with a degree in law and arts in 1924 and was a Rhodes Scholar at Oxford University, where he played for the Oxford University Ice Hockey Club.

Campbell was an executive member of the Alberta Amateur Hockey Association in the 1930s, and was part of a Canadian Amateur Hockey Association committee in 1935 to study the definition of an amateur hockey player and updates needed.

Campbell worked as a referee in the NHL from 1933 until 1939. He officiated some historic games, such as the game in 1937 when the great Howie Morenz's career was ended when he broke his leg, an injury that eventually led to his death. Campbell also refereed a rough playoff game between the Montreal Maroons and the Boston Bruins in which Dit Clapper used his stick on a player. Angry at Clapper's actions, he called Clapper a profane name, which brought a powerful punch from the hardrock defenceman that knocked Campbell to the ice. Campbell, aware of his provocative action, then submitted a very lenient report on Clapper, and NHL president Frank Calder gave Clapper only a fine as a result.

Campbell made a controversial call in 1939 when refereeing a game involving the Toronto Maple Leafs when defenceman Red Horner was struck with a stick and Campbell doled out only a minor penalty, even though Horner was bleeding. Leafs owner Conn Smythe called for Campbell not to be rehired, and the league agreed.

=== The heir apparent ===
League president Frank Calder decided to let Campbell work in his office after his career as a referee, and it was becoming evident that the president was grooming a successor. But World War II broke out and Campbell enlisted in the Canadian Army. He rose to the rank of lieutenant colonel and was awarded the Order of the British Empire in 1945. At the end of the war he served with the No. 1 Canadian War Graves Investigation Unit. After the war he was appointed King's Counsel, and was one of the prosecutors at one of several trial courts of leading Nazis who were put on trial for crimes against humanity. It has been widely reported that Campbell participated in the Nuremberg Trials, but he said that was untrue in a Sports Illustrated article published in 1974.

Meanwhile, Calder had died, and with Campbell overseas, the NHL named Red Dutton president. Dutton did not want the job, however, and when Campbell returned to Canada in 1946, Dutton resigned and Campbell accepted the presidency. One of his first acts of authority was in 1948, when he expelled players Billy Taylor and Don Gallinger from the NHL for betting on games.

=== League president ===
As NHL President, Campbell is perhaps best remembered for suspending Montreal Canadiens superstar Maurice "Rocket" Richard for the remaining three games of the 1955 regular season and for the entirety of the playoffs. This decision came about as a result of Richard's actions during a March 13 game between the Canadiens and Boston Bruins; Richard had gotten into a vicious stick-swinging fight with the Bruins' Hal Laycoe, and when linesman Cliff Thompson restrained Richard, Laycoe punched Richard repeatedly. One of Richard's teammates knocked down Laycoe, allowing Richard to turn around and punch Thompson in the face. On March 17, Campbell attended a game at the Montreal Forum between the Canadiens and the Detroit Red Wings. Throughout the first period he was taunted and pelted with debris by outraged Montreal fans, who saw him as a prime example of the city's English-Canadian elite oppressing the French-Canadian majority. After a tear gas bomb was released in the arena, Campbell exited the building, the game was forfeited to the Red Wings, and the Forum was evacuated. A full-fledged riot ensued, in which 60 people were arrested and $500,000 in damage was done.

Campbell was elected to the Hockey Hall of Fame in 1966. He was instrumental in the 1967 expansion, which doubled the league in size, and often worked 18 hours a day in his office.

At the beginning of the league's Expansion Era in 1967–68, the NHL clubs decided to highlight the achievements of the league president by donating the Clarence S. Campbell Bowl in his honour. When the league realigned into two conferences and four divisions in 1974, it further honoured Campbell by naming one of the two conferences after him, and awarding the Campbell Bowl to the conference's regular-season (later playoff) champion. Although the Clarence Campbell Conference was renamed the Western Conference in 1993, the Campbell Bowl continues to be awarded to the conference's playoff champion.

=== Later life ===
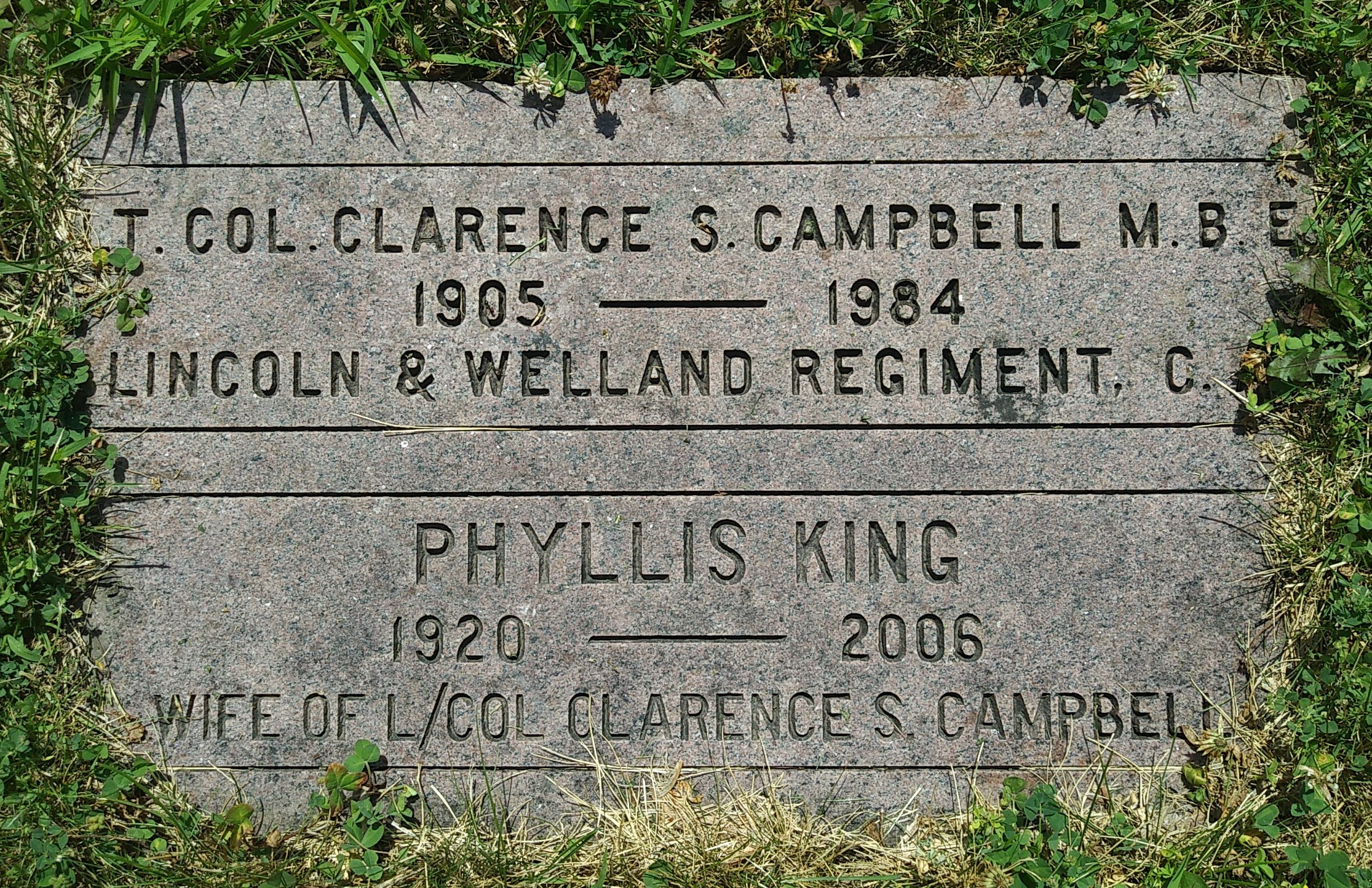
Campbell's grave marker

In 1976, Campbell was charged with bribing Senator Louis Giguère in the "Sky Shops" scandal. He was convicted, but the NHL paid his fine and he served no time because of his age. Campbell was a sick man by the time he retired as NHL president in 1977, succeeded by John Ziegler Jr. He spent the last years of his life plagued with respiratory ailments, and died on June 24, 1984. He was interred at the National Field of Honour in Pointe-Claire, Quebec.

Sporting positions
Preceded by Red Dutton	National Hockey League President; 1946–1977	Succeeded by John Ziegler
Preceded by Cooper Smeaton	Stanley Cup Trustee; 1979–1984	Succeeded by Willard Estey
