= Bruins–Canadiens rivalry =

National Hockey League rivalry

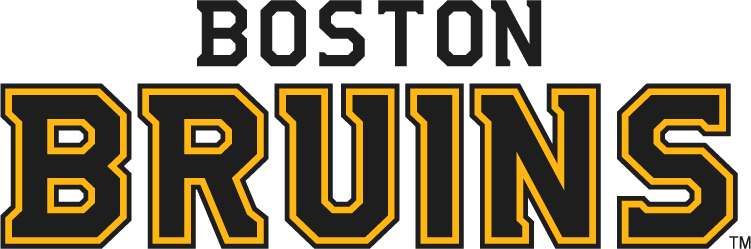
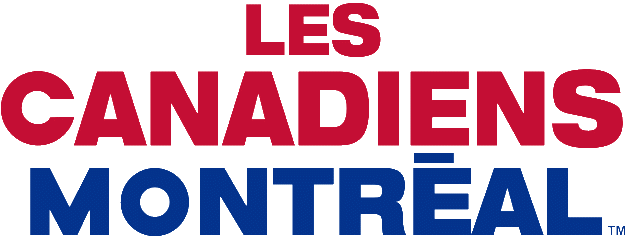
- Boston Bruins Montreal Canadiens
- First meeting: December 8, 1924
- Latest meeting: November 12, 2026
- Next meeting: January 6, 2027

Statistics
- Total meetings: 946
- All-time series: 474–357–103–12 (MTL)
- Regular season series: 368–286–103–12 (MTL)
- Postseason results: 106–71 (MTL)
- Largest victory: BOS 10–0 MTL; February 21, 1933
- Longest win streak: MTL W13
- Current win streak: MTL W2

Postseason history
- 1929 semifinals: Bruins won, 3–0; 1930 Stanley Cup Final: Canadiens won, 2–0; 1931 semifinals: Canadiens won, 3–2; 1943 semifinals: Bruins won, 4–1; 1946 Stanley Cup Final: Canadiens won, 4–1; 1947 semifinals: Canadiens won, 4–1; 1952 semifinals: Canadiens won, 4–3; 1953 Stanley Cup Final: Canadiens won, 4–1; 1954 semifinals: Canadiens won, 4–0; 1955 semifinals: Canadiens won, 4–1; 1957 Stanley Cup Final: Canadiens won, 4–1; 1958 Stanley Cup Final: Canadiens won, 4–2; 1968 quarterfinals: Canadiens won, 4–0; 1969 semifinals: Canadiens won, 4–2; 1971 quarterfinals: Canadiens won, 4–3; 1977 Stanley Cup Final: Canadiens won, 4–0; 1978 Stanley Cup Final: Canadiens won, 4–2; 1979 semifinals: Canadiens won, 4–3; 1984 division semifinals: Canadiens won, 3–0; 1985 division semifinals: Canadiens won, 3–2; 1986 division semifinals: Canadiens won, 3–0; 1987 division semifinals: Canadiens won, 4–0; 1988 division finals: Bruins won, 4–1; 1989 division finals: Canadiens won, 4–1; 1990 division finals: Bruins won, 4–1; 1991 division finals: Bruins won, 4–3; 1992 division finals: Bruins won, 4–0; 1994 conference quarterfinals: Bruins won, 4–3; 2002 conference quarterfinals: Canadiens won, 4–2; 2004 conference quarterfinals: Canadiens won, 4–3; 2008 conference quarterfinals: Canadiens won, 4–3; 2009 conference quarterfinals: Bruins won, 4–0; 2011 conference quarterfinals: Bruins won, 4–3; 2014 second round: Canadiens won, 4–3

The Bruins–Canadiens rivalry is a National Hockey League (NHL) rivalry between the Boston Bruins and Montreal Canadiens. It is considered "one of the greatest rivalries in sports." Retired Bruins' forward Bob Sweeney, who played for the Bruins between 1986–87 and 1991–92, once called it among the "top three rivalries in all of sports,... right up there with the... New York Yankees–Boston Red Sox." The two teams have played each other more times, in both regular season play and the Stanley Cup playoffs combined, than any other two teams in NHL history.

Through the conclusion of the 2025–26 season, the two teams have played each other a total of 945 times, with the Canadiens leading the overall series with 473 wins, 357 losses, 103 ties and 12 overtime losses. In the playoffs, the two teams have met in 34 series for a total of 177 games, the most in NHL history. Both teams also have faced each other nine times in game sevens, more than any other pair of opponents in NHL history.

== Origins ==
The first-ever professional ice hockey team in the United States to play in the National Hockey League, the Boston Bruins, started play on Monday, December 1, 1924, as one of two NHL "expansion teams" in its 1924–25 season, along with the Montreal Maroons – these two teams faced each other in the Bruins' inaugural NHL regular season game at their Boston Arena indoor hockey rink that night, with the Bruins winning by a 2–1 score on home ice, with a Canadian skater for the Bruins, Smokey Harris scoring the first-ever Bruins goal. However, only one week later, on December 8, the other Montreal hockey team, the veteran Canadiens were the opponents for the hometown Bruins, with the Canadiens coming from behind to defeat Boston in a 4–3 win.

For their first fourteen seasons, Boston did not have a particularly notable rivalry with either Montreal team – the Canadiens' owner had actually worked behind the scenes to admit the Maroons in the expectation they would be his team's most lucrative rival. After their second season, three more U.S. teams were added and the Bruins were placed in the newly formed American Division while the Canadiens entered the Canadian Division. The Boston-Montreal rivalry only truly began after the owners of the financially troubled Maroons, who had subsequently acquired the Canadiens, decided to contract their original franchise. The Maroons' 1938 demise left the Canadiens without a crosstown rival and left the league with only seven teams, thus compelling it to realign into a single division.

Boston and Montreal have been in the same division for the vast majority of seasons since that time. The first exception came in the 1970s when the Bruins were placed in the Adams Division and the Canadiens in the Norris Division, however the distinction was largely academic since during this time the league played used a balanced schedule and league-wide playoff format – when the league revamped its scheduling format and playoff format to better account for geography, conferences and divisions in 1981 the Canadiens were realigned to the Bruins' Adams Division. The 2020–21 season, in which the COVID-19 pandemic forced a temporary division realignment to avoid cross-border travel, caused Montreal to be placed in an all-Canadian "North" division and Boston in an Atlantic-Metro hybrid "East" division, and resulted in the first season of play in which the Canadiens and Bruins did not face each other.

Although the Canadiens–Toronto Maple Leafs rivalry is actually the oldest in the league dating back to the NHL's founding in 1917, the Toronto Maple Leafs were placed in the opposite conference between 1981 and 1998, limiting the number of Montreal–Toronto games per season during those years compared to that of Boston–Montreal.

== Post-War through the 1950s: Canadiens dominance ==
On April 8, 1952, Maurice "Rocket" Richard scored one of the most famous goals of all time, described variously as "the greatest in the history of the game" and "most beautiful in the history of the world." As blood dripped down his face after an earlier injury that gave him a concussion, he scored the series-winning goal of the 1952 Stanley Cup semifinals. Richard had left the game but returned to the bench in the third period, wearing a bandage. Richard, although somewhat dazed, jumped off the bench and drove to the net to score past a surprised Sugar Jim Henry, the Boston Bruins' goaltender. After the goal, showing tremendous respect and sportsmanship, a photograph was taken of Henry shaking hands with the bandaged Richard. It is considered to be one of the most famous images ever to be captured in sports.

=== 1955: Violence leads to Richard Riot ===
On March 13, 1955, an on-ice episode sparked one of the worst incidents of hockey-related violence in history. Maurice Richard was part of a violent confrontation in a game against the Bruins. Bruins defenceman Hal Laycoe, who had previously played for the Canadiens, high-sticked Richard in the head during a Montreal power play. Richard required five stitches to close a cut that resulted from the high-stick. Referee Frank Udvari signaled a delayed penalty, but allowed play to continue because the Canadiens had possession of the puck. When the play ended, Richard skated up to Laycoe, who had dropped his stick and gloves in anticipation of a fight, and struck him in the face and shoulders with his stick. The linesmen attempted to restrain Richard, who repeatedly broke away from them to continue his attack on Laycoe, eventually breaking a stick over his opponent's body before linesman Cliff Thompson corralled him. Richard broke loose again and punched Thompson twice in the face, knocking him unconscious. Richard then left the ice with the Canadiens' trainer. According to Montreal Herald writer Vince Lunny, Richard's face looked like a "smashed tomato." Richard was given a match penalty and an automatic $100 fine, while Laycoe received a five-minute major penalty and a ten-minute misconduct, which called for an automatic $25 fine, for the high stick.

Boston Police attempted to arrest Richard in the dressing room after the game ended, but were turned back by Canadiens players who barred the door, preventing any arrest. Richard was never arrested for the incident, as Bruins management finally persuaded the officers to leave with a promise that the NHL would handle the issue. He was instead sent to the hospital by team doctors after complaining of headaches and stomach pains.

It was Richard's second incident with an official that season. He had slapped a linesman in the face in Toronto the previous December and was fined $250. Upon hearing the referee's report, NHL President Clarence Campbell ordered all parties to appear at a March 16 hearing at his office in Montreal.

The March 16 hearing was attended by the on-ice officials, Richard, Laycoe, Montreal assistant general manager Ken Reardon, Boston general manager Lynn Patrick, Montreal head coach Dick Irvin and NHL referee-in-chief Carl Voss. In his defence, Richard contended that he was dazed and thought Thompson was one of Boston's players. He did not deny punching or attacking Laycoe. After the hearing, Campbell issued a 1,200-word statement to the press and said that "Richard will be suspended from all games both league and playoff for the balance of the current season." The suspension—the longest for an on-ice incident ever issued by Campbell in his 31 years as League president—was considered by many in Montreal to be unjust and severe. No sooner had the judgment been handed out than the NHL office (then located in Montreal) was deluged with hundreds of calls from enraged fans, many of whom made death threats to Campbell.

Campbell stood firm, however, and moreover announced that he would be attending the Canadiens' next home game against the Detroit Red Wings on March 17. Midway into the first period, Campbell arrived with his fiancée. Outraged Canadiens fans immediately began pelting them with eggs, vegetables and various debris, with more being thrown at him each time the Red Wings scored, building up a 4–1 lead on Montreal. The continuous pelting of various objects stopped when a tear gas bomb was set off inside the Forum not far from where Campbell was sitting. The Forum was ordered evacuated and Campbell ruled the game forfeited to the Red Wings.

That was the last straw for Canadiens fans, as a riot ensued outside the Forum, causing $500,000 in damage to the neighbourhood and the Forum itself. Hundreds of stores were looted and vandalized within a 15-block radius of the Forum. Twelve policemen and 25 civilians were injured. The riot continued well into the night, with police arresting people by the truckload. Local radio stations, which carried live coverage of the riot for over seven hours, had to be forced off the air. The riot was eventually over at 3 a.m., leaving Montreal's Rue Ste-Catherine in shambles.

The suspension came when Richard was leading the NHL in scoring and the Canadiens were battling the Detroit Red Wings for first place. Richard's suspension cost him the 1954–55 scoring title, the closest he ever came to winning it, and the Canadiens first place; on the final day of the season, the Canadiens lost to the Red Wings, 6–0. When Richard's teammate Bernie Geoffrion surpassed Richard in scoring on the last day of the regular season, the Canadiens' fans booed him.

Laycoe was booed by Canadiens' fans when the two teams met again in the Stanley Cup semifinals a few days afterward. A teammate, Ed Sandford recalled, "I drew Laycoe as my taxi teammate. When we got to the Forum, the police were waiting for us, and they escorted us into the building and to the dressing room past a bunch of angry fans. Then every time Laycoe came on the ice, the crowd booed him."

== 1960s and 1970s ==
The Bruins and Canadiens made up 16 of the possible 30 Stanley Cup Final appearances between 1965 and 1979. The Bruins went 2–3 and Canadiens went 10–1 in Final appearances. The two teams went head-to-head in the 1977 and 1978 Stanley Cup Final. The only Final that neither team appeared during this period was in 1975, which was a showdown between the Philadelphia Flyers and Buffalo Sabres. During this period, the Bruins and Canadiens reigned exclusively as Stanley Cup champions, except in 1967 when it was won by the Toronto Maple Leafs and the Philadelphia Flyers in 1974 and 1975.

=== 1965 to early 1970s: Dominance by Montreal over resurgent Boston ===
Both teams won Stanley Cups between 1968–1970 against the St. Louis Blues, who entered play as an expansion team in the 1967–68 season, all series against the Blues were four-game sweeps. The Canadiens beat the Blues in 1968 and 1969. The 1969 east semifinals was described by Sports Illustrated as "the most intriguing Stanley Cup hockey series in a decade" as the upcoming Stanley Cup Final against St. Louis would be considered a "formality." It pitted the defending champions Canadiens against the Bruins, an ascendent team since their 1967 trade with Chicago, with superstar defenceman Bobby Orr and regular season scoring champion Phil Esposito (who broke the century mark with 126 points). The Bruins had thought that they had outplayed their opponents in the series, however, it was the Habs who seemed to be in "the right place at the right time", as Jean Beliveau scored the winning goal in the second overtime period at Boston Garden to eliminate the Bruins in six games. In the 1969–70 season, the Canadiens narrowly missed the playoffs on the last day of the regular season, while the Bruins won their first Stanley Cup since 1941 on the famous overtime goal by Bobby Orr.

In 1970–71, the Bruins finished first in the League with Esposito and Orr shattering scoring records, but they lost in the first round to the Canadiens, who went on to win the Stanley Cup, in seven games. Late in the 1970–71 regular season, Montreal traded for veteran Frank Mahovlich and called up rookie goaltender Ken Dryden; the Bruins had not faced Dryden in the last two regular season meetings with the Habs and he would become a surprise playoff starter who made miraculous saves on the Bruins. Notably in game two, the Bruins blew a 5–1 lead and lost 7–5. Bobby Orr had a hat-trick at the Forum in game four to even the series. The Bruins dominated 7–3 in game five, but the Habs responded with an 8–3 victory in game six and a 4–2 win in game seven to knock out the heavily favoured Bruins. Sportswriter Cam Cole wrote of the series, "Where the whole world stopped for the Boston Bruins and Montreal Canadiens in the spring of 1971, and my heart was crushed by the evil Habs. If I didn't actually cry, I sure as hell felt like it. It seemed at least unfair, and possibly illegal, that anyone should be able to stop as magnificent a creature as Bobby Orr—let alone Phil Esposito and Johnny Bucyk and the rest—with some college-boy goalie [Ken Dryden]." Cole opined "there is no scale to measure the visceral abhorrence I harboured for the Canadiens, how badly I wanted Orr to win in '71." This ended a potential Bruins dynasty, though the Bruins would win the Stanley Cup the following year against the New York Rangers, who had earlier knocked out the Canadiens in the opening round of the playoffs.

=== Late 1970s: Bowman's Habs Dynasty vs Cherry's Lunch Pail Gang ===
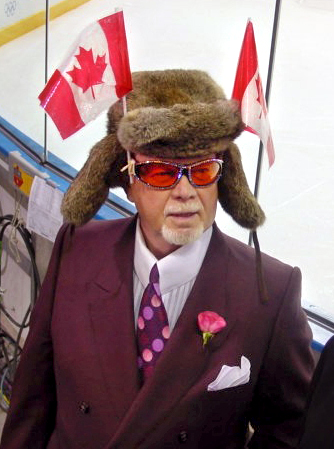
Don Cherry

The mid-1970s Montreal Canadiens, coached by Scotty Bowman, had become one of the most dominant NHL dynasties of all time, with Guy Lafleur succeeding an often-injured Bobby Orr as the game's preeminent superstar. Their main opponents in the 1976–79 playoffs were the Boston Bruins, who due to the departure of Orr and Phil Esposito were rebuilt into the "Lunch Pail Athletic Club", with head coach Don Cherry encouraging physical play and balance over brilliance. The 1977 Final saw the Habs sweep the Bruins in four games. During the 1978 Final, which the Habs won in six games, rough tactics were used against Lafleur, whose head was swathed in bandages at the end of the 1978 series after repeated high-sticking from Bruins players. Scotty Bowman later accused Bruins star defenceman Brad Park of being a "sneaky dirty player" during the 1978 Final.

The 1979 semifinals was a rough-and-tumble series which saw both sides win at home through the first six games, the Bruins took a lead in the closing fur minutes of game seven in Montreal on a goal by Rick Middleton. The Bruins were charged with a minor penalty for having seven players on the ice, Lafleur scored the tying goal on the ensuing power play, and Montreal's Yvon Lambert scored in overtime to win the series. The win allowed Montreal to advance to the Stanley Cup Final against the New York Rangers, who had been on a surprising postseason run, which they dominated to capture a fourth consecutive cup. Still reeling from the penalty and the loss, Bruins general manager Harry Sinden dismissed head coach Don Cherry, who went on to do Coach's Corner for Hockey Night in Canada, although it was noted that the two men already had a tense relationship for some time. Cherry said that he had blamed himself for the too many men penalty, saying, "It was my fault. The guy couldn't have heard me yell. I grabbed two other guys trying to go over the boards. That would have made eight on the ice. Might as well have let them go." The summer of 1979 would see a moment of peace in the rivalry. That summer, both teams were against the NHL merging with the WHA. Montreal's reason was because they were upset of having to share the province of Quebec with the Quebec Nordiques, and also because the Nordiques were owned by Carling O'Keefe (at the time, a major competitor of Canadiens owner Molson Breweries) while the Bruins were against the merger because they believed that the New England Whalers were "invading their territory". Ultimately, a massive boycott of Molson's in Canada compelled the Canadiens to consent to the merger, which allowed it to pass with the necessary supermajority. Although Boston ultimately cast one of the few dissenting votes against the merger, the Whalers were nevertheless forced to change their name to the Hartford Whalers.

== 1980s and 1990s: Division playoffs ==
The rivalry continued throughout the 1980s, mainly due to a division-oriented playoff format that seemed to pair the teams every year. Some memorable brawls took place, including one which continued into the tunnel between players who had been sent off.

During the period of the division-oriented playoff format (1981–82 to 1992–93), each Wales Conference final (except in 1982, which featured the New York Islanders and the Quebec Nordiques, in-province rivals of the Canadiens, and 1985, which featured the Philadelphia Flyers and the Nordiques) would feature either the Bruins or the Canadiens. Both teams made up four of the possible ten Final appearances from 1986 to 1990. The only final that neither team appeared during that time was 1987, which was a showdown between the Philadelphia Flyers and the Edmonton Oilers. However, the only time either team won during that period was in 1986, when the Canadiens beat the Calgary Flames to win their 23rd Stanley Cup.

=== Consecutive playoff meetings ===
From 1984 to 1992, the teams met in the playoffs each year. In 1984, the Bruins had won the Adams Division with a 49–25–6 record for 104 points, while the Canadiens, finished 35–40–5 for 75 points. The Canadiens, however, swept the Bruins in the division semifinals.

In 1985, the Canadiens had won the Adams Division with a 41–27–12 record for 94 points, while the Bruins, finished 36–34–10 for 82 points. The Canadiens defeated the Bruins in the division semifinals in five games. In 1986, the Canadiens finished second the Adams Division with a 40–33–7 record for 87 points, while the Bruins, finished one point behind with a record of 37–31–12 for 86 points. The Canadiens swept the Bruins in the division semifinals on their way to winning the Stanley Cup. In 1987, the Canadiens finished second the Adams Division with a 41–29–10 record for 92 points, while the Bruins, finished with a record of 39–34–7 for 85 points. The Canadiens swept the Bruins in the division semifinals for the second consecutive year.

In 1988, the Bruins won their first playoff series against the Canadiens in 45 years and after 19 attempts in the latter's Montreal Forum on the way to advancing to the Stanley Cup Final. However, they lost to the defending champions, the Edmonton Oilers, in the Final.

The next year, the Canadiens beat the Bruins on their way to the Final, where they lost to the Calgary Flames. In 1990, the Bruins, who won the Presidents' Trophy, finished off the Canadiens at Boston Garden for the first time since 1943. The Bruins advanced to the Stanley Cup Final where they again lost to the Edmonton Oilers, this time in five games. The Bruins won the 1991 and 1992 playoff match-ups against the Canadiens. Part of the Bruins' victories over the Canadiens was due in large part to goaltender Andy Moog, who was often referred to as a "Habs Killer." The 1991 series win for the Bruins was the first time they had won a game seven against the Canadiens, while the 1992 series was the first time since 1929 that the Bruins swept the Canadiens in the playoffs. It was only the fourth time that the Canadiens were swept in the playoffs, but the first since 1983 when the Buffalo Sabres swept them in a best-of-five series. It was also only the second time they were swept in a best-of-seven playoffs; the other time came in the 1952 Stanley Cup Final against the Detroit Red Wings. Ironically, Moog (who posted a 12–6 lifetime playoff record in head-to-head matchups against Patrick Roy) signed with the Canadiens for the 1997–98 season and helped the Habs to their first playoff series win since their championship season of 1993. Other heroes of the 1992 sweep were seldom-used winger Peter Douris, who contributed an overtime winner in game two and the clinching empty-netter in Game Four; and first-year head coach Rick Bowness, who got the Bruins to play a team game after captain Ray Bourque was lost during game two to an injury. "The Canadiens had had the Bruins' number in the playoffs for a long, long time", Bowness told author K. P. Wee in 2014, "and for the Bruins to not only beat the Canadiens but to sweep them--and sweep them on home ice--it meant so much to the loyal Bruins fans... It's a moment I'll never ever forget."

After meeting in the playoffs every year from 1984 to 1992, the rivalry took a year off in 1993. The reason was because the Bruins, who had won the Adams Division with 109 points, were swept in the opening round of the playoffs by the Buffalo Sabres on Brad May's famous "May Day" goal. With the Bruins and the Pittsburgh Penguins eliminated in the first and second rounds, respectively, it made the Canadiens' road to their 24th Stanley Cup much easier. After losing the first two games of their opening round series to the Quebec Nordiques, the Canadiens began an incredible run by winning 11 consecutive games, a record set by the Chicago Blackhawks and tied by Pittsburgh the year before, and also set a playoff record by winning 10 consecutive overtime games in a single postseason.

=== 1990s realignments ===
When the NHL realigned for the 1993–94 season, they renamed the conferences and divisions to reflect geography and changed the playoff format. The realignment solidified the rivalry between the Bruins and Canadiens. The Canadiens entered the playoffs seeded fifth in the Eastern Conference, the Bruins fourth. The Canadiens, however, were again knocked out in the first round by the Bruins, this time in seven games. That playoff series is best known for the Canadiens' Patrick Roy, after he came down with appendicitis and missed game three, convincing doctors to let him return for game four where he made 39 saves in his team's 5–2 victory.

With the NHL expanding to include the Nashville Predators, Atlanta Thrashers (current Winnipeg Jets), Columbus Blue Jackets and Minnesota Wild between the 1998–99 and 2000–01 seasons, the NHL realigned again, splitting each conference into three divisions of five teams each in 1998.

== 21st century ==
=== 2000–2010 ===
In 2000 and 2001, both teams missed the playoffs. The Canadiens defeated the Bruins in the first round of both the 2002 and the 2004 Stanley Cup playoffs, despite the Bruins being seeded higher. The Bruins had finished first in the Eastern Conference in 2002 and second in 2004. For the Canadiens, the 2002 victory was their first playoff series victory since 1998. During that series, the Canadiens used the power play to oust the Bruins. In 2004, the Bruins lost their first playoff series after having a 3–1 series lead, and it was the first time that the Canadiens had won a series in seven games after trailing 3–1.

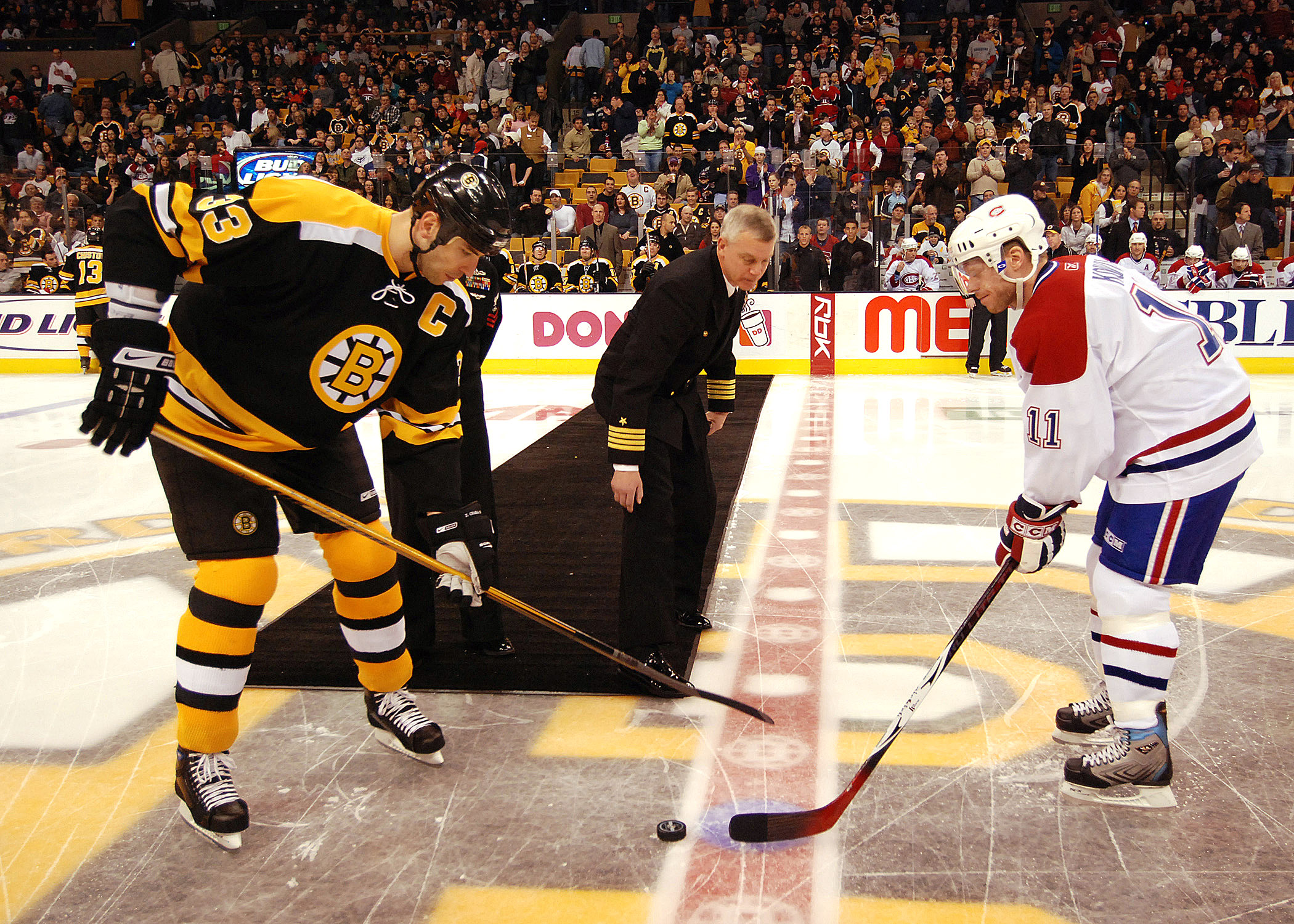
A ceremonial puck drop between Zdeno Chára and Saku Koivu before a Bruins–Canadiens game at the then-TD Banknorth Garden in March 2007

On June 22, 2007, during the off-season, former Canadiens coach Claude Julien was named head coach of the Bruins. Despite the new hiring, the Canadiens, for the first time in many years, did better than the Bruins in the 2007–08 regular season, winning all match-ups between the two teams. During a regular season game between the two teams, Steve Bégin, who would become a Bruin himself in the 2009–10 season, cross-checked centre Marc Savard from behind, resulting in a broken bone in Savard's back. The Canadiens met the Bruins in the first round of the 2008 playoffs after Montreal finished with the best regular season record in the Eastern Conference with 104 points, while Boston finished eighth with 94 points, which Montreal won in seven games on a shutout by goaltender Carey Price in game seven.

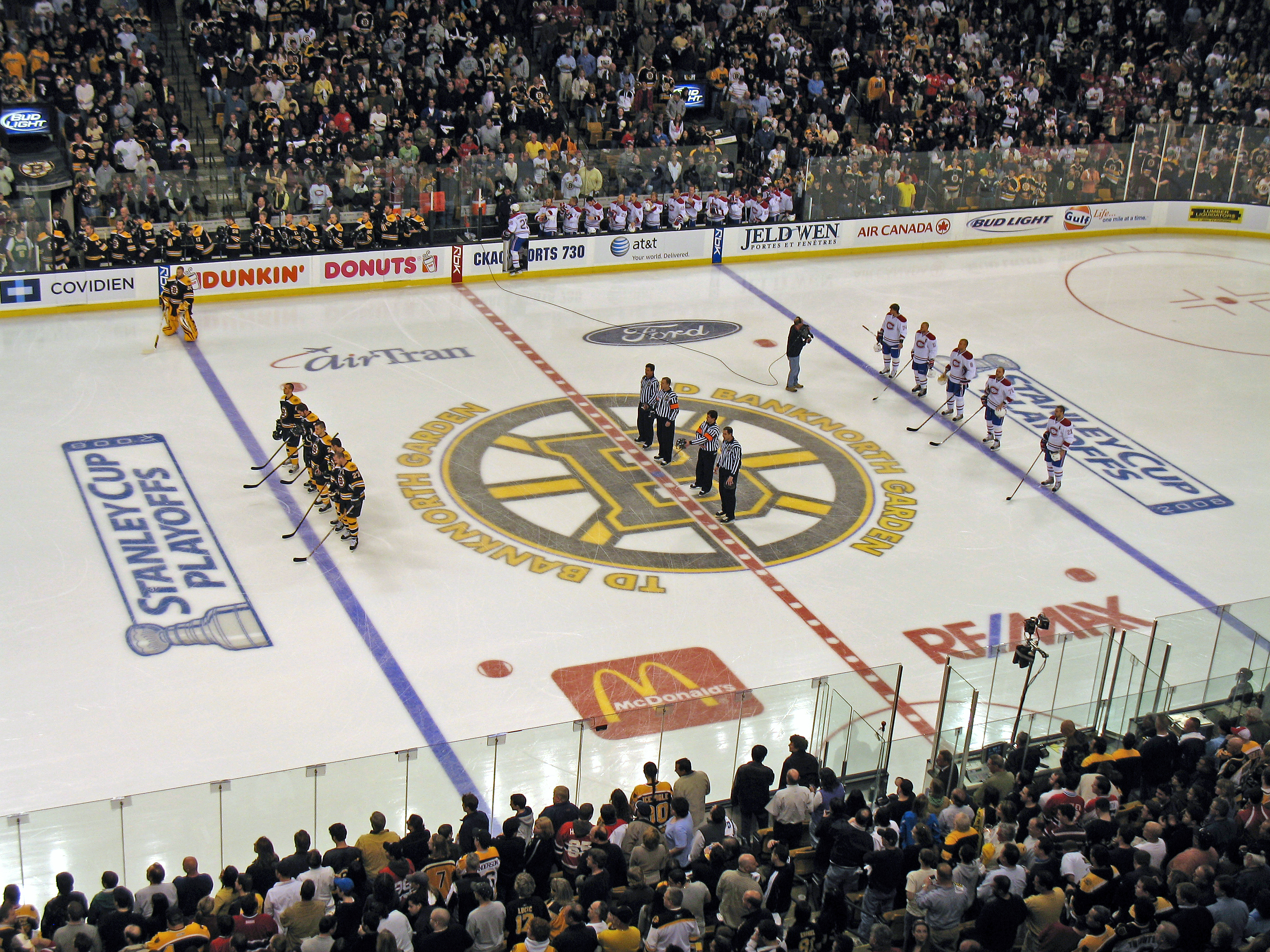
Players line up prior to game six of the 2008 playoffs between the Bruins and Canadiens at then-TD Banknorth Garden

The 2008–09 regular season, however, resulted in an almost complete reversal of the previous year's results for the two teams, as out of the six meetings of the Bruins and Canadiens, Boston gained 11 of 12 total points in those six games. The Bruins ended the regular season with the best record in the Eastern Conference with 116 points, while Montreal made it into the 2009 playoffs with 93 points, the two teams met for the 32nd time in their long history. Boston swept the series for first time since 1992 and for the first time in franchise history in the first round.

In the 2009–10 season, the second game between the two teams was played at the Bell Centre on December 4, 2009, the very date of the Canadiens' 100th anniversary as a hockey team, which resulted in a 5–1 home victory for the Canadiens. The Canadiens won five of six games from the Bruins during the regular season.

The Bruins finished the season seeded sixth in the Eastern Conference, while the Canadiens finished eighth. However, the two teams didn't meet in the playoffs. Although the Canadiens upset the defending champion Pittsburgh Penguins in seven games, the Bruins blew a 3–0 series lead against the Philadelphia Flyers following a serious injury to key Bruin centre David Krejčí in game three of the series. Like in 1979, the Bruins lost because of a "too many men" penalty. Had the Bruins won their series, the two teams would have met in the conference finals.

=== 2010–present ===
In the 2010–11 season, Montreal won four of six meetings.

One game on February 9, which the Bruins won 8–6, saw a brawl in which All-Star goaltenders Carey Price and Tim Thomas squared off during the second period, leaving the penalty boxes overflowing and the ice littered with the players' equipment. The game featured six fights, a goalie fight and a total of 187 penalty minutes issued.

On March 8, the Canadiens defeated the Bruins 4–1, but the game was marred when the Bruins' Zdeno Chára checked Habs' Max Pacioretty into the glass between the player's bench areas with 15.8 seconds left in the second period. His head hit one of the metal uprights and he was knocked unconscious. He was taken from the ice on a gurney with his head and neck stabilized. He was taken to hospital for observation, but the Canadiens said he was alert and had full use of his limbs. Chára, who received an interference major and a game misconduct, said of the hit, "I knew we were somewhere close to our bench but obviously that wasn't my intention to push him into the post. It's very unfortunate. In that situation everything's happening fast and even planning to do that, that's not my style to hurt somebody. I always play hard. I play physical but I never try to hurt anybody so I'm hoping he's OK." However, Chára was not suspended or fined for the hit. Canadiens general manager Pierre Gauthier said that "the NHL took its decision and it's not for us to express our opinion publicly." Pacioretty, however, was "disgusted" that the NHL did not suspend Chára for the hit. Montreal Police conducted a criminal investigation into the hit. On April 28, Pacioretty said that he had no ill will towards Chára for the injury that ended his season. He said, "I think he regrets what he did and I forgive him because he definitely made an effort to contact me and go out of his way to tell me how he felt. I respect him for that."

The two teams met for the final time during the season on March 24, with Bruins David Krejčí, Zdeno Chára, and Milan Lucic each scoring three assists in a 7–0 win over the Canadiens. Boston won the Northeast Division title on April 2, while Montreal finished the season seeded sixth following a 4–1 win over the Toronto Maple Leafs on April 9 and faced the Bruins in the first round of the 2011 Stanley Cup playoffs.

The Bruins–Canadiens first round meeting in the 2011 playoffs was the 33rd meeting of these teams in the postseason, by far the most frequent playoff series in NHL history. The Bruins dropped their first two games at home but managed to win the next two away to tie the series, finally advancing in seven games after Nathan Horton's second overtime goal of the series. The Bruins became the first team to win a seven-game playoff series without scoring a power play goal. In game four, Bruins defenceman Andrew Ference made an obscene gesture and as a result was fined $2,500 by the League. In game six, Milan Lucic of the Bruins received a five-minute major penalty and a game misconduct for boarding after hitting Habs defenceman Jaroslav Špaček head-first into the glass at centre ice at 4:37 in the second period. The Bruins made it all the way to the Final, beating the Vancouver Canucks to bring the sixth Stanley Cup victory in Bruins' history to Boston. It was the first time that Boston had beaten Montreal en route to winning the championship, since the Bruins' first Stanley Cup victory in 1929.

In the 2011–12 season, the Bruins won the Northeast Division as the Canadiens failed to qualify for the postseason. The Bruins won the season series, winning the final four games after losing the first two in a home-and-home series in the final week of October, outscoring them 13–11.

Following the Bruins' elimination by the Washington Capitals in the first round of the 2012 playoffs, events within the 2012 NHL entry draft saw the Bruins select the younger brother of Canadiens defenceman P. K. Subban, goaltender Malcolm Subban, as their first-round pick, prompting the chance for yet another aspect to the teams' rivalry in the future; they later signed Malcolm to a three-year, entry-level contract on September 6, 2012. The very first opportunity that the two brothers had to face each other was on September 16, 2013, in a pre-season match between the Bruins and Canadiens at Montreal's Bell Centre – Malcolm replaced Bruins rookie goaltender Chad Johnson at about 14 minutes into the game's second period and managed to stop every shot in the 31:49 he played in net en route to a 6–3 defeat of the Habs.

In the lockout-shortened 2012–13 season, both teams met only four times, with Montreal winning the final three games after losing the first meeting in Montreal on February 6. All games in that year's series were decided by one goal. Both teams battled for the Northeast Division title all season, before Montreal won the Division when the Bruins lost in a makeup game against the Ottawa Senators on April 28. However, the Canadiens lost decisively in the opening round to the Senators in five games, preventing a postseason meeting between the teams. The Bruins would fare well in the playoffs, advancing to the Stanley Cup Final but losing to the Chicago Blackhawks in six games.

The realignment that occurred in the off-season of 2013 kept the Bruins, Canadiens and Maple Leafs in the same division, now called the Atlantic Division. This maintained the rivalry between all three Original Six teams that has existed for the better part of a century. A fourth Original Six team, the Detroit Red Wings, also joined the Division. Due to the new scheduling rules, inter-division teams are to meet either four to five times a season; the Bruins and Canadiens met four times. Montreal won three of four—with one of the wins being a March 24 shootout at the TD Garden, ending a season-record 12 game Bruins winning streak—in their regular season quartet of matches.

The League restored division-oriented playoff format, which allowed the Bruins and Canadiens to play each other in the second round of the 2014 playoffs and 34th time overall, as the Canadiens swept the Tampa Bay Lightning, and the Bruins beat Detroit in five games. The Canadiens would go on to face and defeat the Presidents' Trophy-winning Bruins in the playoffs in seven games. Several controversial incidents, however, would cast a shadow over the hard-fought series. Following the Canadiens' 3–1 victory in game seven, their ninth game seven, Bruins forward Milan Lucic allegedly threatened Canadiens forward Dale Weise in the handshake-line, claiming, "I'm going to fucking kill you." Lucic's actions were widely criticized by commentators and fans. While Lucic did not make a full apology, he did acknowledge that his actions were "over the line" and were caused by his frustrations about losing the series.

In the 2014–15 season, Montreal won all four meetings between the teams, sweeping the season series between the two teams in regulation for the first time since the 2008–09 season. Milan Lucic was again involved in controversy in a separate incident during the season when he made an obscene gesture in a game at the Bell Centre, raising his middle finger to the crowd as he entered the penalty box. He was later fined $5,000 by the NHL and apologized for his "inexcusable" actions. The Bruins would go on to miss the playoffs for the first time since the 2006–07 season.

One anticipated event for the rivalry was set late in January 2015: following the Bruins' first-ever outdoor game in 2010, and the Canadiens' appearance in the 2003 and 2011 Heritage Classics, the Bruins and Canadiens faced each other in the 2016 Winter Classic outdoor hockey game which was held at Gillette Stadium in Foxborough. The Canadiens proceeded to win the game 5–1. The 732nd regular season encounter on December 9, 2015, between the Bruins and Canadiens at the Bell Centre, the last regular season game of the rivalry before the Winter Classic, broke a losing streak in the Bell Centre for the Bruins going back to May 8, 2014, in the second round of the 2014 playoffs when Tuukka Rask last played in goal for a 1–0 Bruins victory in the Bell Centre. The December 9, 2015, game there resulted in a 3–1 Bruins road victory with Rask in net, with new Bruins skater Landon Ferraro scoring the game-winning second Bruins goal.

The rivalry hit another high peak when head coach Claude Julien was fired by the Bruins on February 7, 2017, and was later named head coach of the Canadiens a week later on February 14. Claude Julien took over the duties of previous head coach Michel Therrien after he was fired from the Canadiens while assistant coach Bruce Cassidy simultaneously took over the duties of Julien. Though no regular season matchups remained between the two teams in the 2016–17 season, Cassidy's very slight changes in coaching, as opposed to Julien's, resulted in the Bruins achieving an 18–8–1 record through their remaining regular season games, to get the Bruins into the playoffs for the first time since 2014. This accomplishment made a playoff series between the Bruins and their former coach possible. This did not come to pass, however, as both teams lost in six games in a best-of-seven series to be eliminated in the first round of the 2017 Stanley Cup playoffs.

The Bruins won all four of their games against the Canadiens in the 2017–18 NHL season. Following the Canadiens missing the 2018 Stanley Cup playoffs as the sixth-place team in the Atlantic Division as the NHL regular season concluded, and the Atlantic Division's second-place Bruins losing in the second round to the Tampa Bay Lightning, one of Montreal's 2018 development camp invitees, the undrafted, 2018 Emile Bouchard Trophy-winning QMJHL defenceman, 21 year old Olivier Galipeau from Montreal, who completed his junior hockey career with the Acadie–Bathurst Titan (where Bruins star centre Patrice Bergeron also played his junior hockey in Canada), instead attended the Bruins' own development camp at the Warrior Ice Arena as an invitee, eventually signing with the AHL Providence Bruins farm team of the NHL Bruins, for the Providence team's upcoming season. Galipeau was on the "expected" roster due to skate at the Bruins' 2018–19 training camp at the Warrior Ice Arena. Following the first four games of the pre-season schedule, Galipeau was invited to the Providence Bruins training camp, as the main Boston team began cutting down their roster for the regular 2018–19 season.

During the 2020–21 NHL season, COVID-19 cross-border travel restrictions required the NHL to temporarily realign for the 2020–21 season, putting all seven Canadian teams into one division. The season was also abbreviated to a 56-game schedule and all games were played exclusively between division opponents; this eliminated any chance for the Bruins and Canadiens to face each other in regular season play for the first time since the Bruins' founding as an NHL team in December 1924. After the conclusion of the regular season, as the Bruins defeated the Washington Capitals four games to one in the first round, the Bruins fell to the New York Islanders four games to two in the second round. Conversely, after playoff series wins over the Toronto Maple Leafs, Winnipeg Jets and Vegas Golden Knights, the Canadiens made it to their first Stanley Cup Final since 1993, in the 2021 Stanley Cup Final where they were defeated by the Tampa Bay Lightning in five games.

== See also ==
- List of NHL rivalries
- Heated Rivalry, a TV series based on books featuring a fictionalised version of the Bruins–Canadiens rivalry
