= Frank Udvari =

Canadian ice hockey official (1924–2014)

Frank Joseph Udvari (January 2, 1924 – August 13, 2014) was an NHL referee from 1952-53 until 1965-66. Udvari was born in Militic, Yugoslavia and raised in Guelph, Ontario. He was the presiding referee during the game which initially sparked the Richard Riot, and he was an official in the 1966 Stanley Cup finals between Detroit and Montreal a game that went to overtime and scored by Henri Richard which is regarded as one of the most controversial Stanley Cup Finals goals.

Udvari was elected into the Hockey Hall of Fame in 1973. He died aged 90 in 2014 in London, Ontario.
