= Maurice Richard =

Canadian ice hockey player (1921–2000)

The Honourable PC CC OQ Maurice Richard
- Hockey Hall of Fame, 1961
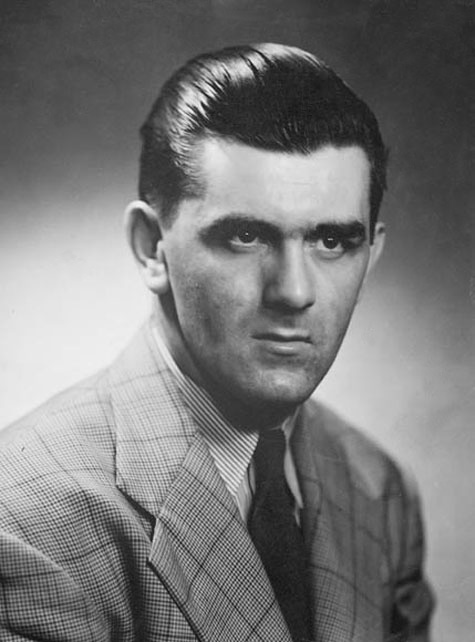
- Richard in the 1940s
- Born: August 4, 1921 Montreal, Quebec, Canada
- Died: May 27, 2000 (aged 78) Montreal, Quebec, Canada
- Height: 5 ft 10 in (178 cm)
- Weight: 180 lb (82 kg; 12 st 12 lb)
- Position: Right wing
- Shot: Left
- Played for: Montreal Canadiens
- Playing career: 1942–1960

Joseph Henri Maurice "Rocket" Richard (Note: /rɪˈʃɑːrd/ rish-ARD, French: [mɔʁis ʁiʃaʁ]) (August 4, 1921 – May 27, 2000) was a Canadian professional ice hockey player who played 18 seasons in the National Hockey League (NHL) for the Montreal Canadiens. He was the first player in NHL history to score 50 goals in one season, accomplishing the feat in 50 games in 1944–45, and the first to reach 500 career goals.

Richard retired in 1960 as the National Hockey League's all-time leader in goals with 544. He won the Hart Trophy as the NHL's most valuable player in 1947, played in 13 All-Star Games and was named to 14 post-season NHL All-Star teams, eight on the first team. Richard was named one of the 100 Greatest NHL Players in history in 2017. His younger brother Henri also played his entire career with the Canadiens, the two as teammates for Maurice's last five years. A centre nicknamed the "Pocket Rocket", Henri is enshrined alongside Maurice in the Hockey Hall of Fame.

Richard, Elmer Lach and Toe Blake formed the "Punch line", a high-scoring forward line of the 1940s. Richard was a member of eight Stanley Cup championship teams, including a league record five straight between 1956 and 1960; he was the team's captain for the last four. The Hall of Fame waived its five-year waiting period for eligibility and inducted Richard in 1961. In 1975 he was inducted into Canada's Sports Hall of Fame. The Canadiens retired his number, 9, in 1960, and in 1999 donated the Maurice "Rocket" Richard Trophy to the NHL, awarded annually to the league's regular season leading goal-scorer.

The oldest of eight children, Richard emerged from a poverty-stricken family during the Great Depression and was initially viewed as a fragile player. A string of injuries prevented him from joining the Canadian military during the Second World War. Intense, he was renowned for his physical and occasionally violent style of play. Richard was involved in a vicious on-ice incident late in the 1954–55 season during which he struck a linesman. NHL President Clarence Campbell suspended him for the remainder of the season and playoffs, which precipitated the Richard Riot in Montreal. The riot has taken on a mythical quality in the decades since and is often viewed as a precursor to Quebec's Quiet Revolution. Richard was a cultural icon among Quebec's francophone population; his legend is a primary motif in Roch Carrier's short story The Hockey Sweater, an emblematic work of Canadian culture.

In 1998, Richard was diagnosed with abdominal cancer and died from the disease two years later. He was the first non-politician to be honoured by the province of Quebec with a state funeral.

== Early life ==
Joseph Henri Maurice Richard was born August 4, 1921, in Montreal, Quebec. His father, Onésime Richard, was originally from the Gaspé region of Quebec, before moving to Montreal, where he married Maurice's mother, Alice Laramée. The couple settled in the neighbourhood of Nouveau-Bordeaux. Maurice was the oldest of eight children; he had three sisters: Georgette, Rollande and Marguerite; and four brothers: René, Jacques, Henri and Claude. Onésime was a carpenter by trade, and took a job with the Canadian Pacific Railway shortly after Maurice was born. The Richards struggled during the Great Depression; Onésime lost his job in 1930 and the family relied on government aid until he was re-hired by the railway around 1936.

Richard received his first pair of ice skates when he was four, and grew up skating on local rivers and a small backyard ice surface his father created. He did not play organized hockey until he was 14. Instead, Richard developed his skills playing shinny and "hog" – a game that required the puck carrier to keep the puck away from others for as long as possible. While he also played baseball and was a boxer, hockey was his passion. After he began playing in organized leagues, Richard joined several teams and used pseudonyms such as "Maurice Rochon" to circumvent rules that restricted players to one team. In one league, he led his team to three consecutive championships and scored 133 of his team's 144 goals in the 1938–39 season.

At 16, Richard dropped out of school to work with his father as a machinist. He enrolled in a technical school, intent on earning a trade certificate. At 18, Richard joined the Verdun Juniors, though as a rookie he saw little ice time in the regular season. He scored four goals in ten regular season games, and added six goals in four playoff games as Verdun won the provincial championship. He was promoted to the Montreal Canadiens' affiliate in the Quebec Senior Hockey League in 1940, but suffered a broken ankle in his first game after crashing into the boards and missed the remainder of the season. The injury also aborted his hopes of joining the Canadian military: he was called to a recruitment centre in mid-1941, but was deemed unfit for combat.

Off the ice, Richard was a quiet, unassuming youth who spoke little. He met his future wife Lucille Norchet when he was seventeen, and she was thirteen. She was the younger sister of one of his teammates at Bordeaux, and her bright, outgoing personality complemented Richard's reserved nature. Lucille proved adept at guiding him through trials and disappointments he experienced in both hockey and life. They were engaged when he was 20, and though her parents felt she was too young, married on September 12, 1942, when she was seventeen.

== Playing career ==
=== First Stanley Cup ===
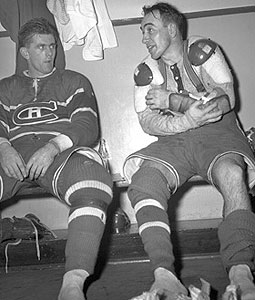
Richard (left) sits beside Toe Blake. The pair, along with Elmer Lach, comprised the "Punch line" in the 1940s.

Having recovered from his broken ankle in time for the 1941–42 season, Richard returned to the QSHL Canadiens, with whom he played 31 games and recorded 17 points before he was again injured. He suffered a broken wrist after becoming entangled with a defenceman and crashed into the net. Richard rejoined the team for the playoffs. The skills he demonstrated in the QSHL, combined with the NHL parent club's loss of players to the war and struggles to draw fans due to its poor record and a lack of francophone players, earned Richard a tryout with the Canadiens for the 1942–43 season. He signed a contract worth $3,500 for the year and, wearing sweater number 15, made his NHL debut with the team. Richard's first goal was against the New York Rangers on November 8, 1942.

Injury again sidelined Richard as his rookie season ended after only 16 games when he suffered a broken leg. The string of broken bones so early in his career left observers wondering if Richard was too fragile to play at the highest levels. He made a second attempt to enlist with the military but was again turned down after x-rays revealed that his bones had not healed properly; Richard's ankle was left permanently deformed, forcing him to alter his skating style. Humiliated by the rejection, he intensified his training and reported to Montreal's training camp for the 1943–44 season fully healthy. The arrival of his daughter Huguette prompted Richard to change his uniform to number 9 to match her birth weight of nine pounds.

Remaining healthy throughout the season, Richard appeared in 46 of Montreal's 50 games. He led the Canadiens with 32 goals and tallied 54 points, third-best in his team. His first full NHL season not only ended the criticism about his ability to play in the league, but established him as one of the best young players in the league. Coach Dick Irvin shifted him from left wing to right and put him on a forward line with Toe Blake and Elmer Lach. The trio, known as the "Punch line", formed a dominant scoring unit throughout the 1940s. The Canadiens lost only six games after October, and went on to win the franchise's first Stanley Cup championship in 13 years. Richard led the league with 12 playoff goals, including a five-goal effort against the Toronto Maple Leafs in a semi-final game. He tied Newsy Lalonde's NHL record for goals in one playoff game (equalled by three players since), which resulted in his being named first, second and third star of the game, as chosen by journalist Charles Mayer. Richard was named a second team All-Star following the season. It was the first of 14 consecutive years he was named a league all-star.

=== 50 goals in 50 games ===
The 1944–45 NHL season was a record-setting one for Richard. He first set a new mark for points in one game when he made five goals and three assists in a 9–1 victory over the Detroit Red Wings on December 28, 1944; his eight points broke the previous record of seven held by three players, and stood for 32 years until surpassed in 1976 by Darryl Sittler. Richard achieved the feat despite arriving for the game exhausted from moving into his new home that afternoon. He continued scoring at an unprecedented rate, and by February 1945 was approaching Joe Malone's 27-year-old NHL record, set in 1918, of 44 goals in one season. Richard broke the record on February 25, 1945, in a 5–2 victory over Toronto. Malone was on hand to present Richard with the puck used to score the 45th goal.

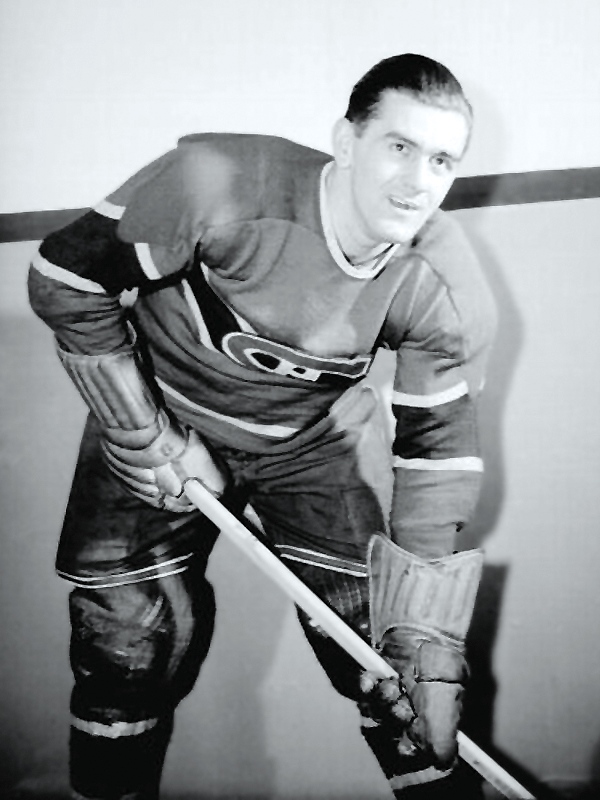
Richard in 1945. His feat of scoring 50 goals in 50 games was unmatched until Mike Bossy in 1980–81.

As Richard approached 50 goals for the season, opposition players resorted to increasingly violent efforts to prevent him from scoring. He had to fight past slashes, hooks, and even players who draped themselves across his back. Richard went eight games without scoring and began Montreal's final regular season game, March 18, on the road against the Boston Bruins with 49 goals. He finally reached the milestone by scoring with 2:15 remaining in the game, a 4–2 Montreal win. He became the first player to score 50 goals, a record that would stand until the 1960–61 season, when fellow Canadien, Bernie "Boom Boom" Geoffrion scored 50 goals in 64 regular season games. Richard's mark was not surpassed until Bobby Hull scored 54 goals in 65 games while playing for the Chicago Blackhawks during the 1965–66 season. His mark of 50 goals in 50 games also became a standard that remains one of the most celebrated achievements in NHL history, unmatched until 36 years later when Mike Bossy did it in 1981 – the first of only four players to match Richard's 50-in-50, in the more than 70 years since Richard set the mark. Richard finished the season with 73 points, seven behind Lach and six ahead of Blake, as the Punch line finished first, second and third in league scoring. Richard finished second in the voting for the Hart Trophy as the league's most valuable player, behind Lach.

Richard's critics argued that his scoring record was the result of talent dilution brought about by the war; when many players returned in 1945–46, he won his second Stanley Cup with Montreal, but his goal output was nearly halved to 27. Richard again reached lofty scoring totals in 1946–47, leading the league with 45 goals in a 60-game season and winning the Hart Trophy as the league's most valuable player for the only time of his career. He finished second or third in the Hart Trophy voting a further five times in his career. Opponents continued their attempts to drive Richard to anger or frustration, as they had learned he could be goaded into taking himself out of the game by violently retaliating and fighting. One such incident occurred in the 1947 Stanley Cup Final when Richard received a match penalty for striking Toronto's Bill Ezinicki over the head with his stick in a game two loss. Richard was suspended for the third game of the series, which the Maple Leafs won.

As the reigning most valuable player, Richard sought a pay raise prior to the 1947–48 season. General manager Frank Selke refused, even after Richard and team captain Émile Bouchard both sat out the Canadiens' preseason before capitulating and returning to the team when the season began. The Punch line was broken up after Blake suffered a career-ending leg injury. Richard's season also ended early as he missed the final games of the season due to a knee injury. He finished second in team scoring with 53 points in 53 games, but Montreal missed the playoffs. After recording only 38 points in 1948–49, Richard posted a 65-point campaign the next season and his 43 goals led the NHL for the third time. In 1950–51, Richard scored 42 goals, including his 271st career goal, passing Aurel Joliat as the Canadiens' all-time goal leader.

=== All-time scoring leader ===
A bloodied Richard shakes hands with Boston's goaltender Jim Henry after the Canadiens' 1952 Stanley Cup semi-finals win.

Richard missed over 20 games of the 1951–52 season due to injury, but overcame another ailment in the playoffs. In the seventh and deciding game of the semi-final against Boston, Richard was checked by Leo Labine and briefly knocked unconscious after he fell and struck his head on Bill Quackenbush's knee. Though dazed, Richard returned to the game late in the third period after a large cut above his eye was stitched up. Canadiens coach Dick Irvin sent Richard back onto the ice in the final minutes of the contest, despite knowing Richard had suffered a concussion. Richard scored the winning goal in a 2–1 victory that sent Montreal to the 1952 Stanley Cup Final. Following the game, a bloodied and still disoriented Richard was photographed shaking the hand of Boston goaltender Jim Henry, who was also showing symptoms of injuries from the series and who appeared to be bowing to Richard following the Montreal player's "unconscious goal". The photograph by Roger St. Jean is among the most famous images of Richard and one of the most iconic images in the league's history. In the final, Montreal lost to Detroit in four straight games.

The 1952–53 season began with Richard in close pursuit of Nels Stewart's all-time NHL record of 324 goals. Richard tied the record in Toronto on October 29, 1952, by scoring two goals against the Maple Leafs; his achievement earned a rousing ovation from Montreal's rival fans. He failed to score in his following three games as frenzied fans followed each contest in anticipation of the record-breaking marker. In his fourth try, a November 8 game against Chicago, Richard scored his 325th goal at the 10:01 mark of the second period. According to the Montreal Gazette, the ovation Richard received from his fans "shook the rafters" of the Montreal Forum. He finished the season with team-leading totals of 61 points and 28 goals – becoming the first player in NHL history to score at least 20 goals in his first ten full seasons. Aided by Richard's 7 goals in 12 playoff games, the Canadiens defeated Boston in the 1953 Stanley Cup Final to capture Montreal's first Stanley Cup championship since 1946.

Richard led the league in goals for the fourth time in his career with 37 in 1953–54, then for a fifth time in 1954–55 with 38 (shared with Bernie Geoffrion). He scored his 400th career goal on December 18, 1954, against Chicago.

=== Richard Riot ===
"What did Campbell do when Jean Béliveau was deliberately injured twice by Bill Mosienko of Chicago and Jack Evans of the Rangers? No penalty, no fine, no suspension. Did he suspend Gordie Howe of Detroit when he almost knocked out Dollard St. Laurent's eye? No! ... Strange that only Dick Irvin and I have the courage to risk our livelihood by defending our rights against such a dictator."

— Campbell forced Richard to cease writing for Samedi-Dimanche following these comments.

Opposition players continued to try to stop Richard through physical intimidation, and he often retaliated with equal force. The situation led to a running feud with NHL President Clarence Campbell. Richard had been fined numerous times by Campbell for on-ice incidents and at one point was forced to post a $1,000 "good-behaviour bond" after he criticized Campbell in a weekly column he helped author for Samedi-Dimanche. Richard was among many in Quebec who believed that Campbell treated French Canadian players more harshly than their English counterparts. The simmering dispute erupted after an incident in the Canadiens' March 13, 1955, game against Boston, when Hal Laycoe struck Richard in the head with his stick. Richard retaliated by slashing viciously at Laycoe's head, then punched linesman Cliff Thompson when the official attempted to intervene. Boston police attempted to arrest Richard for assault following the incident, but Montreal coaching staff and teammates refused police entry in protest.

Following two days of deliberation, Campbell announced that he had suspended Richard – who was leading the NHL's overall scoring race at the time – for the remainder of the regular season and the playoffs. In English Canada, Campbell was praised for doing what he could to control the erratic Richard. Unknown to most at the time, Campbell had long wanted to impose a lengthy suspension on Richard over his previous outbursts. As NHL president however, Campbell ultimately answered to the league's owners and they were reluctant to see such severe discipline imposed against one of the league's star players on account of their value in increasing game attendance. In French Quebec the suspension was viewed as an injustice, an unfair punishment given to a Francophone hero by the Anglophone establishment. Richard's supporters reacted angrily to Campbell: he received several death threats and, upon taking his customary seat at the next Canadiens game, unruly fans pelted him with vegetables, eggs and other debris. One fan threw a tear gas bomb at Campbell, which resulted in the Forum's evacuation and the game's forfeiture in Detroit's favour. Fans fleeing the arena were met by a large group of demonstrators who had massed outside prior to the game's start.

The mob of over 20,000 people developed into a riot. Windows and doors were smashed at the Forum and surrounding businesses. By the following morning, between 65 and 70 had been arrested. Over 50 stores were looted and 37 people injured. Damage was estimated at $100,000 ($1,164,539 in 2025 dollars). Richard had also attended the game, but left immediately following the forfeit. Frank Selke attempted to persuade him to return to try to disperse the crowd, but Richard refused, fearing that he would instead further inflame the passions of the mob. He took to the radio the next day asking for calm: "Do no more harm. Get behind the team in the playoffs. I will take my punishment and come back next year and help the club and the younger players to win the Cup."

The suspension cost Richard the Art Ross Trophy as the leading point scorer in the league, which he lost to teammate Geoffrion by one point. Richard never won the point title, finishing second five times in his career. Montreal fans booed Geoffrion when he surpassed Richard on the final day of the regular season. The fans continued to jeer Geoffrion into the following season. Montreal reached and lost the 1955 Stanley Cup Final four games to three without Richard. The defeat was a bitter loss for Richard, who struggled to control his anger.

=== Captain of a dynasty ===
Richard fulfilled his promise to Canadiens' fans, made in his post-riot radio address, by leading Montreal to a Stanley Cup championship in 1955–56 – the start of a still unprecedented 5 consecutive Stanley Cup victories by one team. The season began with the arrival of his young brother and future fellow NHL Hall of Famer Henri, a centre given the nickname the "Pocket Rocket", to the Canadiens roster. It also marked the return of his former linemate on the Punch Line, Toe Blake, as head coach. Along with general manager Frank Selke, Blake worked with Richard on moderating his temper and responding to the provocation of his opponents by scoring goals rather than engaging in fisticuffs. Richard finished the season with 38 goals and 71 points, second on the team in both respects to Jean Béliveau's 47 goals and 88 points. Richard added 14 points in 10 playoff games as Montreal defeated Detroit to claim the Stanley Cup. He scored the second and ultimately Cup-clinching goal in the fifth and final game, a 3–1 victory.

Entering his 15th NHL season in 1956–57, Richard's teammates named him captain of the Canadiens, succeeding Émile Bouchard, who had retired prior to the season. With 33 goals and 62 points, Richard again finished second on the team to Béliveau. In the playoffs, he scored the overtime-winning goal in the fifth game of the semi-final to eliminate New York, then scored four goals in a 5–1 victory over Boston in the first game of the finals en route to a five-game series win and second consecutive championship for Montreal.

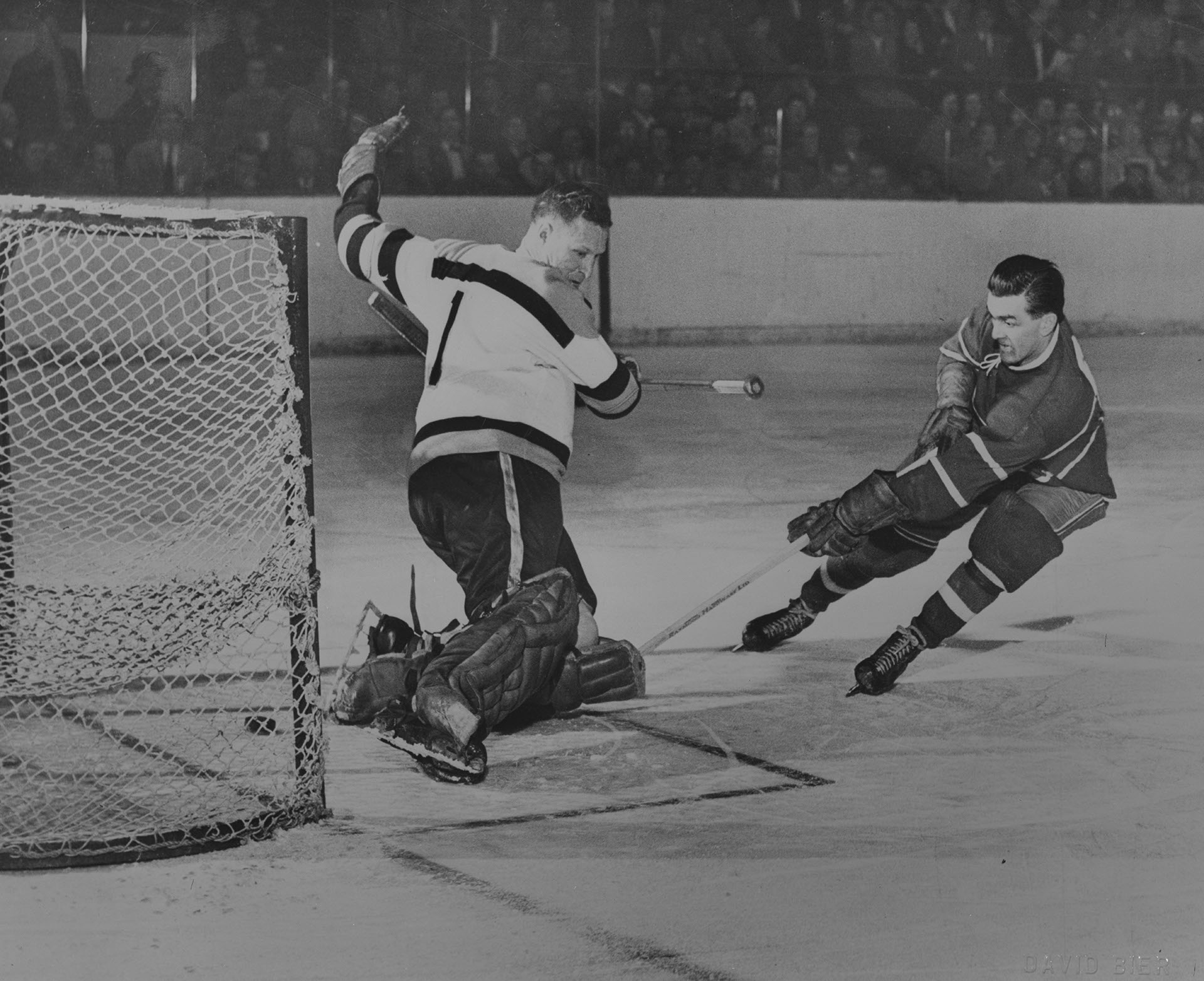
Richard scoring his 500th goal, 1957

Richard reached a major scoring milestone early in the 1957–58 season. During the first period of a 3–1 victory over Chicago on October 19, 1957, he became the first player in NHL history to score 500 goals in his career. As Richard celebrated with his teammates, it was announced to the Montreal Forum crowd: "Canadiens' goal, scored by Mr. Hockey himself, Maurice Richard". He played only 28 regular season games that season, scoring 34 points, as he missed three months due to a severed Achilles tendon. Returning in time for the playoffs, Richard led Montreal with 11 goals and 15 points as the team won its third consecutive Stanley Cup. He scored the overtime-winning goal in the fifth game of the finals against Boston. It was the sixth playoff overtime-winning goal of his career, and the third during the finals, both NHL records.

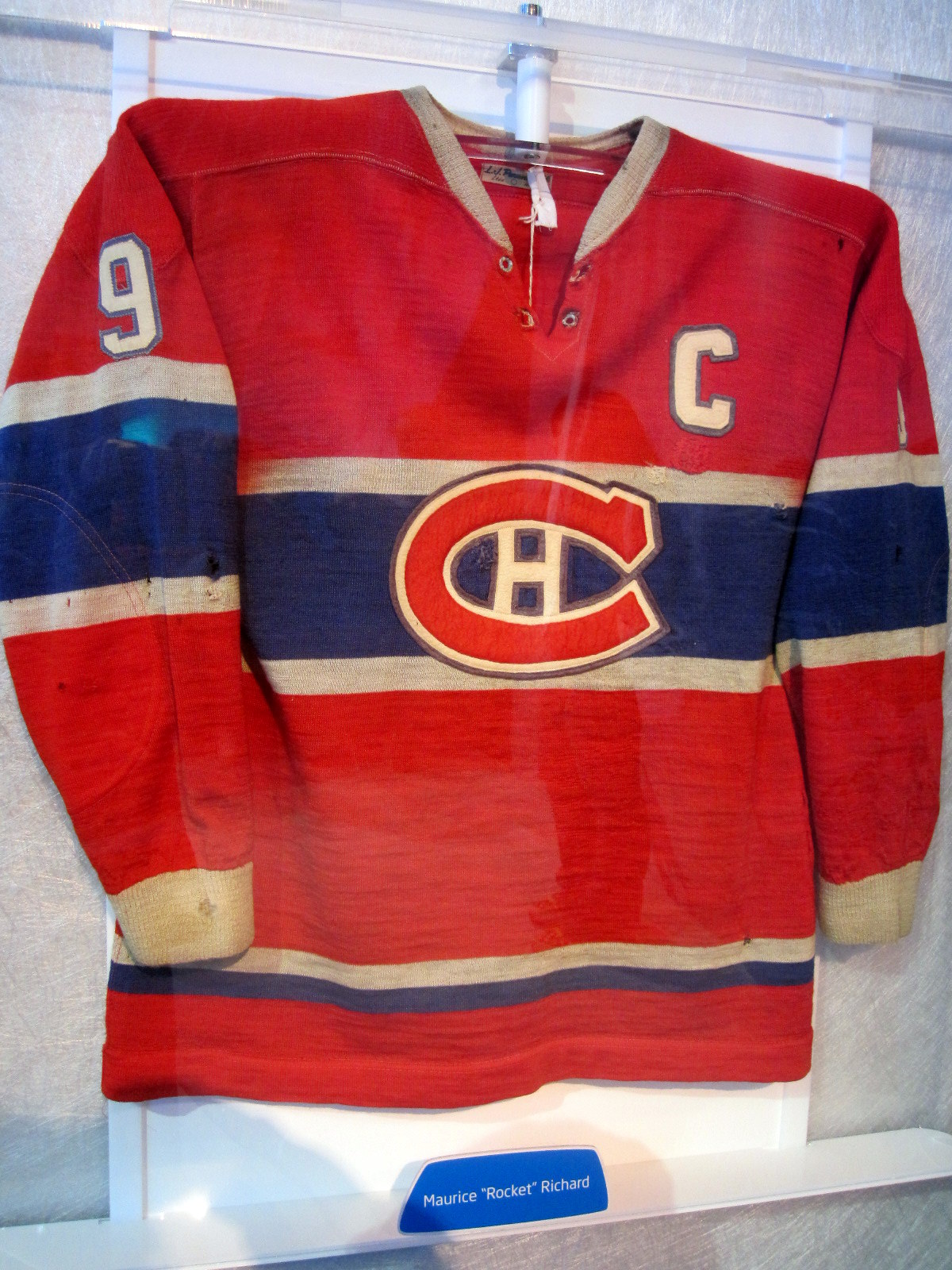
Sweater that was worn by Richard during his final season

At 37, Richard was the oldest player in the NHL in 1958–59. He scored 38 points in 42 games, but missed six weeks due to a broken ankle. Injuries again plagued Richard during the 1959–60 season as he missed a month due to a broken cheekbone. Montreal nonetheless won the Stanley Cup in both seasons. Richard scored no points in four games in the 1959 Stanley Cup Final, but recorded a goal and three assists in 1960. The titles were the seventh and eighth of Richard's career, and Montreal's five consecutive championships remain a record. The 1956–60 Canadiens rank as one of eight dynasties recognized by the NHL.

The playoff goal was Richard's last, as on September 15, 1960, he announced his retirement as a player. Richard had reported to Montreal's training camp that autumn, but Selke compelled Richard to end his playing career, fearing he was risking serious injury. In Richard's retirement speech, he said he had been contemplating leaving the game for two years, and stated that at age 39, the game had become too fast for him. Upon learning of Richard's retirement, Gordie Howe offered praise for his former rival: "He sure was a drawing card. He brought in the crowds that helped pay our wages. Richard certainly has been one of the greatest players in the game and we will miss him."

== Playing style ==
Richard was nicknamed "the Comet" early in his career. When teammate Ray Getliffe remarked that Richard "went in like a rocket" as he approached the opposition goal, Richard was dubbed "The Rocket" by a local sportswriter; both Baz O'Meara from the Montreal Star and Dink Carroll of the Montreal Gazette have been credited for the appellation. The nickname described Richard's play in terms of speed, strength, and determination. Teammate and coach Toe Blake said the moniker was fitting because "when he would take off, nothing got in his way that could stop him". Goaltender Jacques Plante declared it one of the most appropriate nicknames given to an athlete, noting the fierce intensity that often showed in Richard's eyes and comparing it to "the rocket's red glare" referenced in "The Star-Spangled Banner". Glenn Hall agreed: "What I remember most about Rocket was his eyes. When he came flying toward you with the puck on his stick, his eyes were all lit up, flashing and gleaming like a pinball machine. It was terrifying."

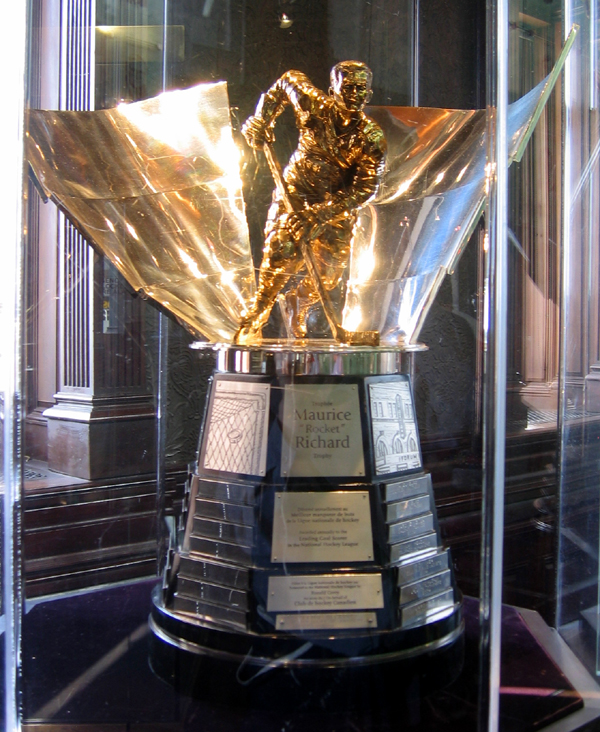
The Maurice "Rocket" Richard Trophy is presented annually to the leading goal scorer in the NHL

The prime of Richard's career was the era immediately following the Second World War, where battle-hardened players returned to the NHL and implemented a "gladiatorial" style that featured rugged, physical and often violent play. Richard's own temper was infamous, as illustrated by his actions that precipitated the Richard Riot.

A pure goal-scorer, Richard did not play with finesse, nor was he known for his passing. One of his teammates remarked that "Maurice wouldn't even pass you the salt". Richard led the NHL in goals five times, but never in points. He was best known for dashing toward the net from the blue line and was equally adept at scoring from his forehand or backhand. His exploits revived a Montreal Canadiens franchise that had struggled to draw fans in the 1930s. In addition to his 14 appearances on post-season all-star teams (eight on the first team, six on the second), Richard played in 13 consecutive NHL All-Star Games between 1947 and 1959.

Richard was still an active player when Gordie Howe overtook his career record for points. Howe surpassed Richard's career mark of 544 goals in 1963, while the latter's record of 50 goals in one season stood for 20 years until broken by Bobby Hull in 1965. The Montreal Canadiens donated the Maurice "Rocket" Richard Trophy to the NHL in 1999 as an award presented annually to the league's leading goal scorer.

== Personal life ==
Upon his retirement as a player, Selke offered Richard a job as a team ambassador and promised to pay him his full playing salary in the first year. After serving in the position for three years, Richard was named a vice-president of the Canadiens in 1964. He became disgruntled with a role he felt was powerless and only honorary, and resigned one year later. Richard grew estranged from the organization as his desire to be involved in the team's operations was ignored, and the split deepened when the Canadiens forced Frank Selke to retire in 1965. He eventually refused to allow his name to be associated with the team.

As Richard struggled both with the need to find a purpose to his post-retirement life and the fear of being forgotten, he attached his name to numerous endeavours. He acted as a consulting editor for a magazine titled Maurice Richard's Hockey Illustrated, owned the "544 / 9 Tavern" (named for his career goal total and sweater number) in Montreal, and was a pitchman for dozens of products, including beer, hair dye, car batteries, fishing tackle and children's toys. He continued to use his name as a promotional vehicle for over 30 years after his retirement. Richard briefly returned to hockey in 1972 as head coach for the Quebec Nordiques of the World Hockey Association. He lasted only two games, a win and a loss, before finding himself unable to handle the strain of coaching. Richard reconciled with the Canadiens in 1981 and resumed his team ambassador role.

Richard and his wife, Lucille, lived in Montreal where they raised seven children: Huguette, Maurice Jr., Norman, André, Suzanne, Paulo and Jean. They had 14 grandchildren. Lucille died of cancer in 1994, two years after the Richards celebrated their 50th wedding anniversary. Richard's companion late in his life was Sonia Raymond.

== Illness and death ==
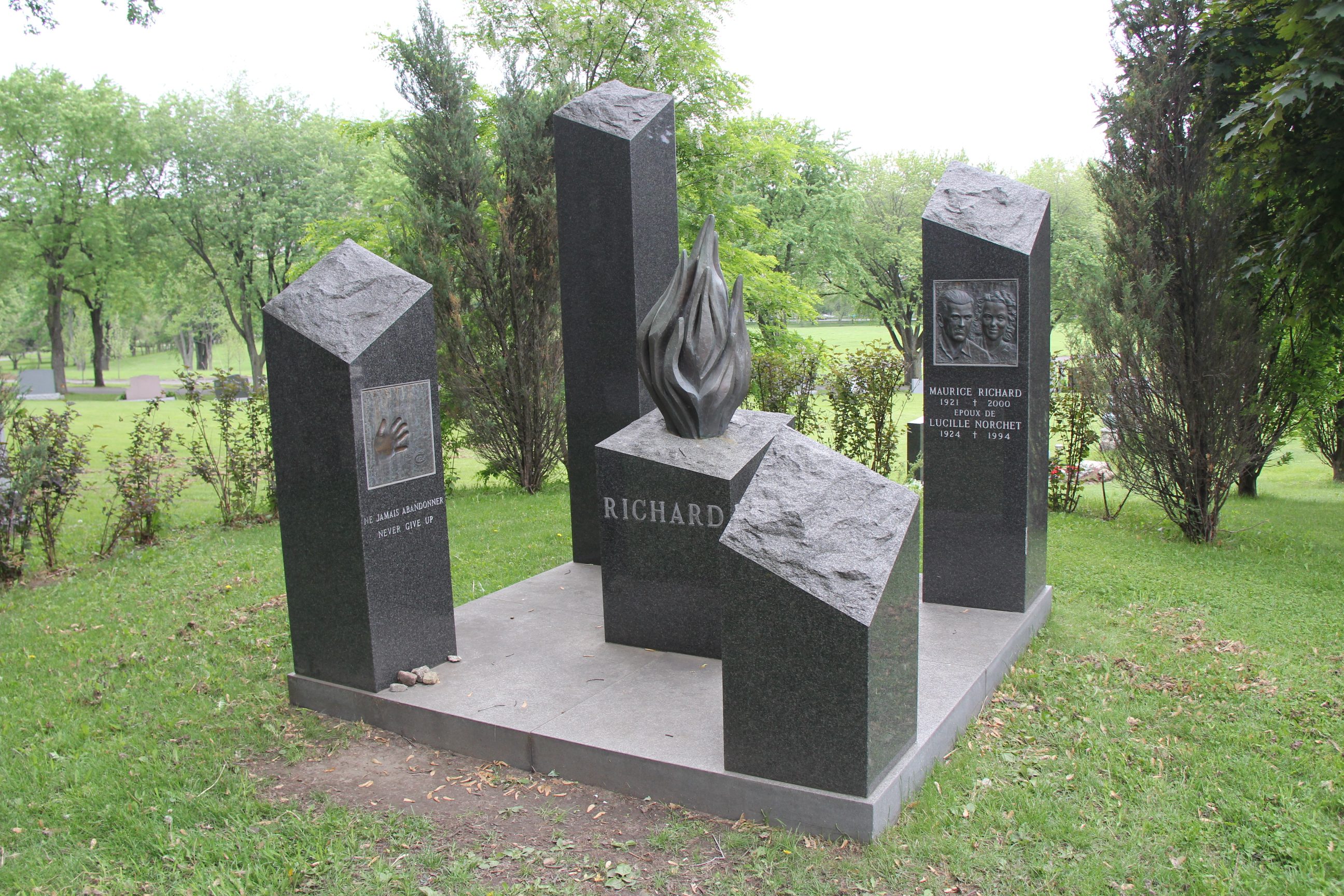
Tomb for Richard at Notre Dame des Neiges Cemetery in Montreal

It was announced in 1998 that Richard was diagnosed with abdominal cancer. He died from the disease two years later on May 27, 2000 and was entombed at the Notre Dame des Neiges Cemetery in Montreal. Prior to game one of the 2000 Stanley Cup Final between the New Jersey Devils and Dallas Stars, there was a short tribute video highlighting the great moments and legacy of Richard's career.

== Legacy ==
Numerous honours were bestowed upon Richard throughout and following his career: the Canadian Press named him its male athlete of the year on three occasions, and in 1957, Richard won the Lou Marsh Trophy as Canada's athlete of the year. The Canadiens retired his sweater number 9 in 1960, while the Hockey Hall of Fame waived its five-year waiting period after retirement and inducted him in 1961. That same year, the 5,000-seat Maurice Richard Arena was built and named in his honour.

Upon the creation of the Order of Canada in 1967, Richard was named one of the inaugural members and, in 1998, was elevated to the rank of Companion of the Order of Canada. Canada's Sports Hall of Fame honoured him in 1975, and Richard was given a star on Canada's Walk of Fame in 1999. He was appointed to the Queen's Privy Council for Canada in 1992.

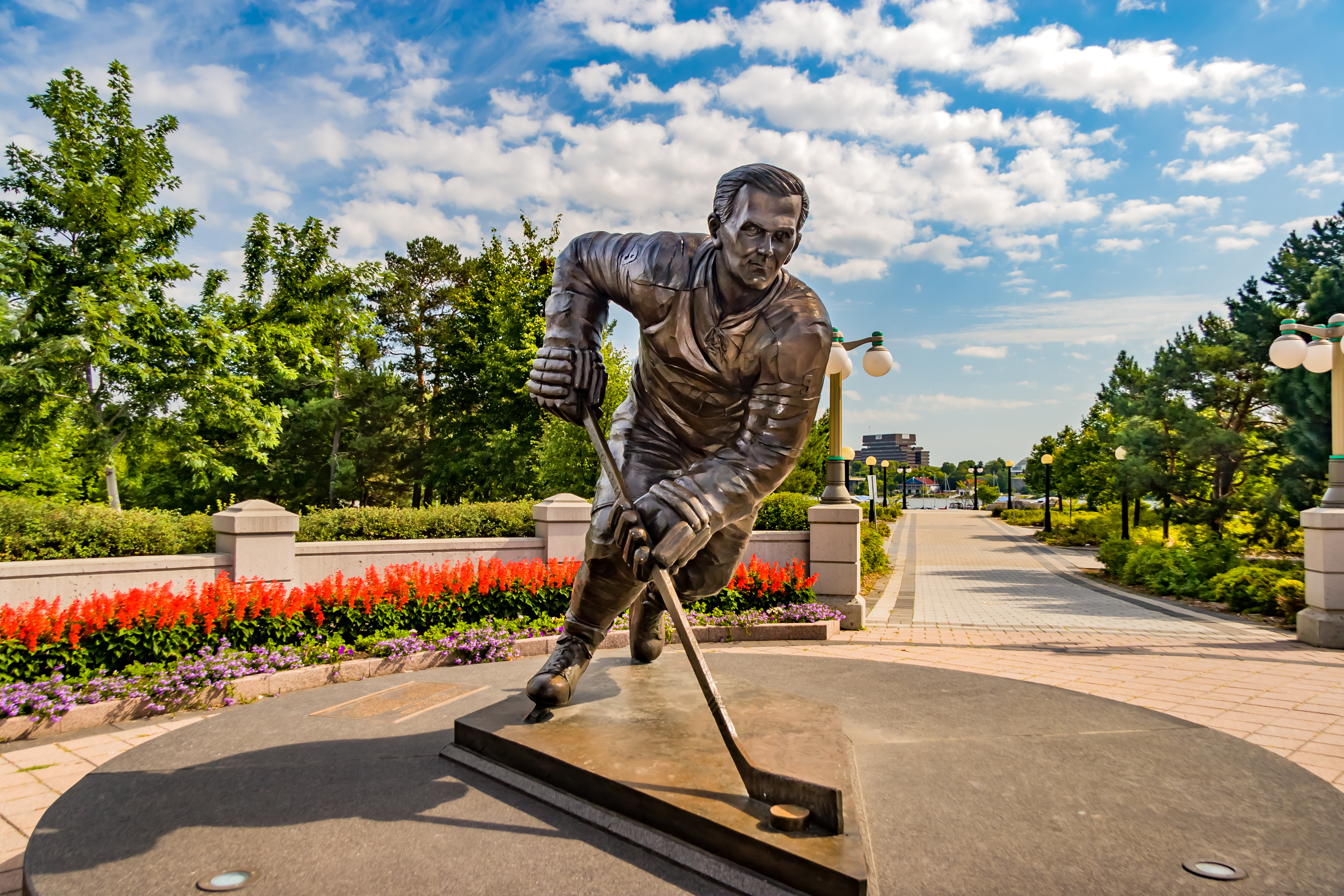
The monument to Richard outside Jacques Cartier Park in Gatineau, Quebec

While he was a popular player throughout Canada, Richard was an icon within Quebec. Author Roch Carrier explained the passion Richard elicited from the fans in his 1979 Canadian-classic short story The Hockey Sweater. Carrier wrote of how he and his friends all emulated Richard's style and mannerisms: "we were five Maurice Richards against five other Maurice Richards, throwing themselves on the puck. We were ten players all wearing the uniform of the Montreal Canadiens, all with the same burning enthusiasm. We all wore the famous number 9 on our backs." The story's publication and subsequent adaptation into a National Film Board animated short helped entrench Richard's image as a pan-Canadian icon. Richard's popularity persisted late into his life: when introduced as part of the ceremonies following the final hockey game at the Montreal Forum, Richard was brought to tears by Canadiens' fans, who acknowledged him with an 11-minute standing ovation. Upon his death, the province of Quebec honoured Richard with a state funeral, a first in Quebec for a non-politician. Over 115,000 people paid their respects by viewing his lying in state at the Molson Centre.

The Richard Riot has achieved a mythical place in Canadian folklore. The riot is commonly viewed as a violent manifestation of the discontent Francophones within Quebec held with their place in largely Anglophone Canada, and some historians consider the riot to be a precursor to the 1960s Quiet Revolution. In its 40th anniversary retrospective of the Riot, Montreal newspaper La Presse opened with the following passage: "Forty years ago began one of the most dramatic episodes in the history of Quebec, and of hockey." Richard himself publicly dismissed his role as a catalyst for cultural or political change. In a 1975 interview, he said he played with "English boys" and was largely unaware of the situation in French Quebec at the time.

In an article published four days after the riot, journalist André Laurendeau was the first to suggest that it was a sign of growing nationalism in Quebec. Laurendeau suggested the riot "betrayed what lay behind the apparent indifference and long-held passiveness of French Canadians". In contrast, in his book The Rocket: A Cultural History of Maurice Richard, Benoît Melançon disputes the importance of the riot, stating its perceived importance in history grew retroactively with Richard's myth. Melançon wrote: "According to this popular narrative, for the first time the people of Quebec stood up for themselves; especially English Canada delights in anachronistically announcing that this was the beginning of the 1960s Quiet Revolution."

In 2025, Richard was officially named an historic figure by the Government of Quebec. The government defines an historic figure as "a person who actually existed, is now deceased, and played a role in the history of Quebec or in a specific domain of that history." Announcing the designation on the 25th anniversary of Richard's death, Quebec Culture Minister Mathieu Lacombe said that "Maurice Richard was not only an exceptional athlete…he also embodied the pride and aspirations of French-speaking Quebecers." On March 15, 2026, Richard's first official hockey game was commemorated at Bell Centre through two plaques.

Richard is the subject of the 2005 biopic The Rocket, and the 2025 documentary film Maurice.

== Career statistics ==
			Regular season					Playoffs
Season	Team	League	GP	G	A	Pts	PIM	GP	G	A	Pts	PIM
1939–40	Verdun Maple Leafs	QJHL	10	4	1	5	2	4	6	3	9	2
1939–40	Verdun Maple Leafs	QSHL	1	0	1	1	0	—	—	—	—	—
1939–40	Verdun Maple Leafs	Mem. Cup	—	—	—	—	—	7	7	9	16	16
1940–41	Montreal Canadiens (Sr.)	QSHL	1	0	1	1	0	—	—	—	—	—
1941–42	Montreal Canadiens (Sr.)	QSHL	31	8	9	17	27	6	2	1	3	6
1942–43	Montreal Canadiens	NHL	16	5	6	11	4	—	—	—	—	—
1943–44	Montreal Canadiens	NHL	46	32	22	54	45	9	12	5	17	10
1944–45	Montreal Canadiens	NHL	50	50	23	73	46	6	6	2	8	10
1945–46	Montreal Canadiens	NHL	50	27	22	49	50	9	7	4	11	15
1946–47	Montreal Canadiens	NHL	60	45	26	71	69	10	6	5	11	44
1947–48	Montreal Canadiens	NHL	53	28	25	53	89	—	—	—	—	—
1948–49	Montreal Canadiens	NHL	59	20	18	38	110	7	2	1	3	14
1949–50	Montreal Canadiens	NHL	70	43	22	65	114	5	1	1	2	6
1950–51	Montreal Canadiens	NHL	65	42	24	66	97	11	9	4	13	13
1951–52	Montreal Canadiens	NHL	48	27	17	44	44	11	4	2	6	6
1952–53	Montreal Canadiens	NHL	70	28	33	61	112	12	7	1	8	2
1953–54	Montreal Canadiens	NHL	70	37	30	67	112	11	3	0	3	22
1954–55	Montreal Canadiens	NHL	67	38	36	74	125	—	—	—	—	—
1955–56	Montreal Canadiens	NHL	70	38	33	71	89	10	5	9	14	24
1956–57	Montreal Canadiens	NHL	63	33	29	62	27	10	8	3	11	8
1957–58	Montreal Canadiens	NHL	28	15	19	34	28	10	11	4	15	10
1958–59	Montreal Canadiens	NHL	42	17	21	38	27	4	0	0	0	2
1959–60	Montreal Canadiens	NHL	51	19	16	35	50	8	1	3	4	2
NHL totals			978	544	422	966	1,285	133	82	44	126	188

== Coaching record ==
Team	Season	Regular season						Postseason
Team	Season	G	W	L	T	Pts	Finish	Result
QUE	1972–73	2	1	1	0	(71)	(resigned)	—

== Awards and honours ==
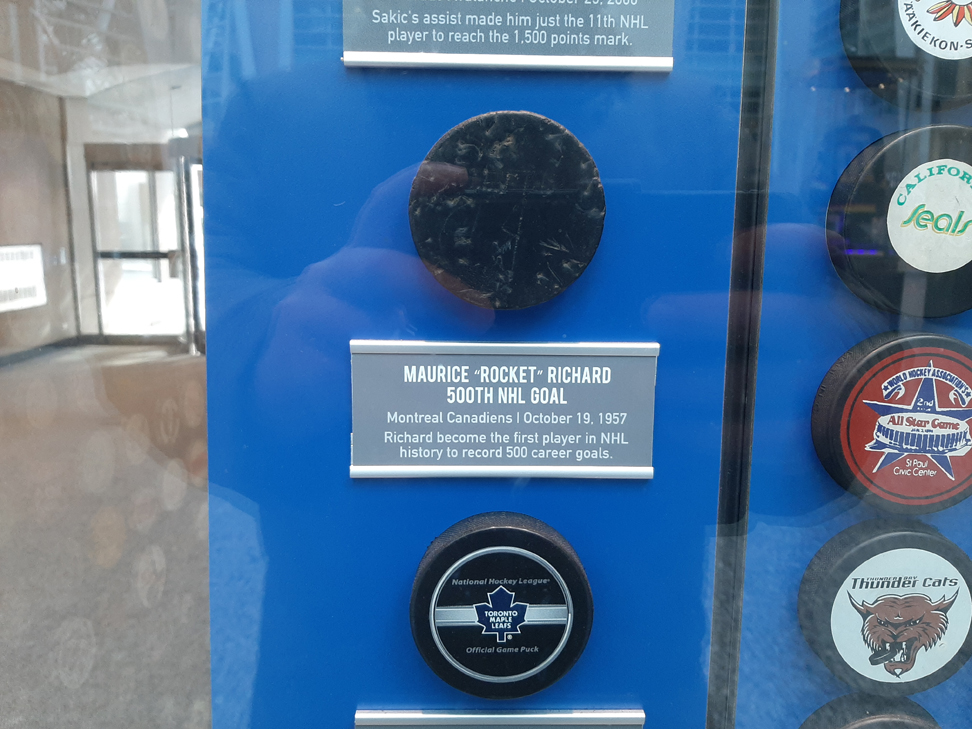
The puck Richard used to score his 500th NHL goal on October 19, 1957. Richard was the first player in league history to record 500 career goals.

National Hockey League
Award	Year	Ref.
First team All-Star	1944–45, 1945–46, 1946–47, 1947–48, 1948–49, 1949–50, 1954–55, 1955–56	
Second Team All-Star	1943–44, 1950–51; 1951–52, 1952–53; 1953–54, 1956–57	
Stanley Cup champion	1943–44, 1945–46, 1952–53, 1955–56, 1956–57, 1957–58, 1958–59, 1959–60	
Hart Trophy; Most valuable player	1946–47	

National
Award	Year	Ref.
Canadian Press male athlete of the year	1952, 1957; 1958	
Lou Marsh Trophy; Canadian athlete of the year	1957	

== See also ==
- List of family relations in the NHL
- List of players with five or more goals in an NHL game

=== Archives ===
There is a Maurice Richard fonds at Library and Archives Canada. The archival reference number is R9534.

Sporting positions
Preceded by Émile Bouchard	Montreal Canadiens captain 1956–60	Succeeded by Doug Harvey
Preceded by Position created	Head coach of the Quebec Nordiques; 2 games, 1972	Succeeded by Maurice Filion
Awards
Preceded by Max Bentley	Hart Trophy Winner; 1947	Succeeded by Buddy O'Connor
