= Cliff Thompson =

American ice hockey player

- Born: December 9, 1918 Winchester, Massachusetts, United States
- Died: February 6, 1997 (aged 78)
- Height: 5 ft 11 in (180 cm)
- Weight: 185 lb (84 kg; 13 st 3 lb)
- Position: Defence
- Shot: Left
- Played for: Boston Bruins
- Playing career: 1939–1950

Clifford Bernard Thompson (December 9, 1918 – February 6, 1997) was an American professional ice hockey player and official. He played defense in the Boston Bruins organization from 1939 until 1950, playing 16 career games in the National Hockey League (NHL) with the Bruins during the 1941–42 and 1948–49 seasons. The rest of his career was mainly spent in the minor Eastern Hockey League. After his playing career, Thompson became an linesman, and in 1955 was involved in an altercation with Maurice Richard, leading to Richard's suspension and the Richard Riot.

== Playing career ==
Born in Winchester, Massachusetts but raised in Stoneham, Massachusetts, Thompson started his pro career with a tryout with the Boston Olympics in the 1938–39 season. He returned for two seasons with the Olympics, scoring 16 goals in 35 games in his rookie season. In 1941–42, he made his NHL debut with the Bruins, playing three games, while mainly playing for the Hershey Bears and St. Paul of the American Hockey Association (AHA). From 1942–1945, Thompson fought in World War II. He returned to the Olympics and played every season for the club until 1950, with a ten-game call-up to the Bruins in 1948–49 and nine games for the Bears that same season.

== Career statistics ==
=== Regular season and playoffs ===
			Regular season					Playoffs
Season	Team	League	GP	G	A	Pts	PIM	GP	G	A	Pts	PIM
1938–39	Hebron Academy	HS-ME	—	—	—	—	—	—	—	—	—	—
1938–39	Boston Olympics	QPHL	4	3	1	4	2	—	—	—	—	—
1939–40	Boston Olympics	EAHL	35	16	14	30	33	5	0	2	2	4
1940–41	Boston Olympics	EAHL	65	12	18	30	80	4	0	4	4	4
1941–42	Boston Bruins	NHL	6	0	0	0	2	—	—	—	—	—
1941–42	Hershey Bears	AHL	20	3	5	8	2	—	—	—	—	—
1941–42	St. Paul Saints	AHA	28	5	6	11	22	2	1	0	1	0
1941–42	Boston Olympics	EAHL	—	—	—	—	—	1	0	1	1	0
1945–46	Boston Olympics	EAHL	43	7	13	20	18	12	2	4	6	0
1946–47	Boston Olympics	EAHL	53	11	19	30	51	9	2	6	8	6
1947–48	Boston Olympics	QSHL	48	10	20	30	57	—	—	—	—	—
1947–48	Boston Olympics	EAHL	19	5	16	21	22	—	—	—	—	—
1948–49	Boston Bruins	NHL	10	0	1	1	0	—	—	—	—	—
1948–49	Hershey Bears	AHL	9	0	0	0	2	—	—	—	—	—
1948–49	Boston Olympics	QSHL	26	4	18	22	35	—	—	—	—	—
1949–50	Boston Olympics	EAHL	26	7	14	21	57	3	2	1	3	0
EAHL totals			241	58	94	152	261	34	6	18	24	14
NHL totals			16	0	1	1	2	—	—	—	—	—

== Awards and honours ==
- EAHL Second All-Star Team (1947, 1948)
