= Toronto Marlboros =

Canadian ice hockey club

Toronto Marlborough Athletic Club
- City: Toronto, Ontario
- League: Ontario Hockey League
- Founded: 1903
- Operated: 1904–1989
- Home arena: Maple Leaf Gardens
- Colours: Blue and white
- Parent clubs: Toronto Maple Leafs (1927–1967)

Franchise history
- 1904–1989: Toronto Marlboros
- 1989–1991: Dukes of Hamilton
- 1991–present: Guelph Storm

Championships
- Playoff championships: 1929, 1955, 1956, 1964, 1967, 1973, & 1975 Memorial Cup Champions

The Toronto Marlborough Athletic Club, commonly known as the Toronto Marlboros, was an ice hockey franchise in Toronto, Canada. Founded in 1903, it operated junior ice hockey and senior ice hockey teams in the Ontario Hockey Association and later the Ontario Hockey League. The Marlboros were a farm team to the Toronto Maple Leafs and one of the dominant junior teams in history, winning seven Memorial Cup championships. The senior team competed for the Stanley Cup in 1904, and won the Allan Cup in 1950. After decline from the late 1970s, the sale of the franchise, and a move away from Toronto, it became the Guelph Storm in 1991.

Their heritage has been perpetuated by the Toronto Marlboros Hockey Club, which operates several minor ice hockey teams in the Greater Toronto Hockey League; and by the Toronto Marlies of the American Hockey League.

== History ==
The Toronto Marlborough Athletic Club was founded in Toronto, Ontario in 1903 by a group of Toronto sportsmen. It was named after the Duke of Marlborough. A hockey program was started in 1904. The team was commonly known as the Marlboros or Marlies and was also nicknamed the Dukes.

The senior ice hockey team played in the Ontario Hockey Association and won the J. Ross Robertson Cup in 1904, 1905, 1941, 1949 and 1950.

The senior team competed for, but lost, the Stanley Cup in 1904 against the Ottawa Silver Seven. The club was thrust onto the national scene in 1927 when Conn Smythe bought the Toronto Marlboros to be the farm team for his other recently acquired National Hockey League team, the Toronto Maple Leafs. From 1927 to 1989 the Marlboros and Maple Leafs shared common ownership, first under the Smythe family and later under Harold Ballard.

In 1933, Frank J. Selke testified in court that the Marlboros senior team had a proposed agreement to guarantee its finances by the Toronto Maple Leafs. The agreement went unsigned when OHA secretary W. A. Hewitt voiced opposition to the financial support of amateur teams by professional teams.

The Marlboros served as a farm team for the Maple Leafs for 40 years until direct NHL sponsorship of junior teams ended in 1967 when the NHL made the Entry Draft universal; however, the two clubs continued to remain affiliated under a common ownership until 1989. During this time the Marlboros sent over 180 players to the NHL, including six future Hockey Hall of Fame inductees. The two teams often played double headers on Saturdays, with the junior games in the afternoon and the NHL games in the evening.

The original Hot Stove Club was formed at Maple Leaf Gardens on May 28, 1937, for the purpose of raising funds to support the Marlborough Hockey Club. The Hot Stove Club was given a permanent bar & lounge at Maple Leaf Gardens in 1963. From 1929 to 1975 the Marlboros won the national junior championship seven times.

Marlboro players from the Memorial Cups in the 1950s and 1960s jumped directly to the Maple Leafs, helping them win the Stanley Cup four times in the 1960s. Former NHL stars stayed in the organization to help coach in the junior ranks. Turk Broda and George Armstrong both coached the Marlboros to Memorial Cup victories.

Stafford Smythe organized the Metro Junior A League in 1961 as a rival league to the OHA, with the Marlboros as its charter member. After the league folded in 1963, the Toronto Neil McNeil Maroons were amalgamated into the Marlboros along with prospect players signed to the Toronto Maple Leafs, along with their coach Jim Gregory.

The Marlboros returned to prominence again in 1973, coached by former Toronto Maple Leafs captain George Armstrong. Armstrong's team in 1973 lost only seven games all season, and two years later he coached the Marlboros to their seventh national title in 1975.

The team began to decline in the standings in the late 1970s which continued through the 1980s. Some people felt that Harold Ballard's penny-pinching ways helped contribute to the demise of Canada's most successful junior team. In October 1988, with the team losing hundreds of thousands of dollars a year, Maple Leaf Gardens Limited reached an agreement to sell the Toronto Marlboros for a reported $500,000, severing their ties with the Maple Leafs. The Leafs retained the rights to the Marlies name. The OHL team moved to Hamilton for the 1989-90 season, becoming the Dukes of Hamilton. They were not financially successful in Hamilton, though, and after only two seasons the Dukes became the Guelph Storm.

== Championships ==
The Toronto Marlboros won the Memorial Cup seven times, more than any other team in the Cup's history. The Marlies also won 10 OHA championships in 18 final appearances.

J. Ross Robertson Cup

- 1928 Won vs. Newmarket Redmen
- 1929 Won vs. Kitchener Greenshirts
- 1932 Won vs. Newmarket Redmen
- 1940 Lost to Oshawa Generals
- 1941 Lost to Oshawa Generals
- 1949 Lost to Barrie Flyers
- 1951 Lost to Barrie Flyers
- 1954 Lost to St. Catharines Teepees
- 1955 Won vs. St. Catharines Teepees
- 1956 Won vs. Barrie Flyers
- 1958 Won vs. Hamilton Tiger Cubs
- 1964 Won vs. Montreal Jr. Canadiens
- 1965 Lost to Niagara Falls Flyers
- 1967 Won vs. Hamilton Red Wings
- 1970 Lost to Montreal Jr. Canadiens
- 1971 Lost to St. Catharines Black Hawks
- 1973 Won vs. Peterborough Petes
- 1975 Won vs. Hamilton Fincups

Hamilton Spectator Trophy

- 1959–1960 59 points
- 1963–1964 87 points
- 1971–1972 93 points
- 1972–1973 103 points
- 1974–1975 105 points

Memorial Cup

- 1929 Defeated Elmwood Millionaires
- 1955 Defeated Regina Pats
- 1956 Defeated Regina Pats
- 1964 Defeated Edmonton Oil Kings
- 1967 Defeated Port Arthur Marrs
- 1973 Defeated Quebec Remparts
- 1975 Defeated New Westminster Bruins

Eastern Canadian Champions

- 1928 Lost to Ottawa Gunners
- 1929 Defeated Ottawa Shamrocks

George Richardson Memorial Trophy

- 1955 Defeated Quebec Frontenacs
- 1956 Defeated Montreal Jr. Canadiens
- 1958 Lost to Ottawa-Hull Junior Canadiens
- 1964 Defeated Notre Dame de Grace Monarchs
- 1967 Defeated Thetford Mines Canadiens

== Memorial Cups ==
=== 1929 ===
The Marlboros reached their first Memorial Cup series in 1929 after being upset in 1928 by the Ottawa Gunners. In 1929 the Marlboros defeated the Ottawa Shamrocks in a two-game total goals series by 6–5. Ottawa won the first game 4–3, and Toronto won the second game 3–1.

Toronto played the Elmwood Millionaires from Winnipeg, Manitoba, in a best of three series starting on March 29 at the Arena Gardens (Mutual Street Arena) for the Memorial Cup. The Marlboros won the first game 4–2 in overtime. On March 31, Toronto won game 2 by an identical score of 4–2 for its first Memorial Cup.

=== 1955 ===
Turk Broda took over the coaching duties of the Marlboros midway through the 1954–55 season. In the playoffs the Marlboros defeated the reigning Memorial Cup champions St. Catharines Teepees, followed by the Quebec Remparts to win the Eastern Canadian championship.

After a long train ride to Regina, Saskatchewan, to Marlboros and the Regina Pats took part in the First Annual Memorial Cup Dinner. The idea of the banquet was one of Harold Ballard's long-lasting effects on the game. The next day the two teams would start a best of seven series for the Cup.

Regina won the first game 3–1. Toronto won the next two games scores of 5–2, and 3–2. Regina tied up game four at 2 goals each in the dying minutes of regulation to send the match to overtime. Billy Harris scored in overtime to give the Marlboros a 3 games to 1 lead. Game five was also tied after three periods. Toronto scored three unanswered goals, winning 8–5 in overtime, and their second Memorial Cup.

=== 1956 ===
Toronto defeated the Montreal Junior Canadiens in an 8-game series to return to the Memorial Cup and a rematch versus the Regina Pats. The championship series started at Maple Leaf Gardens on April 27.

The teams tied the first game at 4 goals each. Toronto put together three consecutive victories by scores of 5–1, 4–2, and 6–1. The Marlboros captured their second consecutive Memorial Cup in game five by a score of 7–4. The Oshawa Generals were the first team to accomplish the feat in 1938–39 and 1939–40.

1964
Toronto defeated the defending OHA champions Niagara Falls Flyers and the Montreal Jr. Canadiens to win the J. Ross Robertson Cup. The Marlboros swept the NOHA champion North Bay Trappers to play the Quebec champion Notre-Dame-de-Grace Monarchs, who were coached by Scotty Bowman. Toronto prevailed to return to the Memorial Cup after an eight-year absence. Their opponent was the perennial Abbott Cup champion Edmonton Oil Kings.

The series opened at Maple Leaf Gardens with a 5–2 Toronto victory. The Marlboros won games two and three with scores of 3–2 and 5–2. Toronto finished the series sweep with a 7–2 win in game 4. A number of the players on the 1964 Marlboros team, including Ron Ellis, Mike Walton and Pete Stemkowski, helped the Maple Leafs capture the Stanley Cup in 1967.

=== 1967 ===
Toronto defeated the Montreal Jr. Canadiens and Hamilton Red Wings for the OHA title, then eliminated the Thetford Mines Canadiens to capture the eastern Canadian championships. The Marlboros played the Port Arthur Marrs in the Memorial Cup series hosted at the Fort William Gardens in what is now the city of Thunder Bay, Ontario.

The Marlboros won the first two games by scores of 6–3, and 8–4. Port Arthur won the third game 6–4 in a heavily penalized match, including a bench brawl with one second left in the game. Toronto won the last two games by scores of 6–0, and 6–3 capturing its 5th Memorial Cup. In 1966–67, the Maple Leafs also won the Stanley Cup, the last year the two clubs were national champions at the same time.

=== 1973 ===
The Marlboros of 1972–73 lost only seven games in the regular season. The team was ranked # 1 in Canada going into the playoffs. Toronto eliminated the St. Catharines Black Hawks and Ottawa 67's before meeting the Peterborough Petes in the OHA finals.

The series versus the Petes went to a seventh game played at Maple Leaf Gardens in front of 16,485 spectators, a record at the time for junior hockey attendance. Toronto needed only a tie game to advance, and did so in dramatic fashion. Paulin Bordeleau scored on a penalty shot in the last minute to tie the game at 5 goals each.

After winning the OHA title, the Marlboros travelled to Memorial Cup hosted at the Montreal Forum where their opponents would be the Quebec Remparts and the Medicine Hat Tigers, who were led by future NHL star Lanny McDonald.

The Marlies beat Quebec 5–2 in the first game, and lost 3–2 to the Tigers in the second game. The Remparts then beat the Tigers 8–3 in game three. Since each team had won a game, Toronto and Quebec played each other in the finals based on goals for and against. The Marlboros scored a 9–1 victory for their 6th Memorial Cup.

=== 1975 ===
The 1975 playoff run for the Marlboros was complicated by Mark Napier and John Tonelli signing professional contracts before the season ended. Tonelli would sit out all the Marlboros games after his 18th birthday so he would not jeopardize playing for the Houston Aeros.

Toronto stumbled through the playoffs managing come-from-behind victories in series versus the 8th place Kingston Canadians and 5th place Sudbury Wolves. Both series went 8 games, and the Marlboros were a point away from being eliminated each time but stayed alive. The Marlboros then beat the Hamilton Fincups in the finals for their last OHA championship. Toronto would face the New Westminster Bruins, and the Sherbrooke Castors in the Memorial Cup series played at the Kitchener Memorial Auditorium Complex.

Toronto beat Sherbrooke 5–4 in overtime in game 1 after coming back from three goals down. The Bruins beat the Castors (Beavers in English) 7–5 in game two, defeated Toronto 6–2 in the third game to reach the finals. In a rematch versus the Castors in the semi-final, Toronto won 10–4 to reach the finals versus New Westminster.

The Marlboros continued their momentum in the finals winning 7–3, and capturing their seventh and final Memorial Cup championship. Coach Armstrong said it was all worth it, even after his team had tossed him into the hotel swimming pool during a victory party.

== Coaches ==
One of the most famous Maple Leafs and Marlboros of all time, George Armstrong, coached the Marlboros to their final two Memorial Cup victories in 1972–73 and 1974–75.

Two Toronto Marlboros coaches have been awarded the Matt Leyden Trophy as the OHA Coach of the Year: George Armstrong 1972–73 in his first year, and Dave Chambers in 1979–80.

Partial list of Toronto Marlboros coaches.

- 1928–1929 Frank J. Selke
- 1946–1947 Bill Thoms
- 1953–1954 Reg Hamilton
- 1954–1955 Turk Broda
- 1955–1956 Turk Broda
- 1960–1961 Turk Broda
- 1961–1962 Turk Broda
- 1963–1964 Jim Gregory
- 1966–1967 Gus Bodnar
- 1972–1973 Frank Bonello
- 1972–1973 George Armstrong
- 1974–1975 George Armstrong
- 1978–1979 Bill White
- 1979–1980 Dave Chambers
- 1980–1986 James Jones
- 1986–1987 Paul Dennis
- 1987–1989 Terry Martin

== Players ==
Until the NHL instituted the Entry Draft in 1967, the Maple Leafs relied heavily on the Jr. A. Marlboros to produce NHL players. Multiple players were part of Maple Leafs Stanley Cup winning teams. In total, 202 OHA Junior Marlboros went on to play in the National Hockey League.

=== Award winners ===
Red Tilson Trophy
(Most Outstanding Player)

- 1949–50 - George Armstrong
- 1971-72 - Dave Gardner

Eddie Powers Memorial Trophy
(Scoring Champion)

- 1937–38 - Hank Goldup
- 1940–41 - Gaye Stewart
- 1971–72 - Billy Harris & Dave Gardner
- 1974–75 - Bruce Boudreau

Jim Mahon Memorial Trophy
(Top Scoring Right Winger)

- 1971–72 - Billy Harris
- 1974–75 - Mark Napier

Emms Family Award
(Rookie of the Year)

- 1979–80 - Bruce Dowie

Dave Pinkney Trophy
(Lowest Team GAA)

- 1949–50 - Don Lockhart
- 1950–51 - Don Lockhart
- 1951–52 - Don Head
- 1952–53 - John Henderson
- 1954–55 - John Albani
- 1955–56 - Jim Crocket
- 1956–57 - Len Broderick
- 1957–58 - Len Broderick
- 1972–73 - Mike Palmateer

Leo Lalonde Memorial Trophy
(Overage Player of the Year)

- 1986–87 - Mike Richard

Bobby Smith Trophy
(Scholastic Player of the Year)

- 1988–89 - Brian Collinson

=== Hockey Hall of Famers ===
Six players who played for the Marlboros and Maple Leafs have been inducted into the Hockey Hall of Fame. They are George Armstrong, Charlie Conacher, Red Horner, Harvey Jackson, Joe Primeau and Bob Pulford. Former Marlboros Brad Park and Mark Howe were also inducted into the Hall of Fame as NHL defenceman, and Carl Voss was inducted as a builder.

=== NHL alumni ===
- Doug Acomb
- Doug Adam
- Gary Aldcorn
- Mike Amodeo
- John Anderson
- George Armstrong
- Tim Armstrong
- Earl Balfour
- Fred Barrett
- Baz Bastien
- Bobby Baun
- Bill Berg
- Todd Bidner
- Jack Bionda
- Charles "Chuck" Blair
- Frank "Buzz" Boll
- Hugh Bolton
- Paulin Bordeleau
- Bruce Boudreau
- Wally Boyer
- Carl Brewer
- Ken Broderick
- Len Broderick
- Arnie Brown
- Al Buchanan
- Sean Burke
- Charlie Burns
- Bert Burry
- Mike Byers
- Terry Caffery
- Wayne Carleton
- Jacques Caron
- Andre Champagne
- Rob Cimetta
- Bill Collins
- Gary Collins
- Brian Conacher
- Charlie Conacher
- Bob Copp
- Mike Corrigan
- Yvon Corriveau
- Neal Coulter
- Glen Cressman
- Bob Dailey
- Bob Davidson
- Gerry Desjardins
- Kevin Devine
- Ernie Dickens
- Gary Dillon
- Wayne Dillon
- Gary Dineen
- Bruce Dowie
- Jim Drummond
- Dave Dryden
- Jerry Dupont
- Steve Durbano
- Darryl Edestrand
- Tom Edur
- Gary Edwards
- Ron Ellis
- Chris Evans
- George Ferguson
- Rick Foley
- Bob Fryday
- Dave Gardner
- Rob Garner
- Red Garrett
- Stew Gavin
- Greg Gilbert
- Ken Girard
- Brian Glennie
- Howie Glover
- Bob Goldham
- Glenn Goldup
- Hank Goldup
- Larry Goodenough
- Chris Govedaris
- Bob Gracie
- Pat Graham
- Reg Hamilton
- Gord Hannigan
- Ray Hannigan
- Nick Harbaruk
- Billy Harris b.1935
- Billy Harris b.1952
- Bob Hassard
- Don Head
- John Henderson
- Murray Henderson
- Robert (Bob) "Red" Heron
- Paul Higgins
- Ike Hildebrand
- Paul Hoganson
- Red Horner
- Mark Howe
- Marty Howe
- Brent Hughes
- John Hughes
- Ron Hurst
- Brent Imlach
- Ron Ingram
- Art Jackson
- Harvey "Busher" Jackson
- Gerry James
- Gary Jarrett
- Bill Johansen
- Trevor Johansen
- Bernie Johnston
- Greg Johnston
- Ross Johnstone
- Mike Kaszycki
- Rick Kessell
- Mike Kitchen
- Jim Kirkpatrick
- Chris Kontos
- Les Kozak
- Neil LaBatte
- Yvon Labre
- Steve Langdon
- Alex Levinsky
- Danny Lewicki
- Parker MacDonald
- Al MacNeil
- Norman Mann
- Moe Mantha
- Peter Marrin
- Jack Martin
- Tom Martin
- Dennis Maruk
- Wally Maxwell
- Tom McCarthy
- Dennis McCord
- John McCormack
- Bill McCreary Jr.
- Darwin McCutcheon
- Mike McEwen
- Donald "Sandy" McGregor
- Jim McKenny
- John McLellan
- Gerry Meehan
- Howie Menard
- Greg Meredith
- Bill Mitchell
- Red Mitchell
- Elwyn Morris
- Brian Murphy
- Mike Murphy
- Mark Napier
- Eric Nesterenko
- Bob Nevin
- Cam Newton
- Joe Noris
- Mike Nykoluk
- Peanuts O'Flaherty
- Dennis Owchar
- Mike Palmateer
- Jim Pappin
- Brad Park
- Mike Pelyk
- Jim Peplinski
- Fred Perlini
- Victor Posa
- Joe Primeau
- Ellie Pringle
- Bob Pulford
- Clare Raglan
- Mark Reeds
- Larry Regan
- Dave Reid
- Mike Richard
- Fred Robertson
- Mike Rowe
- Ron Rowe
- Enio Sclisizzi
- Rod Seiling
- Brit Selby
- Sean Shanahan
- Jack Shill
- Steve Shutt
- Al Smith
- Gary Smith
- John Smrke
- Lorne Stamler
- George Standing
- Phil Stein
- Pete Stemkowski
- Gaye Stewart
- Ron Stewart
- Frank Sullivan
- Dale Tallon
- Steve Thomas
- Bill Thoms
- Jim Thomson
- Ray Timgren
- John Tonelli
- Steve Vickers
- Carl Voss
- Mike Walton
- Don Webster
- Steve Weeks
- Bill White
- Ron Wilson
- Bennett Wolf
- John Wright
- Peter Zezel

=== Other alumni ===
- G Bob Perani - played for OHA Jr and OHA Sr teams
- D Doug Dunville - 1964-65, 1965–66

== Season-by-season results ==
Regular season and playoffs results:

Legend: GP = Games played, W = Wins, L = Losses, T = Ties, Pts = Points, GF = Goals for, GA = Goals against

Memorial Cup champions	OHL champions	OHL finalists

Season	GP	W	L	T	Pts	Win %	GF	GA	Standing	Playoffs
1937–38	12	12	0	0	24	1.000	80	27	1st, OHA	Won quarterfinal (St. Michael's Majors) 2–0 (games); Lost semifinal (Oshawa Generals) 2–1–1 (games)
1938–39	14	4	9	1	9	0.321	33	53	3rd, Group 1	Lost quarterfinal (Toronto Native Sons) 2–0 (games)
1939–40	19	11	5	3	25	0.658	106	49	2nd, OHA	Won semifinal (Guelph Biltmores) 2–1 (games); Lost OHA championship (Oshawa Generals) 3–2 (games)
1940–41	16	12	3	1	25	0.781	113	51	1st, OHA	Won semifinal (Guelph Biltmores) 3–2 (games); Lost OHA championship (Oshawa Generals) 4–3 (games)
1941–42	24	12	10	2	26	0.542	73	79	4th, OHA	Lost quarterfinal (Guelph Biltmores) 2–0 (games)
1942–43	21	8	12	1	17	0.405	105	119	6th, OHA	Lost quarterfinal (St. Michael's Majors) 2–1 (games)
1943–44	24	8	15	1	18	0.354	73	122	4th, Group 1	Did not qualify
1944–45	20	2	18	0	4	0.100	52	141	6th, OHA	Lost quarterfinal (Toronto Young Rangers) 2–0 (games)
1945–46	28	11	16	1	23	0.411	78	111	5th, OHA	Won quarterfinal (Toronto Young Rangers) 2–0 (games); Lost semifinal (Oshawa Generals) 2–0 (games)
1946–47	36	20	16	0	40	0.556	87	84	5th, OHA	Lost quarterfinal (Barrie Flyers) 2–0 (games)
1947–48	32	12	20	0	30	0.375	97	149	7th, OHA	Did not qualify
1948–49	48	20	24	4	44	0.458	168	176	6th, OHA	Won quarterfinal (Stratford Kroehlers) 2–1 (games); Won semifinal (St. Catharines Teepees) 3–0 (games); Lost OHA championship (Barrie Flyers) 4–0 (games)
1949–50	48	37	9	2	76	0.792	253	119	1st, OHA	Lost semifinal (Windsor Spitfires) 4–1 (games)
1950–51	54	32	16	6	70	0.648	220	167	2nd, OHA	Won quarterfinal (Stratford Kroehlers) 3–0 (games); Won semifinal (St. Catharines Teepees) 3–1 (games); Lost OHA championship (Barrie Flyers) 4–2 (games)
1951–52	53	39	8	6	84	0.792	302	146	1st, OHA	Lost semifinal (Guelph Biltmores) 4–2 (games)
1952–53	56	32	17	7	71	0.634	199	139	2nd, OHA	Lost semifinal (Barrie Flyers) 5–2 (games)
1953–54	59	34	18	7	75	0.636	242	160	2nd, OHA	Won quarterfinal (Kitchener Greenshirts) 3–1 (games); Won semifinal (Hamilton Tiger Cubs) 3–0–1 (games); Lost OHA championship (St. Catharines Teepees) 4–3 (games)
1954–55	49	29	17	3	61	0.622	189	142	3rd, OHA	Won quarterfinal (Galt Black Hawks) 3–1 (games); Won semifinal (Guelph Biltmores) 3–0 (games); Won OHL championship (St. Catharines Teepees) 4–2 (games); Won Eastern Canada championship (Quebec Frontenacs) 4–1–1 (games); Won 1955 Memorial Cup final (Regina Pats) 4–1 (games)
1955–56	48	23	21	4	50	0.521	174	164	4th, OHA	Won semifinal (St. Catharines Teepees) 4–1–1 (games); Won OHL championship (Barrie Flyers) 4–1 (games); Won Eastern Canada championship (Montreal Junior Canadiens) 4–3–1 (games); Won 1956 Memorial Cup final (Regina Pats) 4–0–1 (games)
1956–57	52	35	14	3	73	0.702	189	133	2nd, OHA	Won quarterfinal (Hamilton Tiger Cubs) 3–1 (games); Lost semifinal (St. Catharines Teepees) 3–2 (games)
1957–58	52	21	21	10	52	0.500	210	186	4th, OHA	Won semifinal (St. Catharines Teepees) 4–3 (games); Won OHA championship (Hamilton Tiger Cubs) 4–0–1 (games); Lost Eastern Canada championship (Ottawa-Hull Canadiens) 4–1 (games)
1958–59	54	19	27	8	46	0.426	160	213	6th, OHA	Lost quarterfinal (Guelph Biltmores) 4–1 (games)
1959–60	48	28	17	3	59	0.615	222	180	1st, OHA	Lost semifinal (St. Michael's Majors) 4–0 (games)
1960–61	48	9	30	9	27	0.281	136	211	7th, OHA	Did not qualify
1961–62 (Note: The Toronto Marlboros moved to the newly-formed Metro Junior A League for the 1961–62 season, then returned to the Ontario Hockey Association for the 1963–64 season.)	33	18	9	6	44	0.636	141	103	2nd, Metro Jr	Won semifinal (Brampton 7Ups) 4–1 (games); Lost final (St. Michael's Majors) 4–3 (games)
1962–63	40	22	12	6	50	0.625	217	159	2nd, Metro Jr	Won semifinal (Whitby Dunlops) 4–1 (games); Lost final (Neil McNeil Maroons) 4–2 (games)
1963–64	56	40	9	7	87	0.777	336	195	1st, OHA	Won semifinal (Niagara Falls Flyers) 4–0 (games); Won OHA championship (Montreal Junior Canadiens) 4–0–1 (games); Won Eastern Canada semifinal (North Bay Trappers) 4–0 (games); Won Eastern Canada championship (Montreal N.D.G. Monarchs) 3–1 (games); Won 1964 Memorial Cup final (Edmonton Oil Kings) 4–0 (games)
1964–65	56	32	17	7	71	0.634	259	222	2nd, OHA	Won quarterfinal (Montreal Junior Canadiens) 4–2–1 (games); Won semifinal (Peterborough Petes) 4–3–1 (games); Lost OHA championship (Niagara Falls Flyers) 4–1 (games)
1965–66	48	20	18	10	50	0.521	203	211	6th, OHA	Won quarterfinal (Peterborough Petes) 4–2 (games); Lost semifinal (Kitchener Rangers) 4–3–1 (games)
1966–67	48	23	15	10	56	0.583	208	184	3rd, OHA	Won quarterfinal (Montreal Junior Canadiens) 3–1–2 (games); Won semifinal (Kitchener Rangers) 4–2–1 (games); Won OHA championship (Hamilton Red Wings) 4–0 (games); Won Eastern Canada championship (Thetford Mines Canadiens) 3–1 (games); Won 1967 Memorial Cup final (Port Arthur Marrs) 4–1 (games)
1967–68	54	31	17	6	68	0.630	273	179	5th, OHA	Lost quarterfinal (Kitchener Rangers) 4–1 (games)
1968–69	54	21	27	6	48	0.444	222	239	6th, OHA	Lost quarterfinal (St. Catharines Black Hawks) 3–1–2 (games)
1969–70	54	26	17	11	63	0.583	239	201	4th, OHA	Won quarterfinal (Oshawa Generals) 4–0–1 (games); Won semifinal (London Knights) 3–0–3 (games); Lost OHA championship (Montreal Junior Canadiens) 4–3 (games)
1970–71	62	28	26	8	64	0.516	353	304	5th, OHA	Won quarterfinal (Peterborough Petes) 4–0 (games); Won semifinal (Ottawa 67's) 4–0 (games); Lost OHA championship (St. Catharines Black Hawks) 4–0 (games)
1971–72	63	45	15	3	93	0.738	363	256	1st, OHA	Won quarterfinal (Kitchener Rangers) 4–1 (games); Lost semifinal (Peterborough Petes) 4–1 (games)
1972–73	63	47	7	9	103	0.817	416	199	1st, OHA	Won quarterfinal (St. Catharines Black Hawks) 4–0 (games); Won semifinal (Ottawa 67's) 4–0 (games); Won OHA championship (Peterborough Petes) 3–2–2 (games); Won 1973 Memorial Cup final (Quebec Remparts) 9–1
1973–74	70	30	31	9	69	0.493	293	276	8th, OHA	Won quarterfinal (London Knights) 4–0–1 (games); Lost semifinal (St. Catharines Black Hawks) 4–0 (games)
1974–75	70	48	13	9	105	0.750	469	303	1st, OMJHL	Won quarterfinal (Kingston Canadians) 4–3–1 (games); Won semifinal (Sudbury Wolves) 4–3–1 (games); Won OHMJL championship (Hamilton Fincups) 4–3 (games); 2nd place in Memorial Cup Round-robin; Won 1975 Memorial Cup final (New Westminster Bruins) 7–3
1975–76	66	26	30	10	62	0.470	278	294	3rd, Emms	Won quarterfinal (London Knights) 4–1 (games); Lost semifinal (Hamilton Fincups) 4–0–1 (games)
1976–77	66	31	23	12	74	0.561	335	286	3rd, Emms	Lost quarterfinal (London Knights) 4–1–1 (games)
1977–78	68	24	36	8	56	0.412	263	341	5th, Emms	Lost first round (Kitchener Rangers) 3–2 (games)
1978–79	68	27	40	1	55	0.404	308	351	5th, Emms	Lost first round (Kitchener Rangers) 3–0 (games)
1979–80	68	33	32	3	69	0.507	342	310	2nd, Emms	Lost quarterfinal (Brantford Alexanders) 4–0 (games)
1980–81	68	31	37	0	62	0.456	298	336	4th, Emms	Lost first round (Niagara Falls Flyers) 3–2 (games)
1981–82	68	37	31	0	74	0.544	316	290	4th, Leyden	Won first round (Cornwall Royals) 2–1–2 (games); Lost Quarterfinal (Ottawa 67's) 4–1 (games)
1982–83	70	36	29	5	77	0.550	325	311	4th, Leyden	Lost first round (Cornwall Royals) 3–0–1 (games)
1983–84	70	45	24	1	91	0.650	392	317	2nd, Leyden	Won quarterfinal (Peterborough Petes) 4–1 (games); Lost semifinal (Ottawa 67's) 4–0 (games)
1984–85	66	35	28	3	73	0.553	315	302	3rd, Leyden	Lost first round (Cornwall Royals) 4–1 (games)
1985–86	66	22	41	3	47	0.356	297	345	6th, Leyden	Lost first round (Peterborough Petes) 4–0 (games)
1986–87	66	22	41	3	47	0.356	298	376	7th, Leyden	Did not qualify
1987–88	66	26	39	1	53	0.402	292	348	6th, Leyden	Lost first round (Peterborough Petes) 4–0 (games)
1988–89	66	32	31	3	67	0.508	319	332	3rd, Leyden	Lost first round (Cornwall Royals) 4–2 (games)

== Uniforms and logos ==
Team uniforms from 1980-89

In 1903 club secretary Fred Waghorne wrote to the Duke of Marlborough in England for permission to use the storied name and crest. In choosing its logo the club took the Marlborough family crown and added the initials A.C. for Athletic Club.

The Toronto Marlboros used the same colour scheme as the NHL Toronto Maple Leafs from 1927 when the two clubs came under common ownership. The Marlborough crown was originally displayed by itself on the jersey chest. It was not until the late 1950s that the crown was set against the present day Maple Leaf.

== Arenas ==
In the beginning both the Toronto Maple Leafs and the Marlboros practised and were headquartered out of the old Ravina Gardens in Toronto's west end. Home games were played downtown at the Arena Gardens.

In 1931 Maple Leaf Gardens opened up for business and the Marlboros had a new home again. In 1964 the Marlboros won the Memorial Cup on home ice, the same year the Toronto Maple Leafs won the Stanley Cup on home ice.

The Marlboros occasionally also played games in the 1970s at the North York Centennial Centre and the Markham Centennial Centre when Maple Leaf Gardens was unavailable, usually due to scheduling conflicts at MLG with both the Toronto Maple Leafs and also the Toronto Toros of the WHA. They also played part of their home schedule in the 1976–77 season in Brantford, Ontario out of the Brantford Civic Centre.

== Perpetuations ==
=== Minor hockey ===
The Toronto Marlboros Hockey Club operates several minor ice hockey teams in the Greater Toronto Hockey League (GTHL). This club operated independently to the former OHA Junior 'A' team. After the Junior 'A' team left for Hamilton, the then Maple Leafs owner Harold Ballard granted permission for the Minor Marlboros to retain the Marlborough name. Three years later in the fall of 1992 the Marlboros combined their fabled crest with the current NHL Maple Leafs' uniform.

NHL alumni of the GTHL Marlboros include Sam Gagner, Ron Handy, Mike Hough, Peter Ing, Chris Kelly, Nathan LaFayette, Connor McDavid, Rick Nash, Mike Ricci, Jason Spezza, Brian Wilks, Wojtek Wolski and John Tavares.

=== American Hockey League ===
When Maple Leaf Sports & Entertainment decided to relocate their American Hockey League minor league team, the St. John's Maple Leafs to Toronto, they renamed the team the Toronto Marlies after the original Toronto Marlboros club.
