= Metro Junior Hockey League =

Metro Junior Hockey League may refer to:

- Metro Junior A League, a Junior 'A' hockey league 1961–1963 that operated in association with the Ontario Hockey Association
- Metro Junior A Hockey League, a Junior 'A' hockey league 1991–1998 that was later absorbed by the Ontario Provincial Junior A Hockey League

== See also ==
- Metropolitan Junior Hockey League, an American Tier III Junior ice hockey league with teams in the eastern U.S., renamed as North American 3 Atlantic Hockey League (NA3AHL) for the 2016–17 season
