= Andre Champagne =

Canadian ice hockey player (1943–2025)

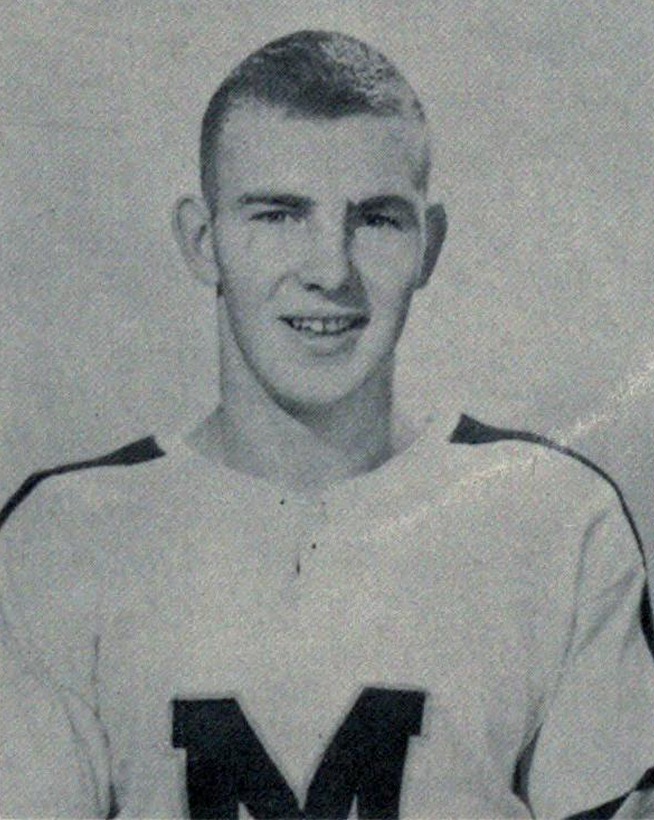
- Champagne at St. Michaels College, c. 1962
- Born: September 19, 1943 Eastview, Ontario, Canada
- Died: September 3, 2025 (aged 81) Tulsa, Oklahoma, U.S.
- Height: 6 ft 0 in (183 cm)
- Weight: 190 lb (86 kg; 13 st 8 lb)
- Position: Left wing
- Shot: Left
- Played for: Toronto Maple Leafs
- Playing career: 1962–1970

Andre Joseph Jacques Orius Champagne (September 19, 1943 – September 3, 2025) was a Canadian professional ice hockey left winger. He played 2 games in the National Hockey League (NHL) for the Toronto Maple Leafs during the 1962–63 season. The rest of his career, which lasted from 1962 to 1970, was spent in the minor leagues.

Champagne died in Tulsa, Oklahoma on September 3, 2025, at the age of 81.

== Career statistics ==
=== Regular season and playoffs ===
			Regular season					Playoffs
Season	Team	League	GP	G	A	Pts	PIM	GP	G	A	Pts	PIM
1959–60	St. Michael's Majors	OHA	1	0	0	0	0	—	—	—	—	—
1960–61	St. Michael's Majors	OHA	47	11	12	23	59	18	7	2	9	22
1960–61	St. Michael's Majors	M-Cup	—	—	—	—	—	9	10	11	21	6
1961–62	St. Michael's Majors	OHA	29	14	18	32	79	3	1	4	5	26
1962–63	Toronto Maple Leafs	NHL	2	0	0	0	0	—	—	—	—	—
1962–63	Toronto Neil McNeil Maroons	MetJAHL	24	16	32	48	61	10	8	12	20	37
1962–63	Rochester Americans	AHL	—	—	—	—	—	1	0	0	0	0
1962–63	Toronto Neil McNeil Maroons	M-Cup	—	—	—	—	—	6	3	2	5	30
1963–64	Toronto Marlboros	OHA	47	31	40	71	105	9	6	10	16	38
1963–64	Rochester Americans	AHL	3	0	0	0	0	—	—	—	—	—
1963–64	Toronto Marlboros	M-Cup	—	—	—	—	—	12	7	11	18	61
1964–65	Tulsa Oilers	CPHL	60	24	41	65	118	12	3	4	7	43
1965–66	Rochester Americans	AHL	1	0	0	0	0	—	—	—	—	—
1965–66	Tulsa Oilers	CPHL	65	16	49	65	38	11	1	5	6	4
1966–67	Tulsa Oilers	CPHL	10	1	2	3	6	—	—	—	—	—
1967–68	Rochester Americans	AHL	48	2	5	7	14	—	—	—	—	—
1968–69	Rochester Americans	AHL	69	7	12	19	78	—	—	—	—	—
1969–70	Rochester Americans	AHL	24	3	5	8	25	—	—	—	—	—
AHL totals			145	12	22	34	117	1	0	0	0	0
CPHL totals			135	41	92	133	162	23	4	9	13	47
NHL totals			2	0	0	0	0	—	—	—	—	—
