= Rod Seiling =

Canadian ice hockey player (born 1944)

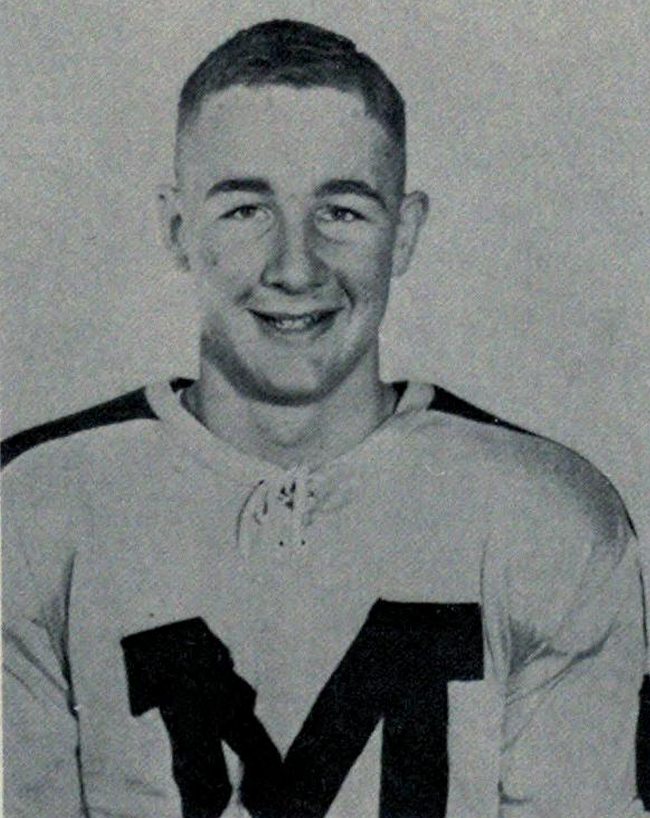
- Seiling playing for St. Michael's College in 1962
- Born: November 14, 1944 (age 81) Elmira, Ontario, Canada
- Height: 6 ft 0 in (183 cm)
- Weight: 182 lb (83 kg; 13 st 0 lb)
- Position: Defence
- Shot: Left
- Played for: Toronto Maple Leafs; New York Rangers; Washington Capitals; St. Louis Blues; Atlanta Flames
- National team: Canada
- Playing career: 1962–1979

Rodney Albert Seiling (born November 14, 1944) is a Canadian former professional ice hockey defenceman. Rod is the brother of Ric Seiling.

== Playing career ==
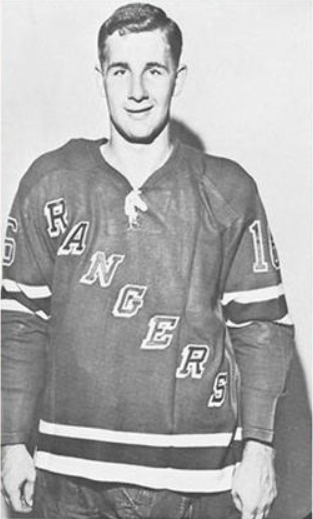
Rod Seiling in 1960s photo for New York Rangers

Signed by the Toronto Maple Leafs in 1962, Seiling played only one game with the Leafs and spent most of his time as a Toronto prospect in the minors. The next year, he represented Canada at the 1964 Winter Olympics, where they finished in fourth place. He was traded to the New York Rangers, where he would remain for the next decade, except for a brief claim by the St. Louis Blues in the 1967 NHL Expansion Draft, after which he was immediately traded back to the Rangers. His defensive abilities eventually helped guide the Rangers to the 1972 Stanley Cup Finals. He was a member of Team Canada in the 1972 Summit Series. He was also an all-star for the only time in his career in 1972.

In 1974, he was claimed on waivers by the Washington Capitals, but after appearing in just one game with Washington he was traded to the Maple Leafs. Seiling also played for the Blues and Atlanta Flames before retiring at the end of the 1978–79 NHL season.

== Post-playing career ==
In 2006, Seiling was appointed Chair of the Ontario Racing Commission, where he served for 7 years.

In the 2009 book 100 Ranger Greats, the authors ranked Seiling at No. 41 all-time of the 901 New York Rangers who had played during the team's first 82 seasons.

== Career statistics ==
=== Regular season and playoffs ===
			Regular season					Playoffs
Season	Team	League	GP	G	A	Pts	PIM	GP	G	A	Pts	PIM
1960–61	St. Michael's Buzzers	MetJHL	—	—	—	—	—	—	—	—	—	—
1960–61	St. Michael's Majors	OHA-Jr.	3	0	0	0	2	4	0	0	0	0
1961–62	St. Michael's Majors	OHA-Jr.	31	24	26	50	14	4	2	1	3	0
1961–62	St. Michael's Majors	MC	—	—	—	—	—	5	2	2	4	11
1962–63	Neil McNeil Maroons	MetJL	38	29	48	77	32	10	4	10	14	14
1962–63	Toronto Maple Leafs	NHL	1	0	1	1	0	—	—	—	—	—
1962–63	Sudbury Wolves	EPHL	3	2	2	4	0	—	—	—	—	—
1962–63	Rochester Americans	AHL	1	1	0	1	0	—	—	—	—	—
1962–63	Neil McNeil Maroons	MC	—	—	—	—	—	6	1	3	4	2
1963–64	Toronto Marlboros	OHA-Jr.	41	13	54	67	74	9	5	14	19	14
1963–64	Rochester Americans	AHL	2	0	0	0	0	—	—	—	—	—
1963–64	New York Rangers	NHL	2	0	1	1	0	—	—	—	—	—
1963–64	Toronto Marlboros	MC	—	—	—	—	—	10	7	7	14	10
1964–65	New York Rangers	NHL	68	4	22	26	44	—	—	—	—	—
1965–66	New York Rangers	NHL	52	5	10	15	24	—	—	—	—	—
1965–66	Minnesota Rangers	CPHL	13	3	5	8	4	—	—	—	—	—
1966–67	New York Rangers	NHL	12	1	1	2	6	—	—	—	—	—
1966–67	Baltimore Clippers	AHL	46	10	20	30	38	9	2	2	4	14
1967–68	New York Rangers	NHL	71	5	11	16	44	6	1	1	2	4
1968–69	New York Rangers	NHL	73	4	17	21	73	4	1	0	1	2
1969–70	New York Rangers	NHL	76	5	21	26	68	2	0	0	0	0
1970–71	New York Rangers	NHL	68	5	22	27	34	13	1	0	1	12
1971–72	New York Rangers	NHL	78	5	36	41	62	16	1	4	5	10
1972–73	New York Rangers	NHL	72	9	33	42	36	—	—	—	—	—
1973–74	New York Rangers	NHL	68	7	23	30	32	13	0	2	2	19
1974–75	New York Rangers	NHL	4	0	1	1	0	—	—	—	—	—
1974–75	Washington Capitals	NHL	1	0	0	0	0	—	—	—	—	—
1974–75	Toronto Maple Leafs	NHL	60	5	12	17	40	7	0	0	0	0
1975–76	Toronto Maple Leafs	NHL	77	3	16	19	46	10	0	1	1	6
1976–77	St. Louis Blues	NHL	79	3	26	29	36	4	0	0	0	2
1977–78	St. Louis Blues	NHL	78	1	11	12	40	—	—	—	—	—
1978–79	St. Louis Blues	NHL	3	0	1	1	4	—	—	—	—	—
1978–79	Atlanta Flames	NHL	36	0	4	4	12	2	0	0	0	0
NHL totals			979	62	269	331	601	77	4	8	12	55

=== International ===
Year	Team	Event	GP	G	A	Pts	PIM
1964	Canada	OLY	7	4	2	6	6
1972	Canada	SS	3	0	0	0	0
Senior totals			10	4	2	6	6
