= 1964 Memorial Cup =

Canadian junior ice hockey championship

The Memorial Cup trophy

The 1964 Memorial Cup final was the 46th junior ice hockey championship of the Canadian Amateur Hockey Association (CAHA). The George Richardson Memorial Trophy champions Toronto Marlboros of the Ontario Hockey Association in Eastern Canada competed against the Abbott Cup champions Edmonton Oil Kings of the Central Alberta Hockey League in Western Canada. In a best-of-seven series, held at Maple Leaf Gardens in Toronto, Ontario, Toronto won their 4th Memorial Cup, defeating Edmonton 4 games to 0.

The CAHA was concerned about the quality of Memorial Cup competition due to the rapid expansion in junior ice hockey, and named Lionel Fleury chairman of a committee to investigate the imbalance the competition in Eastern Canada and find a solution to include all branches of the CAHA in the national playoffs. During the 1963 Memorial Cup playoffs, when the junior champions from the Quebec Amateur Hockey Association and the Maritime Amateur Hockey Association declined to participate and complained that the national deadlines did not allow adequate time to decide their leagues' champions. Fleury opted to change the format of the playoffs from an elimination bracket into a round-robin format to reduce travel costs. He scheduled a three-team round-robin series for the champions of the Maritimes, Quebec and the Ottawa and District Amateur Hockey Association in 1964. After the Summerside Legionnaires lost their first two games by scores of 9–1 and 15–0, Fleury felt there was no point in continuing the series. The team withdrew but protested that they should have been allowed to play, and demanded money to cover their travel expenses to Montreal for the series.

CAHA president Art Potter oversaw scheduling for the final Memorial Cup series, and disagreed with the Gardens' management who demanded more money for radio broadcast rights and refused entry to some broadcasters. Potter stated that the CAHA reserved all rights, but that there was little he could do since the CAHA had a different contract with the Gardens. Potter said it was a financial failure since Gardens' management priced the tickets too high. He recommended that future Memorial Cup finals alternate between the arenas of the participating teams, and that playoffs be shortened for the final to be played in April rather than in May.

== Scores ==
- Game 1: Toronto 5-2 Edmonton
- Game 2: Toronto 3-2 Edmonton
- Game 3: Toronto 5-2 Edmonton
- Game 4: Toronto 7-2 Edmonton

== Winning roster ==
Wayne Carleton, Andre Champagne, Jack Chipchase, Gary Dineen, Ray Dupont, Ron Ellis, Nick Harbaruk, Bill Henderson, Paul Laurent, Jim McKenny, Grant Moore, Rod Seiling, Brit Selby, Gary Smith, Pete Stemkowski, Mike Walton, Bill Watson, Ray Winterstein. Coach: Jim Gregory
