= Mike Walton =

Canadian ice hockey player (born 1945)

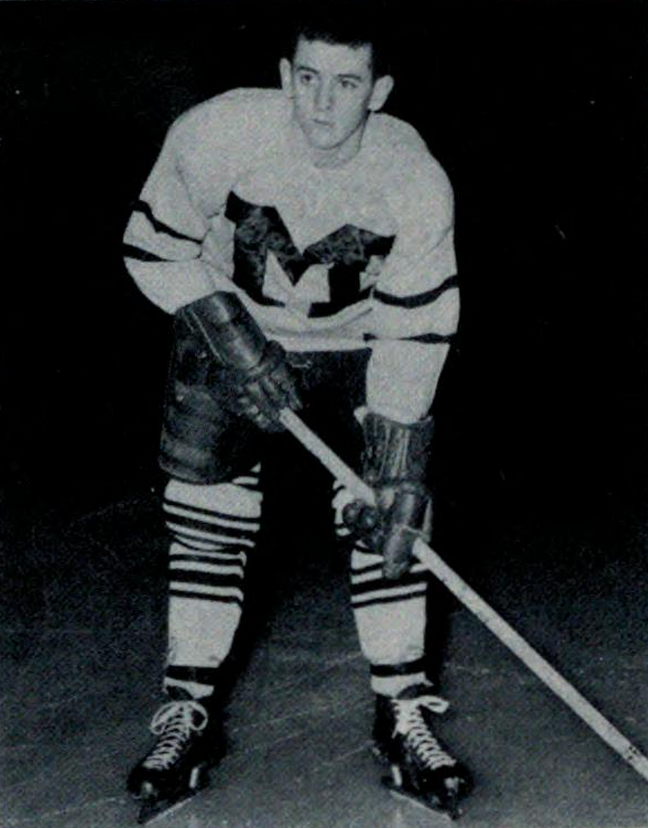
- Walton at St. Michael's College, c. 1962
- Born: January 3, 1945 (age 81) Kirkland Lake, Ontario, Canada
- Height: 5 ft 10 in (178 cm)
- Weight: 175 lb (79 kg; 12 st 7 lb)
- Position: Centre
- Shot: Left
- Played for: Toronto Maple Leafs; Boston Bruins; Minnesota Fighting Saints; Vancouver Canucks; St. Louis Blues; Chicago Black Hawks; Kölner EC
- National team: Canada
- Playing career: 1965–1980

Michael Robert Walton (born January 3, 1945) is a Canadian former professional ice hockey player. Walton played forward in the National Hockey League (NHL) and World Hockey Association (WHA) from 1965 until 1979.

== Early years ==
Walton was born in Kirkland Lake, Ontario, but his family lived a transient existence during his youth before settling north of Toronto, Ontario. They operated a restaurant/garage in Sutton, about 50 kilometres (31 mi) north of the city. He inherited his nickname "Shakey" from his father, Bob Walton, who would shake his head to throw off opponents as a hockey player in England.

He spent each of his first two years of junior hockey with the only two champions in the Metro Junior A League's brief history. He first attended St. Michael's College School on a partial scholarship. When the Majors' famous hockey program was discontinued after the 1961–62 season, Walton and the rest of the players were transferred to Neil McNeil Catholic Secondary School, where he scored 22 goals in 38 games for the Maroons in 1962–63.

== Playing career ==
=== Toronto Maple Leafs ===
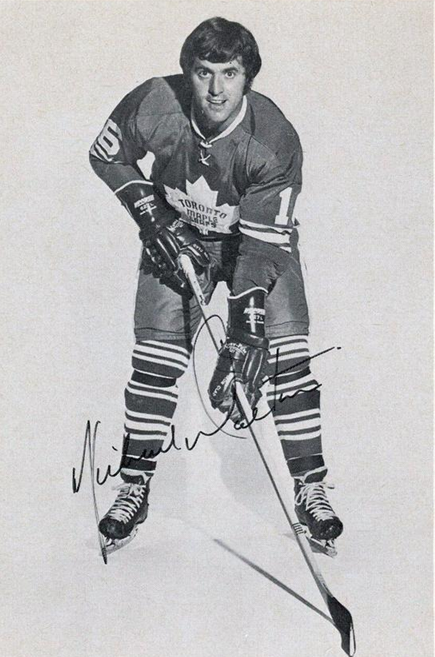
Walton for Toronto in 1970–71 season

He became a part of the Toronto Maple Leafs' talent pipeline when he joined its Ontario Hockey Association farm team, the Marlboros, where he was the club's second leading scorer with 92 points (41 goals, 51 assists) in 53 games, while helping them win the league championship and Memorial Cup in 1964. He then earned back-to-back minor league Rookie of the Year honours, first with the Tulsa Oilers of the Central Professional Hockey League (CPHL) in 1965, then with the Calder Cup-winning Rochester Americans of the American Hockey League (AHL) in 1966.

Walton made his Leafs debut in 1965–66, appearing in only six matches. He established himself on the veteran-dominated team midway through the next campaign. Working exclusively on power-play situations, he scored four goals with three assists while playing in all twelve games of Toronto's postseason run to the 1967 Stanley Cup Championship. He was the club's leading scorer with 59 points (30 goals, 29 assists) in 1967–68, his first full season in the league and most productive with the Leafs.

His time with the Leafs was marred by constant conflict with head coach Punch Imlach and team president Stafford Smythe. Prior to his dismissal in April 1969, the domineering Imlach, disdainful of younger players, clashed with Walton over his hairstyle and bombarded him with negative comments about his on-ice performance. Also at issue was the fact that Walton's agent was Alan Eagleson, who helped establish the NHL Players' Association. Further complicating matters was Walton's marriage to Smythe's niece, and Conn Smythe's granddaughter, Candace. When an independent psychiatrist appointed by the NHL diagnosed Walton with depression in the middle of the 1970–71 season, his departure from the Leafs was imminent.

=== Boston Bruins ===
Walton was traded by Toronto to the defending Stanley Cup Champion Boston Bruins as part of a three-way deal which also involved the Philadelphia Flyers on January 31, 1971. The Maple Leafs received Bernie Parent and a second-round pick in the 1971 NHL Amateur Draft (Rick Kehoe) from the Flyers who got Bruce Gamble and a first-round selection (Pierre Plante) in the same draft from the Leafs and Rick MacLeish and Danny Schock from the Bruins.

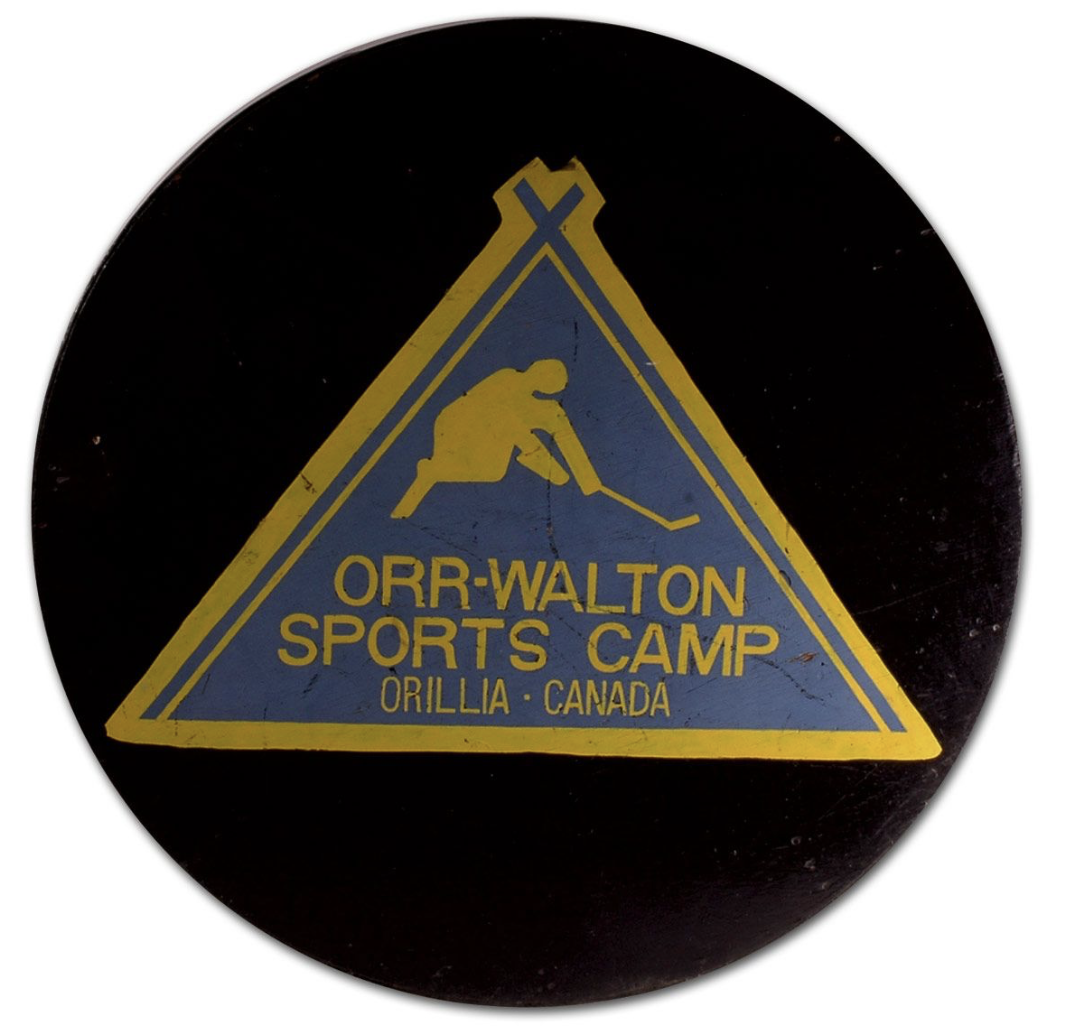
Orr-Walton Sports Camp

Walton blended in well with the Bruins' prolific scorers led by Phil Esposito and Bobby Orr, his business partner at the time with the Orr-Walton Sports Camp in Orillia, Ontario. He became a part of his second Championship when the Bruins defeated the New York Rangers in the 1972 Final.

He was injured in a bizarre accident in the middle of the 1972–73 season on January 3, 1973, when he tripped and fell through a plate glass door at a St. Louis hotel. Despite needing over 100 stitches, he made a complete recovery and returned to action a month later.

=== Minnesota Fighting Saints ===
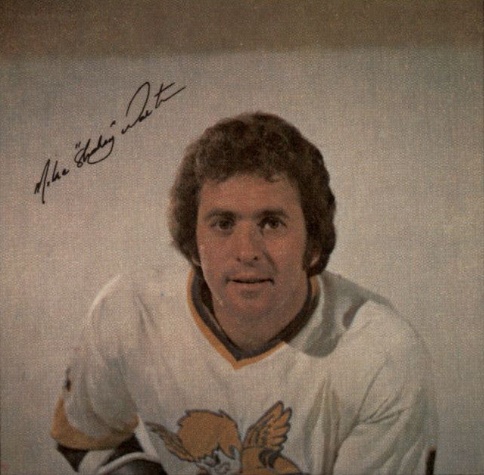
1974–75 card of Walton for Minnesota Fighting Saints

The upstart World Hockey Association, attempting to lure talent away from the established league, conducted its General Player Draft on February 12, 1972, to evenly distribute amongst its franchises NHL players with expiring contracts. Even though still under contract with the Bruins, Walton was selected by the Los Angeles Sharks. His WHA rights were traded in June 1973 to the Minnesota Fighting Saints, who succeeded in signing him to a three-year deal worth $450,000.

He made an immediate impact as the WHA's leading scorer with a career-high 117 points (57 goals, 60 assists) in 1973–74. He continued as the team's top scorer for the next two seasons, but left the team on February 25, 1976, three days before financial problems forced the Fighting Saints to cease operations.

He also played for Team Canada when it lost the 1974 Summit Series to the Soviet Union 1–4–3. Observers considered his performance to be the biggest disappointment in the series.

=== Later career ===
Walton returned to the NHL to finish his 1975–76 campaign, but it was not with the Bruins. Two years earlier on February 7, 1974, they had traded his NHL rights, along with Chris Oddleifson and Fred O'Donnell, to the Vancouver Canucks for Bobby Schmautz. Even though his 66 points (29 goals, 37 assists) in 1977–78 led the Canucks and were the best numbers in his NHL career, he was still dealt to the St. Louis Blues on June 12, 1978. His subsequent season was split between the Blues, Bruins, Chicago Black Hawks and the latter two's AHL affiliates. His final year of professional hockey in 1979–80 was spent with Kölner EC of the Eishockey-Bundesliga in West Germany.

== Personal life ==
Walton is married to Candace, and has three daughters: Connie, JJ and Michelle. After his retirement from professional hockey, Walton worked as a real estate agent for RE/MAX in Toronto. His clients included active and former Leafs players, such as Doug Gilmour and Mats Sundin. He was the eponymous and initial proprietor of Shakey's Original Bar and Grill on Bloor Street in the western part of the city.

== Awards ==
- 1964 J. Ross Robertson Cup Championship (OHA) – Toronto Marlboros
- 1964 Memorial Cup Championship – Toronto Marlboros
- 1965 Ken McKenzie Trophy (Rookie of the Year – CPHL) – Tulsa Oilers
- 1966 Dudley "Red" Garrett Memorial Award (Rookie of the Year – AHL) – Rochester Americans
- 1966 Calder Cup Championship (AHL) – Rochester Americans
- 1967 Stanley Cup Championship – Toronto Maple Leafs
- 1968 NHL All Star – Toronto Maple Leafs
- 1972 Stanley Cup Championship – Boston Bruins
- WHA second team all star 1974
- Played in the WHA all star game in 1974, 1975 and 1976
- 1974 Bill Hunter Trophy (Scoring Leader – WHA) – Minnesota Fighting Saints
- 2010 Inaugural member of the World Hockey Association Hall of Fame

== Career statistics ==
=== Regular season and playoffs ===
			Regular season					Playoffs
Season	Team	League	GP	G	A	Pts	PIM	GP	G	A	Pts	PIM
1961–62	St. Michael's Majors	OHA-Jr.	26	13	11	24	12	12	7	7	14	10
1961–62	St. Michael's Majors	MC	—	—	—	—	—	5	1	0	1	6
1962–63	Neil McNeil Maroons	MetJHL	38	22	22	44	32	8	4	3	7	10
1962–63	Neil McNeil Maroons	MC	—	—	—	—	—	6	4	1	5	13
1963–64	Toronto Marlboros	OHA-Jr.	53	41	51	92	62	9	6	9	15	6
1963–64	Rochester Americans	AHL	2	0	0	0	0	—	—	—	—	—
1963–64	Toronto Marlboros	MC	—	—	—	—	—	12	6	20	26	11
1964–65	Tulsa Oilers	CPHL	68	40	44	84	86	12	7	6	13	16
1965–66	Toronto Maple Leafs	NHL	6	1	3	4	0	—	—	—	—	—
1965–66	Rochester Americans	AHL	68	35	51	86	67	12	8	4	12	43
1966–67	Toronto Maple Leafs	NHL	31	7	10	17	13	12	4	3	7	2
1966–67	Rochester Americans	AHL	36	19	33	52	28	—	—	—	—	—
1967–68	Toronto Maple Leafs	NHL	73	30	29	59	48	—	—	—	—	—
1968–69	Toronto Maple Leafs	NHL	66	22	21	43	34	4	0	0	0	4
1969–70	Toronto Maple Leafs	NHL	58	21	34	55	68	—	—	—	—	—
1970–71	Toronto Maple Leafs	NHL	23	3	10	13	21	—	—	—	—	—
1970–71	Boston Bruins	NHL	22	3	5	8	10	5	2	0	2	19
1971–72	Boston Bruins	NHL	76	28	28	56	45	15	6	6	12	13
1972–73	Boston Bruins	NHL	56	25	22	47	37	5	1	1	2	2
1973–74	Minnesota Fighting Saints	WHA	78	57	60	117	88	11	10	8	18	6
1974–75	Minnesota Fighting Saints	WHA	78	48	45	93	33	12	10	7	17	10
1975–76	Minnesota Fighting Saints	WHA	58	31	40	71	27	—	—	—	—	—
1975–76	Vancouver Canucks	NHL	10	8	8	16	9	2	0	0	0	5
1976–77	Vancouver Canucks	NHL	40	7	24	31	32	—	—	—	—	—
1977–78	Vancouver Canucks	NHL	65	29	37	66	30	—	—	—	—	—
1978–79	St. Louis Blues	NHL	22	7	11	18	6	—	—	—	—	—
1978–79	Boston Bruins	NHL	14	4	2	6	0	—	—	—	—	—
1978–79	Rochester Americans	AHL	1	1	2	3	2	—	—	—	—	—
1978–79	Chicago Black Hawks	NHL	26	6	3	9	4	4	1	0	1	0
1978–79	New Brunswick Hawks	AHL	7	1	5	6	6	—	—	—	—	—
1979–80	Kölner EC	1.GBun	20	12	19	31	33	—	—	—	—	—
NHL totals			588	201	247	448	357	47	14	10	24	45
WHA totals			211	136	145	281	148	23	20	15	35	26

=== International ===
Year	Team	Event	GP	G	A	Pts	PIM
1974	Canada	SS	6	0	1	1	2

== Bibliography ==
- Cox, Damien & Stellick, Gord. '67: The Maple Leafs, Their Sensational Victory, and The End of an Empire. Toronto, ON: John Wiley & Sons Canada Ltd., 2004.
- Leonetti, Mike & Barkley, Harold. The Game We Knew: Hockey in the Sixties. Vancouver, BC: Raincoast Books, 1998.
- Willes, Ed. The Rebel League: The Short and Unruly Life of the World Hockey Association. Toronto, ON: McClelland & Stewart Ltd., 2004.
