= Gary Smith (ice hockey) =

Canadian ice hockey player (born 1944)

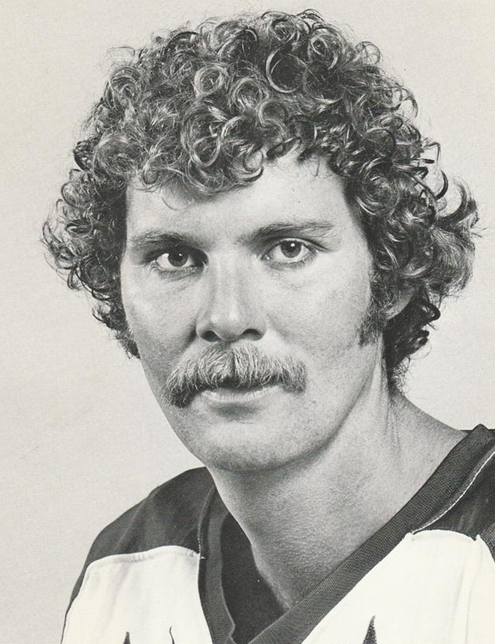
- Born: February 4, 1944 (age 82) Ottawa, Ontario, Canada
- Height: 6 ft 4 in (193 cm)
- Weight: 205 lb (93 kg; 14 st 9 lb)
- Position: Goaltender
- Caught: Left
- Played for: Toronto Maple Leafs; Oakland Seals; California Golden Seals; Chicago Black Hawks; Vancouver Canucks; Minnesota North Stars; Washington Capitals; Indianapolis Racers; Winnipeg Jets
- Playing career: 1965–1980

Gary Edward Smith (born February 4, 1944) is a Canadian former professional ice hockey goaltender. Gary is a son of Des Smith and brother of Brian Smith, both former National Hockey League (NHL) players. Smith played for numerous clubs, including the Chicago Black Hawks, Oakland/California Seals, Toronto Maple Leafs, Vancouver Canucks, Washington Capitals and Winnipeg Jets. He was the co-winner of the Vezina Trophy in the 1971–72 season. Near the end of his career, Smith played for the World Hockey Association in its last season of operation in 1978–79. He played eleven games as the goaltender for the Indianapolis Racers. He went winless in eleven starts and was out of the team by January of 1979. However, at the urging of his wife, he inquired if the Winnipeg Jets were looking for some help after they had lost a game 10-1; two weeks later, the Jets called to see if he was ready to play hockey, which he agreed to. He started ten games and won seven of them before being tabbed to start the 1979 WHA playoffs. He won eight of his ten starts as the Jets won the Avco World Trophy. Smith closed his career out the following year with the Jets in the NHL and the Tulsa Oilers of the Central Hockey League.

== Playing career ==
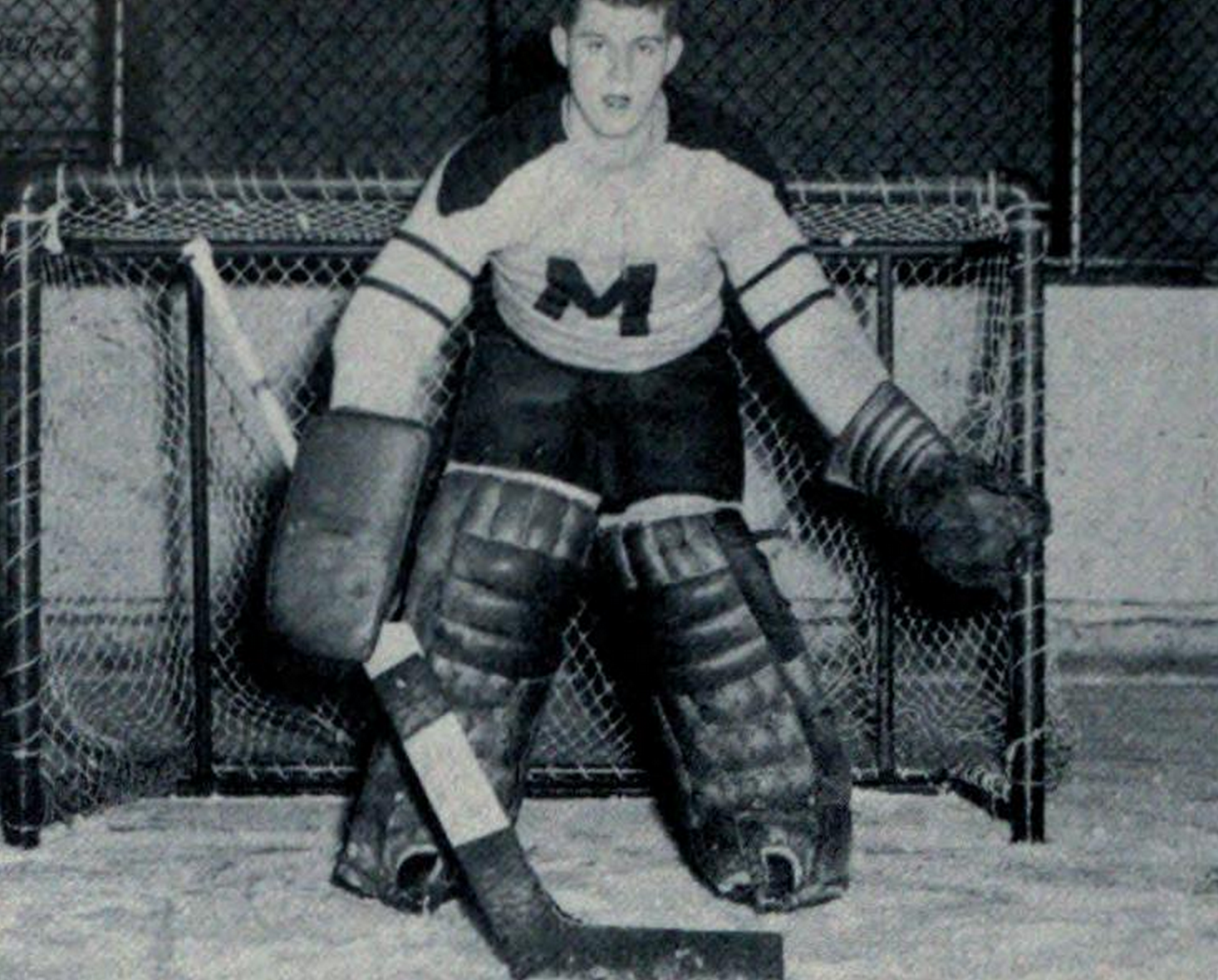
Smith with the Toronto St. Michael's Majors, c. 1962

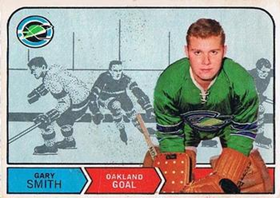
1968-69 card of Gary Smith for Oakland Seals

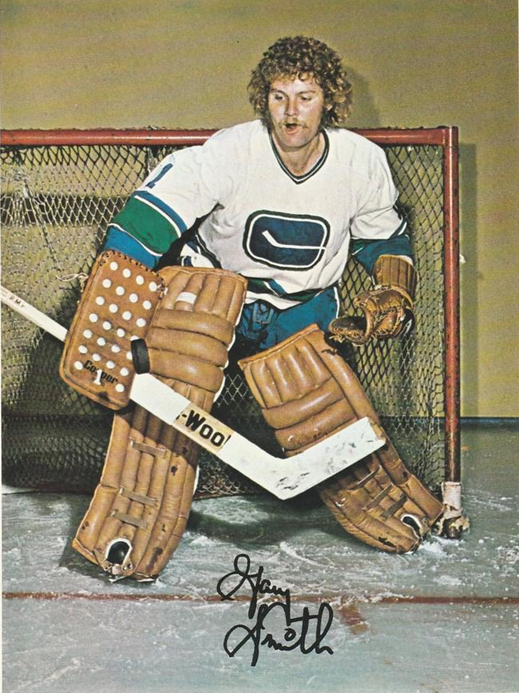
Gary Smith in 1973 photo for Vancouver Canucks

Smith played his junior hockey with the Toronto St. Michael's Majors, Toronto Neil McNeil Maroons and the Toronto Marlboros. He won a Memorial Cup with the Toronto Marlboros in 1964. Smith made his NHL debut with the Toronto Maple Leafs in the 1965-66 NHL season, and was one of five goalies who played for the Maple Leafs during 1966–67, their most recent Stanley Cup season.

In his first season with Toronto, Smith left his crease in a game against the Montreal Canadiens in an attempt to be the first NHL goalie to score a goal. He reached the Canadiens' blueline before J. C. Tremblay issued a heavy bodycheck. The NHL subsequently introduced a rule prohibiting the goaltender from being involved in play after crossing the center red line. On occasion, Smith continued to attempt to score from within his side of the red line.

He was eventually given the nickname "Suitcase" Smith by Toronto Star journalist Red Burnett due to the large number of teams for which he played; Smith disliked the nickname, stating that his friends called him "Axe". After playing with the dismal California Golden Seals from 1967–68 to 1970–71, with whom he set records in 1970–71 for both the most games played in a single season and most losses in a single season, his first success was sharing the 1971–72 Vezina Trophy with Tony Esposito while with the Chicago Black Hawks. One year later, Smith and Esposito helped lead the Black Hawks to the Stanley Cup Finals, which they lost to the Montreal Canadiens in six games.

In 1974–75, he had a fine season with the Vancouver Canucks, with 72 games played and six shutouts. Smith finished fifth place in balloting for the 1975 Hart Memorial Trophy, awarded to the player judged most valuable to his team. The ultimate winner, Bobby Clarke, said in his acceptance speech that Smith was more deserving of the award. The following season, after giving up five goals to the Pittsburgh Penguins, Smith was pulled from the game but rather than stay on the bench he left the Pacific Coliseum and drove home still wearing his equipment. He was suspended indefinitely by the team, later reduced to five games, and later said "It's tough driving in your skates."

Smith later played in the World Hockey Association (WHA), and was a teammate and roommate of Wayne Gretzky while playing for the Indianapolis Racers, where he went 0-10-1 before being shifted over to Winnipeg. He played in ten games later in the 1978-79 season and won seven of them leading up to the 1979 WHA playoffs. In ten starts as goaltender, Smith won eight of them as a key part of the Winnipeg Jets' 1979 Avco World Trophy championship run against the Edmonton Oilers, who were led by Gretzky. Coincidentally, when Gretzky attended his first NHL game at Maple Leaf Gardens, Smith played for the California Golden Seals against the Maple Leafs. While Smith did not have the best relationship with McVie in Washington, the coach did defend him in the press in 1979; Oilers coach Glen Sather raged that Smith "had his stick in front of our guys' faces", accusing the referees of letting him get away from it, while McVie called him "an old time goalie who likes to establish his domain." Smith gave up the last goal in WHA history to Dave Semenko. According to Smith, the last goal scored in the WHA by Dave Semenko was let in on purpose: “The score was 7-2 and Semenko was punching me and elbowing me in front of the net. I went over to the referee and said, ‘You’re not going to give this asshole a penalty for hitting me over the head with his elbows and his stick, I’m just going to let him score.'” Smith's last coach in Winnipeg was Tom McVie, who coached Smith the previous season while both were with the Washington Capitals.

Smith was noted for his ritual of removing his entire uniform and goaltending gear between periods and putting it all back on again. He claimed his skate boots would stretch in size, forcing him to wear as many as 13 pairs of socks at times. He performed his undressing routine throughout his career as an active player, even after resolving his skate boot issues.

Smith was also known for punting the puck down the ice, allegedly in at attempt to hit the scoreclock.

== Personal life ==
His brother Brian was also a professional hockey player, and on December 19, 1967 Brian's Los Angeles Kings played Gary's Oakland Seals, and Gary gave up two goals to his brother. Brian later became a television sports news anchor in Ottawa, until he was murdered in 1995. In 1996 Gary, at the time a process server in Vancouver, was one of many former players who received a court settlement for pension payments owed by the league, and announced his intention to purchase a racehorse he would name Broadcaster, in honour of his brother.

Gary currently resides in Del Mar, California and continues to manage his horses.

== Awards and achievements ==
- Memorial Cup championship in 1964
- Calder Cup championship in 1966
- Vezina Trophy winner in 1972 (shared with Tony Esposito).
- Played in 1975 NHL All-Star Game
- Avco World Trophy championship in 1979
- Holds NHL record for most losses in a season (48 in 1971)

== Career statistics ==
=== Regular season and playoffs ===
Bold indicates led league
Bold italics indicate NHL record

			Regular season									Playoffs
Season	Team	League	GP	W	L	T	MIN	GA	SO	GAA	SV%	GP	W	L	MIN	GA	SO	GAA	SV%
1961–62	Toronto St. Michael's Majors	OHA-Jr.	31	24	6	1	1860	83	3	2.68	—	12	—	—	720	36	0	3.00	—
1961–62	Toronto St. Michael's Majors	M-Cup	—	—	—	—	—	—	—	—	—	4	0	3	182	20	0	6.59	—
1962–63	Neil McNeil Maroons	MetJHL	28	—	—	—	1660	65	3	2.25	—	10	—	—	600	40	0	4.00	—
1962–63	Neil McNeil Maroons	M-Cup	—	—	—	—	—	—	—	—	—	6	2	4	360	27	0	4.50	—
1963–64	Toronto Marlboros	OHA-Jr.	55	40	8	7	3270	186	3	3.41	—	9	—	—	540	26	1	2.89	—
1963–64	Toronto Marlboros	M-Cup	—	—	—	—	—	—	—	—	—	12	11	1	720	38	0	3.17	—
1964–65	Rochester Americans	AHL	1	0	0	0	2	0	0	0.00	—	—	—	—	—	—	—	—	—
1964–65	Tulsa Oilers	CPHL	1	0	1	0	60	5	0	5.00	—	—	—	—	—	—	—	—	—
1964–65	Victoria Maple Leafs	WHL	8	1	5	0	411	30	0	4.38	—	—	—	—	—	—	—	—	—
1965–66	Rochester Americans	AHL	37	20	11	4	2038	97	2	2.86	—	4	2	2	188	12	0	3.83	—
1965–66	Toronto Maple Leafs	NHL	3	0	2	0	118	7	0	3.56	.896	—	—	—	—	—	—	—	—
1966–67	Rochester Americans	AHL	17	6	5	4	871	38	1	2.62	—	—	—	—	—	—	—	—	—
1966–67	Victoria Maple Leafs	WHL	17	6	8	3	1029	51	2	2.97	—	—	—	—	—	—	—	—	—
1966–67	Toronto Maple Leafs	NHL	2	0	2	0	115	7	0	3.65	.892	—	—	—	—	—	—	—	—
1967–68	Oakland Seals	NHL	21	2	13	4	1129	60	1	3.19	.907	—	—	—	—	—	—	—	—
1968–69	Oakland Seals	NHL	54	21	24	7	2993	148	4	2.97	.905	7	3	**4**	420	23	0	3.29	.899
1969–70	Oakland Seals	NHL	65	19	**34**	12	3762	**195**	2	3.11	.913	4	0	**4**	248	13	0	3.15	.903
1970–71	California Golden Seals	NHL	**71**	19	**48**	4	**3975**	**256**	2	3.86	.884	—	—	—	—	—	—	—	—
1971–72	Chicago Black Hawks	NHL	28	14	5	6	1540	62	5	2.42	.911	2	1	1	120	3	1	**1.50**	.957
1972–73	Chicago Black Hawks	NHL	23	10	10	2	1340	79	0	3.54	.887	2	0	1	65	5	0	4.62	.884
1973–74	Vancouver Canucks	NHL	66	20	**33**	8	3632	**208**	3	3.44	.894	—	—	—	—	—	—	—	—
1974–75	Vancouver Canucks	NHL	**72**	32	24	9	3823	197	6	3.09	.895	4	1	3	257	14	0	3.27	.905
1975–76	Vancouver Canucks	NHL	51	20	24	6	2864	167	2	3.50	.882	—	—	—	—	—	—	—	—
1976–77	Minnesota North Stars	NHL	36	10	17	8	2090	139	1	3.99	.881	1	0	0	43	4	0	5.58	.733
1977–78	Washington Capitals	NHL	17	2	12	3	980	68	2	4.16	.864	—	—	—	—	—	—	—	—
1977–78	Hershey Bears	AHL	1	0	0	1	65	4	0	3.69	—	—	—	—	—	—	—	—	—
1977–78	Minnesota North Stars	NHL	3	0	2	1	180	9	0	3.00	.907	—	—	—	—	—	—	—	—
1977–78	Fort Worth Texans	CHL	13	8	3	1	765	38	1	2.98	—	—	—	—	—	—	—	—	—
1978–79	Indianapolis Racers	WHA	11	0	10	1	664	61	0	5.51	.848	—	—	—	—	—	—	—	—
1978–79	Winnipeg Jets	WHA	11	7	3	0	626	31	0	2.97	.889	10	8	2	563	35	0	3.73	—
1979–80	Winnipeg Jets	NHL	20	4	11	4	1073	73	0	4.08	.873	—	—	—	—	—	—	—	—
1979–80	Tulsa Oilers	CHL	22	7	11	4	1324	73	0	3.31	—	1	0	1	60	6	0	6.00	—
WHA totals			22	7	13	4	1290	92	0	4.28	.865	10	8	2	563	35	0	3.73	.873
NHL totals			532	173	261	74	29619	1675	26	3.39	.894	20	5	13	1153	62	1	3.23	.902

"Smith's stats". The Goaltender Home Page.

== Citations ==
Preceded by Eddie Giacomin and Gilles Villemure	Winner of the Vezina Trophy with Tony Esposito; 1972	Succeeded by Ken Dryden
