= Ken Broderick =

Canadian ice hockey player (1942–2016)

- Born: February 16, 1942 Toronto, Ontario, Canada
- Died: March 13, 2016 (aged 74) Niagara Falls, Ontario, Canada
- Height: 5 ft 10 in (178 cm)
- Weight: 180 lb (82 kg; 12 st 12 lb)
- Position: Goaltender
- Caught: Right
- Played for: Minnesota North Stars; Boston Bruins; Edmonton Oilers; Quebec Nordiques
- Playing career: 1958–1978
Medal record
Ice hockey
Representing Canada
Olympic Games
Bronze medal – third place	1968 Grenoble

Kenneth Lorne Broderick (February 16, 1942 – March 13, 2016) was a Canadian professional ice hockey goaltender who played 27 games in the National Hockey League (NHL) for the Minnesota North Stars and Boston Bruins, and 73 games in the World Hockey Association (WHA) for the Edmonton Oilers and Quebec Nordiques. Broderick died after a short illness in 2016. He was the brother of the former professional hockey player Len Broderick.

== Career statistics ==
=== Regular season and playoffs ===
			Regular season									Playoffs
Season	Team	League	GP	W	L	T	MIN	GA	SO	GAA	SV%	GP	W	L	MIN	GA	SO	GAA	SV%
1958–59	Toronto Marlboros	OHA	1	0	1	0	40	5	0	7.50	—	—	—	—	—	—	—	—	—
1959–60	Toronto Marlboros	OHA	48	28	17	3	2880	180	4	3.75	—	4	0	4	240	17	0	4.25	—
1960–61	Toronto Marlboros	OHA	45	9	27	9	2700	187	0	4.15	.864	—	—	—	—	—	—	—	—
1960–61	St. Paul Saints	IHL	3	1	2	0	180	16	0	5.33	—	—	—	—	—	—	—	—	—
1961–62	Brampton 7-Ups	MTJHL	31	—	—	—	1860	155	1	5.00	—	5	1	4	300	37	0	7.40	—
1962–63	University of British Columbia	WCIAA	—	—	—	—	—	—	—	—	—	—	—	—	—	—	—	—	—
1963–64	Canadian National Team	Intl	—	—	—	—	—	—	—	—	—	—	—	—	—	—	—	—	—
1964–65	Canadian National Team	Intl	—	—	—	—	—	—	—	—	—	—	—	—	—	—	—	—	—
1965–66	Vancouver Canucks	WHL	3	1	1	1	190	8	0	2.53	.890	—	—	—	—	—	—	—	—
1966–67	Canadian National Team	Intl	—	—	—	—	—	—	—	—	—	—	—	—	—	—	—	—	—
1967–68	Winnipeg Nationals	WCSHL	9	—	—	—	540	23	1	2.77	—	—	—	—	—	—	—	—	—
1967–68	Hull Nationals	QSHL	1	1	0	0	60	3	0	3.00	—	—	—	—	—	—	—	—	—
1968–69	Phoenix Roadrunners	WHL	34	9	17	5	1904	115	2	3.62	.887	—	—	—	—	—	—	—	—
1969–70	Minnesota North Stars	NHL	7	2	4	0	360	26	0	4.33	.880	—	—	—	—	—	—	—	—
1969–70	Phoenix Roadrunners	WHL	8	3	2	1	440	23	1	3.14	.927	—	—	—	—	—	—	—	—
1969–70	Iowa Stars	CHL	16	—	—	—	930	44	2	2.84	—	—	—	—	—	—	—	—	—
1970–71	Oakville Oaks	OHA Sr	40	—	—	—	2400	202	0	5.05	—	—	—	—	—	—	—	—	—
1971–72	San Diego Gulls	WHL	42	18	15	7	2359	128	3	3.26	.893	2	0	2	119	6	0	3.03	—
1972–73	San Diego Gulls	WHL	51	24	20	6	2977	146	3	2.94	.906	3	0	3	145	17	0	7.02	—
1973–74	Boston Bruins	NHL	5	2	2	1	300	16	0	3.20	.874	—	—	—	—	—	—	—	—
1973–74	Boston Braves	AHL	6	1	4	0	318	18	0	3.39	—	—	—	—	—	—	—	—	—
1973–74	San Diego Gulls	WHL	4	1	3	0	220	19	0	5.18	.857	—	—	—	—	—	—	—	—
1974–75	Boston Bruins	NHL	15	7	6	0	802	32	1	2.39	.904	—	—	—	—	—	—	—	—
1974–75	Rochester Americans	AHL	3	1	2	0	180	15	0	5.00	.840	—	—	—	—	—	—	—	—
1974–75	Broome Dusters	NAHL	2	0	2	0	120	10	0	5.00	—	—	—	—	—	—	—	—	—
1975–76	Rochester Americans	AHL	42	22	13	7	2541	36	2	3.21	—	3	1	2	180	12	0	4.00	—
1976–77	Edmonton Oilers	WHA	40	18	18	1	2301	134	4	3.49	.878	3	1	2	179	10	0	3.35	—
1977–78	Edmonton Oilers	WHA	9	2	5	0	497	42	0	5.07	.796	—	—	—	—	—	—	—	—
1977–78	Quebec Nordiques	WHA	24	9	8	1	1140	83	0	4.37	.859	2	0	1	48	2	0	2.50	—
WHA totals			73	29	31	2	3938	259	4	3.94	.863	5	1	3	227	12	0	3.17	—
NHL totals			27	11	12	1	1463	74	1	3.04	.891	—	—	—	—	—	—	—	—

=== International ===
Year	Team	Event	GP	W	L	T	MIN	GA	SO	GAA	SV%
1964	Canada	OLY	6	1	1	0	173	12	0	4.16	—
1965	Canada	WC	5	4	1	0	300	11	2	2.20	—
1966	Canada	WC	3	3	0	0	180	2	2	0.67	—
1968	Canada	OLY	5	3	2	0	280	12	1	2.57	—
Senior totals			19	11	4	0	933	37	5	2.38	—
