= Toronto Neil McNeil Maroons =

Canadian junior ice hockey team

- City: Scarborough, Ontario, Canada
- League: Metro Junior A League
- Operated: 1962–63
- Home arena: Maple Leaf Gardens

The Toronto Neil McNeil Maroons were a junior ice hockey team in the Metro Junior A League as part of the Ontario Hockey Association (OHA) Major Junior Series. The Maroons were operated by Neil McNeil High School in Scarborough, Ontario. The team finished its only season in first place, were coached by Jim Gregory and included prospect players for the Toronto Maple Leafs.

== History ==
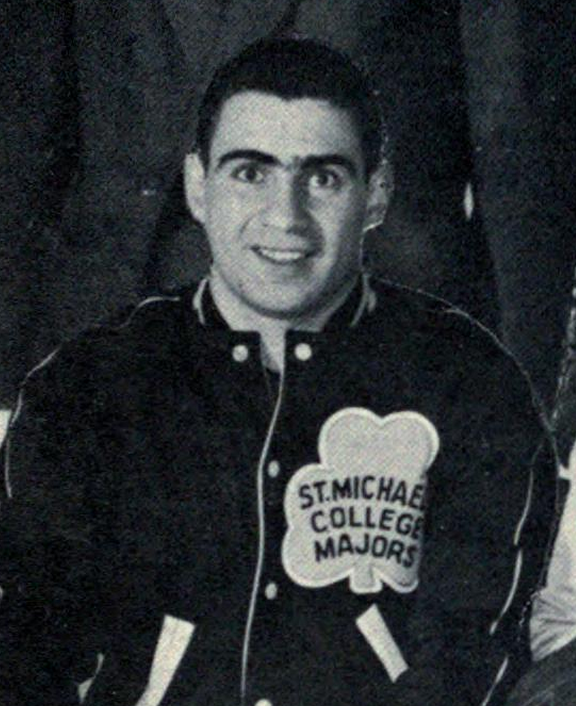
Jim Gregory in 1961

The Toronto Neil McNeil Maroons were formed from the remnants of the Toronto St. Michael's Majors in 1962. The Majors were operated by St. Michael's College School, which withdrew the Majors from the top tier of junior ice hockey in Ontario Hockey Association in June 1961 due to the length of the season impacting academic performance of its student athletes. After the Majors played the 1961–62 OHA season in the Metro Junior A League, the school decided to end the Majors program. The Toronto Maple Leafs' prospect players on the Majors were transferred to Neil McNeil High School, with Jim Gregory remaining as their coach and the director of the Maple Leafs' farm team system.

The Maroons finished in first place in the Metro Junior A league during the 1962–63 OHA season, and reached the finals for the J. Ross Robertson Cup but lost to the Niagara Falls Flyers. The Maroons were amalgamated into the Toronto Marlboros in 1963, another farm team of the Maple Leafs.

== NHL alumni ==
List of team alumni who played in the National Hockey League (NHL):

- Andre Champagne
- Mike Corbett
- Mike Corrigan
- Gary Dineen
- Billy MacMillan
- Jim McKenny
- Gerry Meehan
- Rod Seiling
- Gary Smith
- Mike Walton

== Season results ==
Statistical results from the 1962–63 OHA season:

Season	Games	Won	Lost	Tied	Points	Pct %	Goals For	Goals Against	Standing
1962–63	40	33	4	3	69	0.863	260	110	1st Metro Jr. A

== Bibliography ==
- Oliver, Greg (2017). Father Bauer and the Great Experiment: The Genesis of Canadian Olympic Hockey. Toronto, Ontario: ECW Press. ISBN 978-1-77041-249-1.
