= Brit Selby =

Canadian ice hockey player

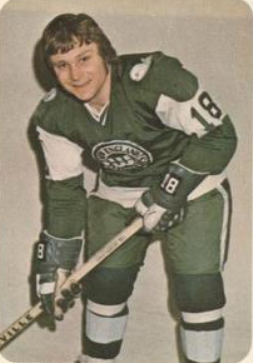
- Born: March 27, 1945 (age 81) Kingston, Ontario, Canada
- Height: 5 ft 10 in (178 cm)
- Weight: 175 lb (79 kg; 12 st 7 lb)
- Position: Left wing
- Shot: Left
- Played for: Toronto Maple Leafs; Philadelphia Flyers; St. Louis Blues; Quebec Nordiques; New England Whalers; Toronto Toros
- Playing career: 1965–1975

Robert Briton Selby (born March 27, 1945) is a Canadian former professional ice hockey left winger who played in the National Hockey League (NHL) for the Toronto Maple Leafs, Philadelphia Flyers and St. Louis Blues from 1965 to 1971. He also played in the World Hockey Association (WHA) for the Quebec Nordiques, New England Whalers and Toronto Toros from 1972 to 1975.

== Playing career ==
Selby started his hockey career with the Toronto Marlboros in the OHA where he played five seasons. Selby got his first taste of a championship win in 1963–64, when the Marlboros swept the Edmonton Oil Kings in 4 games to win their fourth Memorial Cup. In 1964–65, Selby was called up by the Toronto Maple Leafs to replace injured forward Ron Ellis in the NHL. He played 3 games with the Leafs, scoring 2 goals. Selby scored his first NHL goal against the New York Rangers' Jacques Plante in his first NHL game. Ellis would return and the Leafs sent Selby back down to the juniors.

The following season, Selby had a full-time roster spot with the Leafs. Selby scored a total of 27 points in his rookie season and was awarded the Calder Memorial Trophy, for best rookie of the season. His total of 27 points is the lowest scoring total by a Calder-winning forward since 1937–38. Struggling early on the next season, the Leafs sent Selby down to the minors to play with the Vancouver Canucks in the WHL. He played 15 games before injuring his leg, sidelining him out for the remainder of the year. In 1967, the NHL expanded by introducing 6 new teams. Selby was claimed by the Philadelphia Flyers in the Expansion Draft. During his first year with the Flyers, Selby set career highs in goals, assists, and points. The Flyers traded Selby back to his old team, the Maple Leafs, in 1968–69. Selby spent one season with the Leafs, before being traded again, this time to the St. Louis Blues. His stay with the Blues would be short however, as he was sent down to the minors with the Kansas City Blues.

In 1972–73, a newly formed league, the World Hockey Association was created. Selby was selected in the WHA General Player Draft by the Houston Aeros. Seeing an opportunity to jump out of the minors, Selby took it and signed on with the Aeros. Before even playing a game with the Aeros, he was immediately traded to the Quebec Nordiques. After playing only 7 games with the Nordiques, he was quickly traded to the Philadelphia Blazers, who in turn traded him to the New England Whalers. He spent 63 games with the Whalers, winning the Avco World Trophy, the WHA championship. In 1973–74, he was traded to the Toronto Toros, where he would retire.

== Post-playing career ==
After his playing career, Selby became a history teacher at North Toronto Collegiate Institute, from which he retired in 2010.

== Awards and achievements ==
- Memorial Cup champion in 1964
- Calder Memorial Trophy winner in 1966
- Avco World Trophy champion in 1973

== Career statistics ==
=== Regular season and playoffs ===
			Regular season					Playoffs
Season	Team	League	GP	G	A	Pts	PIM	GP	G	A	Pts	PIM
1960–61	Toronto Marlboros	OHA	2	0	0	0	0	—	—	—	—	—
1961–62	Toronto Marlboros	OHA	3	1	1	2	0	—	—	—	—	—
1962–63	Toronto Marlboros	OHA	33	24	15	39	22	11	6	11	17	28
1963–64	Toronto Marlboros	OHA	48	24	28	52	34	9	2	3	5	4
1963–64	Toronto Marlboros	M-Cup	—	—	—	—	—	12	8	11	19	10
1964–65	Toronto Marlboros	OHA	52	45	43	88	58	19	11	10	21	18
1964–65	Toronto Maple Leafs	NHL	3	2	0	2	2	—	—	—	—	—
1965–66	Toronto Maple Leafs	NHL	61	14	13	27	26	4	0	0	0	0
1966–67	Toronto Maple Leafs	NHL	6	1	1	2	0	—	—	—	—	—
1966–67	Vancouver Canucks	WHL	15	5	1	6	12	—	—	—	—	—
1967–68	Philadelphia Flyers	NHL	56	15	15	30	24	7	1	1	2	4
1968–69	Philadelphia Flyers	NHL	63	10	13	23	23	—	—	—	—	—
1968–69	Toronto Maple Leafs	NHL	14	2	2	4	19	4	0	0	0	4
1969–70	Toronto Maple Leafs	NHL	74	10	13	23	40	—	—	—	—	—
1970–71	Toronto Maple Leafs	NHL	11	0	1	1	6	—	—	—	—	—
1970–71	St. Louis Blues	NHL	56	1	5	23	1	0	0	0	0
1971–72	St. Louis Blues	NHL	6	0	0	0	0	—	—	—	—	—
1971–72	Kansas City Blues	CHL	63	11	24	35	82	—	—	—	—	—
1972–73	Quebec Nordiques	WHA	7	0	1	1	4	—	—	—	—	—
1972–73	New England Whalers	WHA	65	13	29	42	48	13	3	4	7	13
1973–74	Toronto Toros	WHA	64	9	17	26	21	10	1	3	4	2
1974–75	Toronto Toros	WHA	17	1	4	5	0	—	—	—	—	—
WHA totals			153	23	51	74	73	23	4	7	11	15
NHL totals			350	55	62	117	163	16	1	1	2	8

Preceded by Roger Crozier	Winner of the Calder Memorial Trophy; 1966	Succeeded by Bobby Orr
