= Andy Brown (ice hockey) =

Canadian retired ice hockey goaltender

- Born: February 15, 1944 (age 81) Hamilton, Ontario, Canada
- Height: 6 ft 0 in (183 cm)
- Weight: 185 lb (84 kg; 13 st 3 lb)
- Position: Goaltender
- Caught: Left
- Played for: Detroit Red Wings; Pittsburgh Penguins; Indianapolis Racers
- Playing career: 1964–1977

Andrew Conrad Brown (born February 15, 1944) is a Canadian former professional ice hockey goaltender.

== Career ==
Brown played with the Detroit Red Wings and the Pittsburgh Penguins of the National Hockey League, the Indianapolis Racers of the World Hockey Association and several teams in the minor leagues.

In the 1973–74 season, he incurred 60 minutes in penalties, an NHL record at the time for penalty minutes in a season by a goaltender. He was the last goalie to play without a mask in the NHL, on April 7, 1974, in a 6–3 loss to the Atlanta Flames; he continued to play without a mask throughout his three seasons in the WHA. His insistence on playing barefaced earned him the nickname "Fearless".

== Personal life ==
His father, Adam, also played in the National Hockey League, as a left winger. In the offseason, Andy raced supermodified race cars at the Oswego Speedway and other tracks in the Northeast.

== Career statistics ==
=== Regular season and playoffs ===
			Regular season									Playoffs
Season	Team	League	GP	W	L	T	MIN	GA	SO	GAA	SV%	GP	W	L	MIN	GA	SO	GAA	SV%
1962–63	Guelph Royals	OHA	20	—	—	—	1200	100	1	5.00	—	—	—	—	—	—	—	—	—
1962–63	Brampton 7-Up	MTJHL	20	—	—	—	1175	109	0	5.54	—	—	—	—	—	—	—	—	—
1964–65	Gander Flyers	NFLD-Sr	18	5	13	0	1079	105	1	5.84	—	—	—	—	—	—	—	—	—
1965–66	Johnstown Jets	EHL	70	39	29	2	4200	253	0	3.61	—	3	0	3	180	14	0	4.67	—
1965–66	Baltimore Clippers	AHL	1	0	0	0	14	3	0	12.86	—	—	—	—	—	—	—	—	—
1966–67	Long Island Ducks	EHL	45	23	19	3	2676	137	3	3.07	—	3	0	3	180	15	0	5.00	—
1966–67	Johnstown Jets	EHL	1	0	1	0	60	6	0	6.00	—	—	—	—	—	—	—	—	—
1967–68	Johnstown Jets	EHL	72	38	25	9	4320	273	4	3.79	—	2	0	2	—	13	0	8.33	—
1968–69	Baltimore Clippers	AHL	41	16	19	3	2211	134	2	3.64	—	—	—	—	—	—	—	—	—
1969–70	Baltimore Clippers	AHL	40	—	—	—	2082	125	1	3.60	—	—	—	—	—	—	—	—	—
1970–71	Baltimore Clippers	AHL	50	28	13	8	2954	141	4	2.86	.912	6	2	4	360	18	1	3.00	—
1971–72	Detroit Red Wings	NHL	10	4	5	1	560	37	0	3.96	.884	—	—	—	—	—	—	—	—
1971–72	Tidewater Wings	AHL	23	4	16	1	1278	86	0	4.04	—	—	—	—	—	—	—	—	—
1971–72	Fort Worth Wings	CHL	16	9	4	3	960	52	0	3.25	—	—	—	—	—	—	—	—	—
1972–73	Fort Worth Wings	CHL	22	—	—	—	1300	86	2	3.97	—	—	—	—	—	—	—	—	—
1972–73	Detroit Red Wings	NHL	7	2	1	2	337	20	0	3.56	.877	—	—	—	—	—	—	—	—
1972–73	Pittsburgh Penguins	NHL	9	3	4	2	520	41	0	4.73	.868	—	—	—	—	—	—	—	—
1973–74	Pittsburgh Penguins	NHL	36	13	16	4	1956	115	1	3.53	.881	—	—	—	—	—	—	—	—
1974–75	Indianapolis Racers	WHA	52	15	35	0	2979	206	2	4.15	.873	—	—	—	—	—	—	—	—
1975–76	Indianapolis Racers	WHA	24	9	11	2	1368	82	1	3.60	.891	—	—	—	—	—	—	—	—
1976–77	Indianapolis Racers	WHA	10	1	4	1	430	26	0	3.63	.867	—	—	—	—	—	—	—	—
NHL totals			62	22	26	9	3373	213	1	3.79	.879	—	—	—	—	—	—	—	—
WHA totals			86	25	50	3	4777	314	3	3.94	.878	—	—	—	—	—	—	—	—

== Transactions ==
- On June 7, 1971, the Detroit Red Wings claimed Brown in the inter-league draft (from Baltimore (AHL)).
- On February 25, 1973, the Detroit Red Wings traded Brown to the Pittsburgh Penguins in exchange for 1973 third-round pick (#39 - Nelson Pyatt).
