= Jim McKenny =

Canadian ice hockey player and broadcaster

- Born: December 1, 1946 (age 79); Ottawa, Ontario, Canada
- Occupations: Professional hockey player; TV sports reporter; addiction counsellor
Ice hockey career
- Height: 5 ft 11 in (180 cm)
- Weight: 180 lb (82 kg; 12 st 12 lb)
- Position: Defence
- Shot: Right
- Played for: Toronto Maple Leafs; Minnesota North Stars
- NHL draft: 17th overall, 1963; Toronto Maple Leafs
- Playing career: 1965–1979

James Claude "Howie" McKenny (born December 1, 1946) is a Canadian former professional ice hockey player and broadcaster.

As a defenceman, McKenny played in the National Hockey League from 1966 to 1978, mostly for the Toronto Maple Leafs, in addition to a short tenure with the Minnesota North Stars. His nickname "Howie" is due to a resemblance to Howie Young. Known for witty one-liners, McKenny once said of professional ice hockey that "half the game is mental, the other half is being mental".

After retiring from playing hockey, McKenny settled in Toronto where he began a career in broadcasting, most notably working as a local television sports reporter on Citytv from 1984 until 2010.

== Junior hockey career ==
Born in Ottawa, Ontario, McKenny played with the Neil McNeil Maroons of the Metro Junior A league in 1962–63. When the league folded in 1963, McKenny transferred to the Ontario Hockey Association's Toronto Marlboros who won the Memorial Cup in 1964.

As a junior, McKenny was considered by many scouts as the second-best defenceman prospect after Bobby Orr.

In later years, McKenny spoke openly of his personal life and career being negatively affected by periods of alcoholism developed during his teenage years.

== Pro hockey career ==
Drafted by the Toronto Maple Leafs in the third round of the 1963 NHL amateur draft (17th overall), McKenny had difficulty staying in the NHL early in his career and often played forward instead of his usual position on defence. He was called up from the Marlboros to play two games with the Leafs in the 1965–66 season. He was given two other opportunities with the Leafs in 1966–67 and 1967–68 but only played a total of eleven games. However, on February 24, 1968, he scored the game-winning goal in a 1-0 win over Boston, which was the second goal of his NHL career. He struggled to stick with the Maple Leafs for several years, attributed to a poor attitude, possibly his alcoholism and his antipathy towards the high-pressure style of coach and general manager Punch Imlach. He played in the minor leagues for the Tulsa Oilers, Rochester Americans, and Vancouver Canucks of the Western Hockey League. Throughout the mid-1960s with the Rochester Americans, young McKenny and veteran Don Cherry were roommates when on the road.

McKenny finally became a full-time member of the Maple Leafs during the 1969–70 season and became one of the Leafs top defencemen for eight seasons. McKenny has the sixth-highest points total for Leafs defencemen, accumulating 327 points (81 goals, 246 assists) in 594 games, behind only Börje Salming, Tomáš Kaberle, Morgan Rielly, Tim Horton, and Ian Turnbull. McKenny was paired frequently with former Marlboro team-mate Brian Glennie, with offensive skills complementing the hard-hitting, defence-oriented style of Glennie. In 1974, McKenny played in the NHL All-Star Game. In 1971, he also appeared in the movie Face-Off as the skating stand-in for Art Hindle.

Near the end of his career, McKenny was sent down to the Dallas Black Hawks Central Hockey League (CHL) for the 1977–78 season, and was subsequently named to the CHL's Second All-Star Team. On May 15, 1978, McKenny was traded to the Minnesota North Stars for cash and future considerations (the rights to Owen Lloyd), playing in only ten games before retiring from the NHL.

McKenny played the 1979-80 season in Europe—in Lyon, France and Rapperswil, Switzerland with SC Rapperswil–Jona—before retiring completely from hockey.

== Post-hockey ==
After hockey, McKenny returned to Toronto and began attempting to break into the broadcasting industry, selling advertising and volunteering on the weekends at radio stations CHUM-AM and CHUM-FM. He soon landed a gig as a colour commentator for Canadian-Italian Hockey League (CIHL) games at St. Mike's Arena, working Friday nights alongside play-by-play announcer Brad Diamond on local station CFMT-TV branded as "Multilingual Television".

He was then hired by Gary Slaight at the Slaight Communications-owned Q107 radio station to sell advertising and contribute on the microphone on a show with Scruff Connors and Gene Valaitis.

Throughout this time, McKenny supplemented his income with modelling gigs.

=== Citytv ===
In 1984, after longtime Citytv sports anchor Jim Tatti left to launch Sportsline on the Canada-wide Global Television Network, 37-year-old McKenny was hired at Citytv. In addition to filing sports reports, McKenny began appearing as in-studio sports anchorman on the daily CityPulse 6p.m. and 11p.m. newscasts. During their on-camera banter before and after the sports segments, lead anchorman Gord Martineau usually addressed McKenny by his nickname "Howie".

Over time, in addition to professional sports, McKenny devoted a significant portion of his CityPulse segments to covering local Toronto-area high school sports. During the high school sports season, this included the 'Athlete of the Week' feature celebrating a different high school athlete's exceptional performance; the segment eventually became somewhat of a signature for the reporter.

While on vacation in Montego Bay, Jamaica during November 2002, 55-year-old McKenny suffered a heart attack following a workout. After being taken to Half Moon Clinic in Jamaica, he was transported by air ambulance to South Miami Hospital where he underwent angioplasty. He has since been able to make a full recovery. In later interviews, McKenny talked about having to borrow US$70,000 from friends in order to immediately cover the U.S. airlift and hospital costs due to not having his Canadian medical insurance information on him.

The December 27, 2009 broadcast of CityPulse Tonight (11p.m. air time) was McKenny's last with Citytv as the station refocused its sports coverage solely around the younger anchor Kathryn Humphreys. McKenny agreed to a deal to continue anchoring the sports package on the weekend newscasts for another year due to Humphreys' unwillingness to work the weekends.

McKenny, at the age of 64, did not pursue further jobs in broadcasting after leaving Citytv, and instead counselled alcohol addicts.

In 2013, McKenney was inducted into the Ottawa Sports Hall of Fame.

== Personal ==
=== Family ===
McKenny and his wife Christine have two children, a son and a daughter. His daughter died in a car accident in 2013.

=== Alcoholism ===
McKenny struggled with alcoholism for much of his career in hockey and television, starting during his late teens and continuing well into his forties. He has been sober for over two decades. He now helps other addicts by working as a counsellor at the Canadian Centre for Addictions, based in Port Hope, Ontario.

== Career statistics ==
=== Regular season and playoffs ===
			Regular season					Playoffs
Season	Team	League	GP	G	A	Pts	PIM	GP	G	A	Pts	PIM
1962–63	Toronto Neil McNeil Maroons	MetJHL	37	5	12	17	43	10	3	3	6	10
1962–63	Toronto Neil McNeil Maroons	MC	—	—	—	—	—	6	1	1	2	8
1963–64	Toronto Marlboros	OHA	56	7	31	38	102	9	2	0	2	22
1963–64	Toronto Marlboros	MC	—	—	—	—	—	12	1	7	8	22
1964–65	Toronto Marlboros	OHA	52	7	41	48	117	19	4	15	19	43
1965–66	Toronto Marlboros	OHA	42	14	26	40	78	14	3	10	13	38
1965–66	Rochester Americans	AHL	1	0	1	1	0	—	—	—	—	—
1965–66	Toronto Maple Leafs	NHL	2	0	0	0	2	—	—	—	—	—
1965–66	Tulsa Oilers	CPHL	—	—	—	—	—	4	2	2	4	2
1966–67	Toronto Maple Leafs	NHL	6	1	0	1	0	—	—	—	—	—
1966–67	Tulsa Oilers	CPHL	45	9	19	28	29	—	—	—	—	—
1966–67	Rochester Americans	AHL	19	3	6	9	10	7	0	0	0	2
1967–68	Toronto Maple Leafs	NHL	5	1	0	1	0	—	—	—	—	—
1967–68	Rochester Americans	AHL	46	10	22	32	33	11	2	2	4	4
1968–69	Toronto Maple Leafs	NHL	7	0	0	0	2	—	—	—	—	—
1968–69	Rochester Americans	AHL	47	19	31	50	22	—	—	—	—	—
1968–69	Vancouver Canucks	WHL	18	7	14	21	4	8	5	5	10	6
1969–70	Toronto Maple Leafs	NHL	73	11	33	44	34	—	—	—	—	—
1970–71	Toronto Maple Leafs	NHL	68	4	26	30	42	6	2	1	3	2
1971–72	Toronto Maple Leafs	NHL	76	5	31	36	27	5	3	0	3	2
1972–73	Toronto Maple Leafs	NHL	77	11	41	52	55	—	—	—	—	—
1973–74	Toronto Maple Leafs	NHL	77	14	28	42	36	4	0	2	2	0
1974–75	Toronto Maple Leafs	NHL	66	8	35	43	31	7	0	1	1	2
1975–76	Toronto Maple Leafs	NHL	46	10	19	29	19	6	2	3	5	2
1976–77	Toronto Maple Leafs	NHL	76	14	31	45	36	9	0	2	2	2
1977–78	Toronto Maple Leafs	NHL	15	2	2	4	8	—	—	—	—	—
1977–78	Dallas Black Hawks	CHL	55	21	31	52	45	13	1	6	7	8
1978–79	Minnesota North Stars	NHL	10	1	1	2	2	—	—	—	—	—
1978–79	Oklahoma City Stars	CHL	33	11	23	34	10	—	—	—	—	—
1979–80	SC Rapperswil-Jona	SUI.2	—	—	—	—	—	—	—	—	—	—
AHL totals			113	32	60	92	65	18	2	2	4	6
NHL totals			604	82	247	329	294	37	7	9	16	10
