= Mike Corbett (ice hockey, born 1942) =

Canadian ice hockey player

- Born: October 4, 1942 Toronto, Ontario, Canada
- Died: January 9, 2003 (aged 60) Burlington, Ontario, Canada
- Height: 6 ft 2 in (188 cm)
- Weight: 190 lb (86 kg; 13 st 8 lb)
- Position: Right wing
- Shot: Right
- Played for: Los Angeles Kings
- Playing career: 1962–1974

Michael Corbett (October 4, 1942 – January 9, 2003) was a Canadian professional ice hockey right winger who played two playoffs games in the National Hockey League for the Los Angeles Kings during the 1967–68 season. The rest of his career, which lasted from 1962 to 1974, was spent in the minor leagues.

== Early life ==
Corbett was born in Toronto. After playing junior hockey in the Ontario Hockey Association for the Toronto St. Michael's Majors from 1959 to 1962 and the Toronto Neil McNeil Maroons from 1962 to 1963.

== Career ==
Corbett made his professional debut with the Sudbury Wolves of the Eastern Professional Hockey League in 1962. His participation in the league however was short-lived as the EPHL folded following the season's conclusion, forcing Corbett to look elsewhere to play. Eventually, he signed with the Rochester Americans of the American Hockey League whilst also splitting the 1963–1964 season with the Denver Invaders of the Western Hockey League.

In 1964, Corbett joined the Tulsa Oilers of the Central Professional Hockey League and spent the entire 1964–1965 season with the team. After that, he split the next season with three different teams, the AHL's Baltimore Clippers, the CPHL's Minnesota Rangers and the WHL's Victoria Maple Leafs during their playoff run. He then had short spells in the AHL with the Providence Reds and the Springfield Indians, playing five games with each team, before joining the Vancouver Canucks of the WHL.

Corbett would play in 70 regular season games for the Canucks, scoring 17 goals and 21 assists, for 38 points. Despite this, the Canucks finished last the standings and missed the playoffs. Following this, the Los Angeles Kings of the National Hockey League offered him a spot in their playoff roster and Corbett played in two games for the Kings during their 1968 Stanley Cup playoff quarter-final against the Minnesota North Stars, which they lost four games to three. Corbett notched up one assist and two penalty minutes in the two games he played.

After his brief NHL run came to an end, Corbett played one more season in the professional minor leagues, splitting the year in the International Hockey League with the Dayton Gems as well as back in the AHL with the Springfield Kings before finishing his career playing senior hockey level in the OHA Senior A League. He played for Galt Hornets, Oakville Oaks, Orillia Terriers and the Brantford Foresters from 1969 to 1974.

After retiring from playing hockey in 1974, Corbett became an usher at the Air Canada Centre in Toronto, Ontario.

== Personal life ==
Corbett died of cancer at the age of 60, on January 9, 2003, in Burlington, Ontario and was cremated.

== Career statistics ==
=== Regular season and playoffs ===
			Regular season					Playoffs
Season	Team	League	GP	G	A	Pts	PIM	GP	G	A	Pts	PIM
1959–60	St. Michael's Buzzers	MetJBHL	—	—	—	—	—	—	—	—	—	—
1959–60	St. Michael's Majors	OHA	2	0	0	0	0	—	—	—	—	—
19560–61	St. Michael's Buzzers	MetJBHL	28	29	24	53	—	—	—	—	—	—
1960–61	St. Michael's Majors	OHA	2	0	1	1	0	1	0	0	0	0
1961–62	St. Michael's Majors	OHA	31	19	33	52	44	11	7	6	13	37
1961–62	St. Michael's Majors	M-Cup	—	—	—	—	—	5	0	1	1	2
1962–63	Toronto Neil McNeil Maroons	MTJAHL	37	44	50	94	76	10	7	12	19	13
1962–63	Sudbury Wolves	EPHL	5	1	4	5	0	—	—	—	—	—
1962–63	Toronto Neil McNeil Maroons	M-Cup	—	—	—	—	—	6	3	2	5	27
1963–64	Rochester Americans	AHL	50	5	10	15	18	—	—	—	—	—
1963–64	Denver Invaders	WHL	6	1	0	1	29	5	0	3	3	8
1964–65	Tulsa Oilers	CPHL	55	4	18	22	63	9	0	1	1	10
1965–66	Minnesota Rangers	CPHL	4	0	2	2	2	—	—	—	—	—
1965–66	Baltimore Clippers	AHL	35	4	5	9	50	—	—	—	—	—
1966–67	Providence Reds	AHL	5	0	1	1	14	—	—	—	—	—
1966–67	Springfield Indians	AHL	5	0	0	0	12	—	—	—	—	—
1967–68	Vancouver Canucks	WHL	70	17	21	38	83	—	—	—	—	—
1967–68	Los Angeles Kings	NHL	—	—	—	—	—	2	0	1	1	2
1968–69	Springfield Kings	AHL	25	3	4	7	54	—	—	—	—	—
1968–69	Dayton Gems	IHL	34	3	13	16	61	9	2	6	8	4
1969–70	Galt Hornets	OHA Sr	28	3	17	20	69	—	—	—	—	—
1970–71	Orillia Terriers	OHA Sr	16	3	14	17	32	—	—	—	—	—
1971–72	Orillia Terriers	OHA Sr	16	3	14	17	32	—	—	—	—	—
1971–72	Oakville Oaks	OHA Sr	18	5	12	17	68	—	—	—	—	—
1972–73	Brantford Foresters	OHA Sr	28	6	14	20	30	—	—	—	—	—
1973–74	Brantford Foresters	OHA Sr	34	6	22	28	39	—	—	—	—	—
AHL totals			120	12	20	32	148	—	—	—	—	—
NHL totals			—	—	—	—	—	2	0	1	1	2
