= Gary Dineen =

Canadian ice hockey player and coach

- Born: December 24, 1943 Montreal, Quebec, Canada
- Died: April 1, 2006 (aged 62) Springfield, Massachusetts, United States
- Height: 5 ft 10 in (178 cm)
- Weight: 175 lb (79 kg; 12 st 7 lb)
- Position: Centre
- Shot: Left
- Played for: Minnesota North Stars
- Playing career: 1963–1971

Daniel Gary Patrick Dineen (December 24, 1943 – April 1, 2006) was a Canadian professional ice hockey player and coach. Dineen played five seasons with the Canadian national amateur team, including at the 1964 and 1968 Winter Olympics where he won a bronze medal at the latter, before joining the professional leagues in 1968. He played the bulk of his professional career in the minor leagues, and four games for the Minnesota North Stars of the National Hockey League (NHL) during the 1968–69 season. He later became a coach in the American Hockey League and junior ice hockey.

== Hockey career ==
Olympic medal record

Men's Ice hockey
Bronze medal – third place	1968 Grenoble	Ice hockey

Dineen, a native of Montreal, played high school hockey at Loyola High school. He played junior ice hockey in the Toronto area from 1960 to 1964. He was a member of the 1961 Memorial Cup-winning Toronto St. Michael's Majors team and the 1964 Memorial Cup-winning Toronto Marlboros team. That year, he joined the new Canadian national ice hockey team. In all, he played in five seasons with the national team, along with one season with the University of British Columbia. Dineen played for Canada in the 1964 and 1968 Olympic Games, and the 1965–1967 World Championships. The team won the bronze medal in the 1966 and 1967 World Championships and a bronze in the 1968 Olympics.

Dineen became a professional in 1968, signing with the Minnesota North Stars organization. In the 1968–69 season, Dineen made his only appearance in the NHL, with four games. He played the bulk of the season with their Memphis farm team. He played two more seasons of professional hockey before retiring after the Springfield Kings won the Calder Cup championship of the American Hockey League in 1970-71. The following season he would move into coaching with the Kings, and would go on to coach and GM the Kings and Springfield Indians for several years.

In 1972 he helped form the Springfield Olympics of the New England Junior Hockey League, where he coached the 'Pics to several Wallace Cups as league champions, and remained part of the franchise until his death. He helped develop several players who would go on to division 1 and 2 college hockey programs. He also had a few of his former players go on to successful careers in the NHL, including Bill Guerin. Dean Lombardi, current President and General Manager of the Los Angeles Kings of the National Hockey League, also played for Dineen in the mid-late 1970s.

Dineen made West Springfield, Massachusetts his home with his wife and daughter for well over 30 years. His keen hockey intellect and coaching abilities made him a magnet for upper echelon junior players from New England, primarily Western Massachusetts/Northern Connecticut, who aspired to play college and professional hockey.

He was inducted to the Massachusetts Hockey Hall of Fame, in addition to being honored with the USA Hockey Presidents Award and the American Hockey Coaches Association's "Snooks Kelley Award".

== Career statistics ==
=== Regular season and playoffs ===
			Regular season					Playoffs
Season	Team	League	GP	G	A	Pts	PIM	GP	G	A	Pts	PIM
1960–61	St. Michael's Buzzers	MetJBHL	28	32	33	65	—	—	—	—	—	—
1960–61	Toronto St. Michael's Majors	OHA	12	0	0	0	0	6	0	0	0	0
1960–61	Toronto St. Michael's Majors	M-Cup	—	—	—	—	—	1	0	0	0	0
1961–62	Toronto St. Michael's Majors	OHA	33	26	35	61	19	11	7	11	18	0
1961–62	Toronto St. Michael's Majors	M-Cup	—	—	—	—	—	5	2	4	6	2
1962–63	Toronto Neil McNeil Maroons	MTJAHL	38	32	63	95	33	10	12	18	30	0
1962–63	Toronto Neil McNeil Maroons	M-Cup	—	—	—	—	—	6	1	5	6	2
1963–64	Canadian National Team	Intl	—	—	—	—	—	—	—	—	—	—
1963–64	Toronto Marlboros	OHA	2	1	5	6	4	9	5	12	17	8
1963–64	Toronto Marlboros	M-Cup	—	—	—	—	—	10	10	10	20	0
1964–65	University of British Columbia	WCIAA	—	—	—	—	—	—	—	—	—	—
1965–66	Canadian National Team	Intl	—	—	—	—	—	—	—	—	—	—
1966–67	Canadian National Team	Intl	—	—	—	—	—	—	—	—	—	—
1967–68	Ottawa Nationals	OHA Sr	20	7	20	27	4	—	—	—	—	—
1968–69	Minnesota North Stars	NHL	4	0	1	1	0	—	—	—	—	—
1968–69	Memphis South Stars	CHL	63	11	38	49	0	—	—	—	—	—
1969–70	Iowa Stars	CHL	15	3	2	5	2	—	—	—	—	—
1969–70	Salt Lake Golden Eagles	WHL	10	1	2	3	0	—	—	—	—	—
1969–70	Springfield Kings	AHL	8	1	2	3	0	—	—	—	—	—
1970–71	Springfield Kings	AHL	56	12	22	34	28	12	4	7	11	6
NHL totals			4	0	1	1	0	—	—	—	—	—

=== International ===
Year	Team	Event	GP	G	A	Pts	PIM
1964	Canada	OLY	7	3	6	9	10
1965	Canada	WC	7	6	5	11	4
1967	Canada	WC	7	1	4	5	6
1968	Canada	OLY	7	1	2	3	6
Senior totals			28	11	17	28	26
