= Ron Ellis =

Canadian ice hockey player (1945–2024)

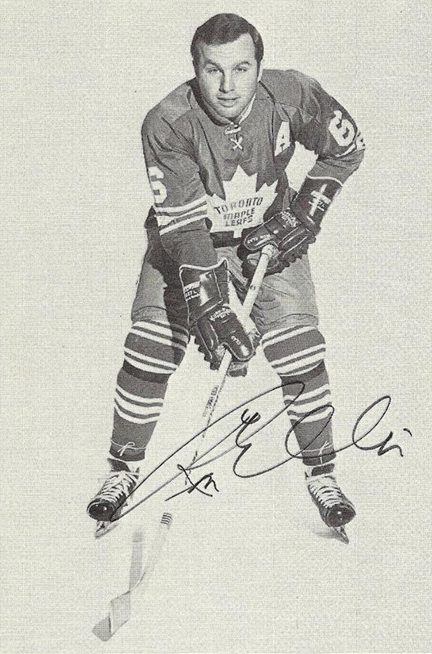
- Born: January 8, 1945 Lindsay, Ontario, Canada
- Died: May 11, 2024 (aged 79) Belleville, Ontario, Canada
- Height: 5 ft 9 in (175 cm)
- Weight: 195 lb (88 kg; 13 st 13 lb)
- Position: Right wing
- Shot: Right
- Played for: Toronto Maple Leafs
- National team: Canada
- Playing career: 1963–1981

Ronald John Edward Ellis (January 8, 1945 – May 11, 2024) was a Canadian professional ice hockey player. Ellis played 16 seasons in the National Hockey League for the Toronto Maple Leafs. Ellis won the Stanley Cup in 1967, and took part in the famed 1972 Summit Series against the Russian National team. After retiring, Ellis went into business and later joined the staff of the Hockey Hall of Fame.

== Playing career ==
Ellis was signed by the Leafs and played junior hockey with the Toronto Marlboros of the Ontario Hockey Association from 1961–1964. He played on the team that won the Memorial Cup in 1964. Ellis became a full-time Leaf in 1964–65 and played 11 seasons to 1974–75, winning the Stanley Cup in 1967.

Ellis was also a member of Team Canada at the 1972 Summit Series, one of only seven Canadians to play every game in the series, and part of the only line to play together for every game, with centre Bobby Clarke and left winger Paul Henderson.

Ellis retired at age 30 during Leafs training camp in 1975, coming off the most productive season of his career with 61 points. He said he no longer had the desire to play and denied that his decision had anything to do with being passed over as team captain in favour of Darryl Sittler a month earlier.

In 1977, Ellis came out of retirement to play for Canada at the world hockey championships and then decided to resume his NHL career with the Leafs in 1977–78.

Punch Imlach was hired as general manager of the Leafs for the 1979–80 season and didn't feel that Ellis was worth the money he was being paid. He offered to buy out Ellis's contract at the end of the season, but the two couldn't reach an agreement. Despite objections from new coach Mike Nykoluk, Imlach put Ellis on waivers during the 1980–81 season and gave him an ultimatum: retire or be sent to the minor leagues. The 36-year-old Ellis chose to retire. He had played 1,034 career NHL games scoring 332 goals and 308 assists for 640 points, making him one of five Maple Leafs to appear in more than 1,000 games for the club, and placing him fifth on the team's list of goal-scorers.

== Post-playing career ==
After his life in hockey, worked as a teacher and in insurance. For six years, Ellis ran his own sporting goods store. In 1993, he joined the Hockey Hall of Fame as a director of public affairs and assistant to the president. As of 2014, Ellis was still director of public affairs for the Hockey Hall of Fame.

The stresses of life after hockey took their toll. In 1986 a bout with clinical depression began. He would later go public with his story by writing a book with Kevin Shea titled Over The Boards: The Ron Ellis Story, published in 2002. He was a speaker on the importance of diagnosing and treating clinical depression.

On October 17, 2016, Ellis was part of a healthy class inducted into the Ontario Sports Hall of Fame at the Sheraton Centre Toronto Hotel, where he thanked Jim Gregory as his mentor and coach.

== Death ==
Ellis died on May 11, 2024, at the age of 79.

== Awards and achievements ==
Ellis earned an unusual tribute in 1968 when former Leafs star Ace Bailey—then working as a timekeeper at Maple Leaf Gardens—declared that he admired Ellis so much, he wanted the team to give his retired #6 to Ellis. Bailey's number had been retired following his career-ending injury in 1933. Ellis, who had been wearing #8, changed to #6 for the rest of his career, after which the number was re-retired.

- 1966–67 – Stanley Cup Champion
- 1964 – NHL All-Star Game
- 1965 – NHL All-Star Game
- 1968 – NHL All-Star Game
- 1970 – NHL All-Star Game
- 1972 Summit Series Champion

== Career statistics ==
=== Regular season and playoffs ===
			Regular season					Playoffs
Season	Team	League	GP	G	A	Pts	PIM	GP	G	A	Pts	PIM
1960–61	Weston Dukes	MetJHL	28	18	17	35	16	—	—	—	—	—
1960–61	Toronto Marlboros	OHA-Jr.	3	2	1	3	0	—	—	—	—	—
1961–62	Toronto Marlboros	OHA-Jr.	33	17	12	29	16	12	6	5	11	4
1962–63	Toronto Marlboros	OHA-Jr.	36	21	22	43	8	10	9	9	18	2
1963–64	Toronto Marlboros	OHA-Jr.	54	46	38	84	20	9	4	10	14	10
1963–64	Toronto Maple Leafs	NHL	1	0	0	0	0	—	—	—	—	—
1963–64	Toronto Marlboros	MC	—	—	—	—	—	8	5	9	14	6
1964–65	Toronto Maple Leafs	NHL	62	23	16	39	14	6	3	0	3	2
1965–66	Toronto Maple Leafs	NHL	70	19	23	42	24	4	0	0	0	2
1966–67	Toronto Maple Leafs	NHL	67	22	23	45	14	12	2	1	3	4
1967–68	Toronto Maple Leafs	NHL	74	28	20	48	8	—	—	—	—	—
1968–69	Toronto Maple Leafs	NHL	72	25	21	46	12	4	2	1	3	2
1969–70	Toronto Maple Leafs	NHL	76	35	19	54	14	—	—	—	—	—
1970–71	Toronto Maple Leafs	NHL	78	24	29	53	10	6	1	1	2	2
1971–72	Toronto Maple Leafs	NHL	78	23	24	47	17	5	1	1	2	4
1972–73	Toronto Maple Leafs	NHL	78	22	29	51	22	—	—	—	—	—
1973–74	Toronto Maple Leafs	NHL	70	23	25	48	12	4	2	1	3	0
1974–75	Toronto Maple Leafs	NHL	79	32	29	61	25	7	3	0	3	2
1977–78	Toronto Maple Leafs	NHL	80	26	24	50	17	13	3	2	5	0
1978–79	Toronto Maple Leafs	NHL	63	16	12	28	10	6	1	1	2	2
1979–80	Toronto Maple Leafs	NHL	59	12	11	23	6	3	0	0	0	0
1980–81	Toronto Maple Leafs	NHL	27	2	3	5	2	—	—	—	—	—
NHL totals			1,034	332	308	640	207	70	18	8	26	20

=== International ===
Year	Team	Event	GP	G	A	Pts	PIM
1972	Canada	SS	8	0	3	3	8
1977	Canada	WC	10	5	4	9	2
Senior totals			18	5	7	12	10

== International play ==
- 1972 – Member of Team Canada in the Summit Series
- 1977 – Member of Team Canada in the World Hockey Championships

== See also ==
- List of NHL players with 1,000 games played
- List of NHL players who spent their entire career with one franchise
