= 1961 Memorial Cup =

Canadian junior ice hockey championship

The Memorial Cup trophy

The 1961 Memorial Cup final was the 43rd junior ice hockey championship of the Canadian Amateur Hockey Association (CAHA). The George Richardson Memorial Trophy champions Toronto St. Michael's Majors of the Ontario Hockey Association in Eastern Canada competed against the Abbott Cup champions Edmonton Oil Kings of the Central Alberta Hockey League in Western Canada. In a best-of-seven series, held at the Edmonton Gardens in Edmonton, Alberta, St. Michael's won their 4th Memorial Cup, defeating Edmonton 4 games to 2.

CAHA vice-president Art Potter was in change of the playoffs in Western Canada and the final championship series. During the Western Canada final between the Winnipeg Rangers and the Edmonton Oil Kings, Potter assessed 10-minute misconduct penalties to five players and ordered them to begin the third game of the series in the penalty box. The Winnipeg Free Press described the decision as "an unusual scene" and that it had resulted from an on-ice stick-swinging brawl during game two of the series.

== Scores ==
- Game 1: St. Michael's 4-0 Edmonton
- Game 2: St. Michael's 4-1 Edmonton
- Game 3: St. Michael's 4-2 Edmonton
- Game 4: Edmonton 5-4 St. Michael's
- Game 5: Edmonton 4-2 St. Michael's
- Game 6: St. Michael's 4-2 Edmonton

== Winning roster ==
Arnie Brown, Andre Champagne, Gerry Cheevers, Jack Cole, Paul Conlin, Terry Clancy, Bruce Draper, Dave Draper, Dave Dryden, Roger Galipeau, Paul Jackson, Larry Keenan, Duncan MacDonald, Bill MacMillan, Barry MacKenzie, Peter Noakes, Terry O'Malley, Sonny Osborne, Brian Walsh. Coach: Father David Bauer.
