= Brampton Warriors =

- City: Brampton, Ontario
- League: Various Junior Leagues
- Operated: 1940s–1982
- Home arena: Brampton Memorial Arena
- Colours: Maroon, Yellow, and White

Franchise history
- unknown–1957: Brampton Regents
- 1957–1966: Brampton 7Ups
- 1966–1970: Brampton Rockets
- 1970–1971: Brampton PCJ's
- 1971–1975: Brampton Vic Woods
- 1975–1980: Brampton Logan Chevys
- 1980–1982: Brampton Warriors Jr. A

Previous franchise history
- 1980–1982: Brampton Warriors Jr. B

The Brampton Warriors are a pair of defunct junior ice hockey teams from Brampton, Ontario, Canada. They were a part of the Ontario Provincial Junior A Hockey League, Central Junior B Hockey League, Metro Junior B Hockey League, and Metro Junior A League. These two teams are the forerunners of the OPJHL's Brampton Capitals.

== History ==
The Warriors began as Brampton Regents during the 1940s playing at the Junior B level. In 1957, the team became sponsored by a local distributor of the 7 Up soft drink. The Brampton 7Ups played in the now defunct Metro Junior A League for two seasons, 1961–62 and 1962-63. Bob Savage was their coach for both seasons. The team returned to the Metro Junior B Hockey League in 1963.

Brampton joined the Central Junior B Hockey League in 1971 during a massive Ontario Hockey Association reshuffling of the Junior "B" ranks. Prior to this, they were members of the Metro Junior B Hockey League. They are the only known member of the Metro league to be affected by the reshuffle as it was mostly done between members of the Central league and the Mid-Ontario Junior B Hockey League.

The Brampton Warriors Jr. A team were an OPJHL team for two seasons in the 1980s. Their 40-6-4 record in the second season would normally be unstoppable, however the Warriors finished in second place in 1981-82 behind a 40-4-6 Guelph Platers team that would make the jump to the Ontario Hockey League the next season. As the Warriors folded for good at the end of the season, the Platers came within arm's reach of winning the National Title.

== Notable alumni ==
Three alumni of the Brampton 7Ups went on to play in the National Hockey League, all of them (Ken Broderick, Andy Brown, and Lyle Carter) were goaltenders playing a combined total of 106 NHL games. Although Andy Brown played in just 62 games in the NHL over the course of three seasons, he will forever be a part of NHL hockey history. Brown carries the distinction of being the last goaltender in the league to play without a protective mask, now a mandatory rule.

List of NHL alumni

- Ken Broderick
- Andy Brown
- Lyle Carter
- Frank Pietrangelo

== Season-by-season results ==
Season	GP	W	L	T	GF	GA	Pts	Results	Playoffs
1950-51	20	8	10	2	84	82	18	3rd Metro B	
1951-52	20	9	9	2	96	84	20	3rd Metro B	
1952-53	30	19	11	0	135	117	38	2nd Metro B	
1953-54	32	21	11	0	147	100	42	3rd Metro B	
1954-55	20	9	8	3	84	63	21	4th Metro B	
1955-56	28	17	9	2	136	80	36	2nd Metro B	Won League
1956-57	24	16	6	2	116	86	34	1st Metro B	
1957-58	24	6	16	2	95	127	14	6th Metro B	
1958-59	28	19	9	0	151	116	38	1st Metro B	
1959-60	28	12	9	7	131	107	31	3rd Metro B	
1960-61	28	12	14	2	130	157	26	5th Metro B	
1961-62	36	11	21	4	143	189	26	4th Metro A	
1962-63	40	12	24	4	157	208	28	6th Metro A	
1963-64	34	14	17	3	139	149	31	8th Metro B	
1964-65	36	17	13	6	164	150	40	3rd Metro B	
1965-66	35	12	16	7	125	159	31	6th Metro B	
1966-67	Did Not Participate								
1967-68	36	8	26	2	153	235	18	9th Metro B	
1968-69	36	6	23	7	113	182	19	9th Metro B	
1969-70	36	9	21	6	170	237	24	8th Metro B	
1970-71	43	5	33	5	156	278	15	11th Metro B	
1971-72	42	20	17	5	191	169	45	4th CJBHL	
1972-73	42	19	18	5	212	219	43	4th CJBHL	
1973-74	42	19	18	5	211	238	43	5th CJBHL	
1974-75	39	16	18	5	214	228	37	3rd CJBHL	
1975-76	36	13	19	4	173	184	30	5th CJBHL	Lost final
1976-77	42	14	24	4	198	230	32	7th CJBHL	DNQ
1977-78	42	12	27	3	184	245	27	7th CJBHL	
1978-79	44	20	20	4	211	204	44	6th CJBHL	
1979-80	44	24	18	2	245	204	50	5th CJBHL	
1980-81	44	20	23	1	268	273	41	7th OPJHL	
1981-82	50	40	6	4	338	174	84	2nd OJHL	

=== Playoffs ===
- 1981 Lost quarter-final

Guelph Platers defeated Brampton Warriors 4-games-to-none

- 1982 Lost quarter-final

Dixie Beehives defeated Brampton Warriors 4-games-to-1

== Junior B Warriors ==
With the renaming and promotion for the Jr. A Warriors, a farm team was created at the Junior B level to feed them. After two years, this team collapsed.

=== Season-by-season results ===
Season	GP	W	L	T	OTL	GF	GA	P	Results	Playoffs
1980-81	44	28	15	1	-	302	198	57	4th CJBHL	
1981-82	40	16	20	4	-	198	248	36	7th CJBHL	
