= Jim Gregory (ice hockey) =

Canadian ice hockey coach and executive (1935–2019)

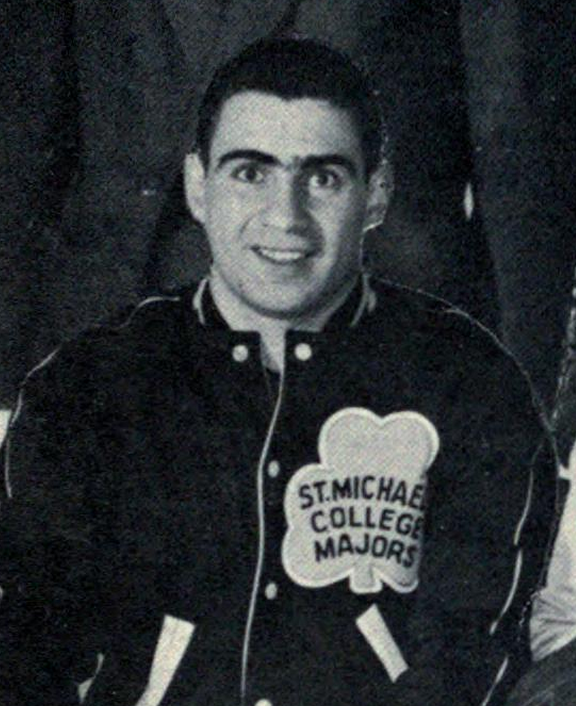
- Gregory as a trainer of the St. Michaels Majors, 1961
- Born: James Michael Gregory; November 4, 1935; Port Colborne, Ontario, Canada
- Died: October 30, 2019 (aged 83); Toronto, Ontario, Canada
- Education: St. Michael's College School
- Occupation: Senior vice-president of NHL hockey operations
- Known for: National Hockey League executive
- Awards: Hockey Hall of Fame (2007)

James Michael Gregory (November 4, 1935 – October 30, 2019) was a Canadian professional ice hockey coach and executive. Born in Port Colborne, Ontario and raised in Dunnville, Ontario, Gregory attended St. Michael's College School in Toronto where he became involved with the school's ice hockey teams, first as a trainer, eventually moving to management and coaching positions. He went on to coach and manage the Toronto Marlboros, winning two championships. He then moved to the National Hockey League's (NHL) Toronto Maple Leafs, serving as their general manager between 1969 and 1979. He led the team to eight playoff appearances during his ten-year tenure. He then moved to the NHL head offices, becoming the director of central scouting, and later took a directorship position in the hockey operations department, which he held until his death.

== Early life ==
Gregory was born in 1935 in Port Colborne, Ontario, and raised in the nearby town of Dunnville, Ontario. His father was born in England and was a Royal Canadian Air Force World War II veteran. Growing up in Dunnville, he developed a passion for hockey, in particular, the Toronto Maple Leafs, listening to Foster Hewitt's broadcasts on Hockey Night in Canada, and developing a relationship with his favourite player, Ted Kennedy. He learned the game from playing road hockey, and later on his local midget hockey team.

== Coaching career ==
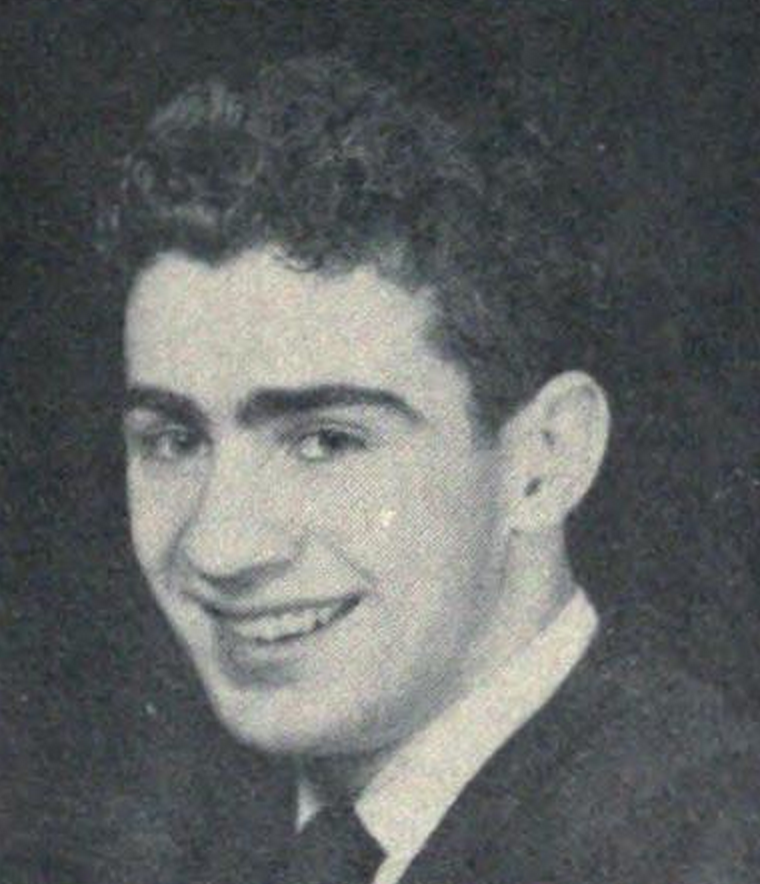
Gregory at St. Michaels College, c. 1954

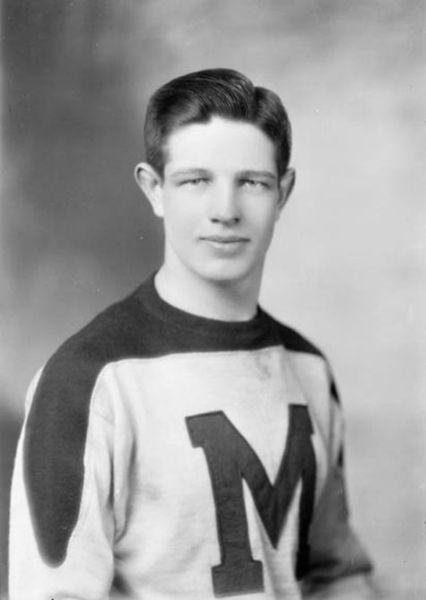
David Bauer, a Catholic priest, teacher, and hockey coach who was Gregory's mentor

In 1952, he relocated to Toronto and attended St. Michael's College School, where he had intentions of playing ice hockey. After failing to place on the school's Junior B hockey team, he joined the Junior A team as a stats keeper and trainer at the insistence of teacher Father David Bauer. In 1961, he took a management position with the team, winning the Memorial Cup in that same year. The following hockey season however, the Majors hockey team withdrew from their league, and Gregory relocated to another high school team, the Toronto Neil McNeil Maroons, winning a championship. When the Maroons were merged into the Toronto Marlboros in 1964, the organization retained Gregory. He coached the club to a Memorial Cup victory that year. Later assuming the management duties as well, he guided the Marlies to another Memorial Cup in 1967. In 1959, while working for Colgate-Palmolive, he gained employment with the Toronto Maple Leafs after an interview with owner Stafford Smythe, which was set up with the assistance of his former school coach, teacher and mentor at St. Michael's, Father Bauer. His duties included maintaining his responsibilities with the Marlies, a Maple Leafs-sponsored team, along with scouting, and working at Smythe's summertime aggregate business.

Gregory was hired in 1967 by the Vancouver Canucks (an affiliate of the Maple Leafs) of the Western Hockey League as head coach. He remained there for one season, compiling a 26–41–5 record, for 5th place in the league. The following year, he became a scout for the Maple Leafs. In spring of 1969, when Punch Imlach was fired as general manager, Gregory was named as his replacement.

== Executive career ==
In Gregory's 10 years as general manager, the Maple Leafs made eight playoff appearances. They also introduced many future stars including Darryl Sittler, Lanny McDonald, Tiger Williams, Ian Turnbull, and Mike Palmateer, during a time which many players defected to the rival league, World Hockey Association. He was one of the first managers to turn to Europe as a source of NHL talent, recruiting defenseman Borje Salming and winger Inge Hammarstrom, in 1973, to play for the Leafs. Gregory was also responsible for introducing a scouting system within the organization, hiring five full-time scouts. However, after the Maple Leafs suffered an elimination in the quarterfinal round of the 1979 Stanley Cup playoffs, Gregory was fired by owner Harold Ballard, and replaced with his predecessor, Punch Imlach. Gregory learned of the news when he received a call from an NHL executive offering him the directorship of the NHL Central Scouting Bureau, unaware that Ballard had fired him.

Recognized for his knowledge of potential European talent for the NHL, Gregory was offered and accepted the position of Director of the NHL Central Scouting Service in 1979, replacing Jack Button. Gregory remained until 1986, when he was named Executive Director of Hockey Operations for the NHL. In 1998, he was named chairman of the Hockey Hall of Fame selection committee and Senior Vice President of Hockey Operations of the NHL. Considered to be a vital part of the NHL's Hockey Operations and Officiating Department, he was known for introducing goal reviews.

== Personal life ==
Gregory was married to Rosalie and they had four children: Andrea, Valerie, Maureen and David. Father Bauer performed the wedding ceremony for the couple.

In 2007, Gregory was elected to the Hockey Hall of Fame as a builder, while he was on a hiatus from the selection committee due to ill health. He was awarded the Order of St. Michael from his alma mater, St. Michael's College School, in 2012. In that same year, the annual Player of the Game awards in the Canadian Hockey League's top prospects games were named after him in recognition for his support of the league.

On February 27, 2009, Gregory was hospitalized after suffering a heart attack, from which he later recovered. In 2011, he was treated for amyloidosis, a blood disorder. He died at his Toronto home on October 30, 2019, five days before his 84th birthday.

== Bibliography ==
- Oliver, Greg (2017). Father Bauer and the Great Experiment: The Genesis of Canadian Olympic Hockey. Toronto, Ontario: ECW Press. ISBN 978-1-77041-249-1.

Preceded by Punch Imlach	General Manager of the Toronto Maple Leafs; 1969–1979	Succeeded by Punch Imlach
