= Metro Junior A League =

Junior ice hockey league

The Metro Junior A League was a junior ice hockey league created in 1961 by Toronto Maple Leafs owner Stafford Smythe in an attempt to rival the OHA, and act as a farm system for his NHL team. The league operated for two seasons from 1961 to 1963. For those two seasons the Metro Junior A League champion won the Father John Conway Memorial Trophy and went on to play the OHA champion for the J. Ross Robertson Cup, and the right to continue on the road to the Memorial Cup.

After two seasons, the calibre of play in the league was subpar, and many of the franchises were still having serious financial problems, while the two old Toronto teams dominated the promoted junior B teams. The Metro experiment was cancelled in 1963 and many of the teams folded. The Toronto Marlboros and Oshawa Generals were readmitted to the OHA for the 1963–64 season.

== 1961–62 season ==
On June 6, 1961,St. Michael's College School which operated the Toronto St. Michael's Majors, chose to leave the OHA Junior A league seeking a shorter schedule with less travel that would impact academic performance of its student athletes. The Toronto Marlboros, who were also owned by Stafford Smythe, also withdrew from the OHA. On June 12, Punch Imlach of the Toronto Maple Leafs announced the formation of a new Metropolitan Jr.A league. Smythe set about finding more teams to fill his league. The league started its first season with five teams, two of which were former OHA Junior A teams, and three promoted Junior B teams. The Marlboros and Majors would be joined by promoted Junior B teams, the Whitby Mohawks, the Brampton 7Ups, and the Unionville Seaforths.

The Marlboros and Majors both supplied players to the new teams in an effort to bring up their standard of competition, but the Majors easily won the league title that year, with the Marlies coming second. The Majors also prevailed in the playoffs against Brampton and the Marlboros. In the 1961–62 J. Ross Robertson Cup series, the Hamilton Red Wings defeated the Majors 4 games to 1.

1961–62 standings

Team	Games	Won	Lost	Tied	Points	Goals for	Goals against
Toronto St. Michael's Majors	33	25	7	1	55	170	91
Toronto Marlboros	33	18	9	6	44	141	103
Whitby Mohawks	36	14	20	2	30	123	170
Brampton 7Ups	36	11	21	4	26	143	189
Unionville Seaforths	36	10	21	5	25	133	157

Playoff results

- Series A: St. Michael's defeated Whitby 8 points to 2.
- Series B: Toronto Marlboros defeated Brampton 8 points to 2.
- Finals: St. Michael's defeated Toronto 8 points to 6.

== 1962–63 season ==
By 1962 financial constraints had forced a re-organizing of the league. The Marlboros and 7Ups remained, but the Whitby Mohawks were renamed the Whitby Dunlops, the Unionville Seaforths became Toronto Knob Hill Farms, and the Majors became the Toronto Neil McNeil Maroons. The new sixth team in the league was the reborn Oshawa Generals team, featuring future Hockey Hall of Fame inductee, 14-year-old Bobby Orr, and playing in Bowmanville as there was no suitable arena in Oshawa. As opposed to the first season of the league, there was little effort to spread teams around the Toronto area, as Knob Hill, Neil McNeil and the Marlboros all called Maple Leaf Gardens home, usually playing doubleheader games on Tuesdays and Sundays.

St. Michael's College School decided to end the Majors program in 1962. The Toronto Maple Leafs prospect players were transferred to Neil McNeil High School with Jim Gregory remaining as coach and director of the Maple Leafs' farm system. The Maroons won the league title, then defeated the Dunlops and Marlboros in the playoffs. In the 1962–63 J. Ross Robertson Cup series, the Niagara Falls Flyers defeated the Maroons 4 games to 2.

1962–63 standings

Team	Games	Won	Lost	Tied	Points	Goals for	Goals against
Toronto Neil McNeil Maroons	40	33	4	3	69	260	110
Toronto Marlboros	40	22	12	6	50	217	159
Toronto Knob Hill Farms	40	14	20	6	34	121	154
Whitby Dunlops	40	11	21	8	30	167	225
Oshawa Generals	40	12	23	5	29	146	222
Brampton 7Ups	40	12	24	4	28	157	208

Playoff results

- Series A: Neil McNeil defeated Knob Hill Farms 8 points to 0.
- Series B: Toronto Marlboros defeated Whitby 8 points to 2.
- Finals: Neil McNeil defeated Toronto Marlboros 8 points to 4.

1962/63 Metro Junior A League All-Star Teams First Team GP-G-A-P (age) Gary Dineen C Neil McNeil Maroons 38-32-63-95 (19) Mike Corbett W Neil McNeil Maroons 37-44-50-94 (20) Duncan MacDonald W Toronto Marlboros 26-20-15-35 (20) Jim McKendry D Neil McNeil Maroons 34-2-17-19 (16) Frank Ridley D Toronto Marlboros 39-11-39-50 (20) Dave Kelly G Knob Hill Farmers 3.85 GAA (19)

Second Team Ron Ellis W Toronto Marlboros 36-21-22-43 (17) Terry Vail C Oshawa Generals 35-28-24-52 (20) Grant Moore W Toronto Marlboros 36-26-30-56 (19) Rod Seiling D Neil McNeil Maroons 38-29-48-77 (18) Bobby Orr D Oshawa Generals 34-6-15-21 (14) Gary Smith G Neil McNeil Maroons 2.35 GAA (19)

== Bibliography ==
- Oliver, Greg (2017). Father Bauer and the Great Experiment: The Genesis of Canadian Olympic Hockey. Toronto, Ontario: ECW Press. ISBN 978-1-77041-249-1.

== See also ==
- Ontario Hockey League history
- List of OHA Junior A standings
