= List of Oshawa Generals seasons =

This is a List of Oshawa Generals seasons.

The Generals celebrated their 70th anniversary during the 2007–08 OHL season. Oshawa has won five Memorial Cups, thirteen J. Ross Robertson Cups, the Hamilton Spectator Trophy three times, and the Leyden Trophy five times.

== Season-by-season results ==
Regular season and playoffs results:

- 1942–1953
- 1962–present

Legend: GP = Games played, W = Wins, L = Losses, T = Ties, OTL = Overtime losses, SL = Shoot-out losses, Pts = Points, GF = Goals for, GA = Goals against

Memorial Cup champions	Memorial Cup finalists	League champions	League finalists

Season	Regular season											Playoffs
Season	GP	W	L	T	OTL	SOL	Pts	Pct	GF	GA	Finish	Playoffs
1937–38	12	8	4	0	–	–	16	0.667	57	42	2nd OHA	Won group semifinal (Toronto Young Rangers) 2–1; Won group final (Toronto Marlboros) 2–1–1; Won OHA final (Guelph Indians) 3–0; Won Eastern Canada semifinal (Sudbury Cub Wolves) 2–1; Won Eastern Canada final (Perth Blue Wings) 2–0; Lost 1938 Memorial Cup series (St. Boniface Seals) 3–2
1938–39	14	13	1	0	–	–	36	0.929	83	27	1st Group 2	Won semifinal (Toronto St. Michael's Majors) 3–1; Won OHA final (Toronto Native Sons) 3–0; Won Eastern Canada semifinal (North Bay Trappers) 2–0; Won Eastern Canada final (Verdun Maple Leafs) 2–1; Won 1939 Memorial Cup series (Edmonton Athletic Club Roamers) 3–1
1939–40	18	15	1	2	–	–	32	0.938	120	46	1st OHA	Won semifinal (Toronto Young Rangers 2–0; Won OHA final (Toronto Marlboros) 3–2; Won Eastern Canada semifinal (South Porcupine Dome Mines) 2–0; Won Eastern Canada final (Verdun Maple Leafs) 2–0; Won 1940 Memorial Cup series (Kenora Thistles) 3–1
1940–41	16	10	4	2	–	–	22	0.714	101	67	2nd OHA	Won semifinal (Toronto Young Rangers 3–2; Won OHA final (Toronto Marlboros) 4–3; Lost Eastern Canada final (Montreal Junior Royals) 3–2
1941–42	24	17	7	0	–	–	34	0.708	143	88	2nd OHA	Won semifinal (Brantford Lions) 4–3; Won OHA final (Guelph Biltmores) 3–2; Won Eastern Canada semifinal (Ottawa St. Patrick's) 3–0; Won Eastern Canada final (Montreal Junior Royals) 4–0; Lost 1942 Memorial Cup series (Portage la Prairie Terriers) 3–1
1942–43	22	17	5	0	–	–	36	0.773	134	72	1st OHA	Won semifinal (Hamilton Whizzers) 4–1; Won OHA final (Brantford Lions) 4–1; Won Eastern Canada semifinal (Ottawa St. Patrick's) 2–0; Won Eastern Canada final (Montreal Junior Canadiens) 3–0; Lost 1943 Memorial Cup series (Winnipeg Rangers) 4–2
1943–44	26	23	3	0	–	–	46	0.885	203	69	1st Group 1	Won semifinal (St. Catharines Falcons) 4–2; Won OHA final (Toronto St. Michael's Majors) 4–1; Won Eastern Canada semifinal (University of Ottawa) 2–0; Won Eastern Canada final (Montreal Junior Royals) 3–1; Won 1944 Memorial Cup series (Trail Smoke Eaters) 4–0
1944–45	20	9	11	0	–	–	18	0.450	75	80	4th OHA	Lost semifinal (Galt Red Wings) 3–0
1945–46	28	17	11	0	–	–	34	0.607	155	101	3rd OHA	Won quarterfinal (St. Catharines Falcons) 3–1; Won semifinal (Toronto Marlboros) 2–0; Lost OHA final (Toronto St. Michael's Majors) 4–2
1946–47	36	28	8	0	–	–	56	0.778	217	109	2nd OHA	Lost semifinal (Toronto St. Michael's Majors) 4–1
1947–48	36	27	8	1	–	–	55	0.764	173	80	2nd OHA	Lost semifinal (Windsor Spitfires) 4–2
1948–49	48	27	18	3	–	–	57	0.594	207	172	3rd OHA	Lost quarterfinal (St. Catharines Teepees) 2–0
1949–50	48	12	34	2	–	–	26	0.271	160	262	9th OHA	Did not qualify
1950–51	54	26	26	2	–	–	54	0.500	250	231	5th OHA	Lost quarterfinal (Windsor Spitfires) 3–2
1951–52	54	7	41	6	–	–	20	0.185	146	281	10th OHA	Did not qualify
1952–53	56	24	29	3	–	–	51	0.455	230	271	6th OHA	Lost quarterfinal (Galt Black Hawks) 3–2
The Oshawa Generals did not operate from 1953 to 1962.
1962–63	40	12	23	5	–	–	29	0.362	146	222	5th Metro Jr. A	Did not qualify
1963–64	56	22	28	6	–	–	50	0.446	236	246	6th OHA	Lost quarterfinal (St. Catharines Black Hawks) 4–2
1964–65	56	23	24	9	–	–	55	0.491	224	233	4th OHA	Lost semifinal (Niagara Falls Flyers) 4–2
1965–66	48	22	18	8	–	–	52	0.542	217	178	4th OHA	Won quarterfinal (St. Catharines Black Hawks) 4–3; Won semifinal (Montreal Junior Canadiens) 4–1; Won OHA final (Kitchener Rangers) 4–1; Won Eastern Canada semifinal (North Bay Trappers) 4–0. Won Eastern Canada final (Shawinigan Falls Bruins) 3–1; Lost 1966 Memorial Cup series (Edmonton Oil Kings) 4–2
1966–67	48	12	26	10	–	–	34	0.354	138	192	9th OHA	Did not qualify
1967–68	54	12	37	5	–	–	29	0.269	177	310	9th OHA	Did not qualify
1968–69	54	18	28	8	–	–	44	0.407	233	268	9th OHA	Did not qualify
1969–70	54	17	27	10	–	–	44	0.407	213	252	8th OHA	Won eighth-place tie-breaker game (Hamilton Red Wings) 5–4 (OT); Lost quarterfinal (Toronto Marlboros) 4–0–1
1970–71	62	18	37	7	–	–	46	0.347	232	316	9th OHA	Did not qualify
1971–72	63	35	18	10	–	–	80	0.635	296	251	2nd OHA	Won quarterfinal (Niagara Falls Flyers) 8–4; Lost semifinal (Ottawa 67's) 9–3
1972–73	63	23	32	8	–	–	54	0.429	295	310	6th OHA	Lost quarterfinal (Peterborough Petes) 8–0
1973–74	70	33	29	8	–	–	74	0.529	283	275	6th OHA	Lost quarterfinal (St. Catharines Black Hawks) 9–1
1974–75	70	28	33	9	–	–	65	0.464	288	306	7th OMJHL	Lost quarterfinal (Peterborough Petes) 8–2
1975–76	66	31	27	8	–	–	70	0.530	312	299	4th Leyden	Lost preliminary round (Sault Ste. Marie Greyhounds) 6–4
1976–77	66	5	57	4	–	–	14	0.106	216	444	6th Leyden	Did not qualify
1977–78	68	30	26	12	–	–	72	0.529	320	289	3rd Leyden	Lost quarterfinal (Peterborough Petes) 9–3
1978–79	68	37	30	1	–	–	75	0.551	367	326	3rd Leyden	Lost quarterfinal (Sudbury Wolves) 8–2
1979–80	68	42	26	0	–	–	84	0.618	329	275	3rd Leyden	Lost quarterfinal (Ottawa 67's) 4–3
1980–81	68	35	30	3	–	–	73	0.537	321	352	4th Leyden	Won division quarterfinal (Peterborough Petes) 3–2; Lost division semifinal (Sault Ste. Marie Greyhounds) 8–4
1981–82	68	40	26	2	–	–	82	0.603	335	296	2nd Leyden	Won division quarterfinal (Peterborough Petes) 8–2; Lost division semifinal (Ottawa 67's) 8–6
1982–83	70	45	22	3	–	–	93	0.664	380	255	3rd Leyden	Won division quarterfinal (Belleville Bulls) 7–1; Won division semifinal (Peterborough Petes) 8–0; Won division final (Ottawa 67's) 8–2; Won OHL final (Sault Ste. Marie Greyhounds) 9–5; Lost 1983 Memorial Cup final (Portland Winter Hawks) 8–3
1983–84	70	37	32	1	–	–	75	0.536	315	297	4th Leyden	Won division quarterfinal (Belleville Bulls) 6–0; Lost division semifinal (Ottawa 67's) 8–0
1984–85	66	32	32	2	–	–	66	0.500	271	259	5th Leyden	Lost division quarterfinal (Belleville Bulls) 8–2
1985–86	66	37	27	2	–	–	76	0.576	285	257	2nd Leyden	Lost division quarterfinal (Kingston Canadians) 8–4
1986–87	66	49	14	3	–	–	101	0.765	322	201	1st Leyden	Won Super Series to host 1987 Memorial Cup (North Bay Centennials) 4–3; Bye through division quarterfinal Won division semifinal (Kingston Canadians) 4–2; Won division final (Peterborough Petes) 4–2; Won OHL final (North Bay Centennials) 4–3; Lost 1987 Memorial Cup final (Medicine Hat Tigers) 6–2
1987–88	66	32	31	3	–	–	67	0.508	278	288	5th Leyden	Lost division quarterfinal (Ottawa 67's) 4–3
1988–89	66	36	24	6	–	–	78	0.591	337	286	2nd Leyden	Lost division quarterfinal (Ottawa 67's) 4–2
1989–90	66	42	20	4	–	–	88	0.667	334	244	1st Leyden	Won division quarterfinal (Cornwall Royals) 4–2; Bye through division semifinal Won division final (Peterborough Petes) 4–0; Won OHL final (Kitchener Rangers) 4–3; Won 1990 Memorial Cup final (Kitchener Rangers) 4–3 (2OT)
1990–91	66	47	13	6	–	–	100	0.758	382	233	1st Leyden	Won division quarterfinal (Sudbury Wolves) 4–1; Bye through division semifinal Won division final (Ottawa 67's) 4–1; Lost OHL final (Sault Ste. Marie Greyhounds) 4–2
1991–92	66	31	26	9	–	–	71	0.538	274	273	5th Leyden	Lost division quarterfinal (Sudbury Wolves) 4–3
1992–93	66	33	28	5	–	–	71	0.538	270	268	3rd Leyden	Won division quarterfinal (Belleville Bulls) 4–3; Lost division semifinal (Kingston Frontenacs) 4–2
1993–94	66	26	32	8	–	–	60	0.455	272	309	6th Leyden	Lost division quarterfinal (Sudbury Wolves) 4–1
1994–95	66	40	21	5	–	–	85	0.644	300	242	2nd East	Lost division quarterfinal (Peterborough Petes) 4–3
1995–96	66	30	28	8	–	–	68	0.515	248	238	4th East	Lost division quarterfinal (Belleville Bulls) 4–1
1996–97	66	41	18	7	–	–	89	0.674	287	202	2nd East	Bye through division quarterfinal Won quarterfinal (Peterborough Petes) 4–2; Won semifinal (Kitchener Rangers) 4–2; Won OHL final (Ottawa 67's) 4–2; Lost 1997 Memorial Cup semifinal (Lethbridge Hurricanes) 5–4 (OT)
1997–98	66	26	32	8	–	–	60	0.455	214	247	4th East	Lost division quarterfinal (Kingston Frontenacs) 4–3
1998–99	68	39	24	5	–	–	83	0.610	280	217	3rd East	Won conference quarterfinal (Peterborough Petes) 4–1; Won conference semifinal (Barrie Colts) 4–3; Lost conference final (Belleville Bulls) 4–1
1999–2000	68	32	30	4	2	–	70	0.500	227	224	5th East	Lost conference quarterfinal (Ottawa 67's) 4–1
2000–01	68	20	36	7	5	–	52	0.346	184	254	5th East	Did not qualify
2001–02	68	23	33	7	5	–	58	0.390	205	247	4th East	Lost conference quarterfinal (Belleville Bulls) 4–1
2002–03	68	34	30	2	2	–	72	0.515	243	225	4th East	Won conference quarterfinal (Peterborough Petes) 4–3; Lost conference semifinal (Ottawa 67's) 4–2
2003–04	68	30	29	8	1	–	69	0.500	188	206	3rd East	Lost conference quarterfinal (Mississauga Ice Dogs) 4–3
2004–05	68	15	48	3	2	–	35	0.243	173	289	5th East	Did not qualify
2005–06	68	18	45	–	4	1	41	0.301	233	330	5th East	Did not qualify
2006–07	68	31	29	–	3	5	70	0.515	292	320	2nd East	Won conference quarterfinal (Kingston Frontenacs) 4–1; Lost conference semifinal (Belleville Bulls) 4–0
2007–08	68	38	17	–	6	7	89	0.654	290	262	2nd East	Won conference quarterfinal (Ottawa 67's) 4–0; Won conference semifinal (Niagara IceDogs) 4–2; Lost conference final (Belleville Bulls) 4–1
2008–09	68	25	35	–	2	5	57	0.426	213	282	4th East	Did not qualify
2009–10	68	24	39	–	3	2	53	0.390	216	299	4th East	Did not qualify
2010–11	68	39	19	–	4	6	88	0.647	273	240	2nd East	Won conference quarterfinal (Kingston Frontenacs) 4–1; Lost conference semifinal (Niagara IceDogs) 4–1
2011–12	68	31	30	–	4	3	69	0.507	242	241	4th East	Lost conference quarterfinal (Niagara IceDogs) 4–2
2012–13	68	42	22	–	1	3	88	0.647	235	192	2nd East	Won conference quarterfinal (Niagara IceDogs) 4–1; Lost conference semifinal (Barrie Colts) 4–0
2013–14	68	42	20	–	0	6	90	0.662	232	187	1st East	Won conference quarterfinal (Mississauga Steelheads) 4–0; Won conference semifinal (Peterborough Petes) 4–0; Lost conference final (North Bay Battalion) 4–0
2014–15	68	51	11	–	2	4	108	0.794	292	157	1st East	Won conference quarterfinal (Peterborough Petes) 4–1; Won conference semifinal (Niagara IceDogs) 4–1; Won conference final (North Bay Battalion) 4–2; Won OHL final (Erie Otters) 4–1; Won 2015 Memorial Cup final (Kelowna Rockets) 2–1 (OT)
2015–16	68	27	33	–	4	4	62	0.456	197	235	4th East	Lost conference quarterfinal (Kingston Frontenacs) 4–1
2016–17	68	40	23	–	3	2	85	0.625	228	215	2nd East	Won conference quarterfinal (Sudbury Wolves) 4–2; Lost conference semifinal (Mississauga Steelheads) 4–1
2017–18	68	36	29	–	3	0	75	0.551	250	243	3rd East	Lost conference quarterfinal (Niagara IceDogs) 4–1
2018–19	68	44	20	–	4	0	92	0.676	288	216	2nd East	Won conference quarterfinal (Peterborough Petes) 4–1; Won conference semifinal (Niagara IceDogs) 4–2; Lost conference final (Ottawa 67's) 4–0
2019–20	62	31	20	–	6	5	73	0.589	229	227	3rd East	Playoffs cancelled due to the COVID-19 pandemic
2020–21	Season cancelled due to the COVID-19 pandemic											
2021–22	68	30	31	–	2	5	67	0.493	215	240	3rd East	Lost conference quarterfinal (Kingston Frontenacs) 4–2
2022–23	68	26	36	–	1	5	58	0.426	235	290	4th East	Lost conference quarterfinal (Ottawa 67's) 4–1
2023–24	68	40	19	–	7	2	89	0.654	273	204	1st East	Won conference quarterfinal (Barrie Colts) 4–2; Won conference semifinal (Ottawa 67's) 4–0; Won conference final (North Bay Battalion) 4–3; Lost OHL final (London Knights) 4–0
2024–25	68	41	21	–	4	2	88	0.647	261	218	3rd East	Won conference quarterfinal (Brampton Steelheads) 4–2; Won conference semifinal (Brantford Bulldogs) 4–2; Won conference final (Barrie Colts) 4–0; Lost OHL final (London Knights) 4–1
2025–26	68	19	45	–	3	1	42	0.309	177	273	5th East	Did not qualify

== Sources ==
- Lapp, Richard M.; Macaulay, Alec (1997). The Memorial Cup: Canada's National Junior Hockey Championship. Madeira Park, British Columbia: Harbour Publishing. ISBN 1-55017-170-4.
