= List of NHL players (K) =

This is a list of National Hockey League (NHL) players who have played at the least one game in the NHL from 1917 to present and have a last name that starts with "K".

List updated as of the 2023–24 NHL season.

== Ka ==
- Jari Kaarela
- Robert Kabel
- Frantisek Kaberle
- Tomas Kaberle
- Mark Kachowski
- Eddie Kachur
- Nazem Kadri
- Trent Kaese
- Kaapo Kahkonen
- Dominik Kahun
- Alexei Kaigorodov
- Vern Kaiser
- Wyatt Kaiser
- Kaapo Kakko
- Walter "Jeff" Kalbfleisch
- Alex Kaleta
- Patrick Kaleta
- Dmitri Kalinin
- Sergey Kalinin
- Jon Kalinski
- Arthur Kaliyev
- Erik Kallgren
- Tomi Kallio
- Anders Kallur
- Petr Kalus
- Wyatt Kalynuk
- Vladislav Kamenev
- Valeri Kamensky
- Kevin Kaminski
- Max Kaminsky
- Yan Kaminsky
- David Kampf
- Steven Kampfer
- Rudolph "Bingo" Kampman
- Hannu Kamppuri
- Tomas Kana
- Boyd Kane
- Evander Kane
- Frank "Red" Kane
- Patrick Kane
- Petr Kanko
- Gordon Kannegiesser
- Sheldon Kannegiesser
- Kasperi Kapanen
- Niko Kapanen
- Sami Kapanen
- Michael Kapla
- Kirill Kaprizov
- Ladislav Karabin
- Mike Karakas
- Jere Karalahti
- Vitali Karamnov
- Paul Kariya
- Steve Kariya
- Kyosti Karjalainen
- Al Karlander
- Andreas Karlsson
- Erik Karlsson
- Henrik Karlsson
- Linus Karlsson
- Melker Karlsson
- William Karlsson
- Fredrik Karlstrom
- Dave Karpa
- Valeri Karpov
- Alexander Karpovtsev
- Martins Karsums
- Tye Kartye
- Alexei Kasatonov
- Jason Kasdorf
- David Kase
- Ondrej Kase
- Kasimir Kaskisuo
- Marco Kasper
- Steve Kasper
- Matt Kassian
- Zack Kassian
- Ed Kastelic
- Mark Kastelic
- Mike Kaszycki
- Boris Katchouk
- Mark Katic
- Martin Kaut
- Pat Kavanagh

== Ke ==
- Ed Kea
- Joey Keane
- Mike Keane
- Doug Keans
- Bracken Kearns
- Dennis Kearns
- Jackie Keating
- John "Red" Keating
- Mike Keating
- Gordon "Duke" Keats
- Dan Keczmer
- Sheldon Keefe
- Melville "Butch" Keeling
- Don Keenan
- Larry Keenan
- Brady Keeper
- Matt Keetley
- Rick Kehoe
- Duncan Keith
- Matt Keith
- Jarmo Kekalainen
- Milos Kelemen
- Chris Kelleher
- Clayton Keller
- Ralph Keller
- Ryan Keller
- Christer Kellgren
- Joel Kellman
- Bob Kelly (born 1946)
- Bob Kelly (born 1950)
- Dave Kelly
- John-Paul Kelly
- Leonard "Red" Kelly
- Parker Kelly
- Pete Kelly
- Pep Kelly
- Steve Kelly
- Kevin Kemp
- Philip Kemp
- Stan Kemp
- Adrian Kempe
- Mario Kempe
- Michal Kempny
- Joonas Kemppainen
- Chris Kenady
- Bill Kendall
- Dean Kennedy
- Forbes Kennedy
- Mike Kennedy
- Sheldon Kennedy
- Ted Kennedy
- Tim Kennedy
- Tyler Kennedy
- Ernie Kenny
- Dave Keon
- Michael Keranen
- Alexander Kerch
- Nicolas Kerdiles
- Alexander Kerfoot
- Tanner Kero
- Alan Kerr
- Dave Kerr
- Reg Kerr
- Tim Kerr
- Dan Kesa
- Ryan Kesler
- Matthew Kessel
- Phil Kessel
- Rick Kessell
- Michael Kesselring
- Veli-Pekka Ketola
- Kerry Ketter

== Kh–Ki ==
- Nikolai Khabibulin
- Jujhar Khaira
- Sergei Kharin
- Alexander Kharitonov
- Alexander Khavanov
- Yuri Khmylev
- Alexander Khokhlachev
- Dmitri Khristich
- Anton Khudobin
- Marat Khusnutdinov
- Ian Kidd
- Trevor Kidd
- Matt Kiersted
- Udo Kiessling
- Chad Kilger
- Alexander Killorn
- Brian Kilrea
- Hec Kilrea
- Ken Kilrea
- Wally Kilrea
- Darin Kimble
- Jakub Kindl
- Bryce Kindopp
- Orest Kindrachuk
- Derek King
- Dwight King
- Frank King
- Jason King
- Kris King
- Scott King
- Steven King
- Wayne King
- Keith Kinkaid
- Geordie Kinnear
- Geoff Kinrade
- Brian Kinsella
- Ray Kinsella
- Marko Kiprusoff
- Miikka Kiprusoff
- Bobby Kirk
- Justin Kirkland
- Bob Kirkpatrick
- Mark Kirton
- Bogdan Kiselevich
- Kelly Kisio
- Bill Kitchen
- Chapman "Hobie" Kitchen
- Mike Kitchen
- Joel Kiviranta
- Matiss Kivlenieks

== Kj–Kn ==
- Patric Kjellberg
- Adam Klapka
- Linus Klasen
- Ralph Klassen
- Trent Klatt
- Ken Klee
- Oscar Klefbom
- Kevin Klein
- Lloyd "Dede" Klein
- Scot Kleinendorst
- Terry Kleisinger
- Anton Klementyev
- Jon Klemm
- Jakub Klepis
- Rostislav Klesla
- Tyler Kleven
- Petr Klima
- Morgan Klimchuk
- Sergei Klimovich
- Ike Klingbeil
- Carl Klingberg
- Rob Klinkhammer
- Justin Kloos
- Tomas Kloucek
- Joe Klukay
- Gord Kluzak
- Julian Klymkiw
- Connor Knapp
- Samuel Knazko
- Artemi Kniazev
- Bill Knibbs
- Rick Knickle
- Matthew Knies
- Corban Knight
- Spencer Knight
- Fred Knipscheer
- William "Nick" Knott
- Paul Knox
- Mike Knuble
- Espen Knutsen
- Nikolai Knyzhov

== Ko ==
- Matt Koalska
- Chuck Kobasew
- Patrik Koch
- Dieter Kochan
- Pyotr Kochetkov
- David Koci
- Joe Kocur
- Greg Koehler
- Slater Koekkoek
- Cole Koepke
- Dustin Kohn
- Ladislav Kohn
- Ville Koistinen
- Tom Koivisto
- Mikko Koivu
- Saku Koivu
- Otto Koivula
- Krys Kolanos
- Chad Kolarik
- Pavel Kolarik
- Keegan Kolesar
- Mark Kolesar
- Vitali Kolesnik
- Juraj Kolnik
- Dean Kolstad
- Konstantin Koltsov
- Vladislav Kolyachonok
- Olaf Kolzig
- Neil Komadoski
- Zenith Komarniski
- Leo Komarov
- Mike Komisarek
- Matt Konan
- Maxim Kondratyev
- Travis Konecny
- George Konik
- Zenon Konopka
- Steve Konowalchuk
- Steve Konroyd
- Evgeny Konstantinov
- Vladimir Konstantinov
- Petri Kontiola
- Chris Kontos
- Russ Kopak
- Tomas Kopecky
- Anze Kopitar
- Joona Koppanen
- Jerry Korab
- Kevin Korchinski
- Kaedan Korczak
- Dan Kordic
- John Kordic
- Josef Korenar
- Jim Korn
- Mike Korney
- Evgeny Korolev
- Igor Korolev
- Cliff Koroll
- Alexander Korolyuk
- Lauri Korpikoski
- Joonas Korpisalo
- Egor Korshkov
- Roger Kortko
- Scott Kosmachuk
- Kalle Kossila
- Klim Kostin
- Andrei Kostitsyn
- Sergei Kostitsyn
- Michael Kostka
- Tom Kostopoulos
- Doug Kostynski
- Ales Kotalik
- Dick Kotanen
- Jesperi Kotkaniemi
- Chris Kotsopoulos
- Johnathan Kovacevic
- Ilya Kovalchuk
- Andrei Kovalenko
- Alexei Kovalev
- Joe Kowal
- Don Kozak
- Les Kozak
- Viktor Kozlov
- Vyacheslav Kozlov

== Kr ==
- Milan Kraft
- Ryan Kraft
- Steve Kraftcheck
- Brent Krahn
- Lukas Krajicek
- Skip Krake
- Filip Kral
- Igor Kravchuk
- Mikhail Kravets
- Vitali Kravtsov
- Peyton Krebs
- Chris Kreider
- David Krejci
- Dale Krentz
- Peyton Krebs
- Kamil Kreps
- Jordan Krestanovich
- Jaroslav Kristek
- Sergei Krivokrasov
- Jason Krog
- Joe Krol
- Richard Kromm
- Robert Kron
- Niklas Kronwall
- Staffan Kronwall
- Kevin Krook
- Vlastimil Kroupa
- Torey Krug
- Marcus Kruger
- Jim Krulicki
- Uwe Krupp
- Gord Kruppke
- Paul Kruse
- Mike Krushelnyski
- Vladimir Krutov
- Todd Krygier
- Dave Kryskow
- Ed Kryzanowski

== Ku–Ky ==
- Filip Kuba
- Dominik Kubalik
- Tomas Kubalik
- Pavel Kubina
- Frantisek Kucera
- Nikita Kucherov
- Alexei Kudashov
- Bob Kudelski
- Kristian Kudroc
- Darcy Kuemper
- Ryan Kuffner
- Karson Kuhlman
- Gordon "Doggie" Kuhn
- Tom Kuhnhackl
- Dean Kukan
- Lasse Kukkonen
- Aggie Kukulowicz
- Brett Kulak
- Stu Kulak
- Arturs Kulda
- Nikolay Kulemin
- Mikhail Kuleshov
- Jiri Kulich
- Dmitri Kulikov
- Arnie Kullman
- Ed Kullman
- Jarno Kultanen
- Mark Kumpel
- Tomas Kundratek
- Luke Kunin
- Chris Kunitz
- Les Kuntar
- Alan Kuntz
- Murray Kuntz
- Cody Kunyk
- Janne Kuokkanen
- Rasmus Kupari
- Sean Kuraly
- Philipp Kurashev
- Tomas Kurka
- Jari Kurri
- Gary Kurt
- Orland Kurtenbach
- Justin Kurtz
- Tom Kurvers
- Merve Kuryluk
- Dale Kushner
- Zdenek Kutlak
- Andrei Kuzmenko
- Evgeny Kuznetsov
- Maxim Kuznetsov
- Yan Kuznetsov
- Greg Kuznik
- Ken Kuzyk
- Dmitri Kvartalnov
- Oleg Kvasha
- Joel Kwiatkowski
- Larry "King" Kwong
- Bill Kyle
- Walter "Gus" Kyle
- Oliver Kylington
- Markku Kyllonen
- Nick Kypreos
- Jordan Kyrou
- Jim Kyte
- Milan Kytnar
