= Hamilton Spectator Trophy =

Ontario Hockey League award

- Sport: Ice hockey
- Awarded for: Team with the best regular season record (1st place overall)

History
- First award: 1958
- Most recent: Brantford Bulldogs

The Hamilton Spectator Trophy is awarded annually by the Ontario Hockey League to the team that finishes the regular season with the best record. The trophy was donated by The Hamilton Spectator, and first presented in the 1957–58 season. It is symbolic of first place overall, and home-ice advantage throughout the playoffs.

== Winners ==
List of winners of the Hamilton Spectator Trophy.

Season	Team	GP	W	L	T	OTL	Pts	GF	GA
1957–58	St. Catharines Teepees	52	32	14	6	—	70	246	174
1958–59	St. Catharines Teepees	54	40	11	3	—	84	257	175
1959–60	Toronto Marlboros	48	28	17	3	—	59	222	180
1960–61	Guelph Royals	48	30	9	9	—	69	255	165
1961–62	Montreal Junior Canadiens	50	34	11	5	—	73	230	138
1962–63	Niagara Falls Flyers	50	31	12	7	—	69	212	146
1963–64	Toronto Marlboros	56	40	9	7	—	87	336	195
1964–65	Niagara Falls Flyers	56	36	11	9	—	81	236	168
1965–66	Peterborough Petes	48	24	14	10	—	58	211	171
1966–67	Kitchener Rangers	48	28	12	8	—	64	213	164
1967–68	Kitchener Rangers	54	38	10	6	—	82	326	175
1968–69	Montreal Junior Canadiens	54	37	11	6	—	80	303	171
1969–70	Montreal Junior Canadiens	54	37	12	5	—	79	316	200
1970–71	Peterborough Petes	62	41	13	8	—	90	290	174
1971–72	Toronto Marlboros	63	45	15	3	—	93	363	256
1972–73	Toronto Marlboros	63	47	7	9	—	103	416	199
1973–74	Kitchener Rangers	70	43	18	9	—	95	377	229
1974–75	Toronto Marlboros	70	48	13	9	—	105	469	303
1975–76	Sudbury Wolves	66	47	11	8	—	102	384	224
1976–77	St. Catharines Fincups	66	50	11	5	—	105	438	242
1977–78	Ottawa 67's	68	43	18	7	—	93	405	308
1978–79	Peterborough Petes	68	46	19	3	—	95	341	245
1979–80	Peterborough Petes	68	47	20	1	—	95	316	238
1980–81	Sault Ste. Marie Greyhounds	68	47	19	2	—	96	412	290
1981–82	Ottawa 67's	68	47	19	2	—	96	353	248
1982–83	Sault Ste. Marie Greyhounds	70	48	21	1	—	97	363	270
1983–84	Kitchener Rangers	70	52	16	2	—	106	418	276
1984–85	Sault Ste. Marie Greyhounds	66	54	11	1	—	109	381	215
1985–86	Peterborough Petes	66	45	19	2	—	92	298	190
1986–87	Oshawa Generals	66	49	14	3	—	101	322	201
1987–88	Windsor Compuware Spitfires	66	50	14	2	—	102	396	215
1988–89	Kitchener Rangers	66	41	19	6	—	88	318	251
1989–90	Oshawa Generals	66	42	20	4	—	88	334	244
1990–91	Oshawa Generals	66	47	13	6	—	100	382	233
1991–92	Peterborough Petes	66	41	18	7	—	89	319	256
1992–93	Peterborough Petes	66	46	15	5	—	97	352	239
1993–94	North Bay Centennials	66	46	15	5	—	97	351	226
1994–95	Guelph Storm	66	47	14	5	—	99	330	200
1995–96	Guelph Storm	66	45	16	5	—	95	297	186
1996–97	Ottawa 67's	66	49	11	6	—	104	320	177
1997–98	Guelph Storm	66	42	18	6	—	90	263	189
1998–99	Plymouth Whalers	68	51	13	4	—	106	313	162
1999–2000	Plymouth Whalers	68	45	18	4	1	95	256	172
2000–01	Erie Otters	68	45	11	10	2	102	264	171
2001–02	Plymouth Whalers	68	39	15	12	2	92	249	166
2002–03	Kitchener Rangers	68	46	14	5	3	100	275	188
2003–04	London Knights	68	53	11	2	2	110	300	147
2004–05	London Knights	68	59	7	2	0	120	310	125
Season	Team	GP	W	L	OTL	SL	Pts	GF	GA
2005–06	London Knights	68	49	15	1	3	102	304	211
2006–07	London Knights	68	50	14	1	3	104	311	231
2007–08	Kitchener Rangers	68	53	11	1	3	110	289	174
2008–09	Windsor Spitfires	68	57	10	0	1	115	311	171
2009–10	Barrie Colts	68	57	9	0	2	116	327	186
2010–11	Mississauga St. Michael's Majors	68	53	13	0	2	108	287	170
2011–12	London Knights	68	49	18	0	1	99	277	178
2012–13	London Knights	68	50	13	2	3	105	279	180
2013–14	Guelph Storm	68	52	12	2	2	108	340	191
2014–15	Sault Ste. Marie Greyhounds	68	54	12	0	2	110	342	196
2015–16	Erie Otters	68	52	15	1	0	105	269	183
2016–17	Erie Otters	68	50	15	2	1	103	319	182
2017–18	Sault Ste. Marie Greyhounds	68	55	7	3	3	116	317	186
2018–19	Ottawa 67's	68	50	12	4	2	106	296	183
2019–20	Ottawa 67's	62	50	11	0	1	101	296	165
2020–21	Not awarded, season cancelled due to COVID-19 pandemic								
2021–22	Hamilton Bulldogs	68	51	12	3	2	107	300	176
2022–23	Ottawa 67's	68	51	12	3	2	107	286	171
2023–24	London Knights	68	50	14	1	3	104	322	197
2024–25	London Knights	68	55	11	2	0	112	325	180
2025–26	Brantford Bulldogs	68	48	10	8	2	106	296	190

== First place overall, 1938–1958 ==
List of teams finishing first place in the OHA Junior A tier from 1933 to 1958.

Season	Team	GP	W	L	T	Pts	GF	GA
1938–39	Oshawa Generals	14	13	1	0	36	83	27
1939–40	Oshawa Generals	18	15	1	2	32	120	46
1940–41	Toronto Marlboros	17	13	3	1	25	113	51
1941–42	Brantford Lions	24	19	5	0	38	183	83
1942–43	Oshawa Generals	22	17	5	0	36	134	72
1943–44	Oshawa Generals	26	23	3	0	46	203	69
1944–45	Toronto St. Michael's Majors	19	18	1	0	36	174	54
1945–46	Toronto St. Michael's Majors	28	26	2	0	52	199	54
1946–47	Toronto St. Michael's Majors	36	33	3	0	66	234	59
1947–48	Windsor Spitfires	36	29	6	1	59	231	124
1948–49	Windsor Spitfires	48	34	13	1	69	272	184
1949–50	Toronto Marlboros	48	37	9	2	76	253	119
1950–51	Barrie Flyers	54	38	14	2	78	276	161
1951–52	Toronto Marlboros	53	39	8	6	84	302	146
1952–53	Barrie Flyers	56	37	17	2	76	258	187
1953–54	St. Catharines Teepees	59	42	15	2	86	308	211
1954–55	St. Catharines Teepees	49	32	15	2	66	260	176
1955–56	St. Catharines Teepees	48	28	17	3	59	219	197
1956–57	Guelph Biltmores	52	37	12	3	77	237	143

== See also ==
- Jean Rougeau Trophy - QMJHL
- Scotty Munro Memorial Trophy - WHL
- List of Canadian Hockey League awards
