= St. Catharines Falcons =

St. Catharines Falcons may refer to one of these junior hockey teams:

- St. Catharines Falcons (1943–1947)
- St. Catharines Falcons (1968)
