= Carl Smith (ice hockey) =

Canadian ice hockey player

- Born: September 18, 1917 Cache Bay, Ontario, Canada
- Died: January 9, 1967 (aged 49) Omaha, Nebraska, U.S.
- Height: 5 ft 5 in (165 cm)
- Weight: 150 lb (68 kg; 10 st 10 lb)
- Position: Right wing
- Shot: Left
- Played for: Detroit Red Wings
- Playing career: 1939–1949

Carl David "Winky" Smith (September 18, 1917 – January 9, 1967) was an ice hockey winger who played in seven games in the National Hockey League for the Detroit Red Wings in 1943. Smith picked up his nickname when he played on the same line as Ray Powell for the Omaha Knights following World War II. His brother Dalton "Nakina" Smith, played with him on many occasions throughout his career.

== Professional career ==
=== Minor league hockey ===
Smith was small in size, but more than made up for it with his stellar play on the ice. After spending time with the St. Michael's Majors in the junior league of the Ontario Hockey Association he began play for the Oshawa G-Men of the senior league in the 1935–36 season. He continued to excel on the ice and was finally noticed after a stellar season in which he scored 30 points in just 18 games. Smith was contacted by the Detroit Red Wings on his birthday and signed as a free agent just nine days later. He was to begin play for the Wings in their farm system, starting with the Detroit Holzbaugh Ford of the Michigan-Ontario Hockey Association in the 1939–40 season. Smith averaged more than a point per game pace for the first 31 games of the season. Smith started the next season in the American Hockey Association with the first place St. Louis Flyers and playing for the first time with his brother, Dalton. Smith and his brother helped keep the Flyers in first place for the next two years, including helping them win the Harry F. Sinclair Trophy, given to the league champions, in 1940–41. For the 1942–43 season, Smith finally made the jump to the American Hockey League along with Dalton to begin play for the New Haven Eagles, but end the season playing for the Buffalo Bisons, all while scoring 38 points. He also helped lead the Bisons to win the AHL championship and the Calder Cup with his 9 playoff points.

=== Playing in the NHL ===
Finally in 1943, while having begun play for the Indianapolis Capitols (again reuniting with his brother), the Smith brothers were called up to play for the Detroit Red Wings of the National Hockey League. Carl contributed a goal and an assist in seven games, but still found himself back down in the minors. He finished out the season with the Capitols and ended up with another point per game season. In 1944–45, Smith again joined the St. Louis Flyers and ended with 10 goals and 26 assists.

For the 1945–46 season, Smith made the jump to the United States Hockey League (USHL), after a short stint with the Capitols again, and joined play for the Omaha Knights. He was an instant success scoring 29 goals and 67 points in 54 games to lead the team in scoring. He was named to the USHL First All-Star Team. He also scored in three goals in the Knights playoff run, losing to the Kansas City Pla-mors. The following season the Knights acquired Nelson Boyce who would befriend Smith and form a strong scoring duo that would stay together for the next two years. They spent so much time together, the pair became known as Blinky and Winky to teammates and fans. After two more successful seasons with the Knights, and two more postseason losses to the Pla-mors, Smith decided to retire from playing ice hockey at the end of the 1948–49 season.

== Career statistics ==
=== Regular season and playoffs ===
			Regular season					Playoffs
Season	Team	League	GP	G	A	Pts	PIM	GP	G	A	Pts	PIM
1933–34	St. Michael's Majors	M-Cup	—	—	—	—	—	13	16	13	29	4
1934–35	St. Michael's Majors	OHA	12	9	2	11	8	3	3	1	4	4
1935–36	Oshawa Chevies	TIHL	13	4	4	8	12	—	—	—	—	—
1936–37	Oshawa G-Men	TIHL	9	3	1	4	12	—	—	—	—	—
1937–38	Oshawa G-Men	OHA Sr	16	14	10	24	16	2	0	0	0	4
1938–39	Oshawa G-Men	OHA Sr	18	12	18	30	37	7	1	4	5	6
1939–40	Detroit Holzbaugh	MOHL	31	16	16	32	14	12	3	4	7	28
1940–41	St. Louis Flyers	AHA	48	21	19	40	18	9	2	3	5	6
1941–42	St. Louis Flyers	AHA	50	11	17	28	43	2	1	1	2	0
1942–43	New Haven Eagles	AHL	31	4	12	16	13	—	—	—	—	—
1942–43	Buffalo Bisons	AHL	22	10	12	22	8	9	2	7	9	0
1943–44	Detroit Red Wings	NHL	7	1	1	2	2	—	—	—	—	—
1943–44	Indianapolis Capitals	AHL	45	20	26	46	20	5	1	4	5	2
1944–45	St. Louis Flyers	AHL	58	10	26	36	23	—	—	—	—	—
1945–46	Indianapolis Capitals	AHL	5	0	2	2	2	—	—	—	—	—
1945–46	Omaha Knights	USHL	54	29	38	67	33	7	3	1	4	7
1946–47	Omaha Knights	USHL	56	15	21	36	20	11	8	7	15	0
1947–48	Omaha Knights	USHL	38	19	34	53	2	3	1	0	1	0
1948–49	Omaha Knights	USHL	61	11	33	44	36	4	0	0	0	0
USHL totals			209	74	126	200	91	25	12	8	20	7
NHL totals			7	1	1	2	2	—	—	—	—	—

== Awards and achievements ==
- Harry F. Sinclair Trophy winner (AHA Champion) – St. Louis Flyers (1940–41)
- Calder Cup winner (AHL Champion) – Buffalo Bisons (1942–43)
- USHL First All-Star Team (1946)
