= Tom O'Neill (ice hockey) =

Canadian ice hockey player

Thomas O'Neill
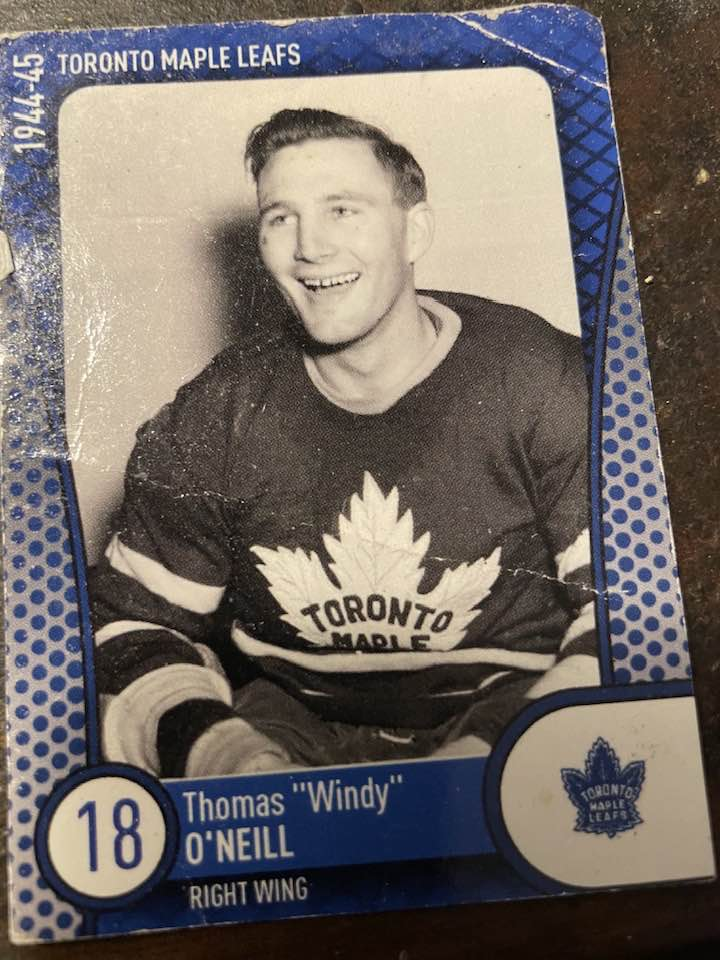
- Thomas "Windy" Bernard O'Neill NHL Hockey Card: Toronto Maple Leafs (1944-45)
- Born: September 28, 1923 Deseronto, Ontario, Canada
- Died: February 13, 1973 (aged 49) Toronto, Ontario, Canada
- Height: 5 ft 10 in (178 cm)
- Weight: 155 lb (70 kg; 11 st 1 lb)
- Position: Right wing
- Shot: Right
- Played for: Toronto Maple Leafs
- Playing career: 1942–1949

Thomas Bernard "Windy" O'Neill (September 28, 1923 – February 13, 1973) was a Canadian professional ice hockey player, and later lawyer, who played 66 games in the National Hockey League with the Toronto Maple Leafs, winning the Stanley Cup with Toronto in 1945.

== Early life ==
Thomas Bernard O'Neill was born on September 28th, 1923 in Deseronto, Ontario to second-generation Irish-Canadian parents James Henry 'Emmett' O'Neill and Mary Anna Maloney. He was the oldest of 8 siblings.

== Nickname origin ==
The nickname, 'Windy' originates from O'Neill's time in the early 1940s at University of St. Michael's College where O'Neill was studying law. O'Neill was in the middle of a long-winded debate with a priest (professor) when he was interrupted with, "Why don't you sit down, Windy?"

Known for his boisterous personality and enjoyment of long-winded discussions, the nickname stuck.

== NHL career ==
During WW2, many NHL players enlisted or volunteered to aid the war effort. Due to the shortage of professional players available for the Maple Leafs, O'Neill, playing university hockey for the St. Michael's Majors attended the Maple Leafs training camp in late October 1943. Despite his efforts, O'Neill's strongest impression was made off-ice with his "boogie-woogie" piano performance, landing him a spot on the 1943-1944 Toronto Maple Leafs roster.

The general manager of the Toronto Maple Leafs at the time, Conn Smythe commended O'Neill, not for his hockey skills, but his piano-playing abilities, citing him as the "greatest player in the NHL—the greatest piano player that is..."

O'Neill eventually became a journeyman, playing mainly as a right winger and enforcer for the Toronto Maple Leafs during the 1943-44 and 1944-45 seasons. O'Neill played a defensive style of hockey and was known to shut-down big name players including the likes of Maurice "Rocket" Richard. The widely-revered Maple Leafs coach Hap Day once ordered O'Neill to "never cross the blue-line", a warning given to him after he had entirely missed the net on a breakaway chance, leading Bill Mosienko of the Chicago Blackhawks to retrieve the puck, skating the length of the ice and scoring.

In the 1943-44 season, O'Neill played 33 regular season games and 4 playoff games. The Maple Leafs would be eliminated in the NHL Semi-Finals 4–1 to the Montreal Canadiens.

In the 1944-45 season, O'Neill played 33 regular season games, but did not play in the playoffs. The Maple Leafs would go on to defeat the Detroit Red Wings in game 7 of the Stanley Cup Final.

== Post-NHL life ==
Although O'Neill had played enough regular season games in the 1944-45 season to have his name engraved on the Stanley Cup, the Maple Leafs management short-changed O'Neill, preventing him from receiving any playoff memorabilia. This act by the Leafs management, coupled with the NHL stars returning from the war prompted O'Neill to leave the NHL and continue to pursue his law studies.

Sometime after Spring of 1945, O'Neill's father secured a position as a manager for a corset manufacturer in Quebec City, Quebec. Soon-after, O'Neill moved to Quebec and began working as a corset-fitter under his father. O'Neill then attended Université Laval, began learning French and joined the amateur hockey club, the Quebec Aces. Whilst playing for the Quebec Aces, O'Neill would developed a close friendship with Punch Imlach, the infamous future coach of the Toronto Maple Leafs, who at the time was a player-coach for the Quebec Aces.

In 1946, O'Neill moved to Halifax, Nova Scotia to attend Dalhousie University. O'Neill funded his education by playing for the semi-pro hockey club, the Halifax Crescents. Close friend and writer, Scott Young, would later depict a story told by Punch Imlach describing O’Neill’s move to Halifax. Taking just one briefcase containing newspaper clippings relating to O'Neill's NHL career, O'Neill planned to use the clippings to secure a spot on a professional hockey team, in which he ultimately succeeded.

Additionally, O'Neill would go on to be monumental in forming the university's first Canadian football team, although opposed by the English Rugby supporters in The Maritimes who dubbed O'Neill, the "saboteur from Upper Canada."

In late 1950, O'Neill would graduate from Dalhousie University and be admitted to the bar of Nova Scotia. On November 7th, 1950, O'Neill married Miriam Winnifred Jamieson. The wedding was held at St. Thomas Aquinas and later the reception at Lord Nelson hotel, both located in Halifax, Nova Scotia.

After the wedding, the couple would fly into Toronto where they would settle and eventually have 5 children together-Thomas Jr., Gregory, Emmett, Chris, and Constance (Connie).

In January of 1951, O'Neill would be one of five lawyers admitted to the bar in Ontario.

In 1958, O'Neill unsuccessfully contested the 1958 Canadian federal election for the Liberal Party in the Toronto area district of Rosedale.

In 1964 O'Neill and Miriam would divorce.

In February of 1971 O'Neill was involved in an unfortunate circumstance relating to the Conservative convention election. The Conservative Party decided to modernize the voting system to delegate leadership rather than use the conventional ballots. 15 voting machines, supplied by O'Neill through a franchise connection in the United States, failed, thus resulting in erroneous tallies for the six candidates. Alan Eagleson, then Ontario's Conservative President, brought order to chaos by throwing out the machine vote and starting a battery of duplicators cranking out paper ballots. On New Years Eve of 1972, the Ontario government announced the Queen's Counsel honour for O'Neill, forgiving the inadvertent polling mishap.

== Death ==
On February 13th, 1973, O'Neill was dining with his secretary, Scott Young, and Young's wife, at The Dell Restaurant and Tavern, a local tavern in York, Ontario. Just before 8pm, O'Neill suffered a sudden heart-attack, dropping his knife and collapsing at the table. O'Neill was rushed to Mount Sinai Hospital where just hours later he was pronounced dead at 49 years old. O'Neill's cause of death was Myocardial infarction [heart-attack] as he suffered multiple cardiac-arrests leading to a worsened condition throughout the evening.

== Windy O'Neill's Irish Pub ==
In the mid to late 1980's, following O'Neill's death, O'Neill's younger brother Paul Francis O'Neill opened a chain of pubs amply named 'Windy O'Neill's Irish Pub', a tribute to his late brother. The pub held three locations, one in Vaughan, Ontario, one in Whitby, Ontario, and one in the Blue Mountain Village Resort in The Blue Mountains, Ontario, now the current location of 'MJ Byrne's Irish Pub.' Since the passing of Paul O'Neill in 2024, there are no pubs currently operating under the name 'Windy O'Neill's Irish Pub.'

== Career statistics ==
=== Regular season and playoffs ===
			Regular season					Playoffs
Season	Team	League	GP	G	A	Pts	PIM	GP	G	A	Pts	PIM
1940–41	St. Michael's Buzzers	OHA-B	6	1	3	4	0	2	0	3	3	0
1941–42	St. Michael's Majors	OHA	18	6	6	12	28	2	0	0	0	0
1942–43	St. Michael's Majors	OHA	16	5	9	14	34	5	3	3	6	4
1942–43	Toronto Tip Tops	TIHL	6	1	6	7	2	—	—	—	—	—
1943–44	Toronto Maple Leafs	NHL	33	8	7	15	29	4	0	0	0	6
1944–45	Toronto Maple Leafs	NHL	33	2	3	5	24	—	—	—	—	—
1945–46	Quebec Aces	QSHL	39	6	14	20	33	5	0	1	1	0
1946–47	Halifax Crescents	MSHL	32	25	21	46	49	4	0	0	0	0
1947–48	Halifax Crescents	MSHL	26	14	16	30	36	4	0	4	4	0
1948–49	Halifax St. Mary's	MSHL	22	4	2	6	18	5	0	0	0	6
1948–49	Halifax St. Mary's	Al-Cup	—	—	—	—	—	2	0	0	0	4
NHL totals			66	10	12	22	53	4	0	0	0	6
