= Bob Wood (ice hockey) =

Canadian ice hockey player

- Born: July 9, 1930 Lethbridge, Alberta, Canada
- Died: November 11, 2007 (aged 77) Red Deer, Alberta, Canada
- Height: 6 ft 1 in (185 cm)
- Weight: 185 lb (84 kg; 13 st 3 lb)
- Position: Defence
- Shot: Left
- Played for: New York Rangers
- Playing career: 1946–1957

Robert Owen Wood (July 9, 1930 – November 11, 2007) was a Canadian professional ice hockey defenceman who played in one National Hockey League game for the New York Rangers during the 1950–51. He played on March 25, 1951, against the Chicago Black Hawks. Wood later played two seasons in Great Britain.

== Career statistics ==
=== Regular season and playoffs ===
| | | | Regular season | | | | | Playoffs |
| Season | Team | League | GP | G | A | Pts | PIM | GP | G | A | Pts | PIM |
|---|---|---|---|---|---|---|---|---|---|---|---|---|
| 1946–47 | Lethbridge Native Sons | AJHL | 1 | 0 | 1 | 1 | 8 | — | — | — | — | — |
| 1946–47 | St. Catharines Falcons | OHA | 39 | 7 | 15 | 22 | 74 | — | — | — | — | — |
| 1947–48 | Lethbridge Native Sons | AJHL | 22 | 5 | 9 | 14 | 26 | 6 | 0 | 0 | 0 | 2 |
| 1948–49 | Lethbridge Native Sons | WCJHL | 25 | 1 | 7 | 8 | 48 | 6 | 0 | 3 | 3 | 14 |
| 1949–50 | Lethbridge Native Sons | WCJHL | 37 | 3 | 24 | 27 | 56 | — | — | — | — | — |
| 1950–51 | New York Rangers | NHL | 1 | 0 | 0 | 0 | 0 | — | — | — | — | — |
| 1950–51 | New York Rovers | EHL | 53 | 3 | 4 | 7 | 77 | 5 | 0 | 0 | 0 | 14 |
| 1955–56 | Brighton Tigers | BNL | 44 | 8 | 13 | 21 | 30 | — | — | — | — | — |
| 1956–57 | Brighton Tigers | BNL | — | — | — | — | — | — | — | — | — | — |
| NHL totals | | | 1 | 0 | 0 | 0 | 0 | — | — | — | — | — |

== See also ==
- List of players who played only one game in the NHL
