= Ray Frederick =

Canadian ice hockey player

- Born: July 31, 1929 Fort Frances, Ontario, Canada
- Died: August 23, 2001 (aged 72) Sudbury, Ontario, Canada
- Height: 6 ft 0 in (183 cm)
- Weight: 154 lb (70 kg; 11 st 0 lb)
- Position: Goaltender
- Caught: Left
- Played for: Chicago Black Hawks
- Playing career: 1943–1959

Roman Raymond Frederick (July 31, 1929 – August 23, 2001) was a Canadian professional ice hockey goaltender who played five games in the National Hockey League with the Chicago Black Hawks during the 1954–55 season. The rest of his career, which lasted from 1943 to 1959, was spent in the minor leagues. Frederick was born in Fort Frances, Ontario, but grew up in Ottawa, Ontario.

== Career statistics ==
=== Regular season and playoffs ===
			Regular season								Playoffs
Season	Team	League	GP	W	L	T	Min	GA	SO	GAA	GP	W	L	T	Min	GA	SO	GAA
1943–44	Fort Francis Maple Leafs	TBSHL	—	—	—	—	—	—	—	—	—	—	—	—	—	—	—	—
1943–44	Fort Francis Maple Leafs	Al-Cup	—	—	—	—	—	—	—	—	2	0	2	0	120	23	0	11.50
1944–45	Port Arthur Bruins	TBJHL	—	—	—	—	—	—	—	—	—	—	—	—	—	—	—	—
1944–45	Fort Francis West Enders	TBSHL	5	—	—	—	270	41	0	9.11	—	—	—	—	—	—	—	—
1945–46	Hamilton Lloyds	OHA	12	—	—	—	720	94	0	7.83	—	—	—	—	—	—	—	—
1946–47	Fort Francis Canadians	TBSHL	—	—	—	—	—	—	—	—	—	—	—	—	—	—	—	—
1946–47	Fort Francis Canadians	Al-Cup	—	—	—	—	—	—	—	—	4	1	3	0	240	18	0	4.50
1947–48	Brandon Wheat Kings	MJHL	24	15	9	0	1460	99	2	4.07	5	1	3	1	310	29	0	5.00
1948–49	Brandon Wheat Kings	MJHL	30	27	3	0	1800	78	2	2.60	7	4	2	1	440	23	1	3.14
1948–49	Brandon Wheat Kings	M-Cup	—	—	—	—	—	—	—	—	18	11	6	1	1090	49	1	2.70
1949–50	Edmonton Flyers	WCSHL	47	—	—	—	2820	159	0	3.38	6	2	4	—	360	23	0	3.83
1950–51	Edmonton Flyers	WCSHL	60	—	—	—	3600	198	2	3.30	8	—	—	—	480	27	1	3.37
1951–52	Chicoutimi Sagueneens	QSHL	14	5	6	3	870	40	0	2.76	—	—	—	—	—	—	—	—
1951–52	Charlottetown Islanders	MMHL	54	26	22	6	3216	193	2	3.60	4	0	4	—	264	15	0	3.41
1952–53	Ottawa Senators	QSHL	60	27	26	7	3720	191	5	3.08	11	5	6	—	726	33	1	2.73
1953–54	Ottawa Senators	QSHL	60	28	27	5	3656	172	9	2.82	22	12	10	—	1364	48	0	2.11
1954–55	Chicago Black Hawks	NHL	5	0	4	1	300	22	0	4.40	—	—	—	—	—	—	—	—
1954–55	Buffalo Bisons	AHL	22	15	7	0	1320	83	0	3.77	10	5	5	—	639	32	1	3.00
1954–55	Ottawa Senators	QSHL	27	10	17	0	1626	90	1	3.32	—	—	—	—	—	—	—	—
1955–56	Calgary Stampeders	WHL	60	34	26	0	3627	203	6	3.36	8	4	4	—	505	35	0	4.16
1956–57	Chicoutimi Sagueneens	QSHL	64	32	28	4	3886	190	4	2.93	10	6	4	—	605	26	1	2.59
1957–58	Cornwall Chevies	OHA Sr	38	—	—	—	2280	180	1	4.74	7	—	—	—	420	23	1	3.28
1958–59	Sudbury Wolves	OHA Sr	53	—	—	—	3180	207	1	3.91	5	—	—	—	300	19	0	3.80
NHL totals			5	0	4	1	300	22	0	4.40	—	—	—	—	—	—	—	—
