= Matt Ellis (ice hockey) =

Canadian ice hockey player (born 1981)

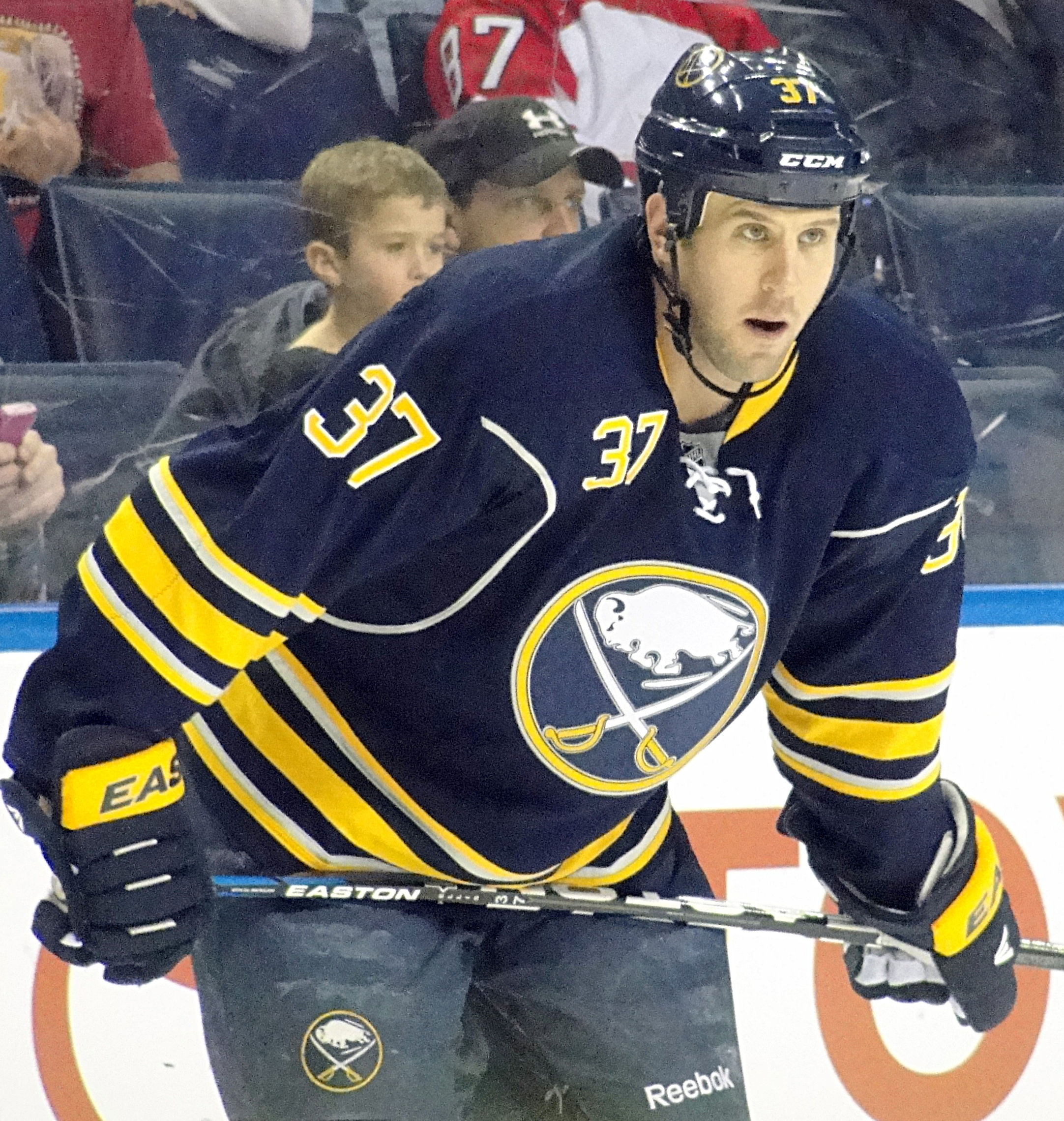
- Ellis with the Sabres in 2012.
- Born: August 31, 1981 (age 44) Welland, Ontario, Canada
- Height: 6 ft 1 in (185 cm)
- Weight: 205 lb (93 kg; 14 st 9 lb)
- Position: Left wing
- Shot: Left
- Played for: Detroit Red Wings; Los Angeles Kings; Buffalo Sabres
- NHL draft: Undrafted
- Playing career: 2003–2016

Matt Ellis (born August 31, 1981) is a Canadian former professional ice hockey left winger and assistant coach for the Buffalo Sabres of the National Hockey League. Not selected in an NHL entry draft, Ellis has also played in the NHL for the Detroit Red Wings, Los Angeles Kings and the Sabres.

== Playing career ==
=== Amateur ===
Ellis began his major junior hockey career in the Ontario Hockey League (OHL) with the Toronto St. Michael's Majors in 1998. Each subsequent season with the Majors saw Ellis improve his point totals, from 18 the first year, onto 35, 45, and finishing with 38 goals and 51 assists for 89 total points in his final year with Toronto, helping them with the Central Division title.

=== Professional ===
As a result of his OHL performances, the Detroit Red Wings signed the undrafted Ellis as a free agent on May 10, 2002. He was then sent to play on the Red Wings' ECHL affiliate, the Toledo Storm, where he posted 59 points in the regular season and tacked on eight points in the Storm's short playoff run.

In the following season, 2003–04, Ellis was called up to the American Hockey League (AHL) to join the Red Wings' top-level affiliate, the Grand Rapids Griffins; he recorded his first AHL point on October 24, 2003, with an assist on the game-winning goal against the Utah Grizzlies. Ellis again took time to adjust to the faster pace of the AHL, but soon found his place with the team. Each season saw his point totals increasing, and in 2005–06, he was named team captain, the youngest-ever in Griffins' history. On earning the captaincy and his confidence level, Ellis stated:

"It's definitely a big factor. You can totally tell the difference when there's a guy out there playing with confidence and when a guy's unsure of himself. Being a fourth-year pro, it makes a huge difference. Each year, you come in with a little more confidence, and I’ve been fortunate enough to be surrounded by some great players and coaches who were there to give me a pat on the back or help me out and keep me motivated."

When asked about the chance to play for the Red Wings, Ellis then said:

"I’m hoping. Grand Rapids is a great place to learn and develop, but I’d like to get my feet wet in Detroit – for sure."

Ellis made his NHL debut for the Red Wings on December 18, 2006, in a 4–3 loss to the Columbus Blue Jackets.

Nearly two years later, on February 21, 2008, Ellis was claimed off of waivers by the Los Angeles Kings. He scored his first goal with the Kings, an empty-netter, on March 13, against the Nashville Predators at Sommet Center in Nashville, Tennessee.

Shortly before the commencement of the 2008–09 season, on October 1, 2008, Ellis was claimed off of waivers from the Kings by the Buffalo Sabres. He played his first game with the latter on October 15 against the New York Rangers. On December 18, after injuries to several Buffalo forwards, Ellis was recalled from Buffalo's then-AHL affiliate, the Portland Pirates, for the second time that season. In the subsequent off-season, on July 9, 2009, he resigned with the Sabres on a one-year contract.

On August 31, 2010, Ellis was re-signed to an additional one-year contract with Buffalo. To begin the following 2010–11 season, the Sabres placed Ellis on waivers, which he cleared on October 4, 2010. On July 19, 2011, in the off-season, Ellis signed a multi-year contract extension with the Sabres.

During the lockout-shortened 2012–13 season, Ellis was again waived and was sent to the AHL's Rochester Americans after six games played with Buffalo. After 12 points in 35 games with the Americans, Ellis opted to remain with the Sabres organization, signing a two-year, two-way contract extension on July 3, 2013.

In the 2014–15 season, Ellis was recalled to the Sabres during the midpoint of the season, and on April 1, 2015, he scored his first goal of the campaign in a Buffalo victory over the Toronto Maple Leafs.

On July 9, 2015, Ellis signed a one-year contract with the Rochester Americans. Ellis announced his retirement at the end of the season. He immediately joined The Academy of Hockey, which like the Sabres and Americans is owned by Terrence Pegula, as a coach.

== Career statistics ==
			Regular season					Playoffs
Season	Team	League	GP	G	A	Pts	PIM	GP	G	A	Pts	PIM
1998–99	Toronto St. Michael's Majors	OHL	47	10	8	18	6	—	—	—	—	—
1999–00	Toronto St. Michael's Majors	OHL	59	15	20	35	20	—	—	—	—	—
2000–01	Toronto St. Michael's Majors	OHL	68	21	24	45	19	18	4	8	12	6
2001–02	Toronto St. Michael's Majors	OHL	66	38	51	89	20	15	8	6	14	6
2002–03	Toledo Storm	ECHL	71	27	32	59	34	7	3	5	8	0
2003–04	Grand Rapids Griffins	AHL	64	5	10	15	23	4	0	0	0	2
2004–05	Grand Rapids Griffins	AHL	79	18	23	41	59	—	—	—	—	—
2005–06	Grand Rapids Griffins	AHL	74	20	28	48	61	16	4	1	5	20
2006–07	Grand Rapids Griffins	AHL	65	26	23	49	44	7	4	3	7	4
2006–07	Detroit Red Wings	NHL	16	0	0	0	6	—	—	—	—	—
2007–08	Detroit Red Wings	NHL	35	2	4	6	12	—	—	—	—	—
2007–08	Los Angeles Kings	NHL	19	1	1	2	14	—	—	—	—	—
2008–09	Buffalo Sabres	NHL	45	7	5	12	12	—	—	—	—	—
2008–09	Portland Pirates	AHL	12	2	2	4	4	—	—	—	—	—
2009–10	Buffalo Sabres	NHL	72	3	10	13	12	3	1	0	1	0
2010–11	Portland Pirates	AHL	52	10	21	31	12	11	1	5	6	4
2010–11	Buffalo Sabres	NHL	14	0	0	0	0	1	0	0	0	0
2011–12	Buffalo Sabres	NHL	60	3	5	8	25	—	—	—	—	—
2012–13	Buffalo Sabres	NHL	6	0	0	0	0	—	—	—	—	—
2012–13	Rochester Americans	AHL	32	5	7	12	6	3	0	0	0	2
2013–14	Rochester Americans	AHL	25	5	5	10	10	—	—	—	—	—
2013–14	Buffalo Sabres	NHL	50	4	2	6	4	—	—	—	—	—
2014–15	Rochester Americans	AHL	38	7	6	13	2	—	—	—	—	—
2014–15	Buffalo Sabres	NHL	39	1	1	2	4	—	—	—	—	—
2015–16	Rochester Americans	AHL	58	6	6	12	6	—	—	—	—	—
NHL totals			356	21	28	49	89	4	1	0	1	0

== Awards and achievements ==
- 2004–05: Matched a Grand Rapids Griffins record with four short-handed goals, giving him the nickname "shorty";
- 2004–05: First player in Griffins history to score two shorthanded goals in a home game. (March 12, 2005 vs. Hamilton Bulldogs);
- 2005–06: Named youngest captain in Grand Rapids Griffins' history.
