= Fred Hunt (ice hockey) =

Canadian ice hockey player (1917–1977)

- Born: January 17, 1917 Brantford, Ontario, Canada
- Died: October 4, 1977 (aged 60) Buffalo, New York, United States
- Height: 5 ft 8 in (173 cm)
- Weight: 160 lb (73 kg; 11 st 6 lb)
- Position: Right wing
- Shot: Right
- Played for: New York Rangers; New York Americans
- Playing career: 1937–1949

Frederick Tennyson Hunt (January 17, 1917 in Brantford, Ontario — October 4, 1977) was a Canadian professional ice hockey winger who played 59 games in the National Hockey League (NHL) with the New York Rangers and New York Americans between 1940 and 1945. The rest of his career, which lasted from 1937 to 1949, was mainly spent in the American Hockey League (AHL). In 1952 Hunt became coach of the AHL's Buffalo Bisons, who he had played for, and served in that role on three separate times over the next 18 years; in 1953 he was also named general manager of the Bisons, holding that position until 1970. He helped the Buffalo Sabres join the NHL as an expansion team in 1970, serving as assistant general manager of the team.

He died on October 4, 1977 in Buffalo, New York. In 1977 the AHL introduced the Fred T. Hunt Memorial Award, for the player best exemplifying sportsmanship, determination, and dedication to hockey.

== Career statistics ==
=== Regular season and playoffs ===
			Regular season					Playoffs
Season	Team	League	GP	G	A	Pts	PIM	GP	G	A	Pts	PIM
1933–34	Brantford Lions	OHA	16	5	3	8	14	—	—	—	—	—
1934–35	Brantford Lions	OHA	17	4	1	5	12	—	—	—	—	—
1935–36	Toronto St. Michael's Majors	OHA	9	2	9	11	12	4	1	1	2	11
1936–37	Toronto St. Michael's Majors	OHA	12	5	5	10	16	6	5	3	8	19
1936–37	Toronto St. Michael's Majors	M-Cup	—	—	—	—	—	7	5	4	9	0
1937–38	Hershey Bears	EAHL	57	10	14	24	45	—	—	—	—	—
1938–39	Hershey Cubs	EAHL	53	22	32	54	20	—	—	—	—	—
1939–40	Baltimore Orioles	EAHL	59	31	37	68	52	8	2	5	7	2
1940–41	New York Americans	NHL	15	2	5	7	0	—	—	—	—	—
1940–41	Springfield Indians	AHL	40	17	27	44	38	3	0	1	1	2
1941–42	Springfield Indians	AHL	51	19	21	40	45	2	0	0	0	0
1942–43	Buffalo Bisons	AHL	50	27	30	57	52	9	5	3	8	2
1943–44	Buffalo Bisons	AHL	52	27	53	80	39	9	5	11	16	0
1944–45	New York Rangers	NHL	44	13	9	22	6	—	—	—	—	—
1945–46	Buffalo Bisons	AHL	62	27	43	70	32	12	5	11	16	6
1946–47	Buffalo Bisons	AHL	63	26	21	47	29	2	0	1	1	0
1947–48	Buffalo Bisons	AHL	40	12	20	32	0	8	4	3	7	4
1948–49	Buffalo Bisons	AHL	48	12	26	38	6	—	—	—	—	—
1948–49	Hershey Bears	AHL	13	7	2	9	5	9	3	2	5	0
AHL totals			419	174	243	417	246	54	22	32	54	14
NHL totals			59	15	14	29	6	—	—	—	—	—
