= Armand Delmonte =

Canadian ice hockey player

- Born: June 3, 1927 Timmins, Ontario, Canada
- Died: April 7, 1981 (aged 53) North Oaks, Minnesota, U.S.
- Height: 5 ft 10 in (178 cm)
- Weight: 170 lb (77 kg; 12 st 2 lb)
- Position: Right wing
- Shot: Right
- Played for: Boston Bruins
- Playing career: 1945–1954

Armand Romeo "Dutch" Delmonte (June 3, 1927 – April 7, 1981) was a Canadian professional ice hockey right winger who played in one National Hockey League game for the Boston Bruins during the 1945–46 season, on January 6, 1946, against the New York Rangers.

Del Monte also played for the St. Catharines Falcons from 1943 to 1945, Boston Olympics from 1945 to 1948, Los Angeles Monarchs from 1946 to 1947, St. Paul Saints from 1947 to 1951, Tacoma Rockets from 1951 to 1952, Cleveland Barons from 1952 to 1953, Ottawa Senators from 1953 to 1954, and the Marion Barons from 1953 to 1954.

== Career statistics ==
=== Regular season and playoffs ===
			Regular season					Playoffs
Season	Team	League	GP	G	A	Pts	PIM	GP	G	A	Pts	PIM
1943–44	St. Catharines Falcons	OHA	23	8	4	12	32	6	4	0	4	4
1944–45	St. Catharines Falcons	OHA	21	17	14	31	36	5	2	2	4	4
1945–46	Boston Bruins	NHL	1	0	0	0	0	—	—	—	—	—
1945–46	Boston Olympics	EAHL	46	30	20	50	58	12	2	3	5	15
1946–47	Boston Olympics	EAHL	56	26	15	41	71	9	4	2	6	11
1946–47	Los Angeles Monarchs	PCHL	—	—	—	—	—	7	0	6	6	0
1947–48	St. Paul Saints	USHL	43	4	6	10	26	—	—	—	—	—
1948–49	St. Paul Saints	USHL	66	33	39	72	64	7	5	2	7	2
1949–50	St. Paul Saints	USHL	69	18	36	54	37	3	0	1	1	0
1950–51	St. Paul Saints	USHL	57	25	26	51	54	—	—	—	—	—
1951–52	Tacoma Rockets	PCHL	62	20	26	46	64	7	2	6	8	4
1952–53	Cleveland Barons	AHL	33	7	6	13	45	—	—	—	—	—
1953–54	Ottawa Senators	QHL	8	1	0	1	4	—	—	—	—	—
1953–54	Marion Barons	IHL	48	30	35	65	87	5	0	4	4	10
USHL totals			235	80	107	187	181	10	5	3	8	2
NHL totals			1	0	0	0	0	—	—	—	—	—

== See also ==
- List of players who played only one game in the NHL
