= Bob DeCourcy =

Canadian ice hockey player (1927–2012)

- Born: June 12, 1927 Toronto, Ontario, Canada
- Died: March 25, 2012 (aged 84) Alliston, Ontario, Canada
- Height: 5 ft 11 in (180 cm)
- Weight: 160 lb (73 kg; 11 st 6 lb)
- Position: Goaltender
- Caught: Right
- Played for: New York Rangers
- Playing career: 1947–1951

Robert Phillip DeCourcy (June 12, 1927 – March 25, 2012) was a Canadian professional ice hockey goaltender who played in one National Hockey League game for the New York Rangers during the 1947–48 season. He died in Alliston, Ontario, on March 25, 2012, at the age of 84.

== Playing career ==
DeCourcy played with the New York Rovers of the Eastern Hockey League. His lone NHL game came on November 12, 1947 against the Boston Bruins. He replaced regular Rangers goalie Chuck Rayner and played 29 minutes, giving up six goals.

== Career statistics ==
=== Regular season and playoffs ===
			Regular season								Playoffs
Season	Team	League	GP	W	L	T	Min	GA	SO	GAA	GP	W	L	T	Min	GA	SO	GAA
1943–44	St. Michael's Majors U18	OHA U18	10	10	0	0	600	3	0	0.30	—	—	—	—	—	—	—	—
1944–45	St. Michael's Buzzers	OHA-B	6	6	0	0	360	16	0	2.67	—	—	—	—	—	—	—	—
1945–46	St. Michael's Majors	OHA	1	0	0	0	20	0	0	0.00	—	—	—	—	—	—	—	—
1946–47	Hamilton Szabos	OHA	20	—	—	—	1200	176	0	8.80	—	—	—	—	—	—	—	—
1946–47	New York Rovers	EAHL	2	0	2	0	120	9	0	4.50	—	—	—	—	—	—	—	—
1947–48	New York Rangers	NHL	1	0	1	0	30	6	0	12.29	—	—	—	—	—	—	—	—
1947–48	New York Rovers	QSHL	10	—	—	—	600	55	0	5.50	—	—	—	—	—	—	—	—
1947–48	New York Rovers	EAHL	14	—	—	—	840	92	0	6.57	—	—	—	—	—	—	—	—
1947–48	St. Paul Saints	USHL	8	—	—	—	480	21	2	2.62	—	—	—	—	—	—	—	—
1948–49	Kansas City Pla-Mors	USHL	2	0	1	1	120	6	0	3.00	—	—	—	—	—	—	—	—
1948–49	Omaha Knights	USHL	9	3	5	1	540	32	0	3.56	—	—	—	—	—	—	—	—
1949–50	St. Paul Saints	USHL	13	3	10	0	780	69	0	5.30	—	—	—	—	—	—	—	—
1950–51	St. Michael's Monarchs	OHA Sr	1	—	—	—	60	5	0	5.00	—	—	—	—	—	—	—	—
NHL totals			1	0	1	0	30	6	0	12.29	—	—	—	—	—	—	—	—

== See also ==
- List of players who played only one game in the NHL
