= Walt Atanas =

Canadian ice hockey player

- Born: December 22, 1922; Hamilton, Ontario, Canada
- Died: August 8, 1991 (aged 68)
- Height: 5 ft 8 in (173 cm)
- Weight: 174 lb (79 kg; 12 st 6 lb)
- Position: Right wing
- Shot: Right
- Played for: New York Rangers
- National team: Canada
- Playing career: 1943–1957

Walter "Ants" Atanas (December 22, 1922 – August 8, 1991) was a Canadian ice hockey right winger. He played for the New York Rangers during the 1944-45 season, appearing in 49 games totaling 21 points. Much of his career, which lasted from 1943 to 1957, was spent in the minor leagues, in particular the American Hockey League and the United States Hockey League.

He worked as a scout for the Philadelphia Flyers from 1972 until he died in 1991.

== Career statistics ==
=== Regular season and playoffs ===
| | | | Regular season | | | | | Playoffs |
| Season | Team | League | GP | G | A | Pts | PIM | GP | G | A | Pts | PIM |
|---|---|---|---|---|---|---|---|---|---|---|---|---|
| 1942–43 | Hamilton Whizzers | OHA | 23 | 37 | 12 | 49 | 21 | 5 | 1 | 1 | 2 | 10 |
| 1943–44 | Buffalo Bisons | AHL | 46 | 16 | 19 | 35 | 33 | 9 | 6 | 7 | 13 | 2 |
| 1943–44 | Toronto Maher Jewels | TIHL | 1 | 2 | 0 | 2 | 0 | — | — | — | — | — |
| 1944–45 | New York Rangers | NHL | 49 | 13 | 8 | 21 | 40 | — | — | — | — | — |
| 1944–45 | Toronto Maher Jewels | TIHL | 1 | 2 | 0 | 2 | 0 | — | — | — | — | — |
| 1945–46 | Cleveland Barons | AHL | 31 | 10 | 10 | 20 | 30 | — | — | — | — | — |
| 1945–46 | Minneapolis Millers | USHL | 22 | 11 | 10 | 21 | 26 | — | — | — | — | — |
| 1946–47 | Minneapolis Millers | USHL | 51 | 10 | 19 | 29 | 40 | 3 | 1 | 0 | 1 | 14 |
| 1947–48 | Minneapolis Millers | USHL | 66 | 25 | 38 | 63 | 59 | 10 | 6 | 2 | 8 | 8 |
| 1948–49 | Minneapolis Millers | USHL | 64 | 35 | 20 | 55 | 15 | — | — | — | — | — |
| 1949–50 | Minneapolis Millers | USHL | 69 | 24 | 28 | 52 | 49 | 7 | 7 | 4 | 11 | 10 |
| 1950–51 | Buffalo Bisons | AHL | 61 | 19 | 26 | 45 | 23 | 4 | 0 | 0 | 0 | 8 |
| 1951–52 | Victoria Cougars | PCHL | 36 | 21 | 8 | 29 | 32 | 13 | 3 | 6 | 9 | 11 |
| 1951–52 | Buffalo Bisons | AHL | 11 | 2 | 2 | 4 | 4 | — | — | — | — | — |
| 1952–53 | Vancouver Canucks | WHL | 68 | 28 | 24 | 52 | 28 | 9 | 1 | 1 | 2 | 14 |
| 1953–54 | Syracuse Warriors | AHL | 28 | 9 | 19 | 28 | 14 | — | — | — | — | — |
| 1953–54 | Springfield Indians | QHL | 18 | 7 | 15 | 22 | 24 | — | — | — | — | — |
| 1954–55 | Springfield Indians | AHL | 62 | 29 | 45 | 74 | 66 | 4 | 0 | 1 | 1 | 2 |
| 1955–56 | Springfield Indians | AHL | 56 | 24 | 28 | 49 | — | — | — | — | — |
| 1956–57 | North Bay Trappers | NOHA | 52 | 15 | 31 | 46 | 35 | — | — | — | — | — |
| USHL totals | | | 272 | 105 | 115 | 220 | 189 | 20 | 14 | 6 | 20 | 32 |
| AHL totals | | | 295 | 109 | 119 | 258 | 219 | 17 | 6 | 8 | 14 | 12 |
| NHL totals | | | 49 | 13 | 8 | 21 | 40 | — | — | — | — | — |
