= Hamilton Whizzers =

Canadian junior ice hockey team (1941–1947)

- City: Hamilton, Ontario
- League: Ontario Hockey Association
- Operated: 1941–1947
- Home arena: Barton Street Arena

Franchise history
- 1941–1944: Hamilton Whizzers
- 1944: Hamilton Barons
- 1945–46: Hamilton Lloyds
- 1946–47: Hamilton Szabos

The Hamilton Whizzers were a Canadian junior ice hockey team in the Ontario Hockey Association (OHA), and based at the Barton Street Arena in Hamilton, Ontario. Playing three seasons known as the Whizzers, subsequent team names included the Hamilton Barons in the 1944–45 season, the Hamilton Lloyds in the 1945–46 season, and the Hamilton Szabos in the 1946–47 season.

== History ==
The Hamilton Whizzers began as an Ontario Hockey Association (OHA) junior B team known as the "G. and M.'s" early in the 1941–42 season. The team was managed by Lou Pelissier who relocated to Hamilton after coaching in Western Canada. Sponsored by Mssrs. Wilkinson and Grisenthwaite, the Whizzers played home games at the Barton Street Arena. In their first season, the Whizzers lost in the playoffs to the St. Michael's Buzzers.

Whizzers' coach Hughie McLean suggested moving the team up to the junior A level for the 1942–43 OHA season. McLean and Pelissier secured approval from the arena manager Percy Thompson to support a junior A team, and were promoted by the OHA along with the Stratford Kroehlers in 1942. Pelissier attempted to sign Howie Meeker and Bill Cupolo, although both players remained in Stratford when they were also promoted to junior A. The Whizzers finished the season second place in the OHA, then lost 4-games-to-1 versus the Oshawa Generals in the playoffs semifinal.

The Hamilton Whizzers were sponsored by Bill Grisenthwaite and Jimmy Kemp in the 1943–44 OHA season. Placing third in Group 1 during the regular season, Hamilton defeated the Brantford Lions 2-games-to-1 in the quarterfinal, then defeated the Toronto Navy junior B team in consecutive games in a challenge series, and lost the playoffs semifinal in three games to the Toronto St. Michael's Majors. Following the playoffs, the Whizzers lost all but three of their players to World War II military service.

Seeking new players, Hamilton agreed with sports promoter Albert C. Sutphin, for the Whizzers to become a farm team for the Cleveland Barons of the American Hockey League. The Whizzers were renamed the Hamilton Barons, and sought imported players who spent the previous season in the United States, pending approval of transfer requests. The Barons were coached and managed by Louis Pelissier, and were placed in a group with the Galt Red Wings, Port Colborne Recreationists, and the St. Catharines Falcons.

Playing Galt in the first game of the season, Hamilton used Ian MacIntosh and Edward Marchant despite that their transfers were not approved, and lost by an 8–1 score. The Barons withdrew from the OHA, stating that they were unable to form a team of sufficient quality when the Manitoba Amateur Hockey Association refused to grant transfers to the OHA. The Barons' game on November 18, 1944, was also the only game played by Gordie Howe in the OHA, whose goal and two assists were stricken from the official records when Hamilton folded.

Returning to junior hockey for the 1945–46 OHA season, Hamilton was coached and managed by Eddie Ambis, and sponsored by Maurice Lloyd, the owner of Lloyds Glass. The Lloyds were granted extra time to prepare a roster and postponed their first week of games. Eddie Ambis coached the Lloyds, whose players were mostly promoted from the junior B or juvenile levels. The Lloyds lost their first game of the season by a 19–0 score to the St. Catharines Falcons, and earned their first victory by a 4–3 score versus the Toronto Young Rangers on December 5. The Lloyds concluded the season in last place with only three wins, and did not qualify for the playoffs.

Ambis returned as coach and manager of Hamilton for the 1946–47 OHA season, and recruited goaltender Bob DeCourcy. The team became known as the Szabos, sponsored by local businessman Michael A. Szabo. The Szabos placed ninth in the OHA with six victories, and did not qualify for the playoffs. The Szabos dropped out of the OHA prior to the 1947–48 season.

== Notable players ==
Five alumni from the Whizzers played in the National Hockey League (NHL): Walt Atanas, Al Dewsbury, Stan Kemp, Enio Sclisizzi, and Jack Stoddard. Carl Kaiser had a lengthy career playing in the Western Canada Senior Hockey League.

Four alumni from the Lloyds played in the NHL: Ray Frederick, Steve Kraftcheck, Glen Sonmor, and Jack Stoddard.

Two alumni from the Szabos played in the NHL: Bob DeCourcy, and Val Delory.

== Season-by-season results ==
Regular season and playoffs results:

- Hamilton Whizzers (1942–1944)
- Hamilton Barons (1944)
- Hamilton Lloyds (1945–46)
- Hamilton Szabos (1946–47)

Legend: GP = Games played, W = Wins, L = Losses, T = Ties, Pts = Points, GF = Goals for, GA = Goals against

Season	Team name	Regular season									Playoffs
Season	Team name	GP	W	L	T	Pts	Pct	GF	GA	Finish	Playoffs
1942–43	Whizzers	24	11	9	4	26	0.542	122	106	2nd OHA	Lost semifinal (Oshawa Generals) 4–1
1943–44	Whizzers	25	12	12	1	25	0.500	113	124	3rd Group 1	Won quarterfinal (Brantford Lions) 2–1; Won junior B challenge series (Toronto Navy) 2–0; Lost semifinal (Toronto St. Michael's Majors) 2–1
1944–45	Barons	1	0	1	0	0	0.000	0	9	withdrew	Did not qualify
1945–46	Lloyds	28	3	25	0	6	0.107	76	229	8th OHA	Did not qualify
1946–47	Szabos	38	6	32	0	12	0.158	76	313	9th OHA	Did not qualify
