= Ray Powell (ice hockey) =

Canadian ice hockey player

- Born: November 16, 1925 Timmins, Ontario, Canada
- Died: September 30, 1999 (aged 73) Kelowna, British Columbia, Canada
- Height: 5 ft 11 in (180 cm)
- Weight: 162 lb (73 kg; 11 st 8 lb)
- Position: Centre
- Shot: Left
- Played for: Chicago Black Hawks
- Playing career: 1944–1961

Raymond Henry Powell (November 16, 1925 – September 30, 1999) was a Canadian professional ice hockey player who played 31 games in the National Hockey League with the Chicago Black Hawks during the 1950–51 season. The rest of his career lasted from 1944 to 1961 and was spent in the minor leagues.

== Career statistics ==
=== Regular season and playoffs ===
			Regular season					Playoffs
Season	Team	League	GP	G	A	Pts	PIM	GP	G	A	Pts	PIM
1942–43	Sudbury Open Pit Miners	Exhib	—	—	—	—	—	—	—	—	—	—
1943–44	Brantford Lions	OHA	21	10	21	31	17	3	1	2	3	2
1943–44	Pittsburgh Hornets	AHL	2	0	0	0	0	—	—	—	—	—
1944–45	Baltimore Blades	EAHL	43	33	62	95	19	9	9	9	18	2
1944–45	New York Rovers	EAHL	1	0	0	0	0	—	—	—	—	—
1944–45	Buffalo Bisons	AHL	2	0	1	1	0	4	2	3	5	0
1945–46	New Haven Eagles	AHL	14	2	10	12	2	—	—	—	—	—
1945–46	Fort Worth Rangers	USHL	33	19	29	48	6	—	—	—	—	—
1946–47	Omaha Knights	USHL	—	—	—	—	—	—	—	—	—	—
1946–47	Kansas City Pla-Mors	USHL	55	28	42	70	6	—	—	—	—	—
1947–48	Kansas City Pla-Mors	USHL	62	37	47	84	16	12	5	8	13	0
1948–49	Kansas City Pla-Mors	USHL	61	48	58	106	22	2	0	2	2	0
1949–50	Kansas City Pla-Mors	USHL	64	27	84	111	11	3	0	1	1	0
1950–51	Chicago Black Hawks	NHL	31	7	15	22	2	—	—	—	—	—
1950–51	Milwaukee Seagulls	USHL	35	18	19	37	16	—	—	—	—	—
1951–52	Providence Reds	AHL	67	35	62	97	6	15	8	7	15	6
1952–53	Providence Reds	AHL	59	17	41	58	2	—	—	—	—	—
1953–54	Quebec Aces	QHL	68	22	55	77	10	16	3	8	11	6
1954–55	Quebec Aces	QHL	53	22	43	65	22	8	1	3	4	0
1955–56	Quebec Aces	QHL	59	15	33	48	30	6	1	0	1	8
1956–57	Victoria Cougars	WHL	34	10	9	19	4	3	1	2	3	0
1957–58	Kelowna Packers	OSHL	48	27	42	69	21	10	3	1	4	0
1958–59	Kelowna Packers	OSHL	—	—	—	—	—	—	—	—	—	—
1960–61	Kelowna Packers	OSHL	2	2	1	3	2	—	—	—	—	—
USHL totals			310	177	279	456	77	17	5	11	16	0
NHL totals			31	7	15	22	2	—	—	—	—	—
