= Les Kozak =

Canadian ice hockey player (born 1940)

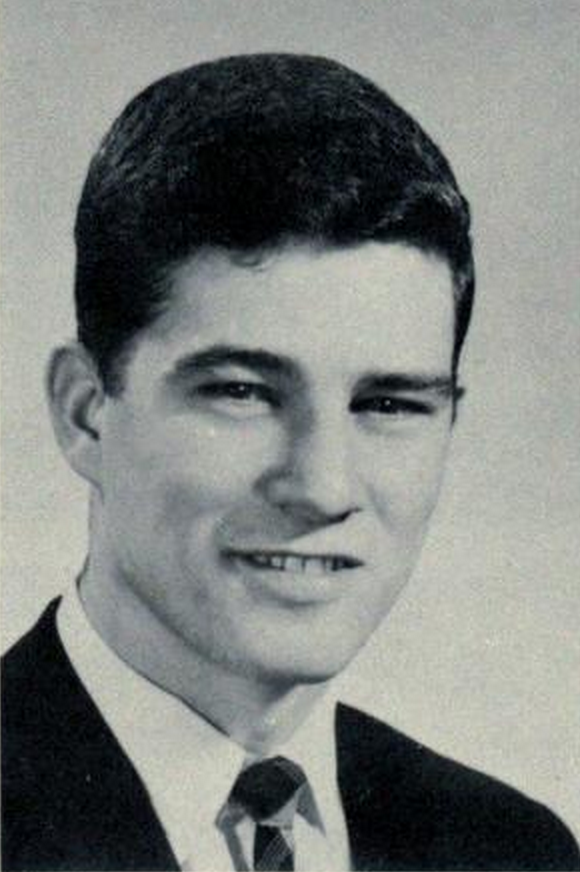
- Kozak at St. Michaels College, c. 1958
- Born: October 28, 1940 (age 85) Dauphin, Manitoba, Canada
- Height: 6 ft 0 in (183 cm)
- Weight: 185 lb (84 kg; 13 st 3 lb)
- Position: Left Wing
- Shot: Left
- Played for: Toronto Maple Leafs
- Playing career: 1961–1962

Leslie Paul Kozak (born October 28, 1940) is a Canadian former ice hockey player who played 12 games in the National Hockey League (NHL) for the Toronto Maple Leafs during the 1961–62 season, also spending the season with the Rochester Americans of the minor American Hockey League. Before turning professional Kozak spent three seasons with the Toronto St. Michael's Majors of the Ontario Hockey Association.

== Career statistics ==
=== Regular season and playoffs ===
			Regular season					Playoffs
Season	Team	League	GP	G	A	Pts	PIM	GP	G	A	Pts	PIM
1955–56	Melville Millionaires	SJHL	3	0	0	0	2	—	—	—	—	—
1956–57	Saskatoon Quakers	SJHL	1	0	0	0	0	—	—	—	—	—
1956–57	Toronto Marlboros	OHA	1	0	1	1	0	8	0	1	1	0
1957–58	Toronto St. Michael's Majors	OHA	38	9	15	24	10	3	0	0	0	0
1958–59	Toronto St. Michael's Majors	OHA	43	10	8	18	18	15	4	1	5	10
1959–60	Toronto St. Michael's Majors	OHA	42	18	17	35	34	10	2	2	4	10
1961–62	Toronto Maple Leafs	NHL	12	1	0	1	2	—	—	—	—	—
1961–62	Rochester Americans	AHL	45	14	9	23	31	—	—	—	—	—
AHL totals			45	14	9	23	31	—	—	—	—	—
NHL totals			12	1	0	1	2	—	—	—	—	—
