= Toronto St. Michael's Majors =

Canadian junior ice hockey team (1906–2012)

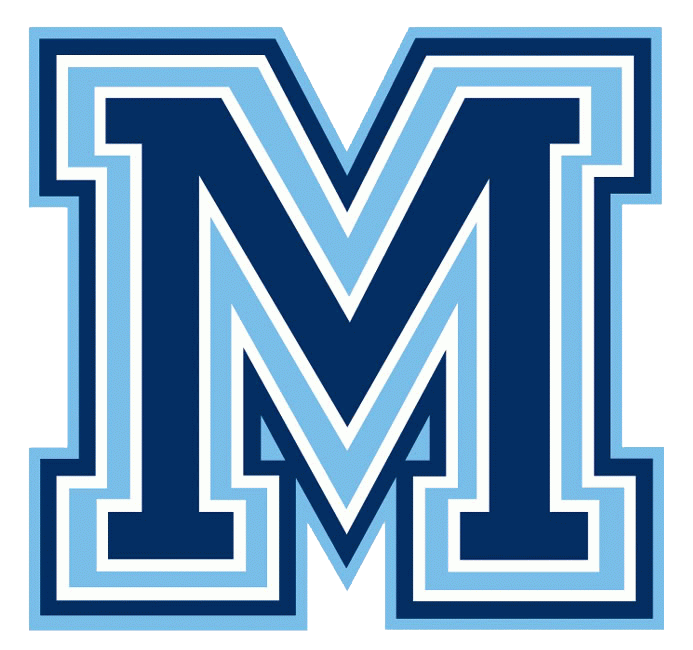
- City: Toronto, Ontario
- League: Ontario Hockey League
- Operated: 1906–1962 (Original); 1996–2012 (Revived)
- Home arena: Maple Leaf Gardens; St. Michael's College School Arena; Hershey Centre
- Colours: Light Blue, Navy, White, Gold
- Affiliates: St. Michael's Buzzers
- Parent clubs: Toronto Maple Leafs (ended 1962)

Franchise history
- 1906–1962: Toronto St. Michael's Majors
- 1996–2007: Toronto St. Michael's Majors
- 2007–2012: Mississauga St. Michael's Majors
- 2012–2024: Mississauga Steelheads
- 2024–present: Brampton Steelheads

Championships
- Playoff championships: Memorial Cup: 1934, 1945, 1947, 1961

The Toronto St. Michael's Majors were a Canadian major junior ice hockey team in the Ontario Hockey League, based in Toronto, Ontario. The most recent franchise was revived on August 15, 1996. In 2007, the team relocated to Mississauga, Ontario and became the Mississauga St. Michael's Majors until 2012. The hockey program was founded and operated by St. Michael's College School in 1906, and adopted the name "Majors" in 1934, and was commonly referred to as St. Mike's Majors.

== History ==
The St. Michael's College Hockey Team was established in 1906 when the team joined the junior division of the Ontario Hockey Association. The team was not known as the St. Michael's Majors until 1934, and also had the informal nickname of the "Irish". The school team played for 55 years until 1961 before suspending operations.

St. Michael's revived the Majors (Junior A Tier I) hockey team for the 1997–98 season in the Ontario Hockey League. In total, over one hundred St. Michael's Majors alumni have gone on to play in the National Hockey League, including 13 members of the Hockey Hall of Fame.

=== Early years, Allan Cup 1910 ===
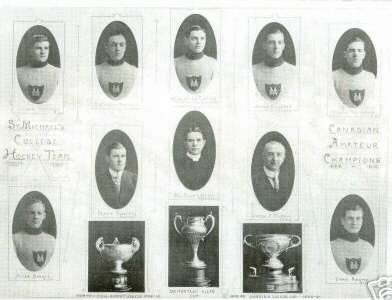
Allan Cup Champions, 1910

The hockey team was founded and operated by St. Michael's College School, a Catholic secondary school in uptown Toronto. The college's hockey team soon blossomed, as demand for a Catholic program was high. The school competed with their crosstown rivals, the Protestant organized Toronto Marlborough Athletic Club for Toronto's hockey supremacy. Players in the St. Michael's Majors program, were also enrolled in the school.

St. Michael's were successful in recruiting players and providing a complete education at the same time. The college built a strong reputation in moulding outstanding and well-rounded young citizens. Four years after the hockey program started, St. Michael's were Canadian Amateur Champions, winning the Allan Cup in 1910.

Birth of the Majors

In 1933, the Ontario Hockey Association's Junior division, split into 'A' and 'B' levels. St. Michael's also divided its hockey program into two teams accordingly. The Junior 'A' team became the Majors, the Junior 'B' team was known as St. Michael's Buzzers.

=== Memorial Cup 1934 ===
The Majors dominated the Junior A hockey scene during the 1933–34 season. The team was undefeated in the regular season, and kept rolling through the playoffs, the Ontario Championship, Eastern Canadian Championship and the Memorial Cup. Also of note, in 1933-34 the Buzzers won the Sutherland Cup as Ontario Junior 'B' champions.

St. Michael's featured the likes of Bobby Bauer, Reg Hamilton, Art Jackson, Regis (Pep) Kelly, Nick Metz, Don Wilson, Mickey Drouillard, goaltenders Harvey Teno and Jack Hamilton. The Toronto team was coached by Dr. W. J. (Jerry) Laflamme, a dentist who had quite a hockey history. He refereed in the NHL in the 1920s. That was after he had played defence on the Allan Cup winners from St. Michael's in 1909-1910 and captained the Allan Cup-winning Dentals of Toronto in 1916–17.

In the 1934 playoffs St. Michael's skated to 8–2, and 9-3 victories versus the Ottawa Shamrocks to win the two-game series for the Ontario title. In the following series, Toronto faced the Charlottetown Abegweits in the eastern final, played in Toronto. The Majors prevailed again in two games, by scores of 12-2 and 7–2. The Memorial Cup final was played at Shea's Amphitheatre in Winnipeg, where St. Michael's faced the Edmonton Athletic Club in a best-of-three series for the title. The Majors picked up Turk Broda from the Winnipeg Monarchs to back up if goaltender Harvey Teno was injured. St. Mike's opened with a 5–0 victory over the Athletics on April 3. More than 4,500 fans showed up for game 2 on April 5. St. Michael's won its first Memorial Cup championship, with a 6–4 victory in overtime.

1937 OHA Champions

St. Michael's made their second trip to the OHA finals in 1937, and again faced the same opponent from in 1934, the Stratford Midgets. Toronto prevailed winning 3 games to 2. In the Ontario Championship, St. Michael's faced a familiar foe in the Copper Cliff Redmen. The Redmen previously played in Newmarket in the same league as Toronto, but switched to NOHA. Toronto lost to the northern Ontario champions, in 2 straight games.

=== Memorial Cup 1945 ===
Joe Primeau returned to coach the 1945 Memorial Cup St. Michael's team, after being runners-up in the OHA finals in 1944. In 1945, Toronto won the J. Ross Robertson Cup, defeating the Galt Black Hawks in four games straight. The Majors advanced further by eliminating the Montreal Royals in six games in the eastern final. They won the sixth game 7-4 behind Joe Sadler's three goals in front of 10,548 fans at Maple Leaf Gardens on April 11.

The Memorial Cup final was played in its entirety at Maple Leaf Gardens. The Majors' opponents were the Moose Jaw Canucks coached by Roy Bentley. Toronto won game one 8–5 on April 14, then Moose Jaw turned the tables on April 16 with a 5–3 victory to even the series. The Majors won each of the next three games by scores of 6–3, 4-3 and 7–2 in the deciding game. Trail, B.C. native Frank Turik scored three hat tricks in the five games to become the tournament's leading goal scorer.

Paid attendance for the five games was 65,437, which exceeded the Maple Leaf Gardens junior record for five games (59,301) that had been set in 1943 when the Winnipeg Rangers tangled with the Oshawa Generals. That 1943 series still held the six-game record of 73,867.

=== Memorial Cup 1946 ===
St. Michael's returned to the Memorial Cup for a second consecutive year in 1946. The Majors defeated the Oshawa Generals in a six-game, coming back from two games behind for the OHA championship. St. Michael's then swept the Montreal Junior Canadiens in three games straight in the eastern finals.

The Majors met up with the Winnipeg Monarchs at Maple Leaf Gardens on April 13 to start the best-of-seven series for the national championship. Winnipeg won the first game 3 to 2, then Toronto rallied to win the next two games 5 to 3, and 7 to 3, before the Monarchs even the series in game four, winning 4 to 3. Toronto scored a 7 to 4 victory in game five, needing only one more win to be the second team to repeat as Memorial Cup champions. Winnipeg spoiled the plans, winning consecutive 4 to 2 victories to take the cup back west in 1946.

=== Memorial Cup 1947 ===
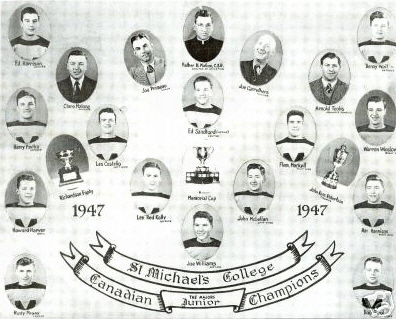
Memorial Cup Champions, 1947

The 1947 cup would be a rematch of the 1945 Memorial Cup final versus the Moose Jaw Canucks. This series however, was not played at Maple Leaf Gardens, but rather played in Winnipeg, Moose Jaw and Regina. On the road to their third consecutive Memorial Cup appearance, St. Michael's repeated their sweep of the Galt Black Hawks in the OHA finals from two 1945, and the previous year's sweep on the Montreal Jr. Canadiens in the eastern finals.

The Memorial Cup's best-of-seven final opened in Winnipeg on April 15 with Toronto hammering Moose Jaw 12 to 3. The teams then headed for Moose Jaw, where game two was to be played on April 17, at the newly constructed arena. Toronto St. Michael's won that game 6 to 1. Game three was played in Regina, which Toronto kept up its momentum, winning 8 to 1. Game three ended with seven minutes to play in the third period, when the ice was littered for a second time with broken bottles thrown from the stands. Three nights later in Regina, St. Michael's finished the series with a 3 to 2 victory, for their third Memorial Cup title.

=== Memorial Cup 1961 ===
The Basilian fathers lobbied for a shortened schedule for the Majors in the OHA's top tier of junior hockey after the 1958–59 season, since they believed it was too long and detrimental to academic studies for their students. Bob Goldham resigned as head coach of the Majors in 1960, and Father David Bauer took over as head coach for the 1960–61 OHA season in addition to his role as general manager. He stressed fundamentals of defensive play without the puck and taught players how to absorb contact without getting hurt. He occasionally had his players switch positions with one another to learn an appreciation of their teammate's contributions. The Majors finished in second place during the season, then defeated the Guelph Royals in the playoffs for the OHA championship. The Majors won the Eastern Canada final defeating the Moncton Beavers then travelled to Edmonton to play in the 1961 Memorial Cup. The Majors defeated the Edmonton Oil Kings in six games and won the school's fourth Memorial Cup.

== Majors cease operations ==
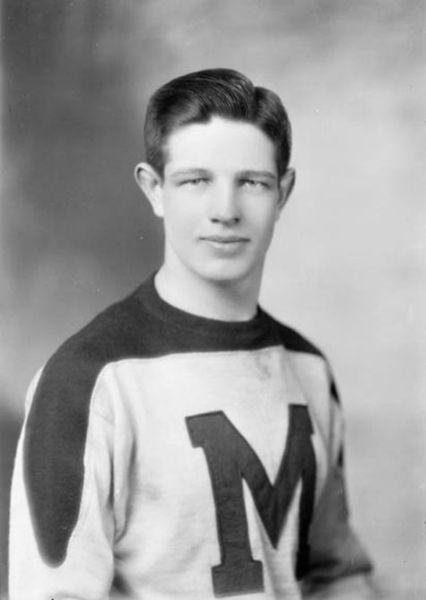
David Bauer

The Basilian fathers again discussed the length of the season and the amount of travel having an effect on academics. They were also concerned with increasing physical play and growing similarities with professional leagues. The Majors had played 98 games including the regular season and playoffs for the Memorial Cup. St. Michael's could no longer justify participation in the top tier of the OHA and chose to withdraw from the Ontario Hockey Association Junior A series. Bauer stated in a 1987 interview that, "We regretted very much leaving because we knew that this [school] is a major recreational institution in this country".

After the official announcement on June 6, 1961, Bauer placed his protégé Jim Gregory in charge of the team. The Majors operated for one more season and played a shortened 33-game schedule in the Metro Junior A League for the 1961–62 OHA season. The team was transferred to Neil McNeil High School and became known as the Toronto Neil McNeil Maroons in 1962.

Conn Smythe and the Toronto Maple Leafs wanted to keep the St. Michael's team in operation as a source of players, and then created the Metro Junior A League to help alleviate the college's concerns.

The St. Michael's team finished in first place in the Metro Junior A league, and competed for the J. Ross Robertson Cup again in 1962. Coached by Ted Flanagan, the team lost in the Cup finals to the Hamilton Red Wings.

Despite being the league champions in the 1961–62 season, St. Michael's discontinued its program altogether, and the team was relocated to Neil McNeil Catholic Secondary School in Scarborough, Ontario, becoming the Toronto Neil McNeil Maroons. Father Bauer chose to pursue building a university-educated Canadian National Team instead.

== Modern era ==
The modern era of the St. Michael's Majors began on August 15, 1996, when the college was admitted to the OHL as an expansion team. Players were required to attend St. Michael's College School in Toronto but this changed during the second season following player trade demands and refusals to attend. The team would take part each year in the Priority Selection drafting new players.

Founded by St. Michael's College School, the team was now owned by Eugene Melnyk, who was the owner of the Ottawa Senators and was CEO of Biovail Corporation. Melnyk pursued several deals to get a new arena for his team, but none came to fruition. One of Melnyk's foiled plans included purchasing Maple Leaf Gardens. The revived Majors struggled on the ice, and missed the playoffs in each of their first three seasons. During their second season, the Majors started strong, but traded four of their best players (Sheldon Keefe, Mike Jefferson, Ryan Barnes and Shawn Cation) to the Barrie Colts midway through the season, as a result of controversy surrounding David Frost.

The Majors made breakthroughs in their fourth season. Toronto reached the conference finals four consecutive years from 2001 to 2004. Their closest point to reaching the league finals was in 2003, leading 3 games to 2 versus the Ottawa 67's and losing game six on home ice in overtime.

The Majors played on the smallest ice surface in the OHL, which tended to have a higher average of shots on goal per game than other arenas. Fittingly, the Majors produced several noted goaltenders in their recent history, including Peter Budaj, Andy Chiodo and Justin Peters.

The Majors had strong rivalries with the Mississauga IceDogs and Brampton Battalion, both of which are local Greater Toronto Area teams who came into the OHL within a year of the Majors.

On July 12, 2006, Eugene Melnyk bought the Mississauga IceDogs. After the 2006–07 season, Melnyk sold the IceDogs, and moved the Majors to the Hershey Centre in Mississauga. The IceDogs, in turn, moved to Jack Gatecliff Arena in St. Catharines, Ontario.

=== Memorial Cup 2011 ===
The Majors won the right to host the 2011 Memorial Cup over the Barrie Colts, Kingston Frontenacs and Windsor Spitfires. The Ontario Hockey League (OHL) announced on May 10, 2010 that the Mississauga St. Michael's Majors were chosen to host the 93rd annual Memorial Cup at the Hershey Centre from May 20–29, 2011. The Saint John Sea Dogs defeated the Majors 3–1 in the final.

== Championships ==
Memorial Cup

- 1934 Champions vs. Edmonton Athletic Club
- 1945 Champions vs. Moose Jaw Canucks
- 1946 Finalists vs. Winnipeg Monarchs
- 1947 Champions vs. Moose Jaw Canucks
- 1961 Champions vs. Edmonton Oil Kings
- 2011 Finalists vs. Saint John Sea Dogs

George Richardson Memorial Trophy

- 1934 Champions vs. Charlottetown Abegweits
- 1945 Champions vs. Montreal Royals
- 1946 Champions vs. Montreal Junior Canadiens
- 1947 Champions vs. Montreal Junior Canadiens
- 1961 Champions vs. Moncton Beavers

Division titles

- 1961-62 Metro Junior A League
- 2001-02 Emms Trophy – Central Division
- 2003-04 Emms Trophy – Central Division
- 2010-11 Emms Trophy – Central Division

J. Ross Robertson Cup

- 1934 Champions vs. Stratford Midgets
- 1937 Champions vs. Stratford Midgets
- 1944 Finalists vs. Oshawa Generals
- 1945 Champions vs. Galt Red Wings
- 1946 Champions vs. Oshawa Generals
- 1947 Champions vs. Galt Red Wings
- 1953 Finalists vs. Barrie Flyers
- 1959 Finalists vs. Peterborough Petes
- 1960 Finalists vs. St. Catharines Teepees
- 1961 Champions vs. Guelph Royals
- 1962 Finalists vs. Hamilton Red Wings
- 2011 Finalists vs. Owen Sound Attack

== Uniforms and logos ==
Uniform history of the "modern era" Majors

The primary logo for the Majors displays "St. Michael's" written in script, with a Majors underscore written in light blue. The Toronto St. Michael's Majors colours are light blue, navy blue & white. The Majors hockey uniforms feature a different logo, a large letter "M" on the front, with the school crest (inset right) on the upper left chest, and the St. Michael's cloverleaf patch on the shoulders.

Home uniforms have a white background, navy blue shoulders and arms, with light blue trim. Road uniforms have a light blue background, with navy blue shoulders, and white trim. The Majors have also used a third jersey with a stylized "M" on the front, and without the navy blue shoulders.

To celebrate the Majors 10th season back in the league, the team launched a new 3rd jersey with the shoulder cloverleaf logo on the front. The jersey is also baby blue in colour. After the move, the Majors' logo was changed slightly to a more modernized look, and new jerseys were unveiled.

== Arenas ==
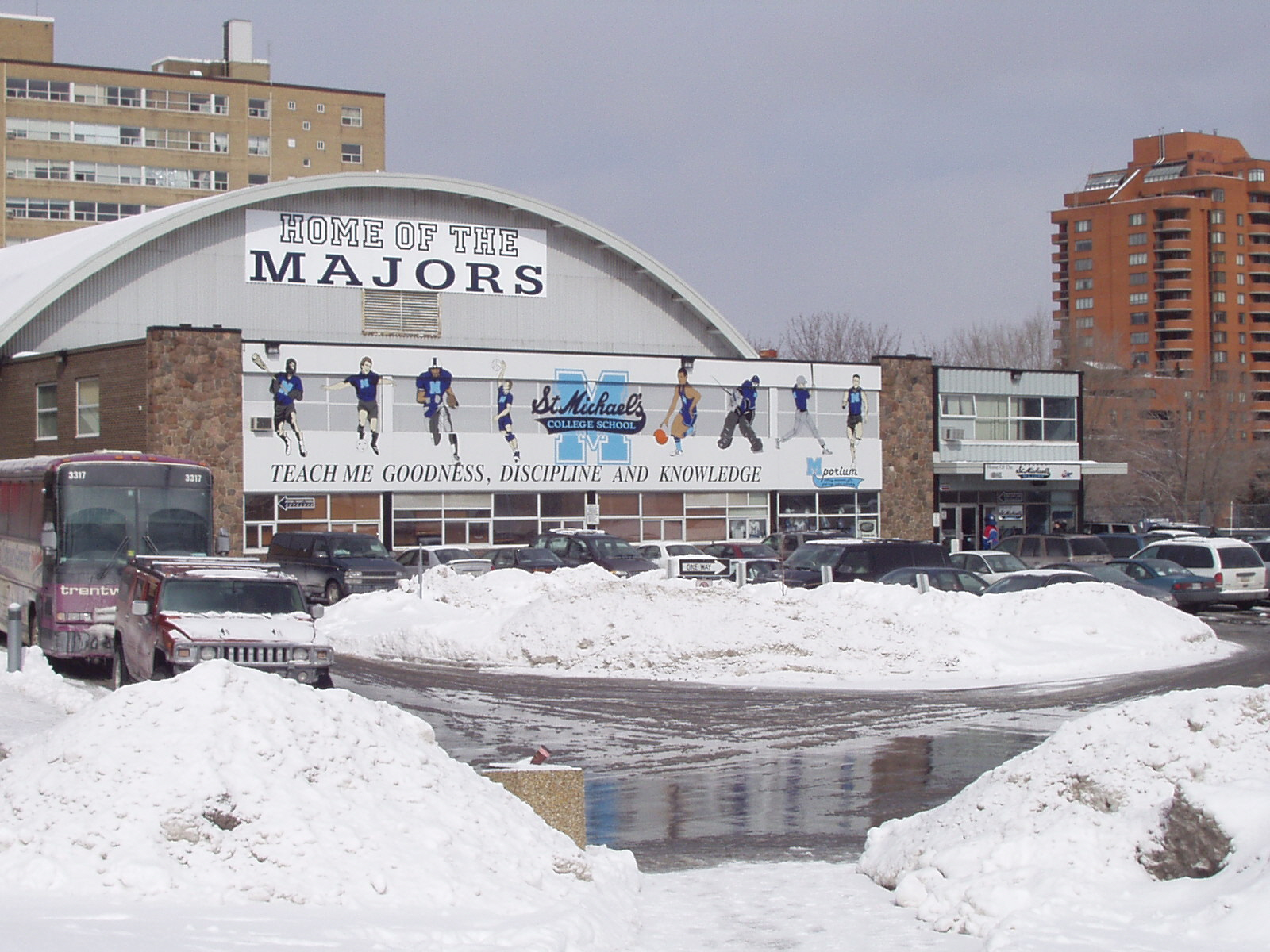
St. Michael's Arena

The St. Michael's Majors played at the school-owned St. Michael's College School Arena. The arena is located in uptown Toronto near the intersection of Bathurst Street and St. Clair Avenue behind St. Michael's College School. The college arena was by far the smallest in the Ontario Hockey League in terms of both ice size and seating. The arena is home to the St. Michael's Buzzers of the Ontario Provincial Junior A Hockey League.

The St. Michael's Majors played at Maple Leaf Gardens for their first three seasons from 1997 to 2000. The original Majors had played at Maple Leaf Gardens from its construction in 1931 to their folding in the early 1960s. When the Gardens was scheduled to close a year after the last Toronto Maple Leafs game, Maple Leaf Sports and Entertainment evicted the Majors, who moved to the arena on the college campus. The major junior team had only played there rarely before.

The Majors also played selected home games during the 1999–00 season at the Air Canada Centre vs the Mississauga IceDogs and Brampton Battalion, and also an inter-league game versus the Montreal Rocket.

In 2003-04 and 2006–07 seasons, the Majors played two home games vs the Ottawa 67's at Scotiabank Place in Kanata, Ontario. This arose from the common ownership between the St. Michael's Majors and the Ottawa Senators by Eugene Melnyk.

The Mississauga St. Michael's Majors played home games at the Hershey Centre in northeast Mississauga, near the junction of Highway 401 & Highway 403. The Hershey Centre hosted the OHL All-Star Game in 2000. The arena also hosted the 2011 Memorial Cup from May 19–29.

== Coaches ==
List of modern era coaches with multiple seasons in parentheses.

- 1997–98 Mark Napier (2)
- 1998–99 Mark Napier & Mike Futa
- 1999–2000 Mike Futa & Mark Osborne
- 2000–2004 Dave Cameron (8)
- 2004–2007 Bud Stefanski (3)
- 2007–2011 Dave Cameron (8)
- 2011–12 James Boyd

== Players ==
=== Award winners ===
- 1944-45 - **Leo Gravelle** Eddie Powers Memorial Trophy Scoring Champion
- 1945-46 - **Tod Sloan** Red Tilson Trophy Most Outstanding Player, Eddie Powers Memorial Trophy Scoring Champion
- 1946-47 - **Ed Sandford** Red Tilson Trophy Most Outstanding Player
- 1946-47 - **Fleming Mackell** Eddie Powers Memorial Trophy Scoring Champion
- 1956-57 - **Frank Mahovlich** Red Tilson Trophy Most Outstanding Player
- 1959-60 - **Gerry Cheevers** Dave Pinkney Trophy Lowest Team GAA
- 1960-61 - **Brucer Draper** William Hanley Trophy Most Sportsmanlike Player
- 1997 - **Charlie Stephens** Jack Ferguson Award First Overall Draft Pick
- 1997-98 - **Bujar Amidovski** Leo Lalonde Memorial Trophy Overage Player of the Year & OHL Goaltender of the Year
- 2000-01 - **Andy Chiodo** F.W. "Dinty" Moore Trophy Best Rookie GAA
- 2002-03 - **Andy Chiodo** OHL Goaltender of the Year
- 2003-04 - **Scott Lehman** Bobby Smith Trophy Scholastic Player of the Year

=== Honoured players ===
The St. Michael's Majors have retired four jersey numbers:

- **3** - Red Kelly
- **5** - Ted Lindsay
- **9** - Dave Keon
- **12** - Dick Duff

The St. Michael's Majors have honoured the following people with banners in the rafters.

- Bobby Bauer
- David Bauer
- Gerry Cheevers
- Tim Horton
- Frank Mahovlich

=== NHL alumni ===
Hockey Hall of Fame inductees listed in bold type.

Original era Majors (1906 to 1962)

- Lou Angotti
- John Arundel
- Larry Aurie
- Ray Barry
- **Bobby Bauer**
- **David Bauer**
- Frank Bennett
- **Turk Broda**
- Arnie Brown
- Stan Brown
- Mike Buchanan
- Jack Caffery
- Ed Chadwick
- Andre Champagne
- **Gerry Cheevers**
- Terry Clancy
- Wally Clune
- Eddie Convey
- Mike Corbett
- Norm Corcoran
- Les Costello
- **Murray Costello**
- D'arcy Coulson
- Jack Crawford
- Bob DeCourcy
- Bill Dineen
- Gary Dineen
- Bruce Draper
- Clarence Drouillard
- Dave Dryden
- **Dick Duff**
- Frank Dunlap
- Reggie Fleming
- Leo Gravelle
- Reg Hamilton
- Gord Hannigan
- Pat Hannigan
- Ray Hannigan
- Ed Harrison
- **Tim Horton**
- Fred Hunt
- Art Jackson
- Harold Jackson
- Don Keenan
- Larry Keenan
- Pep Kelly
- **Red Kelly**
- **Dave Keon**
- Paul Knox
- Les Kozak
- Leo Labine
- **Ted Lindsay**
- Fleming MacKell
- Barry MacKenzie
- Billy MacMillan
- **Frank Mahovlich**
- Cesare Maniago
- Jean Marois
- Willie Marshall
- Jack Martin
- Dick Mattiussi
- John McCormack
- Bill McDonagh
- John McLellan
- Gerry McNamara
- Pat McReavy
- Don Metz
- Nick Metz
- Rudy Migay
- Gus Mortson
- **Reg Noble**
- Peanuts O'Flaherty
- Tom O'Neill
- Gerry Odrowski
- Tom Polanic
- Noel Price
- **Joe Primeau**
- **Frank Rankin**
- Marc Reaume
- Bill Regan
- Bob Sabourin
- Phil Samis
- Ed Sandford
- Rod Seiling
- Tod Sloan
- Darryl Sly
- Carl Smith
- Gary Smith
- Harvey Teno
- Jimmy Thomson
- Dave Trottier
- Gene Ubriaco
- Mike Walton
- Don Willson
- Benny Woit

Modern era Majors (1997 to 2012)

- Ryan Barnes
- Darryl Bootland
- Darryl Boyce
- Tim Brent
- Peter Budaj
- Trevor Carrick
- Andy Chiodo
- Casey Cizikas
- Cal Clutterbuck
- Joseph Cramarossa
- Mike Danton
- Kaspars Daugavins
- Dylan DeMelo
- Matt Ellis
- Cameron Gaunce
- Sheldon Keefe
- Kevin Klein
- Scott Lehman
- Spencer Martin
- Nathan McIver
- Shane O'Brien
- Stuart Percy
- Mark Popovic
- Zac Rinaldo
- Kerby Rychel
- Justin Shugg
- Devante Smith-Pelly
- Charlie Stephens

== Season-by-season results ==
- Toronto St. Michael's Majors regular season and playoffs results (1936–1937), (1942–1962), (1997–2007):
- Mississauga St. Michael's Majors regular season and playoffs results (2007–2012):

Legend: GP = Games played, W = Wins, L = Losses, T = Ties, OTL = Overtime losses, SL = Shoot-out losses, Pts = Points, GF = Goals for, GA = Goals against

Memorial Cup champions	Memorial Cup finalists	League champions	League finalists

Season	Regular season											Playoffs
Season	GP	W	L	T	OTL	SOL	Pts	Pct	GF	GA	Finish	Playoffs
1933–34	12	12	0	0	–	–	24	1.000	–	–	1st Group 7	Won group final (Oshawa Majors) 18–6; Won semifinal (Toronto Young Rangers) 13–3; Won OHA final (Stratford Midgets) 2–0; Won junior A-B playoff (St. Michael's Buzzers) 12–3; Won Eastern Canada quarterfinal (New Liskeard Farmers) 28–5; Won Eastern Canada semifinal (Ottawa Shamrocks) 17–5; Won Eastern Canada final (Charlottetown Abegweits) 19–4; Won 1934 Memorial Cup final (Edmonton Athletic Club) 2–0
1934–35	12	6	5	1	–	–	13	0.542	46	37	3rd Group 1	Lost group semifinal (Toronto Lions) 8–7
1935–36	9	8	1	0	–	–	16	0.889	45	15	1st Group 1	Won group semifinal (Toronto Native Sons) 9–6; Lost group final (West Toronto Nationals) 3–0
1936–37	12	9	2	1	–	–	19	0.792	62	27	1st Group 1	Won group semifinal (Toronto Young Rangers) 2–1; Won group final (Toronto British Consols) 3–0; Won OHA final (Stratford Midgets) 3–2; Lost Eastern Canada quarterfinal (Copper Cliff Redmen) 2–0
1937–38	12	7	5	0	–	–	14	0.583	52	38	3rd OHA	Lost group semifinal (Toronto Marlboros) 2–0
1938–39	14	10	4	0	–	–	20	0.714	70	43	1st Group 1	Lost semifinal (Oshawa Generals) 3–1
Did not operate from 1939 to 1941
1941–42	24	10	14	0	–	–	20	0.417	66	120	6th OHA	Lost quarterfinal (Toronto Young Rangers) 2–0
1942–43	21	9	11	1	–	–	23	0.450	92	99	6th OHA	Won quarterfinal (Toronto Marlboros) 2–1; Lost semifinal (Brantford Lions) 2–1
1943–44	25	21	4	0	–	–	44	0.840	169	69	2nd Group 1	Won quarterfinal (Galt Canadians) 3–1; Won semifinal (Hamilton Whizzers) 2–1; Lost OHA final (Oshawa Generals) 4–1
1944–45	19	18	1	0	–	–	36	0.947	174	54	1st OHA	Won semifinal (St. Catharines Falcons) 4–1; Won OHA final (Galt Red Wings) 4–0; Won Eastern Canada semifinal (Porcupine Combines) 3–0; Won Eastern Canada final (Montreal Royals) 4–2; Won 1945 Memorial Cup final (Moose Jaw Canucks) 4–1
1945–46	28	26	2	0	–	–	52	0.929	199	54	1st OHA	Won semifinal (Galt Red Wings) 4–1; Won OHA final (Oshawa Generals) 4–2; Won Eastern Canada semifinal (Copper Cliff Redmen) 2–0; Won Eastern Canada final (Montreal Junior Canadiens) 3–0; Lost 1946 Memorial Cup final (Winnipeg Monarchs) 4–3
1946–47	36	33	3	0	–	–	66	0.917	234	59	1st OHA	Won semifinal (Oshawa Generals) 4–1; Won OHA final (Galt Red Wings) 4–0; Won Eastern Canada semifinal (Porcupine Combines) 3–0; Won Eastern Canada final (Montreal Junior Canadiens) 3–0; Won 1947 Memorial Cup final (Moose Jaw Canucks) 4–0
1947–48	32	6	26	0	–	–	16	0.188	76	135	9th OHA	Did not qualify
1948–49	48	13	31	4	–	–	30	0.312	96	128	8th OHA	Did not qualify
1949–50	48	19	26	3	–	–	41	0.427	164	213	6th OHA	Lost quarterfinal (Barrie Flyers) 3–2
1950–51	54	16	31	7	–	–	39	0.361	189	244	9th OHA	Did not qualify
1951–52	53	30	20	3	–	–	63	0.594	227	188	4th OHA	Won quarterfinal (Galt Black Hawks) 3–0; Lost semifinal (St. Catharines Teepees) 3–2
1952–53	56	31	18	7	–	–	69	0.616	238	181	3rd OHA	Won quarterfinal (St. Catharines Teepees) 3–0; Won semifinal (Galt Black Hawks) 4–1–1; Lost OHA final (Barrie Flyers) 5–3
1953–54	59	30	26	3	–	–	63	0.534	246	211	4th OHA	Lost semifinal (St. Catharines Teepees) 4–3–1
1954–55	49	26	19	4	–	–	56	0.571	171	151	4th OHA	Lost semifinal (St. Catharines Teepees) 4–0–1
1955–56	48	22	23	3	–	–	47	0.490	181	197	5th OHA	Won quarterfinal (Guelph Biltmores) 3–0; Lost semifinal (Barrie Flyers) 3–2
1956–57	52	23	24	5	–	–	51	0.490	195	189	4th OHA	Lost semifinal (Guelph Biltmores) 4–0
1957–58	52	23	22	7	–	–	53	0.510	176	189	3rd OHA	Won quarterfinal (Barrie Flyers) 3–1; Lost semifinal (Hamilton Tiger Cubs) 2–1–2
1958–59	48	19	24	5	–	–	51	0.448	149	159	4th OHA	Won semifinal (St. Catharines Teepees) 4–2–1; Lost OHA final (Peterborough Petes) 3–2–3
1959–60	48	23	19	6	–	–	52	0.542	149	150	4th OHA	Won semifinal (Toronto Marlboros) 4–0; Lost OHA final (St. Catharines Teepees) 3–1–2
1960–61	48	26	16	6	–	–	58	0.604	160	160	2nd OHA	Won quarterfinal (St. Catharines Teepees) 4–2; Won semifinal (Hamilton Red Wings) 4–2–1; Won OHA final (Guelph Royals) 4–2–1; Won Eastern Canada final (Moncton Beavers) 3–0; Won 1961 Memorial Cup final (Edmonton Oil Kings 4–2
1961–62	33	25	7	1	–	–	55	0.773	170	91	1st Metro Jr. A	Won semifinal (Whitby Dunlops) 4–1; Won Metro Jr. A final (Toronto Marlboros) 4–3; Lost Ontario Junior A final (Hamilton Red Wings) 4–1
Did not operate from 1962 to 1997 (see Toronto Neil McNeil Maroons for 1962–63 season)
1997–98	66	15	42	9	–	–	39	0.295	154	265	6th Eastern	Did not qualify
1998–99	68	20	42	6	–	–	46	0.338	214	316	4th Central	Did not qualify
1999–2000	68	18	44	2	4	–	42	0.279	203	281	4th Central	Did not qualify
2000–01	68	35	23	8	2	–	80	0.574	213	188	2nd Central	Won conference quarterfinals (Peterborough Petes) 4–3; Won conference semifinals (Sudbury Wolves) 4–3; Lost conference finals (Ottawa 67's) 4–0
2001–02	68	40	19	8	1	–	89	0.647	230	177	1st Central	Won conference quarterfinals (North Bay Centennials) 4–0; Won conference semifinals (Ottawa 67's) 4–3; Lost conference finals (Barrie Colts) 4–0
2002–03	68	32	24	7	5	–	76	0.522	207	214	2nd Central	Won conference quarterfinals (Belleville Bulls) 4–3; Won conference semifinals (Brampton Battalion) 4–1; Lost conference finals (Ottawa 67's) 4–3
2003–04	68	38	21	7	2	–	85	0.610	210	187	1st Central	Won conference quarterfinals (Sudbury Wolves) 4–3; Won conference semifinals (Brampton Battalion) 4–1; Lost conference finals (Mississauga IceDogs) 4–2
2004–05	68	29	30	6	3	–	67	0.471	177	202	5th Central	Won conference quarterfinals (Mississauga IceDogs) 4–1; Lost conference semifinals (Peterborough Petes) 4–1
2005–06	68	32	26	–	6	4	74	0.544	259	285	4th Central	Lost conference quarterfinals (Barrie Colts) 4–0
2006–07	68	20	41	–	4	3	47	0.346	225	325	5th Central	Did not qualify
The Majors relocated from Toronto to Mississauga
2007–08	68	31	32	–	2	3	67	0.493	203	243	3rd Central	Lost conference quarterfinals (Niagara IceDogs) 4–0
2008–09	68	39	26	–	1	2	81	0.596	229	208	2nd Central	Won conference quarterfinals (Barrie Colts) 4–1; Lost conference semifinals (Brampton Battalion) 4–2
2009–10	68	42	20	–	4	2	90	0.662	222	175	2nd Central	Won conference quarterfinals (Peterborough Petes) 4–0; Won conference semifinals (Ottawa 67's) 4–3; Lost conference finals (Barrie Colts) 4–1
2010–11	68	53	13	–	0	2	108	0.794	287	170	1st Central	Won conference quarterfinals (Belleville Bulls) 4–0; Won conference semifinals (Sudbury Wolves) 4–0; Won conference finals (Niagara IceDogs) 4–1; Lost OHL finals (Owen Sound Attack) 4–3; Lost 2011 Memorial Cup final (Saint John Sea Dogs) 3–1
2011–12	68	33	26	–	1	7	74	0.537	201	219	5th Central	Lost conference quarterfinals (Barrie Colts) 4–2

== Bibliography ==
- Oliver, Greg (2017). Father Bauer and the Great Experiment: The Genesis of Canadian Olympic Hockey. Toronto, Ontario: ECW Press. ISBN 978-1-77041-249-1.
- Lapp, Richard M.; Macaulay, Alec (1997). The Memorial Cup: Canada's National Junior Hockey Championship. Madeira Park, British Columbia: Harbour Publishing. ISBN 1-55017-170-4.
