= Don Keenan (ice hockey) =

Canadian ice hockey player (1938–2005)

- Born: August 8, 1938 Toronto, Ontario, Canada
- Died: November 29, 2005 (aged 67)
- Height: 6 ft 0 in (183 cm)
- Weight: 170 lb (77 kg; 12 st 2 lb)
- Position: Goaltender
- Caught: Left
- Played for: Boston Bruins
- Playing career: 1959–1959

Donald Robert James Keenan (August 8, 1938 – November 29, 2005) was a Canadian professional ice hockey goaltender who played in one National Hockey League game for the Boston Bruins during the 1958–59 season, on March 7, 1959 against the Toronto Maple Leafs. He previously played for St. Francis Xavier University.

== Career statistics ==
=== Regular season and playoffs ===
			Regular season									Playoffs
Season	Team	League	GP	W	L	T	MIN	GA	SO	GAA	SV%	GP	W	L	MIN	GA	SO	GAA	SV%
1955–56	St. Michael's Majors	OHA	2	—	—	—	120	10	0	5.00	—	—	—	—	—	—	—	—	—
1956–57	St. Francis Xavier University	MIHC	7	5	0	2	420	22	0	3.14	—	—	—	—	—	—	—	—	—
1957–58	St. Francis Xavier University	MIHC	7	7	0	0	420	18	1	2.57	—	—	—	—	—	—	—	—	—
1958–59	Boston Bruins	NHL	1	0	1	0	60	4	0	4.00	.902	—	—	—	—	—	—	—	—
NHL totals			1	0	1	0	60	4	0	4.00	.902	—	—	—	—	—	—	—	—

== See also ==
- List of players who played only one game in the NHL
