= Stan Kemp =

Canadian ice hockey player

- Born: March 2, 1924 Hamilton, Ontario, Canada
- Died: August 15, 1999 (aged 75)
- Height: 5 ft 9 in (175 cm)
- Weight: 165 lb (75 kg; 11 st 11 lb)
- Position: Defence
- Shot: Right
- Played for: Toronto Maple Leafs
- Playing career: 1943–1957

Stanley Gordon "Bud" Kemp (March 2, 1924 – August 15, 1999) was a Canadian professional ice hockey defenceman who played in one game in the National Hockey League for the Toronto Maple Leafs during the 1948–49 season, on January 23, 1949 against the Detroit Red Wings. The rest of his career, which lasted from 1943 to 1957, was mainly spent in the American Hockey League and senior Ontario Hockey Association.

== Career statistics ==
=== Regular season and playoffs ===
			Regular season					Playoffs
Season	Team	League	GP	G	A	Pts	PIM	GP	G	A	Pts	PIM
1942–43	Hamilton Whizzers	OHA	24	11	9	20	17	5	1	1	2	8
1943–44	Providence Reds	AHL	47	3	8	11	43	—	—	—	—	—
1944–45	Providence Reds	AHL	57	16	40	56	37	—	—	—	—	—
1945–46	Providence Reds	AHL	49	12	16	28	30	2	0	1	1	0
1946–47	Pittsburgh Hornets	AHL	64	3	11	14	64	12	1	0	1	13
1947–48	Pittsburgh Hornets	AHL	68	10	20	30	93	2	0	1	1	2
1948–49	Toronto Maple Leafs	NHL	1	0	0	0	2	—	—	—	—	—
1948–49	Pittsburgh Hornets	AHL	68	13	34	47	90	—	—	—	—	—
1949–50	Pittsburgh Hornets	AHL	70	11	17	28	82	—	—	—	—	—
1950–51	Hamilton Tigers	OHA Sr	2	0	0	0	0	—	—	—	—	—
1950–51	Toronto Marlboros	OHA Sr	22	3	8	11	46	3	0	0	0	6
1951–52	Hamilton Tigers	OHA Sr	20	4	48	18	—	—	—	—	—	—
1951–52	Brantford Redmen	OHA Sr	26	5	14	19	95	7	0	2	2	14
1952–53	Brantford Redmen	OHA Sr	48	6	20	26	73	5	1	3	4	10
1953–54	Hamilton Tigers	OHA Sr	44	8	28	36	74	2	0	0	0	0
1954–55	Kitchener-Waterloo Dutchmen	OHA Sr	49	15	17	32	74	10	1	3	4	18
1954–55	Kitchener-Waterloo Dutchmen	Al-Cup	—	—	—	—	—	17	1	3	4	29
1955–56	Stratford Indians	OHA Sr	7	2	6	8	50	—	—	—	—	—
1955–56	Kitchener-Waterloo Dutchmen	OHA Sr	44	5	22	27	0	10	3	2	5	16
1956–57	Stratford Indians	OHA Sr	36	9	15	24	24	5	1	3	4	4
OHA Sr totals			276	54	136	190	390	39	6	13	19	62
NHL totals			1	0	0	0	2	—	—	—	—	—

== See also ==
- List of players who played only one game in the NHL
