= Garden City Arena Complex =

Arena in St. Catharines, Ontario, Canada

Coordinates: 43°9′38″N 79°14′20″W

Gatorade Garden City Complex
- The Jack, The Dog Pound
- Interactive map of Gatorade Garden City Complex
- Former names: Garden City Arena (1938-1996); Jack Gatecliff Arena Complex (1996-2007); Gatorade Garden City Complex (2007-2014)
- Location: 8 Gale Crescent, St. Catharines
- Owner: City of St. Catharines
- Operator: City of St. Catharines
- Capacity: Hockey: 3,145 (2,800 seated)
- Surface: Multi-surface
- Field size: 190 x 85 feet

Construction
- Groundbreaking: 1936
- Opened: December 20, 1938
- Renovated: 1996
- Closed: 2022
- Demolished: 2023

Tenants
- St. Catharines Falcons (OHA) (1943-1947); St. Catharines Teepees (OHA) (1947-1962); St. Catharines Black Hawks (OHA/OMJHL) (1962-1976); St. Catharines Falcons (GOJHL) (1968-2022); St. Catharines Fincups (OMJHL) (1977-1978); St. Catharines Saints (AHL) (1982-1986); Niagara IceDogs (OHL) (2007-2014); St. Catharines Athletics Jr. A (OJALL) (2015-2022)

The Garden City Arena Complex (formerly the Gatorade Garden City Complex) was a sports complex in St. Catharines, Ontario. The complex housed two arena pads - the Jack Gatecliff Arena (formerly known as Garden City Arena), and the smaller Rex Stimers Arena. It was the main arena facility in St. Catharines from its opening in 1938 until the opening of the Meridian Centre in 2014.

== History ==
The original arena was constructed in 1938, and was named the Garden City Arena. The arena was opened on December 20th, 1938, when the Toronto Maple Leafs played an exhibition game against three local teams. From 1943 to 1978, the arena was home to a major junior hockey team under several different names. The St. Catharines Teepees won the Memorial Cup in 1954 and 1960. Several players for these St. Catharines hockey teams would become Hockey Hall of Famers, including Pierre Pilote, Bobby Hull, Stan Mikita, Phil Esposito, Marcel Dionne and Mike Gartner. Beginning in 1968, Garden City Arena was home to St. Catharines Jr. B Falcons. The Falcons would play at the arena every year until its closure. From 1982 to 1986, Garden City Arena was home to Toronto Maple Leafs farm team, the St. Catharines Saints of the American Hockey League.

In 1996, Garden City Arena was renamed after local sportswriter Jack Gatecliff after extensive renovations. The renovations combined the Jack Gatecliff Arena and Rex Stimers Arena into a single building. The smaller arena was named for Rex Stimers, a popular sportscaster with local radio station CKTB for a period of 32 years beginning in 1934.

The complex was renamed the Gatorade Garden City Complex on September 19, 2007, after the naming rights were sold to Gatorade. Upon the expiry of the naming agreement, the complex was renamed the Garden City Arena Complex.

Beginning in 2007, the Jack Gatecliff Arena was home to the Niagara IceDogs of the OHL. The Niagara Icedogs moved into the new Meridian Centre for the 2014–15 season. The final capacity of the Jack Gatecliff Arena was 3,145, including standing room. Seating capacity in the Rex Stimers Arena was 800 seats.

Upon the complex's closure in 2022, the Falcons moved into the already existing Seymour-Hannah Sports and Entertainment Centre for the 2022–23 season. Demolition of the building began in July 2023, with the Rex Stimers Arena being demolished first. Demolition was completed in September of 2023.

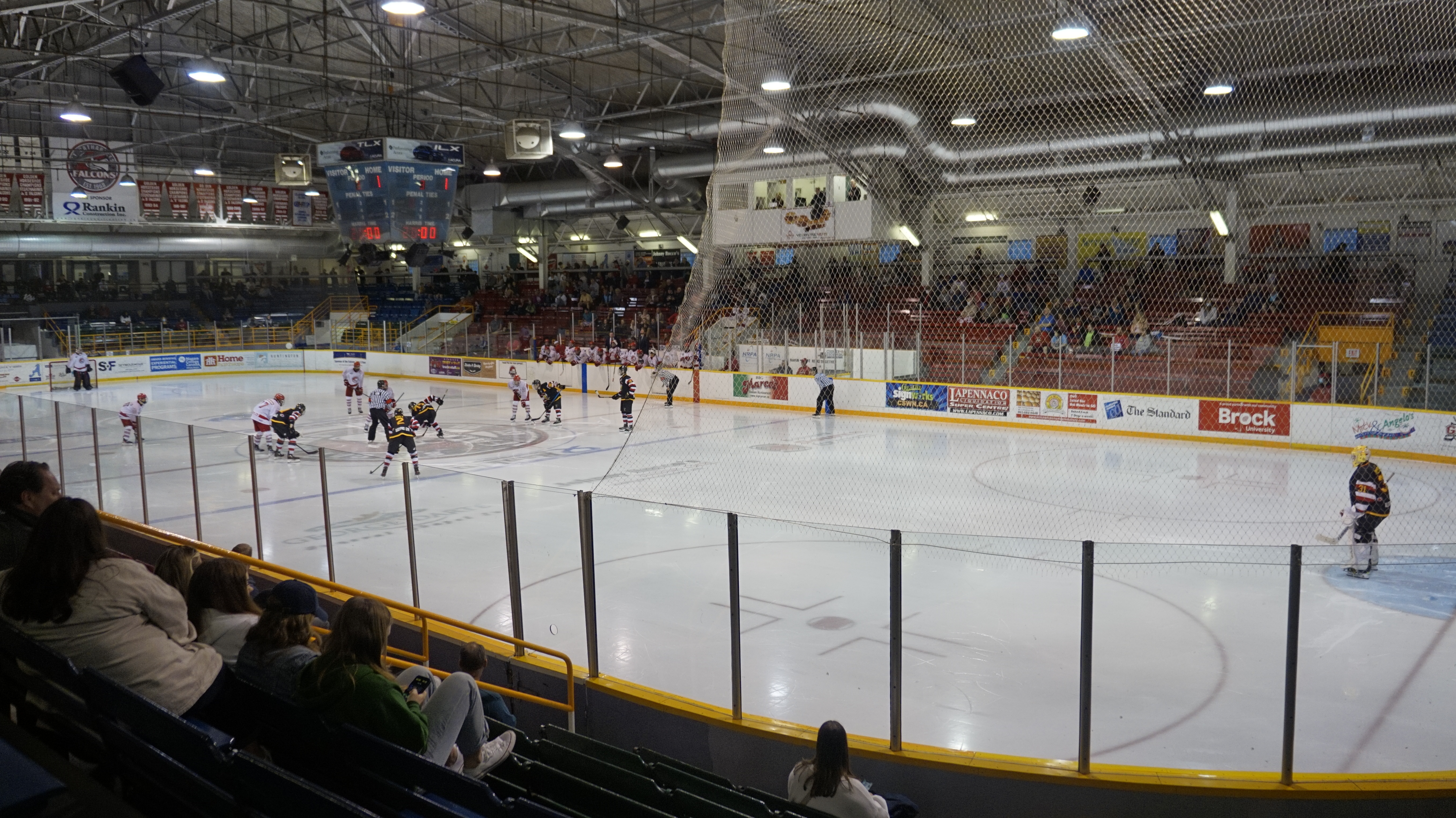
The St. Catharines Falcons playing at Jack Gatecliff Arena in 2022; this was one of the final hockey games played at the arena.
