= Francis Kane (ice hockey) =

Canadian ice hockey player

Frank Kane
- Born: January 19, 1923; Stratford, Ontario, Canada
- Died: March 29, 2016 (aged 93); Arlington, Texas, United States
- Height: 5 ft 11 in (180 cm)
- Weight: 190 lb (86 kg; 13 st 8 lb)
- Position: Defence
- Shot: Left
- Played for: Detroit Red Wings
- Playing career: 1943–1951

Francis Joseph "Red" Kane (January 19, 1923 — March 29, 2016) was a Canadian professional ice hockey player who played two games in the National Hockey League for the Detroit Red Wings during the 1943–44 season. The rest of his career, which lasted from 1943 to 1951, was spent in various minor leagues. He was born in Stratford, Ontario.

== Career statistics ==
=== Regular season and playoffs ===
			Regular season					Playoffs
Season	Team	League	GP	G	A	Pts	PIM	GP	G	A	Pts	PIM
1941–42	Falconbridge Falcons	NOJHA	9	1	1	2	10	2	1	0	1	0
1942–43	Brantford Lions	OHA	20	3	3	6	42	10	1	3	4	18
1943–44	Detroit Red Wings	NHL	2	0	0	0	0	—	—	—	—	—
1943–44	Indianapolis Capitals	AHL	51	6	13	19	17	5	0	4	4	0
1944–45	Indianapolis Capitals	AHL	59	4	8	12	95	5	0	0	0	4
1945–46	St. Louis Flyers	AHL	5	0	0	0	10	—	—	—	—	—
1945–46	Tulsa Oilers	USHL	47	8	7	15	127	13	0	0	0	14
1946–47	Fort Worth Rangers	USHL	59	3	13	16	69	8	0	0	0	12
1947–48	Fort Worth Rangers	USHL	57	8	15	23	61	4	0	3	3	0
1948–49	Fort Worth Rangers	USHL	62	2	22	24	116	2	1	1	2	2
1949–50	Los Angeles Monarchs	PCHL	51	4	7	11	88	16	1	8	9	43
1950–51	New Haven Eagles	AHL	28	1	7	8	45	—	—	—	—	—
1950–51	Springfield Indians	AHL	11	0	1	1	4	—	—	—	—	—
1950–51	Vancouver Canucks	PCHL	18	1	9	10	25	—	—	—	—	—
USHL totals			225	21	57	78	353	27	1	4	5	28
NHL totals			2	0	0	0	0	—	—	—	—	—
