= St. Catharines Falcons (1943–1947) =

Canadian junior ice hockey team (1943–1947)

- City: St. Catharines, Ontario
- League: Ontario Hockey Association
- Operated: 1943–1947
- Home arena: Garden City Arena

Franchise history
- 1943–1947: St. Catharines Falcons
- 1947–1962: St. Catharines Teepees
- 1962–1976: St. Catharines Black Hawks
- 1976–1982: Niagara Falls Flyers
- 1982–2002: North Bay Centennials
- 2002–present: Saginaw Spirit

The St. Catharines Falcons were a Canadian junior ice hockey team in the Ontario Hockey Association from 1943 to 1947. The team was based in St. Catharines, Ontario.

== History ==
St. Catharines was introduced to junior ice hockey in 1943, when local senior hockey players Rudy Pilous and Jay MacDonald, were inspired to establish a team after watching a 1943 Memorial Cup game at Maple Leaf Gardens between the Winnipeg Rangers and Oshawa Generals. The Falcons played home games at the Garden City Arena in St. Catharines.

Pilous became coach of the team, while MacDonald was secretary and treasurer. The Falcons played their first game on November 13, 1943, defeating the Brantford Lions by a 5–1 score. When the Falcons were in financial trouble in January 1947, George Stauffer, the president of Thompson Products, purchased the Falcons for $2,500, and renamed the team the St. Catharines Teepees.

== Notable players ==
Doug McMurdy was awarded the Red Tilson Trophy as the most outstanding player during the 1944–45 OHA season.

Five alumni of the Falcons played in the National Hockey League, including Armand Delmonte, Val Delory, Bing Juckes, Nick Mickoski, and Bob Wood.

== Season-by-season results ==
Regular season and playoffs results:

Legend: GP = Games played, W = Wins, L = Losses, T = Ties, Pts = Points, GF = Goals for, GA = Goals against

Season	Regular season									Playoffs
Season	GP	W	L	T	Pts	Pct	GF	GA	Finish	Playoffs
1943–44	26	15	9	2	32	0.615	125	103	1st OHA Group 2	Lost semifinal (Oshawa Generals) 4–2
1944–45	20	12	8	0	24	0.600	101	93	2nd OHA	Lost semifinal (Toronto St. Michael's Majors) 4–1
1945–46	28	14	14	0	28	0.500	133	123	4th OHA	Lost quarterfinal (Oshawa Generals) 3–1
1946–47	36	7	25	4	18	0.250	101	219	8th OHA	Did not qualify
