= Brantford Lions =

Canadian junior ice hockey team (1933–1946)

- City: Brantford, Ontario
- League: Ontario Hockey Association
- Operated: 1933 to 1946 (junior A & B)

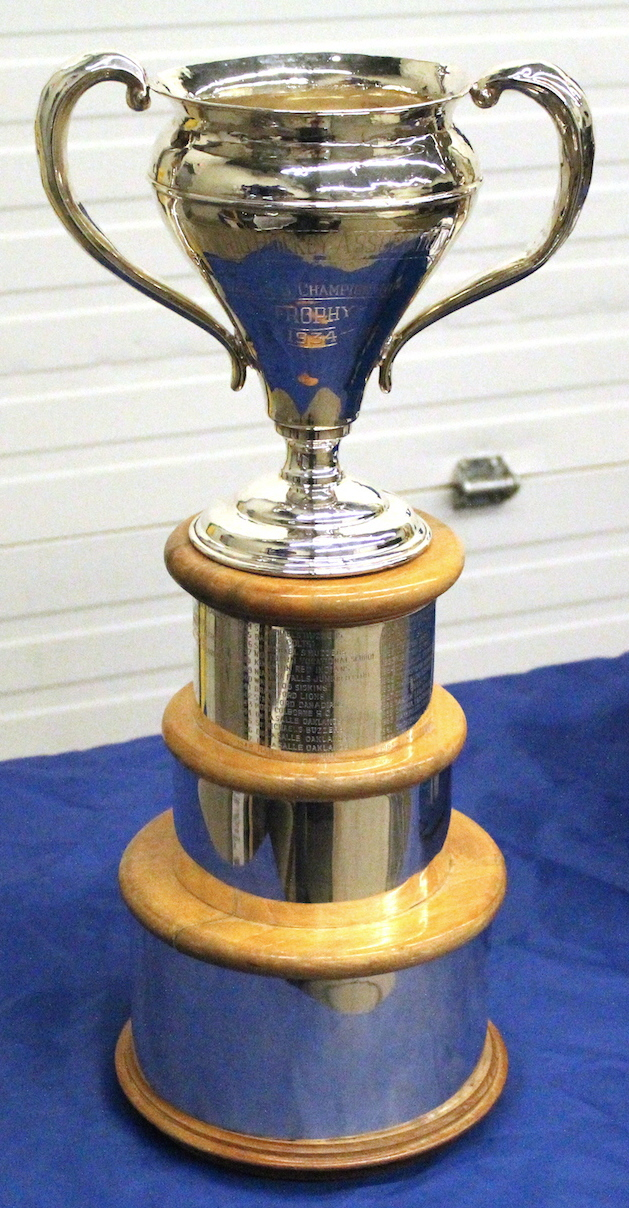
The Sutherland Cup trophy

The Brantford Lions were a Canadian junior ice hockey team in the Ontario Hockey Association (OHA), based in Brantford, Ontario. The Lions played at the junior A level from 1933 to 1936, and from 1941 to 1944. In the intermediate years, they played at the junior B level from 1936 to 1941, and from 1944 to 1946. They were OHA junior B champions in the 1940–41 season, winning the Sutherland Cup.

Hockey Hall of Fame defenceman Bill Quackenbush played for the Lions in the 1941–42 season. Bob Wiest led the league in scoring the same season, with 40 goals and 28 assists in 40 games. Branford finished first place in the OHA for the 1941–42 season, but lost in the first round of the playoffs to the defending champions, the Oshawa Generals. The Lions were finalists for the J. Ross Robertson Cup in 1943, but again lost to the Oshawa Generals.

== National Hockey League alumni ==
Brantford Lions alumni who graduated to play in the National Hockey League:

Junior A alumni

- Fred Hunt
- Francis Kane
- Howie Meeker
- Ray Powell
- Bill Quackenbush
- Thain Simon
- Cliff Simpson

Junior B alumni

- Leo Gravelle
- Tom McGrattan
- Leo Reise Jr.
- Bill Wylie

== Season-by-season results ==
Regular season results:

Legend: GP = Games played, W = Wins, L = Losses, T = Ties, Pts = Points, GF = Goals for, GA = Goals against

Memorial Cup champions	League champions	League finalists

Season	Regular season									Playoffs
Season	GP	W	L	T	Pts	Pct	GF	GA	Finish	Playoffs
1941–42	24	19	5	0	38	0.792	183	83	1st OHA	Lost semifinal (Oshawa Generals) 4–3
1942–43	22	12	10	2	26	0.591	102	98	2nd OHA	Won quarterfinal (Stratford Kroehlers) 2–0; Won semifinal (Toronto St. Michael's Majors) 2–1; Lost OHA final (Oshawa Generals) 4–1
1943–44	25	11	13	1	23	0.460	90	126	3rd Group 2	Lost quarterfinal (Hamilton Whizzers) 2–1
