= Max Kaminsky Trophy =

Ontario Hockey League annual award (1961–)

- Sport: Ice hockey
- Awarded for: Most outstanding defenceman in OHL

History
- First award: 1961
- First winner: Bruce Draper (1961 - most gentlemanly player); Ron Plumb (1970 - most outstanding defenceman)
- Most recent: Kashawn Aitcheson (2026)

The Max Kaminsky Trophy is an annual award presented by the Ontario Hockey League (OHL). Originally (1961–1969) awarded to the most gentlemanly player in the league, since 1970 it is awarded to the OHL's most outstanding defenceman.

The award is named in honour of Max Kaminsky, who coached the St. Catharines Teepees to a Memorial Cup win in May 1960; he retired after the Memorial Cup, and died of cancer in May 1961.

The winner of the Max Kaminsky Trophy is the OHL's nominee for the CHL Defenceman of the Year.

== Max Kaminsky Trophy winners (1961–1969) ==
OHL most gentlemanly player
Season	Winner	Team
1960–61	Bruce Draper	Toronto St. Michael's Majors
1961–62	Lowell MacDonald	Hamilton Red Wings
1962–63	Paul Henderson	Hamilton Red Wings
1963–64	Fred Stanfield	St. Catharines Black Hawks
1964–65	Jimmy Peters Jr.	Hamilton Red Wings
1965–66	Andre Lacroix	Peterborough Petes
1966–67	Mickey Redmond	Peterborough Petes
1967–68	Tom Webster	Niagara Falls Flyers
1968–69	Rejean Houle	Montreal Junior Canadiens

== Max Kaminsky Trophy winners (1970–present) ==
denotes player also named CHL Defenceman of the Year

OHL most outstanding defenceman
Season	Player	Team
1969–70	Ron Plumb	Peterborough Petes
1970–71	Jocelyn Guevremont	Montreal Junior Canadiens
1971–72	Denis Potvin	Ottawa 67's
1972–73	Denis Potvin	Ottawa 67's
1973–74	Jim Turkiewicz	Peterborough Petes
1974–75	Mike O'Connell	Kingston Canadians
1975–76	Rick Green	London Knights
1976–77	Craig Hartsburg	Sault Ste. Marie Greyhounds
1977–78	Brad Marsh	London Knights
1977–78	Rob Ramage	London Knights
1978–79	Greg Theberge	Peterborough Petes
1979–80	Larry Murphy	Peterborough Petes
1980–81	Randy Boyd	Ottawa 67's
1981–82	Ron Meighan	Niagara Falls Flyers
1982–83	Al MacInnis	Kitchener Rangers
1983–84	Brad Shaw	Ottawa 67's
1984–85	Bob Halkidis	London Knights
1985–86	Jeff Brown	Sudbury Wolves
1985–86	Terry Carkner	Peterborough Petes
1986–87	Kerry Huffman	Guelph Platers
1987–88	Darryl Shannon	Windsor Spitfires
1988–89	Bryan Fogarty	Niagara Falls Thunder
1989–90	John Slaney	Cornwall Royals
1990–91	Chris Snell	Ottawa 67's
1991–92	Drake Berehowsky	North Bay Centennials
1992–93	Chris Pronger	Peterborough Petes
1993–94	Jamie Rivers	Sudbury Wolves
1994–95	Bryan Berard	Detroit Junior Red Wings
1995–96	Bryan Berard	Detroit Whalers
1996–97	Sean Blanchard	Ottawa 67's
1997–98	Chris Allen	Kingston Frontenacs
1998–99	Brian Campbell	Ottawa 67's
1999–2000	John Erskine	London Knights
2000–01	Alexei Semenov	Sudbury Wolves
2001–02	Eric Reitz	Barrie Colts
2002–03	Brendan Bell	Ottawa 67's
2003–04	James Wisniewski	Plymouth Whalers
2004–05	Danny Syvret	London Knights
2005–06	Andrej Sekera	Owen Sound Attack
2006–07	Marc Staal	Sudbury Wolves
2007–08	Drew Doughty	Guelph Storm
2008–09	Ryan Ellis	Windsor Spitfires
2009–10	Jake Muzzin	Sault Ste. Marie Greyhounds
2010–11	Ryan Ellis	Windsor Spitfires
2011–12	Dougie Hamilton	Niagara IceDogs
2012–13	Ryan Sproul	Sault Ste. Marie Greyhounds
2013–14	Aaron Ekblad	Barrie Colts
2014–15	Tony DeAngelo	Sarnia & Sault Ste. Marie
2015–16	Mikhail Sergachev	Windsor Spitfires
2016–17	Darren Raddysh	Erie Otters
2017–18	Nicolas Hague	Mississauga Steelheads
2018–19	Evan Bouchard	London Knights
2019–20	Noel Hoefenmayer	Ottawa 67's
2020–21	Not awarded, season cancelled due to COVID-19 pandemic	
2021–22	Nathan Staios	Hamilton Bulldogs
2022–23	Pavel Mintyukov	Saginaw/Ottawa
2023–24	Zayne Parekh	Saginaw Spirit
2024–25	Sam Dickinson	London Knights
2025–26	Kashawn Aitcheson	Barrie Colts

== See also ==
- Emile Bouchard Trophy – Quebec Major Junior Hockey League Defenceman of the Year
- Bill Hunter Memorial Trophy – Western Hockey League Defenceman of the Year
- List of Canadian Hockey League awards
