= Toronto Lions =

Canadian junior ice hockey team (1931–1939)

- City: Toronto, Ontario
- League: Ontario Hockey Association
- Operated: 1931 to 1939
- Home arena: Varsity Arena

The Toronto Lions were a Canadian junior ice hockey team in the Ontario Hockey Association (OHA) from 1931 to 1939, based in Toronto. The team was previously known as the Victorias until changing their name in 1931 when affiliating with the Lions Club.

== History ==
The Toronto Lions began play in the 1931–32 OHA season, and where previously known as the Toronto Victorias until changing their name when affiliating with the Lions Club. Beginning the 1931–32 season, they were coached by Eddie Livingstone, played home games at Varsity Arena, and were in the same group as the Toronto Native Sons. In the playoffs for their group, the Toronto Lions lost the third game versus North Toronto by a 4–3 score in overtime and lost the series by 11 goals to 10.

In the 1934–35 OHA season, the Lions defeated the Toronto St. Michael's Majors in their group's playoffs semifinals, by a cumulative score of eight goals to seven in three games. Facing the Oshawa Majors in the group finals, the Lions lost in two consecutive games. In the 1935–36 OHA season, the Lions lost to the Toronto Young Rangers in a sudden-death tiebreaker for fourth place in their group.

With the onset of World War II, the Toronto Lions did not return for the 1939–40 OHA season.

== Notable players ==
Centre Jimmy Good won the OHA scoring title in the 1934–35 season, playing with future Hockey Hall of Fame inductee Gordie Drillon on right wing. Three alumni of the Toronto Lions graduated to play in the National Hockey League; including Drillon, Charlie Phillips, and Lefty Wilson.

== Season-by-season results ==
Regular season and playoffs results:

Legend: GP = Games played, W = Wins, L = Losses, T = Ties, Pts = Points, GF = Goals for, GA = Goals against

Season	Regular season									Playoffs
Season	GP	W	L	T	Pts	Pct	GF	GA	Finish	Playoffs
1931–32	9	8	1	0	16	0.889	34	13	1st Group 6	Lost group final (North Toronto) 11–10
1932–33	8	3	5	0	6	0.375	28	28	3rd Group 3	Did not qualify
1933–34	12	5	6	1	17	–	47	32	3rd Group 7	Did not qualify
1934–35	13	9	4	0	18	0.692	66	56	3rd Group 1	Won group semifinal (Toronto St. Michael's Majors) 8–7; Lost group final (Oshawa Majors) 2–0
1935–36	10	3	7	0	6	0.300	23	33	5th Group 1	Lost 4th-place tiebreaker (Toronto Young Rangers) 6–3
1936–37	12	3	9	0	6	0.250	36	66	5th Group 1	Did not qualify
1937–38	11	1	10	0	2	0.091	22	72	7th OHA	Did not qualify
1938–39	14	1	13	0	2	0.071	24	76	4th Group 2	Did not qualify
