= George Parsons (ice hockey) =

Canadian ice hockey player

- Born: June 28, 1914 Toronto, Ontario, Canada
- Died: June 30, 1998 (aged 84) Oakville, Ontario, Canada
- Height: 6 ft 0 in (183 cm)
- Weight: 165 lb (75 kg; 11 st 11 lb)
- Position: Left wing
- Shot: Left
- Played for: Toronto Maple Leafs
- Playing career: 1930–1940

George Henry Parsons (June 28, 1914 – June 30, 1998) was a Canadian professional ice hockey left winger who played 64 games with the Toronto Maple Leafs. Parsons suffered a career-ending eye injury in 1939, forcing him to retire from the National Hockey League. Parsons later became involved with CCM hockey and the development of hockey helmets and facial protection. The George Parsons Trophy is given annually to the player judged to be the most sportsmanlike at the Memorial Cup tournament.

== Playing career ==
Parsons played four seasons of junior ice hockey from 1930 to 1934 and appeared in the 1933 Memorial Cup as a member of the West Toronto Nationals, and the 1934 Memorial Cup as a member of the Toronto Young Rangers. While still a junior in 1932, he was also used as a call-up to senior hockey teams in the Toronto Mercantile Hockey League, and the Toronto Independent Hockey League. Parsons participated in the 1935 Allan Cup with the Toronto All-Stars.

Parsons signed as a free agent with the Maple Leafs on October 22, 1935. Parsons played the 1935–36 season with the International Hockey League's Syracuse Stars, then made his NHL debut playing five games with the Leafs in the 1936–37 NHL season. He finished the season as a member of the Syracuse Stars who won the inaugural Calder Cup in the 1936–37 AHL season. He began the next season with Syracuse, then moved up to the Leafs.

An on-ice accident at Maple Leaf Gardens against the Chicago Black Hawks resulted in Parsons losing his left eye.

"I remember the date well. It was March 3rd, 1939. I was 24 years old. Earl Robinson of Chicago tried to lift my stick but he hit me in the eye. When I was in the hospital the president of the league, Frank Calder, visited me and suggested that I shouldn't play again."— George Parsons

Parsons was forced to retire from the NHL due to a rule prohibiting players with reduced sight. The league had previously adopted the Trushinski Bylaw by-law which forbade players with one eye to play. It was named after a minor league player named Frank Trushinski, who had lost sight in one eye, and then lost most of the sight in his other eye.

== CCM hockey ==
Parsons became involved with CCM hockey, helping to develop helmets and facial protection that would be safer for players. Within CCM, he was the North American sales manager to vice-president of product development. By early 1976, CCM had developed a hockey helmet complete with eye and face shield and lower face protector that was both approved by the Canadian Standards Association and endorsed by the Canadian Amateur Hockey Association.

== Career statistics ==
=== Regular season and playoffs ===
			Regular season					Playoffs
Season	Team	League	GP	G	A	Pts	PIM	GP	G	A	Pts	PIM
1930–31	Toronto Native Sons	OHA	9	4	2	6	4	2	0	0	0	0
1931–32	Toronto Nationals	OHA	10	11	2	13	11	3	0	1	1	2
1931–32	Toronto City Services	TMHL	9	6	1	7	4	2	0	0	0	0
1932–33	West Toronto Nationals	OHA	9	8	2	10	10	5	3	1	4	8
1932–33	Toronto City Services	TMHL	14	3	2	5	6	5	6	1	7	10
1932–33	West Toronto Nationals	M-Cup	—	—	—	—	—	6	7	2	9	10
1933–34	Toronto Young Rangers	OHA	6	13	9	22	8	1	0	1	1	0
1933–34	Toronto City Services	TMHL	14	11	1	12	6	9	11	4	15	26
1933–34	Toronto Young Rangers	M-Cup	—	—	—	—	—	2	2	0	2	4
1934–35	Toronto City Services	TIHL	13	14	4	18	15	7	4	4	8	17
1934–35	Toronto All-Stars	OHA-Sr	13	13	1	14	10	6	3	1	4	2
1934–35	Toronto All-Stars	Al-Cup	—	—	—	—	—	6	11	3	14	6
1935–36	Syracuse Stars	IHL	48	20	17	37	18	3	0	0	0	0
1936–37	Toronto Maple Leafs	NHL	5	0	0	0	0	—	—	—	—	—
1936–37	Syracuse Stars	IAHL	43	26	11	37	32	9	3	3	6	0
1937–38	Syracuse Stars	IAHL	17	6	8	14	17	—	—	—	—	—
1937–38	Toronto Maple Leafs	NHL	30	5	6	11	6	7	3	2	5	11
1938–39	Toronto Maple Leafs	NHL	43	7	7	14	14	—	—	—	—	—
NHL totals			78	12	13	25	20	7	3	2	5	11
