= Birmingham Bulls =

Birmingham Bulls may refer to:

- Birmingham Bulls (WHA), a defunct ice hockey team from the World Hockey Association and Central Hockey League
- Birmingham Bulls (ACHL), a defunct ice hockey team from the Atlantic Coast Hockey League
- Birmingham Bulls (SPHL), an American ice hockey team in the Southern Professional Hockey League
- Birmingham Bulls (ECHL), a defunct American ice hockey team from the East Coast Hockey League
- Birmingham Bulls (American football), a British American football team
- Birmingham Bulldogs or Birmingham Bulls, a British rugby league team
- Birmingham Bulls, British speedway reserve team of the Birmingham Brummies
