= Ross Wilson (ice hockey) =

Canadian ice hockey player (1919–2002)

- Born: October 15, 1919 Toronto, Ontario, Canada
- Died: November 4, 2002 (aged 83) Naples, Florida, United States
- Height: 5 ft 11 in (180 cm)
- Weight: 178 lb (81 kg; 12 st 10 lb)
- Position: Goaltender
- Caught: Left
- Played for: Boston Bruins; Toronto Maple Leafs; Detroit Red Wings
- Playing career: 1944–1950; 1953; 1956; 1957

Ross Ingram "Lefty" Wilson (October 15, 1919 – November 4, 2002) was a Canadian ice hockey player. He served as an emergency goaltender on three occasions between 1953 and 1957, playing one game with each of the Detroit Red Wings, Toronto Maple Leafs, and Boston Bruins.

== Biography ==
Wilson was a trainer for the Detroit Red Wings of the National Hockey League from 1950–1982. He won four Stanley Cup championships with Detroit, in 1950, 1952, 1954 and 1955. He was one of the early pioneers of the goaltender's protective mask, making the iconic mask that Terry Sawchuk wore, among many others.

Wilson, who played goal in Junior A, the American Hockey League, and in senior leagues, served as an emergency backup goaltender for the Red Wings and for visiting teams, which was customary among NHL trainers in the days before designated backup goaltenders. On October 10, 1953 Wilson suited up for the Red Wings in relief for an injured Sawchuk, in a losing effort, playing 16 minutes. On January 22, 1956 Wilson played for the Maple Leafs, replacing an injured Harry Lumley in another loss, playing 13 minutes and stopping 9 shots. On December 29, 1957 Wilson played for Boston, replacing an injured Don Simmons in a game that ended in a 2-2 tie, playing 52 minutes, allowing a goal, and making 23 saves.

== Career statistics ==
=== Regular season and playoffs ===
			Regular season									Playoffs
Season	Team	League	GP	W	L	T	MIN	GA	SO	GAA	SV%	GP	W	L	MIN	GA	SO	GAA	SV%
1937–38	Toronto Lions	OHA	11	—	—	—	660	72	0	6.55	—	—	—	—	—	—	—	—	—
1944–45	Toronto Navy	TIHL	7	5	2	0	430	33	0	4.60	—	7	4	3	420	47	0	6.71	—
1944–45	Toronto Uptown Tires	TMHL	8	4	4	0	480	41	0	5.13	—	1	0	1	60	7	0	7.00	—
1945–46	Omaha Knights	USHL	3	—	—	—	180	15	0	4.99	—	—	—	—	—	—	—	—	—
1945–46	St. Paul Saints	USHL	1	—	—	—	60	4	0	4.00	—	—	—	—	—	—	—	—	—
1947–48	Indianapolis Capitals	AHL	2	0	1	0	80	7	0	5.25	—	—	—	—	—	—	—	—	—
1948–49	Indianapolis Capitals	AHL	2	1	0	0	80	4	0	3.00	—	—	—	—	—	—	—	—	—
1949–50	Indianapolis Capitals	AHL	3	2	1	0	180	12	0	4.00	—	—	—	—	—	—	—	—	—
1953–54	Detroit Red Wings	NHL	1	0	0	0	17	0	0	0.00	—	—	—	—	—	—	—	—	—
1955–56	Toronto Maple Leafs	NHL	1	0	0	0	14	0	0	0.00	1.000	—	—	—	—	—	—	—	—
1957–58	Boston Bruins	NHL	1	0	0	1	52	1	0	1.16	.958	—	—	—	—	—	—	—	—
NHL totals			3	0	0	1	81	1	0	0.74	—	—	—	—	—	—	—	—	—
