= Vern Kaiser =

Canadian ice hockey player

- Born: September 28, 1925 Preston, Ontario, Canada
- Died: January 17, 2011 (aged 85) Penticton, British Columbia, Canada
- Height: 6 ft 0 in (183 cm)
- Weight: 180 lb (82 kg; 12 st 12 lb)
- Position: Defence
- Shot: Left
- Played for: Montreal Canadiens
- Playing career: 1944–1954

Vernon Charles Kaiser (September 28, 1925 – January 17, 2011) was a Canadian professional ice hockey defenceman. He played 50 games in the National Hockey League for the Montreal Canadiens during the 1950–51 season. The rest of his career, which lasted from 1944 to 1954, was spent in the minor leagues. He was born in Preston, Ontario.

== Career statistics ==
=== Regular season and playoffs ===
			Regular season					Playoffs
Season	Team	League	GP	G	A	Pts	PIM	GP	G	A	Pts	PIM
1942–43	Preston Riversides	OHA-B	—	—	—	—	—	—	—	—	—	—
1943–44	Port Colborne Recreationists	OHA-B	26	15	12	27	63	—	—	—	—	—
1943–44	Brantford Lions	OHA	—	—	—	—	—	3	1	0	1	5
1944–45	Winnipeg HMCS Chippewas	WSrHL	4	0	1	1	10	6	0	2	2	8
1945–46	Washington Lions	EAHL	—	—	—	—	—	—	—	—	—	—
1945–46	New York Rovers	EAHL	46	5	6	11	83	12	0	0	0	20
1946–47	Seattle Ironmen	PCHL	50	10	8	18	153	9	1	2	3	10
1947–48	Fort Worth Rangers	USHL	59	13	18	31	41	4	1	0	1	2
1948–49	Springfield Indians	AHL	61	25	17	42	32	3	1	1	2	4
1949–50	Springfield Indians	AHL	64	19	19	38	65	2	1	0	1	0
1950–51	Montreal Canadiens	NHL	50	7	5	12	33	2	0	0	0	0
1950–51	Buffalo Bisons	AHL	15	7	13	20	4	4	1	2	3	2
1951–52	Buffalo Bisons	AHL	58	24	26	50	67	2	0	1	1	2
1952–53	Buffalo Bisons	AHL	61	14	15	29	87	—	—	—	—	—
1953–54	Montreal Royals	QSHL	43	14	22	36	27	—	—	—	—	—
1953–54	Syracuse Warriors	AHL	17	11	11	22	10	—	—	—	—	—
AHL totals			276	100	101	201	265	11	3	4	7	8
NHL totals			50	7	5	12	33	2	0	0	0	0
