= Gordie Drillon =

Canadian ice hockey player (1913–1986)

- Hockey Hall of Fame, 1975
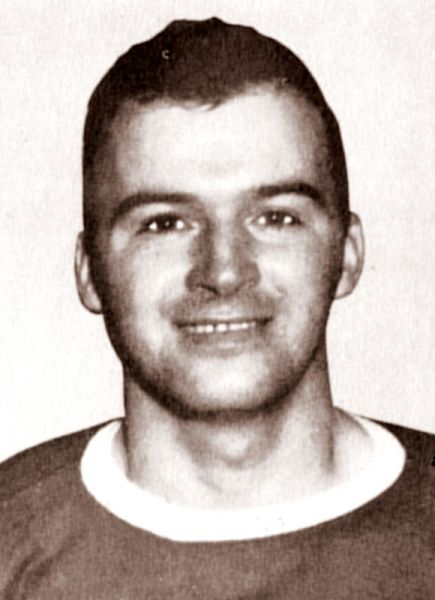
- Born: October 23, 1913 Moncton, New Brunswick, Canada
- Died: September 23, 1986 (aged 72) Saint John, New Brunswick, Canada
- Height: 6 ft 0 in (183 cm)
- Weight: 186 lb (84 kg; 13 st 4 lb)
- Position: Right wing
- Shot: Right
- Played for: Toronto Maple Leafs; Montreal Canadiens
- Playing career: 1935–1950

Gordon Arthur Drillon (October 23, 1913 – September 23, 1986) was a Canadian professional ice hockey player. He was born in Moncton, New Brunswick, Canada. From 1936 through to 1942 he was part of one of the National Hockey League (NHL)'s most prolific scoring lines as a member of the Toronto Maple Leafs. He won a Stanley Cup during the 1941–42 season, and was inducted into the Hockey Hall of Fame in 1975.

== Playing career ==
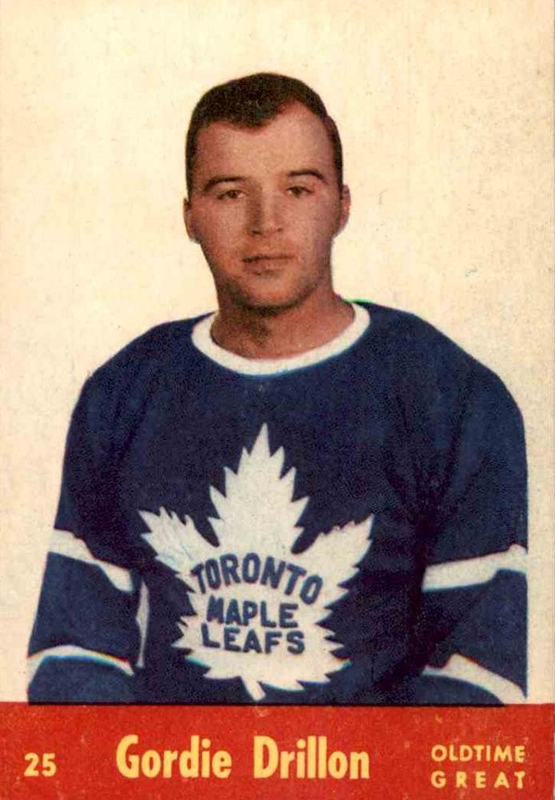
1955-56 card of Drillon from his time with Toronto Maple Leafs

Drillon played seven seasons in the NHL, six of those with Toronto and one with the Montreal Canadiens. A winger noted for his deadly accurate shot, he created a specific style of play that made him a leading scorer. Drillon's strong frame made it difficult for opposing defencemen to clear him from the front of the net. He was able to securely park himself in front of the opposing netminder to re-direct shots or pick up rebounds. This style of play would earn him a league scoring title in the 1937–38 season, to date the last a Toronto Maple Leaf player has won. Future stars such as Phil Esposito, Dino Ciccarelli, and Dave Andreychuk emulated his innovative style with great success. He scored the series-winning goal for Toronto twice.

Traded to the Montreal Canadiens for the 1943 season, Drillon finished second on the team in goals scored. At season's end, Drillon cut short his hockey career and joined the Royal Canadian Air Force, serving for the remainder of World War II. After the war, he worked as a hockey coach in Grand Falls-Windsor, Newfoundland in the 1948/49 season. Drillon later returned to his native New Brunswick where he was employed as a scout for the Maple Leafs, covering the Maritime provinces. He eventually accepted a job with the New Brunswick civil service. In 1975, he was inducted into the Hockey Hall of Fame.

Drillon died in Saint John, New Brunswick, in 1986 and was interred there in the Ocean View Memorial Gardens cemetery.

== Career statistics ==
=== Regular season and playoffs ===
			Regular season					Playoffs
Season	Team	League	GP	G	A	Pts	PIM	GP	G	A	Pts	PIM
1928–29	Aberdeen High School	HS-NB	2	0	0	0	0	—	—	—	—	—
1929–30	Moncton Chalmers Club	SNBJL	6	8	4	12	2	—	—	—	—	—
1930–31	Moncton Athletics	MarJHL	6	15	4	19	—	—	—	—	—	—
1930–31	Aberdeen High School	HS-NB	3	1	0	1	0	1	1	0	1	—
1931–32	Moncton Wheelers	MarJHL	6	6	4	10	—	3	5	1	6	5
1932–33	Moncton Hawks	MarJHL	4	13	3	16	0	2	2	1	3	4
1932–33	Moncton Swift's	MCIHL	7	11	3	14	—	6	13	4	17	—
1933–34	Toronto Young Rangers	OHA	11	20	13	33	4	2	5	3	8	4
1933–34	Toronto CCM	TMHL	2	0	1	1	0	—	—	—	—	—
1934–35	Toronto Lions	OHA	11	17	9	26	2	5	2	1	3	6
1934–35	Toronto Dominion	OHA-Sr	11	12	6	18	2	3	2	1	3	4
1935–36	Pittsburgh Yellow Jackets	EAHL	40	22	12	34	4	8	3	2	5	0
1936–37	Syracuse Stars	IAHL	7	2	3	5	2	—	—	—	—	—
1936–37	Toronto Maple Leafs	NHL	41	16	17	33	2	2	0	0	0	0
1937–38	Toronto Maple Leafs	NHL	48	26	26	52	4	7	7	1	8	2
1938–39	Toronto Maple Leafs	NHL	40	18	16	34	15	10	7	6	13	4
1939–40	Toronto Maple Leafs	NHL	43	21	19	40	13	10	3	1	4	0
1940–41	Toronto Maple Leafs	NHL	42	23	21	44	2	7	3	2	5	2
1941–42	Toronto Maple Leafs	NHL	48	23	18	41	6	9	2	3	5	2
1942–43	Montreal Canadiens	NHL	49	28	22	50	14	5	4	2	6	0
1943–44	Toronto Army Daggers	OHA-Sr	1	1	1	2	0	—	—	—	—	—
1944–45	Dartmouth RCAF	NSDHL	1	0	1	1	0	—	—	—	—	—
1944–45	Dartmouth RCAF	NSDHL	1	0	1	1	0	—	—	—	—	—
1944–45	Valleyfield Braves	QPHL	8	11	4	15	0	11	8	6	14	2
1945–46	Halifax RCAF	NSDHL	3	7	8	15	4	—	—	—	—	—
1946–47	Charlottetown Legion	NSSHL	4	10	8	18	16	11	41	12	53	4
1947–48	North Sydney Victorias	NSSHL	2	0	1	1	0	—	—	—	—	—
1948-49	Grand Falls All-Stars	NL-Sr.	—	—	—	—	—	—	—	—	—	—
1949–50	Saint John Beavers	NBSHL	69	48	24	72	40	11	1	4	5	12
NHL totals			311	155	139	294	56	50	25	15	41	10

== Awards ==
- Lady Byng Memorial Trophy (1938)
- League Scoring Champion (1938)
- First All-Star team — (1938, 1939)
- Second All-Star team — (1942)

Preceded by Dave Schriner	NHL Scoring Champion; 1938	Succeeded by Toe Blake
Preceded by Marty Barry	Winner of the Lady Byng Trophy; 1938	Succeeded by Clint Smith
