= Leo Gravelle =

Canadian ice hockey player (1925–2013)

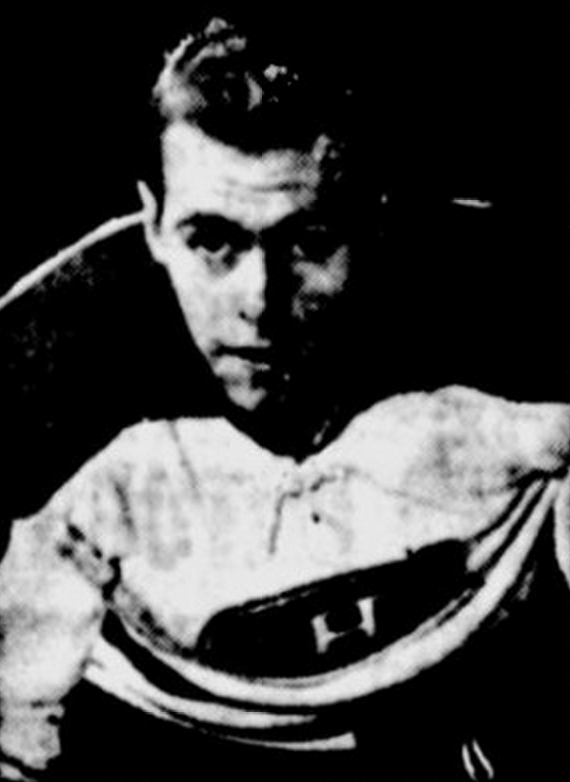
- Born: June 10, 1925 Aylmer, Quebec, Canada
- Died: October 30, 2013 (aged 88) Gatineau, Quebec, Canada
- Height: 5 ft 9 in (175 cm)
- Weight: 160 lb (73 kg; 11 st 6 lb)
- Position: Right wing
- Shot: Right
- Played for: Detroit Red Wings; Montreal Canadiens
- Playing career: 1945–1956

Joseph Léo Gérard Gravelle (June 10, 1925 – October 30, 2013) was a Canadian professional ice hockey player who played 223 games in the National Hockey League between 1946 and 1951. He played with the Detroit Red Wings and Montreal Canadiens. Gravelle was born in Aylmer, Quebec, but grew up in Port Colborne, Ontario.

Playing junior ice hockey for the Port Colborne Recreationists, Gravelle scored two goals and an assist in the final game of the 1943 Sutherland Cup championship.

He died on October 30, 2013, at age 88.

== Career statistics ==
=== Regular season and playoffs ===
			Regular season					Playoffs
Season	Team	League	GP	G	A	Pts	PIM	GP	G	A	Pts	PIM
1942–43	Port Colborne Sailors	OHA Sr	—	—	—	—	—	—	—	—	—	—
1942–43	Port Colborne Recreationists	OHA B	1	2	0	2	0	14	25	8	33	12
1942–43	Port Colborne Lions	OMHA	3	9	8	17	—	2	4	0	4	0
1943–44	Brantford Lions	OHA B	—	—	—	—	—	—	—	—	—	—
1944–45	St. Michael's Majors	OHA	17	30	22	52	6	9	12	9	21	0
1944–45	St. Michael's Majors	M-Cup	—	—	—	—	—	13	10	3	13	8
1945–46	Montreal Royals	QSHL	34	21	21	42	20	11	10	4	14	4
1946–47	Montreal Canadiens	NHL	53	16	14	30	12	6	2	0	2	2
1946–47	Montreal Royals	QSHL	2	2	2	4	0	—	—	—	—	—
1947–48	Montreal Canadiens	NHL	15	0	0	0	0	—	—	—	—	—
1947–48	Buffalo Bisons	AHL	29	11	13	24	7	—	—	—	—	—
1947–48	Houston Huskies	USHL	24	14	15	29	7	12	4	3	7	0
1948–49	Montreal Canadiens	NHL	36	4	6	10	6	7	2	1	3	0
1948–49	Buffalo Bisons	AHL	25	6	4	10	20	—	—	—	—	—
1949–50	Montreal Canadiens	NHL	70	19	10	29	18	4	0	0	0	0
1950–51	Montreal Canadiens	NHL	31	4	2	6	0	—	—	—	—	—
1950–51	Detroit Red Wings	NHL	18	1	2	3	6	—	—	—	—	—
1950–51	Indianapolis Capitals	AHL	15	4	6	10	0	—	—	—	—	—
1951–52	Ottawa Senators	QSHL	59	18	26	44	17	7	3	2	5	0
1952–53	Ottawa Senators	QSHL	60	28	28	56	4	11	2	5	7	0
1953–54	Ottawa Senators	QSHL	68	45	41	86	6	22	9	7	16	8
1954–55	Ottawa Senators	QSHL	—	—	—	—	—	—	—	—	—	—
1954–55	Chicoutimi Sagueneens	QSHL	—	13	14	27	6	7	2	1	3	0
1955–56	Montreal Royals	QSHL	42	13	12	25	11	—	—	—	—	—
NHL totals			223	44	34	78	42	17	4	1	5	2
