= Port Colborne Recreationists =

Canadian junior ice hockey team (1943–44

- City: Port Colborne, Ontario
- League: Ontario Hockey Association
- Operated: 1943 (junior B); 1943–44 (junior A)
- Home arena: Port Colborne Athletic Club

The Port Colborne Recreationists were a Canadian junior ice hockey team in the Ontario Hockey Association, based in Port Colborne, Ontario, for parts of three seasons from 1943 to 1944. The Recreationists began play at the junior B level and won the Sutherland Cup as national champions in 1943. They subsequently played at the junior A level for parts of two seasons, and were a farm team for the Buffalo Bisons in the American Hockey League.

== History ==
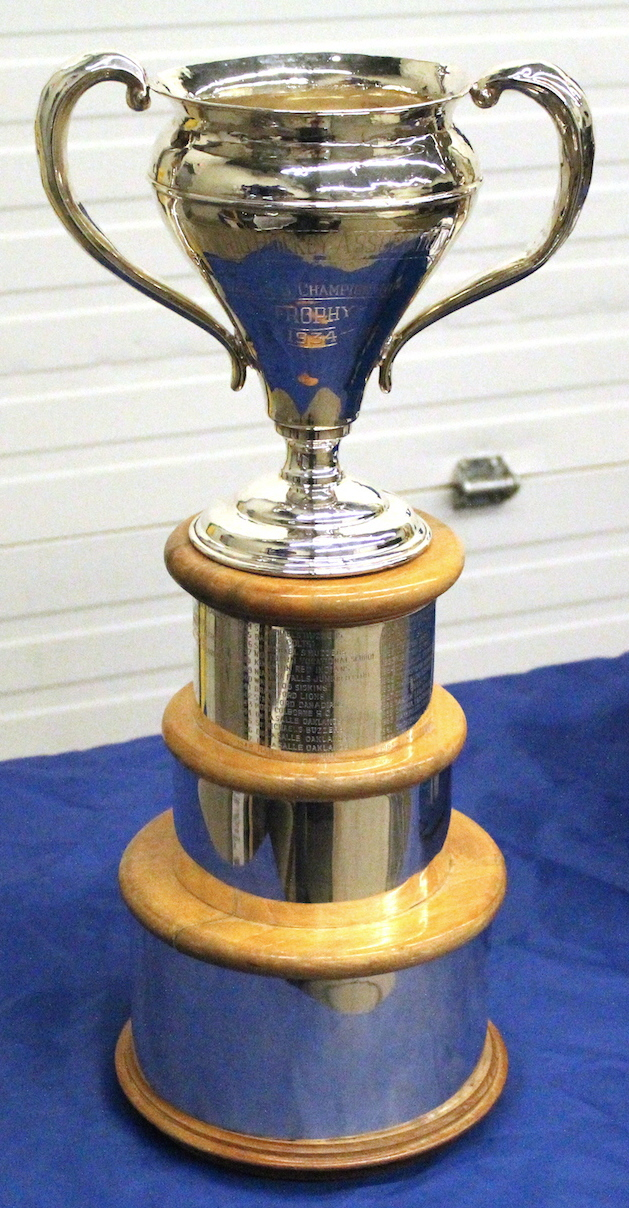
The Sutherland Cup trophy

The Recreationists were a first-year team in the Ontario Hockey Association (OHA) junior B division during the 1942–43 season, and coached by "Gooney" McGowan. The team was managed by Chuck Magee, and sponsored by Edward Magee and Richard Dwor, The Recreationists were also known as the "Iron Workers", and played home games at the Port Colborne Athletic Club, constructed in 1932 with 2,200 seats.

The Recreationists opened the season with a 14–4 victory versus the French Canadian Athletic Club of Welland. Every game of the series was played in Port Colborne since Welland had no rink. The Recreationists won the second game by an 8–6 score, then lost by a 7–6 score in game three. With a 9–1 victory in the fourth game, Port Colborne won the season series three games to one versus Welland. The Recreationists then defeated Niagara Falls team three games to one to become district champions.

The Recreationists were to play the Hamilton Buzzers in the first round of the Sutherland Cup playoffs, but the series was not played and they began instead versus Preston. Port Colborne Recreationists won the round two-games-to-one versus the Preston Siskin Bruins with a 7–2 victory in the third game, then defeated the Milverton Kists in the nexr round with consecutive victories by 4–1 and 7–4 scores. Defeating the Windsor Bruins a 19–1 score in the semifinal game, the Recreationists qualified for the Sutherland Cup final series, and hosted the first game in Port Colborne Arena. Playing the second game at Maple Leaf Gardens, the Recreationists won the Ontario junior B championship by defeating the Milton Transports by 10–3 and 7–4 scores. Leo Gravelle scored two goals and an assist in the final game.

The Recreationists arranged an unofficial all-Ontario two-game total goals series versus the Timmins Canadiens, who were junior B champions of the Northern Ontario Hockey Association, and paid travel expenses for the visiting team. Port Colborne won the first game by a 7–2 score, then won the second game by a 6–1 score. The Recreationists had eight players during the season who came from the minor ice hockey league operated by the Lions Club in Port Colborne, and won the first OHA championship for Port Colborne in 15 years.

The Recreationists were urged by OHA president Dinty Moore and secretary W. A. Hewitt to consider playing at the junior A level for the 1943–44 season. Moore noted that the junior B level did not have a national championship, and that the OHA wanted to keep the team together and would disallow transfer requests to relocate its players elsewhere. Port Colborne anticipated building on its success and agreed to moved up to junior A level. The Recreationists affiliated with the Buffalo Bisons in the American Hockey League owned by Eddie Shore, who operated a training camp for the Bisons and Recreationists to prepare new and returning players for a higher level of competition. Port Colborne lost its first game of the 1943–44 OHA junior A season to the Galt Canadians by an 8–4 score. Port Colborne won ten games during the season, placing fourth in their group and did not qualify for the playoffs.

Remaining at the junior A level for the 1944–45 OHA season, Port Colborne was placed in a group with the Galt Red Wings, Hamilton Barons, and St. Catharines Falcons. Teams were to play a double schedule within their own group, and a single schedule versus teams in the other group. Port Colborne's only victory that season was 6–4 defeat of the Toronto Marlboros on December 1. Their last game was a 5–1 loss to the Toronto Young Rangers on December 11. In seven games played, Port Colborne had one win and six losses. The Recreationists withdrew from the OHA on December 13, citing a lack of competitiveness and transportation costs.

== Notable alumni ==
Leo Gravelle played for Port Colborne from 1942 to 1944, and later played 223 games in the National Hockey League (NHL). Vern Kaiser played for Port Colborne during the 1943–44 season, and later played 50 games in the NHL.

== Season-by-season results ==
OHA junior A regular season results:

Legend: GP = Games played, W = Wins, L = Losses, T = Ties, Pts = Points, GF = Goals for, GA = Goals against

Season	Regular season									Playoffs
Season	GP	W	L	T	Pts	Pct	GF	GA	Finish	Playoffs
1943–44	26	10	16	0	20	0.385	111	126	4th Group 2	Did not qualify
1944–45	7	1	6	0	20	0.143	24	49	7th OHA	Withdrew December 13

== See also ==
- Port Colborne Sailors
