= Gilles Bilodeau =

Canadian ice hockey player

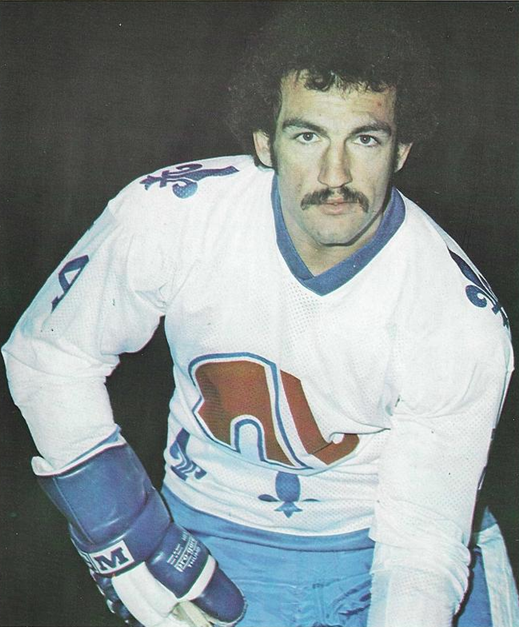
- Born: July 31, 1955 Saint-Prime, Quebec, Canada
- Died: August 12, 2008 (aged 53) Birmingham, Alabama, US
- Height: 6 ft 1 in (185 cm)
- Weight: 215 lb (98 kg; 15 st 5 lb)
- Position: Left wing
- Shot: Left
- Played for: Quebec Nordiques; Birmingham Bulls
- NHL draft: Undrafted
- WHA draft: 121st overall, 1975; Toronto Toros
- Playing career: 1975–1984

Joseph Gilles Bilodeau (July 31, 1955 – August 12, 2008) was a Canadian professional ice hockey player who played nine games in the National Hockey League and 143 games in the World Hockey Association between 1976 and 1980. He played for the Toronto Toros, Birmingham Bulls, and Quebec Nordiques. Bilodeau was nicknamed "Bad News", due to a physically aggressive style of play.

== Playing career ==
Born in Saint-Prime, Quebec, Bilodeau played junior hockey for the Sorel Black Hawks. In 1975, the Toros selected him No. 122 overall in the amateur league draft. He made his pro debut with the minor league Beauce Jaros. In his first pro season, Bilodeau led the NAHL in penalty minutes, accumulating 451 minutes in just 58 games during the 1975–76 season. The eight goals and 17 assists he recorded were the highest season totals of his career.

Finishing off the 1975–76 season with the Toros, he played 14 games in spot duty accumulating 1 assist and 38 penalty minutes. Next year the Toros transferred to Birmingham to become the Bulls. During the 1976–77 season, Bilodeau split his time with the Birmingham Bulls and the Charlotte Checkers of the SHL. With Birmingham he played 34 games while scoring 2 goals and 6 assists and picking up 133 penalty minutes. In Charlotte, he had 3 goals, 6 assists and 242 penalty minutes during 28 games. He would finish the 1977–78 season with 258 penalty minutes with the Bulls.

The Quebec Nordiques signed him as a free agent in 1978. The following season, the Nordiques were among the four WHA teams absorbed into the NHL. Bilodeau skated in nine NHL games, gaining a single assist and recording just 25 penalty minutes. He played the 1980–81 season for the Richmond Rifles of the EHL before settling in Birmingham. He played to 2 games for the Birmingham Bulls of the ACHL during the 1983–84 season before retiring.

He died on August 12, 2008, in Birmingham, Alabama.

== Career statistics ==
=== Regular season and playoffs ===
			Regular season					Playoffs
Season	Team	League	GP	G	A	Pts	PIM	GP	G	A	Pts	PIM
1974–75	Sorel Eperviers	QMJHL	62	6	9	15	377	—	—	—	—	—
1975–76	Toronto Toros	WHA	14	0	1	1	38	—	—	—	—	—
1975–76	Beauce Jaros	NAHL	58	8	17	25	451	5	0	1	1	46
1976–77	Birmingham Bulls	WHA	34	2	6	8	133	—	—	—	—	—
1976–77	Charlotte Checkers	SHL	28	3	6	9	242	—	—	—	—	—
1977–78	Birmingham Bulls	WHA	59	2	2	4	258	3	0	0	0	27
1977–78	Binghamton Dusters	AHL	4	1	2	3	7	—	—	—	—	—
1978–79	Quebec Nordiques	WHA	36	3	6	9	141	3	0	0	0	25
1978–79	Binghamton Dusters	AHL	30	2	1	3	114	—	—	—	—	—
1979–80	Quebec Nordiques	NHL	9	0	1	1	25	—	—	—	—	—
1979–80	Syracuse Firebirds	AHL	61	1	6	7	131	3	0	1	1	25
1980–81	Richmond Rifles	EHL	39	6	6	12	207	8	0	2	2	30
1983–84	Birmingham Bulls	ACHL	2	1	2	3	16	—	—	—	—	—
WHA totals			143	7	15	22	570	6	0	0	0	52
NHL totals			9	0	1	1	25	—	—	—	—	—
