= Charlie Phillips (ice hockey) =

Canadian ice hockey player

- Born: May 10, 1917; Toronto, Ontario, Canada
- Died: March 25, 2005 (aged 87); Moncton, New Brunswick, Canada
- Height: 5 ft 11 in (180 cm)
- Weight: 200 lb (91 kg; 14 st 4 lb)
- Position: Defence
- Shot: Left
- Played for: Montreal Canadiens
- Playing career: 1937–1952

Charles Edward "Red" Phillips (May 10, 1917 – March 29, 2005) was a Canadian professional ice hockey defenceman. He played 17 games in the National Hockey League for the Montreal Canadiens during the 1942–43 season. The rest of his career, which lasted from 1937 to 1952, was spent in the minor and senior leagues. He was born in Toronto, Ontario.

== Career statistics ==
=== Regular season and playoffs ===
			Regular season					Playoffs
Season	Team	League	GP	G	A	Pts	PIM	GP	G	A	Pts	PIM
1935–36	Toronto Young Rangers	OHA	—	—	—	—	—	—	—	—	—	—
1936–37	Toronto Lions	OHA-B	12	8	2	10	14	—	—	—	—	—
1937–38	Moncton Maroons	SNBHL	29	24	9	33	90	3	1	0	1	8
1937–38	Moncton Maroons	Al-Cup	—	—	—	—	—	8	8	3	11	29
1938–39	Saint John Beavers	Exhib	34	16	16	32	60	—	—	—	—	—
1938–39	Saint John Beavers	Al-Cup	—	—	—	—	—	13	7	9	16	20
1939–40	Glace Bay Miners	CBSHL	40	8	7	15	33	4	1	0	1	2
1940–41	Glace Bay Miners	CBSHL	43	6	14	20	51	4	1	0	1	10
1941–42	Glace Bay Miners	CBSHL	40	29	33	62	97	7	6	5	11	18
1942–43	Montreal Canadiens	NHL	17	0	0	0	6	—	—	—	—	—
1942–43	Washington Lions	AHL	10	5	3	8	14	—	—	—	—	—
1943–44	Kingston Army	OHA Sr	14	1	5	6	17	—	—	—	—	—
1944–45	Providence Reds	AHL	4	0	0	0	0	—	—	—	—	—
1945–46	Lachine Rapides	QPHL	3	0	0	0	0	4	2	2	4	2
1946–47	Montreal Royals	QSHL	1	0	0	0	0	—	—	—	—	—
1946–47	Lachine Rapides	QPHL	14	4	4	8	4	—	—	—	—	—
1946–47	Washington Lions	EAHL	13	9	7	16	21	9	4	3	7	9
1947–48	Glace Bay Miners	CBSHL	47	17	17	34	105	4	2	1	3	4
1947–48	Moncton Hawks	MMHL	—	—	—	—	—	1	1	0	1	0
1948–49	Saint John Beavers	MSHL	48	20	20	40	57	7	2	0	2	4
1949–50	Glace Bay Miners	CBSHL	66	11	29	40	31	10	1	3	4	6
1950–51	Moncton Hawks	MMHL	19	5	2	7	4	—	—	—	—	—
1950–51	Kentville Wildcats	NSAPC	—	—	—	—	—	—	—	—	—	—
1951–52	Dieppe Goats	MCIHL	—	—	—	—	—	—	—	—	—	—
CBSHL totals			238	71	100	171	317	29	11	9	20	40
NHL totals			17	0	0	0	6	—	—	—	—	—
