= Jack Valiquette =

Canadian ice hockey player

- Born: March 18, 1956 (age 70) St. Thomas, Ontario, Canada
- Height: 6 ft 2 in (188 cm)
- Weight: 195 lb (88 kg; 13 st 13 lb)
- Position: Forward
- Shot: Left
- Played for: Toronto Maple Leafs; Colorado Rockies
- NHL draft: 13th overall, 1974; Toronto Maple Leafs
- Playing career: 1974–1981

John Joseph Valiquette (born March 18, 1956) is a Canadian retired ice hockey forward.

Valiquette was born in St. Thomas, Ontario. He started his National Hockey League career with the Toronto Maple Leafs in 1974. He also played for the Colorado Rockies. He retired after the 1980-81 season, after a seven-year career.

== Career statistics ==
			Regular season					Playoffs
Season	Team	League	GP	G	A	Pts	PIM	GP	G	A	Pts	PIM
1971–72	Laurentian University	OUA	3	0	3	3	6	—	—	—	—	—
1972–73	St. Marys Lincolns	WOHL	42	47	41	88	25	—	—	—	—	—
1973–74	Sault Ste. Marie Greyhounds	OHA-Jr.	69	63	72	135	38	—	—	—	—	—
1974–75	Toronto Maple Leafs	NHL	1	0	0	0	0	—	—	—	—	—
1974–75	Oklahoma City Blazers	CHL	76	22	51	73	52	5	0	1	1	0
1975–76	Toronto Maple Leafs	NHL	45	10	23	33	30	10	2	3	5	2
1975–76	Oklahoma City Blazers	CHL	32	15	8	23	25	—	—	—	—	—
1976–77	Toronto Maple Leafs	NHL	66	15	30	45	7	—	—	—	—	—
1977–78	Toronto Maple Leafs	NHL	60	8	13	21	15	13	1	3	4	2
1977–78	Tulsa Oilers	CHL	7	7	5	12	2	—	—	—	—	—
1978–79	Colorado Rockies	NHL	76	23	34	57	12	—	—	—	—	—
1979–80	Colorado Rockies	NHL	77	25	25	50	8	—	—	—	—	—
1980–81	Colorado Rockies	NHL	25	3	9	12	7	—	—	—	—	—
1980–81	Fort Worth Texans	CHL	37	18	18	36	4	—	—	—	—	—
NHL totals			350	84	134	218	79	23	3	6	9	4
CHL totals			152	62	82	144	83	5	0	1	1	0

Preceded by Ian Turnbull	Toronto Maple Leafs first-round draft pick 1974	Succeeded by Don Ashby
