= Jocelyn Guevremont =

Canadian ice hockey player (born 1951)

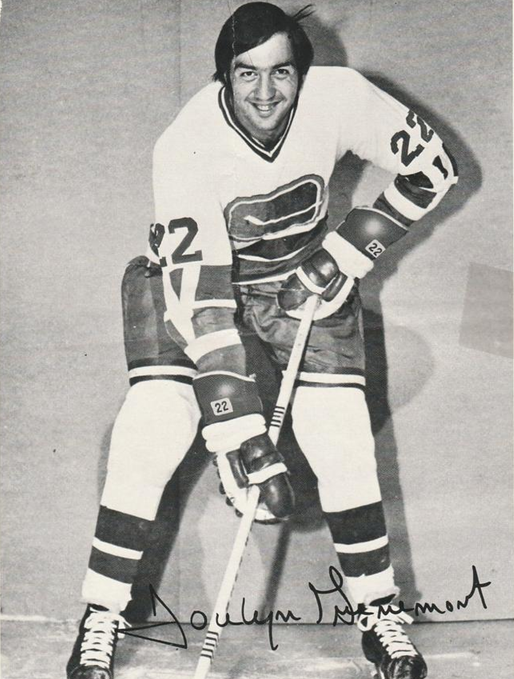
- Born: March 1, 1951 (age 75) Montreal, Quebec, Canada
- Height: 6 ft 2 in (188 cm)
- Weight: 200 lb (91 kg; 14 st 4 lb)
- Position: Defence
- Shot: Right
- Played for: Vancouver Canucks; Buffalo Sabres; New York Rangers
- National team: Canada
- NHL draft: 3rd overall, 1971; Vancouver Canucks
- Playing career: 1971–1980

Jocelyn Marcel Guèvremont (born March 1, 1951) is a Canadian former professional ice hockey defenceman. He played nine seasons in the National Hockey League (NHL) with the Vancouver Canucks, Buffalo Sabres, and New York Rangers. from 1971 to 1980. With the Sabres he played in the 1975 Stanley Cup Finals.

He began his career as a distinguished junior ice hockey player with the Montreal Junior Canadiens, named to the Ontario Hockey Association (OHA) Second and First All-Star Teams in consecutive years and was awarded the Max Kaminsky Trophy in 1971 as the most outstanding defenceman in the OHA. He also won the 1969 and 1970 Memorial Cup. Drafted in the first round, third overall by Vancouver in the 1971 NHL Amateur Draft, Guèvremont was traded to Buffalo in 1974, and then to New York in 1979. After his playing career he served as a coach in the junior level, spending time in both the Quebec Major Junior Hockey League and Ontario Hockey League.

== Playing career ==
In his NHL career he played for the Vancouver Canucks, Buffalo Sabres, and New York Rangers and retired in 1980 due to chronic shoulder problems. He was also a member of Team Canada at the 1972 Summit Series but did not play. As a Buffalo Sabre he was often the only defenceman on the powerplay due to their depth at right wing, which pushed Rene Robert back to the other point while Danny Gare lined up on the wing along with Gilbert Perreault and Rick Martin. Although he was not a big goal scorer his hard slap shot resulted in many tip goals on the power play. At full strength he often was paired with Bill Hajt.

== Awards ==
- 1970 – OHA Second All-Star Team
- 1971 – OHA First All-Star Team
- 1971 – Max Kaminsky Trophy
- 1974 – Played in NHL All-Star Game

== Career statistics ==
=== Regular season and playoffs ===
			Regular season					Playoffs
Season	Team	League	GP	G	A	Pts	PIM	GP	G	A	Pts	PIM
1967–68	Laval Saints	QJHL	50	10	20	30	—	—	—	—	—	—
1968–69	Montreal Junior Canadiens	OHA	54	11	40	51	79	14	6	21	27	6
1968–69	Montreal Junior Canadiens	MC	—	—	—	—	—	8	2	5	7	6
1969–70	Montreal Junior Canadiens	OHA	54	13	45	58	46	16	5	21	26	18
1969–70	Montreal Junior Canadiens	MC	—	—	—	—	—	12	4	24	28	10
1970–71	Montreal Junior Canadiens	OHA	60	22	66	88	112	11	7	13	20	26
1971–72	Vancouver Canucks	NHL	75	13	38	51	44	—	—	—	—	—
1972–73	Vancouver Canucks	NHL	78	16	26	42	46	—	—	—	—	—
1973–74	Vancouver Canucks	NHL	72	15	24	39	34	—	—	—	—	—
1974–75	Vancouver Canucks	NHL	2	0	0	0	0	—	—	—	—	—
1974–75	Buffalo Sabres	NHL	64	7	25	32	32	17	0	6	6	14
1975–76	Buffalo Sabres	NHL	80	12	40	52	57	9	0	5	5	2
1976–77	Buffalo Sabres	NHL	80	9	29	38	46	6	3	4	7	0
1977–78	Buffalo Sabres	NHL	66	7	28	35	46	8	1	2	3	2
1978–79	Buffalo Sabres	NHL	34	3	8	11	8	—	—	—	—	—
1979–80	New York Rangers	NHL	20	2	5	7	6	—	—	—	—	—
1979–80	New Haven Nighthawks	AHL	36	7	27	34	18	10	0	10	10	10
NHL totals			571	84	223	307	319	40	4	17	21	18

== Coaching record ==
Team	Year	Regular season						Postseason			
Team	Year	G	W	L	T	Pts	Finish	W	L	Win %	Result
Drummondville Voltigeurs	1982–83	19	6	13	0	12	(fired)	—	—	—	—
Drummonvdille Voltigeurs total		19	6	13	0	12	—	—	—	—	—
Cornwall Royals	1982–83	—	—	—	—	—	—	—	—	—	—
Cornwall Royals	1983–84	70	33	37	0	66	6th in Leyden	0	3	.000	Lost in First round
Cornwall Royals total		70	33	37	0	—		0	3	.000	—

Preceded by Dale Tallon	Vancouver Canucks first-round draft pick 1971	Succeeded by Don Lever
