= Don Smillie =

Canadian ice hockey player

- Born: September 13, 1910 Toronto, Ontario, Canada
- Died: June 15, 1993 (aged 82)
- Height: 6 ft 0 in (183 cm)
- Weight: 185 lb (84 kg; 13 st 3 lb)
- Position: Left Wing
- Shot: Left
- Played for: Boston Bruins
- Playing career: 1933–1936

Donald William Winter Smillie (September 13, 1910 — June 15, 1993) was a professional ice hockey player who played twelve games in the National Hockey League with the Boston Bruins during the 1933–34 season. The rest of his career, which lasted from 1933 to 1936, was spent in various minor leagues.

Smillie got the first of his two NHL goals on March 6, 1934, in Boston's 7–3 win over Toronto.

== Career statistics ==
=== Regular season and playoffs ===
			Regular season					Playoffs
Season	Team	League	GP	G	A	Pts	PIM	GP	G	A	Pts	PIM
1928–29	Toronto Young Rangers	OHA	12	10	0	10	—	4	1	0	1	—
1928–29	Toronto Young Rangers	M-Cup	—	—	—	—	—	5	5	1	6	—
1929–30	University of Toronto	CIAUC	9	6	0	6	10	3	1	0	1	0
1930–31	University of Toronto	CIAUC	10	1	2	3	16	—	—	—	—	—
1931–32	University of Toronto	CIAUC	12	4	3	7	18	—	—	—	—	—
1932–33	University of Toronto	CIAUC	11	5	3	8	16	—	—	—	—	—
1932–33	Toronto City Services	TMHL	1	0	0	0	0	—	—	—	—	—
1933–34	Boston Bruins	NHL	12	2	2	2	4	—	—	—	—	—
1933–34	Boston Tiger Cubs	Can-Am	15	1	2	3	11	—	—	—	—	—
1933–34	Toronto Red Indians	TMHL	4	3	1	4	0	—	—	—	—	—
1933–34	Toronto Nationals	OHA Sr	11	3	1	4	14	—	—	—	—	—
1934–35	Boston Tiger Cubs	Can-Am	6	0	1	1	4	—	—	—	—	—
1934–35	Syracuse Stars	IHL	9	0	2	2	4	—	—	—	—	—
1934–35	Windsor Bulldogs	IHL	25	8	2	10	12	—	—	—	—	—
1935–36	Windsor Bulldogs	IHL	26	6	9	15	19	8	1	0	1	7
1935–36	St. Louis Flyers	AHA	3	0	0	0	0	—	—	—	—	—
1935–36	London Tecumsehs	IHL	20	3	3	6	14	—	—	—	—	—
IHL totals			80	17	16	33	49	8	1	0	1	7
NHL totals			12	2	2	4	4	—	—	—	—	—
