= Ian Turnbull (ice hockey) =

Canadian ice hockey player

- Born: December 22, 1953 (age 72) Montreal, Quebec, Canada
- Height: 6 ft 0 in (183 cm)
- Weight: 200 lb (91 kg; 14 st 4 lb)
- Position: Defence
- Shot: Left
- Played for: Toronto Maple Leafs; Los Angeles Kings; Pittsburgh Penguins
- NHL draft: 15th overall, 1973; Toronto Maple Leafs
- WHA draft: 70th overall, 1973; Vancouver Blazers
- Playing career: 1973–1983

Ian "Bull" Turnbull (born December 22, 1953) is a Canadian former professional ice hockey defenceman who played ten seasons in the National Hockey League from 1973–74 until 1982–83. He and Börje Salming combined to make one of the best 1–2 defensive punches in Toronto Maple Leafs history during the 1970s.

== Career Overview ==
Turnbull played 628 career NHL games, scoring 123 goals and 317 assists for 440 points. In his best offensive season, (1976–77 while with the Maple Leafs), he set career highs with 22 goals, 57 assists, 79 points, and a +47 plus/minus rating. The 79 points still stands over 40 years later as the Maple Leaf team record for most points in a season by a defenceman. He also still holds the NHL record for most goals in a game by a defenceman, with 5 in a game on February 2, 1977, in a 9–1 victory against the Detroit Red Wings. Turnbull only had five shots in the game, making him the first player in NHL history to score five goals on five shots. Turnbull was outstanding in the 1978 playoff series against the New York Islanders, eventually won by Toronto 4 games to 3, anchoring the team’s defensive corps after an eye injury forced all-star defenceman Börje Salming out of the Maple Leafs line-up.

Early in the 1981-82 season, Turnbull was traded to the Los Angeles Kings in exchange for veteran forward Billy Harris and defenseman John Gibson. Turnbull's time with the Kings was brief, playing just 42-games, but one of them was quite memorable. On December 12, 1981, Turnbull scored four goals in a 7–5 Kings victory over the Vancouver Canucks.

Turnbull joined the Penguins for the 1982-83 season but played just six games for them before a back injury forced him out of the lineup and into retirement.

Turnbull was the IT Director at Martin Chevrolet in Torrance, California, United States, until he retired in 2022.

== Career statistics ==
			Regular season					Playoffs
Season	Team	League	GP	G	A	Pts	PIM	GP	G	A	Pts	PIM
1968–69	West Island Flyers	MMJHL	25	16	7	23	—	—	—	—	—	—
1969–70	Montreal Jr. Canadiens	OHA-Jr.	53	4	21	25	88	16	3	3	6	8
1969–70	Montreal Jr. Canadiens	MC	—	—	—	—	—	6	6	4	10	6
1970–71	Montreal Jr. Canadiens	OHA-Jr.	59	17	45	62	85	11	3	8	11	6
1971–72	Montreal Jr. Canadiens	OHA-Jr.	63	34	48	82	85	—	—	—	—	—
1972–73	Ottawa 67's	OHA-Jr.	60	31	50	81	98	9	6	11	17	8
1973–74	Toronto Maple Leafs	NHL	78	8	27	35	74	4	0	0	0	8
1974–75	Oklahoma City Blazers	CHL	8	2	1	3	15	—	—	—	—	—
1974–75	Toronto Maple Leafs	NHL	22	6	7	13	44	7	0	2	2	4
1975–76	Toronto Maple Leafs	NHL	76	20	36	56	90	10	2	9	11	29
1976–77	Toronto Maple Leafs	NHL	80	22	57	79	84	9	4	4	8	10
1977–78	Toronto Maple Leafs	NHL	77	14	47	61	77	13	6	10	16	10
1978–79	Toronto Maple Leafs	NHL	80	12	51	63	80	6	0	4	4	27
1979–80	Toronto Maple Leafs	NHL	75	11	28	39	90	3	0	3	3	2
1980–81	Toronto Maple Leafs	NHL	80	19	47	66	104	3	1	0	1	4
1981–82	Toronto Maple Leafs	NHL	12	0	2	2	8	—	—	—	—	—
1981–82	Los Angeles Kings	NHL	42	11	15	26	81	—	—	—	—	—
1981–82	New Haven Nighthawks	AHL	13	1	7	8	4	3	0	0	0	0
1982–83	Baltimore Skipjacks	AHL	13	3	8	11	10	—	—	—	—	—
1982–83	Pittsburgh Penguins	NHL	6	0	0	0	4	—	—	—	—	—
NHL totals			628	123	317	440	736	55	13	32	45	94

== Honors and awards ==
- OHA-Jr 2nd All-Star Team: 1972, 1973
- NHL All-Star Game: 1977
- 2018 J. P. Bickell Memorial Award

== See also ==
- List of players with 5 or more goals in an NHL game

Preceded by Bob Neely	Toronto Maple Leafs first-round draft pick 1973	Succeeded by Jack Valiquette
