= Unionville Seaforths =

Canadian junior ice hockey team (1951–1962)

- City: Unionville, Ontario
- League: Metro Junior A
- Operated: 1961-1962
- Home arena: Crosby Memorial Arena
- Head coach: Peanuts O'Flaherty

Franchise history
- 1961-1962: Unionville Seaforths
- 1962-1963: Toronto Knob Hill Farms

The Unionville Seaforths were a junior ice hockey team that played in the now defunct Metro Junior A League for one season, in 1961-62. Unionville were previously a Junior B team, going by the name of the Unionville Jets, prior to being promoted to the new league in 1961.

Cliff Simpson and Peanuts O'Flaherty shared the team's coaching duties. The team finished in last place, one point behind the Brampton 7Ups. Wayne Carleton was their only alumnus to play in the National Hockey League, but was a more prolific scorer after switching to the World Hockey Association.

After a poor first season in the tiny bandbox arena in Unionville, the Seaforths moved to downtown Toronto, becoming the Toronto Knob Hill Farms.

== Season-by-season results ==
Season	Games	Won	Lost	Tied	Points	Pct %	Goals For	Goals Against	Standing
1951–52	20	7	12	1	15	0.375	92	122	4th Metro B
1952–53	30	14	15	1	29	0.483	123	146	3rd Metro B
1953–54	32	14	17	1	29	0.453	116	112	6th Metro B
did not play (1954–1958)
1958–59	28	5	22	1	11	0.196	89	190	8th Metro B
1959–60	28	9	13	6	24	0.429	119	121	6th Metro B
1960–61	27	17	6	4	38	0.704	132	77	2nd Metro B
1961–62	36	10	21	5	25	0.347	133	157	5th Metro Jr. A
