= Birmingham Bulls (ACHL) =

- City: Birmingham, Alabama
- League: Atlantic Coast Hockey League
- Founded: 1983
- Operated: 1983–84
- Home arena: Birmingham-Jefferson Civic Center
- Owner: Mike McClure
- General manager: Jim Troy
- Head coach: David Hanson

The Birmingham Bulls was a professional ice hockey team based in Birmingham, Alabama, that briefly played in the Atlantic Coast Hockey League (ACHL) in October 1983. Their home ice was the former Birmingham-Jefferson Civic Center (now Birmingham Jefferson Convention Complex) (BJCC)

== History ==
On July 28, 1983, owner and team president Mike McClure made the announcement that the team was joining the Atlantic Coast Hockey League. The team was looking to use the South Stars name, but on August 13, 1983, an announcement was made that they lost the rights to the name. Instead, McClure opted to use the Birmingham Bulls name.

Before the team took the ice, McClure admitted that "the future of the Bulls depends on the rental contract that they received from the BJCC." BJCC Director Casey Jones estimated that ice making would cost approximately $400 per day". and that "it's an expensive procedure, but we want hockey."

=== Coaching ===
Dave Hanson had previously played with the Bulls while they were part of the World Hockey Association (WHA) (1977–79) and the Central Hockey League (CHL) (1979–80). Going into the 1983-84 season, Hanson had expected to go to training camp with the New York Islanders with the plan of eventually being assigned to the Indianapolis Checkers. But after Checkers' head coach Fred Creighton did not return any calls and the season soon approaching, Hanson was starting to question his options. Creighton told Hanson that there weren't any available possibilities in the Islanders' organization because general manager Bill Torrey had assigned a group of newer players to Indianapolis and he was not willing to make any changes for Hanson. Creighton told Hanson to go to Birmingham, stay in shape and be ready in the event of a recall. In the meantime, team owner Mike McClure (who Hanson knew from his time with the WHA Birmingham Bulls) contacted Hanson and inquired if he would be interested in coaching his new ACHL franchise. Hanson said that "he was looking to get into coaching" and former Bulls' coach Glen Sonmor said that Carlson "had a good character for it." On September 12, 1983, Hanson was announced as the Bulls' head coach.

== Eviction and folding ==
On October 14, while the team was playing their first preseason game in Nashville, they were evicted from the Birmingham Jefferson Convention Complex as a result of being unable to pay the $50,000 rental fee they owed. Despite owing money, the Bulls moved forward and had scheduled to play their season opener. The deadline was extended by a week. At one point, the team had an anonymous donor who was willing to pay the $50,000 that was owed to the Birmingham Jefferson Convention Complex. On October 25, 1983, the donor withdrew their money and the Bulls were unable to provide the money owed to BJCC.

Several attempts were made to secure funding after the anonymous donor withdrew their commitment due to a local newspaper writing a critical article that was directed at the team's phantom owner. Birmingham Stallions owner Marvin Warner and actor Paul Newman, who Carlson had worked with in the movie Slap Shot were contacted for financing, but calls were not returned.

On October 28, 1983, as a result of ownership never paying the ACHL franchise fee along with the arena deposit, the ACHL suspended operations of the Birmingham Bulls. Their final regular season record was two victories and one loss. Coach Hanson resumed his playing career, joining the Toledo Goaldiggers. The remaining players were dispersed throughout the ACHL.

The Birmingham Bulls' name would remain dormant until 1992, when another franchise by the same name would join the East Coast Hockey League (now ECHL).

== Players ==
Several Bulls' players were former NHL and WHA draft picks and/or have played in their respective leagues.

Player	Position	Year	League Drafted	Round	Selection	Drafted by	NHL/WHA Teams Played For	GP	Scoring	Additional notes
Paul O'Neil	Center	1973 1973	NHL WHA	5th round 5th round	67th overall 61st overall	Vancouver Canucks Houston Aeros	Vancouver Canucks (NHL) (1973–74); Boston Bruins (NHL) (1975–76); Birmingham Bulls (WHA) (1978–79)	5; 1; 1	0G 0A 0PTS; 0G 0A 0PTS; 0G 0A 0PTS	Finished 1983-84 ACHL season with Virginia Lancers
Gilles Bilodeau	Left Wing	1973	WHA	9th round	121st overall	Toronto Toros	Toronto Toros (WHA) (1975–76); Birmingham Bulls (WHA) (1976–78); Quebec Nordiques (WHA) (1978–79); Quebec Nordiques (NHL) (1979–80)	14; 93; 36; 9	0G 1A 1PTS; 4G 8A 12PTS; 3G 6A 9PTS; 0G 1A 1PTS	
Paul Evans	Right Wing	1975; 1975	NHL; WHA	9th round 13th round	149th overall 162nd overall	Toronto Maple Leafs; Indianapolis Racers	Toronto Maple Leafs (NHL) (1976–78)	11	1G 1A 2PTS	
Paul Joswiak	Goalie	1978	NHL	9th round	152nd overall	New York Islanders	--	--	--	Finished 1983-84 ACHL season with Virginia Lancers
Darre Switzer	Left Wing	1978	NHL	8th round	134th overall	Philadelphia Flyers	--	--	--	Finished 1983-84 ACHL season with Carolina Thunderbirds
Jim Turkiewicz	Defense	1974; 1975	WHA; NHL	1st round 5th round	12th overall 134th overall	Toronto Toros; Montreal Canadiens	Toronto Toros (WHA) (1974–76); Birmingham Bulls (WHA) (1976–79)	155; 237	13G 56A 69PTS; 12G 63A 75PTS	Jim's brother Ron also played on the Bulls as a right winger
Dave Hanson	Coach	1974	WHA	4th round	59th overall	Minnesota Fighting Saints	Minnesota Fighting Saints (WHA) (1976–77); New England Whalers (WHA) (1976–77); Birmingham Bulls (WHA) (1977–79); Detroit Red Wings (NHL) (1978–79); Minnesota North Stars (NHL) (1979–80)	7; 1; 95; 11; 22	0G 2A 2PTS; 0G 0A 0PTS; 7G 16A 23PTS; 0G 0A 0PTS; 1G 1A 2PTS	Hanson previously won championships as a player with the Johnstown Jets (Lockhart Cup, 1975–76) and an Adams Cup with the Indianapolis Checkers the season before he assumed the role of head coach with the Bulls. Hanson was also well-known for his role as Jack Hanson in the movie Slap Shot. The Bulls are the only team that Hanson ever coached professionally.

== Schedule ==
=== Pre-season ===
- October 14, 1983 @ Nashville South Stars, 5-4 (Win)
- October 18, 1983 @ Nashville South Stars, 7-2 (Win)

=== Regular season ===
- October 22, 1983 @ Nashville South Stars, 2-5 (Loss)
- October 25, 1983 vs Mohawk Valley Stars, 8-0 (Win)
- October 27, 1983 vs Mohawk Valley Stars 7-3 (Win)

October 28, 1983 - Birmingham Bulls franchise folds

Preceded by Birmingham South Stars	Pro Hockey in Birmingham; 1983	Succeeded by Birmingham Bulls (ECHL)
