= Jim Turkiewicz =

Canadian ice hockey player (born 1955)

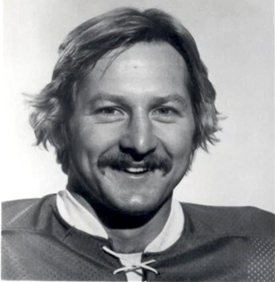
- Turkiewicz in 1978 headshot
- Born: April 13, 1955 (age 71) Hamilton, Ontario, Canada
- Height: 5 ft 10 in (178 cm)
- Weight: 185 lb (84 kg; 13 st 3 lb)
- Position: Defence
- Shot: Left
- Played for: Toronto Toros; Birmingham Bulls
- NHL draft: 88th overall, 1975; Montreal Canadiens
- WHA draft: 12th overall, 1974; Toronto Toros
- Playing career: 1974–1984

James Turkiewicz (born April 13, 1955) is a Canadian former professional ice hockey player.

Turkiewicz played 392 games in the World Hockey Association. He played for the Toronto Toros and Birmingham Bulls.

== Career statistics ==
			Regular season					Playoffs
Season	Team	League	GP	G	A	Pts	PIM	GP	G	A	Pts	PIM
1971–72	Peterborough Petes	OHA-Jr.	63	5	16	21	46	—	—	—	—	—
1972–73	Peterborough Petes	OHA-Jr.	63	6	36	42	72	—	—	—	—	—
1973–74	Peterborough Petes	OHA-Jr.	69	20	41	61	91	—	—	—	—	—
1974–75	Peterborough Petes	OMJHL	69	20	41	61	91	—	—	—	—	—
1974–75	Toronto Toros	WHA	78	3	27	30	28	6	0	2	2	0
1975–76	Toronto Toros	WHA	77	10	29	39	55	—	—	—	—	—
1976–77	Birmingham Bulls	WHA	80	6	25	31	54	—	—	—	—	—
1977–78	Birmingham Bulls	WHA	78	3	21	24	45	5	1	1	2	0
1978–79	Birmingham Bulls	WHA	79	3	17	20	52	—	—	—	—	—
1979–80	Rochester Americans	AHL	53	3	8	11	32	4	0	1	1	4
1980–81	Springfield Indians	AHL	72	8	15	23	66	7	0	6	6	34
1982–83	Birmingham South Stars	CHL	2	0	0	0	0	—	—	—	—	—
1983–84	Birmingham Bulls	ACHL	2	1	1	2	0	—	—	—	—	—
1984–85	Flamboro Mott's Clamato's	OHA-Sr.	27	4	18	22	51	—	—	—	—	—
1985–86	Flamboro Mott's Clamatos	OHA-Sr.	28	2	16	18	50	—	—	—	—	—
WHA totals			392	25	119	144	234	11	1	3	4	0
