= Toronto Knob Hill Farms =

Junior ice hockey team

- City: Toronto, Ontario
- League: Metro Junior A
- Operated: 1962–1963
- Home arena: Maple Leaf Gardens
- Head coach: Peanuts O'Flaherty

Franchise history
- 1961–1962: Unionville Seaforths
- 1962–1963: Toronto Knob Hill Farms

Toronto Knob Hill Farms were a junior ice hockey team who played the Metro Junior A League during the 1962–63 season. Formerly the Unionville Seaforths, the team moved to downtown Toronto for the league's second season, becoming associated with grocery retailer Knob Hill Farms.

The team folded along with the league in 1963. The head coach, returning from the previous season, was Johnny "Peanuts" O'Flaherty.

== Season-by-season results ==
Season	Games	Won	Lost	Tied	Points	Pct %	Goals For	Goals Against	Standing
1961–62	36	10	21	5	25	0.347	133	157	5th Metro Jr. A
1962–63	40	14	20	6	34	0.425	121	154	3rd Metro Jr. A
