= Bruce Draper =

Canadian ice hockey player

- Born: October 2, 1940 Toronto, Ontario, Canada
- Died: January 26, 1968 (aged 27)
- Height: 5 ft 10 in (178 cm)
- Weight: 157 lb (71 kg; 11 st 3 lb)
- Position: Centre
- Shot: Left
- Played for: Toronto Maple Leafs
- Playing career: 1961–1966

Bruce Alexander Draper (October 2, 1940 — January 26, 1968) was a Canadian professional ice hockey centre who played in one National Hockey League game for the Toronto Maple Leafs during the 1962–63 NHL season.

== Career statistics ==
=== Regular season and playoffs ===
			Regular season					Playoffs
Season	Team	League	GP	G	A	Pts	PIM	GP	G	A	Pts	PIM
1957–58	St. Michael's Buzzers	MJBHL	—	—	—	—	—	—	—	—	—	—
1957–58	St. Michael's Majors	OHA	2	0	0	0	2	—	—	—	—	—
1958–59	St. Michael's Majors	OHA	48	24	25	49	58	15	5	7	12	24
1959–60	St. Michael's Majors	OHA	38	16	22	38	23	10	6	6	12	10
1960–61	St. Michael's Majors	OHA	46	44	33	77	77	19	10	16	26	18
1960–61	St. Michael's Majors	M-Cup	—	—	—	—	—	9	5	7	12	2
1961–62	Rochester Americans	AHL	70	25	40	65	31	2	0	0	0	0
1962–63	Toronto Maple Leafs	NHL	1	0	0	0	0	—	—	—	—	—
1962–63	Sudbury Wolves	EPHL	11	3	10	13	10	—	—	—	—	—
1962–63	Rochester Americans	AHL	55	8	18	26	12	2	0	1	1	0
1963–64	Denver Invaders	WHL	68	15	30	45	30	6	0	3	3	0
1964–65	Hershey Bears	AHL	42	12	20	32	10	15	7	3	10	6
1965–66	Hershey Bears	AHL	41	14	21	35	49	—	—	—	—	—
1966–67	Hershey Bears	AHL	2	1	0	1	0	—	—	—	—	—
AHL totals			210	60	99	159	102	19	7	4	11	6
NHL totals			1	0	0	0	0	—	—	—	—	—

== See also ==
- List of players who played only one game in the NHL
