= Toronto Native Sons =

Canadian junior ice hockey team (1930–1942)

- City: Toronto, Ontario, Canada
- League: Ontario Hockey Association
- Operated: 1928 to 1942
- Home arena: Maple Leaf Gardens

The Toronto Native Sons were a Canadian junior ice hockey team in the Ontario Hockey Association (OHA) from 1928 until 1942. They played home games at Maple Leaf Gardens in Toronto. Prior to 1930, the team played in the Toronto Hockey League. The Native Sons were finalists for the J. Ross Robertson Cup during the 1938–39 OHA season, losing in three games to the Oshawa Generals.

Five alumni of the Native Sons graduated to play in the National Hockey League; including George Parsons (1930–31), Red Heron (1933–34), Chick Webster (1937–1940), Hockey Hall of Fame inductee Bill Quackenbush (1940–41), and Al Dewsbury (1941–42).

== Season-by-season results ==
Regular season and playoffs results:

Legend: GP = Games played, W = Wins, L = Losses, T = Ties, Pts = Points, GF = Goals for, GA = Goals against

Memorial Cup champions	League champions	League finalists

Season	Regular season									Playoffs
Season	GP	W	L	T	Pts	Pct	GF	GA	Finish	Playoffs
1930–31	9	6	3	0	12	0.667	28	25	2nd Group 6	Lost group final (West Toronto Nationals) 5–1
1931–32	9	4	5	0	8	0.444	18	21	3rd Group 6	Lost second-place tiebreaker (North Toronto) 1–0
1932–33	8	7	1	0	14	0.875	41	22	1st Group 3	Lost group final (Oshawa Blue Imps) 6–5
1933–34	12	5	6	1	11	0.458	57	58	4th Group 7	Did not qualify
1934–35	9	0	9	0	0	0.000	15	73	5th Group 1	Did not qualify
1935–36	10	6	4	0	12	0.600	28	29	3rd Group 1	Lost semifinal (Toronto St. Michael's Majors) 9–6
1936–37	12	1	11	0	2	0.083	18	75	7th Group 1	Did not qualify
1937–38	12	5	7	0	10	0.417	45	44	5th OHA	Did not qualify
1938–39	14	7	6	1	15	0.536	53	45	3rd Group 2	Won quarterfinal (Toronto Marlboros) 2–0; Won semifinal (Toronto Young Rangers) 2–1; Lost OHA final (Oshawa Generals) 3–0
1939–40	20	4	15	1	9	0.225	48	113	5th OHA	Did not qualify
1940–41	15	0	15	0	0	0.000	52	147	5th OHA	Did not qualify
1941–42	24	0	24	0	0	0.000	43	120	7th OHA	Did not qualify
