= Toronto Young Rangers =

Canadian junior ice hockey team

- City: Toronto, Ontario, Canada
- League: Ontario Hockey Association
- Operated: 1928–1948
- Home arena: Maple Leaf Gardens

The Toronto Young Rangers were a Canadian junior ice hockey team in the Ontario Hockey Association (OHA), based in Toronto, Ontario, established in the 1928–29 season. Known as the "Bowles Rangers" during the 1940–41 season, Senator Salter Hayden served as the team president. The Young Rangers dropped out of OHA competition after the 1947–48 season and its players dispersed. The Young Rangers' name continued to be used for a minor ice hockey team in the Toronto Hockey League.

They Young Rangers were owned, operated and coached by Ed Wildey (d. July 19, 1964). For contributions to junior hockey, Wildey was awarded the OHA Gold Stick in 1962. He coached 29 players who graduated from junior hockey to play in the National Hockey League (NHL), and previously coached with the Toronto National Sea Fleas. He stressed "clean living, physical fitness, and hard work" to his players.

== Notable players ==
Alumni of the Young Rangers who have been inducted into the Hockey Hall of Fame:

- Herb Carnegie
- Gordie Drillon
- Punch Imlach

List of NHL alumni:

- Vernon Ayres
- Hugh Bolton
- Jim Conacher
- Al Dewsbury
- Gordie Drillon
- Jimmy Fowler
- Jack Gelineau
- George Grigor
- Red Hamill
- Jackie Hamilton
- Murray Henderson
- Ron Hurst
- Punch Imlach
- Jack McLean
- George Parsons
- Charlie Phillips
- Harry Pidhirny
- Bill Shill
- Cliff Simpson
- Don Smillie
- Stan Smrke
- Rhys Thomson

== Season-by-season results ==
Regular season and playoffs results: 1937–1948, 1942–1948

Legend: GP = Games played, W = Wins, L = Losses, T = Ties, Pts = Points, GF = Goals for, GA = Goals against

Season	Regular season									Playoffs
Season	GP	W	L	T	Pts	Pct	GF	GA	Finish	Playoffs
1928–29	12	7	5	0	14	0.583	29	25	2nd Group 5	Won group final (West Toronto Nationals) 8–5; Won eighthfinal (Owen Sound Greys) 8–6; Won quarterfinal (Oshawa Shamrocks) 5–4; Lost semifinal (Toronto Marlboros) 5–4
1929–30	7	2	5	0	4	0.286	15	31	3rd Group 6	Did not qualify
Team did not operate from 1930 to 1933
1933–34	12	8	4	0	22	–	76	50	1st Group 6	Won group final (Parkdale Canoe Club) 13–3; Lost semifinal (Toronto St. Michael's Majors) 13–3
1934–35	9	5	3	1	11	0.611	32	25	2nd Group 2	Won group final (Parkdale Canoe Club) 13–4; Lost semifinal (Oshawa Majors) 10–8
1935–36	10	3	7	0	6	0.300	23	33	4th Group 1	Won fourth-place playoff (Toronto Lions) 6–3; Lost group semifinal (West Toronto Nationals) 6–3
1936–37	12	8	3	1	17	0.708	58	30	3rd Group 1	Lost group semifinal (Toronto St. Michael's Majors) 2–1
1937–38	12	6	6	0	12	0.500	41	54	4th Group 1	Lost group semifinal (Oshawa Generals) 2–1
1938–39	14	9	4	1	19	0.692	50	41	2nd Group 2	Won quarterfinal (Guelph Indians) 2–0; Lost semifinal (Toronto Native Sons) 2–1
1939–40	20	12	8	0	24	0.600	67	93	3rd OHA	Lost semifinal (Oshawa Generals) 2–0
1940–41	15	4	10	1	9	0.286	73	84	4th OHA	Lost semifinal (Oshawa Generals) 3–2
1941–42	24	11	11	2	24	0.500	87	89	5th OHA	Won quarterfinal (Toronto St. Michael's Majors) 2–0; Lost semifinal (Guelph Biltmores) 3–1
1942–43	24	7	15	2	16	0.333	80	138	7th OHA	Did not qualify
1943–44	25	1	23	1	3	0.042	48	156	5th Group 1	Did not qualify
1944–45	19	6	13	0	12	0.316	56	90	5th OHA	Won quarterfinal (Toronto Marlboros) 2–0; Lost semifinal (Galt Red Wings) 2–1
1945–46	28	8	17	3	19	0.320	78	110	6th OHA	Lost quarterfinal (Toronto Marlboros) 2–0
1946–47	36	6	30	0	12	0.167	62	117	10th OHA	Did not qualify
1947–48	31	1	30	0	2	0.032	63	259	10th OHA	Did not qualify
