= List of OHA Junior A standings =

This is a list of season-by-season summaries of the Ontario Hockey Association (OHA) junior A division from 1933 to 1972, and its Tier I division from 1972 to 1974.

Legend

- GP = games played
- W = wins
- L = losses
- T = ties
- Pts = points
- GF = goals for
- GA = goals against

== 1933–34 ==
The Toronto St. Michael's Majors won the J. Ross Robertson Cup, defeating the Stratford Midgets 2 games to 0.

Team	GP	W	L	T	Pts	GF	GA
Group 6
Toronto Young Rangers	12	8	4	0	22	76	50
Parkdale Canoe Club	12	5	6	1	14	49	40
Toronto Canoe Club	12	2	10	0	4	37	88
University of Toronto	12	2	10	0	4	38	95
Group 7
Toronto St. Michael's Majors	12	12	0	0	32	104	36
Oshawa Majors	15	12	2	1	25	93	27
Toronto Lions	12	5	6	1	17	47	42
Toronto Native Sons	12	5	6	1	11	57	58
West Toronto Nationals	12	2	10	0	4	25	94
Group 11A
London	6	4	2	0	8	20	9
Woodstock	6	4	2	0	8	15	15
Paris	6	2	3	1	5	16	21
Ingersoll	6	1	4	1	3	15	21
Group 11B
Windsor Wanderers	Only Jr. A team in group						
Group 12
Stratford Midgets	14	11	1	2	24	82	41
Kitchener Empires	15	8	3	4	20	56	54
Galt Terrier Pups	15	8	6	1	17	48	41
Hamilton Hockey Club	16	6	7	3	15	50	47
Brantford Lions	16	0	16	0	0	47	100

Playoffs

Group Semi-finals

London beat Woodstock 3 goals to 2.

(1-2, 2-0)

Kitchener Empires beat Galt Terrier Pups 5 goals to 4.

(1-3, 4-1)

Group Finals

Toronto Young Rangers beat Parkdale Canoe Club 13 goals to 3.

(4-2, 9-1)

Toronto St. Michael's Majors beat Oshawa Majors 2 wins to none, 1 tie.

(3-3, 8-2, 10-4)

Windsor Wanderers beat London 8 goals to 5.

(2-0, 6-5)

Stratford Midgets beat Kitchener Empires 11 goals to 9.

(5-4, 6-5)

Semi-final

Stratford Midgets beat Windsor Wanderers 25 goals to 3.

(6-2, 19-1)

Toronto St. Michael's Majors beat Toronto Young Rangers 13 goals to 3.

(6-0, 7-3)

Robertson Cup Finals

Toronto St. Michael's Majors beat Stratford Midgets 2 wins to none.

(7-0, 4-2)

OHA Grand Championship

Toronto St. Michael's Majors beat St. Michael's Buzzers (Jr. B) by default.

(12-3, default)

== 1934–35 ==
The Kitchener Greenshirts won the J. Ross Robertson Cup by default over the Oshawa Majors.

Team	GP	W	L	T	Pts	GF	GA
Group 1
Oshawa Majors	14	13	1	0	26	94	24
Toronto Lions	13	9	4	0	18	66	61
Toronto St. Michael's Majors	14	6	5	1	13	46	37
West Toronto Nationals	12	1	10	1	3	29	55
Toronto Native Sons	9	0	9	0	0	15	73
Group 2
Parkdale Canoe Club	9	5	2	2	12	30	26
Toronto Young Rangers	9	5	3	1	11	32	25
Toronto Cubs	9	4	3	2	10	27	18
University of Toronto	9	1	7	1	3	21	41
Group 3
Kitchener Greenshirts	19	18	1	0	36	106	36
Stratford Midgets	20	11	8	1	23	34	30
Galt Terrier Pups	20	10	10	0	20	47	76
Brantford	19	9	9	1	19	51	53
Hamilton	20	6	14	0	12	48	90
Guelph	20	4	16	0	8	27	48
Group 4
Windsor Wanderers	Only Jr. A team in group						

Playoffs

Group Semi-finals

Toronto Lions beat Toronto St. Michael's Majors 8 goals to 7.

(0-3, 5-2, 3-2)

Stratford Midgets beat Galt Terrier Pups 11 goals to 2.

(6-1, 5-1)

Group Finals

Oshawa Majors beat Toronto Lions 2 wins to none.

(10-2, 10-3)

Toronto Young Rangers beat Parkdale Canoe Club 13 goals to 4.

(4-3, 9-1)

Kitchener Greenshirts beat Stratford Midgets 2 wins to none, 1 tie.

(2-2, 6-1, 5-4)

Semi-final

Kitchener Greenshirts beat Windsor Wanderers 10 goals to 4.

(4-1, 6-3)

Oshawa Majors beat Toronto Young Rangers 10 goals to 8.
(3-4, 4-3, 3-1)

Robertson Cup Final

Results thrown out due to Oshawa using illegal player.

Oshawa won Game 1 4-1, Kitchener won Game 2 4-3, then it was discovered that Oshawa used an illegal player (Bill Bagnall). Due to time constraints a third game was then played to determine entry into the Memorial Cup playdowns, but not the winner of the winner of the Robertson Cup -- to be determined later.

Robertson Cup replay

Quarter-final

Toronto Lions 9 - Toronto Young Rangers 8 (OT)

Semi-final

Kitchener Greenshirts 7 - Toronto Lions 5

Final

Kitchener Greenshirts beat Oshawa Majors by default

Oshawa refused to play, claiming they had already won the championship. The Ontario Hockey Association disagreed and awarded the title to Kitchener.

== 1935–36 ==
The West Toronto Nationals won the J. Ross Robertson Cup, defeating the Kitchener Greenshirts 2 games to 0.

Team	GP	W	L	T	Pts	GF	GA
Group 1
Toronto St. Michael's Majors	10	9	1	0	16	55	16
West Toronto Nationals	10	8	2	0	16	59	18
Toronto Native Sons	10	6	4	0	12	28	29
Toronto Young Rangers	11	4	7	0	8	29	36
Toronto Lions	11	3	8	0	6	23	45
University of Toronto	10	1	9	0	2	15	65
Group 2
Kitchener Greenshirts	8	7	1	0	14	31	16
Niagara Falls	7	4	3	0	10	31	27
Stratford Midgets	9	3	5	1	7	29	27
Port Colborne	7	0	6	1	3	18	39
Group 3
Oshawa Majors	Only Jr. A team in group						

Playoffs

Group Semi-finals

Toronto St. Michael's Majors beat Toronto Native Sons 9 goals to 6.

(3-4, 6-2)

West Toronto Nationals beat Toronto Young Rangers 6 goals to 3.

(5-0, 1-3)

Stratford Midgets beat Niagara Falls 12 goals to 9.

(6-5, 6-4)

Group Finals

West Toronto Nationals beat Toronto St. Michael's Majors 3 wins to none.

(1-0, 6-1, 6-5)

Kitchener Greenshirts beat Stratford Midgets 5 goals to 1.

(2-0, 3-1)

Semi-final

West Toronto Nationals beat Oshawa Majors 2 wins to none.

(5-2, 6-2)

Robertson Cup Final

West Toronto Nationals beat Kitchener Greenshirts 2 wins to none.

(3-2, 6-1)

== 1936–37 ==
The Toronto St. Michael's Majors won the J. Ross Robertson Cup, defeating the Stratford Midgets 3 games to 2.

Team	GP	W	L	T	Pts	GF	GA
Group 1
Toronto St. Michael's Majors	12	9	2	1	19	62	27
Oshawa Generals	12	8	2	2	18	69	36
Toronto Young Rangers	12	8	3	1	17	58	30
Toronto British Consols	12	6	4	2	14	53	46
Toronto Lions	12	4	8	0	8	36	60
University of Toronto	12	3	9	0	6	41	63
Toronto Native Sons	12	1	11	0	2	18	75
Group 2
Stratford Midgets	Only Junior A teams						
Kitchener Greenshirts	from a mixed group						

Playoffs

Group Semi-finals

Toronto St. Michael's Majors beat Toronto Young Rangers 2 wins to 1.

(7-4, 3-4, 12-4)

Toronto British Consols beat Oshawa Generals 2 wins to none.

(4-1, 5-5, 7-4)

Group Finals

Toronto St. Michael's Majors beat Toronto British Consols 3 wins to none.

(4-3, 5-3, 3-1)

Stratford Midgets beat Kitchener Greenshirts 2 wins to none.

(5-3, 4-1)

Robertson Cup

Toronto St. Michael's Majors beat Stratford Midgets 3 wins to 2.

(6-2, 4-7, 4-5, 6-5, 8-3)

== 1937–38 ==
The Oshawa Generals won the J. Ross Robertson Cup, defeating the Guelph Indians 3 games to 0.

Team	GP	W	L	T	Pts	GF	GA
Group 1
Toronto Marlboros	12	12	0	0	24	80	27
Oshawa Generals	12	8	4	0	16	57	42
Toronto St. Michael's Majors	12	7	5	0	14	52	38
Toronto Young Rangers	12	6	6	0	12	41	54
Toronto Native Sons	12	5	7	0	10	45	44
Toronto Varsity Blues	11	2	9	0	4	27	47
Toronto Lions	11	1	10	0	2	22	72
Group 2
Stratford Midgets	16	14	2	0	28	-	-
Guelph Indians	16	11	5	0	22	-	-
Kitchener Greenshirts	16	7	8	1	15	-	-
Galt Terrier Pups	16	5	10	1	11	-	-
Hamilton Tigers	16	2	14	0	4	-	-

== 1938–39 ==
The Oshawa Generals won the J. Ross Robertson Cup, defeating the Toronto Native Sons 3 games to 0.

Team	GP	W	L	T	Pts	GF	GA
Group 1
Toronto St. Michael's Majors	14	10	4	0	20	70	43
Guelph Indians	14	7	5	2	15	30	38
Toronto Marlboros	14	4	9	1	9	33	53
Toronto Varsity Blues	14	1	10	3	5	27	63
Group 2
Oshawa Generals	14	13	1	0	36	83	27
Toronto Young Rangers	14	9	4	1	19	50	41
Toronto Native Sons	14	7	6	1	15	53	45
Toronto Lions	14	1	13	0	2	24	76

== 1939–40 ==
The Guelph Indians become Guelph Biltmores. The league drops its divisions. The Toronto St. Michael's Majors and the Toronto Lions drop out of the league. The University of Toronto Varsity Blues drop out of the league mid-season. The Oshawa Generals won the J. Ross Robertson Cup, defeating the Toronto Marlboros 3 games to 2.

Team	GP	W	L	T	Pts	GF	GA
Oshawa Generals	18	15	1	2	32	120	46
Toronto Marlboros	19	11	5	3	25	106	49
Toronto Young Rangers	20	12	8	0	24	67	93
Guelph Biltmores	20	10	8	2	22	88	61
Toronto Native Sons	20	4	15	1	9	48	113
Toronto Varsity Blues*	17	1	16	0	2	39	108

== 1940–41 ==
Toronto Young Rangers are renamed Toronto Bowles Rangers. The Oshawa Generals won the J. Ross Robertson Cup, defeating the Toronto Marlboros 4 games to 3.

Team	GP	W	L	T	Pts	GF	GA
Toronto Marlboros	17	13	3	1	25	113	51
Oshawa Generals	16	10	4	2	22	101	67
Guelph Biltmores	16	11	5	0	22	85	75
Toronto Bowles Rangers	15	4	10	1	9	73	84
Toronto Native Sons	15	0	15	0	0	52	147

== 1941–42 ==
The Toronto Bowles Rangers revert to being the Toronto Young Rangers. The Toronto St. Michael's Majors rejoin the league. The Brantford Lions join the league. The Toronto Native Sons drop out halfway through the season, and declare all their games forfeit. The Oshawa Generals won the J. Ross Robertson Cup, defeating the Guelph Biltmores 3 games to 2.

Team	GP	W	L	T	Pts	GF	GA
Brantford Lions	24	19	5	0	38	183	83
Oshawa Generals	24	17	7	0	34	143	88
Guelph Biltmores	24	13	11	0	26	100	115
Toronto Marlboros	24	12	10	2	26	73	79
Toronto Young Rangers	24	11	11	2	24	87	89
Toronto St. Michael's Majors	24	10	14	0	20	66	120
Toronto Native Sons*	—	0	24	0	0	43	120

== 1942–43 ==
The Hamilton Whizzers and the Stratford Kroehlers join the league. The Guelph Biltmores drop out of the league. The Toronto Young Rangers drop out of the league. The Oshawa Generals won the J. Ross Robertson Cup, defeating the Brantford Lions 4 games to 1.

Team	GP	W	L	T	Pts	GF	GA
Oshawa Generals	22	17	5	0	36	134	72
Brantford Lions	22	12	10	2	26	102	98
Hamilton Whizzers	24	11	9	4	26	122	106
Stratford Kroehlers	25	7	9	9	24	75	78
Toronto St. Michael's Majors	21	9	11	1	23	92	99
Toronto Marlboros	21	8	12	1	17	105	119

== 1943–44 ==
The OHA splits into two groups when four teams join the league; the Galt Canadians, St. Catharines Falcons, Port Colborne Recreationists, and Toronto Young Rangers. The Oshawa Generals won the J. Ross Robertson Cup, defeating the Toronto St. Michael's Majors 4 games to 1. Oshawa's Ken Smith won the scoring title with 53 goals and 26 assists for 79 points, followed by teammates Bob Love (75) and Bill Ezinicki (63).

Team	GP	W	L	T	Pts	GF	GA
Group 1
Oshawa Generals	26	23	3	0	46	203	69
Toronto St. Michael's Majors	25	21	4	0	44	169	69
Hamilton Whizzers	25	12	12	1	25	113	124
Toronto Marlboros	26	8	15	1	18	73	122
Toronto Young Rangers	25	1	23	1	3	48	156
Group 2
St. Catharines Falcons	26	15	9	2	32	125	103
Galt Canadians	26	15	11	0	30	125	97
Brantford Lions	25	11	13	1	23	90	126
Port Colborne Recreationists	26	10	16	0	20	111	126
Stratford Kroehlers	25	7	16	2	16	99	154

== 1944–45 ==
The OHA groups are dissolved when the Brantford Lions, Stratford Kroehlers and Hamilton Barons drop out of league. The Galt Canadians become the Galt Red Wings. The Port Colborne Recreationists had only one victory as of December 13, 1944, when they withdrew from the OHA citing lack of competitiveness and transportation. The inaugural Red Tilson Trophy is awarded to Doug McMurdy, as the most outstanding player in the OHA; Albert "Red" Tilson, a recent Oshawa Generals player and the OHA scoring champion of 1942–43, was killed in World War II action just as the 1944–45 OHA season was starting. The Toronto St. Michael's Majors won the J. Ross Robertson Cup, defeating the Galt Red Wings 4 games to 0.

Team	GP	W	L	T	Pts	GF	GA
Toronto St. Michael's Majors	19	18	1	0	36	174	54
St. Catharines Falcons	20	12	8	0	24	101	93
Galt Red Wings	20	12	8	0	24	83	91
Oshawa Generals	20	9	11	0	18	75	80
Toronto Young Rangers	19	6	13	0	12	56	90
Toronto Marlboros	20	2	18	0	4	52	141
Port Colborne Recreationists*	7	1	6	0	2	24	49

(*) folded mid-season

== 1945–46 ==
The Barrie Flyers and the Hamilton Lloyds join the league. The inaugural Eddie Powers Memorial Trophy is awarded for the top scorer in the league to Tod Sloan. He was also awarded the Red Tilson Trophy as the most outstanding player. The Toronto St. Michael's Majors won the J. Ross Robertson Cup, defeating the Oshawa Generals 4 games to 2.

Team	GP	W	L	T	Pts	GF	GA
Toronto St. Michael's Majors	28	26	2	0	52	199	54
Galt Red Wings	28	22	6	0	44	187	96
Oshawa Generals	28	17	11	0	34	155	101
St. Catharines Falcons	28	14	14	0	28	133	123
Toronto Marlboros	28	11	16	1	23	78	111
Toronto Young Rangers	28	8	17	3	19	78	110
Barrie Flyers	28	8	18	2	18	89	171
Hamilton Lloyds	28	3	25	0	6	76	229

== 1946–47 ==
The Hamilton Lloyds become Hamilton Szabos. The Windsor Spitfires join the league, and the Stratford Kroehlers rejoin the league. The Toronto St. Michael's Majors won the J. Ross Robertson Cup, defeating the Galt Red Wings 4 games to 0.

Awards

- Red Tilson Trophy (Most outstanding player) = Ed Sandford, Toronto St. Michael's Majors
- Eddie Powers Memorial Trophy (Top scorer) = Fleming Mackell, Toronto St. Michael's Majors

Team	GP	W	L	T	Pts	GF	GA
Toronto St. Michael's Majors	36	33	3	0	66	234	59
Oshawa Generals	36	28	8	0	56	217	109
Galt Red Wings	36	27	9	0	54	232	99
Stratford Kroehlers	36	22	14	0	44	164	108
Toronto Marlboros	36	20	16	0	40	87	84
Barrie Flyers	35	17	16	2	36	129	144
Windsor Spitfires	36	10	24	2	22	75	125
St. Catharines Falcons	36	7	25	4	18	101	219
Hamilton Szabos	38	6	32	0	12	76	313
Toronto Young Rangers	36	6	30	0	12	62	117

== 1947–48 ==
Hamilton drops out of the league. The Guelph Biltmores rejoin the league. The Galt Red Wings become the Galt Rockets. The St. Catharines Falcons become the St. Catharines Teepees. The Barrie Flyers won the J. Ross Robertson Cup, defeating the Windsor Spitfires 4 games to 2.

Awards

- Red Tilson Trophy (Most outstanding player) = George Armstrong, Stratford Kroehlers
- Eddie Powers Memorial Trophy (Top scorer) = George Armstrong, Stratford Kroehlers

Team	GP	W	L	T	Pts	GF	GA
Windsor Spitfires	36	29	6	1	59	231	124
Oshawa Generals	36	27	8	1	55	173	80
Barrie Flyers	36	23	13	0	46	198	116
Stratford Kroehlers	36	21	13	2	44	151	134
Galt Rockets	36	18	13	5	41	168	129
St. Catharines Teepees	36	19	17	0	38	137	155
Toronto Marlboros	32	12	20	0	30	97	149
Guelph Biltmores	36	12	23	1	25	144	168
Toronto St. Michael's Majors	32	6	26	0	16	76	135
Toronto Young Rangers	31	1	30	0	2	63	259

== 1948–49 ==
Toronto Young Rangers drop out of the league. The Barrie Flyers won the J. Ross Robertson Cup.

Awards

- Red Tilson Trophy (Most outstanding player) = Gil Mayer, Barrie Flyers
- Eddie Powers Memorial Trophy (Top scorer) = Bert Giesebrecht, Windsor Spitfires
- Dave Pinkney Trophy (Goaltenders of team with lowest GAA) = Gil Mayer, Barrie Flyers

Team	GP	W	L	T	Pts	GF	GA
Windsor Spitfires	48	34	13	1	69	272	184
Barrie Flyers	48	28	16	4	60	208	134
Oshawa Generals	48	27	18	3	57	207	172
St. Catharines Teepees	48	25	20	3	53	191	198
Stratford Kroehlers	48	25	21	2	52	190	200
Toronto Marlboros	48	20	24	4	44	168	176
Guelph Biltmores	48	20	26	2	42	169	221
Toronto St. Michael's Majors	48	13	31	4	30	96	128
Galt Rockets	48	11	34	3	25	154	252

== 1949–50 ==
The Galt Rockets become the Galt Black Hawks. The Guelph Biltmores won the J. Ross Robertson Cup.

Awards

- Red Tilson Trophy (Most outstanding player) = George Armstrong, Toronto Marlboros
- Eddie Powers Memorial Trophy (Top scorer) = Earl Reibel, Windsor Spitfires
- Dave Pinkney Trophy (Goaltenders of team with lowest GAA) = Don Lockhart, Toronto Marlboros

Team	GP	W	L	T	Pts	GF	GA
Toronto Marlboros	48	37	9	2	76	253	119
Windsor Spitfires	48	34	13	1	69	307	169
St. Catharines Teepees	48	27	17	4	58	269	211
Guelph Biltmores	48	26	18	4	56	189	157
Barrie Flyers	48	21	24	3	45	180	217
Toronto St. Michael's Majors	48	19	26	3	41	164	213
Stratford Kroehlers	48	14	31	3	31	165	218
Galt Black Hawks	48	14	32	2	30	144	265
Oshawa Generals	48	12	34	2	26	160	262

== 1950–51 ==
The Waterloo Hurricanes join the league. The Barrie Flyers won the J. Ross Robertson Cup.

Awards

- Red Tilson Trophy (Most outstanding player) = Glenn Hall, Windsor Spitfires
- Eddie Powers Memorial Trophy (Top scorer) = Lou Jankowski, Oshawa Generals
- Dave Pinkney Trophy (Goaltenders of team with lowest GAA) = Don Lockhart, Toronto Marlboros & Lorne Howes, Barrie Flyers

All Stars

- G: Glenn Hall, Windsor Spitfires
- D: Jim Morrison, Guelph Biltmores
- D: Frank Martin, St. Catharines Teepees
- C: Alex Delvecchio, Oshawa Generals, and Ken Laufman, Guelph Biltmores (tied)
- R: Lou Jankowski, Oshawa Generals
- L: Real Chevrefils, Barrie Flyers

Team	GP	W	L	T	Pts	GF	GA
Barrie Flyers	54	38	14	2	78	276	161
Toronto Marlboros	54	32	16	6	70	220	167
Guelph Biltmores	54	31	16	7	69	256	194
Windsor Spitfires	54	32	18	4	68	209	167
Oshawa Generals	54	26	26	2	54	250	231
St. Catharines Teepees	54	23	24	7	53	200	192
Galt Black Hawks	54	21	39	4	48	181	223
Stratford Kroehlers	54	20	28	6	46	200	230
Toronto St. Michael's Majors	54	16	31	7	39	189	244
Waterloo Hurricanes	54	7	44	3	17	163	339

== 1951–52 ==
The Kitchener Greenshirts join the league. The Stratford Kroehlers drop out of the league. The Guelph Biltmores won the J. Ross Robertson Cup.

Awards

- Red Tilson Trophy (Most outstanding player) = Bill Harrington, Kitchener Greenshirts
- Eddie Powers Memorial Trophy (Top scorer) = Ken Laufman, Guelph Biltmores
- Dave Pinkney Trophy (Goaltenders of team with lowest GAA) = Don Head, Toronto Marlboros

Team	GP	W	L	T	Pts	GF	GA
Toronto Marlboros	53	39	8	6	84	302	146
Guelph Biltmores	54	37	13	4	78	341	197
Galt Black Hawks	54	35	17	2	72	307	213
Toronto St. Michael's Majors	53	30	20	3	63	227	188
St. Catharines Teepees	54	30	23	1	61	249	229
Kitchener Greenshirts	54	29	22	3	61	231	213
Barrie Flyers	53	22	30	1	47	225	230
Waterloo Hurricanes	53	15	37	1	31	215	363
Windsor Spitfires	54	9	42	3	21	172	355
Oshawa Generals	54	7	41	6	20	146	281

== 1952–53 ==
The Waterloo Hurricanes drop out of the league. The Barrie Flyers won the J. Ross Robertson Cup.

Awards

- Red Tilson Trophy (Most outstanding player) = Bob Attersley, Oshawa Generals
- Eddie Powers Memorial Trophy (Top scorer) = Jim McBurney, Galt Black Hawks
- Dave Pinkney Trophy (Goaltenders of team with lowest GAA) = John Henderson, Toronto Marlboros

Team	GP	W	L	T	Pts	GF	GA
Barrie Flyers	56	37	17	2	76	258	187
Toronto Marlboros	56	32	17	7	71	199	139
Toronto St. Michael's Majors	56	31	18	7	69	238	181
St. Catharines Teepees	56	31	20	5	67	219	234
Galt Black Hawks	56	27	26	3	57	242	225
Oshawa Generals	56	24	29	3	51	230	271
Guelph Biltmores	56	22	32	2	46	212	244
Windsor Spitfires	56	16	35	5	37	127	186
Kitchener Greenshirts	56	15	38	3	33	181	239

== 1953–54 ==
The Windsor Spitfires become the Hamilton Tiger Cubs. The Oshawa Generals drop out of the league, after a fire destroys the Hambly Arena. The St. Catharines Teepees won the J. Ross Robertson Cup.

Awards

- Red Tilson Trophy (Most outstanding player) = Brian Cullen, St. Catharines Teepees
- Eddie Powers Memorial Trophy (Top scorer) = Brian Cullen, St. Catharines Teepees
- Dave Pinkney Trophy (Goaltenders of team with lowest GAA) = Dennis Riggin, Hamilton Tiger Cubs

Team	GP	W	L	T	Pts	GF	GA
St. Catharines Teepees	59	42	15	2	86	308	211
Toronto Marlboros	59	34	18	7	75	242	160
Hamilton Tiger Cubs	58	31	24	3	65	222	208
Toronto St. Michael's Majors	59	30	26	3	63	246	211
Kitchener Greenshirts	59	27	27	5	59	236	211
Guelph Biltmores	59	26	31	2	54	248	268
Barrie Flyers	59	25	33	1	51	260	285
Galt Black Hawks	59	21	37	1	43	204	288

== 1954–55 ==
The Kitchener Greenshirts become the Kitchener Canucks. The Toronto Marlboros won the J. Ross Robertson Cup.

Awards

- Red Tilson Trophy (Most outstanding player) = Hank Ciesla, St. Catharines Teepees
- Eddie Powers Memorial Trophy (Top scorer) = Hank Ciesla, St. Catharines Teepees
- Dave Pinkney Trophy (Goaltenders of team with lowest GAA) = John Albani, Toronto Marlboros

All Stars - First Team

- G: Dennis Riggin, Hamilton Tiger Cubs
- D: Ron Howell, Guelph Biltmores
- D: Elmer Vasko, St. Catharines Teepees
- C: Hank Ciesla, St. Catharines Teepees
- R: Barry Cullen, St. Catharines Teepees
- L: Bill McCreary, Guelph Biltmores

All Stars - Second Team

- G: John Albani, Toronto Marlboros
- D: Larry Hillman, Hamilton Tiger Cubs
- D: unknown
- C: Billy Harris, Toronto Marlboros
- R: Gary Aldcorn, Toronto Marlboros
- L: Dick Duff, Toronto St. Michael's Majors

Team	GP	W	L	T	Pts	GF	GA
St. Catharines Teepees	49	32	15	2	66	260	176
Guelph Biltmores	49	32	15	2	66	211	158
Toronto Marlboros	49	29	17	3	61	189	142
Toronto St. Michael's Majors	49	26	19	4	56	171	151
Hamilton Tiger Cubs	49	21	23	5	47	181	173
Galt Black Hawks	49	18	25	6	42	181	203
Barrie Flyers	49	18	31	0	36	169	251
Kitchener Canucks	49	8	39	2	18	140	248

== 1955–56 ==
The Galt Black Hawks drop out of the league. The Toronto Marlboros won the J. Ross Robertson Cup.

Awards

- Red Tilson Trophy (Most outstanding player) = Ron Howell, Guelph Biltmores
- Eddie Powers Memorial Trophy (Top scorer) = Stan Baluik, Kitchener Canucks
- Dave Pinkney Trophy (Goaltenders of team with lowest GAA) = Jim Crocket, Toronto Marlboros

All Stars - First Team

- G: Dennis Riggin, Hamilton Tiger Cubs
- D: Ron Howell, Guelph Biltmores
- D: Elmer Vasko, St. Catharines Teepees
- C: Stan Baluik, Kitchener Canucks
- R: Walt Bradley, Kitchener Canucks
- L: Ab McDonald, St. Catharines Teepees

All Stars - Second Team

- G: Roy Edwards, St. Catharines Teepees
- D: Al MacNeil, Toronto Marlboros
- D: Bob Baun, Toronto Marlboros
- C: Max Szturm, Hamilton Tiger Cubs
- R: Bob Forhan, Guelph Biltmores
- L: Frank Mahovlich, Toronto St. Michael's Majors

Team	GP	W	L	T	Pts	GF	GA
St. Catharines Teepees	48	28	17	3	59	219	197
Kitchener Canucks	48	26	21	1	53	222	198
Guelph Biltmores	48	25	20	3	53	262	195
Toronto Marlboros	48	23	21	4	50	174	164
Toronto St. Michael's Majors	48	22	23	3	47	181	197
Barrie Flyers	48	20	25	3	43	179	207
Hamilton Tiger Cubs	48	13	30	5	31	171	250

== 1956–57 ==
The Kitchener Canucks become the Peterborough TPT Petes. The Guelph Biltmores won the J. Ross Robertson Cup. Each team played each other team eight times, as well as playing four games against the Hull-Ottawa Canadiens.

Awards

- Red Tilson Trophy (Most outstanding player) = Frank Mahovlich, Toronto St. Michael's Majors
- Eddie Powers Memorial Trophy (Top scorer) = Bill Sweeney, Guelph Biltmores
- Dave Pinkney Trophy (Goaltenders of team with lowest GAA) = Len Broderick, Toronto Marlboros

All Stars - First Team

- G: Bruce Gamble, Guelph Biltmores
- D: Ron Casey, Toronto Marlboros
- D: Harry Neale, Toronto Marlboros
- C: Frank Mahovlich, Toronto St. Michael's Majors
- R: Bob Nevin, Toronto Marlboros
- L: Eddie Shack, Guelph Biltmores

All Stars - Second Team

- G: Carl Wetzel, Hamilton Tiger Cubs
- D: John Chasczewski, Barrie Flyers
- D: unknown
- C: Bill Sweeney, Guelph Biltmores, and Bill Kennedy, Toronto Marlboros
- R: unknown
- L: unknown

Team	GP	W	L	T	Pts	GF	GA
Guelph Biltmores	52	37	12	3	77	237	143
Toronto Marlboros	52	35	14	3	73	189	133
St. Catharines Teepees	52	25	25	2	52	184	193
Toronto St. Michael's Majors	52	23	24	5	51	195	189
Hamilton Tiger Cubs	52	24	26	2	50	170	191
Barrie Flyers	52	13	37	2	28	147	218
Peterborough TPT Petes	52	11	40	1	23	139	239
Hull-Ottawa Canadiens	28	17	7	4	38	121	76

== 1957–58 ==
Each team played each other team eight times, as well as playing four games against the Hull-Ottawa Canadiens (although the final game between Barrie and Hull-Ottawa was cancelled). The Hamilton Spectator donated a trophy awarded annually to the team that finished first overall in the regular season. The St. Catharines Teepees won the first Hamilton Spectator Trophy. The Toronto Marlboros won the J. Ross Robertson Cup.

Awards

- Red Tilson Trophy (Most outstanding player) = Murray Oliver, Hamilton Tiger Cubs
- Eddie Powers Memorial Trophy (Top scorer) = John McKenzie, St. Catharines Teepees
- Dave Pinkney Trophy (Goaltenders of team with lowest GAA) = Len Broderick, Toronto Marlboros

All Stars - First Team

- G: Bruce Gamble, Guelph Biltmores
- D: Carl Brewer, Toronto Marlboros
- D: Wayne Hillman, St. Catharines Teepees
- C: Ed Hoekstra, St. Catharines Teepees
- R: John McKenzie, St. Catharines Teepees
- L: Jack McMaster, Toronto Marlboros

All Stars - Second Team

- G: Carl Wetzel, Hamilton Tiger Cubs
- D: Irv Spencer, Peterborough TPT Petes
- D: Wally Chevrier, Guelph Biltmores
- C: Murray Oliver, Hamilton Tiger Cubs
- R: Bob Nevin, Toronto Marlboros
- L: Stan Mikita, St. Catharines Teepees

Team	GP	W	L	T	Pts	GF	GA
St. Catharines Teepees	52	32	14	6	70	246	174
Hamilton Tiger Cubs	52	27	18	7	61	200	176
Toronto St. Michael's Majors	52	23	22	7	53	176	189
Toronto Marlboros	52	21	21	10	52	210	186
Peterborough TPT Petes	52	21	25	6	48	159	185
Barrie Flyers	51	18	29	4	40	201	234
Guelph Biltmores	52	13	34	5	31	137	223
Hull-Ottawa Canadiens	27	17	9	1	38	149	112

== 1958–59 ==
The St. Catharines Teepees repeated their first overall finish in the regular season, winning the Hamilton Spectator Trophy. The Peterborough TPT Petes won the J. Ross Robertson Cup.

Awards

- Red Tilson Trophy (Most outstanding player) = Stan Mikita, St. Catharines Teepees
- Eddie Powers Memorial Trophy (Top scorer) = Stan Mikita, St. Catharines Teepees
- Dave Pinkney Trophy (Goaltenders of team with lowest GAA) = Jacques Caron, Peterborough TPT Petes

All Stars - First Team

- G: Denis DeJordy, St. Catharines Teepees
- D: Lloyd Haddon, Hamilton Tiger Cubs
- D: Pat Stapleton, St. Catharines Teepees
- C: Stan Mikita, St. Catharines Teepees
- R: Wayne Connelly, Peterborough TPT Petes
- L: Fred Hilts, St. Catharines Teepees

All Stars - Second Team

- G: Norm Jacques, Barrie Flyers
- D: Wayne Hillman, St. Catharines Teepees
- D: Darryl Sly, Toronto St. Michael's Majors, and Roger Cote, Toronto Marlboros (tied)
- C: Larry Babcock, Peterborough TPT Petes, and Danny Patrick, Barrie Flyers (tied)
- R: Chico Maki, St. Catharines Teepees
- L: Bill Mahoney, Peterborough TPT Petes

Team	GP	W	L	T	Pts	GF	GA
St. Catharines Teepees	54	40	11	3	84	257	175
Peterborough TPT Petes	54	29	20	5	63	222	179
Guelph Biltmores	54	23	18	13	59	220	226
Toronto St. Michael's Majors	48	19	24	5	51	149	159
Barrie Flyers	54	21	27	6	48	178	192
Toronto Marlboros	54	19	27	8	46	160	213
Hamilton Tiger Cubs	54	11	35	8	30	167	229

== 1959–60 ==
The Toronto Marlboros finished first overall in the regular season, winning the Hamilton Spectator Trophy. The St. Catharines Teepees won the J. Ross Robertson Cup.

Awards

- Red Tilson Trophy (Most outstanding player) = Wayne Connelly, Peterborough TPT Petes
- Eddie Powers Memorial Trophy (Top scorer) = Chico Maki, St. Catharines Teepees
- Dave Pinkney Trophy (Goaltenders of team with lowest GAA) = Gerry Cheevers, Toronto St. Michael's Majors

All Stars

- G: Roger Crozier, St. Catharines Teepees
- D: Dale Rolfe, Barrie Flyers
- D: Pat Stapleton, St. Catharines Teepees
- C: Dave Keon, Toronto St. Michael's Majors
- R: Chico Maki, St. Catharines Teepees
- L: Pierre Gagne, Barrie Flyers, and Vic Hadfield, St. Catharines Teepees

Team	GP	W	L	T	Pts	GF	GA
Toronto Marlboros	48	28	17	3	59	222	180
St. Catharines Teepees	48	25	19	4	54	209	191
Barrie Flyers	48	24	18	6	54	193	172
Toronto St. Michael's Majors	48	23	19	6	52	149	150
Peterborough TPT Petes	48	22	23	3	47	206	205
Guelph Biltmores	48	19	21	8	46	197	185
Hamilton Tiger Cubs	48	10	34	4	24	158	251

== 1960–61 ==
The Guelph Biltmores became the Guelph Royals, the Barrie Flyers became the Niagara Falls Flyers, and the Hamilton Tiger Cubs became the Hamilton Red Wings. The OHA introduced the Max Kaminsky Trophy, awarded to the league's most gentlemanly player. The Guelph Royals finished first in the regular season standings and received the Hamilton Spectator Trophy, while the Toronto St. Michael's Majors won the J. Ross Robertson Cup.

Awards

- Red Tilson Trophy (Most outstanding player) = Rod Gilbert, Guelph Royals
- Eddie Powers Memorial Trophy (Top scorer) = Rod Gilbert, Guelph Royals
- Dave Pinkney Trophy (Goaltenders of team with lowest GAA) = Bud Blom, Hamilton Red Wings
- Max Kaminsky Trophy (Most gentlemanly player) = Bruce Draper, Toronto St. Michael's Majors

All Stars - First Team

- G: Roger Crozier, St. Catharines Teepees
- D: Ed Westfall, Niagara Falls Flyers
- D: Barclay Plager, Peterborough TPT Petes, and Al LeBrun, Guelph Royals (tied)
- C: Bruce Draper, Toronto St. Michael's Majors
- R: Rod Gilbert, Guelph Royals
- L: Gary Jarrett, Toronto Marlboros

All Stars - Second Team

- G: Gerry Cheevers, Toronto St. Michael's Majors
- D: Mike McMahon, Guelph Royals
- D: Terry O'Malley, Toronto St. Michael's Majors
- C: Jean Ratelle, Guelph Royals
- R: Murray Hall, St. Catharines Teepees
- L: Bob Cunningham, Guelph Royals

Team	GP	W	L	T	Pts	GF	GA
Guelph Royals	48	30	9	9	69	255	165
Toronto St. Michael's Majors	48	26	16	6	58	160	160
Hamilton Red Wings	48	22	19	7	51	192	148
Niagara Falls Flyers	48	22	21	5	49	165	166
St. Catharines Teepees	48	18	24	6	42	167	204
Peterborough TPT Petes	48	16	24	8	40	167	188
Toronto Marlboros	48	9	30	9	27	136	211

== 1961–62 ==
The Montreal Jr. Canadiens join the OHA from the Quebec Junior Hockey League. The Metro Junior A League starts. Its teams will be the St. Michael's Majors, Toronto Marlboros, Brampton 7Ups, Unionville Seaforths and Whitby Mohawks. The Montreal Junior Canadiens finished first overall in the regular season, winning the Hamilton Spectator Trophy. The Hamilton Red Wings won the J. Ross Robertson Cup.

Awards

- Red Tilson Trophy (Most outstanding player) = Pit Martin, Hamilton Red Wings
- Eddie Powers Memorial Trophy (Top scorer) = Andre Boudrias, Montreal Junior Canadiens
- Dave Pinkney Trophy (Goaltenders of team with lowest GAA) = George Holmes, Montreal Junior Canadiens
- Max Kaminsky Trophy (Most gentlemanly player) = Lowell MacDonald, Hamilton Tiger Cubs

All Stars - First Team

- G: Roger Crozier, St. Catharines Teepees
- D: Jacques Laperriere, Montreal Junior Canadiens
- D: Mike McMahon, Guelph Royals, and Ron Harris, Hamilton Red Wings
- C: Pit Martin, Hamilton Red Wings
- R: Lowell MacDonald, Hamilton Red Wings
- L: Rejean Richer, Montreal Junior Canadiens

All Stars - Second Team

- G: Buddy Blom, Hamilton Red Wings
- D: Bob Wall, Hamilton Red Wings
- D: John Gravel, Montreal Junior Canadiens
- C: Phil Esposito, St. Catharines Teepees
- R: Andre Boudrias, Montreal Junior Canadiens
- L: Howie Dietrich, Niagara Falls Flyers

Team	GP	W	L	T	Pts	GF	GA
Provincial Jr. A.
Montreal Junior Canadiens	50	34	11	5	73	230	138
Hamilton Red Wings	50	32	12	6	70	220	162
St. Catharines Teepees	50	19	23	8	46	194	206
Niagara Falls Flyers	50	16	23	11	43	193	193
Guelph Royals	50	18	26	6	42	194	236
Peterborough Petes	50	9	33	8	26	114	210
Metro Jr. A.
Toronto St. Michael's Majors	33	25	7	1	55	170	91
Toronto Marlboros	33	18	9	6	44	141	103
Whitby Mohawks	36	14	20	2	30	123	170
Brampton 7–Ups	36	11	21	4	26	143	189
Unionville Seaforths	36	10	21	5	25	133	157

== 1962–63 ==
The Oshawa Generals join the Metro Junior League. The Toronto St. Michael's Majors become the Toronto Neil McNeil Maroons. The Unionville Seaforths become Toronto Knob Hill Farms. The Whitby Mohawks become the Whitby Dunlops. The St. Catharines Teepees become the St. Catharines Black Hawks. The Niagara Falls Flyers finished first overall in the regular season, winning the Hamilton Spectator Trophy, and won the J. Ross Robertson Cup in the playoffs.

Awards

- Red Tilson Trophy (Most outstanding player) = Wayne Maxner, Niagara Falls Flyers
- Eddie Powers Memorial Trophy (Top scorer) = Wayne Maxner, Niagara Falls Flyers
- Dave Pinkney Trophy (Goaltenders of team with lowest GAA) = Chuck Goddard, Peterborough Petes
- Max Kaminsky Trophy (Most gentlemanly player) = Paul Henderson, Hamilton Red Wings

All Stars - First Team

- G: Chuck Goddard, Peterborough Petes
- D: Bryan Watson, Peterborough Petes
- D: Bob Wall, Hamilton Red Wings
- C: Pit Martin, Hamilton Red Wings
- R: Paul Henderson, Hamilton Red Wings
- L: Wayne Maxner, Niagara Falls Flyers

All Stars - Second Team

- G: George Gardner, Niagara Falls Flyers
- D: Poul Popiel, St. Catharines Black Hawks
- D: Ron Hergott and Don Awrey, Niagara Falls Flyers
- C: Billy Inglis, Montreal Junior Canadiens
- R: Yvan Cournoyer, Montreal Junior Canadiens
- L: Germain Gagnon, Montreal Junior Canadiens

Team	GP	W	L	T	Pts	GF	GA
Provincial Jr. A.
Niagara Falls Flyers	50	31	12	7	69	212	146
Montreal Junior Canadiens	50	27	14	9	63	201	146
Peterborough Petes	50	21	18	11	53	144	132
Hamilton Red Wings	50	21	21	8	50	202	184
St. Catharines Black Hawks	50	15	24	11	41	172	224
Guelph Royals	50	9	35	6	24	158	257
Metro Jr. A.
Toronto Neil McNeil Maroons	40	33	4	3	69	260	110
Toronto Marlboros	40	22	12	6	50	217	159
Toronto Knob Hill Farms	40	14	20	6	34	121	154
Whitby Dunlops	40	11	21	8	30	167	225
Oshawa Generals	40	12	23	5	29	146	222
Brampton 7–Ups	40	12	24	4	28	157	208

== 1963–64 ==
The Metro Junior League disbands. The Toronto Marlboros rejoin the OHA, as do the Oshawa Generals although they play their first season in Bowmanville. The other teams in the Metro Junior League cease operations. The Guelph Royals become the Kitchener Rangers. The Toronto Marlboros, now the only team representing Toronto in an OHA Junior A season in the league's history, finished first overall in the regular season, winning the Hamilton Spectator Trophy, and won the J. Ross Robertson Cup in the playoffs.

Awards

- Red Tilson Trophy (Most outstanding player) = Yvan Cournoyer, Montreal Junior Canadiens
- Eddie Powers Memorial Trophy (Top scorer) = Andre Boudrias, Montreal Junior Canadiens
- Dave Pinkney Trophy (Goaltenders of team with lowest GAA) = Bernie Parent, Niagara Falls Flyers
- Max Kaminsky Trophy (Most gentlemanly player) = Fred Stanfield, St. Catharines Black Hawks

All Stars - First Team

- G: Chuck Goddard, Peterborough Petes
- D: Bobby Orr, Oshawa Generals
- D: Doug Jarrett, St. Catharines Black Hawks
- C: Andre Boudrias, Montreal Junior Canadiens
- R: Yvan Cournoyer, Montreal Junior Canadiens
- L: Dennis Hull, St. Catharines Black Hawks

All Stars - Second Team

- G: Bernie Parent, Niagara Falls Flyers
- D: Rod Seiling, Toronto Marlboros
- D: Bob Jamieson, Peterborough Petes
- C: Ron Schock, Niagara Falls Flyers
- R: Ron Ellis, Toronto Marlboros
- L: Wayne Carleton, Toronto Marlboros

Team	GP	W	L	T	Pts	GF	GA
Toronto Marlboros	56	40	9	7	87	336	195
Montreal Junior Canadiens	56	35	16	5	75	289	188
St. Catharines Black Hawks	56	29	20	7	65	244	215
Niagara Falls Flyers	56	26	22	8	60	207	178
Peterborough Petes	56	24	25	7	55	176	200
Oshawa Generals	56	22	28	6	50	236	246
Hamilton Red Wings	56	11	35	10	32	193	285
Kitchener Rangers	56	9	41	6	24	142	316

== 1964–65 ==
The Niagara Falls Flyers finished first overall in the regular season, winning the Hamilton Spectator Trophy, and won the J. Ross Robertson Cup in the playoffs.

Awards

- Red Tilson Trophy (Most outstanding player) = Andre Lacroix, Peterborough Petes
- Eddie Powers Memorial Trophy (Top scorer) = Ken Hodge, St. Catharines Black Hawks
- Dave Pinkney Trophy (Goaltenders of team with lowest GAA) = Bernie Parent, Niagara Falls Flyers
- Max Kaminsky Trophy (Most gentlemanly player) = Jimmy Peters Jr., Hamilton Red Wings

All Stars - First Team

- G: Bernie Parent, Niagara Falls Flyers
- D: Bobby Orr, Oshawa Generals
- D: Jim McKenny, Toronto Marlboros, and Gilles Marotte, Niagara Falls Flyers (tied)
- C: Andre Lacroix, Peterborough Petes
- R: Ken Hodge, St. Catharines Black Hawks
- L: Brit Selby, Toronto Marlboros

All Stars - Second Team

- G: Chuck Goddard, Peterborough Petes
- D: Serge Savard, Montreal Junior Canadiens
- D: John Vanderburg, Peterborough Petes
- C: Ron Buchanan, Oshawa Generals
- R: Danny Grant, Peterborough Petes
- L: Jacques Lemaire, Montreal Junior Canadiens

Team	GP	W	L	T	Pts	GF	GA
Niagara Falls Flyers	56	36	11	9	81	236	168
Toronto Marlboros	56	32	17	7	71	259	222
Peterborough Petes	56	28	20	8	64	243	197
Oshawa Generals	56	23	24	9	55	224	233
Montreal Junior Canadiens	56	20	28	8	48	215	214
Kitchener Rangers	56	19	32	5	43	225	284
St. Catharines Black Hawks	56	19	28	9	41	236	253
Hamilton Red Wings	56	14	31	11	39	220	287

== 1965–66 ==
The London Nationals are granted a franchise, moving their Junior B team of the same name to Ingersoll. The Peterborough Petes finished first overall in the regular season, winning the Hamilton Spectator Trophy. The Oshawa Generals won the J. Ross Robertson Cup.

Awards

- Red Tilson Trophy (Most outstanding player) = Andre Lacroix, Peterborough Petes
- Eddie Powers Memorial Trophy (Top scorer) = Andre Lacroix, Peterborough Petes
- Dave Pinkney Trophy (Goaltenders of team with lowest GAA) = Ted Ouimet, Montreal Junior Canadiens
- Max Kaminsky Trophy (Most gentlemanly player) = Andre Lacroix, Peterborough Petes

All Stars - First Team

- G: Ian Young, Oshawa Generals
- D: Bobby Orr, Oshawa Generals
- D: Jim McKenny, Toronto Marlboros
- C: Andre Lacroix, Peterborough Petes
- R: Mickey Redmond, Peterborough Petes
- L: Danny Grant, Peterborough Petes

All Stars - Second Team

- G: Brian Caley, Peterborough Petes, Rocky Farr, London Knights, and Bobby Ring, Niagara Falls Flyers (tied)
- D: Bart Crashley, Hamilton Red Wings
- D: Serge Savard, Montreal Junior Canadiens
- C: Derek Sanderson, Niagara Falls Flyers
- R: Jean Pronovost, Niagara Falls Flyers
- L: Don Marcotte, Niagara Falls Flyers

Team	GP	W	L	T	Pts	GF	GA
Peterborough Petes	48	24	14	10	58	211	171
Montreal Junior Canadiens	48	24	15	9	57	200	147
Niagara Falls Flyers	48	23	15	10	56	210	162
Oshawa Generals	48	22	18	8	52	217	178
Hamilton Red Wings	48	22	20	6	50	203	217
Toronto Marlboros	48	20	18	10	50	203	211
Kitchener Rangers	48	16	23	9	41	160	183
St. Catharines Black Hawks	48	15	26	7	37	182	231
London Nationals	48	12	29	7	31	149	235

== 1966–67 ==
The Kitchener Rangers finished first overall in the regular season, winning the Hamilton Spectator Trophy. The Toronto Marlboros won the J. Ross Robertson Cup.

Awards

- Red Tilson Trophy (Most outstanding player) = Mickey Redmond, Peterborough Petes
- Eddie Powers Memorial Trophy (Top scorer) = Derek Sanderson, Niagara Falls Flyers
- Dave Pinkney Trophy (Goaltenders of team with lowest GAA) = Peter McDuffe, St. Catharines Black Hawks
- Max Kaminsky Trophy (Most gentlemanly player) = Mickey Redmond, Peterborough Petes

All Stars - First Team

- G: Peter McDuffe, St. Catharines Black Hawks
- D: Brian Glennie, Toronto Marlboros
- D: Tom Reid, St. Catharines Black Hawks
- C: Derek Sanderson, Niagara Falls Flyers
- R: Mickey Redmond, Peterborough Petes
- L: Gerry Meehan, Toronto Marlboros

All Stars - Second Team

- G: Ian Young, Oshawa Generals
- D: Mike Robitaille, Kitchener Rangers
- D: Rick Smith, Hamilton Red Wings
- C: Walt Tkaczuk, Kitchener Rangers
- R: Tim Ecclestone, Kitchener Rangers
- L: John Vanderburg, Peterborough Petes

Team	GP	W	L	T	Pts	GF	GA
Kitchener Rangers	48	28	12	8	64	213	164
Niagara Falls Flyers	48	23	15	10	56	238	195
Toronto Marlboros	48	23	15	10	56	208	184
Hamilton Red Wings	48	22	21	5	49	172	161
St. Catharines Black Hawks	48	19	20	9	47	175	155
London Nationals	48	18	21	9	45	185	214
Montreal Junior Canadiens	48	16	23	9	41	176	204
Peterborough Petes	48	15	23	10	40	183	219
Oshawa Generals	48	12	26	10	34	138	192

== 1967–68 ==
The Ottawa 67's are granted a franchise. The Kitchener Rangers finished first overall in the regular season, winning the Hamilton Spectator Trophy. The Niagara Falls Flyers won the J. Ross Robertson Cup.

Awards

- Red Tilson Trophy (Most outstanding player) = Walt Tkaczuk, Kitchener Rangers
- Eddie Powers Memorial Trophy (Top scorer) = Tom Webster, Niagara Falls Flyers
- Dave Pinkney Trophy (Goaltenders of team with lowest GAA) = Jim Rutherford & Gerry Gray, Hamilton Red Wings
- Max Kaminsky Trophy (Most gentlemanly player) = Tom Webster, Niagara Falls Flyers

All Stars - First Team

- G: Gerry Gray, Hamilton Red Wings
- D: Mike Robitaille, Kitchener Rangers
- D: Rick Ley, Niagara Falls Flyers
- C: Walt Tkaczuk, Kitchener Rangers
- R: Danny Lawson, Hamilton Red Wings
- L: Jack Egers, Kitchener Rangers

All Stars - Second Team

- G: Phil Myre, Niagara Falls Flyers
- D: Brad Park, Toronto Marlboros
- D: Rick Smith, Hamilton Red Wings
- C: Terry Caffery, Toronto Marlboros
- R: Tom Webster, Niagara Falls Flyers
- L: Richie Bayes, Toronto Marlboros

Team	GP	W	L	T	Pts	GF	GA
Kitchener Rangers	54	38	10	6	82	326	175
Montreal Junior Canadiens	54	39	12	3	81	261	170
Hamilton Red Wings	54	31	13	10	72	253	162
Niagara Falls Flyers	54	32	15	7	71	255	169
Toronto Marlboros	54	31	17	6	68	273	179
St. Catharines Black Hawks	54	21	30	3	45	200	211
London Nationals	54	17	31	6	40	177	262
Peterborough Petes	54	13	30	11	37	183	243
Oshawa Generals	54	12	37	5	29	177	310
Ottawa 67's	54	6	45	3	15	105	329

== 1968–69 ==
The London Nationals become the London Knights. The Montreal Junior Canadiens finished first overall in the regular season, winning the Hamilton Spectator Trophy, and won the J. Ross Robertson Cup in the playoffs.

Awards

- Red Tilson Trophy (Most outstanding player) = Rejean Houle, Montreal Junior Canadiens
- Eddie Powers Memorial Trophy (Top scorer) = Rejean Houle, Montreal Junior Canadiens
- Dave Pinkney Trophy (Goaltenders of team with lowest GAA) = Wayne Wood & Ted Tucker, Montreal Junior Canadiens
- Max Kaminsky Trophy (Most gentlemanly player) = Rejean Houle, Montreal Junior Canadiens

All Stars - First Team

- G: Jim Rutherford, Hamilton Red Wings
- D: Dick Redmond, St. Catharines Black Hawks
- D: Randy Manery, Hamilton Red Wings
- C: Gilbert Perreault, Montreal Junior Canadiens
- R: Rejean Houle, Montreal Junior Canadiens
- L: Marc Tardif, Montreal Junior Canadiens

All Stars - Second Team

- G: Paul Hoganson, Toronto Marlboros
- D: Ron Stackhouse, Peterborough Petes
- D: Serge Lajeunesse, Montreal Junior Canadiens
- C: Darryl Sittler, London Knights
- R: Phil Roberto, Niagara Falls Flyers
- L: Don Tannahill, Niagara Falls Flyers

Team	GP	W	L	T	Pts	GF	GA
Montreal Junior Canadiens	54	37	11	6	80	303	171
St. Catharines Black Hawks	54	31	11	12	74	296	206
Peterborough Petes	54	27	18	9	63	222	193
Niagara Falls Flyers	54	28	24	2	58	223	229
Hamilton Red Wings	54	27	24	3	57	207	190
Toronto Marlboros	54	21	27	6	48	222	239
London Knights	54	19	26	9	47	242	258
Ottawa 67's	54	20	28	6	46	214	253
Oshawa Generals	54	18	28	8	44	233	268
Kitchener Rangers	54	9	40	5	23	155	310

== 1969–70 ==
The Max Kaminsky Trophy is rededicated, now awarded to the most outstanding defenceman in the league. The Montreal Junior Canadiens finished first overall in the regular season, winning the Hamilton Spectator Trophy, and won the J. Ross Robertson Cup in the playoffs.

Awards

- Red Tilson Trophy (Most outstanding player) = Gilbert Perreault, Montreal Junior Canadiens
- Eddie Powers Memorial Trophy (Top scorer) = Marcel Dionne, St. Catharines Black Hawks
- Dave Pinkney Trophy (Goaltenders of team with lowest GAA) = John Garrett, Peterborough Petes
- Max Kaminsky Trophy (Most outstanding defenceman) = Ron Plumb, Peterborough Petes

All Stars - First Team

- G: George Hulme, St. Catharines Black Hawks
- D: Ron Plumb, Peterborough Petes
- D: Bob Stewart, Oshawa Generals
- C: Gilbert Perreault, Montreal Junior Canadiens
- R: Al McDonough, St. Catharines Black Hawks
- L: Rick MacLeish, Peterborough Petes

All Stars - Second Team

- G: John Garrett, Peterborough Petes
- D: Steve Cuddie, Toronto Marlboros
- D: Jocelyn Guevremont and Serge Lajeunesse, Montreal Junior Canadiens (tied)
- C: Marcel Dionne, St. Catharines Black Hawks
- R: Buster Harvey, Hamilton Red Wings
- L: Robert Guindon, Montreal Junior Canadiens

Team	GP	W	L	T	Pts	GF	GA
Montreal Junior Canadiens	54	37	12	5	79	316	200
Peterborough Petes	54	29	13	12	70	240	172
St. Catharines Black Hawks	54	30	18	6	66	268	210
Toronto Marlboros	54	26	17	11	63	239	201
Ottawa 67's	54	21	23	10	52	213	206
London Knights	54	22	25	7	51	209	238
Kitchener Rangers	54	22	28	4	48	210	236
Oshawa Generals	54	17	27	10	44	213	252
Hamilton Red Wings	54	16	26	12	44	207	238
Niagara Falls Flyers	54	10	41	3	23	151	313

== 1970–71 ==
OHA president Tubby Schmalz was concerned with the level of physical play during the season, and personally interviewed four players to dissuade them from further on-ice misconduct. He submitted recommendations to the 1971 Canadian Amateur Hockey Association general meeting on behalf of the OHA to reduce the curvature of the hockey stick to one half inch for player safety. He also suggest to revert to the rectangular goal crease from the recent change to a semi-circle, since some rinks in his league were used by professional teams who used the old rules for the goal crease. Schmalz wanted to see consistency the application of the rules, and raise the standards for the level of instruction given to players. He instituted referee and coach clinics in the OHA, prior to it being mandated at the national level. In 1971, he sought to hire a technical director to conduct coaching and refereeing clinics across the province.

Schmalz announced that teams from the OHA and the Quebec Major Junior Hockey League would not play against any team from the Western Canada Hockey League (WCHL) for the 1971 Memorial Cup, due to disagreements over travel allowances given to team at the Memorial Cup and the higher number of over-age players allowed on WCHL rosters. He said that plans for an Eastern Canada series for the George Richardson Memorial Trophy would go ahead. As of the OHA playoffs, he reiterated that teams were still unanimous in their decision not to play for the Memorial Cup against WCHL teams. The Peterborough Petes finished first overall in the regular season, winning the Hamilton Spectator Trophy. The St. Catharines Black Hawks won the J. Ross Robertson Cup.

Awards

- Red Tilson Trophy (Most outstanding player) = Dave Gardner, Toronto Marlboros
- Eddie Powers Memorial Trophy (Top scorer) = Marcel Dionne, St. Catharines Black Hawks
- Dave Pinkney Trophy (Goaltenders of team with lowest GAA) = John Garrett, Peterborough Petes
- Max Kaminsky Trophy (Most outstanding defenceman) = Jocelyn Guevremont, Montreal Junior Canadiens

All Stars - First Team

- G: John Garrett, Peterborough Petes
- D: Denis Potvin, Ottawa 67's
- D: Jocelyn Guevremont, Montreal Junior Canadiens
- C: Marcel Dionne, St. Catharines Black Hawks
- R: Steve Vickers, Toronto Marlboros
- L: Rick Martin, Montreal Junior Canadiens

All Stars - Second Team

- G: Michel Larocque, Ottawa 67's
- D: Steve Durbano, Toronto Marlboros
- D: Rick Cunningham, Peterborough Petes
- C: Dave Gardner, Toronto Marlboros
- R: Bill Harris, Toronto Marlboros
- L: Steve Shutt, Toronto Marlboros

Team	GP	W	L	T	Pts	GF	GA
Peterborough Petes	62	41	13	8	90	290	174
St. Catharines Black Hawks	62	40	17	5	85	343	236
Ottawa 67's	62	38	18	6	82	302	212
Montreal Junior Canadiens	62	35	19	8	78	295	235
Toronto Marlboros	62	28	26	8	64	353	304
Kitchener Rangers	62	26	32	4	56	267	283
Hamilton Red Wings	62	22	35	5	49	224	328
London Knights	62	19	35	8	46	232	281
Oshawa Generals	62	18	37	7	46	232	316
Niagara Falls Flyers	62	11	44	7	29	193	350

== 1971–72 ==
Two new trophies are inaugurated for the 1971–72 season. The Matt Leyden Trophy is awarded for the Coach of the Year. The Jim Mahon Memorial Trophy is awarded for the top-scoring right winger. It was donated by the Peterborough Petes in memory of Jim Mahon, who died in the summer. The Toronto Marlboros finished first overall in the regular season, winning the Hamilton Spectator Trophy. The Peterborough Petes won the J. Ross Robertson Cup.

Awards

- Red Tilson Trophy (Most outstanding player) = Don Lever, Niagara Falls Flyers
- Eddie Powers Memorial Trophy (Top scorer) = Dave Gardner, Toronto Marlboros & Billy Harris, Toronto Marlboros
- Jim Mahon Memorial Trophy (Top-scoring right winger) = Billy Harris, Toronto Marlboros
- Dave Pinkney Trophy (Goaltenders of team with lowest GAA) = Michel Larocque, Ottawa 67's
- Max Kaminsky Trophy (Most outstanding defenceman) = Denis Potvin, Ottawa 67's
- Matt Leyden Trophy (Coach of the Year) = Gus Bodnar, Oshawa Generals

All Stars - First Team

- G: Michel Larocque, Ottawa 67's
- D: Denis Potvin, Ottawa 67's
- D: Paul Shakes, St. Catharines Black Hawks
- C: Don Lever, Niagara Falls Flyers
- R: Bill Harris, Toronto Marlboros
- L: Steve Shutt, Toronto Marlboros

All Stars - Second Team

- G: Gilles Gratton, Oshawa Generals
- D: Jim Schoenfeld, Niagara Falls Flyers
- D: Ian Turnbull, Montreal Junior Canadiens
- C: Dave Gardner, Toronto Marlboros
- R: Dennis Ververgaert, London Knights
- L: Randy Osburn, London Knights

Team	GP	W	L	T	Pts	GF	GA
Toronto Marlboros	63	45	15	3	93	363	256
Oshawa Generals	63	35	18	10	80	296	251
Peterborough Petes	63	34	20	9	77	292	227
Ottawa 67's	63	33	25	5	71	251	216
Kitchener Rangers	63	31	24	8	70	317	259
Niagara Falls Flyers	63	27	27	9	63	280	293
St. Catharines Black Hawks	63	25	31	7	57	258	311
London Knights	63	23	31	9	55	253	285
Montreal Junior Canadiens	63	13	40	10	36	237	315
Hamilton Red Wings	63	11	46	6	28	200	334

== 1972–73 ==
Junior A hockey is divided into "Tier I" and "Tier II." The OHA Junior A teams from 1972 became the Tier I division, also known as Major Junior hockey. The Montreal Junior Canadiens move to the QMJHL; the Niagara Falls Flyers move to Sudbury, becoming the Sudbury Wolves. The Sault Ste. Greyhounds are granted an expansion franchise. The Emms Family Award is donated to the OHA by Hap Emms, to be awarded to the Rookie of the Year. The Toronto Marlboros finished first overall in the regular season, winning the Hamilton Spectator Trophy, and won the J. Ross Robertson Cup in the playoffs.

Awards

- Red Tilson Trophy (Most outstanding player) = Rick Middleton, Oshawa Generals
- Eddie Powers Memorial Trophy (Top scorer) = Blake Dunlop, Ottawa 67's
- Jim Mahon Memorial Trophy (Top-scoring right winger) = Dennis Ververgaert, London Knights
- Dave Pinkney Trophy (Goaltenders of team with lowest GAA) = Mike Palmateer, Toronto Marlboros
- Max Kaminsky Trophy (Most outstanding defenceman) = Denis Potvin, Ottawa 67's
- Emms Family Award (Rookie of the Year) = Dennis Maruk, London Knights
- Matt Leyden Trophy (Coach of the Year) = George Armstrong, Toronto Marlboros

All Stars - First Team

- G: Mike Palmateer, Toronto Marlboros
- D: Denis Potvin, Ottawa 67's
- D: Bob Dailey, Toronto Marlboros
- C: Reg Thomas, London Knights
- R: Dennis Ververgaert, London Knights
- L: Morris Titanic, Sudbury Wolves

All Stars - Second Team

- G: Peter Crosbie, London Knights, & Rick St. Croix, Oshawa Generals
- D: Ian Turnbull, Ottawa 67's
- D: Bob Neely, Peterborough Petes
- C: Blake Dunlop, Ottawa 67's
- R: Rick Middleton, Oshawa Generals
- L: Bill Lochead, Oshawa Generals

Team	GP	W	L	T	Pts	GF	GA
Toronto Marlboros	63	47	7	9	103	416	199
Peterborough Petes	63	42	13	8	92	330	234
Ottawa 67's	63	41	15	7	89	391	243
London Knights	63	33	22	8	74	334	246
St. Catharines Black Hawks	63	24	28	11	59	280	318
Oshawa Generals	63	23	32	8	54	295	310
Sudbury Wolves	63	21	32	10	52	289	379
Kitchener Rangers	63	16	41	6	38	244	368
Hamilton Red Wings	63	15	41	7	37	244	374
Sault Ste. Marie Greyhounds	63	11	42	10	32	244	396

== 1973–74 ==
The Kingston Canadians are granted a franchise. The Kitchener Rangers finished first overall in the regular season, winning the Hamilton Spectator Trophy. The St. Catharines Black Hawks won the J. Ross Robertson Cup. The OHA became the OMJHL for the 1974–75 OMJHL season.

Awards

- Red Tilson Trophy (Most outstanding player) = Jack Valiquette, Sault Ste. Marie Greyhounds
- Eddie Powers Memorial Trophy (Top scorer) = Jack Valiquette, Sault Ste. Marie Greyhounds & Rick Adduono, St. Catharines Black Hawks
- Jim Mahon Memorial Trophy (Top-scoring right winger) = Dave Gorman, St. Catharines Black Hawks
- Dave Pinkney Trophy (Goaltenders of team with lowest GAA) = Don Edwards, Kitchener Rangers
- Max Kaminsky Trophy (Most outstanding defenceman) = Jim Turkiewicz, Peterborough Petes
- Emms Family Award (Rookie of the Year) = Jack Valiquette, Sault Ste. Marie Greyhounds
- Matt Leyden Trophy (Coach of the Year) = Jack Bownass, Kingston Canadians

All Stars - First Team

- G: Don Edwards, Kitchener Rangers
- D: Jim Turkiewicz, Peterborough Petes
- D: Rick Chartraw, Kitchener Rangers
- C: Jack Valiquette, Sault Ste. Marie Greyhounds
- R: Wilf Paiement, St. Catharines Black Hawks
- L: Bill Lochead, Oshawa Generals

All Stars - Second Team

- G: Mike Kasmetis, Peterborough Petes
- D: Dave Maloney, Kitchener Rangers
- D: Paul McIntosh, Peterborough Petes
- C: Bruce Boudreau, Toronto Marlboros
- R: Dave Gorman, St. Catharines Black Hawks
- L: Mike Marson, Sudbury Wolves

Team	GP	W	L	T	Pts	GF	GA
Kitchener Rangers	70	43	18	9	95	377	229
St. Catharines Black Hawks	70	41	23	6	88	358	278
Peterborough Petes	70	35	21	14	84	255	230
London Knights	70	36	27	7	79	282	250
Sudbury Wolves	70	31	26	13	75	298	288
Oshawa Generals	70	33	29	8	74	283	275
Ottawa 67's	70	30	31	9	69	293	276
Toronto Marlboros	70	30	31	9	69	293	276
Sault Ste. Marie Greyhounds	70	24	40	6	54	295	352
Kingston Canadians	70	20	43	7	47	256	378
Hamilton Red Wings	70	16	49	5	37	221	376

== Bibliography ==
- Elk, Herb (1968). 1967-68 Pro and Senior Hockey Guide. St. Louis: The Sporting News.
- Elk, Herb (1968). 1968-69 Pro and Senior Hockey Guide. St. Louis: The Sporting News.
- Elk, Herb (1969). 1969-70 Pro and Senior Hockey Guide. St. Louis: The Sporting News.
- Elk, Herb (1970). 1970-71 Pro and Senior Hockey Guide. St. Louis: The Sporting News.
- Elk, Herb (1971). 1971-72 Pro and Senior Hockey Guide. St. Louis: The Sporting News.
- Elk, Herb (1972). 1972-73 Pro and Amateur Hockey Guide. St. Louis: The Sporting News.
- Elk, Herb (1972). 1972-73 Hockey Register. St. Louis: The Sporting News.
- Elk, Herb; Wigge, Larry; Marcin, Joe (1973). 1973-74 Pro and Amateur Hockey Guide. St. Louis: The Sporting News.
- Elk, Herb; Wigge, Larry; Marcin, Joe (1973). 1973-74 Hockey Register. St. Louis: The Sporting News.
- Elk, Herb; Wigge, Larry; Marcin, Joe (1974). 1974-75 Pro and Amateur Hockey Guide. St. Louis: The Sporting News.
- Elk, Herb; Wigge, Larry; Marcin, Joe (1974). 1974-75 Hockey Register. St. Louis: The Sporting News.
