= Ridgeville, Ontario =

Ridgeville
- Unincorporated community
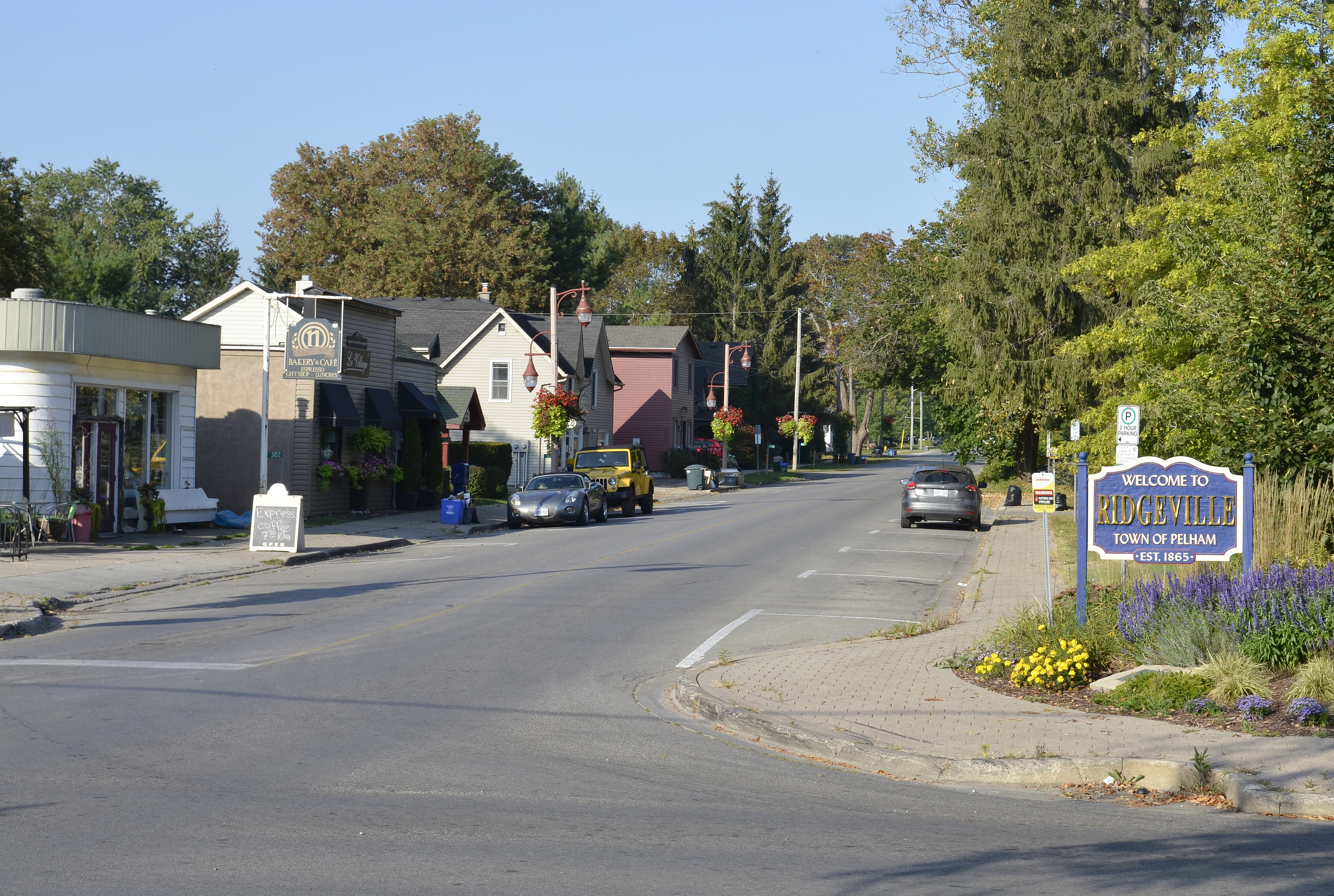
- Looking west on Canboro Road in Ridgeville
- Interactive map of Ridgeville
- Coordinates: 43°2′15″N 79°18′40″W
- Country: Canada
- Province: Ontario
- Regional municipality: Niagara
- Town: Pelham
- Time zone: UTC-5 (EST)
  - Summer (DST): UTC-4 (EDT)
- Forward sortation area: L0S 1M0
- Area codes: 905 and 289
- NTS Map: 30M3 Niagara
- GNBC Code: FCLBD

Ridgeville is a community within the town of Pelham, Ontario, in Canada. It borders the western limit of Fonthill. It derives its name from its location on the south western ridge of the Fonthill Kame. It has a post office, a rural mail route named Ridgeville, a small number of shops found along Canboro Road, including a bakery, chocolate shop and specialty home and bath shops, the local high school, Gwennol Organic Blueberry Farm and the Ridge Berry Farm Tea Room.

It is located on what was formerly known as traditional Neutral, Haudenosaunee, and Anishnaabe territory.

== Climate ==
The climate is warm-summer humid continental (Köppen: Dfb). The community serves as the basis for Pelham's normals.

Climate data for Ridgeville, elevation: 236.2 m or 775 ft, 1981-2010 normals, extremes 1950-2006
Month	Jan	Feb	Mar	Apr	May	Jun	Jul	Aug	Sep	Oct	Nov	Dec	Year
Record high °C (°F)	17.0 (62.6)	19.5 (67.1)	26.0 (78.8)	32.0 (89.6)	33.0 (91.4)	33.0 (91.4)	35.5 (95.9)	35.0 (95.0)	33.9 (93.0)	29.4 (84.9)	25.0 (77.0)	20.0 (68.0)	35.5 (95.9)
Mean daily maximum °C (°F)	−1.3 (29.7)	0.0 (32.0)	4.5 (40.1)	11.8 (53.2)	18.5 (65.3)	23.4 (74.1)	26.0 (78.8)	25.0 (77.0)	20.9 (69.6)	14.1 (57.4)	7.8 (46.0)	1.7 (35.1)	12.7 (54.9)
Daily mean °C (°F)	−4.4 (24.1)	−3.3 (26.1)	0.7 (33.3)	7.3 (45.1)	13.6 (56.5)	18.9 (66.0)	21.7 (71.1)	20.9 (69.6)	16.9 (62.4)	10.5 (50.9)	4.7 (40.5)	−1.2 (29.8)	8.9 (47.9)
Mean daily minimum °C (°F)	−7.5 (18.5)	−6.7 (19.9)	−3.1 (26.4)	2.7 (36.9)	8.6 (47.5)	14.3 (57.7)	17.4 (63.3)	16.7 (62.1)	12.9 (55.2)	6.9 (44.4)	1.6 (34.9)	−4.0 (24.8)	5.0 (41.0)
Record low °C (°F)	−25.5 (−13.9)	−24.4 (−11.9)	−21.0 (−5.8)	−11.7 (10.9)	−3.5 (25.7)	2.8 (37.0)	5.0 (41.0)	5.0 (41.0)	1.1 (34.0)	−3.9 (25.0)	−12.2 (10.0)	−26.0 (−14.8)	−26.0 (−14.8)
Average precipitation mm (inches)	67.1 (2.64)	53.6 (2.11)	64.2 (2.53)	77.7 (3.06)	89.2 (3.51)	84.7 (3.33)	83.6 (3.29)	77.6 (3.06)	92.6 (3.65)	86.3 (3.40)	90.7 (3.57)	78.9 (3.11)	946.2 (37.26)
Average rainfall mm (inches)	32.7 (1.29)	30.9 (1.22)	45.2 (1.78)	72.3 (2.85)	88.7 (3.49)	84.7 (3.33)	83.6 (3.29)	77.6 (3.06)	92.6 (3.65)	86.1 (3.39)	80.7 (3.18)	53.6 (2.11)	828.7 (32.64)
Average snowfall cm (inches)	34.3 (13.5)	24.0 (9.4)	19.0 (7.5)	5.4 (2.1)	0.5 (0.2)	0.0 (0.0)	0.0 (0.0)	0.0 (0.0)	0.0 (0.0)	0.2 (0.1)	6.6 (2.6)	25.3 (10.0)	115.3 (45.4)
Average precipitation days (≥ 0.2 mm)	11.6	8.4	10.1	11.6	12.0	10.5	9.9	9.4	9.9	11.4	11.7	11.7	128.2
Average rainy days (≥ 0.2 mm)	5.2	4.1	7.4	10.9	12.0	10.5	9.9	9.4	9.9	11.4	10.4	7.4	108.5
Average snowy days (≥ 0.2 cm)	6.8	4.8	3.4	1.2	0.08	0.0	0.0	0.0	0.0	0.04	1.6	5.4	23.32
Source: Environment Canada
