= Matt Johnson (ice hockey) =

Canadian ice hockey player (born 1975)

Matthew Johnson
- Born: November 23, 1975 (age 50) Welland, Ontario, Canada
- Height: 6 ft 5 in (196 cm)
- Weight: 245 lb (111 kg; 17 st 7 lb)
- Position: Left wing
- Shot: Left
- Played for: Los Angeles Kings; Atlanta Thrashers; Minnesota Wild
- NHL draft: 33rd overall, 1994; Los Angeles Kings
- Playing career: 1994–2004

Matt Johnson (born November 23, 1975) is a Canadian former professional ice hockey left winger. He played parts of 10 seasons as an enforcer in the National Hockey League (NHL) with the Los Angeles Kings, Atlanta Thrashers and the Minnesota Wild. Johnson was born in Welland, Ontario, and raised in nearby Fenwick. He was known by Wild fans as Moose.

== Playing career ==
Due to his great size and power forward abilities, many NHL scouts took great interest in Johnson. He was drafted in the second round, 33rd overall, by the Los Angeles Kings in the 1994 NHL entry draft.

After two-plus seasons in the Ontario Hockey League with the Peterborough Petes, Johnson joined the Kings during the 1994–95 season. During the 1998–99 season, Johnson was suspended for twelve games for sucker-punching Jeff Beukeboom in the back of the head. He remained a member of the Kings until he was chosen by the Atlanta Thrashers in the 1999 NHL expansion draft. On November 17, 1999, Johnson scored 10 seconds after teammate Andrew Brunette in a 5-4 victory over the Tampa Bay Lightning to mark the then two quickest goals in Franchise history. After just one season with the Thrashers, he joined another expansion team, the Minnesota Wild, for the 2000–01 season. He was named team captain of the Wild in December 2002. Johnson played four seasons with the Wild and, to date, has had no NHL experience since the end of the 2003–04 season.

During the 2004-05 NHL lockout, Johnson decided that he did not want to play hockey anymore. In an interview with a Minnesota newspaper, he explained that his shoulder (which was reconstructed during that off-season) had been feeling great and after a few months of no hockey, he would wake up in the morning with no pain or constant aches like he had when he played. He decided that he did not want to go back to being an enforcer, and a few days later, the Wild organization bought out the final two years of his contract and today he remains unofficially retired.

Johnson moved in with his parents at their farm in Pelham, Ontario during the 2005 lockout. Johnson struggled with difficulties adjusting to life after hockey. His erratic behavior eventually led to his family attempting to enroll him in rehab in spring of 2006. As of December 2017, Johnson is estranged from his family and homeless, his last known location living on the streets of Santa Monica, California. For nearly a decade, Johnson had been missing but resurfaced on December 31, 2017 in an altercation at a Santa Monica Denny's.

In his NHL career, Johnson appeared in 473 games, tallying 23 goals and adding 20 assists. In addition, he recorded 1,523 penalty minutes. He also appeared in 16 Stanley Cup playoff games, going scoreless with 31 penalty minutes.

== Career statistics ==
			Regular season					Playoffs
Season	Team	League	GP	G	A	Pts	PIM	GP	G	A	Pts	PIM
1991–92	Welland Aerostars	GHL	38	6	9	15	214	—	—	—	—	—
1991–92	Ajax Axemen	CJHL	1	0	0	0	0	—	—	—	—	—
1992–93	Peterborough Petes	OHL	66	8	17	25	211	16	1	1	2	54
1993–94	Peterborough Petes	OHL	50	13	24	37	233	—	—	—	—	—
1994–95	Peterborough Petes	OHL	14	1	2	3	43	—	—	—	—	—
1994–95	Los Angeles Kings	NHL	14	1	0	1	102	—	—	—	—	—
1995–96	Los Angeles Kings	NHL	1	0	0	0	5	—	—	—	—	—
1995–96	Phoenix Roadrunners	IHL	29	4	4	8	87	—	—	—	—	—
1996–97	Los Angeles Kings	NHL	52	1	3	4	194	—	—	—	—	—
1997–98	Los Angeles Kings	NHL	66	2	4	6	249	4	0	0	0	6
1998–99	Los Angeles Kings	NHL	49	2	1	3	131	—	—	—	—	—
1999–2000	Atlanta Thrashers	NHL	64	2	5	7	144	—	—	—	—	—
2000–01	Minnesota Wild	NHL	50	1	1	2	137	—	—	—	—	—
2001–02	Minnesota Wild	NHL	60	4	0	4	183	—	—	—	—	—
2002–03	Minnesota Wild	NHL	60	3	5	8	201	12	0	0	0	25
2003–04	Minnesota Wild	NHL	57	7	1	8	177	—	—	—	—	—
NHL totals			473	23	20	43	1523	16	0	0	0	31

Awards and achievements
Preceded by Brad Bombardir	Minnesota Wild captain December 2002	Succeeded by Sergei Zholtok
