= Coyle Creek =

River in Ontario, Canada

- Location of the mouth of Coyle Creek in southern Ontario

Location
- Country: Canada
- Province: Ontario
- Region: Southern Ontario
- Regional Municipality: Niagara
- Municipalities: Welland; Pelham; West Lincoln

Physical characteristics
- Mouth: Welland River
  - coordinates: 42°58′53″N 79°17′22″W
  - elevation: 175 m (574 ft)

Basin features
- River system: Great Lakes Basin

Coyle Creek is a small creek in the municipalities of Welland, Pelham, and West Lincoln in Ontario, Canada, that forms an important component of the Welland River watershed. The last section of the creek constitutes an oasis of wild habitat in an otherwise increasingly developed area; the upper section of the creek runs through a golf course.

The creek contains numerous fish species, including largemouth bass, northern pike, crappie, channel catfish, sunfish, and various species of minnow. As well, mud puppies are present in the creek. The surrounding woods are home to a wide variety of wildlife, including beavers, which are comparatively rare in Southern Ontario due to habitat loss.

== See also ==
- List of rivers of Ontario
