= Kame =

Mound formed on a retreating glacier and deposited on land

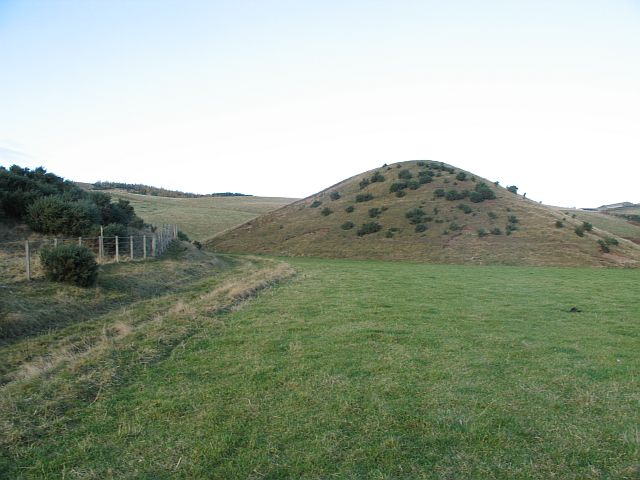
A kame near Kirriemuir, Scotland

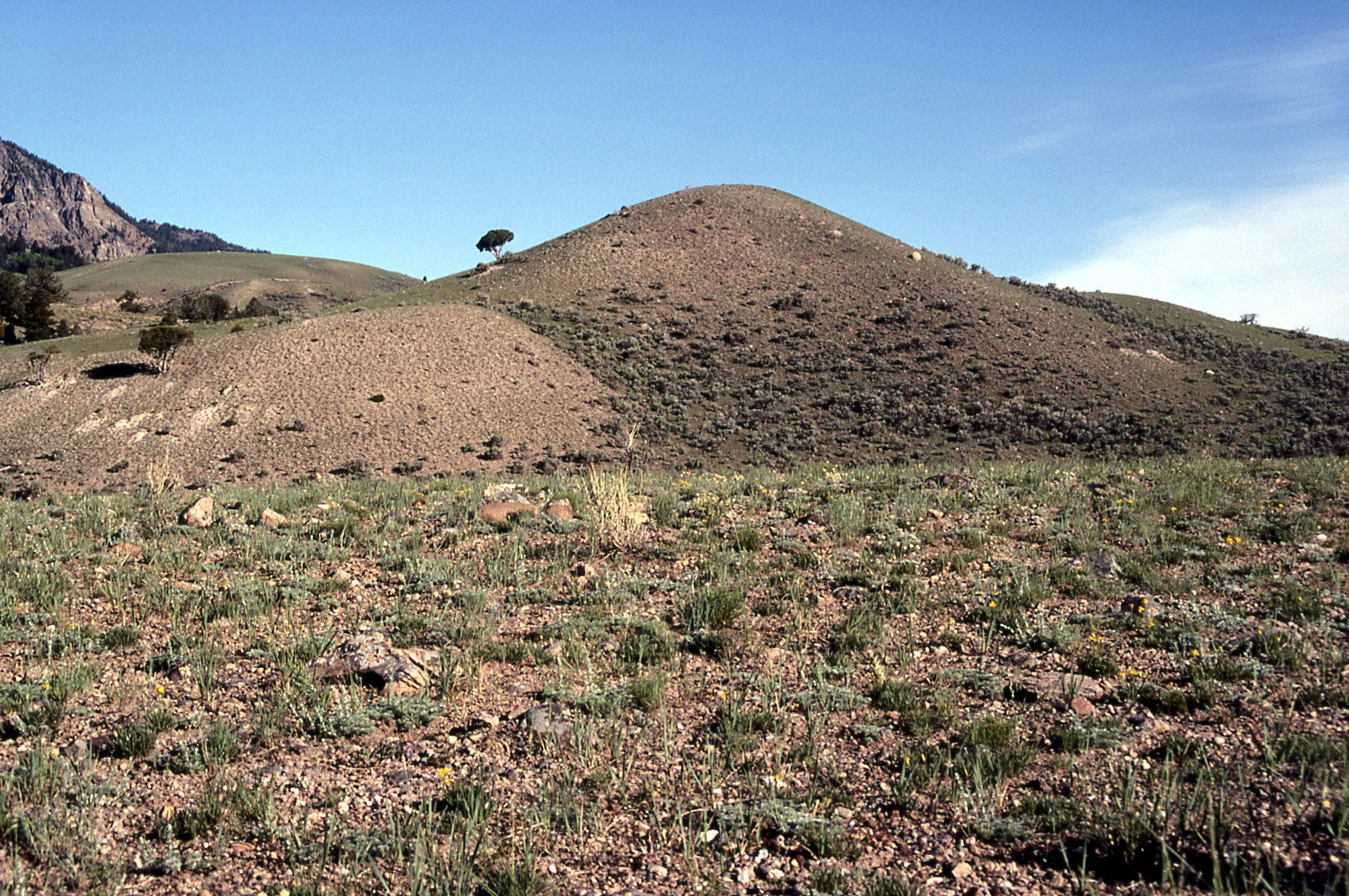
A kame in Yellowstone National Park, Wyoming

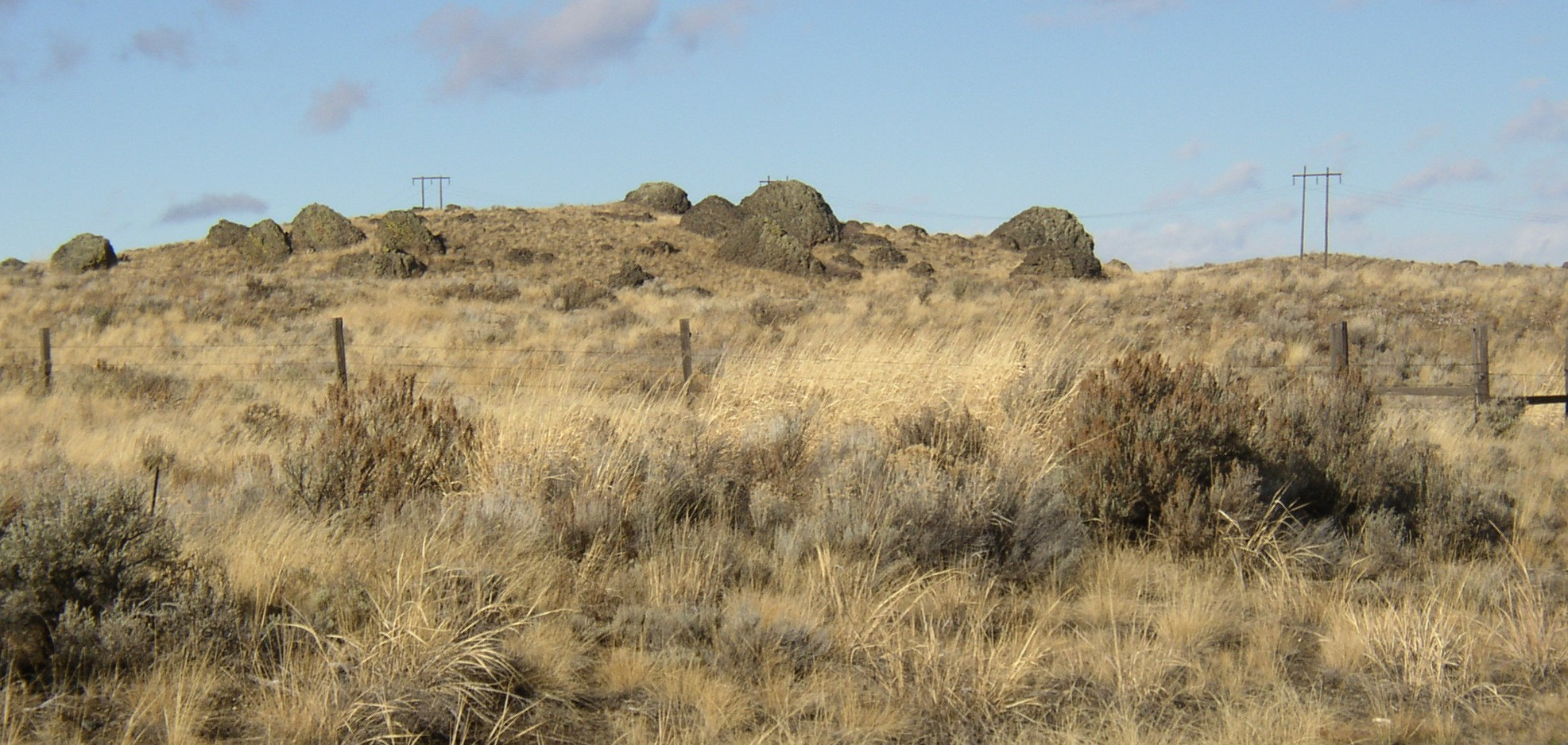
A kame among the glacial drift on the terminal moraine of the Okanagan Lobe of the Cordilleran Ice Sheet on the Waterville Plateau of the Columbia Plateau in Washington

A kame, or knob, is a glacial landform, an irregularly shaped hill or mound composed of sand, gravel and till that accumulates in a depression on a retreating glacier, and is then deposited on the land surface with further melting of the glacier. Kames are often associated with kettles, and this is referred to as kame and kettle or knob and kettle topography. The word kame is a variant of comb (kame, or kaim is the Old Scottish word meaning 'comb'), which has the meaning "crest" among others. The geological term was introduced by Thomas Jamieson in 1874.

According to White, "kames were formed by meltwater which deposited more or less washed material at irregular places in and along melting ice. At places the material is very well washed and stratified; at others it is more poorly washed, with inclusions of till masses that fell from ice but were covered before they were completely washed. Kame gravels thus tend to be variable and range from fine to coarse grained and even to cobbly and boulder."

With the melting of the glacier, streams carry sediment to glacial lakes, building kame deltas on top of the ice. However, with the continuous melting of the glacier, the kame delta eventually collapses onto the land surface, furthering the "kame and kettle" topography.

Kame terraces are frequently found along the side of a glacial valley and are stratified deposits of meltwater streams flowing between the ice and the adjacent valley side. These kame terraces tend to look like long, flat benches, with many pits on the surface made by kettles. They tend to slope downvalley with gradients similar to the glacier surface along which they formed, and can sometimes be found paired on opposite sides of a valley.

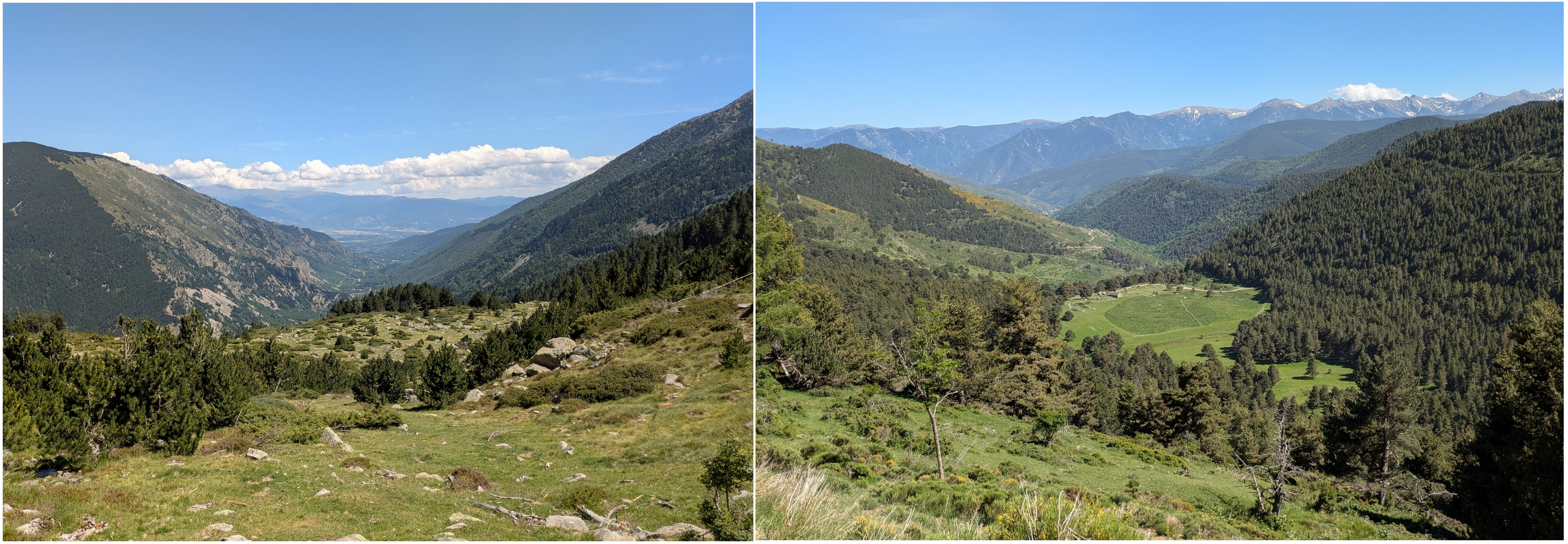
Kame terraces in the eastern Pyrenees of France: Montfillà (left), above the Porta valley, Cerdagne; and Pla de l'Orri (right), above the Cabrils valley, Conflent

Kames are sometimes compared to drumlins, but their formation is distinctively different. A drumlin is not originally shaped by meltwater, but by the ice itself and has a quite regular shape. It occurs in fine-grained material, such as clay or shale, not in sands and gravels. And drumlins usually have concentric layers of material, as the ice successively plasters new layers in its movement.

== Examples ==
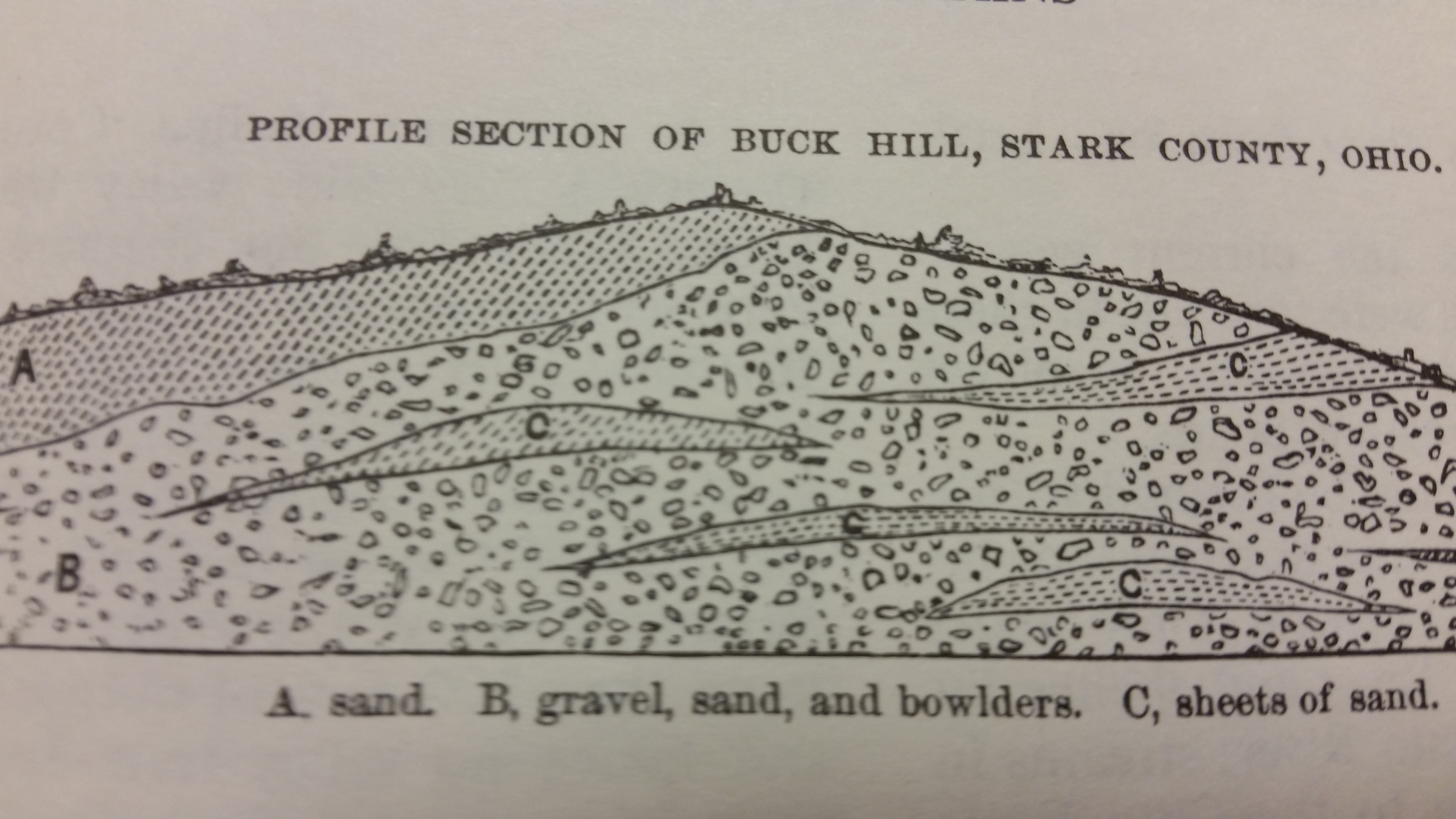
Kame internal structure as sketched by Newberry in 1874

Kames are not normally located in proximity to one another, however in Edmonton, Alberta, numerous kames are found nearby, forming the Prosser Archaeological Site. The Fonthill Kame in southern Ontario is in a densely populated area. Examples can also be found in Wisconsin and at the Sims Corner Eskers and Kames National Natural Landscape in Washington. They are also located in Mendon Ponds Park, southeast of Rochester, New York. This park is on the National Registry of Natural Landmarks due to geological history and presence of significant kames, eskers and kettles.

In Ontario, there are two provincial parks, both designated as IUCN nature reserves, which were created to protect important and undisturbed kame features. They are Minnitaki Kames Provincial Park and Bonheur River Kame Provincial Park.

== See also ==
- Drumlin
- Esker
- Glacial Kame culture
- Glacial landforms
- Moraine
- Outwash fan
