= Conor Timmins =

Canadian ice hockey player (born 1998)

- Born: September 18, 1998 (age 27) St. Catharines, Ontario, Canada
- Height: 6 ft 2 in (188 cm)
- Weight: 213 lb (97 kg; 15 st 3 lb)
- Position: Defence
- Shoots: Right
- NHL team Former teams: Buffalo Sabres; Colorado Avalanche; Arizona Coyotes; Toronto Maple Leafs; Pittsburgh Penguins
- NHL draft: 32nd overall, 2017; Colorado Avalanche
- Playing career: 2019–present

Conor Timmins (born September 18, 1998) is a Canadian professional ice hockey player who is a defenceman for the Buffalo Sabres of the National Hockey League (NHL). He was selected by the Colorado Avalanche, 32nd overall, in the 2017 NHL entry draft.

== Playing career ==
=== Junior ===
Timmins played minor midget with the Southern Tier Admirals of the South-Central Triple A Hockey League. He was selected in the 4th round (79th overall) of the 2014 OHL Priority Selection by the Sault Ste. Marie Greyhounds. Timmins started his first season of junior hockey with the Thorold Blackhawks of the Greater Ontario Junior Hockey League before being traded to the St. Catharines Falcons. He debuted for the Greyhounds in the 2015–16 season, scoring 13 points in 60 games.

In the 2016–17 season, Timmins scored 61 points (7 goals and 54 assists) and played in the CHL/NHL Top Prospects Game. Going into the 2017 NHL entry draft, Timmins was ranked the 18th best North American skater by NHL Central Scouting. He was taken by the Colorado Avalanche with the first selection of the second round (32nd overall). Timmins returned to the Greyhounds for the 2017–18 season, scoring 41 points (8 goals, 33 assists) in 36 games. He signed a three-year, entry-level contract with the Avalanche on March 2, 2018.

=== Professional ===
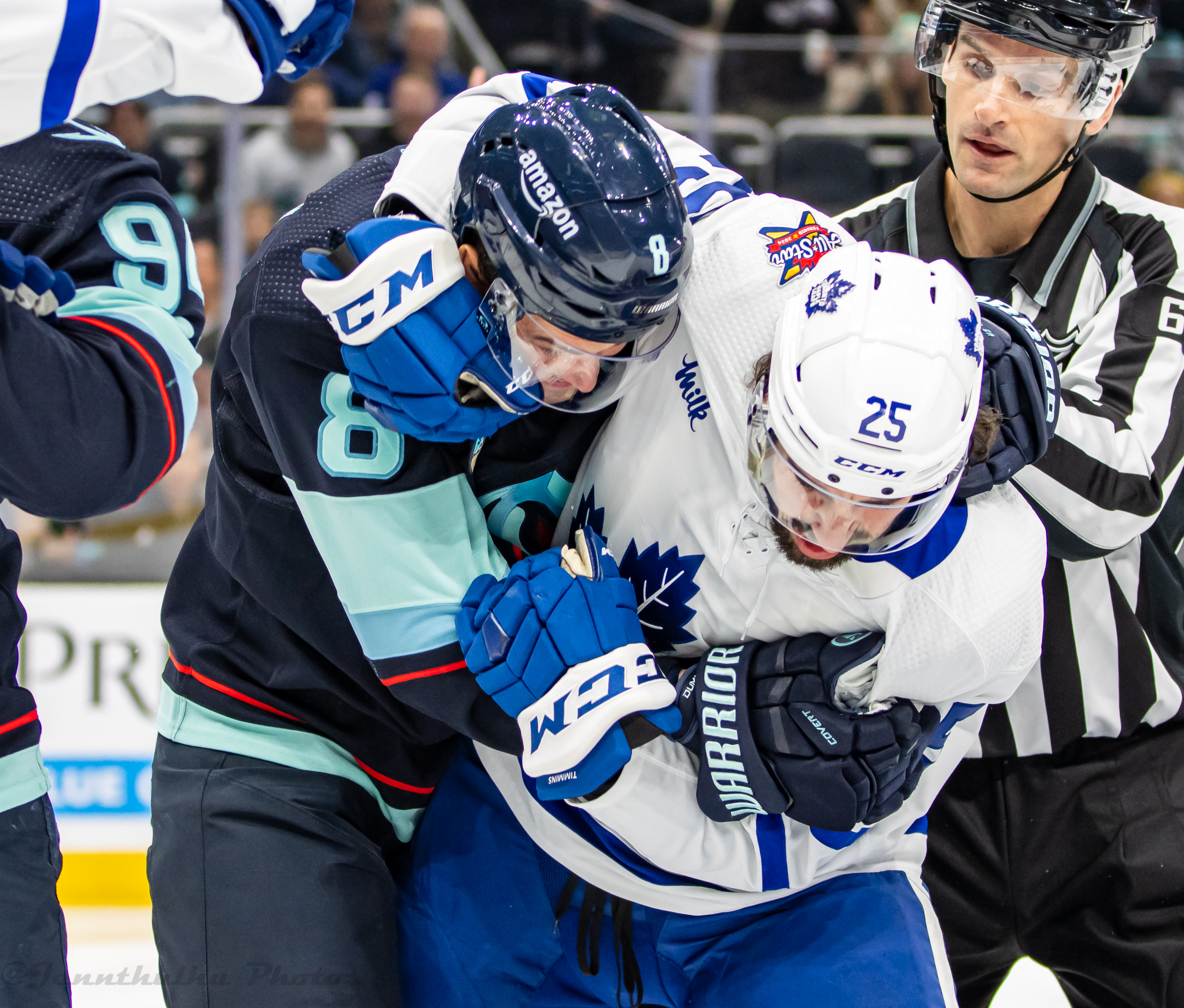
Timmins wrestling with Brian Dumoulin of the Seattle Kraken in 2024.

Timmins suffered a concussion at the end of his final season in junior hockey, and he continued to have symptoms that kept him from playing in any games for the Avalanche or their American Hockey League (AHL) affiliate, the Colorado Eagles in the 2018–19 season.

On October 1, 2019, the Avalanche announced that Timmins had made the opening-night roster. He made his NHL debut on the Avalanche's third defensive pairing in a 5–3 season opening victory over the Calgary Flames on October 3, 2019. After his second game with the Avalanche, Timmins was reassigned to the Colorado Eagles on October 7, 2019.

At the conclusion of his entry-level contract, as a restricted free agent, Timmins was traded by the Avalanche along with a first-round selection in 2022 and conditional third-round draft selection in 2024 to the Arizona Coyotes in exchange for starting goaltender Darcy Kuemper on July 28, 2021. He was later signed by the Coyotes, to a two-year, $1.7 million contract extension on August 6, 2021. Six games into his tenure with Arizona, Timmins suffered a knee injury that required season ending surgery.

Returning to health to open the 2022–23 season with the Coyotes, Timmins appeared in two games before suffering another injury on October 15, 2022. On November 8, Timmins was re-assigned on a conditioning assignment to AHL affiliate, the Tucson Roadrunners, appearing in six games registering three assists. In returning to the Coyotes following completion of his conditioning re-assignment, Timmins was traded by Arizona to the Toronto Maple Leafs in exchange for Curtis Douglas on November 23, 2022. He made his Maple Leafs debut on December 6, 2022 against the Dallas Stars after spending time with Toronto's development team. He picked up eight assists in his first ten games with the Maple Leafs. Timmins scored his first career NHL goal on January 8, 2023 in a 6–2 win over the Philadelphia Flyers. Timmins' play was good enough to warrant Maple Leafs' management to sign him to a two-year contract on February 9 ahead of restricted free agency. However, after the NHL trade deadline and the acquisition of veteran defencemen, Timmins was pushed out of the lineup by the 2023 Stanley Cup playoffs.

Timmins had an excellent 2023 training camp, leading the league in pre-season scoring. However, he suffered an undisclosed injury in a pre-season game versus Montreal on September 29, 2023. He was placed on injured reserve and was not activated until November 24 and made his season debut that night versus the Chicago Blackhawks.

Entering his final season under contract with the Maple Leafs, in 2024–25, Timmins assumed third-pairing duties while in the midst of his first injury-free professional season. Having established a season high with 51 appearances, due to salary cap roster implications Timmins was traded by the Maple Leafs alongside Connor Dewar to the Pittsburgh Penguins in exchange for a fifth-round selection in 2025 on March 7, 2025. In an increased offensive role on the blueline with the Penguins, Timmins posted 1 goal and 7 points through 17 games to end the season.

As a pending restricted free agent, on June 28, 2025, at the 2025 NHL entry draft, Timmins was again on the move after he was traded by the Penguins alongside Isaac Belliveau to the Buffalo Sabres in exchange for Connor Clifton and a second-round selection. He was later signed to a two-year, $4.4 million contract extension with the Sabres on July 27, 2025.

== International play ==
Medal record

Representing Canada

Ice hockey

World Junior Championships
Gold medal – first place	2018 United States	

Timmins was selected to Canada's under-20 team for the 2018 World Junior Championships in Buffalo, New York, winning gold. He scored 5 points in the tournament, including an assist on the game-winning goal in the gold-medal game. He also led the tournament in plus/minus at +15.

== Career statistics ==
=== Regular season and playoffs ===
			Regular season					Playoffs
Season	Team	League	GP	G	A	P	PIM	GP	G	A	P	PIM
2013–14	Southern Tier Admirals	SCTAMM	38	4	18	22	39	10	2	2	4	6
2014–15	Thorold Blackhawks	GOJHL	15	2	8	10	28	—	—	—	—	—
2014–15	St. Catharines Falcons	GOJHL	15	5	3	8	12	13	3	5	8	6
2015–16	Sault Ste. Marie Greyhounds	OHL	60	4	9	13	20	12	0	1	1	6
2016–17	Sault Ste. Marie Greyhounds	OHL	67	7	54	61	69	11	1	7	8	10
2017–18	Sault Ste. Marie Greyhounds	OHL	36	8	33	41	43	23	5	13	18	16
2019–20	Colorado Avalanche	NHL	2	0	0	0	0	2	0	0	0	4
2019–20	Colorado Eagles	AHL	40	3	24	27	38	—	—	—	—	—
2020–21	Colorado Avalanche	NHL	31	0	7	7	8	10	0	0	0	0
2020–21	Colorado Eagles	AHL	6	1	3	4	4	—	—	—	—	—
2021–22	Arizona Coyotes	NHL	6	0	0	0	0	—	—	—	—	—
2022–23	Arizona Coyotes	NHL	2	0	0	0	0	—	—	—	—	—
2022–23	Tucson Roadrunners	AHL	6	0	3	3	12	—	—	—	—	—
2022–23	Toronto Maple Leafs	NHL	25	2	12	14	8	—	—	—	—	—
2023–24	Toronto Maple Leafs	NHL	25	1	9	10	18	—	—	—	—	—
2024–25	Toronto Maple Leafs	NHL	51	2	6	8	24	—	—	—	—	—
2024–25	Pittsburgh Penguins	NHL	17	1	6	7	6	—	—	—	—	—
2025–26	Buffalo Sabres	NHL	39	0	8	8	18	13	0	2	2	8
NHL totals			198	6	48	54	82	25	0	2	2	12

=== International ===
Year	Team	Event	Result	GP	G	A	Pts	PIM
2018	Canada	WJC	1st place, gold medalist(s)	7	1	4	5	4
Junior totals				7	1	4	5	4
