= Sun Valley Gardens =

Former Canadian naturist resort

Sun Valley Gardens (SVG) was a nudist club that existed from 1954 to 1982 in Pelham, Ontario, Canada (the Niagara Falls region). The property was a 10-hectare (25-acre) site between the communities of North Pelham and Pelham Union, 8 km (5 miles) north of Fenwick. Just two years in, a number of facilities had already been built by the members.

In 1961, Sun Valley Gardens was used as one of the locations for a Canadian exploitation drama movie, Have Figure, Will Travel, directed by Leo Orenstein, with club owner Karl Ruehle acting as an advisor to the movie and playing a bit part.

SVG had a significant impact on Ontario's nudist/naturist scene. Almost every existing club in Southern Ontario (and a few that have since closed) in some way owe their existence to former members of SVG. The reason that so many left to start their own club is that Ruehle was alleged to have been a particularly autocratic and tight-fisted individual—a characterization disputed by his son Michael, who asserts that disagreement over club policies played more of a role in rifts than Karl Ruehle's admittedly hard-headed nature. But Ruehle was very supportive of those who wanted to start their own club. He even ran an "indoctrination school for prospective camp operators".

The original 25-acre site remains nearly untouched from when it closed in 1982. Photos taken in 2020 show derelict structures being swallowed by surrounding woodland, and the club's distinctive kidney-shaped pool still holding water, albeit overtaken by algae.
