= Fonthill Kame =

Moraine in Niagara Peninsula, Canada

Coordinates: 43.0523°N 79.3095°W

The Fonthill Kame is a geological feature in the Niagara Peninsula in Pelham, Ontario, Canada. A kame is a moraine in the form of a large, isolated hill. It is composed of sand and gravel deposited by the retreating glaciers of the last ice age. The Fonthill Kame rises about 75 m (246 ft) above the surrounding land (259 m above sea level) and is the highest elevation in the region. Some sources say that the kame is no longer the highest point owing to the removal of sand and gravel. Despite what some sources may say, the kame is simply the highest natural geographic feature in Niagara and the highest point would remain on the kame. There is some debate about the actual highest point though because locals seem to remember a plaque in a farmers field, south of Tice Road and East on Effingham Road, on un-excavated land that marked the highest point.

The kame is 6 km (4 mi) east to west and 3 km (2 mi) north to south. It slopes gradually on the west side, more steeply on the south and east and merges with the Short Hills Provincial Park area of the Niagara Escarpment on the north.

The Fonthill Kame has considerable influence on the climate of Pelham by sheltering it from the winds from the southwest. This provides good growing conditions for fruit crops, including the vines that supply the local wine industry. It is also mined for sand and gravel.

Research on the kame centres on its hydrogeological features, which are important to the Niagara Peninsula. The Government of Ontario Ministry of the Environment has committed $85,000 toward the study of groundwater flow, discharge, and baseflow measurements.

The original town of Fonthill is perched on the moraine, although it has spread beyond the hill. Lookout Point on the north side of the kame commands a view of about one-quarter of the circle of the horizon. Taking advantage of the views, the Lookout Point Country Club, a private golf course, occupies much of the viewing area. For more about the golf club, see Pelham, Ontario.
