= Zac Rinaldo =

Canadian ice hockey player (born 1990)

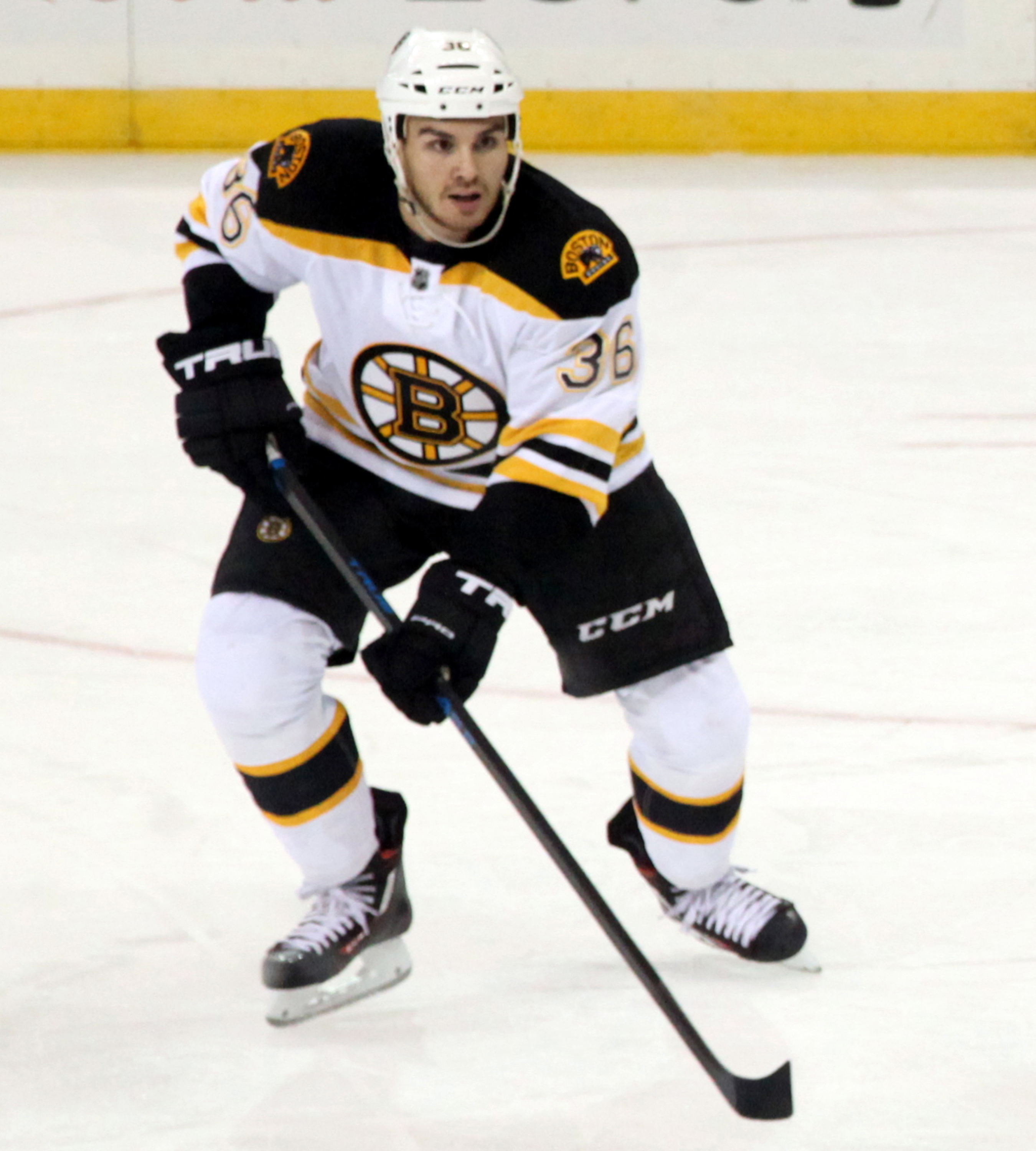
- Rinaldo with the Boston Bruins in 2015
- Born: June 15, 1990 (age 36) Hamilton, Ontario, Canada
- Height: 5 ft 11 in (180 cm)
- Weight: 185 lb (84 kg; 13 st 3 lb)
- Position: Left wing
- Shot: Left
- Played for: Philadelphia Flyers; Boston Bruins; Arizona Coyotes; Nashville Predators; Calgary Flames
- NHL draft: 178th overall, 2008; Philadelphia Flyers
- Playing career: 2010–2021

Zachary Rinaldo (born June 15, 1990) is a Canadian former professional ice hockey left winger. He has previously played in the National Hockey League (NHL) for the Philadelphia Flyers, Boston Bruins, Arizona Coyotes, Nashville Predators and Calgary Flames. He is known for his rough and physical style of play and for being an enforcer. He is currently serving as Head Coach of the Pelham Panthers of the Greater Ontario Junior Hockey League.

== Playing career ==
Rinaldo grew up in Hamilton, Ontario, and played his minor AAA hockey for the Hamilton Reps, Cambridge Hawks, Notre Dame Hounds and Hamilton Jr. Bulldogs of the Ontario Minor Hockey Association (OMHA). He is of Italian ancestry.

After his minor midget season with the Jr. Bulldogs, Rinaldo was drafted by the Mississauga St. Michael's Majors of the Ontario Hockey League (OHL) in the 14th round, 270th overall, in 2006. He spent the following season with the Hamilton Red Wings Jr. A. club in 2006–07 before joining the Majors in 2007–08.

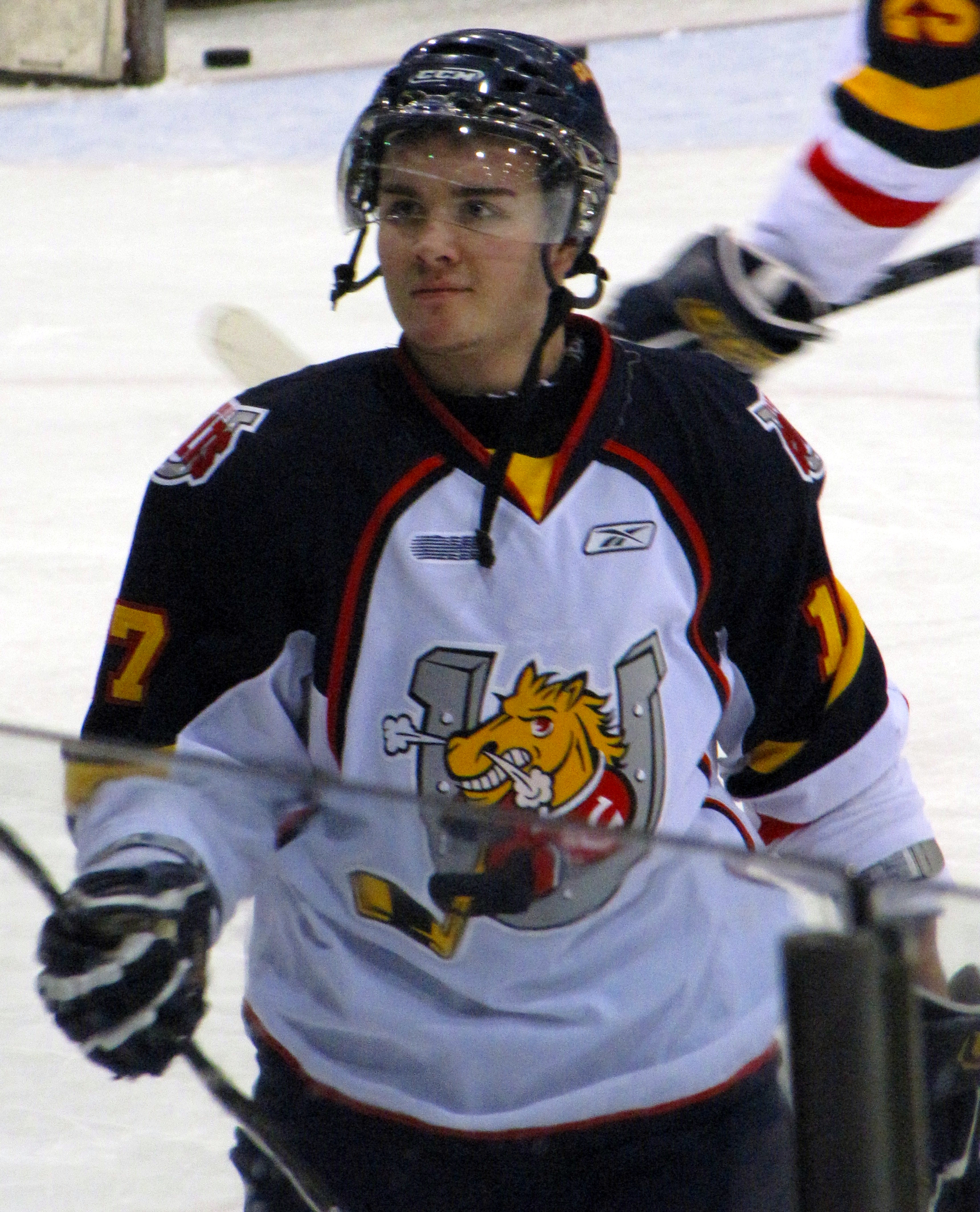
Rinaldo with the Colts.

Rinaldo was selected by the Philadelphia Flyers in the sixth round, 178th overall, of the 2008 NHL entry draft. After spending another season in the OHL, on August 11, 2009, he signed a three-year, entry-level contract with the Flyers. Rinaldo started the 2010–11 AHL season playing with the Flyers' AHL affiliate, the Adirondack Phantoms.

Rinaldo made his NHL debut on April 22, 2011, in Game 5 of the first round of the 2011 Stanley Cup playoffs against the Buffalo Sabres, despite having more suspensions (4) than goals scored (3) for the Flyers' American Hockey League (AHL) affiliate, the Adirondack Phantoms, in the 2010–11 season. He again made the lineup for Game 1 of the Eastern Conference Semifinals against the Boston Bruins, registering two shots.

At the conclusion of the Flyers' training camp in October 2011, Rinaldo made the Flyers' opening night roster for the 2011–12 season, sharing enforcing duties with veteran Jody Shelley.

On April 17, 2013, Rinaldo signed a two-year, $1.5 million contract extension with Philadelphia.

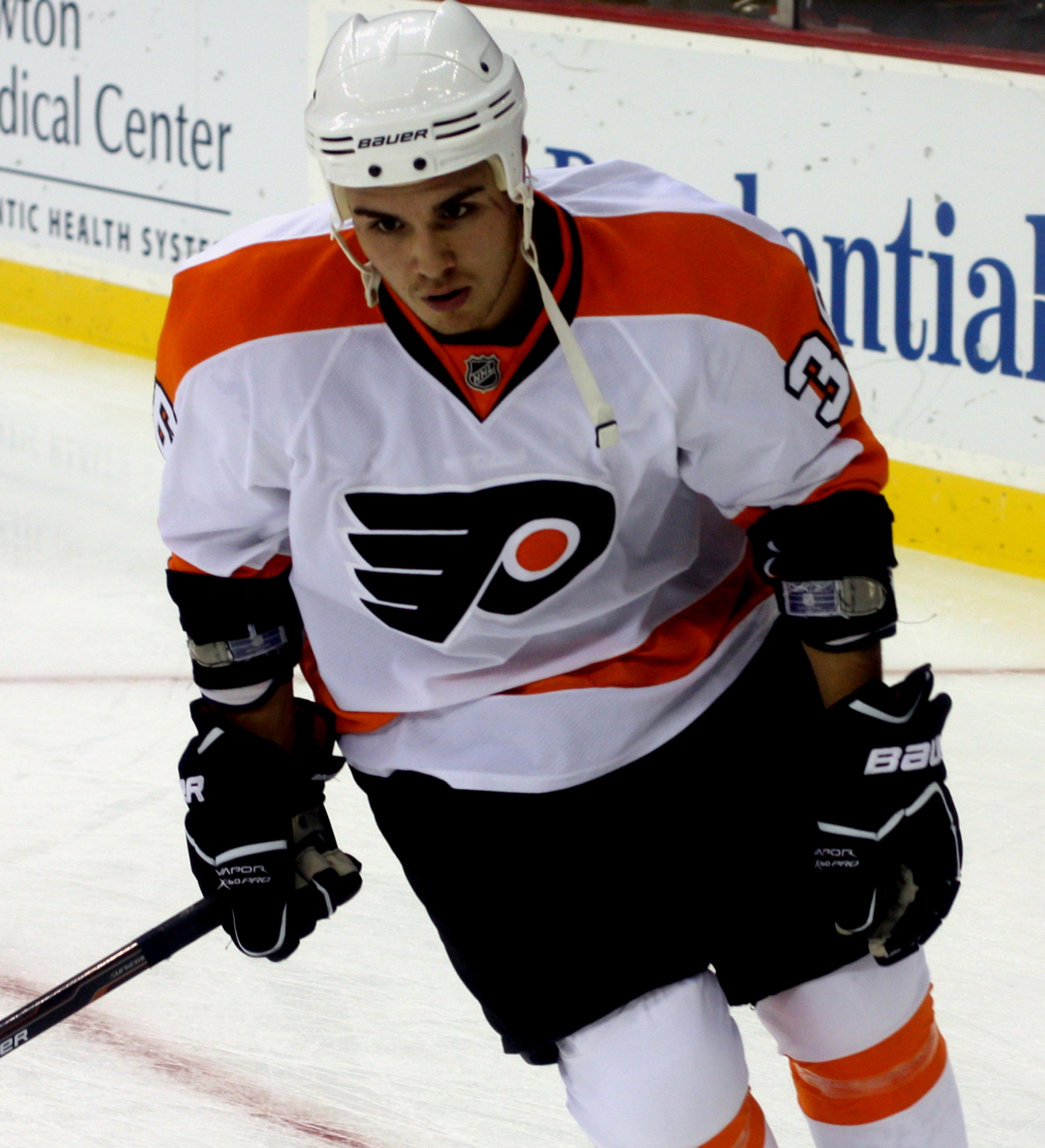
Rinaldo in October 2011.

On January 26, 2015, Rinaldo was suspended eight games for charging Pittsburgh Penguins defenceman Kris Letang; Rinaldo consequently forfeited US$73,170.72 in pay.

Following the 2014–15 season, Rinaldo was traded to the Boston Bruins in exchange for a third-round pick in the 2017 NHL entry draft. On March 1, 2016, Rinaldo was suspended by the NHL for five games for an illegal hit delivered to Tampa Bay Lightning forward Cédric Paquette in a game two days earlier. Rinaldo was promptly placed on waivers by the Bruins, which he cleared. It was his fourth suspension in five NHL seasons, and as a repeat offender, he forfeited $51,829.25 in pay.

On March 4, 2016, after being sent down to the Providence Bruins of the AHL, and while his NHL suspension was still tolled, Rinaldo again faced suspension for an incident in a game against the Bridgeport Sound Tigers, his first game after being demoted. Rinaldo received a match penalty for intent to injure for a hit delivered to Bridgeport defenceman Kane Lafranchise. Rinaldo was suspended from the AHL indefinitely. The AHL later announced that Rinaldo would be suspended for five games for a hit targeting the head.

On July 1, 2017, having left the Bruins organization as a free agent after two seasons (and after spending the entire 2016–17 season in the minors), Rinaldo agreed to a one-year, two-way contract with the Arizona Coyotes. During the 2017–18 season, Rinaldo made his return to the NHL with the Coyotes, playing his first full season since 2015, but not before having to serve the five-game suspension that had been tolled from March 2016. On December 23, 2017, while playing against the Colorado Avalanche, Rinaldo sucker-punched Colorado defenceman Samuel Girard and was suspended for six games.

On July 2, 2018, Rinaldo reunited with former Flyers head coach Peter Laviolette in signing as a free agent to a one-year, two-way contract with the Nashville Predators. Rinaldo made the Predators opening night roster out of training camp, and remained with the team for the majority of the 2018–19 season, posting 1 goal and 3 points in 23 appearances.

As a free agent from the Predators, Rinaldo went un-signed over the summer before accepting an invitation to attend the Calgary Flames training camp. After a successful try-out with the Flames in the pre-season, Rinaldo was signed to a one-year, two-way $700,000 contract with Calgary on September 29, 2019. On October 9, 2020, the opening day of free agency, Rinaldo was re-signed by the Flames to another one-year, two-way $700,000 contract.

On August 13, 2021, Rinaldo signed with the Columbus Blue Jackets on a one-year, two-way $750,000 contract. However, after not receiving the COVID-19 vaccine, Rinaldo was uninvited to the Blue Jackets training camp and told to report to their American Hockey League (AHL) affiliate, the Cleveland Monsters.

== Career statistics ==
			Regular season					Playoffs
Season	Team	League	GP	G	A	Pts	PIM	GP	G	A	Pts	PIM
2005–06	Hamilton Jr. Bulldogs AAA	SCT U16	26	9	15	24	101	—	—	—	—	—
2006–07	Hamilton Red Wings	OPJHL	44	16	16	32	193	16	4	4	8	48
2006–07	Toronto St. Michael's Majors	OHL	6	0	0	0	2	—	—	—	—	—
2007–08	Mississauga St. Michael's Majors	OHL	63	7	7	14	191	4	0	0	0	9
2008–09	Mississauga St. Michael's Majors	OHL	34	6	7	13	112	—	—	—	—	—
2008–09	London Knights	OHL	22	4	13	17	89	8	1	1	2	26
2009–10	London Knights	OHL	34	8	7	15	148	—	—	—	—	—
2009–10	Barrie Colts	OHL	26	2	8	10	107	4	2	0	2	11
2010–11	Adirondack Phantoms	AHL	60	3	6	9	331	—	—	—	—	—
2010–11	Philadelphia Flyers	NHL	—	—	—	—	—	2	0	0	0	12
2011–12	Philadelphia Flyers	NHL	66	2	7	9	232	5	0	0	0	48
2011–12	Adirondack Phantoms	AHL	4	1	1	2	11	—	—	—	—	—
2012–13	Adirondack Phantoms	AHL	31	2	3	5	92	—	—	—	—	—
2012–13	Philadelphia Flyers	NHL	32	3	2	5	85	—	—	—	—	—
2013–14	Philadelphia Flyers	NHL	67	2	2	4	153	7	0	0	0	4
2014–15	Philadelphia Flyers	NHL	58	1	5	6	102	—	—	—	—	—
2015–16	Boston Bruins	NHL	52	1	2	3	83	—	—	—	—	—
2015–16	Providence Bruins	AHL	2	0	0	0	12	—	—	—	—	—
2016–17	Providence Bruins	AHL	29	5	2	7	20	—	—	—	—	—
2017–18	Arizona Coyotes	NHL	53	5	2	7	44	—	—	—	—	—
2018–19	Nashville Predators	NHL	23	1	2	3	20	—	—	—	—	—
2018–19	Milwaukee Admirals	AHL	3	0	1	1	6	—	—	—	—	—
2019–20	Stockton Heat	AHL	14	0	7	7	20	—	—	—	—	—
2019–20	Calgary Flames	NHL	19	3	2	5	34	5	0	0	0	4
2020–21	Calgary Flames	NHL	4	0	0	0	5	—	—	—	—	—
NHL totals			374	18	24	42	758	19	0	0	0	68
