= Port Colborne Sailors =

Port Colborne
- City: Port Colborne, Ontario, Canada
- League: Greater Ontario Hockey League
- Division: Golden Horseshoe
- Founded: 1963
- Owner: Scott Barnes (2017-18)
- General manager: Scott Barnes (2017-18)
- Head coach: Scott Barnes (2017-18)

Franchise history
- 1963-1975: Thorold Jaycees
- 1975-1979: Thorold Paper Bees
- 1979-1982: Thorold Paper C's
- 1982-1986: Thorold Golden Eagles
- 1986-2023: Thorold Blackhawks
- 2023 - present: Port Colborne Sailors

The Port Colborne Sailors (formerly the Thorold Blackhawks) are a Canadian junior ice hockey team based in Port Colborne, Ontario. They play in the Eastern conference of the Greater Ontario Hockey League.

== History ==
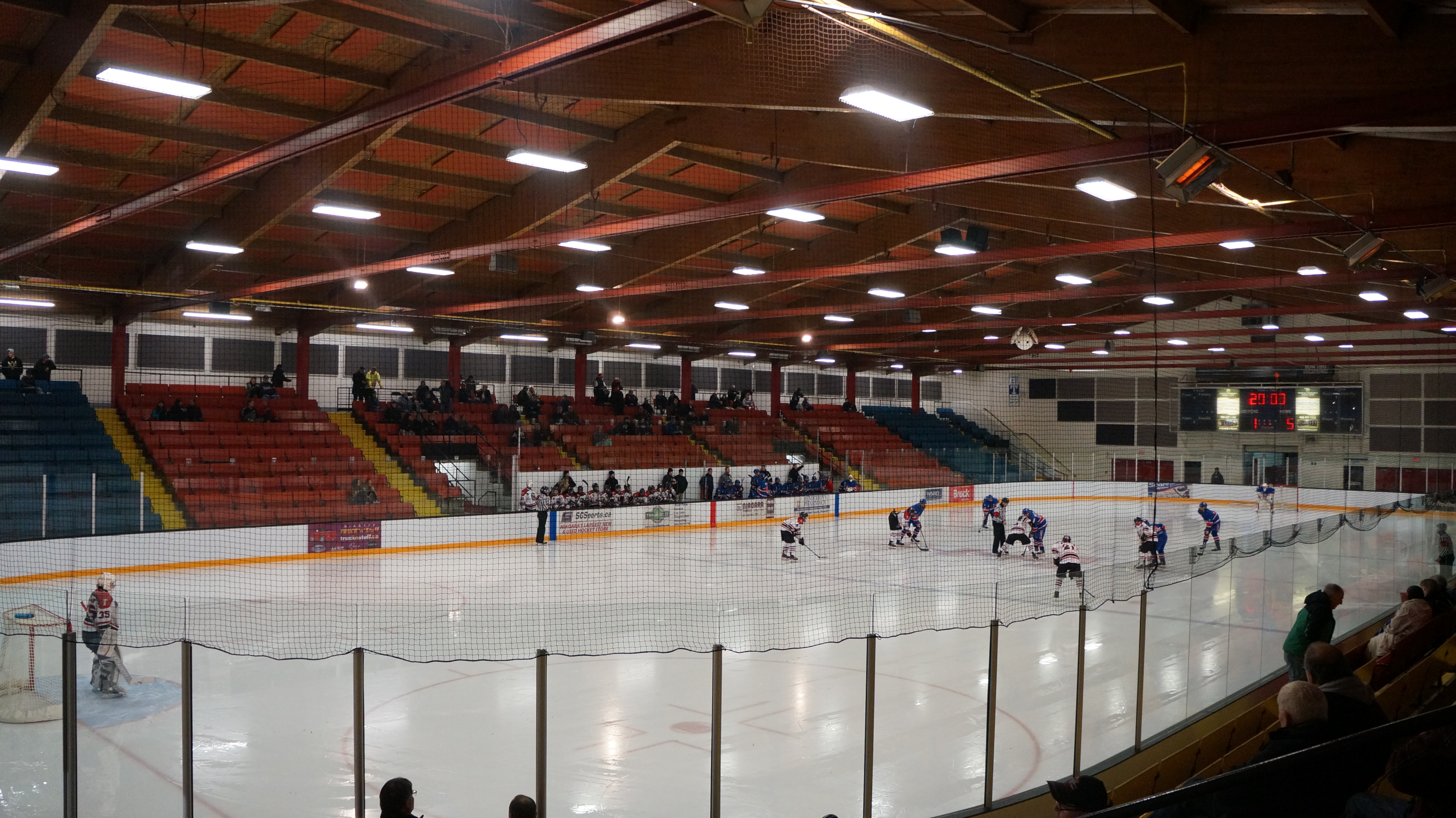
Thorold Blackhawks home game

The Thorold Jaycees joined the Niagara District Junior B Hockey League in 1963, three seasons after the folding of the Thorold Mountaineers. The Jaycees became the Paper Bees in 1975 and stayed with the league until 1979 when it folded. From 1979 until 1982, the team was known as the Thorold Paper C's and played in the local Niagara & District Junior C Hockey League. In 1982, the Paper C's became the Blackhawks and joined Golden Horseshoe Junior B Hockey League. The Blackhawks stayed members of the GHJHL until 2007 when it merged into the GOJHL.

The team consists of mostly local players between the ages of 16 and 21. The Blackhawks were League Champions in 2001, 2003, 2004, and 2005. In 2005, the team went on to capture the Sutherland Cup as the best Jr. B team in Ontario. Many players that started their careers in Thorold went on to play in the Ontario Hockey League, the American Hockey League, and the National Hockey League. Notable alumni include Nathan Horton, Sean Bentivoglio, John Scott, Zenon Konopka, Dwayne Roloson and Owen Nolan.

The Blackhawks played the longest game in club history on March 26, 2006, in a quadruple-overtime thriller of game 6 of their GHL Semi-final series against their arch-rival, the St. Catharines Falcons. The Blackhawks moved onto the GHL finals with this victory. The final score of this contest was 2-1 after Steve Zmudcynski beat St. Catharines' netminder Sean Hall with 5:06 left in the 4th overtime period. Zmudczynski received a long pass from Steve Chappell that set up the winning marker. The game lasted a little over four and a half hours and ended after midnight. An interesting side note from this game is that if there would have been a game seven it would have been played on March 27, the same day Game 6 ended.

=== Logo ===
In October 2013, a Facebook page called Is The Thorold Blackhawks Logo Offensive? was started, which questioned the use of an aboriginal caricature as the team's logo. The page garnered attention from local media and politicians and was brought to the attention of Thorold City Council.

On August 4, 2016, Mayor Ted Luciani announced that the logo would be prohibited from the city's arenas from June 1, 2017. The prohibition would apply to jerseys, signage and marketing materials. Luciani said that the city council had been working with the club since 2013 "to resolve the logo issue amicably" and that the club had been given "more than reasonable opportunity to address the issue." As a result, he said, "The City of Thorold will no longer permit the continued use of a logo that has been deemed offensive."

During a pre-game ceremony at Frank Dougherty Arena on November 3, 2016, the team unveiled their replacement logo, a stylized head of a black bird of prey. Co-owner Tony Gigliotti – who had inherited the controversial logo when he bought the team in 2013 – said: "I understand how the old logo could offend people and that is something we never wanted to be part of. I created [the] new logo with the blackbird theme a few years ago with a graphic design guy in Toronto [James Brandan Walker] and we have tweaked it since then. I actually love the new logo and it is easily identifiable for young children and all our fans so we think it will be part of a good marketing plan in the future."

=== 2016-17 season ===
On February 14, 2017, the Blackhawks announced they were ceasing operations for the remainder of the season due to inability to sustain a full roster. Citing concerns for player safety, the team elected to cease operations with 8 games remaining in the season, which will be recorded as 5-0 forfeit wins for their opponent.

=== Move to Port Colborne and Permanent Relocation ===
Due to ongoing renovations to the Thorold Community Arena, the Blackhawks announced on July 19, 2022, that they would be playing the upcoming 2022–23 season out of the Vale Centre in nearby Port Colborne. On May 5, 2023, the Blackhawks announced they would be making the move permanent and would be officially relocating to Port Colborne for the 2023–24 season, thus ending 60 years of Junior hockey in Thorold.

== Season-by-season results ==
Season	GP	W	L	T	OTL	GF	GA	P	Results	Playoffs
1959-60	24	8	12	4	-	101	124	20	4th NDJBHL	
1963-64	30	5	23	2	-	120	263	12	6th NDJBHL	DNQ
1964-65	30	10	18	2	-	133	201	22	6th NDJBHL	Lost semi-final
1965-66	30	11	16	3	-	162	220	25	6th NDJBHL	Lost quarter-final
1966-67	-	-	-	-	-	-	-	-	3rd NDJBHL	
1967-68	30	12	13	5	-	148	161	29	4th NDJBHL	
1968-69	36	7	22	7	-	167	238	21	6th NDJBHL	
1969-70	36	13	20	3	-	163	208	29	5th NDJBHL	
1970-71	36	13	17	6	-	177	221	32	5th NDJBHL	
1971-72	35	14	17	4	-	185	195	32	6th NDJBHL	
1972-73	35	11	24	0	-	129	212	22	7th NDJBHL	
1973-74	35	3	29	3	-	107	228	9	8th NDJBHL	
1974-75	35	8	22	5	-	121	181	21	5th NDJBHL	
1975-76	40	23	10	7	-	158	126	53	3rd NDJBHL	
1976-77	39	14	24	1	-	162	217	31	4th NDJBHL	
1977-78	40	11	24	5	-	170	240	27	4th NDJBHL	Lost semi-final
1978-79	40								5th NDJBHL	DNQ
1979-80	35	17	15	5	-	224	199	37	3rd NJC-E	
1980-81	40	26	14	0	-	247	213	52	2nd NJC-E	Lost quarter-final
1981-82	Niagara-Can-Am Jr. C Statistics Not Available									
1982-83	42	13	26	3	-	241	293	29	7th GHJHL	
1983-84	42	9	28	5	-	178	252	23	8th GHJHL	
1984-85	42	2	39	1	-	150	381	5	8th GHJHL	
1985-86	40	19	18	3	-	184	215	41	6th GHJHL	
1986-87	42	15	18	9	-	202	233	39	5th GHJHL	
1987-88	42	17	21	4	-	209	270	38	5th GHJHL	
1988-89	42	25	10	7	-	197	148	57	2nd GHJHL	Lost final
1989-90	48	31	14	1	2	246	200	65	2nd GHJHL	Lost final
1990-91	42	26	14	2	0	236	182	54	4th GHJHL	
1991-92	42	15	26	1	0	189	219	31	6th GHJHL	
1992-93	42	22	16	1	3	239	219	48	4th GHJHL	
1993-94	40	25	12	1	2	270	178	53	2nd GHJHL	Lost final
1994-95	42	19	21	2	1	188	220	41	4th GHJHL	
1995-96	42	10	26	3	3	190	235	26	7th GHJHL	
1996-97	42	14	22	5	1	181	181	34	6th GHJHL	
1997-98	49	26	16	4	3	255	213	59	4th GHJHL	
1998-99	47	17	24	5	1	167	180	40	5th GHJHL	
1999-00	48	32	13	1	2	237	155	67	1st GHJHL	Lost final
2000-01	48	31	10	7	0	220	126	69	2nd GHJHL	Won League
2001-02	48	31	12	3	2	216	138	67	3rd GHJHL	Lost final
2002-03	48	41	4	3	0	282	100	85	1st GHJHL	Won League
2003-04	48	34	7	7	0	179	84	75	2nd GHJHL	Won League
2004-05	48	37	6	5	0	185	85	79	1st GHJHL	Won League, won Sutherland Cup
2005-06	49	29	18	2	0	192	125	60	3rd GHJHL	Lost final
2006-07	49	30	16	2	1	226	169	63	4th GHJHL	Lost semi-final
2007-08	49	30	12	6	1	227	144	67	1st GOJHL-GH	Lost RR Semi-final
2008-09	52	31	18	-	3	217	197	65	3rd GOJHL-GH	
2009-10	51	35	12	-	4	211	164	74	3rd GOJHL-GH	Lost Conf. SF
2010-11	51	38	11	-	2	251	135	78	2nd GOJHL-GH	Lost Conf. Final
2011-12	51	32	17	-	2	197	126	66	3rd GOJHL-GH	
2012-13	51	28	19	-	4	192	174	60	5th GOJHL-GH	Lost Conf. SF
2013-14	49	28	17	-	4	210	185	60	4th GOJHL-GH	Lost Conf. SF
2014-15	49	14	31	-	4	117	203	32	7th GOJHL-GH	Lost Conf. Quarter-finals, 1-4 (Falcons)
2015-16	50	21	25	1	3	152	172	46	6th of 8-GH; 17th of 26-GOJHL	Lost Conf. Quarter-finals, 0-4 (Avalanche)
2016-17	50	11	36	1	2	133	206	25	8th of 9-GH; 25th of 27-GOJHL	no playoffs folded with 8 games remaining in season
2017-18	50	20	22	3	5	160	205	48	5th of 9-GH; 16th of 26-GOJHL	Lost Conf. Quarterfinals 0-4 (Canucks)
2018-19	48	20	23	3	2	149	167	48	5th of 8-GH; 15th of 25-GOJHL	Lost Conf. Quarterfinals 0-4 (Panthers)
2019-20	50	26	20	4	0	181	162	56	5th of 9-GH; 15th of 25-GOJHL	Lost Conf. Quarterfinals 0-4 (Kilty B's±)
2020–21	Season lost due to COVID-19									
2021-22	48	15	32	0	1	89	155	31	6th of 8-GH; 20th of 25-GOJHL	Lost Conf. Quarterfinals 0-4 (Corvairs)
2022-23	50	24	24	2	0	168	155	50	5th of 8-GH; 17th of 25-GOJHL	Lost Conf. Quarterfinals 1-4 (Corvairs)
PORT COLBORNE SAILORS
2023-24	50	12	33	4	1	128	216	29	7th of 7-GH; 20th of 23-GOJHL	Lost Conf. Quarterfinals 0-4 (Meteors)
2024-25	50	31	16	2	1	188	139	65	4th of 11 East Conf; 8th of 23-GOJHL	Lost Conf. Quarterfinals 2-4 (Corvairs)
2025-26	50	27	18	4	1	175	145	59	5th of 11 East Conf; 10th of 23-GOJHL	Lost Conf. Quarterfinals 0-4 (Panthers)

== Sutherland Cup appearances ==
2001: Elmira Sugar Kings defeated Thorold Blackhawks 4-games-to-2
2003: Stratford Cullitons defeated Thorold Blackhawks 4-games-to-3
2004: Stratford Cullitons defeated Thorold Blackhawks 4-games-to-none
2005: Thorold Blackhawks defeated Chatham Maroons 4-games-to-1

== Professional alumni ==
- Vince Dunn
- John Scott
- Conor Timmins
- Sean Bentivoglio
- Dwayne Roloson
- Nathan Horton
- Joey Martin (ice hockey)
