= Pelham Panthers =

- City: Pelham, Ontario, Canada
- League: Greater Ontario Hockey League
- Division: Golden Horseshoe
- Founded: c. 1940
- Home arena: Meridian Community Centre
- Colours: Green, black, and white
- Owner: Wes Gee
- General manager: Emelie Ficht
- Head coach: Zac Rinaldo

Franchise history
- 1970–1972: Port Colborne Sailors
- 1972–1976: Port Colborne Swords
- 1976–1983: Port Colborne Sailors
- 1983–1985: Team Port Colborne
- 1985–1991: Port Colborne Schooners
- 1991–1995: Port Colborne Kinsmen
- 1995–2008: Port Colborne Sailors
- 2008–2014: Port Colborne Pirates
- 2014: Pelham Pirates
- 2014–present: Pelham Panthers

The Pelham Panthers, formerly the Port Colborne Pirates, are a junior ice hockey team based in Pelham, Ontario, Canada. They play in the Eastern conference of the Greater Ontario Hockey League.

== History ==
The Port Colborne Recreationists were a junior ice hockey team in the Ontario Hockey Association that played at the Junior B level through most of the 1940s. The Recreationists captured the 1943 Junior B championship, Sutherland Cup and were promoted to the Junior A level the following year where they competed for one full season. The Junior A team folded early in their second season and the Recreationists returned to Junior B hockey the following year.

The "Sailors" moniker dates back to the 1940s as well. The Port Colborne Sailors were one of the most successful franchises in the OHA Major Intermediate A Hockey League winning championships in 1949, 1950, 1961, 1962, 1965, 1969, 1970, 1975 and 1976.

Since 1970 the Sailors have spent most of their time in the Niagara Junior C Hockey League with the exception of 1975 through 1979 when the team participated in the Niagara District Junior B Hockey League. The team changed its name several times (Sailors, Swords, Kinsmen, Schooners) before returning to the familiar "Sailors" moniker that the team played as between 1995 and 2008. In 2009 the team rebranded itself one more time as the Port Colborne Pirates.

Sutherland Cups: 1943 (as the Port Colborne Recreationists)

In 2014, after decades in Port Colborne, the team relocated to Pelham. In November 2014, the team changed their nickname to the Panthers.

== Season-by-season results ==
Season	GP	W	L	T	OTL	GF	GA	P	Results	Playoffs
1970-71	36	10	19	7	-	146	191	27	6th NDJBHL	
1971-72	35	15	14	6	-	184	186	36	4th NDJBHL	
1972-73	35	10	23	2	-	151	205	22	8th NDJBHL	
1973-74	35	7	26	2	-	151	249	16	7th NDJBHL	
1974-75	35	14	18	3	-	195	237	31	4th NDJBHL	
1975-76	40	12	24	4	-	154	201	28	5th NDJBHL	
1976-77	39	22	12	5	-	254	193	49	3rdh NDJBHL	
1977-78	40	9	26	5	-	183	289	23	5th NDJBHL	DNQ
1978-79	40	14	24	2	-	--	--	30	4th NDJBHL	Lost semi-final
1979-80	35	16	17	2	-	196	185	34	4th NJC-E	
1980-81	40	23	11	6	-	252	171	52	3rd NJC-E	Lost quarter-final
1981-82	36	29	6	1	-	--	--	59	1st NJC-CA	Lost final
1982-83	31	13	13	5	-	--	--	31	4th NJC-E	Lost quarter-final
1983-84	40	30	7	3	-	--	--	63	1st NJC-E	
1984-85	34	20	9	5	-	161	119	45	2nd NJCHL	
1985-86	40	12	21	7	-	189	214	31	9th GHJHL	
1986-87	42	23	16	3	-	258	203	49	4th GHJHL	Lost final
1987-88	42	32	6	4	-	326	179	68	2nd GHJHL	Lost final
1988-89	42	21	12	9	-	229	176	51	4th GHJHL	
1989-90	48	17	26	2	3	254	299	39	7th GHJHL	
1990-91	42	10	30	1	1	184	285	22	7th GHJHL	
1991-92	42	14	27	0	1	172	253	29	7th GHJHL	
1992-93	42	8	32	2	0	149	293	18	7th GHJHL	
1993-94	40	13	25	2	0	192	260	28	5th GHJHL	
1994-95	42	17	22	3	1	171	194	38	5th GHJHL	
1995-96	50	35	14	0	1	222	177	71	2nd GHJHL	
1996-97	42	32	7	3	0	254	134	67	1st GHJHL	Lost final
1997-98	49	22	23	2	2	211	223	48	5th GHJHL	
1998-99	48	23	16	7	2	184	138	55	3rd GHJHL	
1999-00	48	25	19	3	1	174	143	54	5th GHJHL	
2000-01	48	22	18	5	3	185	149	52	4th GHJHL	Lost final
2001-02	48	33	12	2	1	250	157	69	2nd GHJHL	
2002-03	48	20	22	2	4	241	256	46	4th GHJHL	
2003-04	48	9	32	6	1	123	215	25	7th GHJHL	
2004-05	48	20	20	6	2	155	178	48	4th GHJHL	
2005-06	49	16	30	2	1	160	235	35	6th GHJHL	Lost quarter-final
2006-07	49	30	16	1	2	238	210	63	3rd GHJHL	Lost semi-final
2007-08	49	14	32	1	2	152	197	31	7th GOJHL-GH	
2008-09	52	16	27	-	9	170	250	41	8th GOJHL-GH	Lost quarter-final
2009-10	51	17	30	-	4	173	243	38	6th GOJHL-GH	Lost Conf. QF
2010-11	51	25	18	-	8	225	195	58	5th GOJHL-GH	Lost Conf. SF
2011-12	51	32	17	-	2	212	191	66	4th GOJHL-GH	Lost Conf. Final
2012-13	51	35	12	-	4	250	158	74	2nd GOJHL-GH	Lost Conf. SF
2013-14	49	9	37	-	3	154	298	21	8th GOJHL-GH	Lost Conf. QF
2014-15	49	5	42	-	2	120	336	12	8th GOJHL-GH	
2016-17	50	12	34	0	4	129	244	28	7th of 9-GH; 23rd of 27-GOJHL	Lost Conf. Quarter-finals, 0–4 (Corvairs)
2015-16	50	1	45	0	4	105	381	6	8th of 8-GH; 26th of 26-GOJHL	Lost Conf. Quarter-finals, 0–4 (Corvairs)
2016-17	50	12	34	0	4	129	244	28	7th of 9-GH; 23rd of 27-GOJHL	Lost Conf. Quarter-finals, 0–4 (Falcons)
2017-18	50	17	29	1	3	139	217	38	7th of 9-GH; 18th of 26-GOJHL	Lost Conf. Quarter-finals, 0–4 (Falcons)
2018-19	47	25	17	0	5	148	128	55	4th of 8-GH; 12th of 25-GOJHL	Won Conf. Quarter-finals, 4-2 (Blackhawks); Lost Conf. Semi 0-4 (Canucks)
2019-20	50	17	30	0	3	111	199	37	6th of 9-GH; 20th of 26-GOJHL	Lost Conf. Quarter-finals, 0–4 (Falcons)
2020–21	Season lost due to Covid-19									
2021-22	48	14	32	2	0	110	192	30	7th of 8-GH; 22nd of 25-GOJHL	Lost Conf. Quarter-finals, 0–4 (Falcons)
2022-23	50	4	42	3	1	84	240	12	8th of 8-GH; 24th of 25-GOJHL	Lost Conf. Quarter-finals, 0–4 (Falcons)
2023-24	50	14	33	2	1	124	209	31	6th of 7-GH; 19th of 23-GOJHL	Lost Conf. Quarter-finals, 1-4 (Falcons)
2024-25	50	20	25	5	0	154	190	45	9th of 11-East; 18th of 23-GOJHL	Did Not Qualify
2025-26	50	32	17	0	1	191	128	65	4th of 11-East; 9th of 23-GOJHL	Won Conf. Quarter-finals, 4- (Port Colborne); Lost Conf. Semifinals, 0-4(Cambridge)

== Notable alumni ==
- Florian Xhekaj

== See also ==
- Port Colborne Recreationists
