= Pelham, Ontario =

Pelham
- Town (lower-tier)
- Town of Pelham
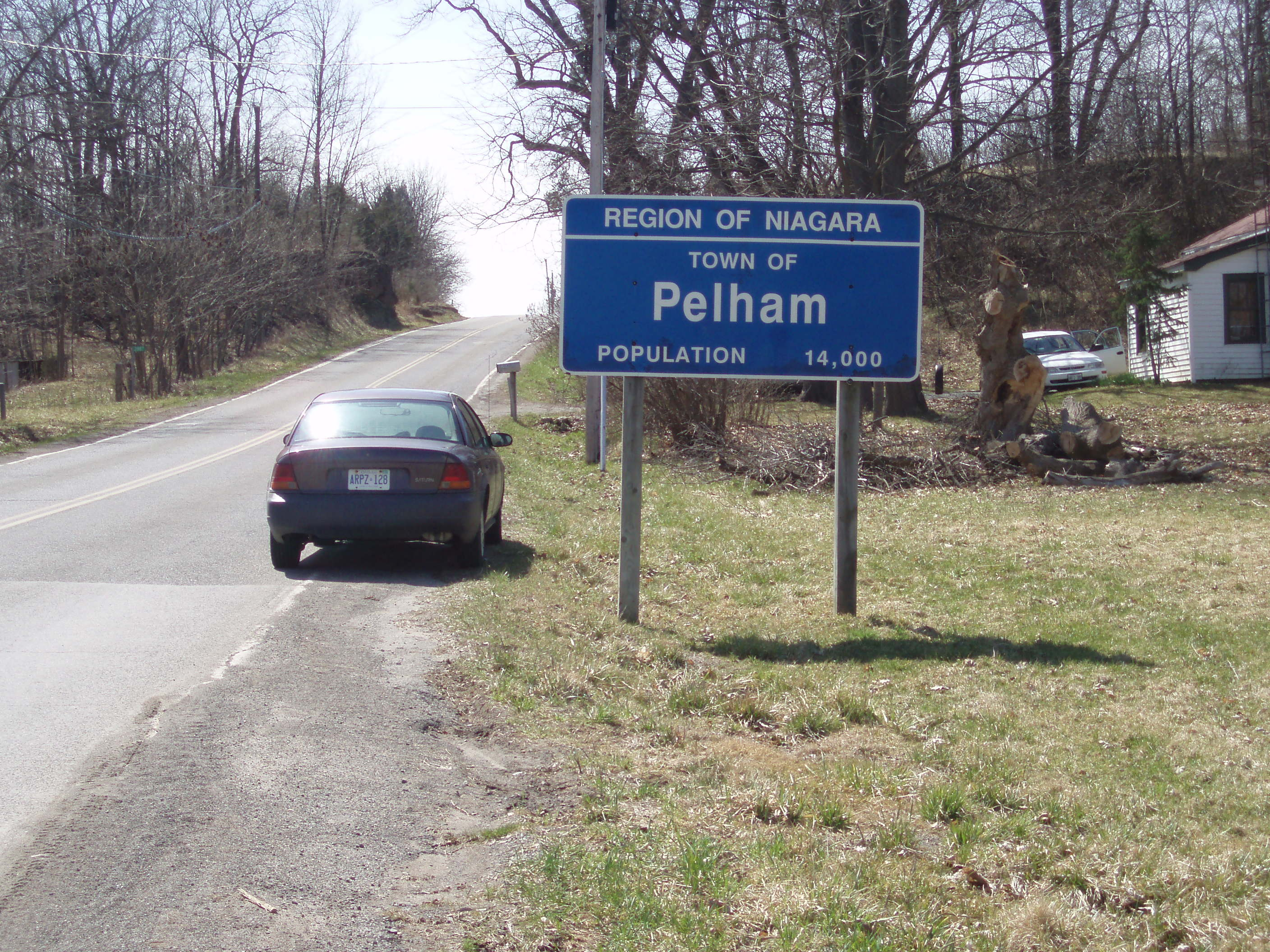

- Location within Regional Municipality of Niagara Location within Southern Ontario
- Coordinates: 43°02′N 79°20′W
- Country: Canada
- Province: Ontario
- Region: Niagara
- Formed: 1970

Government
  - Mayor: Marvin Junkin
  - Federal riding: Niagara West
  - Prov. riding: Niagara West

Area
  - Land: 126.43 km^{2} (48.81 sq mi)

Population (2016)
  - Total: 17,110
  - Density: 135.3/km^{2} (350/sq mi)
- Time zone: UTC-5 (EST)
  - Summer (DST): UTC-4 (EDT)
- Postal Code: L0S
- Area codes: 905, 289, 365
- Website: www.pelham.ca

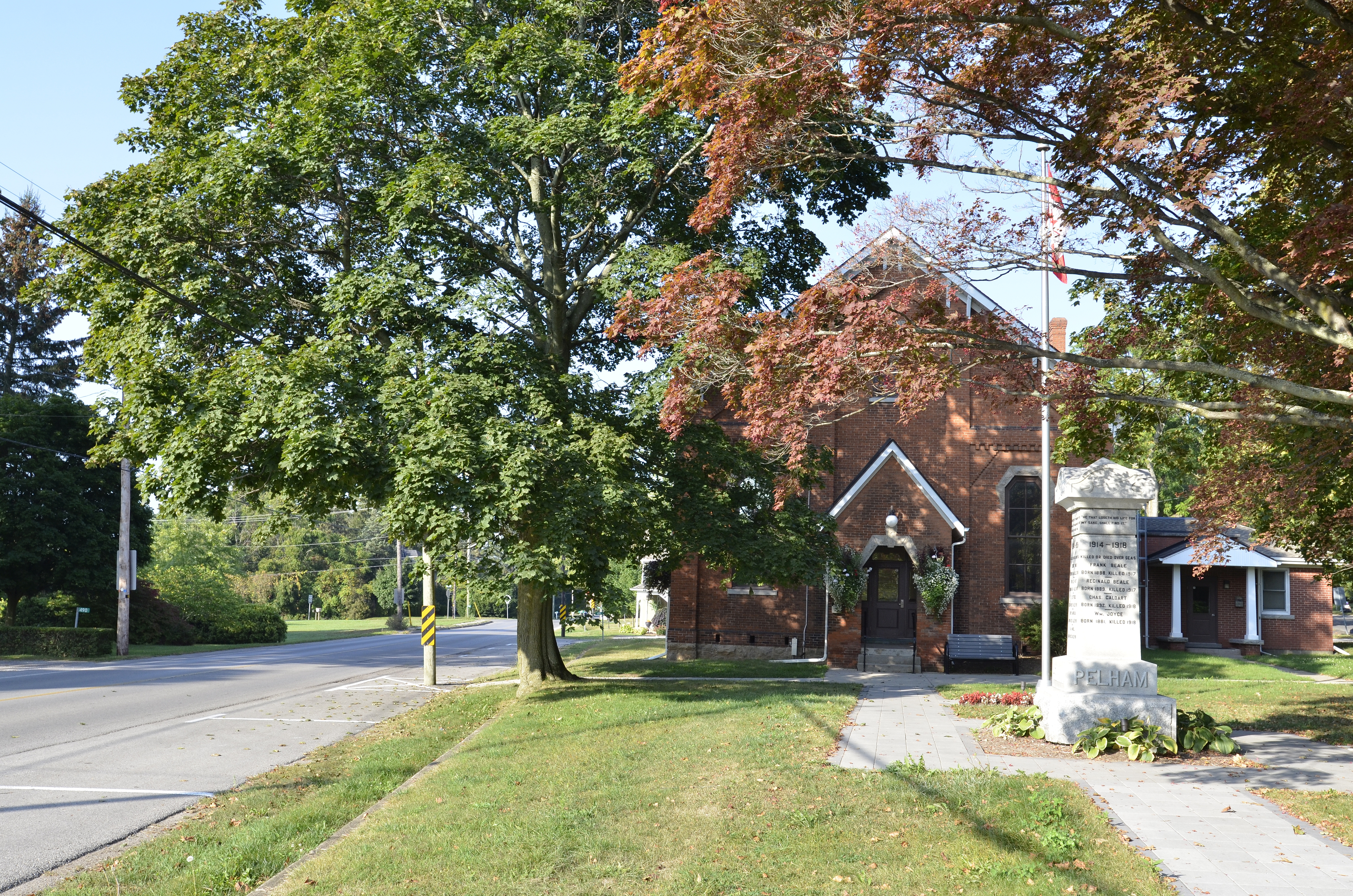
Town Hall in Pelham Centre

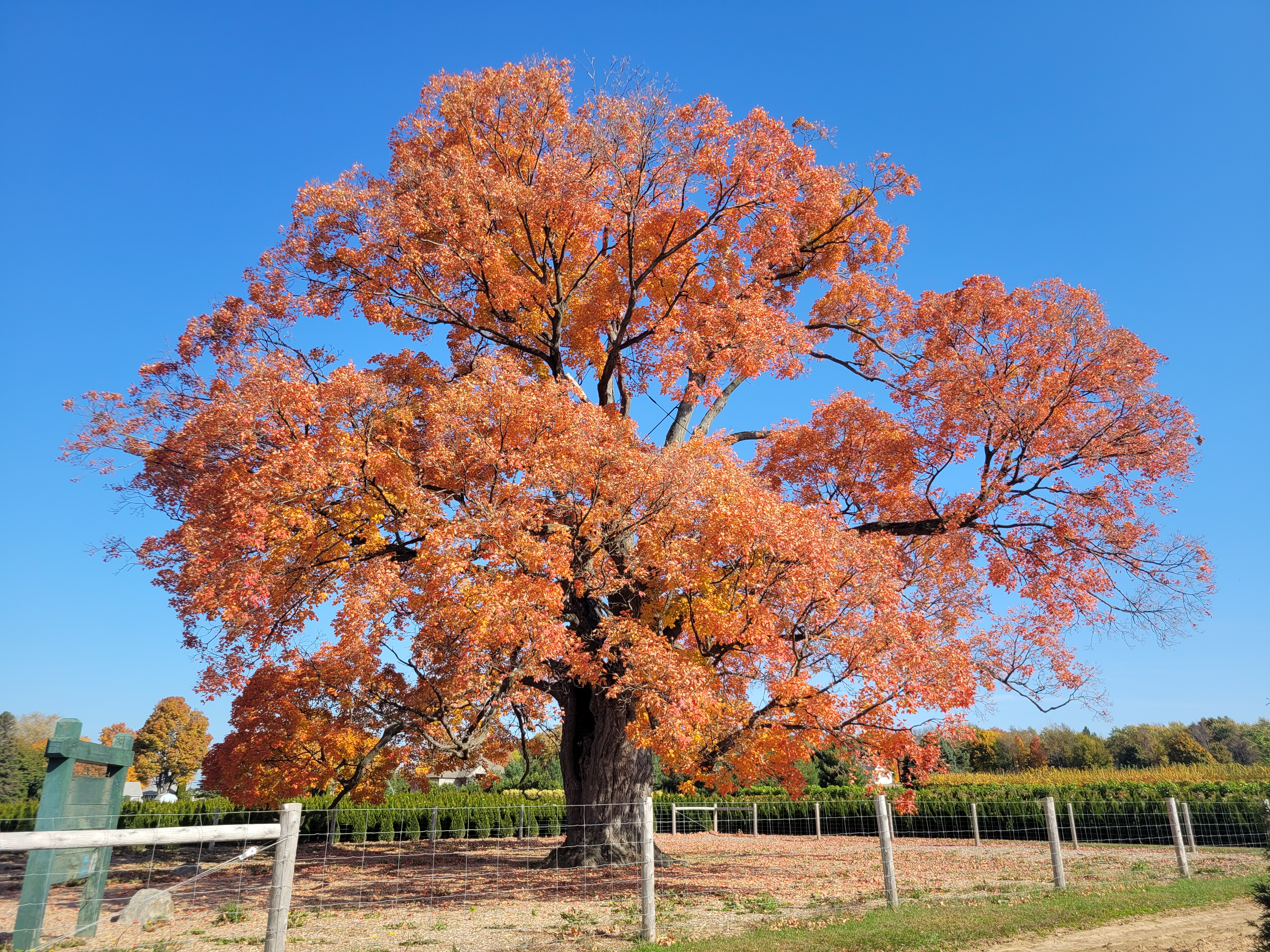
Comfort Maple in Comfort Maple Conservation Area

Pelham (2016 population 17,110) is a town located in the centre of Niagara Region in Ontario, Canada.

The town's southern boundary is formed by the Welland River, a meandering waterway that flows into the Niagara River. To the west is the township of West Lincoln, to the east the city of Welland and the city of Thorold, and to the north the city of St. Catharines and the town of Lincoln. North Pelham contains the picturesque Short Hills (see attractions). Two important creeks have their headwaters within Pelham; Coyle Creek, which flows south into the Welland River, and Twelve Mile creek, a spring-fed stream that flows north into Lake Ontario.

== History ==
Pelham Township was part of the original Welland County since the late 1780s. The Town of Pelham derives its name from Pelham Township, which John Graves Simcoe named in the 1790s. In the beginning, the townships were only numbered and not named. The policy of Simcoe was to adopt township names from England. Pelham was named after the Pelham family though it is uncertain which particular Pelham family member it is attributed to - either Henry Fiennes Pelham-Clinton (nephew to 2 Prime Ministers and considered powerful and influential) or Charles Anderson-Pelham (a quiet MP from Lincolnshire who spoke only once in 26 years in the House of Commons). Another theory which has been proposed is that it was named after early Township of Humberstone landowner Joshua Pell's family manor in Westchester County, New York—Pelham Manor—lost by the Loyalist Pells during the American Revolution (Pell went first in exile to Nova Scotia in 1783, before later being granted lands in the Niagara area after a direct appeal to George III.) This theory is improbale as the Pell family first applied for their Niagara land a year after the Township of Pelham was already named.

In 1922, the Village of Fonthill became a separate incorporated municipality by petitioning for land from the Township of Pelham and the Township of Thorold.

The current Town of Pelham was created in 1970 as part of area municipal restructuring through the amalgamation of the Township of Pelham, Village of Fonthill and a small portion of the Township of Thorold immediately adjacent to Fonthill.

== Notable people from Pelham ==
- Dorothy Wetherald Rungeling, C.M. spent 106 years in this town.
- Steve Bauer grew up in Fenwick winning a silver medal at the 1984 Olympics in cycling and later became a professional cyclist.
- World Golf Hall of Fame inductee Marlene Streit also grew up in Pelham, belonged to the Lookout Point Golf and Country Club, and has a park in the Town's core named after her.
- CTV's morning show Canada AM's weather and sportsman, Jeff Hutcheson currently lives in Fenwick.
- Former NHL enforcer Matt Johnson was raised and lived in Fenwick, although his birthplace is listed as Welland as this is where the local hospital is located.
- Natalie Mastracci, Silver Medalist for rowing at the 2012 Olympic Games went to St. Alexander School in Fonthill, Ontario
- Lacrosse player Mike Accursi is from Pelham.

== Government ==
The Town is divided into three wards, each of which elects two councillors to sit on Town Council for a period of four years. The Mayor is elected separately, serves on the Council of the Niagara Region, and (since 2006) also serves four years.

=== Mayors of the Town of Pelham ===
- 1970-1976: Harold Black
- 1976-1978: John Weldon
- 1978-1988: Eric Bergenstein
- 1988-1994: Mardi Collins
- 1994-2003: Ralph Beamer
- 2003-2006: Ron Leavens
- 2006-2018: Dave Augustyn
- 2018–present: Marvin Junkin

=== Regional Councillors of the Town of Pelham ===
Regional councillors represent Pelham on Regional Municipality of Niagara Council.

- 2003-2018: Brian Baty
- 2018-2022: Diana Huson

== Demographics ==
Historical population
Year	Pop.	±%
1971	9,997	—
1981	11,104	+11.1%
1991	13,328	+20.0%
2001	15,272	+14.6%
2006	16,155	+5.8%
2011	16,598	+2.7%
2016	17,110	+3.1%

In the 2021 Census of Population conducted by Statistics Canada, Pelham had a population of 18,192 living in 6,959 of its 7,123 total private dwellings, a change of 6.3% from its 2016 population of 17,110. With a land area of 126.35 km^{2} (48.78 sq mi), it had a population density of 144.0/km^{2} (372.9/sq mi) in 2021.

== Sports and recreation ==
Pelham's sports include:

Merdian Community Centre - Pelham, ON

- Pelham Panthers

== Climate ==
The city has a warm-summer humid continental climate (Köppen: Dfb), due to the absence of a UHI to heat as in cities of latitudes equal or more to the north as Hamilton or Niagara Falls (in Dfa zone), but approaching this climatic category.

Climate data for Ridgeville, elevation: 236.2 m or 775 ft, 1981-2010 normals, extremes 1950-2006
Month	Jan	Feb	Mar	Apr	May	Jun	Jul	Aug	Sep	Oct	Nov	Dec	Year
Record high °C (°F)	17.0 (62.6)	19.5 (67.1)	26.0 (78.8)	32.0 (89.6)	33.0 (91.4)	33.0 (91.4)	35.5 (95.9)	35.0 (95.0)	33.9 (93.0)	29.4 (84.9)	25.0 (77.0)	20.0 (68.0)	35.5 (95.9)
Mean daily maximum °C (°F)	−1.3 (29.7)	0.0 (32.0)	4.5 (40.1)	11.8 (53.2)	18.5 (65.3)	23.4 (74.1)	26.0 (78.8)	25.0 (77.0)	20.9 (69.6)	14.1 (57.4)	7.8 (46.0)	1.7 (35.1)	12.7 (54.9)
Daily mean °C (°F)	−4.4 (24.1)	−3.3 (26.1)	0.7 (33.3)	7.3 (45.1)	13.6 (56.5)	18.9 (66.0)	21.7 (71.1)	20.9 (69.6)	16.9 (62.4)	10.5 (50.9)	4.7 (40.5)	−1.2 (29.8)	8.9 (47.9)
Mean daily minimum °C (°F)	−7.5 (18.5)	−6.7 (19.9)	−3.1 (26.4)	2.7 (36.9)	8.6 (47.5)	14.3 (57.7)	17.4 (63.3)	16.7 (62.1)	12.9 (55.2)	6.9 (44.4)	1.6 (34.9)	−4.0 (24.8)	5.0 (41.0)
Record low °C (°F)	−25.5 (−13.9)	−24.4 (−11.9)	−21.0 (−5.8)	−11.7 (10.9)	−3.5 (25.7)	2.8 (37.0)	5.0 (41.0)	5.0 (41.0)	1.1 (34.0)	−3.9 (25.0)	−12.2 (10.0)	−26.0 (−14.8)	−26.0 (−14.8)
Average precipitation mm (inches)	67.1 (2.64)	53.6 (2.11)	64.2 (2.53)	77.7 (3.06)	89.2 (3.51)	84.7 (3.33)	83.6 (3.29)	77.6 (3.06)	92.6 (3.65)	86.3 (3.40)	90.7 (3.57)	78.9 (3.11)	946.2 (37.26)
Average rainfall mm (inches)	32.7 (1.29)	30.9 (1.22)	45.2 (1.78)	72.3 (2.85)	88.7 (3.49)	84.7 (3.33)	83.6 (3.29)	77.6 (3.06)	92.6 (3.65)	86.1 (3.39)	80.7 (3.18)	53.6 (2.11)	828.7 (32.64)
Average snowfall cm (inches)	34.3 (13.5)	24.0 (9.4)	19.0 (7.5)	5.4 (2.1)	0.5 (0.2)	0.0 (0.0)	0.0 (0.0)	0.0 (0.0)	0.0 (0.0)	0.2 (0.1)	6.6 (2.6)	25.3 (10.0)	115.3 (45.4)
Average precipitation days (≥ 0.2 mm)	11.6	8.4	10.1	11.6	12.0	10.5	9.9	9.4	9.9	11.4	11.7	11.7	128.2
Average rainy days (≥ 0.2 mm)	5.2	4.1	7.4	10.9	12.0	10.5	9.9	9.4	9.9	11.4	10.4	7.4	108.5
Average snowy days (≥ 0.2 cm)	6.8	4.8	3.4	1.2	0.08	0.0	0.0	0.0	0.0	0.04	1.6	5.4	23.32
Source: Environment Canada

== Communities ==
- Effingham
- Fenwick
- Fonthill
- North Pelham
- Pelham Centre
- Pelham Corners
- Ridgeville

== See also ==
- List of townships in Ontario
- Sun Valley Gardens
