= Fenwick, Ontario =

Fenwick
- Unincorporated community
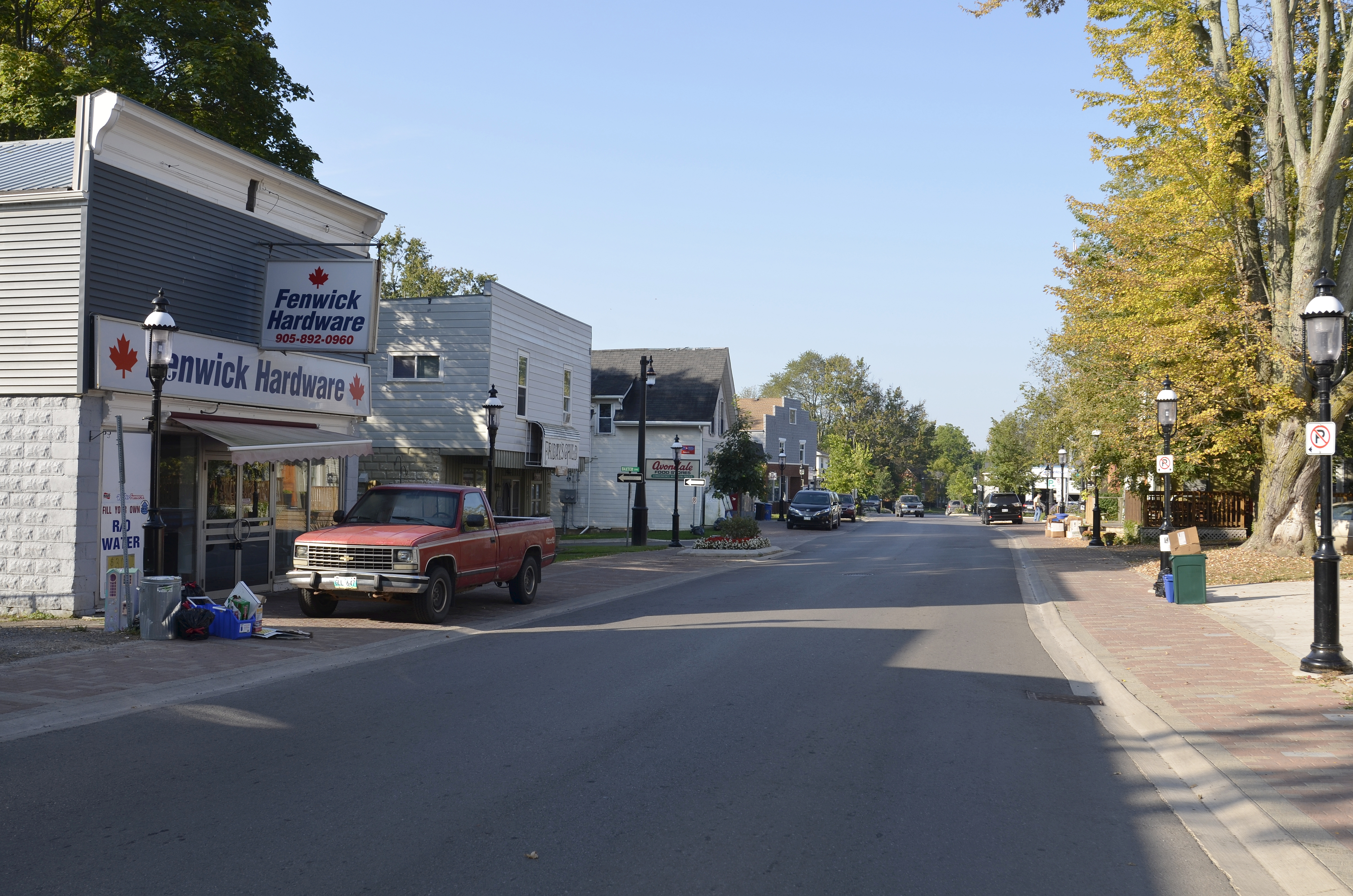
- Canboro Road in Fenwick
- Interactive map of Fenwick
- Coordinates: 43°1′29″N 79°21′40″W
- Country: Canada
- Province: Ontario
- Regional municipality: Niagara
- Town: Pelham
- Time zone: UTC-5 (EST)
  - Summer (DST): UTC-4 (EDT)
- Forward sortation area: L0S 1C0
- Area codes: 905 and 289
- NTS Map: 030M03
- GNBC Code: FBDWH

Fenwick is a community in the Canadian province of Ontario, in the town of Pelham. It is located in the Niagara Region. Welland is the closest city centre. Fenwick has a population of 1,500.

== History ==
The community was named in 1853. The name probably comes from Fenwick, East Ayrshire in Scotland, which was the birthplace of Dr. John Fraser, who was reeve of Pelham Township at the time.

The post office dates from 1862.

== See also ==
- List of communities in Ontario
