= Fonthill, Ontario =

Fonthill
- Unincorporated community
- Peace Park
- Interactive map of Fonthill
- Coordinates: 43°2′38″N 79°17′15″W
- Country: Canada
- Province: Ontario
- Regional municipality: Niagara
- Town: Pelham
- Time zone: UTC−5 (EST)
  - Summer (DST): UTC−4 (EDT)
- Forward sortation area: L0S 1E0 & L3E
- Area codes: 905 and 289
- NTS Map: 30M3 Niagara
- GNBC Code: FBERB
- Website: http://www.pelham.ca

Fonthill is a community in the town of Pelham, Ontario, Canada. It has a few small industries, but is primarily a residential suburb with some fruit orchards and nature trails. As a bedroom community, most residents commute to Welland, St. Catharines and some as far as Buffalo, Hamilton and Toronto daily for work.

== Geography and geology ==
Fonthill shares its name with the Fonthill Kame, on which it is located, formed by glacial deposits. Effingham Creek, a cold-water stream, originates in the glacial silts and sands of Short Hills area of the moraine, northwest of Fonthill. Effingham Creek is a tributary to Twelve-Mile Creek, which empties into Lake Ontario.

For more about the geology of the town, see Fonthill Kame.

== History ==
There is some debate about the early days of Fonthill and how it became named.

First, there seems to be a record of settlement growing in 1829 and the area being called “Osborne’s Corners” around 1842; next it was “Temperanceville” and finally “Fonthill” after Fonthill Abbey in England. Henry Giles, an early settler wrote his brother in England in July 1843 "The principal man in the new village, a reformed drunkard, wishes to name it Temperanceville which I tell him is a vile name... I have proposed the name of Fonthill. Mount Albion has also been talked of, but no name is yet fixed upon. It was named Temperanceville but the name of Fonthill was made somewhat official by an 1848 bylaw. Both names were in use with Temperanceville remaining into use as a local name until the 1860s or 70s and persisting in names like the Temperanceville Hotel. The post office dates from 1856.

Fonthill became an incorporated village in 1922.

Fonthill grew and smaller businesses did well.

One large business was Fonthill Nurseries. Started in 1837 the nursery, at its peak, rented or owned 1000 acres, employed 250 local people and shipped throughout Canada and abroad. The nursery closed in 1968.

A second large business was the Fonthill Canning Factory. Opening in 1912 primarily for the local tomato crop, they also canned local fruit. They factory employed about 260 local people and closed in 1958.

On June 10, 2006, Fonthill celebrated its 150th anniversary. The celebration was marked by the opening of the band stand (a replica of the original band stand that existed in the early 1900s), historical displays and a variety of musical and artistic presentations.

== Can-View Drive In ==
On May 20, 1996, Fonthill's Can-View Drive In was reportedly struck by a tornado, which resulted in the destruction of one of its four outdoor movie screens. The incident led to a widely reported urban legend that the screen was destroyed during a screening of the blockbuster film Twister (1996 film), with some purported witnesses even claiming that the incident took place during a point in the film depicting the destruction of a drive-in movie theater. Though largely discredited, the legend has produced numerous accounts over the years, including a 2018 short documentary produced by The Atlantic.

== Location ==
Fonthill is a fifteen-minute drive south of St. Catharines, five minutes northwest of Welland, twenty minutes west from Niagara Falls and twenty minutes north of Port Colborne. Its main access route is Highway 20, a portion of which is also known as Canboro Road, running west to east from Hamilton to Niagara Falls. Access to the United States is through either the Peace Bridge in Fort Erie, the Rainbow Bridge in Niagara Falls, or the Lewiston–Queenston Bridge in Queenston.

== Economy ==
In the Town of Pelham, Fonthill is the commercial centre where residents have access to basic shopping necessities. It also has the Town of Pelham Municipal offices. Several retirement homes are located in the village of Fonthill.

Plenty of greenspace areas are located within the Fonthill village. A series of public access trails, the primary system being the Steve Bauer trails which are named after a Pelham Olympian, are built into the residential planning of Fonthill. Harold Black Park, named for a former Mayor, plays host to the town's Canada Day festivities, which includes a parade down Haist Street. There is also a park named in honour of local golf legend Marlene Stewart Streit, which consists of a skate park, a large outdoor pool, and nature trails.

Fonthill has tried to balance its natural resources with a suitable development scheme, keeping an eye on a policy of smart growth.

Economic activities in the Town of Pelham ( Fonthill, Fenwick, Ridgeville and North Pelham) are diverse. Orchards of cherry, apple, and peach trees are located throughout the town. There are thousands of hectares of vineyards in Pelham (see also Viticulture) and a viable greenhouse industry.

Additionally, thousands of tonnes of aggregate material are removed each year from a large quarry at the top of the Fonthill Kame. Quarry sites in the area are usually rehabilitated. Fruit orchards have been developed in many of these sites, and a golf course occupies one.

== Education ==
Fonthill has three elementary schools:

- Glynn A. Green Elementary School (operated by the DSBN)
- A. K. Wigg Elementary School (operated by the DSBN)
- St. Alexander Catholic Elementary School (operated by the NCDSB) opened in 1958. In 2011, it had an enrollment of about 450 pupils.

It has one high school:

- E.L. Crossley Secondary School (operated by the DSBN) attended by just under 900 students

Other educational resources:

- No. 613 Royal Canadian Army Cadet Corps is based at the local Royal Canadian Legion hall. It is affiliated with the Lincoln and Welland Regiment.
- Fonthill Montessori Preschool takes children from 18 months to six years old. This is a private school.
