= List of Detroit Red Wings players =

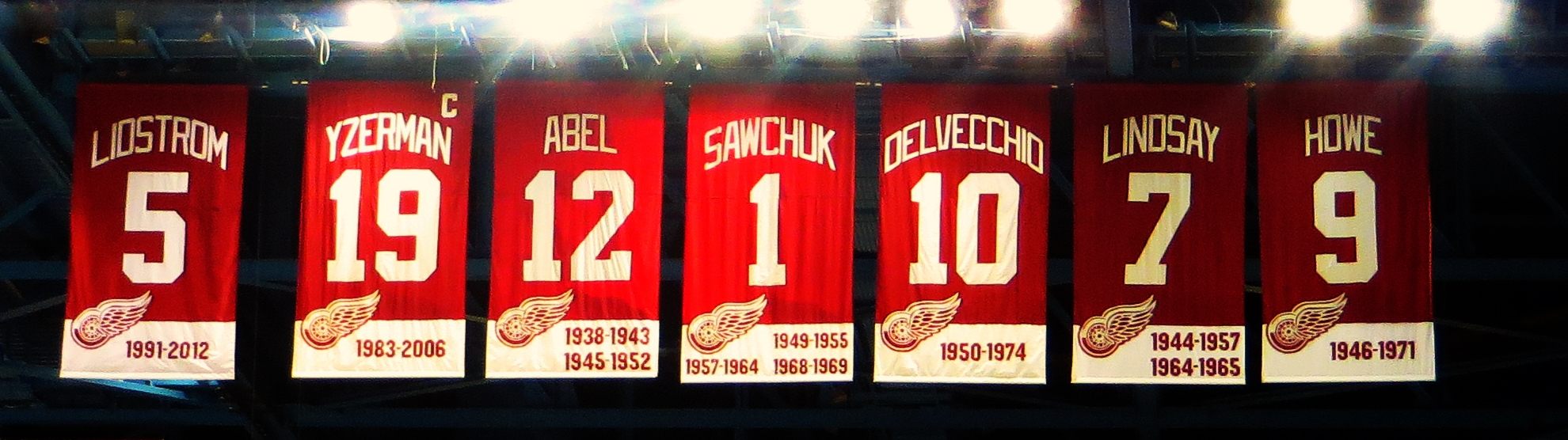
The banners that hung in Joe Louis Arena represent those Red Wings players whose uniform numbers have been retired.

The Detroit Red Wings are a professional ice hockey team based in Detroit, Michigan. They are members of the Atlantic Division of the National Hockey League's (NHL) Eastern Conference. The Red Wings franchise has been a part of the NHL since 1926, making them one of the "Original Six" clubs. Originally named the Detroit Cougars, the team was renamed to the Detroit Falcons in 1930; in 1932, the team's name was changed to the Detroit Red Wings and has remained the same since. As of the conclusion of the 2014–15 NHL season, 897 players have played for the franchise; of them, 91 of them are goaltenders, while 806 are skaters.

Since its inception, the team has had 36 captains, including Hall of Famers Sid Abel, Ted Lindsay, Red Kelly, Gordie Howe, Alex Delvecchio, Steve Yzerman, and Nicklas Lidström. Seven players have had the honor of having their uniform number officially retired from play; one of them is Yzerman, who played for the Red Wings from 1983 to 2006, and was the longest-serving captain in North American major league sports, with a tenure of 19 years. Yzerman led his team to three Stanley Cups and was the recipient of several awards, including the Ted Lindsay Award and Lester Patrick Trophy for his outstanding play and contributions to the sport. A total of 58 Detroit players have been inducted into the Hockey Hall of Fame.

Gordie Howe holds regular season records for most games played (1687), most points (1809), and most goals (786). Howe was a member of a Stanley Cup-winning team four times with the Red Wings and his uniform number 9 was retired by the club. Yzerman holds the regular season record for most assists with 1063, while Bob Probert's 2090 penalty minutes in the regular season is also a club record. Yzerman also leads the team in points and goals scored in the playoffs with 185 and 70, respectively. Lidstrom holds team marks with 129 assists and 263 games played in the playoffs. Darren McCarty leads the team with 228 post season penalty minutes.

Amongst goaltenders, Terry Sawchuk holds the regular season lead in games played (734), wins (351), losses (243), ties (132), and shutouts (85). Sawchuk won the Stanley Cup three times in Detroit, was inducted into the Hockey Hall of Fame, and had his uniform number 1 retired by the team. Chris Osgood, who also won the Stanley Cup three times with the Red Wings, leads club goaltenders in many playoff statistics. Osgood's 110 games played, 67 wins, and 14 shutouts are all team records in the playoffs. Sawchuk and Osgood are tied for the lead with 37 post season losses.

== Key ==
Appeared in a Red Wings game during the 2025–26 NHL season or is still part of the organization.
Stanley Cup winner, retired jersey or elected to the Hockey Hall of Fame

General abbreviations
Abbreviation	Definition
GP	Games played
HHOF	Inducted into the Hockey Hall of Fame as a player
SC	Won the Stanley Cup with the team, followed by year(s) won
Ret	Uniform number retired by the team

Goaltender statistical abbreviations
Abbreviation	Definition
W	Wins
L	Losses
T^{[a]}	Ties
OTL^{[a]}	Overtime loss
SO	Shutouts
GAA	Goals against average
SV%^{[b]}	Save percentage

Skater statistical abbreviations
Abbreviation	Definition
Pos	Position
G	Goals
A	Assists
P	Points
PIM	Penalty minutes
D	Defenceman
LW	Left wing
C	Centre
RW	Right wing

Statistics are complete to the end of the 2025–26 NHL season.

== Goaltenders ==
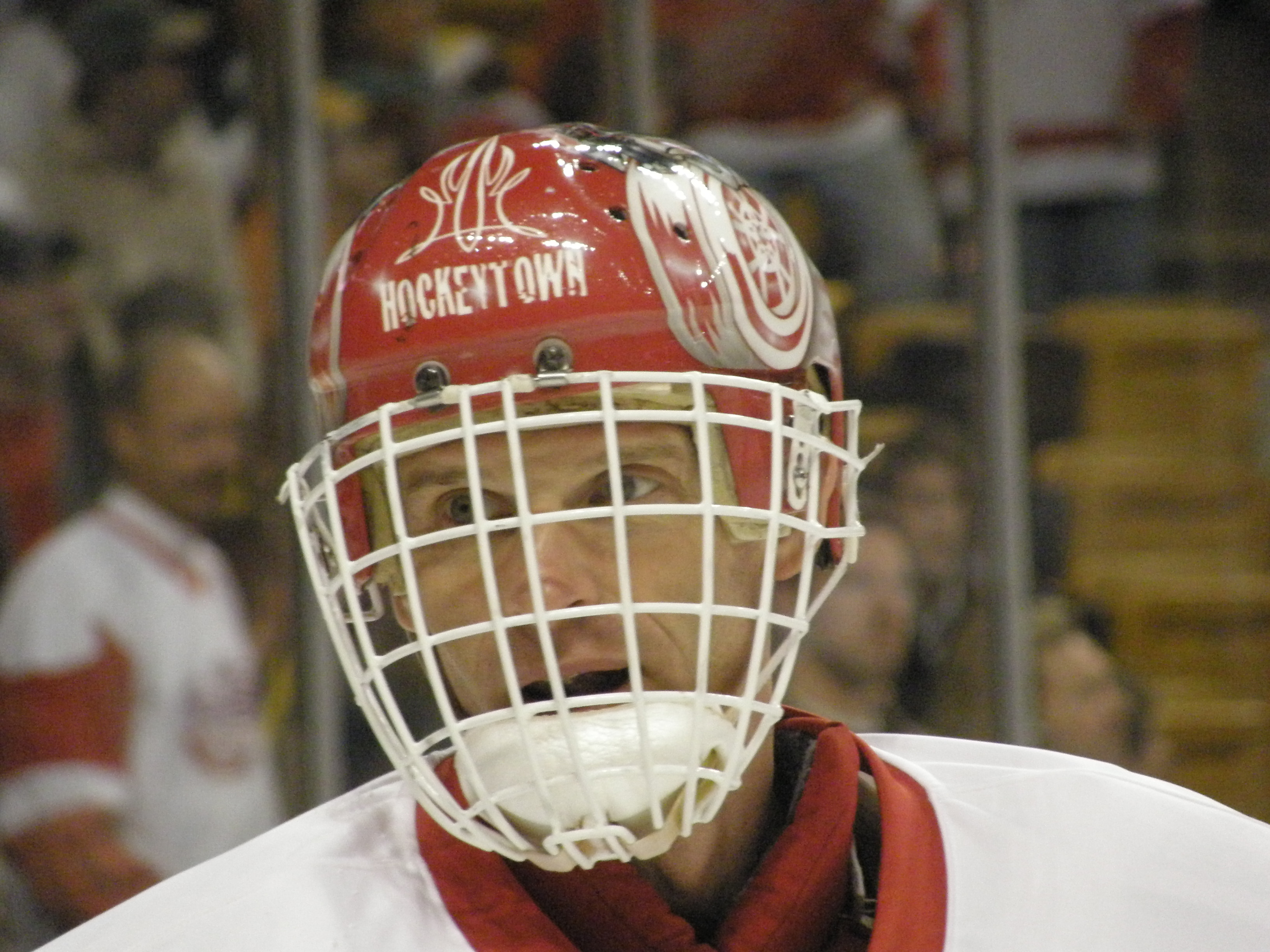
- Dominik Hašek played for the Red Wings for four seasons.
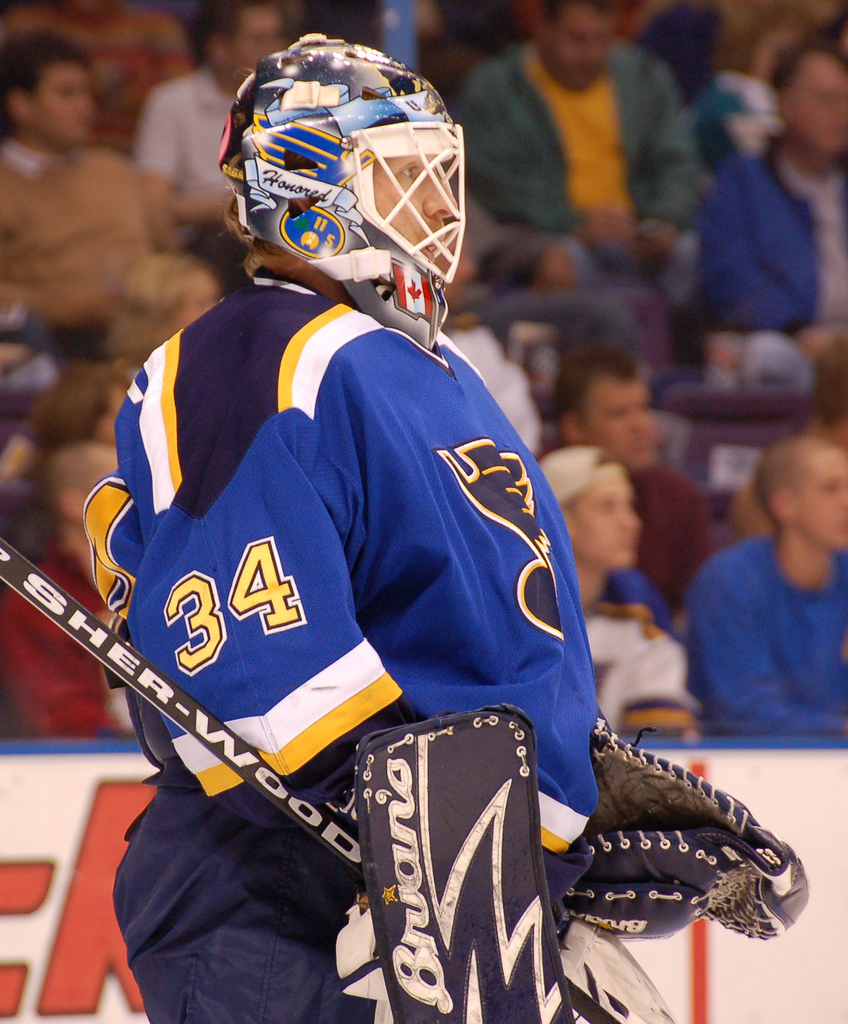
- Manny Legace was a part of the 2002 Stanley Cup champion Detroit Red Wings.
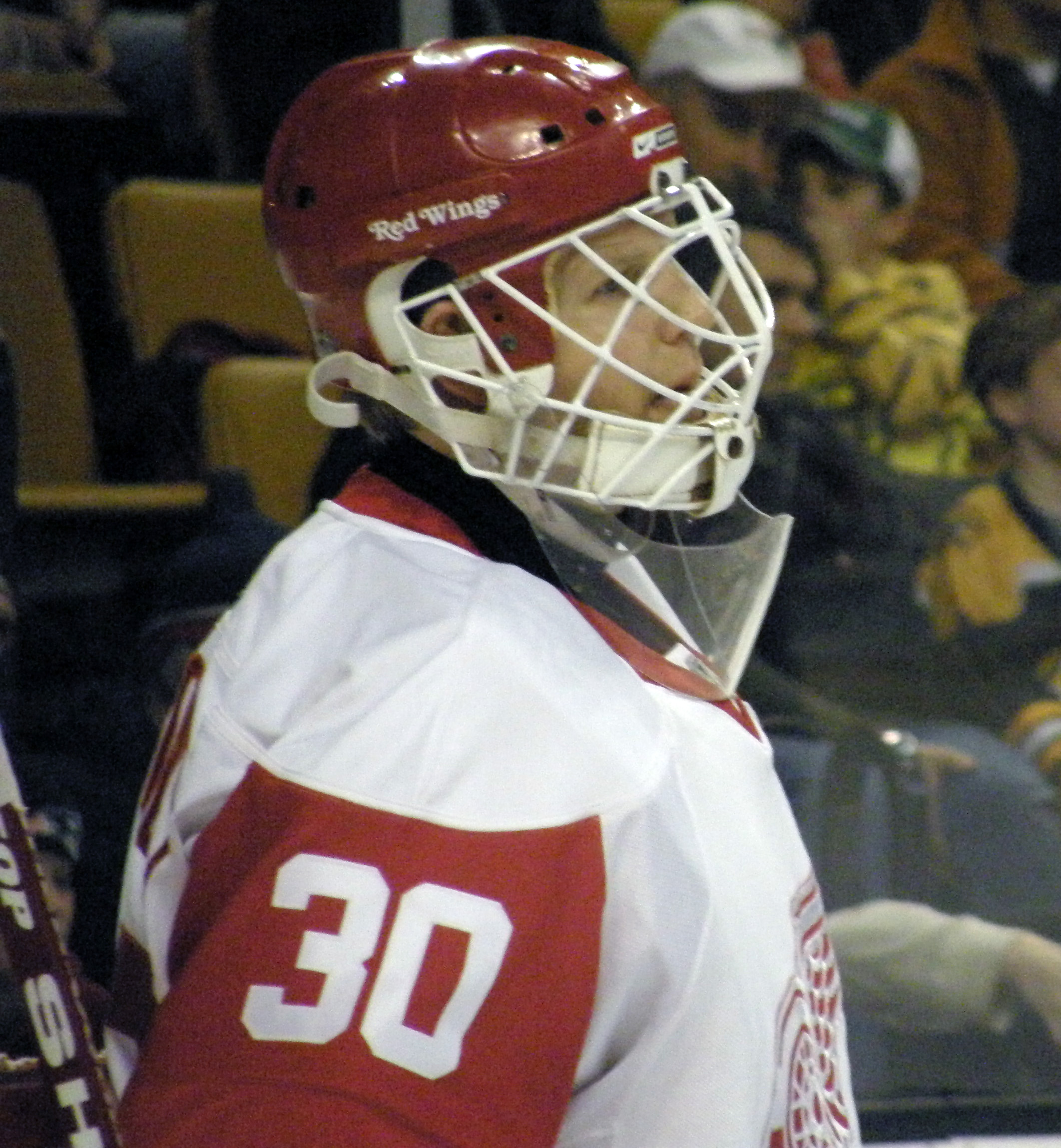
- Chris Osgood played in more playoff games and earned more playoff wins than any other goaltender in team history.

Goaltenders who have played for the franchise
Name	Nat	Seasons	GP	W	L	T	OTL	SO	GAA	SV%	GP	W	L	SO	GAA	SV%	Notes
Name	Nat	Seasons	Regular-season								Playoffs						Notes
Red Almas	(Canada)	1946–1947; 1952–1953	2	0	1	1	—	0	4.00	—	5	1	3	0	2.97	—	
Hank Bassen	(Canada)	1960–1964; 1965–1967	99	34	37	19	—	3	2.95	.895	5	1	3	0	2.41	.920	
Jonathan Bernier	(Canada)	2018–2021	105	33	51	—	9	2	3.02	.908	—	—	—	—	—	—	
Allan Bester	(Canada)	1990–1992	4	0	3	0	0	0	4.32	.861	1	0	0	0	3.00	.917	
Bill Beveridge	(Canada)	1929–1930	39	14	20	5	—	2	2.71	—	—	—	—	—	—	—	
Gilles Boisvert	(Canada)	1959–1960	3	0	3	0	—	0	3.00	.890	—	—	—	—	—	—	
Claude Bourque	(Canada)	1939–1940	1	0	1	0	—	0	3.00	—	—	—	—	—	—	—	
Andy Brown	(Canada)	1971–1973	17	6	6	3	—	0	3.81	.882	—	—	—	—	—	—	
Bob Champoux	(Canada)	1963–1964	—	—	—	—	—	—	—	—	1	1	0	0	4.36	.778	
Tim Cheveldae	(Canada)	1988–1994	264	128	93	30	7	9	3.40	.882	25	9	15	2	3.00	.896	
Alain Chevrier	(Canada)	1990–1991	3	0	2	0	0	0	6.14	.800	—	—	—	—	—	—	
Eric Comrie	(Canada)	2019–2020	3	0	2	—	0	0	4.28	.864	—	—	—	—	—	—	
Ty Conklin	(United States)	2008–2009; 2011–2012	55	30	17	0	3	7	2.71	.902	1	0	0	0	0.00	1.000	
Alec Connell	(Canada)	1931–1932	48	18	20	10	—	6	2.12	—	2	0	1	0	1.50	—	HHOF – 1958
Jared Coreau	(Canada)	2016–2018	21	5	9	—	4	2	4.26	.867	—	—	—	—	—	—	
Sebastian Cossa	(Canada)	2024–2025	1	1	0	—	0	0	2.67	.857	—	—	—	—	—	—	
Abbie Cox	(Canada)	1933–1934	2	0	0	1	—	0	2.75	—	—	—	—	—	—	—	
Roger Crozier	(Canada)	1963–1970	313	131	121	41	—	20	2.93	.904	23	9	12	1	2.74	.898	
Wilf Cude	(Canada)	1933–1934	29	15	6	8	—	4	1.52	—	9	4	5	1	2.12	—	
Thomas Daley	(Canada)	1971–1972	29	11	10	5	—	0	3.15	.893	—	—	—	—	—	—	
Denis DeJordy	(Canada)	1972–1974	25	8	12	3	—	1	3.86	.859	—	—	—	—	—	—	
Connie Dion	(Canada)	1943–1945	38	23	11	4	—	1	3.13	—	5	1	4	0	3.40	—	
Dolly Dolson	(Canada)	1928–1931	93	35	41	17	—	12	2.14	—	2	0	2	2	3.50	—	
Roy Edwards	(Canada)	1967–1971; 1972–1974	221	95	80	34	—	12	2.94	.902	4	0	3	0	3.20	.909	
Darren Eliot	(Canada)	1987–1988	3	0	0	1	0	0	5.52	.839	—	—	—	—	—	—	
Bob Essensa	(Canada)	1993–1994	13	4	7	2	0	1	2.62	.899	2	0	2	0	4.94	.791	
Jimmy Franks	(Canada)	1936–1937; 1943–1944	18	7	8	3	—	1	4.00	—	1	0	1	0	4.00	—	SC: 1937
Kaden Fulcher	(Canada)	2018–2019	1	0	0	—	0	0	4.41	.818	—	—	—	—	—	—	
Dave Gagnon	(Canada)	1990–1991	2	0	1	0	0	0	10.30	.786	—	—	—	—	—	—	
George Gardner	(Canada)	1965–1968	24	7	8	2	—	0	3.59	.889	—	—	—	—	—	—	
Dave Gatherum	(Canada)	1953–1954	3	2	0	1	—	1	1.00	—	—	—	—	—	—	—	SC: 1954
Eddie Giacomin	(Canada)	1975–1978	71	23	37	7	—	5	3.47	.883	—	—	—	—	—	—	HHOF – 1987
John Gibson	(United States)	2025–2026	57	29	22	—	4	4	2.72	.901	—	—	—	—	—	—	
Gilles Gilbert	(Canada)	1980–1983	95	21	48	16	—	0	4.18	.858	—	—	—	—	—	—	
Doug Grant	(Canada)	1973–1976	46	17	22	2	—	1	4.34	.862	—	—	—	—	—	—	
Gerry Gray	(Canada)	1970–1971	7	1	4	1	—	0	4.74	.869	—	—	—	—	—	—	
Harrison Gray	(Canada)	1963–1964	1	0	1	0	—	0	7.50	.839	—	—	—	—	—	—	
Thomas Greiss	(Germany)	2020–2022	65	18	30	—	9	2	3.14	.901	—	—	—	—	—	—	
Jonas Gustavsson	(Sweden)	2012–2015	41	21	10	—	6	1	2.67	.904	2	0	2	0	2.72	.917	
Glenn Hall	(Canada)	1952–1953; 1954–1957	148	74	45	29	—	17	2.12	.926	15	6	9	0	2.85	.902	HHOF – 1975
Glen Hanlon	(Canada)	1986–1991	186	65	71	26	2	7	3.47	.884	18	9	6	3	2.58	.905	
Dominik Hašek	(Czech Republic)	2001–2002; 2003–2004; 2006–2008	176	114	39	10	12	20	2.13	.911	45	28	17	8	1.91	.919	HHOF – 2014; SC: 2002, 2008
Magnus Hellberg	(Sweden)	2021–2023	18	5	8	—	1	0	3.27	.884	—	—	—	—	—	—	
Kevin Hodson	(Canada)	1995–1999	35	13	7	4	0	4	2.37	.909	1	0	0	0	0.00	—	SC: 1997, 1998
Ken Holland	(Canada)	1983–1984	3	0	1	1	—	0	4.11	.804	—	—	—	—	—	—	
Hap Holmes	(Canada)	1926–1928	85	30	45	10	—	17	1.98	—	—	—	—	—	—	—	HHOF – 1972
Jimmy Howard	(United States)	2005–2020	543	246	196	—	70	24	2.62	.912	48	21	26	3	2.58	.918	SC: 2008
Ville Husso	(Finland)	2022–2025	84	36	32	—	11	4	3.26	.892	—	—	—	—	—	—	
Michael Hutchinson	(Canada)	2023–2024	1	0	1	—	0	0	3.11	.917	—	—	—	—	—	—	
Peter Ing	(Canada)	1993–1994	3	1	2	0	0	0	5.28	.853	—	—	—	—	—	—	
Al Jensen	(Canada)	1980–1981	1	0	1	0	—	0	7.00	.767	—	—	—	—	—	—	
Curtis Joseph	(Canada)	2002–2004	92	50	29	9	5	7	2.46	.911	13	4	8	1	1.64	.931	
Scott King	(Canada)	1990–1992	2	0	0	0	—	0	2.93	.813	—	—	—	—	—	—	
Mark Laforest	(Canada)	1985–1987	33	6	22	0	—	1	4.74	.851	—	—	—	—	—	—	
Marc Lamothe	(Canada)	2002–2004	2	1	0	1	0	0	1.45	.948	—	—	—	—	—	—	
Manny Legace	(Canada)	1999–2006	180	112	34	16	6	13	2.18	.918	11	4	6	0	2.54	.888	SC: 2002
Claude Legris	(Canada)	1980–1982	4	0	1	1	—	0	2.64	.923	—	—	—	—	—	—	
Ron Low	(Canada)	1977–1978	32	9	12	9	—	1	3.37	.886	4	1	3	0	4.25	.879	
Larry Lozinski	(Canada)	1980–1981	30	6	11	7	—	0	4.32	.858	—	—	—	—	—	—	
Harry Lumley	(Canada)	1943–1950	324	163	105	56	—	26	2.75	—	54	24	30	6	2.30	—	HHOF – 1980; SC: 1950
Alex Lyon	(United States)	2023–2025	74	35	27	—	6	3	2.96	.901	—	—	—	—	—	—	
Joey MacDonald	(Canada)	2006–2007; 2010–2012	37	14	15	0	5	1	2.62	.905	—	—	—	—	—	—	
Norm Maracle	(Canada)	1997–1999	20	8	5	3	0	0	2.22	.916	2	0	0	0	3.08	.864	
Tom McCollum	(United States)	2010–2015	3	1	0	—	0	0	2.98	.879	—	—	—	—	—	—	
Peter McDuffe	(Canada)	1975–1976	4	0	3	1	—	0	5.50	.858	—	—	—	—	—	—	
Tom McGrattan	(Canada)	1947–1948	1	0	0	0	—	0	7.50	—	—	—	—	—	—	—	
Bill McKenzie	(Canada)	1973–1975	26	5	13	6	—	1	4.15	.873	—	—	—	—	—	—	
Don McLeod	(Canada)	1970–1971	14	3	7	0	—	0	5.16	.852	—	—	—	—	—	—	
Corrado Micalef	(Canada)	1981–1986	113	26	59	15	—	2	4.24	.856	3	0	0	0	9.80	.652	
Gregory Millen	(Canada)	1991–1992	10	3	2	3	0	0	2.71	.896	—	—	—	—	—	—	
Edward Mio	(Canada)	1983–1986	49	10	21	5	—	1	5.00	.842	1	0	1	0	2.86	.875	
Alfie Moore	(Canada)	1939–1940	1	0	1	0	—	0	3.00	—	—	—	—	—	—	—	
Johnny Mowers	(Canada)	1940–1943; 1946–1947	152	65	61	26	—	15	2.56	—	32	19	13	2	2.55	—	SC: 1943
Petr Mrázek	(Czech Republic)	2012–2018; 2024–2025	171	74	60	—	20	14	2.60	.912	10	4	6	3	1.88	.931	
Alex Nedeljkovic	(United States)	2021–2023	74	25	31	—	11	4	3.35	.900	—	—	—	—	—	—	
Chris Osgood	(Canada)	1993–2001; 2006–2011	565	317	149	46	36	39	2.49	.905	110	67	37	14	2.02	.918	SC: 1997, 1998, 2008
Bob Perreault	(Canada)	1958–1959	3	2	1	0	—	1	3.00	.895	—	—	—	—	—	—	
Calvin Pickard	(Canada)	2019–2022	12	3	4	—	1	0	4.04	.853	—	—	—	—	—	—	
Chris Pusey	(Canada)	1985–1986	1	0	0	0	—	0	4.50	.750	—	—	—	—	—	—	
Bill Ranford	(Canada)	1998–1999	4	3	0	1	0	0	1.96	.918	4	2	2	1	3.27	.905	
James Reimer	(Canada)	2023–2024	25	11	8	—	2	2	3.11	.904	—	—	—	—	—	—	
Terrance Richardson	(Canada)	1973–1977	19	3	10	0	—	0	5.39	.824	—	—	—	—	—	—	
Vincent Riendeau	(Canada)	1991–1994	32	17	8	2	0	0	3.29	.870	2	1	0	0	3.28	.867	
Dennis Riggin	(Canada)	1959–1960; 1962–1963	18	6	10	2	—	1	3.19	.886	—	—	—	—	—	—	
John Ross Roach	(Canada)	1932–1935	90	41	34	14	—	15	2.20	—	4	2	2	1	2.00	—	
Earl Robertson	(Canada)	1936–1937	—	—	—	—	—	—	—	—	6	3	2	2	1.41	—	SC: 1937
Pat Rupp	(United States)	1963–1964	1	0	1	0	—	0	4.00	.867	—	—	—	—	—	—	
Jim Rutherford	(Canada)	1970–1971; 1973–1981; 1982–1983	314	97	165	43	—	10	3.69	.876	3	2	1	0	4.00	.862	
Bob Sauve	(Canada)	1981–1982	41	11	25	4	—	0	4.19	.846	—	—	—	—	—	—	
Terry Sawchuk	(Canada)	1949–1955; 1957–1964; 1968–1969	734	351	243	132	—	85	2.44	.904	85	46	37	11	2.41	.892	HHOF – 1971; SC: 1952, 1954, 1955; Ret # 1
Al Smith	(Canada)	1971–1972	43	18	20	4	—	4	3.24	.892	—	—	—	—	—	—	
Normie Smith	(Canada)	1935–1939; 1943–1945	178	76	71	31	—	17	2.26	—	12	9	2	3	1.32	—	SC: 1936, 1937
Sam St. Laurent	(Canada)	1986–1990	30	5	11	4	1	0	3.43	.887	1	0	0	0	5.82	.857	
Greg Stefan	(Canada)	1981–1990	299	115	127	30	1	5	3.92	.868	30	12	17	1	3.54	.875	
Herb Stuart	(Canada)	1926–1927	3	1	2	—	—	0	1.67	—	—	—	—	—	—	—	
Cam Talbot	(Canada)	2024–2026	81	33	28	—	11	2	3.03	.894	—	—	—	—	—	—	
Harvey Teno	(Canada)	1938–1939	5	2	3	0	—	0	3.00	—	—	—	—	—	—	—	
Tiny Thompson	(Canada)	1938–1940	85	32	41	12	—	7	2.54	—	11	5	6	1	2.40	—	HHOF – 1959
Joe Turner	(Canada)	1941–1942	1	0	0	1	—	0	2.57	—	—	—	—	—	—	—	
Rogie Vachon	(Canada)	1978–1980	109	30	57	19	—	4	3.74	.868	—	—	—	—	—	—	HHOF – 2016
Mike Vernon	(Canada)	1994–1997	95	53	24	14	2	4	2.40	.898	42	30	12	2	2.08	.907	SC: 1997
Carl Wetzel	(United States)	1964–1965	2	0	1	0	—	0	7.50	.778	—	—	—	—	—	—	
Lefty Wilson	(Canada)	1953–1954	1	0	0	0	—	0	0.00	—	—	—	—	—	—	—	
Ken Wregget	(Canada)	1999–2000	29	14	10	2	1	0	2.66	.900	—	—	—	—	—	—	
Doug Young	(Canada)	1933–1934	1	0	0	0	—	0	2.86	—	—	—	—	—	—	—	

== Skaters ==
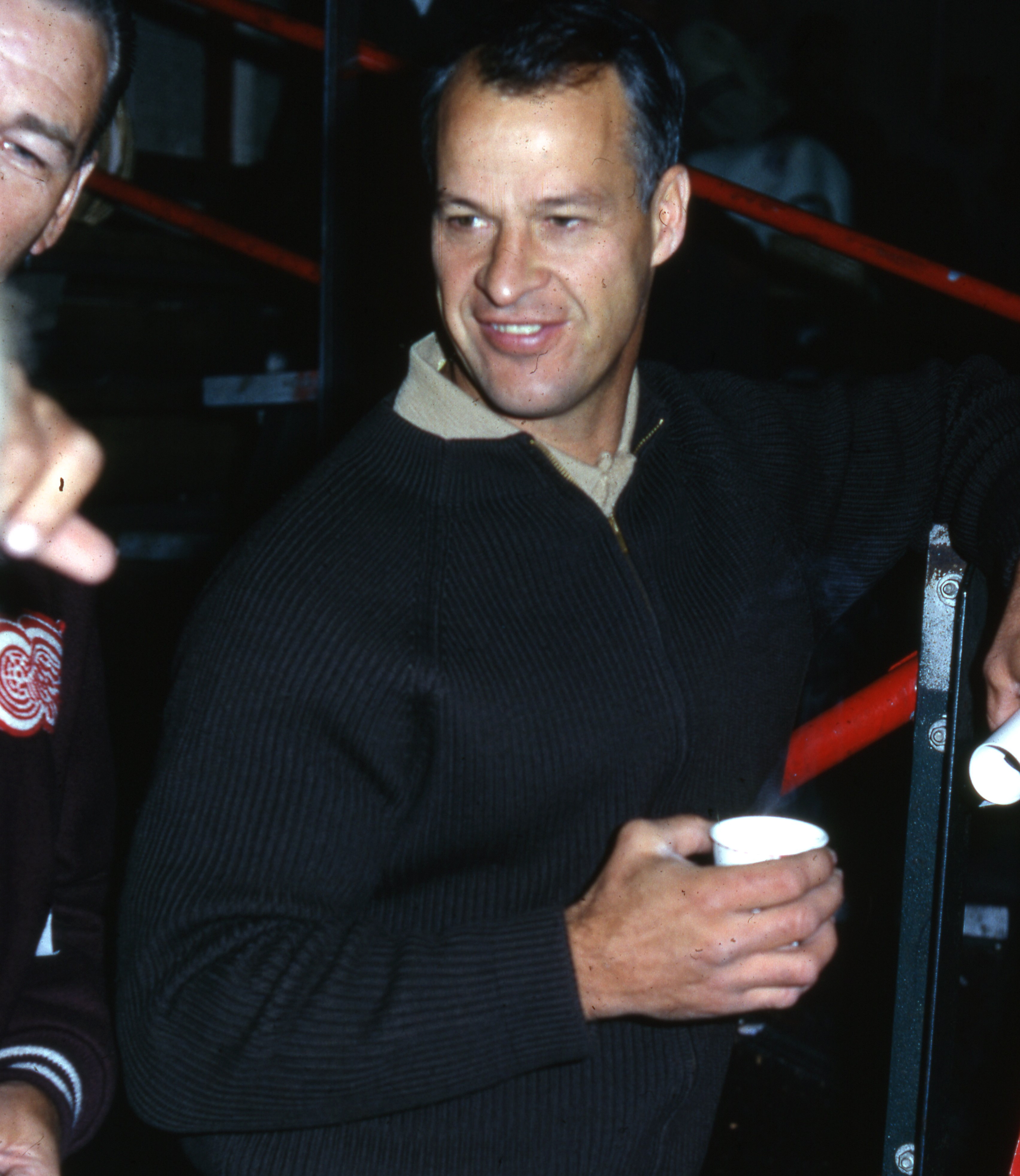
- Gordie Howe played for Detroit for 24 seasons and was inducted into the Hockey Hall of Fame in 1972.
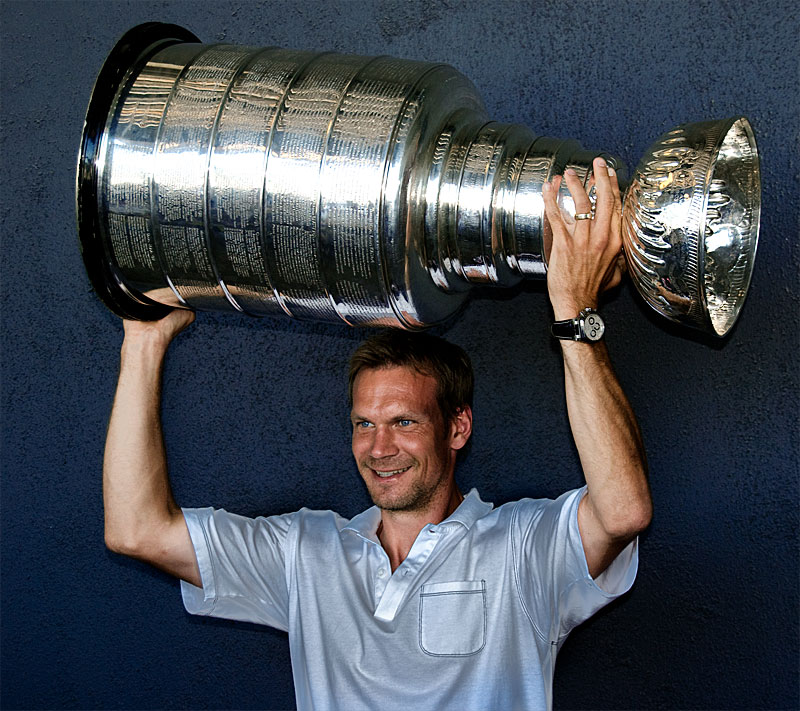
- Nicklas Lidstrom was a member of four Stanley Cup winning teams.
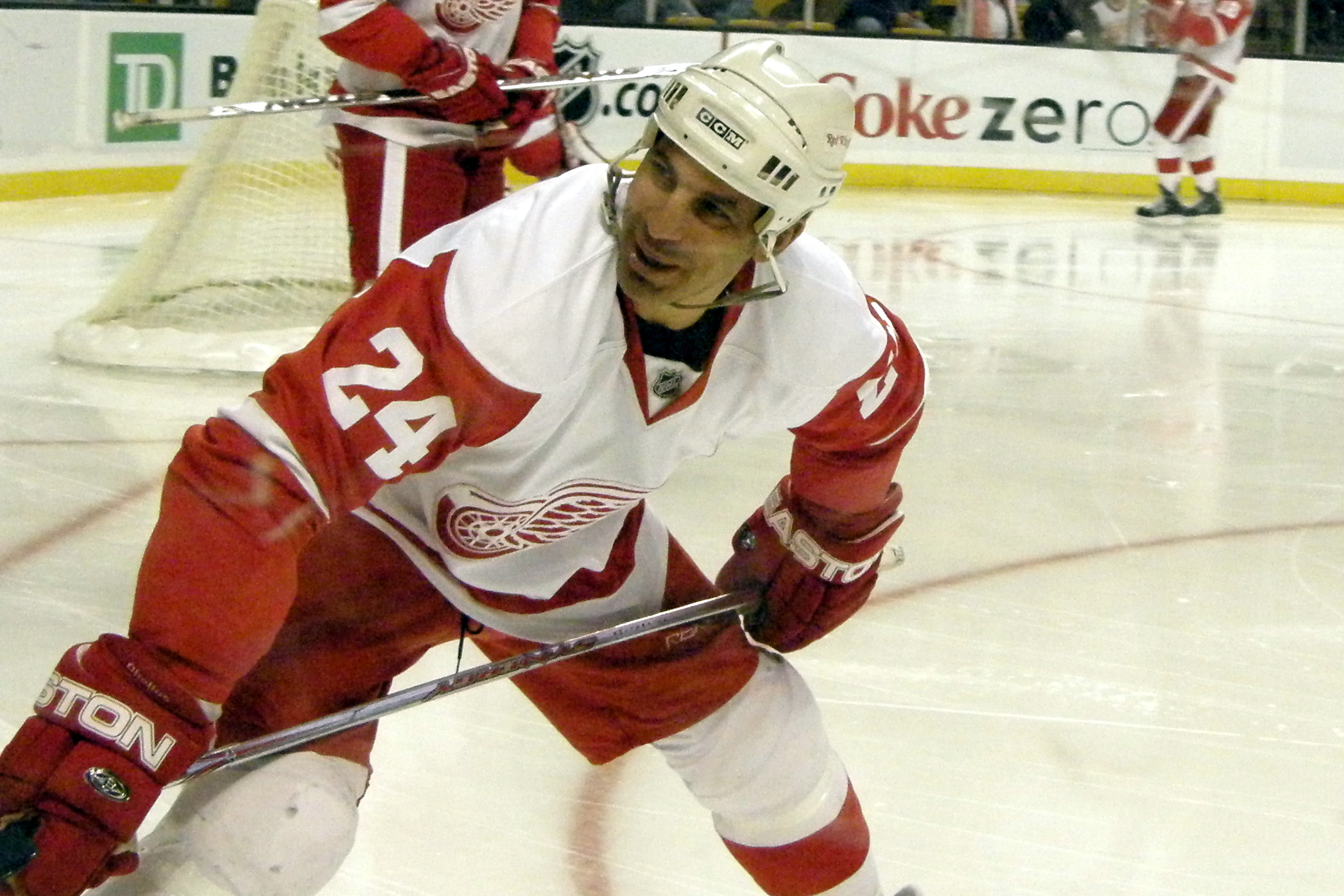
- Chris Chelios was a Red Wing from 1999 through the 2008–09 season.
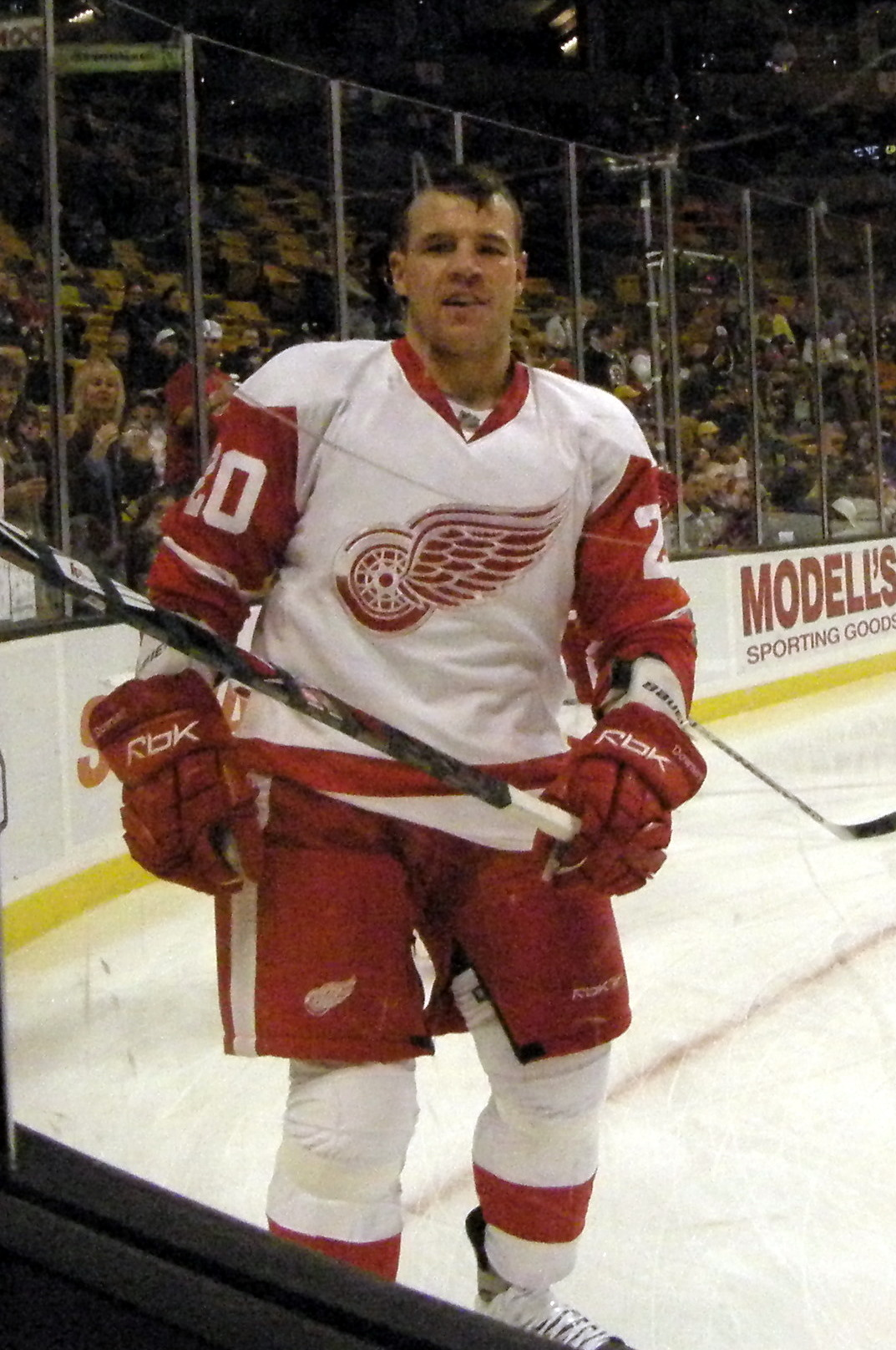
- Aaron Downey played in 60 Red Wing games and accrued 123 penalty minutes.
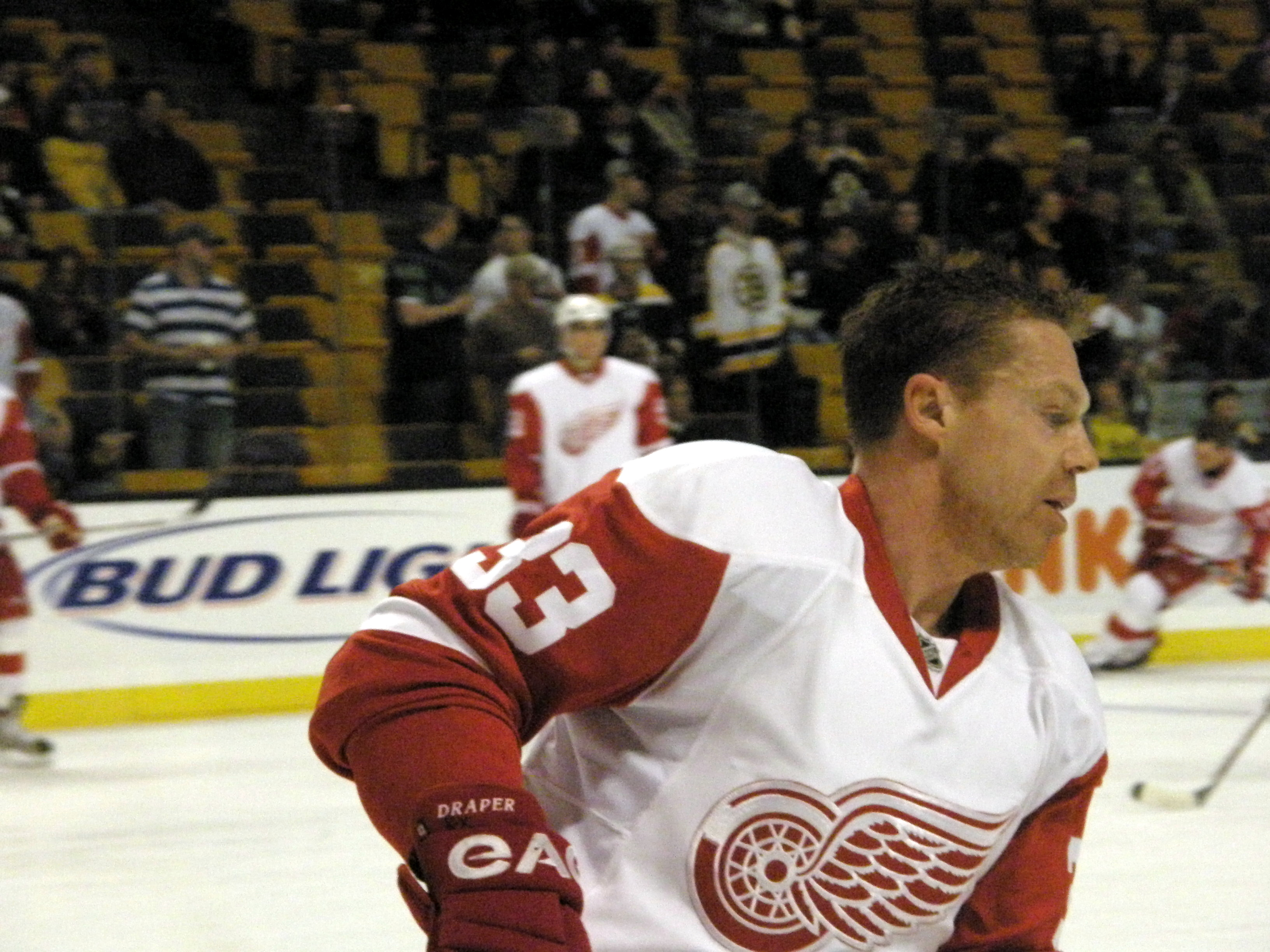
- Kris Draper joined the Red Wings in 1993.
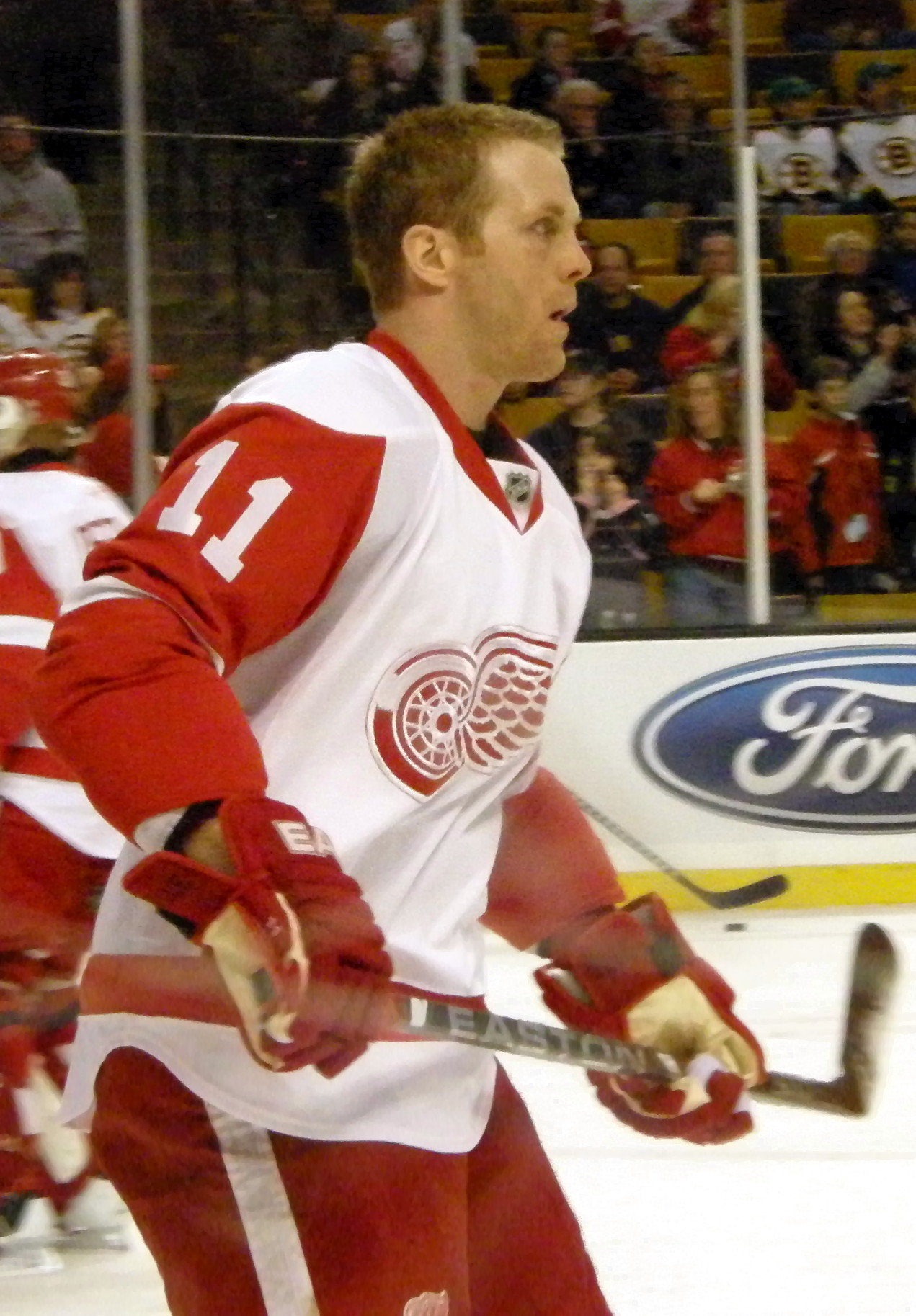
- Daniel Cleary was a part of the 2007–08 Stanley Cup Championship team.
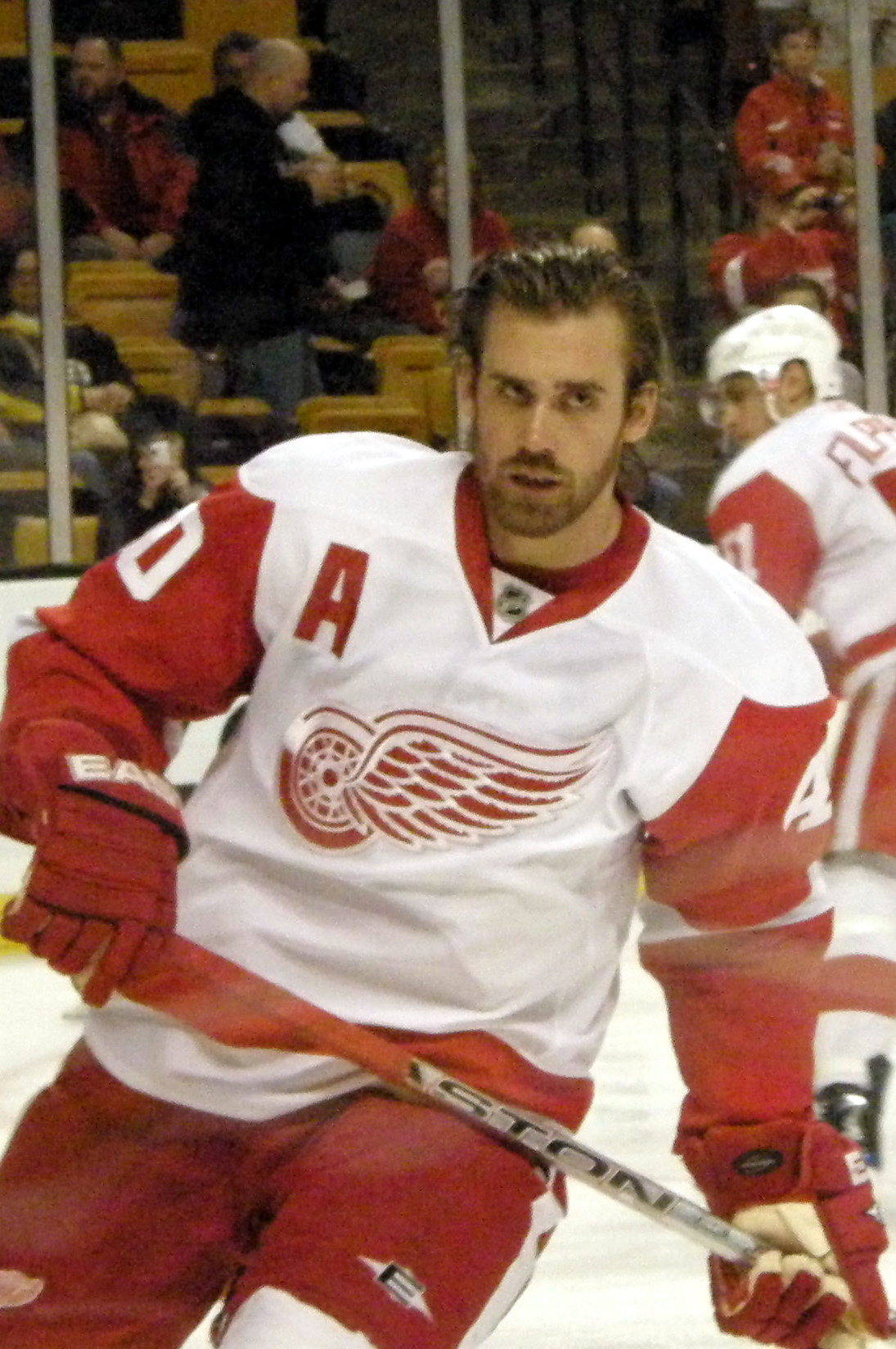
- Henrik Zetterberg has played for the team since 2002.
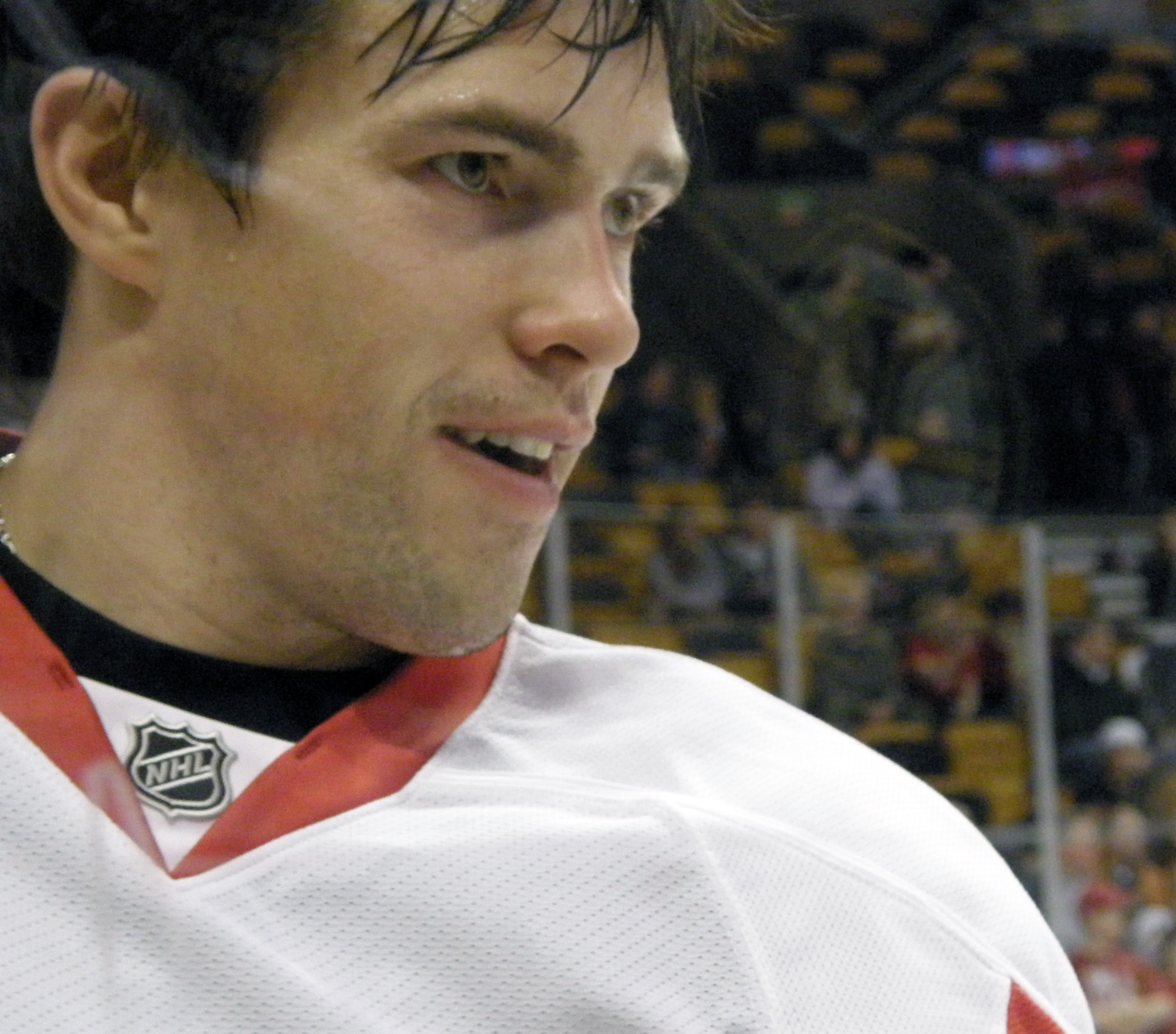
- Pavel Datsyuk has won two Stanley Cup championships with Detroit.

Skaters who have played for the franchise
Name	Nationality	Pos	Seasons^{[c]}	GP	G	A	P	PIM	GP	G	A	P	PIM	Notes
Name	Nationality	Pos	Seasons^{[c]}	Regular-season					Playoffs					Notes
Justin Abdelkader	United States	LW	2007–2020	739	106	146	252	608	64	6	7	13	140	
Gerry Abel	United States	LW	1966–1967	1	0	0	0	0	—	—	—	—	—	
Sid Abel†	Canada	C	1938–1943; 1945–1952	570	184	279	463	366	96	28	30	58	79	HHOF – 1969; SC: 1943, 1950, 1952; Ret # 12
Gene Achtymichuk	Canada	C	1958–1959	12	0	0	0	0	—	—	—	—	—	
Greg Adams	Canada	LW	1989–1990	28	3	7	10	16	—	—	—	—	—	
Micah Aivazoff	Canada	C	1993–1994	59	4	4	8	38	—	—	—	—	—	
Gary Aldcorn	Canada	LW	1959–1961	119	24	35	59	48	6	1	2	3	4	
Daniel Alfredsson	Sweden	RW	2013–2014	68	18	31	49	10	3	0	0	0	2	
Keith Allen†	Canada	D	1953–1955	28	0	4	4	8	5	0	0	0	0	SC: 1954
Adam Almqvist	Sweden	D	2013–2014	2	1	0	1	0	—	—	—	—	—	
Dave Amadio	Canada	D	1957–1958	2	0	0	0	2	2	0	0	0	0	
Dale Anderson	Canada	D	1956–1957	13	0	0	0	6	—	—	—	—	—	
Earl Anderson	United States	RW	1974–1975	45	7	3	10	12	—	—	—	—	—	
Ron Anderson	Canada	RW	1967–1969	25	2	0	2	21	—	—	—	—	—	
Tommy Anderson	Canada	LW	1934–1935	27	5	2	7	16	—	—	—	—	—	
Joakim Andersson	Sweden	C	2011–2016	205	15	21	36	48	27	2	6	8	14	
Mason Appleton	United States	C	2025–2026	65	6	8	14	44	—	—	—	—	—	
Al Arbour†	Canada	D	1953–1954; 1955–1958	149	2	13	15	160	13	0	2	2	10	SC: 1954
Jack Arbour	Canada	D	1926–1927	37	4	1	5	46	—	—	—	—	—	
Murray Armstrong	Canada	C	1943–1946	118	35	64	99	39	24	4	6	10	2	
Brent Ashton	Canada	LW	1986–1988	108	41	43	84	72	32	11	14	25	16	
Ossie Asmundson	Canada	C	1934–1935	3	0	0	0	0	—	—	—	—	—	
Zach Aston-Reese	United States	C	2023–2024	3	0	0	0	2	—	—	—	—	—	
Andreas Athanasiou	Canada	C	2015–2020	294	83	71	154	113	5	1	0	1	0	
Pierre Aubry	Canada	C	1983–1985	39	6	3	9	41	3	0	0	0	2	
Philippe Audet	Canada	LW	1998–1999	4	0	0	0	0	—	—	—	—	—	
Larry Aurie†	Canada	RW	1927–1939	489	147	129	276	279	22	6	9	15	14	SC: 1936, 1937
Sean Avery	Canada	LW	2001–2003	75	7	8	15	188	—	—	—	—	—	
Pete Babando†	Canada	LW	1949–1950	56	6	6	12	25	8	2	2	4	2	SC: 1950
Garnet Bailey	Canada	LW	1972–1974	58	11	25	36	49	—	—	—	—	—	
Bob Bailey	Canada	RW	1956–1958	36	6	6	12	41	9	0	2	2	18	
Doug Baldwin	Canada	D	1946–1947	4	0	0	0	0	—	—	—	—	—	
Riley Barber	United States	RW	2021–2022	4	0	0	0	2	—	—	—	—	—	
Doug Barkley	Canada	D	1962–1966	247	24	80	104	380	30	0	9	9	63	
Ryan Barnes	Canada	LW	2003–2004	2	0	0	0	0	—	—	—	—	—	
Dave Barr	Canada	RW	1986–1991	293	82	118	200	276	35	9	8	17	42	
John Barrett	Canada	D	1980–1986	418	18	71	89	547	7	0	1	1	15	
Marty Barry†	Canada	C	1935–1939	191	60	94	154	60	23	9	12	21	8	HHOF – 1965, SC: 1936
Francis Bathe	Canada	D	1974–1976	26	0	4	4	40	—	—	—	—	—	
Andy Bathgate	Canada	RW	1965–1967	130	23	55	78	49	12	6	3	9	6	HHOF – 1978
Bobby Baun	Canada	D	1968–1971	158	5	37	42	257	4	0	0	0	6	
Sergei Bautin	Russia	D	1993–1994	1	0	0	0	0	—	—	—	—	—	
Jack Beattie	Canada	LW	1937–1938	11	1	2	3	0	—	—	—	—	—	
Dick Behling	Canada	D	1940–1941; 1942–1943	5	1	0	1	2	—	—	—	—	—	
Pete Bellefeuille	Canada	RW	1926–1930	43	12	2	14	24	—	—	—	—	—	
Frank Bennett	Canada	LW	1943–1944	7	0	1	1	2	—	—	—	—	—	
Red Berenson	Canada	C	1970–1975	283	73	128	201	64	—	—	—	—	—	
Michel Bergeron	Canada	RW	1974–1978	174	64	46	110	156	—	—	—	—	—	
Marc Bergevin	Canada	D	1995–1996	70	1	9	10	33	17	1	0	1	14	
Jonatan Berggren	Sweden	RW	2022–2026	169	31	33	64	38	—	—	—	—	—	
Gary Bergman	Canada	D	1964–1975	706	60	243	303	1101	21	0	5	5	20	
Thommie Bergman	Sweden	D	1972–1975; 1977–1980	246	21	44	65	243	7	0	2	2	2	
Jacob Bernard-Docker	Canada	D	2025–2026	63	1	4	5	25	—	—	—	—	—	
Fred Berry	Canada	C	1976–1977	3	0	0	0	0	—	—	—	—	—	
Todd Bertuzzi	Canada	RW	2006–2007; 2009–2014	308	61	89	150	263	51	7	17	24	55	
Tyler Bertuzzi	Canada	LW	2016–2023	305	88	114	202	189	—	—	—	—	—	
Phil Besler	Canada	RW	1938–1939	5	0	1	1	2	—	—	—	—	—	
Pete Bessone	United States	D	1937–1938	6	0	1	1	6	—	—	—	—	—	
Alex Biega	Canada	D	2019–2021	62	0	6	6	28	—	—	—	—	—	
Tom Bissett	Canada	LW	1990–1991	5	0	0	0	0	—	—	—	—	—	
Steve Black†	Canada	LW	1949–1951	74	7	14	21	55	13	0	0	0	13	SC: 1950
Thomas Bladon	Canada	D	1980–1981	2	0	0	0	2	—	—	—	—	—	
Mike Blaisdell	Canada	RW	1980–1983	192	44	61	105	80	—	—	—	—	—	
Mike Bloom	Canada	LW	1974–1977	134	23	28	51	131	—	—	—	—	—	
John Blum	United States	D	1988–1989	6	0	0	0	8	—	—	—	—	—	
Marc Boileau	Canada	C	1961–1962	54	5	6	11	8	—	—	—	—	—	
Patrick Boileau	Canada	D	2002–2003	25	2	6	8	14	—	—	—	—	—	
Leo Boivin	Canada	D	1965–1967	85	4	22	26	94	12	0	1	1	16	HHOF – 1986
David Booth	United States	LW	2017–2018	28	4	1	5	10	—	—	—	—	—	
Ivan Boldirev	Canada	C	1982–1985	183	67	95	162	50	6	0	6	6	4	
Dan Bolduc	United States	RW	1978–1980	100	22	18	40	33	—	—	—	—	—	
Marcel Bonin†	Canada	LW	1952–1955	107	20	29	49	67	16	0	3	3	4	SC: 1955
Darryl Bootland	Canada	RW	2003–2004; 2006–2007	28	1	1	2	83	—	—	—	—	—	
Henry Boucha	United States	C	1971–1974	159	34	26	60	116	—	—	—	—	—	
Madison Bowey	Canada	D	2018–2020	70	4	17	21	42	—	—	—	—	—	
Ralph Bowman†	Canada	D	1934–1940	197	6	13	19	145	22	2	2	4	6	SC: 1936, 1937
Richard Bowness	Canada	RW	1977–1978	61	8	11	19	76	4	0	0	0	2	
Irwin Boyd	United States	RW	1934–1935	42	2	3	5	14	—	—	—	—	—	
Michael Brandsegg-Nygård	Norway	F	2025–2026	14	0	1	1	2	—	—	—	—	—	
John Brenneman	Canada	LW	1967–1968	9	0	2	2	0	—	—	—	—	—	
Carl Brewer	Canada	D	1969–1970	70	2	37	39	51	4	0	0	0	2	
Archie Briden	Canada	LW	1926–1927	26	3	0	3	28	—	—	—	—	—	
Melvin Bridgman	Canada	C	1986–1988	70	8	13	21	61	32	9	3	12	40	
Mathias Bromé	Sweden	F	2020–2021	26	1	1	2	8	—	—	—	—	—	
Bernie Brophy	Canada	LW	1928–1930	52	4	4	8	25	2	0	0	0	2	
Doug Brown†	Canada	RW	1994–2001	427	74	97	171	108	71	16	19	35	14	SC: 1997, 1998
Adam Brown†	Canada	LW	1941–1944; 1945–1947	148	58	43	101	128	26	2	4	6	14	SC: 1943
Connie Brown†	Canada	C	1938–1943	73	15	24	39	12	14	2	3	5	0	SC: 1943
Arnie Brown	Canada	D	1970–1972	104	4	29	33	114	—	—	—	—	—	
Gerry Brown	Canada	LW	1941–1942; 1945–1946	23	4	5	9	2	12	2	1	3	4	
Larry Brown	Canada	D	1970–1971	33	1	4	5	8	—	—	—	—	—	
Stan Brown	Canada	D	1927–1928	24	2	0	2	4	—	—	—	—	—	
Jeff Brubaker	United States	LW	1988–1989	1	0	0	0	0	—	—	—	—	—	
Ed Bruneteau	Canada	RW	1940–1941; 1943–1949	180	40	42	82	35	31	7	6	13	0	
Mud Bruneteau†	Canada	RW	1935–1946	411	139	138	277	80	77	23	14	37	22	SC: 1936, 1937, 1943
Damien Brunner	Switzerland	LW	2012–2013	44	12	14	26	12	14	5	4	9	4	
Fabian Brunnstrom	Sweden	LW	2011–2012	5	0	1	1	4	—	—	—	—	—	
Bill Brydge	Canada	D	1928–1929	31	2	2	4	59	2	0	0	0	4	
Johnny Bucyk	Canada	LW	1955–1957	104	11	19	30	61	15	1	2	3	8	HHOF – 1981
Tony Bukovich	United States	LW	1943–1945	17	7	3	10	6	6	0	1	1	0	
Hy Buller	Canada	D	1943–1945	9	0	3	3	6	—	—	—	—	—	
Charlie Burns	Canada	C	1958–1959	70	9	11	20	32	—	—	—	—	—	
Shawn Burr	Canada	LW	1984–1995	659	148	214	362	765	79	16	17	33	79	
Cummy Burton	Canada	RW	1955–1956; 1957–1959	43	0	2	2	21	3	0	0	0	0	
Eddie Bush	Canada	D	1938–1939; 1941–1942	26	4	6	10	40	11	1	6	7	23	
Walt Buswell	Canada	D	1932–1935	140	4	9	13	56	13	0	1	1	6	
Yuri Butsayev	Russia	LW	1999–2002	75	6	4	10	16	—	—	—	—	—	
Dmitri Bykov	Russia	D	2002–2003	71	2	10	12	43	4	0	0	0	0	
Kyle Calder	Canada	LW	2006–2007	19	5	9	14	22	13	0	1	1	8	
Mitch Callahan	United States	RW	2013–2017	5	0	0	0	0	—	—	—	—	—	
Al Cameron	Canada	D	1975–1979	190	7	31	38	263	7	0	1	1	2	
Craig Cameron	Canada	RW	1966–1967	1	0	0	0	0	—	—	—	—	—	
Colin Campbell	Canada	D	1982–1985	178	5	16	21	306	4	0	0	0	21	
Terry Carkner	Canada	D	1993–1995	88	2	8	10	151	7	0	0	0	4	
Gene Carrigan	Canada	C	1933–1934	—	—	—	—	—	4	0	0	0	0	
Greg Carroll	Canada	C	1978–1979	36	2	9	11	8	—	—	—	—	—	
Billy Carroll	Canada	C	1985–1987	52	3	6	9	17	—	—	—	—	—	
Dwight Carruthers	Canada	D	1965–1966	1	0	0	0	0	—	—	—	—	—	
James Carson	United States	C	1989–1993	240	100	102	202	84	18	4	4	8	4	
Frank Carson	Canada	RW	1931–1934	123	32	36	68	102	12	0	2	2	7	
Joe Carveth†	Canada	RW	1940–1946; 1949–1951	325	104	132	236	45	57	19	14	33	20	SC: 1943, 1950
František Černík	Czechoslovakia	LW	1984–1985	49	5	4	9	13	—	—	—	—	—	
John Chabot	Canada	C	1987–1991	226	29	99	128	44	22	5	16	21	2	
Milan Chalupa	Czechoslovakia	D	1984–1985	14	0	5	5	6	—	—	—	—	—	
Guy Charron	Canada	C	1970–1975	265	61	78	139	57	—	—	—	—	—	
Lude Check	Canada	LW	1943–1944	1	0	0	0	0	—	—	—	—	—	
Chris Chelios†	United States	D	1998–2009	578	21	131	152	613	103	3	25	28	104	HHOF – 2013; SC: 2002, 2008
Jake Chelios	United States	D	2018–2019	5	0	0	0	2	—	—	—	—	—	
Real Chevrefils	Canada	LW	1955–1956	38	3	4	7	24	—	—	—	—	—	
Ben Chiarot	Canada	D	2022–2026	316	19	48	67	251	—	—	—	—	—	
Alex Chiasson	Canada	RW	2022–2023	20	6	3	9	6	—	—	—	—	—	
Steve Chiasson	Canada	D	1986–1994	471	67	200	267	886	46	12	14	26	108	
Dennis Cholowski	Canada	D	2018–2021	104	10	17	27	26	—	—	—	—	—	
Dino Ciccarelli	Canada	RW	1992–1996	254	107	133	240	292	47	24	8	32	78	HHOF – 2010
Chris Cichocki	United States	RW	1985–1987	61	10	11	21	23	—	—	—	—	—	
Wendel Clark	Canada	LW	1998–1999	12	4	2	6	2	10	2	3	5	10	
Daniel Cleary†	Canada	RW	2005–2015	609	124	151	275	299	111	23	26	49	66	SC: 2008
Rejean Cloutier	Canada	D	1979–1980; 1981–1982	5	0	2	2	2	—	—	—	—	—	
Roland Cloutier	Canada	C	1977–1979	20	6	6	12	2	—	—	—	—	—	
Steve Coates	Canada	RW	1976–1977	5	1	0	1	24	—	—	—	—	—	
Paul Coffey	Canada	D	1992–1996	231	46	193	239	295	49	14	36	50	50	HHOF – 2004
Carlo Colaiacovo	Canada	D	2012–2013	6	0	1	1	2	9	0	1	1	2	
Erik Cole	United States	LW	2014–2015	11	3	3	6	0	—	—	—	—	—	
Bill Collins	Canada	RW	1970–1974	239	54	77	131	129	—	—	—	—	—	
Mike Commodore	Canada	D	2011–2012	17	0	2	2	21	—	—	—	—	—	
J.T. Compher	United States	LW	2023–2026	235	41	67	108	85	—	—	—	—	—	
Brian Conacher	Canada	LW	1971–1972	22	3	1	4	4	—	—	—	—	—	
Charlie Conacher	Canada	RW	1938–1939	40	8	15	23	39	5	2	5	7	2	HHOF – 1961
Jim Conacher	Canada	C	1945–1949	117	35	41	76	16	19	5	2	7	4	
Roy Conacher	Canada	LW	1946–1947	60	30	24	54	6	5	4	4	8	2	HHOF – 1998
Wayne Connelly	Canada	C	1968–1971	146	35	58	93	22	4	1	3	4	2	
Chris Conner	United States	RW	2011–2012	8	1	2	3	0	—	—	—	—	—	
Bob Connors	Canada	LW	1928–1930	72	16	10	26	110	2	0	0	0	10	
Bob Cook	Canada	RW	1972–1973	13	3	1	4	4	—	—	—	—	—	
Carson Cooper	Canada	RW	1927–1930	222	68	48	116	81	4	0	0	0	2	
Andrew Copp	United States	C	2022–2026	296	41	100	141	83	—	—	—	—	—	
Norm Corcoran	Canada	C	1955–1956	2	0	0	0	0	—	—	—	—	—	
Murray Costello	Canada	C	1955–1957	27	0	0	0	4	4	0	0	0	0	
Gerry Couture†	Canada	RW	1944–1951	265	61	46	107	49	38	8	7	15	4	SC: 1950
Danny Cox	Canada	LW	1931–1932	47	4	6	10	23	—	—	—	—	—	
Bart Crashley	Canada	D	1965–1969; 1974–1975	109	4	29	33	34	—	—	—	—	—	
Murray Craven	Canada	LW	1982–1984	46	4	11	15	12	—	—	—	—	—	
Bob Crawford	United States	RW	1982–1983	1	0	0	0	0	—	—	—	—	—	
Jimmy Creighton	Canada	LW	1930–1931	11	1	0	1	2	—	—	—	—	—	
Kyle Criscuolo	United States	C	2021–2022	6	0	2	2	2	—	—	—	—	—	
Cory Cross	Canada	D	2005–2006	16	1	1	2	15	—	—	—	—	—	
Doug Crossman	Canada	D	1990–1992	43	3	12	15	31	6	0	5	5	6	
Gary Croteau	Canada	RW	1969–1970	10	0	2	2	2	—	—	—	—	—	
Troy Crowder	Canada	RW	1991–1992	7	0	0	0	35	1	0	0	0	0	
Ray Cullen	Canada	C	1966–1967	27	8	8	16	8	—	—	—	—	—	
Barry Cullen	Canada	RW	1959–1960	55	4	9	13	23	4	0	0	0	2	
Jim Cummins	United States	RW	1991–1993	8	1	1	2	65	—	—	—	—	—	
Ian Cushenan	Canada	D	1963–1964	5	0	0	0	4	—	—	—	—	—	
Austin Czarnik	United States	C	2022–2024	63	3	3	6	20	—	—	—	—	—	
Frank Daley	Canada	LW	1928–1929	5	0	0	0	0	2	0	0	0	0	
Trevor Daley	Canada	D	2017–2020	164	11	20	31	68	—	—	—	—	—	
Mathieu Dandenault†	Canada	RW	1995–2004	616	48	101	149	342	64	3	5	8	18	SC: 1997, 1998, 2002
Nate Danielson	Canada	C	2025–2026	28	2	5	7	4	—	—	—	—	—	
Pavel Datsyuk†	Russia	C	2001–2016	953	314	604	918	228	157	42	71	113	55	SC: 2002, 2008
Lorne Davis	Canada	RW	1954–1955	22	0	5	5	2	—	—	—	—	—	
Mal Davis	Canada	LW	1978–1979; 1980–1981	11	2	0	2	0	—	—	—	—	—	
Bob Davis	Canada	RW	1932–1933	3	0	0	0	0	—	—	—	—	—	
Billy Dea	Canada	LW	1956–1958; 1969–1971	210	35	25	60	28	9	2	1	3	4	
Don Deacon	Canada	LW	1936–1937; 1938–1940	30	6	4	10	6	2	2	1	3	0	
Nelson Debenedet	Canada	LW	1973–1974	15	4	1	5	2	—	—	—	—	—	
Alex DeBrincat	United States	RW	2023–2026	246	107	115	222	82	—	—	—	—	—	
Danny DeKeyser	United States	D	2012–2022	547	33	113	146	266	19	1	1	2	22	
Jacob de la Rose	Sweden	LW	2018–2020	76	4	9	13	20f	—	—	—	—	—	
Gilbert Delorme	Canada	D	1986–1989	121	5	14	19	165	37	0	6	6	38	
Alex Delvecchio†	Canada	C	1950–1974	1549	456	825	1281	383	121	35	69	104	29	HHOF – 1977; SC: 1952, 1954, 1955; Ret # 10
Boyd Devereaux†	Canada	C	2000–2004	256	23	40	63	74	26	3	4	7	4	SC: 2002
Al Dewsbury†	Canada	D	1946–1948; 1949–1950	34	4	3	7	14	7	0	3	3	12	SC: 1950
Edward Diachuk	Canada	LW	1960–1961	12	0	0	0	19	—	—	—	—	—	
Bob Dillabough	Canada	C	1961–1965	9	0	0	0	4	6	0	0	0	0	
Cecil Dillon	United States	RW	1939–1940	44	7	10	17	12	5	1	0	1	0	
Bill Dineen†	Canada	RW	1953–1958	282	47	35	82	114	37	1	1	2	18	SC: 1954, 1955
Peter Dineen	Canada	D	1989–1990	2	0	0	0	5	—	—	—	—	—	
Marcel Dionne	Canada	C	1971–1975	309	139	227	366	59	—	—	—	—	—	HHOF – 1992
Christian Djoos	Sweden	D	2020–2021	36	2	9	11	14	—	—	—	—	—	
Per Djoos	Sweden	D	1990–1991	26	0	12	12	16	—	—	—	—	—	
Gary Doak	Canada	D	1965–1966; 1972–1973	48	0	5	5	63	—	—	—	—	—	
Bob Dollas	Canada	D	1990–1993	89	6	6	12	42	9	1	1	2	13	
Lloyd Doran	Canada	C	1946–1947	24	3	2	5	10	—	—	—	—	—	
John Doran	Canada	D	1937–1938	7	0	0	0	10	—	—	—	—	—	
Ken Doraty	Canada	RW	1937–1938	2	0	1	1	2	—	—	—	—	—	
Kent Douglas	Canada	D	1967–1969	105	9	39	48	143	—	—	—	—	—	
Les Douglas†	Canada	C	1940–1941; 1942–1943; 1945–1947	52	6	12	18	8	10	3	2	5	2	SC: 1943
Aaron Downey†	Canada	RW	2007–2009	60	1	4	5	123	—	—	—	—	—	SC: 2008
Dallas Drake†	Canada	RW	1992–1994; 2007–2008	184	31	51	82	171	29	4	6	10	18	SC: 2008
Kris Draper†	Canada	C	1993–2011	1137	158	203	361	781	220	24	22	46	160	SC: 1997, 1998, 2002, 2008
Sheldon Dries	United States	C	2025–2026	5	0	0	0	0	—	—	—	—	—	
Rene Drolet	Canada	RW	1974–1975	1	0	0	0	0	—	—	—	—	—	
Clarence Drouillard	Canada	C	1937–1938	10	0	1	1	0	—	—	—	—	—	
Gilles Dube†	Canada	LW	1953–1954	—	—	—	—	—	2	0	0	0	0	SC: 1954
Steve Duchesne†	Canada	D	1999–2002	197	19	65	84	118	38	2	14	16	34	SC: 2002
Ron Duguay	Canada	C	1983–1986	227	90	127	217	111	7	3	3	6	9	
Lorne Duguid	Canada	LW	1934–1936	39	3	3	6	9	—	—	—	—	—	
Art Duncan	Canada	D	1926–1927	34	3	2	5	26	—	—	—	—	—	
Blake Dunlop	Canada	C	1983–1984	57	6	14	20	20	4	0	1	1	4	
Bruce Eakin	Canada	C	1985–1986	4	0	1	1	0	—	—	—	—	—	
Murray Eaves	Canada	C	1987–1990	8	0	1	1	2	—	—	—	—	—	
Patrick Eaves	Canada	RW	2009–2014	197	29	27	56	48	32	4	3	7	12	
Tim Ecclestone	Canada	LW	1970–1974	191	40	80	120	80	—	—	—	—	—	
Simon Edvinsson	Sweden	D	2022–2026	175	19	41	60	158	—	—	—	—	—	
Pat Egan	Canada	D	1943–1944	23	4	15	19	40	—	—	—	—	—	
Gerry Ehman	Canada	RW	1958–1959	6	0	1	1	4	—	—	—	—	—	
Christoffer Ehn	Sweden	C	2018–2020	114	5	8	13	8f	—	—	—	—	—	
Bo Elik	Canada	LW	1962–1963	3	0	0	0	0	—	—	—	—	—	
Matt Ellis	Canada	LW	2006–2008	51	2	4	6	18	—	—	—	—	—	
Turner Elson	Canada	LW	2021–2022	2	0	0	0	0	—	—	—	—	—	
Cory Emmerton	Canada	C	2010–2014	139	12	9	21	22	18	1	1	2	6	
Hap Emms	Canada	LW	1931–1934	108	21	29	50	141	14	0	0	0	12	
Jonathan Ericsson	Sweden	D	2007–2020	680	27	98	125	535	76	5	16	21	55	
Anders Eriksson†	Sweden	D	1995–1999	151	9	30	39	78	21	0	5	5	16	SC: 1998
Adam Erne	United States	LW	2019–2023	241	27	35	62	109	—	—	—	—	—	
Robert Errey	Canada	LW	1994–1997	137	18	34	52	124	32	1	9	10	38	
Chris Evans	Canada	D	1973–1974	23	0	2	2	2	—	—	—	—	—	
Stewart Evans	Canada	D	1930–1934	108	3	10	13	48	4	0	0	0	6	
Robby Fabbri	Canada	C	2019–2024	234	66	61	127	123	—	—	—	—	—	
Bob Falkenberg	Canada	D	1966–1969; 1970–1972	54	1	5	6	26	—	—	—	—	—	
Justin Faulk	United States	D	2025–2026	17	5	3	8	10	—	—	—	—	—	
Alex Faulkner	Canada	C	1962–1964	100	15	17	32	15	12	5	0	5	2	
Bernie Federko	Canada	C	1989–1990	73	17	40	57	24	—	—	—	—	—	HHOF – 2002
Sergei Fedorov†	Soviet Union; Russia	C	1990–2003	908	400	554	954	587	162	50	113	163	113	HHOF – 2015; SC: 1997, 1998, 2002
Brent Fedyk	Canada	LW	1987–1992	162	24	32	56	88	7	1	0	1	4	
Lorne Ferguson	Canada	LW	1955–1958	116	22	20	42	38	15	2	2	4	18	
Mark Ferner	Canada	D	1994–1995	3	0	0	0	0	—	—	—	—	—	
Landon Ferraro	Canada	C	2013–2016	7	1	0	1	9	7	0	0	0	2	
Viacheslav Fetisov†	Russia	D	1994–1998	205	17	81	98	246	78	1	19	20	100	HHOF – 2001; SC: 1997, 1998
Guyle Fielder	United States	C	1952–1953; 1957–1958	6	0	0	0	2	4	0	0	0	0	
Tommy Filmore	Canada	RW	1930–1932	48	6	2	8	12	—	—	—	—	—	
Valtteri Filppula†	Finland	C	2005–2013; 2019–2021	591	112	175	287	194	105	19	38	57	30	SC: 2008
Emmitt Finnie	Canada	C	2025–2026	82	13	17	30	6	—	—	—	—	—	
Christian Fischer	United States	RW	2023–2025	124	6	20	26	47	—	—	—	—	—	
Jiří Fischer†	Czech Republic	D	1999–2006	305	11	49	60	295	38	4	3	7	55	SC: 2002
Joe Fisher†	Canada	RW	1939–1943	65	8	12	20	13	12	2	1	3	6	SC: 1943
Dunc Fisher	Canada	RW	1958–1959	8	0	0	0	0	—	—	—	—	—	
Lee Fogolin†	United States	D	1947–1951	125	5	11	16	138	21	0	1	1	26	SC: 1950
Rick Foley	Canada	D	1973–1974	7	0	0	0	4	—	—	—	—	—	
Michael Foligno	Canada	RW	1979–1982	186	77	83	160	347	—	—	—	—	—	
Bill Folk	Canada	D	1951–1953	12	0	0	0	4	—	—	—	—	—	
Len Fontaine	Canada	RW	1972–1974	46	8	11	19	10	—	—	—	—	—	
Val Fonteyne	Canada	LW	1959–1963; 1964–1967	375	29	53	82	16	45	3	8	11	6	
Dwight Foster	Canada	RW	1982–1986	215	48	62	110	212	6	0	1	1	0	
Yip Foster	Canada	D	1933–1935	18	2	0	2	10	—	—	—	—	—	
Frank Foyston	Canada	C	1926–1927	64	7	17	24	32	—	—	—	—	—	HHOF – 1958
Bob Francis	Canada	C	1982–1983	14	2	0	2	0	—	—	—	—	—	
Johan Franzén†	Sweden	C	2005–2016	602	187	183	370	401	107	42	39	81	80	SC: 2008
Gord Fraser	Canada	D	1926–1929	44	3	1	4	62	—	—	—	—	—	
Tim Friday	Canada	D	1985–1986	23	0	3	3	6	—	—	—	—	—	
Frank Fredrickson	Canada	C	1926–1927	40	5	8	13	18	—	—	—	—	—	HHOF – 1958
Martin Frk	Czech Republic	RW	2017–2019	98	12	19	31	18	—	—	—	—	—	
Miroslav Fryčer	Czechoslovakia	C	1988–1989	23	7	8	15	47	—	—	—	—	—	
Robert Ftorek	United States	C	1972–1974	15	2	5	7	4	—	—	—	—	—	
Bill Gadsby	Canada	D	1961–1966	323	18	94	112	478	44	2	14	16	78	HHOF – 1970
Jody Gage	Canada	RW	1980–1982; 1983–1984	50	11	12	23	24	—	—	—	—	—	
Art Gagne	Canada	RW	1931–1932	13	1	1	2	0	—	—	—	—	—	
Sam Gagner	Canada	C	2019–2022	129	21	26	47	49	—	—	—	—	—	
John Gallagher†	Canada	D	1932–1934; 1936–1937	47	4	6	10	52	14	2	1	3	21	SC: 1937
Gerard Gallant	Canada	LW	1984–1993	563	207	260	467	1600	58	18	21	39	178	
Danny Gare	Canada	RW	1981–1986	306	86	95	181	593	6	2	0	2	48	
Johan Garpenlöv	Sweden	LW	1990–1992	87	19	23	42	22	6	0	1	1	4	
Fern Gauthier	Canada	RW	1945–1949	146	14	27	41	12	18	5	1	6	7	
George Gee†	United States	C	1948–1951	186	41	53	94	88	30	4	10	14	22	SC: 1950
Gus Giesebrecht	Canada	C	1938–1942	135	27	51	78	13	17	2	3	5	0	
Brent Gilchrist†	Canada	LW	1997–2002	169	20	25	45	113	29	2	2	4	18	SC: 1998
Todd Gill	Canada	D	1998–2001	104	7	10	17	79	16	0	2	2	12	
Farrand Gillie	Canada	LW	1928–1929	1	0	0	0	0	—	—	—	—	—	
Art Giroux	Canada	RW	1935–1936	4	0	2	2	0	—	—	—	—	—	
Larry Giroux	Canada	D	1974–1978	56	3	24	27	91	2	0	0	0	2	
Luke Glendening	United States	C	2013–2021	554	57	69	126	194	17	3	2	5	8	
Larry Gloekner	Canada	D	1978–1979	13	0	2	2	6	—	—	—	—	—	
Howie Glover	Canada	RW	1960–1962	105	28	16	44	90	11	1	2	3	2	
Fred Glover	Canada	C	1948–1952	61	9	9	18	25	8	0	0	0	0	
Warren Godfrey	Canada	D	1955–1962; 1963–1968	528	23	77	100	527	34	1	3	4	36	
Pete Goegan	Canada	D	1957–1967	330	18	63	81	329	33	1	3	4	61	
Bob Goldham†	Canada	D	1950–1956	406	11	92	103	183	53	1	12	13	22	SC: 1952, 1954, 1955
Leroy Goldsworthy	United States	RW	1930–1933	37	4	6	10	8	2	0	0	0	0	
Cody Goloubef	Canada	D	2019–2020	2	0	0	0	0	—	—	—	—	—	
Yan Golubovsky	Russia	D	1997–2000	50	1	5	6	30	—	—	—	—	—	
Ebbie Goodfellow†	Canada	C	1929–1943	557	134	190	324	511	45	8	8	16	65	HHOF – 1963; SC: 1936, 1937, 1943
Fred Gordon	Canada	RW	1926–1927	38	5	5	10	28	—	—	—	—	—	
Shayne Gostisbehere	United States	D	2023–2024	81	10	46	56	16	—	—	—	—	—	
Ted Graham	Canada	D	1933–1935	52	1	2	3	55	9	3	1	4	8	
Danny Grant	Canada	LW	1974–1978	174	64	62	126	58	—	—	—	—	—	
Leo Gravelle	Canada	RW	1950–1951	18	1	2	3	6	—	—	—	—	—	
Adam Graves	Canada	LW	1987–1990	78	7	7	14	81	5	0	0	0	4	
Mike Green	Canada	D	2015–2020	303	37	104	141	176	5	1	1	2	10	
Red Green	Canada	LW	1928–1929	2	0	0	0	0	—	—	—	—	—	
Rick Green	Canada	D	1990–1991	65	2	14	16	24	3	0	0	0	0	
Stu Grimson	Canada	LW	1994–1997	68	0	1	1	165	13	1	0	1	26	
Lloyd Gross	Canada	LW	1933–1935	19	2	1	3	4	1	0	0	0	0	
Don Grosso†	Canada	LW	1938–1945	235	71	99	170	67	44	15	14	29	46	SC: 1943
Danny Gruen	Canada	LW	1972–1974	20	1	3	4	7	—	—	—	—	—	
Bep Guidolin	Canada	LW	1947–1949	62	12	10	22	78	2	0	0	0	4	
Erik Gustafsson	Sweden	D	2024–2026	62	2	16	18	22	—	—	—	—	—	
Marc Habscheid	Canada	C	1989–1991	112	24	19	43	55	5	0	0	0	0	
Lloyd Haddon	Canada	D	1959–1960	8	0	0	0	2	1	0	0	0	0	
Robert Hagg	Sweden	D	2022–2023	38	2	5	7	26	—	—	—	—	—	
Gord Haidy†	Canada	RW	1949–1950	—	—	—	—	—	1	0	0	0	0	SC: 1950
Haldor Halderson	Canada	D	1926–1927	19	2	0	2	29	—	—	—	—	—	
Len Haley	Canada	RW	1959–1961	30	2	2	4	14	6	1	3	4	6	
Bob Halkidis	Canada	D	1993–1995	32	1	5	6	99	1	0	0	0	2	
Murray Hall	Canada	RW	1964–1967	13	4	3	7	4	2	0	0	0	0	
Doug Halward	Canada	D	1986–1989	99	5	25	30	185	8	1	4	5	18	
Jean Hamel	Canada	D	1973–1981	451	19	62	81	574	7	0	0	0	10	
Travis Hamonic	Canada	D	2025–2026	26	0	2	2	29	—	—	—	—	—	
Edward Hampson	Canada	C	1963–1968	110	22	54	76	14	—	—	—	—	—	
David Hanson	United States	D	1978–1979	11	0	0	0	26	—	—	—	—	—	
Emil Hanson	Canada	RW	1932–1933	7	0	0	0	6	—	—	—	—	—	
Terrance Harper	Canada	D	1975–1979	252	14	56	70	230	7	0	1	1	4	
Ron Harris	Canada	D	1962–1972	252	8	51	59	342	4	0	0	0	8	
Ted Harris	Canada	D	1973–1974	41	0	11	11	66	—	—	—	—	—	
Billy Harris	Canada	C	1965–1966	24	1	4	5	6	—	—	—	—	—	
Gerry Hart	Canada	D	1968–1972	71	2	7	9	152	—	—	—	—	—	
Gizzy Hart	Canada	LW	1926–1927	2	0	0	0	0	—	—	—	—	—	
Mark Hartigan†	Canada	C	2007–2008	23	3	1	4	16	4	0	1	1	4	SC: 2008
Buster Harvey	Canada	RW	1975–1977	89	19	20	39	43	—	—	—	—	—	
Doug Harvey	Canada	D	1966–1967	2	0	0	0	0	—	—	—	—	—	HHOF – 1973
Derian Hatcher	United States	D	2003–2004	15	0	4	4	8	12	0	1	1	15	
Ed Hatoum	Canada	RW	1968–1970	21	2	3	5	4	—	—	—	—	—	
George Hay	Canada	LW	1927–1934	204	60	52	112	72	6	0	2	2	0	HHOF – 1958
Jim Hay†	Canada	D	1952–1955	75	1	5	6	22	9	1	0	1	2	SC: 1955
Galen Head	Canada	RW	1967–1968	1	0	0	0	0	—	—	—	—	—	
Rich Healey	Canada	D	1960–1961	1	0	0	0	2	—	—	—	—	—	
Darren Helm†	Canada	C	2007–2021	744	112	139	251	238	82	11	10	21	28	SC: 2008
Paul Henderson	Canada	LW	1962–1968	269	67	79	146	132	33	5	8	13	16	
Jack Hendrickson	Canada	D	1957–1962	5	0	0	0	4	—	—	—	—	—	
Jimmy Herbert	Canada	C	1928–1930	63	10	8	18	38	1	0	0	0	2	
Art Herchenratter	Canada	LW	1940–1941	10	1	2	3	2	—	—	—	—	—	
Dennis Hextall	Canada	C	1975–1979	193	39	82	121	457	7	1	1	2	10	
Bryan Hextall	Canada	C	1975–1976	21	0	4	4	29	—	—	—	—	—	
Joe Hicketts	Canada	D	2017–2020	22	0	5	5	4	—	—	—	—	—	
Glenn Hicks	Canada	LW	1979–1981	108	6	12	18	127	—	—	—	—	—	
Hal Hicks	Canada	D	1929–1930	52	5	2	7	45	—	—	—	—	—	
Tim Higgins	Canada	RW	1986–1989	181	29	36	65	280	26	1	1	2	42	
Jim Hiller	Canada	RW	1992–1993	21	2	6	8	19	2	0	0	0	4	
Dutch Hiller	Canada	LW	1941–1942	7	0	0	0	0	—	—	—	—	—	
Larry Hillman†	Canada	D	1954–1957	69	1	5	6	59	13	0	1	1	6	SC: 1955
John Hilworth	Canada	D	1977–1980	57	1	1	2	89	—	—	—	—	—	
Taro Hirose	Canada	LW	2018–2023	60	4	16	20	14	—	—	—	—	—	
Bill Hogaboam	Canada	C	1972–1980	221	61	84	145	74	—	—	—	—	—	
Justin Holl	United States	D	2023–2025	111	2	11	13	38	—	—	—	—	—	
Flash Hollett	Canada	D	1943–1946	115	30	42	72	89	24	3	6	9	12	
Gord Hollingworth	Canada	D	1955–1958	93	1	5	6	66	3	0	0	0	2	
Chuck Holmes	Canada	RW	1958–1962	23	1	3	4	10	—	—	—	—	—	
Tomas Holmström†	Sweden	LW	1996–2012	1026	243	287	530	769	180	46	51	97	162	SC: 1997, 1998, 2002, 2008
John Holota†	Canada	C	1942–1946	15	2	0	2	0	—	—	—	—	—	SC: 1943
Pete Horeck	Canada	LW	1946–1949	148	38	46	84	149	26	6	8	14	28	
Marián Hossa	Slovakia	RW	2008–2009	74	40	31	71	63	22	6	9	15	10	
Doug Houda	Canada	D	1985–1999	172	5	26	31	251	6	0	1	1	0	
Gordie Howe†	Canada	RW	1946–1971	1687	786	1023	1809	1643	154	67	91	158	218	HHOF – 1972; SC: 1950, 1952, 1954, 1955; Ret # 9
Mark Howe	United States	D	1992–1995	122	8	56	64	40	16	1	4	5	2	HHOF – 2011
Syd Howe†	Canada	C	1934–1946	513	188	247	435	134	68	17	27	44	10	HHOF – 1965; SC: 1936, 1937, 1943
Filip Hronek	Czech Republic	D	2018–2023	305	30	126	156	162	—	—	—	—	—	
Steve Hrymnak	Canada	D	1952–1953	—	—	—	—	—	2	0	0	0	0	
Wilhelm Huber	Canada	D	1978–1983	372	68	140	208	612	—	—	—	—	—	
Jiří Hudler†	Czech Republic	C	2003–2009; 2010–2012	409	87	127	214	160	66	12	21	33	34	SC: 2008
Ron Hudson	Canada	C	1937–1940	33	5	2	7	2	—	—	—	—	—	
Brent Hughes	Canada	D	1973–1974	69	1	21	22	92	—	—	—	—	—	
James Hughes	Canada	D	1929–1930	40	0	1	1	48	—	—	—	—	—	
Brett Hull†	United States	RW	2001–2004	245	92	115	207	69	39	13	11	24	8	HHOF – 2009; SC: 2002
Dennis Hull	Canada	LW	1977–1978	55	5	9	14	6	7	0	0	0	2	
Kent Huskins	Canada	D	2012–2013	11	0	0	0	4	—	—	—	—	—	
Matt Hussey	United States	C	2006–2007	5	0	0	0	2	—	—	—	—	—	
Miroslav Ihnačák	Czechoslovakia	LW	1988–1989	1	0	0	0	0	—	—	—	—	—	
Earl Ingarfield, Jr.	United States	C	1980–1981	22	2	1	3	16	—	—	—	—	—	
Ron Ingram	Canada	D	1963–1964	50	3	6	9	50	—	—	—	—	—	
Harold Jackson†	Canada	D	1940–1947	178	16	31	47	202	30	1	2	3	31	SC: 1943
Doug Janik	United States	D	2009–2012	29	0	3	3	31	—	—	—	—	—	
Lou Jankowski	Canada	C	1950–1953	23	1	3	4	0	1	0	0	0	0	
Gary Jarrett	Canada	LW	1966–1968	72	18	21	39	20	—	—	—	—	—	
Pierre Jarry	Canada	LW	1973–1975	91	23	36	59	21	—	—	—	—	—	
Larry Jeffrey	Canada	LW	1961–1965	170	24	34	58	217	25	4	9	13	36	
Bill Jennings	Canada	RW	1940–1944	69	12	20	32	20	13	2	2	4	0	
Nick Jensen	United States	D	2016–2019	190	6	37	43	56	—	—	—	—	—	
Albert Johansson	Sweden	D	2024–2026	143	6	14	20	46	—	—	—	—	—	
Greg Johnson	Canada	C	1993–1997	177	33	48	81	78	21	5	3	8	10	
Al Johnson	Canada	RW	1960–1963	103	21	27	48	28	11	2	2	4	6	
Dan Johnson	Canada	C	1971–1972	43	2	5	7	8	—	—	—	—	—	
Brian Johnson	Canada	RW	1983–1984	3	0	0	0	5	—	—	—	—	—	
Earl Johnson†	Canada	LW	1953–1954	1	0	0	0	0	—	—	—	—	—	SC: 1954
Larry Johnston	Canada	D	1971–1974	203	7	44	51	419	—	—	—	—	—	
Ed Johnstone	Canada	RW	1983–1987	55	13	11	24	56	2	0	0	0	0	
Greg Joly	Canada	D	1976–1983	267	12	52	64	178	5	0	0	0	8	
Buck Jones	Canada	D	1938–1942	34	2	2	4	14	6	0	1	1	10	
Eddie Joyal	Canada	C	1962–1965	107	20	29	49	10	32	4	4	8	16	
Olli Juolevi	Finland	D	2021–2022	8	0	0	0	4	—	—	—	—	—	
Tomáš Jurčo	Slovakia	RW	2013–2017	159	15	24	39	46	10	1	1	2	2	
Francis Kane	Canada	D	1943–1944	2	0	0	0	0	—	—	—	—	—	
Patrick Kane	United States	RW	2023–2026	189	57	106	163	44	—	—	—	—	—	
Al Karlander	Canada	C	1969–1973	212	36	56	92	70	4	0	1	1	0	
Marco Kasper	Austria	C	2022–2026	159	28	28	56	67	—	—	—	—	—	
Jack Keating	Canada	LW	1938–1940	11	3	0	3	4	—	—	—	—	—	
Duke Keats	Canada	D	1926–1928	30	12	3	15	38	—	—	—	—	—	HHOF – 1958
Red Kelly†	Canada	D	1947–1960	846	162	310	472	253	94	16	21	37	35	HHOF – 1969; SC: 1950, 1952, 1954, 1955
Pete Kelly†	Canada	RW	1935–1939	134	15	22	37	48	19	3	1	4	2	SC: 1936, 1937
Dave Kelly	Canada	RW	1976–1977	16	2	0	2	4	—	—	—	—	—	
Sheldon Kennedy	Canada	RW	1989–1994	183	31	33	64	122	14	2	3	5	2	
Forbes Kennedy	Canada	C	1957–1962	168	14	22	36	300	4	1	0	1	12	
Alan Kerr	Canada	RW	1991–1992	58	3	8	11	133	9	2	0	2	17	
Hec Kilrea†	Canada	LW	1931–1940	251	42	47	89	103	25	4	6	10	4	SC: 1936, 1937
Ken Kilrea	Canada	LW	1938–1944	91	16	23	39	8	15	2	2	4	4	
Wally Kilrea†	Canada	RW	1934–1938	103	12	23	35	20	17	2	4	6	6	SC: 1936, 1937
Brian Kilrea	Canada	C	1957–1958	1	0	0	0	0	—	—	—	—	—	
Jakub Kindl	Czech Republic	D	2009–2016	273	16	52	68	149	19	1	4	5	12	
Kris King	Canada	LW	1987–1989	58	3	3	6	170	2	0	0	0	2	
Mark Kirton	Canada	C	1980–1983	134	33	42	75	92	—	—	—	—	—	
Kelly Kisio	Canada	C	1982–1986	236	68	129	197	175	7	1	2	3	6	
Hobie Kitchen	Canada	D	1926–1927	17	0	2	2	42	—	—	—	—	—	
Petr Klíma	Czechoslovakia; Czech Republic	RW	1985–1999	306	130	93	223	158	31	13	14	27	33	
Mike Knuble†	Canada	RW	1996–1998	62	8	6	14	16	3	0	1	1	0	SC: 1998
Joe Kocur†	Canada	RW	1984–1999	535	66	66	132	1963	69	8	8	16	147	SC: 1997, 1998
Ladislav Kohn	Czech Republic	RW	2001–2002	4	0	0	0	4	—	—	—	—	—	
Steve Konroyd	Canada	D	1992–1994	25	0	1	1	14	1	0	0	0	0	
Vladimir Konstantinov†	Soviet Union; Russia	D	1991–1997	446	47	128	175	838	82	5	14	19	107	SC: 1997
Tomáš Kopecký†	Slovakia	RW	2005–2009	183	12	20	32	113	12	0	1	1	13	SC: 2008
Jim Korn	United States	D	1979–1982	185	11	35	46	458	—	—	—	—	—	
Mike Korney	Canada	D	1973–1976	59	9	9	18	41	—	—	—	—	—	
Klim Kostin	Russia	C/LW	2023–2024	33	3	1	4	38	—	—	—	—	—	
Christopher Kotsopoulos	Canada	D	1989–1990	2	0	0	0	10	—	—	—	—	—	
Vyacheslav Kozlov†	Soviet Union; Russia	LW	1991–2001	607	202	213	415	376	114	42	37	79	76	SC: 1997, 1998
Dale Krentz	Canada	LW	1986–1989	30	5	3	8	9	2	0	0	0	0	
Niklas Kronwall†	Sweden	D	2003–2019	953	83	349	432	564	109	5	42	47	89	SC: 2008
Jim Krulicki	Canada	LW	1970–1971	14	0	1	1	0	—	—	—	—	—	
Uwe Krupp	Germany	D	1998–2002	30	3	3	6	14	2	0	0	0	2	
Gordon Kruppke	Canada	D	1990–1994	23	0	0	0	32	—	—	—	—	—	
Mike Krushelnyski	Canada	C	1994–1995	20	2	3	5	6	8	0	0	0	0	
Dave Kryskow	Canada	LW	1974–1975	18	1	4	5	4	—	—	—	—	—	
Dominik Kubalík	Czech Republic	LW	2022–2023	81	20	25	45	24	—	—	—	—	—	
Ryan Kuffner	Canada	LW	2018–2019	10	0	0	0	0	—	—	—	—	—	
Mark Kumpel	United States	RW	1986–1988	18	0	3	3	4	8	0	0	0	4	
Maxim Kuznetsov	Russia	D	2000–2003	117	2	7	9	117	—	—	—	—	—	
Leo Labine	Canada	RW	1960–1962	72	5	13	18	62	11	3	2	5	4	
Dan Labraaten	Sweden	LW	1978–1981	198	52	54	106	28	—	—	—	—	—	
Randy Ladouceur	Canada	D	1982–1987	290	14	67	81	448	7	2	0	2	6	
Claude LaForge	Canada	LW	1958–1965	123	15	17	32	46	—	—	—	—	—	
Roger Lafreniere	Canada	LW	1962–1963	3	0	0	0	4	—	—	—	—	—	
William Lagesson	Sweden	D	2024–2025	7	0	1	1	4	—	—	—	—	—	
Serge Lajeunesse	Canada	D	1970–1973	97	1	4	5	101	—	—	—	—	—	
Hec Lalande	Canada	C	1957–1958	12	0	2	2	2	—	—	—	—	—	
Joe Lamb	Canada	RW	1937–1938	14	3	1	4	6	—	—	—	—	—	
Mark Lamb	Canada	C	1986–1987	22	2	1	3	8	11	0	0	0	11	
Lane Lambert	Canada	RW	1983–1986	176	36	29	65	349	4	0	0	0	10	
Robert Lang	Czech Republic	C	2003–2007	159	40	79	119	138	36	9	14	23	16	
Josh Langfeld	United States	RW	2006–2007	33	0	2	2	12	—	—	—	—	—	
Albert Langlois	Canada	D	1963–1965	82	2	18	20	120	20	1	0	1	16	
Darryl Laplante	Canada	C	1997–2000	35	0	6	6	10	—	—	—	—	—	
Martin Lapointe†	Canada	RW	1991–2001	552	108	122	230	888	86	17	22	39	158	SC: 1997, 1998
Rick Lapointe	Canada	D	1975–1977	129	12	34	46	175	—	—	—	—	—	
Igor Larionov†	Russia	C	1995–2003	539	89	308	397	302	105	20	39	59	38	HHOF – 2008; SC: 1997, 1998, 2002
Dylan Larkin	United States	C	2015–2026	808	276	367	643	499	5	1	0	1	18	
Reed Larson	United States	D	1976–1986	708	188	382	570	1127	14	3	4	7	45	
Brian Lashoff	United States	D	2012–2020	136	2	13	15	65	8	0	0	0	0	
Brian Lavender	Canada	LW	1972–1974	30	2	2	4	25	—	—	—	—	—	
Daniel Lawson	Canada	RW	1967–1969	45	5	7	12	21	—	—	—	—	—	
Reggie Leach	Canada	RW	1982–1983	78	15	17	32	13	—	—	—	—	—	
James Leavins	Canada	D	1985–1986	37	2	11	13	26	—	—	—	—	—	
Brett Lebda†	United States	D	2005–2010	326	18	50	68	201	62	0	10	10	40	SC: 2008
Jean-Paul Leblanc	Canada	C	1975–1979	147	13	28	41	87	2	0	0	0	0	
Fern LeBlanc	Canada	C	1976–1979	34	5	6	11	0	—	—	—	—	—	
Rene LeClerc	Canada	RW	1968–1971	87	10	11	21	105	—	—	—	—	—	
Nick Leddy	United States	D	2021–2022	55	1	15	16	16	—	—	—	—	—	
David Legwand	United States	C	2013–2014	21	4	7	11	31	5	0	0	0	0	
Ville Leino	Finland	LW	2008–2010	55	9	7	16	12	7	0	2	2	0	
Real Lemieux	Canada	LW	1966–1967	1	0	0	0	0	—	—	—	—	—	
John Leonard	United States	C	2025–2026	11	2	2	4	0	—	—	—	—	—	
Tony Leswick†	Canada	LW	1951–1958	302	41	59	100	409	41	8	4	12	71	SC: 1952, 1954, 1955
Herbie Lewis†	Canada	LW	1928–1939	483	148	161	309	248	38	13	10	23	6	HHOF – 1989; SC: 1936, 1937
Dave Lewis	Canada	D	1986–1988	64	2	5	7	84	14	0	4	4	10	
Nick Libett	Canada	LW	1967–1979	861	217	250	467	454	11	5	1	6	2	
Tony Licari	Canada	RW	1946–1947	9	0	1	1	0	—	—	—	—	—	
Nicklas Lidström†	Sweden	D	1991–2012	1564	264	878	1142	514	263	54	129	183	76	HHOF – 2015; SC: 1997, 1998, 2002, 2008; Ret # 5
Andreas Lilja†	Sweden	D	2005–2010	298	7	40	47	315	47	1	2	3	46	SC: 2008
Ted Lindsay†	Canada	LW	1944–1965	862	335	393	728	1423	123	44	44	88	181	HHOF – 1966; SC: 1950, 1952, 1954, 1955; Ret # 7
Gustav Lindström	Sweden	D	2019–2023	128	2	23	25	56	—	—	—	—	—	
Carl Liscombe†	Canada	LW	1937–1946	373	137	140	277	117	59	22	19	41	20	SC: 1943
Ed Litzenberger	Canada	C	1961–1962	32	8	12	20	4	—	—	—	—	—	
Bill Lochead	Canada	LW	1974–1979	296	65	60	125	162	7	3	0	3	6	
Mark Lofthouse	Canada	RW	1981–1983	40	11	8	19	31	—	—	—	—	—	
Claude Loiselle	Canada	C	1981–1986	128	22	22	44	236	3	0	2	2	0	
Barry Long	Canada	D	1979–1980	80	0	17	17	38	—	—	—	—	—	
Matt Lorito	Canada	RW	2016–2017	2	0	1	1	0	—	—	—	—	—	
Clem Loughlin	Canada	D	1926–1928	77	8	5	13	61	—	—	—	—	—	
Dave Lucas	Canada	D	1962–1963	1	0	0	0	0	—	—	—	—	—	
Don Luce	Canada	C	1970–1971	58	3	11	14	18	—	—	—	—	—	
Matt Luff	Canada	RW	2022–2023	19	2	2	4	0	—	—	—	—	—	
Len Lunde	Canada	C	1958–1962	210	28	50	78	39	16	3	2	5	0	
Tord Lundström	Sweden	LW	1973–1974	11	1	1	2	0	—	—	—	—	—	
Pat Lundy	Canada	C	1945–1949	89	28	23	51	22	16	2	2	4	2	
Chris Luongo	United States	D	1990–1991	4	0	1	1	4	—	—	—	—	—	
George Lyle	Canada	LW	1979–1982	69	18	20	38	34	—	—	—	—	—	
Jack Lynch	Canada	D	1973–1975	85	5	24	29	73	—	—	—	—	—	
Vic Lynn	Canada	LW	1943–1944	3	0	0	0	4	—	—	—	—	—	
Olli Mäattä	Finland	D	2022–2025	157	10	31	41	28	—	—	—	—	—	
Parker MacDonald	Canada	C	1960–1967	361	94	122	216	135	50	8	6	14	12	
Lowell MacDonald	Canada	LW	1961–1965	46	5	6	11	10	1	0	0	0	2	
Bruce MacGregor	Canada	C	1960–1971	673	151	184	335	173	55	9	14	23	34	
Calum MacKay	Canada	LW	1946–1949	6	0	0	0	0	—	—	—	—	—	
Howard Mackie†	Canada	RW	1936–1938	20	1	0	1	4	8	0	0	0	0	SC: 1937
Paul MacLean	Canada	RW	1988–1989	76	36	35	71	118	5	1	1	2	8	
Donald MacLean	Canada	C	2005–2006	3	1	1	2	0	—	—	—	—	—	
Rick MacLeish	Canada	C	1983–1984	25	2	8	10	4	1	0	0	0	0	
Brian MacLellan	Canada	LW	1991–1992	23	1	5	6	38	—	—	—	—	—	
John MacMillan	Canada	RW	1963–1965	23	0	4	4	6	4	0	1	1	2	
James Macoun	Canada	D	1997–1999	76	1	10	11	38	23	2	2	4	18	
Frank Mahovlich	Canada	LW	1967–1971	198	108	88	196	129	4	0	0	0	2	HHOF – 1981
Peter Mahovlich	Canada	C	1965–1981	186	26	64	90	145	—	—	—	—	—	
Mark Major	Canada	LW	1996–1997	2	0	0	0	5	—	—	—	—	—	
Dan Maloney	Canada	LW	1975–1978	177	56	81	137	418	—	—	—	—	—	
Steve Maltais	Canada	LW	1993–1994	4	0	1	1	0	—	—	—	—	—	
Kirk Maltby†	Canada	LW	1995–2010	908	107	115	222	683	169	16	15	31	149	SC: 1997, 1998, 2002, 2008
Randy Manery	Canada	D	1970–1972	3	0	0	0	0	—	—	—	—	—	
Ken Mann	Canada	RW	1975–1976	1	0	0	0	0	—	—	—	—	—	
Bob Manno	Canada	D	1983–1985	136	19	35	54	92	7	1	3	4	0	
Anthony Mantha	Canada	RW	2015–2021	302	95	99	194	188	—	—	—	—	—	
Alexei Marchenko	Russia	D	2013–2017	110	3	16	19	26	6	0	0	0	10	
Lou Marcon	Canada	D	1958–1963	60	0	4	4	42	—	—	—	—	—	
Gus Marker	Canada	RW	1932–1934	20	2	1	3	10	4	0	0	0	2	
Danny Markov	Russia	D	2006–2007	66	4	12	16	59	18	0	0	0	13	
Brad Marsh	Canada	D	1990–1992	75	4	7	11	69	4	0	0	0	0	
Gary Marsh	Canada	LW	1967–1968	6	1	3	4	4	—	—	—	—	—	
Albert Marshall	Canada	D	1965–1968	155	1	34	35	169	12	1	3	4	16	
Pit Martin	Canada	C	1961–1966	119	18	23	41	60	17	1	5	6	16	
Clare Martin†	Canada	D	1949–1951	114	3	11	14	26	12	0	1	1	0	SC: 1950
Don Martineau	Canada	RW	1975–1977	10	0	1	1	0	—	—	—	—	—	
Steve Martinson	United States	LW	1987–1988	10	1	1	2	84	—	—	—	—	—	
Joe Matte	Canada	D	1929–1930	12	0	1	1	0	—	—	—	—	—	
Charley Mason	Canada	RW	1938–1939	6	0	1	1	0	—	—	—	—	—	
Brad May	Canada	LW	2009–2010	40	0	1	1	66	—	—	—	—	—	
Carter Mazur	United States	LW	2024–2026	9	0	0	0	0	—	—	—	—	—	
Gary McAdam	Canada	RW	1980–1981	40	5	14	19	27	—	—	—	—	—	
Jud McAtee	Canada	LW	1942–1945	46	15	13	28	6	14	2	1	3	0	
Stan McCabe	Canada	LW	1929–1930	69	9	4	13	45	—	—	—	—	—	
Doug McCaig	Canada	D	1941–1949	92	5	9	14	117	7	0	1	1	10	
Rick McCann	Canada	C	1967–1975	43	1	4	5	6	—	—	—	—	—	
Tom McCarthy	Canada	LW	1956–1959	36	4	4	8	8	—	—	—	—	—	
Darren McCarty†	Canada	RW	1993–2009	758	127	161	287	1477	174	23	26	49	228	SC: 1997, 1998, 2002, 2008
Bert McInenly	Canada	LW	1930–1932	61	3	6	9	64	—	—	—	—	—	
Kevin McClelland	Canada	RW	1989–1991	64	4	5	9	190	—	—	—	—	—	
Bob McCord	Canada	D	1965–1968	26	1	4	5	45	—	—	—	—	—	
Dale McCourt	Canada	C	1977–1982	341	134	203	337	92	7	4	2	6	2	
Bill McCreary, Sr.	Canada	LW	1957–1958	3	1	0	1	2	—	—	—	—	—	
Brad McCrimmon	Canada	D	1990–1993	203	8	49	57	270	18	1	2	3	29	
Brian McCutcheon	Canada	LW	1974–1977	37	3	1	4	7	—	—	—	—	—	
Wilfred McDonald†	Canada	D	1934–1939	170	11	20	31	76	17	3	0	3	12	SC: 1936, 1937
Ab McDonald	Canada	LW	1965–1972	74	10	19	29	8	10	1	4	5	2	
Butch McDonald	Canada	LW	1939–1945	40	2	7	9	2	5	0	2	2	10	
Al McDonough	Canada	RW	1977–1978	13	2	2	4	4	—	—	—	—	—	
Bill McDougall	Canada	C	1990–1991	2	0	1	1	0	1	0	0	0	0	
Mike McEwen	Canada	D	1985–1986	29	0	10	10	16	—	—	—	—	—	
Jim McFadden†	Canada	C	1946–1951	253	64	78	142	40	42	7	9	16	26	SC: 1950
Bob McGill	Canada	D	1991–1992	12	0	0	0	21	8	0	0	0	14	
Dylan McIlrath	Canada	D	2018–2020	23	0	0	0	27	—	—	—	—	—	
Jack McIntyre	Canada	D	1957–1960	145	38	28	66	24	10	2	2	4	0	
Randy McKay	Canada	RW	1988–1991	83	4	13	17	234	7	0	1	1	43	
Doug McKay†	Canada	LW	1949–1950	—	—	—	—	—	1	0	0	0	0	SC: 1950
Walt McKechnie	Canada	C	1974–1983	321	89	167	256	218	—	—	—	—	—	
Tony McKegney	Canada	LW	1989–1990	14	2	1	3	8	—	—	—	—	—	
Don McKenney	Canada	C	1965–1966	24	1	6	7	0	—	—	—	—	—	
John McKenzie	Canada	RW	1959–1961	75	11	13	24	63	2	0	0	0	0	
Andrew McKim	Canada	C	1994–1995	2	0	0	0	2	—	—	—	—	—	
Rollie McLenahan	Canada	D	1945–1946	9	2	1	3	10	2	0	0	0	0	
Al McLeod	Canada	D	1973–1974	26	2	2	4	24	—	—	—	—	—	
Mike McMahon Jr.	Canada	D	1969–1970	2	0	0	0	0	—	—	—	—	—	
Max McNab†	Canada	C	1947–1951	128	16	19	35	24	25	1	0	1	4	SC: 1950
Billy McNeill	Canada	RW	1956–1964	257	21	46	67	142	4	1	1	2	4	
Stu McNeill	Canada	C	1957–1960	10	1	1	2	2	—	—	—	—	—	
Basil McRae	Canada	LW	1985–1987	40	2	2	4	198	—	—	—	—	—	
Chris McRae	Canada	LW	1989–1990	7	1	0	1	45	—	—	—	—	—	
Pat McReavy	Canada	C	1941–1942	34	5	8	13	0	11	1	1	2	4	
Derek Meech	Canada	D	2006–2010	126	4	12	16	39	—	—	—	—	—	
Harry Meeking	Canada	LW	1926–1927	6	0	0	0	4	—	—	—	—	—	
Harry Meeking	Canada	LW	1926–1927	6	0	0	0	4	—	—	—	—	—	
Wade Megan	United States	C	2018–2019	11	0	1	1	2	—	—	—	—	—	
Gerry Melnyk	Canada	C	1955–1961	133	19	26	45	14	23	4	0	4	2	
Barry Melrose	Canada	D	1983–1986	35	0	1	1	144	—	—	—	—	—	
Howie Menard	Canada	C	1963–1964	3	0	0	0	0	—	—	—	—	—	
Glenn Merkosky	Canada	LW	1985–1990	20	0	2	2	0	—	—	—	—	—	
Jon Merrill	United States	D	2020–2021	36	0	5	5	12	—	—	—	—	—	
Nick Mickoski	Canada	LW	1957–1959	103	19	27	46	50	4	0	0	0	4	
Drew Miller	United States	LW	2009–2017	504	56	51	107	111	44	4	6	10	14	
Hugh Millar	Canada	D	1946–1947	4	0	0	0	0	1	0	0	0	0	
Perry Miller	Canada	D	1977–1981	217	10	51	61	387	—	—	—	—	—	
Kevin Miller	United States	C	1990–2004	95	25	30	55	57	16	3	4	7	24	
Tom Miller	Canada	C	1970–1971	29	1	7	8	9	—	—	—	—	—	
Dmitri Mironov†	Russia	D	1997–1998	11	2	5	7	4	7	0	3	3	14	SC: 1998
John Miszuk	Canada	D	1963–1964	42	0	2	2	30	3	0	0	0	2	
Bill Mitchell	Canada	D	1963–1964	1	0	0	0	0	—	—	—	—	—	
Mike Modano	United States	C	2010–2011	40	4	11	15	8	2	0	1	1	0	HHOF – 2014
Ron Moffat	United States	LW	1932–1935	37	1	1	2	8	7	0	0	0	0	
John Mokosak	Canada	D	1988–1990	41	0	2	2	96	—	—	—	—	—	
Garry Monahan	Canada	LW	1969–1970	51	3	4	7	24	—	—	—	—	—	
Hank Monteith	Canada	LW	1968–1971	77	5	12	17	6	4	0	0	0	0	
Glenn Moore Sr.	United States	RW	2005-2006	—	—	—	—	—	—	—	—	—	—	
Jim Morrison	Canada	D	1959–1960	70	3	23	26	62	6	0	2	2	0	
Don Morrison	Canada	C	1947–1949	53	10	16	26	6	3	0	1	1	0	
Rod Morrison	Canada	RW	1947–1948	34	8	7	15	4	3	0	0	0	0	
Dean Morton	Canada	D	1989–1990	1	1	0	1	2	—	—	—	—	—	
Gus Mortson	Canada	D	1958–1959	36	0	1	1	22	—	—	—	—	—	
Tyler Motte	United States	C	2024–2025	55	4	5	9	6	—	—	—	—	—	
Alex Motter†	Canada	C	1937–1943	229	38	60	98	131	35	3	9	12	41	SC: 1943
Mark Mowers	United States	RW	2003–2006	98	7	19	26	20	3	0	0	0	0	
Wayne Muloin	Canada	D	1963–1964	3	0	1	1	2	—	—	—	—	—	
Donald Murdoch	Canada	RW	1981–1982	49	9	13	22	23	—	—	—	—	—	
Larry Murphy†	Canada	D	1996–2001	312	35	136	171	136	67	7	27	34	20	HHOF – 2004; SC: 1997, 1998
Ron Murphy	Canada	LW	1964–1966	90	30	26	56	42	5	0	1	1	4	
Joe Murphy	Canada	RW	1986–1990	90	14	18	32	71	8	0	1	1	6	
Brian Murphy	Canada	C	1974–1975	1	0	0	0	0	—	—	—	—	—	
Terry Murray	Canada	D	1976–1977	23	0	7	7	10	—	—	—	—	—	
Ken Murray	Canada	D	1972–1973	31	1	1	2	36	—	—	—	—	—	
Jan Muršak	Slovenia	LW	2010–2013	46	2	2	4	8	—	—	—	—	—	
Anders Myrvold	Norway	D	2003–2004	8	0	1	1	2	—	—	—	—	—	
Jim Nahrgang	Canada	D	1974–1977	57	5	12	17	34	—	—	—	—	—	
Vladislav Namestnikov	Russia	C	2020–2022	113	21	21	42	58	—	—	—	—	—	
Vaclav Nedomanský	Czechoslovakia	C	1977–1982	364	108	139	247	86	7	3	5	8	0	
Patrik Nemeth	Sweden	D	2019–2021	103	3	14	17	42	—	—	—	—	—	
Andrej Nestrašil	Czech Republic	C	2014–2015	13	0	2	2	4	—	—	—	—	—	
Kris Newbury	Canada	C	2009–2010	4	1	0	1	4	—	—	—	—	—	
Rick Newell	Canada	D	1972–1974	6	0	0	0	0	—	—	—	—	—	
John Newman	Canada	C	1930–1931	8	1	1	2	0	—	—	—	—	—	
Ed Nicholson	Canada	D	1947–1948	1	0	0	0	0	—	—	—	—	—	
Jim Niekamp	United States	D	1970–1972	29	0	2	2	37	—	—	—	—	—	
Frans Nielsen	Denmark	C	2016–2021	319	48	76	124	54	—	—	—	—	—	
Jim Nill	Canada	RW	1987–1990	122	11	20	31	156	22	6	1	7	87	
Reg Noble	Canada	C	1927–1933	227	23	24	47	307	4	0	0	0	2	HHOF – 1962
Theodore Nolan	Canada	RW	1981–1984	60	5	15	20	71	—	—	—	—	—	
Brad Norton	United States	D	2006–2007	6	0	1	1	20	—	—	—	—	—	
Lee Norwood	United States	D	1986–1991	259	36	96	132	539	38	4	14	18	87	
Tomáš Nosek	Czech Republic	LW	2015–2017	17	1	0	1	4	—	—	—	—	—	
Hank Nowak	Canada	LW	1974–1975	56	8	14	22	69	—	—	—	—	—	
Gustav Nyquist	Sweden	RW	2011–2019	481	125	170	295	124	35	4	4	8	10	
Mike O'Connell	United States	D	1985–1990	270	17	75	92	187	32	1	8	9	26	
Adam Oates	Canada	C	1985–1989	246	54	145	199	65	38	12	27	39	14	HHOF – 2012
Russell Oatman	Canada	LW	1926–1927	14	3	0	3	12	—	—	—	—	—	
Gerry Odrowski	Canada	D	1960–1963	138	2	10	12	69	12	0	0	0	6	
Jordan Oesterle	United States	D	2021–2023	97	4	15	19	23	—	—	—	—	—	
John Ogrodnick	Canada	LW	1979–1993	558	265	281	546	150	8	1	1	2	0	
Fredrik Olausson†	Sweden	D	2001–2002	47	2	13	15	22	21	2	4	6	10	SC: 2002
Murray Oliver	Canada	C	1957–1961	104	31	32	63	24	6	1	0	1	4	
Dennis Olson	Canada	C	1957–1958	4	0	0	0	0	—	—	—	—	—	
Jimmy Orlando†	Canada	D	1936–1943	199	6	25	31	375	36	0	9	9	105	SC: 1943
Mark Osborne	Canada	LW	1981–1983	160	45	65	110	144	—	—	—	—	—	
Steve Ott	Canada	LW	2016–2017	42	3	3	6	63	—	—	—	—	—	
Xavier Ouellet	Canada	D	2013–2018	141	5	18	23	63	1	0	0	0	0	
Pete Palangio	Canada	LW	1927–1928	14	3	0	3	8	—	—	—	—	—	
Richard Pánik	Slovakia	RW	2020–2021	12	1	3	4	2	—	—	—	—	—	
Brad Park	Canada	D	1983–1985	147	18	83	101	138	6	0	3	3	11	HHOF – 1988
Joe Paterson	Canada	LW	1980–1984	115	6	11	17	215	3	0	0	0	7	
George Patterson	Canada	LW	1934–1935	7	0	0	0	0	—	—	—	—	—	
Butch Paul	Canada	C	1964–1965	3	0	0	0	0	—	—	—	—	—	
Marty Pavelich†	Canada	LW	1947–1957	634	93	159	252	454	91	13	15	28	74	SC: 1950, 1952, 1954, 1955
Jim Pavese	United States	D	1987–1989	46	3	9	12	151	4	0	1	1	15	
Chase Pearson	Canada	C	2021–2022	3	0	0	0	0	—	—	—	—	—	
Mark Pederson	Canada	LW	1993–1994	2	0	0	0	2	—	—	—	—	—	
Bert Peer	Canada	RW	1939–1940	1	0	0	0	0	—	—	—	—	—	
Brendan Perlini	Canada	LW	2019–2020	39	1	3	4	10	—	—	—	—	—	
David Perron	Canada	LW	2022–2024; 2025–2026	174	44	62	106	125	—	—	—	—	—	
Jimmy Peters, Sr.†	Canada	RW	1949–1954	163	31	41	72	44	24	0	2	2	0	SC: 1950, 1954
Jimmy Peters, Jr.	Canada	C	1964–1968	54	6	7	13	10	—	—	—	—	—	
Brent Peterson	Canada	C	1978–1982	91	8	20	28	32	—	—	—	—	—	
Jeff Petry	United States	D	2023–2025	117	4	28	32	55	—	—	—	—	—	
Gord Pettinger†	Canada	C	1933–1938	151	21	42	63	39	24	3	4	7	4	SC: 1936, 1937
Robert Picard	Canada	D	1989–1990	20	0	3	3	20	—	—	—	—	—	
Joseph Pirus	Canada	RW	1979–1980	4	0	2	2	0	—	—	—	—	—	
Robert Plumb	Canada	LW	1977–1979	14	3	2	5	2	—	—	—	—	—	
Nels Podolsky	Canada	LW	1948–1949	1	0	0	0	0	7	0	0	0	4	
Bud Poile	Canada	RW	1948–1949	56	21	21	42	6	10	0	1	1	2	
Don Poile	Canada	C	1954–1958	66	7	9	16	12	4	0	0	0	0	
Dennis Polonich	Canada	C	1974–1983	390	59	82	141	1242	7	1	0	1	19	
Poul Popiel	United States	D	1968–1970	94	2	17	19	111	1	0	0	0	0	
Marc Potvin	Canada	RW	1990–1992	14	1	0	1	107	7	0	0	0	32	
Dean Prentice	Canada	LW	1965–1969	230	60	89	149	86	12	5	5	10	4	
Noel Price	Canada	D	1961–1962	20	0	1	1	6	—	—	—	—	—	
Keith Primeau	Canada	C	1990–1996	363	97	133	230	781	64	6	14	20	144	
Bob Probert	Canada	LW	1985–1994	474	114	145	259	2090	63	14	29	43	210	
Marcel Pronovost†	Canada	D	1949–1965	983	80	217	297	717	118	7	23	30	90	HHOF – 1978; SC: 1950, 1952, 1954, 1955
Andre Pronovost	Canada	LW	1962–1965	120	20	22	42	72	25	5	7	12	32	
Metro Prystai†	Canada	C	1950–1958	431	91	123	214	120	43	12	14	26	8	SC: 1952, 1954
Matt Puempel	Canada	LW	2018–2019	8	1	0	1	2	—	—	—	—	—	
Teemu Pulkkinen	Finland	LW	2013–2016	70	11	9	20	26	—	—	—	—	—	
Fido Purpur	Canada	RW	1944–1945	—	—	—	—	—	7	0	1	1	4	
Jamie Pushor†	Canada	D	1995–1998	134	6	13	19	217	5	0	1	1	5	SC: 1997
Frederick Pyatt	Canada	C	1973–1975	14	0	0	0	2	—	—	—	—	—	
Bill Quackenbush	Canada	D	1942–1949	313	40	89	129	49	47	2	6	8	4	HHOF – 1976
Kyle Quincey	Canada	D	2005–2008; 2011–2016	269	15	34	49	252	48	0	8	8	30	
Yves Racine	Canada	D	1989–1993	231	22	102	124	230	25	5	4	9	37	
Brian Rafalski†	United States	D	2007–2011	292	35	169	204	102	63	12	28	40	29	SC: 2008
Clare Raglan	Canada	D	1950–1951	33	3	1	4	14	—	—	—	—	—	
Mike Ramsey	United States	D	1994–1997	82	3	6	9	58	30	0	5	5	14	
Michael Rasmussen	Canada	C	2018–2026	454	66	88	154	243	—	—	—	—	—	
Matt Ravlich	Canada	D	1969–1970	46	0	6	6	33	—	—	—	—	—	
Lucas Raymond	Sweden	LW	2021–2026	400	123	207	330	110	—	—	—	—	—	
Marc Reaume	Canada	D	1959–1961	47	0	2	2	10	2	0	0	0	0	
Billy Reay	Canada	C	1943–1945	4	2	0	2	0	—	—	—	—	—	
Mickey Redmond	Canada	RW	1970–1976	317	177	133	310	107	—	—	—	—	—	
Earl Reibel†	Canada	C	1953–1958	306	74	141	215	53	35	6	14	20	4	SC: 1954, 1955
Gerry Reid	Canada	C	1948–1949	—	—	—	—	—	2	0	0	0	2	
Leo Reise†	Canada	D	1946–1952	340	21	61	82	251	52	8	5	13	68	SC: 1950, 1952
Dan Renouf	Canada	D	2016–2017; 2021–2022	5	0	0	0	7	—	—	—	—	—	
Brad Richards	Canada	C	2015–2016	68	10	18	28	8	5	1	0	1	7	
Dave Richardson	Canada	LW	1967–1968	1	0	0	0	0	—	—	—	—	—	
Steve Richmond	United States	D	1985–1986	29	1	2	3	82	—	—	—	—	—	
James Riley	Canada	LW	1926–1927	6	0	2	2	14	—	—	—	—	—	
Bob Ritchie	Canada	LW	1976–1978	28	8	4	12	10	—	—	—	—	—	
Mattias Ritola	Sweden	C	2007–2008; 2009–2010	7	0	1	1	0	1	0	0	0	0	
Jamie Rivers	Canada	D	2003–2006	65	3	5	8	53	2	0	0	0	2	
Wayne Rivers	Canada	RW	1961–1962	2	0	0	0	0	—	—	—	—	—	
Phil Roberto	Canada	RW	1974–1976	83	14	34	48	98	—	—	—	—	—	
Doug Roberts	United States	RW	1965–1975	134	27	39	66	53	—	—	—	—	—	
Torrie Robertson	Canada	LW	1988–1990	54	3	7	10	175	6	1	0	1	17	
Fred Robertson	Canada	D	1933–1934	24	1	0	1	12	—	—	—	—	—	
Nathan Robinson	Canada	C	2003–2004	5	0	0	0	2	—	—	—	—	—	
Luc Robitaille†	Canada	LW	2001–2003	162	41	40	81	88	27	5	5	10	10	HHOF – 2009; SC: 2002
Mike Robitaille	Canada	D	1970–1971	23	4	8	12	22	—	—	—	—	—	
Earl Roche	Canada	LW	1934–1935	13	3	3	6	0	—	—	—	—	—	
Des Roche	Canada	RW	1934–1935	15	3	0	3	10	—	—	—	—	—	
Leon Rochefort	Canada	RW	1971–1973	84	19	16	35	12	—	—	—	—	—	
Dave Rochefort	Canada	C	1966–1967	1	0	0	0	0	—	—	—	—	—	
Harvey Rockburn	Canada	D	1929–1930	78	4	1	5	215	—	—	—	—	—	
Marc Rodgers	Canada	RW	1999–2000	21	1	1	2	10	—	—	—	—	—	
Stacy Roest	Canada	C	1998–2003	110	11	17	28	26	3	0	0	0	0	
Dale Rolfe	Canada	D	1969–1971	64	5	18	23	60	4	0	2	2	8	
Roly Rossignol	Canada	RW	1943–1946	9	1	3	4	4	—	—	—	—	—	
Rolly Roulston†	Canada	LW	1935–1938	24	0	6	6	10	—	—	—	—	—	SC: 1937
Bob Rouse†	Canada	D	1994–1998	247	6	33	39	199	67	0	7	7	83	SC: 1997, 1998
Tom Rowe	United States	RW	1982–1983	51	6	10	16	44	—	—	—	—	—	
Carter Rowney	Canada	RW	2021–2022	26	4	2	6	0	—	—	—	—	—	
Bernie Ruelle	United States	LW	1943–1944	2	1	0	1	0	—	—	—	—	—	
Robbie Russo	United States	D	2016–2017	19	0	0	0	2	—	—	—	—	—	
Bobby Ryan	United States	LW	2020–2021	33	7	7	14	27	—	—	—	—	—	
Ruslan Salei	Belarus	D	2010–2011	75	2	8	10	48	11	1	0	1	0	
Borje Salming	Sweden	D	1989–1990	49	2	17	19	52	—	—	—	—	—	HHOF – 1996
Barry Salovaara	Canada	D	1974–1976	90	2	13	15	70	—	—	—	—	—	
Mikael Samuelsson†	Sweden	RW	2005–2009; 2012–2014	308	68	95	163	152	74	14	23	37	36	SC: 2008
Ulf Samuelsson	Sweden	D	1998–1999	4	0	0	0	6	9	0	3	3	10	
Ed Sandford	Canada	LW	1955–1956	4	0	0	0	0	—	—	—	—	—	
Axel Sandin Pellikka	Sweden	D	2025–2026	68	7	14	21	18	—	—	—	—	—	
Tomas Sandström†	Sweden	RW	1996–1997	34	9	9	18	36	20	0	4	4	24	SC: 1997
Kevin Schamehorn	Canada	RW	1976–1980	5	0	0	0	13	—	—	—	—	—	
Mathieu Schneider	United States	D	2002–2007	231	48	116	164	224	33	4	13	17	36	
James Schoenfeld	Canada	D	1981–1983	96	6	19	25	87	—	—	—	—	—	
Dwight Schofield	United States	D	1976–1977	3	1	0	1	2	—	—	—	—	—	
Enio Sclisizzi†	Canada	LW	1946–1952	67	12	9	21	26	13	0	0	0	6	SC: 1952
Earl Seibert	Canada	D	1944–1946	43	5	12	17	28	14	2	1	3	4	HHOF – 1963
Moritz Seider	Germany	D	2021–2026	410	39	201	240	222	—	—	—	—	—	
Richard Seiling	Canada	RW	1986–1987	74	3	8	11	49	7	0	0	0	5	
Brendan Shanahan†	Canada	LW	1996–2006	716	309	324	633	1037	106	33	41	74	131	HHOF – 2013; SC: 1997, 1998, 2002
Daniel Shank	Canada	RW	1989–1991	64	11	14	25	157	—	—	—	—	—	
Jeff Sharples	Canada	D	1986–1989	105	14	35	49	70	7	0	3	3	6	
Riley Sheahan	Canada	C	2011–2017	284	38	60	98	52	17	2	2	4	6	
Doug Shedden	Canada	C	1985–1987	44	8	15	23	8	—	—	—	—	—	
Bobby Sheehan	United States	C	1976–1977	34	5	4	9	2	—	—	—	—	—	
Timothy Sheehy	Canada	RW	1977–1978	15	0	0	0	0	—	—	—	—	—	
Frank Sheppard	Canada	C	1927–1928	8	1	1	2	0	—	—	—	—	—	
Johnny Sheppard	Canada	LW	1926–1928	87	23	18	41	100	—	—	—	—	—	
Ray Sheppard	Canada	RW	1991–1996	274	152	113	265	101	42	14	9	23	13	
John Sherf†	United States	LW	1935–1944	19	0	0	0	8	8	0	1	1	2	SC: 1937
Gordon Sherritt	Canada	D	1943–1944	8	0	0	0	12	—	—	—	—	—	
Dominik Shine	United States	F	2024–2026	27	3	1	4	22	—	—	—	—	—	
Jim Shires	Canada	LW	1970–1971	20	2	1	3	22	—	—	—	—	—	
Steve Short	United States	LW	1978–1979	1	0	0	0	0	—	—	—	—	—	
Gary Shuchuk	Canada	C	1990–1991	6	1	2	3	6	3	0	0	0	0	
David Silk	United States	RW	1984–1985	12	2	0	2	10	—	—	—	—	—	
Mike Sillinger	Canada	C	1990–1995	129	14	45	59	28	11	2	3	5	2	
Cully Simon†	Canada	D	1942–1945	101	4	10	14	112	14	1	0	1	6	SC: 1943
Thain Simon	Canada	D	1946–1947	3	0	0	0	0	—	—	—	—	—	
Cliff Simpson	Canada	C	1946–1948	6	0	1	1	0	2	0	0	0	2	
Reg Sinclair	Canada	RW	1952–1953	69	11	12	23	36	3	1	0	1	0	
Darryl Sittler	Canada	C	1984–1985	61	11	16	27	37	2	0	2	2	0	HHOF – 1989
Bjørn Skaare	Norway	C	1978–1979	1	0	0	0	0	—	—	—	—	—	
Glen Skov†	Canada	C	1949–1955	301	62	61	123	263	43	5	6	11	42	SC: 1952, 1954, 1955
Jiri Šlégr†	Czech Republic	D	2001–2002	8	0	1	1	8	1	0	0	0	2	SC: 2002
Alex Smith	Canada	D	1931–1932	48	6	8	14	47	2	0	0	0	4	
Brad Smith	Canada	RW	1980–1985	63	10	3	13	214	3	0	1	1	5	
Brendan Smith	Canada	D	2011–2017	291	15	52	67	281	27	2	4	6	24	
Brian Smith	Canada	LW	1957–1961	61	2	8	10	12	5	0	0	0	0	
Carl Smith	Canada	RW	1943–1944	7	1	1	2	2	—	—	—	—	—	
Craig Smith	United States	C	2024–2025	19	0	2	2	6	—	—	—	—	—	
Derek Smith	Canada	C	1981–1983	91	13	18	31	22	—	—	—	—	—	
Floyd Smith	Canada	RW	1962–1968	347	93	122	215	118	44	12	11	23	16	
Gemel Smith	Canada	C	2021–2022	3	0	1	1	5	—	—	—	—	—	
Givani Smith	Canada	RW	2019–2023	85	7	7	14	138	—	—	—	—	—	
Greg Smith	Canada	D	1981–1986	352	24	105	129	467	7	1	0	1	15	
Nakina Smith	Canada	C	1943–1944	10	1	2	3	0	—	—	—	—	—	
Richard Smith	Canada	D	1980–1981	11	0	2	2	6	—	—	—	—	—	
Ted Snell	Canada	RW	1974–1975	20	0	4	4	6	—	—	—	—	—	
Harold Snepsts	Canada	D	1985–1988	120	2	23	25	271	21	0	2	2	58	
Sandy Snow	Canada	RW	1968–1969	3	0	0	0	2	—	—	—	—	—	
Dennis Sobchuk	Canada	C	1979–1980	33	4	6	10	0	—	—	—	—	—	
Elmer Soderblom	Sweden	RW	2022–2026	86	11	11	22	26	—	—	—	—	—	
Ken Solheim	Canada	LW	1982–1983	10	0	0	0	2	—	—	—	—	—	
Bob Solinger	Canada	LW	1959–1960	1	0	0	0	0	—	—	—	—	—	
John Sorrell†	Canada	LW	1930–1938	347	96	86	182	75	31	8	12	20	6	SC: 1936, 1937
Fred Speck	Canada	C	1968–1970	10	0	0	0	2	—	—	—	—	—	
Ted Speers	United States	C	1985–1986	4	1	1	2	0	—	—	—	—	—	
Irv Spencer	Canada	D	1963–1968	30	3	1	4	12	15	0	0	0	6	
Daniel Sprong	Netherlands	RW	2023–2024	76	18	25	43	22	—	—	—	—	—	
Ryan Sproul	Canada	D	2013–2014; 2016–2017	28	1	6	7	6	—	—	—	—	—	
Andre St. Laurent	Canada	C	1977–1984	172	50	73	123	249	7	1	1	2	4	
Marc Staal	Canada	D	2020–2022	127	6	20	26	48	—	—	—	—	—	
Ron Stackhouse	Canada	D	1971–1974	185	12	68	80	198	—	—	—	—	—	
Garrett Stafford	United States	D	2007–2008	2	0	0	0	0	—	—	—	—	—	
Ed Stankiewicz	Canada	C	1953–1956	6	0	0	0	2	—	—	—	—	—	
Wilf Starr	Canada	C	1933–1936	61	4	3	7	17	7	0	2	2	2	
Vic Stasiuk†	Canada	LW	1950–1963	330	52	84	136	200	40	10	10	20	14	SC: 1952, 1955
Ray Staszak	United States	RW	1985–1986	4	0	1	1	7	—	—	—	—	—	
Troy Stecher	Canada	D	2020–2022	60	4	9	13	21	—	—	—	—	—	
Frank Steele	Canada	RW	1930–1931	1	0	0	0	0	—	—	—	—	—	
Pete Stemkowski	Canada	C	1967–1971	170	51	63	114	207	4	1	1	2	6	
Mitchell Stephens	Canada	C	2021–2022	27	0	6	6	8	—	—	—	—	—	
Jack Stewart†	Canada	D	1938–1950	502	30	79	109	704	80	5	14	19	143	HHOF – 1964; SC: 1943, 1950
Gaye Stewart	Canada	LW	1950–1951	67	18	13	31	18	6	0	2	2	4	
Blair Stewart	Canada	LW	1973–1975	36	0	9	9	54	—	—	—	—	—	
Gord Strate	Canada	D	1956–1959	61	0	0	0	34	—	—	—	—	—	
Art Stratton	Canada	C	1963–1964	5	0	3	3	2	—	—	—	—	—	
Ben Street	Canada	D	2016–2017	6	0	1	1	0	—	—	—	—	—	
Brad Stuart†	Canada	D	2007–2012	306	16	62	78	119	72	6	19	25	42	SC: 2008
Libor Šulák	Czech Republic	D	2018–2019	6	0	0	0	6	—	—	—	—	—	
Barry Sullivan	Canada	RW	1947–1948	1	0	0	0	0	—	—	—	—	—	
Oskar Sundqvist	Sweden	C	2021–2023	70	11	18	29	37	—	—	—	—	—	
Pius Suter	Switzerland	F	2021–2023	161	29	31	60	28	—	—	—	—	—	
Bill Sutherland	Canada	C	1971–1972	5	0	1	1	2	—	—	—	—	—	
Evgeny Svechnikov	Russia	LW	2016–2021	41	5	7	12	20	—	—	—	—	—	
John Taft	United States	D	1978–1979	15	0	2	2	4	—	—	—	—	—	
Jean-Guy Talbot	Canada	D	1967–1968	32	0	3	3	10	—	—	—	—	—	
Chris Tancill	United States	RW	1991–1993	5	1	0	1	2	—	—	—	—	—	
Eric Tangradi	United States	LW	2015–2016	1	0	0	0	0	—	—	—	—	—	
Vladimir Tarasenko	Russia	RW	2024–2025	80	11	22	33	6	—	—	—	—	—	
Tomáš Tatar	Slovakia	C	2010–2018	407	115	107	222	136	17	3	4	7	12	
Billy Taylor	Canada	C	1946–1947	60	17	46	63	35	5	1	5	6	4	
Tim Taylor†	Canada	C	1993–1997	139	15	22	37	107	26	0	5	5	16	SC: 1997
Edward Taylor	Canada	LW	1966–1967	2	0	0	0	0	—	—	—	—	—	
Lorrain Thibeault	Canada	LW	1944–1945	4	0	2	2	2	—	—	—	—	—	
Steve Thomas	Canada	RW	2003–2004	44	10	12	22	25	6	0	1	1	2	
Errol Thompson	Canada	LW	1977–1981	200	76	58	134	102	7	2	1	3	2	
Bill Thomson	Canada	C	1938–1944	9	2	2	4	0	2	0	0	0	0	
Dmytro Timashov	Sweden	LW	2019–2020	5	0	0	0	0	—	—	—	—	—	
Jordin Tootoo	Canada	RW	2012–2014	53	3	6	9	83	1	0	0	0	2	
Jerry Toppazzini	Canada	RW	1955–1956	40	1	7	8	31	—	—	—	—	—	
Larry Trader	Canada	D	1982–1985	55	3	9	12	45	3	0	0	0	0	
Percy Traub	Canada	D	1927–1929	88	3	1	4	124	2	0	0	0	0	
Dave Trottier	Canada	LW	1938–1939	11	1	1	2	16	—	—	—	—	—	
Dominic Turgeon	Canada	C	2017–2019	9	0	0	0	2	—	—	—	—	—	
Norm Ullman	Canada	C	1955–1968	875	324	434	758	552	80	27	47	74	61	HHOF – 1982
Garry Unger	Canada	C	1967–1971	216	84	68	152	165	4	0	1	1	6	
Eric Vail	Canada	LW	1981–1982	52	10	14	24	35	—	—	—	—	—	
Thomas Vanek	Austria	LW	2016–2017; 2018–2019	112	31	43	74	42	—	—	—	—	—	
James van Riemsdyk	United States	LW	2025–2026	72	15	16	31	14	—	—	—	—	—	
Rick Vasko	Canada	D	1977–1981	31	3	7	10	29	—	—	—	—	—	
Darren Veitch	Canada	D	1985–1988	153	20	83	103	99	23	4	9	13	14	
Joe Veleno	Canada	C	2021–2025	288	35	39	74	94	—	—	—	—	—	
Patrick Verbeek	Canada	RW	1999–2001	135	37	41	78	168	14	3	1	4	8	
Dennis Vial	Canada	LW	1990–1993	45	1	1	2	108	—	—	—	—	—	
Doug Volmar	Canada	RW	1969–1972	41	9	6	15	10	2	1	0	1	0	
Carl Voss	United States	C	1932–1934	46	6	16	22	8	4	1	1	2	0	
Jakub Vrána	Czech Republic	LW	2020–2023	42	22	10	32	18	—	—	—	—	—	
Jack Walker	Canada	LW	1926–1928	80	5	8	13	18	—	—	—	—	—	HHOF – 1960
Bob Wall	Canada	D	1964–1972	85	5	7	12	43	7	0	0	0	2	
Jesse Wallin	Canada	D	1999–2003	49	0	2	2	34	—	—	—	—	—	
Jake Walman	Canada	D	2021–2024	145	21	22	43	93	—	—	—	—	—	
Wes Walz	Canada	C	1995–1996	2	0	0	0	0	—	—	—	—	—	
Aaron Ward†	Canada	D	1993–2001	276	16	27	43	238	30	0	1	1	25	SC: 1997, 1998
Eddie Wares†	Canada	D	1937–1943	214	50	84	134	106	42	5	6	11	34	SC: 1943
Austin Watson	United States	LW	2024–2025	13	3	0	3	17	—	—	—	—	—	
Harry Watson	Canada	LW	1942–1946	94	27	28	55	14	12	2	0	2	0	HHOF – 1994
Bryan Watson	Canada	D	1965–1977	302	3	44	47	897	12	2	0	2	30	
Jim Watson	Canada	D	1963–1970	77	0	4	4	97	—	—	—	—	—	
Brian Watts	Canada	LW	1975–1976	4	0	0	0	0	—	—	—	—	—	
Tom Webster	Canada	RW	1970–1980	84	31	38	69	44	—	—	—	—	—	
Cooney Weiland	Canada	C	1933–1935	87	24	44	68	16	9	2	2	4	4	HHOF – 1971
Stan Weir	Canada	C	1982–1983	57	5	24	29	2	—	—	—	—	—	
Stephen Weiss	Canada	C	2013–2015	78	11	18	29	28	2	0	0	0	0	
Ian White	Canada	D	2011–2013	102	9	27	36	26	5	1	0	1	0	
Bob Whitelaw	Canada	D	1940–1942	32	0	2	2	2	8	0	0	0	0	
Ray Whitney	Canada	LW	2003–2004	67	14	29	43	22	12	1	3	4	4	
Arch Wilder	Canada	LW	1940–1941	18	0	2	2	2	—	—	—	—	—	
Bob Wilkie	Canada	D	1990–1991	8	1	2	3	2	—	—	—	—	—	
Jason Williams†	Canada	C	2000–2010	277	55	76	131	81	23	1	1	2	10	SC: 2002
Tiger Williams	Canada	LW	1984–1985	55	3	8	11	158	—	—	—	—	—	
Fred Williams	Canada	RW	1976–1977	44	2	5	7	10	—	—	—	—	—	
Burr Williams	United States	D	1933–1937	3	0	1	1	16	7	0	0	0	8	
Johnny Wilson†	Canada	LW	1949–1959	379	79	100	179	108	50	11	9	20	5	SC: 1950, 1952, 1954, 1955
Rick Wilson	Canada	D	1976–1977	77	3	13	16	56	—	—	—	—	—	
Larry Wilson†	Canada	C	1949–1953	21	0	4	4	12	4	0	0	0	0	SC: 1950
Scott Wilson	Canada	C/LW	2017–2018	17	0	0	0	0	—	—	—	—	—	
Murray Wing	Canada	D	1973–1974	1	0	1	1	0	—	—	—	—	—	
Eddie Wiseman	Canada	RW	1932–1936	131	24	30	54	43	9	0	1	1	4	
Luke Witkowski	United States	D	2017–2019; 2021–2022	66	1	5	6	91	—	—	—	—	—	
Benny Woit†	Canada	RW	1950–1955	262	6	18	24	122	41	2	6	8	18	SC: 1952, 1954, 1955
Steve Wojciechowski	Canada	RW	1944–1947	54	19	20	39	17	6	0	1	1	0	
Mike Wong	United States	C	1975–1976	22	1	1	2	12	—	—	—	—	—	
Paul Woods	Canada	C	1977–1984	501	72	124	196	276	7	0	5	5	4	
Jason Woolley	Canada	D	2002–2006	170	11	50	61	78	8	1	0	1	0	
Larry Wright	Canada	C	1977–1978	66	3	6	9	13	—	—	—	—	—	
Jason York	Canada	D	1992–1995	19	2	4	6	4	—	—	—	—	—	
Doug Young†	Canada	D	1931–1939	338	32	36	68	277	28	1	5	6	16	SC: 1936
Howie Young	Canada	D	1960–1968	229	9	46	55	660	19	2	4	6	46	
Warren Young	Canada	C	1985–1986	79	22	24	46	161	—	—	—	—	—	
B. J. Young	United States	RW	1999–2000	1	0	0	0	0	—	—	—	—	—	
Paul Ysebaert	Canada	LW	1990–1993	210	84	86	170	113	19	4	3	7	12	
Steve Yzerman†	Canada	C	1983–2006	1514	692	1063	1755	924	196	70	115	185	84	HHOF – 2009; SC – 1997, 1998, 2002; Ret # 19
Filip Zadina	Czech Republic	RW	2018–2023	190	28	40	68	22	—	—	—	—	—	
Larry Zeidel†	Canada	D	1951–1953	28	1	0	1	22	5	0	0	0	0	SC: 1952
Ed Zeniuk	Canada	D	1954–1955	2	0	0	0	0	—	—	—	—	—	
Henrik Zetterberg†	Sweden	LW	2002–2018	1,082	337	623	960	401	137	57	63	120	79	SC: 2008
Marek Židlický	Czech Republic	D	2014–2015	21	3	8	11	14	6	0	0	0	4	
Rick Zombo	United States	D	1984–1992	353	14	78	92	442	36	1	8	9	90	
Rudy Zunich	United States	D	1943–1944	2	0	0	0	2	—	—	—	—	—	

== Notes ==
- ^{a} Beginning in the 2005–06 season, ties are no longer possible. At the same time, the league began tracking overtime losses for goaltenders.
- ^{b} Save percentage did not become an official NHL statistic until the 1982–83 season. Therefore, goaltenders who played before 1982 do not have official save percentages.
- ^{c} The seasons column lists the first year of the season of the player's first game and the last year of the season of the player's last game. For example, a player who played one game in the 2000–01 season would be listed as playing with the team from 2000–01, regardless of what calendar year the game occurred within.
