= 2001–02 Detroit Red Wings season =

National Hockey League championship season

2001–02 Detroit Red Wings
- Stanley Cup champions
- Presidents' Trophy winners
- Western Conference champions
- Central Division champions
- Division: 1st Central
- Conference: 1st Western
- 2001–02 record: 51–17–10–4
- Home record: 28–7–5–1
- Road record: 23–10–5–3
- Goals for: 251
- Goals against: 187

Team information
- General manager: Ken Holland
- Coach: Scotty Bowman
- Captain: Steve Yzerman
- Alternate captains: Nicklas Lidstrom; Brendan Shanahan
- Arena: Joe Louis Arena
- Average attendance: 20,058 (100%)
- Minor league affiliates: Cincinnati Mighty Ducks; Toledo Storm

Team leaders
- Goals: Brendan Shanahan (37)
- Assists: Nicklas Lidstrom (50)
- Points: Brendan Shanahan (75)
- Penalty minutes: Chris Chelios (126)
- Plus/minus: Chris Chelios (40)
- Wins: Dominik Hasek (41)
- Goals against average: Dominik Hasek (2.17)

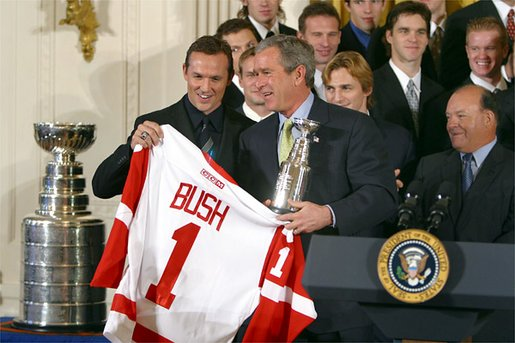
The 2002 Stanley Cup champion Red Wings present a jersey to U.S. President George W. Bush.

The 2001–02 Detroit Red Wings season was the 76th National Hockey League season in Detroit, Michigan. The Wings scored 116 points, winning the Central Division, their third Presidents' Trophy, and home ice throughout the playoffs. The team is considered one of the greatest teams in NHL history with ten future Hockey Hall of Famers on the team, as well as a Hall of Fame coach in Scotty Bowman.

After Detroit's shocking upset loss in the first playoff round to the Los Angeles Kings, general manager Ken Holland went out into the trade market to address Detroit's more glaring needs. He quickly filled them by trading for future Hall of Fame goaltender Dominik Hasek and signing veteran All-Stars Brett Hull and Luc Robitaille. These big names joined other future Hall of Famers such as Chris Chelios, Sergei Fedorov, Igor Larionov, Nicklas Lidstrom, Brendan Shanahan and Steve Yzerman, as well as important supporting players in Jiri Fischer, former All-Star Steve Duchesne, Tomas Holmstrom, the "Grind Line" of Kris Draper, Kirk Maltby, and Darren McCarty, and Pavel Datsyuk in his rookie season, and rounded out with legendary coach Scotty Bowman, who had decided to return for one more year.

The Red Wings began the season by winning 22 of their first 27 games. The roster featured 500-goal scorers, with Brendan Shanahan becoming the fourth teammate to reach the milestone during the season. Detroit finished the regular season with an NHL best 116 points to earn the top seed in the Western Conference. In the first round of the playoffs, the Vancouver Canucks took a 2-0 series lead before Detroit won four consecutive games to advance.

After winning against the St. Louis Blues, Detroit met the second-seeded Colorado Avalanche in the Western Conference Finals, reigniting their long-storied rivalry. Throughout the series, the two teams engaged in a contest that went on for seven games, with the series being tied three times before culminating in game seven in Detroit. With both teams on the brink of elimination, the Red Wings triumphed over the Avalanche in game seven with a final score of 7-0. After that, the Wings fought the Carolina Hurricanes for the Stanley Cup, winning in game five at home.

There was no All-Star game this year as the Winter Olympics in Salt Lake City took place in February 2002 where eleven Red Wings players represented their countries. Brendan Shanahan and Steve Yzerman represented Canada; Chris Chelios and Brett Hull represented the United States; Dominik Hasek represented the Czech Republic; Sergei Fedorov, Pavel Datsyuk and Igor Larionov represented Russia; and Nicklas Lidstrom, Fredrik Olausson, and Tomas Holmstrom represented Sweden.

The Red Wings sold out all 41 home games in 2001–02 as 20,058 fans packed Joe Louis Arena for every regular season and playoff game played in Detroit. The season was chronicled by Detroit Free Press sportswriter Nicholas J. Cotsonika's 2002 book, Hockey Gods: The Inside Story of the Red Wings' Hall of Fame Team. The 02 Red Wings are regarded as one of the best hockey teams of all time due to their historical significance.

== Regular season ==
The Red Wings tied the Los Angeles Kings for the most power-play goals scored during the regular season with 73.

=== Season standings ===
Central Division
No.	CR		GP	W	L	T	OTL	GF	GA	Pts
1	1	**Detroit Red Wings**	82	51	17	10	4	251	187	116
2	4	**St. Louis Blues**	82	43	27	8	4	227	188	98
3	5	**Chicago Blackhawks**	82	41	27	13	1	216	207	96
4	14	Nashville Predators	82	28	41	13	0	196	230	69
5	15	Columbus Blue Jackets	82	22	47	8	5	164	255	57

Note: CR = Conference rank; GP = Games played; W = Wins; L = Losses; T = Ties; OTL = Overtime loss; GF = Goals for; GA = Goals against; Pts = Points
Bolded teams qualified for the playoffs.

Western Conference
R		Div	GP	W	L	T	OTL	GF	GA	Pts
**1**	**p – Detroit Red Wings**	**CEN**	**82**	**51**	**17**	**10**	**4**	**251**	**187**	**116**
**2**	**y – Colorado Avalanche**	**NW**	**82**	**45**	**28**	**8**	**1**	**212**	**169**	**99**
**3**	**y – San Jose Sharks**	**PAC**	**82**	**44**	**27**	**8**	**3**	**248**	**199**	**99**
**4**	**St. Louis Blues**	**CEN**	**82**	**43**	**27**	**8**	**4**	**227**	**188**	**98**
**5**	**Chicago Blackhawks**	**CEN**	**82**	**41**	**27**	**13**	**1**	**216**	**207**	**96**
**6**	**Phoenix Coyotes**	**PAC**	**82**	**40**	**27**	**9**	**6**	**228**	**210**	**95**
**7**	**Los Angeles Kings**	**PAC**	**82**	**40**	**27**	**11**	**4**	**214**	**190**	**95**
**8**	**Vancouver Canucks**	**NW**	**82**	**42**	**30**	**7**	**3**	**254**	**211**	**94**
8.5
9	Edmonton Oilers	NW	82	38	28	12	4	205	182	92
10	Dallas Stars	PAC	82	36	28	13	5	215	213	90
11	Calgary Flames	NW	82	32	35	12	3	201	220	79
12	Minnesota Wild	NW	82	26	35	12	9	195	238	73
13	Mighty Ducks of Anaheim	PAC	82	29	42	8	3	175	198	69
14	Nashville Predators	CEN	82	28	41	13	0	196	230	69
15	Columbus Blue Jackets	CEN	82	22	47	8	5	164	255	57

Divisions: CEN – Central, PAC – Pacific, NW – Northwest

bold – Qualified for playoffs; p – Won Presidents' Trophy; y – Won division

== Playoffs ==
The Detroit Red Wings ended the 2001–02 regular season as the Western Conference's first seed and played Vancouver in the first round. After losing the first two games in Detroit, the Wings rallied back to win four straight. Then the Wings made quick work of the Blues before meeting the second-seeded Colorado Avalanche in the Western Conference Finals. The Wings would beat the Avalanche in a hard-fought seven game series, winning the final game 7–0. As the final game in the series came to a close, the Neil Diamond song "Sweet Caroline" was played over the Joe Louis Arena loudspeakers, as the victorious Red Wings prepared to head off to a Stanley Cup clinching series with the third-seeded victors of the Eastern Conference, the Carolina Hurricanes. They won the series in five games, defeating the Hurricanes three to one at home in Detroit on June 13 to take home their tenth Stanley Cup.

== Schedule and results ==
=== Regular season ===
2001–02 regular season
October: 11–2–0–0 (home: 5–2–0–0; road: 6–0–0–0)

Game	Date	Visitor	Score	Home	OT	Decision	Attendance	Record	Pts	Recap
1	October 4	Detroit	4 – 3	San Jose	OT	Hasek	17,496	1–0–0–0	2	W
2	October 6	Detroit	4 – 1	Vancouver		Hasek	18,422	2–0–0–0	4	W
3	October 10	Calgary	4 – 2	Detroit		Hasek	20,058	2–1–0–0	4	L
4	October 12	Buffalo	2 – 4	Detroit		Hasek	20,058	3–1–0–0	6	W
5	October 13	Detroit	5 – 4	NY Islanders	OT	Legace	16,234	4–1–0–0	8	W
6	October 16	Columbus	3 – 4	Detroit		Hasek	20,058	5–1–0–0	10	W
7	October 18	Philadelphia	2 – 3	Detroit		Hasek	20,058	6–1–0–0	12	W
8	October 20	Los Angeles	2 – 3	Detroit		Hasek	20,058	7–1–0–0	14	W
9	October 24	Edmonton	1 – 4	Detroit		Hasek	20,058	8–1–0–0	16	W
10	October 26	Dallas	5 – 3	Detroit		Hasek	20,058	8–2–0–0	16	L
11	October 27	Detroit	1 – 0	Nashville		Legace	17,113	9–2–0–0	18	W
12	October 30	Detroit	5 – 2	Carolina		Legace	18,730	10–2–0–0	20	W
13	October 31	Detroit	4 – 3	Dallas	OT	Legace	18,532	11–2–0–0	22	W

November: 11–1–1–1 (home: 8–0–1–0; road: 3–1–0–1)

Game	Date	Visitor	Score	Home	OT	Decision	Attendance	Record	Pts	Recap
14	November 2	NY Islanders	1 – 2	Detroit		Hasek	20,058	12–2–0–0	24	W
15	November 4	Detroit	4 – 5	Chicago		Hasek	20,989	12–3–0–0	24	L
16	November 7	Detroit	3 – 1	Phoenix		Hasek	15,023	13–3–0–0	26	W
17	November 9	Detroit	1 – 0	Anaheim		Hasek	17,174	14–3–0–0	28	W
18	November 10	Detroit	2 – 3	Los Angeles	OT	Hasek	18,385	14–3–0–1	29	OTL
19	November 13	Carolina	3 – 4	Detroit		Hasek	20,058	15–3–0–1	31	W
20	November 16	Minnesota	3 – 8	Detroit		Legace	20,058	16–3–0–1	33	W
21	November 17	Los Angeles	2 – 4	Detroit		Hasek	20,058	17–3–0–1	35	W
22	November 20	Nashville	3 – 6	Detroit		Hasek	20,058	18–3–0–1	37	W
23	November 21	Detroit	1 – 0	Columbus	OT	Legace	18,136	19–3–0–1	39	W
24	November 23	St. Louis	1 – 3	Detroit		Hasek	20,058	20–3–0–1	41	W
25	November 25	Chicago	4 – 4	Detroit	OT	Hasek	20,058	20–3–1–1	42	T
26	November 27	Calgary	2 – 4	Detroit		Hasek	20,058	21–3–1–1	44	W
27	November 30	New Jersey	2 – 4	Detroit		Legace	20,058	22–3–1–1	46	W

December: 6–5–2–1 (home: 4–2–1–0; road: 2–3–1–1)

Game	Date	Visitor	Score	Home	OT	Decision	Attendance	Record	Pts	Recap
28	December 1	Detroit	1 – 4	New Jersey		Hasek	18,559	22–4–1–1	46	L
29	December 5	Colorado	4 – 1	Detroit		Hasek	20,058	22–5–1–1	46	L
30	December 7	Detroit	1 – 1	Phoenix	OT	Hasek	20,058	22–5–2–1	47	T
31	December 10	Detroit	0 – 2	Calgary		Hasek	16,009	22–6–2–1	47	L
32	December 13	Detroit	2 – 1	Edmonton		Hasek	16,839	23–6–2–1	49	W
33	December 15	Detroit	0 – 3	Vancouver		Hasek	18,422	23–7–2–1	49	L
34	December 17	Chicago	2 – 0	Detroit		Legace	20,058	23–8–2–1	49	L
35	December 19	Vancouver	1 – 4	Detroit		Hasek	20,058	24–8–2–1	51	W
36	December 21	San Jose	0 – 3	Detroit		Hasek	20,058	25–8–2–1	53	W
37	December 23	Detroit	5 – 0	Chicago		Hasek	22,158	26–8–2–1	55	W
38	December 26	Detroit	3 – 3	Minnesota	OT	Hasek	18,568	26–8–3–1	56	T
39	December 27	Columbus	1 – 5	Detroit		Legace	20,058	27–8–3–1	58	W
40	December 29	Detroit	2 – 3	Nashville	OT	Hasek	17,244	27–8–3–2	59	OTL
41	December 31	Minnesota	2 – 4	Detroit		Hasek	20,058	28–8–3–2	61	W

January: 8–2–3–0 (home: 7–0–1–0; road: 1–2–2–0)

Game	Date	Visitor	Score	Home	OT	Decision	Attendance	Record	Pts	Recap
42	January 2	Anaheim	3 – 5	Detroit		Hasek	20,058	29–8–3–2	63	W
43	January 5	Colorado	1 – 3	Detroit		Hasek	20,058	30–8–3–2	65	W
44	January 9	Vancouver	4 – 5	Detroit	OT	Hasek	20,058	31–8–3–2	67	W
45	January 12	Dallas	2 – 5	Detroit		Hasek	20,058	32–8–3–2	69	W
46	January 15	Detroit	2 – 2	Phoenix	OT	Legace	15,186	32–8–4–2	70	T
47	January 16	Detroit	2 – 3	Dallas		Hasek	18,532	32–9–4–2	70	L
48	January 18	Washington	1 – 3	Detroit		Hasek	20,058	33–9–4–2	72	W
49	January 20	Ottawa	2 – 3	Detroit	OT	Hasek	20,058	34–9–4–2	74	W
50	January 23	San Jose	2 – 2	Detroit	OT	Hasek	20,058	34–9–5–2	75	T
51	January 25	Phoenix	1 – 4	Detroit		Legace	20,058	35–9–5–2	77	W
52	January 26	Detroit	5 – 2	St. Louis		Hasek	20,017	36–9–5–2	79	W
53	January 28	Detroit	1 – 1	Edmonton	OT	Hasek	16,839	36–9–6–2	80	T
54	January 30	Detroit	3 – 4	Calgary		Legace	17,239	36–10–6–2	80	L

February: 7–1–0–0 (home: 1–1–0–0; road: 6–0–0–0)

Game	Date	Visitor	Score	Home	OT	Decision	Attendance	Record	Pts	Recap
55	February 4	Detroit	3 – 1	Colorado		Hasek	18,007	37–10–6–2	82	W
56	February 6	NY Rangers	1 – 3	Detroit		Hasek	20,058	38–10–6–2	84	W
57	February 8	Columbus	3 – 2	Detroit		Legace	20,058	38–11–6–2	84	L
58	February 9	Detroit	3 – 2	Ottawa		Hasek	18,500	39–11–6–2	86	W
59	February 11	Detroit	3 – 2	Montreal		Hasek	21,273	40–11–6–2	88	W
60	February 13	Detroit	2 – 0	Minnesota		Hasek	18,568	41–11–6–2	90	W
61	February 26	Detroit	4 – 3	Tampa Bay	OT	Hasek	20,914	42–11–6–2	92	W
62	February 27	Detroit	3 – 2	Florida	OT	Hasek	19,250	43–11–6–2	94	W

March: 8–3–2–0 (home: 3–1–1–0; road: 5–2–1–0)

Game	Date	Visitor	Score	Home	OT	Decision	Attendance	Record	Pts	Recap
63	March 2	Detroit	4 – 2	Pittsburgh		Hasek	17,148	44–11–6–2	96	W
64	March 6	Toronto	2 – 6	Detroit		Hasek	20,058	45–11–6–2	98	W
65	March 9	Detroit	5 – 2	St. Louis		Hasek	19,921	46–11–6–2	100	W
66	March 10	Detroit	1 – 5	Buffalo		Hasek	18,690	46–12–6–2	100	L
67	March 13	Edmonton	3 – 4	Detroit	OT	Hasek	20,058	47–12–6–2	102	W
68	March 16	Detroit	1 – 2	Boston		Legace	17,565	47–13–6–2	102	L
69	March 17	Detroit	5 – 3	NY Rangers		Hasek	18,200	48–13–6–2	104	W
70	March 19	Anaheim	2 – 1	Detroit		Hasek	20,058	48–14–6–2	104	L
71	March 21	Detroit	3 – 2	Columbus	OT	Hasek	18,136	49–14–6–2	106	W
72	March 23	Detroit	2 – 0	Colorado		Hasek	18,007	50–14–6–2	108	W
73	March 25	Detroit	3 – 3	Nashville	OT	Legace	16,518	50–14–7–2	109	T
74	March 28	Nashville	3 – 3	Detroit	OT	Hasek	20,058	50–14–8–2	110	T
75	March 30	Atlanta	1 – 4	Detroit		Legace	20,058	51–14–8–2	112	W

April: 0–3–2–2 (home: 0–1–1–1; road: 0–2–1–1)

Game	Date	Visitor	Score	Home	OT	Decision	Attendance	Record	Pts	Recap
76	April 1	Toronto	5 – 4	Detroit	OT	Legace	20,058	51–14–8–3	113	OTL
77	April 3	Detroit	1 – 1	Anaheim	OT	Hasek	17,174	51–14–9–3	114	T
78	April 4	Detroit	0 – 3	Los Angeles		Hasek	18,621	51–15–9–3	114	L
79	April 6	Detroit	3 – 6	San Jose		Legace	17,496	51–16–9–3	114	L
80	April 10	Chicago	3 – 3	Detroit	OT	Hasek	20,058	51–16–10–3	115	T
81	April 13	Detroit	2 – 3	St. Louis	OT	Hasek	19,877	51–16–10–4	116	OTL
82	April 14	St. Louis	5 – 3	Detroit		Hasek	20,058	51–17–10–4	116	L

Legend: W Win (2 points) L Loss (0 points) T Tie (1 point) OTL Overtime loss (1 point)

=== Playoffs ===
2002 Stanley Cup playoffs
Western Conference Quarterfinals: vs. (8) Vancouver Canucks — Detroit wins 4–2

Game	Date	Visitor	Score	Home	OT	Decision	Attendance	Series	Recap
1	April 17	Vancouver	4 – 3	Detroit	OT	Hasek	20,058	Canucks lead 1–0	L
2	April 19	Vancouver	5 – 2	Detroit		Hasek	20,058	Canucks lead 2–0	L
3	April 21	Detroit	3 – 1	Vancouver		Hasek	18,422	Canucks lead 2–1	W
4	April 23	Detroit	4 – 2	Vancouver		Hasek	18,422	Series tied 2–2	W
5	April 25	Vancouver	0 – 4	Detroit		Hasek	20,058	Red Wings lead 3–2	W
6	April 27	Detroit	6 – 4	Vancouver		Hasek	18,422	Red Wings win 4–2	W

Western Conference Semifinals: vs. (4) St. Louis Blues — Detroit wins 4–1

Game	Date	Visitor	Score	Home	OT	Decision	Attendance	Series	Recap
1	May 2	St. Louis	0 – 2	Detroit		Hasek	20,058	Red Wings lead 1–0	W
2	May 4	St. Louis	2 – 3	Detroit		Hasek	20,058	Red Wings lead 2–0	W
3	May 7	Detroit	1 – 6	St. Louis		Hasek	19,107	Red Wings lead 2–1	L
4	May 9	Detroit	4 – 3	St. Louis		Hasek	19,999	Red Wings lead 3–1	W
5	May 11	St. Louis	0 – 4	Detroit		Hasek	20,058	Red Wings win 4–1	W

Western Conference Finals: vs. (2) Colorado Avalanche — Detroit wins 4–3

Game	Date	Visitor	Score	Home	OT	Decision	Attendance	Series	Recap
1	May 18	Colorado	3 – 5	Detroit		Hasek	20,058	Red Wings lead 1–0	W
2	May 20	Colorado	4 – 3	Detroit	OT	Hasek	20,058	Series tied 1–1	L
3	May 22	Detroit	2 – 1	Colorado	OT	Hasek	18,007	Red Wings lead 2–1	W
4	May 25	Detroit	2 – 3	Colorado		Hasek	18,007	Series tied 2–2	L
5	May 27	Colorado	2 – 1	Detroit	OT	Hasek	20,058	Avalanche lead 3–2	L
6	May 29	Detroit	2 – 0	Colorado		Hasek	18,007	Series tied 3–3	W
7	May 31	Colorado	0 – 7	Detroit		Hasek	20,058	Red Wings win 4–3	W

Stanley Cup Final: vs. (E3) Carolina Hurricanes — Detroit wins 4–1

Game	Date	Visitor	Score	Home	OT	Decision	Attendance	Series	Recap
1	June 4	Carolina	3 – 2	Detroit	OT	Hasek	20,058	Hurricanes lead 1–0	L
2	June 6	Carolina	1 – 3	Detroit		Hasek	20,058	Series tied 1–1	W
3	June 8	Detroit	3 – 2	Carolina	3OT	Hasek	18,982	Red Wings lead 2–1	W
4	June 10	Detroit	3 – 0	Carolina		Hasek	18,986	Red Wings lead 3–1	W
5	June 13	Carolina	1 – 3	Detroit		Hasek	20,058	Red Wings win 4–1	W

Legend: W Win L Loss

== Player statistics ==
=== Scoring ===
- Position abbreviations: C = Center; D = Defense; G = Goaltender; LW = Left wing; RW = Right wing
- † = Joined team via a transaction (e.g., trade, waivers, signing) during the season. Stats reflect time with the Red Wings only.
- ‡ = Left team via a transaction (e.g., trade, waivers, release) during the season. Stats reflect time with the Red Wings only.

No.	Player	Pos	Regular season						Playoffs					
No.	Player	Pos	GP	G	A	Pts	+/-	PIM	GP	G	A	Pts	+/-	PIM
14	Brendan Shanahan	LW	80	37	38	75	23	118	23	8	11	19	5	20
91	Sergei Fedorov	C	81	31	37	68	20	36	23	5	14	19	4	20
17	Brett Hull	RW	82	30	33	63	18	35	23	10	8	18	1	4
5	Nicklas Lidstrom	D	78	9	50	59	13	20	23	5	11	16	6	2
20	Luc Robitaille	LW	81	30	20	50	−2	38	23	4	5	9	4	10
19	Steve Yzerman	C	52	13	35	48	11	18	23	6	17	23	4	10
8	Igor Larionov	C	70	11	32	43	−5	50	18	5	6	11	5	4
24	Chris Chelios	D	79	6	33	39	40	126	23	1	13	14	15	44
13	Pavel Datsyuk	C	70	11	24	35	4	4	21	3	3	6	1	2
33	Kris Draper	C	82	15	15	30	26	56	23	2	3	5	4	20
96	Tomas Holmstrom	LW	69	8	18	26	−12	58	23	8	3	11	7	8
21	Boyd Devereaux	C	79	9	16	25	9	24	21	2	4	6	5	4
18	Kirk Maltby	LW	82	9	15	24	15	40	23	3	3	6	7	32
11	Mathieu Dandenault	D	81	8	12	20	−5	44	23	1	2	3	7	8
28	Steve Duchesne	D	64	3	15	18	3	28	23	0	6	6	6	24
27	Fredrik Olausson	D	47	2	13	15	9	22	21	2	4	6	3	10
25	Darren McCarty	RW	62	5	7	12	2	98	23	4	4	8	5	34
29	Jason Williams	C	25	8	2	10	2	4	9	0	0	0	−1	2
2	Jiri Fischer	D	80	2	8	10	17	67	22	3	3	6	6	30
42	Sean Avery	LW	36	2	2	4	1	68	—	—	—	—	—	—
32	Maxim Kuznetsov	D	39	1	2	3	0	40	—	—	—	—	—	—
41	Brent Gilchrist‡	LW	19	1	1	2	−3	8	—	—	—	—	—	—
39	Dominik Hasek	G	65	0	1	1		8	23	0	1	1		8
4	Uwe Krupp	D	8	0	1	1	−1	8	2	0	0	0	−5	2
34	Manny Legace	G	20	0	1	1		0	1	0	0	0		0
71	Jiri Slegr†	D	8	0	1	1	1	8	1	0	0	0	2	2
3	Jesse Wallin	D	15	0	1	1	−1	13	—	—	—	—	—	—
22	Yuri Butsayev‡	C	3	0	0	0	−1	0	—	—	—	—	—	—
15	Ladislav Kohn†	RW	4	0	0	0	0	4	—	—	—	—	—	—

=== Goaltending ===
No.	Player	Regular season										Playoffs								
No.	Player	GP	W	L	T	SA	GA	GAA	SV%	SO	TOI	GP	W	L	SA	GA	GAA	SV%	SO	TOI
39	Dominik Hasek	65	41	15	8	1654	140	2.17	.915	5	3873	23	16	7	562	45	1.86	.920	6	1455
34	Manny Legace	20	10	6	2	503	45	2.42	.911	1	1117	1	0	0	2	1	5.68	.500	0	11

== Awards and records ==
=== Awards ===
Type	Award/honor	Recipient	Ref
League (annual)	Conn Smythe Trophy	Nicklas Lidstrom	
League (annual)	James Norris Memorial Trophy	Nicklas Lidstrom	
League (annual)	NHL First All-Star Team	Chris Chelios (Defense)	
League (annual)	NHL First All-Star Team	Nicklas Lidstrom (Defense)	
League (annual)	NHL Second All-Star Team	Brendan Shanahan (Left wing)	
League (annual)	NHL Plus-Minus Award	Chris Chelios	
League (in-season)	NHL All-Star Game selection	Scotty Bowman (coach)	
League (in-season)	NHL All-Star Game selection	Chris Chelios (Note: Chelios was an injury replacement for Brian Rafalski of the New Jersey Devils.)	
League (in-season)	NHL All-Star Game selection	Sergei Fedorov (Note: Fedorov, Hasek, Lidstrom, and Shanahan were all voted to the starting lineup. Lidstrom garnered more votes than any other player.)	
League (in-season)	NHL All-Star Game selection	Dominik Hasek	
League (in-season)	NHL All-Star Game selection	Nicklas Lidstrom	
League (in-season)	NHL All-Star Game selection	Brendan Shanahan	
League (in-season)	NHL Player of the Week	Dominik Hasek (December 24)	
League (in-season)	NHL YoungStars Game selection	Pavel Datsyuk (Note: Datsyuk was an injury replacement for Krys Kolanos of the Phoenix Coyotes.)	

=== Milestones ===
Milestone	Player	Date	Ref
First game	Pavel Datsyuk	October 4, 2001	
First game	Sean Avery	December 19, 2001	
1,000th point	Brendan Shanahan	January 12, 2002	

== Transactions ==
The Red Wings were involved in the following transactions from June 10, 2001, the day after the deciding game of the 2001 Stanley Cup Final, through June 13, 2002, the day of the deciding game of the 2002 Stanley Cup Final.

=== Trades ===
Date	Details		Ref
June 24, 2001	To Detroit Red Wings: 5th-round pick in 2001	To Calgary Flames: 5th-round pick in 2001; 7th-round pick in 2001	
June 30, 2001	To Detroit Red Wings: Dominik Hasek	To Buffalo Sabres: Vyacheslav Kozlov; 1st-round pick in 2002; Future considerations	
July 9, 2001	To Detroit Red Wings: 2nd-round pick in 2002	To Carolina Hurricanes: Aaron Ward	
March 19, 2002	To Detroit Red Wings: Jiri Slegr	To Atlanta Thrashers: Yuri Butsayev; 3rd-round pick in 2002	

=== Players acquired ===
Date	Player	Former team	Term	Via	Ref
July 2, 2001	Luc Robitaille	Los Angeles Kings	2-year (Note: Club option for a third year.)	Free agency	
August 22, 2001	Brett Hull	Dallas Stars	2-year	Free agency	
September 1, 2001	Josh DeWolf	Montreal Canadiens		Free agency	
October 10, 2001	Ladislav Kohn	Atlanta Thrashers	1-year	Free agency	
December 21, 2001	Joey MacDonald	Toledo Storm (ECHL)		Free agency	

=== Players lost ===
Date	Player	New team	Via (Note: In parentheses is the player's free agency group on July 1 if applicable.)	Ref
July 1, 2001	Doug Brown (Note: Brown was inactive during the 2001–02 season. He attended Red Wings training camp in 2002 but was ultimately released and did not resume his playing career.)		Contract expiration (III)	
July 1, 2001	Larry Murphy (Note: Murphy retired.)		Contract expiration (III)	
July 1, 2001	Ken Wregget (Note: Wregget retired.)		Contract expiration (III)	
July 2, 2001	Martin Lapointe	Boston Bruins	Free agency (V)	
July 4, 2001	Toivo Suursoo	Lulea HF (SHL)	Free agency (VI)	
July 24, 2001	Todd Gill	Colorado Avalanche	Free agency (III)	
August 31, 2001	Pat Verbeek	Dallas Stars	Free agency (III)	
September 28, 2001	Chris Osgood	New York Islanders	Waiver draft	
October 2, 2001	Marc Rodgers	Knoxville Speed (UHL)	Free agency (VI)	
October 17, 2001	Aren Miller	Oklahoma City Blazers (CHL)	Free agency (UFA)	
February 13, 2002	Brent Gilchrist	Dallas Stars	Waivers	

=== Signings ===
Date	Player	Term	Contract type	Ref
June 27, 2001	Brent Gilchrist	1-year	Option exercised	
July 1, 2001	Dominik Hasek	3-year (Note: The final two years on the contract are option years.)	Re-signing	
July 12, 2001	Pavel Datsyuk	2-year	Entry-level	
August 2, 2001	Jesse Wallin	1-year	Re-signing	
August 6, 2001	Mathieu Dandenault	1-year	Re-signing	
September 4, 2001	Tomas Holmstrom	3-year	Re-signing	
December 7, 2001	Nicklas Lidstrom	2-year	Extension	
December 28, 2001	Manny Legace	4-year	Extension	
May 16, 2002	Henrik Zetterberg	3-year	Entry-level	

== Draft picks ==
Detroit's picks at the 2001 NHL entry draft in Sunrise, Florida. The Wings had the 29th overall pick, however traded it to Chicago in 1999 during the deal to acquire Chris Chelios.

Round	#	Player	Nationality	College/Junior/Club team (League)
2	62	Igor Grigorenko (RW)	Russia	Lada Togliatti (Russia)
4	121	Drew MacIntyre (G)	Canada	Sherbrooke Castors (QMJHL)
4	129	Miroslav Blatak (D)	Czech Republic	HC Zlín (Czech Republic)
5	157	Andreas Jamtin (RW)	Sweden	Färjestad BK (Sweden)
6	195	Nick Pannoni (G)	Canada	Seattle Thunderbirds (WHL)
8	258	Dmitry Bykov (D)	Russia	Ak Bars Kazan (Russia)
9	288	Francois Senez (D)	Canada	Drummondville Voltigeurs (QMJHL)

== Farm teams ==
=== Cincinnati Mighty Ducks ===
The Mighty Ducks were Detroit's top affiliate in the American Hockey League (AHL) in 2001–02 and were coached by Mike Babcock (who later became Red Wings coach in 2005).

=== Toledo Storm ===
The Storm were the Red Wings' ECHL affiliate for the 2001–02 season. Now known as the Toledo Walleye and still an affiliate to the Red Wings.

== See also ==
- 2001–02 NHL season
