= 2002 Stanley Cup Final =

2002 ice hockey championship series

	1	2	3	4	5	Total
Detroit Red Wings	2*	3	3***	3	3	4
Carolina Hurricanes	3*	1	2***	0	1	1
- * – Denotes overtime period(s)
- Location(s): Detroit: Joe Louis Arena (1, 2, 5); Raleigh: Raleigh Entertainment & Sports Arena (3, 4)
- Coaches: Detroit: Scotty Bowman; Carolina: Paul Maurice
- Captains: Detroit: Steve Yzerman; Carolina: Ron Francis
- National anthems: Detroit: Karen Newman; Carolina: Unknown
- Referees: Bill McCreary (1, 3, 5); Stephen Walkom (1, 3, 5); Don Koharski (2, 4); Paul Devorski (2, 4)
- Dates: June 4–13, 2002
- MVP: Nicklas Lidström (Red Wings)
- Series-winning goal: Brendan Shanahan (14:04, second)
- Hall of Famers: Red Wings: Chris Chelios (2013); Pavel Datsyuk (2024); Sergei Fedorov (2015); Dominik Hašek (2014); Brett Hull (2009); Igor Larionov (2008); Nicklas Lidström (2015); Luc Robitaille (2009); Brendan Shanahan (2013); Steve Yzerman (2009); Hurricanes: Ron Francis (2007); Coaches: Scotty Bowman (1991); Officials: Bill McCreary (2014)
- Networks: Canada: (English): CBC (French): SRC; United States: (English): ESPN (1–2), ABC (3–5)
- Announcers: (CBC) Bob Cole and Harry Neale (SRC) Claude Quenneville and Michel Bergeron (ESPN/ABC) Gary Thorne and Bill Clement (NHL International) Dave Strader and Joe Micheletti

The 2002 Stanley Cup Final was the championship series of the National Hockey League's (NHL) 2001–02 season, and the culmination of the 2002 Stanley Cup playoffs. It was contested by the Western Conference champion Detroit Red Wings and the Eastern Conference champion Carolina Hurricanes. It was Detroit's twenty-second appearance in the Finals, their previous appearance being a win in 1998. It was Carolina's first appearance in the Finals in franchise history. The Red Wings defeated the Hurricanes in five games to win their tenth Stanley Cup championship in franchise history. The Red Wings became the third team in NHL history to win 10 or more Stanley Cup titles, joining the Toronto Maple Leafs and Montreal Canadiens. As of 2026, this is the last time the Red Wings won the Stanley Cup at home.

The Red Wings became the first team in NHL history to win the Cup after starting the playoffs with two losses at home. After losing the first two games in the Conference Quarterfinals to the Vancouver Canucks, the Red Wings won 16 of their next 21 games en route to win their third Cup since 1997 for coach Scotty Bowman. Bowman won his ninth Cup as a head coach (he had previously won it in that capacity with the Montreal Canadiens in 1973, 1976, 1977, 1978, and 1979, with the Pittsburgh Penguins in 1992, and with Detroit in 1997 and 1998), surpassing the mark he held jointly with Montreal coach Toe Blake. It was his final game as a head coach, as he announced his retirement immediately after the Game 5 victory. It was the last Detroit championship to feature members of the Russian Five, as Sergei Fedorov and Igor Larionov were still with the team.

== Paths to the Finals ==
=== Carolina Hurricanes ===
The Hurricanes finished the regular season with 91 points, clinching the Southeast Division and the third seed in the Eastern Conference. In the first round, the Hurricanes defeated the two-time defending Eastern Conference champion New Jersey Devils in six games. In the second round, the Hurricanes dispatched the eighth seeded Montreal Canadiens in six games to reach their first Eastern Conference Final since moving from Hartford. In the Eastern Conference Finals, the Hurricanes defeated the fourth seeded Toronto Maple Leafs in six games apiece to advance to the Finals for the first time in franchise history, becoming the first team from North Carolina to ever play for a major professional sports championship.

=== Detroit Red Wings ===
After a surprise upset at the hands of the Los Angeles Kings in the first round of the playoffs the previous season, the Red Wings bolstered their roster in the offseason by signing forwards Luc Robitaille and Brett Hull, goaltender Dominik Hašek (the defending Vezina Trophy winner), and Russian prospect Pavel Datsyuk.

Strengthened by their new signings, the Red Wings finished with the league's best record at 116 points, clinching the Presidents' Trophy and the overall #1 seed in the playoffs.

In the first round, the Red Wings survived an early scare against the eighth-seeded Vancouver Canucks as they lost the first two games at home, but recovered to win four straight games and advance to the next round, where they defeated the fourth seed St. Louis Blues in five quick games. In the Western Conference Finals, the Red Wings faced the defending Stanley Cup champion Colorado Avalanche. After dropping Game 5 at home in overtime, it was felt that the Red Wings would be eliminated headed to Denver for Game 6. However, Hašek posted two shutouts in Games 6 and 7, including a 7–0 blowout win in Game 7 at home, to return to the Stanley Cup Final for the fourth time in eight years.

== Game summaries ==
Number in parentheses represents the player's total in goals or assists to that point of the entire four rounds of the playoffs

This was the first appearance in the Stanley Cup Final for the Hurricanes (formerly the Hartford Whalers), who made an unlikely run to the Cup. While they were seeded third as a division winner, they actually had the second-lowest point total (91) for a playoff team not only in the Eastern Conference, but also the whole NHL (ahead of only Montreal). In their whole NHL history, they had only won one playoff series prior to this season (as the Whalers in 1986) and had streaks of five and six seasons in which they did not make the playoffs. As the Red Wings won the Presidents' Trophy with 116 points, the 25-point differential was the largest between two teams in a Stanley Cup Final since 1994 when there were 27 points between the New York Rangers (112) and the Canucks (85).

The Hurricanes stunned the Red Wings in the first game on the strength of Ron Francis's overtime goal. It was the first time the team had won a game in Detroit since 1989. That would be Carolina's only win in the series as the Red Wings won four straight, including a triple overtime win in game three. The Cup win was the first for many veterans on the team, including goaltender Dominik Hašek, forward Luc Robitaille, and defencemen Steve Duchesne (who retired after this season) and Fredrik Olausson. It was the second Cup win for Chris Chelios, sixteen years after he first won the Cup as a member of the Montreal Canadiens in 1986.

=== Game one ===
June 4	Carolina Hurricanes	3–2	OT	Detroit Red Wings	Joe Louis Arena	Recap

Scoring summary
Period	Team	Goal	Assist(s)	Time	Score
1st	DET	Sergei Fedorov (5) – pp	Steve Yzerman (14)	15:21	1–0 DET
2nd	CAR	Sean Hill (4) – pp	Sami Kapanen (7) and Ron Francis (9)	03:30	1–1
2nd	DET	Kirk Maltby (2)	Darren McCarty (4)	10:39	2–1 DET
2nd	CAR	Jeff O'Neill (6)	Aaron Ward (1)	19:10	2–2
3rd	None				
OT	CAR	Ron Francis (6)	Jeff O'Neill (5) and Sami Kapanen (8)	00:58	3–2 CAR
Penalty summary
Period	Team	Player	Penalty	Time	PIM
1st	CAR	Bret Hedican	High-sticking	08:03	2:00
1st	DET	Luc Robitaille	Tripping	10:28	2:00
1st	CAR	Sean Hill	Tripping	11:15	2:00
1st	CAR	Glen Wesley	Interference	15:03	2:00
2nd
2nd	CAR	Bench (served by Erik Cole)	Too many men on the ice	00:34	2:00
2nd	DET	Igor Larionov	High-sticking	02:07	2:00
2nd	DET	Kris Draper	Hooking	02:44	2:00
2nd	CAR	Jaroslav Svoboda	High-sticking	04:28	2:00
2nd	CAR	Niclas Wallin	Roughing	07:41	2:00
2nd	DET	Mathieu Dandenault	Tripping	12:12	2:00
3rd
3rd	DET	Boyd Devereaux	Holding the stick	05:49	2:00
3rd	DET	Igor Larionov	High-sticking	12:17	2:00
3rd	CAR	Erik Cole	Hooking	18:19	2:00
OT	None				

Shots by period
Team	1	2	3	OT	Total
Carolina	7	13	5	1	26
Detroit	8	12	5	0	25

=== Game two ===
June 6	Carolina Hurricanes	1–3	Detroit Red Wings	Joe Louis Arena	Recap

Scoring summary
Period	Team	Goal	Assist(s)	Time	Score
1st	DET	Kirk Maltby (3) – sh	Kris Draper (3) and Chris Chelios (11)	06:33	1–0 DET
1st	CAR	Rod Brind'Amour (4) – sh	Unassisted	14:47	1–1
2nd	None				
3rd	DET	Nicklas Lidström (5) – pp	Sergei Fedorov (11) and Steve Yzerman (15)	14:52	2–1 DET
3rd	DET	Kris Draper (2)	Nicklas Lidström (10) and Fredrik Olausson (3)	15:05	3–1 DET
Penalty summary
Period	Team	Player	Penalty	Time	PIM
1st	DET	Kris Draper	Boarding	01:25	2:00
1st	DET	Steve Duchesne	Holding	05:21	2:00
1st	CAR	Sean Hill	Slashing	06:33	2:00
1st	CAR	Jaroslav Svoboda	Roughing	14:03	2:00
1st	CAR	Sean Hill	Holding	16:23	2:00
2nd	CAR	Bates Battaglia	Holding	01:05	2:00
2nd	DET	Steve Duchesne	Tripping	03:55	2:00
2nd	DET	Bench (served by Boyd Devereaux)	Too many men on the ice	07:23	2:00
2nd	CAR	Martin Gélinas	Interference	10:10	2:00
2nd	CAR	Aaron Ward	Holding	18:03	2:00
3rd	DET	Jiří Fischer	High-sticking	09:38	2:00
3rd	CAR	Martin Gélinas	Slashing	14:00	2:00
3rd	DET	Jiří Fischer	Slashing	17:15	2:00
3rd	CAR	Bates Battaglia	Charging	17:45	2:00
3rd	CAR	Rod Brind'Amour	Roughing	19:33	2:00
3rd	CAR	Erik Cole	Roughing	19:33	2:00
3rd	DET	Darren McCarty	Roughing	19:33	2:00
3rd	DET	Kirk Maltby	Roughing	19:33	2:00
3rd	DET	Chris Chelios	Roughing	19:33	2:00
3rd	DET	Brett Hull	Tripping	19:41	2:00

Shots by period
Team	1	2	3	Total
Carolina	7	4	6	17
Detroit	9	8	13	30

=== Game three ===
June 8	Detroit Red Wings	3–2	3OT	Carolina Hurricanes	Raleigh Entertainment & Sports Arena	Recap

Scoring summary
Period	Team	Goal	Assist(s)	Time	Score
1st	CAR	Josef Vašíček (3)	Martin Gélinas (4) and Glen Wesley (1)	14:49	1–0 CAR
2nd	DET	Igor Larionov (3)	Brett Hull (8)	05:33	1–1
3rd	CAR	Jeff O'Neill (7)	Ron Francis (10)	07:34	2–1 CAR
3rd	DET	Brett Hull (9)	Nicklas Lidström (11) and Sergei Fedorov (12)	18:46	2–2
OT	None				
2OT	None				
3OT	DET	Igor Larionov (4)	Tomas Holmström (3) and Steve Duchesne (6)	14:47	3–2 DET
Penalty summary
Period	Team	Player	Penalty	Time	PIM
1st	CAR	Rod Brind'Amour	Holding the stick	01:45	2:00
1st	CAR	Bret Hedican	Boarding	03:32	2:00
1st	CAR	Jeff O'Neill	Boarding	11:34	2:00
1st	DET	Nicklas Lidström	Tripping	12:30	2:00
1st	DET	Boyd Devereaux	Slashing	19:15	2:00
2nd	DET	Kirk Maltby	Unsportsmanlike conduct	05:13	2:00
2nd	CAR	Aaron Ward	Unsportsmanlike conduct	05:13	2:00
2nd	DET	Chris Chelios	Interference	08:12	2:00
2nd	DET	Sergei Fedorov	Holding	19:44	2:00
2nd	CAR	Sean Hill	Holding	19:44	2:00
3rd	DET	Brendan Shanahan	Roughing	05:25	2:00
3rd	CAR	Josef Vašíček	Roughing	05:25	2:00
3rd	DET	Steve Duchesne	Holding	09:58	2:00
3rd	DET	Brendan Shanahan	Roughing	19:01	2:00
3rd	CAR	Sean Hill	Roughing	19:01	2:00
OT	DET	Steve Duchesne	Roughing	18:23	2:00
OT	CAR	Jaroslav Svoboda	Roughing	18:23	2:00
2OT	CAR	Erik Cole	Holding the stick	08:35	2:00
2OT	DET	Fredrik Olausson	Holding	13:25	2:00
3OT	None				

Shots by period
Team	1	2	3	OT	2OT	3OT	T
Detroit	6	7	16	11	6	7	53
Carolina	8	6	7	5	8	9	43

=== Game four ===
June 10	Detroit Red Wings	3–0	Carolina Hurricanes	Raleigh Entertainment & Sports Arena	Recap

Scoring summary
Period	Team	Goal	Assist(s)	Time	Score
1st	None				
2nd	DET	Brett Hull (10)	Boyd Devereaux (4) and Fredrik Olausson (4)	06:32	1–0 DET
3rd	DET	Igor Larionov (5)	Jiří Fischer (3) and Luc Robitaille (5)	03:43	2–0 DET
3rd	DET	Brendan Shanahan (6)	Sergei Fedorov (13) and Chris Chelios (12)	14:43	3–0 DET
Penalty summary
Period	Team	Player	Penalty	Time	PIM
1st	CAR	Glen Wesley	Hooking	02:05	2:00
1st	DET	Sergei Fedorov	High-sticking	16:54	2:00
1st	CAR	Erik Cole	Goaltender interference	16:54	2:00
2nd	DET	Luc Robitaille	High-sticking	09:06	2:00
2nd	DET	Steve Duchesne	Holding the stick	14:34	2:00
3rd	CAR	Sean Hill	Boarding	08:34	2:00

Shots by period
Team	1	2	3	Total
Detroit	10	6	11	27
Carolina	6	7	4	17

=== Game five ===
June 13	Carolina Hurricanes	1–3	Detroit Red Wings	Joe Louis Arena	Recap

Scoring summary
Period	Team	Goal	Assist(s)	Time	Score
1st	None				
2nd	DET	Tomas Holmström (8)	Igor Larionov (6) and Chris Chelios (13)	04:07	DET 1–0
2nd	DET	Brendan Shanahan (7) – pp	Sergei Fedorov (14) and Steve Yzerman (16)	14:04	DET 2–0
2nd	CAR	Jeff O'Neill (8) – pp	Sean Hill (4) and Glen Wesley (2)	18:50	DET 2–1
3rd	DET	Brendan Shanahan (8) – en	Steve Yzerman (17)	19:15	DET 3–1
Penalty summary
Period	Team	Player	Penalty	Time	PIM
1st	CAR	Bench (served by Josef Vašíček)	Too many men on the ice	12:09	2:00
2nd	DET	Jiří Šlégr	Holding	06:00	2:00
2nd	CAR	Jaroslav Svoboda	Roughing	13:34	2:00
2nd	CAR	Erik Cole	Roughing	16:15	2:00
2nd	DET	Brendan Shanahan	Hooking	16:53	2:00
3rd	DET	Sergei Fedorov	Cross-checking	05:23	2:00
3rd	CAR	Josef Vašíček	Interference	08:12	2:00

Shots by period
Team	1	2	3	Total
Carolina	5	7	5	17
Detroit	12	8	7	27

The Red Wings became the sixth team to win the President's Trophy and the Stanley Cup in the same season since the former trophy's introduction in the 1985-86 season. To date, only two more President's Trophy winners have gone on to win the Cup. The Red Wings completed the feat again in the 2007-08 season, and the Chicago Blackhawks did double duty in the lockout-shortened 2012-13 season.

This Red Wings' victory was the second time in less than a decade that the New Jersey Devils, Colorado Avalanche, and Red Wings won the Stanley Cup in three consecutive seasons and in that order. New Jersey won in 2000 and Colorado in 2001 before Detroit's 2002 title; the same sequence had first occurred when the Devils won in 1995 (at the Red Wings' expense), the Avalanche in 1996, and the Red Wings in 1997.

The Hurricanes would make a return trip to the Final in 2006, where they defeated the Edmonton Oilers in seven games to win their first Stanley Cup in franchise history.

== Team rosters ==
=== Carolina Hurricanes ===
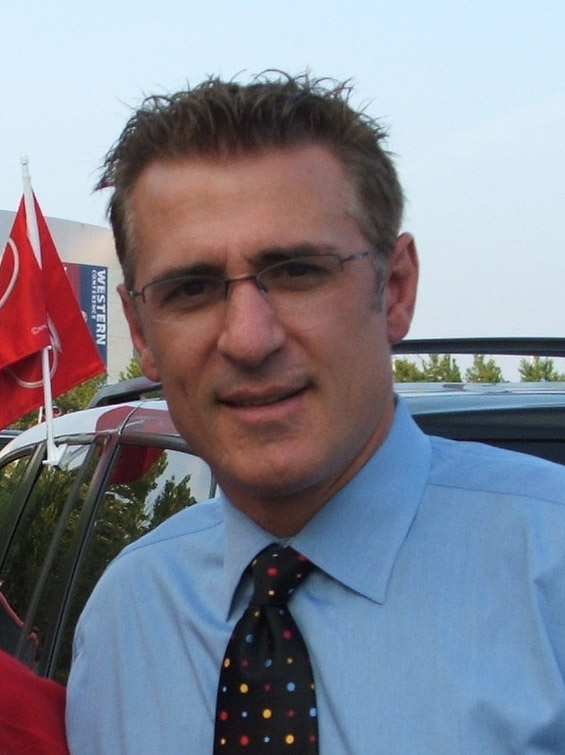
Ron Francis (pictured in 2006) captained the Hurricanes to their first Final appearance in franchise history.

Goaltenders
#	Player	Catches	Acquired	Place of birth		Finals appearance
1	Artūrs Irbe	L	1998–99	(Latvia)	Riga, Soviet Union	first
80	Kevin Weekes	L	2001–02	(Canada)	Toronto, Ontario	first (did not play)

Defencemen
#	Player	Shoots	Acquired	Place of birth		Finals appearance
2	Glen Wesley – A	L	1994–95	(Canada)	Red Deer, Alberta	third (1988, 1990)
4	Aaron Ward	R	2001–02	(Canada)	Windsor, Ontario	third (1997, 1998)
5	Marek Malík	L	1993	(Czech Republic)	Ostrava, Czechoslovakia	first
6	Bret Hedican	L	2001–02	(United States)	Saint Paul, Minnesota	second (1994)
7	Niclas Wallin	L	2000	(Sweden)	Boden, Sweden	first
22	Sean Hill	R	2001–02	(United States)	Duluth, Minnesota	second (1993)
45	David Tanabe	R	1999	(United States)	White Bear Lake, Minnesota	first (did not play)

Forwards
#	Player	Position	Shoots	Acquired	Place of birth		Finals appearance
10	Ron Francis – C	C	L	1998–99	(Canada)	Sault Ste. Marie, Ontario	third (1991, 1992)
11	Jeff Daniels	C	L	1999–2000	(Canada)	Oshawa, Ontario	first
12	Craig MacDonald	LW	L	1996	(Canada)	Antigonish, Nova Scotia	first (did not play)
13	Bates Battaglia	LW	L	1997–98	(United States)	Chicago, Illinois	first
15	Kevyn Adams	C	R	2001–02	(United States)	Washington, D.C.	first
16	Tommy Westlund	RW	R	1998	(Sweden)	Fors, Sweden	first
17	Rod Brind'Amour – A	C	L	1999–2000	(Canada)	Ottawa, Ontario	second (1997)
23	Martin Gélinas	LW	L	1997–98	(Canada)	Shawinigan, Quebec	third (1990, 1994)
24	Sami Kapanen	RW	L	1995	(Finland)	Vantaa, Finland	first
26	Erik Cole	RW	R	1998	(United States)	Oswego, New York	first
27	Craig Adams	RW	R	1996	(Canada)	Seria, Brunei	first (did not play)
62	Jaroslav Svoboda	LW	L	1998	(Czech Republic)	Červenka, Czechoslovakia	first
63	Josef Vašíček	C	L	1998	(Czech Republic)	Havlíčkův Brod, Czechoslovakia	first
92	Jeff O'Neill	RW	R	1994	(Canada)	Richmond Hill, Ontario	first

=== Detroit Red Wings ===
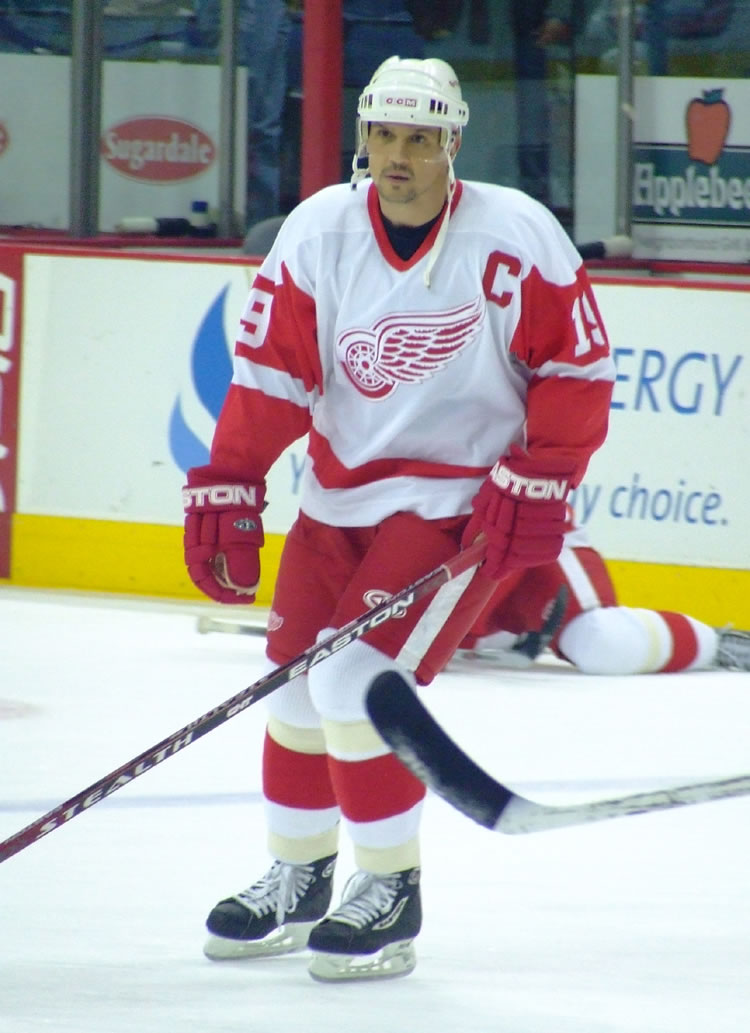
Steve Yzerman (pictured in 2005) captained the Red Wings in a Stanley Cup Final for the fourth and last time in his career.

Goaltenders
#	Player	Catches	Acquired	Place of birth		Finals appearance
34	Manny Legace	L	1999–2000	(Canada)	Toronto, Ontario	first (did not play)
39	Dominik Hašek	L	2001–02	(Czech Republic)	Pardubice, Czechoslovakia	third (1992, 1999)

Defencemen
#	Player	Shoots	Acquired	Place of birth		Finals appearance
2	Jiří Fischer	L	1998	(Czech Republic)	Hořovice, Czechoslovakia	first
5	Nicklas Lidström – A	L	1989	(Sweden)	Krylbo, Sweden	fourth (1995, 1997, 1998)
11	Mathieu Dandenault	R	1994	(Canada)	Sherbrooke, Quebec	third (1997, 1998)
24	Chris Chelios	R	1998–99	(United States)	Chicago, Illinois	fourth (1986, 1989, 1992)
27	Fredrik Olausson	R	2001–02	(Sweden)	Nybro, Sweden	first
28	Steve Duchesne	L	1997–98	(Canada)	Sept-Îles, Quebec	first
71	Jiří Šlégr	L	2001–02	(Czech Republic)	Jihlava, Czechoslovakia	first

Forwards
#	Player	Position	Shoots	Acquired	Place of birth		Finals appearance
8	Igor Larionov	C	L	2000–01	(Russia)	Voskresensk, Soviet Union	third (1997, 1998)
13	Pavel Datsyuk	C	L	1998	(Russia)	Sverdlovsk, Soviet Union	first
14	Brendan Shanahan – A	LW	R	1996–97	(Canada)	Etobicoke, Ontario	third (1997, 1998)
17	Brett Hull	RW	R	2001–02	(United States)	Belleville, Ontario	fourth (1986, 1999, 2000)
18	Kirk Maltby	RW	R	1995–96	(Canada)	Guelph, Ontario	third (1997, 1998)
19	Steve Yzerman – C	C	R	1983	(Canada)	Burnaby, British Columbia	fourth (1995, 1997, 1998)
20	Luc Robitaille	LW	L	2001–02	(Canada)	Montreal, Quebec	second (1993)
21	Boyd Devereaux	LW	L	2000–01	(Canada)	Seaforth, Ontario	first
25	Darren McCarty	RW	R	1992	(Canada)	Burnaby, British Columbia	fourth (1995, 1997, 1998)
29	Jason Williams	RW	R	2000–01	(Canada)	London, Ontario	first (did not play)
33	Kris Draper	C	L	1993–94	(Canada)	Toronto, Ontario	fourth (1995, 1997, 1998)
91	Sergei Fedorov	C	L	1989	(Russia)	Pskov, Soviet Union	fourth (1995, 1997, 1998)
96	Tomas Holmström	LW	L	1994	(Sweden)	Piteå, Sweden	third (1997, 1998)

== Stanley Cup engraving ==
The 2002 Stanley Cup was presented to Red Wings captain Steve Yzerman by NHL Commissioner Gary Bettman following the Red Wings 3–1 win over the Hurricanes in game five.

The following Red Wings players and staff had their names engraved on the Stanley Cup

2001–02 Detroit Red Wings

=== Players ===
Centres

- 8 Igor Larionov
- 13 Pavel Datsyuk
- 19 Steve Yzerman* (Captain)
- 29 Jason Williams*
- 33 Kris Draper
- 91 Sergei Fedorov †

Wingers

- 14 Brendan Shanahan (A)
- 17 Brett Hull
- 18 Kirk Maltby
- 20 Luc Robitaille
- 21 Boyd Devereaux
- 25 Darren McCarty
- 96 Tomas Holmström

Defencemen

- 2 Jiří Fischer
- 5 Nicklas Lidström (A)
- 11 Mathieu Dandenault
- 24 Chris Chelios
- 27 Fredrik Olausson
- 28 Steve Duchesne
- 71 Jiří Šlégr

Goaltenders

- 34 Manny Legace
- 39 Dominik Hašek
- * Played both centre and wing.
- † Played both centre and wing regularly, and occasionally played defence due to emergencies.

=== Coaching and administrative staff ===
- Mike Ilitch Sr. (Owner/President/Governor), Marian Ilitch (Owner/Secretary-Treasurer), Christopher Ilitch (Co-President of Ilitch Holdings/Alt. Governor)
- Denise Ilitch (Co-President of Ilitch Holdings/Alt. Governor), Ronald Ilitch, Michael Ititch Jr. (Minority Owners)
- Lisa Ilitch Murray, Atanas Ilitch, Carole Ilitch Trepeck (Minority Owners), Jim Devellano (Sr. Vice President/Alt. Governor)
- Ken Holland (General Manager), Jim Nill (Asst. General Manager), William Scotty Bowman (Head Coach), Dave Lewis (Associate Coach), Barry Smith (Associate Coach)
- Jim Bedard (Goaltending Consultant), Joey Kocur (Video Coordinator), John Wharton (Athletic Therapist), Piet Van Zant (Asst. Athletic Therapist), Paul Boyer (Equipment Manager)
- Paul MacDonald (Sr. Director of Finance), Nancy Beard (Executive Asst.), Dan Belisle (Director of Scouting), Mark Howe (Scout)
- Bob McCammon (Scout), Hakan Andersson (Director of European Scouting), Bruce Haralson (Scout)
- Mark Leach (Scout), Joe McDonnell (Scout), Glenn Merkosky (Scout)

=== Engraving notes ===
- Manny Legace's name was misspelled MANNY LEGECE with an "E" instead of an "A". An "A" was stamped over the second "E" twice to correct this mistake.
- Steve Yzerman and Brendan Shanahan became the second and third players to win the Olympic Gold Medal in hockey (with team Canada) and the Stanley Cup (with Detroit) in the same year (See 1980 Ken Morrow)
- Chris Chelios and Brett Hull became the first players to win an Olympic Silver medal (with team United States) and the Stanley Cup (with Detroit) in the same year.
- 10 Players (Steve Yzerman, Igor Larionov, Sergei Fedorov, Brendan Shanahan, Kris Draper, Kirk Maltby, Darren McCarty, Tomas Holmström, Nicklas Lidström, & Mathieu Dandenault) won their third Stanley Cup with Detroit.

=== Left off the Stanley Cup, but included in team picture ===
- The players listed below were on the roster during the Finals, but left off the Stanley Cup engraving due to not qualifying (41 regular season games or 1 Finals game for Detroit).
  - #32 Maxim Kuznetsov played in 39 games (2 less than the minimum), but was not dressed in the playoffs. He spent whole season with Detroit.
  - #4 Uwe Krupp (D) – missed 60 games injured, played 8 regular season games, and 2 playoff games
  - #42 Sean Avery (C) – 36 games in minors, 36 games for Detroit
  - #3 Jesse Wallin (D) – 5 games in minors, 15 games for Detroit, missed most of the season injured
  - #15 Ladislav Kohn (RW) – 4 games played, 40 games played in Europe
  - #37 Jason Elliott (G) – was called up from the minors to serve as a practice goalie for Detroit, during the playoffs. Jason Elliot never played a game in the NHL. He retired after 2006–07 season while playing in Germany.
- Detroit wanted to include 30 non players, while still leaving many more non players off. Each NHL team is to dress 20 out a 23 team roster for each games. In 2002 only 22 players' names were added to the Stanley Cup.
- Tim Abbott (Asst. Equipment Manager), Sergei Tchekmarev (Masseur), Rick Szuber (Equipment Assistant) John Remejes (Dressing Room Asst.)
- All 10 players and non-playing personnel in the team picture were awarded the Stanley Cup Rings.

== Broadcasting ==
In Canada, the series was televised in English on CBC. This would end up being the last finals broadcast by SRC, as RDS would pick up the French-language broadcast for the next season.

In the United States, ESPN aired the first two games while ABC broadcast the rest of the series.

Preceded by Colorado Avalanche; 2001	Detroit Red Wings; Stanley Cup champions 2002	Succeeded by New Jersey Devils; 2003
