= Tommy Westlund =

Swedish ice hockey player (born 1974)

- Born: December 29, 1974 (age 51) Fors, Sweden
- Height: 6 ft 0 in (183 cm)
- Weight: 210 lb (95 kg; 15 st 0 lb)
- Position: Right wing
- Shot: Right
- Played for: Brynäs IF; Carolina Hurricanes; Leksands IF
- NHL draft: 93rd overall, 1998; Carolina Hurricanes
- Playing career: 1995–2004

Kjell Tommy Westlund (born December 29, 1974) is a Swedish former professional ice hockey right winger who played four seasons in the National Hockey League from 1999 to 2003 for the Carolina Hurricanes.

== Professional Playing Career ==
Westlund began his career in Sweden's third tier league with Avesta BK. Impressive performances earned him a contract with Brynäs IF of the Elitserien. Westlund was drafted 93rd overall by the Carolina Hurricanes in the 1998 NHL entry draft. After spending a season in the American Hockey League with the Beast of New Haven, he made his NHL debut in 1999. He played 203 career NHL games scoring 9 goals and 13 assists for 22 points. He missed the majority of the 2001-02 season after suffering a back injury during a game against the Columbus Blue Jackets on November 19, 2001. He made a recovery and would go on to play 19 games during the 2002 Stanley Cup Playoffs during Carolina's surprise run to the 2002 Stanley Cup Finals. He would be cross-checked in the mouth by Detroit Red Wings defenseman Jiri Fischer in Game 4 of the championship series, resulting in Fischer being suspended for the deciding Game 5 in Detroit.

Westlund would spend most of the 2002-03 season as a healthy scratch. He returned to Sweden in 2003 with Leksands IF before retiring from hockey. He is currently an Amateur Scout for the Pittsburgh Penguins.

== Career statistics ==
=== Regular season and playoffs ===
			Regular season					Playoffs
Season	Team	League	GP	G	A	Pts	PIM	GP	G	A	Pts	PIM
1991–92	Avesta BK	SWE.3	27	11	9	20	8	—	—	—	—	—
1992–93	Avesta BK	SWE.2	32	9	5	14	32	—	—	—	—	—
1993–94	Avesta BK	SWE.2	31	20	11	31	34	—	—	—	—	—
1994–95	Avesta BK	SWE.2	32	17	13	30	22	—	—	—	—	—
1995–96	Brynäs IF	SEL	18	2	1	3	6	—	—	—	—	—
1995–96	Brynäs IF	Allsv	18	10	10	20	4	8	1	0	1	4
1996–97	Brynäs IF	SEL	50	21	13	34	16	—	—	—	—	—
1997–98	Brynäs IF	SEL	46	29	9	38	45	3	0	1	1	0
1998–99	Beast of New Haven	AHL	50	8	18	26	31	—	—	—	—	—
1999–2000	Carolina Hurricanes	NHL	81	4	8	12	19	—	—	—	—	—
2000–01	Carolina Hurricanes	NHL	79	5	3	8	23	6	0	0	0	17
2001–02	Carolina Hurricanes	NHL	40	0	2	2	6	19	1	0	1	0
2002–03	Carolina Hurricanes	NHL	3	0	0	0	0	—	—	—	—	—
2002–03	Lowell Lock Monsters	AHL	22	1	3	4	12	—	—	—	—	—
2003–04	Leksands IF	SEL	14	3	2	5	6	—	—	—	—	—
SWE.2 totals			95	46	29	75	88	—	—	—	—	—
SEL totals			128	55	25	80	73	3	0	1	1	0
NHL totals			203	9	13	22	48	25	1	0	1	17

=== International ===
Year	Team	Event	GP	G	A	Pts	PIM
1998	Sweden	WC	1	0	0	0	0
