= NHL on ABC ratings =

In the 1992–93 season, ABC televised five weekly playoff telecasts (the first three weeks were regional coverage of various games and two national games) on Sunday afternoons starting on April 18. In the 1993–94 season, ABC televised six weekly regional telecasts on Sunday afternoons beginning in March (or the last three Sundays of the regular season). ABC then televised three weeks worth of playoff games on first three Sundays.

Overall, ABC averaged a 1.7 rating for those two seasons.

== Stanley Cup Finals ==
Year	Teams	Games carried	Rating
2000	New Jersey–Dallas	3–6	3.7
2001	Colorado–New Jersey	3–7	3.3
2002	Detroit–Carolina	3–5	3.6
2003	New Jersey–Anaheim	3–7	2.9
2004	Tampa Bay–Calgary	3–7	2.6
2022	Colorado–Tampa Bay	All games	2.31
2024	Florida–Edmonton	All games	2.09
2026	Carolina–Vegas	All games	2.53

== Regular season ==
Season	Number of dates	Rating
1993-94	6	1.7
1999–2000	4	1.3
2000–01	5	1.1
2001–02	5	1.4
2002–03	5	1.1
2003–04	5	1.1
2021–22	10	0.45
2022–23	9	TBD
2023–24	11	TBD

== All-Star Game ==
Year	Rating
2000	2.7
2001	1.7
2002	1.8
2003	1.7
2004	1.8
2022	0.6
2023	1.0
2024	0.7
