= Varsity Arena =

Indoor arena at the University of Toronto St. George

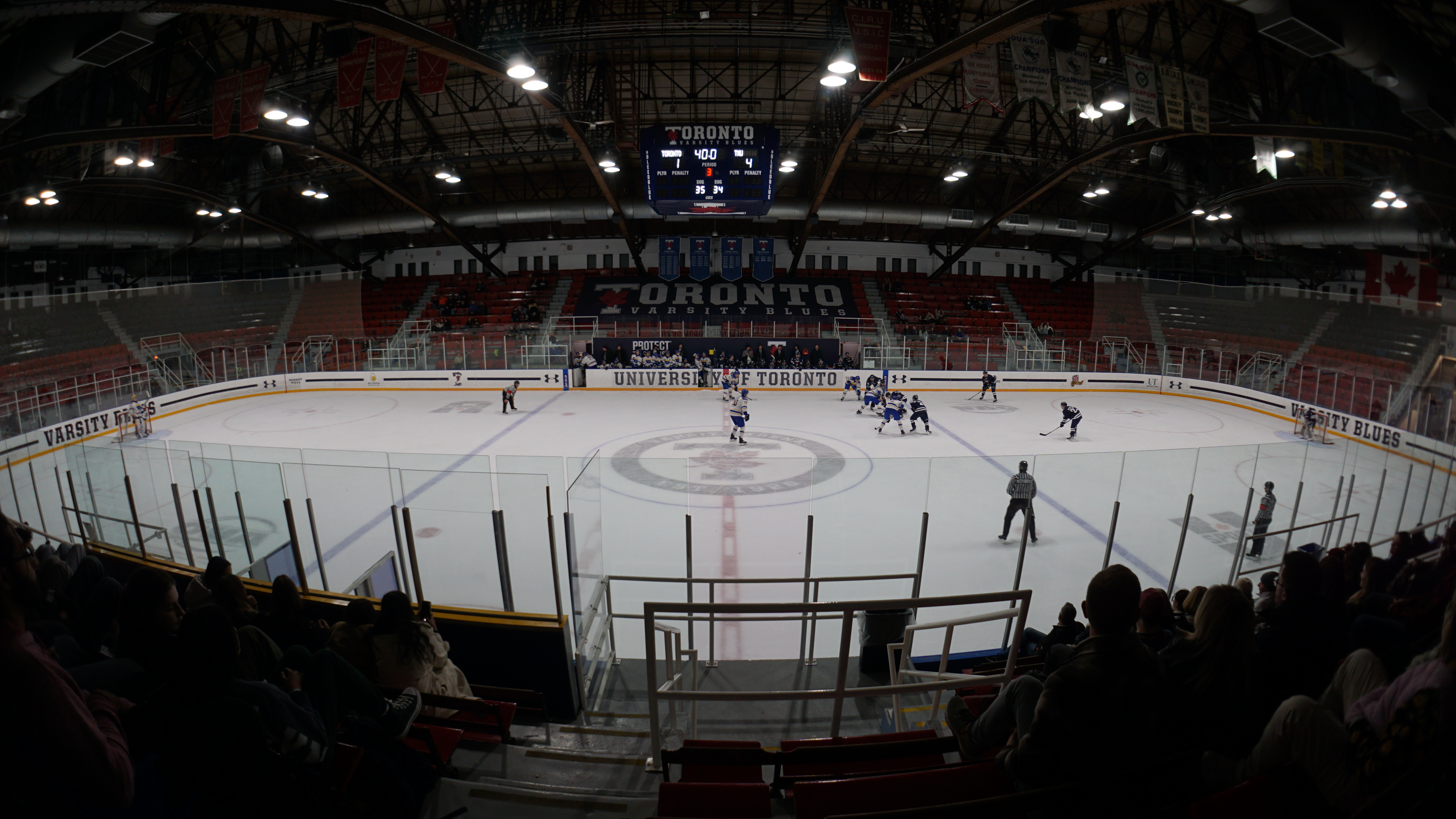
- Interior view of the arena in 2025
- Interactive map of Varsity Arena
- Address: 299 Bloor Street West; Toronto, Ontario; Canada
- Location: University of Toronto St. George
- Coordinates: 43°40′01.5″N 79°23′46″W
- Owner: University of Toronto
- Operator: University of Toronto
- Capacity: 4,116
- Type: Ice hockey arena
- Current use: Ice hockey
- Public transit: at St. George

Construction
- Opened: December 17, 1926
- Cost: $61.7 million
- Architect: Professor T. R. Loudon
- Main contractor: Messers. Pearson and Darling

Tenants
- Toronto Varsity Blues (U Sports) teams: men's and women's ice hockey (1926–present); Toronto Toros (WHA) (1973–1974); Toronto Tornados (CBA) (1983–1985); Toronto Planets (RHI) (1993)

Website
- utoronto.ca/varsity-arena

Varsity Arena is an indoor arena of the University of Toronto located at the "Varsity Centre & Arena", a sports complex on its St. George campus that also includes Varsity Stadium. It is located on the northern edge of the campus in Toronto, Ontario, Canada. Opened on December 17, 1926, the arena is primarily home to the Toronto Varsity Blues men's and women's ice hockey teams.

Varsity Arena also hosted the Toronto Toros of the WHA from 1973 to 1974 and the Toronto Planets of the RHI in 1993.

== Overview ==
One of the first indoor arenas to be built without pillars in the seating area blocking the line of sight, Varsity Arena sat close to 4,800 in double wooden chairs at the time of its construction. It was designed by Professor T. R. Loudon along with architects Messers. Pearson and Darling and had an interior volume of 151,595 cubic metres (5,353,500 cu ft). Originally the floor under the ice surface consisted of iron pipes covered in sand.

The seating capacity was reduced to 4,116 by renovations in 1985–86, which expanded the ice sheet to professional standards and eliminated fire code violations that had been found in 1977. The current gross floor area is 6,560.03 square metres (70,611.6 sq ft).

It is also the home of the University of Toronto Intramural hockey league, which comprises (as of the Winter term of 2006) of 46 men's and eight women's teams of varying skill levels (from recreational to near-varsity calibre) competing in six men's and two women's divisions.

Prior to 2009, the university also used the arena to host examinations.

The first goal in the arena was scored by future NHL player Dave Trottier of the Varsity Grads in a two-period exhibition game against the Varsity Blues on opening night.
