= Manny Legace =

Canadian ice hockey player (born 1973)

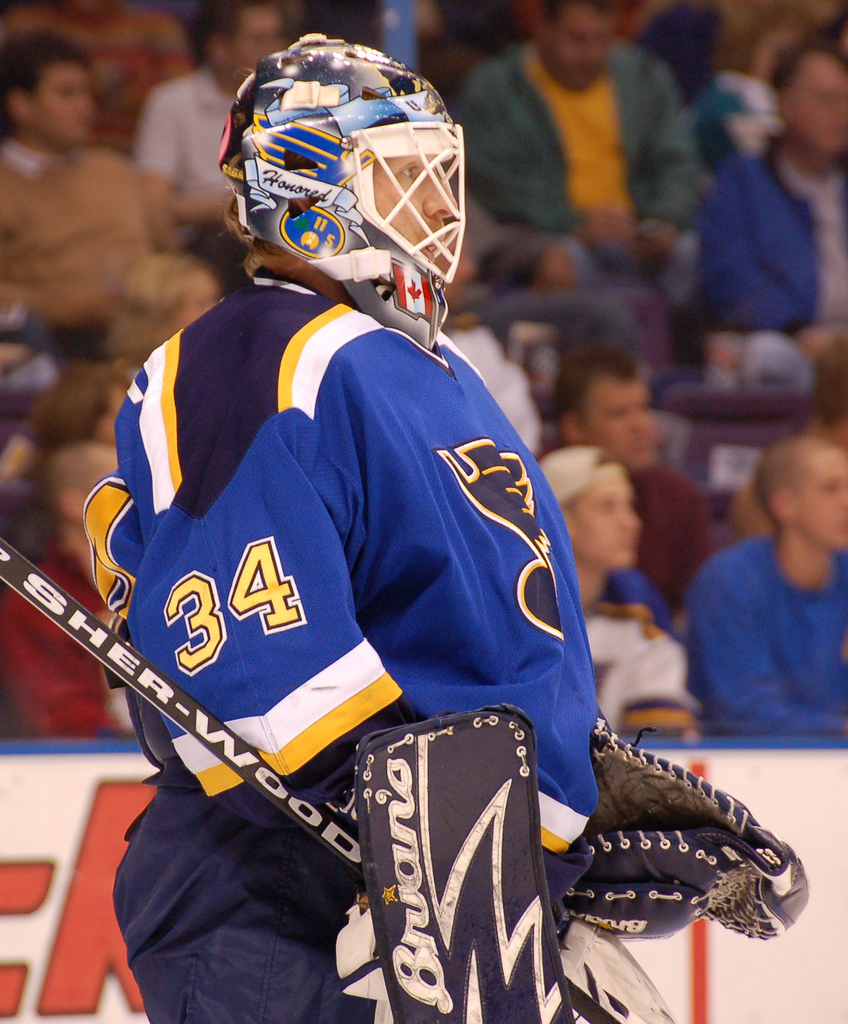
- Legace with the St. Louis Blues in 2006
- Born: February 4, 1973 (age 53) Toronto, Ontario, Canada
- Height: 5 ft 9 in (175 cm)
- Weight: 200 lb (91 kg; 14 st 4 lb)
- Position: Goaltender
- Caught: Left
- Played for: Los Angeles Kings; Detroit Red Wings; St. Louis Blues; Carolina Hurricanes; Iserlohn Roosters
- National team: Canada
- NHL draft: 188th overall, 1993; Hartford Whalers
- Playing career: 1994–2012

Emmanuel Legace (born February 4, 1973) is a Canadian former professional ice hockey goaltender, who played most notably in the National Hockey League for the Detroit Red Wings, and later the St. Louis Blues between 1998 and 2010. Legace also enjoyed spells with the Los Angeles Kings, Carolina Hurricanes, and Iserlohn Roosters of the DEL. He finished his playing career for the Springfield Falcons of the American Hockey League, for whom he is the career leader in goaltending wins. Legace is the former goaltending coach for the NHL's Columbus Blue Jackets.

Legace was born in Toronto, Ontario, but grew up in Alliston, Ontario.

== Playing career ==
As a youth, Legace played in the 1987 Quebec International Pee-Wee Hockey Tournament with a minor ice hockey team from Don Mills.

Prior to being selected by the Whalers, Legace played in the Ontario Hockey League with the Niagara Falls Thunder and in Roller Hockey International for the Toronto Planets. Legace spent the 1993–1994 season as a member of the Canadian National Team and played in sixteen games.

From there, Legace spent a lengthy apprenticeship in the minor leagues, largely for the Springfield Falcons, between 1994–98. He was a star with Springfield, garnering First Team All-Star honors and the AHL's leading goaltender award in 1996.

He also played a brief stint for the ECHL's Richmond Renegades in 1996–97 and for the IHL's Las Vegas Thunder in 1997–98. On July 31, 1998, the Carolina Hurricanes traded Legace to the Los Angeles Kings for a conditional draft pick in the 1999 NHL entry draft.

Although he spent most of the 1999 season with the IHL Long Beach Ice Dogs, Legace got his first NHL start with the Kings. While he played well in limited action for Los Angeles, he signed with Detroit on July 15, 1999. However, since the Red Wings had both Chris Osgood and Ken Wregget as veteran goaltenders, Legace was left unprotected on waivers. He was then claimed by the Vancouver Canucks on September 29, 1999. Yet almost two weeks later, on October 13, 1999, Legace was reacquired by the Red Wings from the waiver wire when the Canucks in turn left him unprotected. While Legace spent most of his time playing for the IHL's Manitoba Moose, he did get some action while playing for the Red Wings, posting a perfect 4–0–0 record.

=== Detroit Red Wings ===
In training camp the next season, Legace beat out Wregget to establish himself as the backup goaltender to Chris Osgood. Osgood had a very slow start, and Legace subsequently saw much action. Posting a 24–5–5 record in 39 games, Legace looked to have assumed the starting role for the team. However, Osgood regained his stride and resumed starting duties in the playoffs.

With the 2001–02 season, Legace became backup to Dominik Hašek when Osgood was waived and claimed by the New York Islanders. Legace played in 20 games and only saw playoff action to relieve Hašek during game three of the semifinals of the 2002 Stanley Cup playoffs to the St. Louis Blues; the Red Wings won the Stanley Cup that season.

The next season, with the retirement of Hašek and the signing of star goaltender Curtis Joseph, Legace saw his workload increase from 20 games to 25 games in the 2002–03 season, yet remained the team's backup.

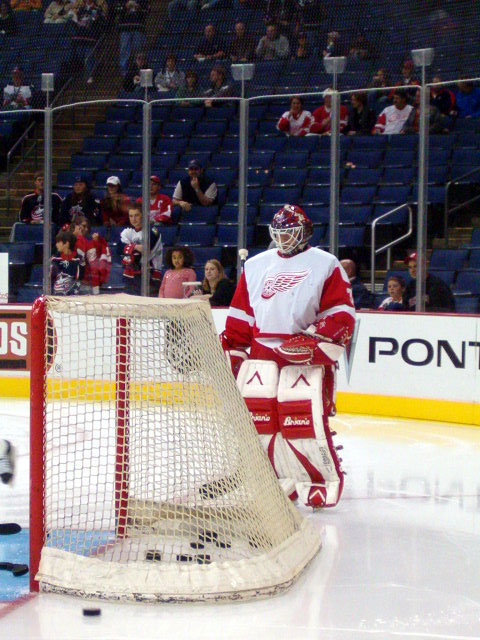
Manny Legace during warmups while with the Detroit Red Wings.

At the start of the 2003–04 season, Hašek made the startling decision to come out of retirement and return to the Red Wings. Curtis Joseph was still being paid $8 million a year and, due to his hefty contract, was not likely to be traded or picked up by a team. While Legace was initially going to be the 3rd goalie behind two elite goaltenders, the Red Wings opted to send Joseph to the minors while Legace served as Hašek's backup. Hašek, however, was not properly conditioned for a return to the NHL. Minor injuries and inconsistent play from Hašek thrust Legace into the starting role. Injuries to both Hašek and Legace opened the door for the Red Wings to call up Joseph from the minors, along with Joey MacDonald to serve as his backup. When Legace returned from injury, MacDonald was sent back to the minors while Legace and Joseph ended up serving as Detroit's goaltending tandem for the remainder of the season, as Hašek opted not to return to the team from injury. An injury to Joseph late in the season found Legace temporarily working with minor-league goaltender Marc Lamothe, but Lamothe was returned to the AHL's Grand Rapids Griffins when Joseph returned to the roster.

Due to Legace's strong play during the regular season, he was announced as Detroit's starting goaltender for the start of the 2004 Stanley Cup Playoffs. The Red Wings faced the Nashville Predators in the opening round of the 2004 playoffs. While Legace won the first two games, he did not perform up to team expectations and was pulled in the middle of the fourth game in favor of Joseph, who ended up backstopping for the remainder of the series. The Red Wings won the series but lost the next series against the Calgary Flames.

Legace briefly played in Russia during the 2004–05 NHL lockout, but eventually sat the rest of the season out, preferring to be close to his family in the States. Legace was the NHLPA Representative for the Detroit Red Wings until 2005, when the role was assumed by Nicklas Lidström. Legace has since become a vocal critic of both the league and the players' union, especially in regard to how both sides handled the 2004–05 NHL lockout.

For the 2005–06 season, Chris Osgood was re-signed by the Red Wings to compete with Legace for the starting job. However, due to Osgood's injuries and general lack of conditioning, Legace was awarded the starting goaltender role for the Detroit Red Wings. By October 2005 with the Red Wings defeating the Chicago Blackhawks 5–2, Legace set the record for the most wins by a goaltender in the month of October (10–1).

He would finish the regular season with a record of 37–8–3, helping lead the Red Wings to the Presidents' Trophy as the NHL's best regular season team by far.

=== St. Louis Blues ===
Prior to Detroit's elimination from the 2006 playoffs, Legace indicated to the media that if Detroit failed to win the opening round of the playoffs, he would not be returning to the team. The Red Wings fell to the Edmonton Oilers in six games. On June 10, 2006, Red Wings general manager Ken Holland announced that Legace would not be offered a contract, thus making him a free agent. Legace signed a one-year contract with Wings' division-rivals, the St. Louis Blues on August 8, 2006. In his first season with the Blues Legace played in 45 games, posting a 23–15–5 record. His season was cut short due to a mid-season concussion and season-ending knee surgery, but his play was solid enough to earn him a two-year contract extension with the Blues on February 24, 2007.

Legace enjoyed success with St. Louis in the 2007–08 season, and was named to the 2008 NHL All-Star Game. Despite Legace's numbers, the Blues failed to qualify for the playoffs for the third consecutive season. In the 2008–09 season, Legace shared starting duties with Chris Mason to begin the season. After failing to repeat his previous season efforts the Blues placed Legace on waivers on February 6, 2009. Legace was then demoted to the team's AHL affiliate Peoria Rivermen for the remainder of the season and helped the Rivermen reach the playoffs. Manny admitted later that there was animosity between him and the Blues management.

=== Carolina Hurricanes ===
On November 9, 2009, Legace signed a one-year contract with the Carolina Hurricanes. The two-way deal paid Legace $500,000 to play in the NHL level and $105,000 to play at the AHL level. His first game with the Carolina Hurricanes was on November 11, 2009, against the Los Angeles Kings, where they fell 5–2 in Raleigh at the RBC Center.

=== Later years ===
On September 26, 2010, the New York Islanders announced they signed Legace to a PTO. he was released a few weeks later. For the remainder of the 2010–11 season, Legace played in the Deutsche Eishockey Liga (DEL) in Germany for the Iserlohn Roosters, with whom he had a one-year contract.

During the 2011 pre-season, Legace made two exhibition appearances for the Vancouver Canucks on a Professional Tryout basis before being released by the team on September 23. A week later, on September 30, 2011, Legace signed a Professional Tryout contract (PTO) with the San Antonio Rampage of the AHL, the minor league affiliate of the Florida Panthers of the National Hockey League. Legace started for the Rampage for the first game of the season vs. the Chicago Wolves, but after approximately 10 minutes he was plowed into by Chicago forward Mike Duco, resulting in an undisclosed leg injury. He would not return to the ice for San Antonio again. On October 20, 2011, he signed a Professional Tryout contract (PTO) with the Springfield Falcons, the minor league affiliate of the Columbus Blue Jackets and the team he played for in the mid-1990s. Legace finished his career as the backup goaltender in Springfield, after which he briefly served as an intern in the Columbus front office.

== Retirement ==
=== Broadcasting ===
On October 25, 2013, it was announced that Legace had also joined Fox Sports Detroit as a college hockey analyst.

=== Goaltending coaching ===
On November 14, 2012, Legace accepted the position of goaltender coach for the Muskegon Lumberjacks of the United States Hockey League. After two seasons he joined the Springfield Falcons coaching staff on a full-time basis, serving originally as a goaltending coach before moving into a team consultancy role.

In 2018, Legace became goaltending coach for the Columbus Blue Jackets, a promotion from the same role held with the Blue Jackets' minor league affiliates, the Cleveland Monsters. Legace was relieved of his duties on April 15, 2023, along with head coach Brad Larsen, after the team failed to qualify for the post season and finished with a 25-48-9 record.

== Personal life ==
Legace resides in Novi, Michigan. He has one daughter, Sabrina, and a son, Manny.

On July 4, 2021, Columbus Blue Jackets goaltender Matiss Kivlenieks died from chest trauma caused by a mortar firework explosion at Legace’s home in Novi.

== International play ==
Medal record

Representing Canada

Ice hockey

Olympic Games
Silver medal – second place	1994 Lillehammer	

World Junior Championships
Gold medal – first place	1993 Sweden	

Legace was the starting goaltender for Canada at the 1993 World Junior Ice Hockey Championships, where he won a gold medal and was named to the All-Star team.

Legace was named to Team Canada for the 1994 Winter Olympics, where he served as a backup goalie, and won a silver medal.

== Awards ==
- Won a silver medal at the 1994 Winter Olympics
- Member of the 2002 Stanley Cup championship winning Detroit Red Wings
- 2008 All-Star Game

== Career statistics ==
=== Regular season and playoffs ===
			Regular season										Playoffs
Season	Team	League	GP	W	L	T	OTL	MIN	GA	SO	GAA	SV%	GP	W	L	MIN	GA	SO	GAA	SV%
1987–88	Alliston Hornets	GMOJHL	16	7	9	0	—	960	83	0	5.17	—	—	—	—	—	—	—	—	—
1988–89	Vaughan Raiders	COJHL	23	—	—	—	—	1303	92	1	4.24	—	—	—	—	—	—	—	—	—
1989–90	Vaughan Raiders	MetJHL	21	8	11	1	—	1180	89	1	4.53	—	—	—	—	—	—	—	—	—
1989–90	Thornhill Thunderbirds	MetJHL	8	3	3	2	—	480	30	0	3.75	—	—	—	—	—	—	—	—	—
1990–91	Niagara Falls Thunder	OHL	30	13	11	2	—	1515	107	0	4.24	.869	4	1	1	119	10	0	5.04	—
1991–92	Niagara Falls Thunder	OHL	43	21	16	3	—	2384	143	0	3.60	.879	14	8	5	791	56	0	4.25	—
1992–93	Niagara Falls Thunder	OHL	48	22	19	3	—	2630	171	0	3.90	—	4	0	4	240	18	0	4.50	—
1993–94	Canadian National Team	Intl	16	8	6	0	—	859	36	2	2.51	—	—	—	—	—	—	—	—	—
1994–95	Springfield Falcons	AHL	39	12	17	6	—	2169	128	2	3.54	.887	—	—	—	—	—	—	—	—
1995–96	Springfield Falcons	AHL	37	20	12	4	—	2196	83	5	2.27	.917	4	1	3	220	18	0	4.91	.854
1996–97	Richmond Renegades	ECHL	3	2	1	0	—	157	8	0	3.05	.869	—	—	—	—	—	—	—	—
1996–97	Springfield Falcons	AHL	36	17	14	5	—	2119	107	1	3.03	.897	12	9	3	745	25	2	2.01	.931
1997–98	Springfield Falcons	AHL	6	4	2	0	—	345	16	0	2.78	.889	—	—	—	—	—	—	—	—
1997–98	Las Vegas Thunder	IHL	41	18	16	4	—	2106	111	1	3.16	.911	4	1	3	237	16	0	4.05	.887
1998–99	Los Angeles Kings	NHL	17	2	9	2	—	898	39	0	2.60	.911	—	—	—	—	—	—	—	—
1998–99	Long Beach Ice Dogs	IHL	33	22	8	1	—	1796	67	2	2.24	.912	6	4	2	338	9	0	1.60	.944
1999–00	Manitoba Moose	IHL	42	17	18	5	—	2409	104	2	2.59	.913	2	0	2	141	7	0	2.97	.879
1999–00	Detroit Red Wings	NHL	4	4	0	0	—	239	11	0	2.75	.906	—	—	—	—	—	—	—	—
2000–01	Detroit Red Wings	NHL	39	24	5	5	—	2136	73	2	2.05	.920	—	—	—	—	—	—	—	—
2001–02	Detroit Red Wings	NHL	20	10	6	2	—	1117	45	1	2.42	.911	1	0	0	11	1	0	5.68	.500
2002–03	Detroit Red Wings	NHL	25	14	5	4	—	1405	51	0	2.18	.925	—	—	—	—	—	—	—	—
2003–04	Detroit Red Wings	NHL	41	23	10	5	—	2325	82	3	2.12	.920	4	2	2	220	8	0	2.18	.905
2004–05	Khimik Voskresensk	RSL	2	0	1	0	—	89	10	0	6.73	.778	—	—	—	—	—	—	—	—
2005–06	Detroit Red Wings	NHL	51	37	8	—	3	2905	106	7	2.19	.915	6	2	4	408	18	0	2.65	.884
2005–06	Grand Rapids Griffins	AHL	1	1	0	—	0	60	2	0	2.00	.909	—	—	—	—	—	—	—	—
2006–07	St. Louis Blues	NHL	45	23	15	—	5	2521	109	5	2.59	.907	—	—	—	—	—	—	—	—
2007–08	St. Louis Blues	NHL	66	27	25	—	8	3665	147	5	2.41	.911	—	—	—	—	—	—	—	—
2008–09	St. Louis Blues	NHL	29	13	9	—	2	1452	77	0	3.18	.885	—	—	—	—	—	—	—	—
2008–09	Peoria Rivermen	AHL	23	14	7	—	1	1290	43	3	2.00	.935	7	3	4	429	18	0	2.52	.899
2009–10	Carolina Hurricanes	NHL	28	10	7	—	5	1472	69	1	2.81	.907	—	—	—	—	—	—	—	—
2010–11	Iserlohn Roosters	DEL	40	17	22	—	0	2322	97	3	2.51	.919	—	—	—	—	—	—	—	—
2011–12	San Antonio Rampage	AHL	1	0	0	—	0	20	1	0	3.00	.875	—	—	—	—	—	—	—	—
2011–12	Springfield Falcons	AHL	35	14	18	—	1	1882	85	0	2.71	.907	—	—	—	—	—	—	—	—
NHL totals			365	187	99	18	23	20,140	809	24	2.41	.912	11	4	6	639	27	0	2.54	.888

=== International ===
Year	Team	Event	GP	W	L	T	MIN	GA	SO	GAA	SV%
1993	Canada	WJC	6	6	0	0	360	10	1	1.67	—
Junior totals			6	6	0	0	360	10	1	1.67	—

Awards and achievements
Preceded by Jim Carey	Aldege "Baz" Bastien Memorial Award; 1995–96	Succeeded by Jean-François Labbé
