= Boyd Devereaux =

Canadian ice hockey player (born 1978)

- Born: April 16, 1978 (age 48) Seaforth, Ontario, Canada
- Height: 6 ft 2 in (188 cm)
- Weight: 195 lb (88 kg; 13 st 13 lb)
- Position: Centre
- Shot: Left
- Played for: Edmonton Oilers; Detroit Red Wings; Phoenix Coyotes; Toronto Maple Leafs; HC Lugano
- NHL draft: 6th overall, 1996; Edmonton Oilers
- Playing career: 1997–2010

Boyd Fletcher Devereaux (born April 16, 1978) is a Canadian former professional ice hockey player.

Drafted 6th overall in the 1996 NHL Draft by the Edmonton Oilers, Devereaux is best known for forming 1/3 of the "Two Kids and a Goat" line as a member of the Detroit Red Wings, alongside Pavel Datsyuk and Brett Hull, ultimately culminating in the 2002 Stanley Cup championship.

== Playing career ==
Devereaux spent his junior hockey career playing for the Kitchener Rangers of the Ontario Hockey League (OHL). He was drafted sixth overall by the Edmonton Oilers in the 1996 NHL entry draft and would go on to play 627 career NHL games, scoring 67 goals and 112 assists for 179 points.

In the summer of 2000, Devereaux signed with the Detroit Red Wings, with whom he won the Stanley Cup in 2002. In 2004, he signed with the Phoenix Coyotes, where he played for one season. In October 2006, after failing to make the Red Wings roster on a tryout basis, the Toronto Maple Leafs signed him. He began the season in the American Hockey League with the Toronto Marlies but quickly worked his way back to the NHL. After a season and a half with the Maple Leafs, Devereaux cleared waivers and was sent back to the Marlies for the 2008-09 season.

On February 14, 2009, Devereaux was recalled to play for the Maple Leafs again after he was put on re-entry waivers and no other team opted to claim him. In the final game of the season, against the Ottawa Senators, Devereaux recorded his second career hat trick, scoring all three goals against Brian Elliott.

The Maple Leafs did not re-sign Devereaux, who then went to play with HC Lugano in the Swiss NLA for the 2009-10 season. While competing in the Spengler Cup in Switzerland on 28 December 2009, Devereaux was collecting a loose puck from the offensive zone when he was caught with his head down and checked by HC Davos defenceman Beat Forster. After being helped from the ice, Devereaux noticed tingling sensations in his limbs and was rushed to hospital. X-rays revealed fractured vertebra. After an MRI, it was decided by the medical staff that surgery was not an option, and that the best course of action was to allow the break to attempt to heal on its own. Devereaux's neck was braced and he was allowed home. He eventually contacted the Leafs' medical staff and had surgery for his neck injury, but never returned to play hockey.

== International play ==
Medal record

Representing Canada

Ice hockey

World Junior Championships
Gold medal – first place	1997 Switzerland	

Devereaux was named to the 1997 World Junior team representing Canada. He scored four goals during the tournament including the game-winning goal during the semifinals where Canada beat Russia 3–2, and the game-winning goal during the team's 2–0 victory in the gold-medal game against the United States. The gold medal was Canada's fifth straight at the tournament.

== Personal life ==
Devereaux now resides in Waterloo, Ontario, with his wife and two kids.

Devereaux participated in the 2011 season of Battle of the Blades, a figure skating competition broadcast in Canada on CBC Television. He and his partner finished in third place.

== Career statistics ==
=== Regular season and playoffs ===
			Regular season					Playoffs
Season	Team	League	GP	G	A	Pts	PIM	GP	G	A	Pts	PIM
1993–94	Stratford Cullitons	MWJHL	46	12	27	39	8	—	—	—	—	—
1994–95	Stratford Cullitons	MWJHL	45	31	74	105	21	—	—	—	—	—
1995–96	Kitchener Rangers	OHL	66	20	38	58	33	12	3	7	10	4
1996–97	Kitchener Rangers	OHL	54	28	41	69	37	13	4	11	15	8
1996–97	Hamilton Bulldogs	AHL	—	—	—	—	—	1	0	1	1	0
1997–98	Hamilton Bulldogs	AHL	14	5	6	11	6	9	1	1	2	8
1997–98	Edmonton Oilers	NHL	38	1	4	5	6	—	—	—	—	—
1998–99	Hamilton Bulldogs	AHL	7	4	6	10	2	8	0	3	3	4
1998–99	Edmonton Oilers	NHL	61	6	8	14	23	1	0	0	0	0
1999–00	Edmonton Oilers	NHL	76	8	19	27	20	—	—	—	—	—
2000–01	Detroit Red Wings	NHL	55	5	6	11	14	2	0	0	0	0
2001–02	Detroit Red Wings	NHL	79	9	16	25	24	21	2	4	6	4
2002–03	Detroit Red Wings	NHL	61	3	9	12	16	—	—	—	—	—
2003–04	Detroit Red Wings	NHL	61	6	9	15	20	3	1	0	1	0
2005–06	Phoenix Coyotes	NHL	78	8	14	22	44	—	—	—	—	—
2006–07	Toronto Marlies	AHL	30	6	8	14	14	—	—	—	—	—
2006–07	Toronto Maple Leafs	NHL	33	8	11	19	12	—	—	—	—	—
2007–08	Toronto Maple Leafs	NHL	62	7	11	18	24	—	—	—	—	—
2008–09	Toronto Marlies	AHL	45	9	7	16	14	—	—	—	—	—
2008–09	Toronto Maple Leafs	NHL	23	6	5	11	2	—	—	—	—	—
2009–10	HC Lugano	NLA	16	2	2	4	8	—	—	—	—	—
NHL totals			627	67	112	179	205	27	3	4	7	4

=== International ===
Year	Team	Event	Result	GP	G	A	Pts	PIM
1997	Canada	WJC	1st place, gold medalist(s)	7	4	0	4	0
Junior totals				7	4	0	4	0

== Awards and honours ==
Award	Year
OHL
Bobby Smith Trophy	1996
CHL Scholastic Player of the Year	1996
NHL
Stanley Cup (Detroit Red Wings)	2002

Awards and achievements
Preceded by Steve Kelly	Edmonton Oilers first-round draft pick 1996 (first of two)	Succeeded by Matthieu Descoteaux
