= Jiří Šlégr =

Czech ice hockey player (born 1971)

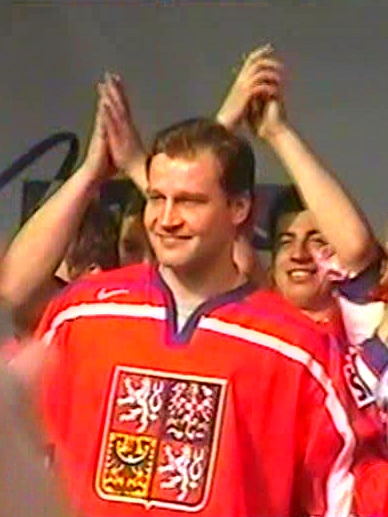
- Born: 30 May 1971 (age 55) Jihlava, Czechoslovakia
- Height: 6 ft 1 in (185 cm)
- Weight: 210 lb (95 kg; 15 st 0 lb)
- Position: Defence
- Shot: Left
- Played for: HC Litvínov; Vancouver Canucks; Edmonton Oilers; Södertälje SK; Pittsburgh Penguins; Atlanta Thrashers; Detroit Red Wings; Avangard Omsk; Boston Bruins; EHC Biel
- National team: Czechoslovakia and Czech Republic
- NHL draft: 23rd overall, 1990; Vancouver Canucks
- Playing career: 1988–2015

Jiří Šlégr (Czech pronunciation: [ˈjɪr̝iː ˈʃlɛːɡr̩]; born 30 May 1971) is a Czech professional ice hockey executive and player who is the general manager of the Czech men's national team. Playing as a defenceman, he was a member of the 2001–02 Detroit Red Wings that won the 2002 Stanley Cup after he was acquired in a late-season trade. Šlégr was inducted into the Czech Ice Hockey Hall of Fame on 12 December 2019.

In 2010, Šlégr, a candidate of the Czech Social Democratic Party, was elected into the Chamber of Deputies of the Parliament of the Czech Republic.

== Playing career ==
Šlégr was drafted 23rd overall by the Vancouver Canucks in the 1990 NHL entry draft. Šlégr played parts of three seasons with the Canucks, before being traded to the Edmonton Oilers for Roman Oksiuta, where he played for parts of two seasons. He spent the 1996–97 season playing in Södertälje SK in Sweden. He then returned to the NHL, where he had been traded to the Pittsburgh Penguins for a third-round draft pick, and played three and a half seasons there, wearing number 71 that would later be more associated with Evgeni Malkin. In January 2001, he was traded to the Atlanta Thrashers for a third-round draft pick. Atlanta traded Šlégr to the Detroit Red Wings for Yuri Butsayev and a third-round draft pick in March 2002 and won the Stanley Cup with the Red Wings that season.

He signed as a free agent with Vancouver in September 2003, but was traded to the Boston Bruins in January 2004 for a conditional pick after falling out of favor with Vancouver Canucks coach Marc Crawford. Šlégr spent the 2004–05 NHL lockout season with HC Litvínov in the Czech Republic before returning to the Boston Bruins for the 2005–06 season. After leaving the NHL, Šlégr returned to the Czech Republic to play for HC Litvínov, and for EHC Biel of the NLA during the 2007 playoffs.

== International play ==
Medal record

Men's ice hockey

Representing Czechoslovakia

Olympic Games
Bronze medal – third place	1992 Albertville	

World Junior Championships
Bronze medal – third place	1990 Canada	
Bronze medal – third place	1991 Finland	

Representing the Czech Republic

Winter Olympics
Gold medal – first place	1998 Nagano	

World Cup
Bronze medal – third place	2004 World Cup	

World Championships
Gold medal – first place	2005 Austria	
Bronze medal – third place	1997 Finland	
Bronze medal – third place	1998 Switzerland	

Šlégr won a gold medal in the 2005 World Championships and the 1998 Winter Olympics with the Czech Republic, and a bronze medal in the 1992 Winter Olympics as member of Czechoslovakia. Along with the Stanley Cup he won with the Detroit Red Wings in 2002, Šlégr won all three major trophies in ice hockey, gaining entry to the Triple Gold Club.

== Political career ==
In the 2010 elections, Šlégr was elected into the Chamber of Deputies as a candidate of the Czech Social Democratic Party in the Ústecký kraj, a region in northern Bohemia. Although the Social Democrats won the elections, they found themselves isolated and a right-wing government led by Petr Nečas was formed instead, forcing the Social Democratic Chairman, Jiří Paroubek, to resign. Šlégr, loyal to Paroubek, followed the former chairman in 2011 when he left the Social Democrats and founded a new party, the National Socialists – 21st Century Left. Since he had refused to resign, Šlégr remained in the Parliament as an unaffiliated MP.

Šlégr announced on June 14, 2013 that he was "going back to the clean environment among athletes" and stepped down from his position.

== Return to hockey ==
At 42 years of age, Šlégr returned to play two more seasons for Litvínov, finally retiring for good as a player in 2015. In his last season, he also served as the team's assistant coach, which began a transition into an off-ice career. He would serve as Litvínov's head coach, general manager and club president before leaving in 2020.

On 10 October 2024, Šlégr was named the new general manager of the Czech men's national team. He replaced former teammate Petr Nedvěd, who had resigned due to family reasons.

== Personal life ==
He is the estranged son of former Vancouver Canucks defenceman Jiří Bubla. He legally changed his surname from Bubla to his stepfather's surname Šlégr as a child.

Šlégr was married for 15 years to Kateřina Šlégrová. The couple split in November 2010 and divorced in February 2013. Šlégr married Lucie Králová in May 2015.

== Career statistics ==
=== Regular season and playoffs ===
			Regular season					Playoffs
Season	Team	League	GP	G	A	Pts	PIM	GP	G	A	Pts	PIM
1985–86	TJ CHZ Litvínov	CSR U16	36	3	13	16	12	—	—	—	—	—
1986–87	TJ CHZ Litvínov	CSR U16	36	18	27	45	38	—	—	—	—	—
1987–88	TJ CHZ Litvínov	CSR U18	—	—	—	—	—	—	—	—	—	—
1987–88	TJ CHZ Litvínov	CSR	4	1	1	2	0	—	—	—	—	—
1988–89	TJ CHZ Litvínov	CSR U18	—	—	—	—	—	—	—	—	—	—
1988–89	TJ CHZ Litvínov	CSR	8	0	0	0	4	—	—	—	—	—
1989–90	TJ CHZ Litvínov	CSR U18	—	—	—	—	—	—	—	—	—	—
1989–90	TJ CHZ Litvínov	CSR	51	4	15	19	—	—	—	—	—	—
1990–91	HC CHZ Litvínov	CSR	47	11	36	47	26	—	—	—	—	—
1991–92	HC Chemopetrol Litvínov	CSR	42	9	23	32	46	—	—	—	—	—
1992–93	Vancouver Canucks	NHL	41	4	22	26	109	5	0	3	3	4
1992–93	Hamilton Canucks	AHL	21	4	14	18	42	—	—	—	—	—
1993–94	Vancouver Canucks	NHL	78	5	33	38	86	—	—	—	—	—
1994–95	HC Litvínov, s.r.o.	ELH	13	3	10	13	0	—	—	—	—	—
1994–95	Vancouver Canucks	NHL	19	1	5	6	32	—	—	—	—	—
1994–95	Edmonton Oilers	NHL	12	1	5	6	14	—	—	—	—	—
1995–96	Edmonton Oilers	NHL	57	4	13	17	74	—	—	—	—	—
1995–96	Cape Breton Oilers	AHL	4	1	2	3	4	—	—	—	—	—
1996–97	Södertälje SK	SHL	30	4	14	18	62	10	4	2	6	32
1996–97	HC Chemopetrol, a.s.	ELH	1	0	0	0	0	—	—	—	—	—
1996–97	HC Becherovka Karlovy Vary	CZE II	5	1	3	4	—	—	—	—	—	—
1997–98	Pittsburgh Penguins	NHL	73	5	12	17	109	6	0	4	4	2
1998–99	Pittsburgh Penguins	NHL	63	3	20	23	86	13	1	3	4	12
1999–2000	Pittsburgh Penguins	NHL	74	11	20	31	82	10	2	3	5	19
2000–01	Pittsburgh Penguins	NHL	42	5	10	15	60	—	—	—	—	—
2000–01	Atlanta Thrashers	NHL	33	3	16	19	36	—	—	—	—	—
2001–02	Atlanta Thrashers	NHL	38	3	5	8	51	—	—	—	—	—
2001–02	Detroit Red Wings	NHL	8	0	1	1	8	1	0	0	0	2
2002–03	HC Chemopetrol, a.s.	ELH	10	2	3	5	14	—	—	—	—	—
2002–03	Avangard Omsk	RSL	6	1	2	3	8	9	0	3	3	45
2003–04	Vancouver Canucks	NHL	16	2	5	7	8	—	—	—	—	—
2003–04	Boston Bruins	NHL	36	4	15	19	27	7	1	1	2	0
2004–05	HC Chemopetrol, a.s.	ELH	46	6	23	29	135	6	1	2	3	30
2005–06	Boston Bruins	NHL	32	5	11	16	56	—	—	—	—	—
2006–07	HC Chemopetrol, a.s.	ELH	41	8	8	16	134	—	—	—	—	—
2006–07	EHC Biel	NLA	—	—	—	—	—	2	2	2	4	8
2007–08	HC Litvínov	ELH	45	7	6	13	121	5	1	1	2	22
2008–09	HC Litvínov	ELH	48	5	26	31	98	3	0	0	0	4
2009–10	HC BENZINA Litvínov	ELH	11	2	0	2	39	1	0	0	0	4
2013–14	HC Verva Litvínov	ELH	28	2	6	8	52	—	—	—	—	—
2014–15	HC Verva Litvínov	ELH	17	4	1	5	26	—	—	—	—	—
TCH totals			152	25	75	100	76	—	—	—	—	—
NHL totals			622	56	193	249	838	42	4	14	18	39
ELH totals			246	36	79	115	671	20	2	6	8	66

=== International ===
Year	Team	Event	Place	GP	G	A	Pts	PIM
1989	Czechoslovakia	EJC	2nd place, silver medalist(s)	6	3	1	4	4
1990	Czechoslovakia	WJC	3rd place, bronze medalist(s)	7	3	4	7	18
1991	Czechoslovakia	WJC	3rd place, bronze medalist(s)	7	0	9	9	14
1991	Czechoslovakia	WC	6th	9	2	1	3	32
1991	Czechoslovakia	CC	6th	5	0	1	1	25
1992	Czechoslovakia	OLY	3rd place, bronze medalist(s)	8	1	1	2	14
1996	Czech Republic	WCH	8th	3	0	0	0	6
1997	Czech Republic	WC	3rd place, bronze medalist(s)	8	1	1	2	35
1998	Czech Republic	OLY	1st place, gold medalist(s)	6	1	0	1	8
1998	Czech Republic	WC	3rd place, bronze medalist(s)	6	0	1	1	20
2004	Czech Republic	WCH	3rd place, bronze medalist(s)	3	1	0	1	2
2004	Czech Republic	WC	5th	7	0	2	2	10
2005	Czech Republic	WC	1st place, gold medalist(s)	9	0	0	0	6
Junior totals				20	6	5	11	36
Senior totals				64	6	7	13	158

== See also ==
- Notable families in the NHL
