= Toronto Planets =

- City: Toronto, Ontario
- Founded: 1993
- Folded: 1993
- Home arena: Varsity Arena (1993)

The Toronto Planets were a team in the Roller Hockey International league. The Planets played their home games at Varsity Arena during the league's first season in 1993, but folded at the conclusion of the season.

The Planets finished in first place in the Murphy Division during their only season of play, but lost in the Quarterfinals of the Murphy Cup Playoffs to the Los Angeles Blades.

Manny Legace, who went on to play in the National Hockey League, played goal for the Planets.
