= Steve Duchesne =

Canadian ice hockey player (born 1965)

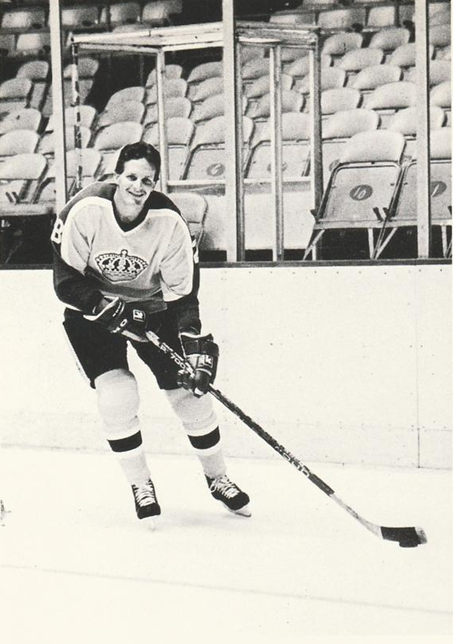
- Born: June 30, 1965 (age 61) Sept-Îles, Quebec, Canada
- Height: 5 ft 11 in (180 cm)
- Weight: 195 lb (88 kg; 13 st 13 lb)
- Position: Defence
- Shot: Left
- Played for: Los Angeles Kings; Philadelphia Flyers; Quebec Nordiques; St. Louis Blues; Ottawa Senators; Detroit Red Wings
- National team: Canada
- NHL draft: Undrafted
- Playing career: 1985–2002

Steve Duchesne (born June 30, 1965) is a Canadian former professional ice hockey defenceman who played in the National Hockey League (NHL) with several teams from 1986 until 2002. A notable offensive defenceman who scored 20 or more goals in a season four times, he was a three-time NHL All-Star and a member of the Stanley Cup champion Detroit Red Wings in 2002.

== Playing career ==
Duchesne began his notable hockey career with the Drummondville Voltigeurs of the Quebec Major Junior Hockey League. Never drafted by an NHL team, he was signed as a free agent by the Los Angeles Kings on October 1, 1984. He played one season with the New Haven Nighthawks of the American Hockey League before becoming an NHL regular in 1986–87. In his rookie NHL season, he played well enough to be named to the NHL All-Rookie Team. It did not take Duchesne long to establish himself as an above average offensive defenceman. In the 1988–89 NHL season, he led all defensemen in shorthanded goals with 5 and was fifth in voting for the Norris Trophy.

Duchesne remained with the Kings until May 30, 1991, when he was traded to the Philadelphia Flyers in a deal that brought future Hall of Famer Jari Kurri to Los Angeles. Duchesne played one season in Philadelphia, before being involved in one of the biggest trades in NHL history, moving to the Quebec Nordiques with a package of several players and cash in the Eric Lindros trade. Although Duchesne set a career high with 82 points in Quebec, he was again traded after one season to the St. Louis Blues. He spent two seasons with the Blues before being acquired by the upstart Ottawa Senators for a second round draft pick. After two successful seasons with the Senators, in which he scored the goal that clinched the team's first ever playoff spot, he was traded back to the Blues for Igor Kravchuk. Duchesne's journeyman status continued, as he returned to the Kings as a free agent after one season with the Blues. During his first season back with the Kings, he was traded to the Flyers at the trade deadline for Dave Babych and a fifth round draft pick. Finally, after the 1998–99 season, Duchesne signed as a free agent with the Detroit Red Wings, where he would win the Stanley Cup in his final season, 2001–02.

== Personal life ==
Duchesne now resides in Westlake, Texas with his wife and two children. He coaches the U18 Dallas Stars Midget Major AAA hockey team. He is a co-owner of the Allen Americans, a Central Hockey League team which began play in the 2009-10 season.

== International play ==
Medal record

Representing Canada

World Championships
Gold medal – first place	1994 Milan	
Silver medal – second place	1996 Vienna	

Duchesne won gold and silver with Team Canada in two international tournaments.

== Awards ==
- QMJHL First All-Star Team (1985)
- NHL All-Rookie Team (1987)
- Played in NHL All-Star Game (1989, 1990, 1993)
- Barry Ashbee Trophy (1992)
- Stanley Cup Champion (2002)

== Career statistics ==
=== Regular season and playoffs ===
			Regular season					Playoffs
Season	Team	League	GP	G	A	Pts	PIM	GP	G	A	Pts	PIM
1981–82	Cégep Beauce-Appalaches	CEGEP	—	—	—	—	—	—	—	—	—	—
1982–83	Drummondville Voltigeurs	QMJHL	66	5	16	21	75	—	—	—	—	—
1983–84	Drummondville Voltigeurs	QMJHL	67	1	34	35	79	10	3	7	10	17
1984–85	Drummondville Voltigeurs	QMJHL	65	22	54	76	94	5	4	7	11	8
1985–86	New Haven Nighthawks	AHL	75	14	35	49	76	5	0	2	2	9
1986–87	Los Angeles Kings	NHL	75	13	25	38	74	5	2	2	4	4
1987–88	Los Angeles Kings	NHL	71	16	39	55	109	5	1	3	4	14
1988–89	Los Angeles Kings	NHL	79	25	50	75	92	11	4	4	8	12
1989–90	Los Angeles Kings	NHL	79	20	42	62	36	10	2	9	11	6
1990–91	Los Angeles Kings	NHL	78	21	41	62	66	12	4	8	12	8
1991–92	Philadelphia Flyers	NHL	78	18	38	56	86	—	—	—	—	—
1992–93	Quebec Nordiques	NHL	82	20	62	82	57	6	0	5	5	6
1993–94	St. Louis Blues	NHL	36	12	19	31	14	4	0	2	2	2
1994–95	St. Louis Blues	NHL	47	12	26	38	36	7	0	4	4	2
1995–96	Ottawa Senators	NHL	62	12	24	36	42	—	—	—	—	—
1996–97	Ottawa Senators	NHL	78	19	28	47	38	7	1	4	5	0
1997–98	St. Louis Blues	NHL	80	14	42	56	32	10	0	4	4	6
1998–99	Los Angeles Kings	NHL	60	4	19	23	22	—	—	—	—	—
1998–99	Philadelphia Flyers	NHL	11	2	5	7	2	6	0	2	2	2
1999–00	Detroit Red Wings	NHL	79	10	31	41	42	9	0	4	4	10
2000–01	Detroit Red Wings	NHL	54	6	19	25	48	6	2	4	6	0
2001–02	Detroit Red Wings	NHL	64	3	15	18	28	23	0	6	6	24
NHL totals			1,113	227	525	752	824	121	16	61	77	96

=== International ===
Year	Team	Event	Result	GP	G	A	Pts	PIM
1994	Canada	WC	1st place, gold medalist(s)	6	0	1	1	0
1996	Canada	WC	2nd place, silver medalist(s)	8	1	3	4	4
Senior totals				14	1	4	5	4

== See also ==
- List of NHL players with 1,000 games played
