= Yuri Butsayev =

Russian ice hockey player (born 1978)

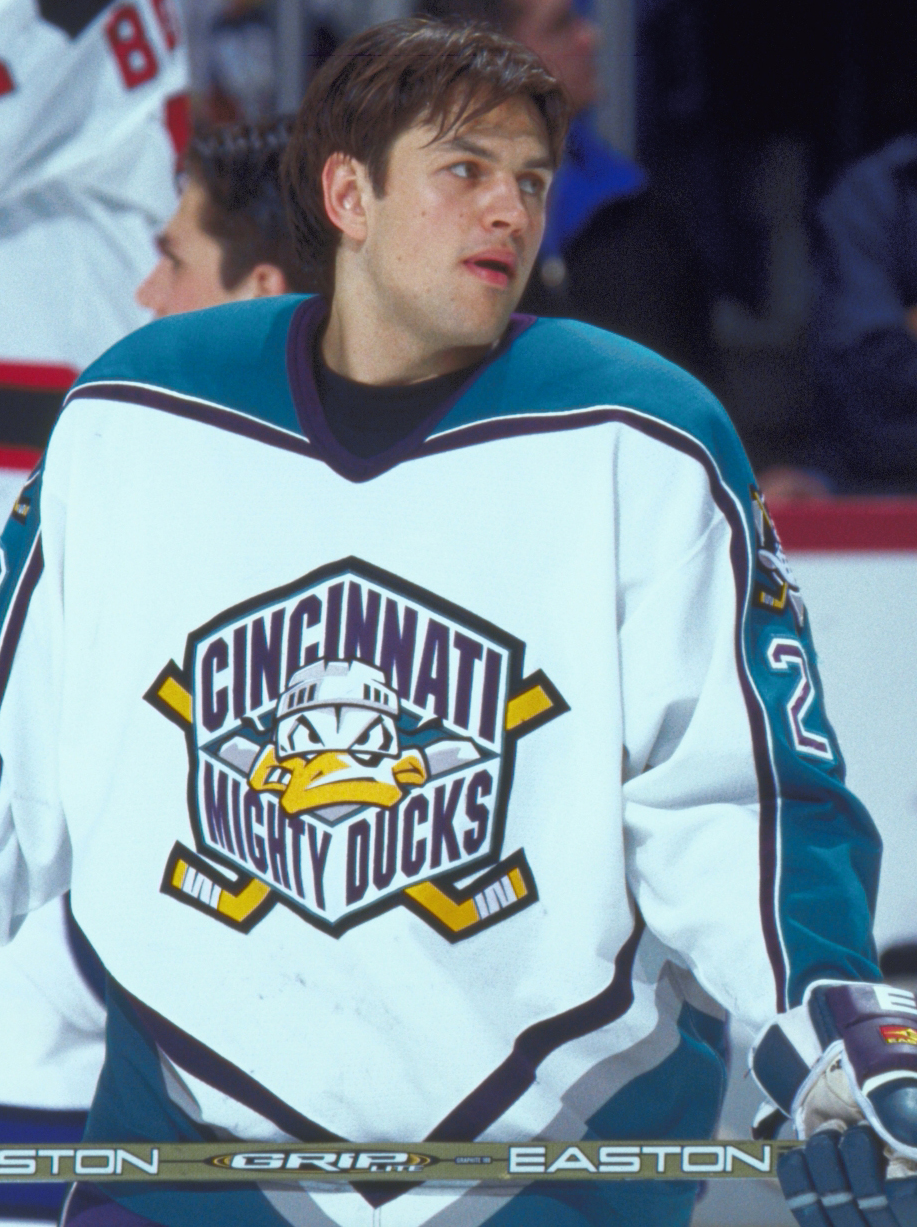
- Butsayev in 2001
- Born: October 11, 1978 (age 47) Togliatti, Soviet Union
- Height: 6 ft 1 in (185 cm)
- Weight: 205 lb (93 kg; 14 st 9 lb)
- Position: Left wing
- Shot: Left
- Played for: Lada Togliatti; Dynamo Moscow; Detroit Red Wings; Atlanta Thrashers; Lokomotiv Yaroslavl; CSKA Moscow; HC MVD; Torpedo Nizhny Novgorod; Sibir Novosibirsk
- National team: Russia
- NHL draft: 49th overall, 1997; Detroit Red Wings
- Playing career: 1995–2012

Yuri Gennadievich Butsayev (Russian: Юрий Геннадъевич Буцаев); born October 11, 1978) is a Russian former professional ice hockey winger. He played in the National Hockey League (NHL) with the Detroit Red Wings and the Atlanta Thrashers. He was drafted in the second round, 49th overall, by the Red Wings in the 1997 NHL entry draft. Yuri is the brother of the former NHL player Viacheslav Butsayev.

== Playing career ==
Drafted from HC Lada Togliatti, Butsayev made his National Hockey League debut with the Red Wings during the 1999–2000 season, appearing in 57 games and scoring five goals. After spending parts of the next two seasons with the Red Wings, Butsayev was traded to the Atlanta Thrashers along with a draft pick for defenceman Jiri Slegr.

== Personal ==
In September 2009 Butsayev was found guilty and sentenced to 10 months of conditional imprisonment for rape in Finland. The sexual assault had happened in Asikkala in July 2009. Butsayev was imprisoned for more than a month, but was allowed to leave the country after receiving his sentence.

== Career statistics ==
=== Regular season and playoffs ===
			Regular season					Playoffs
Season	Team	League	GP	G	A	Pts	PIM	GP	G	A	Pts	PIM
1994–95	Lada Togliatti-2	RUS-	44	3	2	5	15	—	—	—	—	—
1995–96	Lada Togliatti	IHL	1	0	0	0	0	—	—	—	—	—
1995–96	Lada Togliatti-2	RUS-2	38	19	7	26	58	—	—	—	—	—
1996–97	Lada Togliatti	RSL	42	13	11	24	38	11	2	2	4	8
1996–97	Lada Togliatti-2	RUS-3	1	1	0	1	0	—	—	—	—	—
1997–98	Lada Togliatti	RSL	43	8	9	17	61	5	0	1	1	2
1998–99	Lada Togliatti	RSL	39	10	8	18	55	7	1	2	3	14
1998–99	Dynamo Moscow	RSL	1	0	1	1	0	—	—	—	—	—
1999–00	Detroit Red Wings	NHL	57	3	5	8	12	—	—	—	—	—
1999–00	Cincinnati Mighty Ducks	AHL	9	0	1	1	0	—	—	—	—	—
2000–01	Detroit Red Wings	NHL	15	1	1	2	4	—	—	—	—	—
2000–01	Cincinnati Mighty Ducks	AHL	54	29	17	46	26	4	0	2	2	2
2001–02	Detroit Red Wings	NHL	3	0	0	0	0	—	—	—	—	—
2001–02	Cincinnati Mighty Ducks	AHL	61	21	23	44	44	—	—	—	—	—
2001–02	Atlanta Thrashers	NHL	8	2	0	2	4	—	—	—	—	—
2001–02	Chicago Wolves	AHL	4	1	1	2	0	22	7	4	11	20
2002–03	Atlanta Thrashers	NHL	16	2	0	2	8	—	—	—	—	—
2002–03	Chicago Wolves	AHL	7	6	3	9	0	—	—	—	—	—
2002–03	Lokomotiv Yaroslavl	RSL	19	2	5	7	37	10	2	3	5	4
2003–04	CSKA Moscow	RSL	18	1	3	4	6	—	—	—	—	—
2003–04	Lada Togliatti	RSL	28	7	3	10	30	6	1	0	1	0
2004–05	Lada Togliatti	RSL	42	6	6	12	32	10	2	2	4	6
2004–05	Lada Togliatti-2	RUS-3	8	7	6	13	4	—	—	—	—	—
2005–06	HC MVD	RSL	38	2	7	9	37	—	—	—	—	—
2006–07	Lada Togliatti	RSL	44	10	6	16	40	3	0	2	2	4
2007–08	Torpedo Nizhny Novgorod	RSL	57	8	8	16	71	—	—	—	—	—
2008–09	Torpedo Nizhny Novgorod	KHL	54	9	10	19	69	—	—	—	—	—
2009–10	Yugra Khanty-Mansiysk	VHL	28	10	5	15	18	17	9	3	12	18
2010–11	Sibir Novosibirsk	KHL	7	0	0	0	2	—	—	—	—	—
2010–11	Zauralie Kurgan	VHL	38	7	9	16	24	—	—	—	—	—
2011–12	CSKA Moscow	KHL	50	0	4	4	32	5	1	0	1	22
RUS totals			372	67	67	134	407	52	8	12	20	38
KHL totals			111	9	14	23	103	5	1	0	1	22
NHL totals			99	10	4	14	28	—	—	—	—	—

=== International ===
Year	Team	Event	Result	GP	G	A	Pts	PIM
1997	Russia	WJC	3rd place, bronze medalist(s)	6	1	0	1	0
Junior totals				6	1	0	1	0

== Awards and honours ==
Award	Year
AHL
All-Star Game	2001
Calder Cup (Chicago Wolves)	2002
