= Fredrik Olausson =

Swedish ice hockey player and coach

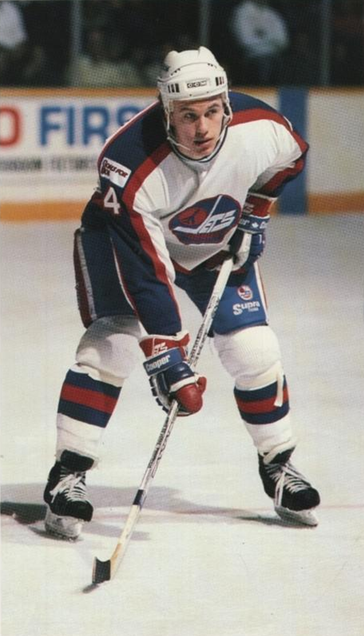
- Born: October 5, 1966 (age 60) Nybro, Sweden
- Height: 6 ft 1 in (185 cm)
- Weight: 198 lb (90 kg; 14 st 2 lb)
- Position: Defence
- Shot: Right
- Played for: Nybro IF; Färjestads BK; Winnipeg Jets; Edmonton Oilers; Mighty Ducks of Anaheim; Pittsburgh Penguins; SC Bern; Detroit Red Wings; HV 71
- National team: Sweden
- NHL draft: 81st overall, 1985; Winnipeg Jets
- Playing career: 1984–2007

Karl-Gustav Fredrik Olausson (born October 5, 1966) is a Swedish former ice hockey player from Nybro who is currently assistant coach for HV71 in Elitserien. He had previously played 17 seasons in the NHL and another 6 in Sweden.

He was a member of the 2002 Stanley Cup champion Detroit Red Wings.

== Career ==
Olausson played with certainty and calmness and was known for a good feel for the game. He represented Sweden for the first time on February 9, 1986, against the Soviets in Stockholm. He has won the Stanley Cup with the Detroit Red Wings in 2002 and played in the Stanley Cup Final in 2003 with Mighty Ducks of Anaheim.

Olausson was drafted in the 1985 NHL entry draft by Winnipeg Jets, with the 81st overall selection. During his career in NHL he has played for Winnipeg Jets, Edmonton Oilers, Mighty Ducks of Anaheim, Pittsburgh Penguins, and Detroit Red Wings.

During Elitserien playoffs in 2006, Olausson suffered a knee injury (torn ligament) in the third quarterfinal game with HV71 against Mora IK. He was able to continue play, although sparingly, in the playoffs using a specially designed knee protection.

After the season, Olausson moved back to Karlstad and in July 2006 he signed a one-year-contract with Färjestads BK, the same club that he played with between 1984 and 1986, before signing with the Jets. It was reported on February 27, 2007, that Olausson would have to retire due to serious illness (primary sclerosing cholangitis). In December 2006, he reportedly underwent two surgeries, and received a liver transplant in the summer of 2007.

He was named assistant coach of HV71 of the Swedish Elite League for the 2009–10 season.

== Awards ==
- Silver medal with Team Sweden at the 1986 Ice Hockey World Championships.
- Winner of the Swedish National Championship with Färjestads BK in 1986 and HV71 in 2004.
- Named to the Swedish World All-Star Team in 1986.
- Named Elitserien Rookie of the Year in 1986.
- Winter Olympics, 5th place, in 2002.
- Stanley Cup winner with Detroit Red Wings in 2002.

== Career statistics ==
=== Regular season and playoffs ===
			Regular season					Playoffs
Season	Team	League	GP	G	A	Pts	PIM	GP	G	A	Pts	PIM
1982–83	Nybro IF	SWE.2	31	4	4	8	12	—	—	—	—	—
1983–84	Nybro IF	SWE.2	28	8	14	22	32	—	—	—	—	—
1984–85	Färjestad BK	SEL	29	6	12	18	22	3	1	0	1	0
1985–86	Färjestad BK	SEL	33	4	12	16	22	8	3	2	5	6
1986–87	Winnipeg Jets	NHL	72	7	29	36	26	10	2	3	5	4
1987–88	Winnipeg Jets	NHL	38	5	10	15	18	5	1	1	2	0
1988–89	Winnipeg Jets	NHL	75	15	47	62	32	—	—	—	—	—
1989–90	Winnipeg Jets	NHL	77	9	46	55	32	7	0	2	2	2
1990–91	Winnipeg Jets	NHL	71	12	29	41	24	—	—	—	—	—
1991–92	Winnipeg Jets	NHL	77	20	42	62	34	7	1	5	6	4
1992–93	Winnipeg Jets	NHL	68	16	41	57	22	6	0	2	2	2
1993–94	Winnipeg Jets	NHL	18	2	5	7	10	—	—	—	—	—
1993–94	Edmonton Oilers	NHL	55	9	19	28	20	—	—	—	—	—
1994–95	EC Ehrwald	AUT	10	4	3	7	8	—	—	—	—	—
1994–95	Edmonton Oilers	NHL	33	0	10	10	20	—	—	—	—	—
1995–96	Edmonton Oilers	NHL	20	0	6	6	14	—	—	—	—	—
1995–96	Mighty Ducks of Anaheim	NHL	36	2	16	18	24	—	—	—	—	—
1996–97	Mighty Ducks of Anaheim	NHL	20	2	9	11	8	—	—	—	—	—
1996–97	Pittsburgh Penguins	NHL	51	7	20	27	24	4	0	1	1	0
1997–98	Pittsburgh Penguins	NHL	76	6	27	33	42	6	0	3	3	2
1998–99	Mighty Ducks of Anaheim	NHL	74	16	40	56	30	4	0	2	2	4
1999–2000	Mighty Ducks of Anaheim	NHL	70	15	19	34	28	—	—	—	—	—
2000–01	SC Bern	NLA	43	12	15	27	28	4	1	4	5	0
2001–02	Detroit Red Wings	NHL	47	2	13	15	22	21	2	4	6	10
2002–03	Mighty Ducks of Anaheim	NHL	44	2	6	8	22	1	0	0	0	0
2003–04	HV71	SEL	45	8	13	21	44	19	4	6	10	26
2004–05	HV71	SEL	41	8	20	28	40	—	—	—	—	—
2005–06	HV71	SEL	46	7	21	28	26	7	0	3	3	4
2006–07	Färjestad BK	SEL	12	0	6	6	6	—	—	—	—	—
SEL totals			206	32	84	116	160	37	8	11	19	36
NHL totals			1,022	147	434	581	452	71	6	23	29	28

=== International ===
Year	Team	Event	GP	G	A	Pts	PIM
1983	Sweden	EJC	5	1	2	3	2
1984	Sweden	EJC	5	2	3	5	14
1985	Sweden	WJC	7	1	1	2	4
1986	Sweden	WJC	7	4	2	6	11
1986	Sweden	WC	10	1	0	1	4
1989	Sweden	WC	9	3	1	4	6
2002	Sweden	OG	4	0	0	0	2
Junior totals			24	8	8	16	31
Senior totals			23	4	1	5	12

== See also ==
- List of NHL players with 1,000 games played
