= Maxim Kuznetsov =

Russian ice hockey player (born 1977)

- Born: March 24, 1977 (age 49) Pavlodar, Kazakh SSR, Soviet Union
- Height: 6 ft 5 in (196 cm)
- Weight: 240 lb (109 kg; 17 st 2 lb)
- Position: Defence
- Shot: Left
- Played for: Traktor Chelyabinsk; Vityaz Chekhov; Avangard Omsk; SKA Saint Petersburg; Dynamo Moscow; Los Angeles Kings (NHL); Detroit Red Wings (NHL)
- NHL draft: 26th overall, 1995; Detroit Red Wings
- Playing career: 1995–2008

Maxim Romanovich Kuznetsov (Russian: Максим Романович Кузнецов; born March 24, 1977) is a Kazakhstan-born Russian former professional ice hockey player. Kuznetsov was drafted in the 1st round (26th overall) by the Detroit Red Wings in the 1995 NHL entry draft.

== Playing career ==
After the 1995 draft, Kuznetsov played for the Dynamo Moscow before making the trip to North America. For two games in the 96–97 season and until the end of the 98–99 season he played for the Detroit Red Wings' AHL affiliate, the Adirondack Red Wings. He followed this with a single season playing for the Cincinnati Mighty Ducks before being called up to the NHL in the 00–01 season. Unfortunately, a knee injury suffered in a game against Vancouver caused him to miss much of the remaining season. The following year he found his place with the Wings as a true defenceman and bolstered the already deep blueline, helping the Wings to win the Stanley Cup. He played 39 regular season games, but did not play in the playoffs. His name was left off the Stanley Cup, because he was two games short of 41 minimum required to be engraved on the cup. However, Detroit did award Maxim with a Stanley Cup Ring.

In the latter part of the 02–03 season, Kuznetsov was traded to the Los Angeles Kings along with Sean Avery and two draft picks for Mathieu Schneider. Upon his arrival with the Kings organization, he spent the majority of his playing time with the team's AHL affiliate, the Manchester Monarchs.

On June 7, 2004 Kuznetsov signed as a free agent with Dynamo Moscow (due to the NHL lockout) once again. After playing only ten games for Moscow he was released and then signed as a free agent by SKA Saint Petersburg where he continued to contribute with his hard lined defensive play.

== Career statistics ==
			Regular season					Playoffs
Season	Team	League	GP	G	A	Pts	PIM	GP	G	A	Pts	PIM
1993–94	Dynamo–2 Moscow	RUS.2	32	4	4	8	62	—	—	—	—	—
1994–95	Dynamo Moscow	IHL	11	0	0	0	8	—	—	—	—	—
1994–95	Dynamo–2 Moscow	RUS.2	36	4	7	11	75	—	—	—	—	—
1995–96	Dynamo Moscow	IHL	9	1	1	2	22	4	0	0	0	0
1995–96	Dynamo–2 Moscow	RUS.2	28	6	7	13	28	—	—	—	—	—
1996–97	Dynamo Moscow	RSL	23	0	2	2	16	—	—	—	—	—
1996–97	Dynamo–2 Moscow	RUS.3	4	0	0	0	0	—	—	—	—	—
1996–97	Adirondack Red Wings	AHL	2	0	1	1	6	2	0	0	0	0
1997–98	Adirondack Red Wings	AHL	51	5	5	10	43	3	0	1	1	4
1998–99	Adirondack Red Wings	AHL	60	0	4	4	30	3	0	0	0	0
1999–2000	Cincinnati Mighty Ducks	AHL	47	2	9	11	36	—	—	—	—	—
2000–01	Detroit Red Wings	NHL	25	1	2	3	23	—	—	—	—	—
2001–02	Detroit Red Wings	NHL	39	1	2	3	40	—	—	—	—	—
2001–02	Cincinnati Mighty Ducks	AHL	7	1	0	1	4	—	—	—	—	—
2002–03	Detroit Red Wings	NHL	53	0	3	3	54	—	—	—	—	—
2002–03	Los Angeles Kings	NHL	3	0	0	0	0	—	—	—	—	—
2003–04	Los Angeles Kings	NHL	16	0	1	1	20	—	—	—	—	—
2003–04	Manchester Monarchs	AHL	39	2	8	10	57	2	0	0	0	4
2004–05	Dynamo Moscow	RSL	10	0	0	0	24	—	—	—	—	—
2004–05	SKA St. Petersburg	RSL	34	4	6	10	72	—	—	—	—	—
2005–06	Avangard Omsk	RSL	6	0	1	1	6	—	—	—	—	—
2005–06	Avangard–2 Omsk	RUS.3	2	0	0	0	12	—	—	—	—	—
2005–06	SKA St. Petersburg	RSL	15	1	0	1	26	3	0	0	0	4
2006–07	SKA St. Petersburg	RSL	14	0	1	1	12	—	—	—	—	—
2006–07	SKA–2 St. Petersburg	RUS.3	29	4	10	14	66	—	—	—	—	—
2007–08	Vityaz Chekhov	RSL	31	2	1	3	67	—	—	—	—	—
2007–08	Vityaz–2 Podolsk	RUS.3	9	2	2	4	4	—	—	—	—	—
2008–09	Traktor Chelyabinsk	KHL	10	0	0	0	16	—	—	—	—	—
RSL totals			133	7	11	18	223	3	0	0	0	4
AHL totals			206	10	27	37	176	10	0	1	1	8
NHL totals			136	2	8	10	137	—	—	—	—	—

Preceded by Yan Golubovsky	Detroit Red Wings first-round draft pick 1995	Succeeded by Jesse Wallin
