= Jiří Fischer =

Czech ice hockey player (born 1980)

- Born: 31 July 1980 (age 46) Hořovice, Czechoslovakia
- Height: 6 ft 5 in (196 cm)
- Weight: 225 lb (102 kg; 16 st 1 lb)
- Position: Defence
- Shot: Left
- Played for: Detroit Red Wings; HC Bílí Tygři Liberec
- National team: Czech Republic
- NHL draft: 25th overall, 1998; Detroit Red Wings
- Playing career: 1999–2005

Jiří Fischer (born 31 July 1980) is a Czech former professional ice hockey defenceman in the National Hockey League (NHL) who played his entire career with the Detroit Red Wings. He currently serves as Detroit's Director of Player Evaluation. Fischer was selected in the 1998 NHL entry draft in the first round, 25th overall, by the Red Wings, and was a part of the team that won the 2002 Stanley Cup Final.

Fischer's playing career ended at age 25, early in his sixth NHL season, after he went into cardiac arrest in a November 2005 game; he narrowly escaped death due to the immediate action of doctors and other arena personnel. He subsequently retired due to his heart problems.

He also served as the assistant coach for the Czech Republic during the 2012 IIHF World Junior Hockey Championships.

== In-game cardiac arrest ==
During a game on 21 November 2005, against the Nashville Predators, Fischer collapsed on the bench after going into cardiac arrest. After being unconscious for six minutes, Fischer was resuscitated by CPR and by an automated external defibrillator by Dr. Tony Colucci, and was taken to Detroit Receiving Hospital. The game was postponed due to his cardiac arrest, and was made up on 23 January 2006. This marked the first time in NHL history that a game had been postponed due to a medical incident. The makeup game was played for the full 60 minutes, though the Predators were allowed to maintain their 1–0 lead from the original game. Nashville ultimately won by a score of 3–2. As a result, the game that was originally scheduled for January 23 at Nashville between the two teams was moved to March 30, 2006.

Fischer was released from the hospital on 23 November 2005. Although the exact cause of Fischer's collapse remained unknown, team physician Tony Colucci indicated that Fischer's heart may have experienced either ventricular tachycardia, a type of racing heartbeat, or ventricular fibrillation, a disorganized cardiac rhythm. Doctors ordered Fischer to avoid all physical activity for four to six weeks, and no prognosis was made on whether he would be able to continue his ice hockey career. Fischer continued to suffer heart trouble after the in-game incident. On 28 November, Fischer suffered a "brief, abnormal cardiac rhythm", while at his home in Detroit. He was released from the hospital two days later.

Fischer's future as a hockey player remained in question over a year after his collapse. By the time his contract expired at the end of the 2006–07 season, it was obvious he would never be medically cleared to play again, and he was forced to retire. General manager Ken Holland wanted to keep Fischer in the organization, and offered him a job as director of player development. Fischer had long liked working with young players and accepted.

== Return to the ice ==
Fischer returned to the ice for the Detroit Red Wings in the first of two Alumni Showdown games at Comerica Park as part of the 2013 Hockeytown Winter Festival on 31 December 2013, scoring the first goal of the game.

== Personal life ==
Fischer's sons, Lukas and Braidan, are also ice hockey players. With Lukas playing for the Soo Greyhounds of the Ontario Hockey League as a prospect of the St. Louis Blues, and Braidan playing for the Allen Americans of the ECHL.

== Career statistics ==
=== Regular season and playoffs ===
			Regular season					Playoffs
Season	Team	League	GP	G	A	Pts	PIM	GP	G	A	Pts	PIM
1995–96	HC Poldi Kladno	CZE U20	39	6	10	16	—	—	—	—	—	—
1996–97	HC Poldi Kladno	CZE U20	38	7	21	28	—	—	—	—	—	—
1997–98	Hull Olympiques	QMJHL	70	3	19	22	112	11	1	4	5	16
1998–99	Hull Olympiques	QMJHL	65	22	56	78	141	23	6	17	23	44
1999–00	Detroit Red Wings	NHL	52	0	8	8	45	—	—	—	—	—
1999–00	Cincinnati Mighty Ducks	AHL	7	0	2	2	10	—	—	—	—	—
2000–01	Detroit Red Wings	NHL	55	1	8	9	59	5	0	0	0	9
2000–01	Cincinnati Mighty Ducks	AHL	18	2	6	8	22	—	—	—	—	—
2001–02	Detroit Red Wings	NHL	80	2	8	10	67	22	3	3	6	30
2002–03	Detroit Red Wings	NHL	15	1	5	6	16	—	—	—	—	—
2003–04	Detroit Red Wings	NHL	81	4	15	19	75	11	1	0	1	16
2004–05	Bílí Tygři Liberec	ELH	27	6	12	18	52	11	1	4	5	22
2004–05	HC Berounští Medvědi	CZE.2	1	0	1	1	25	—	—	—	—	—
2005–06	Detroit Red Wings	NHL	22	3	5	8	33	—	—	—	—	—
NHL totals			305	11	49	60	295	38	4	3	7	55

=== International ===
Year	Team	Event	GP	G	A	Pts	PIM
1997	Czech Republic	EJC	6	1	0	1	8
2004	Czech Republic	WCH	4	0	0	0	2
2005	Czech Republic	WC	9	0	1	1	4
Senior totals			13	0	1	1	6

Preceded by Jesse Wallin	Detroit Red Wings first-round draft pick 1998	Succeeded by Niklas Kronwall
