= Jesse Wallin =

Canadian ice hockey player (born 1978)

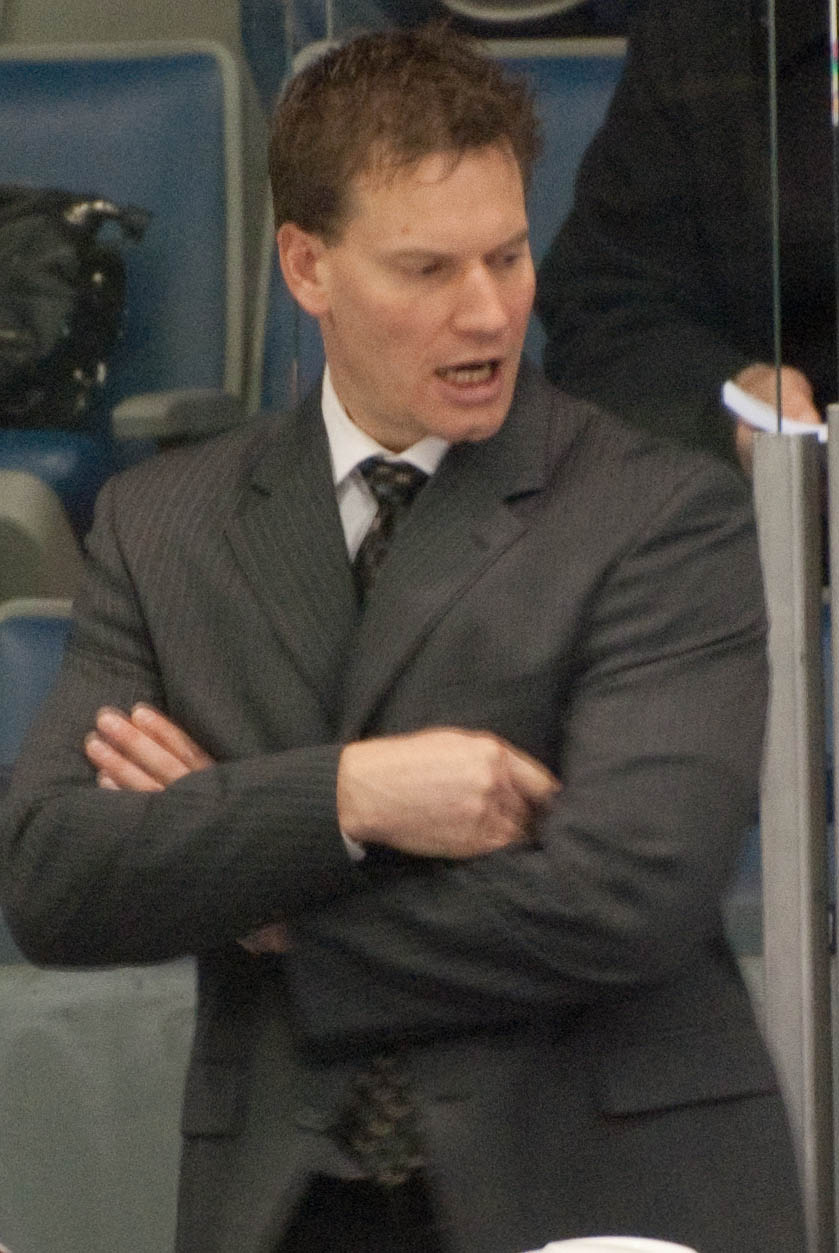
- Born: March 10, 1978 (age 47) Saskatoon, Saskatchewan, Canada
- Height: 6 ft 2 in (188 cm)
- Weight: 190 lb (86 kg; 13 st 8 lb)
- Position: Defence
- Shot: Left
- Played for: AHL; Adirondack Red Wings; Cincinnati Mighty Ducks; Lowell Lock Monsters; NHL; Detroit Red Wings
- NHL draft: 26th overall, 1996; Detroit Red Wings
- Playing career: 1998–2003

Jesse Wallin (born March 10, 1978) is a Canadian former professional ice hockey defenceman who played in 49 career National Hockey League games for the Detroit Red Wings. He was born in Saskatoon, Saskatchewan, but was raised and played his minor hockey in North Battleford, Saskatchewan. He was the General Manager and Head Coach of the Red Deer Rebels of the Western Hockey League (WHL) for five seasons, and is currently an amateur scout for the Detroit Red Wings.

== Playing career ==
Wallin's career began in the WHL playing for the Red Deer Rebels. From 1994 to 1998 he helped this team to the playoffs three times with his solid defensive skills. In 1996 he was taken 1st (26th overall) by the Detroit Red Wings in the NHL Draft, then returned to the WHL and went on to be named the CHL Humanitarian of the Year in 1997. Wallin was a two time member of Team Canada at the World Junior Championships, winning gold in 1997 and captaining the team in 1998. Wallin received the Doug Wickenheiser Memorial Trophy back-to-back in 1996–97 and 1997–98 for being the WHL's Humanitarian of the Year, particularly for his efforts in raising the profile of mental health.

Wallin made his professional debut with the American Hockey League's (AHL) Adirondack Red Wings in 1998–99 and spent the majority of his first three professional seasons in the AHL, the final two with the Cincinnati Mighty Ducks. He made his NHL debut during the 1999–2000 season and joined the Red Wings during their 2001-02 Stanley Cup championship season playing only 15 games due to injuries. He was awarded a Stanley Cup ring, but didn't play enough games to get his name on the Stanley Cup.

After five seasons with the Red Wings, Wallin signed as a free agent with the Calgary Flames in the summer of 2003 and was sent back down the AHL to play for the Lowell Lock Monsters. In his first game, he suffered a concussion and was forced to retire as a result of this injury.

== Awards ==
- 1997 – CHL Humanitarian of the Year Award
- 1997 – WHL Humanitarian of the Year Award
- 1998 – WHL Humanitarian of the Year Award
- 1997 - World Junior Hockey Championship Gold Medalist
- 2011 - WHL Eastern Conference Coach of the Year

== Career statistics ==
=== Regular season and playoffs ===
| | | | Regular season | | | | | Playoffs |
| Season | Team | League | GP | G | A | Pts | PIM | GP | G | A | Pts | PIM |
|---|---|---|---|---|---|---|---|---|---|---|---|---|
| 1993–94 | Battlefords North Stars | SJHL | 32 | 1 | 7 | 8 | 41 | — | — | — | — | — |
| 1994–95 | Red Deer Rebels | WHL | 72 | 4 | 16 | 20 | 72 | — | — | — | — | — |
| 1995–96 | Red Deer Rebels | WHL | 70 | 5 | 19 | 24 | 61 | 9 | 0 | 3 | 3 | 4 |
| 1996–97 | Red Deer Rebels | WHL | 59 | 6 | 33 | 39 | 70 | 16 | 1 | 4 | 5 | 10 |
| 1997–98 | Red Deer Rebels | WHL | 14 | 1 | 6 | 7 | 17 | 5 | 0 | 1 | 1 | 2 |
| 1998–99 | Adirondack Red Wings | AHL | 76 | 4 | 12 | 16 | 34 | 3 | 0 | 2 | 2 | 2 |
| 1999–2000 | Detroit Red Wings | NHL | 1 | 0 | 0 | 0 | 0 | — | — | — | — | — |
| 1999–2000 | Cincinnati Mighty Ducks | AHL | 75 | 3 | 14 | 17 | 61 | — | — | — | — | — |
| 2000–01 | Detroit Red Wings | NHL | 1 | 0 | 0 | 0 | 2 | — | — | — | — | — |
| 2000–01 | Cincinnati Mighty Ducks | AHL | 76 | 2 | 15 | 17 | 50 | 4 | 0 | 1 | 1 | 4 |
| 2001–02 | Detroit Red Wings | NHL | 15 | 0 | 1 | 1 | 13 | — | — | — | — | — |
| 2001–02 | Cincinnati Mighty Ducks | AHL | 5 | 1 | 1 | 2 | 2 | — | — | — | — | — |
| 2002–03 | Detroit Red Wings | NHL | 32 | 0 | 1 | 1 | 19 | — | — | — | — | — |
| 2003–04 | Lowell Lock Monsters | AHL | 1 | 0 | 0 | 0 | 0 | — | — | — | — | — |
| AHL totals | | | 233 | 10 | 42 | 52 | 147 | 7 | 0 | 3 | 3 | 6 |
| NHL totals | | | 49 | 0 | 2 | 2 | 34 | — | — | — | — | — |

=== International ===
| Year | Team | Event | GP | G | A | Pts | PIM |
|---|---|---|---|---|---|---|---|
| 1997 | Canada | WJC | 7 | 0 | 0 | 0 | 6 |
| 1998 | Canada | WJC | 4 | 0 | 0 | 0 | 4 |
| Junior totals | | | 11 | 0 | 0 | 0 | 10 |

| Preceded by Maxim Kuznetsov | Detroit Red Wings first-round draft pick 1996 | Succeeded by Jiri Fischer |
| Preceded by Craig Mills | Winner of the CHL Humanitarian of the Year Award; 1997 | Succeeded by Jason Metcalfe |
| Preceded by Darryl Laplante | Winner of the WHL Humanitarian of the Year Award; 1997, 1998 | Succeeded by Andrew Ference |
