= Fors (locality) =

- Location within Dalarna Location within Sweden
- Coordinates: 60°12′N 16°19′E
- Country: Sweden
- Province: Dalarna
- County: Dalarna County
- Municipality: Avesta Municipality

Area
  - Total: 1.26 km^{2} (0.49 sq mi)

Population (31 December 2010)
  - Total: 827
  - Density: 658/km^{2} (1,700/sq mi)
- Time zone: UTC+1 (CET)
  - Summer (DST): UTC+2 (CEST)

Fors is a locality situated in Avesta Municipality, Dalarna County, Sweden, with 827 inhabitants in 2010.
