= 1951–52 NHL transactions =

The following is a list of all team-to-team transactions that have occurred in the National Hockey League (NHL) during the 1951–52 NHL season. It lists which team each player has been traded to and for which player(s) or other consideration(s), if applicable.

== Transactions ==
May, 1951 exact date unknown	To Boston Bruins cash	To Detroit Red Wings Ed Reigle
May 14, 1951	To Detroit Red Wings $30,000 cash	To New York Rangers Ed Reigle rights to Stephen Kraftcheck
June 8, 1951	To Detroit Red Wings Tony Leswick	To New York Rangers Gaye Stewart
June 19, 1951	To Montreal Canadiens Gerry Couture	To Detroit Red Wings Bert Hirschfeld
August 20, 1951	To Detroit Red Wings $75,000 cash future considerations^{1} (Hugh Coflin)	To Chicago Black Hawks George Gee; Clare Martin; Jim McFadden; Max McNab; Jimmy Peters Sr. Clare Raglan
August 20, 1951	To Boston Bruins Adam Brown	To Chicago Black Hawks cash
September 18, 1951	To Detroit Red Wings Doug McCaig	To Chicago Black Hawks Max Quackenbush
September 20, 1951	To Boston Bruins Gus Kyle rights to Pentti Lund	To New York Rangers Paul Ronty cash
September 23, 1951	To Toronto Maple Leafs cash	To Montreal Canadiens Jim McCormack
September 28, 1951	To Boston Bruins Sugar Jim Henry	To Detroit Red Wings cash
November 1, 1951	To Boston Bruins cash	To Chicago Black Hawks Pete Horeck
December 28, 1951	To Chicago Black Hawks cash	To New York Rangers rights to Clare Martin
January 9, 1952	To Toronto Maple Leafs Jim Morrison	To Boston Bruins Fleming MacKell
January 28, 1952	To Toronto Maple Leafs Bill Ezinicki	To Boston Bruins cash

Notes

1. Trade completed in October, 1951 (exact date unknown).
