= Game seven =

Deciding game in a sports playoff series

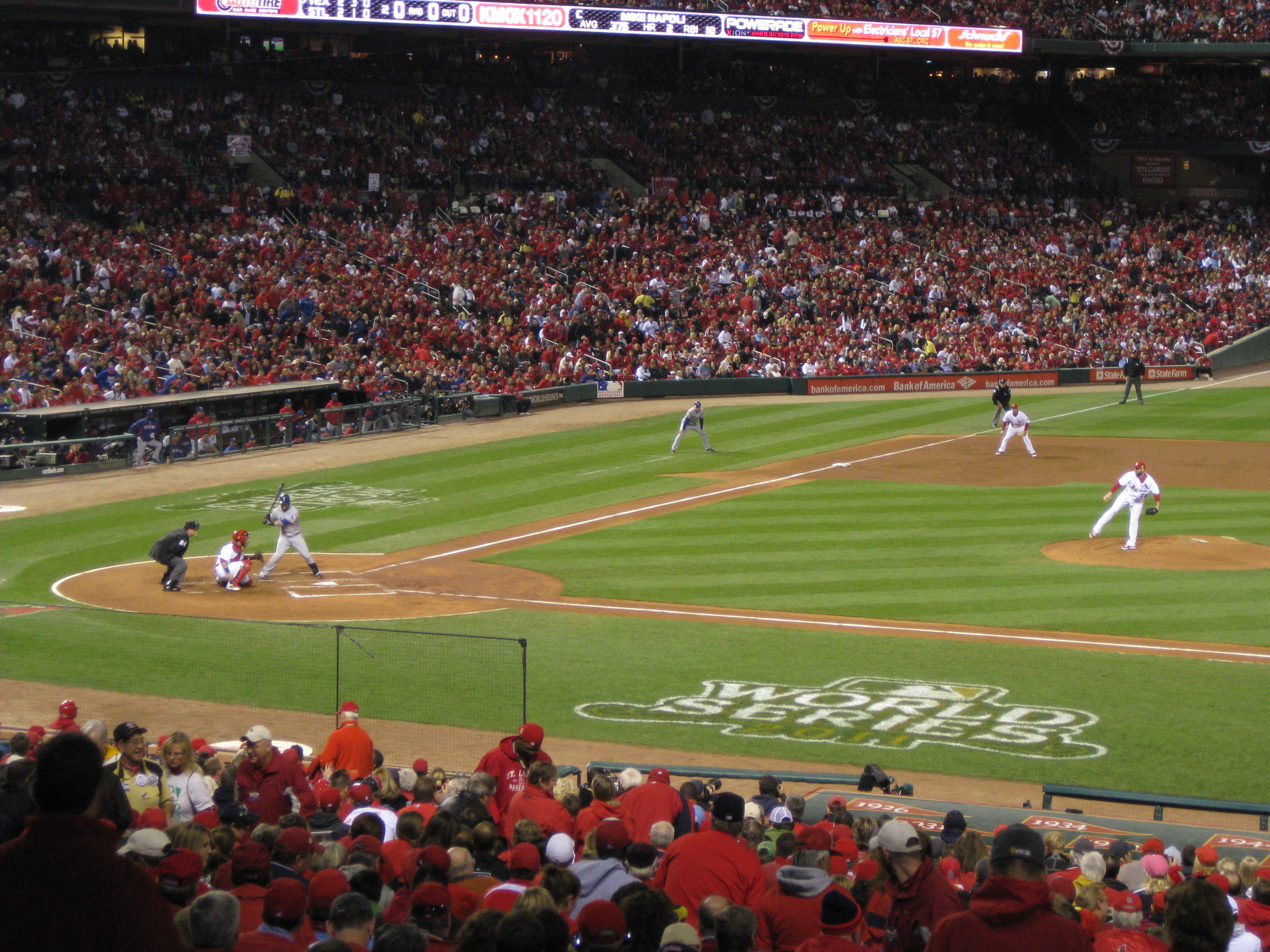
Chris Carpenter pitches to Mike Napoli in the second inning of game seven of the 2011 World Series.

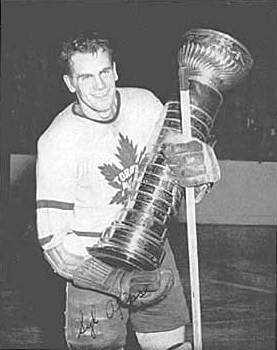
Syl Apps of the Toronto Maple Leafs after game seven of the 1942 Stanley Cup Final

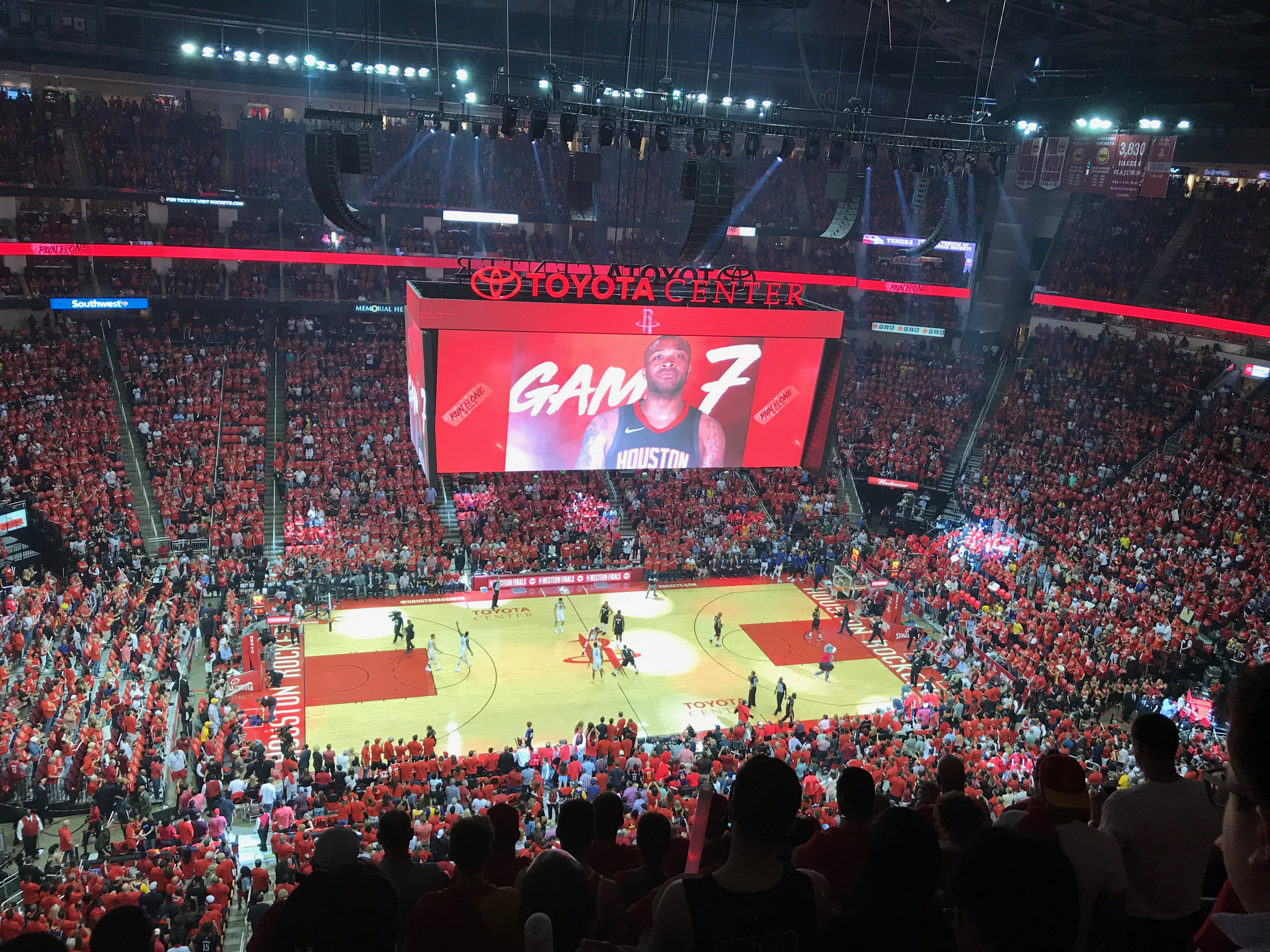
Inside the Toyota Center before tip off of game seven of the 2018 NBA Western Conference Finals between the Golden State Warriors and the Houston Rockets

A game seven is the final game of a best-of-seven series. This game can occur in the postseasons for Major League Baseball (MLB) (League Championship Series and World Series), the National Basketball Association (NBA) (all rounds of the NBA playoffs), and the National Hockey League (NHL) (all rounds of the Stanley Cup playoffs). The game is generally played at the site of the team holding the home advantage across the series. It can also happen on the television game show Jeopardy! with its Tournament of Champions format since Season 38, where a player must win three games to win the final (2-2-2 tie leads to a Game Seven).

The nature of a best-of-seven series requires that the series be tied 3–3 going into game seven, such that either team can take the series (advancing further in the playoffs or winning the championship) by winning the game. Because of this decisive nature, game sevens add an element of drama to their sports. Aside from North American sports leagues, game sevens are also a fixture in many other sports around the world, mostly in baseball, basketball, and ice hockey leagues. Most codes of football do not employ a best-of-seven series (or any best-of-x series in general), hence game sevens are not played in those leagues. Some playoff rounds (such as MLB's current Division Series) are played in a best-of-five format, such that game five has similar qualities to those described above, though the suspense and drama have less time to build in a shorter series. Furthermore, the World Series of 1903, 1919, 1920, and 1921 were played in a best-of-nine format, though none of the four went to a decisive game nine.

The game seven is comparable to a final or to a single game in a single-elimination tournament or to a one-game playoff. A championship series' game seven is equivalent to the Super Bowl game in the National Football League or the championship game of March Madness in college basketball in that the game's winner is the league's champion for the season.

== Examples ==
=== Baseball ===
==== Chinese Professional Baseball League ====
The Chinese Professional Baseball League's championship series, the Taiwan Series, has seen nine series decided in game seven.

Taiwan Series that were decided in game seven include:

Year	Winning team	Losing team	Score	Site	Notes
1991	Uni-President Lions	Wei Chuan Dragons	13–5	Taipei City	
1998	Wei Chuan Dragons	Sinon Bulls	5–2	Taichung City	Capacity audience.
2000	Uni-President Lions	Sinon Bulls	4–1	Taichung City	Capacity audience. Lo Min-ching homered the fifth time and then the sixth in the series.
2001	Brother Elephants	Uni-President Lions	7–5	Tainan City	Capacity audience. Yofu Tetsu saved the Elephants.
2004	Sinon Bulls	Uni-President Lions	8–6	Tainan City	Capacity audience. Chang Chia-hao hit the winning triple in the ninth inning.
2007	Uni-President Lions	La New Bears	4–2	Kaohsiung County	Capacity audience. Nelson Figueroa became the first player taking three starting wins in CPBL playoff history.
2008	Uni-President 7-Eleven Lions	Brother Elephants	4–0	Tainan City	Capacity audience. Luther Hackman closed the game.
2009	Uni-President 7-Eleven Lions	Brother Elephants	5–2	Tainan City	Capacity audience. Lions win their third consecutive championship.
2015	Lamigo Monkeys	Chinatrust Brothers	11–0	Taoyuan Stadium	Capacity audience. Pat Misch pitched the only no hitter ever in Taiwan Series. Lamigo overcomes a 3–1 series deficit to win their second consecutive championship.

==== Major League Baseball ====
In the Major League Baseball postseason, a game seven can occur in the League Championship Series and the World Series; a game seven cannot occur in the Division Series of the playoff, which are played as best-of-five series nor can it occur in the Wild Card Series, which are played as best-of-three series.

In the World Series, there have been 41 decisive game sevens through the 2025 season; visiting teams have won 22 of those games. Four non-decisive game sevens have been played, in the World Series contested as best-of-nine series (1903, 1919, 1920, 1921); none went to a game nine.

World Series decided by a game seven:

Year	Winning team	Losing team	Score	Site	Notes
1909	Pittsburgh Pirates	Detroit Tigers	8–0	Bennett Park, Detroit	Rookie Babe Adams tosses a six hit shutout for his third win of the series.
1912	Boston Red Sox	New York Giants	3–2 (10)	Fenway Park, Boston	This decisive contest was actually Game 8, as Game 2 had ended in a tie.
1924	Washington Senators	New York Giants	4–3 (12)	Griffith Stadium, Washington, D.C.	Longest game seven in innings. In the 12th, Muddy Ruel doubled after a dropped foul popfly by Giants catcher Hank Gowdy. Ruel scored on a game-winning RBI double by Earl McNeely. Walter Johnson entered into the game on one day's rest in the 9th inning and pitched four scoreless innings.
1925	Pittsburgh Pirates	Washington Senators	9–7	Forbes Field, Pittsburgh	Pittsburgh became the first team in a best-of-seven series to win the series when trailing 3–1.
1926	St. Louis Cardinals	New York Yankees	3–2	Yankee Stadium, The Bronx, New York City	Grover Cleveland Alexander strikes out Tony Lazzeri with the bases loaded to end the seventh and preserve the Cardinals lead. Two innings later Babe Ruth is caught stealing to end the World Series.
1931	St. Louis Cardinals	Philadelphia Athletics	4–2	Sportsman's Park, St. Louis	Last postseason game for the Athletics while based in Philadelphia.
1934	St. Louis Cardinals	Detroit Tigers	11–0	Navin Field, Detroit	Dizzy Dean's second win, a six-hit shutout on one day of rest, gives the Cardinals the title.
1940	Cincinnati Reds	Detroit Tigers	2–1	Crosley Field, Cincinnati	A sacrifice bunt and sacrifice fly scored the winning runs.
1945	Detroit Tigers	Chicago Cubs	9–3	Wrigley Field, Chicago	Cubs last World Series appearance until 2016. See also: Curse of the Billy Goat
1946	St. Louis Cardinals	Boston Red Sox	4–3	Sportsman's Park III, St. Louis	Enos Slaughter's famous mad dash scored the deciding run to win the game and the series.
1947	New York Yankees	Brooklyn Dodgers	5–2	Yankee Stadium, the Bronx, New York City	This was the Series that featured Cookie Lavagetto's pinch-hit that spoiled Bill Bevens' no-hit bid and Al Gionfriddo's catch to rob Joe DiMaggio of a home run.
1952	New York Yankees	Brooklyn Dodgers	4–2	Ebbets Field, Brooklyn, New York City	Billy Martin's game saving infield catch preserves the Yankees lead and helps win the game and the series.
1955	Brooklyn Dodgers	New York Yankees	2–0	Yankee Stadium, the Bronx, New York City	Dodgers' only championship in Brooklyn. The home team won all games of the series except for Game 7.
1956	New York Yankees	Brooklyn Dodgers	9–0	Ebbets Field, Brooklyn, New York	Jackie Robinson's final Major League game. Last postseason game at Ebbets Field and Dodgers' last postseason game before moving to Los Angeles. As in the 1955 World Series, the only game won by the visiting team was Game 7.
1957	Milwaukee Braves	New York Yankees	5–0	Yankee Stadium, the Bronx, New York City	The Braves' only championship in Milwaukee.
1958	New York Yankees	Milwaukee Braves	6–2	County Stadium, Milwaukee	The Yankees overcome a 3–1 deficit. This was the Braves' last postseason game in Milwaukee.
1960	Pittsburgh Pirates	New York Yankees	10–9	Forbes Field, Pittsburgh	Bill Mazeroski hit a walk-off home run to win the Pirates the championship. Last postseason game in Forbes Field. Last postseason game for Yankees' manager Casey Stengel. Highest scoring game 7 in World Series history. As of 2021, this the most recent time that a Pittsburgh sports franchise has clinched a championship in Pittsburgh.
1962	New York Yankees	San Francisco Giants	1–0	Candlestick Park, San Francisco	With runners on second and third and two outs, Willie McCovey's line drive to Bobby Richardson ended the game. First 1–0 game seven score.
1964	St. Louis Cardinals	New York Yankees	7–5	Busch Stadium I, St. Louis, Missouri	Last postseason game at Busch Stadium I.
1965	Los Angeles Dodgers	Minnesota Twins	2–0	Metropolitan Stadium, Bloomington, Minnesota	Pitching through immense pain and on two days rest, Sandy Koufax throws a 3-hit shutout to win the Series and World Series MVP. The home team won all games of the series except for Game 7.
1967	St. Louis Cardinals	Boston Red Sox	7–2	Fenway Park, Boston	Bob Gibson wins his third game of the Series and also homers.
1968	Detroit Tigers	St. Louis Cardinals	4–1	Busch Stadium II, St. Louis, Missouri	Mickey Lolich outduels Bob Gibson for his third win of the Series. The Tigers rallied from a 3–1 deficit to win the series. First Game 7 loss by the Cardinals in the World Series.
1971	Pittsburgh Pirates	Baltimore Orioles	2–1	Memorial Stadium, Baltimore	The home team won all games of the series, except for Game 7.
1972	Oakland Athletics	Cincinnati Reds	3–2	Riverfront Stadium, Cincinnati	The A's first championship in Oakland.
1973	Oakland Athletics	New York Mets	5–2	Oakland–Alameda County Coliseum, Oakland, California	Bert Campaneris and Reggie Jackson hit the only Oakland home runs in this game to set the tone for victory and the series.
1975	Cincinnati Reds	Boston Red Sox	4–3	Fenway Park, Boston	One night after Carlton Fisk's famous home run, the Reds rebound to take the Series, overcoming a 3–0 deficit with two runs in the 6th and runs in the 7th and 9th inning.
1979	Pittsburgh Pirates	Baltimore Orioles	4–1	Memorial Stadium, Baltimore	The Pittsburgh Pirates, powered by NLCS and World Series MVP Willie Stargell, rally from a 3–1 deficit to win the series. The Pirates were the last team to win a game seven on the road until 2014.
1982	St. Louis Cardinals	Milwaukee Brewers	6–3	Busch Stadium II, St. Louis	Joaquín Andújar earns his second win of the Series and Bruce Sutter his second save.
1985	Kansas City Royals	St. Louis Cardinals	11–0	Royals Stadium, Kansas City, Missouri	The Royals also won the 1985 American League Championship Series in seven games, becoming the first team to win two game sevens in the same postseason. Royals became first team to win the World Series after losing the first two games at home. The Royals were the last team to come back from 3–1 down to win a title in any of the five major men's professional sports leagues until the Cleveland Cavaliers won the 2016 NBA Finals after trailing 3–1. The Royals are so far the only team to come back from 3–1 deficits to win both their League Championship Series and the World Series in the same MLB postseason.
1986	New York Mets	Boston Red Sox	8–5	Shea Stadium, Flushing, Queens, New York	Mets become the first team to be one strike away from elimination and come back to win the World Series. Bill Buckner's infamous 10th-inning fielding error at first base allowed the Mets to win Game 6 in a walk-off and force Game 7.
1987	Minnesota Twins	St. Louis Cardinals	4–2	Hubert H. Humphrey Metrodome, Minneapolis	The home team won all 7 games of the series for the first time in MLB history.
1991	Minnesota Twins	Atlanta Braves	1–0 (10)	Hubert H. Humphrey Metrodome, Minneapolis	As in 1987, the home team won all games of the series. The Twins won in the bottom of the 10th on a walk-off single by Gene Larkin scoring Dan Gladden after 9 1/2 scoreless innings of play. Jack Morris goes all ten innings for the Twins and is named the Series MVP. Twins centerfielder Kirby Puckett hit a famous walk-off home run in the bottom of the eleventh inning of the previous night's game to force this decisive game.
1997	Florida Marlins	Cleveland Indians	3–2 (11)	Pro Player Stadium, Miami Gardens, Florida	Florida becomes the first wild card team to win the World Series. The Marlins rallied for one run in the bottom of the ninth to tie and won in the eleventh on an Édgar Rentería RBI single off Charles Nagy.
2001	Arizona Diamondbacks	New York Yankees	3–2	Bank One Ballpark, Phoenix, Arizona	Arizona rallied for two runs in the bottom of the ninth for a come-from-behind win, capped off by Luis Gonzalez hitting the winning RBI single off closer Mariano Rivera. As in both 1987 and 1991, the home team won all games of the series.
2002	Anaheim Angels	San Francisco Giants	4–1	Edison International Field, Anaheim, California	John Lackey became the second rookie pitcher to win a World Series game seven.
2011	St. Louis Cardinals	Texas Rangers	6–2	Busch Stadium, St. Louis, Missouri	Cardinals became the second team to be one strike away from elimination and come back to win the series, which they did twice. Just like the 1991 series, a walk-off home run in the bottom of the eleventh inning of game six, forced this decisive game with David Freese providing the firepower. Most recent Game 7 won by the home team.
2014	San Francisco Giants	Kansas City Royals	3–2	Kauffman Stadium, Kansas City, Missouri	The Giants became the first NL team to win a game seven on the road since 1979. NLCS MVP and eventual World Series MVP Madison Bumgarner, normally a starter, pitched five scoreless innings of relief on two days rest to save the Giants' third title in five years.
2016	Chicago Cubs	Cleveland Indians	8–7 (10)	Progressive Field, Cleveland, Ohio	Chicago Cubs' first World Series win since 1908. Game played between the two teams (Cleveland Indians and Chicago Cubs) with the longest active championship droughts. Dexter Fowler the first player ever to lead off a World Series Game 7 with a home run. The Cubs are the first Major League Baseball team to come back from a 3–1 series deficit to win the World Series since the 1985 Royals and the first since the 1979 Pirates to do so by winning Games 6 & 7 on the road. First extra-innings game seven to be won by the road team.
2017	Houston Astros	Los Angeles Dodgers	5–1	Dodger Stadium, Los Angeles	First instance of back-to-back game sevens since 2001–2002. First World Series championship for the Astros, who became the first AL team to win a World Series Game 7 on the road since 1972. The Astros became the second team to win two winner-take-all game sevens in the same postseason since the Kansas City Royals in 1985. First major professional sports championship in Houston since 1995.
2019	Washington Nationals	Houston Astros	6–2	Minute Maid Park, Houston	This is the first best-of-seven postseason series in any of the major North American sports where the visiting team won all seven games. This was the Nationals' first World Series win and the first time a Washington-based team won the World Series since 1924.
2025	Los Angeles Dodgers	Toronto Blue Jays	5–4 (11)	Rogers Centre, Toronto	Los Angeles overcame a 3–0 deficit, with Miguel Rojas tying the game on his home run in the 9th before Will Smith gave Los Angeles the lead on the first ever extra-inning home run in a Game 7 with his home run in the 11th. The Dodgers became the fifth straight road team to win Game 7 of a World Series. Most recent World Series game seven to be decided in extra innings. Second extra-innings game seven to be won by the road team.

=== Basketball ===
==== National Basketball Association ====
All playoff rounds in the National Basketball League (NBA) are now in a best-of-seven series format so all rounds can have a maximum of seven games. The NBA Finals has been consistently played in a best-of-seven series format since its inception. The game sevens where the championship was awarded:

Year	Winning team	Losing team	Score	Site	Notes
1951	Rochester Royals	New York Knicks	79–75	Edgerton Park Arena, Rochester, New York	New York forced a game seven after trailing 0–3 in the series.
1952	Minneapolis Lakers	New York Knicks	82–65	Minneapolis Auditorium, Minneapolis	The teams alternated wins throughout the series.
1954	Minneapolis Lakers	Syracuse Nationals	87–70	Minneapolis Auditorium, Minneapolis	The teams alternated wins throughout the series.
1955	Syracuse Nationals	Fort Wayne Pistons	92–91	Onondaga County War Memorial, Syracuse, New York	The home team won all games of this series.
1957	Boston Celtics	St. Louis Hawks	125–123 (2OT)	Boston Garden, Boston	Only game seven in NBA history to go into two overtimes.
1960	Boston Celtics	St. Louis Hawks	122–103	Boston Garden, Boston	The teams alternated wins throughout the series. Last time the NBA Finals were played in March.
1962	Boston Celtics	Los Angeles Lakers	110–107 (OT)	Boston Garden, Boston	Most recent NBA Finals game seven to go into overtime.
1966	Boston Celtics	Los Angeles Lakers	95–93	Boston Garden, Boston	Last NBA Finals until 2016 that a team down 3–1 rallied to force a game seven.
1969	Boston Celtics	Los Angeles Lakers	108–106	The Forum, Inglewood, California	Final game for Celtics Bill Russell and Sam Jones. Jerry West was Finals MVP, the first time the award was given, and only time it has gone to a player on the losing team.
1970	New York Knicks	Los Angeles Lakers	113–99	Madison Square Garden, Manhattan, New York City	Notable for Willis Reed's return from injury. The teams alternated wins throughout the series.
1974	Boston Celtics	Milwaukee Bucks	102–87	MECCA Arena, Milwaukee	The final four games were each won by the road team.
1978	Washington Bullets	Seattle SuperSonics	105–99	Seattle Center Coliseum, Seattle	Last NBA Finals game seven won by the away team until 2016.
1984	Boston Celtics	Los Angeles Lakers	111–102	Boston Garden, Boston	Last NBA Finals until 2014 that followed a 2–2–1–1–1 format.
1988	Los Angeles Lakers	Detroit Pistons	108–105	The Forum, Inglewood, California	Second consecutive championship for Los Angeles. Coach Pat Riley had promised fans a repeat during the prior season's championship celebration.
1994	Houston Rockets	New York Knicks	90–84	The Summit, Houston	Pat Riley became the first head coach to appear in an NBA Finals game seven with two different teams (Lakers in 1984 and 1988, Knicks in 1994).
2005	San Antonio Spurs	Detroit Pistons	81–74	SBC Center, San Antonio	Detroit was attempting to repeat as champions, having defeated the Lakers in the prior season's NBA Finals.
2010	Los Angeles Lakers	Boston Celtics	83–79	Staples Center, Los Angeles	Fifth time that the Celtics and Lakers met in a game 7. Kobe Bryant won his second consecutive Finals MVP award, scoring 10 of his game high 23 points in the fourth quarter, as well as grabbing 15 rebounds to clinch the victory for the Lakers.
2013	Miami Heat	San Antonio Spurs	95–88	American Airlines Arena, Miami	Third consecutive NBA Finals for Miami, and their second consecutive championship. Last NBA Finals to use a 2–3–2 format.
2016	Cleveland Cavaliers	Golden State Warriors	93–89	Oracle Arena, Oakland, California	First away team to win game 7 of the NBA Finals since 1978. The Cavaliers also became the first team in the four major men's professional sports leagues to come back from 3–1 down in a championship round since the 1985 Kansas City Royals and first team ever to do so in the NBA Finals. First major professional sports championship in Cleveland since 1964.
2025	Oklahoma City Thunder	Indiana Pacers	103–91	Paycom Center, Oklahoma City	Oklahoma City Thunder win first NBA championship since relocating from Seattle. Youngest team since the 1977 Portland Trail Blazers to win an NBA championship.

=== Ice hockey ===
==== Kontinental Hockey League ====
In the Kontinental Hockey League (KHL) playoffs, game seven can occur in all playoff series. The KHL playoffs' final series, the Gagarin Cup Final, has seen five series decided in game seven.

The game sevens where the Gagarin Cup was awarded are:

Year	Winning team	Losing team	Score	Site	Notes
2009	Ak Bars Kazan	Lokomotiv Yaroslavl	1–0	TatNeft Arena, Kazan	Inaugural season for the Kontinental Hockey League after it was reorganized from the former Russian Superleague.
2010	Ak Bars Kazan	HC MVD	0–2	Balashikha Arena, Balashikha	
2012	HC Dynamo Moscow	Avangard Omsk	0–1	Arena Omsk, Omsk	
2014	Metallurg Magnitogorsk	HC Lev Praha	7–4	Arena Metallurg, Magnitogorsk	
2016	Metallurg Magnitogorsk	HC CSKA Moscow	1–3	CSKA Arena, Moscow	

==== Liiga ====
In Liiga (or Finnish Elite League) playoffs, game seven can occur in all playoff series except the wild-card rounds. The Liiga playoffs' final series has seen several series decided in game seven.

The game sevens where Liiga awarded gold medals and the Kanada-malja include:

Year	Winning team	Losing team	Score	Site	Notes
2014	Oulun Kärpät	Tappara	1–0 (OT)	Oulun Energia Areena, Oulu	
2015	Oulun Kärpät	Tappara	2–1 (2OT)	Oulun Energia Areena, Oulu	
2019	HPK	Oulun Kärpät	2–1 (OT)	Oulun Energia Areena, Oulu	
2026	Tappara	KooKoo	2–1	Nokia Arena, Tampere	

==== National Hockey League ====
In the National Hockey League's (NHL) Stanley Cup playoffs, game seven can occur in all playoff series. The Stanley Cup became the NHL's de facto championship trophy in 1926, and the league instituted the best-of-seven series starting in the 1938–39 season. No Stanley Cup Final game seven has ever ended with a 1–0 score.

The game sevens where the Stanley Cup was awarded are:

Year	Winning team	Losing team	Score	Site	Notes
1942	Toronto Maple Leafs	Detroit Red Wings	3–1	Maple Leaf Gardens, Toronto, Ontario	Toronto came back down 0–3 in the series to win the Stanley Cup. The Leafs were the first team in North American professional sports to win a playoff series after trailing 0–3. It remains the only time in the Stanley Cup Final where a team won a championship series after trailing 0–3.
1945	Toronto Maple Leafs	Detroit Red Wings	2–1	Olympia Stadium, Detroit	Detroit was down 0–3 in the series and rallied to force game seven before losing.
1950	Detroit Red Wings	New York Rangers	4–3 (2OT)	Olympia Stadium, Detroit	Longest game seven in a Stanley Cup Final.
1954	Detroit Red Wings	Montreal Canadiens	2–1 (OT)	Olympia Stadium, Detroit	Most recent Stanley Cup Final game seven to be decided in overtime.
1955	Detroit Red Wings	Montreal Canadiens	3–1	Olympia Stadium, Detroit	Red Wings' last Stanley Cup victory until 1997. The home team won all games of the series.
1964	Toronto Maple Leafs	Detroit Red Wings	4–0	Maple Leaf Gardens, Toronto, Ontario	First game seven that ended in a shutout.
1965	Montreal Canadiens	Chicago Black Hawks	4–0	Montreal Forum, Montreal	The home team won all games of the series.
1971	Montreal Canadiens	Chicago Black Hawks	3–2	Chicago Stadium, Chicago	The home team won all games of the series except for game seven. Chicago led 2–0 in the deciding game at home before allowing three unanswered goals and losing the game.
1987	Edmonton Oilers	Philadelphia Flyers	3–1	Northlands Coliseum, Edmonton, Alberta	Flyers rallied from a 3–1 series deficit to force a decisive game, but lost.
1994	New York Rangers	Vancouver Canucks	3–2	Madison Square Garden, Manhattan, New York City	Canucks represented Canada's last Stanley Cup Final appearance until 2004 Calgary Flames. Rangers won their first Stanley Cup since 1940.
2001	Colorado Avalanche	New Jersey Devils	3–1	Pepsi Center, Denver, Colorado	Long-time Boston Bruins captain Ray Bourque won the Stanley Cup in the last of his 22 seasons in the NHL.
2003	New Jersey Devils	Mighty Ducks of Anaheim	3–0	Continental Airlines Arena, East Rutherford, New Jersey	The home team won all games of the series. This was Ken Daneyko's final playing season with New Jersey, as he retired after the Devils' Cup win.
2004	Tampa Bay Lightning	Calgary Flames	2–1	St. Pete Times Forum, Tampa, Florida	Lightning captain Dave Andreychuk won his Stanley Cup after 22 seasons.
2006	Carolina Hurricanes	Edmonton Oilers	3–1	RBC Center, Raleigh, North Carolina	First Stanley Cup Final featuring two former World Hockey Association teams. The Hurricanes became the first Stanley Cup champion to miss the playoffs in the previous season and the following season. This was Rod Brind'Amour's first and only Stanley Cup in his 21-year playing career.
2009	Pittsburgh Penguins	Detroit Red Wings	2–1	Joe Louis Arena, Detroit	The home team won all games of the series, except for game seven. First time the away team won game seven of a championship round, in any major professional sport, since the 1979 World Series.
2011	Boston Bruins	Vancouver Canucks	4–0	Rogers Arena, Vancouver	The home team won all games of the series, except for game seven. Not only does Boston became the first city to win all four major sports championships in the 21st century, but also Vancouver failed to become the third city to win the Stanley Cup after hosting the Olympic Games the previous year.
2019	St. Louis Blues	Boston Bruins	4–1	TD Garden, Boston	St. Louis becomes the last of the five surviving teams from the 1967 NHL expansion to win the Stanley Cup. Jordan Binnington becomes the first rookie goaltender to register 16 postseason wins in NHL history. The road team won five of the seven games of the series, except for games one and four. This is also the first championship for a team based in St. Louis since 2011.
2024	Florida Panthers	Edmonton Oilers	2–1	Amerant Bank Arena, Sunrise, Florida	Florida won the first three games of the series by a combined score of 11–4. Edmonton rallied back from a 3–0 series deficit, forcing a seventh game in the series in which they had the opportunity to overcome the deficit. However, Florida avoided a historic reverse sweep and won the last game of the series at home. This marked the first time that the home team had won a game seven of a championship round since the 2013 NBA Finals, which was coincidentally the last time that a team based in the Miami area won a championship up to that point.

== Defunct major leagues ==
The American Basketball Association and World Hockey Association, major leagues that saw teams that later merged with the National Basketball Association and National Hockey League, respectively, each had playoff seasons that saw teams play a decisive seventh game.

=== American Basketball Association ===
In the first ABA Playoffs in 1968, the Division Semifinals was a best-of-five format, which saw two of the four matchups go to the fifth game. In total, Game 7 was played nineteen times in ABA history.

Year	Winning team	Losing team	Score	Site	Notes
1968	Pittsburgh Pipers	New Orleans Buccaneers	122–113	Civic Arena, Pittsburgh	Charlie Williams led all scorers with 35 points as Pittsburgh won the inaugural ABA Finals.
1969	Oakland Oaks	Denver Rockets	115–102	Oakland–Alameda County Coliseum Arena, Oakland, California	The teams alternated wins throughout the series.
1969	New Orleans Buccaneers	Dallas Chaparrals	101–95	Loyola Field House, New Orleans	Dallas forced Game 7 after winning Game 5 and Game 6.
1969	Indiana Pacers	Kentucky Colonels	120–111	Indiana State Fairgrounds Coliseum, Indianapolis	Indiana became the first (and only) ABA team to win a playoff series after being down 3–1.
1969	Miami Floridians	Minnesota Pipers	137–128	Miami Beach Auditorium, Miami Beach, Florida	Donnie Freeman led all scorers with 32 points.
1970	Denver Rockets	Washington Caps	143–119	Denver Auditorium Arena, Denver	Rick Barry scored 52 points, the most points scored in a Game 7 in NBA/ABA history.
1970	Kentucky Colonels	New York Nets	112–101	Louisville Convention Center, Louisville, Kentucky	
1971	Utah Stars	Indiana Pacers	108–101	Indiana State Fairgrounds Coliseum, Indianapolis	Indiana forced Game 7 after being down 3–1 but Utah became first team to win a Game 7 on the road.
1971	Utah Stars	Kentucky Colonels	131–127	Salt Palace, Salt Lake City	Home team won every game of the series. Utah won their first (and so far only) professional basketball championship.
1972	Indiana Pacers	Denver Rockets	91–89	Indiana State Fairgrounds Coliseum, Indianapolis	Teams alternated victories in the series.
1972	Indiana Pacers	Utah Stars	117–113	Salt Palace, Salt Lake City	Road team won Game 7, with Indiana getting revenge on Utah.
1972	New York Nets	Virginia Squires	94–88	Norfolk Scope, Norfolk, Virginia	Series lasted three weeks with a nine-day gap between Game 2 and 3 due to venue scheduling issues.
1973	Kentucky Colonels	Carolina Cougars	107–96	Charlotte Coliseum, Charlotte, North Carolina	
1973	Indiana Pacers	Kentucky Colonels	88–81	Freedom Hall, Louisville, Kentucky	Indiana won on the road for their third and last ABA championship.
1974	Indiana Pacers	San Antonio Spurs	86–79	Indiana State Fairgrounds Coliseum, Indianapolis	Pacers trailed 42–29 at halftime.
1974	Utah Stars	Indiana Pacers	109–87	Salt Palace, Salt Lake City	Indiana forced a Game 7 after being down 3–0 before the Stars won.
1975	Indiana Pacers	Denver Nuggets	104–96	Denver Auditorium Arena, Denver	
1976	New York Nets	San Antonio Spurs	121–114	Nassau Coliseum, Uniondale, New York	Nets went on a 17–4 with the game tied late to win the series.
1976	Denver Nuggets	Kentucky Colonels	133–110	McNichols Sports Arena, Denver	Teams alternated victories in the series. Final game of the Colonels, who did not join the NBA with the merger of the ABA and NBA.

=== World Hockey Association ===
The 1976 WHA playoffs, the only postseason the league had with ten playoff teams, had two Preliminary Rounds with a best-of-five format, and one of them (Phoenix–San Diego) went the full five games.

Year	Winning team	Losing team	Score	Site	Notes
1974	Chicago Cougars	New England Whalers	3–2	Eastern States Coliseum, West Springfield	Trailing 2-1 in the third period with ten minutes to play, Ralph Backstrom and Jan Popiel each scored goals for Chicago to lift them over New England.
1974	Chicago Cougars	Toronto Toros	5–2	Maple Leaf Gardens, Toronto, Ontario	Cougars had four goal-scorers in the second period as they once again defeated a team on the road.
1976	New England Whalers	Indianapolis Racers	6–0	Market Square Arena, Indianapolis	By winning Game 7 after losing Game 5 and 6, New England narrowly avoided losing a series after leading 3-1; series was won on the road.
1976	Houston Aeros	New England Whalers	2–0	The Summit, Houston	Poul Popiel scores go-ahead goal at 7:49 in the first period.
1977	Winnipeg Jets	San Diego Mariners	7–3	Winnipeg Arena, Winnipeg, Manitoba	The home team won every game of the series as five different Jets players score goals, with Anders Hedberg and Bobby Hull leading the way with two each.
1977	Quebec Nordiques	Winnipeg Jets	8–2	Colisée de Québec, Quebec City, Quebec	Quebec won the Avco World Trophy in the only championship final to go seven games with a six-goal second period.
1979	Edmonton Oilers	New England Whalers	6–3	Northlands Coliseum, Edmonton, Alberta	Home team won every game of the WHA Semifinals. Oilers score four goals in the second period, with two coming from Wayne Gretzky.

== Comebacks ==
This table below lists teams that, after being down three games to none, have forced a seventh game.

More common, and not enumerated here, are teams that have forced and won a seventh game after being down three games to one.

=== Successful ===
In only ten instances (five in major North American sports leagues) has a team been able to come back from being down 0–3 to win a series:

Series	Winning team	Losing team	Sports league
1942 Stanley Cup Final	Toronto Maple Leafs	Detroit Red Wings	NHL
1958 Japan Series	Nishitetsu Lions	Yomiuri Giants	Nippon Professional Baseball
1975 Stanley Cup Quarterfinals	New York Islanders	Pittsburgh Penguins	NHL
1989 Japan Series	Yomiuri Giants	Kintetsu Buffaloes	Nippon Professional Baseball
2004 American League Championship Series	Boston Red Sox	New York Yankees	MLB
2010 Stanley Cup Eastern Conference Semifinals	Philadelphia Flyers	Boston Bruins	NHL
2012 Liiga Quarter-finals	Espoo Blues	KalPa	Liiga
2014 Stanley Cup Western Conference Quarterfinals	Los Angeles Kings	San Jose Sharks	NHL
2015 Gagarin Cup Western Conference Finals	SKA St. Petersburg	CSKA Moscow	Kontinental Hockey League
2015–16 PBA Philippine Cup Finals	San Miguel Beermen	Alaska Aces	Philippine Basketball Association

Mike Richards and Jeff Carter are the only players to have been a part of two comebacks from being down 0–3, having played for both the 2009–10 Philadelphia Flyers and the 2013–14 Los Angeles Kings.

=== Unsuccessful ===
In the following sixteen instances, teams were able to force a seventh game in a series after being down 0–3, but lost the final game:

Series	Winning team	Losing team	Sports league
1939 Stanley Cup Semifinals	Boston Bruins	New York Rangers	NHL
1945 Stanley Cup Final	Toronto Maple Leafs	Detroit Red Wings	NHL
1951 NBA Finals	Rochester Royals	New York Knicks	NBA
1974 ABA Western Division Finals	Utah Stars	Indiana Pacers	ABA
1975 Stanley Cup Semifinals	Philadelphia Flyers	New York Islanders	NHL
1976 Japan Series	Hankyu Braves	Yomiuri Giants	Nippon Professional Baseball
1994 NBA Western Conference Semifinals	Utah Jazz	Denver Nuggets	NBA
2003 NBA Western Conference First Round	Dallas Mavericks	Portland Trail Blazers	NBA
2011 Stanley Cup Western Conference Quarterfinals	Vancouver Canucks	Chicago Blackhawks	NHL
2011 Stanley Cup Western Conference Semifinals	San Jose Sharks	Detroit Red Wings	NHL
2014 Liiga Quarterfinals	SaiPa	JYP	Liiga
2015 Kelly Cup Eastern Conference Finals	South Carolina Stingrays	Toledo Walleye	ECHL (ice hockey)
2020 American League Championship Series	Tampa Bay Rays	Houston Astros	MLB
2023 NBA Eastern Conference Finals	Miami Heat	Boston Celtics	NBA
2024 Liiga Quarterfinals	Pelicans	HIFK	Liiga
2024 Stanley Cup Final	Florida Panthers	Edmonton Oilers	NHL

The New York Islanders are the only team to have twice fallen behind 0–3 and then forced a game seven in the same postseason; in the 1975 Stanley Cup Quarterfinals (which they won) and then the 1975 Stanley Cup Semifinals (which they lost).

=== Major sports leagues ===
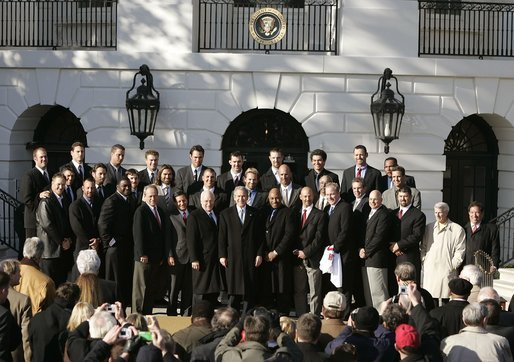
The 2004 Boston Red Sox, seen here at the White House, are one of just two teams in Major League Baseball to force a game seven after being down 3–0, and the only team to win a game 7 after being down 3–0.

This table summarizes the above results for the three major sports leagues in North America that play seven-game series:

Summary of comebacks by major sports league
Sports league	Forced game 7s after 3–0 deficit	Game 7 wins	Game 7 losses
NBA	4 (1 in NBA finals)	0 (0)	4 (1)
NHL	10 (3 in Stanley Cup Final)	4 (1)	6 (2)
MLB	2 (never in World Series)	1 (–)	1 (–)
