= Humenyuk =

Humenyuk or Gumenyuk (Ukrainian: Гуменюк), traditionally transliterated as Humeniuk, Gumeniuk or Goumeniouk, is a Ukrainian surname. The Humenyuk surname may refer to:

- Irina Gumenyuk (born 1988), Russian triple jumper
- Kateryna Humenyuk (known as Assol, born 1994), Ukrainian singer
- Marianne Humeniuk (1947–2014), Canadian swimmer
- Natalia Humeniuk (soldier), spokesperson for the Defense Forces of Southern Ukraine
- Nataliya Gumenyuk (born 1983), Ukrainian journalist
- Oleh Humenyuk (born 1983), Ukrainian football midfielder
- Oleksandr Humenyuk (1976–2025), Ukrainian football coach and player
- Pawlo Humeniuk (1883–1965), Ukrainian-American fiddler
- Scott Humeniuk (born 1969), retired professional ice hockey player
- Vasyl Humenyuk (born 1946), Ukrainian politician
- Walter Humeniuk (1929–1987), goaltender for the Detroit Red Wings and the Chicago Black Hawks
