= Jim McFadden =

Irish-born Canadian ice hockey player

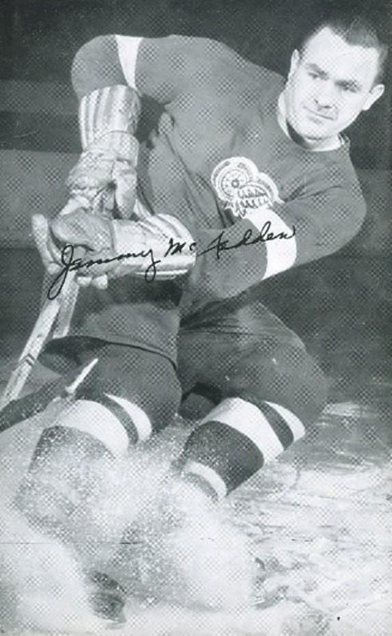
- McFadden in 1947 postcard
- Born: April 15, 1920 Belfast, Ireland
- Died: August 22, 2002 (aged 82) Winnipeg, Manitoba, Canada
- Height: 5 ft 7 in (170 cm)
- Weight: 178 lb (81 kg; 12 st 10 lb)
- Position: Centre
- Shot: Left
- Played for: Detroit Red Wings; Chicago Black Hawks
- Playing career: 1946–1954

James Alexander McFadden (April 15, 1920 – August 22, 2002) was a Canadian professional ice hockey forward. He was born in Belfast, United Kingdom and raised in Darlingford, Manitoba, in the Opawaka district. One of six players born in Ireland to play in the National Hockey League, McFadden played for the Detroit Red Wings and Chicago Black Hawks between 1947 and 1954, as well as several years in different minor leagues. He is the uncle of Bill Mikkelson, and the great-uncle of Bill's son, Brendan and daughter Meaghan.

== Playing career ==
McFadden started his career with the Portland Buckaroos of the Pacific Coast Hockey League. He spent two years with the Buckaroos before joining the Montreal Sr. Canadiens in the Quebec Senior Hockey League in 1941–42. In 1942–43, McFadden joined the Canadian Army. He was posted to Winnipeg and played hockey with the Winnipeg Army. After three years in the army, McFadden rejoined the QSHL, but this time with the Ottawa Senators. McFadden contributed a significant number of points and in 1946–47 he was traded to the Buffalo Bisons of the American Hockey League.

After averaging over a point with the Bisons in the AHL, he was signed to the National Hockey League by the Detroit Red Wings during their playoff run in 1946–47. The Red Wings ended up being beaten by the Toronto Maple Leafs in five games, but McFadden's two points during the playoffs helped give him another chance on the roster for next season. McFadden ended up scoring 24 goals during his rookie season and this helped him win the Calder Memorial Trophy. He is the second-oldest player ever to have won the award, having done so at the age of 27. He remained in Detroit for three more seasons, where he won the Stanley Cup in 1950, and was selected for the 1950 NHL All-Star Game.

On August 20, 1951, McFadden was traded to the Chicago Black Hawks with teammates George Gee, Max McNab, Jimmy Peters, Clare Martin and Rags Raglan in exchange for $75,000 and future considerations. McFadden played in Chicago for three seasons. He played in 19 games during the 1953–54 season, before being sent down to the minors. He played another three seasons in the minors with the Calgary Stampeders before retiring.

== Awards and achievements ==
- Calder Memorial Trophy winner (1948).
- Played in NHL All-Star Game (1950).
- Stanley Cup championship (1950).
- Inducted into the Manitoba Sports Hall of Fame and Museum in 2004.
- Honored Member of the Manitoba Hockey Hall of Fame.

== Career statistics ==
=== Regular season and playoffs ===
			Regular season					Playoffs
Season	Team	League	GP	G	A	Pts	PIM	GP	G	A	Pts	PIM
1939–40	Carman Beavers	AIHA	—	—	—	—	—	—	—	—	—	—
1939–40	Portland Buckaroos	PCHL	6	2	1	3	6	4	3	1	4	0
1940–41	Portland Buckaroos	PCHL	47	20	14	34	37	—	—	—	—	—
1941–42	Montreal Sr. Canadiens	QSHL	27	8	6	14	12	5	0	1	1	4
1942–43	Winnipeg Army	WNDHL	12	14	10	24	6	—	—	—	—	—
1942–43	Port Arthur Navy	Al-Cup	—	—	—	—	—	2	2	6	8	4
1943–44	Winnipeg Army	WNDHL	8	7	2	9	2	—	—	—	—	—
1944–45	Winnipeg Army	WNDHL	17	20	21	41	16	2	0	1	1	2
1944–45	Winnipeg Army	Al-Cup	—	—	—	—	—	7	3	3	6	6
1945–46	Ottawa Senators	QSHL	30	25	32	57	57	9	1	8	9	6
1946–47	Ottawa Senators	QSHL	16	17	17	34	2	—	—	—	—	—
1946–47	Buffalo Bisons	AHL	31	19	15	34	37	4	2	0	2	2
1946–47	Detroit Red Wings	NHL	—	—	—	—	—	4	0	2	2	0
1947–48	Detroit Red Wings	NHL	60	24	24	48	12	10	5	3	8	10
1948–49	Detroit Red Wings	NHL	55	12	20	32	10	8	0	1	1	6
1949–50	Detroit Red Wings	NHL	68	14	16	30	8	14	2	3	5	8
1950–51	Detroit Red Wings	NHL	70	14	18	32	10	6	0	0	0	2
1951–52	Chicago Black Hawks	NHL	70	10	24	34	14	—	—	—	—	—
1952–53	Chicago Black Hawks	NHL	70	23	21	44	29	7	3	0	3	4
1953–54	Chicago Black Hawks	NHL	19	3	3	6	6	—	—	—	—	—
1953–54	Calgary Stampeders	WHL	37	27	28	55	16	18	10	12	22	4
1953–54	Calgary Stampeders	Ed-Cup	—	—	—	—	—	7	3	3	6	0
1954–55	Calgary Stampeders	WHL	56	31	34	65	36	8	5	4	9	7
1955–56	Calgary Stampeders	WHL	64	23	37	60	26	8	4	4	8	4
1956–57	Calgary Stampeders	WHL	9	3	5	8	8	—	—	—	—	—
NHL totals			412	100	126	226	89	49	10	9	19	30

Preceded by Howie Meeker	Winner of the Calder Memorial Trophy; 1948	Succeeded by Pentti Lund
