= Tseng Wen-chin random killing case =

2012 murder in Taiwan

Tseng Wen-chin random murder case
- Location: 22°59′N 120°11′E; Republic of China (Taiwan), No. 412, Section 1, Jinhua Road, South District, Tainan
- Date: 1 December 2012; 09:18 (UTC+8)
- Attack type: Stabbing attack
- Weapon: Knife
- Deaths: 1
- Victim: Fang Yuchao (7 June 2002 – 1 December 2012)
- Perpetrator: Tseng Wen-chin

Also known as the Tom's World throat-slashing case, the Tseng Wen-chin random killing case was a random murder that occurred at 09:18 (UTC+8) on 1 December 2012 in Tainan, Taiwan. The perpetrator was Tseng Wen-chin (born 1982). The incident was regarded as the second random killing case in Taiwan's criminal history.

== Background and course of events ==
=== Before the attack ===
Tseng Wen-chin did not continue his education after graduating from elementary school. His parents divorced when he was 12 years old. After entering the workforce, he was surrounded mainly by adult co-workers and had few peers of his own age. From then on, he became withdrawn, rarely interacted with others, and seldom communicated with his family. He had a long history of depression, agitation, anxiety, and neurotic depression.

Prior to the crime, Tseng rented a small apartment near a market on Daxing Street in North District, Tainan. For years, he supported himself through temporary jobs and lived in poverty.

=== The attack ===
At about 08:00 on 1 December 2012, a boy surnamed Fang and a boy surnamed Li, who were classmates, went to the Tom's World arcade on Section 1, Jinhua Road in South District, Tainan, to play video games.

At 08:27, Tseng entered the arcade and played games while observing the surroundings. At 09:16, he went to the restroom to inspect the layout. After staying there for about 20 seconds, he returned to the lobby in search of a target. He noticed the two boys playing arcade games near the entrance and approached them. Tseng first attempted to strike up a conversation with Li, who ignored him. He then turned to Fang and spoke to him in the same manner. Fang, unsuspecting, followed him.

At 09:18, Tseng lured Fang into the men's restroom and used a folding knife he had prepared beforehand to stab the child in the neck. The attack severed the boy's carotid artery and cut his trachea.At 09:20, Tseng calmly left the arcade and fled on a scooter. At 09:28, a cleaner entered the men's restroom and found Fang lying on his back inside a stall, prompting a report to the police.

=== After the attack ===
After committing the murder, Tseng returned to his rented apartment, changed out of the bloodstained clothes, removed his motorcycle license plate, and went to an internet café attached to a shrimp-fishing establishment called "Sihai Shrimp Fishing Farm", where he slept in a private booth. At 18:20 that evening, police discovered his scooter downstairs and arrested him inside the establishment.

Following his arrest, Tseng stated:

I checked online before committing the crime. In Taiwan, killing one or two people wouldn't result in the death penalty. Spending the rest of my life in prison would be enough.

He also said:

If I hadn't been caught today, I would have continued killing people until I was arrested.

However, during the trial, Tseng told psychiatric evaluators that he had actually committed the murder in an attempt to achieve suicide by execution. He stated:

If I failed, I wouldn't be sentenced to death. I never wanted to live off free prison meals. If I just wanted that, I could have committed theft or robbery. I killed because I wanted to die, since my previous suicide attempts had all failed.

He further explained that his earlier remarks about not receiving the death penalty for killing one or two people were intended to make himself appear more evil and increase the likelihood of being executed.

Medical records showed that when Tseng visited Tainan Hospital in 2008, he had already discussed his suicidal tendencies and previous suicide attempts with physicians, and these conversations were documented.

=== Reactions and impact ===
The incident was regarded as the second random killing case in Taiwan's criminal history. Because the victim was a 10-year-old elementary school boy, the case attracted widespread attention across Taiwanese society. After his arrest, Tseng Wen-chin stated, "I looked it up online before committing the crime. Nowadays in Taiwan, killing one or two people won't result in the death penalty. Spending the rest of my life in prison would be enough." He further stated, "If I had not been caught today, I would have continued killing people until I was arrested."

These remarks sparked widespread public outrage and reignited debate over the abolition of capital punishment. Lawyer Lin Shih-meng commented, "He has indeed pointed out the reality of Taiwan's judicial practice. Not only are murderers rarely sentenced to death, but even finalized death sentences are often not carried out. Taiwan's judiciary has much to reflect upon." Wang Wei-chun, chairwoman of the Children's Rights Promotion Association of the Republic of China, visited the victim's father and launched an online petition with association members. She stated that if 100,000 signatures could be gathered within a week, she would submit the petition to the Ministry of Justice (Taiwan), urging that Tseng be sentenced to death and the sentence carried out.

Many critics directed their anger toward the Taiwan Alliance to End the Death Penalty. The organization maintained that carrying out executions would not solve the underlying problems. Its executive director, Lin Hsin-yi, argued that Tseng's crime was ultimately society's responsibility and that efforts should focus on improving social conditions and reducing crime rather than punishing offenders who kill children. She further stated that the case strengthened her resolve to advocate for the abolition of capital punishment and the protection of offenders. Responding to criticism that taxpayers should not support death row inmates, she argued that prisoners in Taiwan perform labor to cover meal expenses and that prison revenues contribute to the Crime Victims Protection Fund. Television personality Lucifer Chu cited figures published by the United Daily News and argued that Taiwan's prison system operated at a deficit and depended on state funding, accusing Lin of misleading the public. Online commentators also criticized Lin's view that Tseng, rather than the victim, represented a socially vulnerable group deserving greater sympathy. After Lin urged the public not to "bully the vulnerable", many netizens reacted angrily, asking, "Is a child murderer really the vulnerable one? Please stop repeating the same arguments."

On 21 December 2012, the Ministry of Justice (Taiwan) approved the executions of six death row inmates—Tseng Szu-ju, Hung Ming-tsung, Huang Hsien-cheng, Chen Chin-huo, Kuang Te-chiang, and Tai Te-ying. The decision was widely considered to have been influenced by the public reaction to the case.

The Tainan City Electronic Game Arcade Establishment Self-Government Ordinance, passed by the Tainan City Council in June 2012 and implemented by the Tainan City Government on 6 December 2012, stipulated in Article 4 that newly established video arcades in Tainan must be located at least 1,000 meters from schools and hospitals.

Following the incident, the Tom's World arcade in Tainan demolished its original restroom and built a new one adjacent to the staff office. Three emergency buttons were installed inside the restroom. Additional surveillance cameras were installed throughout the premises, and employees were equipped with walkie-talkies to monitor suspicious individuals.

== Trial ==
=== Transfer to the district prosecutors office and pretrial detention ===
The random killing case attracted significant attention throughout Taiwan. After Tseng's arrest, Tsai Ying-chun, the prosecutor in charge of the case at the Tainan District Prosecutors Office, personally drove to the police precinct where Tseng was being held and conducted the interrogation before the suspect had been formally transferred. Following the questioning, Tsai petitioned the Tainan District Courtfor Tseng's pre-trial detention, citing the seriousness of the offense, which carried a minimum sentence of five years' imprisonment, and the risk of flight. The court granted the request.

=== Prosecution ===
On 9 January 2013, the Tainan District Prosecutors Office indicted Tseng Wen-chin and sought the death penalty, arguing that his methods were cold-blooded, brutal, and inhumane, posed a severe threat to public safety, and required his permanent isolation from society.

=== First trial ===
On 30 July 2013, the Tainan District Court handed down its first-instance verdict, sentencing Tseng Wen-chin to life imprisonment and deprivation of civil rights for life. The court stated that the defendant showed no respect for human life or compassion for the vulnerable. However, the judgment also noted that the death penalty itself is an extremely cruel punishment and that any civilized country retaining capital punishment should exercise it with utmost caution and solemnity. Quoting the traditional principle of "seeking life whenever possible," the court held that if there exists even the slightest reason why a defendant should not be sentenced to death, the state should refrain from imposing such a severe punishment.

The judgment further stated that Tseng had long suffered from psychoneurotic depression, social anxiety disorder, sleep disorders, and latent schizophrenia, and had grown up in a relatively isolated environment, which impaired his ability to properly evaluate information. The court concluded that he had not completely lost his humanity and still possessed the potential for rehabilitation.The victim's family and the Children's Rights Promotion Association of the Republic of China expressed deep disappointment with the ruling.

=== Appeal trial ===
On 6 October 2014, the Taiwan High Court Tainan Branch court upheld the first-instance judgment, sentencing Tseng Wen-chin to life imprisonment and ordering that he undergo five years of compulsory treatment at a designated institution before serving his sentence. The appellate ruling once again sparked public controversy, drawing criticism from the victim's family and child advocacy groups and provoking widespread debate. Prosecutors decided to appeal to the Supreme Court (Taiwan).

On 31 December 2014, the Supreme Court (Taiwan) ruled that the second-instance court should not have relied solely on psychiatric evaluations conducted after the crime to assess Tseng's mental condition. Instead, it held that his behavior before, during, and after the offense should also be considered. Accordingly, the Supreme Court overturned the appellate judgment and remanded the case to the Taiwan High Court Tainan Branch for retrial.

=== Retrial (first remand) ===
On 26 January 2016, the collegiate panel of the Taiwan High Court Tainan Branch Court, during the first retrial, noted that physicians at Jianan Psychiatric Center had suggested that Tseng might have been feigning mental illness, although no definitive diagnosis of malingering had been made. Previous evaluations by several hospitals had consistently found that he suffered from mental disorders, and therefore intentional deception could not be established.

The court found that Tseng's detailed account of the crime demonstrated that he had been conscious and aware while committing the murder. Nevertheless, considering the International Covenants on Human Rights, which prohibit the execution of individuals with mental or intellectual disabilities, the court ruled that the purpose of modern punishment was not based solely on retributive justice as expressed in the principle of “an eye for an eye.” Although parole would be possible after twenty-five years if genuine remorse and rehabilitation were demonstrated, lifelong imprisonment could still be imposed if rehabilitation proved ineffective, thereby preventing further harm to society. The court held that, despite the gravity and reprehensible nature of the crime, Tseng retained the possibility of reform, and thus a sentence of life imprisonment was consistent with the principles of proportionality and appropriate punishment.

Fang Pei-chi, the victim's aunt, criticized the ruling, stating, "Justice died long ago. I stopped having expectations long ago."

=== Final appeal ===
On 5 May 2016, the Supreme Court (Taiwan) issued its final judgment, sentencing Tseng Wen-chin to life imprisonment and deprivation of civil rights for life. The ruling became final and binding.
