= Claire Martin =

Claire or Clare Martin may refer to:

- Claire Martin (gymnast) (born 1998), French artistic gymnast
- Clare Martin (ice hockey) (1922–1980), Canadian NHL player
- Claire Martin (meteorologist), British-Canadian meteorologist, broadcaster, and environmentalist
- Claire Martin (singer) (born 1967), English jazz singer
- Claire Martin (writer) (1914–2014), Canadian author

== See also ==
- Clare Martin (born 1952), Australian politician
- Clare Martin (ice hockey) (born George Clarence Martin; 1922–1980), Canadian ice hockey defenceman
