= Clare Martin (ice hockey) =

Canadian ice hockey player

- Born: February 25, 1922 Waterloo, Ontario, Canada
- Died: September 23, 1980 (aged 58) Hamilton, Ontario, Canada
- Height: 5 ft 11 in (180 cm)
- Weight: 180 lb (82 kg; 12 st 12 lb)
- Position: Defence
- Shot: Right
- Played for: Boston Bruins; Chicago Black Hawks; Detroit Red Wings; New York Rangers
- Playing career: 1941–1955

George Clarence Martin (February 25, 1922 – September 23, 1980) was a Canadian ice hockey defenceman who played in the National Hockey League for four teams between 1942 and 1952. He won the Stanley Cup with the Red Wings in 1950. He was born in Waterloo, Ontario.

== Playing career ==
Martin's career began with the Boston Bruins in 1941–42 NHL season. After that season he enlisted in the Canadian military for World War II. He made it back to the NHL with the Bruins in 1947. He got his first taste of playoff experience that season. He played one more season with the Bruins in 1948. In 1949 he played for the Hershey Bears of the AHL.

Clare Martin was traded to the Detroit Red Wings in the summer of 1949 along with Pete Babando, Lloyd Durham, and Jimmy Peters for Pete Horeck and Bill Quackenbush. He won the Stanley Cup with the Red Wings in 1950. He played the 1951 season for the Red Wings before being traded to the Chicago Black Hawks with George Gee, Jim McFadden, Max McNab, Jimmy Peters and Clare Raglan in what amounted to an opportunity to shore up a Chicago franchise that was on the decline. He played only 31 games for the Black Hawks before he was traded to the New York Rangers at Christmas 1951. He played only 14 games for the Rangers. He finished the 1952 season with the Cincinnati Mohawks of the AHL. He played 3 seasons of Senior hockey with the Kitchener Dutchmen helping them win the 1953 Allan Cup before retiring from hockey.

== Career statistics ==
=== Regular season and playoffs ===
			Regular season					Playoffs
Season	Team	League	GP	G	A	Pts	PIM	GP	G	A	Pts	PIM
1939–40	Kitchener-Waterloo Siskins	OHA B	10	9	4	13	18	16	10	5	15	28
1940–41	Guelph Biltmores	OHA	16	4	4	8	28	5	1	4	5	6
1940–41	Boston Olympics	EAHL	9	0	1	1	4	—	—	—	—	—
1941–42	Boston Bruins	NHL	13	0	1	1	4	—	—	—	—	—
1941–42	Boston Olympics	EAHL	43	11	18	29	31	1	0	1	1	0
1942–43	Ottawa Postal Corps	ONDHL	9	3	2	5	11	—	—	—	—	—
1943–44	Montreal Royals	QSHL	3	0	2	2	4	6	1	1	2	0
1944–45	Halifax Navy	NSDHL	—	—	—	—	—	5	0	3	3	2
1945–46	Boston Olympics	EAHL	51	19	22	41	26	12	4	10	14	2
1946–47	Boston Bruins	NHL	6	3	0	3	0	5	0	1	1	0
1946–47	Hershey Bears	AHL	42	4	11	15	38	—	—	—	—	—
1947–48	Boston Bruins	NHL	59	5	13	18	34	5	0	0	0	6
1948–49	Hershey Bears	AHL	26	3	13	16	18	11	1	7	8	10
1949–50	Detroit Red Wings	NHL	64	2	5	7	14	10	0	1	1	0
1950–51	Detroit Red Wings	NHL	50	1	6	7	12	2	0	0	0	0
1951–52	Chicago Black Hawks	NHL	31	1	2	3	8	—	—	—	—	—
1951–52	New York Rangers	NHL	14	0	1	1	6	—	—	—	—	—
1952–53	Ayr Centennials	OHA Sr	46	5	19	24	60	11	4	3	7	18
1952–53	Ayr Centennials	Al-Cup	—	—	—	—	—	18	5	12	17	28
1953–54	Ayr Centennials	OHA Sr	37	9	16	25	36	8	1	0	1	5
1954–55	Ayr Centennials	OHA Sr	20	3	5	8	18	10	1	2	3	6
1954–55	Ayr Centennials	Al-Cup	—	—	—	—	—	17	5	6	11	10
NHL totals			237	12	28	40	78	27	0	2	2	6

== Numbers ==
- Wore Uniform #6 for the Chicago Black Hawks.
- Wore Uniform #17 for the New York Rangers.
