= 1950 Stanley Cup Final =

1950 ice hockey championship series

	1	2	3	4	5	6	7	Total
Detroit Red Wings	4	1	4	3*	1*	5	4**	4
New York Rangers	1	3	0	4*	2*	4	3**	3
- * – Denotes overtime period(s)
- Location(s): Detroit: Olympia Stadium (1, 4–7); Toronto: Maple Leaf Gardens (2, 3)
- Coaches: Detroit: Tommy Ivan; New York: Lynn Patrick
- Captains: Detroit: Sid Abel; New York: Frank Eddolls
- Dates: April 11–23, 1950
- Series-winning goal: Pete Babando (8:31, second OT)
- Hall of Famers: Red Wings: Sid Abel (1969); Gordie Howe (1972; did not play); Red Kelly (1969); Ted Lindsay (1966); Harry Lumley (1980); Marcel Pronovost (1978); Jack Stewart (1964); Rangers: Edgar Laprade (1993); Buddy O'Connor (1998); Chuck Rayner (1973); Fred Shero (2013, builder); Allan Stanley (1981); Coaches: Tommy Ivan (1974); Lynn Patrick (1980, player)

The 1950 Stanley Cup Final was contested by the New York Rangers and the Detroit Red Wings. It was the Rangers' first appearance in the Finals since their Stanley Cup victory in 1940. This was a rematch of the 1937 Stanley Cup Finals, which the Red Wings won in five games. The Red Wings once again defeated the Rangers, this time in seven games, to mark their franchise's fourth Cup win, and first since 1943.

This was the last Stanley Cup Finals to feature a team that did not host any games and also the last to feature neutral site games until 2020. The neutral site games were held in Toronto on account of scheduling conflicts at Madison Square Garden.

== Paths to the Finals ==
New York defeated the Montreal Canadiens 4–1 to reach the Finals. Detroit defeated the three-time defending champion Toronto Maple Leafs (who had swept the Red Wings in the Finals two years running) 4–3 to reach the Finals.

== Game summaries ==
Two games were played in Toronto as the circus had taken over Madison Square Garden in New York. New York's Don Raleigh scored two overtime winners and Pete Babando scored the Cup-winning goal in double overtime of Game 7, the first time ever in which the Stanley Cup was won in extra frames in Game 7. Detroit won the Cup without Gordie Howe, injured in the first game of the playoffs.

As Stanley Cup runner-up, the Rangers were awarded the O'Brien Cup, and they became the last team to win this trophy, which was retired after the season. Originally, the O'Brien Cup was the championship trophy of the National Hockey Association, the NHL's precursor, and later awarded to the NHL champion before the league took over control of the Stanley Cup in 1927.

=== Series ===
April 11	New York Rangers	1–4	Detroit Red Wings	Olympia Stadium	Recap
Buddy O'Connor (2) – 05:58		First period	No scoring
No scoring		Second period	04:43 – pp – Joe Carveth (2); 09:32 – George Gee (2); 10:06 – Jim McFadden (1); 13:56 – pp – Gerry Couture (2)
No scoring		Third period	No scoring
Chuck Rayner		Goalie stats	Harry Lumley

April 13	Detroit Red Wings	1–3	New York Rangers	Maple Leaf Gardens	Recap
No scoring		First period	No scoring
Gerry Couture (3) – 03:05		Second period	10:39 – Pat Egan (3)
No scoring		Third period	03:04 – Edgar Laprade (1); 11:20 – Edgar Laprade (2)
Harry Lumley		Goalie stats	Chuck Rayner

April 15	Detroit Red Wings	4–0	New York Rangers	Maple Leaf Gardens	Recap
Gerry Couture (4) – pp – 14:14; George Gee (3) – pp – 19:08		First period	No scoring
Sid Abel (2) – 19:16		Second period	No scoring
Marty Pavelich (3) – 16:55		Third period	No scoring
Harry Lumley		Goalie stats	Chuck Rayner

April 18	New York Rangers	4–3	OT	Detroit Red Wings	Olympia Stadium	Recap
No scoring		First period		06:31 – Ted Lindsay (1); 16:48 – Sid Abel (3)
Buddy O'Connor (3) – 19:59		Second period		No scoring
Edgar Laprade (3) – 08:09; Gus Kyle (1) – 16:26		Third period		03:32 – Marty Pavelich (4)
Don Raleigh (3) – 08:34		First overtime period		No scoring
Chuck Rayner		Goalie stats		Harry Lumley

April 20	New York Rangers	2–1	OT	Detroit Red Wings	Olympia Stadium	Recap
No scoring		First period		No scoring
Dunc Fisher (2) – 07:44		Second period		No scoring
No scoring		Third period		18:10 – Ted Lindsay (2)
Don Raleigh (4) – 01:38		First overtime period		No scoring
Chuck Rayner		Goalie stats		Harry Lumley

April 22	New York Rangers	4–5	Detroit Red Wings	Olympia Stadium	Recap
Allan Stanley (1) – 03:45; Dunc Fisher (3) – 07:35		First period	19:18 – Ted Lindsay (3)
Pentti Lund (6) – pp – 03:18		Second period	05:38 – Sid Abel (4); 16:07 – Gerry Couture (5)
Tony Leswick (1) – 01:54		Third period	04:13 – Ted Lindsay (4); 10:34 – Sid Abel (5)
Chuck Rayner		Goalie stats	Harry Lumley

April 23	New York Rangers	3–4	2OT	Detroit Red Wings	Olympia Stadium	Recap
Allan Stanley (2) – pp – 11:14; Tony Leswick (2) – pp – 12:18		First period		No scoring
Buddy O'Connor (4) – 11:42		Second period		05:09 – pp – Pete Babando (1); 05:30 – pp – Sid Abel (6); 15:57 – Jim McFadden (2)
No scoring		Third period		No scoring
No scoring		Second overtime period		08:31 – Pete Babando (2)
Chuck Rayner		Goalie stats		Harry Lumley

Detroit won series 4–3

== Stanley Cup engraving ==
The 1950 Stanley Cup was presented to Red Wings captain Sid Abel by NHL President Clarence Campbell following the Red Wings 4–3 double overtime win over the Rangers in game seven.

The following Red Wings players and staff had their names engraved on the Stanley Cup

1949–50 Detroit Red Wings

=== Players ===
Centres

- 8 George Gee
- 11 Max McNab
- 12 Sid Abel (Captain)
- 16 Jim McFadden
- 20 Larry Wilson

Wingers

- 7 Ted Lindsay (A)
- 9 Gordie Howe
- 10 Jimmy Peters, Sr.
- 14 Pete Babando
- 15 Marty Pavelich
- 17 Joe Carveth
- 18 Gerry "Doc" Couture
- 19 Steve Black
- 22 Gordon Haidy^
- 23 John Wilson
- 27 Doug McKay^

Defencemen

- 2 Jack Stewart (A)
- 3 Clare Martin
- 4 Leonard Red Kelly
- 5 Leo Reise, Jr. (A)
- 21 Lido Lee Fogolin, Sr.
- 22 Marcel Pronovost
- 22-3 Al Dewsbury

Goaltenders

- 1 Harry Lumley
- Harry MacQueston* (Spare-did not play)

* Name was later removed when the Stanley Cup was redone in the 1957–58 season.

=== Coaching and administrative staff ===
- James E. Norris Sr. (President/Owner), James D. Norris Jr. (Vice President/Owner)
- Arthur Wirtz Sr. (Secretary-Treasurer/Owner). Jack Adams (Manager)
- Tommy Ivan (Coach), Fred Hubert Jr (Publicity Director)
- Carson Cooper (Chief Scout), Carl Mattson (Trainer)
- Walter Humeniuk (Asst. Trainer)
- Wally Crossman (Stick Boy/Asst. Trainer) (on 1 of 3 team pictures) - Left off the Stanley Cup.

=== Stanley Cup engraving ===
- * #1 Terry Sawchuk (G) – played in seven NHL games in 1950, because Harry Lumley was injured. Sawchuk was not available for the playoffs because he was helping the AHL Indianapolis Capitals win the Calder Cup. Instead, Harry MacQueston was called up as the spare goalie for the playoffs. MacQueston's name was engraved on the Stanley Cup, but he never played in the NHL. MacQueston was removed from the Stanley Cup when it was re-done during the 1957–58 season.
- Al Dewsbury, Gord Haidy, and Doug Mackay also won the Calder Cup with the Indianapolis Capitals and the Stanley Cup with Detroit in 1950. Fred Glover, Enio Sclisizzi, and Benny Woit also won the Calder Cup in 1950 and then won the Stanley Cup in 1952.
- Detroit did not engrave the names of #20 Gordon Haidy (RW) and #27 Doug McKay (LW) on the Stanley Cup, even though they each played one playoff game and qualified to be on the cup. McKay played his only NHL game in the Finals, while Haidy played his only NHL game in the semifinals.

== See also ==
- 1949–50 NHL season

== Notes ==
Preceded by Toronto Maple Leafs; 1949	Detroit Red Wings; Stanley Cup champions 1950	Succeeded by Toronto Maple Leafs; 1951
