= Tainan City Hakka Assembly Hall of Culture =

Cultural center in South, Tainan, Taiwan

- 臺南市客家文化會館
- Interactive map of the Tainan City Hakka Assembly Hall of Culture area

General information
- Type: cultural center
- Location: South, Tainan, Taiwan
- Coordinates: 22°59′06.8″N 120°11′39.7″E
- Completed: 2010
- Opened: 2010

The Tainan City Hakka Assembly Hall of Culture (traditional Chinese: 臺南市客家文化會館; simplified Chinese: 台南市客家文化会馆; pinyin: Táinán Shì Kèjiā Wénhuà Huìguǎn) is a cultural center in South District, Tainan, Taiwan.

== History ==
The construction of the cultural center was completed and opened in 2010.

== Architecture ==
The building was designed with Hakka architectural style. Its main entrance is designed with wooden sign and lanterns with pattern.

== Exhibitions ==
The center exhibits various Hakka-related artifacts, such as crafts, foods and architecture. It also includes the history of Hakka people and culture.

== Transportation ==
The center is accessible within walking distance southwest of Tainan Station of Taiwan Railway.

== See also ==
- List of tourist attractions in Taiwan
