= Don Raleigh =

Canadian ice hockey player (1926–2012)

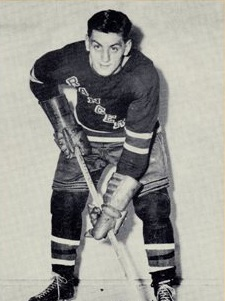
- Born: June 27, 1926 Kenora, Ontario, Canada
- Died: August 21, 2012 (aged 86) Kingston, Ontario, Canada
- Height: 5 ft 11 in (180 cm)
- Weight: 150 lb (68 kg; 10 st 10 lb)
- Position: Centre
- Shot: Left
- Played for: New York Rangers
- Playing career: 1943–1958

James Donald Raleigh (June 27, 1926 – August 21, 2012) was a Canadian professional ice hockey player who played centre with the New York Rangers of the National Hockey League between 1943 and 1956.

== Playing career ==
Raleigh played most of his career in the National Hockey League for the New York Rangers, playing a total of 535 regular season games. He made his debut for the Rangers during the 1943-44 NHL season as a seventeen-year-old. Throughout his career he was known by the nickname 'Bones' because of his 150-pound frame. On February 25, 1948, against the Chicago Black Hawks he became the first player in Rangers history to score four goals in a single game. In the 1950 Stanley Cup Finals, Raleigh scored the overtime winner in games four and five against the Detroit Red Wings, making him the first player to score back-to-back overtime goals in the Stanley Cup Finals. The Red Wings would take game six and go on to win game seven in double overtime to win the Stanley Cup 4-3, in which Raleigh hit the crossbar in what would have been his third overtime goal in the finals and the cup-winning goal for the Rangers who wouldn't win another Stanley Cup until 1994. He retired from hockey in 1958.

== Later life and death ==
Raleigh lived most of his life in Winnipeg, Manitoba, and was inducted into the Manitoba Sports Hall of Fame and the Manitoba Hockey Hall of Fame. He suffered from failing health from 2010 and after suffering a fall he died on August 21, 2012, when his family made the decision to turn off his life support.

== Awards and achievements ==
- MJHL Scoring Champion (1946)
- Played in NHL All-Star Game (1951 and 1954)
- Inducted into the Manitoba Sports Hall of Fame and Museum in 1998
- Honoured Member of the Manitoba Hockey Hall of Fame
- In the 2009 book 100 Ranger Greats, was ranked No. 32 all-time of the 901 New York Rangers who had played during the team's first 82 seasons

== Career statistics ==
=== Regular season and playoffs ===
			Regular season					Playoffs
Season	Team	League	GP	G	A	Pts	PIM	GP	G	A	Pts	PIM
1941–42	East Kildonan Collegiate	HS-MB	—	—	—	—	—	—	—	—	—	—
1941–42	Winnipeg Exelciors	MAHA	—	—	—	—	—	—	—	—	—	—
1942–43	Winnipeg Monarchs	MJHL	12	8	1	9	0	2	1	1	2	0
1943–44	New York Rangers	NHL	15	2	2	4	2	—	—	—	—	—
1943–44	Brooklyn Crescents	EAHL	26	23	20	43	6	11	16	9	25	4
1944–45	Winnipeg Monarchs	MJHL	5	14	9	23	2	7	5	7	12	19
1944–45	Winnipeg Army	WNDHL	4	3	1	4	0	2	1	2	3	0
1945–46	Brandon Elks	MJHL	10	24	24	48	2	7	7	11	18	18
1946–47	University of Manitoba	WSrHL	3	8	6	14	2	—	—	—	—	—
1946–47	Winnipeg Flyers	WSrHL	3	4	1	5	0	4	3	15	18	0
1946–47	Winnipeg Flyers	Al-Cup	—	—	—	—	—	8	8	7	15	0
1947–48	New York Rangers	NHL	52	15	18	33	2	6	2	0	2	2
1948–49	New York Rangers	NHL	41	10	16	26	8	—	—	—	—	—
1949–50	New York Rangers	NHL	70	12	25	37	11	12	4	5	9	4
1950–51	New York Rangers	NHL	64	15	24	39	18	—	—	—	—	—
1950–51	New York Rovers	EAHL	2	0	0	0	0	—	—	—	—	—
1951–52	New York Rangers	NHL	70	19	42	61	14	—	—	—	—	—
1952–53	New York Rangers	NHL	55	4	18	22	2	—	—	—	—	—
1953–54	New York Rangers	NHL	70	15	30	45	16	—	—	—	—	—
1954–55	New York Rangers	NHL	69	8	32	40	19	—	—	—	—	—
1955–56	New York Rangers	NHL	29	1	12	13	4	—	—	—	—	—
1955–56	Providence Reds	AHL	13	4	20	24	0	—	—	—	—	—
1955–56	Saskatoon Quakers	WHL	25	17	19	36	2	3	1	1	2	2
1956–57	Brandon Regals	WHL	68	13	47	60	14	9	0	3	3	0
1957–58	Saskatoon Quakers	WHL	40	10	23	33	8	—	—	—	—	—
NHL totals			535	101	219	320	96	18	6	5	11	6

=== Coaching record ===
			Regular season
Season	Team	League	GC	W	L	T
1956–57	Brandon Regals	WHL	70	44	22	4
1957–58	Saskatoon Regals/St. Paul Saints	WHL	70	25	45	0
WHL totals			140	69	67	4

Sporting positions
Preceded by Allan Stanley	New York Rangers captain 1953–55	Succeeded by Harry Howell
