= Blueprint Culture and Creative Park =

Event venue in South, Tainan, Taiwan

- 藍晒圖文創園區
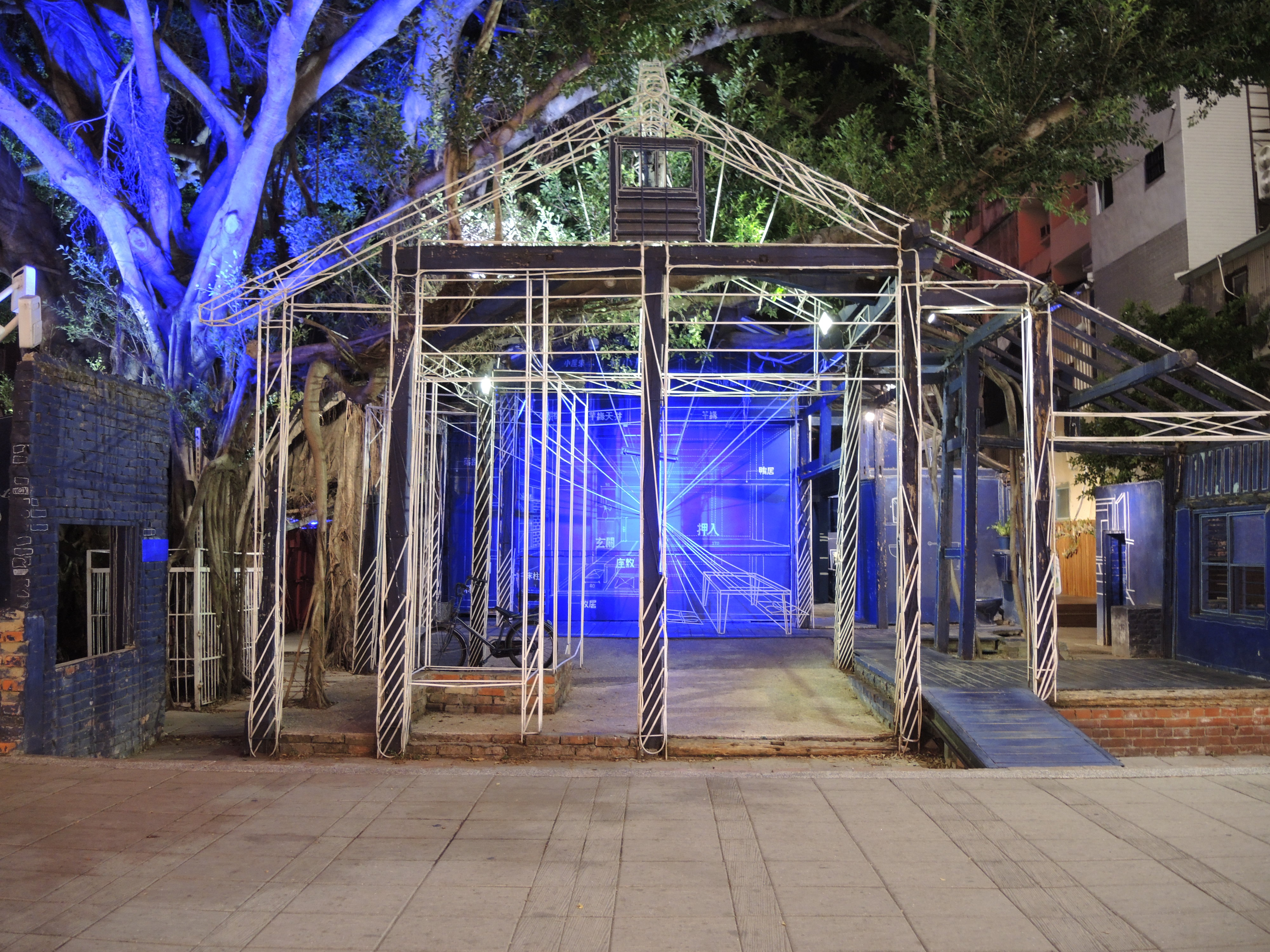
- Interactive map of the Blueprint Culture and Creative Park area

General information
- Location: South, Tainan, Taiwan
- Coordinates: 22°59′13.6″N 120°11′50.4″E
- Opened: December 2015

Website
- Official website

The Blueprint Culture and Creative Park (BCP; traditional Chinese: 藍晒圖文創園區; simplified Chinese: 蓝晒图文创园区; pinyin: Lánshàitú Wénchuàng Yuánqū) is a multi-purpose park in South District, Tainan, Taiwan.

== History ==
The park was opened in December 2015.

== Architecture ==
The park was built from old abandoned judicial houses (simplified Chinese: 旧司法宿舍; traditional Chinese: 舊司法宿舍; pinyin: Jiù Sīfǎ Sùshè) which have been restored with blueprint architectural style. The park includes restaurants.

== See also ==
- List of tourist attractions in Taiwan
