= South District, Tainan =

District in Tainan, Taiwan

Coordinates: 22.961555°N 120.191261°E

South 南區
- District
- South District
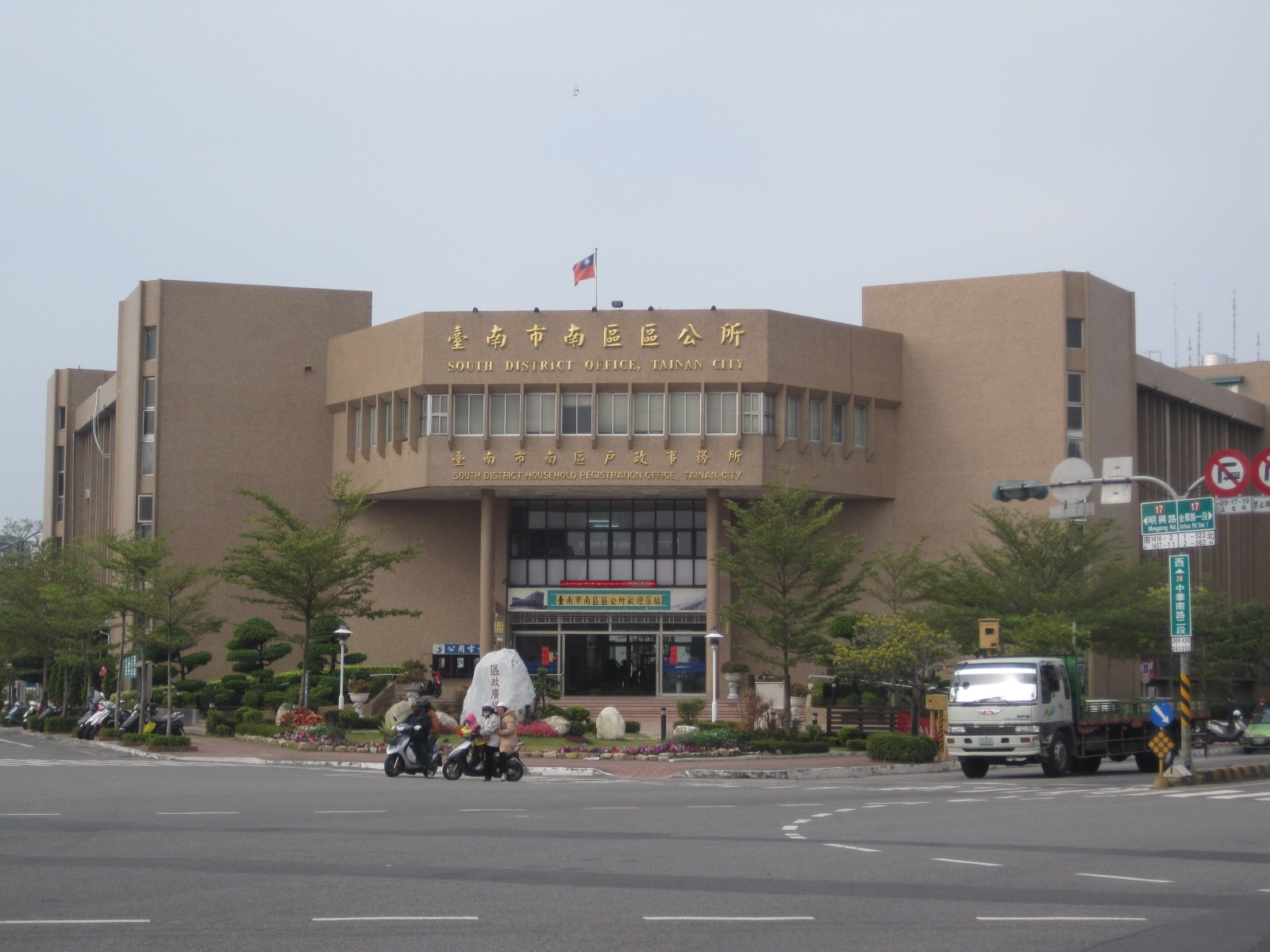

- Country: Republic of China (Taiwan)
- Region: Southern Tainan
- Divisions: List: 39 villages; 833 neighborhoods

Area
  - Total: 27.2681 km^{2} (10.5283 sq mi)
  - Rank: Ranked 33rd of 37

Population (May 2022)
  - Total: 121,133
  - Rank: Ranked 5th of 37
  - Density: 4,442.30/km^{2} (11,505.5/sq mi)
- Postal code: 702
- Website: www.tnsouth.gov.tw (in Chinese)

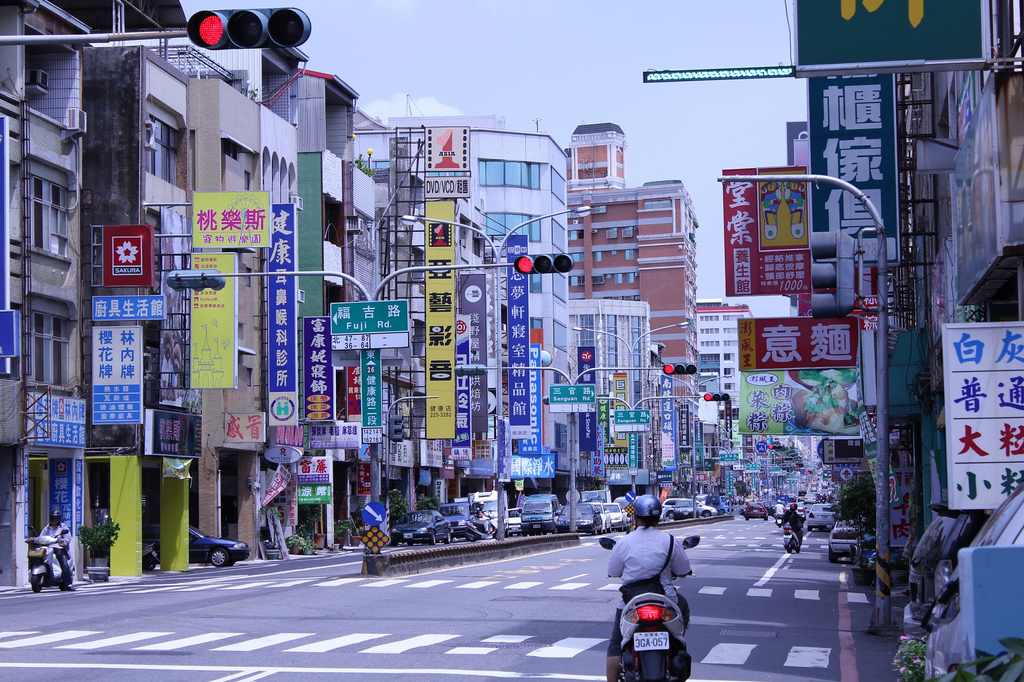
Jiankang Street in south district

South District (Chinese: 南區; pinyin: Nán Qū; Pe̍h-ōe-jī: Lâm-khu) is a district home to 121,133 people located in Tainan, Taiwan.

== History ==
In February 2002, Qingquan Village and Longgang Village were combined to be Kunni Village; Songshan Village and Nanshan Village were merged into Songan Village; Zhonghe Village, Juexin Village and Haifeng Village were merged into Yongning Village; Nandu Village was divided into Nandu Village and Nanhua Village. In February 2006, Xingzhong Village was merged into Mingde Village, bringing the total villages in the district to become 39.

== Geography ==
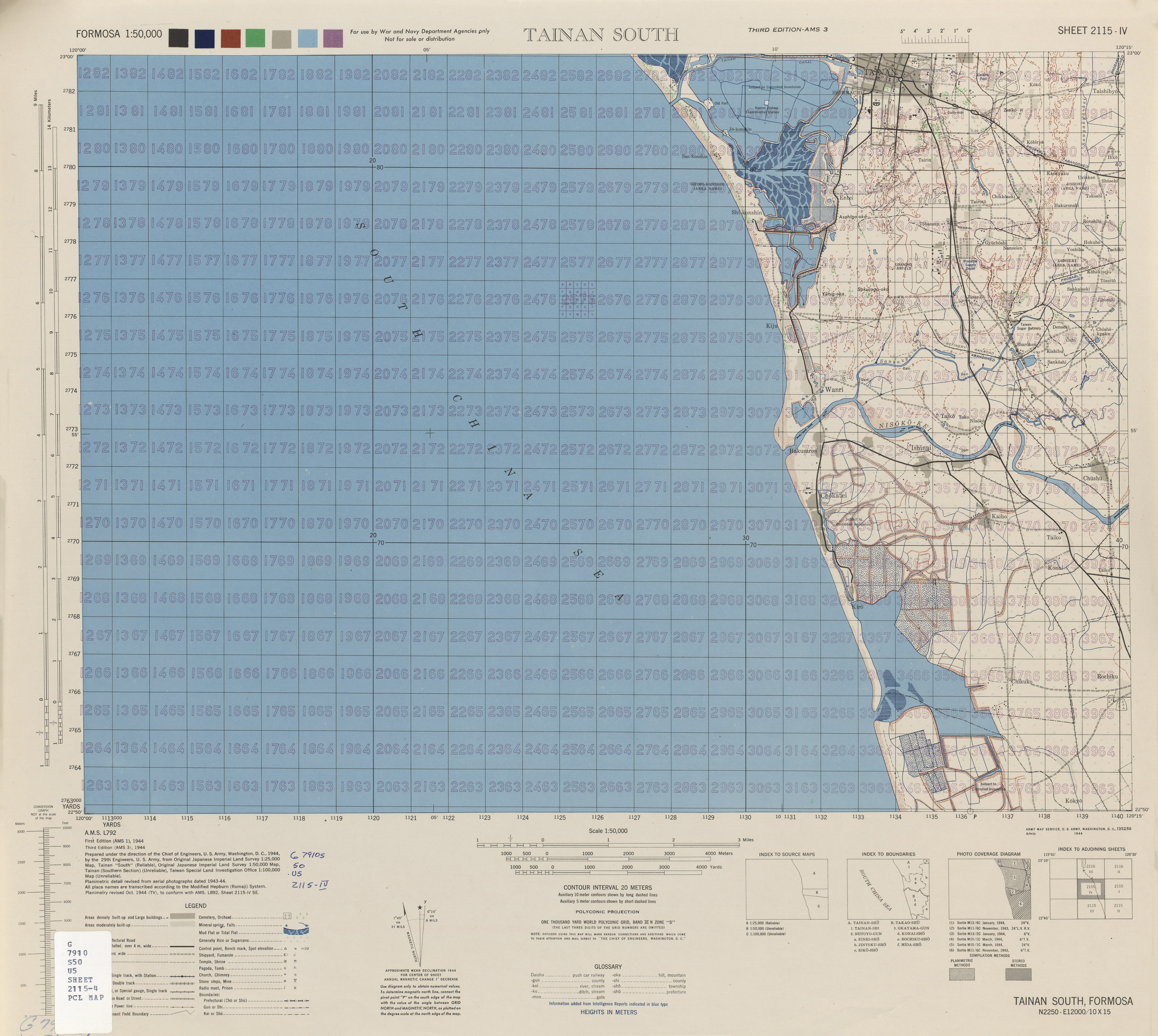
Map of Tainan South area (1944)

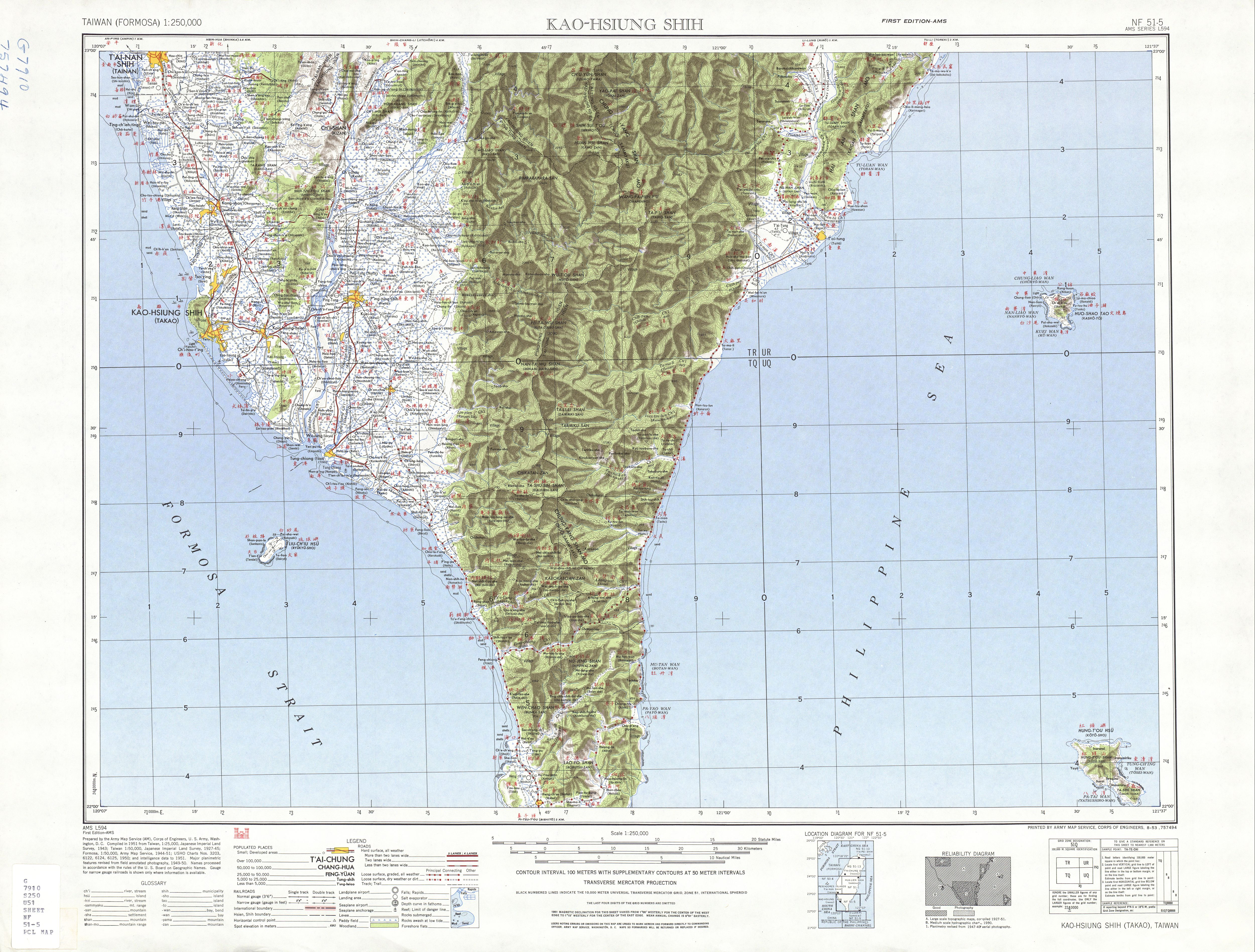
Map of the region including southern Tainan (1951)

- Population: 125,734 (January 2016)
- Area: 28.0383 km^{2}

== Administrative divisions ==
The map of division of South District.

Xia-lin subarea:Wennan, Wenhua, Xinchang, Guangzhou
Tian-liao subarea:Xinxing, Zaixing, Tianliao, Dacheng
Xin-xing public housing subarea:Kainan, Nandou, Nanhua, Zhangnan
Shue-jiao-she subarea:Mingde, Lizhai
Da-lin subarea:Dazhong, Dalin, Daen, Xinsheng
Yan-cheng subarea:Jinhua, Guozhai, Rixin, Baixue, Funan, Mingliang, Mingxing, Jiannan, Junnan, Guangming
Misc subarea:Zhuxi
Sih-kun-seng subarea:Kunseng
Xi-shu subarea:Xibei, Xidong, Xinan
Wan-li subarea:Yongning, Tongan, Fotan, Songan, Shenggong, Xingnong

== Tourist attractions ==
- Blueprint Culture and Creative Park
- Tainan City Hakka Assembly Hall of Culture
- Tainan Municipal Baseball Stadium

== Education ==
- Senior High School
  - National Tainan Commercial Vocational Senior High School
  - Tainan Municipal Nan-Ning Senior High School
  - Liu-Sin Senior High School
  - Asia Senior Hospitality Vocational School
- Junior High School
  - Tainan Municipal Da-Cheng Junior High School
  - The junior high school branch of Tainan Municipal Nan-Ning Senior High School
  - Tainan Municipal Xin-Xing Senior High School
- Elementary School
  - Tainan Municipal Xin-Xing Elementary School
  - Tainan Municipal Sheng-Gong Elementary School
  - Tainan Municipal Yong-Hua Elementary School
  - Tainan Municipal Xi-Shu Elementary School
  - Tainan Municipal Long-Gang Elementary School
  - Tainan Municipal Zi-Kai Elementary School
  - Tainan Municipal Ri-Xin Elementary School

== Transportation ==
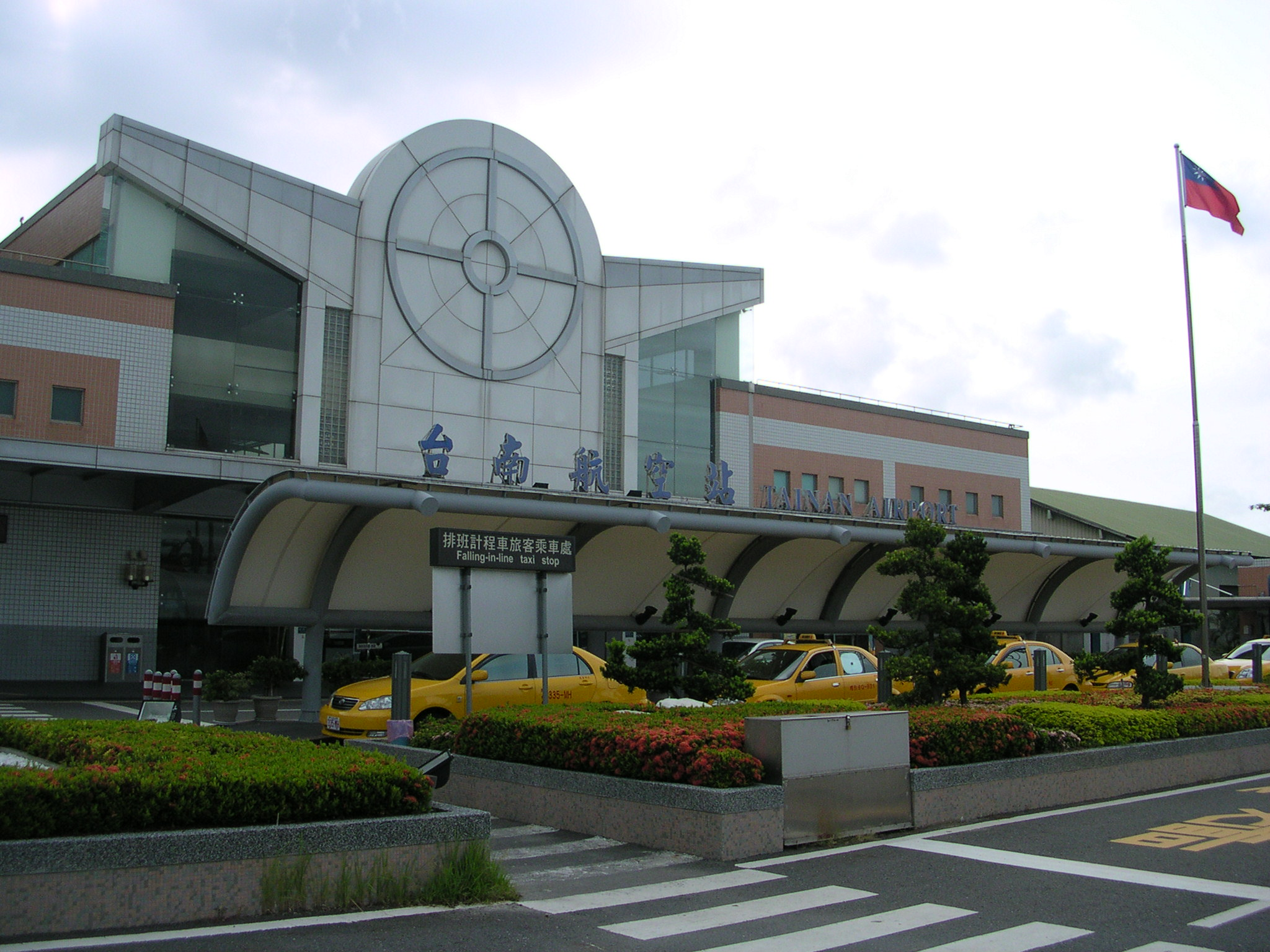
Tainan Airport

=== Air ===
The district houses the Tainan Airport.

=== Roads ===
The district is connected to Guanmiao District through Provincial Highway 86.

== See also ==
- Tainan
