= Tainan Municipal Baseball Stadium =

Sports venue in South District, Tainan, Taiwan

- 台南市立棒球場
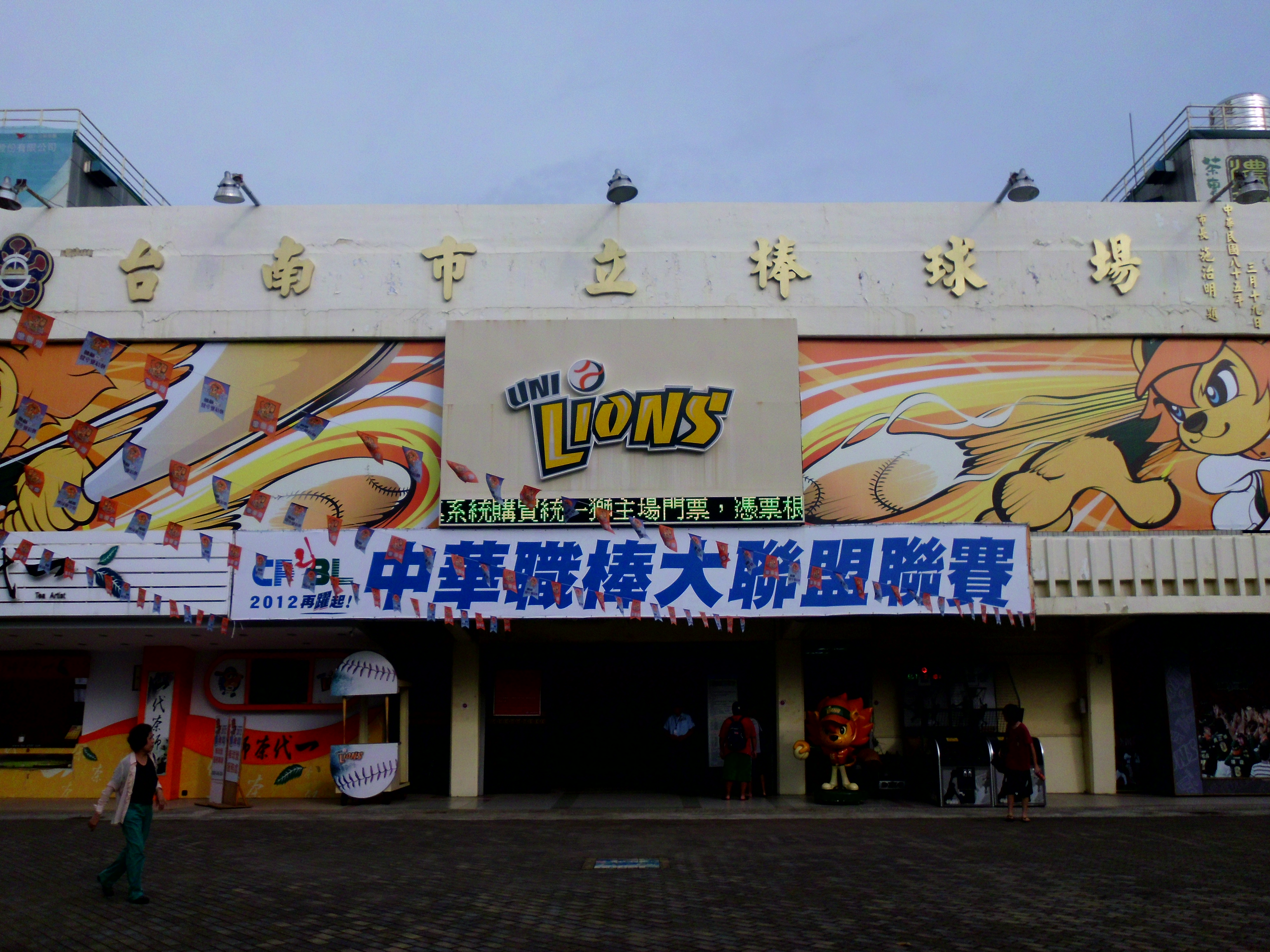
- Interactive map of Tainan Municipal Baseball Stadium
- Location: South District, Tainan, Taiwan
- Coordinates: 22°58′50.11″N 120°12′20.75″E
- Owner: Tainan City Government
- Operator: Uni-President 7-Eleven Lions
- Capacity: 12,000
- Type: Baseball stadium
- Surface: Grass
- Field size: Left Field Line - 339 ft (103.3 m); Center Field - 400 ft (121,92m); Right Field Line - 339 ft (103.3 m)

Construction
- Groundbreaking: 1930
- Opened: 1931
- Expanded: 1995

Tenant
- Uni-President 7-Eleven Lions (CPBL) (1999-2025)

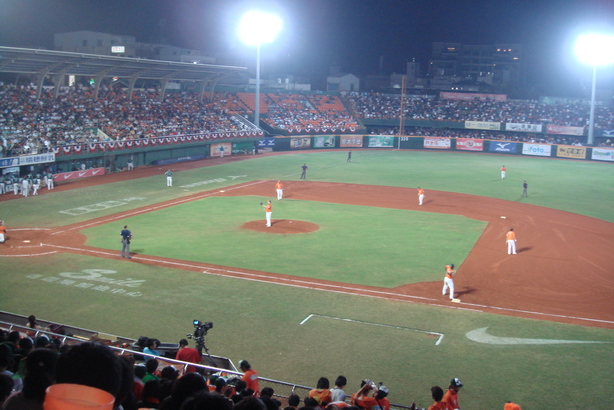
Tainan Municipal Baseball Stadium field

The Tainan Municipal Baseball Stadium (Chinese: 台南市立棒球場; pinyin: Táinán Shìlì Bàngqiúchǎng) is a baseball stadium in South District, Tainan, Taiwan. Situated in the South District, it is currently used mostly for professional baseball games, and was the home stadium of Uni-President Lions between 1999-2026 when the Lions moved to the new ASPAC Stadium.

== History ==
The stadium was built in 1931 at the site of a baseball field built during the Japanese period. The stadium underwent a series of refurbishment in the 1970s, and the light poles were installed in 1992 to enable the stadium for nighttime uses. Because the stadium is directly under the flight path of commercial airliners in and out of Tainan Airport, the building code limits the renovation that can be done to the stadium, resulting in sub-optimal placements of the light poles and support structures.

The stadium is currently under the management of the Uni-President 7-Eleven Lions organization since 1999, although the ownership is retained by the Tainan City Government. Chiayi-Tainan Luka of Taiwan Major League also occasionally played its home games here during its year of existence, although never officially naming it its home stadium.

== See also ==
- Uni-President Lions
- Chinese Professional Baseball League
- List of stadiums in Taiwan
- Sport in Taiwan
