= Pentti Lund =

Finnish Canadian ice hockey player (1925–2013)

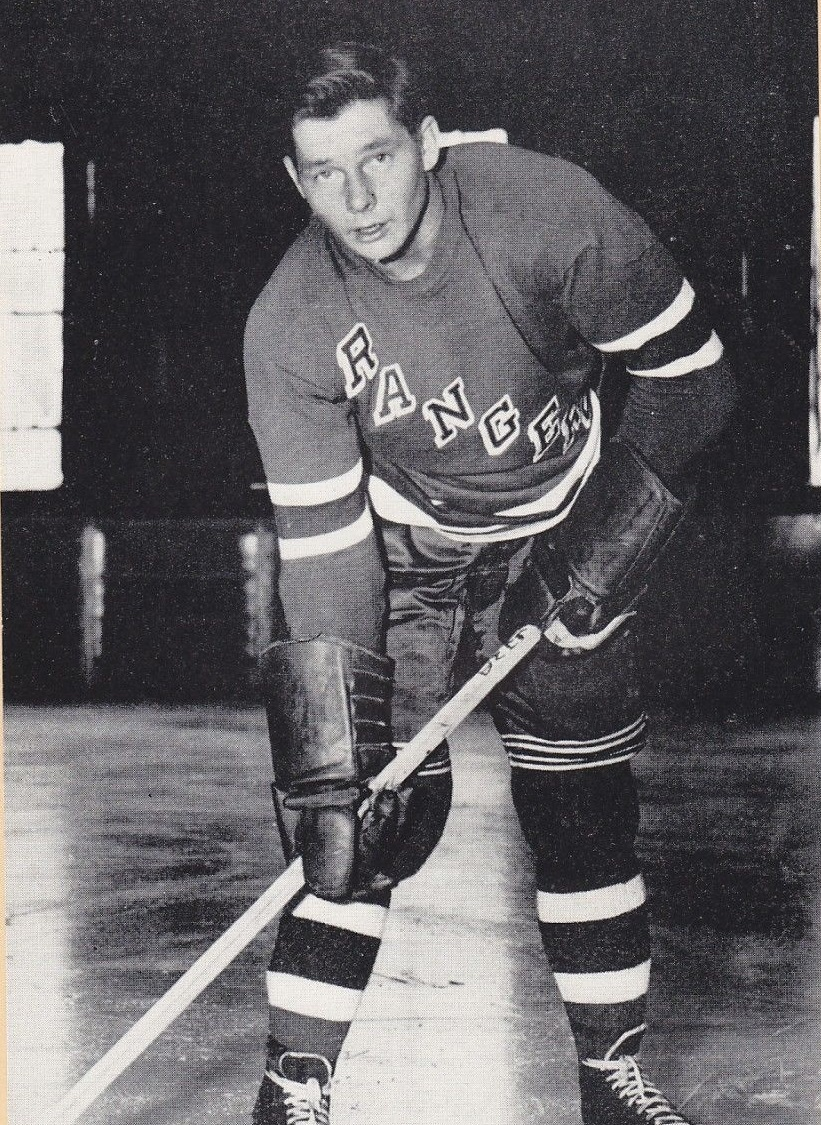
- Lund with the New York Rangers during the 1949–50 season
- Born: December 6, 1925 Karijoki, Finland
- Died: April 16, 2013 (aged 87) Thunder Bay, Ontario, Canada
- Height: 6 ft 0 in (183 cm)
- Weight: 185 lb (84 kg; 13 st 3 lb)
- Position: Right wing
- Shot: Right
- Played for: Boston Bruins; New York Rangers
- Playing career: 1943–1953

Pentti Alexander Lund (December 6, 1925 – April 16, 2013) was a Finnish Canadian professional ice hockey right winger who played for the Boston Bruins and New York Rangers of the National Hockey League. Lund was often credited as being the first Finnish player in the NHL. Albert Pudas, however, played four games with the Toronto Maple Leafs in 1926–27. Although Pudas was born in Finland, he had Canadian citizenship.

== Junior career ==
Lund moved to Port Arthur, Ontario from Finland at the age of six. He began his junior career with the local Port Arthur teams in the Thunder Bay Junior A Hockey League from 1942 to 1945. Lund led the league in scoring during his two seasons with the Navy team, where, in 19 regular season games, he scored an impressive 47 goals.

== Professional career ==
Lund turned pro in 1945–46 with the Boston Olympics of the Eastern Hockey League, a minor affiliate team of the Boston Bruins. He scored 33 points during the regular season and scored 15 points in 9 playoff games with the Olympics helping the team win a championship. Next season, Lund led the league in scoring with 92 points in 56 games. This helped him garner some fame as he was called up by the Boston Bruins in the National Hockey League to play in one playoff game. In 1947-48, Lund joined the Hershey Bears in the American Hockey League where his excellent play was rewarded with two playoff game appearances with the Boston Bruins.

During the off-season, Lund was traded to the New York Rangers, where he won the Calder Memorial Trophy as rookie of the year by scoring 14 goals and adding 16 assists in 59 games. He also became the first Finnish-born player to score a goal in the NHL. In his second year with the Rangers, he scored a career-high 18 goals. Lund and the Rangers made a great run to the Stanley Cup Finals as the fourth-seeded team. Lund had a great postseason as he recorded 11 points in 12 games. The Rangers would lose the Stanley Cup to the first-place Detroit Red Wings in seven games.

Lund was traded back to the Boston Bruins early in the 1951-52 season. During the season, Lund suffered an eye injury from a high stick on November 13, during the 13th game of the season, with Lund skating with number 13 on his jersey, suggesting to many that unlucky number 13 played a role in the injury. The injury was so severe, that he almost lost all sight in his right eye. Lund attempted a comeback after being sidelined for three months, contributing 17 points with only one eye in 1952-53. Lund would skate for two seasons with the Sault Ste. Marie Greyhounds before retiring from ice hockey in 1955.

On September 29, 1984, Lund was inducted into the Northwestern Ontario Sports Hall of Fame, and in 1992 he was inducted into the Finnish Ice Hockey Hall of Fame.

He died on April 16, 2013, at the age of 87.

== Awards and achievements ==
- Led the TBJHL in scoring in 1944, and 1945.
- EAHL champion in 1946.
- Selected to the EAHL First All-Star Team in 1947.
- EAHL Top Scorer in 1947.
- Calder Memorial Trophy winner in 1949.
- Inducted into the Northwestern Ontario Sports Hall of Fame in 1984.
- Inducted into the Finnish Ice Hockey Hall of Fame in 1992.
- First Finnish-born player to score a goal in the NHL.

== Career statistics ==
			Regular season					Playoffs
Season	Team	League	GP	G	A	Pts	PIM	GP	G	A	Pts	PIM
1942–43	Port Arthur Bruins	TBJHL	9	5	11	16	4	3	3	3	6	5
1942–43	Port Arthur Forts	M-Cup	—	—	—	—	—	1	0	0	0	0
1943–44	Port Arthur Navy	TBJHL	10	21	24	45	10	2	3	2	5	0
1943–44	Port Arthur Flyers	M-Cup	—	—	—	—	—	7	1	3	4	0
1944–45	Port Arthur Navy	TBJHL	9	26	9	35	9	—	—	—	—	—
1944–45	Port Arthur Bruins	M-Cup	—	—	—	—	—	5	5	2	7	0
1945–46	Boston Olympics	EAHL	34	14	19	33	10	12	13	6	19	7
1946–47	Boston Olympics	EAHL	56	49	43	92	21	9	7	8	15	4
1946–47	Boston Bruins	NHL	—	—	—	—	—	1	0	0	0	0
1947–48	Hershey Bears	AHL	68	26	36	62	21	2	0	0	0	0
1947–48	Boston Bruins	NHL	—	—	—	—	—	2	0	0	0	0
1948–49	New York Rangers	NHL	59	14	16	30	16	—	—	—	—	—
1949–50	New York Rangers	NHL	64	18	9	27	16	12	6	5	11	0
1950–51	New York Rangers	NHL	59	4	16	20	6	—	—	—	—	—
1951–52	Boston Bruins	NHL	23	0	5	5	0	2	1	0	1	0
1951–52	Hershey Bears	AHL	7	1	1	2	5	—	—	—	—	—
1952–53	Boston Bruins	NHL	54	8	9	17	2	2	0	0	0	0
1953–54	Sault Ste. Marie Greyhounds	NOHA	6	1	2	3	0	9	1	1	2	0
1954–55	Sault Ste. Marie Greyhounds	NOHA	48	13	18	31	9	14	2	5	7	4
NHL totals			259	44	55	99	40	19	7	5	12	0

Preceded by Jim McFadden	Winner of the Calder Memorial Trophy; 1949	Succeeded by Jack Gelineau
