= Natalia Humeniuk (soldier) =

Ukrainian servicewoman

- Наталя Гуменюк

Personal details
- Born: Natalia Kostiantynivna Humeniuk

Military service
- Allegiance: Ukraine
- Branch/service: State Border Guard Service of Ukraine
- Rank: Colonel
- Battles/wars: Russo-Ukrainian War
- Awards: Order of Princess Olga

Natalia Kostiantynivna Humeniuk (Ukrainian: Наталя Костянтинівна Гуменюк) is a Ukrainian servicewoman, captain 1st rank of the State Border Guard Service of Ukraine, a participant in the Russian-Ukrainian war.

== Biography ==
She works as an assistant to the head of the Regional Department for Media Relations of the Regional Department of the Sea Guard of the State Border Guard Service of Ukraine (Odesa).

From spring of 2022 until 19 April 2024 she was a head of the Joint Coordination Press Center of the Southern Defense Forces of Ukraine, and was replaced by Dmytro Pletenchuk, spokesperson for the Ukrainian Navy, who will hold both positions concurrently.

== Awards ==
- Order of Princess Olga, III class (12 September 2022)
