= Pete Babando =

Canadian ice hockey player (1925–2020)

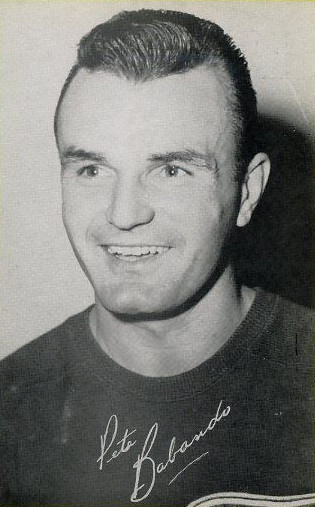
- Born: May 10, 1925 Braeburn, Pennsylvania, U.S.
- Died: February 19, 2020 (aged 94) Timmins, Ontario, Canada
- Height: 5 ft 9 in (175 cm)
- Weight: 187 lb (85 kg; 13 st 5 lb)
- Position: Left wing
- Shot: Left
- Played for: Boston Bruins; Detroit Red Wings; Chicago Black Hawks; New York Rangers
- Playing career: 1945–1967

Peter Joseph Babando (May 10, 1925 – February 19, 2020) was an American-born Canadian ice hockey player who played in the National Hockey League with all four of the United States–based Original Six teams (Boston Bruins, Detroit Red Wings, Chicago Black Hawks and New York Rangers).

The son of Italian immigrants, Babando was born in Braeburn-Lower Burrell, Pennsylvania. His family briefly moved back to Italy before settling in South Porcupine, Ontario, when he was a youngster.

Babando died on February 19, 2020, at the age of 94.

== Career ==
During six NHL seasons, Babando scored 86 goals, and 73 assists (for 159 points) in 351 regular season games. On April 23, 1950, in game seven of the Stanley Cup Final, he scored the Cup-clinching goal as a member of the Red Wings, to defeat the New York Rangers at 8:31 of the second overtime. As of 2022, it remains the only game seven of the Stanley Cup Final to go multiple overtimes. At the time, he was one of the few American-born players in the NHL. The goal was the third and final Stanley Cup playoff goal in Babando's career. About three months later, Babando was traded to the Chicago Black Hawks as part of a nine-player deal. Babando was also a member of the Clinton Comets of the Eastern Hockey League.

== Career statistics ==
			Regular season					Playoffs
Season	Team	League	GP	G	A	Pts	PIM	GP	G	A	Pts	PIM
1943–44	Galt Red Wings	OHA-Jr.	6	2	0	2	10	4	1	2	3	2
1944–45	Galt Red Wings	OHA-Jr.	19	13	10	23	30	—	—	—	—	—
1945–46	Boston Olympics	EAHL	32	25	10	35	50	12	8	8	16	10
1946–47	Hershey Bears	AHL	51	19	26	45	81	11	2	0	2	0
1947–48	Boston Bruins	NHL	60	23	11	34	52	5	1	1	2	2
1948–49	Boston Bruins	NHL	58	19	14	33	34	4	0	0	0	2
1949–50	Detroit Red Wings	NHL	56	6	6	12	25	8	2	2	4	2
1950–51	Chicago Black Hawks	NHL	70	18	19	37	36	—	—	—	—	—
1951–52	Chicago Black Hawks	NHL	49	11	14	25	29	—	—	—	—	—
1952–53	Chicago Black Hawks	NHL	29	5	5	10	14	—	—	—	—	—
1952–53	New York Rangers	NHL	29	4	4	8	4	—	—	—	—	—
1953–54	Buffalo Bisons	AHL	63	21	43	64	46	3	2	0	2	2
1954–55	Buffalo Bisons	AHL	59	20	30	50	61	10	5	6	11	6
1955–56	Buffalo Bisons	AHL	59	26	19	45	65	5	1	1	2	2
1956–57	Buffalo Bisons	AHL	33	7	9	16	30	—	—	—	—	—
1957–58	North Bay Trappers	NOHA	16	9	8	17	44	—	—	—	—	—
1958–59	Whitby Dunlops	OHA-Sr.	50	22	27	49	28	9	3	5	8	8
1958–59	Whitby Dunlops	Al-Cup	—	—	—	—	—	12	3	5	8	8
1959–60	Whitby Dunlops	OHA-Sr.	53	28	34	62	48	10	8	3	11	12
1960–61	Clinton Comets	EHL	1	0	0	0	2	—	—	—	—	—
1961–62	Clinton Comets	EHL	67	43	68	111	37	6	2	3	5	4
1962–63	Clinton Comets	EHL	66	55	83	138	26	13	9	22	31	16
1963–64	Clinton Comets	EHL	68	26	65	91	34	15	12	11	23	34
1964–65	Clinton Comets	EHL	61	37	65	102	26	11	8	6	14	2
1965–66	Clinton Comets	EHL	1	1	0	1	0	—	—	—	—	—
1966–67	Clinton Comets	EHL	71	39	49	88	101	9	2	4	6	4
NHL totals			351	86	73	159	194	17	3	3	6	6
EAHL/EHL totals			367	226	340	566	276	66	41	54	95	70
AHL totals			265	93	127	220	283	29	10	7	17	10
