= Gerry Couture =

Canadian ice hockey player

- Couture with the University of Saskatchewan, c. 1943–45
- Born: August 6, 1925 Saskatoon, Saskatchewan, Canada
- Died: July 13, 1994 (aged 68)
- Height: 6 ft 2 in (188 cm)
- Weight: 185 lb (84 kg; 13 st 3 lb)
- Position: Centre
- Shot: Right
- Played for: Detroit Red Wings; Montreal Canadiens; Chicago Black Hawks
- Playing career: 1944–1960

Gerald Joseph Wilfred Arthur Couture (August 6, 1925 — July 13, 1994) was a Canadian ice hockey centre. He played in the National Hockey League with the Detroit Red Wings, Montreal Canadiens, and Chicago Black Hawks between 1945 and 1954. As a member of the Red Wings, he won the Stanley Cup in 1950.

== Playing career ==
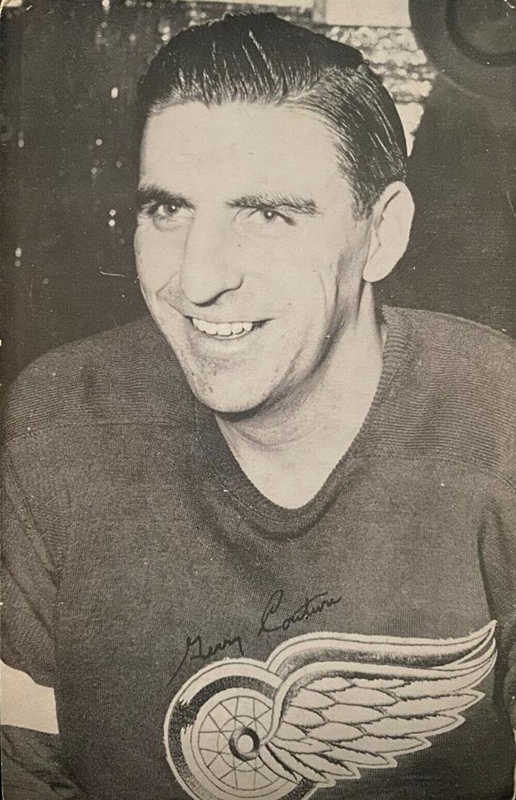
1948 postcard of Couture for the Detroit Red Wings

Couture started his National Hockey League career with the Detroit Red Wings in the 1945 Stanley Cup playoffs. He would also play for the Montreal Canadiens and Chicago Black Hawks. He left the NHL after the 1954 season. He played in the minors the rest of his career before retiring from hockey after 1960. He won the Stanley Cup in 1950 with the Detroit Red Wings.

== Career statistics ==
=== Regular season and playoffs ===
			Regular season					Playoffs
Season	Team	League	GP	G	A	Pts	PIM	GP	G	A	Pts	PIM
1940–41	Saskatoon Nutana	CAHS	—	—	—	—	—	—	—	—	—	—
1941–42	Saskatoon Quakers	NSJHL	8	12	6	18	0	6	9	5	14	0
1941–42	Saskatoon Quakers	M-Cup	—	—	—	—	—	3	1	0	1	0
1942–43	Saskatoon Quakers	NSJHL	8	14	10	24	26	3	4	1	5	2
1942–43	Saskatoon Quakers	M-Cup	—	—	—	—	—	8	14	7	21	2
1943–44	Saskatoon Quakers	NSJHL	1	1	1	2	2	—	—	—	—	—
1943–44	University of Saskatchewan	SAHA	2	6	3	9	2	1	3	1	4	2
1943–44	Saskatoon Navy	SSHL	11	15	11	26	9	2	1	1	2	2
1943–44	Flin Flon Bombers	Al-Cup	—	—	—	—	—	4	1	3	4	10
1944–45	University of Saskatchewan	N-SJHL	9	19	10	29	14	2	1	1	2	0
1944–45	Moose Jaw Canucks	S-SJHL	—	—	—	—	—	4	4	3	7	2
1944–45	Detroit Red Wings	NHL	—	—	—	—	—	2	0	0	0	0
1945–46	Detroit Red Wings	NHL	43	3	7	10	18	5	0	2	2	0
1946–47	Detroit Red Wings	NHL	30	5	10	15	0	1	0	0	0	0
1946–47	Indianapolis Capitals	AHL	34	24	18	42	21	—	—	—	—	—
1947–48	Detroit Red Wings	NHL	19	3	6	9	2	—	—	—	—	—
1947–48	Indianapolis Capitals	AHL	42	26	25	51	8	—	—	—	—	—
1948–49	Detroit Red Wings	NHL	51	19	10	29	6	10	2	0	2	2
1949–50	Detroit Red Wings	NHL	69	24	7	31	21	14	5	4	9	2
1950–51	Detroit Red Wings	NHL	52	7	6	13	2	6	1	1	2	0
1951–52	Montreal Canadiens	NHL	10	0	1	1	4	—	—	—	—	—
1951–52	Montreal Royals	QMHL	6	1	4	5	0	—	—	—	—	—
1951–52	Buffalo Bisons	AHL	9	2	3	5	2	—	—	—	—	—
1951–52	Cleveland Barons	AHL	38	21	19	40	2	5	1	0	1	0
1952–53	Chicago Black Hawks	NHL	70	19	18	37	22	7	1	0	1	0
1953–54	Chicago Black Hawks	NHL	40	6	5	11	14	—	—	—	—	—
1953–54	Providence Reds	AHL	19	10	7	17	2	—	—	—	—	—
1954–55	Calgary Stampeders	WHL	70	33	49	82	8	9	5	6	11	0
1955–56	Calgary Stampeders	WHL	66	32	50	82	10	8	3	7	10	8
1956–57	Calgary Stampeders	WHL	63	19	26	45	20	3	1	0	1	0
1957–58	Saskatoon Regals/St. Paul Saints	WHL	58	23	31	54	22	—	—	—	—	—
1959–60	Saskatoon Quakers	SSHL	23	26	29	55	26	7	7	13	20	0
1959–60	Saskatoon Quakers	Al-Cup	—	—	—	—	—	5	2	1	3	0
NHL totals			385	86	70	156	89	45	9	7	16	4
