= Walter Humeniuk =

Walter "Gunzo" Humeniuk (June 21, 1929 – 1987) was a trainer and backup goaltender for the Detroit Red Wings and the Chicago Black Hawks of the NHL for much of the 1950s and 1960s, although he was never officially listed as a player. Before joining the Red Wings he serves as the trainer for the Hettche Spitfires. He spent 1949 to 1951 with the Detroit Red Wings. Although born in Sudbury, Ontario he became a US citizen and joined the US Army to fight in the Korean War in 1951. He went to the Chicago Black Hawks in 1953. From 1953 to 1961, Humeniuk was the Blackhawks' backup goaltender and assistant trainer. He would win 2 Stanley Cup Championships in his career with Detroit in 1950 and Chicago in 1961. He remained with the Blackhawks organization until 1963. He would later open a hockey equipment store in suburban Berwyn, which burned in 1970, then re-opened in River Forest, Illinois. He was elected to the Illinois Hockey Hall of Fame in 2005.

== Awards and achievements ==
- 1950 Stanley Cup Championship (Detroit)
- 1961 Stanley Cup Championship (Chicago)
- 2005 Illinois Hockey Hall of Fame inductee
