= George Gee (ice hockey) =

Canadian ice hockey player (1922–1972)

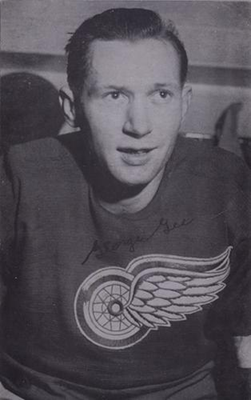
- Gee in 1948 postcard
- Born: June 28, 1922 Stratford, Ontario, Canada
- Died: January 14, 1972 (aged 49) Detroit, Michigan, U.S.
- Height: 5 ft 11 in (180 cm)
- Weight: 180 lb (82 kg; 12 st 12 lb)
- Position: Centre
- Shot: Left
- Played for: Chicago Black Hawks; Detroit Red Wings
- Playing career: 1941–1957

George Nathaniel "Hully" Gee (June 28, 1922 – January 14, 1972) was a Canadian ice hockey player who played for the Chicago Black Hawks and Detroit Red Wings of the National Hockey League between 1945 and 1954. He won the Stanley Cup with Detroit in 1950.

== Playing career ==
Gee began his NHL career with the Chicago Black Hawks in 1945–46. He played in Chicago until 1948 when he was traded four games into the season to the Detroit Red Wings. Gee's name was engraved on the Stanley Cup with Detroit in 1950. After three seasons in Detroit, he rejoined the Hawks for the start of the 1951–52 season and remained there until the end of his NHL career in 1954.

== Post-playing career ==
Gee died in 1972 while playing for the Detroit Red Wings oldtimers. In between the 2nd and 3rd period of a game, he went outside to smoke a cigarette and, while smoking, he had a severe heart attack and died.

== Career statistics ==
=== Regular season and playoffs ===
			Regular season					Playoffs
Season	Team	League	GP	G	A	Pts	PIM	GP	G	A	Pts	PIM
1939–40	Owen Sound Greys	OHA	11	8	2	10	10	—	—	—	—	—
1940–41	Falconbridge Falcons	GBHL	2	6	0	6	2	—	—	—	—	—
1941–42	Kansas City Americans	AHA	37	16	15	31	16	6	3	1	4	8
1942–43	Sudbury Frood Tigers	NBHL	9	15	4	19	14	3	4	1	5	2
1942–43	Sudbury Frood Tigers	Al-Cup	—	—	—	—	—	3	3	1	4	0
1943–44	Toronto Navy	OHA Sr	11	2	1	3	0	—	—	—	—	—
1943–44	Cornwallis Navy	NSDHL	17	18	9	27	—	—	—	—	—	—
1943–44	Cornwallis Navy	Al-Cup	—	—	—	—	—	12	14	10	24	11
1944–45	Cornwallis Navy	NSDHL	15	9	7	16	6	3	3	1	4	2
1945–46	Kansas City Pla-Mors	USHL	14	13	9	22	15	—	—	—	—	—
1945–46	Chicago Black Hawks	NHL	35	14	15	29	12	4	1	1	2	4
1946–47	Chicago Black Hawks	NHL	60	20	20	40	26	—	—	—	—	—
1947–48	Chicago Black Hawks	NHL	60	14	25	39	18	—	—	—	—	—
1948–49	Chicago Black Hawks	NHL	4	0	2	2	4	—	—	—	—	—
1948–49	Detroit Red Wings	NHL	47	7	12	19	29	10	1	3	4	22
1949–50	Detroit Red Wings	NHL	69	17	21	38	42	14	3	6	9	0
1950–51	Detroit Red Wings	NHL	70	17	20	37	19	6	0	1	1	0
1951–52	Chicago Black Hawks	NHL	70	18	31	49	39	—	—	—	—	—
1952–53	Chicago Black Hawks	NHL	67	18	21	39	99	7	1	2	3	6
1953–54	Chicago Black Hawks	NHL	69	10	16	26	59	—	—	—	—	—
1954–55	Windsor Bulldogs	OHA Sr	31	25	32	57	36	12	4	11	15	19
1955–56	Windsor Bulldogs	OHA Sr	44	24	18	42	36	—	—	—	—	—
1956–57	Windsor Bulldogs	OHA Sr	5	0	1	1	4	6	0	4	4	0
NHL totals			551	135	183	318	347	41	6	13	19	32
