= Jimmy Peters Sr. =

Canadian ice hockey player

- Jimmy Peters Sr. in 1960
- Born: October 2, 1922 Verdun, Quebec, Canada
- Died: October 11, 2006 (aged 84) Marquette, Michigan, U.S.
- Height: 5 ft 11 in (180 cm)
- Weight: 165 lb (75 kg; 11 st 11 lb)
- Position: Right wing
- Shot: Right
- Played for: Montreal Canadiens; Boston Bruins; Detroit Red Wings; Chicago Black Hawks
- Playing career: 1945–1956

James Meldrum "Shakey" Peters Sr. (October 2, 1922 – October 11, 2006) was a Canadian ice hockey player who played in the National Hockey League (NHL) between 1945 and 1954. He won the Stanley Cup three times, with the Montreal Canadiens in 1946, and with the Detroit Red Wings in 1950 and 1954.

== Playing career ==
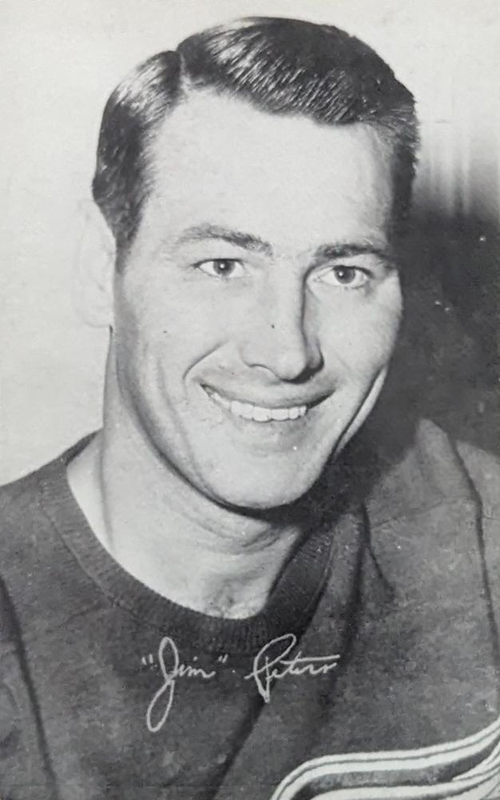
1949 postcard of Peters for Detroit Red Wings

Peters was born in Verdun, Quebec in 1922 and played with the Montreal Junior Canadiens of the QJHL in 1940–41. He then served with the Canadian Army during World War II. From 1945 to 1954, Peters played with the Montreal Canadiens -with whom he scored the overtime game-winning goal in game two of the Stanley Cup Final,- Boston Bruins, Detroit Red Wings and Chicago Black Hawks of the National Hockey League.

After he retired from hockey in 1956, Peters was a salesman in the Detroit area. He died in Marquette, Michigan in 2006. His son Jimmy Peters Jr. also played hockey for the Detroit Red Wings. His nephew Glen Currie played hockey for the Washington Capitals, as well as the Los Angeles Kings. During his three-year tenure with the Canadiens, he wore the number 19. In his 166 games with the Canadiens he scored 35 goals and 50 assists for 85 points, and added another 4 goals and 3 assists in 20 playoff games. He was traded to Boston with John Quilty for Joe Carveth.

== Career statistics ==
=== Regular season and playoffs ===
| | | | Regular season | | | | | Playoffs |
| Season | Team | League | GP | G | A | Pts | PIM | GP | G | A | Pts | PIM |
|---|---|---|---|---|---|---|---|---|---|---|---|---|
| 1939–40 | Verdun Maple Leafs | QJHL | 11 | 0 | 3 | 3 | 10 | 4 | 0 | 0 | 0 | 0 |
| 1939–40 | Verdun Maple Leafs | M-Cup | — | — | — | — | — | 7 | 1 | 3 | 4 | 0 |
| 1940–41 | Montreal Junior Canadiens | QJHL | 11 | 7 | 8 | 15 | 6 | 4 | 1 | 4 | 5 | 4 |
| 1940–41 | Montreal Senior Canadiens | QSHL | 1 | 0 | 0 | 0 | 0 | — | — | — | — | — |
| 1940–41 | Montreal Junior Royals | M-Cup | — | — | — | — | — | 16 | 8 | 11 | 19 | 22 |
| 1941–42 | Springfield Indians | AHL | 24 | 1 | 9 | 10 | 4 | 4 | 1 | 1 | 0 |
| 1942–43 | Montreal Army | MCHL | 5 | 3 | 5 | 8 | 4 | — | — | — | — | — |
| 1942–43 | Montreal Army | QSHL | 27 | 16 | 18 | 34 | 15 | 3 | 0 | 1 | 1 | 4 |
| 1943–44 | Montreal Army | MCHL | 2 | 0 | 0 | 0 | 0 | — | — | — | — | — |
| 1943–44 | Montreal Army | OHA Sr | 13 | 13 | 15 | 28 | 10 | — | — | — | — | — |
| 1945–46 | Montreal Canadiens | NHL | 47 | 11 | 19 | 30 | 10 | 9 | 3 | 1 | 4 | 6 |
| 1945–46 | Montreal Royals | QSHL | 1 | 1 | 0 | 1 | 0 | — | — | — | — | — |
| 1946–47 | Montreal Canadiens | NHL | 60 | 11 | 13 | 24 | 27 | 11 | 1 | 2 | 3 | 10 |
| 1947–48 | Montreal Canadiens | NHL | 22 | 1 | 3 | 4 | 6 | — | — | — | — | — |
| 1947–48 | Boston Bruins | NHL | 37 | 12 | 15 | 27 | 38 | 5 | 1 | 2 | 3 | 2 |
| 1948–49 | Boston Bruins | NHL | 60 | 16 | 15 | 31 | 8 | 4 | 0 | 1 | 1 | 0 |
| 1949–50 | Detroit Red Wings | NHL | 70 | 14 | 16 | 30 | 20 | 8 | 0 | 2 | 2 | 0 |
| 1950–51 | Detroit Red Wings | NHL | 68 | 17 | 21 | 38 | 14 | 6 | 0 | 0 | 0 | 0 |
| 1951–52 | Chicago Black Hawks | NHL | 70 | 15 | 21 | 36 | 16 | — | — | — | — | — |
| 1952–53 | Chicago Black Hawks | NHL | 69 | 22 | 19 | 41 | 16 | 7 | 0 | 1 | 1 | 4 |
| 1953–54 | Chicago Black Hawks | NHL | 46 | 6 | 4 | 10 | 21 | — | — | — | — | — |
| 1953–54 | Detroit Red Wings | NHL | 25 | 0 | 4 | 4 | 10 | 10 | 0 | 0 | 0 | 0 |
| 1954–55 | Windsor Bulldogs | OHA Sr | 46 | 25 | 31 | 56 | 62 | 12 | 10 | 7 | 17 | 2 |
| 1955–56 | Windsor Bulldogs | OHA Sr | 48 | 12 | 37 | 49 | 72 | — | — | — | — | — |
| NHL totals | | | 574 | 125 | 150 | 275 | 186 | 60 | 5 | 9 | 14 | 22 |
