= List of Grand Rapids Griffins players =

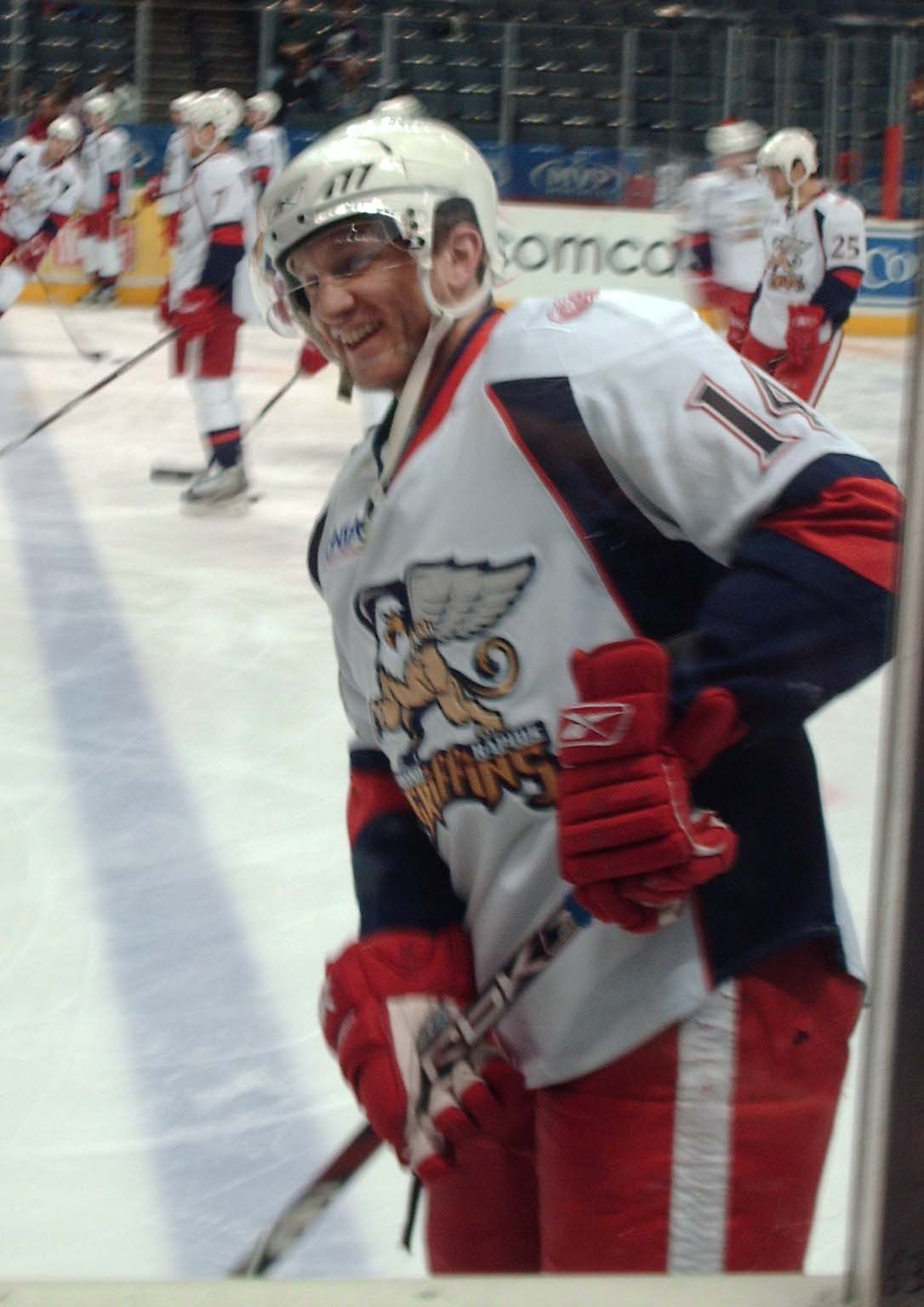
Carl Corazzini led the Griffins in scoring in the 2007–08 season.

The Grand Rapids Griffins are a professional ice hockey team based in Grand Rapids, Michigan. They are members of the North Division of the Western Conference in the American Hockey League (AHL). The team was founded in 1996 as an expansion franchise in the International Hockey League (IHL), and moved to the AHL following the IHL's folding in 2001. After playing their first three seasons as an independent team, Grand Rapids entered into an affiliation agreement with the Ottawa Senators in 1999. When that deal expired in 2002, the Griffins signed an agreement with the Detroit Red Wings. The two teams' current agreement lasts through the 2016–17 season. The Griffins won their first Calder Cup in 2013. Through the 2013–14 season, 460 players have played at least one game for the Grand Rapids Griffins, either in the regular season or in the playoffs.

One hundred thirty Griffins players have gone on to play in the National Hockey League (NHL);^{[a]} seventy-one of them made their NHL debut after skating for Grand Rapids. Nine former Griffins had their named engraved on the Stanley Cup as members of the Detroit Red Wings in 2008. While Detroit and Ottawa have been frequent NHL destinations for former members of the Griffins, owing to their respective affiliation tenures, every current NHL club has had a Griffins alumnus on its roster at some point. Numerous Griffins players have been recognized by the IHL or AHL for their play. Donald MacLean won the Les Cunningham Award as the AHL's most valuable player for the 2005–06 season; Niklas Kronwall won the Eddie Shore Award the previous season as the league's top defenseman. Derek King was a co-winner of the Leo P. Lamoureux Memorial Trophy for leading the IHL in scoring for the 2000–01 season. Eight Griffins have been named First Team All-Stars by either the IHL or the AHL.

Travis Richards, a member of the Griffins from their inception in 1996 until his retirement in 2006, is the franchise leader in games played (655). The team retired his jersey number 24 in November 2006. Michel Picard is the franchise leader in goals (158), assists (222) and points (380); Darryl Bootland leads the Griffins in penalty minutes (1164). For goaltenders, Joey MacDonald leads the franchise in games played (210), wins (109) and shutouts (20). The current captain of the Grand Rapids Griffins is Brian Lashoff; he is the seventeenth player to serve in that capacity.

== Key ==
* Made NHL debut after playing for Griffins.
† Appeared in a Griffins game during the 2021–22 season.
‡ Made NHL debut after playing for Griffins and appeared in a Griffins game during the 2021–22 season.

All players
Nat	Nationality
(Belarus)	Belarus
(Canada)	Canada
(Czech Republic)	Czech Republic
(Finland)	Finland
(Germany)	Germany
(Kazakhstan)	Kazakhstan
(Latvia)	Latvia
(Norway)	Norway

All players
Nat	Nationality
(Russia)	Russia
(Slovakia)	Slovakia
(Slovenia)	Slovenia
(Sweden)	Sweden
(Switzerland)	Switzerland
(Ukraine)	Ukraine
(United States)	United States

Goaltenders
GP	Games played
W	Wins
L	Losses
T	Ties
OTL	Overtime loss
SO	Shutouts
GAA	Goals against average
SV%	Save percentage

Skaters
Pos	Position
C	Center
D	Defenseman
LW	Left wing
RW	Right wing
GP	Games played
G	Goals
A	Assists
P	Points
PIM	Penalty minutes

== Goaltenders ==
Name	Nat	Seasons^{[b]}	Regular season							Playoffs						Notes
Name	Nat	Seasons^{[b]}	GP	W	L	T^{[c]}/OTL^{[d]}	SO	GAA	SV%	GP	W	L	SO	GAA	SV%	Notes
Alban, Chad	(United States)	2000–01; 2002–03	5	3	1	0	1	1.63	.938	—	—	—	—	—	—	
Ayers, Mike	(United States)	2004–05	1	0	0	0	0	6.02	.750	—	—	—	—	—	—	
Beaubien, Frederick	(Canada)	1999–00	1	0	0	0	0	4.07	.800	—	—	—	—	—	—	
Berkhoel, Adam	(United States)	2007–08	31	10	14	4	1	2.93	.888	—	—	—	—	—	—	
Boyle, Kevin	(United States)	2021	12	7	3	1	0	2.89	.883	—	—	—	—	—	—	
Brattstrom, Victor †	(Sweden)	2021–present	13	4	7	2	0	3.71	.885	—	—	—	—	—	—	
Brown, David	(Canada)	2010–11	2	0	0	0	0	3.75	.898	—	—	—	—	—	—	
Chouinard, Mathieu *	(Canada)	2000–02	53	28	19	2	3	2.57	.899	3	1	1	0	1.78	.935	2001–02 AHL Hap Holmes Memorial Award (co-winner)
Conklin, Ty	(United States)	2011–12	12	8	4	0	0	2.40	.915	—	—	—	—	—	—	
Coreau, Jared	(Canada)	2013–18	148	85	48	11	13	2.44	.918	26	18	8	1	2.66	0.915	
Cyr, Ryan	(Canada)	2006–07	1	0	0	0	0	1.63	.929	—	—	—	—	—	—	
Daigle, Sylvain	(Canada)	2000–01	1	0	1	0	0	5.00	.853	—	—	—	—	—	—	
Fountain, Mike	(Canada)	1999–01	88	55	17	10	9	2.24	.919	9	5	3	1	2.77	.897	2000–2001 IHL Second Team All-Star
Fulcher, Kaden †	(Canada)	2020–present	8	2	3	2	1	3.14	.894	—	—	—	—	—	—	
Gordon, Ian	(Canada)	1996–99	95	41	37	7	3	3.05	.895	3	0	2	0	3.52	.883	
Gustavsson, Jonas	(Sweden)	2013	1	1	0	0	0	1.00	.963	—	—	—	—	—	—	
Heeter, Cal	(United States)	2016-17	12	10	2	0	1	2.07	.933	—	—	—	—	—	—	
Howard, Jimmy *	(United States)	2005–09; 2017; 2019	192	94	75	11	14	2.67	.911	30	12	17	0	2.74	.899	2005–06 AHL All-Rookie Team
Hurme, Jani *	(Finland)	1999–00	52	29	15	4	4	2.18	.921	17	10	7	1	2.16	.924	1999–2000 IHL Second Team All-Star
Joseph, Curtis	(Canada)	2003–04	1	1	0	0	0	1.00	.952	—	—	—	—	—	—	
Kochan, Dieter *	(Canada)	1999–00	2	1	0	1	0	0.64	.970	—	—	—	—	—	—	
Koopmans, Logan	(Canada)	2005–06	1	0	1	0	0	7.54	.722	—	—	—	—	—	—	
Lacher, Blaine	(Canada)	1996–97	11	1	8	1	0	3.76	.877	—	—	—	—	—	—	
Lajeunesse, Simon *	(Canada)	2001–02	26	13	7	5	3	2.11	.916	2	0	0	0	2.82	.750	2001–02 AHL Hap Holmes Memorial Award (co-winner)
Lalime, Patrick	(Canada)	1997–98	31	10	10	9	2	2.61	.918	1	0	1	0	3.11	.892	
Lambert, Judd	(Canada)	2000–01	3	0	3	0	0	3.65	.859	—	—	—	—	—	—	
Lamothe, Marc	(Canada)	2002–04	103	54	34	13	10	2.10	.924	19	10	8	1	2.15	.926	2002–03 AHL Baz Bastien Memorial Award; 2002–03 AHL Hap Holmes Memorial Award (co-winner); 2002–03 AHL First Team All-Star
Larsson, Daniel	(Sweden)	2008–10	93	45	36	4	6	2.81	.905	—	—	—	—	—	—	
Larsson, Filip	(Sweden)	2019	7	2	5	0	0	4.01	.843	—	—	—	—	—	—	
Legace, Manny	(Canada)	2005–06	1	1	0	0	0	2.00	.909	—	—	—	—	—	—	
Little, Neil	(Canada)	1998–99	50	18	21	5	3	3.15	.894	—	—	—	—	—	—	
Liv, Stefan	(Sweden)	2006–07	34	15	15	2	2	3.01	.895	—	—	—	—	—	—	
MacDonald, Joey *	(Canada)	2002–07; 2010–12	210	109	77	11	20	2.44	.918	2	0	1	0	6.34	.815	2002–03 AHL Hap Holmes Memorial Award (co-winner)
Machovsky, Matej	(Czech Republic)	2018	4	1	1	1	0	2.43	.911	—	—	—	—	—	—	
MacIntyre, Drew *	(Canada)	2004–06	37	15	12	0	1	2.78	.900	5	3	1	0	1.62	.940	
Mazzoli, Pat	(Canada)	1996–97	5	2	0	0	0	3.56	.898	—	—	—	—	—	—	
McCollum, Tom *	(United States)	2009–16, 2017-18	263	123	105	14	8	2.76	.906	26	13	11	0	2.49	.916	2013 Calder Cup Champion
Moss, Tyler *	(Canada)	1996–97	15	5	6	1	0	2.94	.904	—	—	—	—	—	—	
Mrazek, Petr *	(Czech Republic)	2012–15	33	18	4	4	2	3.18	.897	34	20	14	4	2.40	.918	2013 Calder Cup Champion; 2013–14 AHL Second Team All-Star
Nagle, Pat	(United States)	2014–15	2	1	0	0	0	0.78	.971	—	—	—	—			
Osgood, Chris	(Canada)	2005–06	3	2	1	0	0	3.34	.882	—	—	—	—	—	—	
Pasquale, Eddie	(Canada)	2016–17	29	15	9	3	4	2.43	.919	1	0	0	0	0.00	1.000	2017 Calder Cup champion
Paterson, Jake	(Canada)	2015–16	2	0	2	0	0	3.11	.928	—	—	—	—	—	—	
Pearce, Jordan	(United States)	2008–12	69	24	26	1	2	3.18	.897	—	—	—	—	—	—	
Pickard, Calvin †	(Canada)	2019–present	72	36	25	10	4	2.66	.903	—	—	—	—	—	—	
Poulin, Kevin	(Canada)	2020	3	0	1	2	0	2.22	.915	—	—	—	—	—	—	
Prusek, Martin *	(Czech Republic)	2001–02	33	18	8	5	4	1.83	.930	5	2	3	0	2.16	.896	2001–02 AHL Baz Bastien Memorial Award; 2001–02 AHL Hap Holmes Memorial Award (co-winner); 2001–02 AHL First Team All-Star
Rybar, Patrik	(Slovakia)	2018–19	37	16	16	5	2	2.49	.908	—	-	—	-	—	-	
Reddick, Pokey	(Canada)	1996–98	71	35	19	10	6	2.62	.911	5	2	3	0	2.32	.916	1996–97 IHL Honorable Mention All-Star
Rudkowsky, Cody	(Canada)	2007–08	2	0	1	0	0	8.40	.818	—	—	—	—	—	—	
Sateri, Harri	(Finland)	2018–19	40	22	11	5	0	2.84	.899	5	2	3	0	2.67	0.911	
Turple, Dan	(Canada)	2007–08	1	0	0	0	0	3.00	.857	—	—	—	—	—	—	
Vicari, Dominic	(United States)	2006–07	1	0	1	0	0	10.40	.429	—	—	—	—	—	—	

== Skaters ==
Name	Nat	Pos	Seasons^{[b]}	Regular season					Playoffs					Notes
Name	Nat	Pos	Seasons^{[b]}	GP	G	A	Pts	PIM	GP	G	A	Pts	PIM	Notes
Abdelkader, Justin †	(United States)	LW	2008–10; 2022	112	35	41	76	190	10	6	2	8	23	
Adams, Bryan	(Canada)	LW	2002–03	74	8	17	25	37	13	2	0	2	4	
Adams, John	(United States)	D	2005–06	5	0	0	0	0	—	—	—	—	—	
Adams, Kevyn *	(United States)	C	1996–97	82	22	25	47	47	5	1	1	2	4	
Afanasenkov, Dmitry	(Russia)	LW	2001–02	18	1	2	3	2	—	—	—	—	—	
Aldridge, Keith	(United States)	D	2000–01	36	3	8	11	99	10	0	2	2	8	
Allen, Conor	(United States)	D	2016–17	56	1	10	11	49	—	-	—	-	—	
Allison, Scott	(Canada)	LW	1996–97	12	2	1	3	41	4	0	0	0	21	
Almqvist, Adam *	(Sweden)	D	2011–14	144	14	70	84	90	22	3	7	10	12	2013 Calder Cup champion 2013–14 AHL Second Team All-Star
Amadio, Greg †	(Canada)	D	2004–06; 2010–12	202	2	12	14	574	3	0	0	0	0	
Andersson, Joakim *	(Sweden)	C	2008–09; 2010–13; 2016	208	41	65	103	123	20	4	7	11	4	2013 Calder Cup champion
Angel, Brett	(Canada)	D	2005–06	4	0	0	0	5	—	—	—	—	—	
Anselmini, Brandon	(Canada)	D	2019	1	0	0	0	2	—	—	—	—	—	
Armstrong, Bill	(Canada)	C	1996–97	35	1	8	9	39	—	—	—	—	—	
Armstrong, Riley	(Canada)	RW	2009–10	17	3	2	5	14	—	—	—	—	—	
Ashe, Tom	(United States)	D	1997–99	129	6	15	21	122	3	1	0	1	6	
Athanasiou, Andreas *	(Canada)	LW	2013–16	83	25	26	51	34	28	7	8	15	14	
Atherton, P.J.	(United States)	D	2008–09	16	1	2	3	12	—	—	—	—	—	
Avery, Sean	(Canada)	C	2002–03	15	6	6	12	82	—	—	—	—	—	
Axelsson, Dick	(Sweden)	LW	2009–10	17	2	3	5	6	—	—	—	—	—	
Aubry, Louis-Marc	(Canada)	C	2011–17	342	32	54	86	271	39	4	1	5	16	2013 Calder Cup champion
Backman, Mattias	(Sweden)	D	2013–15	20	0	4	4	6	10	1	5	6	2	
Bala, Chris *	(United States)	LW	2001–02	70	21	16	37	9	4	0	1	1	0	
Ballantyne, Paul	(Canada)	D	2002–05	39	1	2	3	24	—	—	—	—	—	
Barber, Riley †	(United States)	RW	2021–present	55	28	25	53	36	—	-	—	-	—	
Barnes, Ryan *	(Canada)	LW	2002–05	211	18	27	45	493	19	1	1	2	24	
Barnes, Tyler	(United States)	F	2014–15	2	0	0	0	0	—	—	—	—	—	
Barney, Scott	(Canada)	RW	2006–07	40	4	8	12	26	—	—	—	—	—	
Barton, Seth †	(Canada)	D	2021–present	9	1	1	2	4	—	—	—	—	—	
Baseggio, Dave	(Canada)	D	1999–00	15	0	7	7	6	15	0	6	6	6	
Batyrshin, Ruslan	(Russia)	D	1997–98	22	0	2	2	54	—	—	—	—	—	
Baxter, Jim	(Canada)	D	2003–04	2	1	0	1	0	—	—	—	—	—	
Bayrack, Mike	(Canada)	LW	2001–02	2	0	0	0	0	—	—	—	—	—	
Beckett, Jason	(Canada)	D	2006–07	4	1	0	1	2	—	—	—	—	—	
Bednar, Jared	(Canada)	D	1998–99	74	3	18	21	220	—	—	—	—	—	
Berens, Sean	(United States)	C	2000–01	37	3	8	11	26	4	0	0	0	0	
Berggren, Jonatan †	(Sweden)	LW	2021–present	46	14	22	36	8	—	—	—	—	—	
Berry, Matt †	(United States)	RW	2021–present	19	2	4	6	10	—	—	—	—	—	
Berschbach, Shane	(United States)	LW	2014–15	5	0	0	0	0	—	—	—	—	—	
Bertuzzi, Tyler *	(Canada)	LW	2014–18	137	32	50	82	204	42	23	16	39	68	
Bicanek, Radim	(Czech Republic)	D	1998–99	46	8	17	25	48	—	—	—	—	—	
Billins, Chad *	(Canada)	D	2012–13	76	10	27	37	4	24	2	12	14	12	2013 Calder Cup champion
Bilotto, Nic	(Canada)	D	2003–04	4	0	1	1	0	1	0	0	0	0	
Bjork, Anders	(Sweden)	C	1998–99	35	8	6	14	17	—	—	—	—	—	
Black, James	(Canada)	RW	2001–02	29	6	10	16	10	—	—	—	—	—	
Blanchard, Sean	(Canada)	D	2000–01	10	0	0	0	7	—	—	—	—	—	
Blouin, Jean	(Canada)	RW	1996–97	1	0	0	0	0	—	—	—	—	—	
Boileau, Patrick	(Canada)	D	2002–03	23	2	11	13	39	—	—	—	—	—	
Boisvert, Hugo	(Canada)	C	2001–04	232	38	47	85	164	24	6	4	10	22	
Boivin, Claude	(Canada)	LW	1997–98	31	12	5	17	69	3	0	0	0	8	
Bonello, Brad	(Canada)	C	2005–06	8	0	1	1	12	—	—	—	—	—	
Bonis, Kyle	(Canada)	RW	2014–15	3	0	0	0	0	—	—	—	—	—	
Bonni, Ryan	(Canada)	D	2003–04	54	1	6	7	98	4	0	0	0	8	
Bootland, Darryl *	(Canada)	RW	2002–07	293	72	68	140	1164	41	9	10	19	130	
Borkowski, Mike	(Canada)	C	2016–18	59	3	2	5	3	0	0	0	0		
Bouchard, Joel	(Canada)	D	2000–01	19	3	9	12	8	—	—	—	—	—	
Bouchard, Robin	(Canada)	RW	2004–05	4	0	1	1	6	—	—	—	—	—	
Bowey, Madison	(Canada)	RW	2019	1	0	1	1	2	—	—	—	—	—	
Bradford, Erik †	(Canada)	C	2021–present	16	0	3	3	6	—	—	—	—	—	
Brimanis, Aris	(United States)	D	1998–99	66	16	21	37	70	—	—	—	—	—	
Brisson, David	(Canada)	RW	2003–04	33	3	1	4	2	—	—	—	—	—	
Brome, Mathias	(Canada)	D	2001–03	75	2	12	14	160	15	1	3	4	28	
Brookbank, Sheldon *	(Canada)	D	2001–03	75	2	12	14	160	15	1	3	4	28	
Brookbank, Wade *	(Canada)	D	2001–02	73	1	6	7	337	3	0	1	1	14	
Brooks, Brendan	(Canada)	RW	2006–07	51	9	8	17	44	—	—	—	—	—	
Brule, Eric	(Canada)	D	2000–01	2	0	0	0	0	—	—	—	—	—	
Brunnstrom, Fabian	(Sweden)	LW	2011–12	45	12	23	35	41	—	—	—	—	—	
Bruton, Chris	(Canada)	RW	2014-15	52	2	2	4	124	—	—	—	—	—	
Buckberger, Ashley	(Canada)	RW	1998–99	11	1	2	3	0	—	—	—	—	—	
Bullock, Greg	(Canada)	C	1997–98	35	9	19	28	58	3	0	1	1	4	
Burke, Gerry	(United States)	D	2006–07	2	0	0	0	0	—	—	—	—	—	
Butsayev, Slava	(Russia)	C	1999–01	143	61	70	131	150	27	5	17	22	42	
Caito, Matt	(United States)	D	2016–17	13	1	1	2	6	—	—	—	—	—	
Callahan, Mitch *	(United States)	RW	2011–17	365	94	92	186	422	60	13	21	34	66	2013 Calder Cup champion
Cameron, Scott	(Canada)	LW	2005–06	3	0	0	0	2	—	—	—	—	—	
Campbell, Colin	(Canada)	F	2013–19	319	40	58	98	215	45	4	6	10	30	
Campbell, Ed	(United States)	D	2002–03	80	0	12	12	140	15	0	1	1	22	
Campbell, Jeff	(Canada)	LW	2006–07	61	10	21	31	2	5	0	0	0	2	
Camper, Carter	(United States)	C	2018–19	67	17	33	50	24	5	0	3	3	0	
Carlisle, Chris	(United States)	D	2018	2	0	1	1	7	—	-	—	-	—	
Charleston, Dan	(United States)	LW	2008–09	3	0	0	0	4	—	—	—	—	—	
Carey, Matt	(Canada)	LW	2017	8	1	1	2	9	—	—	—	—	—	
Chaulk, Colin	(Canada)	C	2001–02	13	3	1	4	15	2	0	1	1	2	
Chelios, Chris	(United States)	D	2008–09	2	0	1	1	2	—	—	—	—	—	
Chelios, Jake *	(United States)	D	2018–19	61	1	14	15	28	4	0	0	0	7	
Cholowski, Dennis	(Canada)	D	2016–21	69	6	29	35	26	6	0	2	2	2	
Chouinard, Joel	(Canada)	D	2015–16	11	1	3	4	0	—	—	—	—	—	
Ciernik, Ivan	(Slovakia)	LW	1999–02	134	42	51	93	117	16	5	12	17	28	2000–01 IHL Honorable Mention All-Star; 2000–01 IHL Plus/Minus Award
Cipruss, Aigars	(Latvia)	C	1996–97	1	0	1	1	0	—	—	—	—	—	
Clancy, Greg	(Canada)	C	1997–98	49	9	3	12	26	—	—	—	—	—	
Clark, Neil	(Canada)	LW	2007–08	14	0	0	0	14	—	—	—	—	—	
Cleary, Daniel	(Canada)	F	2015–16	35	3	12	15	8	9	0	0	0	6	
Coetzee, Willie	(Canada)	RW	2009–13	89	11	16	27	33	—	—	—	—	—	
Cole, Danton	(United States)	RW/C	1996–00	190	35	42	77	110	8	4	2	6	2	1998–99 Team captain
Coles, Bruce	(Canada)	LW	1998–99	15	1	7	8	10	—	—	—	—	—	
Collins, Rob *	(Canada)	C/RW	2001–03	78	11	22	33	16	15	3	8	11	10	
Colaiacovo, Carlo	(Canada)	D	2012–13	2	0	0	0	0	—	—	—	—	—	
Conner, Chris	(United States)	RW	2011–12	57	16	37	53	22	—	—	—	—	—	
Corazzini, Carl	(United States)	RW	2007–08	80	24	36	60	14	—	—	—	—	—	
Cornforth, Mark	(Canada)	D	1997–98	8	1	2	3	20	3	0	0	0	17	
Corpse, Keli	(Canada)	C	1996–97	19	3	4	7	2	—	—	—	—	—	
Crawford, Marcus	(Canada)	D	2018–19	8	0	0	0	4	—	—	—	—	—	
Criscuolo, Kyle †	(United States)	C	2015-17; 2020-present	147	40	49	89	44	19	5	4	9	14	2017 Calder Cup Champion
Crosty, Paul	(Canada)	D	2009–10	58	0	2	2	170	—	—	—	—	—	
Crowley, Mike	(United States)	D	2000–01	22	4	12	16	10	—	—	—	—	—	
Cullen, Mark	(United States)	C	2007–08	59	16	31	47	61	—	—	—	—	—	2007–08 Team captain^{[e]}
Curry, Patrick †	(United States)	LW	2021–present	38	5	2	7	33	—	—	—	—	—	
Curtin, Luke	(United States)	LW	1998–99	4	0	0	0	2	—	—	—	—	—	
Czarnowczan, Scott	(United States)	D	2014–16	31	2	8	10	30	—	—	—	—	—	
D'astous, Charle-Edouard	(Canada)	D	2020–21	17	1	4	5	8	—	—	—	—	—	
Daavettila, Trent	(United States)	LW	2009–11	3	1	0	1	0	—	—	—	—	—	
DaCosta, Jeff	(Canada)	D	2000–01	1	0	0	0	2	—	—	—	—	—	
Dahlman, Toni *	(Finland)	RW	2001–02	50	6	8	14	25	4	0	0	0	0	
DeKeyser, Danny	(United States)	D	2013–14	—	-	—	-	—	6	0	1	1	8	2013 Calder Cup champion
Dello, Tory	(United States)	D	2020-21	20	0	2	2	14	—	—	—	—	—	
Delmore, Andy	(Canada)	D	2009–10	54	5	15	20	32	—	—	—	—	—	
Demidov, Ilja	(Russia)	D	2000–01	61	1	5	6	73	2	0	1	1	21	
Demitra, Pavol	(Slovakia)	LW	1996–97	42	20	30	50	24	—	—	—	—	—	
DeSantis, Mark	(Canada)	D	1998–99	7	0	0	0	9	—	—	—	—	—	
DiCasmirro, Nate	(United States)	RW	2005–06	72	16	36	52	97	16	3	3	6	20	
Dickinson, Josh †	(Canada)	RW	2005–06	72	16	36	52	97	16	3	3	6	20	
Dobbin, Brian	(Canada)	RW	1996–97	29	4	5	9	39	—	—	—	—	—	
Doig, Jason	(Canada)	D	2001–02	57	1	17	18	103	5	0	0	0	18	
Dolyny, Rustyn	(Canada)	RW	2002–03	1	0	0	0	2	—	—	—	—	—	
Downey, Aaron	(Canada)	RW	2008–09	65	2	7	9	126	10	0	1	1	44	
Drevitch, Scott	(United States)	D	1997–98	3	0	0	0	0	—	—	—	—	—	
Eaton, Mark	(United States)	D	2004–05	29	3	3	6	21	—	—	—	—	—	
Eaves, Patrick	(Canada)	RW	2013–14	8	4	2	6	8	—	—	—	—	—	
Edwardson, Derek	(United States)	C	2004–05	3	0	0	0	0	—	—	—	—	—	
Ehn, Christoffer *	(Sweden)	C	2018–19	17	2	5	7	8	5	0	2	2	2	
Ehrhardt, Travis	(Canada)	D	2009–12	135	5	22	27	99	—	—	—	—	—	
Eldred, Matt	(United States)	D	2002–03	2	0	0	0	0	—	—	—	—	—	
Elick, Mickey	(Canada)	D	1998–99	17	3	6	9	8	—	—	—	—	—	
Elkins, Corey	(United States)	C	2017–18	76	9	11	20	26	5	0	1	1	0	
Ellis, Matt *	(Canada)	C/LW	2003–07	282	69	84	153	187	27	8	4	12	26	2005–07 Team captain
Elson, Turner †	(Canada)	C	2017–present	269	53	73	126	214	10	4	2	6	0	
Emmerton, Cory *	(Canada)	LW/C	2006–11; 2013–14	270	50	106	156	80	21	3	7	10	4	
Emmons, John *	(United States)	C	1999–2001	73	11	16	27	82	16	1	4	5	28	
Engelhardt, Brett	(United States)	RW	2007–08	42	8	8	16	33	—	—	—	—	—	
Ericsson, Jonathan *	(Sweden)	D	2006–09; 2019	186	17	63	80	241	7	0	0	0	8	
Esposito, Luke	(United States)	C	2017–18	31	1	7	8	10	5	0	1	1	2	
Estoclet, Adam	(United States)	LW	2011–12	12	1	1	2	4	—	—	—	—	—	
Evans, Brennan	(United States)	D	2012–15	198	5	23	28	330	50	4	8	10	97	2013 Calder Cup champion
Exelby, Garnet	(Canada)	D	2011–12	75	7	14	21	177	—	—	—	—	—	2011–12 Team captain
Fair, Quinn	(Canada)	D	1996–97	2	0	0	0	0	—	—	—	—	—	
Feasby, Scott	(Canada)	D	1997–98	4	0	1	1	0	—	—	—	—	—	
Ference, Brad	(Canada)	D	2007–08	32	1	1	2	78	—	—	—	—	—	
Ferraro, Landon *	(Canada)	C	2009–10; 2011–15	270	75	65	140	204	33	6	13	19	13	2013 Calder Cup champion
Fiebelkorn, Jed	(United States)	RW	1998–99	5	0	2	2	5	—	—	—	—	—	
Filppula, Ilari	(Finland)	C	2010–11	76	20	44	64	24	—	—	—	—	—	
Filppula, Valtteri *	(Finland)	C	2005–07	77	22	52	74	32	16	7	9	16	4	
Finn, Matt	(Canada)	D	2018	4	1	0	1	2	—	—	—	—	—	
Fojtík, Josef	(Czech Republic)	LW	2007–08	13	0	2	2	12	—	—	—	—	—	
Ford, Matthew	(United States)	LW	2016–20	236	57	67	124	152	24	10	7	17	34	2017–20 Team captain 2017 Calder Cup champion
Frappier, Shawn	(Canada)	D	1996–97	3	0	0	0	0	—	—	—	—	—	
Frederick, Joe	(United States)	RW	1998–99	45	23	18	41	98	—	—	—	—	—	
Frk, Martin *	(Czech Republic)	RW	2013–17; 2018-19	227	68	64	132	191	29	7	17	24	38	2017 Calder Cup champion
Fournier, Gleason	(Canada)	D	2011–14	68	2	10	12	41	7	0	2	2	4	2013 Calder Cup champion
Gagnon, Aaron *	(Canada)	C	2008–09	61	8	11	19	28	10	1	2	3	2	
Gagnon, Sean	(Canada)	D	2000–01	70	4	16	20	226	10	2	3	5	30	
Galvin, Tom	(United States)	D	2006–10	191	3	37	40	120	10	1	2	3	8	
Gazzola, Randy †	(Canada)	D	2021–present	2	0	0	0	0	—	-	—	-	—	
Gelech, Randall	(Canada)	RW	2007–09	75	7	8	15	39	—	—	—	—	—	
Gervais, Victor	(Canada)	C	1996–97	14	2	4	6	16	—	—	—	—	—	
Giroux, Alexandre *	(Canada)	C	2001–02	70	11	16	27	74	8	1	0	1	4	
Glendening, Luke *	(United States)	C	2012-14	69	13	25	38	20	68	24	6	10	30	2013 Calder Cup Champion
Goldmann, Erich *	(Germany)	D	1999–00	26	1	1	2	15	—	—	—	—	—	
Gorovikov, Konstantin	(Russia)	C	1999–01	125	16	33	49	78	8	1	0	1	4	
Goulet, Stephane	(Canada)	RW	2006–07	2	0	0	0	2	—	—	—	—	—	
Gove, David *	(United States)	C	2001–02	17	2	4	6	8	—	—	—	—	—	
Grant, Triston	(Canada)	LW	2012–14; 2015–16	132	10	16	26	318	28	2	2	4	30	2013 Calder Cup Champion
Greenough, Nick	(Canada)	RW	2002–03	18	2	1	3	51	—	—	—	—	—	
Greig, Mark	(Canada)	RW	1997–98	69	26	36	62	103	3	0	4	4	4	
Grewe, Albin	(Sweden)	LW	2021	11	0	2	2	6	—	-	—	-	—	
Grigorenko, Igor	(Russia)	RW	2007–08	5	0	0	0	4	—	—	—	—	—	
Grimes, Kevin	(Canada)	D	1999–01	9	0	0	0	17	—	—	—	—	—	
Groulx, Danny	(Canada)	D	2002–05	203	12	31	43	235	10	0	1	1	7	
Gruden, John	(United States)	D	1999–02	141	10	37	47	90	27	3	8	11	18	2001–02 AHL First Team All-Star
Hachborn, Len	(Canada)	C	1996–97	19	2	2	4	6	—	—	—	—	—	
Hackert, Michael	(Germany)	LW	2005–06	16	0	3	3	14	—	—	—	—	—	
Hall, Mike	(Canada)	C	2000–01	7	1	0	1	0	—	—	—	—	—	
Hamilton, Trevor	(United States)	D	2018–19	17	1	2	3	8	—	—	—	—	—	
Hankinson, Ben	(United States)	RW	1996–97	68	16	13	29	219	5	2	2	4	4	
Harrold, Josh	(United States)	D	2000–01	14	0	2	2	4	—	—	—	—	—	
Hartigan, Mark	(Canada)	C	2007–08	48	23	19	42	76	—	—	—	—	—	
Hartlieb, Ernie	(United States)	LW	2004–05	44	3	6	9	23	—	—	—	—	—	
Hay, Darrell	(Canada)	D	2007–08	4	0	1	1	2	—	—	—	—	—	
Haydar, Darren	(Canada)	RW	2008–09	79	31	49	80	26	10	4	7	11	4	2008–09 Team captain
Hedden, Mike	(Canada)	LW	2010–11	3	0	1	1	2	—	—	—	—	—	
Helm, Darren *	(Canada)	C	2007–09; 2013–14	124	29	39	68	54	—	—	—	—	—	
Helmer, Bryan	(Canada)	D	2004–06	160	19	62	81	202	16	1	8	9	24	2005–06 AHL Second Team All-Star
Henkel, Jim	(United States)	C	2003–04	15	2	1	3	4	—	—	—	—	—	
Hicketts, Joe *	(Canada)	D	2016–21	286	16	102	118	176	29	1	10	11	18	2017 Calder Cup champion
Hillman, Blake †	(United States)	D	2019–present	15	0	3	3	6	—	-	—	-	—	
Himelfarb, Eric	(Canada)	C	2003–07	214	46	60	106	181	27	1	3	4	24	
Hirose, Taro †	(Canada)	F	2019–present	112	22	75	97	26	—	-	—	-	—	
Hirschfeld, Alden	(United States)	F	2013–16	30	2	3	5	19	6	1	0	1	2	
Hlushko, Todd	(Canada)	LW	1998–99	82	24	26	50	78	—	—	—	—	—	
Hnidy, Shane *	(Canada)	D	1997–98; 2000–01	79	6	12	18	212	3	0	2	2	23	
Hocking, Justin	(Canada)	D	2000–01	6	0	0	0	12	—	—	—	—	—	
Hoggan, Jeff	(Canada)	LW	2012–16	278	57	62	119	123	59	11	16	27	56	2012-16 Team captain 2013 Calder Cup Champion
Holmstrom, Axel	(Sweden)	C	2016–19	138	20	33	53	12	6	1	1	2	0	2017 Calder Cup champion
Holway, Patrick	(United States)	D	2021	6	0	0	0	0	—	-	—	-	—	
Hronek, Filip *	(Czech Republic)	D	2016–19	108	19	46	65	93	12	0	4	4	48	2017 Calder Cup champion
Hudler, Jiri	(Czech Republic)	C/LW	2003–06	185	65	114	179	112	20	7	21	28	22	2005–06 AHL Second Team All-Star
Huffman, Kerry	(Canada)	D	1997–99	77	4	24	28	66	3	0	0	0	2	1997–98 Team captain
Hulak, Derek	(Canada)	LW	2018–19	35	1	3	4	6	4	1	1	2	0	
Hull, Jody	(Canada)	RW	2001–02	3	2	1	3	2	—	—	—	—	—	
Humitz, Max †	(United States)	LW	2021–present	17	4	4	8	2	—	—	—	—	—	
Hurd, Kelly	(Canada)	RW	1996–97	4	0	1	1	4	—	—	—	—	—	
Hussey, Marc	(Canada)	D	1998–99	13	0	6	6	14	—	—	—	—	—	
Hussey, Matt	(United States)	LW	2006–07	75	15	29	44	36	6	1	1	2	2	
Hutchins, Jeff	(Canada)	LW	2004–05	12	1	0	1	45	—	—	—	—	—	
Hymovitz, David	(United States)	LW	2001–02	80	15	33	48	22	5	1	2	3	0	
Insana, Jon	(United States)	D	2004–08	125	4	19	23	69	5	1	0	1	4	
Jackson, Jim	(United States)	D	2006–07	1	0	0	0	0	—	—	—	—	—	
Jackson, Todd	(United States)	RW	2004–06	35	0	3	3	12	—	—	—	—	—	
Janik, Doug	(United States)	D	2009–12	193	21	71	92	235	—	—	—	—	—	
Janmark-Nylen, Mattias *	(Sweden)	C	2013–14	2	0	0	0	2	6	0	1	1	0	
Jarnkrok, Calle *	(Sweden)	C	2010–13	66	13	26	39	14	—	—	—	—	—	
Jenks, A.J.	(United States)	RW	2015	5	2	1	3	5	—	—	—	—	—	
Jensen, Nick *	(United States)	D	2013–17	222	10	51	61	46	35	0	6	6	6	
Jasecko, Stanislav	(Slovakia)	D	1996–97	62	3	15	18	48	—	—	—	—	—	
Johansson, Jonas	(Sweden)	RW	2006–07	12	3	2	5	10	—	—	—	—	—	
Johnson, Cory	(Canada)	LW	1996–98	20	1	2	3	8	—	—	—	—	—	
Johnson, Jamie	(Canada)	C	2010–12	154	33	63	96	66	—	—	—	—	—	
Jorde, Ryan	(Canada)	D	2005–06	3	0	0	0	2	—	—	—	—	—	
Jozsa, Jason	(Canada)	D	2007–08	73	2	11	13	42	10	0	5	5	7	
Jurco, Tomas *	(Slovakia)	RW	2012–16	113	33	38	71	46	32	13	8	21	32	2013 Calder Cup champion
Kaminsky, Yan	(Russia)	LW	1998–99	7	0	2	2	0	—	—	—	—	—	
Karlander, Kory	(Canada)	LW/C	1998–00; 2003–05; 2007–08	171	25	40	65	208	4	0	0	0	0	
Kaski, Oliwer	(Finland)	D	2019	19	2	3	5	12	—	-	—	-	—	
Keefe, Adam	(Canada)	RW	2006–08; 2010–11	88	4	6	10	318	—	—	—	—	—	
Keller, Ryan *	(Canada)	RW	2005–07	48	10	8	18	40	13	0	0	0	0	
Kelly, Brent	(Canada)	C	2004–05	22	3	4	7	4	—	—	—	—	—	
Kelly, Chris *	(Canada)	C	2001–02	31	3	3	6	20	5	1	1	2	5	
Kenny, Shane	(Canada)	D	1999–00	24	1	1	2	38	—	—	—	—	—	
Kindl, Jakub *	(Czech Republic)	D	2005–11; 2014-17	249	17	77	94	239	17	2	3	5	2	
King, D.J. †	(United States)	D	2021–present	2	0	1	1	0	—	-	—	-	—	
King, Derek	(Canada)	LW	1999–01; 2002–04	264	73	130	203	83	46	16	25	41	18	1999–2000 IHL Honorable Mention All-Star; 2000–01 IHL Leo P. Lamoureux Trophy (co-winner); 2000–01 IHL First Team All-Star
Kinley, Cleve	(Canada)	D	2006–08	11	0	2	2	4	—	—	—	—	—	
Knox, Ryan	(Canada)	D	2001–03	27	5	6	11	14	1	0	0	0	2	
Kolanos, Krys	(Canada)	C	2006–07	17	6	6	12	8	—	—	—	—	—	
Kolosov, Sergei	(Belarus)	D	2008–11	192	6	14	20	113	10	0	0	0	9	
Kopecky, Tomas *	(Slovakia)	LW/RW	2002–06	243	63	75	138	218	31	3	4	7	33	
Kordic, Dan	(Canada)	D	1998–99	3	0	0	0	0	—	—	—	—	—	
Kroll, Johann	(United States)	D	2009–10	2	0	0	0	2	—	—	—	—	—	
Kronwall, Niklas *	(Sweden)	D	2003–06	102	15	51	66	73	—	—	—	—	—	2004–05 AHL Eddie Shore Award; 2004–05 AHL First Team All-Star
Kuffner, Ryan	(Canada)	LW	2019-20	32	6	3	9	2	—	—	—	—	—	
Kruppke, Gord	(Canada)	D	1998–99	42	0	5	5	93	—	—	—	—	—	
Kuparinen, Mikko	(Finland)	D	1998–99	19	0	2	2	35	—	—	—	—	—	
Kwiatkowski, Joel *	(Canada)	D	2000–02	142	12	38	50	152	15	2	2	4	16	2000–01 IHL Honorable Mention All-Star
LaFleur, Brian	(United States)	D	1998–99	4	0	0	0	2	—	—	—	—	—	
Landry, Jon	(United States)	D	2010–11	1	0	0	0	0	—	—	—	—	—	
Langfeld, Josh *	(United States)	RW	2001–02; 2006–07	106	34	35	69	73	5	2	0	2	0	
Larkin, Dylan *	(United States)	C	2015	—	—	—	—	—	6	3	2	5	6	
Lashoff, Brian ‡	(United States)	D	2008–13; 2014–present	553	30	87	117	287	75	5	15	20	34	2013 Calder Cup champion 2017 Calder Cup champion Team captain since 2021.
Lavigne, Eric	(Canada)	D	1997–98	4	0	1	1	13	—	—	—	—	—	
Lebda, Brett *	(United States)	D	2003–06	111	6	25	31	76	15	1	4	5	10	
Legault, Jay	(Canada)	RW	2004–05	2	0	0	0	0	—	—	—	—	—	
Leino, Ville *	(Finland)	RW	2008–09	57	15	31	46	18	10	3	10	13	10	
Lemieux, Francis	(Canada)	RW	2007–10	105	21	29	50	96	7	0	1	1	8	
Lepine, Jason	(Canada)	D	2010–11	1	0	2	2	2	—	—	—	—	—	
Leroux, Francois	(Canada)	D	1998–99	13	1	1	2	22	—	—	—	—	—	
Lilja, Andreas	(Sweden)	D	2009–10	4	0	0	0	6	—	—	—	—	—	
Lindberg, Chris	(Canada)	LW	1997–98	18	8	14	22	25	—	—	—	—	—	
Linden, Jamie	(Canada)	RW	1996–98	50	8	9	17	143	6	1	1	2	4	
Lindstrom, Gustav *	(Sweden)	D	2019–21	58	0	8	8	34	—	-	—	-	—	
Loggins, Troy	(United States)	LW	2019–21	37	5	5	10	10	—	-	—	-	—	
Lorito, Matt *	(Canada)	RW	2016–18	120	45	60	105	53	19	7	6	13	4	2017 Calder Cup champion
Lozhkin, Aleksey	(Belarus)	LW	1998–99	10	1	2	3	4	—	—	—	—	—	
Luciuk, Andrew	(Canada)	C	2002–03	2	1	0	1	4	—	—	—	—	—	
Lundbohm, Bryan	(United States)	C	2004–05	3	0	0	0	0	—	—	—	—	—	
Lukosevicius, Jarid	(Canada)	RW	2019–21	46	7	3	10	31	1	0	0	0	0	
MacLean, Cail	(Canada)	RW	2000–01	16	2	0	2	0	—	—	—	—	—	
MacLean, Donald	(Canada)	LW/C	1998–99; 2005–06	104	62	45	107	71	14	6	2	8	8	2005–06 AHL Les Cunningham Award; 2005–06 AHL Willie Marshall Award (co-winner); 2005–06 AHL First Team All-Star
MacLeod, Gregor	(United States)	C	2019-21	39	5	9	14	17	—	-	—	-	—	
Manlow, Eric	(Canada)	C	2004–06	141	46	68	114	68	16	3	3	6	12	
Manning, Blair	(Canada)	C	1996–98	10	1	1	2	4	1	0	1	1	0	
Mantha, Anthony *	(Canada)	C	2014–17	132	44	44	88	102	25	6	9	15	24	
Marchenko, Alexei *	(Russia)	D	2013–16	104	6	32	38	42	11	0	4	4	2	
Martens, Nick	(United States)	D	2005–06	67	4	12	16	54	7	0	1	1	2	
Martin, Jon †	(Canada)	RW	2021–present	40	3	7	10	32	—	-	—	-	—	
Martins, Steve	(Canada)	C	2001–02	51	10	21	31	66	3	0	0	0	0	
Mason, Wes	(Canada)	LW	2001–02	6	1	0	1	4	—	—	—	—	—	
Matzka, Scott	(United States)	C	2001–02	4	1	0	1	2	—	—	—	—	—	
Maurice, Mike	(Canada)	C	1996–97; 1999–01	14	1	4	5	5	3	0	2	2	0	
May, Brad	(Canada)	LW	2009–10	17	5	5	10	40	—	—	—	—	—	
McBain, Jason	(Canada)	D	1999–00	16	1	6	7	23	15	2	5	7	12	
McCann, Sean	(Canada)	D	1996–97	76	8	26	34	46	5	0	0	0	2	
McCarron, Patrick	(Canada)	D	2017-18; 2020	5	0	1	1	0	—	-	—	-	—	
McCarthy, Jeremiah	(United States)	D	2002–03	11	0	1	1	2	12	0	1	1	6	
McCarty, Darren	(Canada)	RW	2007–09	32	10	11	21	42	10	3	1	4	8	
McCrea, Alec	(United States)	D	2019–21	42	0	6	6	19	—	-	—	-	—	
McDonell, Kent	(Canada)	RW	2005–06	77	21	37	58	171	16	5	4	9	20	
McGrath, Evan	(Canada)	C	2006–10	262	49	66	115	116	7	0	0	0	0	
McIlrath, Dylan	(Canada)	D	2017-21	222	10	37	47	402	28	0	5	5	39	
McIntyre, David	(Canada)	C	2013–14	64	8	13	21	45	10	1	1	2	9	
McIsaac, Jared †	(United States)	D	2021–present	58	5	15	20	24	—	—	—	—	—	
McKenzie, Brett †	(Canada)	C	2013–14	64	8	13	21	45	10	1	1	2	9	
McSorley, Marty	(Canada)	D	2000–01	14	0	2	2	36	—	—	—	—	—	
McSween, Don	(United States)	D	1996–98	77	7	20	27	70	3	0	1	1	8	1996–97 Team captain
Meech, Derek *	(Canada)	D	2004–08; 2010–11	304	27	75	102	246	23	0	3	3	8	
Megan, Wade	(United States)	C	2018–19	48	19	18	37	44	5	2	0	2	16	
Metcalfe, Jason	(Canada)	D	1999–00	2	0	0	0	9	—	—	—	—	—	
Metropolit, Glen *	(Canada)	C	1997–99	156	48	88	136	182	3	1	1	2	0	1998–99 IHL Honorable Mention All-Star
Miele, Andy	(United States)	C	2014–16	146	44	88	132	119	25	5	16	21	32	2014-15 AHL First All-Star Team
Millar, Craig	(Canada)	D	2000–01	12	1	2	3	2	—	—	—	—	—	
Miller, Drew	(United States)	LW	2017	7	2	1	3	0	—	-	—	-	—	
Miller, Kelly	(United States)	LW	1999–00	26	4	4	8	8	7	0	1	1	2	
Miller, Kevin	(United States)	C/RW	1999–2000; 2003–04	137	47	55	102	73	21	14	7	21	35	1999–2000 IHL Honorable Mention All-Star
Miller, Kip	(United States)	C	2000–02; 2006–07	203	75	133	208	104	17	5	13	18	14	
Minard, Chris	(Canada)	LW	2010–12	118	39	28	67	70	—	—	—	—	—	2011–12 AHL Fred T. Hunt Memorial Award
Moore, Bryan	(United States)	LW	2018	2	0	0	0	4	—	-	—	-	—	
Mowers, Mark	(United States)	C/RW	2002–04	94	42	53	95	51	15	3	4	7	4	2002–03 AHL Second Team All-Star
Moyer, Russ	(Canada)	D	2007–08	2	0	0	0	0	—	—	—	—	—	
Mueller, Chris *	(United States)	RW	2007–08	2	0	0	0	0	—	—	—	—	—	
Muller, Mike	(United States)	D	1996–97	2	0	0	0	4	—	—	—	—	—	
Murphy, Joe	(Canada)	RW	2001–02	57	8	14	22	24	5	1	0	1	0	
Murphy, Ryan †	(Canada)	D	2021–present	45	10	13	23	26	—	—	—	—	—	
Mursak, Jan *	(Slovenia)	LW	2006–07; 2008–13	213	43	60	103	120	36	11	9	17	28	2013 Calder Cup champion
Myer, Gordi †	(United States)	D	2021–present	8	0	2	2	0	—	-	—	-	—	
Myrvold, Anders	(Norway)	D	2003–04	71	0	21	21	94	4	0	1	1	2	
Nastasiuk, Zach	(Canada)	RW	2013–18	65	4	10	14	4	16	1	1	2	0	
Naumenko, Nick	(United States)	D	2006–07	6	0	3	3	8	—	—	—	—	—	
Nedomansky, Vashi	(Slovakia)	RW	1997–99	19	6	4	10	10	3	0	0	0	0	
Nedomlel, Richard	(Czech Republic)	D	2013–14; 2016	5	0	0	0	22	—	—	—	—	—	
Neil, Chris *	(Canada)	RW	1999–01	129	24	31	55	655	18	2	4	6	46	
Nelson, Jeff	(Canada)	C	1996–97; 2003–04; 2005–06	148	49	87	136	134	9	1	4	5	8	1996–97 IHL Honorable Mention All-Star
Nelson, Todd	(Canada)	D	1996–98; 1999–00; 2001–02	236	11	56	67	123	25	1	2	3	12	1999–2000 IHL Honorable Mention All-Star; 1999–2000 IHL Plus/Minus Award
Nestrasil, Andrej *	(Czech Republic)	RW	2011–14	120	22	24	46	32	11	4	2	6	4	2013 Calder Cup champion
Newbury, Kris	(Canada)	C	2009–10	52	11	22	33	144	—	—	—	—	—	
Newpower, Wyatt †	(United States)	D	2021–present	39	3	5	8	48	—	—	—	—	—	
Nicastro, Max	(United States)	D	2012–13	25	1	2	3	10	—	—	—	—	—	
Nightingale, Jared	(United States)	D	2014–15	2	0	0	0	0	—	—	—	—	—	
Nolan, Tom	(United States)	C	1998–99	6	0	1	1	2	—	—	—	—	—	
Norris, Warren	(Canada)	C	1998–00	7	0	0	0	0	—	—	—	—	—	
Norton, Brad	(United States)	D	2006–07	43	1	4	5	102	7	1	2	3	24	
Nosek, Tomas *	(Czech Republic)	F	2014–17	176	41	64	105	97	40	13	17	30	28	2017 Calder Cup champion
Novak, Travis	(Canada)	F	2013–14	9	1	2	3	6	—	—	—	—	—	
Novotney, Landon	(Canada)	LW	2007–08	2	0	0	0	0	—	—	—	—	—	
Nylander, Michael	(Sweden)	C	2009–10	24	2	16	18	14	—	—	—	—	—	
Nyquist, Gustav *	(Sweden)	RW	2010–13	137	53	90	143	60	10	2	5	7	19	2012–13 AHL First Team All-Star; 2013 Calder Cup champion
O'Leary, Mark	(Canada)	LW	2007–08	16	3	1	4	29	—	—	—	—	—	
Oliver, David	(Canada)	RW	2000–01	51	14	17	31	35	10	6	2	8	8	
Oslund, Nick †	(United States)	RW	2011–12	5	0	1	1	2	—	—	—	—	—	
Ouellet, Xavier *	(Canada)	RW	2013–16	183	9	53	62	112	33	3	7	10	18	
Oulahen, Ryan	(Canada)	LW	2005–09	302	53	54	107	140	23	0	2	2	6	2007–08 Team captain^{[e]}
Owens, Jordan	(Canada)	LW	2009–11	77	7	18	25	123	—	—	—	—	—	
Paetsch, Nathan	(Canada)	D	2012–17	359	21	121	142	170	78	3	27	30	39	2013 Calder Cup champion 2017 Calder Cup champion
Panzer, Jeff	(United States)	C	2004–05	20	6	3	9	11	—	—	—	—	—	
Pare, Francis	(Canada)	C	2008–13	363	102	135	237	138	34	5	11	16	14	2013 Calder Cup champion
Parillo, Nick	(United States)	C	2002–03; 2004–05	5	1	0	1	9	—	—	—	—	—	
Parkes, Trevor	(Canada)	RW	2011–14	116	11	15	26	85	3	1	0	1	2	
Parse, Scott *	(United States)	RW	2006–07	10	2	5	7	6	7	1	0	1	8	
Patterson, Ed	(Canada)	RW	1997–98; 1999–01	225	51	75	126	457	18	7	5	12	27	1999–2001 Team captain
Pavlikovsky, Rastislav	(Slovakia)	LW	1999–01	16	0	5	5	24	—	—	—	—	—	
Pearson, Chase †	(United States)	C	2019–present	134	23	38	61	35	—	—	—	—	—	
Peterson, Brent	(Canada)	LW	1998–99	17	7	5	12	14	—	—	—	—	—	
Peterson, Brett	(United States)	D	2008–09	18	0	1	1	4	1	0	1	1	0	
Petrovicky, Robert	(Slovakia)	C	1998–00	56	31	35	66	91	—	—	—	—	—	
Picard, Michel	(Canada)	LW	1996–00; 2002–04	364	158	222	380	221	41	13	11	24	24	1996–97 IHL First Team All-Star; 1997–98 IHL Honorable Mention All-Star; 1999–2000 IHL Honorable Mention All-Star; 2002–03 AHL Second Team All-Star
Piche, Sebastien	(Canada)	D	2009–12	42	0	5	5	35	—	—	—	—	—	
Pinfold, Dennis	(Canada)	D	1999–00	1	0	0	0	7	—	—	—	—	—	
Plante, Philippe	(Canada)	D	1999–03; 2006–07	125	14	24	38	62	29	2	2	4	14	
Pope, David	(United States)	LW	2018-19	28	2	1	3	12	—	-	—	-	—	
Porter, Kevin	(United States)	C	2014-15	76	16	23	39	25	16	1	3	4	14	
Puempel, Matt	(Canada)	LW	2017-20	165	63	80	143	85	10	3	5	8	16	
Pulkkinen, Teemu *	(Finland)	RW	2013–15	119	65	56	121	66	40	22	12	34	42	2013 Calder Cup champion 2013–14 AHL All-Rookie Team; 2014-15 AHL First All-Star Team; 2014-15 AHL Willie Marshall Award
Pyett, Logan	(Canada)	D	2008–12	288	23	70	93	145	1	0	0	0	0	
Quincey, Kyle *	(Canada)	D	2005–08	201	16	59	75	382	18	0	1	1	27	
Quine, Alan	(Canada)	C	2011–12	3	0	1	1	0	—	—	—	—	—	
Rachunek, Karel *	(Czech Republic)	D	1999–00	62	6	20	26	64	9	0	5	5	6	
Radunske, Brock	(Canada)	LW	2006–07	20	2	0	2	12	—	—	—	—	—	
Raedeke, Brent	(Canada)	LW	2008–09; 2010–13	171	22	21	43	93	—	—	—	—	—	
Ramsay, Bruce	(Canada)	LW	1996–99	175	9	14	23	781	4	0	0	0	2	
Rankin, Evan	(United States)	RW	2010–11	10	1	1	2	7	—	—	—	—	—	
Rasmussen, Michael *	(United States)	C	2019–21	45	11	19	30	26	—	—	—	—	—	
Rechlicz, Joel	(United States)	RW	2015–16	12	0	0	0	35	—	—	—	—	—	
Redenbach, Tyler	(Canada)	C	2007–08	28	3	7	10	10	—	—	—	—	—	
Reid, Shawn	(Canada)	D	1997–98	2	0	0	0	2	—	—	—	—	—	
Remackel, Chad	(United States)	LW	1996–97	70	9	18	27	36	1	0	0	0	0	
Rennette, Tyler	(Canada)	C	2003–04	2	0	0	0	0	—	—	—	—	—	
Renouf, Dan ‡	(Canada)	D	2015-18; 2021-present	183	6	32	38	219	24	2	3	5	25	2017 Calder Cup champion
Richards, Travis	(United States)	D	1996–06	655	56	182	238	502	59	4	21	25	42	2001–04 Team captain 2000–01 IHL Second Team All-Star
Richardson, Bryan	(Canada)	C	2001–02	12	1	3	4	4	—	—	—	—	—	
Rissmiller, Patrick	(United States)	C	2009–10	63	20	25	45	18	—	—	—	—	—	
Ritola, Mattias *	(Sweden)	LW	2007–10	211	41	65	106	144	8	0	2	2	0	
Rivers, Jamie	(Canada)	D	2000–01; 2003–04	4	0	0	0	6	—	—	—	—	—	
Roberts, David	(United States)	LW	2000–01	72	27	36	63	47	10	1	2	3	8	
Robinson, Nathan *	(Canada)	LW/C	2002–05	172	35	56	91	75	11	0	3	3	2	
Robinson, Todd	(Canada)	C	2004–05	40	7	19	26	6	—	—	—	—	—	
Roest, Stacy	(Canada)	C	2002–03	70	24	48	72	28	15	10	6	16	8	
Rogers, Kyle	(United States)	RW	2010–11	1	0	0	0	0	—	—	—	—	—	
Rohlfs, David	(United States)	D	2009–10	5	0	0	0	2	—	—	—	—	—	
Royer, Gaetan *	(Canada)	RW	1998–99	52	12	6	18	177	—	—	—	—	—	
Ruchty, Matt	(Canada)	LW	1996–99	140	23	34	57	682	8	1	3	4	43	
Ruid, J.C.	(United States)	LW	2001–02	3	0	0	0	2	—	—	—	—	—	
Rufenach, Bryan	(Canada)	D	2011–12	13	0	2	2	11	—	—	—	—	—	
Rumble, Darren	(Canada)	D	1998–00	82	9	32	41	64	—	—	—	—	—	
Russo, Robbie *	(United States)	D	2015–18	204	21	82	103	160	33	1	12	13	31	2015–16 AHL All-Rookie Team\Second Team All-Star; 2017 Calder Cup champion
Rybovic, Lubomir	(Slovakia)	LW	1996–97	1	0	0	0	0	—	—	—	—	—	
Ryno, Johan	(Sweden)	LW	2007–08	12	3	4	7	8	—	—	—	—	—	
Saarijarvi, Vili	(Finland)	D	2017–19	125	2	26	28	32	2	1	0	1	0	
Sadowy, Dylan	(Canada)	LW	2016–19	65	5	2	7	36	1	0	0	0	0	
Samuelsson, Mikael	(Sweden)	RW	2013–14	2	0	0	0	0	—	—	—	—	—	
Sarault, Yves	(Canada)	LW	1999–00	62	17	26	43	77	17	7	4	11	32	
Sasseville, Francois	(Canada)	C	1998–99	3	0	0	0	2	—	—	—	—	—	
Schastlivy, Petr *	(Russia)	LW	1999–02	120	48	39	87	30	24	12	11	23	6	1999–2000 IHL Honorable Mention All-Star
Schneekloth, Aaron	(Canada)	D	2002–04	58	1	7	8	14	—	—	—	—	—	
Sebrango, Donovan †	(Canada)	D	2021–present	74	1	9	10	35	—	—	—	—	—	
Seider, Moritz *	(Germany)	D	2019–20	49	2	20	22	28	—	—	—	—	—	
Shafronov, Konstantin	(Kazakhstan)	RW	1999–00	24	3	8	11	15	—	—	—	—	—	
Shannon, Darrin	(Canada)	LW	1998–99	10	1	5	6	12	—	—	—	—	—	
Sheahan, Riley *	(Canada)	C	2011–14	110	25	31	56	45	32	4	17	21	10	2013 Calder Cup champion
Shevalier, Jeff	(Canada)	LW	1999–00	2	0	0	0	0	—	—	—	—	—	
Shine, Dominik †	(United States)	RW	2017–present	262	26	37	63	310	10	1	1	2	4	
Shockey, Jonathon	(Canada)	D	2001–02	6	0	1	1	7	—	—	—	—	—	
Simon, Ben	(United States)	LW	2006–07	21	4	5	9	28	7	0	0	0	9	
Simon, Darcy	(Canada)	D	1996–98	84	5	15	20	383	5	1	1	2	35	
Skarperud, Tim	(United States)	RW	2001–04	96	20	19	39	33	11	2	2	4	0	
Skinner, Brett	(Canada)	D	2012–13	33	4	13	17	12	21	0	6	6	12	2013 Calder Cup champion
Sloan, Blake	(United States)	RW	2003–05	85	19	13	32	72	—	—	—	—	—	2004–05 Team captain
Smith, Adam	(Canada)	D	1998–99	5	0	0	0	12	—	—	—	—	—	
Smith, Brendan *	(Canada)	D	2010–13	108	22	44	66	214	—	—	—	—	—	
Smith, Dan	(Canada)	D	2006–07	80	1	10	11	97	7	0	1	1	8	
Smith, Darin	(Canada)	LW	1996–97	14	2	1	3	23	—	—	—	—	—	
Smith, Gemel †	(Canada)	C	2022	3	0	1	1	8	—	-	—	-	—	
Smith, Givani *	(Canada)	LW	2017–21	129	24	23	47	217	4	0	2	2	9	
Solari, Kelvin	(Canada)	LW	1996–97	1	0	0	0	2	—	—	—	—	—	
Spezia, Tyler †	(United States)	C	2018–present	104	21	21	42	45	—	—	—	—	—	
Spezza, Jason *	(Canada)	C	2001–02	—	—	—	—	—	3	1	0	1	2	
Spink, Tylor	(Canada)	C	2017	1	0	0	0	0	—	—	—	—	—	
Spiridonov, Maxim	(Russia)	RW	1997–99	41	11	17	28	12	3	0	0	0	0	
Sproul, Ryan *	(Canada)	D	2012–16; 2017	220	29	66	95	101	24	4	10	14	12	2013–14 AHL All-Rookie Team
Sryubko, Andrei	(Ukraine)	D	1999–00	28	0	1	1	109	2	0	0	0	9	
Stafford, Garrett	(United States)	D	2007–09	139	22	67	89	86	10	0	5	5	4	2007–08 Team captain^{[e]}
Stewart, Bobby	(Canada)	C	2000–01	7	0	2	2	0	—	—	—	—	—	
Stewart, Mackenze	(Canada)	D	2018	4	0	0	0	0	—	—	—	—	—	
Stokes, Ryan	(Canada)	D	2009–10	7	0	1	1	11	—	—	—	—	—	
Straub, Brandon	(Canada)	D	2010–11	53	3	2	5	147	—	—	—	—	—	
Street, Ben	(Canada)	C	2016–18	135	46	74	120	38	24	12	17	29	8	2017 Calder Cup champion
Sulak, Libor	(Czech Republic)	D	2018–19	63	5	11	16	42	4	0	2	2	4	
Sullivan, Brian	(United States)	RW	1997–98	54	12	7	19	49	—	—	—	—	—	
Svechnikov, Evgeny *	(Russia)	RW	2016–21	186	39	62	101	183	26	6	8	14	24	2017 Calder Cup champion
Sweetman, Eric	(United States)	D	2019	2	0	0	0	0	—	—	—	—	—	
Syvret, Danny	(Canada)	D	2006–07	57	4	16	20	16	—	—	—	—	—	
Szysky, Chris	(Canada)	RW	1998–02	150	25	24	49	242	27	2	6	8	72	
Tallaire, Sean	(Canada)	RW	1997–99	77	13	17	30	65	—	—	—	—	—	
Tangradi, Eric	(United States)	D	2015–18; 2019-20	221	85	92	177	182	30	6	22	28	20	2015–16 AHL All-Rookie Team\Second Team All-Star; 2017 Calder Cup champion
Tansey, Kevin	(Canada)	D	2019	4	0	0	0	2	—	-	—	-	—	
Tardif, Jamie	(Canada)	RW	2006–11	316	78	76	154	322	12	2	0	2	8	2009–11 Team captain
Tatar, Tomas *	(Slovakia)	LW	2009–13	204	64	83	147	71	24	16	5	21	23	2013 Calder Cup champion, 2013 Finals MVP
Terry, Chris	(Canada)	F	2018-20	126	50	62	112	70	5	1	1	2	2	
Thomas, Mike	(Canada)	LW	2011–12	9	0	1	1	15	—	—	—	—	—	
Tollefsen, Ole-Kristian	(Norway)	D	2009–10	16	1	0	1	44	—	—	—	—	—	
Tootoo, Jordin †	(Canada)	RW	2013–14	51	6	12	18	104	4	0	1	1	4	
Torquato, Zack	(Canada)	C	2007–09	12	1	0	1	8	—	—	—	—	—	
Traverse, Patrick	(Canada)	D	1996–97	10	2	1	3	10	2	0	1	1	2	
Trboyevich, Dean	(United States)	D	1996–98	96	3	6	9	167	5	0	1	1	14	
Tremblay, J.F.	(Canada)	D	2000–01	2	0	0	0	0	—	—	—	—	—	
Tucker, Travis	(United States)	D	1997–99	12	0	0	0	38	—	—	—	—	—	
Turgeon, Dominic *	(Canada)	C	2016–21	306	42	64	106	81	22	2	3	5	2	2017 Calder Cup champion
Tvrdon, Marek	(Slovakia)	LW	2013–16	53	10	19	29	16	13	2	4	6	2	
Tyutyayev, Kirill †	(Russia)	LW	2021-present	9	0	3	3	4	—	-	—	-	—	
Ulmer, Jeff	(Canada)	RW	2001–02	73	9	17	26	65	5	0	1	1	11	
Vandermeer, Pete *	(Canada)	LW	2004–05	73	4	13	17	310	—	—	—	—	—	
Van Drunen, Dave *	(Canada)	D	1999–04	280	9	30	39	366	35	0	2	2	58	
Vasilevsky, Alex	(Ukraine)	RW	1996–97	10	1	5	6	43	5	0	1	1	19	
Vasilyev, Andrei	(Russia)	LW	1998–99	59	21	27	48	24	—	—	—	—	—	
Vauclair, Julien *	(Switzerland)	D	2001–02	71	5	14	19	18	4	0	1	1	4	
Veleno, Joe ‡	(Canada)	F	2019–22	69	18	18	36	26	—	—	—	—	—	
Verbeek, Hayden †	(Canada)	LW	2019–present	25	2	3	5	6	—	—	—	—	—	
Vigilante, John	(United States)	F	2009–10	79	11	14	25	31	—	—	—	—	—	
Vilneff, Mark	(Canada)	D	1997–98	5	0	0	0	0	—	—	—	—	—	
Virtue, Terry	(Canada)	D	2005–06	12	1	1	2	33	16	0	8	8	42	
Voce, Tony	(United States)	LW	2006–07	25	4	6	10	37	7	3	2	5	6	
Wallace, Buddy	(United States)	C	1999–00	4	0	1	1	4	—	—	—	—	—	
Walsh, Mike	(United States)	LW	2006–10	47	6	1	7	17	5	0	4	4	0	
Watt, Mike	(Canada)	LW	2006–07	1	0	0	0	0	—	—	—	—	—	
Weiss, Stephen †	(Canada)	C	2015	3	2	0	2	0	—	—	—	—	—	
Weaver, Jason	(Canada)	LW	1997–99	54	4	6	10	84	2	0	1	1	0	
White, Todd	(Canada)	C	2000–01	64	22	32	54	20	10	4	4	8	10	2000–01 IHL Honorable Mention All-Star
Whitecotton, Dustin	(Canada)	C	2001–03	10	1	0	1	10	1	0	0	0	0	
Williams, Jason	(Canada)	C	2002–03	45	23	22	45	18	15	1	7	8	16	
Williams, Jeremy	(Canada)	RW	2009–10	77	32	31	63	55	—	—	—	—	—	
Wilson, Clay *	(United States)	D	2005–06	60	10	27	37	40	16	0	3	3	8	
Wilson, Landon	(United States)	RW	2008–09	15	8	7	15	37	—	—	—	—	—	
Witkowski, Luke †	(United States)	D	2021–present	39	3	4	7	53	—	—	—	—	—	
Wong, Brandon	(Canada)	F	2009–10	3	0	1	1	0	—	—	—	—	—	
Wood, Derek	(Canada)	C	2000–01	6	1	1	2	2	—	—	—	—	—	
Wood, Kyle	(Canada)	D	2019–20	35	1	5	6	8	—	—	—	—	—	
Yan, Dennis †	(United States)	LW	2021–present	34	7	4	11	21	—	—	—	—	—	
Yates, Trevor	(Germany)	C	2018–19	4	0	1	1	0	—	—	—	—	—	
Yule, Steve	(Canada)	D	1996–97	3	0	1	1	9	—	—	—	—	—	
Zadina, Filip *	(Canada)	LW	2018–20	80	25	26	51	26	5	2	1	3	0	
Zengerle, Eric	(United States)	RW	2014–16	144	24	60	84	42	24	2	13	15	4	

== Notes ==
- ^{a} This total does not include Chris Chelios, Jody Hull, Curtis Joseph, Manny Legace, Andreas Lilja and Chris Osgood, who returned to the NHL following conditioning stints in Grand Rapids.
- ^{b} The seasons column lists the first year of the season of the player's first game and the last year of the season of the player's last game. For example, a player who played one game in the 1996–97 IHL season would be listed as playing with the team from 1996 to 1997, regardless of what calendar year the game occurred within.
- ^{c} During the Griffins' existence, ties were not an attainable outcome in the IHL and were only attainable in the AHL until the 2004–05 season.
- ^{d} "Overtime losses" encompasses all point-earning losses that occur after regulation play, including overtime losses proper and shootout losses.
- ^{e} During the 2007–08 season, the Griffins rotated the captaincy among Mark Cullen, Ryan Oulahen and Garrett Stafford on a five-game basis.
