= Joey MacDonald =

Canadian ice hockey player (born 1980)

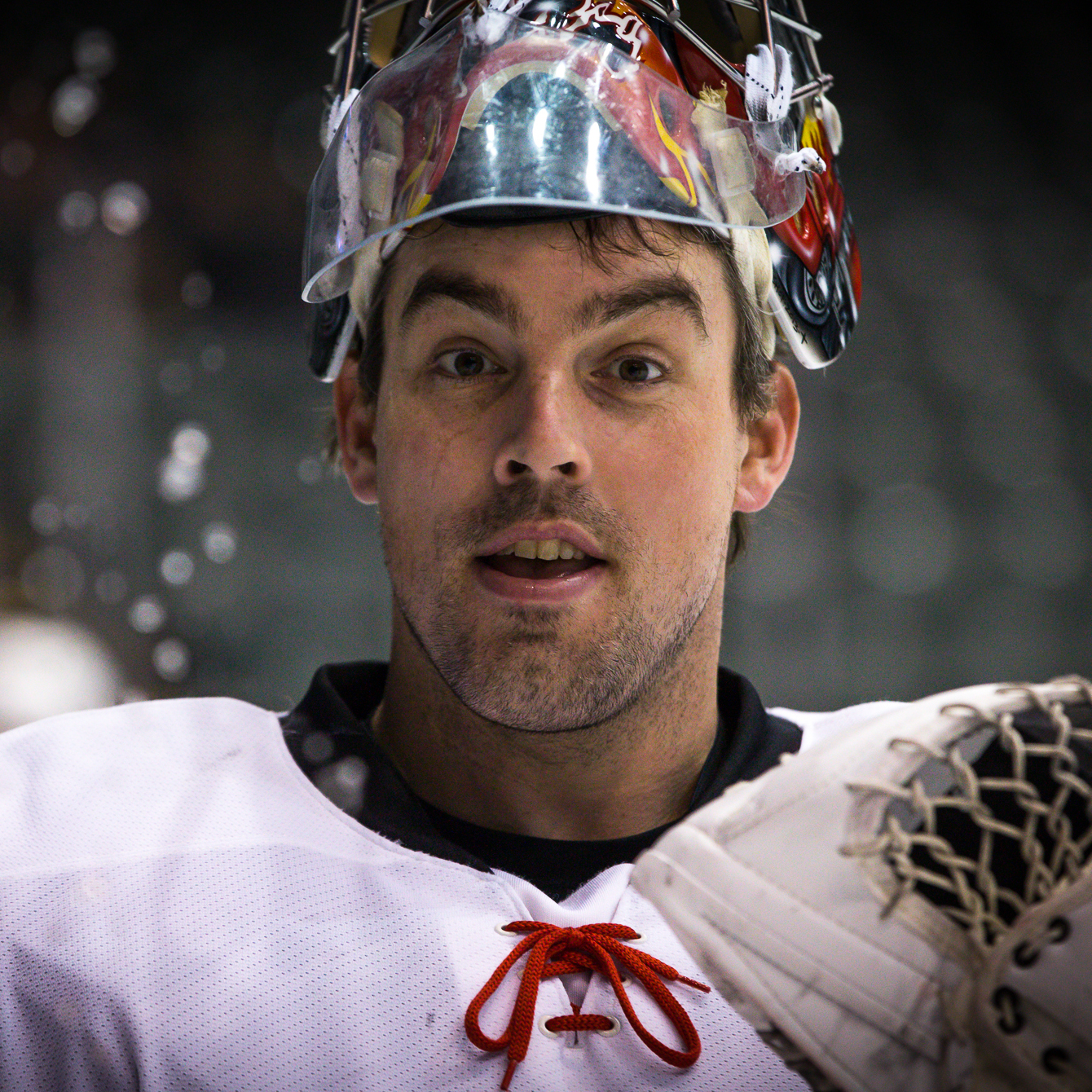
- MacDonald with the Abbotsford Heat in January 2014
- Born: February 7, 1980 (age 46) Pictou, Nova Scotia, Canada
- Height: 6 ft 0 in (183 cm)
- Weight: 197 lb (89 kg; 14 st 1 lb)
- Position: Goaltender
- Caught: Left
- Played for: Detroit Red Wings; Boston Bruins; New York Islanders; Toronto Maple Leafs; Calgary Flames; Schwenninger Wild Wings
- Playing career: 2001–2017

Joseph Leonard MacDonald (born February 7, 1980) is a Canadian former professional ice hockey goaltender. He previously played in the National Hockey League (NHL) with the Detroit Red Wings, Boston Bruins, New York Islanders, Toronto Maple Leafs, and the Calgary Flames.

== Playing career ==
=== Junior ===
MacDonald began his junior hockey career in the Quebec Major Junior Hockey League for the 1997–98 season playing for the Halifax Mooseheads. In 17 games, he recorded only three wins, but continued to work on his style and play, impressing the coaching staff in the process. The Ontario Hockey League then came calling the following season and MacDonald began play for the Peterborough Petes as their starting goaltender. MacDonald thrived in his expanded role, finishing with a winning record and a lower goals against average. He remained the Pete's starting goaltender until the 2001–02 season when he joined the Toledo Storm of the ECHL after signing with the Detroit Red Wings as a free agent.

=== Professional ===
MacDonald struggled on the weak ECHL team and recorded only 12 wins in his 38 games. The Red Wings sent MacDonald to the Grand Rapids Griffins of the AHL for the 2002–03 AHL season as backup to Marc Lamothe. MacDonald proved to be capable in his new role, finishing with 14 wins and 6 losses in the 25 games he played. The 2003–04 AHL season saw MacDonald splitting time with Lamothe. The Griffins had seen enough and after Lamothe left the following season, MacDonald was named starting goaltender. MacDonald played in 66 games for the Griffins, finishing with a record of 34–29–2 and a save percentage of .926. The 2005–06 AHL season saw an influx of goaltenders into the Red Wings farm system and MacDonald competed to stay near the top. He split time with Drew MacIntyre and new prospect Jimmy Howard. MacDonald finished the season 17–9–2 in 32 games played.

MacDonald was brought up to the NHL for the 2006–07 season when he was named as a backup goaltender to Dominik Hašek and Chris Osgood of the Detroit Red Wings. MacDonald made his NHL debut on October 19, 2006 against the San Jose Sharks. Detroit was down 3–0 when MacDonald came in for Osgood after he let in three power play goals in the first 15 minutes of period one. However, it would take five more games, in which he was the starting goaltender, before MacDonald would get his first NHL win with a 7–4 victory over the Calgary Flames on February 11, 2007.

On February 24, 2007, the Boston Bruins picked up MacDonald on waivers. He played his first game with the Bruins on March 4, 2007 resulting in a 4–1 win over the New Jersey Devils.

On July 8, 2007, MacDonald signed a two-year deal as an unrestricted free agent with the New York Islanders. He was then assigned to affiliate, the Bridgeport Sound Tigers of the AHL.

In the 2008–09 season, MacDonald became the Islanders regular backup goalie. This is due to the departure of the team's previous backup, Wade Dubielewicz, as an UFA and his subsequent signing in Russia. This also had to do with the second year of MacDonald's contract being a one-way deal. Many Islanders fans were apprehensive about this arrangement, feeling that MacDonald may not be ready to be DiPietro's backup on a regular basis- especially since they hoped their starting netminder was going to get more time to rest. That time to rest came earlier than expected as DiPietro started the season recovering from an injury and then went out once again to another injury after two losses. MacDonald finished the season with a 14-26-6 record, to go along with a 3.37 goals against average. A high point of his season was a 2–0 victory against his former team, the Detroit Red Wings at Joe Louis Arena. MacDonald made 42 saves while recording his first career shutout in the NHL.

On August 10, 2009, MacDonald was signed to a one-year contract by the Toronto Maple Leafs. Prior to the 2009–10 season, MacDonald was placed on waivers and was assigned the starting goaltender for the Toronto Marlies of the AHL, on September 29, 2009. On October 8, 2009, MacDonald was called up to the Maple Leafs to back up Vesa Toskala. He would later get his first ever start with the Maple Leafs on October 13, 2009.

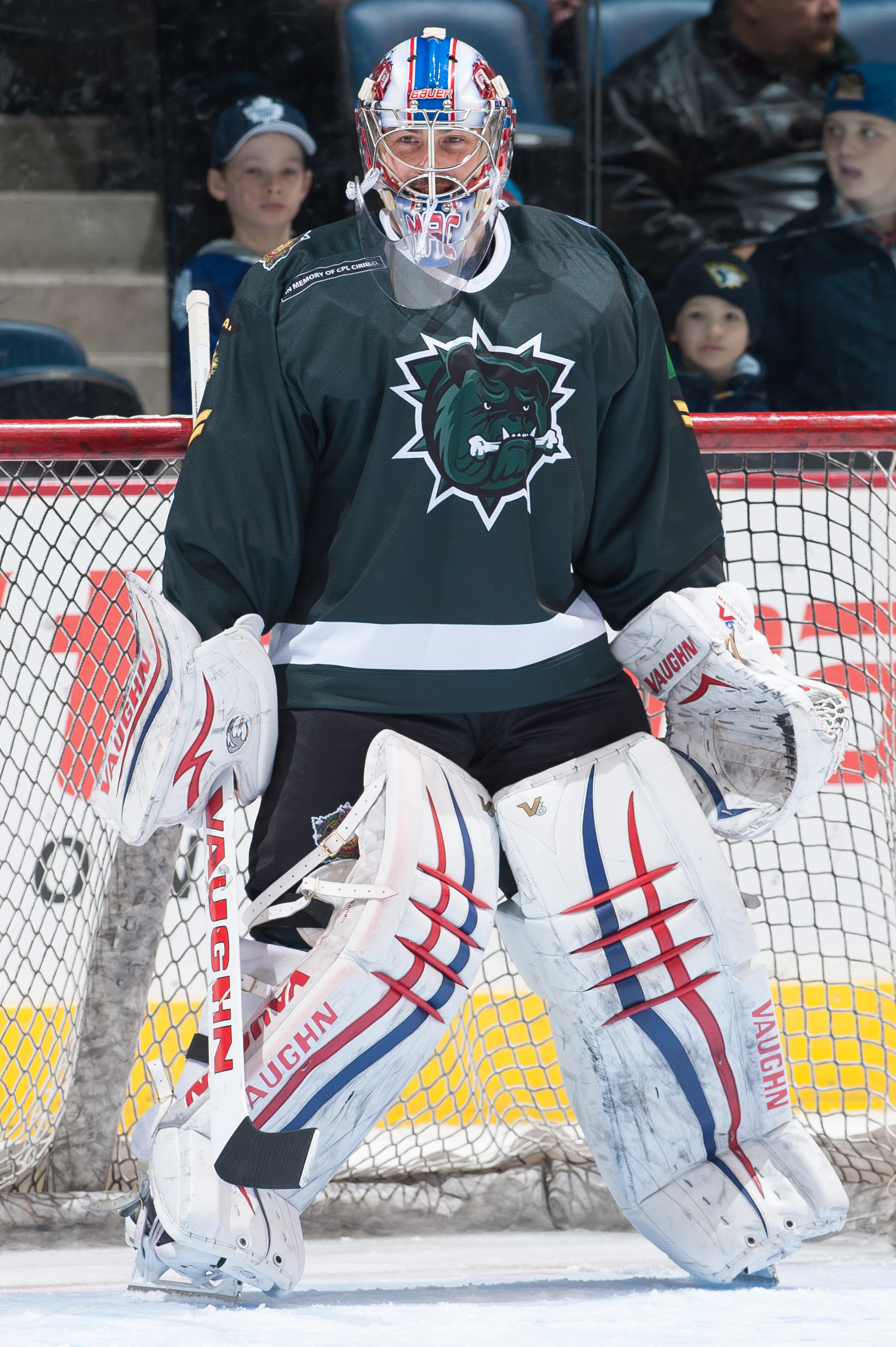
MacDonald with the Hamilton Bulldogs in 2014

On March 3, 2010, MacDonald was traded by the Leafs to the Anaheim Ducks for a seventh round pick. As the Ducks had no AHL affiliate team at the time, MacDonald remained with the Marlies after the trade.

On July 2, 2010, MacDonald returned to Detroit when he signed a one-year two-way contract with the organization. He recorded a 5-5-3 record in 15 appearances with Detroit, including one shutout. He remained with the Red Wings for the final months of the regular season and playoffs as Jimmy Howard's backup due to an injury to Chris Osgood.

MacDonald signed a two-year contract on July 11, 2011 with the Red Wings (a two-way deal in the first year and a one-way deal in the second year) over an offer to play in the KHL with Lokomotiv Yaroslavl. MacDonald began the season with the Griffins as the organization's number three goaltender. Following an injury to starter Jimmy Howard and the unsteady play of back-up Ty Conklin, MacDonald was recalled to the Red Wings where he has helped extend the Red Wings NHL-record home winning streak.

MacDonald was put on waivers by the Red Wings on February 10, 2013. He was then claimed off waivers by the Calgary Flames the following day. He was their backup goaltender behind Karri Ramo

MacDonald was signed as a free agent on July 1, 2014 by the Montreal Canadiens to a one-year two-way contract. MacDonald failed to make the Canadiens out of training camp and, after clearing waivers, was assigned to their AHL affiliate, the Hamilton Bulldogs.

He signed a one-year contract with the Schwenninger Wild Wings of the Deutsche Eishockey Liga on June 19, 2015 and had his contract renewed for a second year in March 2016. In 2017, he was let go.

== Awards ==
AHL

- Harry "Hap" Holmes Memorial Award (2003)
- AHL All Star Game (2004)

== Records ==
- Team record: Highest save percentage in a season: .936 (Grand Rapids Griffins 2003–04)
- Team record: Most career goaltending wins: 70 (Grand Rapids Griffins)
- Team record: Most career shutouts: 14 (Grand Rapids Griffins)

== Career statistics ==
=== Regular season and playoffs ===
			Regular season										Playoffs
Season	Team	League	GP	W	L	T	OTL	MIN	GA	SO	GAA	SV%	GP	W	L	MIN	GA	SO	GAA	SV%
1997–98	Halifax Mooseheads	QMJHL	17	3	12	0	—	816	54	0	3.97	.880	3	1	2	140	15	0	6.43	—
1998–99	Peterborough Petes	OHL	47	22	15	2	—	2,483	123	3	2.97	.911	3	0	2	145	13	0	5.34	.871
1999–00	Peterborough Petes	OHL	48	20	15	6	—	2,641	125	2	2.84	.911	5	1	4	280	16	1	3.43	.895
2000–01	Peterborough Petes	OHL	57	25	21	7	—	3,284	161	1	2.94	.910	7	3	4	425	18	0	2.54	.935
2001–02	Toledo Storm	ECHL	39	12	15	7	—	2,084	100	1	2.88	.922	—	—	—	—	—	—	—	—
2001–02	Cincinnati Mighty Ducks	AHL	—	—	—	—	—	—	—	—	—	—	1	0	1	84	3	0	2.14	.939
2002–03	Grand Rapids Griffins	AHL	25	14	6	0	—	1,336	49	3	2.20	.916	1	0	0	8	1	0	7.95	.750
2003–04	Grand Rapids Griffins	AHL	39	22	12	3	—	2,249	74	6	1.97	.936	1	0	1	40	4	0	6.04	.826
2004–05	Grand Rapids Griffins	AHL	66	34	29	2	—	3,754	143	5	2.29	.926	—	—	—	—	—	—	—	—
2005–06	Grand Rapids Griffins	AHL	32	17	9	—	2	1,745	91	2	3.13	.897	—	—	—	—	—	—	—	—
2005–06	Toledo Storm	ECHL	1	1	0	—	0	60	1	0	1.00	.962	—	—	—	—	—	—	—	—
2006–07	Detroit Red Wings	NHL	8	1	5	—	1	468	27	0	3.46	.872	—	—	—	—	—	—	—	—
2006–07	Grand Rapids Griffins	AHL	2	1	1	—	0	123	6	0	2.93	.898	—	—	—	—	—	—	—	—
2006–07	Boston Bruins	NHL	7	2	2	—	1	358	16	0	2.68	.918	—	—	—	—	—	—	—	—
2007–08	Bridgeport Sound Tigers	AHL	38	16	19	—	2	2,266	109	2	2.89	.909	—	—	—	—	—	—	—	—
2007–08	New York Islanders	NHL	2	0	1	—	1	120	6	0	3.00	.918	—	—	—	—	—	—	—	—
2008–09	New York Islanders	NHL	49	14	26	—	6	2,792	157	1	3.37	.901	—	—	—	—	—	—	—	—
2009–10	Toronto Marlies	AHL	36	14	19	—	3	2,112	112	2	3.18	.893	—	—	—	—	—	—	—	—
2009–10	Toronto Maple Leafs	NHL	6	1	4	—	0	319	17	0	3.20	.892	—	—	—	—	—	—	—	—
2010–11	Grand Rapids Griffins	AHL	20	10	9	—	1	1164	54	1	2.78	.894	—	—	—	—	—	—	—	—
2010–11	Detroit Red Wings	NHL	15	5	5	—	3	721	31	1	2.58	.917	—	—	—	—	—	—	—	—
2011–12	Grand Rapids Griffins	AHL	26	11	11	—	3	1412	62	3	2.63	.913	—	—	—	—	—	—	—	—
2011–12	Detroit Red Wings	NHL	14	8	5	—	1	806	29	0	2.16	.912	—	—	—	—	—	—	—	—
2012–13	Calgary Flames	NHL	21	8	9	—	1	1148	55	0	2.87	.902	—	—	—	—	—	—	—	—
2013–14	Calgary Flames	NHL	11	5	4	—	1	599	29	0	2.90	.890	—	—	—	—	—	—	—	—
2013–14	Abbotsford Heat	AHL	16	5	10	—	0	900	45	0	3.00	.909	—	—	—	—	—	—	—	—
2014–15	Hamilton Bulldogs	AHL	26	10	9	—	6	1558	72	0	2.77	.910	—	—	—	—	—	—	—	—
2015–16	Schwenninger Wild Wings	DEL	28	10	17	—	0	1605	85	0	3.18	.919	—	—	—	—	—	—	—	—
2016–17	Schwenninger Wild Wings	DEL	17	4	12	—	0	948	44	0	2.78	.915	—	—	—	—	—	—	—	—
NHL totals			133	44	61	—	15	7,331	367	2	3.00	.902	—	—	—	—	—	—	—	—

Awards and achievements
Preceded by Mathieu Chouinard, Simon Lajeunesse and Martin Prusek	Winner of the Hap Holmes Memorial Award (with Marc Lamothe); 2002–2003	Succeeded by Wade Dubielewicz and Dieter Kochan
