= Martin Prusek =

Czech ice hockey coach and player

- Born: December 11, 1975 (age 50) Ostrava, Czechoslovakia
- Height: 6 ft 1 in (185 cm)
- Weight: 171 lb (78 kg; 12 st 3 lb)
- Position: Goaltender
- Caught: Left
- Played for: HC Vitkovice; Ottawa Senators; HC Znojemsti Orli; Columbus Blue Jackets; SKA Saint Petersburg; HC Spartak Moscow; Dinamo Riga; HC Olomouc
- National team: Czech Republic
- NHL draft: 164th overall, 1999; Ottawa Senators
- Playing career: 1994–2011

Martin Prusek (born December 11, 1975) is a Czech ice hockey coach and former professional ice hockey goaltender. During his playing career, Prusek appeared in 57 games in the National Hockey League (NHL) with the Ottawa Senators and Columbus Blue Jackets. Prusek currently serves as the goaltending coach for HC Vítkovice Steel of the Czech Extraliga.

== Playing career ==
Martin Prusek started his professional ice hockey career in 1994 when he joined HC Vitkovice of the Czech Extraliga. After playing there for five seasons, Prusek was drafted by the Ottawa Senators in the sixth round of the 1999 NHL entry draft with the 164th overall pick. He signed a multi-year contract with Ottawa in 2001 and made his North American debut with the Grand Rapids Griffins of the American Hockey League during the 2001–02 season. He also made his NHL debut that same season, appearing in one game with the Senators.

Prusek appeared in 47 games with the Senators over the following two seasons, compiling a record of 28–8–4. During the 2004–05 NHL lockout, he returned to the Czech Republic to play for Vitkovice and HC JME Znojemští Orli. He came back to North America for the 2005–06 season, joining the Columbus Blue Jackets. After spending most of the 2005–06 season with the Blue Jackets AHL affiliate Syracuse Crunch, Prusek left North America and joined SKA Saint Petersburg in the Russian Super League. During 2007–08, he rejoined HC Vitkovice in the Czech Extraliga. In 2008-09 Prusek played in Kontinental Hockey League and after a brief contract with HC Spartak Moscow, he joined Dinamo Riga for 2 seasons. After the 2009-10 season, Prusek once again rejoined HC Vítkovice Steel. Although he suffered from carditis and played just in 2 Extraliga games during all the 2010-11 season, he reached a silver medal.

In summer 2011, he stepped into HC Vítkovice Steel pre-season players' camp, but on July 26 he announced his retirement decision and also he accepted the club's offer for the position of goaltender coach.

== Career statistics ==
=== Regular season and playoffs ===
			Regular season										Playoffs
Season	Team	League	GP	W	L	T	OTL	MIN	GA	SO	GAA	SV%	GP	W	L	MIN	GA	SO	GAA	SV%
1995–96	HC Vítkovice	ELH	40	—	—	—	—	2336	113	1	2.90	.911	4	—	—	250	10	1	2.40	.935
1996–97	HC Vítkovice	ELH	49	—	—	—	—	2841	109	8	2.30	.921	9	—	—	546	19	1	2.09	.935
1997–98	HC Vítkovice	ELH	50	—	—	—	—	2901	129	0	2.67	.948	9	—	—	529	26	1	2.95	.910
1998–99	HC Vítkovice	ELH	37	—	—	—	—	1905	85	0	2.68	.917	4	—	—	250	12	0	2.88	.923
1999–00	HC Vítkovice	ELH	50	—	—	—	—	2647	132	0	2.99	.911	—	—	—	—	—	—	—	—
2000–01	HC Vítkovice	ELH	30	—	—	—	—	1679	64	0	2.29	.924	9	—	—	460	25	0	3.26	.919
2001–02	Grand Rapids Griffins	AHL	33	18	8	5	—	1903	58	4	1.83	.930	5	2	3	278	10	0	2.16	.896
2001–02	Ottawa Senators	NHL	1	0	1	0	—	62	3	0	2.90	.800	—	—	—	—	—	—	—	—
2002–03	Ottawa Senators	NHL	18	12	2	1	—	935	37	0	2.37	.911	—	—	—	—	—	—	—	—
2002–03	Binghamton Senators	AHL	4	1	2	1	—	243	7	1	1.73	.925	—	—	—	—	—	—	—	—
2003–04	Ottawa Senators	NHL	29	16	6	3	—	1528	54	3	2.12	.917	1	0	0	40	1	0	1.50	.933
2004–05	HC Vítkovice	ELH	14	—	—	—	—	672	28	0	2.50	.931	—	—	—	—	—	—	—	—
2004–05	HC Znojemsti Orli Znojmo	ELH	8	—	—	—	—	453	18	0	2.38	.932	—	—	—	—	—	—	—	—
2005–06	Syracuse Crunch	AHL	23	12	7	—	1	1203	60	2	2.99	.911	—	—	—	—	—	—	—	—
2005-06	Columbus Blue Jackets	NHL	9	3	3	—	0	373	20	0	3.22	.879	—	—	—	—	—	—	—	—
2006–07	SKA St. Petersburg	RSL	22	—	—	—	—	1161	52	3	2.69	—	—	—	—	—	—	—	—	—
2007–08	HC Vítkovice	ELH	43	17	26	—	0	2366	106	3	2.69	.932	—	—	—	—	—	—	—	—
2008–09	Spartak Moscow	KHL	22	8	9	—	4	1280	64	2	3.00	.879	—	—	—	—	—	—	—	—
2008–09	Dynamo Riga	KHL	20	10	6	—	2	1164	33	6	1.70	.941	3	0	3	167	13	0	4.67	.859
2009–10	Dynamo Riga	KHL	28	7	15	—	2	1477	77	0	3.13	.903	4	1	3	210	9	0	2.57	.921
2010–11	HC Vítkovice	ELH	2	—	—	—	—	106	4	0	2.26	.923	—	—	—	—	—	—	—	—
NHL totals			57	31	12	4	0	2898	114	3	2.36	.909	1	0	0	40	1	0	1.50	.933

== Awards ==
- Hap Holmes Memorial Award (lowest GAA in AHL): 2001–02 season (with Mathieu Chouinard and Simon Lajeunesse)

== International achievements ==
Martin Prusek's first international team game was the game against Russia on 17 December 1995, in Moscow.

	Year	Total
Ice Hockey World Championships	WC 1997 (bronze); WC 1998 (bronze); WC 1999 (gold); WC 2009 6th place	4x

Awards and achievements
Preceded by Tom Askey and Mika Noronen	Winner of the Hap Holmes Memorial Award (with Mathieu Chouinard and Simon Lajeunesse); 2001–2002	Succeeded by Marc Lamothe and Joey MacDonald
Preceded by Dwayne Roloson	Aldege "Baz" Bastien Memorial Award; 2001–02	Succeeded by Marc Lamothe
