= Marc Lamothe =

Canadian ice hockey player

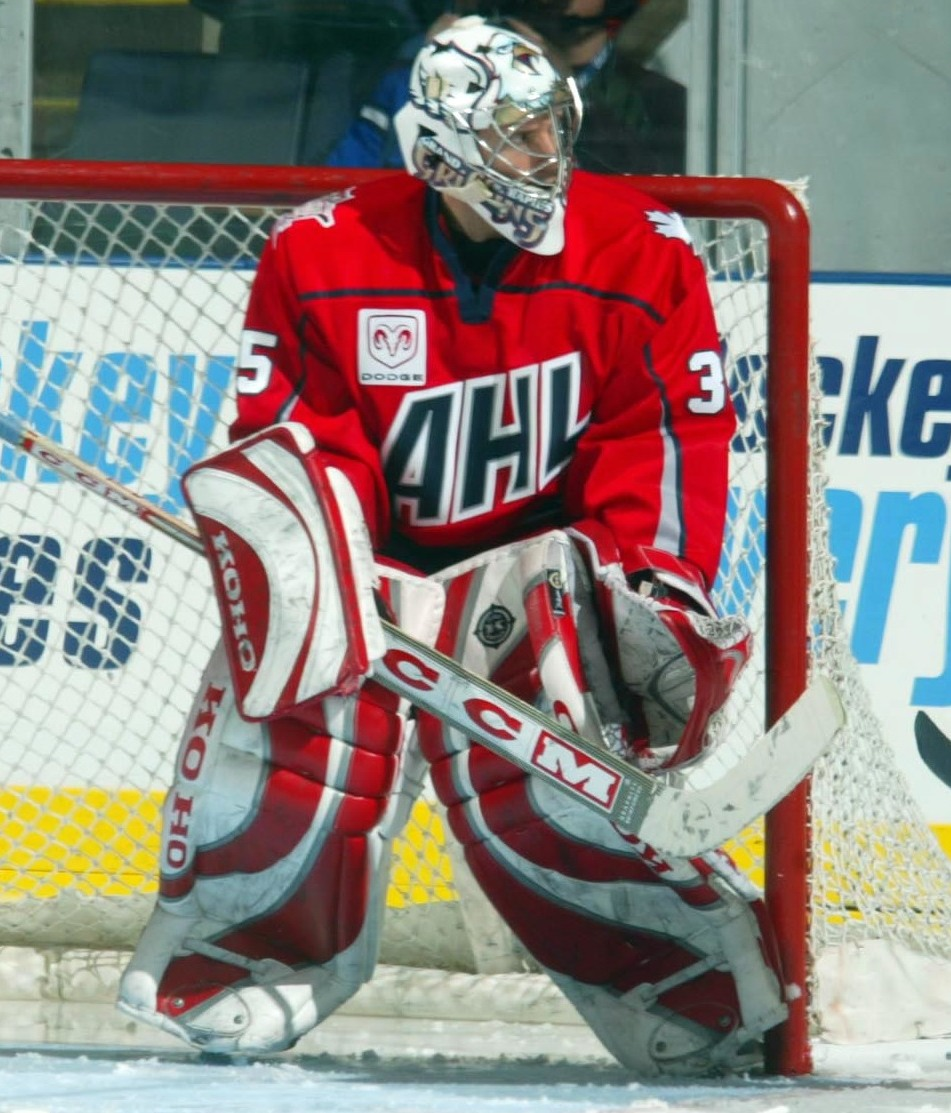
- Lamothe in 2003
- Born: February 27, 1974 (age 52) New Liskeard, Ontario, Canada
- Height: 6 ft 2 in (188 cm)
- Weight: 214 lb (97 kg; 15 st 4 lb)
- Position: Goalie
- Caught: Left
- Played for: Chicago Blackhawks; Detroit Red Wings; Lokomotiv Yaroslavl; Severstal Cherepovets; SKA St. Petersburg; Barys Astana; Pelicans; Hamburg Freezers
- NHL draft: 92nd overall, 1992; Montreal Canadiens
- Playing career: 1994–2011

Marc Lamothe (born February 27, 1974) is a Canadian former professional ice hockey goaltender. He last played in the Deutsche Eishockey Liga for Hamburg Freezers during the 2010–11 season.

== Playing career ==
=== Montreal Canadiens ===
Lamothe began his Junior hockey career with the Kingston Frontenacs before being drafted by the National Hockey League's Montreal Canadiens, 92nd Overall, in the 1992 NHL entry draft. When he turned pro in the 1994–95 season, the Canadiens assigned Patrick Labrecque and Martin Brochu to their top minor league affiliate, the Fredericton Canadiens of the AHL, leaving Lamothe to spend the majority of his rookie season with the Wheeling Thunderbirds of the ECHL. Despite this, Lamothe did play in 9 contests for the Fredericton Canadiens that year. During the 1995–96 season, Montreal gave him a spot on their AHL team. However, he did not see much action aside from 23 appearances. By season's end, it was clear he was not going to factor into the Canadiens plans and was subsequently released to free agency.

=== Chicago Blackhawks ===
The Chicago Blackhawks signed Lamothe to a contract on 21 August 1996. Lamothe spent the next three seasons with Chicago's top minor league affiliate, the Indianapolis Ice of the IHL. With Indianapolis, Lamothe honed his game while waiting for his chance to be called up to the NHL. At the start of the 1999–2000 season, Lamothe left Indianapolis to play for the Cleveland Lumberjacks, though his rights were still maintained by Chicago. Early in the 1999–2000 campaign, Lamothe got the call from the Blackhawks who needed him to suit up as Jocelyn Thibault's back up as in injury fill in for Steve Passmore.

Just four minutes into the game, Thibault went down with an injury and Lamothe made his NHL debut. The St. Louis Blues, however, were merciless, scoring seven times en route to an 8–3 victory. He was able turn things around after this tough first game a week later, when he stopped 22 of 25 shots against the Boston Bruins and posted his first NHL victory.

=== Columbus Blue Jackets ===
Following the 1999–2000 season, Lamothe signed an AHL deal with the Columbus Blue Jackets on September 1, 2000. Lamothe spent the entire year in the minors, playing for the Syracuse Crunch of the AHL.

=== Edmonton Oilers ===
After a year with Columbus, Lamothe signed an AHL contract with the Edmonton Oilers organization, for the 2001–02 season. Despite having a strong showing in training camp, the Oilers elected to go with Jussi Markkanen to back up Tommy Salo, leaving Lamothe to play the entire season with Hamilton.

=== Detroit Red Wings ===
The Detroit Red Wings signed Lamothe on August 5, 2002, to a one-year contract. Upon his arrival with the organization, he was assigned to the club's AHL affiliate, the Grand Rapids Griffins, to act as a mentor for the developing goaltender Joey MacDonald. Lamothe had a strong season in the AHL that year, winning the Aldege "Baz" Bastien Memorial Award for being the AHL's best goaltender and sharing the Harry "Hap" Holmes Memorial Award with MacDonald for combining to have the lowest Goals against average in the AHL. His efforts did not go unnoticed by the Red Wings organization. On 1 July 2003, the first day of NHL free agency, Lamothe was re-signed to another year-long contract with the Red Wings, and again began the season assigned to the Griffins with MacDonald. However, as the season progressed, Dominik Hašek left the team due to injury while Curtis Joseph became injured as well, leaving the Red Wings to call up Lamothe to support Manny Legace. While he was never needed to relieve Legace, Lamothe started against his former club, the Edmonton Oilers, on February 23, 2004, skating to a 1–1 tie. The next morning, newspapers reported on Lamothe's story, where he spent 10 years almost exclusively in the minors before starting in net for one of hockey's most popular and successful teams. Lamothe started once more before the season was over, making 26 saves for a 3–2 victory over the St. Louis Blues.

=== European career ===
At the end of the season, economic woes befell the NHL and ultimately lead to the 2004–05 NHL lockout. Despite his success at the AHL level, Lamothe never caught on as an NHL goaltender before the lockout. However, Lamothe was generating interest from Russian Super League, which offered both a higher level of competition and a higher salary than the AHL could offer. On June 14, 2004, Lamothe moved overseas and signed with the Lokomotiv Yaroslavl. He appeared in 54 contests for them that season.

On July 22, 2005, Lamothe signed with the Severstal Cherepovets. He appeared in 83 contests with them over 2 seasons, in addition to 8 playoff games during that same timeframe. With Severstal Lamothe won LenVO cup in August 2005. On July 16, 2007, Lamothe was signed by SKA Saint Petersburg and played with them for the remainder of that season. Lamothe left after the season was over and signed with Barys Astana for the 2008–09 season.

Lamothe left Russia in the 2009–10 season, signing as a free agent to a one-year contract with Pelicans of the Finnish SM-liiga. Lamother played in 14 games with Pelicans before his season was abruptly ended in suffering a medial ligament tear in his knee.

On April 7, 2010, Lamothe signed a one-year contract with the Hamburg Freezers of the Deutsche Eishockey Liga for the 2010–11 season. With a lack of form, Lamothe was relegated to backup goaltender and seldom used after 15 games; he was released by the Freezers and returned to North America on November 23, 2010.

== Career statistics ==
=== Regular season and playoffs ===
| | | | Regular season | | | | | | | | | Playoffs |
| Season | Team | League | GP | W | L | T | MIN | GA | SO | GAA | SV% | GP | W | L | MIN | GA | SO | GAA | SV% |
|---|---|---|---|---|---|---|---|---|---|---|---|---|---|---|---|---|---|---|---|
| 1991–92 | Kingston Frontenacs | OHL | 42 | 10 | 25 | 2 | 2378 | 189 | 1 | 4.77 | .874 | — | — | — | — | — | — | — | — |
| 1992–93 | Kingston Frontenacs | OHL | 45 | 23 | 12 | 6 | 2489 | 162 | 1 | 3.91 | .889 | 15 | 8 | 5 | 733 | 46 | 1 | 3.77 | — |
| 1993–94 | Kingston Frontenacs | OHL | 48 | 23 | 20 | 5 | 2828 | 177 | 2 | 3.76 | .888 | 6 | 2 | 2 | 224 | 12 | 0 | 3.21 | — |
| 1994–95 | Fredericton Canadiens | AHL | 9 | 2 | 5 | 0 | 428 | 32 | 0 | 4.49 | .873 | — | — | — | — | — | — | — | — |
| 1994–95 | Wheeling Thunderbirds | ECHL | 13 | 9 | 2 | 1 | 737 | 38 | 0 | 3.09 | .892 | — | — | — | — | — | — | — | — |
| 1994–95 | Fredericton Canadiens | AHL | 23 | 5 | 9 | 3 | 1165 | 73 | 1 | 3.76 | .894 | 3 | 1 | 2 | 160 | 9 | 0 | 3.38 | .871 |
| 1996–97 | Indianapolis Ice | IHL | 38 | 20 | 14 | 4 | 2271 | 100 | 1 | 2.64 | .918 | 1 | 0 | 0 | 20 | 1 | 0 | 3.00 | .909 |
| 1997–98 | Indianapolis Ice | IHL | 31 | 18 | 10 | 2 | 1773 | 72 | 3 | 2.44 | .920 | 4 | 1 | 3 | 178 | 10 | 0 | 3.37 | .896 |
| 1998–99 | Indianapolis Ice | IHL | 32 | 9 | 16 | 6 | 1823 | 115 | 1 | 3.78 | .881 | 6 | 3 | 3 | 338 | 10 | 2 | 1.78 | .934 |
| 1998–99 | Detroit Vipers | IHL | — | — | — | — | — | — | — | — | — | 1 | 0 | 1 | 80 | 5 | 0 | 3.75 | .885 |
| 1999–00 | Cleveland Lumberjacks | IHL | 44 | 23 | 18 | 4 | 2455 | 112 | 2 | 2.74 | .915 | 4 | 2 | 2 | 325 | 12 | 0 | 2.21 | .924 |
| 1999–00 | Chicago Blackhawks | NHL | 2 | 1 | 1 | 0 | 116 | 10 | 0 | 5.17 | .800 | — | — | — | — | — | — | — | — |
| 2000–01 | Syracuse Crunch | AHL | 42 | 17 | 15 | 7 | 2323 | 112 | 2 | 2.89 | .921 | — | — | — | — | — | — | — | — |
| 2000–01 | Hamilton Bulldogs | AHL | 1 | 0 | 1 | 0 | 59 | 5 | 0 | 5.05 | .821 | — | — | — | — | — | — | — | — |
| 2001–02 | Hamilton Bulldogs | AHL | 45 | 22 | 19 | 2 | 2569 | 102 | 3 | 2.38 | .918 | 9 | 6 | 3 | 551 | 18 | 0 | 1.96 | .933 |
| 2002–03 | Grand Rapids Griffins | AHL | 60 | 33 | 18 | 8 | 3438 | 122 | 6 | 2.13 | .923 | 15 | 10 | 5 | 945 | 29 | 1 | 1.84 | .935 |
| 2003–04 | Grand Rapids Griffins | AHL | 43 | 21 | 16 | 5 | 2535 | 87 | 4 | 2.06 | .924 | 4 | 0 | 3 | 200 | 12 | 0 | 3.60 | .890 |
| 2003–04 | Detroit Red Wings | NHL | 2 | 1 | 0 | 1 | 125 | 3 | 0 | 1.44 | .948 | — | — | — | — | — | — | — | — |
| 2004–05 | Lokomotiv Yaroslavl | RSL | 55 | 30 | 14 | 11 | 3357 | 90 | 6 | 1.61 | .932 | 9 | 3 | 3 | 521 | 21 | 0 | 2.41 | .910 |
| 2005–06 | Severstal Cherepovets | RSL | 42 | — | — | — | 2379 | 79 | 4 | 1.99 | .920 | 4 | — | — | — | — | — | 2.26 | .910 |
| 2006–07 | Severstal Cherepovets | RSL | 41 | — | — | — | — | — | — | 2.21 | — | 4 | — | — | — | — | — | 1.64 | .931 |
| 2007–08 | SKA St. Petersburg | RSL | 41 | — | — | — | — | — | — | 2.10 | .912 | 9 | — | — | — | — | — | 2.02 | .902 |
| 2008–09 | Barys Astana | KHL | 15 | 5 | 6 | 1 | 687 | 47 | 0 | 4.10 | .881 | — | — | — | — | — | — | — | — |
| 2009–10 | Pelicans | SM-l | 14 | 4 | 7 | 1 | 766 | 43 | 0 | 3.37 | .905 | — | — | — | — | — | — | — | — |
| 2010–11 | Hamburg Freezers | DEL | 15 | 4 | 10 | 0 | 865 | 44 | 0 | 3.05 | .912 | — | — | — | — | — | — | — | — |
| NHL totals | | | 4 | 2 | 1 | 1 | 242 | 13 | 0 | 3.22 | .880 | — | — | — | — | — | — | — | — |

Awards and achievements
| Preceded by Martin Prusek | Aldege "Baz" Bastien Memorial Award; 2002–03 | Succeeded by Jason LaBarbera |
