= Josef Fojtík =

Czech ice hockey player

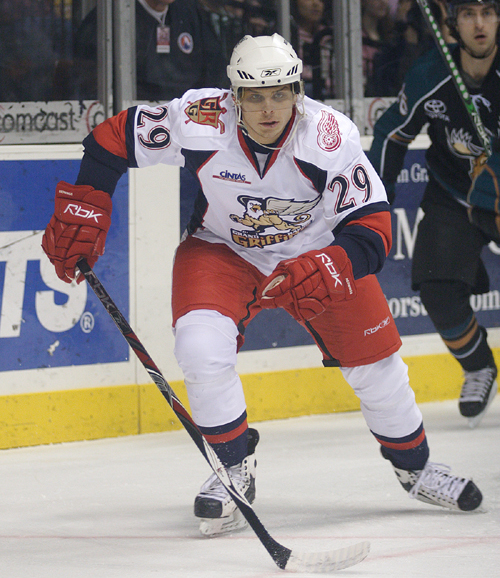
- Fojtik with the Grand Rapids Griffins during the 2007-08 season
- Born: September 11, 1984 (age 41) Kopřivnice, Czechoslovakia
- Height: 6 ft 0 in (183 cm)
- Weight: 205 lb (93 kg; 14 st 9 lb)
- Position: Left wing
- Shot: Left
- Played for: HC Zlín; HC Oceláři Třinec; Grand Rapids Griffins; HK Nitra; HK Dukla Trenčín; KS Cracovia
- Playing career: 2004–2019

Josef Fojtík (born September 11, 1984) is a Czech former professional ice hockey left winger.

Fojtík played four games in the Czech Extraliga, two for HC Zlín and two for HC Oceláři Třinec, during the 2005–06 season. He also played in the American Hockey League for the Grand Rapids Griffins, the Tipsport Liga for HK Nitra and HK Dukla Trenčín and in the Polska Hokej Liga for KS Cracovia.
